= Sean Alvarez =

American mixed martial artist

Sean Eric Alvarez
- Born: July 14, 1971 (age 55); New York City, New York, United States
- Other names: monster, master
- Height: 6 ft 0 in (1.83 m)
- Weight: 235 lb (107 kg; 16.8 st)
- Division: Heavyweight
- Style: Brazilian jiu-jitsu, Submission wrestling
- Stance: Orthodox
- Fighting out of: New York City, New York, United States
- Team: Renzo Gracie Jiu-Jitsu

Mixed martial arts record
- Total: 7
- Wins: 4
- By submission: 2
- By decision: 1
- Unknown: 1
- Losses: 3
- By knockout: 3

Other information
- Mixed martial arts record from Sherdog

Sean Alvarez
Medal record

Representing United States

Men's Submission grappling

ADCC Submission Wrestling World Championships
Silver medal – second place	1998 Abu Dhabi	+99 kg
Silver medal – second place	1999 Abu Dhabi	+99 kg
Silver medal – second place	2000 Abu Dhabi	Absolute

Sean Alvarez (born July 14, 1971) is an American retired mixed martial artist and grappler. He competed in the Heavyweight division. An accomplished grappler, Alvarez won gold medals at the Brazilian jiu-jitsu World Championships and the Pan American Championships as well three-silver medals at the ADCC Submission Wrestling World Championship. In MMA, he competed for the UFC, King of the Cage, and RINGS.

== Mixed martial arts career ==
Sean Alvarez started his MMA career in 1996, taking part in the "U - Japan" event. He defeated Japanese pro-wrestler Yoji Anjo via submission. He lost to Russian Sambo master Oleg Taktarov in 1997. At the same year he made his debut in RINGS and held wins over Willie Peters and Wataru Sakata. After two years break he took part in KOTC 9: Showtime and lost to Eric Pele. In 2003 he made his debut in UFC and lost to Wesley Correira at UFC 42.

== Grappling ==
Alvarez took part in 1998 ADCC World Championships at +99 weight category. After defeating Nader Ghaith, Brad Anderson, Simon Siasi he met Ricco Rodriguez in final match and loss by decision and won a silver medal. Next year he took part in 1999 ADCC World Championships. He defeated Garth Taylor, Ricco Rodriguez and Luis Roberto Duarte and loss to Mark Kerr and again won a silver medal. At 2000 ADCC World Championships Alvarez defeated Carlos Barreto, Ricco Rodriguez and Tito Ortiz and again loss to Mark Kerr in final match at absolute weight category and third time won a silver medal. In 2001 he won Luis Castello Branco and Marcio Cruz and loss to Jeff Monson at +99 weight category and loss to Mike Van Arsdale in absolute weight category. Alvarez then won the first ADCC North American trials in 2002, earning an invite to ADCC 2003 in the over 99 kg division. In 2003 Alvarez defeated Christoph Midoux and loss to Alex Paz.

== After retirement ==
After retirement Alvarez works as coach and organizes BJJ seminars.

== Mixed martial arts record ==
Professional record breakdown
7 matches	4 wins	3 losses
By knockout	1	3
By submission	1	0
By decision	1	0
Unknown	1	0

Res.	Record	Opponent	Method	Event	Date	Round	Time	Location	Notes
Loss	4–3	Wesley Correira	TKO (knees and punches)	UFC 42	April 25, 2003	2	1:46	Miami, Florida, United States	
Win	4–2	Mike Radnov	Submission (rear naked choke)	UCC 10: Battle for the Belts 2002	June 15, 2002	2	2:02	Hull, Quebec, Canada	Won the UCC Heavyweight Championship.
Loss	3–2	Eric Pele	KO	KOTC 9: Showtime	June 23, 2001	3	0:27	San Jacinto, California, United States	
Win	3–1	Wataru Sakata	Decision	RINGS: Final Capture	February 21, 1999	3	5:00	Japan	
Win	2–1	Willie Peeters	N/A	RINGS: Mega Battle Tournament 1997 Semifinal	December 23, 1997	1	9:40	Japan	
Loss	1–1	Oleg Taktarov	KO (punches)	Pentagon Combat: Pentagon Combat	September 27, 1997	1	0:52	Brazil	
Win	1–0	Yoji Anjo	TKO (submission to punches)	U-Japan ‘96 Superfighting Vol.1	November 17, 1996	1	34:26	Tokyo, Japan	

== Submission grappling record ==
? Matches, ? Wins (? Submissions), ? Losses (? Submissions), ? Draws
Result	Record	Opponent	Method	Event	Division	Date	Location
Loss	15–6	(Brazil) Alex Negao	Decision points	2003 ADCC World Championships	Over 99	May 17, 2003	Abu Dhabi, United Arab Emirates
Win	15–5	(France) Christoph Midoux	Decision points	2003 ADCC World Championships	Over 99	May 17, 2003	Abu Dhabi, United Arab Emirates
Loss	14–5	(Brazil) Mike Van Arsdale	Decision points	2001 ADCC World Championships	Absolute	April 11, 2001	Abu Dhabi, United Arab Emirates
Loss	14–4	(Brazil) Jeff Monson	Decision points	2001 ADCC World Championships	Over 99	April 11, 2001	Abu Dhabi, United Arab Emirates
Win	14–3	(Brazil) Marcio Cruz	Decision points	2001 ADCC World Championships	Over 99	April 11, 2001	Abu Dhabi, United Arab Emirates
Win	13–3	(Brazil) Luis Castello Branco	Decision points	2001 ADCC World Championships	Over 99	April 11, 2001	Abu Dhabi, United Arab Emirates
Loss	12–3	(United States) Mark Kerr	Decision points	2000 ADCC World Championships	Absolute	March 1, 2000	Abu Dhabi, United Arab Emirates
Win	12–2	(United States) Tito Ortiz	Decision points	2000 ADCC World Championships	Absolute	March 1, 2000	Abu Dhabi, United Arab Emirates
Win	11–2	(United States) Ricco Rodriguez	Decision points	2000 ADCC World Championships	Absolute	March 1, 2000	Abu Dhabi, United Arab Emirates
Win	10–2	(Brazil) Carlos Barreto	Decision points	2000 ADCC World Championships	Absolute	March 1, 2000	Abu Dhabi, United Arab Emirates
Loss	9–2	(United States) Mark Kerr	Decision points	1999 ADCC World Championships	Over 99	February 24, 1999	Abu Dhabi, United Arab Emirates
Win	9–1	(Brazil) Luis Roberto Duarte	Decision points	1999 ADCC World Championships	Over 99	February 24, 1999	Abu Dhabi, United Arab Emirates
Win	8–1	(United States) Ricco Rodriguez	Decision points	1999 ADCC World Championships	Over 99	February 24, 1999	Abu Dhabi, United Arab Emirates
Win	7–1	(United States) Garth Taylor	Decision points	1999 ADCC World Championships	Over 99	February 24, 1999	Abu Dhabi, United Arab Emirates
Loss	6–1	(United States) Ricco Rodriguez	Decision points	1998 ADCC World Championships	Over 99	March 20, 1998	Abu Dhabi, United Arab Emirates
Win	6–0	(United States) Simon Siasi	Decision points	1998 ADCC World Championships	Over 99	March 20, 1998	Abu Dhabi, United Arab Emirates
Win	5–0	(United States) Brad Anderson	Armbar	1998 ADCC World Championships	Over 99	March 20, 1998	Abu Dhabi, United Arab Emirates
Win	4–0	(United States) Nader Ghaith	Choke	1998 ADCC World Championships	Over 99	March 20, 1998	Abu Dhabi, United Arab Emirates
Win	3–0	(United States) Alex Paz	-	1997 IBJJF World Jiu-Jitsu Championship	Over 99	July 25, 1997	Rio de Janeiro, Brazil
Win	2–0	(Brazil) Alberto Lima Vieira	-	1996 Pan Jiu-Jitsu IBJJF Championship	Heavyweight	April 2, 1996	Rio de Janeiro, Brazil
Win	1–0	(United States) Garth Taylor	-	1996 Pan Jiu-Jitsu IBJJF Championship	Heavyweight	January 1, 1996	Los Angeles, California, United States
