= The Smashing Machine (disambiguation) =

The Smashing Machine is a nickname of American fighter Mark Kerr.

The Smashing Machine may also refer to:

- The Smashing Machine: The Life and Times of Extreme Fighter Mark Kerr, a 2002 film
- The Smashing Machine (2025 film)
