= Akira Shoji =

Japanese mixed martial arts fighter

- Born: January 31, 1974 (age 52); Uozu, Toyama, Japan
- Other names: Mr. Pride, The Last Japanese, The Japanese Jiu-Jitsu's Warrior Monk
- Nationality: Japanese
- Height: 5 ft 8 in (1.73 m)
- Weight: 205 lb (93 kg; 14.6 st)
- Division: Middleweight; Light Heavyweight; Heavyweight
- Style: MMA; Judo, Wajutsu
- Team: Wajyutsu Keisyukai Brightness
- Teacher: Yoshinori Nishi
- Rank: 4th Dan Black Belt in Judo; 3rd Dan Black Belt in Wajutsu
- Years active: 1996-2011

Mixed martial arts record
- Total: 37
- Wins: 14
- By knockout: 3
- By submission: 4
- By decision: 7
- Losses: 18
- By knockout: 9
- By submission: 3
- By decision: 6
- Draws: 5

Other information
- Mixed martial arts record from Sherdog

Akira Shoji (小路晃) (born January 31, 1974) is a retired Japanese mixed martial artist and professional wrestler. He is most known as being a regular in almost all the beginning Pride Fighting Championship Shoji was in Pride 1 to Pride 7, and was part of the first Pride open weight Grand Prix in 2000. Shoji was consistently a regular in Pride, and moved from Heavyweight to Light Heavyweight (Middleweight in Pride) due to his smaller stature.

Despite his losing record, Shoji was a constant favourite of the audience, and was nicknamed "Mr. Pride" for his popularity and adherence to the mixed martial arts promotion. He was known for his mic performance, die hard spirit, stellar submission escapes, razor sharp armbar and a fighting spirit demonstrated by his willingness to take on all comers. According to fight commentator Stephen Quadros and John Hyams, director of the documentary "The Smashing Machine", Shoji cleaned his house and prepared his will before every competition in case he is killed during the fight.

He also worked as a judge for the Dream organization.

== Mixed martial arts career ==
A national-ranked judoka since highschool, Shoji firstly dreamed with being a professional wrestler, but he developed an interest in mixed martial arts due to his schoolmate Kazunari Murakami, who convinced him to try on the Wajyutsu Keishukai gym. After graduating from Chukyo University, Shoji joined the dojo full-time and became a professional fighter. He represented WK at the Lumax Cup tournament, but he was eliminated at the first round.

=== Pride ===
Shoji had his worldwide debut taking on Renzo Gracie from the Gracie family at the first event of Pride in 1997. Though clearly outclassed, Shoji held his own and escaped from numerous submission attempts through the match, including an armbar and an omoplata which were almost fully locked, while regularly landing low kicks and some knees to the head. After thirty minutes, the match was ruled a draw due to the absence of judges. Nonetheless, Shoji got acclaimed by the crowd for his performance, which included grabbing the mic after the match and yelling "What do you say now, Gracies? Who said the Japanese were the weakest?" (Nani ga Gracie jā! Nani ga Nippon sai jaku jā?)

He returned at the next two events of Pride, submitting Juan Mott via rear naked choke and drawing with Takada Dojo understudy and fellow underdog Daijiro Matsui. However, his biggest victory came at Pride 4, where Shoji faced another unbeaten Brazilian jiu-jitsu exponent, Wallid Ismail. The Brazilian was aggressive and held Akira mounted for the first round, with Shoji reversing him every time. At the second round, however, the Japanese got the upper hand over a tired Ismail and landed multiple answered punches, which prompted the referee to stop the match for a win for Shoji.

Akira next faced Ukrainian Igor Vovchanchyn, who would become one of Pride's top strikers. Knowing the strengths of his adversary, Shoji played conservatively and avoided the KO for a decision loss. Shortly after, Shoji bounced back with another shocking victory in a match against Ultimate Fighting Championship champion and former King of Pancrase Guy Mezger. The fight was slow and strategic, with long battles on the clinch, with Mezger landing several strikes, but Shoji eventually found opportunities to take Mezger down and perform ground and pound. The judges gave the split decision to the Japanese, which was met with controversy in the United States.

At the Pride Grand Prix 2000 tournament, Shoji was first pitted against luta livre practitioner Ebenezer Fontes Braga, getting a unanimous decision victory. He advanced round, but he was then eliminated by the eventual winner Mark Coleman.

Shoji's last match in Pride would be in its very last event in 2007, fighting Gilbert Yvel and losing by TKO after a brief grappling exchange.

=== Retirement ===
While working as a fighting referee in Dream, Shoji considered a final retirement match. He got his will at DEEP 53 in a match against Kazuo Misaki, which he lost by TKO in the second round. Both Misaki and Shoji broke out in tears after the fight, overwhelmed by emotions, knowing it was Shoji's final match.

== Professional wrestling career ==
=== Hustle (2008–2009) ===
In 2008, Shoji began working in professional wrestling company Hustle, hosted by Dream Stage Entertainment along with Pride, and became a regular roster of the promotion. He debuted as a participant the Hustle Grand Prix tournament, being invited by famous idol Yuko Ogura and granted the ring name of "Ko♥Ri♥Ta♥N", but he was defeated by Osaka Pro Wrestling representative Zeus after getting hit with a frying pan.

Shoji then joined Generalissimo Takada's villainous faction Takada Monster Army, invited by Yuji Shimada, and he changed his name to "Private Shimada". In 2009, after losing a match to Wataru Sakata and Kurodaman, he was put on a trial by Shimada and threatened with expulsion if he lost a next singles match against Sakata, which eventually became a 3-way match with fellow Monster Army member Commander An Jo. Shoji have his best, but Shimada and An Jo crashed the match and made him lose. Kicked out of Takada's faction, Akira joined Sakata and got his revenge over Anjo, defeating him and Rey Ohara in a tag team match. remained as his ally until the end of the promotion.

=== Smash (2010–2011) ===
After Hustle's closure, Shoji joined Smash, a new promotion founded by Yoshihiro Tajiri and several former officials and wrestlers of Hustle. On January 30, 2011, Shoji lost to Yusuke Kodama in his final match before retiring from professional wrestling.

== Mixed martial arts record ==
Professional record breakdown
37 matches	14 wins	18 losses
By knockout	3	9
By submission	4	3
By decision	7	6
Draws	5	

Res.	Record	Opponent	Method	Event	Date	Round	Time	Location	Notes
Loss	14–18–5	Hideki Sekine	TKO (elbows)	Roots of Martial Arts Network 4	March 15, 2026	1	9:11	Tokyo, Japan	
Loss	14–17–5	Kazuo Misaki	TKO (punches)	DEEP 53 Impact	April 22, 2011	2	1:13	Tokyo, Japan	
Loss	14–16–5	Gilbert Yvel	TKO (punches)	Pride 34	April 8, 2007	1	3:04	Saitama, Japan	
Win	14–15–5	Carlos Toyota	Decision (majority)	clubDEEP Toyama: Barbarian Festival 5	November 19, 2006	2	5:00	Toyama, Japan	
Loss	13–15–5	Kyacey Uscola	KO (punches)	KOTC: All Stars	October 28, 2006	2	2:23	Reno, Nevada, United States	
Win	13–14–5	Todd Medina	Decision (unanimous)	KOTC: Rapid Fire	August 4, 2006	3	5:00	San Jacinto, California, United States	
Loss	12–14–5	Kazuo Misaki	Technical Submission (guillotine choke)	DEEP 23 Impact	February 5, 2006	1	2:32	Tokyo, Japan	
Loss	12–13–5	Mark Weir	KO (head kick)	Cage Rage 14	December 3, 2005	1	0:17	London, England	
Loss	12–12–5	Dean Lister	Submission (triangle choke)	Pride Bushido 6	April 3, 2005	1	3:13	Yokohama, Japan	
Loss	12–11–5	Paulo Filho	Decision (split)	Pride Bushido 4	July 19, 2004	2	5:00	Nagoya, Japan	
Win	12–10–5	Yukio Kawabe	TKO (punches)	Pride Bushido 3	May 23, 2004	1	0:18	Yokohama, Japan	
Loss	11–10–5	Murilo Rua	KO (flying knee)	Pride Shockwave 2003	December 31, 2003	1	2:24	Saitama, Japan	
Loss	11–9–5	Maurício Rua	KO (punches)	Pride Bushido 1	October 5, 2003	1	3:47	Saitama, Japan	
Win	11–8–5	Dustin Denes	Decision (unanimous)	Absolute FC 4	July 19, 2003	3	5:00	Fort Lauderdale, Florida, United States	
Win	10–8–5	Alex Stiebling	Decision (split)	Pride 25	March 16, 2003	3	5:00	Yokohama, Japan	
Loss	9–8–5	Paulo Filho	Submission (armbar)	Pride 22	September 29, 2002	1	2:48	Nagoya, Japan	
Win	9–7–5	David Roberts	Submission (armbar)	KOTC: Revolution	May 17, 2002	2	4:46	Reno, Nevada, United States	
Loss	8–7–5	Jeremy Horn	Decision (unanimous)	Pride 18	December 23, 2001	3	5:00	Fukuoka, Japan	
Loss	8–6–5	Semmy Schilt	TKO (knees and punches)	Pride 16	September 24, 2001	1	8:19	Osaka, Japan	
Loss	8–5–5	Dan Henderson	TKO (punches and knees)	Pride 14	May 27, 2001	3	3:18	Yokohama, Japan	
Loss	8–4–5	Ricardo Almeida	Decision (unanimous)	Pride 12	December 9, 2000	2	5:00	Saitama, Japan	
Win	8–3–5	Herman Renting	Submission (armbar)	Pride 10	October 31, 2000	1	3:48	Osaka, Japan	
Win	7–3–5	John Renken	Submission (armbar)	Pride 9	June 4, 2000	1	6:44	Nagoya, Japan	
Loss	6–3–5	Mark Coleman	Decision (unanimous)	Pride Grand Prix 2000: Finals	May 1, 2000	1	15:00	Tokyo, Japan	2000 Pride Heavyweight Grand Prix Quarterfinal.
Win	6–2–5	Ebenezer Fontes Braga	Decision (unanimous)	Pride Grand Prix 2000: Opening Round	January 30, 2000	1	15:00	Tokyo, Japan	2000 Pride Heavyweight Grand Prix Round of 16.
Draw	5–2–5	Ryushi Yanagisawa	Draw	Pancrase: 1999 Anniversary Show	September 18, 1999	1	15:00	Urayasu, Japan	
Win	5–2–4	Larry Parker	Decision (unanimous)	Pride 7	September 12, 1999	3	5:00	Yokohama, Japan	
Win	4–2–4	Guy Mezger	Decision (split)	Pride 6	July 4, 1999	3	5:00	Yokohama, Japan	
Loss	3–2–4	Igor Vovchanchyn	Decision (unanimous)	Pride 5	April 29, 1999	2	10:00	Nagoya, Japan	
Win	3–1–4	Wallid Ismail	TKO (punches)	Pride 4	October 11, 1998	2	1:26	Tokyo, Japan	
Draw	2–1–4	Adriano de Souza	Draw	Greatest Common Multiple: Vale Tudo	August 29, 1998	3	5:00	Nagasaki, Japan	
Draw	2–1–3	Daijiro Matsui	Draw	Pride 3	June 24, 1998	4	10:00	Tokyo, Japan	
Win	2–1–2	Juan Mott	Submission (rear naked choke)	Pride 2	March 15, 1998	1	3:47	Yokohama, Japan	
Draw	1–1–2	Renzo Gracie	Draw	Pride 1	October 11, 1997	3	10:00	Tokyo, Japan	
Loss	1–1–1	Kaichi Tsuji	Decision (unanimous)	Lumax Cup: Tournament of J '97 Heavyweight Tournament	July 27, 1997	2	3:00	Tokyo, Japan	
Win	1–0–1	Vidal Serradilla	TKO (submission to punches)	Japan Extreme Challenge Vale Tudo Open	May 28, 1997	1	2:16	Tokyo, Japan	
Draw	0–0–1	Manabu Ohara	Draw	KP X WK: Koppo vs. Keisyukai	November 30, 1996	1	20:00	Tokyo, Japan	Heavyweight debut.

== Submission grappling record ==
Result	Opponent	Method	Event	Date	Round	Time	Notes
Loss	(Brazil) Fabrício Werdum	Armbar	ADCC 2003 Absolute	2003	1		
Win	(Japan) Mitsuhiro Ishida	Points	ADCC 2003 Absolute	2003	1		
Loss	(United States) David Terrel	Points	ADCC 2003 +88 kg	2003	1		
Loss	(Brazil) Amaury Bitteti	Points	ADCC 1999 –88 kg	1999	1	10:00	
Win	(Japan) Masutatsu Yano	Decision	The CONTENDERS 1	1999	3	5:00	

== See also ==
- List of male mixed martial artists
