= List of people from Olympia, Washington =

The following is a list of famous Olympians, those people of note who have lived in or around Olympia, Washington, U.S.

== Actors, comedians ==
- Sam Miller (born c. 1982), comedian
- Eloise Mumford (born 1986), actress
- Michael Richards (born 1949), actor and former stand-up comedian; played Kramer on Seinfeld

== Academia ==
- Stephanie Coontz (born 1944), writer, academic and professor at Evergreen State College

== Film, television, animation ==
- Craig Bartlett (born 1956), cartoonist, animator; graduated from Evergreen State College
- Dan Erickson (born 1984), television screenwriter, playwright and producer
- Matt Groening (born 1954), animator, cartoonist, creator of The Simpsons and Life in Hell

== Military ==
- Robert Eugene Bush (1926–2005), youngest member of the U.S. Navy in World War II to receive the nation's highest military decoration for valor, Medal of Honor awardee
- Bruce P. Crandall (born 1933), Medal of Honor winner
- Myron H. Ranney (c. 1845–1910), Medal of Honor recipient in the American Civil War

== Musicians, music producers ==
- Carrie Brownstein (born 1974), guitarist, singer (Sleater-Kinney), actress
- Dylan Carlson (born 1968), guitarist and lead vocalist of Earth
- Gretchen Christopher, singer for The Fleetwoods
- Kurt Cobain (1967–1994), guitarist and singer, Nirvana
- Kimya Dawson (born 1972), singer-songwriter, part of The Moldy Peaches
- Beth Ditto (born 1981), vocalist (The Gossip)
- Kathleen Hanna (born 1968), musician, vocalist, Bikini Kill and Le Tigre
- Calvin Johnson (born 1962), founder of K Records, singer in Beat Happening and Dub Narcotic Sound System
- Conrad Keely (born 1972), vocalist, guitarist (…And You Will Know Us by the Trail of Dead)
- Macklemore (born 1983), hip hop musician; graduated from Evergreen State College
- Chiwoniso Maraire (1976–2013), American musician of Zimbabwean heritage
- Dumisani Maraire (1944–1999), Zimbabwean musician, singer-songwriter; taught at Evergreen State College
- Nellie McKay (born 1982), English Broadway actress, singer-songwriter
- Mirah (born 1974), singer-songwriter, released on K Records
- Slim Moon (born 1967), founder of Kill Rock Stars and 5 Rue Christine record labels
- Bruce Pavitt (born 1959), founder of Sub Pop Records; attended Evergreen State College
- Travis Shook (born 1969), jazz pianist
- Corin Tucker (born 1972), guitarist, singer for Sleater-Kinney
- Tobi Vail (born 1969), musician for Bikini Kill and The Frumpies
- Jared Warren, bassist, singer Big Business, The Melvins, formerly of Karp
- Kathi Wilcox (born 1969), musician (Bikini Kill, The Casual Dots)
- Allison Wolfe (born 1969), lead singer for Bratmobile and Partyline

== Politicians, political figures ==
- Daniel Bigelow (1824–1905), pioneer legislator, lawyer, and abolitionist
- Rachel Corrie (1979–2003), nonviolence activist, Palestinian solidarity activist
- Don Eldridge (1919–2007), politician, businessman
- Roland S. Morris (1874–1945), diplomat, U.S. ambassador to Japan
- Isaac N. Power (1852–1916), state representative

== Sports ==
- Geoff Jenkins (born 1974), MLB outfielder for Milwaukee Brewers
- Kasey Keller (born 1969), soccer goal keeper
- Brian Kendrick (born 1979), SmackDown! wrestler
- Peter Kennedy (born 1927), figure skater
- Travis Lee (born 1975), first baseman in Major League Baseball, Tampa Bay Devil Rays
- Justin Leone (born 1977), third baseman, San Diego Padres
- Amanda Moll (born 2005), pole vaulter
- Hana Moll (born 2005), pole vaulter
- Jeff Monson (born 1971), American-born Russian mixed martial arts fighter and anarchist
- Jared Sandberg (born 1978), third baseman, Tampa Bay Devil Rays
- Mike Sellers (born 1975), football player, Washington Redskins
- Jerramy Stevens (born 1979), football player, Tampa Bay Buccaneers
- Jonathan Stewart (born 1987), running back, Carolina Panthers

== Visual artists and designers ==
- Christopher Baldwin (born 1973), illustrator, cartoonist
- Lynda Barry (born 1956), cartoonist (Ernie Pook's Comeek), writer
- Benjamin Moore (1952–2021), studio glass artist, teacher
- Cappy Thompson (born 1952), painter, known for reverse glass painting

== Writers, poets ==
- Phoebe Judson (1831–1926), author, founder of Lynden, Washington
- Jim Lynch (born 1961), author of The Highest Tide
- Wendy C. Ortiz (born 1973), writer and poet, of Mexican heritage; graduated from Evergreen State College

== Others ==
- George Washington Bush (c. 1779–1863), early settler of Bush Prairie, trapper
- Adam Fletcher (born 1975), nonprofit director, Freechild Project; graduated from Evergreen State College
- Rebecca G. Howard (c. 1829–1881), pioneer black businesswoman
