= Jeff Monson =

American-born Russian mixed martial arts fighter (born 1971)

- Джефф Монсон
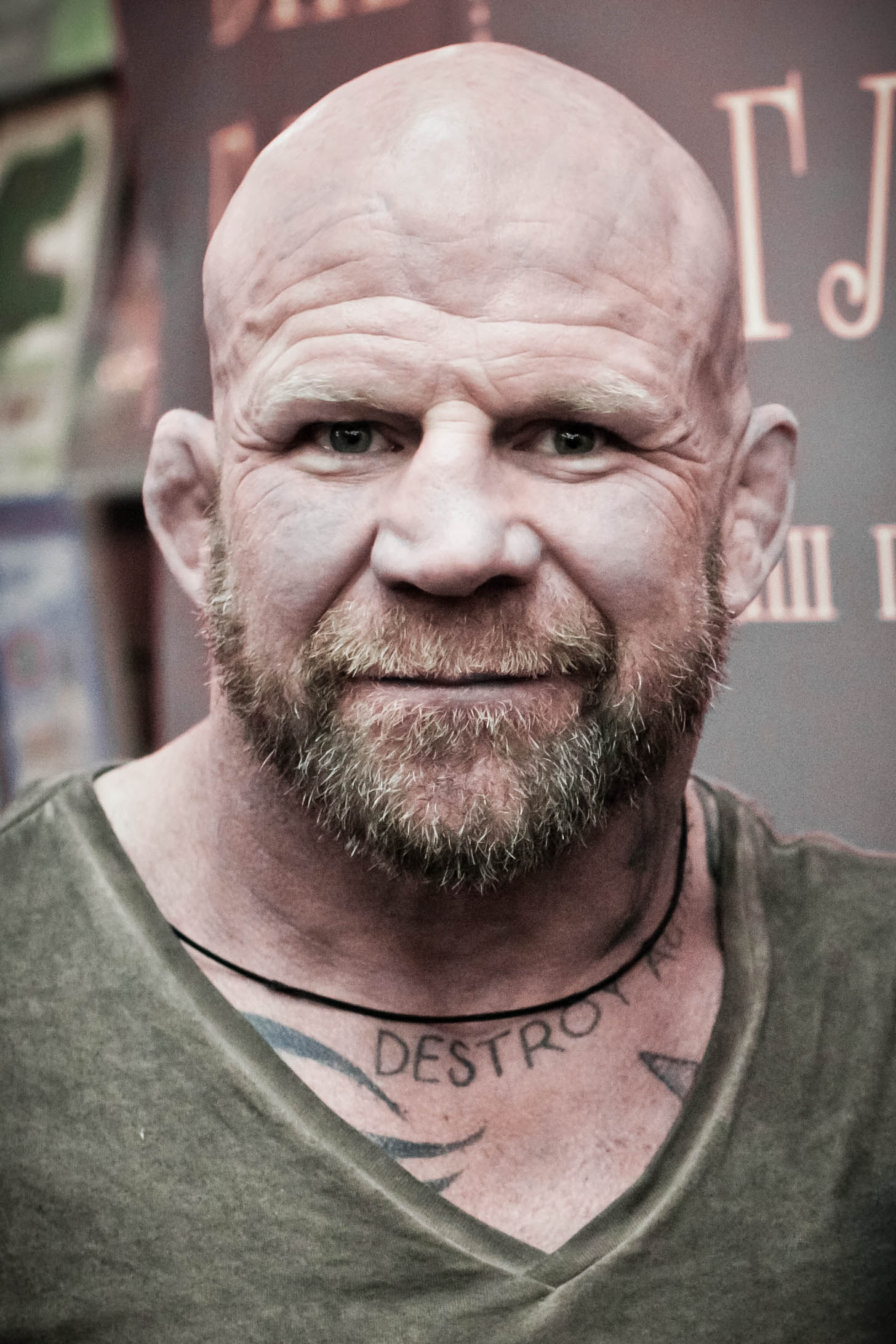

Member of the State Assembly of the Republic of Bashkortostan
- Incumbent
- Assumed office September 10, 2023

Member of the City Duma for Krasnogorsk
- In office September 9, 2018 – September 10, 2023

Special Representative for International Cooperation of the Communist Party of the Russian Federation's Sport Club
- Incumbent
- Assumed office June 2016

Personal details
- Born: Jeffrey William Monson; January 18, 1971 (age 55) Saint Paul, Minnesota, U.S.
- Party: Communist Party of the Russian Federation (since 2016)
- Other political affiliations: United Russia (as member of the State Assembly of the Republic of Bashkortostan)
- Martial arts career
- Other names: The Snowman
- Height: 5 ft 9 in (175 cm)
- Weight: 238 lb (108 kg; 17 st 0 lb)
- Division: Heavyweight (1997–2000, 2001–present); Light Heavyweight (2000)
- Reach: 71 in (180 cm)
- Style: Brazilian jiu-jitsu, Boxing
- Fighting out of: Coconut Creek, Florida, U.S.; Khimki, Moscow Oblast, Russia
- Team: American Top Team
- Rank: Black belt in Brazilian Jiu-Jitsu under Ricardo Libório
- Wrestling: NCAA Division I Wrestling
- Years active: 1997–2021

Professional boxing record
- Total: 4
- Wins: 2
- By knockout: 2
- Losses: 1
- Draws: 1

Mixed martial arts record
- Total: 89
- Wins: 61
- By knockout: 5
- By submission: 36
- By decision: 19
- By disqualification: 1
- Losses: 26
- By knockout: 10
- By submission: 4
- By decision: 12
- Draws: 2

Other information
- University: Oregon State University
- Boxing record from BoxRec
- Mixed martial arts record from Sherdog
- Last updated on: September 14, 2011

Jeff Monson
Medal record

Representing United States

Men's Submission grappling

ADCC Submission Wrestling World Championships
Bronze medal – third place	2009 Barcelona	+99 kg
Gold medal – first place	2005 Long Beach	+99 kg
Silver medal – second place	2001 Abu Dhabi	+99 kg
Silver medal – second place	2000 Abu Dhabi	-99 kg
Gold medal – first place	1999 Abu Dhabi	-99 kg

FILA Grappling World Championships
Gold medal – first place	2012 Kraków	+100 kg (No-Gi)
Gold medal – first place	2008 Lucerne	-125 kg (No-Gi)
Gold medal – first place	2007 Antalya	-125 kg (No-Gi)

Men's Brazilian Jiu-Jitsu

World No-Gi Jiu-Jitsu Championship
Gold medal – first place	2007 Carson	Open
Silver medal – second place	2007 Carson	+97.5 kg

Pan American Jiu-Jitsu Championships
Gold medal – first place	2001 Kissimmee	+100kg

Collegiate Wrestling

Representing the Oregon State Beavers

Pac-10 Championships
Gold medal – first place	1992	190 lb

Jeffrey William Monson (Russian: Дже́ффри Уи́льям Мо́нсон; born January 18, 1971) is an American-born Russian mixed martial artist, boxer, and submission grappler who competes primarily in the heavyweight division. A professional competitor since 1997, he has competed for the UFC, Strikeforce, DREAM, PRIDE, M-1 Global, Impact FC, World Victory Road, and Cage Warriors. In submission wrestling and Brazilian jiu-jitsu, Monson is a two-time ADCC World Champion and a no-gi Brazilian jiu-jitsu world champion.

Outside of fighting, Monson is known for his anarcho-communist political views. In 2018, Monson was elected to the city Duma of Krasnogorsk. He is additionally the host of the multi-platform political and social commentary program Monson TV on Russian state-funded RT. In February 2023, Monson began the process of renouncing his American citizenship.

== Early life ==
Monson was born in Saint Paul, Minnesota, where he also grew up for most of his childhood. He attended Timberline High School and continued on as a Division I wrestler at Oregon State University and at the University of Illinois and was a Pac-10 champion for Oregon State. He also competed at the senior level at USA Wrestling events for a number of years.

Monson received a bachelor's degree in psychology from the University of Illinois and a master's degree in psychology from the University of Minnesota Duluth, where he was the assistant coach of the wrestling team.

He worked as a mental health professional for five years, both in a crisis evaluation role for Cascade Mental Health in Lewis County, Washington, as well as a child and family counselor. However, having major success in Abu Dhabi Combat Club events and at other mixed martial arts (MMA) shows, he decided to leave the mental health profession to devote himself full-time to MMA.

== Martial arts background and nickname ==
Monson is a Brazilian jiu-jitsu black belt and a two-time Abu Dhabi Combat Club Submission Wrestling World Champion. He is an MMA fighter and has also had three professional boxing bouts. His boxing record is two wins and one draw.

Monson is considered to be one of the world's top submission grapplers. He is a multiple event winner at NAGA, Grapplers Quest and FILA, among other submission tournaments. He is nicknamed "The Snowman" for his performance at the 1999 Abu Dhabi Combat Club Submission Wrestling World Championship. The Brazilian fighters at the tournament gave him the nickname because he came in as an unknown, but beat four Brazilians in a row to win the 88–98 kilogram weight class. As he went along in the tournament and continued to beat his opponents, they said he was like a snowball (white, compact, rolling and getting bigger and stronger as the tournament went on).

== Mixed martial arts career ==
=== Ultimate Fighting Championship ===
After 14 straight MMA victories, Monson was signed by the UFC.

At UFC 57, Monson submitted Branden Lee Hinkle by north–south choke in the first round. At UFC 59, he fought Brazilian jiu-jitsu black belt Marcio Cruz (ADCC veteran and longtime rival). Monson won by decision after three rounds. At UFC 61, Monson fought another Brazilian jiu-jitsu black belt in Anthony Perosh, whom Monson defeated by TKO in the first round. This fight earned him a Knockout of the Night award.

On November 18, 2006, at UFC 65, Monson fought Tim Sylvia for the UFC Heavyweight Championship. He lost a five-round decision and would later ask to be released from his UFC contract in the hopes of facing then-PRIDE Heavyweight Champion Fedor Emelianenko at a BodogFIGHT event scheduled for March 2007. However, negotiations fell through and the match did not happen during that time.

=== PRIDE ===
In the main event of PRIDE 34, on April 8, 2007, Monson defeated Kazuyuki Fujita via rear-naked choke submission at 6:37 of the opening round. This was the final fight in the history of Pride Fighting Championships.

=== Post-PRIDE ===
His next fight was scheduled to be against Chris Guillen on August 17, 2007, for the Global Fighting Championships' Heavyweight Championship, but the event was canceled after four of the eight scheduled bouts were removed from the card. Monson lost against Pedro Rizzo at Art of War 3, which was held on September 1, 2007. During the bout, Monson displayed a much improved level of striking, and kept the fight standing virtually the entire time.

On September 7, 2007, Monson won two matches in the FILA World Championship in Turkey, defeating France's Zoro Piere and England's Tom Blackledge by submission. Monson was awarded the 275-pound gold medal when his final opponent Ramon Diaz suffered an injury and was forced to bow out.

Monson defeated former UFC Heavyweight Champion Ricco Rodriguez in the main event of the Mixed Fighting Alliance "There Will Be Blood" event on December 13, 2008. He avenged a loss to Rodriguez from almost seven years prior.

On March 21, 2009, Monson won a controversial decision against Roy Nelson on Roy Jones Jr.'s hybrid boxing/MMA card "March Badness." He then beat Sergej Maslobojev on a Cage Wars card on March 29, 2009. He immediately went to Japan and defeated top Russian Heavyweight Sergei Kharitonov on April 5, 2009, at Dream 8, giving him three wins in two weeks.

On September 12, 2009, at Bitetti Combat MMA 4, Monson had his seven-fight win streak snapped, losing in a rematch with Pedro Rizzo by unanimous decision.

At 5150 Combat League/Xtreme Fighting League: New Years Revolution, Monson defeated John Brown by split decision on January 16, 2010.

On March 13, 2010, Monson fought in France at 100% Fight II and defeated Francisco Nonato by submission (guillotine choke) in the first round. He lost to Travis Wiuff in a split decision at XKL Evolution 2 on April 24, 2010. On May 14, 2010, he lost in Abu Dhabi to Shamil Abdurahimov by majority decision at the Abu Dhabi Fighting Championship in the quarter-finals of the 2010 Openweight Grand Prix.

Monson defeated Bira Lima at Impact FC 1 in Australia on July 10, 2010, by unanimous decision.

Monson faced Jason Guida on August 21, 2010, at an event called "Fight Time 1". He defeated Jason Guida at 3:04 in the second round by a guillotine choke submission.

His next fight was scheduled to be against Neil Wain at "KnuckleUp: Kings of the North," but Neil Wain pulled out of the fight due to injuries. Stepping in to replace Wain was the very man who took him out of the fight, Dave Keeley. Monson defeated Keeley by submission (north–south choke) in the first round.

Monson defeated Sergey Shemetov at the inaugural Israel Fighting Championship event on November 9. After the fight, he said he wanted to drop down to the Light Heavyweight division for his next fight and his friend, Ricco Rodriguez, who later won his fight in the main event, said he wanted to fight Monson in the International Fighting Championships (IFC) at Light Heavyweight.

In 2011, Monson defeated Lee Mein on January 7 and Tony Lopez on April 1 in a five-round decision.

Monson's next fight was against Maro Perak where he won a three-round decision.

Monson said that after he fought in April and May, he hoped the UFC would want him back, but this time he would like to fight in the Light Heavyweight division.

Monson stepped in for injured Shane del Rosario to face prospect Daniel Cormier on the June 18 Strikeforce: Overeem vs. Werdum card in Dallas, Texas, and lost via fight via unanimous decision.

Monson defeated Paul Taylor in Birmingham, England at the Sprawl n Brawl promotion on October 9, 2011.

Monson fought Fedor Emelianenko at M-1 Global: Fedor vs. Monson on November 20, 2011, in Moscow, Russia and lost by unanimous decision.

Monson was unbeaten in his four fights after the loss against Fedor, and in June 2012 signed a four-fight deal with the Super Fight League in India. Monson was originally announced to fight at SFL 4 on September 29 against former UFC fighter Todd Duffee but after the event was pushed back twice the SFL decided to change the structure of their shows, with weekly events replacing monthly events. Duffee and SFL agreed on his departure in September and he is currently fighting in the UFC. Following this news, the fight was canceled.

From June 2013 to April 2014, Monson would go 1–6 in seven fights, defeating Denis Komkin, and losing to notable fighters such as Alexey Oleynik, Satoshi Ishii, and Mike Hayes. After a loss to up-and-comer Chaban Ka, Monson defeated Kevin Brooks via north–south choke at Fight Time 20 on August 29, 2014.

Monson faced Dmitry Titkov on September 5, 2014, at Fight Star: Saransk vs. Penza. He lost the fight by cut TKO, after a cut opened up on Monson.

Monson then faced Mikhail Shein at Fight Star: The Battle of the Sura 2. He won the fight via rear-naked choke in the second round.

Monson faced Ivan Shtyrkov on 6 May, the promoter and him decided to do an exhibition match due to Monson having an injury that would have forced him out of a legitimate MMA match. When the match started it quickly became clear that Shtyrkov was treating it as a real fight and shortly after dropping Monson with a straight right finished him with an armbar on his injured arm.

On 12 January 2021, Monson announced his official retirement from all forms of combat sports, including both MMA and Submission Grappling.

== Arnold Gracie competition incident ==
In 2004, when facing Márcio Cruz at the Arnold Gracie IBJJF competition, Monson allegedly attacked a referee and caused a brawl following the use of a "can opener" submission. The original attack was not caught on camera, but Monson is shown being restrained by several competition staff and coaches. As a result of this brawl the "can opener" was made illegal in IBJJF competitions. Both Monson and Pe de Pano were barred from competing at the next year's event.

== Politics ==
Monson is an anarcho-communist. He presently hosts a multi-platform (TV/social media) political and social commentary program on Russian state-funded RT, called Monson TV.

In 2015, Monson sought Russian citizenship, citing that he felt "Russian in spirit." He was granted Russian citizenship in 2018 by President Vladimir Putin.

In April 2016, Monson expressed his desire to join the Communist Party of the Russian Federation in a video appeal to the party and praised socialism as "the only way as a human species that we’re going to survive." Soon after, he was invited to meet Communist Party of the Russian Federation leader Gennady Zyuganov in his office in the State Duma, where they discussed the future of communism in Russia and globally. Monson later led a procession across Red Square into Lenin's Mausoleum together with Zyuganov dedicated to the anniversary of Vladimir Lenin's birth. He was appointed as a special representative for international cooperation by the Communist Party of the Russian Federation's Sport Club in June 2016.

Monson was the subject of a party political advertisement released in the run-up to the 2016 State Duma Elections.

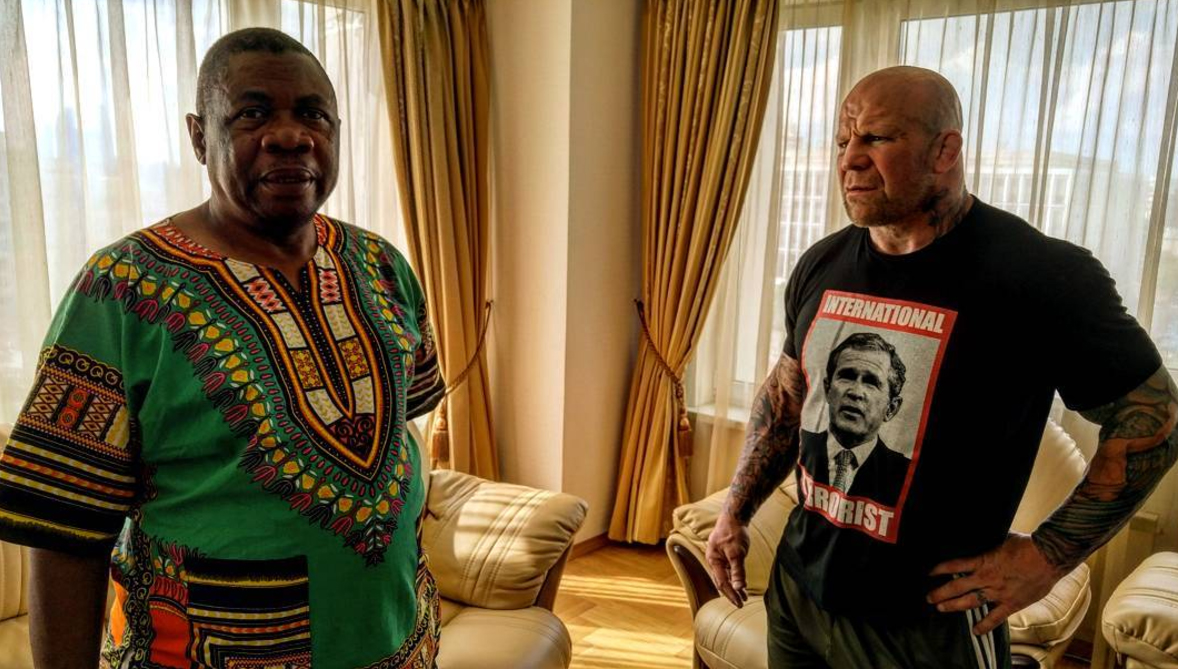
Jeff Monson and Ambassador of Zimbabwe to the Russian Federation Mike Nicholas Sango in Moscow.

In an interview, Monson stated his political views as follows: "I am an anarchist, someone who would like to do away with all class hierarchy in society and the institutions that promote this inequality."

Monson is a member of the Industrial Workers of the World.

On September 11, 2016, Monson announced on Twitter that he had become a citizen of the Luhansk People's Republic. He was made an honorary citizen of the Republic of Abkhazia in October 2016 for "supporting nations striving for self-determination".

On September 9, 2018, Monson was elected to the city duma (local city parliament) of Krasnogorsk, a city located near Moscow. Monson won the mandate as a candidate on the list of the ruling party United Russia, which nominated him without membership in the party. To be able to carry out the mandate, Monson had to give up his American citizenship in accordance with Russian law.

Monson has expressed explicit support for the Russian invasion of Ukraine in 2022. In March 2022, he criticized Arnold Schwarzenegger's appeal to the Russians (in which the latter accused the Russian government of aggression and disinformation of the population), recalling the non-compliance with the supposed agreement not to expand NATO to the East, as well as that the War in Donbas began back in 2014. In the same year, he released the movie "8 Years Before", dedicated to the citizens of the DPR and LPR: "I want to tell the world about it. In the US, no one knows what is really going on. They see Russia as an aggressor, not as a savior, which it really is. I want to tell the truth so that they can see the situation that is actually there. People in Donbass have been suffering for eight years, and no one knows about it. This is a crime!" About 500 local residents participated in the film.

In August 2023, Monson was noted in a video for the Russian college course "Fundamentals of Russian Statehood" which is mandatory for all college students in Russia as someone who embraced the "Russian world", a propaganda term for the culture and worldview of Russia. A lecture in the video claims that "Hospitality is one of the traits of the Russian national character. Foreigners are not simply delighted by our [i.e. Russian] culture — they adopt it as their own, becoming part of the Russian world." The same lecture also notes American actor Steven Seagal as another foreigner who has embraced the Russian world. The news site Meduza in an article about the course notes that both Monson and Seagal had become citizens of Russia and both have publicly supported Russia in its invasion of Ukraine. The "Fundamentals of Russian Statehood" course is intended at least in part to explain and justify the invasion.

In September 2023, Monson was elected to the 110-seat State Assembly (kurultai) of the Republic of Bashkortostan as a member of the ruling United Russia party following an election.

== Personal life ==
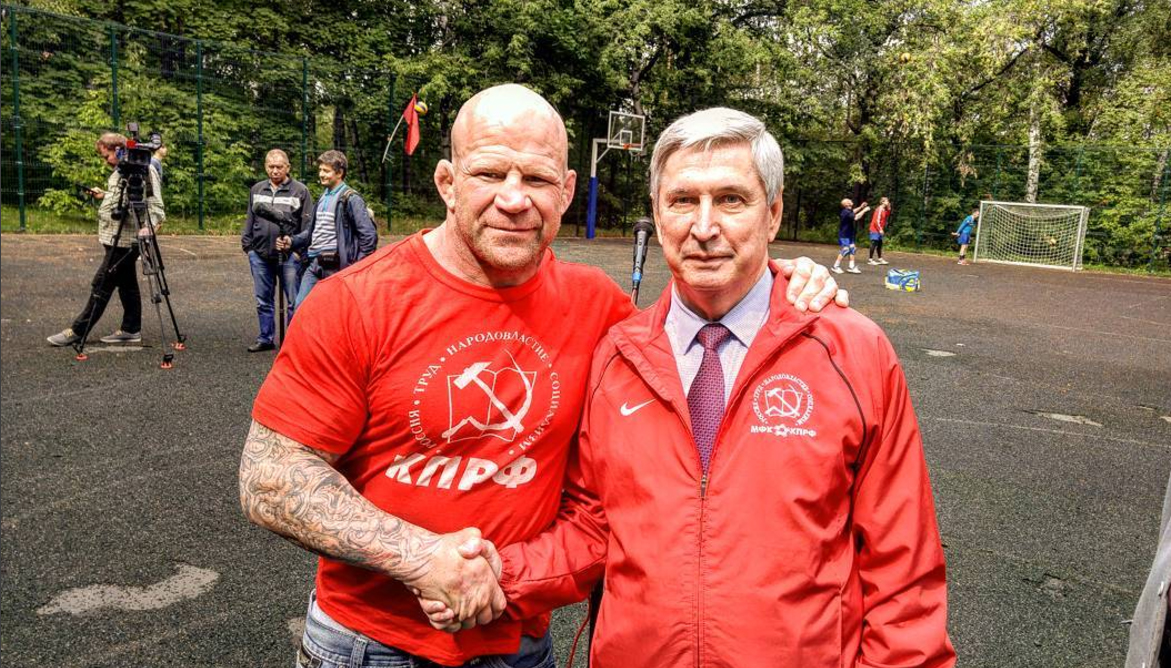
Jeff Monson and Deputy Head of the Communist Party of the Russian Federation Ivan Melnikov in Moscow.

Monson has two children from his first marriage. He has a daughter from his second marriage, and a fourth child with a Russian woman. Monson married his wife Ekaterina on October 7, 2024.

In late 2008, Monson spraypainted an anarchy symbol, peace symbol, "no war", and "no poverty" on the Washington State Capitol in photographs published in ESPN The Magazine. Charged with first-degree criminal mischief, Monson pled guilty in July 2009.

On February 16, 2023, Monson declared that he was in the process of renouncing his U.S. citizenship. "This spring, I'll only have my Russian passport," he said, "I do not agree with the American foreign policy, they keep meddling in the affairs of other countries, people are suffer[ing] because of them. Yes, I have children in the United States, but I love Russia and the Russians." On May 23, 2023, Monson officially renounced his American citizenship.

Monson converted to Islam on June 19, 2024, in Moscow.

== Championships and accomplishments ==
=== Mixed martial arts ===
- International Sport Karate Association
  - ISKA World Heavyweight Championship (One time; first)
- Sprawl 'N Brawl
  - SB Intercontinental Heavyweight Championship (One time)
- Strength and Honor Championship
  - SHC Heavyweight Championship (One time)
- Cage Warriors Fighting Championship
  - Cage Warriors Heavyweight Championship (One time)
  - Two Successful Title Defenses
- Ultimate Fighting Championship
  - Knockout of the Night (One time) vs. Anthony Perosh
  - UFC Encyclopedia Awards
    - Submission of the Night (One time) vs. Branden Lee Hinkle
- PRIDE Fighting Championships
  - Won the final PRIDE fight
- X Fighting Championships
  - XFC Heavyweight Championship (One time)
- SportFight
  - SportFight Heavyweight Championship (One time)

=== Submission grappling ===
- Abu Dhabi Combat Club
  - 2009 ADCC Submission Wrestling World Championships Bronze Medalist
  - 2005 ADCC Submission Wrestling World Championships Gold Medalist
  - 2001 ADCC Submission Wrestling World Championships Silver Medalist
  - 2000 ADCC Submission Wrestling World Championships Silver Medalist
  - 1999 ADCC Submission Wrestling World Championships Gold Medalist
- International Federation of Associated Wrestling Styles
  - 2012 FILA Grappling World Championships Senior No-Gi Gold Medalist
  - 2011 FILA Grand Prix Espoir No-Gi Absolute Silver Medalist
  - 2008 FILA Grappling World Championships Senior No-Gi Gold Medalist
  - 2007 FILA Grappling World Championships Senior No-Gi Gold Medalist
- International Brazilian Jiu-Jitsu Federation
  - 2007 IBJJF World Jiu-Jitsu Championships Black Belt No-Gi Absolute Gold Medalist
  - 2007 IBJJF World Jiu-Jitsu Championships Black Belt No-Gi Silver Medalist
  - 2001 Pan American Championships Blue Belt Gold Medalist
- USA Wrestling
  - FILA World Team Trials Senior No-Gi Winner (2007, 2008)
  - FILA World Team Trials Senior No-Gi Runner-up (2009)
- On the Mat
  - 2009 Submission Grappler of the year
  - 2004 Submission Grappler of the Year

=== Amateur wrestling ===
- USA Wrestling
  - Northwest Senior Greco-Roman Regional Championship (1998)
  - Northwest Senior Freestyle Regional Championship Runner-up (1998)
- National Collegiate Athletic Association
  - Pac-10 Conference Championship (1992)

== Mixed martial arts record ==
=== Professional ===
Professional record breakdown
89 matches	61 wins	26 losses
By knockout	5	10
By submission	36	4
By decision	19	12
By disqualification	1	0
Draws	2	

Res.	Record	Opponent	Method	Event	Date	Round	Time	Location	Notes
Draw	61–26–2	Nikolai Savilov	Draw	Arta MMA: Battle For Ryzan	March 25, 2017	2	5:00	Ryazan, Russia	
Win	61–26–1	Alex Kardo	Submission (north-south choke)	Industrials Battle in Belgorod	October 22, 2016	2	3:30	Belgorod, Russia	
Loss	60–26–1	Ivan Shtyrkov	Submission (armbar)	Titov Boxing Promotion: Monson vs. Shtyrkov	May 6, 2016	1	1:01	Yekaterinburg, Russia	
Win	60–25–1	Anton Lotkov	Submission (north-south choke)	Fight Stars 2	March 19, 2016	1	1:45	Balakovo, Russia	
Loss	59–25–1	Donald Njatah Nya	KO (punch)	Mix Fight Combat	December 25, 2015	1	0:50	Khimki, Russia	For the vacant MFC Heavyweight Championship.
Win	59–24–1	Konstantin Skrelya	Submission (north-south choke)	OFS: Octagon Fighting Sensation 6	November 20, 2015	1	2:13	Moscow, Russia	
Win	58–24–1	Nikolay Savilov	DQ (soccer kicks after bell)	Shield-Peresvet 3	September 26, 2015	1	5:00	Moscow, Russia	
Loss	57–24–1	Zamirbek Syrgabaev	Decision (unanimous)	JFC: Jashkuch Fighting Championship Fight Night	September 19, 2015	3	5:00	Bishkek, Kyrgyzstan	
Win	57–23–1	Denis Komkin	Decision (unanimous)	Fightspirit Championship 5	September 6, 2015	3	5:00	Kolpino, Russia	
Loss	56–23–1	Evgeny Erokhin	TKO (punches)	FEFoFP: Mayor's Cup	June 6, 2015	2	4:43	Khabarovsk, Russia	
Loss	56–22–1	Evgeny Egemberdiev	Decision (unanimous)	Alash Pride FC: Royal Plaza Vol. 5	April 30, 2015	3	5:00	Almaty, Kazakhstan	
Loss	56–21–1	D.J. Linderman	TKO (punches)	Fight Time 24: MMA Kings	April 3, 2015	5	1:42	Fort Lauderdale, Florida, United States	Lost the ISKA World Heavyweight Championship.
Win	56–20–1	Alexander Stolyarov	Submission (north-south choke)	OFS: Octagon Fighting Sensation 3	February 28, 2015	3	4:29	Yaroslavl, Russia	
Win	55–20–1	Vladimir Nepochatov	Submission (north-south choke)	Oplot Challenge 108	February 21, 2015	1	2:40	Moscow, Russia	Openweight bout.
Win	54–20–1	Ilya Shcheglov	Submission (north-south choke)	Eurasian Fighting Championship: Altay Great Battle	November 28, 2014	2	2:45	Barnaul, Russia	
Win	53–20–1	Evgeniy Bykov	Submission (rear-naked choke)	Fight Alliance Promotions: Gladiator Fighting 2	November 22, 2014	1	1:16	Troitsk, Moscow, Russia	
Win	52–20–1	Mikhail Shein	Submission (rear-naked choke)	Fight Stars: The Battle of the Sura 2	September 21, 2014	2	4:05	Penza, Russia	
Loss	51–20–1	Dmitry Titkov	Decision (unanimous)	Fight Stars: Saransk vs. Penza	September 5, 2014	3	5:00	Saransk, Russia	
Win	51–19–1	Kevin Brooks	Submission (north-south choke)	Fight Time 20	August 29, 2014	1	1:08	Fort Lauderdale, Florida, United States	
Loss	50–19–1	Chaban Ka	TKO (punches)	M-1 Challenge 47	April 4, 2014	1	1:31	Orenburg, Russia	
Loss	50–18–1	Shakhmaral Dzhepisov	KO (punches)	Diamond Fight	March 22, 2014	3	3:38	Almaty, Kazakhstan	
Loss	50–17–1	Mike Hayes	TKO (head kick and punches)	CWC 9: Cage Warrior Combat 9	November 2, 2013	3	1:21	Kent, Washington, United States	
Loss	50–16–1	Satoshi Ishii	Decision (majority)	M-1 Challenge 42	October 20, 2013	3	5:00	St. Petersburg, Russia	
Win	50–15–1	Denis Komkin	Decision (split)	Coliseum Fighting Championship: New History	September 16, 2013	3	5:00	St. Petersburg, Russia	
Loss	49–15–1	Alexey Oleynik	Submission (rear-naked choke)	Oplot Challenge 54	June 20, 2013	2	3:26	Kharkiv, Ukraine	
Loss	49–14–1	Magomed Malikov	TKO (doctor stoppage)	M-1 Challenge 40	June 8, 2013	2	2:58	Dzheyrakhsky District, Ingushetia, Russia	
Win	49–13–1	Drazen Forgac	TKO (knee injury)	Strength & Honor Championship 7	March 9, 2013	2	0:58	Geneva, Switzerland	Defended the SHC Heavyweight Championship.
Win	48–13–1	Dong Gook Kang	Decision (unanimous)	Road FC 10: Monson vs. Kang	November 24, 2012	3	5:00	Busan, South Korea	
Win	47–13–1	Alexander Emelianenko	Submission (north-south choke)	M-1 Challenge 35	November 15, 2012	2	3:17	St. Petersburg, Russia	
Win	46–13–1	Denis Komkin	Submission (north-south choke)	M-1 Global: Fedor vs. Rizzo	June 21, 2012	1	1:58	St. Petersburg, Russia	
Win	45–13–1	Jim York	Decision (unanimous)	Cage Fighting Championships 21	May 18, 2012	3	5:00	Sydney, Australia	
Draw	44–13–1	Chaban Ka	Draw	100% Fight 11: Explosion	May 11, 2012	3	5:00	Paris, France	
Win	44–13	Alexey Oleynik	Decision (split)	M-1 Challenge 31	March 16, 2012	3	5:00	St. Petersburg, Russia	
Loss	43–13	Fedor Emelianenko	Decision (unanimous)	M-1 Global: Fedor vs. Monson	November 20, 2011	3	5:00	Moscow, Russia	
Win	43–12	Paul Taylor	Submission (rear-naked choke)	Sprawl n Brawl 8: Return of the Cyborg	October 9, 2011	1	4:20	Edgbaston, Birmingham, England	Won the SNB Intercontinental Heavyweight Championship.
Loss	42–12	Daniel Cormier	Decision (unanimous)	Strikeforce: Overeem vs. Werdum	June 18, 2011	3	5:00	Dallas, Texas, United States	Strikeforce 2011 Heavyweight Grand Prix Reserve Bout.
Win	42–11	Maro Perak	Decision (unanimous)	SHC 4: Monson vs. Perak	April 30, 2011	3	5:00	Geneva, Switzerland	Won the SHC Heavyweight Championship.
Win	41–11	Tony Lopez	Decision (unanimous)	Fight Time 4: MMA Heavyweight Explosion	April 1, 2011	5	5:00	Fort Lauderdale, Florida, United States	Won the ISKA World Heavyweight Championship.
Win	40–11	Lee Mein	Submission (guillotine choke)	CFM 1: Monson vs. Mein	January 7, 2011	1	3:31	Winnipeg, Manitoba, Canada	
Win	39–11	Sergey Shemetov	Submission (americana)	Israel FC: Genesis	November 9, 2010	1	4:09	Tel Aviv, Israel	
Win	38–11	Travis Fulton	Submission (kimura)	Fight Time 2	October 23, 2010	1	4:40	Pompano Beach, Florida, United States	
Win	37–11	Dave Keeley	Submission (north-south choke)	KUMMA: Kings of the North	September 4, 2010	1	1:41	Lancashire, England	
Win	36–11	Jason Guida	Submission (rear-naked choke)	Fight Time 1	August 21, 2010	2	3:04	Pompano Beach, Florida, United States	
Win	35–11	Ubiratan Marinho Lima	Decision (unanimous)	Impact FC 1	July 10, 2010	3	5:00	Brisbane, Australia	
Loss	34–11	Shamil Abdurakhimov	Decision (majority)	ADFC: Battle of the Champions	May 14, 2010	3	5:00	Abu Dhabi, United Arab Emirates	
Loss	34–10	Travis Wiuff	Decision (split)	CFX / XKL: Mayhem in Minneapolis	April 24, 2010	3	5:00	Minneapolis, Minnesota, United States	
Win	34–9	Francisco Nonato	Submission (guillotine choke)	100% Fight: 100 Percent Fight 2	March 13, 2010	1	2:27	Paris, France	
Win	33–9	John Brown	Decision (split)	5150 Combat League / XFL: New Year's Revolution	January 16, 2010	3	5:00	Tulsa, Oklahoma, United States	
Loss	32–9	Pedro Rizzo	Decision (unanimous)	Bitetti Combat MMA 4	September 12, 2009	3	5:00	Rio de Janeiro, Brazil	
Win	32–8	Jimmy Ambriz	Submission (rear-naked choke)	TC 33: Bad Intentions	July 11, 2009	1	1:09	Mexico City, Mexico	
Win	31–8	Sergei Kharitonov	Submission (north-south choke)	Dream 8	April 5, 2009	1	1:42	Nagoya, Aichi, Japan	
Win	30–8	Sergej Maslobojev	Submission (north-south choke)	CW 11: Decade	March 29, 2009	2	2:30	Belfast, Northern Ireland	
Win	29–8	Roy Nelson	Decision (unanimous)	SRP: March Badness	March 21, 2009	3	5:00	Pensacola, Florida, United States	
Win	28–8	Ricco Rodriguez	Decision (unanimous)	MFA: There Will Be Blood	December 13, 2008	3	5:00	Miami, Florida, United States	
Win	27–8	Jimmy Ambriz	Submission (north-south choke)	Beatdown: 4 Bears Casino	October 11, 2008	1	1:50	New Town, North Dakota, United States	
Win	26–8	Mark Kerr	Submission (rear-naked choke)	Vengeance Fighting Championship 1	September 27, 2008	1	3:15	Concord, North Carolina, United States	
Loss	25–8	Josh Barnett	Decision (split)	World Victory Road Presents: Sengoku 2	May 18, 2008	3	5:00	Tokyo, Japan	
Win	25–7	Hakim Gouram	Decision (unanimous)	PFP: Ring of Fire	December 9, 2007	3	5:00	Quezon City, Philippines	
Loss	24–7	Pedro Rizzo	TKO (punches)	Art of War 3	September 1, 2007	3	2:40	Dallas, Texas, United States	For the UAFC Heavyweight Championship.
Win	24–6	Kazuyuki Fujita	Submission (rear-naked choke)	PRIDE 34	April 8, 2007	1	6:37	Saitama, Saitama, Japan	
Loss	23–6	Tim Sylvia	Decision (unanimous)	UFC 65	November 18, 2006	5	5:00	Sacramento, United States	For the UFC Heavyweight Championship.
Win	23–5	Anthony Perosh	TKO (punches)	UFC 61	July 8, 2006	1	2:43	Las Vegas, Nevada, United States	Knockout of the Night.
Win	22–5	Márcio Cruz	Decision (split)	UFC 59	April 15, 2006	3	5:00	Anaheim, California, United States	
Win	21–5	Branden Lee Hinkle	Technical Submission (north-south choke)	UFC 57	February 4, 2006	1	4:35	Las Vegas, Nevada, United States	
Win	20–5	Marc Emmanuel	Submission (rear-naked choke)	CWFC: Strike Force 4	November 26, 2005	1	0:58	Coventry, England	Defended the Cage Warriors Heavyweight Championship.
Win	19–5	Devin Cole	Decision (unanimous)	XFC: Dome of Destruction 3	October 15, 2005	3	5:00	Tacoma, Washington, United States	Won the XFC Heavyweight Championship.
Win	18–5	Jay White	Submission (rear-naked choke)	SF 12: Breakout	September 16, 2005	1	1:21	Portland, Oregon, United States	Won the SportFight Heavyweight Championship.
Win	17–5	Rich Wilson	Submission (armbar)	Extreme Wars: X-1	July 2, 2005	1	1:56	Honolulu, Hawaii, United States	
Win	16–5	Tengiz Tedoradze	Submission (rear-naked choke)	CWFC: Ultimate Force	April 30, 2005	1	1:59	Sheffield, England	Defended the Cage Warriors Heavyweight Championship.
Win	15–5	Jay White	TKO (injury)	Euphoria: USA vs. the World	February 26, 2005	1	4:07	Atlantic City, New Jersey, United States	
Win	14–5	Brian Stromberg	Submission (rear-naked choke)	SF 8: Justice	January 7, 2005	1	N/A	Gresham, Oregon, United States	
Win	13–5	Tengiz Tedoradze	Submission (rear-naked choke)	Cage Warriors 9: Xtreme Xmas	December 18, 2004	1	3:51	Sheffield, England	Won the Cage Warriors Heavyweight Championship.
Win	12–5	Pat Stano	TKO (knee to the body)	Euphoria: Road to the Titles	October 15, 2004	2	3:11	Atlantic City, New Jersey, United States	
Win	11–5	Carlos Clayton	Decision (unanimous)	AFC: Brazil 1	August 28, 2004	3	5:00	Rio de Janeiro, Brazil	
Win	10–5	Don Richards	Submission (north-south choke)	IHC 7: The Crucible	June 5, 2004	2	2:25	Hammond, Indiana, United States	
Win	9–5	Joe Nye	Submission (rear-naked choke)	Mass Destruction 12	August 16, 2003	1	3:02	Taunton, Massachusetts, United States	
Win	8–5	Mike Delaney	Submission (north-south choke)	Absolute Fighting Championships 4	July 19, 2003	1	4:27	Fort Lauderdale, Florida, United States	
Loss	7–5	Forrest Griffin	Decision (unanimous)	WEFC 1: Bring it On	June 29, 2002	4	4:20	Marietta, Georgia, United States	
Loss	7–4	Ricco Rodriguez	TKO (punches)	UFC 35	January 11, 2002	3	3:00	Uncasville, Connecticut, United States	
Win	7–3	Roman Roytberg	Submission (north-south choke)	AMC: Revenge of the Warriors	July 21, 2001	1	N/A	Rochester, Washington, United States	
Loss	6–3	Chuck Liddell	Decision (unanimous)	UFC 29	December 16, 2000	3	5:00	Tokyo, Japan	Light Heavyweight debut.
Win	6–2	Tim Lajcik	Decision (unanimous)	UFC 27	September 22, 2000	2	5:00	New Orleans, Louisiana, United States	
Win	5–2	Bob Gilstrap	Decision (unanimous)	AMC: Return of the Gladiators 1	July 29, 2000	3	5:00	Rochester, Washington, United States	
Loss	4–2	David Dodd	Submission (armbar)	Extreme Challenge 23	April 2, 1999	1	0:46	Indianapolis, Indiana, United States	
Win	4–1	Roger Neff	Decision	Ultimate Ring Challenge	March 1, 1999	3	5:00	Wenatchee, Washington, United States	
Loss	3–1	Tommy Sauer	Submission (rear-naked choke)	Extreme Challenge 20	August 22, 1998	1	3:47	Davenport, Iowa, United States	
Win	3–0	John Renfroe	TKO (submission to punches)	Ultimate Warrior Challenge	August 2, 1998	1	2:45	Vancouver, British Columbia, Canada	
Win	2–0	Cy Cross	Submission (rear-naked choke)	UFCF: Night of Champions	March 14, 1998	1	3:47	Lynnwood, Washington, United States	
Win	1–0	Luther Norberg	Decision (unanimous)	UFCF: Gladiators	November 21, 1997	1	N/A	No location reported	

=== Exhibition ===
Amateur record breakdown		
1 match	0 wins	1 loss
By decision	0	1

Res.	Record	Opponent	Method	Event	Date	Round	Time	Location	Notes
Loss	0–1	Viacheslav Datsik	Decision (unanimous)	Arta MMA: Battle For Ryzan	August 8, 2022	3	5:00	Moscow, Russia	

== Boxing record ==
4 fights	2 wins	1 loss
By knockout	2	0
By decision	0	1
Draws	1	

No.	Result	Record	Opponent	Method	Round, time	Date	Location	Notes
4	Loss	2–1–1	(Uzbekistan) Timer Nikulin	UD	4	Oct 26, 2021	Concert Hall Mir, Moscow, Russia	
3	Win	2–0–1	(United States) J.C. Hillard	TKO	2 (4), 2:11	Nov 20, 2004	Club Ovation, Boynton Beach, Florida, United States	
2	Win	1–0–1	(United States) Kenyatta Quitman	TKO	2 (4), 2:12	May 15, 2004	Club Ovation, Boynton Beach, Florida, United States	
1	Draw	0–0–1	(United States) Matt Ives	PTS	4	Apr 23, 2004	Club Med, Port St. Lucie, Florida, United States	

== Bare-knuckle boxing record ==
Professional record breakdown
1 match	0 wins	1 loss
By decision	0	1

Res.	Record	Opponent	Method	Event	Date	Round	Time	Location	Notes
Loss	0–1	(Russia) Alexander Emelianenko	Decision (unanimous)	Hardcore FC: Russia vs. USA	February 23, 2022	3	3:00	Moscow, Russia	

== Submission grappling record ==
16 Matches, 9 Wins (4 Submissions), 4 Losses (0 Submissions), 3 Draws
Result	Rec.	Opponent	Method	Event	Date	Location
Win	9–4–3	(Russia) Aleksey Molchakov	Submission (rear-naked choke)	Kingdom Professional Fight: Selection 4	July 18, 2020	St. Petersburg, Russia
Win	8–4–3	(United States) Warren Brooks	Submission (rear-naked choke)	Submission Underground 2	December 10, 2016	(United States) Portland, Oregon
Win	7–4–3	(United States) Shannon Ritch	Submission (kimura)	A-Fight MMA 4	October 9, 2016	Nevinnomyssk, Russia
Loss	6–4–3	(Russia) Levan Persaev	Decision (unanimous)	Octagon Fighting Sensation 9	October 6, 2016	(Georgia (country)) Sukhumi, Georgia
Draw	6–3–3	(Russia) Eduard Kuntudaev	Draw	Red City Fights 6	September 4, 2016	Yoshkar-Ola, Russia
Win	6–3–2	(Russia) Maxim Kiselev	Submission (north-south choke)	PRIDE Fighting Show 1	April 23, 2016	Nizhny Novgorod, Russia
Draw	5–3–2	(Russia) Aleksey Budimirov	Draw (unanimous)	Fight Stars: Battle on Sura 5	April 16, 2016	Penza, Russia
Draw	5–3–1	(Russia) Isa Umarov	Draw (unanimous)	Kunlun Fight 1	January 25, 2014	Pattaya, Thailand
Win	5–3	(Brazil) Gabriel Gonzaga	Decision	2005 ADCC Championships	May 28, 2005	(United States) Long Beach, California
Loss	4–3	(Brazil) Ryron Gracie	Decision (points)	Ultimate Submission Showdown 2003	October 11, 2003	(United States) Torrance, California
Loss	4–2	(South Africa) Mark Robinson	Decision	2001 ADCC World Championship	April 11, 2001	Abu Dhabi, United Arab Emirates
Loss	4–1	(Brazil) Ricardo Arona	Decision	2000 ADCC World Championship	March 1, 2000	Abu Dhabi, United Arab Emirates
Win	4–0	(Brazil) Saulo Ribeiro	Decision	1999 ADCC World Championship	February 24, 1999	Abu Dhabi, United Arab Emirates
Win	3–0	(Brazil) Rigan Machado	Decision (points)	1999 ADCC World Championship	February 24, 1999	Abu Dhabi, United Arab Emirates
Win	2–0	(Brazil) Roberto Traven	Decision (points)	1999 ADCC World Championship	February 24, 1999	Abu Dhabi, United Arab Emirates
Win	1–0	(Italy) Fabiano Capoani	Decision (points)	1999 ADCC World Championship	February 24, 1999	Abu Dhabi, United Arab Emirates

== See also ==
- List of Strikeforce alumni
- List of male mixed martial artists
- List of mixed martial artists with professional boxing records
- List of people from Olympia, Washington
- List of people who entered an Alford plea
