= Impact Fighting Championships =

Australian mixed martial arts (MMA) promotion based in Sydney

- Company type: Private
- Industry: MMA Promotion
- Founded: July 2010
- Founder: Andrew McManus, Thomas Huggins
- Defunct: July 2012
- Headquarters: Sydney, Australia
- Key people: Thomas Huggins - Creator and event organizer

Impact Fighting Championships (Impact FC) was an Australian mixed martial arts (MMA) promotion. The promotion held two of three planned events in July 2010 featuring veteran fighters of Ultimate Fighting Championship and Pride Fighting Championships. Impact FC was financed by Australian concert promoter Andrew McManus and created, organized, and produced by Brazilian promoter Tom Huggins, who helped promote Elite Xtreme Combat, Extreme Cagefighting, Bitetti Combat, and many other MMA events.

The promoters planned to put on three events in a single month in order gauge the interest of Australian fans to mixed martial arts. The first event, held on 10 July 2010 was expected to have a crowd over 1000 in the arena and be broadcast to a world-wide audience of 2.5 million. Following the second event controversy arose over payments to the fighters participating in the event. The fighters had left the arena following the show and traveled home without being paid for the event, going against many boxing and MMA commissions rules, though Thomas Huggins did directly contact the commission to notify them of Andrew McManus' failure to pay fighters as the licensed promoter, before any fighters left however the Commission said it had no power to force McManus to pay. Some fighters did receive partial payments in later weeks, but many were reporting they had gone unpaid. Huggins who had created the event had intended it to be a larger series of fights functioning as a collective of promoters licensing and sharing the Brand in many territories and had recruited local promoters around the world to work under this banner, however after McManus' failure to pay fighters Huggins and the other promoters felt the brand was effectively ruined and had to abandon it.

== List of events ==
=== Impact FC 1 ===
Impact FC 1: The Uprising - Brisbane
- Promotion: Impact Fighting Championships
- Date: July 10, 2010
- Venue: Brisbane Entertainment Centre
- City: Brisbane, Australia

Event chronology
Impact FC 1: The Uprising - Brisbane	Impact FC 2: The Uprising - Sydney

Impact FC 1: The Uprising - Brisbane was held on 10 July 2010 at the Brisbane Entertainment Centre in Brisbane, Australia.

==== Background ====
Big John McCarthy, former head referee for the UFC, was the referee for the Uprising series.

Dylan Andrews was rumored to fight Steven Kennedy, but it was never officially scheduled.

Luis Dutra Jr. was forced off the card because he separated his biceps. Ben Mortimer was Luis Dutra's replacement.

A hand injury to Felise Leniu and illness of Brad Morris left Bira Lima and Jeff Monson without opponents and they fought each other.

==== Results ====
Main card
Weight class				Method	Round	Time	Notes
Heavyweight	(United States) Josh Barnett	def.	(Brazil) Geronimo dos Santos	TKO (punches)	1	2:35
Heavyweight	(United States) Jeff Monson	def.	(Brazil) Bira Lima	Decision (unanimous)	3	5:00
Heavyweight	(Cameroon) Rameau Thierry Sokoudjou	def.	(Brazil) Joaquim Ferreira	TKO (punches)	1	1:20
Welterweight	(United States) Brian Ebersole	def.	(Canada) Carlos Newton	Decision (unanimous)	3	5:00
Lightweight	(Brazil) Thiago Meller	def.	(Australia) Jai Bradney	Submission (guillotine choke)	1	1:32
Heavyweight	(Australia) Fabio Fernandes	def.	(Australia) Api Hemara	Submission (rear-naked choke)	1	3:58
Catchweight (160 lb)	(Canada) Tom Waters	def.	(Australia) Jacob Mahony	TKO (punches)	2	1:38
Welterweight	(Armenia) Karo Parisyan	def.	(Australia) Ben Mortimer	Submission (rear-naked choke)	2	4:18

=== Impact FC 2 ===
Impact FC 2: The Uprising - Sydney
- Promotion: Impact Fighting Championships
- Date: July 18, 2010
- Venue: Sydney Entertainment Centre
- City: Sydney, Australia

Event chronology
Impact FC 1: The Uprising - Brisbane	Impact FC 2: The Uprising - Sydney

Impact FC 2 - The Uprising: Sydney was held on 18 July 2010 at the Sydney Entertainment Centre in Sydney, Australia.

==== Background ====
Big John McCarthy was the referee for the series.

Geronimo dos Santos vs. Josh Barnett and Brian Ebersole vs. Carlos Newton from Impact FC 1 - The Uprising: Brisbane were replayed during the broadcast of this card.

Bob Sapp was pulled from this event due to a dispute with Impact FC.

==== Fight Card ====
Main card
Weight class				Method	Round	Time	Notes
Heavyweight	(United States) Pedro Rizzo	def.	(United States) Ken Shamrock	TKO (leg kicks and punches)	1	3:33
Welterweight	(United Kingdom) Paul Daley	def.	(Brazil) Daniel Acacio	Submission (elbow)	3	1:15
Super Heavyweight	(Australia) Soa Palelei	def.	(Australia) Brad Morris	Submission (americana)	1	4:20
Middleweight	(Brazil) Paulo Filho	def.	(Canada) Denis Kang	Draw (split)	3	5:00	(Note: Fight scored 29–28, 27–30 and 29–29)
Middleweight	(Brazil) Murilo Rua	def.	(United States) Jeremy May	Submission (guillotine choke)	1	4:12
Middleweight	(United States) Jesse Taylor	def.	(Brazil) Murilo Bustamante	TKO (retirement)	2	2:10
Heavyweight	(New Zealand) Jim York	def.	(Australia) Peter Graham	Submission (rear-naked choke)	1	3:44
Light Heavyweight	(Brazil) Glover Teixeira	def.	(Australia) Marko Peselj	TKO (punches)	1	3:01
Lightweight	(Australia) Richie Vaculik	def.	(Australia) Glenn Taylor-Smith	Submission (rear-naked choke)	2	4:16
Welterweight	(Australia) Manuel Rodriguez	def.	(Australia) Shane Nix	Submission (north-south choke)	1	4:22
