= 1998 in Pride FC =

Mixed martial arts events

Information
- First date: March 15, 1998
- Last date: October 11, 1998

Events
- Total events: 3

Fights
- Total fights: 22

Chronology
1997 in Pride	1998 in Pride FC	1999 in Pride

The year 1998 was the 2nd year in the history of the Pride Fighting Championships, a mixed martial arts promotion based in Japan. 1998 had 3 events beginning with, Pride 2.

== Debut Pride FC fighters ==
The following fighters fought their first Pride FC fight in 1998:

- Alexander Otsuka
- Allan Goes
- Amir Rahnavardi
- Carlos Newton
- Daijiro Matsui
- Daiju Takase
- Emmanuel Yarborough
- George Randolph
- Hugo Duarte
- Igor Vovchanchyn
- Juan Mott
- Kazushi Sakuraba
- Kyle Sturgeon
- Marco Ruas
- Mark Kerr
- Naoki Sano
- Pedro Otavio
- Royler Gracie
- Sanae Kikuta
- Satoshi Honma
- Tasis Petridis
- Vernon White
- Wallid Ismail
- William van Roosmalen

== Events list ==
#	Event	Japanese name	Date held	Venue	City	Attendance
4	Pride 4	—N/a	October 11, 1998	Tokyo Dome	Tokyo, Japan	—N/a
3	Pride 3	—N/a	June 24, 1998	Nippon Budokan	Tokyo, Japan	—N/a
2	Pride 2	—N/a	March 15, 1998	Yokohama Arena	Yokohama, Japan	—N/a

== Pride 2 ==
Pride 2
- Promotion: Pride Fighting Championships
- Date: March 15, 1998
- Venue: Yokohama Arena
- City: Yokohama, Japan

Event chronology
Pride 1	Pride 2	Pride 3

Pride 2 was an event held on March 15, 1998, at The Yokohama Arena in Yokohama, Japan.

=== Results ===
Main card
Weight class				Method	Round	Time	Notes
	(United States) Mark Kerr	def.	(Croatia) Branko Cikatic	Disqualification	1	2:14	(Note: Cikatic was penalized for illegal elbows, grabbing the ropes and striking Kerr in the back of the head.)
	(Brazil) Marco Ruas	def.	(Trinidad and Tobago) Gary Goodridge	Submission (heel hook)	1	9:09
	(Australia) Tasis Petridis	def.	(United States) George Randolph	Decision	5	3:00	(Note: Kickboxing bout.)
	(Brazil) Renzo Gracie	def.	(Japan) Sanae Kikuta	Submission (guillotine choke)	6	0:43
	(Japan) Kazushi Sakuraba	def.	(United States) Vernon White	Submission (armbar)	3	6:53
	(Netherlands) William van Roosmalen	def.	(United States) Ralph White	KO	4	0:38	(Note: Kickboxing bout.)
	(Japan) Akira Shoji	def.	(Brazil) Juan Mott	Submission (rear-naked choke)	1	3:47
	(Brazil) Royler Gracie	def.	(Japan) Naoki Sano	Submission (armbar)	1	33:14

== Pride 3 ==
Pride 3
- Promotion: Pride Fighting Championships
- Date: June 24, 1998
- Venue: Nippon Budokan
- City: Tokyo, Japan

Event chronology
Pride 2	Pride 3	Pride 4

Pride 3 was an event held on June 24, 1998, at The Nippon Budokan in Tokyo, Japan.

=== Results ===
Main card
Weight class				Method	Round	Time	Notes
	(Japan) Nobuhiko Takada	def.	(United States) Kyle Sturgeon	Submission (heel hook)	1	2:18
	(United States) Mark Kerr	def.	(Brazil) Pedro Otavio	Technical Submission (kimura)	1	2:13
	(Trinidad and Tobago) Gary Goodridge	def.	(United States) Amir Rahnavardi	KO (punches)	1	7:22
	(Japan) Daiju Takase	def.	(United States) Emmanuel Yarborough	Submission (punches)	2	3:22
	(Japan) Kazushi Sakuraba	def.	(Canada) Carlos Newton	Submission (kneebar)	2	5:19
	(Japan) Daijiro Matsui	vs.	(Japan) Akira Shoji	Draw (time limit)	4	10:00

== Pride 4 ==
Pride 4
- Promotion: Pride Fighting Championships
- Date: October 11, 1998
- Venue: Tokyo Dome
- City: Tokyo

Event chronology
Pride 3	Pride 4	Pride 5

Pride 4 was an event held on October 11, 1998, at The Tokyo Dome in Tokyo, Japan.

=== Results ===
Main card
Weight class				Method	Round	Time	Notes
	(Brazil) Rickson Gracie	def.	(Japan) Nobuhiko Takada	Submission (armbar)	1	9:30
	(United States) Mark Kerr	def.	(Brazil) Hugo Duarte	TKO (retirement)	3	2:32
	(Japan) Alexander Otsuka	def.	(Brazil) Marco Ruas	TKO (corner stoppage)	2	10:00
	(Japan) Satoshi Honma	def.	(Japan) Naoki Sano	TKO (punches)	1	9:25
	(Japan) Kazushi Sakuraba	vs.	(Brazil) Allan Goes	Draw (time limit)	3	10:00
	(Japan) Daijiro Matsui	vs.	(Japan) Sanae Kikuta	Draw (time limit)	3	10:00
	(Japan) Akira Shoji	def.	(Brazil) Wallid Ismail	TKO (punches)	2	1:26
	(Ukraine) Igor Vovchanchyn	def.	(Trinidad and Tobago) Gary Goodridge	TKO (punches)	1	5:58

== See also ==
- Pride Fighting Championships
- List of Pride Fighting Championships champions
- List of Pride Fighting events
