= Mike Nicholas Sango =

Zimbabwean soldier, diplomat (born 1955)

Ambassador Mike Nicholas Sango
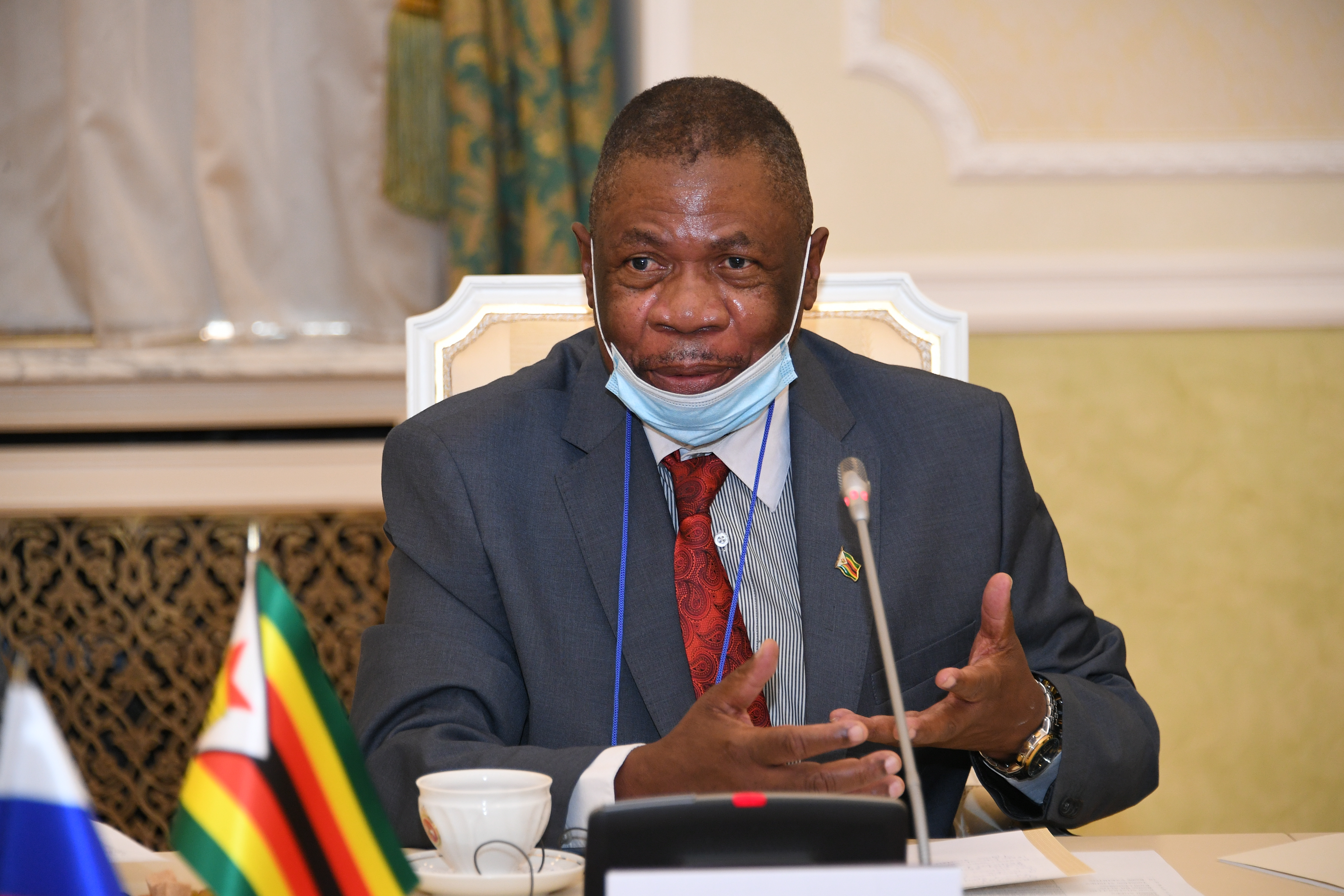
- Sango in April 2021

Ambassador of Zimbabwe to the Russian Federation
- Incumbent
- Assumed office July 2015
- President: Robert Mugabe
- Preceded by: Boniface Chidyausiku

Personal details
- Born: 5 December 1955 Zimbabwe
- Education: Zimbabwe Open University; University of Zimbabwe
- Occupation: Ambassador
- Profession: Diplomat

Military service
- Branch/service: ZANLA
- Years of service: 1975-1980
- Rank: Major general
- Battles/wars: Zimbabwe Liberation War

Mike Nicholas Sango (born 5 December 1955) is a Zimbabwean diplomat, Major general (rtd) and Zimbabwe's ambassador to Russia. He served in the Zimbabwe Liberation War as a member of the ZANLA from 1975 to 1980, which led to the country's attainment of independence and multiracial democracy.

Sango was attested in the army and held various high-level posts such as military adviser in Zimbabwe’s Permanent Mission to the United Nations, international instructor in the Southern African Development Community (SADC) on the laws of armed conflict and war, director of operations in the SADC Multinational Force in the Democratic Republic of Congo, brigade commander and other military staff appointments.

He was appointed Zimbabwe's ambassador to the Russian Federation in July 2015.

He holds a master's in International Relations from University of Zimbabwe and a master's in business administration from the Zimbabwe Open University.
