= Isaac N. Power =

American politician

Member of the Washington House of Representatives
- In office 1889–1891

Personal details
- Born: March 16, 1852 Olympia, Washington, United States
- Died: May 5, 1916 (aged 64) Coupeville, Washington, United States
- Party: Republican

Isaac Newton Power (March 16, 1852 – May 5, 1916) was an American politician in the state of Washington. He served in the Washington House of Representatives from 1889 to 1891.
