= Mark Kerr (fighter) =

American wrestler and mixed martial artist (born 1968)

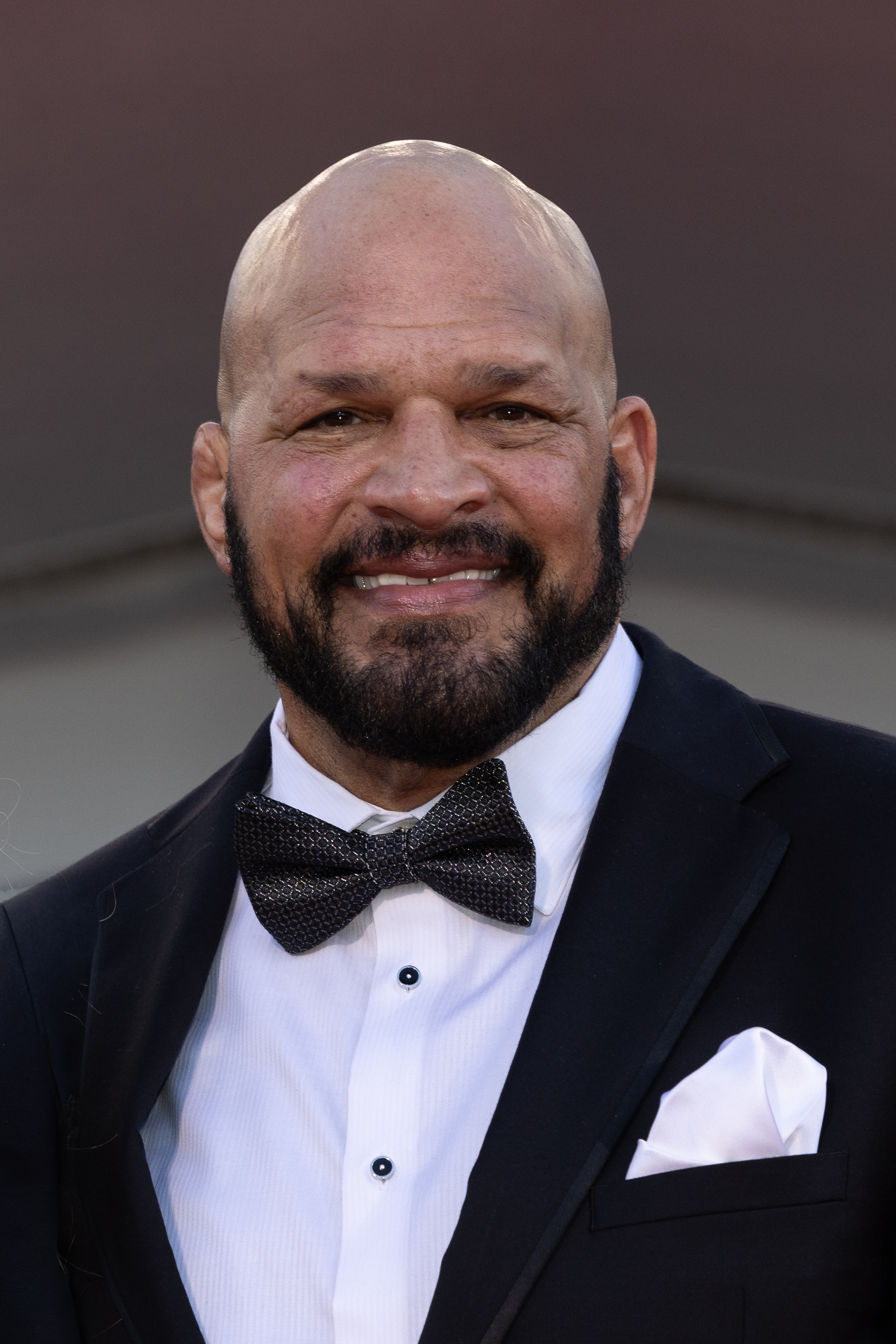
- Kerr in 2025
- Born: December 21, 1968 (age 57); Toledo, Ohio, U.S.
- Other name: The Smashing Machine
- Spouse(s): Dawn Staples (m. 2000; sep. 2006) Franci Alberding (m. 2023)
- Children: 1
- Martial arts career
- Height: 6 ft 3 in (191 cm)
- Weight: 255 lb (116 kg; 18 st 3 lb)
- Division: Heavyweight (265 lb)
- Style: Wrestling
- Team: Team Kerr
- Wrestling: NCAA Division I Champion in collegiate wrestling USA Wrestling national team for freestyle wrestling
- Years active: 1997–2009 (MMA)

Mixed martial arts record
- Total: 27
- Wins: 15
- By knockout: 4
- By submission: 7
- By decision: 2
- By disqualification: 2
- Losses: 11
- By knockout: 6
- By submission: 3
- By decision: 2
- No contests: 1

Other information
- Mixed martial arts record from Sherdog
- Last updated on: December 16, 2023

Mark Kerr (born December 21, 1968) is an American former wrestler and mixed martial artist. During his MMA career, he was a two-time UFC Heavyweight Tournament Champion, World Vale Tudo Championship tournament winner, and a PRIDE FC competitor. In collegiate wrestling, Kerr was an NCAA Division I champion. In freestyle wrestling, he won gold and silver medals at the World Cup and silver at the Pan American Games. In submission wrestling, Kerr is a four-time ADCC World Champion, winning his weightclass twice along with the absolute division and the Superfight Championship.

In 2002, Kerr was the subject of an HBO documentary titled The Smashing Machine, which detailed his MMA career fighting in Vale Tudo, the UFC and PRIDE. The Smashing Machine also focused on Kerr's struggle with substance abuse, his relationships with his then-girlfriend, various training partners, and friendship with Mark Coleman. A film of the same name by A24, starring Dwayne Johnson as Kerr, was released on October 3, 2025.

== Early life ==
Mark Kerr was born in Toledo, Ohio to Tom and Mary Kerr. His father was Irish, and his mother was Puerto Rican. From early childhood, he would dream of being in the World Wrestling Federation and would hold mock fights with his younger siblings in the back yard.

In 1983, Kerr began his wrestling career in Bettendorf, Iowa as a freshman at Bettendorf High School where he shared the wrestling room with future UFC champion Pat Miletich, a senior at the time. After his freshman year at Bettendorf, Kerr and his family moved to Toledo, Ohio where he became a high school state champion for Toledo Waite.

=== College and post-graduate career ===
At Syracuse University, Kerr was the Division I champion at 190 pounds and an All-American in 1992, defeating Randy Couture 12–4 in the final. He was also a three-time EIWA champion at 190 lb. (1989, 1991, 1992) and a runner-up in 1988, and won the Fletcher Award for scoring the most team points in 1991 and 1992. In 1992, Kerr came second at the World Cup, ahead of Kurt Angle. Kerr won the USA World Team Trials in 1993 and 1994, finishing 7th at the 1993 World Championships. In 1994, he won gold at the World Cup in Edmonton along with the USA Senior Freestyle Championship but did not medal at the World Championships. Kerr won silver in freestyle at the 1995 Pan American Games. After missing out on the 1996 Olympics, losing to Kurt Angle, Kerr decided to focus on MMA.

== Mixed martial arts career ==
While training as an amateur wrestler, Kerr became interested in mixed martial arts as a way to earn money. He, his long-time friend and training partner Mark Coleman and Tom Erikson were initially scouted by Richard Hamilton, who had managed Ultimate Fighting Championship fighter Don Frye until a falling out and was now offering a place in UFC 10 against him. However, nothing came from it, and Coleman ended up hunting down the chance. Eventually, Kerr and Hamilton arranged for the former to train with Coleman and fight at the Brazilian event World Vale Tudo Championship 3 in January 1997. His appearance was highly anticipated, as other wrestlers like Coleman or Erikson were already known in the MMA community, though there were doubts about Kerr's true skills. Kerr himself was doubtful about it, to the point Hamilton had to force him to fight under the threat the Brazilian crowd might riot and kill him if he did not show up.

=== World Vale Tudo Championship ===
Kerr made his debut in MMA at WVC 3 against UFC veteran Paul Varelans. The bout lasted two minutes, with Kerr slamming Varelans with a takedown, mounting him and landing punches and knee strikes for the stoppage. The same happened to his next opponent, Mestre Hulk, a capoeira police teacher who had become known for besting Brazilian jiu-jitsu fighter Amaury Bitteti. After losing two teeth to Kerr's ground and pound, Hulk crawled out of the ring, getting disqualified. Kerr then reached the finals, where he was pitted against jiu-jitsu fighter Fabio Gurgel. Again, the fight would bring echoes, this time those of the bout between Erikson and Gurgel's teammate Murilo Bustamante, which happened the same year.

Kerr went to the fight with a broken hand from the Hulk fight, but he had 50 pounds over Gurgel. He took Gurgel down, passed his guard with ease and bloodied him with multiple kinds of strikes. The situation prolonged itself by 19 minutes, with the Brazilian trying armlocks and triangle chokes from the bottom, but Kerr avoided them and kept landing punishment. The fight had no time limit, but at the 30 minute mark, seeing that Gurgel was unable to defend anymore, the judges stopped the fight and gave Kerr the win.

=== Ultimate Fighting Championship ===
Following his success in Brazil, Mark Kerr was invited to fight in the Ultimate Fighting Championship. Kerr had previously been told of the event by Coleman, who was himself a UFC tournament winner and champion by this point. Kerr's first bout in the UFC came at UFC 14 where he fought in the heavyweight tournament. His first fight was against krav maga representative Moti Horenstein, and Kerr defeated his opponent by technical knockout at 2:22 of the first round. With this win Kerr advanced to the finals of the tournament where he beat Dan Bobish with a submission (chin to the eye) at 1:38 of the first round; Kerr's win over Bobish earned him the UFC 14 Heavyweight tournament title.

Following his success at UFC 14, Kerr was invited to compete at the next UFC tournament — UFC 15. In this tournament, Kerr's first opponent was Greg Stott whom he defeated in 17 seconds from the opening of the fight, winning by way of knockout with a knee to his opponent's head. Advancing to the finals, Kerr fought Dwayne Cason and finished his opponent within the first minute of the opening round, winning the UFC 15 Heavyweight tournament. Kerr's winning of the UFC 15 tournament was his last fight for the Ultimate Fighting Championship. Following his win of UFC 15, Kerr decided to fight in Japan for the Pride Fighting Championships due to the UFC's promotional difficulties and Pride's larger paychecks.

=== Pride Fighting Championships ===
After considering an offer from Japanese promotion Shooto, Kerr signed up with Pride for a matchup against fellow UFC champion Royce Gracie at Pride 2 in 1998. The match, as per Gracie's demands, would have been without time limits or referee stoppages. However, Royce pulled out after the fight had been advertised. Kerr was then slated to fight Branco Cikatic. Kerr utilized the same ground-and-pound fighting style from his previous fights, taking his opponent onto the mat and then using strikes and submissions to try to finish the fight. Kerr was said to be an improved version of Mark Coleman because he was proficient in wrestling, submissions, and take downs, with good cardio and an ever-improving striking game under his tutelage with Bas Rutten. Around the time that Kerr entered PRIDE, some considered Kerr to be one of the top MMA Heavyweight fighters in the world.

Kerr won four bouts between Pride 2 and Pride 6. However, his status was soon questioned after his first bout with Igor Vovchanchyn at Pride 7, in which he was knocked out by illegal knee strikes. Even though the loss was overturned and changed to a "No Contest" ruling, Kerr admitted that the initial loss had been a difficult decision for him to face. Following his fight against Vovchanchyn, Kerr fought in the Pride Grand Prix 2000 Opening Round and won over Enson Inoue. His win against Inoue earned him a place at the Pride Grand Prix 2000 Finals, where he fought Kazuyuki Fujita and lost by decision. Kerr underwent stitching for a split chin immediately after the fight due to the hard knees to the face. At Pride 10 - Return of the Warriors Kerr defeated Igor Borisov by submission. Four months later, at Pride 12 - Cold Fury, he lost by decision in the rematch with Vovchanchyn. Kerr then lost to Heath Herring at Pride 15 via TKO. With his second loss in a row, Kerr decided to take time away from MMA.

In 2004, Kerr returned to PRIDE, fighting Yoshihisa Yamamoto at Pride 27. Just 40 seconds into the fight, Kerr attempted a double leg takedown, but accidentally spiked his head into the canvas, stunning him with Yamamoto quickly following up with punches to end the fight. With his third straight loss under the PRIDE FC banner, Kerr quit PRIDE.

Speaking of Kerr's time fighting in Japan, Mark Coleman said, "Every time a fight came around he was pretty scared. He was intimidated by the whole situation and that is probably what led to him using pain killers."

=== Later career ===
After his loss to Yoshihisa Yamamoto, Kerr was supposed to make his comeback against Wes Sims in the American Championship Fighting (ACF) on May 6, 2006, at the Denver Coliseum, but was not medically cleared to fight due to a hand injury.

On February 11, 2007, Kerr fought Mustafa Al Turk at Cage Rage 20: 'Born 2 Fight'. Kerr lost his footing after an attempted roundhouse kick and he was mounted, stunned with a series of blows and submitted within the first round. Kerr was supposed to fight Sean O'Haire on August 17 in the Global Fighting Championships first show at the Mohegan Sun Arena but was cancelled due to his high blood pressure and his license was suspended indefinitely.

Mark Kerr fought in the World Cage Fighting Organization (WCO) in November 2007, winning his bout against Steve Gavin by Americana after 1:39 of the first round.

In 2008, Kerr launched a comeback. In March, Mark beat Chuck Huus by Submission (Keylock/Americana) at CCCF – Battle on the Border. In April, he lost to Oleg Taktarov in one round by kneebar. Two months later, Kerr was choked out in the opening round by deaf fighter Tracy Willis at a C-3 Fights show in Concho, Oklahoma. On July 26, Ralph Kelly stopped Kerr in the first round at Xp3. On September 27, 2008, Kerr lost to fellow heavyweight Jeff Monson by rear-naked choke, in a battle of former ADCC champions.

On August 28, 2009, Kerr faced fellow wrestler Muhammed Lawal at an M-1 Global event. Kerr was taken down and subsequently pounded into unconsciousness in just 25 seconds, receiving several blows to the head after he was clearly unable to defend himself. This led the event's TV commentators to openly speculate that Kerr's fighting career was over. Guy Mezger, in the post-fight discussion, suggested that it was time for Kerr to "find another vocation". Kerr only won four of his 15 fights since 2000 and lost his last five fights.

=== Hall of Fame ===
During UFC 316's broadcast in June 2025, Kerr was announced as the next "pioneer wing" UFC Hall of Fame inductee during International Fight Week festivities in Las Vegas this June.

== Submission wrestling career ==
Kerr was successful at the ADCC Submission Wrestling World Championships. At the 1999 tournament, he won the +99 kg division by defeating Carlos Barreto, Josh Barnett, Chris Haseman, and Sean Alvarez. Kerr returned for the 2000 tournament, winning the +99 kg division again as well as the absolute division. In the +99 kg division, he defeated Josh Barnett again, Anthony Netzler, Rigan Machado, and Ricco Rodriguez. In the absolute division, he defeated Léo Vieira, Mike van Arsdale, Ricardo Almeida, and Sean Alvarez again. This earned him a Superfight Championship match in 2001 against Mário Sperry, which Kerr won. He lost the Superfight Championship to Ricardo Arona at the 2003 edition.

In recognition of his accomplishments, Kerr was one of the inaugural inductees into the ADCC Hall of Fame in 2022.

== In popular culture ==
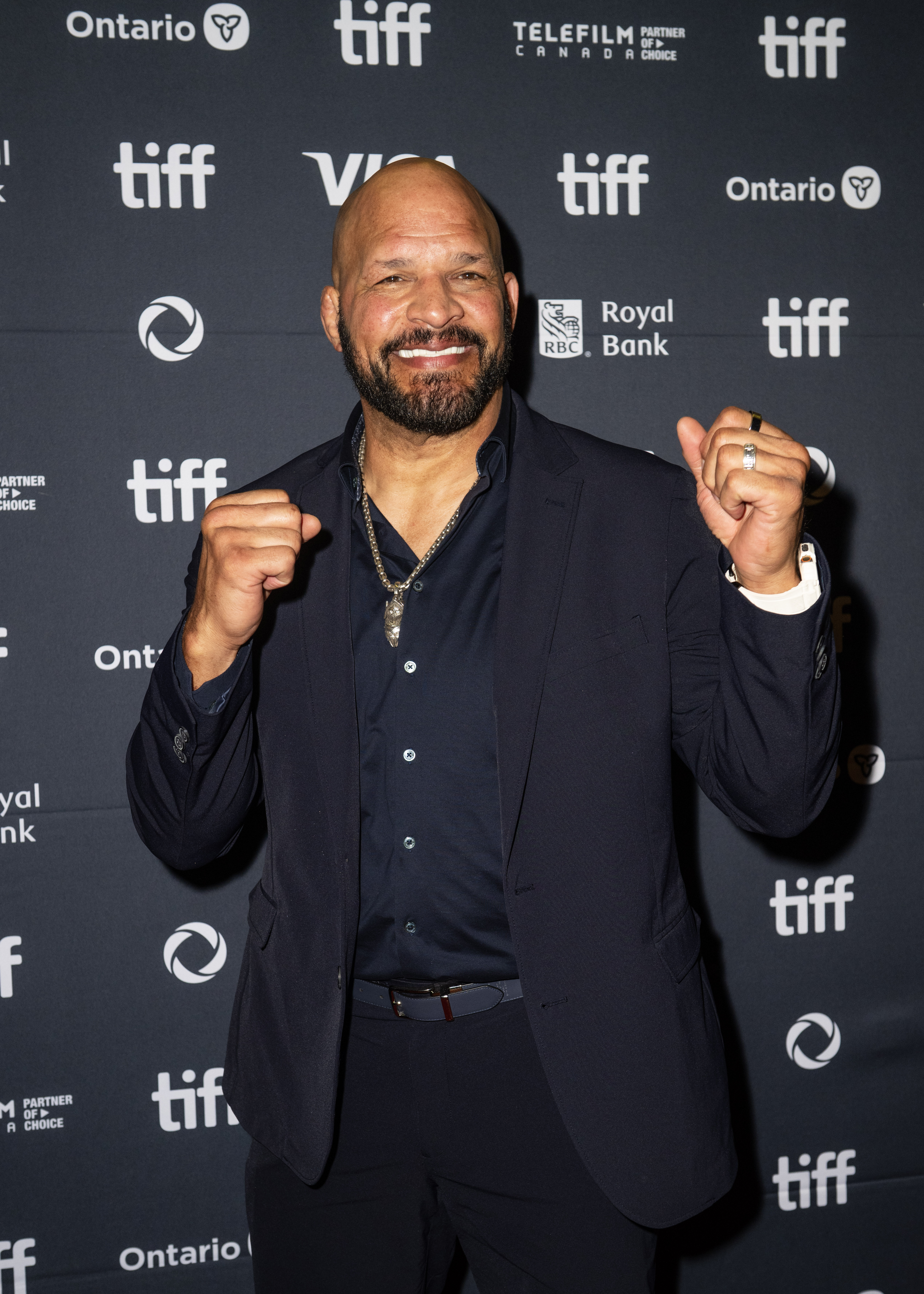
Kerr on the red carpet at the 2025 Toronto International Film Festival.

In 2002, HBO aired a documentary titled The Smashing Machine: The Life and Times of Extreme Fighter Mark Kerr, directed by John Hyams, which dealt with the life and career of Mark Kerr. The program chronicles Kerr's addiction to painkillers and the "no holds barred" aspect of early mixed martial arts competition. Kerr's then-girlfriend, Dawn Staples, and mixed-martial artists Bas Rutten, Kevin Randleman and Mark Coleman also appear in the film. Rutten states during the documentary that due to Kerr's ability to end fights quickly, the Pride tournament directors were removing all of Kerr's 'weapons' (notably head-butts and knees to the head of a grounded opponent) in an attempt to make the fights last longer for television and crowd satisfaction.

On December 13, 2023, it was announced that A24 would produce a biopic of Kerr titled The Smashing Machine, borrowing its title from the HBO documentary. Dwayne Johnson stars as Kerr, and Emily Blunt stars as Staples, with Benny Safdie as the director. The film was released on October 3, 2025.

== Personal life ==
Kerr married Dawn Staples in 2000. The couple have a son, born in 2005. Kerr and Staples separated in 2006, divorcing soon after. In 2023, Kerr married fitness consultant Franci Alberding. The couple run a fitness company called "Absoulute Wellness".

As of 2010, Kerr considered himself "99.9 percent retired" and was pursuing a degree with an eye on pharmaceutical sales. As of 2015, he was working at a Toyota dealership.

In June 2019 on a GoFundMe page, Kerr revealed that he had been battling peripheral neuropathy since 2016.

== Championships and accomplishments ==
=== Collegiate wrestling ===
- National Collegiate Athletic Association
  - NCAA Division I Champion - 1992 at 190 lb out of Syracuse University
- Eastern Intercollegiate Wrestling Association
  - Champion - 1989, 1991, 1992 at 190 lb out of Syracuse University
  - Runner-up - 1988 at 190 lb out of Syracuse University
  - Fletcher Award - 1991, 1992 for scoring the most team points

=== Freestyle wrestling ===
- United World Wrestling (FILA)
  - 1992 World Cup - Silver medalist at 100 kg
  - 1994 World Cup - Gold medalist at 100 kg
  - 1995 Pan American Games - Silver medalist at 100 kg
- USA Wrestling
  - 1993 World Team Trials - Winner at 100 kg
  - 1994 World Team Trials - Winner at 100 kg
  - 1994 Senior Freestyle Championship - Winner at 100 kg

=== Mixed martial arts ===
- Ultimate Fighting Championship (UFC)
  - UFC Hall of Fame (Pioneer wing, Class of 2025)
  - UFC 14 Heavyweight Tournament Champion
  - UFC 15 Heavyweight Tournament Champion
  - UFC Encyclopedia Awards
    - Knockout of the Night (Two times) vs. Moti Horenstein and Greg Stott
    - Submission of the Night (One time) vs. Dwayne Cason
- World Vale Tudo Championship
  - WVC 3 Heavyweight Tournament Champion

=== Submission wrestling ===
- ADCC World Championships
  - Champion - 1999 at +99 kg
  - Champion - 2000 at +99 kg
  - Champion - 2000 at Absolute
  - Superfight Champion, defeated Mario Sperry
  - ADCC Hall of Fame - 2022, inaugural class

== Mixed martial arts record ==
Professional record breakdown
27 matches	15 wins	11 losses
By knockout	4	6
By submission	7	3
By decision	2	2
By disqualification	2	0
No contests	1	

Res.	Record	Opponent	Method	Event	Date	Round	Time	Location	Notes
Loss	15–11 (1)	Muhammed Lawal	TKO (punches)	M-1 Global: Breakthrough	August 28, 2009	1	0:25	Kansas City, Kansas, United States	
Loss	15–10 (1)	Jeff Monson	Submission (rear-naked choke)	Vengeance FC	September 27, 2008	1	3:17	Concord, North Carolina, United States	
Loss	15–9 (1)	Ralph Kelly	TKO (punches)	Xp3: The Proving Ground	July 26, 2008	1	4:11	Houston, Texas, United States	
Loss	15–8 (1)	Tracy Willis	Submission (guillotine choke)	C-3 Fights: Contenders	June 7, 2008	1	0:45	Concho, Oklahoma, United States	
Loss	15–7 (1)	Oleg Taktarov	Submission (kneebar)	YAMMA Pit Fighting	April 11, 2008	1	1:55	Atlantic City, New Jersey, United States	
Win	15–6 (1)	Chuck Huus	Submission (keylock)	CCCF: Battle on the Border	March 29, 2008	1	2:41	Newkirk, Oklahoma, United States	
Win	14–6 (1)	Steve Gavin	Submission (armlock)	WCO: Kerr Vs. Gavin	November 7, 2007	1	1:39	Hollywood, California, United States	
Loss	13–6 (1)	Mostapha al-Turk	TKO (submission to punches)	Cage Rage 20	February 10, 2007	1	2:29	London, England	
Loss	13–5 (1)	Mike Whitehead	TKO (punches)	IFL: World Championship Semifinals	November 2, 2006	1	2:40	Portland, Oregon, United States	
Loss	13–4 (1)	Yoshihisa Yamamoto	KO (slam)	Pride 27	February 1, 2004	1	0:40	Osaka, Osaka, Japan	
Loss	13–3 (1)	Heath Herring	TKO (knees)	Pride 15	July 29, 2001	2	4:56	Saitama, Saitama, Japan	
Loss	13–2 (1)	Igor Vovchanchyn	Decision (unanimous)	Pride 12 - Cold Fury	December 23, 2000	3	5:00	Saitama, Saitama, Japan	
Win	13–1 (1)	Igor Borisov	Submission (can opener)	Pride 10 - Return of the Warriors	August 27, 2000	1	2:06	Tokorozawa, Saitama, Japan	
Loss	12–1 (1)	Kazuyuki Fujita	Decision (unanimous)	Pride Grand Prix 2000 Finals	May 1, 2000	1	15:00	Tokyo, Japan	
Win	12–0 (1)	Enson Inoue	Decision (majority)	Pride Grand Prix 2000 Opening Round	January 30, 2000	1	15:00	Tokyo, Japan	
NC	11–0 (1)	Igor Vovchanchyn	NC (illegal knees)	Pride 7	September 12, 1999	2	4:36	Yokohama, Kanagawa, Japan	Originally ruled a TKO loss; result later declared a no contest since knees to the head of a downed opponent were illegal at the time.
Win	11–0	Nobuhiko Takada	Submission (kimura)	Pride 6	July 4, 1999	1	3:04	Yokohama, Kanagawa, Japan	
Win	10–0	Hugo Duarte	TKO (retirement)	Pride 4	October 11, 1998	3	2:32	Tokyo, Japan	
Win	9–0	Pedro Otavio	Technical Submission (kimura)	Pride 3	June 24, 1998	1	2:13	Tokyo, Japan	
Win	8–0	Branko Cikatic	DQ (rope grabbing)	Pride 2	March 15, 1998	1	2:14	Yokohama, Kanagawa, Japan	
Win	7–0	Dwayne Cason	Submission (rear-naked choke)	UFC 15	October 17, 1997	1	0:53	Bay St. Louis, Mississippi, United States	Won the UFC 15 Heavyweight Tournament.
Win	6–0	Greg Stott	KO (knee)	UFC 15	October 17, 1997	1	0:17	Bay St. Louis, Mississippi, United States	UFC 15 Heavyweight Tournament Semifinal.
Win	5–0	Dan Bobish	Submission (chin to the eye)	UFC 14	July 27, 1997	1	1:38	Birmingham, Alabama, United States	Won the UFC 14 Heavyweight Tournament.
Win	4–0	Moti Horenstein	TKO (punches)	UFC 14	July 27, 1997	1	2:22	Birmingham, Alabama, United States	UFC 14 Heavyweight Tournament Semifinal.
Win	3–0	Fabio Gurgel	Decision (unanimous)	World Vale Tudo Championship 3	January 19, 1997	1	30:00	São Paulo, Brazil	Won the WVC 3 Heavyweight Tournament.
Win	2–0	Mestre Hulk	DQ (crawling out of the ring)	World Vale Tudo Championship 3	January 19, 1997	1	2:21	São Paulo, Brazil	WVC 3 Heavyweight Tournament Semifinal.
Win	1–0	Paul Varelans	TKO (knees and punches)	World Vale Tudo Championship 3	January 19, 1997	1	2:06	São Paulo, Brazil	WVC 3 Heavyweight Tournament Quarterfinal.

== Submission wrestling record ==
Result	Opponent	Event	Division	Date	Location	Notes	Ref
Loss	Ricardo Arona	ADCC 2003	Superfight	May 17, 2003	São Paulo, Brazil	Lost the Superfight Championship	
Win	Mário Sperry	ADCC 2001	Superfight	April 11, 2001	Abu Dhabi, United Arab Emirates	Won the Superfight Championship	
Win	Sean Alvarez	ADCC 2000	Absolute	March 1, 2000	Abu Dhabi, United Arab Emirates	Final, won absolute division	
Win	Ricardo Almeida	ADCC 2000	Absolute	March 1, 2000	Abu Dhabi, United Arab Emirates	Semi-final	
Win	Mike van Arsdale	ADCC 2000	Absolute	March 1, 2000	Abu Dhabi, United Arab Emirates	Quarter-final	
Win	Léo Vieira	ADCC 2000	Absolute	March 1, 2000	Abu Dhabi, United Arab Emirates	First round	
Win	Ricco Rodriguez	ADCC 2000	+99 kg	March 1, 2000	Abu Dhabi, United Arab Emirates	Final, won +99 kg division	
Win	Rigan Machado	ADCC 2000	+99 kg	March 1, 2000	Abu Dhabi, United Arab Emirates	Semi-final	
Win	Anthony Netzler	ADCC 2000	+99 kg	March 1, 2000	Abu Dhabi, United Arab Emirates	Quarter-final	
Win	Josh Barnett	ADCC 2000	+99 kg	March 1, 2000	Abu Dhabi, United Arab Emirates	First round	
Win	Sean Alvarez	ADCC 1999	+99 kg	February 24, 1999	Abu Dhabi, United Arab Emirates	Final, won +99 kg division	
Win	Chris Haseman	ADCC 1999	+99 kg	February 24, 1999	Abu Dhabi, United Arab Emirates	Semi-final	
Win	Josh Barnett	ADCC 1999	+99 kg	February 24, 1999	Abu Dhabi, United Arab Emirates	Quarter-final	
Win	Carlos Barreto	ADCC 1999	+99 kg	February 24, 1999	Abu Dhabi, United Arab Emirates	First round	

Preceded by Randy Couture	UFC 14 Heavyweight tournament winner UFC 15 Heavyweight tournament winner March 13, 1997; October 17, 1997	Succeeded by Kazushi Sakuraba
