= Ricco Rodriguez =

American mixed martial arts fighter

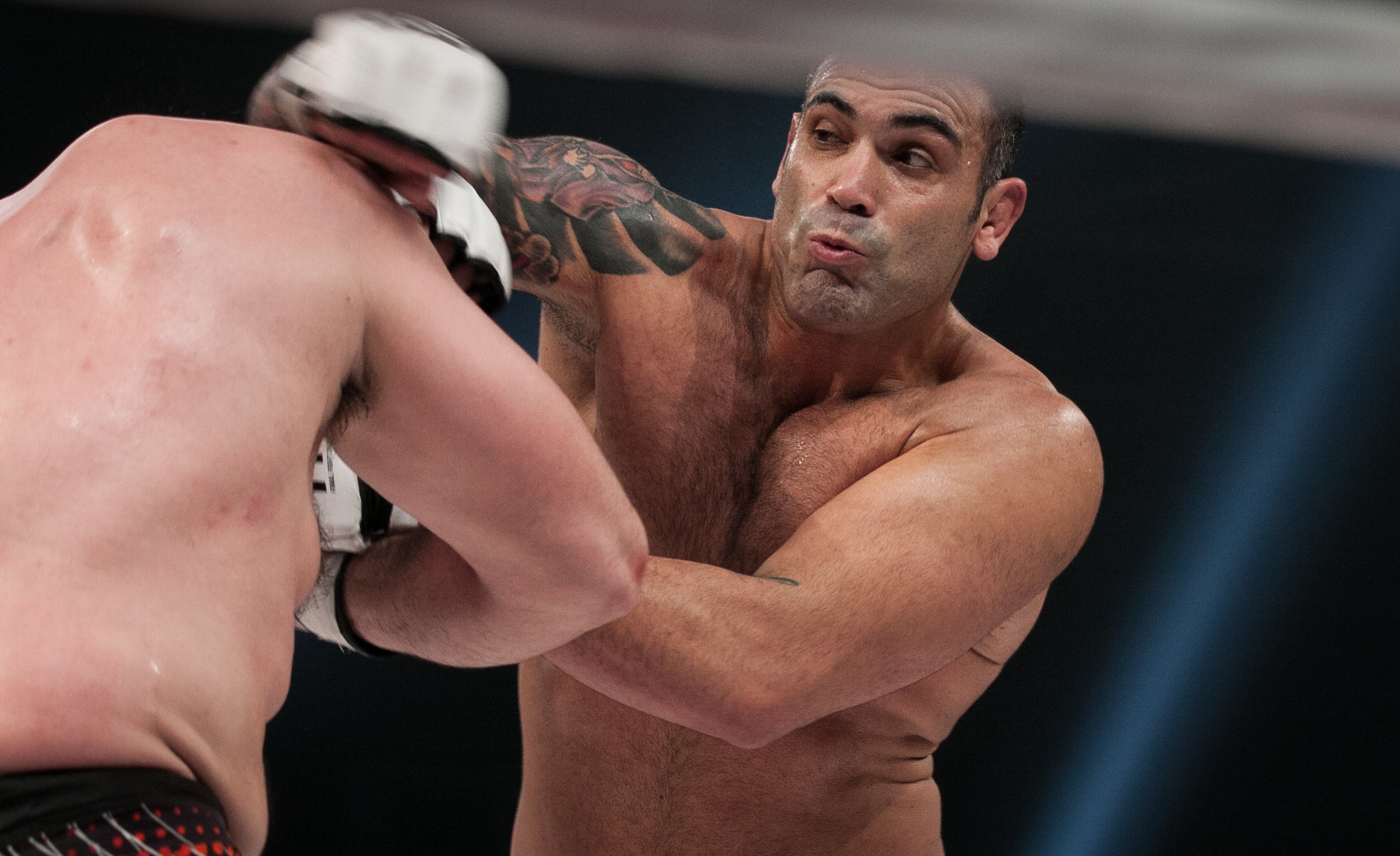
- Rodriguez shortly after his win against Tomaz Simonic on May 24, 2013
- Born: August 19, 1977 (age 49); San Jose, California, U.S.
- Other names: Suave
- Height: 6 ft 4 in (193 cm)
- Weight: 245 lb (111 kg; 17 st 7 lb)
- Division: Heavyweight; Super Heavyweight
- Reach: 77 in (196 cm)
- Style: Brazilian Jiu jitsu, Boxing
- Stance: Southpaw
- Fighting out of: Staten Island, New York, U.S.
- Team: American Fight Club; Ricco Rodriguez Fighting
- Rank: Third degree black belt in Brazilian jiu-jitsu
- Years active: 1999–2019

Professional boxing record
- Total: 2
- Wins: 1
- By knockout: 1
- Losses: 1

Mixed martial arts record
- Total: 82
- Wins: 54
- By knockout: 17
- By submission: 25
- By decision: 12
- Losses: 27
- By knockout: 11
- By decision: 16
- No contests: 1

Other information
- Boxing record from BoxRec
- Mixed martial arts record from Sherdog

Ricco Rodriguez (born August 19, 1977) is an American former mixed martial artist who competed in the heavyweight division. A professional competitor from 1999 to 2019, he competed for the UFC, PRIDE Fighting Championships, EliteXC, International Fight League, BAMMA, World Extreme Cagefighting, and Bellator. Ricco is a former UFC Heavyweight Champion, Mundials World Champion and also an ADCC World Champion. He is also the former King of the Cage World Heavyweight Champion.

== Early life ==
Rodriguez was born in San Jose, California and grew up in the projects in Paterson, New Jersey. Rodriguez wrestled at Tottenville High School while living in Staten Island, New York. He later moved to California and began training in the art of Brazilian Jiu-Jitsu with Rigan and Jean Jacques Machado. He competed and won many Jiu-Jitsu tournaments before moving on to mixed martial arts.

== Mixed martial arts career ==
In 1997, Ricco Rodriguez became one of the small group of Americans to win a Brazilian Jiu-Jitsu World Championship, taking the Blue Belt Absolute title. He took gold in +99 kg in the first ADCC Submission Wrestling World Championship in 1998, bronze in the Absolute (open weight) division in 1999 and Silver in the +99 kg category in 2000. That same year Rodriguez began his MMA career with a win against Rocky Batastini. He won several of his first matches before losing to Bobby Hoffman at the Superbrawl 13 event in Hawaii. He later fought in the PRIDE Fighting Championship before moving on to the Ultimate Fighting Championship.

=== Ultimate Fighting Championship ===
Rodriguez's first UFC match was at UFC 32 against future UFC Heavyweight Champion and #1 ranked pound for pound fighter in the world Andrei Arlovski which he won by TKO. He was scheduled to fight Lion’s Den fighter and owner of one of the most vicious knockouts of the time Pete Williams at UFC 33, but the fight was postponed until UFC 34 due to an injury suffered by Williams during training.

Rodriguez went on to beat Williams, Jeff Monson (UFC 35) and Tsuyoshi Kohsaka (UFC 37) to earn a shot for the vacant heavyweight championship against future UFC Hall of Famer Randy Couture at UFC 39 becoming the first person of Puerto Rican descent to win the UFC Heavyweight Championship. Rodriguez was losing on the scorecard in the initial rounds. In the fifth round Rodriguez was able to achieve a ground-and-pound victory with a stoppage by verbal tapout. In his first title defense, he was knocked out by 6'8 up and coming striker Tim Sylvia in the first round, thus losing the belt.

=== Independent promotions ===
Following the end of his UFC contract, Rodriguez fought for a number of regional and national promotions. He also gained a significant amount of weight, at one point weighing 350 pounds (160 kg). On July 22, 2006, in a rematch of their August 2005 bout in the WEC, he avenged a loss to Ron Waterman at WFA: King of the Streets. He fought as a superheavyweight, weighing in at 300 pounds (140 kg), and was quoted as saying "I'm fat but I still got skills."

Following his win against Imani Lee on November 17, 2006, Rodriguez was put under indefinite suspension by the California State Athletic Commission. The Wrestling Observer Newsletter reported that Rodriguez had tested positive for both marijuana and cocaine and was subsequently given a six-month suspension for the failed drug test.

On July 27, 2007, Ricco Rodriguez, in his first fight after his suspension, defeated Lloyd Marshbanks by first-round TKO at MMA Xtreme 13, which was held in Puebla, Mexico. At the IFL championship finals, he lost to "Big" Ben Rothwell by unanimous decision.

Rodriguez fought in the YAMMA Pit Fighting one-night heavyweight tournament as a late replacement. He defeated George Bush III in the first round by unanimous decision, but was beaten by eventual champion Travis Wiuff in the semi-finals by unanimous decision.

Ricco Rodriguez was scheduled to replace an injured Kevin Randleman in a rematch of their UFC 35 bout against Jeff Monson at the inaugural Godz of War show. That event was canceled, however, and the fight was rescheduled for the inaugural Mixed Fighting Alliance (MFA) event, which Rodriguez lost by unanimous decision.

At the 2009 ADCC qualifiers Rodriguez weighed in at a svelte 218 lb, down well over 100 lb from his peak in the mid-2000s. Rodriguez attributed his weight loss to a renewed focus and partnership with a new nutritional coach and long-time friend, Richard Sicola-Stone.

Rodriguez missed weight for his first attempt at fighting at 205 pounds at the inaugural Israel Fighting Championship event on Nov. 9. He still fought and won his fight over Daniel Tabera, however, and then promptly challenged his friend, Jeff Monson for a rubber match, to a fight at 205 pounds.

Ricco Rodriguez made his BAMMA debut facing The Ultimate Fighter 10 alumni and UFC veteran James McSweeney who was also making his debut for the promotion. Dana White has claimed if Rodriguez wins this bout he will consider resigning him to the UFC. Rodriguez missed weight for the fight, weighing in a full 2 pounds over the contracted 215-pound catchweight.

Ricco made his Bellator debut against the man who first defeated the internet superstar Kimbo Slice, Seth Petruzelli at Bellator 48. He lost the fight via KO (punches) in the first round after getting caught with an overhand right, and ending his 12-fight winning streak.

On April 15, 2013, it was announced that Ricco signed a 3-fight contract for Final Fight Championship. His first fight for the promotion was at FFC05: Rodriguez vs. Simonič event on May 24. 2013, when he fought Slovenian Tomaž Simonič. He won the fight via first round armbar.

On November 9, 2013, he lost to Denis Stojnić on Bosnia Fight Championship event by TKO after an early referee stoppage. Rodriguez immediately stood up and protested the stoppage and left the fight showing the middle finger to the referee. It was announced that they would have a rematch in 2014, also in Sarajevo, however the day after the event, the referee said he was not up to the task and the fight result was changed to NC.

In his next fight, Rodriguez faced Nestoras Batzelas at Final Fight Championship 10 on December 13, 2013. He won the fight via TKO. He then faced Dion Staring for the FFC Heavyweight Championship at Final Fight Championship 17 on December 20, 2014. Despite coming out strong in the opening minute of the first round, Rodriguez would be dropped by a front kick from Staring midway through the first round and subsequently beaten up by ground and pound, and lost the bout via retirement TKO after failing to answer the bell for the third round. After a series of losses, including a match with former PRIDE star Gilbert Yvel, Rodriguez won the CFS Heavyweight title in Graz, Austria defeating Nandor Guelmino.

== Boxing career ==
Rodriguez made his professional boxing debut on October 12, 2006, beating 19-year-old Cruiserweight Brandon Baker by knockout. On July 8, 2008, Rodriguez fought his second professional boxing bout losing via split decision to Chad Davies, who came into the fight with a 0-1 record.

== Bare knuckle boxing ==
Rodriguez faced Lewis Rumsey at BKFC 1 held on June 2, 2018. He won the fight via unanimous decision.

== Other appearances ==
Rodriguez appeared in an episode of the History Channel series Human Weapon, in which he faced Bill Duff in a draw. He also appears in bonus footage of The Smashing Machine: The Life and Times of Extreme Fighter Mark Kerr DVD.

Rodriguez has appeared on season one of the VH1 reality television show Celebrity Rehab with Dr. Drew, which documented his struggle with substance abuse.

== Personal life ==
Rodriguez has a daughter and one son.

== Championships and accomplishments ==
=== Mixed martial arts ===
- King of the Cage
  - KOTC Heavyweight Championship (One time)
- Ultimate Fighting Championship
  - UFC Heavyweight Championship (One time)
  - UFC Encyclopedia Awards
    - Fight of the Night (Two times) vs. Andrei Arlovski and Randy Couture
    - Knockout of the Night (One time) vs. Tsuyoshi Kohsaka
  - Tied for fourth most consecutive knockouts in UFC history (5)
- YAMMA Pit Fighting
  - YAMMA Heavyweight Tournament Semifinalist
- Ultimate Warrior Challenge
  - UWC Heavyweight Championship (One time)
  - UWC British Heavyweight Championship (One time)
- Cage Fight Series
  - CFS Heavyweight Championship (One time)

=== Submission grappling ===
- ADCC
  - ADCC 1998 Over 99 Division - Gold Medalist
  - ADCC 1999 Absolute Division - Bronze Medalist
  - ADCC 2000 Over 99 Division - Silver Medalist

== Mixed martial arts record ==
Professional record breakdown
82 matches	54 wins	27 losses
By knockout	17	11
By submission	25	0
By decision	12	16
No contests	1	

Res.	Record	Opponent	Method	Event	Date	Round	Time	Location	Notes
Loss	54–27 (1)	Hatef Moeil	Decision (unanimous)	Cage Fight Series 9	February 2, 2019	3	5:00	Graz, Austria	
Loss	54–26 (1)	Alex Nicholson	TKO (submission to punches)	AFC 24: CamSoda Legends	April 26, 2018	1	1:27	Fort Lauderdale, Florida, United States	
Win	54–25 (1)	Nandor Guelmino	Submission (forearm choke)	Cage Fight Series 8	January 21, 2018	3	2:30	Graz, Austria	Won the CFS Heavyweight Championship.
Loss	53–25 (1)	Gilbert Yvel	TKO (leg kicks)	WFCA 31	November 19, 2016	1	1:00	Grozny, Russia	
Loss	53–24 (1)	Ivan Shtyrkov	TKO (punches)	Titov Boxing Promotion: Shtyrkov vs. Rodriguez	September 9, 2016	1	1:55	Yekaterinburg, Russia	
Loss	53–23 (1)	Denis Stojnić	TKO (punches)	Bosnia Fight Championship 2	June 13, 2015	2	0:22	Sarajevo, Bosnia and Herzegovina	
Loss	53–22 (1)	Dion Staring	TKO (retirement)	Final Fight Championship 17	December 20, 2014	2	5:00	Opatija, Croatia	For the FFC Heavyweight Championship.
Win	53–21 (1)	Nestoras Batzelas	TKO (punches)	Final Fight Championship 10	December 13, 2013	2	3:33	Skopje, Macedonia	
NC	52–21 (1)	Denis Stojnić	NC	Bosnian Fight Championship 1	November 9, 2013	1	4:55	Sarajevo, Bosnia and Herzegovina	Originally TKO loss, overturned due to early stoppage.
Win	52–21	Zelg Galešić	Submission (armbar)	Final Fight Championship 8	October 25, 2013	1	2:10	Zagreb, Croatia	Catchweight (95 kg).
Loss	51–21	Ian Freeman	TKO (punches)	UCFC 5: Legends of MMA	July 27, 2013	1	2:11	Doncaster, England	
Loss	51–20	Marcin Lazarz	Decision (unanimous)	GWC: The British Invasion: US vs. UK	June 29, 2013	3	5:00	Kansas City, Missouri, United States	
Win	51–19	Tomaz Simonic	Submission (armbar)	FFC: Final Fight Championship 5	May 24, 2013	1	3:49	Osijek, Croatia	
Win	50–19	Andreas Kraniotakes	Decision (unanimous)	CFS 7: Cage Fight Series 7	May 12, 2013	3	5:00	Unterpremstätten, Styria, Austria	
Loss	49–19	Ante Delija	Decision (unanimous)	HOG: House of Gladiators 1	December 21, 2012	2	5:00	Dubrovnik, Croatia	
Win	49–18	Kevin Thompson	Submission (armbar)	UWC 21: Xplosion	October 20, 2012	1	4:45	Southend-on-Sea, Essex, England	
Loss	48–18	Stav Economou	Decision (unanimous)	Dubai FC 1: The Beginning	May 4, 2012	3	5:00	Dubai, United Arab Emirates	
Loss	48–17	Ruslan Magomedov	Decision (unanimous)	United Glory 15: 2012 Glory World Series	March 23, 2012	3	5:00	Moscow, Moscow Oblast, Russia	
Loss	48–16	Alexander Volkov	Decision (unanimous)	BF: Baltic Challenge 3	February 23, 2012	3	5:00	Kaliningrad, Russia	
Loss	48–15	Blagoi Ivanov	TKO (retirement)	CMMAT: Chekhov MMA Tournament	December 24, 2011	3	3:33	Chekhov, Moscow Oblast, Russia	
Win	48–14	Bashir Yamilkhanov	TKO (punches)	FEFoMP: Battle of Empires	December 17, 2011	2	2:56	Khabarovsk, Khabarovsk Krai, Russia	
Loss	47–14	Glover Teixeira	TKO (submission to punches)	MMAAD: MMA Against Dengue	November 27, 2011	1	1:58	Duque de Caxias, Rio de Janeiro, Brazil	
Loss	47–13	Michał Kita	Decision (unanimous)	MMAA: MMA Attack	November 5, 2011	2	5:00	Warsaw, Masovian Voivodeship, Poland	
Loss	47–12	Seth Petruzelli	TKO (punches)	Bellator 48	August 20, 2011	1	4:21	Uncasville, Connecticut, United States	
Win	47–11	Doug Williams	Submission (rear-naked choke)	Shark Fights 17: Horwich vs. Rosholt 2	July 15, 2011	1	2:16	Frisco, Texas, United States	
Win	46–11	James McSweeney	Decision (unanimous)	BAMMA 5: Daley vs. Shirai	February 26, 2011	3	5:00	Manchester, England	
Win	45–11	Daniel Tabera	Decision (unanimous)	Israel Fighting Championship: Genesis	November 9, 2010	3	5:00	Tel Aviv, Israel	
Win	44–11	John Juarez	Decision (split)	USA MMA: Stacked	July 31, 2010	3	5:00	Baton Rouge, Louisiana, United States	
Win	43–11	Bobby Martinez	Submission (heel hook)	AFA 4: Parking Lot Beatdown	July 17, 2010	1	1:03	Fort Wayne, Indiana, United States	
Win	42–11	Ken Sparks	TKO (punches)	USA MMA: Legends	May 22, 2010	1	2:32	Kinder, Louisiana, United States	
Win	41–11	Travis Fulton	KO (head kick)	CT: Cage Thug	May 1, 2010	1	N/A	Waterloo, Iowa, United States	
Win	40–11	Brian Ryan	TKO (punches)	XKL: Evolution 1	March 20, 2010	2	2:05	Ypsilanti, Michigan, United States	
Win	39–11	Patrick Miller	TKO (punches)	STFC 10: Annihilation	February 26, 2010	2	2:20	McAllen, Texas, United States	
Win	38–11	Moise Rimbon	Decision (split)	IAFC: Mayor's Cup 2009	November 27, 2009	3	3:00	Novosibirsk, Novosibirsk Oblast, Russia	
Win	37–11	Justin Howard	TKO (submission to punches)	KOK 7: Judgement Day	August 29, 2009	1	2:05	Austin, Texas, United States	
Win	36–11	John Brown	Submission (rear-naked choke)	Reality Combat: The Return	July 25, 2009	3	2:34	Slidell, Louisiana, United States	
Loss	35–11	Mario Rinaldi	Decision (unanimous)	WFC: Battle Of The Bay 8	July 10, 2009	3	5:00	Tampa, Florida, United States	
Win	35–10	Doug Williams	Submission (anaconda choke)	Armagedon Fighting Championships 09	June 27, 2009	1	1:02	Tyler, Texas, United States	
Loss	34–10	Jeff Monson	Decision (unanimous)	Mixed Fighting Alliance "There Will Be Blood"	December 13, 2008	3	5:00	Miami, Florida, United States	
Win	34–9	Robert Beraun	Decision (unanimous)	Rage in the Cage 117	November 8, 2008	3	3:00	Phoenix, Arizona, United States	
Win	33–9	Rob Broughton	Submission (kneebar)	Cage Gladiators 9	October 4, 2008	2	3:39	Liverpool, England	
Win	32–9	Titus Campbell	Submission (guillotine choke)	Silver Crown Fights	August 8, 2008	2	3:06	Fort Wayne, Indiana, United States	
Win	31–9	Johnathan Ivey	Decision (unanimous)	Xp3: The Proving Ground	July 26, 2008	3	3:00	Houston, Texas, United States	
Win	30–9	Chris Guillen	Submission (armbar)	Ultimate Combat Experience 1	June 27, 2008	1	4:30	West Valley City, Utah, United States	
Loss	29–9	Travis Wiuff	Decision (unanimous)	YAMMA Pit Fighting	April 11, 2008	1	5:00	Atlantic City, New Jersey, United States	YAMMA Heavyweight Tournament Semifinal.
Win	29–8	George Bush	Decision (unanimous)	YAMMA Pit Fighting	April 11, 2008	1	5:00	Atlantic City, New Jersey, United States	YAMMA Heavyweight Tournament Semifinal.
Loss	28–8	Antônio Silva	Decision (split)	EliteXC: Street Certified	February 16, 2008	3	5:00	Miami, Florida, United States	
Win	28–7	Kevin Filal	TKO (retirement)	PFP: Ring of Fire	December 9, 2007	1	N/A	Manila, Philippines	
Loss	27–7	Ben Rothwell	Decision (unanimous)	IFL 2007 World Championship Finals	September 20, 2007	3	4:00	Hollywood, Florida, United States	
Win	27–6	Lloyd Marshbanks	TKO (punches)	MMA Xtreme 13	July 28, 2007	1	3:11	Tijuana, Mexico	
Win	26–6	Imani Lee	Submission (rear-naked choke)	BIB: Beatdown in Bakersfield	November 17, 2006	1	2:12	Bakersfield, California, United States	
Win	25–6	Abdias Irisson	TKO (punches)	MMA Xtreme 7	November 11, 2006	1	N/A	Tijuana, Mexico	
Win	24–6	Ron Waterman	TKO (doctor stoppage)	WFA: King of the Streets	July 22, 2006	1	5:00	Los Angeles, California, United States	
Win	23–6	Taylor Brooks	Submission (armbar)	MMA Xtreme 1	March 25, 2006	1	N/A	Tijuana, Mexico	
Loss	22–6	Robert Beraun	Decision (unanimous)	RITC 78: Back with a Vengeance	January 14, 2006	3	3:00	Glendale, Arizona, United States	
Win	22–5	Tyler Brooks	Submission (armbar)	Pro Fight League	December 9, 2005	1	4:00	Phoenix, Arizona, United States	
Win	21–5	David Mori	Decision (unanimous)	MMA Fighting Challenge 4	December 3, 2005	3	5:00	Guadalajara, Mexico	
Win	20–5	Corey Salter	Submission (armbar)	Ultimate Texas Showdown 3	November 26, 2005	2	0:17	Dallas, Texas, United States	
Win	19–5	Jimmy Ambriz	TKO (submission to punches)	WEC 17	October 14, 2005	1	4:13	Lemoore, California, United States	
Loss	18–5	Ron Waterman	Decision (unanimous)	WEC 16	August 18, 2005	3	5:00	Lemoore, California, United States	For the WEC Super Heavyweight Championship.
Win	18–4	Andy Montana	Submission (armbar)	Independent event	July 15, 2005	1	1:50	Fountain Hills, Arizona, United States	
Win	17–4	Ruben Villareal	Submission (armbar)	Extreme Wars: X-1	July 2, 2005	1	2:38	Honolulu, Hawaii, United States	
Win	16–4	Scott Junk	Submission (front choke)	Rumble on the Rock 7	May 7, 2005	2	0:42	Honolulu, Hawaii, United States	
Win	15–4	Mike Seal	Submission (rear-naked choke)	MMA Mexico: Day 2	December 18, 2004	1	1:06	Ciudad Juárez, Mexico	
Loss	14–4	Pedro Rizzo	Decision (unanimous)	UFC 45	November 21, 2003	3	5:00	Uncasville, Connecticut, United States	
Loss	14–3	Antônio Rodrigo Nogueira	Decision (unanimous)	PRIDE Total Elimination 2003	August 10, 2003	3	5:00	Saitama, Japan	
Loss	14–2	Tim Sylvia	TKO (punches)	UFC 41	February 28, 2003	1	3:09	Atlantic City, New Jersey, United States	Lost the UFC Heavyweight Championship.
Win	14–1	Randy Couture	TKO (submission to elbow)	UFC 39	September 27, 2002	5	3:04	Uncasville, Connecticut, United States	Won the vacant UFC Heavyweight Championship.
Win	13–1	Tsuyoshi Kohsaka	TKO (punches)	UFC 37	May 10, 2002	2	3:25	Bossier City, Louisiana, United States	
Win	12–1	Jeff Monson	TKO (punches)	UFC 35	January 11, 2002	3	3:00	Uncasville, Connecticut, United States	
Win	11–1	Pete Williams	TKO (punches)	UFC 34	November 2, 2001	2	4:02	Las Vegas, Nevada, United States	
Win	10–1	Andrei Arlovski	TKO (punches)	UFC 32	June 29, 2001	3	1:23	East Rutherford, New Jersey, United States	
Win	9–1	Paul Buentello	Submission (kneebar)	KOTC 7: Wet and Wild	February 24, 2001	2	4:21	San Jacinto, California, United States	Won the KOTC Openweight Superfight Championship.
Win	8–1	John Marsh	Decision (unanimous)	PRIDE 12	December 23, 2000	2	5:00	Saitama, Japan	
Win	7–1	Giant Ochiai	Submission (smother choke)	PRIDE 10	August 27, 2000	1	6:04	Saitama, Japan	
Win	6–1	Gary Goodridge	Decision (unanimous)	PRIDE 9	June 4, 2000	2	10:00	Nagoya, Japan	
Win	5–1	Travis Fulton	Submission (armbar)	KOTC 2: Desert Storm	February 5, 2000	1	4:49	San Jacinto, California, United States	
Win	4–1	Sam Adkins	Submission (forearm choke)	Armageddon 2	November 23, 1999	1	4:32	Houston, Texas, United States	
Loss	3–1	Bobby Hoffman	KO (punches)	SuperBrawl 13	September 7, 1999	1	3:13	Honolulu, Hawaii, United States	
Win	3–0	Steve Shaw	Submission (armbar)	Rage in the Cage 6	July 10, 1999	1	1:34	Phoenix, Arizona, United States	
Win	2–0	Rocky Batastini	Submission (armbar)	Extreme Cage	March 25, 1999	1	4:58	Phoenix, Arizona, United States	
Win	1–0	Scott Adams	Decision	Extreme Cage	March 25, 1999	3	4:00	Phoenix, Arizona, United States	

== Bare knuckle record ==
Professional record breakdown
1 match	1 win	0 losses
By decision	1	0

Res.	Record	Opponent	Method	Event	Date	Round	Time	Location	Notes
Win	1–0	Lewis Rumsey	Decision (unanimous)	BKFC 1	June 2, 2018	5	2:00	Cheyenne, Wyoming, United States	

Preceded by Josh Barnett	UFC Heavyweight champion September 27, 2002 – February 28, 2003	Succeeded by Tim Sylvia
