= The Smashing Machine: The Life and Times of Extreme Fighter Mark Kerr =

Mixed martial arts documentary

- Directed by: John Hyams
- Produced by: Jon Greenhalgh
- Starring: Mark Kerr
- Cinematography: Stephen Schlueter
- Music by: Boxhead Ensemble
- Production company: HBO Documentary Films
- Distributed by: HBO
- Release date: 2002
- Running time: 92 minutes
- Country: United States
- Languages: English; Portuguese

The Smashing Machine: The Life and Times of Extreme Fighter Mark Kerr is a 2002 American documentary film directed by John Hyams about the mixed martial arts career and personal life of Mark Kerr. The documentary received critical acclaim for its sobering account of the brutal sport of early no holds barred fighting and the depths of addiction to which Kerr succumbs and eventually overcomes.

It premiered on May 31, 2002, on HBO.

== Overview ==
The documentary begins with Kerr being examined by a physician, sporting a black eye and complaining of shoulder and knee pain. One of the well-known parts of the film is Kerr trying to explain the mental state of a mixed martial artist to an elderly woman in the waiting room. The documentary then delves into Kerr's background as an amateur wrestler and his family's lack of support for his career decision, an important factor that affects Kerr's personal relationships.

Kerr's first MMA tournament, and no holds barred tournament in São Paulo, Brazil called the World Vale Tudo Championships is shown. You see his first opponent, UFC veteran Paul Varelans, and his second fight against Mestre Hulk. And finally Fábio Gurgel; all three fights which he won. The path of destruction laid by Kerr in the tournament catapulted him into the spotlight and earned him the nickname "The Smashing Machine."

The documentary then shows Kerr's brief and successful Ultimate Fighting Championship career. The documentary then briefly tells of the UFC's problems in the U.S. with politicians and reluctant cable television operators. The loss of TV exposure and subsequent ban on "ultimate fighting" by most major cities forced the UFC underground and into near bankruptcy.

Kerr makes a financial decision to jump to the more lucrative Pride Fighting Championships in Japan. Whereas the UFC was forced to hold shows in small towns in the Deep South with little TV exposure, Pride held their shows in Japan's largest stadiums averaging around 50,000 people a show and were shown on national television. Kerr continued where he left off in the UFC, dominating the competition in Pride. Kerr emerged as the number one heavyweight in the world and became an international star. The documentary then introduces us to Kerr's girlfriend Dawn. We then see the depths of Kerr's reliance on painkillers and other narcotics including a graphic scene of Kerr shooting the drug into a vein in his arm.

Mark Coleman is introduced. A former rival of Kerr in amateur wrestling and now his mentor. Coleman is the innovator of the brutal ground and pound style. Coleman is cornering Kerr for his upcoming match against Igor Vovchanchyn. Kerr starts off strong against Vovchanchyn taking him down early on and utilizing the ground and pound but Kerr eats a hard right hand that knocks him down and shifts the momentum of the fight. Kerr is gassed and down on his hands and knees. He eats a hard knee to the side of his head. A couple more knees and Kerr slumps to the mat. Kerr gets up and he's upset the referee stopped the fight. Kerr believes the knee strikes by Vovchanchyn are illegal and a foul should've been called. Kerr states his case to a Pride official. Pride rules the fight a no contest due to illegal knee strikes from Vovchanchyn. Kerr describes the feeling he gets from fighting as orgasmic and says nothing can compare to the high of fighting.

Kerr is on the hunt for pain medication. Dawn threatens to leave Mark if he doesn't get clean. Kerr explains to us the depths of which the narcotics have a hold on his life saying he is slowly losing control of his life. As Kerr slips deeper into addiction we get a closer look into the personal life of Mark Coleman. Coleman is trying to get his career back on track after a string of losses in the UFC including some brutal knockouts.

In October 1999, Kerr is in the hospital after overdosing on narcotics. Kerr can't stay awake for more than 30 seconds and his prognosis is grim. In his room Kerr explains his mental state to two friends, Kerr describes himself as aware of his surroundings but unable to function. On the ambulance ride Kerr identifies the current President of the U.S. as Ronald Reagan. At that point the joking stops and Kerr is faced with the realization that he is in need of serious help. Kerr breaks down and cries. We then witness the extreme lengths of Kerr's addictions as he goes home and throws out garbage bags full of narcotics and needles. Kerr withdraws from his November fight and checks himself into rehab.

With Kerr in rehab for a month the documentary now focuses on Coleman and his upcoming fight with Ricardo Morais. Coleman is victorious in his comeback fight. In December 1999, Kerr is discharged from the Sierra Tucson rehab center. The documentary reveals Dawn is a recovering alcoholic. We see the strains on the relationship as Kerr tries to continue to be sober as Dawn relapses. Kerr and Dawn separate. Kerr is entered into the PRIDE Grand Prix 2000 Finals. Kerr is grappling with himself about whether he wants to continue fighting or not. Coleman is also in the tournament. Kerr's first fight is with Enson Inoue. To prepare for the fight Kerr enlists the services of fighter Bas Rutten. We then witness the intense training regimen that Rutten puts Kerr through. Free from distractions Kerr looks in top form.

January 2000, Kerr is ready to fight Inoue. Kerr brutalizes Inoue with the ground and pound. Inoue is overpowered and overmatched and Kerr is victorious. Kerr advances to the quarterfinals of the Grand Prix. Coleman also advances setting up a possible showdown between the two friends.

Dawn is back in the picture. Mark explains that after fighting he wants the comfort and security that Dawn provides. Mark feels he can't handle the ensuing depression after a fight on his own and needs someone else. Bas disagrees and says when you are training for a fight you need to be free of stress and distractions. Bas feels Mark should separate from Dawn. Mark is torn between Bas and Dawn but ultimately chooses to leave Bas's camp early to drive back to Phoenix with Dawn. Bas feels Mark should stay until he leaves for Japan. Coleman is undergoing his own intensive training at the Ohio State University wrestling complex. As the fight draws closer Kerr continues to train but his relationship sours. Kerr describes a fight that escalated to the point where police were called and Dawn grabbed Mark's unloaded gun off his nightstand and starts gouging into her arms with razors.

Kerr feels that this fight is redemption from where he was. Kerr has drawn Kazuyuki Fujita for his quarterfinal fight. Kerr starts off strong against Fujita, dominating him with ground and pound and landing several hard punches and knees to the head. As the fight wears on however, Kerr tires and Fujita goes on the offensive landing several hard shots while Kerr's are ineffective. Fujita takes Kerr's back and lands a barrage of unanswered blows to Kerr's head. On his hands and knees all Kerr can do is cover up while Fujita tees off with punches to the head and knees to the body. Bas looks down as Kerr continues to take punishment. A beaten Kerr collapses on a mat in the dressing room. Bas cannot hide his disappointment as Kerr is informed he needs stitches for a split chin due to the hard knees to the face.

As Kerr and Coleman meet in the back, Kerr informs Coleman that Fujita has injury defaulted meaning Coleman will get a bye. Kerr tells Coleman that "it's yours to win." As Mark Kerr gets stitched up Coleman meets Igor Vovchanchyn in the final. In his most impressive performance in years Coleman dominates Vovchanchyn, taking him down and getting him a precarious position against the ropes. Several unanswered knees to the head later and Vovchanchyn taps. Coleman celebrates his victory and redemption as Kerr continues to get stitched up.

Epilogue: Mark and Dawn marry a few months later in Las Vegas and reside in Scottsdale, Arizona.

== Reception ==
The film gained mostly positive reviews.
