= Gracie Challenge =

Contest invitation by the Gracie family to martial artists

The Gracie Challenge was an open invitation challenge match issued by members of the Gracie family, representing their self-defense system of Gracie jiu-jitsu against challengers of other martial art systems in a vale tudo match, or "anything goes" competition.

A precursor to the Ultimate Fighting Championship (UFC), the purpose of these challenges was to prove the effectiveness of the Gracie style of BJJ over all other martial arts styles in an era before the advent of modern mixed martial arts. Challenges have been issued since Carlos Gracie first made one in the 1920s; some were public events and others have remained private.

== History ==
The Gracie challenge was first issued by then judoka Carlos Gracie in the 1920s to promote and develop the Gracie's style of Brazilian jiu-jitsu, and as an attempt to show that it was superior to other styles of martial arts. The matches typically featured a smaller Gracie versus a larger and/or more athletic looking opponent, and became increasingly popular. Carlos and later his brother Hélio Gracie and both of these men's sons defeated martial artists of many different styles such as boxing, savate, judo, karate, and wrestling, while experiencing few losses. Euclydes "Mestre Tatu" Hatem, creator of Luta Livre (a Brazilian adaptation of catch wrestling focused on submissions), defeated George Gracie in a historic match. Years later, in 1968, his student Euclides Pereira repeated this feat by defeating Carlson Gracie.

=== Hélio Gracie vs Masahiko Kimura ===
Hélio Gracie issued a challenge to a highly touted judoka named Masahiko Kimura. An agreement was made under what would be known as the "Gracie Rules" via the Gracie Challenge that throws and pins would not count towards victory; only submission or loss of consciousness would do so. This played against judo rules in which pins and throws can award someone a victory. Kimura would go on to defeat Hélio in 14 minutes. Kimura broke Hélio's arm during the match with a reverse ude-garami after applying a number of submissions. According to Kimura in his book My Judo, he thought of Hélio Gracie to be a 6th dan judoka at the time of his fight with him in 1951.

=== Fadda Academy vs Gracie Academy ===
In 1951 jiu-jitsu instructor Oswaldo Fadda issued a challenge to the Gracie Academy to prove his worth. The contest was proposed through O Globo ("The Globe"), Brazil's most popular publication. “We wish to challenge the Gracies. We respect them like the formidable adversaries they are, but we do not fear them. We have 20 pupils ready for the dispute.”—Oswaldo Fadda

Hélio Gracie accepted the challenge to have his students face Fadda's and the matches took place at the Gracie Academy. Fadda's team won, making better use of their footlock knowledge, something the Gracies lacked and frowned upon ever since, calling it “suburban technique” (Técnica de Suburbano). The highlight of the competition was when Fadda's pupil José Guimarães choked Gracie's student “Leonidas” unconscious.

=== Master vs Student ===
In 1952, Helio would face a former student Valdemar Santana, who in a 3-hour and 45 minute match would defeat Helio. Santana would go on to knock out Helio with a kick to the head. This would be the last of Helio's matches that involved striking (i.e. Vale Tudo).

=== Various challenges ===
The Gracie challenge entered American martial arts legend when Rorion Gracie came to the United States to teach Brazilian jiu-jitsu. Rorion upheld the family's tradition and regularly took challenge matches at his facility.

=== Benny Urquidez ===
A common story is that Gracie backed up his challenges with a wager that he would pay the winner $100,000 should he lose. The misconception stemmed from a proposed challenge match with Benny "the Jet" Urquidez, where both Gracie and Urquidez would bet $100,000 on the outcome of the match. However, that match never occurred.

=== Wallid Ismail ===
Wallid Ismail, a jiu-jitsu champion several times over and black belt under Carlson Gracie, defeated four members of the famous Gracie family in competition, representing his master in an intra-family feud that existed between Carlson and Helio Gracie. When fighting against Royce Gracie in 1998, Ismail was the only one who accepted the conditions that Royce proposed for the bout, like having no point scoring and no time limit, thus making the fight only winnable by submission. The fight took four minutes and fifty three seconds, until Wallid defeated Gracie with the Relógio, the Clock Choke, a move that has been associated with Wallid ever since. After his win, Wallid said that if Royce's team wanted a rematch they would have to pay him US$200,000.00, a value that even the Gracies had never been paid at the UFC at that time.

=== Decision after defeat – judo Olympian Yoshida win turned into a no-contest ===
Hidehiko Yoshida, a Judo Gold Medal Olympian, debuted for PRIDE FC in a grappling match against mixed martial arts (MMA) pioneer Royce Gracie at Pride Shockwave in 2002. The fight ended when Yoshida submitted Gracie from a Gi choke, and the referee subsequently ended the fight through stoppage. However, Gracie disputed the stoppage and the fight was later ruled a no contest when the family vowed to never fight for PRIDE again if the win was not turned into a no contest. PRIDE accepted their demands.
