= Nino Schembri =

Brazilian mixed martial arts fighter

- Born: Antônio Schembri; 1 June 1974 (age 52); Rio de Janeiro, Brazil
- Other names: Elvis
- Height: 5 ft 9 in (1.75 m)
- Weight: 176 lb (80 kg; 12.6 st)
- Division: Welterweight; Middleweight
- Style: MMA; Brazilian jiu-jitsu, Submission wrestling, Muay thai, Wrestling
- Team: Gracie Barra Academy; Chute Boxe Academy; Nino Schembri Team
- Rank: black belt in Brazilian jiu-jitsu
- Years active: 2001–2008 (MMA)

Mixed martial arts record
- Total: 10
- Wins: 5
- By knockout: 1
- By submission: 3
- By decision: 1
- Losses: 5
- By knockout: 2
- By decision: 3

Other information
- Notable students: Mauricio Rua, BJJ
- Website: www.omoplataking.com
- Mixed martial arts record from Sherdog

Antônio "Nino" Schembri (Portuguese pronunciation: [ˈninu ˈʃẽbɾi]; born June 1, 1974) is a Brazilian practitioner of Brazilian jiu-jitsu (BJJ) and former mixed martial artist. He is a former member of the Chute Boxe Academy and currently trains with Black House. Schembri is highly accomplished in sport BJJ, having won the 1996 Brazilian National Championship in the absolute division world championships in his weight class back to back in 1997/1998. Schembri has a unique style of Jiu-Jitsu with focus on submission and creative attacks. At 1999 Pan-American he had phenomenal wins and became known as "El Nino", in analogy to the natural phenomenon El Niño.

Schembri is sometimes nicknamed "Elvis" because he is an Elvis Presley fan and used to mimic some of Elvis's dance moves to celebrate his victories. Today, Schembri teaches at his own gym located in Lawndale, California.

== Biography ==
Antônio Schembri was born into an Italian Brazilian family in Rio de Janeiro. In his youth, Schembri worked in his family's street market, helping his Italian-born father selling duvets. He began training in Brazilian jiu-jitsu at age five under Marcelo and Silvio Behring in the New Ipanema neighborhood of Rio de Janeiro, before coming under the tutelage of Jorge Pereira at thirteen. As an 18 year old blue belt, Schembri moved to the Gracie Barra Academy to study under Carlos Gracie Jr. and Renzo Gracie. After training at Gracie Barra for two years, he was promoted to black belt.

Schembri began competing in mixed martial arts (MMA) in 2001 after joining the Pride Fighting Championships in Japan. In his debut match, he defeated Luta Livre fighter Johil de Oliveira at Pride 14 on 27 May 2001. Around that time, Schembri left Gracie Barra and joined the Chute Boxe Academy, where he became the gym's grappling coach while learning striking from Rafael Cordeiro. At Pride 25 on 16 March 2003, Schembri scored the most significant victory of his career by defeating Kazushi Sakuraba by technical knockout. Schembri's father committed suicide in 2004, leaving Nino devastated and affecting his ability to focus and train consistently. During this time period, his record suffered and he retired with a 5-5 MMA record in 2008. Schembri returned to competing in jiu-jitsu in 2010, stating in an interview to the Fightworks Podcast that he was finally recovered mentally from his father's death.

He moved to the United States and opened a jiu-jitsu academy in Lawndale, California.

== Mixed martial arts record ==
Professional record breakdown
10 matches	5 wins	5 losses
By knockout	1	2
By submission	3	0
By decision	1	3

Res.	Record	Opponent	Method	Event	Date	Round	Time	Location	Notes
Loss	5–5	Mauro Chimento Jr.	TKO (punches)	Fury FC 7 - Final Combat	December 5, 2008	1	0:30	Barueri, Brazil	
Win	5–4	Daniel Grandmaison	Submission (armbar)	HCF: Crow's Nest	March 29, 2008	1	2:37	Gatineau, Canada	
Win	4–4	Amir Rahnavardi	Submission (triangle armbar)	MMAC: The Revolution	May 12, 2007	1	0:57	Washington, D.C., United States	
Loss	3–4	Matt Lindland	TKO	Cage Rage 14	December 3, 2005	3	3:33	London, England	
Loss	3–3	Ryo Chonan	Decision (unanimous)	Pride: Bushido 7	May 22, 2005	2	5:00	Tokyo, Japan	
Loss	3–2	Kazushi Sakuraba	Decision (unanimous)	PRIDE Critical Countdown 2004	June 20, 2004	3	5:00	Saitama, Japan	
Loss	3–1	Kazuhiro Hamanaka	Decision (unanimous)	PRIDE 26	June 8, 2003	3	5:00	Yokohama, Japan	
Win	3–0	Kazushi Sakuraba	TKO (knees and soccer kicks)	PRIDE 25	March 16, 2003	1	6:15	Yokohama, Japan	
Win	2–0	Daiju Takase	Decision (split)	PRIDE The Best Vol.2	July 20, 2002	2	5:00	Tokyo, Japan	
Win	1–0	Johil de Oliveira	Submission (armbar)	Pride 14 - Clash of the Titans	May 27, 2001	1	7:17	Yokohama, Japan	

== ADCC Submission Grappling Record ==
4 Matches, 3 Wins (2 Submissions), 1 Loss
Result	Rec.	Opponent	Method	Event	Division	Date	Location
Win	3-1	(Japan) Egan Inoue	Points	ADCC 2001	–88 kg	2001	(United Arab Emirates) Abu Dhabi
Lose	2-1	(Brazil) Saulo Ribeiro	Penaltie	ADCC 2001	–88 kg	2001	(United Arab Emirates) Abu Dhabi
Win	2-0	(Belarus) Alexander Savko	Submission (Omoplata)	ADCC 2001	–88 kg	2001	(United Arab Emirates) Abu Dhabi
Win	1-0	(Japan) Akihiro Gono	Submission (Rear-naked choke)	ADCC 2001	–88 kg	2001	(United Arab Emirates) Abu Dhabi
