= Soccer kick =

Fighting kick performed against a downed opponent

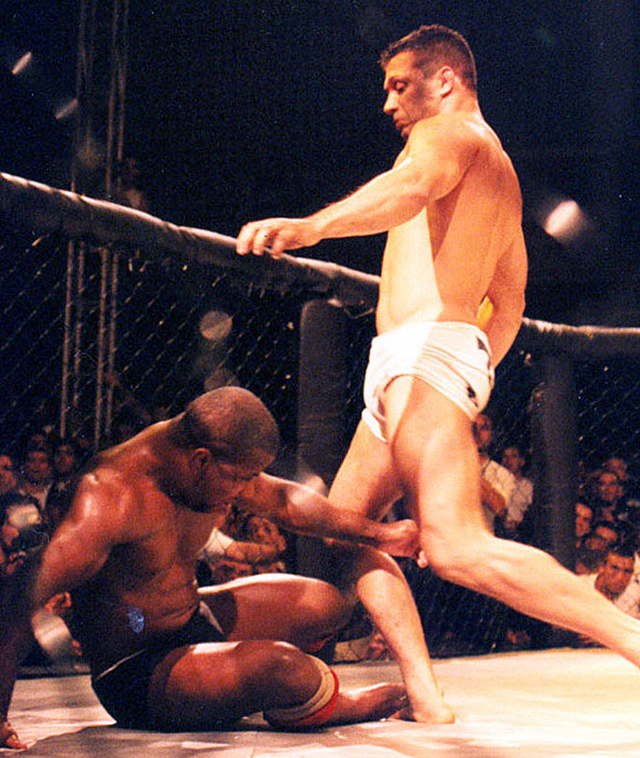
Renzo Gracie soccer kicks Eugenio Tadeu at a Vale Tudo bout in 1997

A soccer kick, also known as a soccer ball kick or PK (penalty kick) in puroresu and shoot fighting, and as tiro de meta in vale tudo, is a reference to a kick that is similar to kicks used in association football. It is the colloquial term for a kick performed against a prone, kneeling, rising or supine opponent by a fighter who is in a standing or semi-standing position, to any part of a downed opponent. The technique is banned under the Unified Rules of Mixed Martial Arts; however, other rulesets, including the ones used by Pride Fighting Championships do permit them. Soccer kicks have been regularly discussed as to their potential damage. There has been a regular debate on the usage of them within MMA. Some MMA fans and fighters support them while a fight doctor and politicians have opposed them.

== Description ==
A soccer kick is performed when a fighter is standing to the side or in front of an opponent on the ground and kicks the grounded opponent's head. This is done in a style similar to an association football player kicking a football. Most practitioners aim to use their shins for the point of impact rather than the foot. While soccer kicks are usually delivered to the head, kicks to other parts of the body in a similar style are also referred to as soccer kicks.

== In mixed martial arts ==
Dr. Johnny Benjamin stated his belief that soccer kicks could cause serious injury, based on the assumption that an MMA fighter would be able to generate the same amount of force in a soccer kick as a professional association football player. Some MMA fans argue that no-one has ever been seriously injured from a soccer kick and stated that there were already equally dangerous moves allowed in MMA. Dr. Johnny Benjamin argued that soccer kicks could result in broken necks and paralysis if performed with the wrong positioning and high velocity.

In 2000, the Unified Rules of Mixed Martial Arts were written with the intention of making the sport of MMA appear more acceptable in a wider society. Under those rules, soccer kicks were explicitly banned and classed as a foul defined as "kicking the head of a grounded opponent." It is noted that while soccer kicks to grounded opponents are fouls, axe kicks, downward strikes with the back of the heel, are not considered fouls if done to any part of a grounded, or "downed", opponent. In the years after the banning of soccer kicks under the Unified Rules, a number of fans and MMA fighters have argued for them to be permitted under the Unified Rules along with face and foot stomps. Their justification is that soccer kicks and stomps being disallowed hindered fighters who were used to using them under other MMA rule sets. Mauricio Rua, who mostly used soccer kicks to earn victories in Pride, argued that elbows caused more pain than soccer kicks and claimed that soccer kicks were safer than elbows. Rua also argued that elbows were more dangerous than soccer kicks and yet were allowed under the unified rules. Opponents of soccer kicks argued that they needed to be banned in order for the sport of MMA to move forward. They also argued that in the face of opposition to the sport from politicians such as John McCain, soccer kicks had to be banned in order to ensure that the sport was not viewed as illegal "human cockfighting" and could be sanctioned as legal in the United States by Athletic Commissions.

Although a soccer kick is a foul when delivered to the head in the Unified Rules of Mixed Martial Arts which prevail in North America, the technique was commonly employed in Pride Fighting Championships in Japan. Fighters Wanderlei Silva and Mauricio Rua were notable practitioners of the soccer kick in MMA. Under the Unified Rules, some MMA fighters attempted to use tactics with the "kicking the head of a grounded opponent" rule, which defined a fighter as grounded if they had any part of their body apart from their feet on the ground. This meant that fighters, such as Jon Jones, would often try to provoke illegal soccer kicks by putting their hand on the ground or as a way to avoid strikes such as the soccer kick after a failed takedown. However, in 2013, referees were encouraged to interpret the rules that if a fighter is deliberately intending to provoke an illegal soccer kick and one was used, then the referee could decide that it was a legal move. In 2024, the Unified Rules were amended to state that a fighter had to have any part of their body, other than their feet or hands, touching the ground to be considered downed.

There are still MMA organizations such as Japanese-based Rizin Fighting Federation that allow soccer kicks to the head of downed opponent. ONE Fighting Championship previously had an "open attack" rule, which required fighters to get permission from the referee to use soccer kicks. In 2012, the company changed its rule set to the rules used by Pride Fighting Championship allowing fighters to use soccer kicks without asking for permission from the referee. ONE banned soccer kicks entirely in August 2016 as part of the company's worldwide expansion plans. Their CEO Chatri Sityodtong stated that despite studies showing that soccer kicks are the same as a normal head kick because you cannot generate any more pivotal force, the technique invites "bad publicity".

== In professional wrestling ==
In professional wrestling, some wrestlers use the soccer kick is as a finishing move. A number of professional wrestlers prior to the 1980s professional wrestling boom were taught to use wrestling moves and strikes legitimately. This was due to the likelihood of attacks on the wrestlers from fans. This included the soccer kick, which pro-wrestler CM Punk stated was the easiest tactic to use when a fan tried to get in the ring to confront a wrestler. High-profile users of soccer kicks as a finishing move includes Katsuyori Shibata, and Randy Orton. In Japan within a 1977 puroresu match between Antonio Inoki and Great Antonio, Inoki started to shoot on Great Antonio after Great Antonio refused to sell Inoki's offence. Inoki used a takedown on Great Antonio and then used soccer kicks and head stomps to legitimately knock out Great Antonio.

== In video games ==
In the 2010 video game, EA Sports MMA, soccer kicks were included in the game. In the 2012 video game UFC Undisputed 3, soccer kicks are included in the game in the Pride mode. This mode was intended to replicate Pride Fighting Championships. This was different compared with the normal UFC mode which does not include soccer kicks due to UFC following the Unified Rules.

The soccer kick has also been used in professional wrestling video games. It was used in the 1999 Nintendo 64 game, WWF WrestleMania 2000.

== See also ==
- Stomp (strike)
