= Eduardo Fraga =

Brazilian martial artist

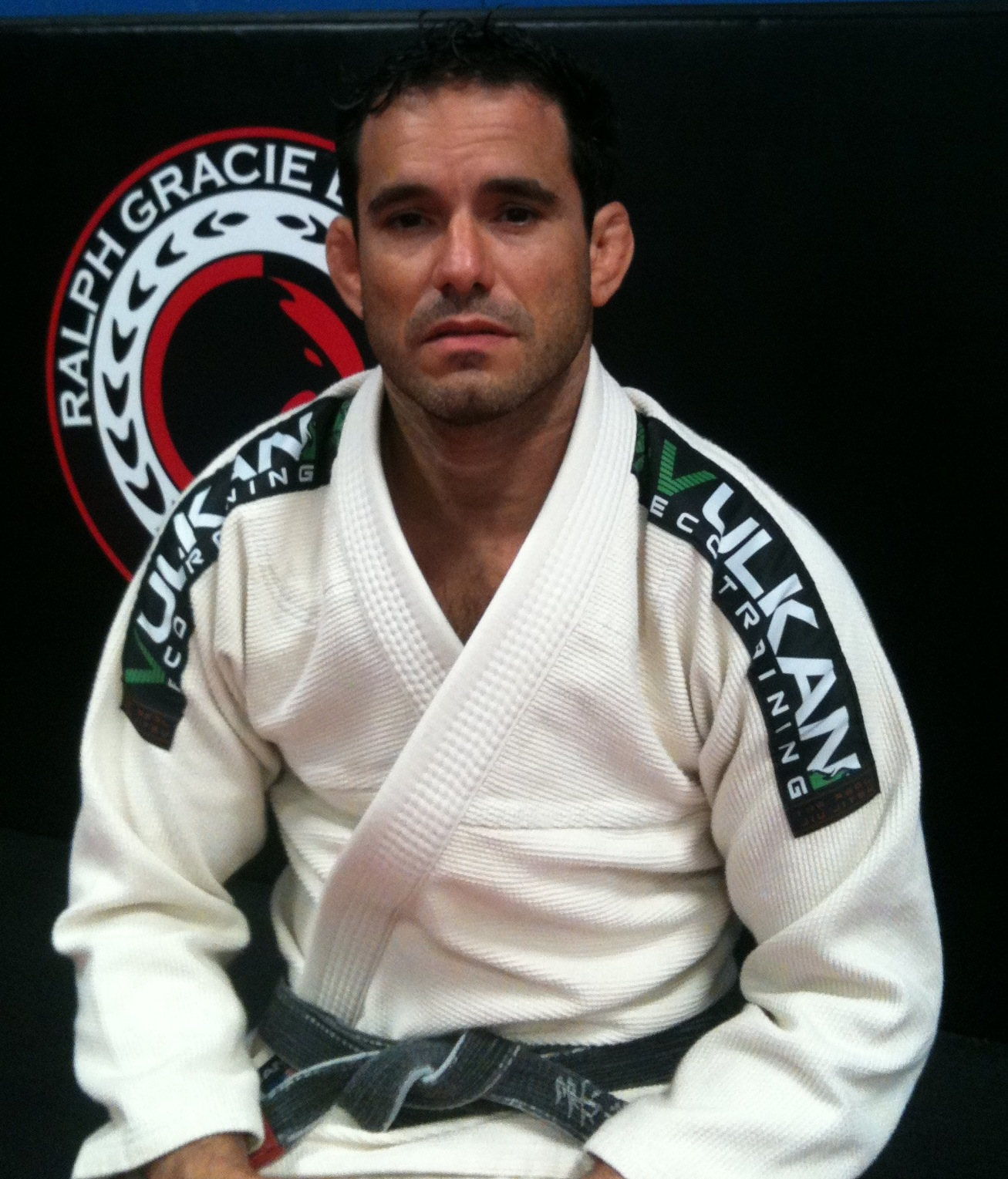
- Born: November 20, 1973; São Paulo, Brazil
- Height: 5 ft 7 in (1.70 m)
- Weight: 168 lb (76 kg; 12.0 st)
- Division: lightweight
- Team: Ralph Gracie Berkeley
- Rank: 6th degree Black Belt in Brazilian Jiu-Jitsu

Mixed martial arts record
- Total: 10
- Wins: 7
- By knockout: 0
- By submission: 6
- By decision: 1
- Losses: 3
- By knockout: 0
- By submission: 1
- By decision: 2
- Draws: 0

Other information
- Mixed martial arts record from Sherdog

Luís Eduardo 'Selvagem' Fraga (November 20, 1973) is a Brazilian martial artist with a 6th degree black belt in Brazilian Jiu-Jitsu. Eduardo Fraga is an instructor of Brazilian Jiu-Jitsu. Professor Fraga is known for his dynamic teaching style with a focus on strength, conditioning, and the students' technique. He began his training at the age of 6, under Roberto Lage of São Paulo, Brazil. Professor Lage awarded Eduardo Fraga his black belt at the age of 22. Eduardo trained in São Paulo, Brazil under Ryan Gracie. In Brazil, Eduardo Fraga competed in the MMA Vale Tudo tournaments from 1995 to 1997.

== Career ==
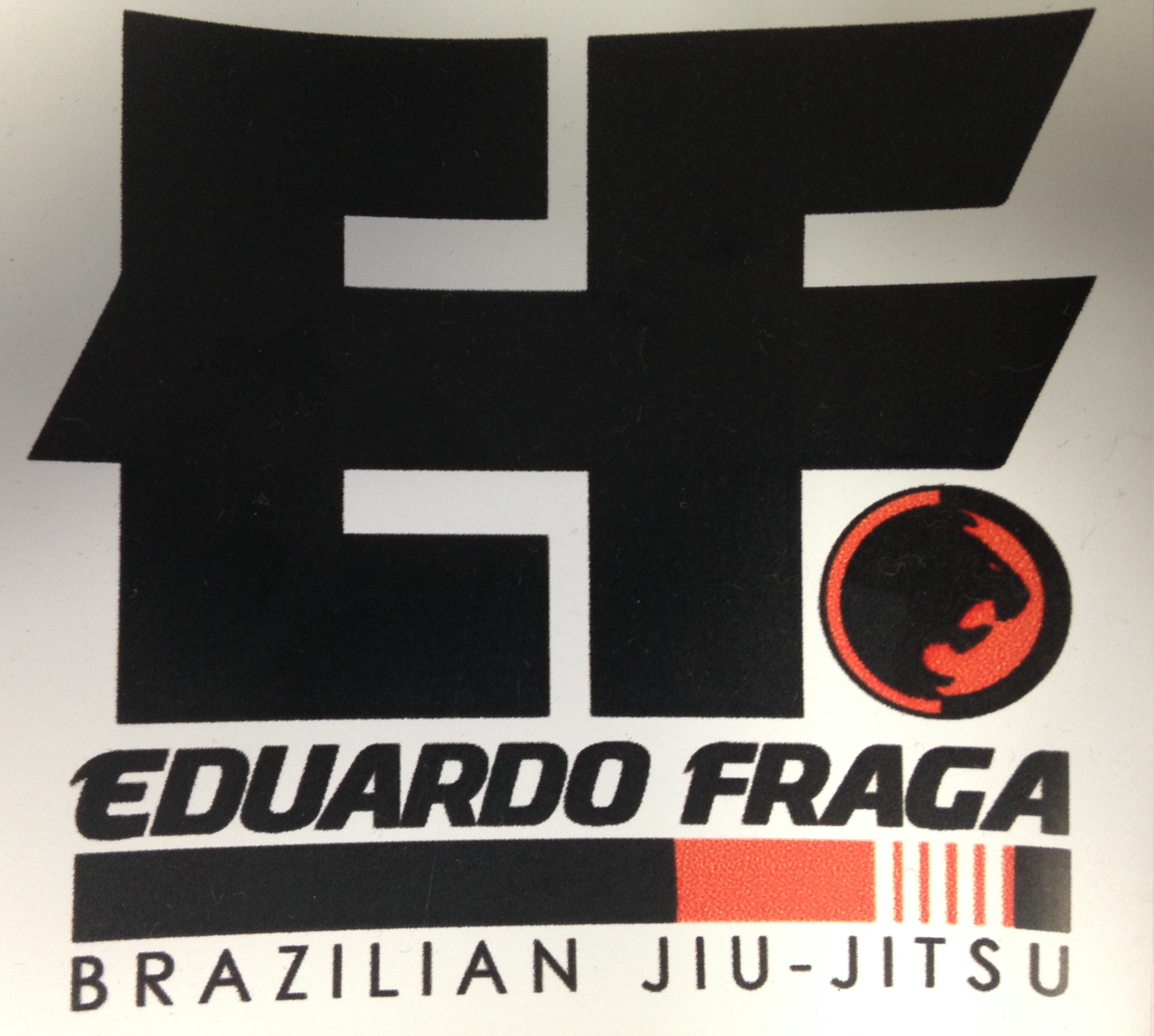

Eduardo has been training Gracie Jiu Jitsu for over forty years and teaching Gracie Jiu Jitsu to both children and adults for more than 30 years. Eduardo also teaches no-gi and mixed martial arts classes. Before relocating to Berkeley, California in 2008, Eduardo taught jiu-jitsu in Brazil for more than 20 years. He is currently the head instructor at Ralph Gracie Academy in Berkeley, California.

Eduardo Fraga, who is currently sponsored by Artisana, and TFM [ is also a very accomplished competitor and has regularly competed in Pan-American and International tournaments. Eduardo Fraga holds the titles of: 7-Time Brazilian State Champion (1992, 1993, 1994, 1996, 2000, 2001, 2003); 3rd place 2000 Pan-American Tournament; 2nd place 2003 Pan-American Tournament; 3rd place 2004 Pan-American Tournament; 3rd place 2004 Master and Senior International Tournament; 1st place 2005 Pan-American Tournament; 3rd place 2005 Pan-American Tournament Open-Division; 2nd place 2008 Pan-American Tournament; 2nd place 2009 U.S. Open Championship; 2nd place 2010 Pan-American Tournament; 3rd place 2011 Pan-American Master 2 Black belt; 1st place First Free Style Fight Circuit 1995; 2nd place Second Free Style Fight Circuit 1995; 2nd place Seventh Free Style Fight Circuit 1996. At the 2010 USOPEN, Eduardo won the gold medal at Masters and Absolute and Middle. In 2011, Eduardo Fraga won a silver medal in his weight division and in the absolute at the 2011 American Nationals and a gold medal at the 2011 US OPEN in San Jose, CA. Eduardo placed gold in both his weight class and in the open division at the 2012 Annual All Star Tournament in San Jose, California. In 2014, he placed first place at the IBJJF Pan-Am tournament at Master3 medium and third place in Open; first place at the IBJJF Long Beach International Open at Master3 and third place in open. Most recently, Eduardo Fraga took first place at the 2015 IBJJF San Francisco International Open at medium and second place in open, first place at the 2015 Las Vegas International Open at medium, and second place at the Pan-American Championship. In 2022 Eduardo returned to the competition. 3rd place at the 2022 European; 1st place at the Los Angeles international open; 3rd place at the 2022 Pan American Jiu Jitsu Master 4. Eduardo received the title of 5th degree black belt in 2015 by Ralph Gracie and received his 6th degree on November 20, 2019 also by Ralph Gracie at the Ralph Gracie Berkeley academy.

== Personal life ==
Eduardo Fraga currently lives in Berkeley, California.

== Mixed martial arts record ==
Professional record breakdown
10 matches	7 wins	3 losses
By knockout	0	0
By submission	6	1
By decision	1	2
Draws	0	
No contests	0	

Res.	Record	Opponent	Method	Event	Date	Round	Time	Location	Notes
Loss	7-3	(United States) Mark Hall	Submission (punches)	IVC 2 - A Question of Pride	September 15, 1997	1	9:19		
Loss	7-2	(Brazil) Johil de Oliveira	Decision	BVF 2 - Brazilian Vale Tudo Fighting 2	May 31, 1996	2	10:00		
Win	7-1	(Brazil) Alexandre Lima	Submission (rear naked choke)	BVF 2 - Brazilian Vale Tudo Fighting 2	May 31, 1996	1	00:49		
Win	6-1	(Brazil) Antonio Zeferian	Submission (position)	BVF 2 - Brazilian Vale Tudo Fighting 2	May 31, 1996	1	0:42		
Loss	5-1	(Brazil) Wander Braga	Decision (unanimous)	CDL - Circuito de Lutas 2	July 5, 1995	2	5:00		
Win	5-0	(Brazil) Marcelo Romano	Submission (rear-naked choke)	CDL - Circuito de Lutas 2	July 5, 1995	1	1:42		
Win	4-0	(Brazil) Marcos Vieira	Submission (rear-naked choke)	CDL - Circuito de Lutas 2	July 5, 1995	1	2:55		
Win	3-0	(Brazil) Leandro Heck Gembo	Decision (unanimous)	CDL - Circuito de Lutas 1	April 1, 1995	1	13:00		
Win	2-0	(Brazil) Marcos Vieira	Technical Submission (armbar)	CDL - Circuito de Lutas 1	April 1, 1995	1	00:56		
Win	1-0	(Brazil) Alvaro Pereira	Submission (armbar)	CDL - Circuito de Lutas 1	April 1, 1995	1	1:28		
