= Georges Mehdi =

Brazilian judoka

- Born: January 1, 1934; Cannes, France
- Died: November 6, 2018 (aged 84); Rio de Janeiro, Brazil
- Other names: Kastriget Mehdi, Robert Mehdi
- Nationality: Algerian
- Style: Judo
- Teacher: Yasuichi Matsumoto
- Rank: 9th degree red belt in Judo Kodokan certified

Other information
- Notable students: Rickson Gracie, Brian Pereira (USA Medalist), John Pereira (Glover Texeira's first USA MMA Coach), Flavio Papelbaum, Edson Carvalho (1992 Brazil Champion), Ignacio Cristovao, Wallid Ismail

Kastriot "Georges" Mehdi (1934 – November 6, 2018) was a French-born Brazilian judoka, considered one of the most prominent practitioners of judo in Brazil.

== Biography ==
=== Early career ===
An Albanian, native born in [Saint Étienne[ France]], George originally came to Brazil on a vacation in 1950 and did not return. A trained judoka, he went to the jiu-jitsu school of Carlos Gracie, but left it after some time due to differences with the Gracie family. According to him, they taught very little throwing claiming that it was less useful than groundfighting, while Mehdi believed that they did so because they did not know how to throw. He also was uncomfortable with which he perceived as lack of honesty by the family, as they had been publicizing him as a French judo champion despite he was just a beginner. He then traveled to Japan to train in the Kodokan school in 1952.

According to fellow Gracie student Armando Wriedt, Mehdi was fired for being "lazy and undisciplined". In one instance, he would have almost thrown a student off a staircase during a challenge. In another point of friction, Carlson Gracie injured him while training. Additionally, Mehdi would have moved to Japan, by suggestion of Mestre Sinhozinho's former student Rudolf Hermanny, in order to escape the death threat of several policemen he had a brawl with.

Learning under all Japan champion and Kyuzo Mifune trainee Yasuichi Matsumoto, Mehdi trained for five years at the Tenri University in Nara, meeting names like world middleweight champion Isao Okano and the great Masahiko Kimura. He actually had already met Matsumoto in Brazil, where Yasuichi had seen him do judo while on a tour of the world. He provided Mehdi with tuition room and board and spending money for 5 years. Additionally Mehdi trained at the Kodokan and Chuo University. The training in Japan only lasted 6 months as George went to attend his sick mother. Georges spent a total of 10 years in Japan and taught Judo in a high school in Japan, probably the first non Japanese to do so. When he died Mehdi was a 9th dan in Judo.

=== Competition ===
Mehdi was referred to as the best judoka in Brazil, whom the Gracie family refused to face in judo competition. This was in 1942 after the loss of George Gracie to Euclydes Hatem, fearing that it might have a bad effect on their growing reputation.

In 1951, Mehdi was a witness to the Masahiko Kimura vs. Hélio Gracie fight and Helio's subsequent hospitalization, He stated that, unlike what the Gracie side claimed, Kimura was no giant, but about 5'6 and 185 lbs. Additionally he believed the fight was worked or choreographed to a point, with Kimura intentionally allowing Hélio to fight for minutes before finishing him.

In 1968, according to Wriedt, Mehdi trained with fellow Gracie student Pedro Hemetério, nicknamed "Okra Man" for his victory over the Judoka Akio Yoshihara. Georges would have capitalized in his superior conditioning at the time to hold him down and not letting him out, claiming to win by judo rules. Several Gracie students tried to assault his academy, but they were stopped by Rudolf Hermanny and two armed bodyguards that trained under Mehdi. Hemetério and the Gracies later challenged Mehdi to a fight, but he did not accept the challenge, stating in a newspaper that, "I don't want to fight Hemetério, because a Judoka is not on equal terms with a Jiu-jitsu fighter. While one is a sport, the other is a real fight." Wriedt recalls Hélio Gracie pressed Mehdi into making the claim.

He was the Brazilian judo champion for seven years straight. He competed in the 5th world championships. At the age of 32 he was already a 4th dan in Judo. He received a silver medal and a bronze medal in the Pan American games in 1963 and 1967 respectively.

== Teaching career ==
He trained numerous individuals including Henrique Machado. George's students included Mario Sperry, Rickson Gracie, multiple USA National Medalist Brian Pereira, and Sylvio Behring. Judo champion Isao Okano said of Mehdi that "if you took all the knowledge of all the instructors in this hall [the Olympics], it would not equal the knowledge of Sensei Mehdi".

He was fluent in French, English, Japanese, and Portuguese.

== Death ==
Sensei Mehdi died November 6, 2018, in Rio de Janeiro, Brazil, aged 84.
