= International Vale Tudo Championship =

MMA fighting promotion based in Brazil

- Type: Private
- Industry: Mixed martial arts promotion
- Founded: São Paulo, Brazil (1997)
- Founder: Sergio Batarelli
- Fate: Hiatus
- Headquarters: São Paulo, Brazil
- Key people: Sérgio Batarelli, Stephane Cabrera, Miquel Iturrate, Koichi Kawasaki, Stephen Quadros
- Owner: Batarelli Fighting Promotions
- Website: valetudo.com.br/ivcmenu.htm

The International Vale Tudo Championship (IVC) was a Vale Tudo and mixed martial arts (MMA) fighting promotion based in Brazil starting in 1997. The IVC was a fundamentally important platform in the promotion of Brazilian MMA in the late 1990s and early 2000s.

== History ==
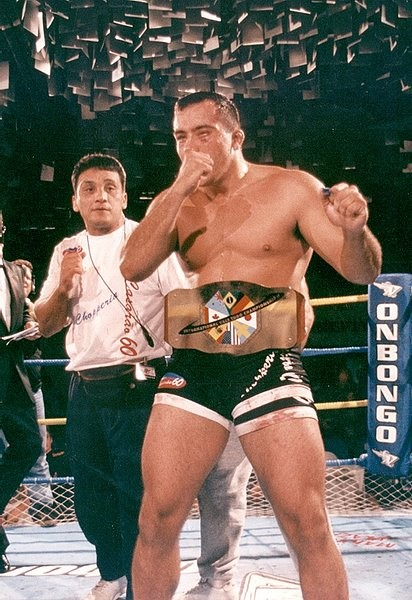
Artur Mariano wins the Cruiserweight belt after defeating Wanderlei Silva with a doctor stoppage at IVC 2.

The IVC was established in 1997 by Sérgio Batarelli after a disagreement between him and Frederico Lapenda, with whom he had been co-promoter of the World Vale Tudo Championship (WVC). Batarelli was a former kickboxing world champion and had Vale Tudo experience with a bout against Casimiro "Rei Zulu" de Nascimento Martins in 1984 before he decided to become involved in the business side of the nascent sport. He helped arrange UFC Brazil in 1998 and would become manager of multiple Brazilian MMA and K-1 fighters. The IVC revealed many future stars of MMA such as Wanderlei Silva, José "Pelé" Landi-Jons, Renato Sobral, Johil de Oliveira, Artur Mariano, Ebenezer Fontes Braga, Branden Lee Hinkle, Carlos Barreto, Wallid Ismail, among others, and also hosted recognized foreign fighters such as Chuck Liddell and Gary Goodridge.

The first events were no holds barred contests inspired by the Ultimate Fighting Championship and gained an international reputation for their hardcore nature. The IVC became one of the most important Vale Tudo tournaments in Brazil during its existence, and became a popular, globally recognized promotion just after the UFC and PRIDE Fighting Championships. While the UFC fights were held in an octagon, the IVC kept the traditional boxing ring shape with the addition of a net connecting the bottom rope to the ring canvas to prevent fighters from falling out of the ring. An IVC fight lasted a maximum of 30 minutes. It was not uncommon for IVC fighters to suffer injuries such as broken bones, lost teeth, or deep cuts. As a part of the 'hardcore' nature of the promotion, head butts and groin strikes were allowed. Head butts render fighters on the bottom in the guard position more vulnerable. In a memorable fight in the first edition, Gary Goodridge stuck his feet inside Pedro Otávio's trunks and proceeded to crush his testicles, after they stood up, Goodridge kept trying to put his hands inside Pedro's trunks and keep smashing his testicles. Putting hands or feet inside the opponents shorts became illegal by the second event. Matches often reached a finish via knockout or TKO (Technical Knockout) with an IVC event in 1999 concluding with 8 out of 10 matches finishing via strikes.

In 2003 the state of São Paulo (where the promotion was based) prohibited the sanctioning of the Vale Tudo, causing the promotion to enter an hiatus period after 16 events.

=== Brief return and WKN partnership ===
In January 2011, during an interview with channel Combate, founder Sergio Batarelli announced the return of the IVC in mid-2012 with a new ruleset based on the Unified Rules of Mixed Martial Arts, and announced that the promotion would act as a feeder promotion to the UFC from then on. IVC returned with a mixed-style event at IVC 15 on Saturday, August 20, 2016, in Sorocaba, Sao Paulo, Brazil. The main event featured a match between Felipe Micheletti and Rogelio Ortiz for the World Kickboxing Network super cruiserweight world title. The event also included MMA and Kickboxing tournaments. After IVC 15, promotion events ceased and the organization has not held an event since.

== Events ==
The organization held 16 events, including 3 international events, starting with IVC 14 in Caracas, Venezuela, and two small events in 2002 and 2003 in the Federal Republic of Yugoslavia and Portugal respectively before being banned by the government of the state of São Paulo.

| Event | Date |
|---|---|
| IVC 1 - Real Fight Tournament | July 6, 1997 |
| IVC 2 - A Question of Pride | September 15, 1997 |
| IVC 3 - The War Continues | December 10, 1997 |
| IVC 4 - The Battle | February 7, 1998 |
| IVC 5 - The Warriors | April 26, 1998 |
| IVC 6 - The Challenge | August 23, 1998 |
| IVC 7 - The New Champions | August 23, 1998 |
| IVC 8 - The Road Back to the Top | January 20, 1999 |
| IVC 9 - The Revenge | January 20, 1999 |
| IVC 10 - World Class Champions | April 27, 1999 |
| IVC 11 - The Tournament is Back | April 27, 1999 |
| IVC 12 - The New Generation of Middleweights | August 26, 1999 |
| IVC 13 - The New Generation of Lightweights | August 26, 1999 |
| IVC 14 - USA vs. Brazil | November 11, 2001 |
| IVC - Rumble in Yugoslavia | December 1, 2002 |
| IVC - Starwars 1 | March 22, 2003 |
| IVC 15 - A New Era | August 20, 2016 |

== Rules ==
Sérgio Batarelli created the IVC in response to a belief that the rules the UFC was adding were diluting what he viewed as a "real fight" and to keep the tradition of the original Vale Tudo style going, as such, the IVC was a return to the early 'no-holds-barred' Vale Tudo style. Batarelli was the referee for all IVC matches that were held. A common urban myth was that the IVC was totally rules-free and it only had an "honor code", but there were indeed official rules set by Batarelli, for example, the ban on putting hands or feet in the opponents trunks was made after the Goodridge match at IVC 1.

=== General rules ===
- The maximum duration of each fight was 30 minutes with only one round
- Victory in a match was earned by Knockout, Technical Knockout, Submission or Decision.
- Any fouls performed would result in a disqualification

=== Fouls ===
- Biting
- Eye-gouging
- Fish-hooking
- Holding the ropes excessively
- Kicking while wearing shoes of any kind
- Grabbing the opponent's trunks (From IVC 2 onwards)

== Championships ==
=== Heavyweight championship ===
Weight limit: Unlimited

| No. | Name | Date | Location | Defenses |
|---|---|---|---|---|
| 1 | (Brazil) Carlos Barreto (def. Pedro Otavio) | April 27, 1999 (International Vale Tudo Championship 10) | Brazil | |

=== Cruiserweight championship ===
Weight limit: 90 kg (198.4 lb; 14.2 st)

| No. | Name | Date | Location | Defenses |
|---|---|---|---|---|
| 1 | (Brazil) Wanderlei Silva (def. Eugene Jackson) | April 27, 1999 (International Vale Tudo Championship 10) | Brazil | |

=== Middleweight Championship ===
Weight limit: 80 kg (176.4 lb; 12.6 st)

| No. | Name | Date | Location | Defenses |
|---|---|---|---|---|
| 1 | (Brazil) José Landi-Jons (def. Johil de Oliveira) | April 27, 1999 (International Vale Tudo Championship 11) | Brazil | |

=== Lightweight championship ===
Weight limit: 70 kg (154.3 lb; 11.0 st)

| No. | Name | Date | Location | Defenses |
|---|---|---|---|---|
| 1 | (Brazil) Rafael Cordeiro (def. Henry Matamoros) | January 20, 1999 (International Vale Tudo Championship 9) | Brazil | |

=== Superfight championship ===
No weight restrictions

| No. | Name | Date | Location | Defenses |
|---|---|---|---|---|
| 1 | (Brazil) Carlos Barreto (def. Gary Myers) | August 26, 1999 (International Vale Tudo Championship 12) | Sao Paulo, Brazil | |
| 2 | (Brazil) Flavio Luiz Moura (def. Milton Bahia) | August 26, 1999 (International Vale Tudo Championship 13) | Sao Paulo, Brazil | |
