= Zuluzinho =

Brazilian mixed martial artist

- Born: Wágner da Conceição Martins; May 19, 1978 (age 48); São Luís, Maranhão, Brazil
- Height: 2.01 m (6 ft 7 in)
- Weight: 390 lb (177 kg; 27 st 12 lb)
- Division: Super Heavyweight
- Style: Vale Tudo, Brazilian Jiu-Jitsu
- Team: B-Tough
- Rank: Purple belt in Brazilian Jiu-Jitsu
- Years active: 2004–2010, 2018–present (MMA)

Mixed martial arts record
- Total: 24
- Wins: 12
- By knockout: 10
- By submission: 1
- By decision: 1
- Losses: 11
- By knockout: 8
- By submission: 2
- By decision: 1
- No contests: 1

Other information
- Mixed martial arts record from Sherdog

Wágner da Conceição Martins (born May 19, 1978), better known as Zuluzinho (Portuguese pronunciation: [zuluˈziɲu]), is a Brazilian vale tudo fighter and mixed martial artist. He is the son of Vale Tudo legend Casemiro Nascimento Martins ("Rei Zulu"). Wagner was raised by his grandmother and works as a security guard in a number of reggae clubs in northern Brazil. Following in his father's footsteps, he trained in both Brazilian jiu-jitsu and vale tudo. Zuluzinho holds a purple belt in Brazilian jiu-jitsu under black belt Ricardo "Ricardinho Bulldog" Candido Gomes, who also serves as his MMA coach.

== Record controversy ==
Zuluzinho reportedly compiled an undefeated Vale Tudo record of 38-0 (38 knockouts) in Brazil prior to his fight at Cage Warriors Strike Force 2 in England. However, all but five of those fights are unconfirmed. In the December 2005 issue of Full-Contact Fighter, Marcelo Alonso wrote that Zuluzinho started his MMA career in 2000 in the town of Teresina, near the city of Sao Luis, Brazil.

== Career highlights ==
Zuluzinho was beaten after only 26 seconds of the first round in PRIDE Fighting Championships Shockwave 2005 event at the hands of world champion Fedor Emelianenko.

In the Pride Open Weight Grand Prix on May 5, 2006, he was defeated via armbar in the first round by Antônio Rodrigo Nogueira.

His next fight was a loss against Eric Esch at PRIDE 34 by Submission (kimura).

On December 31, 2007, Zuluzinho scored the biggest win of his career by stopping Ikuhisa "The Punk" Minowa in 3 rounds at K-1 in Japan.

He saw his winning streak snapped when he lost by 1st-round TKO to Ibragim Magomedov at FightForce - Russia vs. The World on April 19, 2008.

On July 7, 2008, Zuluzinho was knocked out by fellow super heavyweight Guigao Guigao at DDG-Desafio de Gigantes 10. In the semi-final match, Zuluzinho's 63-year-old father, Rei Zulu, lost by a disqualification to Santos Samurai.

Zulu faced rising star Geronimo "Mondragon" dos Santos on December 14, 2008. In this bout he landed a flurry of strikes early in the first round but was unable to finish dos Santos, and subsequently was knocked out in round 2.

One year later he returned to action with a win against Brazilian Top Team veteran Angelo Araujo.

On Nov. 30, 2010, Zuluzinho lost in his second bout against Geronimo dos Santos via first-round KO at Mr. Cage 4.

On June 2, 2018, Zuluzinho lost to Edvaldo de Oliveira via TKO at Imortal FC 9.

On February 23, 2021, Zuluzinho faced undefeated Russian Yusup Shuaev at AMC Fight Nights: Sochi. Despite dropping his opponent at the very end of a round and celebrating prematurely his win, Zuluzinho would go on to lose the bout via majority decision.

== Mixed martial arts record ==
Professional record breakdown
25 matches	12 wins	12 losses
By knockout	10	9
By submission	1	2
By decision	1	1
No contests	1	

Res.	Record	Opponent	Method	Event	Date	Round	Time	Location	Notes
Loss	12–12 (1)	Serigne Ousmane Dia	TKO (punches)	MMA Attack 4: #Comback	September 24, 2022	1	0:42	Będzin, Poland	
Loss	12–11 (1)	Petr Romankevich	KO (knee)	AMC Fight Nights 114	September 3, 2022	1	4:53	Minsk, Belarus	
Loss	12–10 (1)	Yusup Shuaev	Decision (majority)	AMC Fight Nights: Sochi	February 23, 2021	3	5:00	Sochi, Russia	
Win	12–9 (1)	Aleksandar Aleksic	TKO (punches)	Megdan Fighting 6	December 9, 2019	1	3:18	Belgrade, Serbia	
Win	11–9 (1)	Marko Djordevic	TKO (punches)	Megdan Fighting 5	June 27, 2019	1	0:53	Sremska Mitrovica, Serbia	
Win	10–9 (1)	Aleksandar Aleksic	TKO (punches)	Megdan Fighting 4	March 15, 2019	1	0:23	Novi Sad, Serbia	
Loss	9–9 (1)	Edvaldo de Oliveira	TKO (retirement)	Imortal FC 9	June 2, 2018	1	5:00	Sao Luis, Brazil	
Loss	9–8 (1)	Geronimo dos Santos	KO (punches)	Mr. Cage 4	November 30, 2010	1	N/A	Manaus, Brazil	
Win	9–7 (1)	Douglas Humberto	Decision (split)	Ilha Combat 3: Confrontation of Giants	April 9, 2010	3	5:00	Sao Luis, Brazil	
Win	8–7 (1)	Angelo Araujo	TKO (retirement)	Ilha Combat 2: Araujo vs. Zuluzinho	December 19, 2009	2	5:00	Sao Luis, Brazil	
Loss	7–7 (1)	Geronimo dos Santos	KO (punch)	Fusion Combat	December 14, 2008	2	0:22	Boa Vista, Brazil	
Loss	7–6 (1)	Guilherme dos Anjos	TKO (submission to punches)	Desafio de Gigantes 10	July 6, 2008	1	3:52	Macapa, Brazil	
Loss	7–5 (1)	Ibragim Magomedov	TKO (punches)	fightFORCE: Russia vs. The World	April 19, 2008	1	N/A	St. Petersburg, Russia	
Win	7–4 (1)	Ikuhisa Minowa	TKO (corner stoppage)	K-1 Premium 2007 Dynamite!!	December 31, 2007	3	2:13	Osaka, Japan	
Win	6–4 (1)	Vladimir Kuchenko	Submission (rear-naked choke)	Bodog Fight: USA vs. Russia	November 30, 2007	1	2:14	Moscow, Russia	
Loss	5–4 (1)	Guilherme dos Anjos	TKO (retirement)	Desafio de Gigantes 8	November 1, 2007	2	3:50	Macapa, Brazil	
Loss	5–3 (1)	Butterbean	Submission (americana)	PRIDE 34	April 8, 2007	1	2:35	Saitama, Japan	
Loss	5–2 (1)	Antônio Rodrigo Nogueira	Submission (armbar)	Pride FC - Total Elimination Absolute	May 5, 2006	1	2:17	Osaka, Japan	2006 Pride Heavyweight Grand Prix Opening Round.
Loss	5–1 (1)	Fedor Emelianenko	TKO (submission to punches)	Pride FC: Shockwave 2005	December 31, 2005	1	0:26	Saitama, Japan	
Win	5–0 (1)	Henry Miller	TKO (knees)	Pride 30: Fully Loaded	October 23, 2005	1	1:31	Saitama, Japan	
Win	4–0 (1)	Rafal Dabrowski	KO (punch)	CWFC: Strike Force 2	July 16, 2005	2	2:04	Coventry, England	
NC	3–0 (1)	Kleber Ranieri Jansen	NC (both fighters fell from ring)	Desafio de Gigantes 4	May 20, 2005	1	N/A	Macapa, Brazil	
Win	3–0	Fabio Black	KO (strikes)	World Combat 3	May 13, 2005	1	1:20	Sao Luis, Brazil	
Win	2–0	Luiz Pantera	KO (punch)	Pedreiras Combat Vale Tudo	May 6, 2005	1	0:21	Pedreiras, Brazil	
Win	1–0	Junior Eladio	TKO (punches)	Desafio de Gigantes 2	March 13, 2004	1	0:37	Macapa, Brazil	
