= Vale Tudo =

Brazilian unarmed, full-contact combat sport

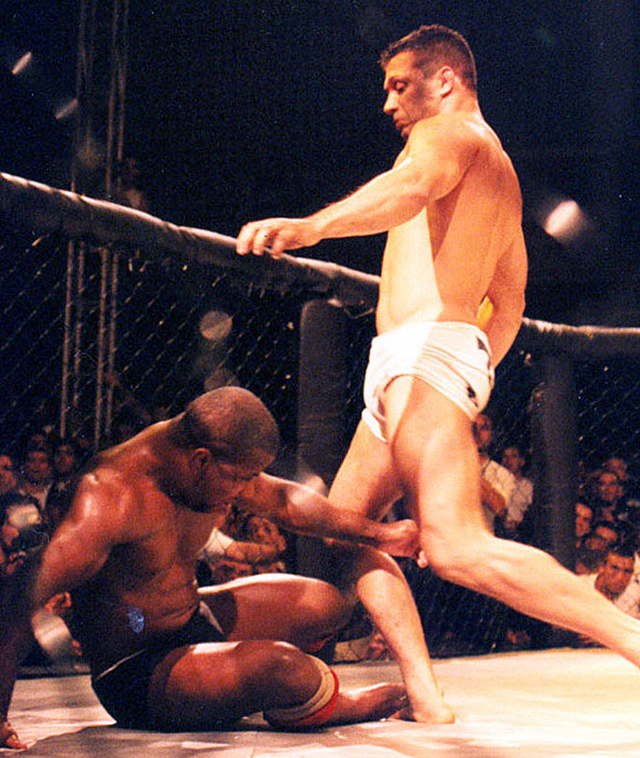
- Renzo Gracie does a soccer kick (tiro de meta) on Eugenio Tadeu at the Pentagon Combat event in Rio de Janeiro, 1997
- Also known as: No Holds Barred (NHB); Mixfight; Free fight
- Focus: Hybrid: Striking (Boxing, Thai Boxing); Grappling (Jiu-Jitsu, Luta Livre)
- Hardness: Full contact
- Country of origin: Brazil
- Famous practitioners: Hélio Gracie; Carlos Gracie; Valdemar Santana; Euclydes Hatem; João Alberto Barreto; Carlson Gracie; Rei Zulu; Rickson Gracie; Eugenio Tadeu; Marco Ruas; Wallid Ismail; Rafael Cordeiro; Carlos Barreto; Wanderlei Silva; James McBeath; Johil de Oliveira
- Parenthood: Boxing, Judo, Brazilian jiu-jitsu, Muay Thai, Catch wrestling, Combat Sambo, Luta livre
- Descendant arts: Mixed Martial Arts (MMA)
- Olympic sport: No

Vale Tudo or vale-tudo (Portuguese pronunciation: [ˈvali ˈtudu]; English: "anything goes", "everything allowed"), also known as No Holds Barred (NHB) in the United States, is an unarmed, full-contact fighting style or competition format characterized by having very few rules. Popular in Brazil during the 20th century, it eventually evolved into modern mixed martial arts (MMA). "Vale Tudo" was long used as a synonym for MMA in Brazil, but fell into disuse with the emergence of stricter rules and media influence for a more "civilized" name; the term now refers to an early, more rules-free stage of the modern sport.

Vale Tudo initially started as an informal ruleset for fighters from different martial arts to fight each other. The Gracie family was known to organize their famous "Gracie Challenge", in which they would fight other martial artists in Vale Tudo bouts to prove the efficiency and superiority of their own Gracie jiu-jitsu. Many fighters eventually started to train specifically for Vale Tudo events, mixing striking and grappling, eventually advertising "Vale Tudo" as its own standalone style. For example, Marco Ruas referred to his hybrid style of Luta Livre and Muay Thai striking simply as "Vale Tudo".

== History ==
=== Early 20th century–1980s ===
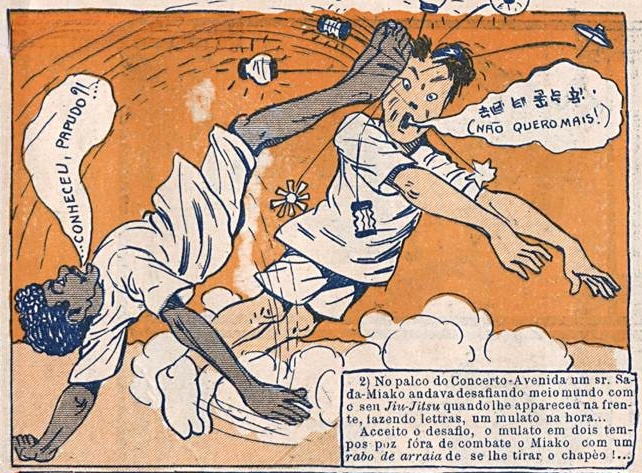
Panel by Alfredo Storni featuring capoeirista Ciríaco defeating jujitsu fighter Sada Miyako with a rabo de arraia kick, O Malho, 1909.

Public fighting exhibitions and intermodality contests involving different fighting styles were held in Brazilian circuses and theaters during the early 20th century. These events formed part of a broader international tradition of combat-sport exhibitions and challenge matches associated with circuses, fairs, and theaters, which also included boxing and wrestling (in particular, catch-as-catch-can, a precursor of professional wrestling). In Brazil, Japanese immigrants practitioners of "jiu-jitsu", a term that at the time was often used broadly for Japanese grappling arts, in particular Kodokan Judo, incorporated demonstrations and challenge matches into their public performances, sometimes facing practitioners of other fighting styles.

In 1908, Japanese jiu-jitsu practitioner associated with the Kodokan Sada Miyako arrived in Brazil aboard the Brazilian Navy training ship Benjamin Constant, together with another Japanese practitioner, M. Kakiora. He was subsequently employed by the Brazilian Navy to teach jiu-jitsu to its officers. In 1909, as part of public demonstrations intended to showcase the effectiveness of jiu-jitsu, Miyako began publicly challenging practitioners of other fighting styles and offering prizes to anyone who could defeat him. Among those who accepted his challenges was the Portuguese wrestler Arnaldo José Ferreira, who had previously defeated the Japanese wrestler Raku in Lisbon. Another was capoeirista Francisco da Silva Ciríaco defeated Japanese jiu-jitsu fighter Sada Miyako in one of the earliest documented confrontations of this kind in Brazil. Examples of such bouts were described in the Japanese-American Courier on October 4, 1928:

One report from Brasil declares that Jiu Jitsu is truly an art and that in an interesting exhibition in the side tent to the big circus a Bahian of monstrous dimensions met his waterloo at the hands of a diminutive Japanese wrestler. The man was an expert at Capoeira, an old South American style of fighting, but after putting the Japanese on his back and trying to kick his head ... the little oriental by the use of a Jiu Jitsu hold threw the Bahian and after a short struggle he was found sitting on the silent frame of the massive opponent.

In 1914, Mitsuyo Maeda, also known as Conde Koma, a Japanese judoka trained at the Kodokan, arrived in Brazil with a group of Japanese martial artists. Before coming to Brazil, Maeda had already gained international experience through challenge matches and contests against practitioners of different fighting styles, including professional wrestling, particularly catch-as-catch-can wrestling (at the time, professional wrestling generally referred to competitive grappling prizefighting rather than the scripted entertainment form associated with the term today). Like Miyako, Maeda and his companions incorporated demonstrations and challenge matches into their public performances. In Rio de Janeiro, the group performed at theaters and other entertainment venues, where they demonstrated techniques, fought among themselves, and occasionally challenged members of the audience. Maeda later settled in Belém, Pará, where he taught what was then commonly called jiu-jitsu to Carlos Gracie and other students.

However, the term "Vale Tudo" did not enter popular use until 1959–1960, when it was used to describe the style-versus-style bouts featured in a Rio television show called Heróis do Ringue ("Heroes of the Ring"). The matchmakers and hosts of the show included members of the Gracie family, including Carlson Gracie and Carley Gracie. The participants were all legitimate practitioners of their styles. The Gracie family, which had origins in the circus business, devised the "Gracie Challenge", where they would invite or be challenged by opponents from other martial arts to a Vale Tudo match to prove the effectiveness of their Gracie Jiu-Jitsu. The Gracies would hold their challenges behind closed doors at their gyms, but in some cases they also held public events.

Euclydes Hatem, known as Mestre Tatu, was the creator of Luta Livre, a Brazilian submission wrestling, variant of catch wrestling. In 1942, he defeated George Gracie in a historic match. Years later, in 1968, one of his students, Euclides Pereira, also defeated Carlson Gracie.

One night during the show, João Alberto Barreto (later a referee for UFC 1) was competing against a man trained in Luta Livre. Barreto caught his opponent in an armbar and the man refused to submit. Barreto broke the man's arm. Consequently, the show was canceled and soon replaced by a professional wrestling show called Telecatch.

From 1960 onwards, Vale Tudo remained mostly an underground subculture, with most fights taking place in martial arts dojos or small gymnasiums. The Vale Tudo subculture was based in Rio de Janeiro, but many fights took place in the northern region, the southern region and the Bahia state, where Capoeira is prevalent. The scene in Rio de Janeiro focused mainly on the intense rivalry between Brazilian Jiu-Jitsu and Luta Livre. Fights in the other regions featured more diverse martial arts competing in the events.

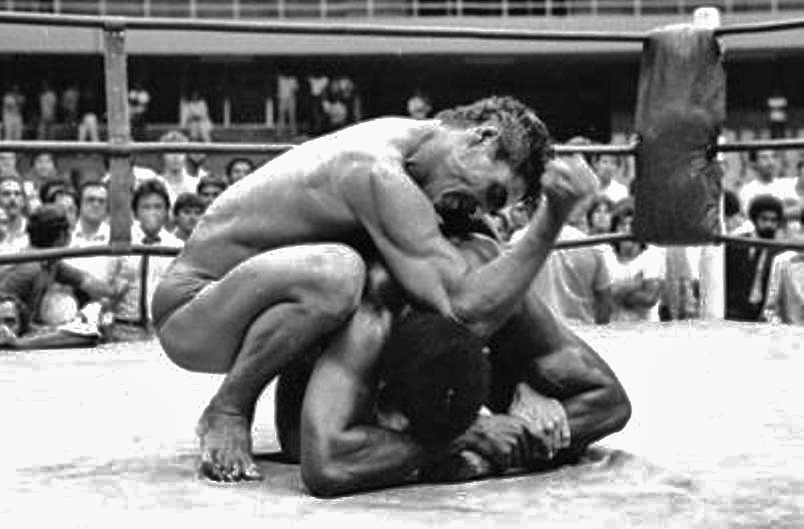
Rickson Gracie (top) does rabbit punches on Rei Zulu's head while he's on turtle position, 1980

In 1980 and 1984 Rickson Gracie fought two events against Casimiro de Nascimento Martins ("Rei Zulu"), father of Zuluzinho. Both events were preceded with public interest and they filled the Maracanãzinho stadium in Rio de Janeiro. They brought public media attention back to Vale Tudo, which had been dormant since the 1960s. This was made possible by Robson Gracie's ascension into the Presidency of the Sports Superintendence of the State of Rio de Janeiro in 1980, appointed by Leonel Brizola, whom Robson had a friendship as a bodyguard.

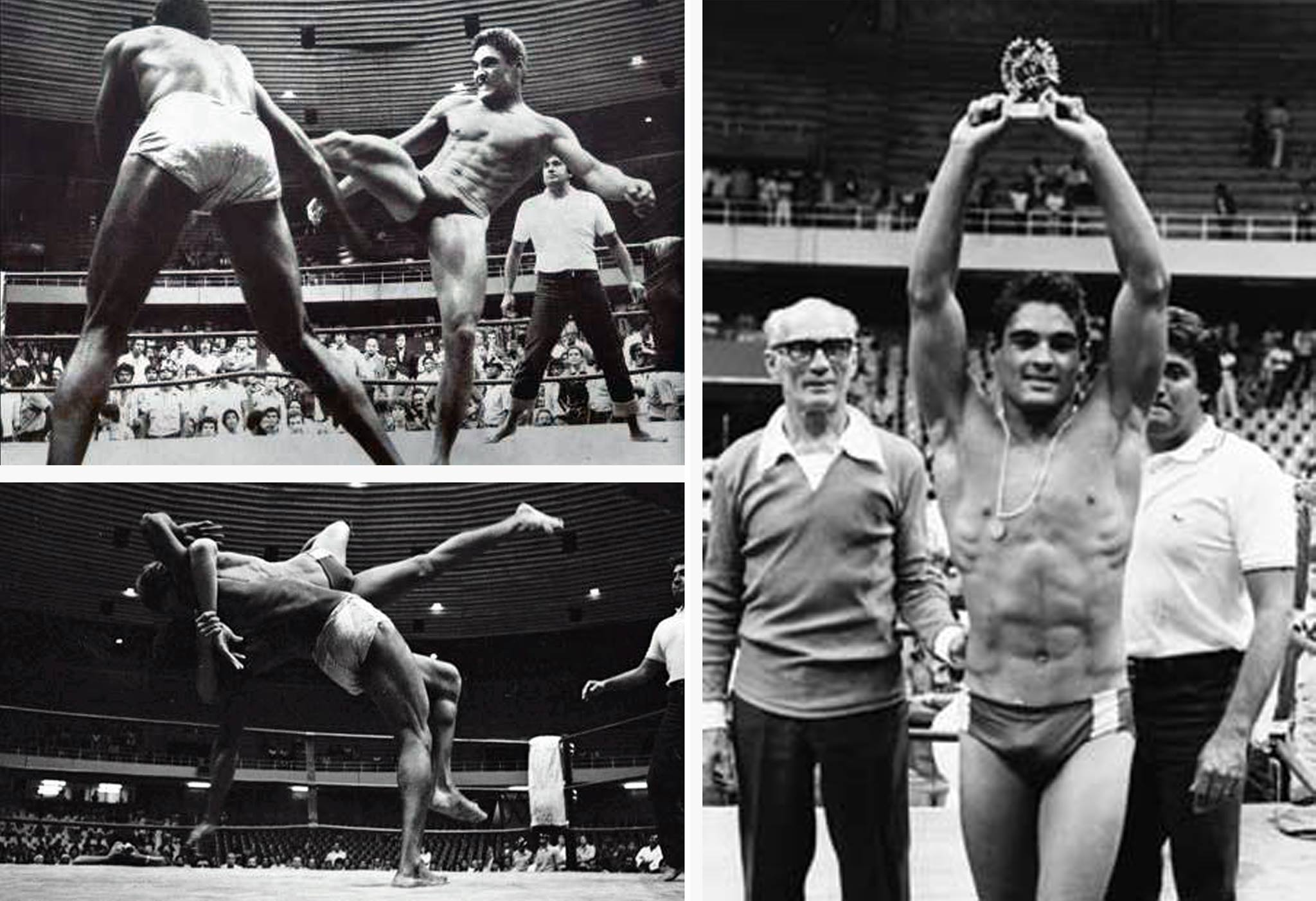
Rickson Gracie vs Rei Zulu

In 1984 at the Maracanãzinho it was held the Noite das Artes Marciais ("Night of the Martial Arts") also known as Jiu-jitsu vs Artes Marciais ("Jiu-Jitsu vs Martial Arts"), fought by representatives of BJJ against representatives of Muay Thai, Kung Fu, Kickboxing and Luta Livre. Future UFC 7 champion Marco Ruas participated, with a draw against BJJ representative Fernando Pinduka. There was also a match between Rei Zulu versus Kickboxing world champion, and future promoter of the International Vale Tudo Championship and manager of multiple Brazilians in MMA and K-1, Sérgio Batarelli. And in 1991 the most famous event happened: Desafio - Jiu Jitsu vs Luta Livre between representatives of both martial arts. The event was organized after BJJ practitioners almost got into a brawl with Luta Livre fighters, after they invaded a BJJ tournament in order to fight Wallid Ismail, as he had issued an insult and a challenge at a local newspaper against Luta Livre. The Luta Livre fighters were convinced to stand down and instead fight in a public challenge. Robson Gracie, organizer of the event, convinced TV Globo, Brazil's largest network, to broadcast the event live under the assumption it was a pure grappling event, the rules were later changed to Vale Tudo but Globo kept the program. The actual event would see 3 matches, all with victories by Jiu-Jitsu representatives. August 29, 1993—a few months before the first UFC event—also saw the event Capoeira vs Chute Boxe in Curitiba, fought between capoeiristas against Thai boxers from the Chute Boxe Academy. It was the introduction of several future MMA fighters such as Rafael Cordeiro, Jose 'Pelé' Landi-Jons and Nilson de Castro, and was the first Vale Tudo/MMA event in Curitiba, a future MMA center.

=== 1993–2000s ===
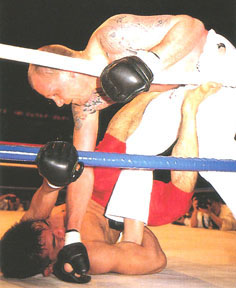
Shootist Yuki Nakai fights UFC 1 finalist Gerard Gordeau at Vale Tudo Japan 1995

In the 1970s, Rorion Gracie of the famous Gracie family emigrated to the United States and introduced Vale Tudo to a new market when he, together with American entrepreneur Art Davie, helped found the Ultimate Fighting Championship (UFC) in 1993. The event was advertised as a competition where fighters would each represent different martial arts in a single-elimination tournament without weight classes and no rules—although there were three rules: no biting, eye-gouging or fish-hooking. To pitch the event for TV executives, Gracie and Davie used the footage of the Gracie Challenges and Vale Tudo events in Brazil where the family had participated. The first event was named The Ultimate Fighting Championship (later retroactively renamed to UFC 1). Rorion's younger brother, Royce Gracie represented Gracie Jiu-Jitsu and won the event after submitting three opponents in succession. The event was a success and attracted some attention from the public and the media, and more editions were realized. The UFC also pioneered the "promotion" model for Vale Tudo/Mixed Martial arts, instead of promoters arranging one-off events like before.

Inspired by the format of the UFC, many new promotions of Vale Tudo were created. Some of the noteworthy promotions of this time in Brazil include Universal Vale Tudo Fighting, Brazilian Vale Tudo Fighting, Brazil Open, Super Challenge and Mo Team League. Besides the UFC, the United States also saw the introduction of Vale Tudo promotions similar to the UFC, such as the Battlecade Extreme Fighting and World Combat Championship in 1995. Vale Tudo would receive the name No Holds Barred (NHB) in the United States.

In Japan, former professional wrestler Satoru Sayama had created in 1985 a hybrid martial arts organization named Shooto, which featured striking with all limbs, takedowns, groundfighting and submissions. Impressed by the UFC, in 1994 he introduced Vale Tudo to Japan by organizing the Vale Tudo Japan tournament, which was more rules-free compared to previous Shooto rules. Rickson Gracie won the 1994 and 1995 editions of the tournament, making him famous in Japan. In 1997 PRIDE Fighting Championships was founded in order to match Rickson Gracie with popular Japanese shoot-style professional wrestler Nobuhiko Takada. The rules of PRIDE were modelled after the ones from Vale Tudo Japan with some modifications. The first event of the organization had an attendance of 47,000 fans and attracted the attention of Japanese mass media and soon PRIDE became one of the largest and most popular combat sports organization in the world, and it helped to popularize MMA.

In Europe, the influence of the UFC and Brazilian Vale Tudo contributed to the emergence of a related style of competition generally known as "mixfight" or "free fight". European events also drew heavily on Japanese shootfighting and Pancrase, particularly in the Netherlands, where a strong kickboxing scene provided a pool of experienced strikers. Promoters organized events combining kickboxing, wrestling, shootfighting, Pancrase and Vale Tudo under varying rulesets. The 1995 Cage Fight Tournament in Belgium was among the earliest European tournaments of this type, while Dutch events such as Free Fight Event and Mix Fight helped establish a local scene. In Russia and the former Soviet Union, similar competitions emerged under names such as “mixfight”, “absolute fighting”, and “fights without rules”. Russian promoter Vadim Finkelchtein became involved with the Dutch mixfight scene in 1995 and subsequently helped introduce the format to Russia. This development culminated in the establishment of the M-1 Global tournament series, whose first major tournament was held in Saint Petersburg in 1997. European and Russian mixfight thus developed at the intersection of Brazilian Vale Tudo, the international influence of the UFC, and Japanese shoot-style wrestling scene.

However, in the United States there was a backlash against the violent nature of the nascent sport. In 1996, Senator John McCain saw a tape of the first UFC events and immediately found it abhorrent. McCain himself led a campaign to ban the UFC, calling it "human cockfighting", thirty-six states followed his campaign, and the event was blacklisted from television. In response, the UFC started to implement more restrictive rules, weight categories and judges, eventually evolving into the Unified Rules of Mixed Martial Arts. The name "Mixed Martial Arts" was also devised at this time as they felt the term NHB was detrimental to the public image of the sport and better represented the new evolution of the sport after the introduction of the new rules.

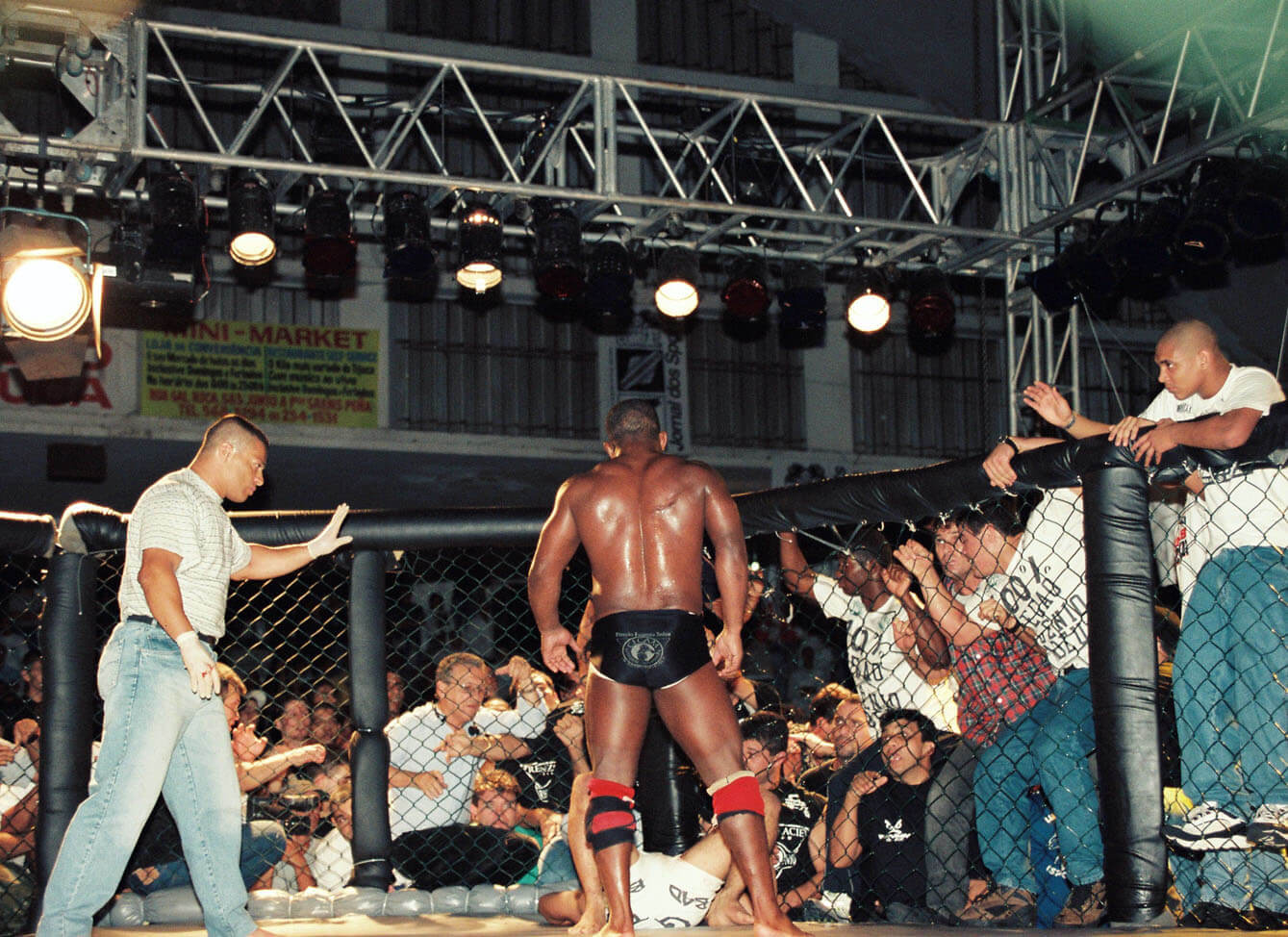
Eugenio Tadeu (standing, in black trunks) vs Renzo Gracie (on the ground, in white trunks) during the Pentagon Combat event before the event descended into a riot

In Brazil, Vale Tudo eventually met similar obstacles to those faced in the US. In 1997 there was the creation of a major event named "Pentagon Combat", with a pentagonal cage similar to the UFC's Octagon, counted with veterans Oleg Taktarov and Murilo Bustamante, and sponsored by Prince Tahnoun bin Zayed Al Nahyan, later known for his creation of the ADCC and investment in BJJ. The main event continued the Luta Livre-Jiu-Jitsu rivalry by matching LL representative Eugenio Tadeu and BJJ representative Renzo Gracie, both who also had a very personal rivalry. The fight went a back-and-forth between both contestants until members of the audience approached the cage and started to shout insults and interfere in the bout by attacking the contestants, Gracie fought back one of his attackers and soon after the confusion escalated into a full riot, as people threw chairs into the ring, supporters of both fighters brawled, warning shots were allegedly fired by security and the lights were turned off by the promoters to control the fight. The event was broadcast live on national television by Rede Globo's SporTV. The confusion resulted in the state of Rio de Janeiro banning Vale Tudo events for almost 10 years. Footage of the brawl was used by CNN in a special report order to condemn the sport in the United States.

As the UFC and similar promotions started to receive more rules. The premier organizations of the late 1990s became the World Vale Tudo Championship (WVC) and the International Vale Tudo Championship (IVC). The WVC was organized in 1996 by Frederico Lapenda and Sérgio Batarelli, the due promoted together four events, including Brazil's first Vale Tudo/MMA pay-per-view, but soon a dispute between the two led to Batarelli to leave and create the IVC. The two promotions featured prominently throughout the 1990s as they were also televised on Brazilian TV and pay-per-view. The WVC and IVC were based in the Brazilian financial capital of São Paulo and launched the careers of many of today's MMA stars. While based in Brazil, they also did international events: WVC did events in Japan, Aruba and Jamaica, while the IVC had events in Venezuela, Portugal and F.R of Yugoslavia. However, after the state of São Paulo prohibited Vale Tudo from being a sanctioned sport, both promotions went into decline and have not staged an event since 2002.

=== 2000s and end of Vale Tudo ===
Beginning in the early 2000s, newer promotions such as Jungle Fight and Bitetti Combat abandoned traditional Vale Tudo rules in favor of the safer mixed martial arts "Unified" rules. However, some promotions continued the use of traditional rules for a time, most notably Meca World Vale Tudo and Rio Heroes.

The latter in particular represented one of the last organized attempts to preserve the old Vale Tudo format. Founded by Jorge Pereira in Osasco, São Paulo, in 2007, Rio Heroes held more than ten editions of largely unrestricted fighting, with no gloves or time limits, and with only a handful of restrictions such as prohibitions on eye gouging, biting, and groin strikes. Headbutts, stomps, soccer kicks and other techniques prohibited under the Unified Rules were permitted. The tournament continued until 2009, when it was shut down, effectively marking the end of the last prominent organized promotion dedicated to the traditional Vale Tudo ruleset.

"Vale Tudo" was still used as a synonym for MMA in Brazil throughout the 2000s, the term started to be dropped as the sport grew and Brazilian media started to cover MMA events, first with RedeTV! covering UFC events in 2009, and in 2011 it was picked by Brazil's largest network Rede Globo.

Today, all major events use MMA rules, according to former IVC and WVC promoter Sérgio Batarelli in an interview to Brazilian online news G1 he affirmed: "But fighting with the rules from before is impossible. It's over. [...] It's the beginnings. There's no way back. Even because there are very few fighters who would venture into something like this."

Although the traditional form of Vale Tudo declined as a competitive format, the name continued to appear in Brazil in contexts associated with the history and identity of mixed martial arts. The expression was also retained in the names of some martial arts schools, competitions, and organizations, reflecting its continued significance in Brazilian combat sports culture. Traditional, no-rules Vale Tudo events continue only as small, informal and underground challenges.

== As a fighting style ==
As Vale Tudo became more popular and common, some fighters started training specifically for Vale Tudo contests rather than fighting with purely one style, taking the most effective techniques from both striking and grappling martial arts and synthesized them for the ruleset of Vale Tudo, eventually billing "Vale Tudo" as its own standalone fighting style.

Marco Ruas is recognized to be one of the first to do so. He was a Muay Thai striker and equally skilled in Luta Livre submission grappling; even before the first UFC event, he was a public proponent of cross-training in multiple martial arts and training specifically for Vale Tudo. Eventually he developed "Ruas Vale Tudo", which he advertised as a martial art. He and other fighters he coached—such as Pedro Rizzo and Renato Sobral—were billed as "Ruas Vale Tudo" fighters.

The Chute Boxe Academy in Curitiba started as a Muay Thai gym expanded their program with BJJ and grappling training in 1991, and eventually branded themselves as a "Vale Tudo" gym.

== See also ==
- International Vale Tudo Championship
- Mixed martial arts
- Luta Livre
- Brazilian jiu-jitsu
