= Eugenio Tadeu =

Brazilian Vale Tudo fighter

Eugênio Tadeu
- Born: 1965 (age 60–61); Rio de Janeiro, Brazil
- Nationality: Brazil
- Height: 1.73 m (5 ft 8 in)
- Weight: 170 lb (77 kg; 12 st 2 lb)
- Division: Welterweight; Openweight
- Style: Luta livre Muay Thai; Capoeira
- Fighting out of: Rio de Janeiro, Brazil
- Rank: 9th Dan Black Belt in Luta Livre Esportiva
- Years active: 1984–2003

Mixed martial arts record
- Total: 6
- Wins: 2
- By knockout: 1
- By submission: 1
- Losses: 3
- By knockout: 3
- No contests: 1

Eugenio Tadeu is a Brazilian grappler, Vale Tudo and mixed martial arts fighter. Tadeu was born in 1965. He was famous as a practitioner of Luta Livre, or Brazilian Submission wrestling

Tadeu is notable for representing Luta Livre in Vale Tudo/early MMA events. Especially on the feud between Luta Livre and Brazilian jiu-jitsu.

== Biography ==
In the JJ vs Martial Arts Challenge Vale Tudo event in 1984. Tadeu defeated BJJ representative Renan Pitanguy by TKO.

In 1991, he fought BJJ representative Wallid Ismail at the Desafio - Jiu Jitsu vs Luta Livre Vale Tudo event. The match saw both fighters extensively exchanging strikes, Ismail used his aggressive jiu-jitsu to takedown Tadeu and apply an early form of Ground-and-Pound, punishing him with headbutts and by throwing him outside the ring multiple times. After 16 minutes of fighting, Ismail threw him outside the ring one last time and the tired and injured Tadeu wasn't able to come back in, giving the victory to Ismail by TKO.

In 1988, as a retaliation for the street fight between Rickson Gracie and Hugo Duarte. Tadeu together with a group of 60-70 other Luta Livre fighters, some armed with knives and firearms, did a Dojo storm on Gracie Academy, seeking a rematch for the fight. Tadeu choose to fight Royler Gracie but the match was cancelled as police was called. A couple of days later, Rickson and Royler went to Tadeu's academy to settle the score and Tadeu fought Royler into an hour long draw. He was scheduled to fight Ralph Gracie but this never materialized. This was because Tadeu did not submit his visa in time.

=== Renzo Gracie fight ===
His most famous fight was with Renzo Gracie. Renzo and Tadeu were long time rivals. The rivalry has been described as being a Hatfield vs McCoy style rivalry because in South America machismo is the rule. Renzo once said "my name is not a bone to be carried in the jaw of a dog," before slapping the guy and declaring "you don't deserve my fist." This was Renzo's last bare knuckle fight. The riot from this fight led to MMA being banned from Rio de Janeiro. Renzo claimed he was dominating the fight, but was having issues due to the oil that was on Tadeu's body. After 15 minutes Renzo refused to rise and beckoned Tadau to grapple. Renzo punched a fan in the face, causing more fans to riot. The fight has been ranked one of the best fights to be ruled a no contest. The riot was featured on World's Dumbest Criminals and is listed as the #8 Worst Moment In MMA History by ESPN.

=== UFC ===
Eugenio Tadeu continued to represent Luta Livre, now in international events. He was invited to the Ultimate Fighting Championship where he participated at UFC 16 on the organization's inaugural Welterweight tournament. Tadeu fought Lion's Den graduate Mikey Burnett and lost to TKO after a 9:46 round.

== Mixed martial arts record ==
Professional record breakdown
6 matches	2 wins	3 losses
By knockout	1	3
By submission	1	0
No contests	1	

Res.	Record	Opponent	Method	Event	Date	Round	Time	Location	Notes
Loss	2–3 (1)	Marcelo Giudici	TKO (corner stoppage)	Meca World Vale Tudo 8	May 16, 2003	2	5:00	Curitiba, Brazil	
Loss	2–2 (1)	Mikey Burnett	TKO (punches)	UFC 16	March 13, 1998	1	9:46	Kenner, Louisiana	
NC	2–1 (1)	Renzo Gracie	NC (fans rioted)	Pentagon Combat	September 27, 1997	1	14:45	Rio de Janeiro, Brazil	
Win	2–1	Nigel Scantelbury	Submission (kimura)	UVF 3	August 14, 1996	1	2:20	Tokyo, Japan	
Loss	1–1	Wallid Ismail	TKO (injury)	Desafio - Jiu-Jitsu vs. Luta Livre	September 26, 1991	1	16:18	Rio de Janeiro, Brazil	
Win	1–0	Renan Pitanguy	TKO (corner stoppage)	Desafio - Jiu-Jitsu vs. Martial Arts	November 30, 1984	1	5:02	Rio de Janeiro, Brazil	
