= Rafael Cordeiro =

Brazilian mixed martial arts coach

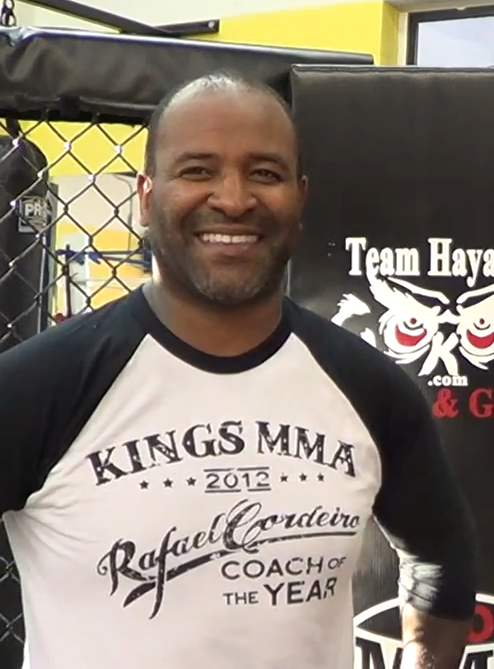
- Cordeiro in 2018
- Born: June 1, 1973 (age 53); Curitiba, Brazil
- Other names: Mestre
- Height: 5 ft 10 in (178 cm)
- Weight: 155 lb (70 kg; 11.1 st)
- Division: Lightweight
- Style: Muay Thai
- Team: Kings MMA (2010–present); Chute Boxe Academy (until 2009)

Mixed martial arts record
- Total: 6
- Wins: 4
- By knockout: 1
- By submission: 2
- By decision: 1
- Losses: 2
- By knockout: 0
- By submission: 1
- By decision: 1

Other information
- Mixed martial arts record from Sherdog

Rafael Cordeiro (born June 1, 1973) is a Brazilian mixed martial arts (MMA) coach and founder of the MMA gym Kings MMA. He is best known for training multiple MMA world champions.

== History ==
Cordeiro was a fighter affiliated with the Chute Boxe Academy where he participated in mixed martial arts and Muay Thai. He had his first Vale Tudo bout in August 1993, 2 months before UFC 1, against Capoeira practitioner Daniel Daniel defeating him in 42 seconds with a TKO after a cut. He was three-time Brazilian Muay Thai champion and lightweight champion at the International Vale Tudo Championship (IVC).

In 1999, Cordeiro stopped competing professionally and started his career as a full-time coach at Chute Boxe where would remain until 2009. In 2008 he moved to the United States and in 2010 opened his own gym, Kings MMA in Huntington Beach, California.

Cordeiro has won the 2012 and 2016 coach of the year awards for MMA.

In 2019, during the weigh-ins for UFC 244, the NYSAC "determined that Kelvin Gastelum made contact with another person while on the scale, a violation of the weigh in policy". This was because he was in contact with Cordeiro, who was his coach for the bout. As a result, Gastelum and Rafael Cordeiro were fined $1,000 and $200 respectively by New York State Athletic Commission.

In 2020, Cordeiro was trainer and cornerman to the former boxing world heavyweight champion, Mike Tyson for his exhibition bout against Roy Jones Jr.

== Notable students ==
=== Mixed martial arts ===
- Anderson Silva - Former UFC Middleweight Champion
- Maurício Rua - Former UFC Light Heavyweight Champion and 2005 PRIDE Middleweight Grand Prix Champion
- Wanderlei Silva - Former PRIDE Middleweight Champion and the 2003 PRIDE Middleweight Grand Prix Tournament Champion
- Fabrício Werdum - Former UFC Heavyweight Champion
- Rafael dos Anjos - Former UFC Lightweight Champion
- Cris Cyborg - Former UFC Women's Featherweight Champion
- Lyoto Machida - Former UFC Light Heavyweight Champion
- Murilo Rua - Former EliteXC Middleweight Champion
- Beneil Dariush - Former RITC Lightweight Champion
- Marvin Vettori - Former VFC Welterweight Champion
- Kelvin Gastelum
- Giga Chikadze

=== Boxing ===
- Mike Tyson - Undisputed world heavyweight champion from 1987 to 1990

== Championships and accomplishments ==
- International Vale Tudo Championship
  - IVC Lightweight Championship (One time)
- World MMA Awards
  - 2012 The Shawn Tompkins Coach of the Year
  - 2015 The Shawn Tompkins Coach of the Year

== Mixed martial arts record ==
Professional record breakdown
6 matches	4 wins	2 losses
By knockout	1	0
By submission	2	1
By decision	1	0
By disqualification	0	1

Res.	Record	Opponent	Method	Event	Date	Round	Time	Location	Notes
Loss	4–2	Rumina Sato	Submission (kneebar)	VTJ 1999 - Vale Tudo Japan 1999	December 11, 1999	1	0:58	Japan	
Win	4–1	Henry Matamoros	Decision (unanimous)	IVC 9 - The Revenge	January 20, 1999	1	30:00	Brazil	Won IVC Lightweight Championship
Loss	3–1	Sergio Melo	DQ (rope grabbing)	IVC 7 - The New Champions	August 23, 1998	1	11:32	Brazil	
Win	3–0	Altair de Oliveira	Submission (rear-naked choke)	BVF 4 - Circuito de Lutas 7	August 1, 1996	1	2:24	Brazil	
Win	2–0	Cosminho da Silva	Submission (rear-naked choke)	BVF 4 - Circuito de Lutas 7	August 1, 1996	1	3:38	Brazil	
Win	1–0	Daniel Daniel	TKO (cut)	CP X CB - Capoeira vs. Chute Boxe	August 29, 1993	1	0:42	Brazil	
