= Rei Zulu =

Brazilian mixed martial artist

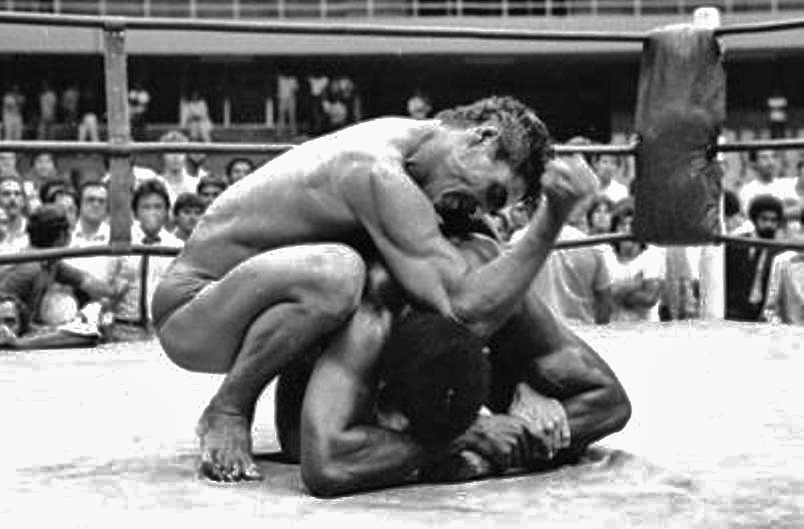
- Rei Zulu (bottom) during his fight with Rickson Gracie
- Born: Casemiro de Nascimento Martins; June 9, 1947 (age 79); São Luís, Maranhão, Brazil
- Height: 6 ft 3 in (191 cm)
- Weight: 220 lb (100 kg; 15 st 10 lb)
- Division: Heavyweight
- Style: Tarracá, Vale Tudo, Brazilian Jiu-Jitsu
- Years active: 1963–2009

Mixed martial arts record
- Total: 10
- Wins: 2
- By knockout: 1
- By submission: 0
- By decision: 1
- Losses: 8
- By knockout: 3
- By submission: 2
- By decision: 3

Other information
- Mixed martial arts record from Sherdog

Casimiro de Nascimento Martins, better known as Rei Zulu (born 9 June 1947), is a Brazilian retired vale tudo fighter who specialized in tarracá, a traditional fighting style from his native Maranhão. Rei Zulu had been and continues to be considered a legendary figure in the MMA scene in Brazil, particularly in the vale tudo circuit. He is also the father of MMA fighter Zuluzinho.

== Biography and career ==
Rei Zulu became famous for traveling throughout Brazil and challenging various fighters from Brazil and other parts of the world. In 1980, after 17 years of competition, his career had initially ended after approximately 150 fights after being caught in a guillotine move by Euclides Pereira. It was then that Rei Zulu sent out a challenge to the Gracie family to prove who was the best vale-tudo fighter in Brazil. The undefeated Rickson Gracie fought Rei Zulu, who had to that point a 170–0 record and was alleged to have had up to 270 wins in the vale tudo circuit, in a televised fight that was historic for the development of the Brazilian MMA scene. In a hard-fought fight, Rei Zulu lost to Gracie by decision. In a reunion between the two, he was defeated again by decision. However, on 30 November 1984, he had his most major victory against competitor Sérgio Batarelli, a kickboxing fighter, during the JJ vs MA-Jiu-Jitsu vs Martial Arts event.

After winning against Batarelli, continued to fight. In 1990, he was defeated by knockout by James Adler. On 6 April 2000, in the state of Piauí, in a televised fight, Rei Zulu, at 55 years old, lost to kung fu fighter Wellington Dourado. Rei Zulu lost when he was pushed by Wellington out of the ring and fell, hitting his head and went unconscious. Rei Zulu went on to allege that such a move was illegal and that Wellington should have been disqualified. Despite him getting older and into advanced age, he would continue on, having 3 wins due to knockouts at 62 years old. He began to instruct his son Zuluzinho and would accompany him to fights. He had mentioned of intentions to fight other fighters such as Skip Hall and Dan Severn. One of his last fights was against Santos Samurai in the Desafio de Giantes 10 event in 2008.

For a long time, Rei Zulu had been considered worldwide as one of the fighters in the MMA scene with a brawler tactic, ones without a singular style and fought mainly with stronghanded fighting tactics. Years later, however, he revealed in an interview that he learned from his father a traditional fighting style from his home state of Maranhão, which he had also passed onto his son, called tarracá, which is very popular in the regions of Pindaré and the lowland region of Maranhão.

== MMA career ==
Rei Zulu had a long career in vale-tudo, and before his emblematic duel with Rickson Gracie, he came to be seen as invincible during the time in which he had 150 fights in a span of 17 years, but due to a lack of precise information, it was not possible to compile a complete list of his fight history.

Result	Record	Opponent	Method	Event	Date	Round	Time	Location	Notes
Loss	3-8	Santos Samurai	Disqualification	Desafio de Gigantes 10	6 July 2008	2	5:00	Macapá, Brazil	
Victory	3-7	Wesslan Evaristo de Oliveira	Submission	Zulu Combat 1	20 January 2007	1	0:28	São Luís, Maranhão, Brazil	
Loss	2-7	Enson Inoue	TKO	Shooto: Reconquista 2	6 April 1997	1	0:45	Tokyo, Japan	
Loss	2-6	Kunta Kinte	Submission	BVF: Circuito de Lutas 7	1 August 1996	1	N/A	Rio de Janeiro, Brazil	
Loss	2-5	Ebenezer Fontes Braga	N/A	Freestyle de Belem 1	1 July 1996	1	N/A	Belém, Brazil	
Loss	2-4	Pedro Otavio	Disqualification	Desafío - International Vale Tudo	1 January 1995	1	11:54	Rio de Janeiro, Brazil	
Victory	2-3	Sérgio Batarelli	Submission	Jiu-Jitsu vs Martial Arts	30 December 1984	1	2:24	Rio de Janeiro, Brazil	
Loss	1-3	Rickson Gracie	Submission	Independent promotion	1 January 1984	1	N/A	Rio de Janeiro, Brazil	
Loss	1-2	Rickson Gracie	Submission	Independent promotion	25 April 1980	1	11:55	Brasília, Brazil	
Loss	1-1	Euclides Pereira	Submission	Independent promotion	1 January 1979	1	N/A	Brazil	
Victory	1-0	Touro Moreno	Decision	Independent promotion	1 June 1971	1	N/A	Vitória, Espírito Santo, Brazil	

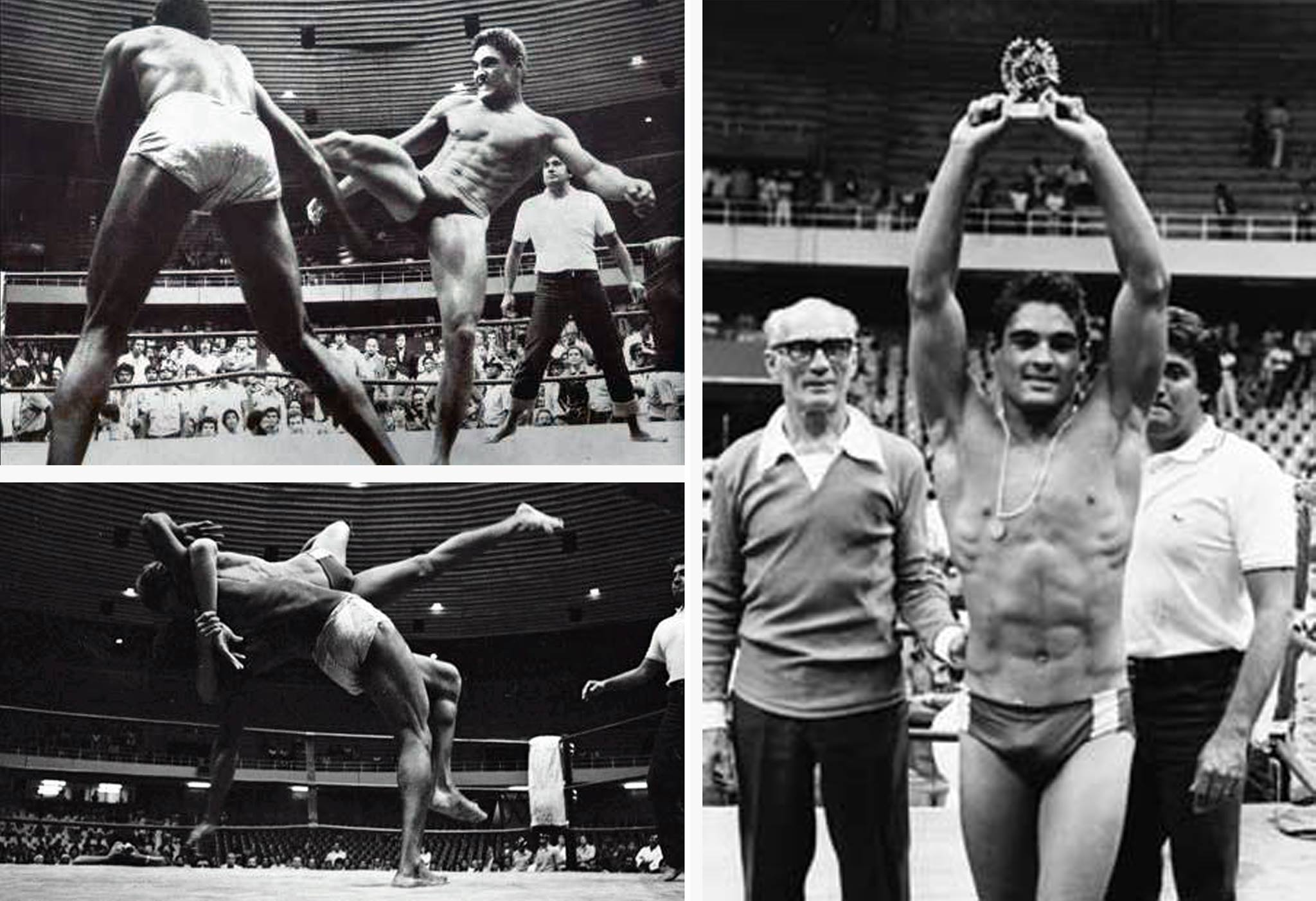
Further images of Rei Zulu fighting Rickson Gracie
