= Johil de Oliveira =

Brazilian martial artist

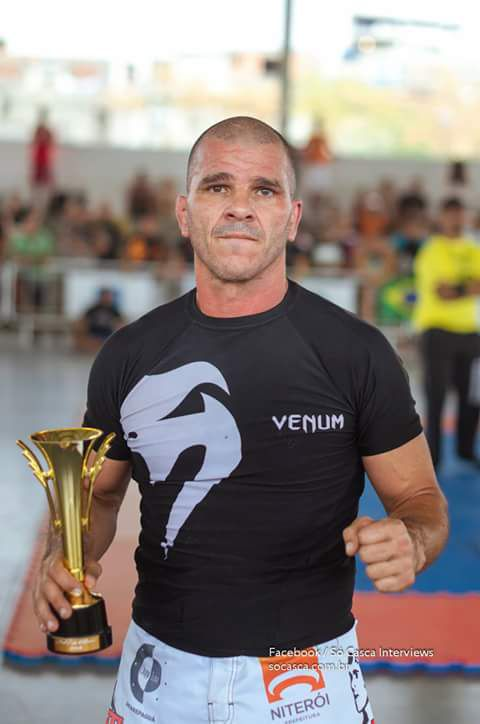
- Born: August 7, 1969 (age 57); Maricá, Rio de Janeiro, Brazil
- Other names: Samurai do Fogo (Fire Samurai)
- Height: 1.73 m (5 ft 8 in)
- Weight: 73 kg (161 lb; 11.5 st)
- Style: Luta Livre, Muay Thai
- Stance: Orthodox
- Fighting out of: Rio de Janeiro, Brazil
- Team: Johil Team
- Rank: 8th Dan Black Belt in Luta Livre; Grao Mestre rank in Muay Thai (Confederação Brasileira de Muay Thai)
- Years active: 1995-2019

Mixed martial arts record
- Total: 19
- Wins: 17
- By knockout: 5
- By submission: 6
- By decision: 6
- Losses: 0
- By knockout: 3
- By submission: 5>
- By decision: 8
- Draws: 1
- No contests: 1

Other information
- Mixed martial arts record from Sherdog

Johil de Oliveira (born August 7, 1969) is a Brazilian former professional mixed martial arts veteran fighter, Luta Livre practitioner who has competed in Japan's Pride Fighting Championships and Brazilian-based organizations such as World Vale Tudo Championship (WVC), IVC, Jungle Fight, UVF, BVF, Bitetti Combat and International ones such as Shooto and Cage Rage. Nicknamed "Samurai do Fogo" (Portuguese for "Fire Samurai"), he has been one of the major supporters of Luta Livre in Brazil and Worldwide, alongside Marco Ruas, Alexandre Franca Nogueira and Hugo Duarte.

== Mixed martial arts career ==
=== Early career ===
de Oliveira made his MMA debut in 1994 during the first edition of Gaisei Challenge Vale Tudo in Rio de Janeiro, with a submission win over Paulo de Jesus. In his next bout he faced Carlson Gracie protege, Crezio de Souza at Duelo de Titas in Rio de Janeiro, despite nearly knocking de Souza out, he lost via submission in the first round.

After this setback, de Oliveira established his reputation as a top Brazilian fighter by winning two one-night tournaments, BVF 2 and BVF 6. He won four of these matches by Submission (combat sports). He made his lone United States fighting appearance, fighting to a draw against John Lewis during the third Extreme Fighting Event and had his first fight in Japan against S.A.W. Black Belt, Akira Nagase, winning, despite breaking his hand, via TKO between rounds when the ring-side physician determined Nagase unable to continue. During this period he fought and won Super-Fights in Universal Vale Tudo. He entered World Vale Tudo Championship 4 one-night tournament, as an alternate, defeating Koji Lierman via Rear Naked Choke, and stepping in as a replacement in the semi-finals against the then undefeated Jose Landi-Jons, better known as Pelé, due to Rick Lucero withdrawing from his fight due to a broken jaw. Despite being lighter than his opponent, de Oliveira took Landi-Jones down, and delivered heavy ground and pound from inside his opponents guard bloodying him with multiple kind of strikes, specially with headbutts, delivering a record of 98 headbutts during the bout. This situation prolonged itself for the entire duration of the fight, with Landi-Jones trying armlocks, strikes from the bottom and attempting to stand up to use his trademark Muay Thai, but de Oliveira avoided and prevented those things and kept delivering punishment, after 30 minutes of fighting, the judges decision was given to de Oliveira, giving Landi-Jons his first defeat. However, he then withdrew from his next fight with teammate Marcelo Aguiar before it began due to the injuries he received in his previous bout. In spite of that, he was ranked as the number one Welterweight for a period of time by Brazilian Magazine Tatame.

=== International Vale Tudo Championship ===
After enjoying success at World Vale Tudo Championship, de Oliveira became a part of the roster of International Vale Tudo Championship, fighting and defeating Brazilian fighter Joao Bosco via TKO in the first Round and also becoming the IVC Super-Fight Champion. Attempting to continuing his success, de Oliveira faced Carlson Gracie protege and Brazilian jiu-jitsu Black Belt, Wallid Ismail to become the second IVC Super Fight Champion, at IVC 3. Early in the bout Ismail took de Oliveira down, and managed to hold him down for the entire duration of the bout, until defeating de Oliveira via strikes in the first round, snapping his ten fight unbeaten streak.

Following the defeat to Ismail, de Oliveira entered the 8 man tournament that was held at IVC 5, facing against American Wrestler and Brazilian Top Team Wrestling coach, Darrel Gholar in the quarter-finals, managing to get the Unanimous Decision after a grueling and bloody bout that went the entire 30 minute duration. Having to step out from his following bout against Milton Bahia, due having broken his foot during his previous bout.

His final appearance in IVC, was a Lightweight Championship Bout against rival Jose Landi Jons. Attempting to repeat the same feat of his previous bout against Landi-Jons, de Oliveira took Landi-Jons down and held him down for half of the bout, until referee Sergio Batarelli decided to stand the fighters up due to inactivity. This is considered to be controversial due to the fact that inside Vale Tudo rules this is not supposed to happen, plus the fact that the crowd was partial to Landi-Jons repeatedly booed the action. After the fight was resumed, de Oliveira unsuccessfully tried to take Landi-Jons down, repeatedly going to the ground in order to get into a position favorable to him due to his Luta Livre background. The bout ended with Landi-Jons using his Muay Thai to control the fight and winning the 30 minute bout via Unanimous Decision.

=== PRIDE Fighting Championships ===
After his bout with Landi-Jons, de Oliveira then came to Japan to fight against Matt Serra at Pride 9, but in an infamous and unfortunate event, de Oliveira had an accidental burning caused by a pyrotechnics explosion in the backstage, leaving him with third degree burns and a six month stint inside a hospital. It has been reported that Pride FC officials offered him an "easy three fight" deal as a compensation of the accident for an undisclosed amount of money. Before de Oliveiras first fight after the accident, he had a car accident which left him with vision problems. His first fight was against perennial contender and at the time future UFC Welterweight Championship title holder, Carlos Newton, losing via Unanimous Decision at Pride 12. It is worth mentioning that before he entered the ring, de Oliveira grabbed a nearby Fire extinguisher and despite protests from the Pride officials, entered the arena carrying the extinguisher to the delight of the audience, who nicknamed him the "Fire Samurai" or Samurai do Fogo.

After the Carlos Newton fight, de Oliveira faced Brazilian jiu jitsu black belt Nino Schembri at Pride 14, losing via Armbar in the first round. de Oliveira's last Pride appearance was in a losing effort against Daiju Takase at Pride FC: The Best, Vol. 1.

=== After PRIDE ===
After his loses at Pride, de Oliveira returned to Brazil to compete in several local organizations. During this period he made a lone appearance in the British MMA promotion Cage Rage, against Mark Weir at Cage Rage 8 being defeated via Arm triangle choke at the 1:35 mark of the first round. During this period, de Oliveira had a nine fight losing streak, mired in complications with his eyesight and fighting against names such as Carlos Newton, Nino Schembri, Rodrigo Damm, Daiju Takase, Mark Weir and future UFC Lightweight Championship winner Rafael dos Anjos.

In spite of his mixed results, de Oliveira kept on fighting inside promotions such as Jungle Fight, Shooto Brazil and Cage Rage, ending a more than twenty year career in 2019 with a loss against Haroldo Bunn at Shooto Brasil 87: BOPE

== Personal life ==
de Oliveira is also a graduate of Law School and currently works as a dog trainer in his natal city of Maricá.

== Championships and achievements ==
=== Mixed Martial Arts ===
- International Vale Tudo Championship
  - Super Fight Champion at IVC 2
- World Vale Tudo Championship
  - Winner of Alternate Fight at WVC 4
  - World Vale Tudo Championship 4 Semifinalist
  - Most headbutts landed in a single fight in WVC history (98 vs. Jose Landi-Jons at WVC 4)Video on YouTube
- Universal Vale Tudo Fighting
  - Winner of Universal Vale Tudo Fighting 1 Super Fight
  - Winner of Universal Vale Tudo Fighting 5 Super Fight
- Brazilian Vale Tudo Fighting
  - Brazilian Vale Tudo Fighting 2 - Tournament Winner (1996)
  - Brazilian Vale Tudo Fighting 6 - Tournament Winner (1996)
- Jungle Fight
  - Winner of Jungle Fight 11 Super Fight
  - Winner of Jungle Fight 14: Ceará Super Fight
- Shooto Brasil
  - Winner of Shooto Brasil 25 Super Fight
- Sao Jose Super Fight
  - Sao Jose Super Fight - Masters Champion (2011)
- Gaisei Challenge Vale Tudo
  - Gaisei Challenge Vale Tudo Champion (1994)
- The Best Fight Japan
  - The Best Fight Japan 1 Winner (1994)
  - The Best Fight Japan 3 Winner (1995)
- Tatame Magazine
  - Ranked Number One at 170lbs in 1998

=== Luta Livre ===
- Three-time Carioca Luta Livre Esportiva Champion (Brazil)
- Five-time Copa Budokan of Luta Livre Esportiva Champion (Brazil-Rio de Janeiro)
- Champion of Copa Uniao of Luta Livre Esportiva

=== Brazilian Jiu Jitsu ===
- Pan American Champion
- Tereré Challenge Masters Champion (2019)
- International Masters - Senior Champion

=== Muay Thai ===
- Carioca Champion (Rio de Janeiro)

=== Amateur Wrestling ===
- Carioca Champion in Greco-Roman wrestling (Rio de Janeiro)

== Mixed martial arts record ==
Professional record breakdown
| 35 matches | 17 wins | 16 losses |
| By knockout | 5 | 3 |
| By submission | 6 | 5 |
| By decision | 6 | 8 |
| Draws | 1 | |
| No contests | 1 | |

| Res. | Record | Opponent | Method | Event | Date | Round | Time | Location | Notes |
|---|---|---|---|---|---|---|---|---|---|
| Loss | 17–16–1 (1) | Haroldo Bunn | Submission (Armbar) | Shooto Brasil 87: BOPE | August 24, 2018 | 1 | 4:38 | Rio de Janeiro, Brazil | Retirement Fight. |
| Loss | 17–15–1 (1) | Christian Squeti | Decision (unanimous) | Sao Jose Super Fight 2 | June 9, 2012 | 3 | 5:00 | São José, Santa Catarina, Brazil | For the Sao Jose Super Fight Masters Championship. |
| Win | 17–14–1 (1) | Marcos Tulio | Decision (unanimous) | Sao Jose Super Fight 1 | October 1, 2011 | 3 | 5:00 | São José, Santa Catarina, Brazil | For the Sao Jose Super Fight Masters Championship. |
| Win | 16–14–1 (1) | Haroldo Bunn | TKO (doctor stoppage) | Shooto Brazil 25: Fight for BOPE | August 25, 2011 | 2 | 4:09 | Rio de Janeiro, Brazil | |
| Loss | 15–14–1 (1) | Eduardo Simoes | Decision (unanimous) | Fatality Arena 3 | May 28, 2011 | 3 | 5:00 | Niterói, Rio de Janeiro, Brazil | |
| NC | 15–13–1 (1) | Alessandro Ferreira | NC (illegal spike) | Jungle Fight 22 | September 18, 2010 | 1 | 0:32 | São Paulo, Brazil | |
| Loss | 15–13–1 | Ivan Iberico | TKO (punches) | Inka FC 6 - Peru vs. Brazil | July 16, 2009 | 2 | 3:50 | Lima, Peru | |
| Win | 15–12–1 | Rodrigo Jacome | Submission (kimura) | Jungle Fight 14: Ceará | May 9, 2009 | 1 | 3:04 | Fortaleza, Brazil | |
| Win | 14–12–1 | Danilo Noronha | Decision (unanimous) | Jungle Fight 11 | September 13, 2008 | 3 | 5:00 | Rio de Janeiro, Brazil | |
| Loss | 13–12–1 | Rodrigo Damm | Decision | Universidade Fight Show 1 | October 7, 2007 | 3 | 5:00 | Espírito Santo, Brazil | |
| Win | 13–11–1 | Jonatas Novaes | Decision (majority) | Open Fight | August 4, 2007 | N/A | N/A | Brazil | |
| Loss | 12–11–1 | Rafael dos Anjos | Submission (rear-naked choke) | Juiz de Fora - Fight 4 | April 14, 2007 | 1 | 2:50 | Brazil | |
| Loss | 12–10–1 | Leonardo Soares | Decision (split) | Juiz de Fora - Fight 3 | April 8, 2006 | 3 | 5:00 | Brazil | |
| Loss | 12–9–1 | Alexandre Barros | TKO (doctor stoppage) | Rio MMA Challenge 1 | May 12, 2005 | N/A | N/A | Rio de Janeiro, Brazil | |
| Loss | 12–8–1 | Mark Weir | Submission (arm-triangle choke) | Cage Rage 8 | September 11, 2004 | 1 | 1:35 | London, England | |
| Loss | 12–7–1 | Silmar Rodrigo | Decision (unanimous) | Bitetti Combat Nordeste 2 | March 20, 2003 | 3 | 5:00 | Natal, Brazil | |
| Loss | 12–6–1 | Daiju Takase | Decision (unanimous) | Pride The Best Vol.1 | February 22, 2002 | 3 | 5:00 | Tokyo, Japan | |
| Loss | 12–5–1 | Nino Schembri | Submission (armbar) | Pride 14 - Clash of the Titans | May 27, 2001 | 1 | 7:17 | Yokohama, Japan | |
| Loss | 12–4–1 | Carlos Newton | Decision (unanimous) | Pride 12 - Cold Fury | December 23, 2000 | 2 | 5:00 | Saitama, Japan | |
| Loss | 12–3–1 | Jose Landi-Jons | Decision (unanimous) | IVC 11 | April 27, 1999 | 1 | 30:00 | Brazil | For the IVC Lightweight Championship. |
| Win | 12–2–1 | Darrel Gholar | Decision (unanimous) | IVC 5 | April 26, 1998 | 1 | 30:00 | São Paulo, Brazil | International Vale Tudo Championship 5 Quarterfinals. |
| Loss | 11–2–1 | Wallid Ismail | Submission (punches) | IVC 3 | December 10, 1997 | 1 | 9:48 | Brazil | For the IVC Super Fight Championship. |
| Win | 11–1–1 | Joao Bosco | TKO (punches) | IVC 2 | September 15, 1997 | 1 | 8:33 | Brazil | For the IVC Super Fight Championship. |
| Win | 10–1–1 | José Landi-Jons | Decision (unanimous) | World Vale Tudo Championship 4 | March 16, 1997 | 1 | 30:00 | Brazil | World Vale Tudo Fighting 4 Semifinals. |
| Win | 9–1–1 | Koji Lierman | Submission (rear naked choke) | World Vale Tudo Championship 4 | March 16, 1997 | 1 | 0:45 | Brazil | World Vale Tudo Championship 4 Alternate Fight. |
| Win | 8–1–1 | Cristian Martinez | TKO (retirement) | Universal Vale Tudo Fighting 5 | January 30, 1997 | 1 | 4:59 | Brazil | Universal Vale Tudo Fighting 5 Super Fight. |
| Win | 7–1–1 | Claudionor Cardoso da Silva | Submission (strikes) | BVF 6 - Campeonato Brasileiro de Vale Tudo 1 | November 1, 1996 | 1 | 6:47 | Brazil | Brazilian Vale Tudo Fighting 6 Finals. |
| Win | 6–1–1 | Ernando dos Santos | Submission (rear naked choke) | BVF 6 - Campeonato Brasileiro de Vale Tudo 1 | November 1, 1996 | 1 | 2:49 | Brazil | Brazilian Vale Tudo Fighting 6 Semifinals. |
| Draw | 5–1–1 | John Lewis | Draw | Extreme Fighting 3 | October 18, 1996 | 3 | 5:00 | Tulsa, Oklahoma, United States | |
| Win | 5–1 | Luis Eduardo Fraga | Decision | Brazilian Vale Tudo Fighting 2 | May 31, 1996 | 2 | 10:00 | Brazil | Brazilian Vale Tudo Fighting 2 Finals. |
| Win | 4–1 | Claudionor Cardoso da Silva | Submission (rear naked choke) | Brazilian Vale Tudo Fighting 2 | May 31, 1996 | 1 | 5:11 | Brazil | Brazilian Vale Tudo Fighting 2 Semifinals. |
| Win | 3–1 | Alexandre Sagatte | Submission (armbar) | Brazilian Vale Tudo Fighting 2 | May 31, 1996 | 1 | 2:23 | Brazil | Brazilian Vale Tudo Fighting 2 Quarterfinals. |
| Win | 2–1 | Akira Nagase | TKO (doctor stoppage) | Universal Vale Tudo Fighting 1 | April 5, 1996 | 1 | 10:00 | Tokyo, Japan | Universal Vale Tudo Fighting 1 Super Fight. |
| Loss | 1–1 | Crezio de Souza | Submission (rear-naked choke) | DDT - Duelo de Titas | September 1, 1995 | 1 | N/A | Rio de Janeiro, Brazil | |
| Win | 1–0 | Paulo de Jesus | Submission (choke) | Gaisei Challenge Vale Tudo | July 25, 1994 | 1 | 0:45 | Rio de Janeiro, Brazil | |
