= Wallid Ismail =

Brazilian mixed martial arts fighter

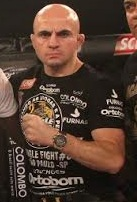
- Ismail at Jungle Fight 88.
- Born: Wallid Farid Ismail; 23 February 1968 (age 58); Manaus, Brazil
- Other names: Gracie Killer; The Destroyer
- Height: 5 ft 7 in (1.70 m)
- Weight: 183 lb (83 kg; 13.1 st)
- Division: Middleweight
- Fighting out of: Rio de Janeiro
- Team: Carlson Gracie Team
- Trainer: Carlson Gracie, Georges Mehdi, Ary Almeida
- Rank: Coral belt in Brazilian jiu-jitsu under Carlson Gracie; Black belt in Judo under Georges Mehdi
- Years active: 1991–2002

Mixed martial arts record
- Total: 12
- Wins: 9
- By knockout: 2
- By submission: 5
- By decision: 2
- Losses: 3
- By knockout: 1
- By decision: 2

Other information
- Occupation: Fight promoter
- Mixed martial arts record from Sherdog
- Last updated on: December 11, 2009

Wallid Farid Ismail (Arabic: وليد فريد إسماعيل, born February 23, 1968) is a Brazilian former mixed martial artist, promoter and fighter manager.

Ismail holds a black belt in Brazilian jiu-jitsu (BJJ) under Carlson Gracie, and is an IVC mixed martial arts world champion and BJJ Champion. Ismail is considered one of the first professional fighters in BJJ because of his specially dedicated training, as he had many sponsors and did not have to teach or have another job, unlike most of the other competitors in the country at the time. In mixed martial arts, Ismail is also considered a pioneer, having his first official fight in the Vale Tudo event Desafio - Jiu Jitsu vs. Luta Livre in 1991, also having competed for the UFC, and PRIDE, most of his wins in MMA came by way of submission.

After his career, he became heavily involved in the business side of MMA. He is the founder and promoter of Jungle Fight, Brazil's largest MMA promotion, and also manager of multiple fighters.

== Background ==
Of Palestinian Brazilian heritage, Ismail started training in Brazilian jiu-jitsu in 1980 in his home state of Amazonas in Brazil under Ary Almeida, and then, in 1984, he moved to Rio de Janeiro, Brazil, and started training under his master, the late Carlson Gracie, who described Ismail as a "hairy and chubby guy," but had a desire to succeed, as he would be known for later in his career and stayed by the side of his master until the day Carlson died in 2006. Gracie had allowed Ismail to train with his camp even though Ismail had no money to afford the teaching." Wallid then started to compete in jiu-jitsu tournaments, becoming champion several times, and defeating four members of the famous Gracie family in competition.

=== Victories over the Gracie family ===
Ismail was willing to face the Gracie family's main branch due to their enmity with their relative Carlson. Ismail had also expressed: "I always felt belittled for not being born with the Gracie name. Some of the Gracies never trained at all, but they got all this attention. Other people trained just as hard, but no one paid them the least bit of attention."

After his first championship wins, Ismail had a famous duel with Ralph Gracie, whom he believed the Gracie family had trained specifically to beat him for three years. The Carlson Gracie apprentice defeated Ralph at the Copa Rio Sport Center, winning a referee decision. In 1993, Wallid scored another victory over a Gracie when he defeated Renzo Gracie, who would have been training for two years for revenge. Ismail then challenged the main members of the family, Rickson and Royce, stating that he would fight them in any style anywhere.

Only Royce accepted the challenge, though demanding special conditions for the fight, like having no point scoring and no time limit, thus making the fight only winnable by submission. With renowned Hélio Vigio as the referee, the bout took place on December 17, 1998, and was won by Ismail after four minutes and fifty three seconds, choking Gracie unconscious with the Relógio (also known as clock choke or koshi-jime in judo), a move that has been associated with Wallid ever since. The bout had a significant international repercussion due to Royce's previous career in Ultimate Fighting Championship, to the point Keith Vargo from the Black Belt magazine stated, "One thing is certain: Royce Gracie is no longer the messiah of unarmed combat he once was."

After the match, Ismail challenged Rickson again, but the latter was declared inactive in the sport. Royce's side tried then to negotiate a rematch, which was accepted, but according to Ismail, they withdrew from the proposition after several months. Rickson later criticized Ismail, calling him an "average fighter" and stating "I never felt like he's someone I have to respect as a fighter."

Wallid was also famous for his personal enmity with Ryan Gracie. Ryan agreed to fight Wallid at mixed martial arts match at World Extreme Cagefighting in January 2000; however, Ryan dropped out of the event, and instead proposed fighting in April 2001, but he had to drop again after being arrested for fighting in a bar.

=== Feud with Edson Carvalho ===
In 1996, Wallid was involved in a violent incident with Edson Carvalho, a judo black belt and fellow Carlson Gracie trainee. The matter took place in Georges Mehdi's judo school, which both Ismail and Carvalho were attending at the time. After heated words among the two, a sparring turned into an all-out fight when Ismail and Carvalho attacked each other. Mehdi intervened to break up the brawl and expel them out of the academy, but the two fighters resumed fighting as soon as they were in the street. Seeing the situation, Mehdi opted for calling the police, but it arrived too late and didn't compromise to break up the violence, and meanwhile Wallid was brutally beaten down and left unconscious and profusely bleeding. After the incident was finally over, Ismail had to be attended by Mehdi himself and spent a week in an ICU, with 20 stitches in his head, both orbital bones broken and many other facial injuries.

The incident had deep repercussions. Carvalho's coach, Antônio Lacerda a.k.a. Mestre da Morte, declared himself prideful of his trainee's act and actually paraded through the city with the bloody gi jacket of Ismail. Carlson Gracie, who was teaching in United States at the time, returned to Brazil and attacked Lacerda in a public meeting, challenging him to a fight, but nothing came from it. Ismail claims that Edson's brother Ricardo Carvalho intervened actively in the brawl and that it became a 2-on-1, but Mehdi himself dismissed this version and assured that the fight was fair.

"The fight started in my academy. I ordered Wallid and Edson to stop. They conceded but soon started it again. Then I sent them outside, because my academy is not the place for this type of fight. Since they would not let go of each other I had to push them outside close the doors and call the cops. And the fight out there went on for half an hour since the police was not coming quickly. Sometimes I opened the door and tried to separate them but it was like separating a dog fight. Edson did not obey me and then I asked Wallid to stop it, asking for mercy he replied "not even dead". It is important to remind you that at no moment Edson's brother helped him: Wallid and Edson fought alone. When the police arrived with reinforcements, Edson left. I took Wallid with a totally disfigured face to the restroom and had him cleaned. Afterwards he was taken to the hospital wherein he stayed for days"

== Mixed martial arts ==
=== Early career at Vale Tudo ===
In 1991, Wallid Ismail, at the time a brown belt, caused controversy for publishing incendiary and provocative articles in newspaper O Dia where he declared Luta Livre—whose practitioners had a rivalry with jiu-jitsu—was nothing more than a cheap copy of BJJ and its fighters were inferior, challenging Luta Livre fighters for a fight. In response, a few days later a group of Luta Livre invaded the Copa Nastra jiu-jitsu tournament, which Ismail was competing, in order to fight him. The situation was descalated by Carlson Gracie who instead offered to the Luta Livre fighters to instead organize a public challenge between the two martial arts. Robson Gracie, who became the promoter of the event, convinced Rede Globo, Brazil's largest media network, to broadcast the event live on television. He first pitched to the network as a pure submission grappling event, but changed the rules to be a no-holds-barred Vale Tudo event. The event became known as Desafio - Jiu Jitsu vs Luta Livre, Ismail was escalated to represent BJJ and fight Luta Livre representative Eugenio Tadeu. The match saw both fighters extensively exchanging strikes, Ismail used his aggressive jiu-jitsu to takedown Tadeu and apply an early form of Ground-and-Pound, punishing him with headbutts and by throwing him outside the ring multiple times. After 16 minutes of fighting, Ismail threw him outside the ring one last time and the tired and injured Tadeu wasn't able to come back in, giving the victory to Ismail by TKO.

He later went to compete at Universal Vale Tudo Fighting. He first fought Australian Dennis Kefalinos, winning in short time, and went to face Japanese professional wrestler Katsumi Usuda, hailing from Pro Wrestling Fujiwara Gumi. Katsumi offered resistance to Wallid's attempts to pass guard, but he was eventually mounted and punched. The fight then turned controversial, as Usuda tapped out unceasingly only for the referee to ignore it and allow Ismail to choke him out. They met again in Japan, but Ismail won again.

In 1998, he defeated Johil de Oliveira by submission due to strikes, and then defeated Gary Myers via decision.

=== Ultimate Fighting Championship ===
In 1997, Ismail had his debut for Ultimate Fighting Championship at the UFC 12 event, where he was paired with Pancrase fighter Kazuo Takahashi. The fight would become infamous for its irregularities and disregard for the rules, as Takahashi seemed to be uninformed of the event's ruleset, continuously grabbing the fence in response to takedown attempts, while Ismail intentionally ignored them later on.

When Wallid first tried to take Kazuo down, they hit the cage wall and stayed on it, grabbing the fence despite the referee's continuous warnings. Shortly after, Wallid went on to score multiple successful takedown attempts, though Kazuo went on to knock Wallid down with a right hand, which at first seemed to end the fight, but the Japanese wrestler stood waiting, believing his opponent would receive a 10 count like it was done in Pancrase; when he learned that the match would continue, he tried to kick Ismail, but it happened to be an illegal attack because he was wearing wrestling shoes. Recovering the pace, Ismail eye-gouged Kazuo, which was also legal, after which the Japanese wrestler asked for time to check it out, which was refused, as the UFC didn't include it in their rules unlike Pancrase. Takahashi had also to be informed of the end of the round, as he didn't know its duration. However, the most shocking event of the night came at its end: having been informed that groin attacks were legal, Takahashi slid his hand inside Ismail's trunks, tore away his protective cup and started striking his groin, which the Brazilian tried to counter by eye-gouging him again. Ismail lost the fight by unanimous decision.

After the bout, Ismail criticized his opponent for holding the fence, though he also stated him being in bad shape as another reason for his defeat.

=== PRIDE ===
Ismail then signed with PRIDE FC, making his debut at Pride 4 against Japanese fighter Akira Shoji. Although he was the smaller fighter, Ismail controlled Shoji early, but later in the fight, Ismail became exhausted and Shoji finished him with strikes. Ismail later stated that jet lag from the trip to Japan was the cause for his exhaustion, not poor conditioning.

Ismail returned at PRIDE 15 with a win by arm triangle over Shungo Oyama. His next fight in PRIDE was a decision loss in a technical ground fight to Alex Stiebling at Pride 19. Ismail won the last two fights of his career in 2002 in Japan.

== Post fight career ==
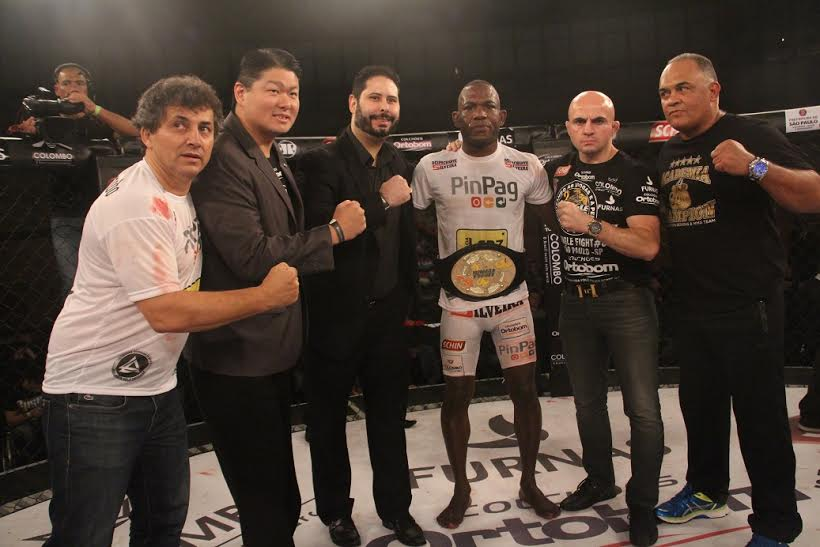
Ismail (second from the right) at Jungle Fight 88.

In 2003, Ismail did several special appearances for Japanese professional wrestling promotion New Japan Pro-Wrestling. Siding with Antonio Inoki and his faction of fighters opposed to NJPW, he was expected to debut as an active wrestler in August, teaming up with Kazuyuki Fujita and his allies. However, for unknown reasons, this never came to fruition, and he eventually remained in a non-wrestling role.

The same year, Ismail also proposed aggressively a rematch with Royce Gracie under mixed martial arts rules, criticizing Gracie as a "fake fighter."

Wallid also founded the Jungle Fight Championship promotion in Brazil, and was often in the corner of Paulo Thiago and Erick Silva in their UFC fights.

He became manager of multiple MMA fighters from Brazil, many which pass through Jungle Fight. He most notably manages former UFC Flyweight Champion Deiveson Figueiredo, strawweight Amanda Lemos and middleweight Paulo Costa. He also acts as an interpreter for the fighters who can't speak English that he manages, although his translations have caused controversy as he has made inaccurate translations or added his own thoughts and opinions on them.

In a May 2021 interview with Sherdog.com, Ismail said that UFC Middleweight Champion Israel Adesanya "has homosexual instincts and he should be studied by science". Adesanya had earlier caused controversy by simulating anal sex on a prone Paulo Costa, one of Ismail's fighters, after defeating Costa at UFC 253 in September 2020.

== Mixed martial arts record ==
Professional record breakdown
12 matches	9 wins	3 losses
By knockout	3	1
By submission	4	0
By decision	2	2

Res.	Record	Opponent	Method	Event	Date	Round	Time	Location	Notes
Win	9–3	Yasuhito Namekawa	Decision (unanimous)	Inoki Bom-Ba-Ye 2002	December 12, 2002	3	5:00	Saitama, Japan	
Win	8–3	Kazunari Murakami	TKO (punches)	UFO - Legend	August 8, 2002	2	3:03	Tokyo, Japan	
Loss	7–3	Alex Stiebling	Decision (unanimous)	PRIDE 19 - Bad Blood	February 24, 2002	3	5:00	Saitama, Japan	
Win	7–2	Shungo Oyama	Technical Submission (arm triangle choke)	PRIDE 15 - Raging Rumble	July 29, 2001	2	2:30	Saitama, Japan	
Loss	6–2	Akira Shoji	TKO (punches)	Pride 4	October 11, 1998	2	1:26	Tokyo, Japan	
Win	6–1	Gary Myers	Decision (unanimous)	IVC 5 - The Warriors	April 26, 1998	1	30:00	Brazil	
Win	5–1	Johil de Oliveira	Submission (punches)	IVC 3 - The War Continues	October 12, 1997	1	9:48	Brazil	
Loss	4–1	Kazuo Takahashi	Decision	UFC 12 - Judgement Day	February 2, 1997	1	15:00	Dothan, Alabama, United States	
Win	4–0	Katsumi Usuta	Submission (rear-naked choke)	U - Japan	November 17, 1996	1	3:10	Japan	
Win	3–0	Katsumi Usuta	Submission (rear-naked choke)	UVF 2 - Universal Vale Tudo Fighting 2	June 6, 1996	1	3:59	Brazil	
Win	2–0	Dennis Kefalinos	Submission (rear-naked choke)	UVF 1 - Universal Vale Tudo Fighting 1	May 4, 1996	1	2:10	Japan	
Win	1–0	Eugenio Tadeu	TKO (injury)	Desafio - Jiu Jitsu vs. Luta Livre	September 26, 1991	1	16:18	Grajaú, Rio de Janeiro, Brazil	

== Submission grappling record (incomplete) ==
Result	Opponent	Method	Event	Date	Round	Time	Notes
Win	(Brazil) Royce Gracie	Technical submission (clock choke)	Oscar de Jiu-Jitsu	1998			
Loss	(Brazil) Roberto Roleta	Points	World Championships	1996			
Win	(Brazil) Renzo Gracie	Points	Desafio WxR	1993			
Loss	(Brazil) Jean-Jacques Machado	Decision	Atlantico Sul	1991			

== See also ==
- Brazilian Jiu-Jitsu
- Jungle Fight
- New Japan Pro-Wrestling
- Paulo Thiago
