= Euclydes Hatem =

Brazilian martial artist

- Born: 16 September 1914; Rio de Janeiro, Brazil
- Died: September 26, 1984 (aged 70)
- Other names: Tatu
- Style: Luta Livre

Other information
- Notable students: Marco Ruas

Euclydes Hatem (Portuguese: [ewˈklidʒiʃ ˈʁatẽ]; September 16, 1914 – September 26, 1984), known as Mestre Tatu (Portuguese: [ˈmɛʃtɾi taˈtu]), was a Brazilian catch wrestler, known for being the founder of the martial art of Luta Livre.

== Biography ==
=== Early life ===
He was born into a Brazilian family of Lebanese origin. At 14 years old, after an unsuccessful career as a rower, Hatem started learning catch wrestling at the Associação de Cristã de Moços in Rio de Janeiro. From his childhood he received the nickname of "Tatu" ("armadillo") for his short, stocky build, which did not impede him from showing skill for the art. His main teacher was the legendary Orlando Americo da Silva or "Dudú", who also taught George Gracie and Hélio Gracie and defeated Geo Omori in a match.

=== Fighting career ===
After years of training, Euclydes turned professional and got into the fighting circuit of the time, which fluctuated between catch-as-catch-can and vale tudo. In 1935, after gaining success upon beating names like the Italian Attilio and the Brazilian Bogma, Euclyes took part in the first international wrestling championship held in Brazil, winning after submitting the veteran Kutter. Just one month after, Hatem (now known as "Mestre Tatu" or simply "Tatu") was pitted against a 300 lb wrestler nicknamed "Máscara Negra" ("Black Mask"). He lost the match after 40 minutes, but the audience left convinced of his talent, moreover for the fact that Máscara was suspected to be the famous Wladek Zbyszko. Hatem became known for his skill with chokeholds, to the point many opponents only fought him if this kind of move was forbidden.

In 1937 Tatu faced Japanese judoka Takeo Yano, Mitsuyo Maeda's colleague and Brazilian Navy's hand-to-hand instructor. Actually, Hatem and Yano had trained together before a match between Takeo and Hélio Gracie, but both left personal feelings outside the fight. Characteristically, Hatem won the match by choke. Yano requested a rematch and it took place after two months, but with the additional rule that Euclydes would have to wear a judogi. This rule gave the advantage to Yano, who won when his second attempted hip throw made Tatu take a bad fall and get his shoulder injured, turning an easy prey. Euclydes resumed competing after healing, moving to Porto Alegre to find more opponents. In another of his most known matches, he submitted Luiz Stock, who protested and demanded another round only to fall again to Hatem.

Three years later, Hatem participated in the Copa Mundial Benito Valladares, where the winner would face French wrestling champion Charles Ulsemer. Not only did Tatu win the qualifier, but he also drew with Ulsemer. They faced again two months after, and this time Euclydes won by armlock in a match refereed by Oswaldo Gracie. Tatu and Ulsemer became close friends after this result. Hatem continued moving through the land, taking part in an elite tournament in São Paulo where he would meet opponents like Richard Schikat, Tom Hanley, Henry Piers and Kola Kwariani. Unfortunately for Hatem, the tournament's ruleset forbade chokes, and he found himself losing matches by pinfall, but still the Brazilian press praised his effort and performance.

In 1942, Mestre Tatu returned to Porto Alegre to answer the challenge written down by George Gracie, a Brazilian jiu-jitsu exponent who had also trained in catch wrestling under Hatem's teachers. The match between them was celebrated to a great expectation, with Euclydes winning by rear naked choke at the second round. According to Brazilian historians such as Elton Silva, many people erroneously think he won the match via an Americana lock because of a newspaper picture from the match, but that picture was from the first round and George had managed to escape from that lock. Supposedly, he showed himself so dominant that Brazilian promoters dismissed the chance of a rematch, which Gracie didn't ask anyway.

After an unbeaten tour through Argentina in 1947, Hatem had a rubber match with his old enemy Takeo Yano, winning again by submission. The same year, Tatu was pitted against Russian superheavyweight Leon Falkenstein, nicknamed "Homem Montanha" ("Mountain Man") for his 330 ib and large height. Falkenstein had contacted Hatem to discuss the possibility of a worked match, but Euclydes refused, and negotiations got so heated that newspapers echoed them. However, when the match happened, Hatem defeated him in only 37 seconds. The Russian demanded a rematch after training with several vale tudo exponents, but results were again a victory by submission for Tatu.

=== Retirement ===
Tatu ended his career in the 1950s. After his retirement, he founded a gym and started teaching his fighting style of luta livre. Though he retired professionally, he didn't retire from fighting altogether; on one occasion, Valdemar Santana came to his gym to challenge him. Santana was immediately defeated by Hatem. After this, promoters proposed a fight between Tatu and Hélio Gracie, but the fight never happened, as Gracie demanded his opponent wear a gi and Hatem refused. Hatem focused himself on teaching, passing his knowledge to the brothers Carlos and Fausto Brunocilla until his death in 1984.
