= Luta Livre =

Brazilian martial art and combat sport

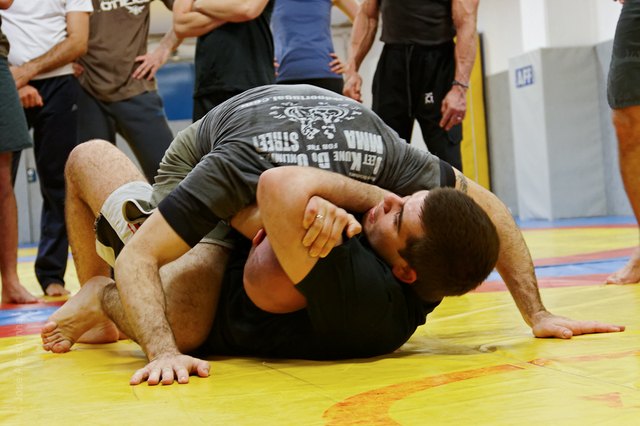
- Focus: Hybrid: Grappling (esportiva); Ground Striking (combate)
- Country of origin: Brazil
- Creator: Euclydes Hatem
- Famous practitioners: Alexandre Ferreira; Alexandre Franca Nogueira; Andreas Andyconda Schmidt; Darren Till; Eugenio Tadeu; Gesias Cavalcante; Glover Teixeira; Hugo Duarte; Johil de Oliveira; José Aldo; Marco Ruas; Micael Galvâo; Milton Vieira; Murilo Bustamante; Pedro Rizzo; Renato Sobral; Rousimar Palhares; Terry Etim; Vicente Luque; Luka Bradvica
- Parenthood: Catch Wrestling, Greco Roman Wrestling, Judo, Sambo
- Descendant arts: Vale Tudo, Mixed Martial Arts (MMA)
- Olympic sport: No

Luta Livre (Portuguese: [ˈlutɐ ˈlivɾi], lit. freestyle wrestling (Note: Although Luta Livre literally means "free fighting" in Portuguese, it is also a Portuguese term for "wrestling" in general.)), known in Brazil as Luta Livre Brasileira (lit. Brazilian freestyle wrestling) or Luta Livre Submission, and also Brazilian Submission Wrestling, is a Brazilian martial arts and combat sport created by Euclydes Hatem in Rio de Janeiro. Primarily a mixture of Catch Wrestling, Greco Roman Wrestling, Sambo and Judo, there is also ground striking with the hands, feet, knees and elbows. Notable practitioners include Marco Ruas, Ebenezer Fontes Braga, Johil de Oliveira, Alexandre Franca Nogueira, Renato Sobral, Gesias Cavalcante, Pedro Rizzo, Darren Till and José Aldo.

There are two styles: esportiva ("sporting") and combate ("ground strikes"). Both are no-gi. In esportiva competitions, grappling techniques are the only techniques allowed to subdue the opponent. Another style developed later is called "Luta Livre Vale Tudo", which is similar to the modern MMA style, which allows both standing and ground strikes and submissions. Consequently, it is important to calmly strategize and execute moves with the aim of forcing the opponent to submit via armlock, leglock, choke or necklock, or to win by points (i.e. takedowns, dominant position). Punches, kicks and other "hard" techniques are not allowed as this is considered more of a sport than actual combat. Combate, on the other hand, includes striking techniques on the ground; palm strikes and kicks are allowed, but ground fighting and submissions remain the largest elements. This is also the form used in MMA-style fights.

== Etymology ==
In Brazil, the name "Luta Livre" (lit. freestyle fighting) can be used for multiple styles of wrestling. Olympic Freestyle Wrestling is known as Luta Livre Olímpica (lit. olympic freestyle fighting), while Professional wrestling is called Luta Livre Profissional or simply Luta Livre, sometimes also referred to as Telecatch. Catch-as-Catch-Can wrestling was introduced to Brazil in the early 20th century and received the name "Luta Livre Americana" (lit. American freestyle fighting) to differentiate from Greco-Roman wrestling (Portuguese: Luta Greco-Romana), as there were no forbidden holds or moves, thus "livre" ("free"). Later, due to the influence of Euclydes Hatem and other practitioners, Luta Livre started to diverge from Catch Wrestling (which was becoming predetermined professional wrestling) and became its own style of submission grappling, with its practitioners maintaining the moniker of "Luta Livre".

To clear the confusion, in the modern day some Luta Livre schools have adopted the name of "Luta Livre Submission" while others use "Luta Livre Esportiva" in order to differentiate from other similarly named fighting styles.

== History ==
Luta Livre's founder is credited to Euclydes "Tatu" Hatem, who was originally a catch wrestler. Catch-as-catch-can arrived in the early 20th century in Brazil where it received the moniker "Luta Livre Americana" (lit. American freestyle fighting) or simply "Luta Livre". Similar to overseas, catch wrestlers held public matches and spectacles, which were known as Espetáculos de Catch or Espetáculos de Luta Livre. The rules varied considerably between events, but in general (though not always) matches were referred to as catch when pinning an opponent's shoulders to the mat counted as a victory, and as luta livre when victory could be achieved only by submission. They were often worked matches, known as in Brazil as "marmeladas", alongside legitimate contests, referred to as "lutas no duro".

Euclydes Hatem went by the name of "Tatu" ("Armadillo"). He began teaching catch wrestling techniques in Rio de Janeiro in 1927 while experimenting with his own innovative techniques. Tatu brought on many challenges with Brazilian jiu-jitsu, culminating in his victory over George Gracie in 1942 in a Catch rules fight. Receiving a lot popularity when he submitted Gracie, and when one of his students, Euclides Pereira, defeated Carlson Gracie in 1968. The system focused on ground fighting and submissions due to their importance in Vale Tudo matches. The ground fighting included the use of leg locks, which at the time were ignored by Brazilian Jiu-Jitsu. However, unlike its origins in catch wrestling, Luta Livre did not incorporate pinning the opponent's shoulders to the mat as a means of victory, instead emphasizing submission holds.

Some famous fighters who came out of Luta Livre included William Porfirio. In the 1970s, Luta Livre was strongly influenced by the father and son duo Fausto and Carlos Brunocilla. The Brunocilla were Tatu's pupils and, in turn, were responsible for graduating many Luta Livre Masters. Also, around the 1970s, the art of Luta Livre was influenced by Roberto Leitão, a practitioner of judo and wrestling. Leitão also articulated the "Theory of Grappling", sometimes referred to as "Theory of Luta Livre". Roberto Leitão was a university professor of Engineering who had devoted many years to Wrestling and Judo.

=== Luta Livre and Brazilian jiu-jitsu ===
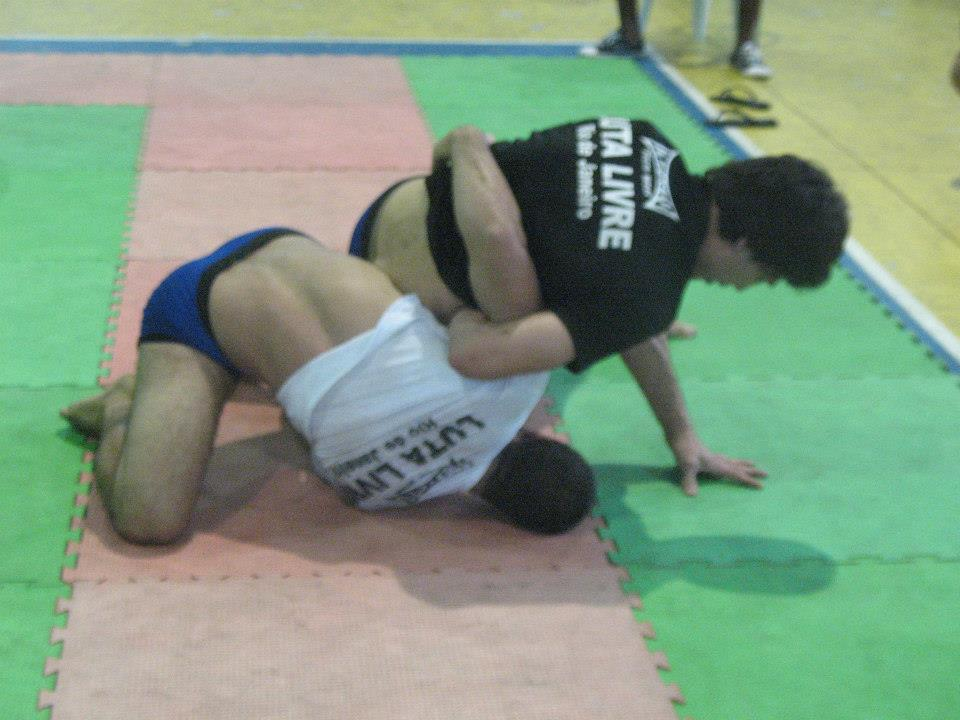
A Luta Livre demonstration.

Luta Livre, in its early days, was largely considered to be an art "for poor kids who could not afford a gi." Due to appearances, since they didn't fight with a gi. Luta Livre and BJJ were considered to be enemies. When Euclides Perreria beat Carlson Gracie in 1968, the rivalry was continued for a few more decades. It was actually very popular amongst kids from the favelas, and in a way, it represented a class divide and "warfare" between social classes. By the 1980s, Gracie Jiu-Jitsu had become very popular in Brazil, and Luta Livre representatives wanted to help popularize their art by accepting challenges from Brazilian jiu-jitsu champions in Vale Tudo and Submission matches. Luta Livre continued on with many famous fights in and out of the ring. This included a fight with Rickson Gracie on the beaches of Brazil. This would hurt Luta Livre's reputation with Hugo Duarte losing to Rickson Gracie, then getting knocked out by Tank Abbott at UFC 17, and Eugenio Tadeu losing to Wallid Ismael due to his inability to re-enter the ring in time. Tadeu did battle Royler Gracie to a draw in an indoor fight. Another fight between Renzo Gracie and Eugenio Tadeu kept the rivalry going. His battle with Renzo Gracie in 1997 ended in a No Contest due to fans rioting. In 1991 Desafio hosted a Jiu-Jitsu vs Luta Livre card that had three representatives of Brazilian jiu-jitsu up against three representatives of Luta Livre, with BJJ winning all three fights. One fighter, Marco Ruas, who would later become a UFC champ, had a huge rivalry with Rickson Gracie. A fight, though, never occurred between the two fighters.

=== Decline in popularity and modern development ===
While the feud between BJJ and Luta Livre was ongoing, BJJ started to gain the upper hand by spreading its art across Brazil and the rest of the world, something Luta Livre wasn't doing due to a lack of central leadership or interest in doing so. A branch of the Gracie family, which established itself in the United States, did a Vale Tudo-style tournament in the form of the Ultimate Fighting Championship, which saw the early events resulting in the victory of Jiu-Jitsu practitioners and raising the awareness of the art across the globe. While Luta Livre kept its popularity limited to the Rio de Janeiro and Manaus areas. As many events similar to the UFC were created in Brazil, the United States and Japan, Luta Livre practitioners responded by signing up for those Vale Tudo and MMA events nationally and abroad. Marco Ruas was one of the first, becoming the champion of UFC 7; however; he was billed representing "Ruas Vale Tudo", his own fighting style, which Luta Livre only composed a part of. Other Luta Livre fighters followed suit, including Hugo Duarte, Pedro Otávio, Johil de Oliveira and Eugenio Tadeu, and they found mixed results in competitions. However, the main blow was that, as the nascent sport professionalized, most of the earlier, most prestigious MMA academies (Brazilian Top Team, Chute Boxe Academy, Nova União, among others) used Brazilian Jiu-Jitsu as their submission grappling style. Many Luta Livre fighters left their original camps and moved to Jiu-Jitsu camps, hoping to succeed in their fighting careers. BJJ practitioners also stopped using the jiu-jitsu gi in MMA competitions (which would later be banned outright) and developed a style of BJJ without the gi, known as "No-Gi". Thus, eliminating one of the main differentials between the two martial arts, and since many Luta Livre fighters were now practicing this new style, many of No-Gi's techniques and strategies were heavily influenced by Luta Livre.

Currently, there has been a lot of work to preserve Luta Livre and work towards a resurgence of the style. In 2017, the Confederação Brasileira de Luta Livre Esportiva (Brazilian Confederation of Luta Livre Esportiva) was founded in order to better organize and promote the sport. While it has also carved itself a niche in Europe, especially in Germany, where Luta Livre schools are common. Luta Livre was introduced in that country by Daniel D'Dane.

== Ranking ==
The Brazilian Luta Livre Federation created a curriculum and a grading system similar to the Brazilian jiu-jitsu ranking system and the Brazilian Judo ranking system, in order to develop uniform minimum standards and better rank its practitioners. A black belt might take up to ten years of practice. Although it's a no-gi grappling style, practitioners can wear their belts if they want.

According to the Brazilian Luta Livre Federation, Rankings are divided into three categories: beginners, intermediate and advanced. Advanced students are allowed to be instructors

Beginners
White
Yellow
Orange
Intermediate
Blue
Advanced
Purple
Brown
Black (1st to 9th dan)
Red-and-white (10th dan black belt)
