= List of Pride Fighting Championships records =

Below is a list of records held in the Pride Fighting Championships.

== Fighting ==
=== Most bouts ===
#	Fighter	Bouts	Pride record
1	(Brazil) Wanderlei Silva	28	22–4–2
2	(Japan) Kazushi Sakuraba	27	18–8–1
2	(Ukraine) Igor Vovchanchyn	27	18–8–1
4	(Croatia) Mirko Cro Cop	24	18–4–2
5	(Japan) Akira Shoji	23	9–12–2

=== Most total fight time ===
#	Fighter	Fights	Time
1	(Japan) Kazushi Sakuraba	27	7 hours 15 mins
2	(Japan) Akira Shoji	23	4 hours 58 mins
3	(Ukraine) Igor Vovchanchyn	27	4 hours 55 mins
4	(Brazil) Wanderlei Silva	28	4 hours 40 mins
5	(Japan) Daijiro Matsui	15	4 hours 32 mins

=== Most knockouts ===
#	Fighter	KOs
1	(Brazil) Wanderlei Silva	15
2	(Croatia) Mirko Cro Cop	14
3	(Ukraine) Igor Vovchanchyn	10
4	(Brazil) Maurício Rua	9
5	(United States) Dan Henderson	8

=== Most submissions ===
#	Fighter	SUBs
1	(Japan) Kazushi Sakuraba	11
1	(Brazil) Antônio Rodrigo Nogueira	11
3	(Russia) Fedor Emelianenko	7
4	(Japan) Hidehiko Yoshida	6
5	(United States) Heath Herring	5

=== Most decision wins ===
#	Fighter	Decision wins
1	(Japan) Kazuhiro Nakamura	7
2	(Ukraine) Igor Vovchanchyn	6
2	(Brazil) Wanderlei Silva	6
4	(United States) Dan Henderson	5
4	(Brazil) Antônio Rodrigo Nogueira	5
4	(Brazil) Ricardo Arona	5

== Winning ==
=== Most wins ===
#	Fighter	Wins
1	(Brazil) Wanderlei Silva	22
2	(Japan) Kazushi Sakuraba	18
2	(Ukraine) Igor Vovchanchyn	18
2	(Croatia) Mirko Cro Cop	18
5	(Brazil) Antônio Rodrigo Nogueira	17

=== Most consecutive wins ===
#	Fighter	Began	Ended	Winning Streak
1	(Japan) Takanori Gomi	Feb 15, 2004	Dec 31, 2005	10
2	(Russia) Fedor Emelianenko	Jun 23, 2002	Aug 15, 2004	8
2	(Brazil) Paulo Filho	Sep 29, 2002	Nov 5, 2006	8
2	(Brazil) Maurício Rua	Oct 5, 2003	Aug 28, 2005	8
5	(Brazil) Antônio Rodrigo Nogueira	Jul 29, 2001	Dec 23, 2002	7
5	(Brazil) Antônio Rogério Nogueira	Apr 28, 2002	Apr 23, 2005	7
5	(Brazil) Mirko Cro Cop	May 23, 2004	Jun 26, 2005	7

=== Longest undefeated streak ===
#	Fighter	Began	Ended	Streak
1	(Brazil) Wanderlei Silva	Sep 12, 1999	Oct 31, 2004	20
2	(Russia) Fedor Emelianenko	Jun 23, 2002	Never ended	15
3	(Japan) Takanori Gomi	Feb 15, 2004	Dec 31, 2005	10
4	(Brazil) Paulo Filho	Sep 29, 2002	Nov 5, 2006	8
4	(Brazil) Maurício Rua	Oct 5, 2003	Aug 28, 2005	8

== See also ==
- Pride Fighting Championships
- List of MMA records
