= 2000 in Pride FC =

Mixed martial arts events

Information
- First date: January 30, 2000
- Last date: December 23, 2000

Events
- Total events: 6

Fights
- Total fights: 53

Chronology
1999 in Pride	2000 in Pride FC	2001 in Pride

The year 2000 was the 4th year in the history of the Pride Fighting Championships, a mixed martial arts promotion based in Japan. 2000 had 6 events beginning with, Pride FC - Grand Prix 2000: Opening Round.

== Debut Pride FC fighters ==
The following fighters fought their first Pride FC fight in 2000:

- Dan Henderson
- Gilbert Yvel
- Hans Nijman
- Heath Herring
- Herman Renting
- Igor Borisov
- Johil de Oliveira
- John Marsh
- John Renken
- Kazuyuki Fujita
- Ken Shamrock
- Masaaki Satake
- Mike Bourke
- Osamu Kawahara
- Ricardo Almeida
- Ricco Rodriguez
- Royce Gracie
- Ryan Gracie
- Shannon Ritch
- Takayuki Okada
- Tokimitsu Ishizawa
- Tra Telligman
- Willie Peeters
- Yoshiaki Yatsu

== Events list ==
#	Event	Japanese name	Date held	Venue	City	Attendance
14	Pride 12 - Cold Fury	—N/a	December 23, 2000	Saitama Super Arena	Saitama, Japan	26,882
13	Pride 11 - Battle of the Rising Sun	—N/a	October 31, 2000	Osaka-jo Hall	Osaka, Japan	13,500
12	Pride 10 - Return of the Warriors	—N/a	August 27, 2000	Seibu Dome	Saitama, Japan	35,000
11	Pride 9 - New Blood	—N/a	June 4, 2000	Nagoya Rainbow Hall	Nagoya, Japan	—N/a
10	Pride FC - Pride Grand Prix 2000: Finals	—N/a	May 1, 2000	Tokyo Dome	Tokyo, Japan	38,429
9	Pride FC - Pride Grand Prix 2000: Opening Round	—N/a	January 30, 2000	Tokyo Dome	Tokyo, Japan	48,316

== Pride FC: Grand Prix 2000 - Opening Round ==
Pride: Grand Prix 2000 - Opening Round
- Promotion: Pride Fighting Championships
- Date: January 30, 2000
- Venue: Tokyo Dome
- City: Tokyo
- Attendance: 48,316

Event chronology
Pride 8	Pride: Grand Prix 2000 - Opening Round	Pride: Grand Prix 2000 - Finals

Pride FC - Grand Prix 2000: Opening Round was an event held on January 30, 2000 at The Tokyo Dome in Tokyo, Japan.

=== Results ===
Openweight Opening Round
Weight class				Method	Round	Time	Notes
Openweight	(Brazil) Royce Gracie	def.	(Japan) Nobuhiko Takada	Decision (Unanimous)	1	15:00
Openweight	(Japan) Kazushi Sakuraba	def.	(United States) Guy Mezger	TKO (forfeit)	1	15:00	(Note: Mezger forfeited the fight by leaving the ring after the bout was declared a draw and sent to an overtime round.)
Openweight	(Ukraine) Igor Vovchanchyn	def.	(Japan) Alexander Otsuka	Decision (Unanimous)	1	15:00
Openweight	(Trinidad and Tobago) Gary Goodridge	def.	(Japan) Osamu Kawahara	Submission (forearm choke)	1	0:51
Openweight	(United States) Mark Coleman	def.	(Japan) Masaaki Satake	Submission (neck crank)	1	1:14
Openweight	(Japan) Akira Shoji	def.	(Brazil) Ebenezer Fontes Braga	Decision (Unanimous)	1	15:00
Openweight	(United States) Mark Kerr	def.	(Japan) Enson Inoue	Decision (Majority)	1	15:00
Openweight	(Japan) Kazuyuki Fujita	def.	(Netherlands) Hans Nijman	Submission (scarf hold)	1	2:48
Alternate Bout
Openweight	(Brazil) Wanderlei Silva	def.	(Netherlands) Bob Schrijber	Submission (rear-naked choke)	1	2:42

=== Pride 2000 Grand Prix Bracket ===
Opening Round; January 30, 2000
(Brazil) Royce Gracie	UD
(Japan) Nobuhiko Takada	15:00
(Japan) Kazushi Sakuraba	TKO
(United States) Guy Mezger	15:00
(Ukraine) Igor Vovchanchyn	UD
(Japan) Alexander Otsuka	15:00
(Trinidad and Tobago) Gary Goodridge	SUB
(Japan) Osamu Kawahara	0:51
(United States) Mark Coleman	SUB
(Japan) Masaaki Satake	1:14
(Japan) Akira Shoji	UD
(Brazil) Ebenezer Fontes Braga	15:00
(United States) Mark Kerr	MD
(Japan) Enson Inoue	15:00
(Japan) Kazuyuki Fujita	SUB
(Netherlands) Hans Nijman	2:48

Quarter-finals; May 1, 2000
(Brazil) Royce Gracie
(Japan) Kazushi Sakuraba
(Ukraine) Igor Vovchanchyn
(Trinidad and Tobago) Gary Goodridge
(United States) Mark Coleman
(Japan) Akira Shoji
(United States) Mark Kerr
(Japan) Kazuyuki Fujita

Semi-finals; May 1, 2000
(Japan) Kazushi Sakuraba
(Ukraine) Igor Vovchanchyn
(United States) Mark Coleman
(Japan) Kazuyuki Fujita

Final; May 1, 2000
(Ukraine) Igor Vovchanchyn
(United States) Mark Coleman

== Pride FC: Grand Prix 2000 - Finals ==
Pride: Grand Prix 2000 - Finals
- Promotion: Pride Fighting Championships
- Date: May 1, 2000
- Venue: Tokyo Dome
- City: Tokyo
- Attendance: 38,429

Event chronology
Pride: Grand Prix 2000 - Opening Round	Pride: Grand Prix 2000 - Finals	Pride 9

Pride FC - Pride Grand Prix 2000: Finals was an event held on May 1, 2000 at The Tokyo Dome in Tokyo, Japan.

=== Results ===
Openweight final
Weight class				Method	Round	Time	Notes
Openweight	(United States) Mark Coleman	def.	(Ukraine) Igor Vovchanchyn	TKO (Submission to knees)	2	3:09	(Note: Coleman won the Pride Grand Prix 2000 tournament and the $200,000 grand prize.)
Superfight
Superfight	(United States) Ken Shamrock	def.	(Japan) Alexander Otsuka	KO (punches)	1	9:43	(Note: Pride Grand Prix 2000 Superfight Finals.)
Openweight Semi-finals
Openweight	(Ukraine) Igor Vovchanchyn	def.	(Japan) Kazushi Sakuraba	TKO (corner stoppage)	1	15:00
Openweight	(United States) Mark Coleman	def.	(Japan) Kazuyuki Fujita	TKO (corner stoppage)	1	0:02	(Note: Fujita's corner threw in the towel immediately due to injuries suffered in his quarterfinal bout against Mark Kerr.)
Openweight Quarter-finals
Openweight	(Ukraine) Igor Vovchanchyn	def.	(Trinidad and Tobago) Gary Goodridge	TKO (punches)	1	10:14
Openweight	(Japan) Kazushi Sakuraba	def.	(Brazil) Royce Gracie	TKO (corner stoppage)	6	15:00	(Note: The rules were modified to allow unlimited rounds. After 90 minutes of fighting, Gracie could not continue due to damage suffered to his legs.)
Openweight	(United States) Mark Coleman	def.	(Japan) Akira Shoji	Unanimous decision	1	15:00
Openweight	(Japan) Kazuyuki Fujita	def.	(United States) Mark Kerr	Unanimous decision	1	15:00
Other
	(United States) Guy Mezger	def.	(Japan) Masaaki Satake	Unanimous decision	2	15:00

=== Pride 2000 Grand Prix Bracket ===
Opening Round; January 30, 2000
(Brazil) Royce Gracie	UD
(Japan) Nobuhiko Takada	15:00
(Japan) Kazushi Sakuraba	TKO
(United States) Guy Mezger	15:00
(Ukraine) Igor Vovchanchyn	UD
(Japan) Alexander Otsuka	15:00
(Trinidad and Tobago) Gary Goodridge	SUB
(Japan) Osamu Kawahara	0:51
(United States) Mark Coleman	SUB
(Japan) Masaaki Satake	1:14
(Japan) Akira Shoji	UD
(Brazil) Ebenezer Fontes Braga	15:00
(United States) Mark Kerr	MD
(Japan) Enson Inoue	15:00
(Japan) Kazuyuki Fujita	SUB
(Netherlands) Hans Nijman	2:48

Quarter-finals; May 1, 2000
(Brazil) Royce Gracie	90:00
(Japan) Kazushi Sakuraba	TKO
(Ukraine) Igor Vovchanchyn	TKO
(Trinidad and Tobago) Gary Goodridge	10:14
(United States) Mark Coleman	UD
(Japan) Akira Shoji	15:00
(United States) Mark Kerr	15:00
(Japan) Kazuyuki Fujita	UD

Semi-finals; May 1, 2000
(Japan) Kazushi Sakuraba	15:00
(Ukraine) Igor Vovchanchyn	TKO
(United States) Mark Coleman	TKO
(Japan) Kazuyuki Fujita	0:02

Final; May 1, 2000
(Ukraine) Igor Vovchanchyn	3:09
(United States) Mark Coleman	SUB

== Pride 9: New Blood ==
Pride 9
- Promotion: Pride Fighting Championships
- Date: June 4, 2000
- Venue: Nippon Gaishi Hall
- City: Nagoya

Event chronology
Pride Grand Prix 2000 Finals	Pride 9	Pride 10

Pride 9 - New Blood was an event held on June 4, 2000 at The Nagoya Rainbow Hall in Nagoya, Japan.

=== Results ===
Main Card
Weight class				Method	Round	Time	Notes
	(United States) Heath Herring	def.	(Netherlands) Willie Peeters	submission (rear-naked choke)	1	0:48
	(Brazil) Carlos Barreto	def.	(United States) Tra Telligman	unanimous decision	2	10:00
	(Brazil) Allan Goes	def.	(United States) Vernon White	unanimous decision	2	10:00
	(Canada) Carlos Newton	def.	(Japan) Naoki Sano	submission (armbar)	1	0:40
	(Japan) Akira Shoji	def.	(United States) John Renken	submission (armbar)	1	6:44
	(United States) Ricco Rodriguez	def.	(Trinidad and Tobago) Gary Goodridge	unanimous decision	2	10:00
	(Ukraine) Igor Vovchanchyn	def.	(Japan) Daijiro Matsui	TKO (doctor stoppage)	1	5:03
	(Brazil) Vitor Belfort	def.	(Netherlands) Gilbert Yvel	unanimous decision	2	10:00

== Pride 10: Return of the Warriors ==
Pride 10
- Promotion: Pride Fighting Championships
- Date: August 27, 2000
- Venue: Seibu Dome
- City: Saitama
- Attendance: 38,429

Event chronology
Pride 9	Pride 10	Pride 11

Pride 10 - Return of the Warriors was an event held on August 27, 2000 at The Seibu Dome in Saitama, Japan.

=== Results ===
Main Card
Weight class				Method	Round	Time	Notes
	(Japan) Kazushi Sakuraba	def.	(Brazil) Renzo Gracie	technical submission (kimura)	2	9:43	(Note: Gracie dislocated his elbow during the fight.)
	(Brazil) Ryan Gracie	def.	(Japan) Tokimitsu Ishizawa	KO (punches)	1	2:16
	(Japan) Kazuyuki Fujita	def.	(United States) Ken Shamrock	TKO (corner stoppage)	1	6:46
	(Japan) Masaaki Satake	def.	(Japan) Kazunari Murakami	TKO (punches)	1	6:58
	(Ukraine) Igor Vovchanchyn	def.	(United States) Enson Inoue	TKO (doctor stoppage)	1	10:00
	(United States) Mark Kerr	def.	(Russia) Igor Borisov	submission (neck crank)	1	2:06
	(Netherlands) Gilbert Yvel	def.	(Trinidad and Tobago) Gary Goodridge	KO (head kick)	1	0:28
	(United States) Ricco Rodriguez	def.	(Japan) Takayuki Okada	submission (smother choke)	1	6:04
	(Brazil) Wanderlei Silva	def.	(United States) Guy Mezger	KO (punches)	1	3:40
	(Brazil) Vitor Belfort	def.	(Japan) Daijiro Matsui	unanimous decision	2	10:00

== Pride 11: Battle of the Rising Sun ==
Pride 11
- Promotion: Pride Fighting Championships
- Date: October 31, 2000
- Venue: Osaka-jo Hall
- City: Osaka
- Attendance: 13,500

Event chronology
Pride 10	Pride 11	Pride 12

Pride 11 - Battle of the Rising Sun was an event held on October 31, 2000 at Osaka-jo Hall in Osaka, Japan.

=== Results ===
Main Card
Weight class				Method	Round	Time	Notes
	(Japan) Kazushi Sakuraba	def.	(United States) Shannon Ritch	Submission (Achilles Lock)	1	1:08
	(Japan) Naoya Ogawa	def.	(Japan) Masaaki Satake	Submission (Rear-Naked Choke)	2	2:01
	(Ukraine) Igor Vovchanchyn	def.	(Japan) Nobuhiko Takada	TKO (Submission to Punches)	2	3:17
	(Japan) Akira Shoji	def.	(Netherlands) Herman Renting	Submission (Armbar)	1	3:48
	(Japan) Alexander Otsuka	def.	(United States) Mike Bourke	Submission (Double Armbar)	1	2:37
	(Trinidad and Tobago) Gary Goodridge	def.	(Japan) Yoshiaki Yatsu	TKO (Punches)	1	8:58
	(Brazil) Wanderlei Silva	vs.	(Netherlands) Gilbert Yvel	No Contest (Yvel Kicked in Groin)	1	0:21
	(United States) Heath Herring	def.	(United States) Tom Erikson	Submission (Rear-Naked Choke)	1	6:17

== Pride 12: Cold Fury ==
Pride 12
- Promotion: Pride Fighting Championships
- Date: December 23, 2000
- Venue: Saitama Super Arena
- City: Saitama
- Attendance: 26,882

Event chronology
Pride 11	Pride 12	Pride 13

Pride 12 - Cold Fury was an event held on December 23, 2000 at The Saitama Super Arena in Saitama, Japan. This event featured the debut of future PRIDE Champion, Dan Henderson.

=== Results ===
Main Card
Weight class				Method	Round	Time	Notes
	(Japan) Kazushi Sakuraba	def.	(Brazil) Ryan Gracie	Decision (Unanimous)	1	10:00
	(Ukraine) Igor Vovchanchyn	def.	(United States) Mark Kerr	Decision (Unanimous)	3	5:00
	(Japan) Kazuyuki Fujita	def.	(Netherlands) Gilbert Yvel	Decision (Unanimous)	2	10:00
	(Brazil) Wanderlei Silva	def.	(United States) Dan Henderson	Decision (Unanimous)	3	5:00
	(United States) Heath Herring	def.	(United States) Enson Inoue	TKO (Knees)	1	4:52
	(Brazil) Ricardo Almeida	def.	(Japan) Akira Shoji	Decision (Unanimous)	2	10:00
	(United States) Ricco Rodriguez	def.	(United States) John Marsh	Decision (Unanimous)	2	10:00
	(Canada) Carlos Newton	def.	(Brazil) Johil de Oliveira	Decision (Unanimous)	2	10:00
	(United States) Guy Mezger	def.	(Japan) Alexander Otsuka	TKO (Punches)	1	1:52

== See also ==
- Pride Fighting Championships
- List of Pride Fighting Championships champions
- List of Pride Fighting events
