= Igor Vovchanchyn =

Ukrainian kickboxer and mixed martial arts fighter (born 1973)

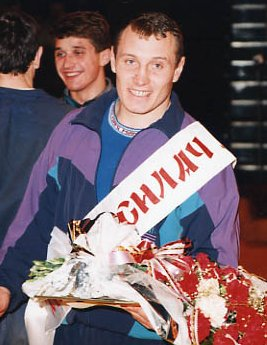
- A 22-year-old Vovchanchyn in the Mr. Strongman Sekai
- Born: August 6, 1973 (age 53); Zolochiv, Kharkiv Oblast, Ukrainian SSR, Soviet Union
- Native name: Ігор Вовчанчин
- Other names: Ice Cold
- Nationality: Ukrainian
- Height: 5 ft 8 in (173 cm)
- Weight: 229 lb (104 kg; 16 st 5 lb)
- Division: Light Heavyweight; Heavyweight
- Reach: 68 in (173 cm)
- Style: Kickboxing, wrestling, sambo, boxing
- Stance: Orthodox
- Fighting out of: Kharkiv, Ukraine
- Team: Team Vovchanchyn
- Years active: 1995–2005 (MMA)

Kickboxing record
- Total: 63
- Wins: 61
- By knockout: 48
- Losses: 2

Mixed martial arts record
- Total: 68
- Wins: 56
- By knockout: 41
- By submission: 7
- By decision: 8
- Losses: 10
- By knockout: 3
- By submission: 4
- By decision: 3
- Draws: 1
- No contests: 1

Other information
- Mixed martial arts record from Sherdog
- Last updated on: February 10, 2011

Igor Yaroslavovych Vovchanchyn (vov-CHUN-chin, Ukrainian: Ігор Ярославович Вовчанчин; born August 6, 1973) is a retired Ukrainian mixed martial artist and kickboxer, who competed in early no holds barred MMA contests. After making his professional MMA debut in 1995, he won nine openweight mixed martial arts tournaments (back when tournament format required 3 to 4 consecutive bare-knuckle fights during the same night) and 3 superfights. As of July 2024, Vovchanchyn holds the longest unbeaten streak in MMA history (at 40 fights, shared with Travis Fulton) and is the second most successful MMA fighter ever by number of wins achieved by way of knockout. Vovchanchyn has an MMA tournament named after him, the Igor Vovchanchyn Cup.

As a kickboxer, Vovchanchyn won the IAKSA World Kickboxing (Full Contact) title in Denmark in 1993 and Commonwealth of Independent States (CIS) kickboxing championship in 1994.

== Biography ==
The son of Klavdiya Michaylovna and Yaroslav Iosifovich Vovchanchyn, Igor Yaroslavovych Vovchanchyn was born in the settlement of Fesky, in the Zolochivsky district of Soviet Ukraine. Vovchanchyn said that growing up, he caused trouble and got into street fights and different kinds of mischief. Due to his antics, there was a popular story in circulation that whenever Vovchanchyn became upset the villagers would ring a bell in the center of town which would alarm everyone to stay in their houses until he had calmed down. Vovchanchyn later stated that this story was just a joke, although there was a bell in the center of town. At age 17, he moved to Kharkiv and began competing in track and field, running the 100m dash and throwing the discus. Due to his love for fighting, he later moved to boxing under trainer Oleg Ermakov. In 1993, he met Eugenia Borschevskaya, general secretary of the All Eurasian Kickboxing Federation. After taking up kickboxing, he later went to Denmark to compete at the World Kickboxing Amateur Championships with the Ukrainian national team, where he became the world champion that same year. Vovchanchyn also won the Commonwealth of Independent States (CIS) kickboxing championship in 1994.

== Mixed martial arts career ==
=== Early career ===
==== Honour of the Warrior ====
In late 1995, Vovchanchyn transitioned from a successful kickboxing career to MMA after being invited to participate at Honour of the Warrior in Kharkiv, Ukraine. In this 8-man tournament, Vovchanchyn knocked out his first two opponents before losing via submission to Ukrainian Sambist/Kickboxer Andrey Besedin in the final.

==== International Absolute Fighting Council ====
He then fought a month later in a 32-man tournament held at Moscow's Luzhniki Palace of Sports, performing impressively at the inaugural International Absolute Fighting Council event, where he TKO'd Sergei Akinen before defeating Adilson Lima, a Gracie Jiu Jitsu black belt who trained with Ryan Gracie. Vovchanchyn won by knockout via soccer kick 56 seconds into the fight, but Lima's cornerman Renzo Gracie argued to the tournament organisers, complaining that kicks to a downed opponent were unfair and demanded an instant rematch. Unusually, an immediate rematch was granted, and the fight began again only to be stopped a second time after Lima's nose was broken by a punch, giving Vovchanchyn the win by TKO. Vovchanchyn advanced to the quarterfinal, in which he was submitted by Russian sambo champion Mikhail Ilyukhin.

==== Mr. Strongman SEKAI ====
With his dominant kickboxing style, Vovchanchyn became famed for being one of the few strictly stand-up fighters to overcome grappling-based opponents, exemplified in his victory in the 8-man Mr. Strongman Sekai tournament in Minsk, Belarus on January 23, 1996, where he knocked out three opponents.

==== March 1996 ====
In March 1996, Vovchanchyn fought in and won 3 different tournaments: the DNRF: Ukrainian Octagon, the UCMAL: Ukrainian No Rules Championship, and the first ever IFC event: IFC 1: Kombat in Kyiv. Across these three tournaments, he won nine fights (seven KO/TKOs and two submissions) with none of them going past the first round. At the IFC tournament, all three men he faced in the same night (Fred Floyd, Paul Varelans and John Dixon) weighed over 300 pounds/136 kilograms. The fight against Paul Varelans was considered one of the greatest fights in European MMA history. In attendance at this event, was former heavyweight boxing champion Leon Spinks, who was a 'guest of honor'.

==== UFC Invitation ====
Vovchanchyn was invited to fight at UFC 11 in September 1996, but could not participate due to visa issues as well as dissatisfaction with the offer.

==== Subsequent victories ====
Having achieved much success competing in the former Soviet Union, Vovchanchyn then won the 1st Absolute Fighting World Cup Pankration tournament in Tel Aviv, Israel on 12 November 1997. In the tournament final, Vovchanchyn faced Nick Nutter, an NCAA All-American Wrestler from Ohio State and a protégé of Mark Coleman. Nutter dominated the fight for approximately 25 minutes, until he was stunned by a head butt from Vovchanchyn. Bleeding heavily, Nutter submitted.

==== World Vale Tudo Championship ====
As a seven-time winner of various tournaments, Vovchanchyn was invited to compete in the fifth edition of the World Vale Tudo Championship (WVC), organised by Brazilian promoter Frederico Lapenda and hosted by the Fun House Night Club in Recife, northeast Brazil on 3 February 1998. The event featured an elimination tournament of eight fighters – three Americans, four Brazilians, and Vovchanchyn as the sole Ukrainian representative – without gloves and with 10-minute rounds. After forcing Chinese boxing stylist Tulio Palhares to submit to strikes in the quarterfinals, Vovchanchyn was scheduled to face Patrick Smith at the semifinal stage. Smith withdrew, however, after breaking his hand against Marco Selva, and he was replaced by local fighter Elias Rodrigues, also known as Demonio Negro ("Black Devil"). In a back-and-forth encounter that lasted over ten minutes, Vovchanchyn and Rodrigues traded strikes, although the Ukrainian was able to score four takedowns. In one of these opportunities, Vovchanchyn mounted Rodrigues and forced his Brazilian opponent to submit to a barrage of punches. Advancing to the final, he faced the American wrestler Nick Nutter in a rematch and scored a brutal 14-second knockout when he countered a takedown attempt with a well-timed knee strike.

Vovchanchyn won eight MMA tournaments during this stage of his career, and was considered arguably the best heavyweight in the world for several years to come. He returned to the WVC the following year, knocking out Edson Carvalho, a member of the Brazilian national judo team and a Carlson Gracie black belt. Carvalho was a disciple of Sebastião "Master of Death" Lacerda, a wealthy man from the north of Brazil who appeared in Rio de Janeiro in 1996 claiming to have spent a long period of time in Japan learning "the deadly art of yawara." Despite his dubious credentials, Lacerda was able to recruit some established competitors into his sect, including Carvalho and Marco Ruas. While Ruas ultimately parted ways with Lacerda, Carvalho continued to challenge other fighting styles on behalf of Lacerda and his "deadly technique" of yawara.

=== PRIDE FC ===
==== Early PRIDE career ====
After winning at World Vale Tudo Championship 5, Vovchanchyn was invited to Japanese promotion PRIDE, fighting Gary Goodridge in his debut. Vovchanchyn was taken down twice by the larger Goodridge and was left behind on points, but he dominated Goodridge during the stand-up exchanges and knocked him out with two left hooks, 5:58 into the first round.

Vovchanchyn returned to the World Vale Tudo Championship, winning two superfights against Aloisio Freitas Neto and Edson Carvalho.

Once again in PRIDE, Vovchanchyn then fought Japanese fighter Akira Shoji. Most of the fight stayed in the standing position, with Vovchanchyn damaging a wary Shoji and throwing him down, while the Japanese circled him and lay on the mat to avoid his hits. At the end Vovchanchyn won the judges' decision by damaging Shoji badly with strikes.

In what was Vovchanchyn's last venture for some time outside of PRIDE, he participated in another 4-man tournament called 'InterPride' in his home country of Ukraine, winning the first fight via TKO and the final by submission.

Coming back to PRIDE, he fought Carlos "Carlão" Barreto, a Carlson Gracie team member and reigning IVC Heavyweight Champion. Despite the greater height of Barreto, Vovchanchyn countered him with punches and leg kicks and shut down his takedown attempts for the first two rounds, but action was slow and often saw Barreto as the most active fighter. In overtime they traded hits and Barreto managed to take Vovchanchyn down, ending the fight working ground and pound on him. The decision was given to Vovchanchyn, which was met with a certain controversy.

After the Barreto match, Vovchanchyn made a special appearance in K-1 for a kickboxing rules match, facing multiple champion and established star Ernesto Hoost. The format hindered Vovchanchyn, who often found himself going for takedowns, while Hoost kept attacking his left leg with low kicks. At the end, the Ukrainian fighter fell down three times due to the damage to his leg, which cost him the match by knockout.

===== Unofficial #1 Heavyweight Superfight =====
Vovchanchyn was next matched up with American wrestler Mark Kerr for the unofficial title of #1 heavyweight in the world. Nearly all outlets that covered mixed martial arts considered either Vovchanchyn or the unbeaten two-time UFC Champion and ADCC Champion Mark Kerr as the best heavyweight fighter in the world. Early in the fight, Kerr cut Vovchanchyn with a knee strike to the right eye and secured several takedowns, but he was unable to pass Vovchanchyn's guard or do any more significant damage. In the last round, Vovchanchyn pounced on the now-exhausted Kerr and dominated him with strikes, eventually knocking him out with a series of knees. Vovchanchyn was declared the winner, but the result was later overturned and the result declared a no contest. Knees to the head of a grounded opponent in the four points position had been banned just prior to the event. This fight was also the first time Vovchanchyn's manager, Eugenia Borschevskaya, was seen in his corner.

===== Bueno knockout =====
In his next fight, Vovchanchyn fought Brazilian jiu-jitsu master Francisco Bueno. Vovchanchyn knocked Bueno out with a vicious combination, Bueno literally falling face first as he was being punched in the face. The knockout is to this day considered one of the most brutal knockouts in the history of MMA – it even prompted the promoters of K-1 to give Vovchanchyn $1,000 cash in the locker room and propose that he fought K-1 Champion Ernesto Hoost. After this string of victories, Vovchanchyn became a huge favorite going into the Pride Grand Prix 2000.

==== PRIDE Openweight Grand Prix 2000 ====
Vovchanchyn had been considered the top fighter in the sport for some years, and as commentators Stephen Quadros and Bas Rutten stated, he was likely the favorite to win the tournament. In the opening round he defeated Japanese professional wrestler Alexander Otsuka by decision and, in a rematch with Gary Goodridge, decisively won by knockout in an entirely stand-up fight. He reached the final of the PRIDE 2000 Openweight Grand Prix.

Vovchanchyn then faced the number one pound for pound fighter in the world, Kazushi Sakuraba of Japan, who had beaten Royce Gracie earlier that night in a 90-minute bout, the longest in recent competitive fighting history. Though Sakuraba took him down and punched him, Vovchanchyn eventually grabbed a waist lock takedown and controlled the Japanese with strikes while Sakuraba covered up. After the fight was declared a draw and needed a second round to determine a finalist, Sakuraba's corner threw in the towel as he had just fought for 105 minutes and could not physically continue. Vovchanchyn won the fight via TKO (corner stoppage) and advanced to the last round.

Vovchanchyn met powerhouse American wrestler Mark Coleman in the final. Coleman had the advantage, coming into the final match, as he bypassed the semi-finals after his opponent, Kazuyuki Fujita, retired due to injury. Coleman kept the visibly tired Igor on the ground, and during the second 20-minute round, finished the fight by gaining a north-south position and repeatedly kneed Vovchanchyn the head, forcing Vovchanchyn to tap out. Igor later said that Coleman was the toughest opponent he faced up to that point.

==== Post Grand Prix ====
Facing Japanese gatekeeper Daijiro Matsui at PRIDE 9, Vovchanchyn controlled the bout by sprawling and performing ground and pound on him, until the fight was stopped by eye damage on Matsui.

Vovchanchyn then fought Enson Inoue at PRIDE 10 in what was one of the most one sided fights in MMA history, which resulted in a doctor stoppage after the end of the 1st round. Inoue later recounted of the fight, "I sustained a broken jaw, fractured finger, perforated eardrum, swollen brain, a liver count 2000x the normal person and spent 2 days in intensive care." Vovchanchyn then faced off against Nobuhiko Takada at PRIDE 11, who was the trainer of Sakuraba and Matsui. Vovchanchyn was taken down and met leg kicks and some resistance, but he finished him on the second round via ground and pound.

After three straight victories, Vovchanchyn received a rematch with Mark Kerr at PRIDE 12. Vovchanchyn's advantage in the stand up fighting was countered by Kerr's superior grappling and takedowns, and the fight was ruled a draw after two rounds. After an extra, third round, Vovchanchyn was awarded the victory via unanimous decision. Igor cited both of his fights against Mark Kerr as the most difficult wins of his career.

==== PRIDE decline ====
===== 2001 =====
Although he was scheduled to face Ken Shamrock at Pride 13, Vovchancyn faced Tra Telligman, as Shamrock had sustained a neck injury 2 weeks prior to the fight. Despite Igor being able to counterstrike, Telligman surprised him with a left straight which knocked Vovchanchyn down, allowing Tra control the rest of the fight and win the decision. This was the first time Vovchanchyn had been out-struck.

He later faced another feared striker, former RINGS Openweight champion Gilbert Yvel at PRIDE 14. However, sensing Gilbert was weaker than him on the ground, Vovchanchyn took him down, putting his sambo skills to use and choking Yvel out.

Vovchanchyn would go to defeat another striker, beating world karate champion Masaaki Satake by decision at PRIDE 15.

In PRIDE 17, Vovchanchyn suffered another upset when was submitted in under three minutes by Brazilian Top Team trainer Mario Sperry. After this bout, he was invited to fight at the RINGS promotion, in Lithuania. Vovchanchyn's original opponent pulled out of the event with an injury, and was replaced by a fighter who "hadn't fought for quite a while". This fighter requested that no punches be allowed in the fight, which Igor said was difficult to avoid, but won via leg kicks in the second round.

He ended the year on a high note; showing great grappling expertise against Valentijn Overeem at PRIDE 18, escaping from heel hook attempts and slipping his own heel hook for the tap out, ending 2001 with a mixed record in PRIDE – going 3–2.

===== 2002–2003 =====
At the start of 2002, Vovchanchyn considered moving down to the Middleweight (205lb) division, and stated he thought he had a good chance to become a champion in that weight class. This move did not happen, and he faced Heath Herring at PRIDE 19, struggling in a fight which saw both grappling and striking from the two men, but after Herring accidentally headbutted Vovchanchyn at the third round, he was controlled by him, and judges gave the decision to Heath. Fighting Quinton Jackson would be similarly unfortunate for Vovchanchyn, as the American fighter slammed him twice, getting him submitted due to injury at PRIDE 22.

After beating Bob Schrijber by submission in a Dutch promotion, Vovchanchyn faced off against Mirko Cro Cop in August 2003. Igor was knocked out via left head kick. This fight is considered a 'passing of the torch', as Vovchanchyn had split his last 8 fights in Pride with a record of 3–5 (1–3 in his last 4), and it elevated the newer striking sensation Cro Cop into an Interim Heavyweight Championship fight with Antônio Rodrigo Nogueira.

==== 2004 ====
Starting off the year strong, Vovchanchyn defeated former King of the Cage Super Heavyweight champion Dan Bobish and was announced as one of the participants of PRIDE's upcoming 16-man heavyweight Grand Prix, but withdrew due to injury. After healing, Vovchanchyn went on to fight Katsuhisa Fujii and Sergey Terezimov, Winning against the former by knock out and the latter via Heel hook submission.

==== Drop to Middleweight (93 kg) ====
In 2005, Vovchanchyn moved down a weight division - beating former Pancrase Heavyweight champion Yoshiki Takahashi. Takahashi said after the fight, "I've never been knocked out by a single punch until today, I'm still dizzy and have [a] headache." After this victory, he entered PRIDE's 2005 Middleweight Grand Prix. PRIDE commentator Bas Rutten believed that Vovchanchyn was a favorite to win the tournament.

===== PRIDE Middleweight Grand Prix 2005 =====
Vovchanchyn was matched against Yuki Kondo - the reigning Pancrase Light Heavyweight champion and former two-time Pancrase Openweight champion – in PRIDE Total Elimination 2005. Vovchanchyn controlled the fight, winning a unanimous decision.

He then fought Alistair Overeem in the quarter-finals and lost via submission. Vovchanchyn received a second chance to progress when offered a fight against Kazuhiro Nakamura in PRIDE Final Conflict 2005, with the winner earning the right to be an alternate in the finals of the tournament. After 15 minutes, Vovchanchyn lost a unanimous judges' decision in what would be his last competitive MMA fight.

On his move down to the Middlweight division, Vovchanchyn said, "It's all about training. I was 93 kg only for the last two years in PRIDE when they introduced weight divisions. But actually my natural weight is around 103-104 kg. Losing weight I didn't feel myself as strong as before. But 104 kg is the best weight for me and I am really comfortable about it. I felt strong, powerful, full of energy. Due to losing weight I felt lack of self-confidence. By the way the same goes for Fedor (Emelianenko), when he lost the weight, he felt out of his comfort zone. It's not about the shape and visual muscular performance but it was not his style." Regarding Vovchanchyn's weight, popular nutritionist Mike Dolce stated that he wished he could've helped Vovchanchyn drop to the 170 lb weight-class and make him the 'welterweight Fedor'. Some experts say that Vovchanchyn ideally should have fought at the Welterweight (183) division that PRIDE had, and that he was an undersized heavyweight.

=== Retirement ===
Although he was rumored to fight at PRIDE 34 against Wanderlei Silva, Vovchanchyn retired at age 32, citing multiple injuries, including a right hand that remained seriously affected as of 2008. It has been speculated that due to this injury, his last few performances in his career were passive. He finished his career in PRIDE with a record of 18–8 with 1 no contest, having the second most bouts in PRIDE history (27), second most wins in PRIDE history, and third most wins via KO/TKO (10). Vovchanchyn is considered one of MMA's hardest punchers, one of the best fighters in history to have never competed in the UFC, one of the greatest European mixed martial artists ever, and one of the best mixed martial artists of the 1990s. He was a top 10 heavyweight from April 1996 to January 2001 according to FightMatrix. In 2011 and in 2017, Vovchanchyn received several votes on Sherdog's 'MMA's All-Time Heavyweights' list.

==== Potential return to MMA ====
In July 2009, Vovchanchyn was linked to making his return in MMA at the Fighting Mixed Combative event in South Korea, which was scheduled for September 29, 2009. Although Jan Nortje was rumored to be his opponent, Vovchanchyn had just stated one year prior that he had no interest in fighting due to his injuries. The event took place and Igor did not appear on the card.

In September 2016, Rizin Fighting Federation CEO Nobuyuki Sakakibara posted several photos on his Instagram account, showing Vovchanchyn training in his gym back in Ukraine – even hinting that he may invite Igor back to fight in Japan.

== Fighting style ==
Primarily a striker, Vovchanchyn based his MMA game around his punching power, which made him one of the most devastating strikers of his time. His kickboxing used a pattern of looping punches, among them the Russian hook, and he specialized in an aggressive counterpunching style to make up for his short reach. Vovchanchyn also displayed significant grappling skills, using his sambo background, and would work a vicious ground and pound offense with short and hard strikes from the top. He was able to surprise many with his defensive guard and dexterity on the ground despite being known primarily as a striker, and displayed this ability against submission fighters such as Carlos Barreto, Mark Kerr and Valentijn Overeem among others.

Despite his small size, Vovchanchyn was known for his toughness and strength, leading Nobuhiko Takada to call him a "strongman". Vovchanchyn would later state that his punching power and fighting skills came naturally, not because of the martial arts, even though martial arts helped him along the way. He also never invited any famous fighters to spar and train with him as he did not see the point in copying their styles. He trained with many of the same coaches his entire career. Vovchanchyn was known to take on any challenger, despite size or rules, even fighting in prison when he was not even a prisoner himself.

== Personal life ==
Vovchanchyn is married and has one son named Daniel Kret, and lives in Toronto, Canada.

In a 2008 interview, Vovchanchyn stated that since retiring from competition he runs a local café-bar called 'Champion'. He also runs an MMA gym for Ukrainian youth in Kharkiv.

Vovchanchyn took a pro-Ukrainian stance since the beginning of the Russo-Ukrainian war in 2014, stating that "year 2014 made it clear for me who the Russians are and in what way we, Ukrainians, are different. After the 24 February 2022, the rift between us became huge". In the aftermath of the full-scale Russian invasion of Ukraine, Vovchanchyn set up a foundation that helps and supports Ukrainian Armed Forces, as well as civilians in the Kharkiv oblast.

== Championships and accomplishments ==
=== Mixed martial arts ===
- Ukrainian Combat Martial Arts League
  - Honour of the Warrior Runner-up (1995)
  - Ukrainian No Rules Championship Champion (1996)
- Mr. Strongman SEKAI
  - Mr. Strongman SEKAI Champion (1996)
- Donetsk No Rules Fighting
  - Ukrainian Octagon Champion (1996)
  - Ukrainian Octagon 2 Champion (1996)
- International Fighting Championship
  - International Fighting Championship 1 Champion (1996)
- International Absolute Fighting Council
  - 1st Absolute Fighting World Cup Pankration Champion (1997)
  - Absolute Fighting Championship 2 Superfight Champion (1997)
  - Absolute Fighting Russian Open Cup 3 Champion (1997)
- World Vale Tudo Championship
  - World Vale Tudo Championship 5 Tournament Champion
  - WVC 6 Super Fight Champion (one time)
  - WVC 7 Super Fight Champion (one time)
- InterPride
  - InterPride 1999: Heavyweight Final Champion (1999)
- PRIDE Fighting Championship
  - 2000 PRIDE Openweight Grand Prix runner-up
  - Tied (Kazushi Sakuraba) for second Most bouts in PRIDE FC history (27) (behind Wanderlei Silva)
  - Tied (Kazushi Sakuraba & Mirko Cro Cop) for second most wins in PRIDE FC history (18) (behind Wanderlei Silva)
  - Third most knockouts in PRIDE FC history (10)
  - Third most total fight time in PRIDE FC history (4 hours 55 mins)
  - Tied (Wanderlei Silva) for second most decision wins in PRIDE FC history (6)

=== Kickboxing ===
63 fights, 61 wins, 2 losses

- World Kickboxing Amateur Championships winner - Denmark (1993)
- Commonwealth of Independent States (CIS) Kickboxing Champion (1994)

== Mixed martial arts record ==
Professional record breakdown
67 matches	56 wins	10 losses
By knockout	41	3
By submission	7	4
By decision	8	3
No contests	1	

Res.	Record	Opponent	Method	Event	Date	Round	Time	Location	Notes
Loss	56–10 (1)	Kazuhiro Nakamura	Decision (unanimous)	PRIDE Final Conflict 2005	August 28, 2005	2	5:00	Saitama, Japan	PRIDE 2005 Middleweight Grand Prix Reserve Bout.
Loss	56–9 (1)	Alistair Overeem	Submission (standing guillotine choke)	PRIDE Critical Countdown 2005	June 26, 2005	1	1:25	Saitama, Japan	PRIDE 2005 Middleweight Grand Prix Quarterfinal.
Win	56–8 (1)	Yuki Kondo	Decision (unanimous)	PRIDE Total Elimination 2005	April 23, 2005	3	5:00	Osaka, Japan	PRIDE 2005 Middleweight Grand Prix Opening Round.
Win	55–8 (1)	Yoshiki Takahashi	KO (punch)	Pride 29: Fists of Fire	February 20, 2005	1	1:10	Saitama, Japan	Middleweight (205 lbs.) debut.
Win	54–8 (1)	Sergey Terezimov	Submission (heel hook)	WOP: Water of Peresvit	December 4, 2004	1	1:35	Kyiv, Ukraine	
Win	53–8 (1)	Katsuhisa Fujii	KO (punches)	Pride Bushido 5	October 14, 2004	1	4:02	Osaka, Japan	
Win	52–8 (1)	Dan Bobish	TKO (punches)	Pride 27: Inferno	February 1, 2004	2	1:45	Osaka, Japan	
Loss	51–8 (1)	Mirko Cro Cop	KO (head kick)	PRIDE Total Elimination 2003	August 10, 2003	1	1:29	Saitama, Japan	
Win	51–7 (1)	Bob Schrijber	Submission (rear-naked choke)	It's Showtime 2003 Amsterdam	June 8, 2003	2	4:05	Amsterdam, Netherlands	
Loss	50–7 (1)	Quinton Jackson	TKO (injury)	Pride 22: Beasts from the East 2	September 29, 2002	1	7:17	Nagoya, Japan	
Loss	50–6 (1)	Heath Herring	Decision (unanimous)	Pride 19: Bad Blood	February 24, 2002	3	5:00	Saitama, Japan	
Win	50–5 (1)	Valentijn Overeem	Submission (heel hook)	Pride 18: Cold Fury 2	December 23, 2001	1	4:35	Fukuoka, Japan	
Win	49–5 (1)	Ricardas Rocevicius	TKO (leg kicks)	RINGS Lithuania: Bushido Rings 3	November 10, 2001	2	N/A	Vilnius, Lithuania	
Loss	48–5 (1)	Mario Sperry	Submission (arm-triangle choke)	Pride 17: Championship Chaos	November 3, 2001	1	2:52	Tokyo, Japan	
Win	48–4 (1)	Masaaki Satake	Decision (unanimous)	Pride 15: Raging Rumble	July 29, 2001	3	5:00	Saitama, Japan	
Win	47–4 (1)	Gilbert Yvel	Submission (rear-naked choke)	Pride 14: Clash of the Titans	May 27, 2001	1	1:52	Yokohama, Japan	
Loss	46–4 (1)	Tra Telligman	Decision (unanimous)	Pride 13: Collision Course	March 25, 2001	3	5:00	Saitama, Japan	
Win	46–3 (1)	Mark Kerr	Decision (unanimous)	Pride 12: Cold Fury	December 9, 2000	3	5:00	Saitama, Japan	
Win	45–3 (1)	Nobuhiko Takada	TKO (submission to punches)	Pride 11: Battle of the Rising Sun	October 31, 2000	2	5:17	Osaka, Japan	
Win	44–3 (1)	Enson Inoue	TKO (doctor stoppage)	Pride 10: Return of the Warriors	August 27, 2000	1	10:00	Tokyo, Japan	
Win	43–3 (1)	Daijiro Matsui	TKO (doctor stoppage)	Pride 9: New Blood	June 4, 2000	1	5:03	Nagoya, Japan	
Loss	42–3 (1)	Mark Coleman	TKO (submission to knees)	PRIDE Grand Prix 2000 Finals	May 1, 2000	2	3:09	Tokyo, Japan	PRIDE FC 2000 Openweight Grand Prix Final.
Win	42–2 (1)	Kazushi Sakuraba	TKO (corner stoppage)	PRIDE Grand Prix 2000 Finals	May 1, 2000	1	15:00	Tokyo, Japan	PRIDE FC 2000 Openweight Grand Prix Semifinal.
Win	41–2 (1)	Gary Goodridge	TKO (punches)	PRIDE Grand Prix 2000 Finals	May 1, 2000	1	10:14	Tokyo, Japan	PRIDE FC 2000 Openweight Grand Prix Quarterfinal.
Win	40–2 (1)	Alexander Otsuka	Decision (unanimous)	PRIDE Grand Prix 2000 Opening Round	January 30, 2000	1	15:00	Tokyo, Japan	PRIDE FC 2000 Openweight Grand Prix Opening Round.
Win	39–2 (1)	Francisco Bueno	KO (punches)	Pride 8	November 21, 1999	1	1:23	Tokyo, Japan	
NC	38–2 (1)	Mark Kerr	NC (overturned)	Pride 7	September 12, 1999	2	N/A	Yokohama, Japan	Originally a TKO (knees) win for Vovchanchyn; later overturned to a no contest when the knees were deemed illegal.
Win	38–2	Carlos Barreto	Decision (split)	Pride 6	July 4, 1999	3	5:00	Yokohama, Japan	
Win	37–2	Vepcho Bardanashvili	Submission (guillotine choke)	InterPride 1999: Heavyweight Final	May 8, 1999	1	N/A	Kharkiv, Ukraine	Won the InterPride 1999: Heavyweight Tournament.
Win	36–2	Vladimir Solodovnik	TKO (punches)	InterPride 1999: Heavyweight Final	May 8, 1999	1	N/A	Kharkiv, Ukraine	
Win	35–2	Akira Shoji	Decision (unanimous)	Pride 5	April 29, 1999	2	10:00	Nagoya, Japan	
Win	34–2	Edson Carvalho	TKO (punches)	WVC 7: World Vale Tudo Championship 7	February 2, 1999	1	3:16	Brazil	Won the WVC 7: World Vale Tudo Championship 7 Superfight.
Win	33–2	Aloisio Freitas Neto	TKO (submission to punches)	WVC 6: World Vale Tudo Championship 6	November 1, 1998	1	7:26	Brazil	Won the WVC 6: World Vale Tudo Championship 6 Superfight.
Win	32–2	Gary Goodridge	TKO (punches)	Pride 4	October 11, 1998	1	5:58	Tokyo, Japan	
Win	31–2	Nick Nutter	KO (knee)	WVC 5: World Vale Tudo Championship 5	February 3, 1998	1	0:14	Recife, Brazil	Won the WVC 5: World Vale Tudo Championship 5 Tournament.
Win	30–2	Elias Rodrigues	TKO (submission to headbutt and punches)	WVC 5: World Vale Tudo Championship 5	February 3, 1998	1	10:35	Recife, Brazil	
Win	29–2	Tulio Palhares	TKO (submission to punches)	WVC 5: World Vale Tudo Championship 5	February 3, 1998	1	5:35	Recife, Brazil	
Win	28–2	Nick Nutter	TKO (submission to headbutts)	IAFC - 1st Absolute Fighting World Cup Pankration	November 12, 1997	1	24:42	Tel Aviv, Israel	Won the IAFC - 1st Absolute Fighting World Cup Pankration.
Win	27–2	Mikhail Avetisyan	Decision (split)	IAFC - 1st Absolute Fighting World Cup Pankration	November 12, 1997	1	35:00	Tel Aviv, Israel	Opponent was an alternate for the injured Vasily Kudin.
Win	26–2	Valery Pliev	TKO (submission to punches)	IAFC - 1st Absolute Fighting World Cup Pankration	November 12, 1997	1	7:13	Tel Aviv, Israel	
Win	25–2	Yuri Mildzikhov	TKO (forfeit)	IAFC: Absolute Fighting Russian Open Cup 3	August 29, 1997	1	N/A	Luzhniki Sports Palace, Moscow, Russia	
Win	24–2	Igor Guerus	TKO (punches)	IAFC: Absolute Fighting Russian Open Cup 3	August 29, 1997	1	N/A	Luzhniki Sports Palace, Moscow, Russia	
Win	23–2	Vasily Kudin	TKO (submission to leg kicks)	IAFC: Absolute Fighting Russian Open Cup 3	August 29, 1997	1	9:11	Luzhniki Sports Palace, Moscow, Russia	Won the IAFC: Absolute Fighting Russian Open Cup 3.
Win	22–2	Dimitry Panfilov	TKO (punches)	COS: Cup of Stars	May 23, 1997	1	N/A	Odesa, Ukraine	Vovchanchyn withdrew from the tournament due to injury.
Win	21–2	Aslan Hamza	KO (knee)	COS: Cup of Stars	May 23, 1997	1	N/A	Odesa, Ukraine	
Win	20–2	Leonardo Castello Branco	Decision (split)	IAFC: Absolute Fighting Championship II [Day 2]	May 2, 1997	1	35:00	Luzhniki Sports Palace, Moscow, Russia	Won the Absolute Fighting Championship II Superfight.
Win	19–2	Sergei Bondarenko	TKO (punches)	Disco 2000 No Rules Championship	November 30, 1996	1	N/A	Kharkiv, Ukraine	
Win	18–2	Igor Akhmedov	Submission (choke)	DNRF: Ukrainian Octagon 2	May 1, 1996	1	N/A	Donetsk, Ukraine	
Win	17–2	John Dixson	TKO (exhaustion)	IFC 1: Kombat in Kyiv	March 30, 1996	1	9:10	Kyiv, Ukraine	Won the IFC 1: Kombat in Kyiv Tournament.
Win	16–2	Paul Varelans	KO (punches)	IFC 1: Kombat in Kyiv	March 30, 1996	1	6:20	Kyiv, Ukraine	
Win	15–2	Fred Floyd	TKO (submission to strikes)	IFC 1: Kombat in Kyiv	March 30, 1996	1	13:14	Kyiv, Ukraine	
Win	14–2	Igor Akhmedov	Submission (arm-triangle choke)	UCMAL: Ukrainian No Rules Championship 1996	March 9, 1996	1	N/A	Kyiv, Ukraine	Won the UCMAL: Ukrainian No Rules Championship 1996.
Win	13–2	Yuri Zhernikov	TKO (punches)	UCMAL: Ukrainian No Rules Championship 1996	March 9, 1996	1	N/A	Kyiv, Ukraine	
Win	12–2	Matrosov Matrosov	TKO (punches)	UCMAL: Ukrainian No Rules Championship 1996	March 9, 1996	1	N/A	Kyiv, Ukraine	
Win	11–2	Igor Guerus	TKO (punches)	DNRF: Ukrainian Octagon	March 1, 1996	1	1:41	Donetsk, Ukraine	Won the DNRF: Ukrainian Octagon Tournament.
Win	10–2	Sergey Sheremet	KO (punch)	DNRF: Ukrainian Octagon	March 1, 1996	1	1:27	Donetsk, Ukraine	
Win	9–2	Oleg Tischenko	KO (punch)	DNRF: Ukrainian Octagon	March 1, 1996	1	0:05	Donetsk, Ukraine	
Win	8–2	Roman Tikunov	KO (punch)	MPS 1996: Mr. Strongman SEKAI 1996	January 23, 1996	1	2:21	Minsk, Belarus	Won the Mr. Strongman SEKAI 1996 Tournament.
Win	7–2	Sergei Bondarovich	KO (head kick)	MPS 1996: Mr. Strongman SEKAI 1996	January 23, 1996	1	2:27	Minsk, Belarus	
Win	6–2	Nikolai Yatsuk	KO (punch)	MPS 1996: Mr. Strongman SEKAI 1996	January 23, 1996	1	1:50	Minsk, Belarus	
Loss	5–2	Mikhail Ilyukhin	Submission (chin to the eye)	IAFC: Absolute Fighting Championship I: Tournament	November 25, 1995	1	6:30	Luzhniki Sports Palace, Moscow, Russia	
Win	5–1	Adilson Lima	TKO (corner stoppage)	IAFC: Absolute Fighting Championship I: Tournament	November 25, 1995	1	1:51	Luzhniki Sports Palace, Moscow, Russia	
Win	4–1	Adilson Lima	KO (soccer kicks)	IAFC: Absolute Fighting Championship I: Tournament	November 25, 1995	1	0:56	Luzhniki Sports Palace, Moscow, Russia	Lima's team disputed referee's neglection of excessive soccer kicks to the head of the downed opponent, governing body representative ruled to hold rematch after a brief medical break.
Win	3–1	Sergei Akinen	TKO (arm injury)	IAFC: Absolute Fighting Championship I: Tournament	November 25, 1995	1	2:40	Luzhniki Sports Palace, Moscow, Russia	
Loss	2–1	Andrei Besedin	Submission (kneebar)	UCMAL: Warrior's Honour 1	October 14, 1995	1	1:12	Kharkiv, Ukraine	
Win	2–0	Sergei Bondarovich	TKO (punches)	UCMAL: Warrior's Honour 1	October 14, 1995	1	0:18	Kharkiv, Ukraine	
Win	1–0	Alexander Mandrik	TKO (submission to punches)	UCMAL: Warrior's Honour 1	October 14, 1995	1	3:06	Kharkiv, Ukraine	

== Kickboxing record (incomplete) ==
Kickboxing record (Incomplete)
61 wins (48 (T)KOs), 2 losses
Date	Result	Opponent	Event	Location	Method	Round	Time	Record
July 18, 1999	Loss	(Netherlands) Ernesto Hoost	K-1 Dream '99	Nagoya, Japan	TKO (low kicks/3 knockdowns)	3	0:51	61–2
Legend: Win Loss Draw/no contest
