= Kazuhiro Hamanaka =

Japanese mixed martial arts fighter

- Born: October 24, 1978 (age 47); Tokyo, Japan
- Nationality: Japanese
- Height: 6 ft 0 in (1.83 m)
- Weight: 185 lb (84 kg; 13.2 st)
- Division: Middleweight
- Style: MMA; Hybrid martial arts
- Team: Takada Dojo

Mixed martial arts record
- Total: 13
- Wins: 5
- By knockout: 1
- By submission: 2
- By decision: 1
- By disqualification: 1
- Losses: 7
- By knockout: 5
- By submission: 2
- Draws: 1

Other information
- Mixed martial arts record from Sherdog

Kazuhiro Hamanaka (Japanese: 浜中 和宏, Hamanaka Kazuhiro; born October 24, 1978) is a Japanese mixed martial artist. He fought for the Tokyo Sabres in the International Fight League.

== Career ==
Hamanaka began his mixed martial arts career in 2003 with a victory over Antonio Schembri at PRIDE 26. After losing to Ryan Gracie in PRIDE Bushido 1, he made stints in other organizations such as K-1. Over his mixed martial arts career, Hamanaka has trained with IFL coaches Matt Lindland and Dan Henderson, as well as UFC legend Randy Couture. Kazuhiro currently resides in Tokyo.

== Mixed martial arts record ==
Professional record breakdown
13 matches	5 wins	7 losses
By knockout	1	5
By submission	2	2
By decision	1	0
By disqualification	1	0
Draws	1	

Res.	Record	Opponent	Method	Event	Date	Round	Time	Location	Notes
Loss	5–7–1	Shunsuke Inoue	TKO (punches)	Pancrase: Changing Tour 6	October 25, 2009	1	0:52	Tokyo, Japan	
Win	5–6–1	Alavutdin Gadjiev	DQ (illegal knee)	GCM - Cage Force & Valkyrie	July 12, 2009	3	1:04	Tokyo, Japan	
Loss	4–6–1	Karl Amoussou	KO (flying knee)	M-1 Challenge 14: Japan	April 29, 2009	1	0:23	Tokyo, Japan	
Loss	4–5–1	Matt Horwich	KO (head kick)	IFL-Everett	June 1, 2007	1	2:07	Everett, Washington, United States	
Loss	4–4–1	Jeremy Williams	TKO (triangle choke)	IFL-Los Angeles	March 17, 2007	1	0:59	Los Angeles, California, United States	
Loss	4–3–1	Alex Schoenauer	Submission (guillotine choke)	IFL-Portland	September 9, 2006	1	1:04	Portland, Oregon, United States	
Win	4–2–1	Yoichi Babaguchi	Submission (kimura)	Hero's 5	May 3, 2006	1	1:22	Tokyo, Japan	
Win	3–2–1	Wesley Correira	Submission (kimura)	ROTR 9-Rumble on the Rock 9	April 21, 2006	2	1:53	Honolulu, Hawaii, United States	
Loss	2–2–1	Wilson Gouveia	TKO (punches)	Euphoria-USA vs. Japan	November 5, 2005	1	0:39	Atlantic City, New Jersey, United States	
Draw	2–1–1	Yukiya Naito	Draw	GCM-D.O.G. 3	September 17, 2005	2	5:00	Tokyo, Japan	
Win	2–1	Webster Dauphiney	KO	NJPW-Los Angeles Dojo Show	June 26, 2004	2	0:40	Los Angeles, California, United States	
Loss	1–1	Ryan Gracie	TKO (soccer kicks)	PRIDE Bushido 1	October 5, 2003	1	7:37	Saitama, Japan	
Win	1–0	Nino Schembri	Decision (unanimous)	PRIDE 26	June 8, 2003	3	5:00	Yokohama, Japan	
