= Carlos Barreto (fighter) =

Brazilian mixed martial artist (born 1968)

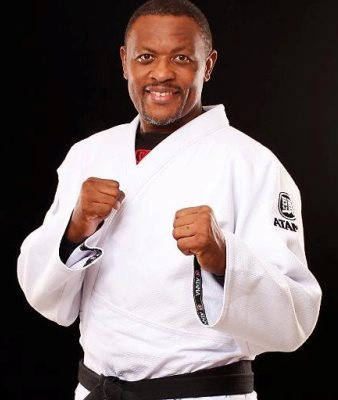
- Born: 22 July 1968 (age 58); Rio de Janeiro, Brazil
- Other names: Carlão
- Height: 6 ft 4 in (193 cm)
- Weight: 230 lb (104 kg; 16 st 6 lb)
- Division: Heavyweight (265 lb)
- Style: Vale Tudo, Muay Thai, Brazilian Jiu-Jitsu
- Fighting out of: Rio de Janeiro, Brazil
- Team: Brazilian Top Team
- Rank: 2nd degree black belt in Brazilian Jiu-Jitsu
- Years active: 1996-2005

Mixed martial arts record
- Total: 23
- Wins: 14
- By knockout: 8
- By submission: 5
- By decision: 1
- Losses: 9
- By knockout: 2
- By decision: 7

Other information
- Mixed martial arts record from Sherdog

Carlos Barreto (born 22 July 1968) is a retired Brazilian mixed martial arts fighter, BJJ coach, and Black House founder who was trained by the legendary Carlson Gracie. A veteran of both the UFC and Pride Fighting Championships, Barreto holds notable wins over Ben Rothwell, Kevin Randleman and Dan Bobish. He won the IVC Heavyweight Championship in 1999.

== Background ==
Barreto trained in Muay Thai as a teenager. After meeting Ricardo Liborio, he began attending jiu-jitsu training at the Carlson Gracie academy.

== Grappling ==
Barreto took part in 1999 ADCC World Championships and lost to Mark Kerr. Next year he took part in 2000 ADCC World Championships and lost to Sean Alvarez in absolute weight category and lost to Ricco Rodriguez in +99 weight category.

== MMA ==
Barreto made his MMA debut in 1996 and won experienced Russian fighter Mikhail Ilyukhin. In 1996 he took part in Universal Vale Tudo Fighting 6 grand prix. He won Dan Bobish in semifinal, and Kevin Randleman in final. After that tournament he made his UFC debut and took part in UFC 15 4 fighters heavyweight tournament. He was defeated by Dave Beneteau. After victoires over Branden Lee Hinkle and Pedro Otavio Barreto Barreto met Igor Vovchanchyn at Pride 6 and loss fight by split decision. After defeating Gary Myers he fought second time in Pride and defeated Tra Telligman via TKO. In 2000 he made his debut in Rings and lost to Chris Haseman. 2001 -st year was not successful, Barreto lost fights to Gilbert Yvel and Ian Freeman. In 2002 Barreto hold victories over Marcelo Souza and Ben Rothwell. Then he met Travis Wiuff and loss fight. Next opponent was Bobby Hoffman and Barreto won that fight. After three consecutive loss Barreto retired from competition.

== Black House (MMA) ==
Carlos Barreto along with Ed Soares, Jorge Guimaraes, Rogerio Camoes founded Black House gym in 2006. Black House offers classes in Brazilian Jiu-Jitsu, Muay Thai and Boxing . UFC champions Anderson Silva, Lyoto Machida, José Aldo, Junior dos Santos, Glover Teixeira trained in Black House.

== Personal life ==
After retirement Barreto worked as coach, fight analyst and tried himself as a promoter. In 2023, Barreto began working as a member of the commentary team for UFC Fight Pass Brazil.

== Championships and accomplishments ==
- International Vale Tudo Championship
  - IVC IVC Heavyweight Championship (One time)
- International Vale Tudo Championship
  - IVC Superfight Championship (One time)
- Meca World Vale Tudo
  - MWVT Heavyweight Championship (One time)
- Universal Vale Tudo
  - UVC 6 Tournament Winner (1996)

== Mixed martial arts record ==
Professional record breakdown
23 matches	14 wins	9 losses
By knockout	8	2
By submission	5	0
By decision	1	7

Res.	Record	Opponent	Method	Event	Date	Round	Time	Location	Notes
Loss	14–9	Vladimir Matyushenko	TKO (knee injury)	Jungle Fight 4	21 May 2005	1	0:26	Manaus, Brazil	
Loss	14–8	Martin Malkhasyan	Decision (unanimous)	M-1 MFC: Heavyweight GP	4 December 2004	2	5:00	Moscow, Russia	
Loss	14–7	Aleksander Emelianenko	Decision (unanimous)	M-1 MFC: Middleweight GP	9 October 2004	3	5:00	Saint Petersburg, Russia	
Win	14–6	Bobby Hoffman	TKO (submission to punches)	Jungle Fight 2	15 May 2004	2	n/a	Manaus, Brazil	
Loss	13–6	Travis Wiuff	Decision (unanimous)	Heat FC 2	18 December 2003	3	5:00	Natal, Brazil	
Win	13–5	Ben Rothwell	KO (head kick)	Heat FC 1	31 July 2003	1	N/A	Natal, Brazil	
Win	12–5	Marcelo Souza	TKO (doctor stoppage)	Meca World Vale Tudo 6	31 January 2002	1	7:08	Curitiba, Brazil	Won Meca World Vale Tudo Heavyweight Title
Loss	11–5	Ian Freeman	Decision (unanimous)	HOOKnSHOOT Kings 1	17 November 2001	3	5:00	Evansville, Indiana, United States	For HOOKnSHOOT Heavyweight Title
Loss	11–4	Gilbert Yvel	KO (flying knee)	2 Hot 2 Handle 2	18 March 2001	1	2:20	Rotterdam, Netherlands	
Loss	11–3	Chris Haseman	Decision (unanimous)	Rings: King of Kings 2000 Block B	22 December 2000	2	5:00	Osaka, Japan	
Win	11–2	Tra Telligman	TKO (corner stoppage)	Pride 9	4 June 2000	2	10:00	Nagoya, Japan	
Win	10–2	Gary Myers	Submission (broken leg)	International Vale Tudo Championship 12	26 August 1999	1	8:13	São Paulo, Brazil	Won the IVC 12 Superfight.
Loss	9–2	Igor Vovchanchyn	Decision (split)	Pride 6	4 July 1999	3	5:00	Yokohama, Japan	
Win	9–1	Pedro Otavio	TKO (submission to punches)	International Vale Tudo Championship 10	27 April 1999	1	6:19	Brazil	Won IVC Heavyweight Championship.
Win	8–1	Branden Lee Hinkle	Submission (guillotine choke)	International Vale Tudo Championship 8	20 January 1999	1	4:32	Aracaju, Brazil	
Loss	7–1	Dave Beneteau	Decision (unanimous)	UFC 15	17 October 1997	1	15:00	Bay St. Louis, Mississippi, United States	
Win	7–0	Paul Varelans	TKO (elbows and punches)	Brazil Open '97	15 June 1997	1	2:33	Brazil	
Win	6–0	Kevin Randleman	Technical Submission (triangle choke)	Universal Vale Tudo Fighting 6	3 March 1997	1	22:24	Brazil	Won UVF 6 Tournament
Win	5–0	Dan Bobish	Submission (triangle choke)	Universal Vale Tudo Fighting 6	3 March 1997	1	7:47	Brazil	
Win	4–0	Geza Kalman	Submission (guillotine choke)	Universal Vale Tudo Fighting 6	3 March 1997	1	3:02	Brazil	
Win	3–0	Alexander Rafalski	TKO (corner stoppage)	Martial Arts Reality Superfighting	22 November 1996	1	1:00	Birmingham, Alabama, United States	
Win	2–0	John Dixson	TKO (submission to punches)	Universal Vale Tudo Fighting 2	24 June 1996	1	1:38	Brazil	
Win	1–0	Mikhail Ilyukhin	Submission (rear-naked choke)	Universal Vale Tudo Fighting 1	5 April 1996	2	3:15	Japan	

== Submission grappling record ==
? Matches, ? Wins, ? Losses, ? Draws
Result	Rec.	Opponent	Method	Event	Date	Location
Loss	1–2–0	(Brazil) Ricco Rodriguez	Decision · Points	2000 ADCC World Championships	1 March 2000	Abu Dhabi, United Arab Emirates
Loss	1–2–0	(Brazil) Sean Alvarez	Decision · Points	2000 ADCC World Championships	1 March 2000	Abu Dhabi, United Arab Emirates
Loss	1–1–0	(United States) Mark Kerr	Decision · Points	1999 ADCC World Championships	24 February 1999	Abu Dhabi, United Arab Emirates
Win	1–0–0	(Brazil) Paulo Teodoro	Decision · Points	1996 IBJJF World Jiu-Jitsu Championship	4 February 1996	Rio de Janeiro, Brazil

== Kickboxing record (incomplete) ==
Professional kickboxing record
? wins, ? loss, ? draw
Date	Result	Opponent	Event	Location	Method	Round	Time	Record
2003-03-23	Loss	Luis Dos Santos	K-1: Brazil 2003	São Paulo, Brazil	Decision	3	3:00	0-1

== See also ==
- List of male mixed martial artists
- List of UFC champions
- List of current UFC fighters
