= Heath Herring =

American mixed martial artist (born 1978)

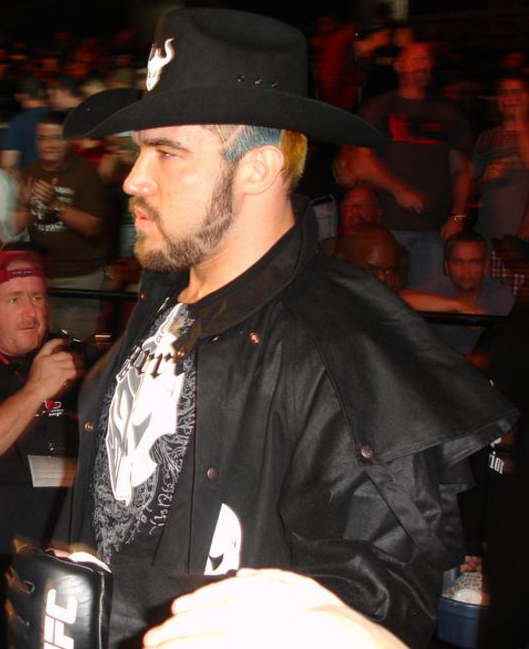
- Born: March 2, 1978 (age 48); Waco, Texas, United States
- Other names: The Texas Crazy Horse
- Height: 6 ft 4 in (1.93 m)
- Weight: 250 lb (113 kg; 17 st 12 lb)
- Division: Heavyweight
- Reach: 78 in (198 cm)
- Style: Wrestling, Sambo, Boxing, Muay Thai
- Fighting out of: Las Vegas, Nevada, United States
- Team: Golden Glory; Las Vegas Combat Club; Xtreme Couture
- Trainer: Cor Hemmers
- Years active: 1997–2008, 2016–2017

Mixed martial arts record
- Total: 45
- Wins: 28
- By knockout: 10
- By submission: 13
- By decision: 4
- By disqualification: 1
- Losses: 16
- By knockout: 5
- By submission: 1
- By decision: 10
- No contests: 1

Other information
- Mixed martial arts record from Sherdog

Heath Herring (born March 2, 1978) is an American former professional mixed martial artist who competed in the Heavyweight division. While perhaps best known for competing in PRIDE, he also competed for the UFC, K-1 and Rizin.

== Background ==
Herring was born in Waco, Texas and was raised in Amarillo, Texas. His mother is a psychologist working for the Texas prison system and his father is an attorney who owns two different law firms. Herring attended Amarillo High School and played competitive football while being pursued by the school's Wrestling coach to join the team. Herring initially resisted, but in his senior year Herring began training and qualified as one of the top ten competitors in the state for the state championships. Soon after, he began practicing Sambo. Herring began training to fight in mixed martial arts when he graduated high school at the age of 18, but also continued his football career as a defensive end for West Texas A&M University's Division II program, although he did not finish his college education.

== Mixed martial arts career ==
=== Early career ===
Herring made his professional mixed martial arts debut in 1997 and compiled a record of 13-5 before being signed by PRIDE. After reaching the final of the World Vale Tudo Championship 8 tournament held in Aruba in July 1999, Herring was invited to learn kickboxing in the Netherlands by the show's Dutch promoter Bas Boone and he trained under Cor Hemmers at Golden Glory for a number of years.

=== PRIDE Fighting Championships ===
Herring is a longtime veteran in PRIDE, where he participated in 17 fights. Herring was very popular with the Japanese crowd for his unique hairstyles and colors, as well as sporting a duster coat and cowboy hat to the ring during his entrances.

Herring made his promotional debut at PRIDE 9 against wrestler Willie Peeters and won via rear-naked choke submission in the first round. Herring then followed this up with three more wins before being handed his first defeat in the promotion at the hands of Vitor Belfort via unanimous decision at PRIDE 14. Herring followed this up with an impressive TKO win over Mark Kerr before receiving a shot for the inaugural PRIDE Heavyweight Championship.

Herring took part in the first PRIDE Heavyweight Championship fight against Antônio Rodrigo Nogueira where he lost by unanimous decision. Despite his earlier championship loss to Nogueira, he was widely considered the number one contender until his first round loss to Fedor Emelianenko. After the loss to Emelianenko, Herring fought Mirko Cro Cop at PRIDE 26 and was defeated in the first round via TKO. Herring then bounced back, winning his next four consecutive fights before facing Antônio Rodrigo Nogueira in a rematch at PRIDE Critical Countdown 2004. Herring lost the rematch via anaconda choke submission in the second round. Herring would make his last appearance for the promotion at PRIDE 28 on October 31, 2004 against Hirotaka Yokoi and won via first-round TKO in under two minutes.

Herring parted ways with PRIDE in late 2004 because of management disputes.

=== New Year's Eve kiss ===
On December 31, 2005, Herring was involved in a memorable MMA moment during K-1's Dynamite 2005 show. During the pre-fight staredown, his opponent, Yoshihiro Nakao, leaned in and kissed him on the lips. Herring reacted, delivering a right hook to the jaw of Nakao, knocking him down. Herring was immediately disqualified and Nakao was carried from the ring. Shortly thereafter, Nakao's cornermen attacked Herring and a brief fight ensued. Herring's trainers, Ricardo Pires and Sergio Penha fought with Nakao's trainers until security stopped the fight. The fight result has since been changed by K-1 from a disqualification loss for Herring to a no contest, as K-1 judges ruled that Nakao's kiss and Herring's subsequent knockout punch were both fouls.

=== Transition to the UFC ===
Heath Herring debuted in the UFC for UFC Fight Night 8 and lost on decision against Jake O'Brien after deciding to fight after being injured.

On Saturday, April 7, 2007, at UFC 69 Heath faced off against The Ultimate Fighter 2 Heavyweight finalist Brad Imes. Herring won the match by unanimous decision after 3 rounds.

At UFC 73, Herring lost via unanimous decision to Antônio Rodrigo Nogueira, but not before he landed a left high kick to Nogueira's head late in the first round. Nogueira was sent to the ground, visibly stunned, but Herring did not engage him and attempt to finish the fight, opting to stand up shortly after the kick and beckoned Nogueira to stand as well. The referee motioned Noguiera to stand up after the brief flurry on the ground, giving Herring the advantage but Herring was not able to finish the fight in the first round.

At UFC 82 Heath won a three-round split-decision against rising contender Cheick Kongo. While both are considered strikers, much of the fight took place on the ground. After the fight Heath said he was not happy with the fight, he wanted to give the fans a stand-up fight and Kongo refused to stand with him. Herring also said after the fight that he did not even train at all for the ground game.

Herring fought Brock Lesnar at UFC 87 after Mark Coleman was forced to withdraw due to a knee injury. The fight went the full 3 rounds and Lesnar was declared winner by unanimous decision. Herring was knocked down early in the first round with a straight right. According to Heath Herring's official Facebook profile in a note titled "6 Months To Rest", Herring is said to have suffered a broken orbital bone from the first punch of the fight. Herring was scheduled to fight Cain Velasquez at UFC 99, but was forced to withdraw due to an undisclosed illness.

Herring stated in November 2010 that he wants to fight as soon as possible. He was still under contract with the UFC and was expected to make his return.

In September 2011, responding to a question asked via Twitter, UFC President Dana White commented that Herring "...retired after the Lesnar fight".

Herring has taken up the hobby of playing poker since his retirement from MMA and is also a commentator for Rizin Fighting Federation.

=== Joining Rizin FF Openweight tournament ===
After eight years away from the sport, the 38-year-old Herring ended his retirement and signed with the Japanese promotion Rizin Fighting Federation. He faced Amir Aliakbari, an Iranian wrestling standout, in the quarter-final round of the openweight grand prix, replacing fellow former UFC fighter Shane Carwin. Herring lost the bout by unanimous decision. Herring than stepped into the ring again to fight a second bout against former kickboxer and judoka Satoshi Ishii. The bout went the distance, and though Herring was praised for his retained competitive sport, he again lost by unanimous decision. Going 0-2 in his attempted comeback, though he never formally retired, Herring returned to inactivity and has not fought since 2017.

== Film career ==
Heath Herring starred in Never Surrender, released by Lions Gate Entertainment in 2009 as well as Circle of Pain. He has also appeared in Hell's Chain, Unrivaled, Beatdown, and Division III: Football's Finest.

== Personal life ==
Herring was married when he was 18 years old and has a daughter, but the marriage ended in divorce. In August 2014 he remarried, to TV presenter Sarah Grant. They had a daughter in 2019. Herring's brother also competed in MMA, holding an undefeated 5-0 record before attending Baylor University to play football as an offensive tackle. Herring currently lives in Las Vegas. Before becoming a professional fighter, he worked as a computer programmer.

In the last eight years, all through his thirties, Herring has worked as a stunt man in Hollywood, worked as a professional poker player and launched a mixed martial arts promotion in Argentina.

== Championships and accomplishments ==
=== Mixed martial arts ===
- Ultimate Fighting Championship
  - UFC.com Awards
    - 2008: Ranked #7 Upset of the Year vs. Cheick Kongo
- World Vale Tudo Championship
  - WVC 9 Heavyweight Tournament Winner
  - WVC 8 Heavyweight Tournament Runner Up
- Superbrawl
  - Superbrawl 13 Heavyweight Tournament Semifinalist
- Bas Rutten Invitational
  - Bas Rutten Invitational 3 Tournament Winner

== Mixed martial arts record ==
Professional record breakdown
| 45 matches | 28 wins | 16 losses |
| By knockout | 10 | 5 |
| By submission | 13 | 1 |
| By decision | 4 | 10 |
| By disqualification | 1 | 0 |
| No contests | 1 | |

| Res. | Record | Opponent | Method | Event | Date | Round | Time | Location | Notes |
|---|---|---|---|---|---|---|---|---|---|
| Loss | 28–16 (1) | Satoshi Ishii | Decision (unanimous) | Rizin 2017 in Yokohama: Sakura | April 16, 2017 | 2 | 5:00 | Yokohama, Japan | |
| Loss | 28–15 (1) | Amir Aliakbari | Decision (unanimous) | Rizin World Grand Prix 2016: 2nd Round | December 29, 2016 | 2 | 5:00 | Saitama, Japan | 2016 Rizin Openweight Grand Prix Quarterfinal. |
| Loss | 28–14 (1) | Brock Lesnar | Decision (unanimous) | UFC 87 | August 9, 2008 | 3 | 5:00 | Minneapolis, Minnesota, United States | |
| Win | 28–13 (1) | Cheick Kongo | Decision (split) | UFC 82 | March 1, 2008 | 3 | 5:00 | Columbus, Ohio, United States | |
| Loss | 27–13 (1) | Antônio Rodrigo Nogueira | Decision (unanimous) | UFC 73 | July 7, 2007 | 3 | 5:00 | Sacramento, California, United States | |
| Win | 27–12 (1) | Brad Imes | Decision (unanimous) | UFC 69 | April 7, 2007 | 3 | 5:00 | Houston, Texas, United States | |
| Loss | 26–12 (1) | Jake O'Brien | Decision (unanimous) | UFC Fight Night: Evans vs Salmon | January 25, 2007 | 3 | 5:00 | Hollywood, Florida, United States | |
| Win | 26–11 (1) | Gary Goodridge | TKO (punches) | Hero's 4 | March 15, 2006 | 2 | 1:55 | Tokyo, Japan | |
| NC | 25–11 (1) | Yoshihiro Nakao | No Contest | K-1 PREMIUM 2005 Dynamite!! | December 31, 2005 | 1 | 0:00 | Osaka, Japan | Nakao kissed Herring during the pre-match stare-down, after which Herring knocked him out with a punch rendering him unable to continue. Originally ruled a DQ and overturned to a NC. |
| Loss | 25–11 | Sam Greco | TKO (knee injury) | HERO'S 1 | March 26, 2005 | 1 | 2:24 | Saitama, Japan | |
| Win | 25–10 | Hirotaka Yokoi | TKO (knees) | PRIDE 28 | October 31, 2004 | 1 | 1:55 | Saitama, Japan | |
| Loss | 24–10 | Antônio Rodrigo Nogueira | Submission (anaconda choke) | PRIDE Critical Countdown 2004 | June 20, 2004 | 2 | 0:30 | Saitama, Japan | 2004 PRIDE Heavyweight Grand Prix Quarterfinals. |
| Win | 24–9 | Kazuo Takahashi | TKO (punches) | PRIDE Total Elimination 2004 | April 25, 2004 | 1 | 4:53 | Saitama, Japan | 2004 PRIDE Heavyweight Grand Prix First Round. |
| Win | 23–9 | Gan McGee | Decision (split) | PRIDE 27 | February 1, 2004 | 3 | 5:00 | Osaka, Japan | |
| Win | 22–9 | Paulo Cesar Silva | Submission (rear-naked choke) | PRIDE Shockwave 2003 | December 31, 2003 | 3 | 0:35 | Saitama, Japan | |
| Win | 21–9 | Yoshihisa Yamamoto | Submission (rear-naked choke) | PRIDE Final Conflict 2003 | November 9, 2003 | 3 | 2:29 | Tokyo, Japan | |
| Loss | 20–9 | Mirko Cro Cop | TKO (body kick and punches) | PRIDE 26 | June 8, 2003 | 1 | 3:17 | Yokohama, Japan | |
| Loss | 20–8 | Fedor Emelianenko | TKO (doctor stoppage) | PRIDE 23 | November 24, 2002 | 1 | 10:00 | Tokyo, Japan | |
| Win | 20–7 | Yuriy Kochkine | TKO (knees) | PRIDE 22 | September 29, 2002 | 1 | 7:31 | Nagoya, Japan | |
| Win | 19–7 | Igor Vovchanchyn | Decision (unanimous) | PRIDE 19 | February 24, 2002 | 3 | 5:00 | Saitama, Japan | |
| Loss | 18–7 | Antônio Rodrigo Nogueira | Decision (unanimous) | PRIDE 17 | November 3, 2001 | 3 | 5:00 | Tokyo, Japan | For the PRIDE Heavyweight Championship. |
| Win | 18–6 | Mark Kerr | TKO (knees) | PRIDE 15 | July 29, 2001 | 2 | 4:56 | Saitama, Japan | |
| Loss | 17–6 | Vitor Belfort | Decision (unanimous) | PRIDE 14 | May 27, 2001 | 3 | 5:00 | Yokohama, Japan | |
| Win | 17–5 | Denis Sobolev | Submission (americana) | PRIDE 13 | March 25, 2001 | 1 | 0:22 | Saitama, Japan | |
| Win | 16–5 | Enson Inoue | TKO (knees) | PRIDE 12 | December 9, 2000 | 1 | 4:52 | Saitama, Japan | |
| Win | 15–5 | Tom Erikson | Submission (rear-naked choke) | PRIDE 11 | October 31, 2000 | 1 | 6:17 | Osaka, Japan | |
| Win | 14–5 | Willie Peeters | Submission (rear-naked choke) | PRIDE 9 | June 4, 2000 | 1 | 0:48 | Nagoya, Japan | |
| Loss | 13–5 | Ramazan Mezhidov | TKO (doctor stoppage) | IAFC: Pankration World Championship 2000 Day 2 | April 29, 2000 | 1 | 4:55 | Moscow, Russia | Doctor stoppage due to cut. |
| Win | 13–4 | Rene Rooze | DQ (excessive fouling) | 2 Hot 2 Handle 1 | March 5, 2000 | 1 | 3:20 | Rotterdam, The Netherlands | |
| Win | 12–4 | Bob Schrijber | TKO (punches) | World Vale Tudo Championship 9 | September 27, 1999 | 1 | 2:19 | Aruba | Won the World Vale Tudo Championship 9 Tournament. |
| Win | 11–4 | Sean McCully | Submission (kimura) | World Vale Tudo Championship 9 | September 27, 1999 | 1 | 0:43 | Aruba | World Vale Tudo Championship 9 Tournament Semifinals. |
| Win | 10–4 | Michael Tielrooy | Submission (americana) | World Vale Tudo Championship 9 | September 27, 1999 | 1 | 1:14 | Aruba | World Vale Tudo Championship 9 Tournament Quarterfinals. |
| Loss | 9–4 | Bobby Hoffman | Decision (unanimous) | SuperBrawl 13 | September 7, 1999 | 2 | 5:00 | Honolulu, Hawaii, United States | Superbrawl 13 Heavyweight Tournament Semifinals. |
| Win | 9–3 | Rocky Batastini | Submission (rear-naked choke) | SuperBrawl 13 | September 7, 1999 | 1 | 1:00 | Honolulu, Hawaii, United States | Superbrawl 13 Heavyweight Tournament Quarterfinals. |
| Loss | 8–3 | Alexandre Ferreira | Decision (split) | World Vale Tudo Championship 8 | July 1, 1999 | 1 | 30:00 | Aruba | World Vale Tudo Championship 8 Finals. |
| Win | 8–2 | Kavkaz Soultanmagomedov | TKO (submission to punches) | World Vale Tudo Championship 8 | July 1, 1999 | 1 | 1:18 | Aruba | World Vale Tudo Championship 8 Semifinals. |
| Win | 7–2 | Erwin van den Steen | TKO (submission to punches) | World Vale Tudo Championship 8 | July 1, 1999 | 1 | 4:33 | Aruba | World Vale Tudo Championship 8 Quarterfinals. |
| Win | 6–2 | Gabe Beauperthy | Submission (armlock) | Bas Rutten Invitational 3 | June 1, 1999 | 1 | 4:43 | Colorado, United States | Won the Bas Rutten Invitational 3 Heavyweight Tournament. |
| Win | 5–2 | Hoss Carter | Submission (americana) | Bas Rutten Invitational 3 | June 1, 1999 | 1 | 1:07 | Colorado, United States | Bas Rutten Invitational 3 Heavyweight Tournament Quarterfinals. |
| Loss | 4–2 | Travis Fulton | Decision (unanimous) | Extreme Challenge 24 | May 15, 1999 | 1 | 12:00 | Salt Lake City, Utah, United States | |
| Win | 4–1 | Phil Deason | Submission (americana) | WVF: Durango | April 17, 1999 | 1 | 0:13 | Durango, Colorado, United States | |
| Win | 3–1 | Nik Bickle | TKO (submission to punches) | WVF: Durango | April 17, 1999 | 1 | 0:32 | Durango, Colorado, United States | |
| Win | 2–1 | Evan Tanner | Submission (rear-naked choke) | PSDA | November 22, 1997 | 1 | 8:20 | Texas, United States | |
| Loss | 1–1 | Evan Tanner | TKO (exhaustion) | Unified Shoot Wrestling Federation 7 | October 18, 1997 | 1 | 6:19 | Amarillo, Texas, United States | |
| Win | 1–0 | Chris Guillen | Submission (rear-naked choke) | Unified Shoot Wrestling Federation 4 | April 12, 1997 | 1 | 2:10 | Amarillo, Texas, United States | |
