= Russian hook =

Russian martial arts technique

A Russian hook is a punch, used in Russian combat sports, which resembles a traditional boxing hook yet keeping the puncher's thumb towards the floor. Its name is a Japanese wasei-eigo, Russian hook (ロシアン・フック, roshian fukku), coined by Satoru Sayama due to its association with mixed martial arts in Japan, where it was popularized by Igor Vovchanchyn and Fedor Emelianenko.

== Technique ==
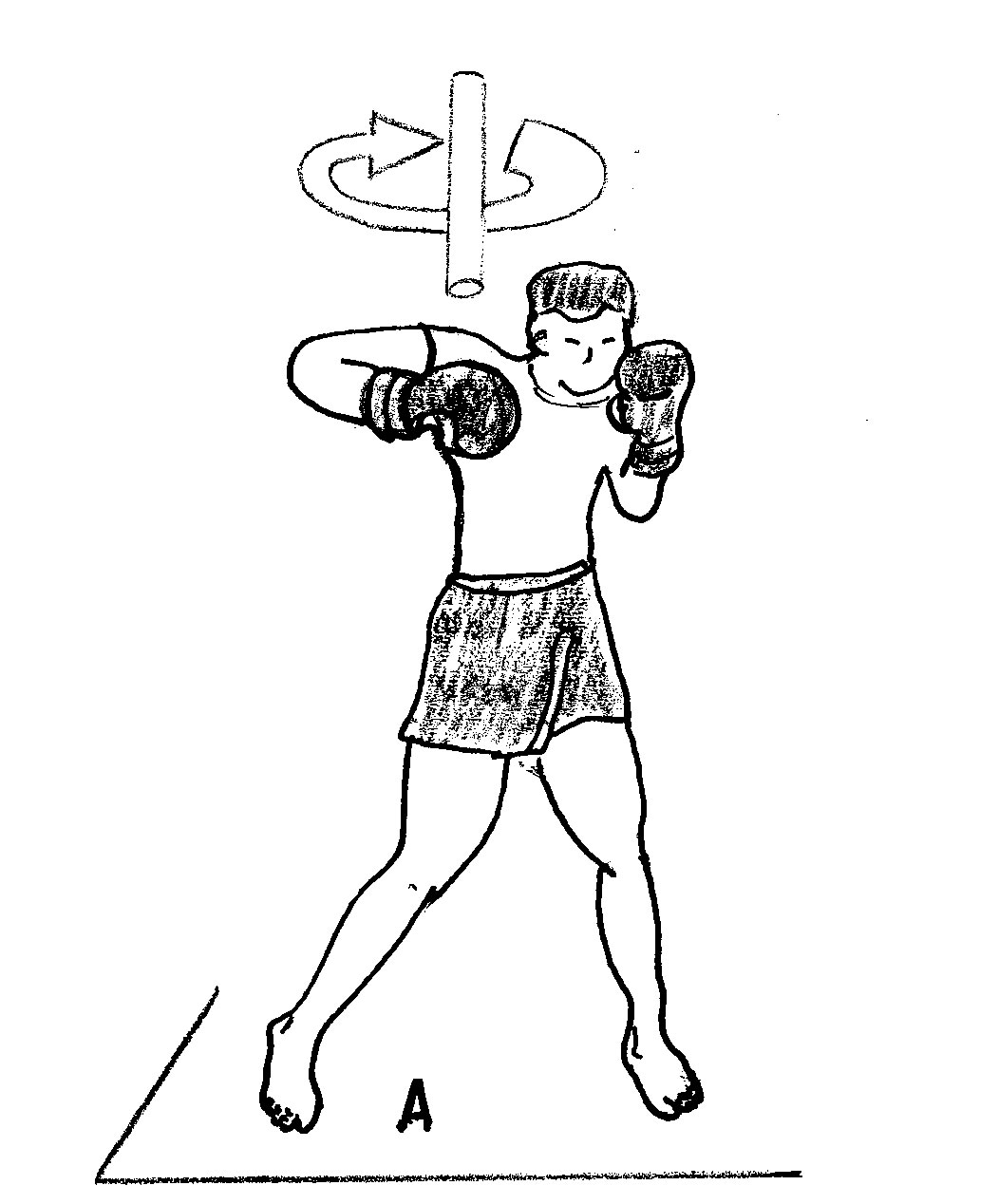
Boxing hook.

The Russian hook or mawashi uchi is superficially similar to a regular boxing hook, but unlike most boxing punches, it disregards hip and body movement and instead capitalizes on rotation of the shoulder and arm. While doing it, the puncher internally rotates his punching hand so the thumb points down to the floor and follows a trajectory around a vertical axis, hitting the opponent with the knuckles of an upside down hand. Some sources consider it less of a punch than a forward-facing backfist, liable to be found illegal in orthodox boxing. In karate it is used often to travel around the opponent's head and strike its back.

It is considered a complicated and situational technique, which becomes more useful in rulesets combining both striking and grappling. Throwing the hook minimizes leg movement and positioning, making it easier to respond to a takedown attempt, and eases the transition to grappling after impact. The technique also allows the user to extend his arm and range almost as much as a straight, and simultaneously raises the shoulder of the punching arm up to cover the chin. However, improper contact increases the risk of hand injuries compared to other punches.

== History ==
Its origin is often traced to Russian boxing, although it is also attributed to Russian martial arts like sambo and systema. It was popularized in mixed martial arts during the 90s by Ukrainian pioneer Igor Vovchanchyn. One of his most notable victories achieved through Russian hooks was his KO of Francisco Bueno in November 1999 in PRIDE Fighting Championships. The move was later used too by Fedor Emelianenko and Kazakh boxing champion Gennady Golovkin. The name Russian hook was coined by Satoru Sayama, trainer and founder of the first MMA promotion, Shooto. Sayama started teaching it as part of the Shooto curriculum, just like his former mentor, Toshio Fujiwara, did in his kickboxing gyms. The Russian hook was also used in professional wrestling by one of Sayama's apprentices, Tiger Mask IV, in 2000.

== Bibliography ==
- Nakamura, Tadashi (2001). Karate Technique & Spirit. Tuttle Publishing. ISBN 9781462917099.
- Sayama, Satoru (2010). 佐山原理 新生武道真陰. Toho. ISBN 9784809408502.
