= Enson Inoue =

Japanese-Hawaiian mixed martial artist

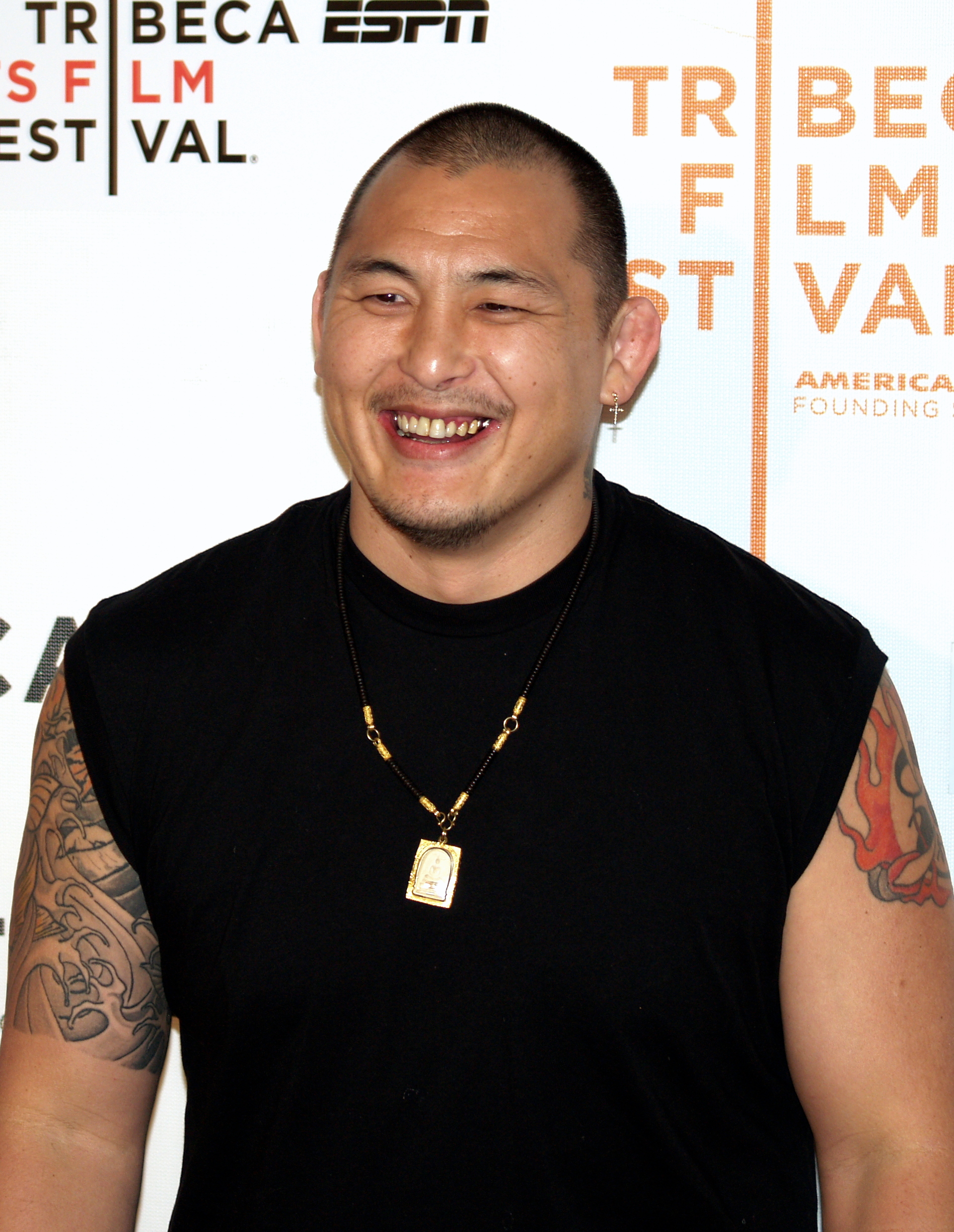
- Inoue in 2008
- Born: Enson Shoji Inoue; April 15, 1967 (age 59); Honolulu, Hawaii, United States
- Other names: Yamatodamashii (大和魂)
- Height: 5 ft 10 in (1.78 m)
- Weight: 204 lb (93 kg; 14.6 st)
- Division: Heavyweight; Light Heavyweight
- Style: Brazilian Jiu-Jitsu
- Stance: Orthodox
- Teachers: Satoru Sayama; John Lewis
- Rank: Black belt in Brazilian jiu-jitsu A-Class Shootist; Fourth degree black belt in Bujinkan Budo Taijutsu
- Years active: 1995–2004, 2010

Mixed martial arts record
- Total: 20
- Wins: 12
- By knockout: 5
- By submission: 7
- Losses: 8
- By knockout: 5
- By submission: 1
- By decision: 2

Other information
- Notable relatives: Egan Inoue, brother
- Mixed martial arts record from Sherdog

Enson Shoji Inoue (Japanese: エンセン井上; born April 15, 1967) is a Japanese-Hawaiian jiu-jitsu practitioner and retired professional mixed martial artist. A professional competitor from 1995 until 2010, he fought for the PRIDE Fighting Championships, the UFC, Shooto, and Vale Tudo Japan. He was the first and only Shooto Heavyweight Champion, and was a finalist in the Lightweight category at UFC 13.

Born and raised in Hawaii, he has resided in Japan since the 1990s. He is sometimes known by the moniker "Yamatodamashii," a Japanese phrase meaning "the spirit of ancient Japan." His brother, Egan Inoue, is also a martial artist and a professional racquetball competitor.

== Background ==
Inoue was born and raised in Honolulu, Hawaii, to third-generation Japanese American parents Errol and Evangeline Inoue, making him a Yonsei (fourth-generation Japanese-Hawaiian). He attended University High School, and began practicing the martial arts hapkido and taekwondo in order to defend himself from bullies. Inoue also played football, baseball, basketball, volleyball, ran in track and field, and also excelled in racquetball, alongside his brother Egan.

Inoue began learning Brazilian jiu-jitsu. He and his brother were awarded black belts in Brazilian jiu-jitsu by John Lewis in 1998. He demoted himself to purple belt in July 2016 citing that the sport has moved on since attaining his black belt, though he would change his mind after conversations with Lewis. He also holds a yondan (fourth degree black belt) in Bujinkan Budo Taijutsu.

== Mixed Martial Arts Career ==
Inoue was given a tryout by Satoru Sayama for Shooto after contacting every Japanese MMA promotion he could. He sparred with Yuki Nakai, impressing Sayama and earning his first fight which took place three months later. His debut bout was against Shingo Shigeta at Shooto: Vale Tudo Access 3 on January 21, 1995, which ended in a victory by technical knockout. He won the Shooto Heavyweight Champion against Joe Estes at Shooto: Reconquista 4, on October 12, 1997.

Inoue competed professionally from 1995 to 2010, retiring with a 12-8-0 record. His other achievements include a victory over UFC Hall of Famer Randy Couture, and giving Frank Shamrock one of his toughest matches. His final bout was against Antz Nansen on April 25, 2010, in Tokyo, which he won by submission.

== Other activities ==
Inoue runs several MMA gyms located in Japan, Saipan, and Guam under the name Purebred. He also has affiliated gyms located in Thailand, Canada and the USA.

He appeared in the 2008 martial arts film Redbelt as a cameo role, and was featured in the documentary film Rites of Passage: The Rebirth of Combat Sports.

== Personal life ==
Inoue has a stepson (Erson) and is the brother of Egan Inoue, a mixed martial artist and a two time racquetball World Champion player. He was married to the sister of Ultimate Fighting Championship Bantamweight fighter Norifumi Yamamoto. He took in and trained Norifumi in mixed martial arts after an incident with the yakuza. Enson has asserted that he is "not yakuza" but admits to doing business with members of yakuza.

In the aftermath of the 2011 Tōhoku earthquake and tsunami, Enson travelled to northeast Japan to directly help the victims.

In 2020, news broke that the IBJJF had refused to recognize Inoue's official rank as a BJJ black belt, despite him competing at the highest levels of the sport as early as 1999.

Enson is married to Sarah Jane McCann, who is from New Zealand of Māori descent.

== Legal issues ==
In October 2008, Inoue was arrested in Tokyo for marijuana possession and spent 28 days in prison before being released on November 14, 2008. He was eventually given a two-year suspended sentence and ordered to serve four years probation. During his probation period, he was forbidden from leaving Japan.

== Championships and accomplishments ==
- Shooto
  - Heavyweight Championship (One time)
- Ultimate Fighting Championship
  - UFC 13 Lightweight Tournament Finalist

== Mixed martial arts record ==
Professional record breakdown
20 matches	12 wins	8 losses
By knockout	5	5
By submission	7	1
By decision	0	2

Res.	Record	Opponent	Method	Event	Date	Round	Time	Location	Notes
Win	12–8	Antz Nansen	Submission (armbar)	Astra: Yoshida's Farewell	April 25, 2010	1	2:10	Tokyo, Japan	
Loss	11–8	Tommy Sauer	TKO (punches)	SB 35: SuperBrawl 35	April 16, 2004	1	4:14	Hawaii, United States	
Win	11–7	Soichi Nishida	Submission (choke)	FFCF 1: Fury Full Contact Fighting 1	January 10, 2004	1	1:00	Guam	
Loss	10–7	Antônio Rodrigo Nogueira	Technical submission (triangle choke)	PRIDE 19	February 24, 2002	1	6:17	Saitama, Japan	
Loss	10–6	Heath Herring	TKO (knees)	PRIDE 12	December 9, 2000	1	4:52	Saitama, Japan	
Loss	10–5	Igor Vovchanchyn	TKO (doctor stoppage)	PRIDE 10	August 27, 2000	1	10:00	Tokyo, Japan	
Loss	10–4	Mark Kerr	Decision (unanimous)	PRIDE Grand Prix 2000: Opening Round	January 30, 2000	1	15:00	Tokyo, Japan	
Win	10–3	Soichi Nishida	Submission (rear-naked choke)	PRIDE 5	April 29, 1999	1	0:24	Nagoya, Japan	
Win	9–3	Randy Couture	Submission (armbar)	VTJ 1998: Vale Tudo Japan 1998	October 25, 1998	1	1:39	Tokyo, Japan	
Loss	8–3	Frank Shamrock	TKO (punches)	VTJ 1997: Vale Tudo Japan 1997	November 29, 1997	2	7:17	Tokyo, Japan	
Win	8–2	Joe Estes	TKO (submission to punches)	Shooto: Reconquista 4	October 12, 1997	1	1:06	Tokyo, Japan	Won the Shooto Heavyweight Championship.
Win	7–2	Royce Alger	Technical Submission (armbar)	UFC 13	May 30, 1997	1	1:36	Augusta, Georgia, United States	
Win	6–2	Rei Zulu	TKO (elbows)	Shooto: Reconquista 2	April 6, 1997	1	0:45	Tokyo, Japan	
Win	5–2	Mushtaq Abdullah	TKO (submission to punches)	Shooto: Let's Get Lost	October 4, 1996	1	0:38	Tokyo, Japan	
Loss	4–2	Igor Zinoviev	TKO (punches)	VTJ 1996: Vale Tudo Japan 1996	July 7, 1996	1	0:44	Tokyo, Japan	
Loss	4–1	Joe Estes	Decision (majority)	Shooto: Vale Tudo Junction 3	May 7, 1996	3	8:00	Tokyo, Japan	
Win	4–0	Andre Mannaart	TKO (punches)	Shooto: Vale Tudo Junction 1	January 20, 1996	1	3:20	Tokyo, Japan	
Win	3–0	Ed de Kruijf	Technical Submission (armbar)	Shooto: Complete Vale Tudo Access	July 29, 1995	1	1:40	Japan	
Win	2–0	Rene Rooze	Submission (rear naked choke)	VTJ 1995: Vale Tudo Japan 1995	April 20, 1995	1	6:41	Japan	
Win	1–0	Shingo Shigeta	TKO (punches)	Shooto: Vale Tudo Access 3	January 21, 1995	1	1:10	Tokyo, Japan	

== Submission grappling record ==
Result	Opponent	Method	Event	Date	Round	Time	Notes
Win	Tully Kulihaapai	Submission (armbar)	PRIDE 7	1999	1		
Loss	Mario Sperry	Points	ADCC 1999 Absolute	1999	1		

== See also ==
- List of male mixed martial artists
