= 2001 in Pride FC =

Mixed martial arts events

Information
- First date: March 25, 2001
- Last date: December 23, 2001

Events
- Total events: 6

Fights
- Total fights: 49
- Title fights: 2

Chronology
2000 in Pride	2001 in Pride FC	2002 in Pride

The year 2001 was the 5th year in the history of the Pride Fighting Championships, a mixed martial arts promotion based in Japan. 2001 had 6 events beginning with, Pride 13 - Collision Course.

== Title fights ==
Title fights in 2001
Weight class				Method	Round	Time	Event	Notes
Middleweight	Wanderlei Silva	def.	Kazushi Sakuraba	TKO (Doctor Stoppage)	1	10:00	Pride 17	(Note: For The Pride Fighting Championship World Middleweight Championship.)
Heavyweight	Antônio Rodrigo Nogueira	def.	Heath Herring	Decision (Unanimous)	3	5:00	Pride 17	(Note: For The Pride Fighting Championship World Heavyweight Championship.)

== Debut Pride FC fighters ==
The following fighters fought their first Pride FC fight in 2001:

- Alex Stiebling
- Antônio Rodrigo Nogueira
- Antonio Schembri
- Assuério Silva
- Bobby Southworth
- Chuck Liddell
- Denis Sobolev
- Don Frye
- Jan Nortje
- Jeremy Horn
- Jose Landi
- Mario Sperry
- Matt Skelton
- Michiyoshi Ohara
- Mirko Cro Cop
- Murilo Rua
- Quinton Jackson
- Ricardo Arona
- Semmy Schilt
- Shungo Oyama
- Tadao Yasuda
- Valentijn Overeem
- Yoshihiro Takayama
- Yoshihisa Yamamoto
- Yuki Ishikawa

== Events list ==
#	Event	Japanese name	Date held	Venue	City	Attendance
20	Pride 18 - Cold Fury 2	—N/a	December 23, 2001	Marine Messe Fukuoka	Fukuoka, Japan	—N/a
19	Pride 17 - Championship Chaos	—N/a	November 3, 2001	Tokyo Dome	Tokyo, Japan	53,200
18	Pride 16 - Beasts from the East	—N/a	September 24, 2001	Osaka-jo Hall	Osaka, Japan	—N/a
17	Pride 15 - Raging Rumble	—N/a	July 29, 2001	Saitama Super Arena	Saitama, Japan	—N/a
16	Pride 14 - Clash of the Titans	—N/a	May 27, 2001	Yokohama Arena	Yokohama, Japan	—N/a
15	Pride 13 - Collision Course	—N/a	March 25, 2001	Saitama Super Arena	Saitama, Japan	—N/a

== Pride 13: Collision Course ==
Pride 13
- Promotion: Pride Fighting Championships
- Date: March 25, 2001
- Venue: Saitama Super Arena
- City: Saitama

Event chronology
Pride 12	Pride 13	Pride 14

Pride 13: Collision Course was an event held on March 25, 2001 at the Saitama Super Arena in Saitama, Japan.

=== Results ===
Main Card
Weight class				Method	Round	Time	Notes
	Wanderlei Silva	def.	Kazushi Sakuraba	TKO (Knees and Soccer Kicks)	1	1:38
	Tra Telligman	def.	Igor Vovchanchyn	Decision (Unanimous)	3	5:00
	Tadao Yasuda	def.	Masaaki Satake	Decision (Split)	3	5:00
	Mark Coleman	def.	Allan Goes	TKO (Knees)	1	1:19
	Dan Henderson	def.	Renzo Gracie	KO (Punch)	1	1:40
	Heath Herring	def.	Denis Sobolev	Submission (Keylock)	1	0:22
	Guy Mezger	def.	Egan Inoue	KO (Punch)	1	2:25
	Vitor Belfort	def.	Bobby Southworth	Submission (Rear-Naked Choke)	1	4:09

== Pride 14: Clash of the Titans ==
Pride 14
- Promotion: Pride Fighting Championships
- Date: May 27, 2001
- Venue: Yokohama Arena
- City: Yokohama

Event chronology
Pride 13	Pride 14	Pride 15

Pride 14: Clash of the Titans was an event held on May 27, 2001 at the Yokohama Arena in Yokohama, Japan.

=== Results ===
Main Card
Weight class				Method	Round	Time	Notes
	Kazuyuki Fujita	def.	Yoshihiro Takayama	Submission (Arm-Triangle Choke)	2	3:10
	Igor Vovchanchyn	def.	Gilbert Yvel	Submission (Rear-Naked Choke)	1	1:52
	Wanderlei Silva	def.	Shungo Oyama	TKO (Punches)	1	0:30
	Dan Henderson	def.	Akira Shoji	TKO (Punches and Knees)	3	3:18
	Vitor Belfort	def.	Heath Herring	Decision (Unanimous)	3	5:00
	Gary Goodridge	def.	Valentijn Overeem	TKO (Submission to Knee)	1	2:39
	Chuck Liddell	def.	Guy Mezger	KO (Punch)	2	0:21
	Daijiro Matsui	def.	Jose Landi-Jons	Decision (Unanimous)	3	5:00
	Antonio Schembri	def.	Johil de Oliveira	Submission (Armbar)	1	7:17

== Pride 15: Raging Rumble ==
Pride 15
- Promotion: Pride Fighting Championships
- Date: July 29, 2001
- Venue: Saitama Super Arena
- City: Saitama
- Attendance: 27,323

Event chronology
Pride 14	Pride 15	Pride 16

Pride 15: Raging Rumble was an event held on July 29, 2001 at the Saitama Super Arena Saitama Super Arena in Saitama, Japan. Future Pride and UFC legends Antônio Rodrigo Nogueira and Quinton Jackson made their Pride debuts at this event.

=== Results ===
Main Card
Weight class				Method	Round	Time	Notes
	Tokimitsu Ishizawa	def.	Ryan Gracie	TKO (Injury)	1	4:51
	Kazushi Sakuraba	def.	Quinton Jackson	Submission (Rear-Naked Choke)	1	5:41
	Antônio Rodrigo Nogueira	def.	Gary Goodridge	Submission (Triangle Choke)	1	2:37
	Heath Herring	def.	Mark Kerr	TKO (Knees)	2	4:56
	Igor Vovchanchyn	def.	Masaaki Satake	Decision (Unanimous)	3	5:00
	Ebenezer Fontes Braga	def.	Daijiro Matsui	Decision (Unanimous)	3	5:00
	Wallid Ismail	def.	Shungo Oyama	Technical Submission (Arm-Triangle Choke)	2	2:30
	Assuério Silva	def.	Valentijn Overeem	Submission (Heel Hook)	1	2:50

== Pride 16: Beasts from the East ==
Pride 16
- Promotion: Pride
- Date: September 24, 2001
- Venue: Osaka Castle Hall
- City: Osaka, Japan

Event chronology
Pride 15	Pride 16	Pride 17

Pride 16: Beasts from the East was an event held on September 24, 2001 at Osaka-jo Hall in Osaka, Japan.

=== Results ===
Main Card
Weight class				Method	Round	Time	Notes
	Antônio Rodrigo Nogueira	def.	Mark Coleman	Submission (Triangle Armbar)	1	6:10
	Don Frye	def.	Gilbert Yvel	DQ (Eye Gouging)	1	7:27
	Semmy Schilt	def.	Akira Shoji	KO (Knee and Punches)	1	8:19
	Ricardo Arona	def.	Guy Mezger	Decision (Split)	3	5:00
	Murilo Rua	def.	Daijiro Matsui	TKO (Soccer Kick and Stomps)	3	0:51
	Assuério Silva	def.	Yoshihisa Yamamoto	TKO (Punches)	1	0:11
	Gary Goodridge	def.	Yoshiaki Yatsu	TKO (Corner Stoppage)	1	3:03

== Pride 17: Championship Chaos ==
Pride 17
- Promotion: Pride Fighting Championships
- Date: November 3, 2001
- Venue: Tokyo Dome
- City: Tokyo

Event chronology
Pride 16	Pride 17	Pride 18

Pride 17: Championship Chaos was an event held on November 3, 2001 at the Tokyo Dome in Tokyo, Japan. This event saw the crowning of the first Pride FC Heavyweight and Middleweight champions. It also marked the debut of future Pride champion Mirko Cro Cop.

=== Results ===
Main Card
Weight class				Method	Round	Time	Notes
Middleweight	Wanderlei Silva	def.	Kazushi Sakuraba	TKO (Doctor Stoppage)	1	10:00	(Note: For The Pride Fighting Championship World Middleweight Championship. Sakuraba suffered a broken collarbone after being slammed by Silva.)
Heavyweight	Antônio Rodrigo Nogueira	def.	Heath Herring	Decision (Unanimous)	3	5:00	(Note: For The Pride Fighting Championship World Heavyweight Championship.)
	Mario Sperry	def.	Igor Vovchanchyn	Submission (Arm-Triangle Choke)	1	2:52
	Semmy Schilt	def.	Masaaki Satake	TKO (Front Kick and Punches)	1	2:18
	Dan Henderson	def.	Murilo Rua	Decision (Split)	3	5:00
	Quinton Jackson	def.	Yuki Ishikawa	KO (Punches)	1	1:52
	Renzo Gracie	def.	Michiyoshi Ohara	Decision (Unanimous)	3	5:00
Pride vs. K-1 Rules bouts
	Mirko Cro Cop	vs.	Nobuhiko Takada	Draw	5	3:00
	Tom Erikson	def.	Matt Skelton	Submission (Strangle Choke)	1	1:51

== Pride 18: Cold Fury 2 ==
Pride 18
- Promotion: Pride Fighting Championships
- Date: December 23, 2001
- Venue: Marine Messe Fukuoka
- City: Fukuoka

Event chronology
Pride 17	Pride 18	Pride: The Best Vol. 1

Pride 18: Cold Fury 2 was an event held on December 23, 2001 at the Marine Messe Fukuoka in Fukuoka, Japan.

=== Results ===
Main Card
Weight class				Method	Round	Time	Notes
	Semmy Schilt	def.	Yoshihiro Takayama	KO (Punches)	1	3:09
	Wanderlei Silva	def.	Alexander Otsuka	TKO (Doctor Stoppage)	3	2:22	(Note: Non-title bout)
	Jeremy Horn	def.	Akira Shoji	Decision (Unanimous)	3	5:00
	Igor Vovchanchyn	def.	Valentijn Overeem	Submission (Heel Hook)	1	4:35
	Murilo Rua	def.	Alex Andrade	Decision (Unanimous)	3	5:00
	Alex Stiebling	def.	Allan Goes	TKO (Knees and Punches)	3	0:47
	Daijiro Matsui	def.	Quinton Jackson	DQ (Knee to Groin)	1	0:14
Pride vs. K-1 Rules bout
	Yoshihisa Yamamoto	def.	Jan Nortje	Submission (Armbar)	1	1:43

== See also ==
- Pride Fighting Championships
- List of Pride Fighting Championships champions
- List of Pride Fighting events
