= List of mixed martial arts records =

This article lists records held by mixed martial arts (MMA) fighters.

== Fighting ==
=== Most bouts ===
Fighter	Fights
(United States) Travis Fulton	320
(United States) Shannon Ritch	150
(United States) Jay Ellis	129
(United States) Dan Severn	127
(United States) Jeremy Horn	120
(Japan) Yuki Kondo	117
(Japan) Ikuhisa Minowa	116
(England) Shaun Lomas	114
(United States) Bryan Robinson	110
(United States) Dennis Reed	109
(United States) Travis Wiuff	101
(United States) Tony Lopez	101
(Wales) Paul Jenkins	98
(Brazil) Arymarcel Santos	95
(United States) Shonie Carter	91
(United States) Adrian Serrano	89
(Japan) Keiichiro Yamamiya	90
(Japan) Osami Shibuya	89
(Japan) Takafumi Ito	89
(Russia) Jeff Monson	88
(Japan) Shunichi Shimizu	87
(Russia) Alexander Shlemenko	87

== Winning (active) ==
=== Longest current win streaks ===
Undefeated or unbeaten streaks still count, as it is a win streak regardless. Draws and no contests are not counted.
‘ = Unbeaten streak
^ = Win streak

Number	Fighter	Wins	Status
1	(Russia) Movlid Khaybulaev	24’	PFL
1	(Russia) Rinat Fakhretdinov	24^	Regional
3	(Russia) Usman Nurmagomedov	22’	PFL
4	(Russia) Movsar Evloev	20’	UFC
5	(Kyrgyzstan) Razhabali Shaydullaev	19’	RIZIN
5	(Ecuador) Michael Morales	19’	UFC
7	(Japan) Seika Izawa	18’	RIZIN
8	(England) Muhammad Mokaev	17’	Brave/WOW
8	(England) Phil De Fries	17^	KSW
8	(Russia) Islam Makhachev	17^	UFC
8	(Russia) Islam Omarov	17’	ACA
8	(Russia) Muslim Magomedov	17’	ACA
11	(Russia) Ramazan Gasanov	16’	NAIZA
11	(England) Dakota Ditcheva	16’	PFL
11	(Poland) Jakub Kaszuba	16’	PFL

== Winning (historical) ==
=== Most wins ===
Fighter	Wins
(United States) Travis Fulton	255
(United States) Dan Severn	101
(United States) Jeremy Horn	92
(United States) Travis Wiuff	78
(Russia) Alexander Shlemenko	68
(Japan) Yuki Kondo	67
(United States) Tony Lopez	65
(Brazil) Luis Santos	65
(Japan) Ikuhisa Minowa	63
(Russia) Alexey Oleynik	61
Jeff Monson	60

=== Longest submission streaks in history ===
This specific section covers the most consecutive wins by submission in mixed martial arts. For the earlier years of MMA, TKOs also included submissions to strikes, so that will be counted. Current streaks do not count.

Number	Fighter	Submissions	Status
1.	(Brazil) Royce Gracie	11	UFC
1.	(Brazil) Rickson Gracie	11	Regional; PRIDE FC; Vale Tudo Japan
2.	(United States) Travis Fulton	9	Regional
2.	(Russia) Aleksei Oleinik	9	Regional; KSW
3.	(Georgia (country)) (Spain) Ilia Topuria	7	Regional; Brave CF
3.	(United States) Grant Dawson	7	Regional
3.	(United States) Jordan Bochnovic	7	Regional; KOTC; Bellator MMA
4.	(Russia) Marat Gafurov	6	ONE
4.	(United States) Kyle Daukaus	6	Regional
4.	(Brazil) (United States) Robert Drysdale	6	AFC; Legacy FC
4.	(Kyrgyzstan) Razhabali Shaydullaev	6	Regional
5.	(Brazil) Demian Maia	5	UFC
5.	(Brazil) Alex Silva	5	ONE
5.	(Netherlands) Reinier de Ridder	5	Regional; ONE
5.	(United States) Tyron Woodley	5	Regional; Strikeforce
5.	(Brazil) Valter Walker	5	UFC

=== Longest undefeated streaks in history ===
Fighter	Wins
(United States) Travis Fulton	40
(Ukraine) Igor Vovchanchyn	40
(Brazil) Renan Barao	32
(Brazil) Luis Rafael Laurentino	31
Julio Cesar Neves Jr.	30
Khabib Nurmagomedov	29*
(United States) John Strawn	28
Fedor Emelianenko	27
(Ukraine) Yaroslav Amosov	27
(Cuba) Hector Lombard	25
(Russia) Vagab Vagabov	24
(United States) Dan Severn	24
Satoko Shinashi	23
(Russia) Khusein Askhabov	23
Jeremy Horn	22
Bas Rutten	22*
Denis Kang	22
Jason Black	22
Megumi Fujii	22
(Brazil) Douglas Silva de Andrade	22
Alexander Volkanovski	22
Weili Zhang	21

- “No Contests” ignored. * – Streak ended in retirement rather than in defeat

== Most losses ==
Fighter	Losses
(United States) Jay Ellis	112
Shannon Ritch	88
(England) Shaun Lomas	86
(United States) Bryan Robinson	65
(United States) Dennis Reed	63
(United States) Johnathan Ivey	58
(United States) Ted Worthington	57
(United States) Travis Fulton	54
(England) Craig Allen	53
(United States) Bruce Johnson	53
