= List of Pride FC events =

Mixed martial arts events

Below is a list of mixed martial arts events scheduled and held by the Pride Fighting Championships.

== Events ==
#	Event	Japanese name	Date held	Venue	City	Attendance
1	Pride 1	—N/a	October 11, 1997	Tokyo Dome	Tokyo, Japan	47,000
2	Pride 2	—N/a	March 15, 1998	Yokohama Arena	Yokohama, Kanagawa, Japan	6,000
3	Pride 3	—N/a	June 24, 1998	Nippon Budokan	Tokyo, Japan	4,500
4	Pride 4	—N/a	October 11, 1998	Tokyo Dome	Tokyo, Japan	36,354
5	Pride 5	—N/a	April 29, 1999	Nagoya Rainbow Hall	Nagoya, Aichi, Japan	4,000
6	Pride 6	—N/a	July 4, 1999	Yokohama Arena	Yokohama, Kanagawa, Japan	12,580
7	Pride 7	—N/a	September 12, 1999	Yokohama Arena	Yokohama, Kanagawa, Japan	10,031
8	Pride 8	—N/a	November 21, 1999	Ariake Coliseum	Tokyo, Japan	10,036
9	Pride Grand Prix 2000 Opening Round	—N/a	January 30, 2000	Tokyo Dome	Tokyo, Japan	48,316
10	Pride Grand Prix 2000 Finals	—N/a	May 1, 2000	Tokyo Dome	Tokyo, Japan	38,429
11	Pride 9	—N/a	June 4, 2000	Nagoya Rainbow Hall	Nagoya, Aichi, Japan	6,000
12	Pride 10	—N/a	August 27, 2000	Seibu Dome	Saitama, Japan	35,000
13	Pride 11	—N/a	October 31, 2000	Osaka-jo Hall	Osaka, Japan	13,500
14	Pride 12	—N/a	December 23, 2000	Saitama Super Arena	Saitama, Japan	26,882
15	Pride 13	—N/a	March 25, 2001	Saitama Super Arena	Saitama, Japan	27,000
16	Pride 14	—N/a	May 27, 2001	Yokohama Arena	Yokohama, Kanagawa, Japan	15,326
17	Pride 15	—N/a	July 29, 2001	Saitama Super Arena	Saitama, Japan	27,323
18	Pride 16	—N/a	September 24, 2001	Osaka-jo Hall	Osaka, Japan	14,907
19	Pride 17	—N/a	November 3, 2001	Tokyo Dome	Tokyo, Japan	53,200
20	Pride 18	—N/a	December 23, 2001	Marine Messe Fukuoka	Fukuoka, Japan	9,336
21	Pride FC: The Best, Vol.1	—N/a	February 22, 2002	Korakuen Hall	Tokyo, Japan	2,000
22	Pride 19	—N/a	February 24, 2002	Saitama Super Arena	Saitama, Japan	22,380
23	Pride 20	—N/a	April 28, 2002	Yokohama Arena	Yokohama, Kanagawa, Japan	18,926
24	Pride 21	—N/a	June 23, 2002	Saitama Super Arena	Saitama, Japan	22,586
25	Pride FC: The Best, Vol.2	—N/a	July 20, 2002	Differ Ariake Arena	Tokyo, Japan	—N/a
26	Pride Shockwave	Dynamite!	August 28, 2002	Tokyo National Stadium	Tokyo, Japan	91,107
27	Pride 22	—N/a	September 29, 2002	Nagoya Rainbow Hall	Nagoya, Aichi, Japan	9,391
28	Pride FC: The Best, Vol. 3	—N/a	October 20, 2002	Differ Ariake Arena	Tokyo, Japan	—N/a
29	Pride 23	—N/a	November 24, 2002	Tokyo Dome	Tokyo, Japan	52,228
30	Pride 24	—N/a	December 23, 2002	Marine Messe Fukuoka	Fukuoka, Japan	8,543
31	Pride 25	—N/a	March 16, 2003	Yokohama Arena	Yokohama, Kanagawa, Japan	19,247
32	Pride 26	Reborn	June 8, 2003	Yokohama Arena	Yokohama, Kanagawa, Japan	17,187
33	Pride Total Elimination 2003	Kaimakusen	August 10, 2003	Saitama Super Arena	Saitama, Japan	40,316
34	Pride Bushido 1	—N/a	October 5, 2003	Saitama Super Arena	Saitama, Japan	12,340
35	Pride Final Conflict 2003	Ketsushosen	November 9, 2003	Tokyo Dome	Tokyo, Japan	67,451
36	Pride Shockwave 2003	Otoko Matsuri	December 31, 2003	Saitama Super Arena	Saitama, Japan	39,716
37	Pride 27	Triumphal Return	February 1, 2004	Osaka-jo Hall	Osaka, Japan	13,366
38	Pride Bushido 2	—N/a	February 15, 2004	Yokohama Arena	Yokohama, Kanagawa, Japan	14,117
39	Pride Total Elimination 2004	1st Round	April 25, 2004	Saitama Super Arena	Saitama, Japan	42,110
40	Pride Bushido 3	—N/a	May 23, 2004	Yokohama Arena	Yokohama, Kanagawa, Japan	14,536
41	Pride Critical Countdown 2004	2nd Round	June 20, 2004	Saitama Super Arena	Saitama, Japan	43,711
42	Pride Bushido 4	—N/a	July 19, 2004	Nagoya Rainbow Hall	Nagoya, Aichi, Japan	10,892
43	Pride Final Conflict 2004	Final Round	August 15, 2004	Saitama Super Arena	Saitama, Japan	47,629
44	Pride Bushido 5	—N/a	October 14, 2004	Osaka Castle Hall	Osaka, Japan	—N/a
45	Pride 28	—N/a	October 31, 2004	Saitama Super Arena	Saitama, Japan	24,028
46	Pride Shockwave 2004	Otoko Matsuri - Sadame	December 31, 2004	Saitama Super Arena	Saitama, Japan	48,398
47	Pride 29	Survival	February 20, 2005	Saitama Super Arena	Saitama, Japan	22,047
48	Pride Bushido 6	—N/a	April 3, 2005	Yokohama Arena	Yokohama, Kanagawa, Japan	8,000
49	Pride Total Elimination 2005	Kaimakusen	April 23, 2005	Osaka Dome	Osaka, Japan	45,423
50	Pride Bushido 7	—N/a	May 22, 2005	Ariake Coliseum	Tokyo, Japan	8,861
51	Pride Critical Countdown 2005	2nd Round	June 26, 2005	Saitama Super Arena	Saitama, Japan	35,000
52	Pride Bushido 8	—N/a	July 17, 2005	Nagoya Rainbow Hall	Nagoya, Aichi, Japan	9,784
53	Pride Final Conflict 2005	Ketsushosen	August 28, 2005	Saitama Super Arena	Saitama, Japan	35,000
54	Pride Bushido 9	The Tournament	September 25, 2005	Ariake Coliseum	Tokyo, Japan	10,775
55	Pride 30	Starting Over	October 23, 2005	Saitama Super Arena	Saitama, Japan	23,776
56	Pride Shockwave 2005	Otokomatsuri - Itadaki	December 31, 2005	Saitama Super Arena	Saitama, Japan	49,801
57	Pride 31	Unbreakable	February 26, 2006	Saitama Super Arena	Saitama, Japan	22,141
58	Pride Bushido 10	—N/a	April 2, 2006	Ariake Coliseum	Tokyo, Japan	9,313
59	Pride Total Elimination Absolute	—N/a	May 5, 2006	Osaka Dome	Osaka, Japan	43,000
60	Pride Bushido Survival 2006	—N/a	June 4, 2006	Saitama Super Arena	Saitama, Japan	7,500
61	Pride Critical Countdown Absolute	—N/a	July 1, 2006	Saitama Super Arena	Saitama, Japan	34,000
62	Pride Bushido 12	2nd Round	August 27, 2006	Nagoya Rainbow Hall	Nagoya, Aichi, Japan	9,952
63	Pride Final Conflict Absolute	—N/a	September 10, 2006	Saitama Super Arena	Saitama, Japan	35,000
64	Pride 32	—N/a	October 21, 2006	Thomas & Mack Center	Las Vegas, Nevada, United States	11,727
65	Pride Bushido 13	—N/a	November 5, 2006	Yokohama Arena	Yokohama, Kanagawa, Japan	8,000
66	Pride Shockwave 2006	Otoko Matsuri - Fumetsu	December 31, 2006	Saitama Super Arena	Saitama, Japan	48,709
67	Pride 33	—N/a	February 24, 2007	Thomas & Mack Center	Las Vegas, Nevada, United States	12,911
68	Pride 34	—N/a	April 8, 2007	Saitama Super Arena	Saitama, Japan	23,336

== Event locations ==
Seven cities in two countries have hosted a total of 68 events:

- Japan (66)

Saitama – 25
Tokyo – 16
Yokohama – 11
Nagoya – 6
Osaka – 6
Fukuoka – 2

- United States (2)

Las Vegas, Nevada – 2

== See also ==
- List of Pride champions
- List of Pride FC fighters
- List of K-1 events
- List of Bellator MMA events
- List of DREAM events
- List of EliteXC events
- List of Invicta FC events
- List of ONE Championship events
- List of Pancrase events
- List of PFL/WSOF events
- List of Shooto Events
- List of Strikeforce events
- List of UFC events
- List of WEC events
