= 1999 in Pride FC =

Mixed martial arts events

Information
- First date: April 29, 1999
- Last date: November 21, 1999

Events
- Total events: 4

Fights
- Total fights: 28

Chronology
1998 in Pride	1999 in Pride FC	2000 in Pride

The year 1999 was the 3rd year in the history of the Pride Fighting Championships, a mixed martial arts promotion based in Japan. 1999 had 4 events beginning with, Pride 5.

== Debut Pride FC fighters ==
The following fighters fought their first Pride FC fight in 1999:

- Anthony Macias
- Bob Schrijber
- Carl Ognibene
- Carlos Barreto
- Ebenezer Fontes Braga
- Egan Inoue
- Enson Inoue
- Fabiano Iha
- Francisco Bueno
- Frank Trigg
- Guy Mezger
- Hiroki Kurosawa
- Larry Parker
- Mark Coleman
- Maurice Smith
- Minoru Toyonaga
- Naoya Ogawa
- Nobuaki Kakuda
- Ricardo Morais
- Soichi Nishida
- Tom Erikson
- Tully Kulihaapai
- Vitor Belfort
- Wanderlei Silva

== Events list ==
#	Event	Japanese name	Date held	Venue	City	Attendance
8	Pride 8	—N/a	November 21, 1999	Ariake Coliseum	Tokyo, Japan	—N/a
7	Pride 7	—N/a	September 12, 1999	Yokohama Arena	Yokohama, Japan	10,031
6	Pride 6	—N/a	July 4, 1999	Yokohama Arena	Yokohama, Japan	—N/a
5	Pride 5	—N/a	April 29, 1999	Nagoya Rainbow Hall	Nagoya, Japan	—N/a

== Pride 5 ==
Pride 5
- Promotion: Pride Fighting Championships
- Date: April 29, 1999
- Venue: Nippon Gaishi Hall
- City: Nagoya

Event chronology
Pride 4	Pride 5	Pride 6

Pride 5 was an event held on April 29, 1999, at The Nagoya Rainbow Hall in Nagoya, Japan.

=== Results ===
Main card
Weight class				Method	Round	Time	Notes
	(Japan) Nobuhiko Takada	def.	(United States) Mark Coleman	Submission (heel hook)	2	1:44	(Note: Acknowledged by Coleman to have been a worked fight.)
	(Japan) Kazushi Sakuraba	def.	(Brazil) Vitor Belfort	Decision (unanimous)	2	10:00
	(United States) Enson Inoue	def.	(Japan) Soichi Nishida	Submission (rear-naked choke)	1	0:24
	(Ukraine) Igor Vovchanchyn	def.	(Japan) Akira Shoji	Decision (unanimous)	2	10:00
	(Brazil) Francisco Bueno	def.	(Japan) Satoshi Honma	TKO (punches)	1	4:59
	(United States) Egan Inoue	def.	(Japan) Minoru Toyonaga	TKO (punches)	1	5:53

== Pride 6 ==
Pride 6
- Promotion: Pride Fighting Championships
- Date: July 4, 1999
- Venue: Yokohama Arena
- City: Yokohama

Event chronology
Pride 5	Pride 6	Pride 7

Pride 6 was an event held on July 4, 1999, at The Yokohama Arena in Yokohama, Japan.

=== Results ===
Main card
Weight class				Method	Round	Time	Notes
	(United States) Mark Kerr	def.	(Japan) Nobuhiko Takada	Submission (kimura)	1	3:04
	(Japan) Kazushi Sakuraba	def.	(Brazil) Ebenezer Fontes Braga	Submission (armbar)	1	9:23
	(Japan) Naoya Ogawa	def.	(Trinidad and Tobago) Gary Goodridge	Submission (keylock)	2	0:36
	(Japan) Akira Shoji	def.	(United States) Guy Mezger	Decision (split)	3	5:00
	(Japan) Hiroki Kurosawa	def.	(Japan) Nobuaki Kakuda	Decision	5	3:00	(Note: Kyokushin Karate bout.)
	(Ukraine) Igor Vovchanchyn	def.	(Brazil) Carlos Barreto	Decision (split)	3	5:00
	(Canada) Carlos Newton	def.	(Japan) Daijiro Matsui	Decision (unanimous)	3	5:00
	(United States) Carl Malenko	def.	(United States) Egan Inoue	Decision (unanimous)	3	5:00

== Pride 7 ==
Pride 7
- Promotion: Pride Fighting Championships
- Date: September 12, 1999
- Venue: Yokohama Arena
- City: Yokohama
- Attendance: 10,031

Event chronology
Pride 6	Pride 7	Pride 8

Pride 7 was an event held on September 12, 1999, at The Yokohama Arena in Yokohama, Japan.

=== Results ===
Main Card
Weight class				Method	Round	Time	Notes
	(Japan) Daijiro Matsui	def.	(Netherlands) Bob Schrijber	DQ (illegal kick)	1	10:00	(Note: Matsui defeated Schrijber via DQ (illegal kick) at 10:00 of round 1. Schrijber delivered an axe kick to the back of Matsui's head after the bell.)
	(Brazil) Wanderlei Silva	def.	(United States) Carl Malenko	Decision (unanimous)	2	10:00
	(United States) Maurice Smith	def.	(Croatia) Branko Cikatic	Submission (forearm choke)	1	7:33
	(Japan) Akira Shoji	def.	(United States) Larry Parker	Decision (unanimous)	3	5:00
	(Japan) Kazushi Sakuraba	def.	(United States) Anthony Macias	Submission (armbar)	2	2:30
	(Ukraine) Igor Vovchanchyn	vs.	(United States) Mark Kerr	No Contest	2	4:36	(Note: Initially ruled a win for Vovchanchyn, the result was changed to a "no contest" due to illegal knee strikes by Vovchanchyn.)
Grappling match
	(United States) Enson Inoue	def.	(Tonga) Tully Kulihaapai	Submission (armbar)	1	1:15
Pro wrestling match
	(Japan) Nobuhiko Takada	def.	(Japan) Alexander Otsuka	TKO	2	1:32

== Pride 8 ==
Pride 8
- Promotion: Pride Fighting Championships
- Date: November 21, 1999
- Venue: Ariake Coliseum
- City: Tokyo

Event chronology
Pride 7	Pride 8	Pride: Grand Prix 2000 - Opening Round

Pride 8 was an event held on November 21, 1999, at The Ariake Coliseum in Tokyo, Japan.

=== Results ===
Main Card
Weight class				Method	Round	Time	Notes
	(Brazil) Wanderlei Silva	def.	(Japan) Daijiro Matsui	Unanimous Decision	2	10:00
	(United States) Frank Trigg	def.	(Brazil) Fabiano Iha	TKO (Punches)	1	5:00
	(Brazil) Allan Goes	def.	(United States) Carl Malenko	Submission (Arm-Triangle Choke)	1	9:16
	(United States) Mark Coleman	def.	(Brazil) Ricardo Morais	Unanimous Decision	2	10:00
	(United States) Tom Erikson	def.	(Trinidad and Tobago) Gary Goodridge	Unanimous Decision	2	10:00
	(Ukraine) Igor Vovchanchyn	def.	(Brazil) Francisco Bueno	KO (Punch)	1	1:23
	(Brazil) Renzo Gracie	def.	(Japan) Alexander Otsuka	Unanimous Decision	2	10:00
	(Japan) Kazushi Sakuraba	def.	(Brazil) Royler Gracie	Technical Submission (Kimura)	2	13:16	(Note: This marked the first time a member of the Gracie Family had been defeated in a mixed martial arts bout.)

== See also ==
- Pride Fighting Championships
- List of Pride Fighting Championships champions
- List of Pride Fighting events
