= 2003 in Pride FC =

Mixed martial arts events

Information
- First date: March 16, 2003
- Last date: December 31, 2003

Events
- Total events: 6

Fights
- Total fights: 51
- Title fights: 2

Chronology
2002 in Pride	2003 in Pride FC	2004 in Pride

The year 2003 was the 7th year in the history of the Pride Fighting Championships, a mixed martial arts promotion based in Japan. 2003 had 6 events beginning with, Pride 25 - Body Blow.

== Title fights ==
Title fights in 2003
Weight class				Method	Round	Time	Event	Notes
Heavyweight	Fedor Emelianenko	def.	Antônio Rodrigo Nogueira	Decision (Unanimous)	3	5:00	Pride 25: Body Blow	(Note: For the Pride Fighting Championship World Heavyweight Championship.)
Heavyweight	Antônio Rodrigo Nogueira	def.	Mirko Cro Cop	Submission (Armbar)	2	1:45	Pride Final Conflict 2003	(Note: For the Interim Pride Heavyweight Championship.)

== Debut Pride FC fighters ==
The following fighters fought their first Pride FC fight in 2003:

- Alberto Rodriguez
- Aleksander Emelianenko
- Chalid Arrab
- Chris Brennan
- Dan Bobish
- Dokonjonosuke Mishima
- Hayato Sakurai
- Ikuhisa Minowa
- Jason Suttie
- Kazuhiro Hamanaka
- Kazuhiro Nakamura
- Maurício Rua
- Mike Bencic
- Mikhail Ilyukhin
- Murilo Bustamante
- Paulo Cesar Silva
- Ralph Gracie
- Rodney Glunder
- Rodrigo Gracie
- Rony Sefo
- Sergei Kharitonov
- Wataru Sakata
- Yuki Kondo

== Events list ==
#	Event	Japanese name	Date held	Venue	City	Attendance
36	Pride FC - Shockwave 2003	Otoko Matsuri	December 31, 2003	Saitama Super Arena	Saitama, Japan	39,716
35	Pride FC - Final Conflict 2003	Ketsushosen	November 9, 2003	Tokyo Dome	Tokyo, Japan	67,451
34	Pride FC - Bushido 1	—N/a	October 5, 2003	Saitama Super Arena	Saitama, Japan	—N/a
33	Pride FC - Total Elimination 2003	Kaimakusen	August 10, 2003	Saitama Super Arena	Saitama, Japan	40,316
32	Pride 26 - Bad to the Bone	Reborn	June 8, 2003	Yokohama Arena	Yokohama, Japan	—N/a
31	Pride 25 - Body Blow	—N/a	March 16, 2003	Yokohama Arena	Yokohama, Japan	—N/a

== Pride 25: Body Blow ==
Pride 25
- Promotion: Pride Fighting Championships
- Date: March 16, 2003
- Venue: Yokohama Arena
- City: Yokohama, Japan
- Attendance: 19,247

Event chronology
Pride 24	Pride 25	Pride 26

Pride 25: Body Blow was an event held on March 16, 2003, at the Yokohama Arena in Yokohama, Japan.

=== Results ===
Main Card
Weight class				Method	Round	Time	Notes
Heavyweight	Fedor Emelianenko	def.	Antônio Rodrigo Nogueira	Decision (Unanimous)	3	5:00	(Note: For the Pride Fighting Championship World Heavyweight Championship.)
	Quinton Jackson	def.	Kevin Randleman	KO (knee and punches)	1	6:58	(Note: No. 1 Contender bout)
	Antônio Schembri	def.	Kazushi Sakuraba	TKO (Knees and soccer kicks)	1	6:15
	Dan Henderson	def.	Shungo Oyama	TKO (Punches)	1	3:28
	Anderson Silva	def.	Carlos Newton	KO (Flying Knee and Punches)	1	6:27
	Alexander Otsuka	def.	Kenichi Yamamoto	Decision (Unanimous)	3	5:00
	Akira Shoji	def.	Alex Stiebling	Decision (Split)	3	5:00
	Antônio Rogério Nogueira	def.	Kazuhiro Nakamura	Submission (Armbar)	2	3:49

== Pride 26: Bad to the Bone ==
Pride 26
- Promotion: Pride Fighting Championships
- Date: June 8, 2003
- Venue: Yokohama Arena
- City: Yokohama, Japan

Event chronology
Pride 25	Pride 26	Pride: Total Elimination 2003

Pride 26: Bad to the Bone was an event held on June 8, 2003, at the Yokohama Arena in Yokohama, Japan.

=== Results ===
Main Card
Weight class				Method	Round	Time	Notes
	Fedor Emelianenko	def.	Kazuyuki Fujita	Submission (Rear-Naked Choke)	1	4:17	(Note: Non-Title bout)
	Mirko Cro Cop	def.	Heath Herring	TKO (Kick to the Body and Punches)	1	3:17
	Mark Coleman	def.	Don Frye	Decision (Unanimous)	3	5:00
	Quinton Jackson	def.	Mikhail Ilyukhin	Submission (Knee to the Body)	1	6:26
	Alistair Overeem	def.	Mike Bencic	TKO (Submission to Knee to the Body and Punches)	1	3:44
	Daiju Takase	def.	Anderson Silva	Submission (Triangle Choke)	1	8:33
	Kazuhiro Hamanaka	def.	Antônio Schembri	Decision (Unanimous)	3	5:00

== Pride FC: Total Elimination 2003 ==
Pride: Total Elimination 2003
- Promotion: Pride Fighting Championships
- Date: August 10, 2003
- Venue: Saitama Super Arena
- City: Saitama, Japan
- Attendance: 40,316

Event chronology
Pride 26	Pride: Total Elimination 2003	Pride: Bushido 1

Pride FC: Total Elimination 2003 was an event held on August 10, 2003, at the Saitama Super Arena in Saitama, Japan.

=== Results ===
Main Card
Weight class				Method	Round	Time	Notes
	Wanderlei Silva	def.	Kazushi Sakuraba	KO (Punch)	1	5:01	(Note: Quarterfinal bout)
	Hidehiko Yoshida	def.	Kiyoshi Tamura	Submission (Ezekiel Choke)	1	5:06	(Note: Quarterfinal bout)
	Mirko Cro Cop	def.	Igor Vovchanchyn	KO (Head Kick)	1	1:29
	Antônio Rodrigo Nogueira	def.	Ricco Rodriguez	Decision (Unanimous)	3	5:00
	Quinton Jackson	def.	Murilo Bustamante	Decision (Split)	3	5:00	(Note: Quarterfinal bout)
	Chuck Liddell	def.	Alistair Overeem	KO (Punches)	1	3:09	(Note: Quarterfinal bout)
	Fedor Emelianenko	def.	Gary Goodridge	TKO (soccer kicks/punches)	1	1:09	(Note: Non-Title Bout)

=== Pride 2003 Middleweight Grand Prix bracket ===
Quarter-finals
(United States) Chuck Liddell	KO
(Netherlands) Alistair Overeem	3:09
(United States) Quinton Jackson	SD
(Brazil) Murilo Bustamante	20:00
(Japan) Hidehiko Yoshida	SUB
(Japan) Kiyoshi Tamura	5:06
(Brazil) Wanderlei Silva	KO
(Japan) Kazushi Sakuraba	5:01

Semi-finals
(United States) Chuck Liddell
(United States) Quinton Jackson
(Japan) Hidehiko Yoshida
(Brazil) Wanderlei Silva

Final
(United States) Quinton Jackson
(Brazil) Wanderlei Silva

== Pride FC: Bushido 1 ==
Pride: Bushido 1
- Promotion: Pride Fighting Championships
- Date: October 5, 2003
- Venue: Saitama Super Arena
- City: Saitama

Event chronology
Pride: Total Elimination 2003	Pride: Bushido 1	Pride: Final Conflict 2003

Pride FC: Bushido 1 Is an event held by the Pride Fighting Championships at the Saitama Super Arena in Saitama, Japan on October 5, 2003. The card was billed as Team Japan Vs. Team Gracie, with five bouts featuring a Japanese fighter represented by Hidehiko Yoshida and a member of the Gracie family represented by Royce Gracie. In the main event, Dos Caras, Jr. became the first Hispanic fighter to compete in Pride and the first to wear a lucha libre mask during a bout. He is now better known as WWE pro wrestler Alberto Del Rio.

=== Results ===
Main Card
Weight class				Method	Round	Time	Notes
	Mirko Cro Cop	def.	Alberto Rodriguez	KO (Head Kick)	1	0:46
	Alexander Emelianenko	def.	Assuério Silva	Decision (Split)	2	5:00
	Maurício Rua	def.	Akira Shoji	KO (Punches)	1	3:47
	Ryan Gracie	def.	Kazuhiro Hamanaka	TKO (Soccer Kicks)	1	7:37
	Rodrigo Gracie	def.	Daiju Takase	Decision (Unanimous)	2	5:00
	Kazuhiro Nakamura	def.	Daniel Gracie	Decision (Unanimous)	2	5:00
	Ralph Gracie	def.	Dokonjonosuke Mishima	Decision (Unanimous)	2	5:00
	Carlos Newton	def.	Renzo Gracie	Decision (Split)	2	5:00
	Sergei Kharitonov	def.	Jason Suttie	Submission (Armbar)	1	2:25
	Chalid Arrab	def.	Rodney Glunder	Decision (Unanimous)	2	5:00
	Chris Brennan	def.	Eiji Mitsuoka	Submission (Kimura)	1	4:31	(Note: There was a lengthy pause a couple of minutes into the fight when Brennan released an armbar, believing that Mitsuoka had tapped out. Confusion ensued amongst both camps and the officials, and with replays inconclusive, the fight was eventually restarted.)

== Pride FC: Final Conflict 2003 ==
Pride: Final Conflict 2003
- Promotion: Pride
- Date: November 9, 2003
- Venue: Tokyo Dome
- City: Tokyo, Japan
- Attendance: 67,450

Event chronology
Pride: Bushido 1	Pride: Final Conflict 2003	Pride: Shockwave 2003

Pride FC: Final Conflict 2003 was an event held on November 9, 2003, at the Tokyo Dome in Tokyo, Japan. This event was host to the semi-finals and finals of the 2003 Pride Middleweight Grand Prix tournament. The first round of the tournament was contested at the Pride: Total Elimination 2003 event the previous August.

=== Results ===
Main Card
Weight class				Method	Round	Time	Notes
	Wanderlei Silva	def.	Quinton Jackson	TKO (Knees)	1	6:28	(Note: Finals bout)
Heavyweight	Antônio Rodrigo Nogueira	def.	Mirko Cro Cop	Submission (Armbar)	2	1:45	(Note: For the Interim Pride Heavyweight Championship.)
	Kazushi Sakuraba	def.	Kevin Randleman	Submission (Armbar)	3	2:36
	Heath Herring	def.	Yoshihisa Yamamoto	Submission (Rear-Naked Choke)	3	2:29
	Dan Henderson	def.	Murilo Bustamante	TKO (Punches)	1	0:53	(Note: Reserve bout)
	Wanderlei Silva	def.	Hidehiko Yoshida	Decision (Unanimous)	2	5:00	(Note: Semifinal bout)
	Quinton Jackson	def.	Chuck Liddell	TKO (Corner Stoppage)	2	3:10	(Note: Semifinal bout)
	Gary Goodridge	def.	Dan Bobish	TKO (Punches)	1	0:18

=== Pride 2003 Middleweight Grand Prix bracket ===
Quarter-finals
(United States) Chuck Liddell	KO
(Netherlands) Alistair Overeem	3:09
(United States) Quinton Jackson	DD
(Brazil) Murilo Bustamante	20:00
(Japan) Hidehiko Yoshida	SUB
(Japan) Kiyoshi Tamura	5:06
(Brazil) Wanderlei Silva	KO
(Japan) Kazushi Sakuraba	5:01

Semi-finals
(United States) Chuck Liddell	13:10
(United States) Quinton Jackson	TKO
(Japan) Hidehiko Yoshida	15:00
(Brazil) Wanderlei Silva	UD

Final
(United States) Quinton Jackson	6:28
(Brazil) Wanderlei Silva	TKO

== Pride FC: Shockwave 2003 ==
Pride: Shockwave 2003
- Promotion: Pride Fighting Championships
- Date: December 31, 2003
- Venue: Saitama Super Arena
- City: Saitama
- Attendance: 39,716

Event chronology
Pride: Final Conflict 2003	Pride: Shockwave 2003	Pride 27

Pride FC: Shockwave 2003 was an event held on December 31, 2003, at the Saitama Super Arena in Saitama, Japan.

=== Results ===
Main Card
Weight class				Method	Round	Time	Notes
	Antônio Rogério Nogueira	def.	Kazushi Sakuraba	Decision (Unanimous)	3	5:00
	Kiyoshi Tamura	def.	Rony Sefo	Submission (Armbar)	1	2:20
	Yuki Kondo	def.	Mario Sperry	TKO (Doctor Stoppage)	1	3:27
	Daniel Gracie	def.	Wataru Sakata	Submission (Armbar)	1	7:12
	Gary Goodridge	def.	Don Frye	KO (Head Kick)	1	0:39
	Royce Gracie	vs.	Hidehiko Yoshida	Draw	2	10:00
	Murilo Rua	def.	Akira Shoji	KO (Flying Knee)	1	2:24
	Hayato Sakurai	def.	Daiju Takase	Decision (Unanimous)	3	5:00
	Heath Herring	def.	Paulo Cesar Silva	Submission (Rear-Naked Choke)	3	0:35
	Quinton Jackson	def.	Ikuhisa Minowa	TKO (Punches)	2	1:05

== See also ==
- Pride Fighting Championships
- List of Pride Fighting Championships champions
- List of Pride Fighting events
