= Superman punch =

Technique in Muay Thai, kickboxing, and mixed martial arts

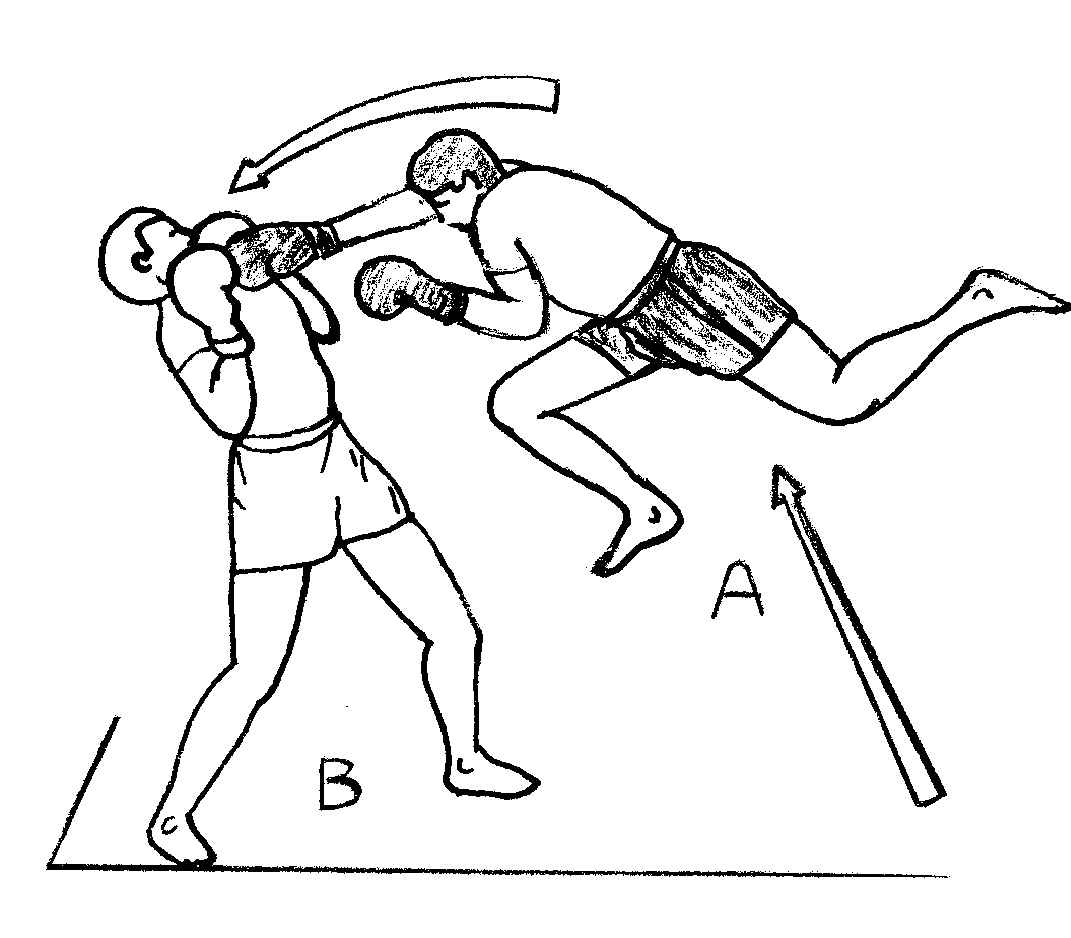
- Superman punch in Burmese boxing
- Focus: Striking

A superman punch is a technique used in Sanda, Lethwei, Muay Thai, ITF-style Taekwondo, kickboxing, mixed martial arts fighting and professional wrestling. The technique involves bringing the rear leg forward to feign a kick, then snapping the leg back while throwing a cross, resulting in greater power behind the punch.

Superman punches are allowed in boxing as long as they are performed in a proper way and targeted above the belt. The technique adds extra power to the punch, but is not commonly used by world-class boxers because it is easy to anticipate.

The move is also known as the Cobra Punch, Jumping Punch, and Diving Punch.

A superman punch in mixed martial arts was performed by Bas Rutten at UFC 20 against Kevin Randleman.

A variation involves pushing off from the fence with the opposite foot prior to the punch.

NHL hockey player and later Hockey Night In Canada analyst Kevin Bieksa is known for performing a variation on skates.

Professional wrestler Roman Reigns uses Superman Punch as his signature move.

The move was performed by the fictional character Superman in the film Superman Returns, which popularized the name 'Superman Punch' as a name for the attack.

== See also ==
- Martial arts
- Strike
- Hand-to-hand combat
- Kick

== Bibliography ==
- Blanchet, G., Boxe et sports de combat en éducation physique, Ed. Chiron, Paris, 1947
- Delmas, A., 1. Lexique de la boxe et des autres boxes, Document de formation d’entraîneur, 1981-2005 – 2. Lexique de combatique, Ligue Midi-Pyrénées, 1975–1980.
- Dempsey, J., Championship fighting, Ed. Jack Cuddy, 1950
- Lerda, L., Casteyre, J.C., Sachons boxer, Ed. Vigot, Paris, 1944
- Petit, M., Boxe, Paris, Ed. Amphora, Paris, 1972
