= Guy Mezger =

American mixed martial arts fighter

- Born: January 1, 1968 (age 58); Houston, Texas, U.S.
- Other names: The Sandman
- Height: 6 ft 1 in (185 cm)
- Weight: 200 lb (91 kg; 14 st 4 lb)
- Division: Light Heavyweight (205 lb); Heavyweight
- Style: Shootfighting, Taekwondo, Boxing, Wrestling, Judo,
- Fighting out of: Dallas, Texas
- Team: Lion's Den Dallas
- Rank: 8th Dan Black Belt in Taekwondo; 1st dan Black Belt in Judo; Black Belt in Brazilian Jiu-Jitsu
- Years active: 1994–2003 (MMA)

Kickboxing record
- Total: 25
- Wins: 22
- By knockout: 19
- Losses: 3

Mixed martial arts record
- Total: 45
- Wins: 30
- By knockout: 11
- By submission: 6
- By decision: 13
- Losses: 13
- By knockout: 4
- By submission: 3
- By decision: 5
- By disqualification: 1
- Draws: 2

Full contact karate record
- Total: 43
- Wins: 42
- By knockout: 40
- Losses: 1

Other information
- Boxing record from BoxRec
- Mixed martial arts record from Sherdog

Guy Mezger (born January 1, 1968) is an American martial artist, who competed in professional combat sports including sport karate (he is in the Sport Karate Museum Hall of Fame) full contact karate, kickboxing, and boxing, but is most recognized as a mixed martial arts (MMA) fighter. Mezger retired from professional competition on January 25, 2005. He is associated with Lion's Den and runs their school in Dallas. Mezger was a champion in mixed martial arts in two different promotions, the UFC and Pancrase. He holds wins over Tito Ortiz, Masakatsu Funaki, Yuki Kondo, Semmy Schilt, and Minoru Suzuki.

Mezger has trained with many great martial arts competitors and trainer/instructors; his main trainers have been Vince Tamura (judo), Willie Thompson (wrestling), Billy "Jack" Jackson (kickboxing), and Ken Shamrock (shootfighting). Mezger has co-written a book, The Complete Idiot's Guide to Kickboxing; he had an uncredited speaking role in the first-season episode of Walker, Texas Ranger titled "Night of the Gladiator".

== Early life ==
Born in Houston and raised in Dallas, Mezger wrestled in high school and also practiced taekwondo, in which he holds a 7th degree black belt. As a professional kickboxer, he won the U.S. Heavyweight title before winning the WKC World Heavyweight Championship in June 1995; a title he defended once before retiring from the sport to compete in Pancrase.

== Mixed martial arts career ==
=== Ultimate Fighting Championship and Pancrase ===
Mezger began his mixed martial arts career in the Ultimate Fighting Championship at UFC 4 in an alternate match against Jason Fairn. Before the fight, Mezger had asked Fairn to make a 'gentlemen's agreement' not to pull hair due to the fact both men had long hair. Mezger won the bout by TKO after landing a multitude of strikes from full mount. Mezger next fought at UFC 5 in an alternate match against John Dowdy, defeating him by TKO in little over two minutes by mounted strikes. Mezger began to train with Ken Shamrock and became a member of Ken's submission fighting team, the Lion's Den, and joined the Pancrase organization in Japan.

In his second match at the Pancrase 1995 Anniversary Show, Mezger faced Pancrase co-founder and Shamrock's trainer Masakatsu Funaki. The American fighter performed well, scoring high kicks and forcing Funaki to pull guard and work from the bottom, but he was eventually caught in a leglock exchange from his own trip and submitted with an Achilles lock.

In December 1995, Mezger was involved in a controversial match against the other Pancrase co-founder, lauded wrestler Minoru Suzuki. Mezger controlled the match, but he landed an accidental kick to the groin at 7:15 in the first round and was disqualified by the referee. His corner protested and defended the accidental nature of the strike, but the result was not changed. Guy's personal record shows it as a no contest.

Nonetheless, Mezger accumulated a Pancrase 16–7–2 record and become the 7th ever King of Pancrase world champion with a win over Masakatsu Funaki.

Mezger would not return to the UFC until UFC 13 where he competed in the Lightweight Tournament (200 lbs & under). In his first bout, Mezger fought top ranked judo fighter, Christophe Leininger. Leininger was able to score a takedown and gain mount at one point, but he was otherwise soundly beaten as Mezger battled his way to a decision victory. Mezger broke his hand during this fight but continued in the tournament.

The championship round Mezger faced future UFC Light Heavyweight Champion Tito Ortiz. Ortiz was able to counter Mezger's takedown attempt and landed several knees to Mezger's head. To some it appeared that Mezger had tapped, but referee John McCarthy ruled Mezger was blocking the knees and his hand went down as Ortiz shifted his weight. The bout was then stopped to check Mezger's cut. The announcers, as well as Ortiz, thought that the bout was over, but the fight was instead restarted on the feet. Ortiz shot in for a takedown, but Mezger secured a guillotine choke, forcing Ortiz to submit. With this win, Mezger became the UFC 13 lightweight tournament champion.

Mezger then forfeited his King of Pancrase title to fight in the UFC again. Mezger's final bout in the UFC was a rematch with Tito Ortiz at UFC 19: Young Guns. Mezger was sick before the fight but fought anyway, a decision that he regretted after the fight. This resulted in Ortiz handling Mezger and won the bout at the 9:55 mark by referee stoppage. The stoppage was somewhat controversial because both Mezger and his cornerman Ken Shamrock felt that Ortiz's strikes were not doing enough damage to warrant a stoppage. Ortiz then donned a shirt that was insulting to Mezger which provoked an immediate reaction from Ken Shamrock, Mezger's trainer. Mezger would occasionally seek a rematch with Ortiz over the next few years. In 2004 he was finally granted a chance to face Tito Ortiz at UFC 50. Unfortunately, the week of the fight, Mezger was taken to the hospital due to stroke like symptoms, and was taken off the fight card.

=== PRIDE Fighting championships ===
The former UFC champion made his Pride FC debut in 1999 at Pride 6 against the popular Akira Shoji. The two fighters passed most of the first round in the clinch, where Mezger landed strikes and tried unsuccessfully to take down Shoji. At the second, Akira scored a takedown and performed ground and pound, which Mezger retaliated by controlling the striking again when they returned to their feet; however, the Japanese took Mezger's back on the ground towards the end of the round and scored punches while Guy attempted to escape. At the third and final round, the two traded strikes again and Shoji repeated his back siege before the fight ended. The judges decreed a split decision and it was given to Shoji.

Pride officials then signed Mezger to fight Kazushi Sakuraba, who at the time was considered to be one of the best pound for pound fighters in the world. The fight took place at the Pride Grand Prix 2000 Opening Round. Mezger took the fight on two weeks notice and had a broken foot going into the fight. The contract that Mezger signed stipulated that the fight would be one 15-minute round with no overtime, in contrast to the other fights which were to have an extra round in the case of a draw. The fight mostly consisted of Mezger controlling the fight by stopping Sakuraba's takedown attempts while landing strikes from the outside. The round ended and Mezger expected the fight to go to the judges, but Pride officials wanted the fight to go to overtime. This resulted in one of the largest and most publicized controversies in MMA history.

According to Mezger, Pride did not like the outcome of the fight and changed the agreement/contract on the spot in order to give Sakuraba another chance to win the fight. An argument ensued and Mezger was ordered out of the ring and back to the locker room by his corner man, Ken Shamrock, who was livid at the decision to extend the fight because of Mezger's foot injury and the fact that he took the fight on short notice. Later that night, the president of Pride FC made a public apology to Mezger at the Tokyo Dome for the miscommunication. Mezger added, "Royce's father came up to me after my fight and said, "You got screwed. You won that fight." Here's Helio Gracie walking up to me and telling me I got ripped off."

Mezger next competed against Masaaki Satake, winning the fight by unanimous decision.

Mezger made his return to the ring at Pride 10 - Return of the Warriors, facing Brazilian superstar and future middleweight kingpin Wanderlei Silva. Mezger gained the upper hand early, cutting Silva with several crisp combinations and outpointing Silva on the feet. However, he was ultimately knocked out at the 3:45 mark. Shortly before the knockout, Silva was catching the worse end of the punching exchanges and proceeded to throw an intentional, illegal headbutt to Mezger that eventually led to landing the knockout combination. Many people felt as though this was a cheap shot that affected the end result. Some people, including Kazushi Sakuraba, felt the bout should have been changed to a no contest. Mezger talked about his feelings on the matter in an interview: "I am not going to cry foul, it is the fight game and things like that happen, get used to it. It is no win situation when it comes to answering that question, if I said it did (affect the result) then I would be making excuses. I would just like a rematch."

Mezger found a measure of redemption when he defeated Alexander Otsuka by TKO at Pride 12 - Cold Fury. Otsuka challenged Mezger to another fight, but was soundly beaten by TKO for a second time. Mezger returned again at Pride 13 - Collision Course to face Egan Inoue. Mezger walked away with a knockout win over Inoue.

Mezger then met UFC Hall of Famer Chuck Liddell at Pride 14 - Clash of the Titans. Liddell was coming off of a stunning KO over former UFC Heavyweight Champion, Kevin Randleman. Mezger gained control of the first round, knocking Liddell to the mat with a strike and landing a left kick to Liddell's face a few minutes before the bell sounded ending the first round. The second round would be short-lived as Liddell came out strong, knocking Mezger out.

Mezger faced two time ADCC champion Ricardo Arona at Pride 16. Mezger entered the ring with an American flag draped across his shoulders out of respect for the World Trade Center attacks in New York. He also wore trunks with an American flag design. Arona and Mezger circled each other for a few moments, before moving in and exchanging strikes. Mezger ended the round one with two takedowns and side mount position but couldn't capitalize on it. The second round was much of the same until Mezger landed a stunning kick to Arona's face. The third round took a different turn with three minutes left in the round, Arona scored his only takedown of the fight. The third round continued like this, with Arona laying on Mezger, using his ground and pound style for the last three minutes of the bout. Although Mezger controlled the first two rounds (1st round being 10 minutes and the second and third rounds were 5 minutes each), the judges awarded a controversial split decision victory to Arona, causing many to feel that Mezger was robbed of the win.

In December 2001, Mezger was proposed the idea of fighting at Inoki Bom-Ba-Ye while wearing Tiger Mask's attire and mask, but he didn't accept. Thus, Mezger returned to competition at Pride 22 after a year long lay-off, easily winning a decision over Norihisa Yamamoto. Mezger then battled Antônio Rogério Nogueira at Pride 24. Mezger had several good striking exchanges and showcased his submission and takedown defense, but again lost the fight by a controversial split decision.

== Retirement ==
On January 25, 2005, Guy Mezger retired from professional fighting after experiencing stroke-like symptoms prior to his scheduled bout with Tito Ortiz. Mezger trains students in boxing, kickboxing and the Lion's Den Mixed Martial Arts system at his gym, Guy Mezger's Combat Sports Club, in Dallas. He also has a consulting company, CS Consulting, that works with both Federal and State law enforcement agencies on re-vamping their defensive tactics training. Mezger is a part owner in a movie/TV production company that is making "reality TV" shows and action and documentary movies. In 2011, he finished up his studies in holistic medicine (receiving his PhD in Holistic Health) and formed a partnership with a doctor's group called Optimal Health Specialists.

Mezger was the President of Mark Cuban's HDNet Fights and was responsible for developing new talent and securing promotion partners for HDnet's Friday Night Fights. He has also commentated for Chuck Norris' full contact, team-based martial arts competition, the World Combat League, and for Japanese MMA organization DREAM.

== Personal life ==
Mezger and his wife Michelle have two children, Logan and Rachel. He also has a son named Jake from a previous relationship.

In December 2011, Mezger was involved in an altercation in Dallas in front of a sporting goods store where a man was physically abusing a woman. He stepped in to assist the woman by fighting the man, who attacked Mezger with a knife. The attacker was on parole and afterwards needed medical attention for multiple facial bone and arm bone fractures. Mezger's hand was cut in the fight. It was surgically repaired and he was expected to fully recover.

== Championship and accomplishments ==
=== Mixed martial arts ===
- Pancrase Hybrid Wrestling
  - King of Pancrase Openweight Championship (3 Times)
  - 1996 Pancrase Ranking Tournament Champion
- Ultimate Fighting Championship
  - UFC 13 Lightweight Tournament Winner
  - UFC Encyclopedia Awards
    - Fight of the Night (One time) vs. Tito Ortiz 1
    - Submission of the Night (One time) vs. Tito Ortiz 1

=== Karate ===
World Full Contact

- 1993 & 1994 World Full-Contact Karate Champion

=== Kickboxing ===
World Kickboxing Council

- 1995 WKC World Kickboxing Champion
- Other
  - 1996 WFFF World Freestyle Fighting Champion (Junior-Heavyweight)

== Mixed martial arts record ==
Professional record breakdown
46 matches	30 wins	14 losses
By knockout	11	5
By submission	6	3
By decision	13	5
By disqualification	0	1
Draws	2	

Res.	Record	Opponent	Method	Event	Date	Round	Time	Location	Notes
Win	30–14–2	Daniel Bergman	TKO (punches)	European Vale Tudo 1 – Genesis	December 6, 2003	2	1:46	Copenhagen, Denmark	
Loss	29–14–2	Antônio Rogério Nogueira	Decision (split)	Pride 24 – Cold Fury 3	December 23, 2002	3	5:00	Fukuoka, Japan	
Win	29–13–2	Yoshihisa Yamamoto	Decision (unanimous)	Pride 22 – Beasts From The East 2	September 29, 2002	3	5:00	Nagoya, Japan	
Loss	28–13–2	Ricardo Arona	Decision (split)	Pride 16 – Beasts From The East	September 24, 2001	3	5:00	Osaka, Japan	
Loss	28–12–2	Chuck Liddell	KO (punch)	Pride 14 - Clash of the Titans	May 27, 2001	2	0:21	Yokohama, Japan	
Win	28–11–2	Egan Inoue	KO (knee and punch)	Pride 13 - Collision Course	March 25, 2001	1	2:25	Saitama, Japan	
Win	27–11–2	Alexander Otsuka	TKO (doctor stoppage)	KOTC 7 - Wet and Wild	February 24, 2001	2	1:57	San Jacinto, California, United States	
Win	26–11–2	Alexander Otsuka	TKO (punches)	Pride 12 - Cold Fury	December 23, 2000	1	1:52	Saitama, Japan	
Win	25–11–2	Sam Adkins	Submission	Freestyle Fighting Championship	November 18, 2000	1	2:11	Dallas, Texas, United States	
Loss	24–11–2	Wanderlei Silva	KO (punches)	Pride 10 - Return of the Warriors	August 27, 2000	1	3:45	Tokyo, Japan	
Win	24–10–2	Masaaki Satake	Decision (unanimous)	Pride Grand Prix 2000 Finals	May 1, 2000	1	15:00	Tokyo, Japan	
Win	23–10–2	Brad Jones	TKO (punches)	Pure Action 2	March 3, 2000	2	1:35	Kings Point, New York, United States	
Loss	22–10–2	Kazushi Sakuraba	TKO (retirement)	Pride Grand Prix 2000 Opening Round	January 30, 2000	1	15:00	Tokyo, Japan	
Loss	22–9–2	Akira Shoji	Decision (split)	Pride 6	July 4, 1999	3	5:00	Yokohama, Japan	
Loss	22–8–2	Tito Ortiz	TKO (punches)	UFC 19	March 5, 1999	1	9:56	Bay St. Louis, Mississippi, United States	
Win	22–7–2	Yuki Kondo	Decision (majority)	Pancrase - Advance 12	December 19, 1998	1	20:00	Chiba, Japan	Defended the Pancrase Openweight Championship.
Win	21–7–2	Ryushi Yanagisawa	Decision (lost points)	Pancrase - 1998 Anniversary Show	September 14, 1998	1	30:00	Tokyo, Japan	Defended the Pancrase Openweight Championship.
Loss	20–7–2	Semmy Schilt	TKO (palm strikes)	Pancrase - Advance 8	June 21, 1998	1	13:15	Kobe, Japan	
Win	20–6–2	Masakatsu Funaki	Decision (unanimous)	Pancrase - Advance 5	April 26, 1998	1	30:00	Yokohama, Japan	Won the Pancrase Openweight Championship.
Win	19–6–2	Ryushi Yanagisawa	Decision (unanimous)	Pancrase - Advance 4	March 18, 1998	1	20:00	Tokyo, Japan	
Win	18–6–2	Johnny Magilonico	Submission (guillotine choke)	World Pankration Championships 2	January 16, 1998	1	N/A	Dallas, Texas, United States	
Win	17–6–2	Satoshi Hasegawa	Technical submission (straight armbar)	Pancrase: Alive 11	December 20, 1997	1	2:52	Yokohama, Japan	
Win	16–6–2	Kiuma Kunioku	KO (head kick)	Pancrase: Alive 9	October 29, 1997	1	11:12	Tokyo, Japan	
Win	15–6–2	Paul Lazenby	Submission (arm-triangle choke)	World Pankration Championships 1	October 26, 1997	1	N/A	Texas, United States	
Loss	14–6–2	Masakatsu Funaki	Submission (triangle armbar)	Pancrase: 1997 Anniversary Show	September 6, 1997	1	3:58	Chiba, Japan	
Win	14–5–2	Keiichiro Yamamiya	Decision (lost points)	Pancrase: Alive 7	June 30, 1997	1	15:00	Fukuoka, Japan	
Win	13–5–2	Tito Ortiz	Submission (guillotine choke)	UFC 13	May 30, 1997	1	3:00	Augusta, Georgia, United States	Won the UFC 13 Lightweight Tournament.
Win	12–5–2	Christophe Leininger	Decision (unanimous)	UFC 13	May 30, 1997	1	15:00	Augusta, Georgia, United States	UFC 13 Lightweight Tournament Semifinals.
Loss	11–5–2	Yuki Kondo	Decision (lost points)	Pancrase: Alive 2	February 22, 1997	1	20:00	Chiba, Japan	
Win	11–4–2	Semmy Schilt	Decision (lost points)	Pancrase: Alive 1	January 17, 1997	1	20:00	Tokyo, Japan	
Win	10–4–2	Yuki Kondo	Decision (lost points)	Pancrase - Truth 10	December 15, 1996	1	20:00	Tokyo, Japan	
Loss	9–4–2	Kiuma Kunioku	Decision (split)	Pancrase - Truth 7	October 8, 1996	1	10:00	Nagoya, Japan	
Win	9–3–2	Ryushi Yanagisawa	Decision (unanimous)	Pancrase - 1996 Anniversary Show	September 7, 1996	1	20:00	Chiba, Japan	
Draw	8–3–2	Osami Shibuya	Draw (majority)	Pancrase - Truth 6	June 25, 1996	1	10:00	Fukuoka, Japan	
Win	8–3–1	Minoru Suzuki	KO (slam)	Pancrase - Truth 5	May 16, 1996	1	7:59	Tokyo, Japan	
Win	7–3–1	Ryushi Yanagisawa	KO (head kick)	Pancrase - Truth 4	April 8, 1996	1	12:21	Tokyo, Japan	1996 Pancrase Ranking Tournament Finals
Win	6–3–1	Manabu Yamada	TKO (doctor stoppage)	Pancrase - Truth 3	April 7, 1996	1	6:14	Tokyo, Japan	1996 Pancrase Ranking Tournament Semifinals
Win	5–3–1	Takaku Fuke	Decision (unanimous)	Pancrase - Truth 3	April 7, 1996	1	10:00	Tokyo, Japan	1996 Pancrase Ranking Tournament First Round
Loss	4–3–1	Bas Rutten	Submission (ankle lock)	Pancrase - Truth 2	March 2, 1996	1	19:36	Kobe, Japan	
Win	4–2–1	Gregory Smit	Decision (lost points)	Pancrase - Truth 1	January 28, 1996	1	10:00	Yokohama, Japan	
Loss	3–2–1	Minoru Suzuki	DQ (groin kick)	Pancrase - Eyes Of Beast 7	December 14, 1995	1	7:15	Sapporo, Japan	
Draw	3–1–1	Ryushi Yanagisawa	Draw (unanimous)	Pancrase - Eyes Of Beast 6	November 4, 1995	1	10:00	Yokohama, Japan	
Loss	3–1	Masakatsu Funaki	Submission (achilles lock)	Pancrase - 1995 Anniversary Show	September 1, 1995	1	6:46	Tokyo, Japan	
Win	3–0	John Renfroe	Submission (straight armbar)	Pancrase - 1995 Neo-Blood Tournament Second Round	July 23, 1995	1	7:25	Tokyo, Japan	
Win	2–0	John Dowdy	TKO (punches)	UFC 5	April 7, 1995	1	2:02	Charlotte, North Carolina, United States	UFC 5 Tournament Alternate Bout
Win	1–0	Jason Fairn	TKO (corner stoppage)	UFC 4	December 16, 1994	1	2:13	Tulsa, Oklahoma, United States	UFC 4 Tournament Alternate Bout

Preceded by Jerry Bohlander	UFC 13 Lightweight Tournament winner May 30, 1997	Succeeded by Pat Miletich
