= Tom Erikson =

American professional wrestler, mixed martial artist and kickboxer (born 1964)

- Born: July 6, 1964 (age 62); Chicago Heights, Illinois, U.S.
- Other names: The Big Cat
- Nationality: (United States) American
- Height: 1.93 m (6 ft 4 in)
- Weight: 125 kg (276 lb; 19.7 st)
- Division: Super Heavyweight
- Style: Wrestling, Kickboxing
- Stance: Orthodox
- Team: RAW; Team Go-Riki
- Wrestling: NCAA Division I Wrestler
- Years active: 1996–2008

Kickboxing record
- Total: 5
- Wins: 1
- By knockout: 1
- Losses: 4
- By knockout: 4

Mixed martial arts record
- Total: 14
- Wins: 9
- By knockout: 5
- By submission: 3
- Losses: 4
- By knockout: 2
- By submission: 2
- Draws: 1

Other information
- Occupation: Wrestling coach
- University: Triton College; Oklahoma State University–Stillwater

Tom Erikson (born July 6, 1964) is an American former amateur wrestler and mixed martial artist who competed in the super heavyweight division. Weighing between 125 kg (276 lb; 19.7 st) and 139.8 kg (308 lb; 22.01 st) throughout his career, "The Big Cat" began wrestling at an early age and was twice National Junior College Athletic Association (NJCAA) Junior Collegiate Champion at Triton College before achieving National Collegiate Athletic Association (NCAA) Division I honors twice at Oklahoma State University–Stillwater. Erikson was the 1997 U.S. National Champion, and a member of the 1997 U.S. Senior Freestyle World Team, placing fourth in the World Championships at 130 kg. He embarked on his career in MMA in 1996 and went on to fight in the Pride Fighting Championships, being a founding member of the prestigious RAW team.

Erikson was a long time assistant wrestling coach at Purdue University, where he has been coaching since 1997. In 2015 Tom accepted the head wrestling coach position at Lyon College in Batesville, Arkansas. In 2020 he stepped down from his position at Lyon College, to become an assistant coach at Duke University.

== Background ==
Erikson was a graduate of Bloom High School in Chicago Heights, Illinois. Wrestling for Triton College, he was a two-time NJCAA National Champion in 1984 and 1985, winning the Outstanding Wrestler Award at the 1985 tournament. He was also a two-time NCAA Division I Collegiate wrestling All-American, in 1986 and 1987, while competing for Oklahoma State University. Erikson made the switch to the emerging sport of mixed martial arts almost ten years later.

== College and International ==
Erikson had a good wrestling career - He was not a state qualifier at Bloom, but grew into a two-time national champion in 1984 and 1985 at Triton Junior College under the late Art Kraft. He then became a two-time All-American at Oklahoma State, placing 4th in 1986, and 3rd in 1987.

After college, Erikson found early success by winning a freestyle gold medal at the 1988 Canada Cup, beating future Greco-Roman Olympic silver medalist Matt Ghaffari 5–4 in the gold medal match.

Erikson was highly successful in freestyle - The only problem was, so was Bruce Baumgartner.

"He was No. 2 in the world, behind Bruce, for a long time," said Olympic coach Greg Strobel. "He beat all the world champions but Bruce. He could have been a gold medal winner."

Erikson was a 3-time Olympic Alternate in 1988, 1992, and 1996, losing all three times to Bruce Baumgartner in the finals to make the Olympic Team. In those three Olympic Games, Baumgartner went on to take silver in the 1988 Seoul Olympics, 1992 Olympic gold in Barcelona, and a bronze medal in the 1996 Olympic Games, held in Atlanta, Ga.

"It's an emotional roller coaster," says the 6-foot-4-inch, 286-pound wrestler. "It's hard for someone to feel sympathy for me. It's like, 'Are you stupid?' But I still have a dream to be the best at it, and I try and keep a sense of humor." But the joke wears thin at times, especially because Mr. Erikson is no slouch himself. He was finally able to capture first place in the 1992 World Cup, the only year Mr. Baumgartner had sat out.

"He'd have been a three-time gold medalist if it wasn't for Bruce," says Mitch Hull, national teams director for USA Wrestling and himself an alternate in the 1984 Games.

Erikson was known as the 'Ultimate Never Give Up Warrior'. After 8 finals losses to Baumgartner, Erikson finally got to raise the long-awaited coveted USA Wrestling 'Stop Sign' over his head, by defeating future 2-time Olympian Kerry McCoy 7–4, to become the 1997 U.S. Open National Champion. After the victory, Erikson fell to his hands and knees overwhelmed with emotion. Many in the USA Wrestling community thought that an award should have been made after Erikson's retirement called the 'Tom Erikson Never Give Up Perseverance Award'.

Erikson finished his career as a 15-time U.S. national medalist - winning 1 gold, 10 silver, and 4 bronze medals in the USA Wrestling national championship era, never placing below third place at any US Open.

Erikson represented Team USA at the World Cup, becoming the 1992 World Cup Champion with a 5-2 signature win over Georgi Kaisimov (RUS). He was also a member of the 1997 U.S. Senior Freestyle World Team, placing fourth in the World Championships at 130 kg.

== Mixed martial arts career ==
In 1996, Erikson was originally scouted by Richard Hamilton to fight in Ultimate Fighting Championship's UFC 10 event, but he was passed over for Mark Coleman. Erikson then joined his friend Rico Chiapparelli, who would go to found the Real American Wrestling team with other successful wrestlers. Tom would debut before the existence of the team, being managed by Chiapparelli personally.

=== Martial Arts Reality Superfighting ===
Erikson debuted on November 22, 1996, at the Martial Arts Reality Superfighting eight-man openweight tournament in Birmingham, Alabama. In the quarter finals, Erikson defeated sambo fighter Aleksander Khramstovskly via KO by elbows and punches, and then submitted Willie Peeters with a neck crank just thirty-one seconds into the semis; he went to meet Murilo Bustamante in the final, in what would be considered a classic match.

Erikson outweighed the Brazilian jiu-jitsu stylist by around 45 kg/100 lb and got the takedown immediately, which Murilo tried to counter with upkicks and a heel hook attempt. Not much happened, however, as while Erikson was effectively shutting off Bustamante's offense, he was unable to pass his guard, and the men had to return to their feet eighteen minutes later. The remainder of the bout saw some striking exchanges and Bustamante attempting to pull guard.

An extra ten minutes overtime was added onto the match after the regulation thirty minutes finished without a winner, and they returned to their respective positions, with Murilo lying on the ground waiting for Tom to grapple and Erikson standing unwilling to enter the grappler's field. However, this time Erikson devised a special strategy: he would dive into Bustamante's guard to score punches before disengaging and standing back up to avoid danger, and then repeat the process over and over. After several minutes of this tactic, Murilo's face was visibly damaged while Erikson was tired yet unscathed. As he still couldn't finish Bustamante, the bout ended in a draw.

In his second outing, Erikson TKO'd Davin Wright in under a minute at the World Fighting Federation in Birmingham, Alabama on February 24, 1997.

=== Vale tudo ===
Following this, Erikson took part in the Brazil Open '97 heavyweight tournament on June 15, 1997, again representing WAR. After beating native fighter Silvio "Pantera Negra" Vieira, Erikson was pitted against Team Hammer House exponent and fellow American wrestler Kevin Randleman in the final. Randleman attempted to push Erikson into the fence, but he was caught with a right hook, and then Erikson unloaded a series of big shots for the knock out. The Hammer House fighter had to be stretchered out, and Erikson gained the approval of the crowd by helping him out.

Erikson made his return to wrestling to compete at the 1997 World Wrestling Championships in Krasnoyarsk, Russia in August 1997, finishing in fourth place in the 130 kg/286 lb freestyle division. He also beat Tsuyoshi Kohsaka in a submission grappling match on October 11, 1997, in which Erikson controlled him positionally for most of the match, besieging his half guard and avoiding a tight inverted leglock attempt to win the decision. Finally, he got another quick TKO of Ed de Kruijf at Vale Tudo Japan 1997 in Chiba, Japan on November 29, 1997, in what would be his last MMA fight for almost two years.

=== Pride Fighting Championships ===
In his Pride Fighting Championships debut, Erikson beat Gary Goodridge by unanimous decision at Pride 8 in Tokyo, Japan on November 21, 1999. At Pride 11 - Battle of the Rising Sun, Erikson faced Heath Herring, getting the takedown early and unloading ground and pound as usual. However, after a stand-up by the referee, Herring rocked Erikson with two kicks as he tried to wrestle again, knocking him to the ground before finishing him with a rear naked choke at 6:17 of round one.

Erikson submitted Matt Skelton, a kickboxer making his first MMA appearance, at Pride 17 in Tokyo on November 3, 2001. After the event Pride FC amended their rules so that the type of choke he used, which involved grabbing Skelton's throat with his hand in what was termed a "front strangle choke", would no longer be allowed. In his last bout before departing the promotion, Erikson secured a first round rear naked choke submission of Tim Catalfo at Pride 19 in Saitama, Japan on February 24, 2002.

Tom Erikson made his return to MMA and Pride on February 20, 2005, at Pride 29 in Saitama, submitting to Fabrício Werdum rear naked choke in round one. This was his last fight in Pride.

=== Last fights ===
Erikson fought for Hero's at Hero's 5 in Tokyo on May 3, 2006, where he was TKO'd with ground-and-pound from Antônio Silva in the first round.

Erikson was knocked out during the first round of his match with Alexandru Lungu at Strike FC 2 in Mamaia, Romania on August 1, 2008.

== Kickboxing career ==
Despite having no kickboxing background to speak of and only showing rudimentary striking ability in his MMA bouts, Erikson was recruited by premier kickboxing organization K-1 later in 2002. Matched with Mike Bernardo at the K-1 Andy Spirits Japan GP 2002 Final on September 22, 2002, Erikson suffered a first-round knockout defeat. He was able to survive into the fourth round with Hiromi Amada at K-1 Beast 2003 on April 6, 2003, but again lost by KO in a slug-fest.

He faced off with boxing champion Shannon Briggs at the K-1 World Grand Prix 2004 in Saitama on March 27, 2004, and, as one might suspect, the wrestler stood no chance and was KO'd little over a minute into the fight. Erikson recorded his first and only win as a professional kickboxer against Jan Nortje at the K-1 World Grand Prix 2004 in Nagoya on June 6, 2004, flooring Nortje three times in fifty-five seconds to win by TKO.

In his last fight before retirement, he rematched Jan Nortje in a kickboxing match at Deep: Glaiator in Okayama, Japan two weeks later and looked to repeat his performance in the first match as he dropped the South African giant early. After Nortje beat the referee's count, Erikson moved in to finish him only to be knocked down by a left hook from Nortje. Erikson in turn beat the count only to be sent to the canvas again soon after, forcing the referee to stop the fight and sending him into retirement on the back of a stoppage defeat.

== Controversy ==
In 2010, Erikson stated in an interview that he believed he was not invited to the Pride Grand Prix tournament because Mark Kerr forced Pride to leave him out in order to avoid fighting him. Kerr denied this claim and replied by saying that Erikson didn't want to be in the tournament in the first place. However, according to fellow Pride veteran Gary Goodridge, both Kerr and Ricco Rodriguez had it put specifically in their contracts with the promotion that they would not fight Erikson.

== Championships and awards ==
=== Amateur wrestling ===
- National Collegiate Athletic Association
  - NCAA Division I All-American out of Oklahoma State University–Stillwater (1986)
  - NCAA Division I All-American out of Oklahoma State University–Stillwater (1987)
- National Junior College Athletic Association
  - NJCAA Junior Collegiate Championship out of Triton College (1984)
  - NJCAA Junior Collegiate Championship out of Triton College (1985)

=== Mixed martial arts ===
- Brazil Open
  - Brazil Open '97 Heavyweight Tournament Championship
- Martial Arts Reality Superfighting
  - MARS Tournament Runner-up

== Kickboxing record ==
Kickboxing record
1 win (1 (T)KO), 4 losses (4 (T)KO's), 0 draws
Date	Result	Opponent	Event	Location	Method	Round	Time	Record
2008-08-16	Loss	(South Africa) Jan Nortje	Deep: Gladiator	Okayama, Japan	KO (left hook)	1	1:05	1–4
2004-06-06	Win	(South Africa) Jan Nortje	K-1 World Grand Prix 2004 in Nagoya	Nagoya, Japan	TKO (punches)	1	0:55	1–3
2004-03-27	Loss	(United States) Shannon Briggs	K-1 World Grand Prix 2004 in Saitama	Saitama, Japan	KO (right cross)	1	1:02	0–3
2003-04-06	Loss	(Japan) Hiromi Amada	K-1 Beast 2003	Yamagata, Japan	KO (right hook)	4	1:14	0–2
2002-09-22	Loss	(South Africa) Mike Bernardo	K-1 Andy Spirits Japan GP 2002 Final	Osaka, Japan	KO (right hook)	1	2:30	0–1
Legend: Win Loss Draw/No contest Notes

== Mixed martial arts record ==
Professional record breakdown
14 matches	9 wins	4 losses
By knockout	5	2
By submission	3	2
By decision	1	0
Draws	1	

Res.	Record	Opponent	Method	Event	Date	Round	Time	Location	Notes
Loss	9–4–1	Alexandru Lungu	KO (punches)	Strike FC 2	August 1, 2008	1	1:21	Mamaia, Romania	
Loss	9–3–1	Antônio Silva	TKO (punches)	Hero's 5	May 3, 2006	1	2:49	Tokyo, Japan	
Loss	9–2–1	Fabrício Werdum	Submission (rear-naked choke)	Pride 29	February 20, 2005	1	5:11	Saitama, Japan	
Win	9–1–1	Tim Catalfo	Submission (rear-naked choke)	Pride 19	February 24, 2002	1	2:35	Saitama, Japan	
Win	8–1–1	Matt Skelton	Submission (front strangle choke)	Pride 17	November 3, 2001	1	1:51	Tokyo, Japan	
Loss	7–1–1	Heath Herring	Submission (rear-naked choke)	Pride 11 - Battle of the Rising Sun	October 31, 2000	1	6:17	Osaka, Japan	
Win	7–0–1	Gary Goodridge	Decision (unanimous)	Pride 8	November 21, 1999	2	10:00	Tokyo, Japan	
Win	6–0–1	Ed de Kruijf	TKO (punches)	Vale Tudo Japan 1997	November 29, 1997	1	0:37	Chiba, Japan	
Win	5–0–1	Kevin Randleman	KO (punch)	Brazil Open '97	June 15, 1997	1	1:11	Brazil	Brazil Open '97 heavyweight tournament final.
Win	4–0–1	Pantera Negra	TKO (punches)	Brazil Open '97	June 15, 1997	1	2:21	Brazil	Brazil Open '97 heavyweight tournament semi-final.
Win	3–0–1	Davin Wright	TKO (corner stoppage)	World Fighting Federation	February 24, 1997	1	0:42	Birmingham, Alabama, United States	
Draw	2–0–1	Murilo Bustamante	Draw	Martial Arts Reality Superfighting	November 22, 1996	1	40:00	Birmingham, Alabama, United States	MARS tournament final.
Win	2–0	Willie Peeters	Submission (neck crank)	Martial Arts Reality Superfighting	November 22, 1996	1	0:31	Birmingham, Alabama, United States	MARS tournament semi-final.
Win	1–0	Aleksander Khramstovskly	TKO (punches)	Martial Arts Reality Superfighting	November 22, 1996	1	8:55	Birmingham, Alabama, United States	MARS tournament quarter-final.

== Submission grappling record ==
Result	Opponent	Method	Event	Date	Round	Time	Notes
Loss	(Finland) Jannie Pietilainen	N/A	ADCC 2009 +99 kg	2001	1	N/A	
Loss	(United States) Jeff Monson	N/A	ADCC 2001 +99 kg	2001	1	N/A	
Win	(Brazil) Roberto Traven	Points	ADCC 2001 +99 kg	2001	2	N/A	
Win	(Japan) Tsuyoshi Kohsaka	Decision	The Contenders	1997	5	5:00	

== Wrestling record ==
Result	Opponent	Method	Event	Date
Loss	(United States) Stephen Neal	Decision	USA wrestling championship	1999
Win	(Russia) Andrei Shumilin	Fall	1996 USA vs Russia Dual	1996
Win	(Russia) Georgi Kaisimov	Decision	1992 World Cup	1992
