= 2002 in Pride FC =

Mixed martial arts events

Information
- First date: February 22, 2002
- Last date: December 23, 2002

Events
- Total events: 10

Fights
- Total fights: 80
- Title fights: 2

Chronology
| 2001 in Pride | 2002 in Pride FC | 2003 in Pride |

The year 2002 was the 6th year in the history of the Pride Fighting Championships, a mixed martial arts promotion based in Japan. 2002 had 10 events beginning with, Pride FC: The Best, Vol. 1.

== Title fights ==
Title fights in 2002
| Weight class | | | | Method | Round | Time | Event | Notes |
|---|---|---|---|---|---|---|---|---|
| Middleweight | Wanderlei Silva (c) | def. | Kiyoshi Tamura | KO (Punch) | 2 | 2:28 | Pride 19: Bad Blood | (Note: For the Pride Fighting Championship World Middleweight Championship.) |
| Middleweight | Wanderlei Silva (c) | def. | Hiromitsu Kanehara | TKO (Corner Stoppage) | 1 | 3:40 | Pride 23: Championship Chaos 2 | (Note: For the Pride Fighting Championship World Middleweight Championship.) |

== Debut Pride FC fighters ==
The following fighters fought their first Pride FC fight in 2002:

- Achmed Labasanov
- Aji Susilo
- Akira Nitagai
- Alistair Overeem
- Anderson Silva
- Andrei Kopylov
- Antônio Rogério Nogueira
- Bazigit Atajev
- Bob Sapp
- Daisuke Nakamura
- Daniel Gracie
- Demetrius Gioulacos
- Eiji Mitsuoka
- Fatih Kocamis
- Fedor Emelianenko
- Gilles Arsene
- Han Ten Yun
- Hidehiko Yoshida
- Hidehisa Matsuda
- Hiromitsu Kanehara
- Hirotaka Yokoi
- Jerrel Venetiaan
- Joe Son
- John Alessio
- Jong Wang Kim
- Jukei Nakajima
- Kazuki Okubo
- Ken Orihashi
- Kenichi Yamamoto
- Kestutis Smirnovas
- Kevin Randleman
- Kiyoshi Tamura
- Kyosuke Sasaki
- Lloyd Van Dams
- Paulo Filho
- Ron Waterman
- Rory Singer
- Scott Bills
- Shinichiro Takamura
- Sokun Koh
- Steve White
- Takahiro Oba
- Takashi Sugiura
- Tatsuya Iwasaki
- Tim Catalfo
- Togo Togo
- Tomohiko Hashimoto
- Xue Do Won
- Yoshinori Kawakami
- Yoshinori Sasaki
- Yuji Hisamatsu
- Yuki Sasaki
- Yukiya Naito
- Yuriy Kochkine
- Yushin Okami
- Yusuke Imamura
- Yutaro Miyamoto

== Events list ==
| # | Event | Japanese name | Date held | Venue | City | Attendance |
|---|---|---|---|---|---|---|
| 30 | Pride 24 - Cold Fury 3 | —N/a | December 23, 2002 | Marine Messe Fukuoka | Fukuoka, Japan | —N/a |
| 29 | Pride 23 - Championship Chaos 2 | —N/a | November 24, 2002 | Tokyo Dome | Tokyo, Japan | 52,228 |
| 28 | Pride FC - The Best, Vol. 3 | —N/a | October 20, 2002 | Differ Ariake Arena | Tokyo, Japan | —N/a |
| 27 | Pride 22 - Beasts from the East 2 | —N/a | September 29, 2002 | Nagoya Rainbow Hall | Nagoya, Japan | —N/a |
| 26 | Pride FC - Shockwave | Dynamite! | August 28, 2002 | Tokyo National Stadium | Tokyo, Japan | 91,107 |
| 25 | Pride FC - The Best, Vol. 2 | —N/a | July 20, 2002 | Differ Ariake Arena | Tokyo, Japan | —N/a |
| 24 | Pride 21 - Demolition | —N/a | June 23, 2002 | Saitama Super Arena | Saitama, Japan | —N/a |
| 23 | Pride 20 - Armed and Ready | —N/a | April 28, 2002 | Yokohama Arena | Yokohama, Japan | 18,926 |
| 22 | Pride 19 - Bad Blood | —N/a | February 24, 2002 | Saitama Super Arena | Saitama, Japan | —N/a |
| 21 | Pride FC - The Best, Vol. 1 | —N/a | February 22, 2002 | Korakuen Hall | Tokyo, Japan | —N/a |

== Pride FC: The Best, Vol. 1 ==
Pride: The Best Vol. 1
- Promotion: Pride Fighting Championships
- Date: February 22, 2002
- Venue: Korakuen Hall
- City: Tokyo

Event chronology
| Pride 18 | Pride: The Best Vol. 1 | Pride 19 |

Pride FC: The Best, Vol. 1 was an event held on February 22, 2002 at the Korakuen Hall in Tokyo, Japan.

=== Results ===
Main Card
| Weight class | | | | Method | Round | Time | Notes |
|---|---|---|---|---|---|---|---|
| | Yusuke Imamura | def. | Joe Son | TKO (Elbow Injury) | 1 | 0:33 |
| | Sokun Koh | def. | Amir Rahnavardi | KO (Punch) | 2 | 1:19 |
| | Takayuki Okada | def. | Soichi Nishida | TKO (Punches) | 1 | 2:00 |
| | Daiju Takase | def. | Johil de Oliveira | Decision (Unanimous) | 3 | 5:00 |
| | Jong Wang Kim | def. | Yoshinori Sasaki | Submission (Guillotine Choke) | 1 | 0:25 |
| | Eiji Mitsuoka | def. | Anthony Macias | Decision (Unanimous) | 3 | 5:00 |

== Pride 19: Bad Blood ==
Pride 19
- Promotion: Pride Fighting Championships
- Date: February 24, 2002
- Venue: Saitama Super Arena
- City: Saitama

Event chronology
| Pride: The Best Vol. 1 | Pride 19 | Pride 20 |

Pride 19: Bad Blood was an event held on February 24, 2002 at the Saitama Super Arena in Saitama, Japan.

=== Results ===
Main Card
| Weight class | | | | Method | Round | Time | Notes |
|---|---|---|---|---|---|---|---|
| Middleweight | Wanderlei Silva (c) | def. | Kiyoshi Tamura | KO (Punch) | 2 | 2:28 | (Note: For The Pride Fighting Championship World Middleweight Championship.) |
| | Antônio Rodrigo Nogueira | def. | Enson Inoue | Technical Submission (Triangle Choke) | 1 | 6:17 |
| | Don Frye | def. | Ken Shamrock | Decision (Split) | 3 | 5:00 |
| | Heath Herring | def. | Igor Vovchanchyn | Decision (Unanimous) | 3 | 5:00 |
| | Carlos Newton | def. | Jose Landi | Submission (Armbar) | 1 | 7:16 |
| | Rodrigo Gracie | def. | Daijiro Matsui | Submission (Guillotine Choke) | 3 | 0:28 |
| | Alex Stiebling | def. | Wallid Ismail | Decision (Unanimous) | 3 | 5:00 |
| | Tom Erikson | def. | Tim Catalfo | Submission (Rear-Naked Choke) | 1 | 2:35 |

== Pride 20: Armed and Ready ==
Pride 20
- Promotion: Pride Fighting Championships
- Date: April 28, 2002
- Venue: Yokohama Arena
- City: Yokohama
- Attendance: 18,926

Event chronology
| Pride 19 | Pride 20 | Pride 21 |

Pride 20: Armed and Ready was an event held on April 28, 2002 at the Yokohama Arena in Yokohama, Japan.

=== Results ===
Main Card
| Weight class | | | | Method | Round | Time | Notes |
|---|---|---|---|---|---|---|---|
| | Wanderlei Silva | vs. | Mirko Cro Cop | Draw | 5 | 3:00 |
| | Sanae Kikuta | def. | Alexander Otsuka | Decision (Unanimous) | 3 | 5:00 |
| | Murilo Rua | def. | Mario Sperry | Decision (Unanimous) | 3 | 5:00 |
| | Ricardo Arona | def. | Dan Henderson | Decision (Split) | 3 | 5:00 |
| | Antônio Rogério Nogueira | def. | Yusuke Imamura | Technical Submission (Guillotine Choke) | 1 | 0:35 |
| | Quinton Jackson | def. | Masaaki Satake | TKO (Slam) | 1 | 7:07 |
| | Bob Sapp | def. | Yoshihisa Yamamoto | TKO (Punches) | 1 | 2:44 |

== Pride 21: Demolition ==
Pride 21
- Promotion: Pride Fighting Championships
- Date: June 23, 2002
- Venue: Saitama Super Arena
- City: Saitama

Event chronology
| Pride 20 | Pride 21 | Pride: The Best Vol. 2 |

Pride 21: Demolition was an event held on June 23, 2002 at the Saitama Super Arena in Saitama, Japan. This event featured the PRIDE debut of MMA all-time greats Fedor Emelianenko and Anderson Silva.

=== Results ===
Main Card
| Weight class | | | | Method | Round | Time | Notes |
|---|---|---|---|---|---|---|---|
| | Don Frye | def. | Yoshihiro Takayama | TKO (Punches) | 1 | 6:10 |
| | Fedor Emelianenko | def. | Semmy Schilt | Decision (Unanimous) | 3 | 5:00 |
| | Daniel Gracie | def. | Takashi Sugiura | Decision (Split) | 3 | 5:00 |
| | Shungo Oyama | def. | Renzo Gracie | Decision (Unanimous) | 3 | 5:00 |
| | Jeremy Horn | def. | Gilbert Yvel | Decision (Unanimous) | 3 | 5:00 |
| | Anderson Silva | def. | Alex Stiebling | TKO (Doctor Stoppage) | 1 | 1:23 |
| | Gary Goodridge | def. | Achmed Labasanov | Decision (Split) | 3 | 5:00 |
| | Bob Sapp | def. | Kiyoshi Tamura | TKO (Punches) | 1 | 0:11 |

== Pride FC: The Best, Vol. 2 ==
Pride: The Best, Vol. 2
- Promotion: Pride Fighting Championships
- Date: July 20, 2002
- Venue: Differ Ariake Arena
- City: Tokyo

Event chronology
| Pride 21 | Pride: The Best, Vol. 2 | Pride Shockwave |

Pride FC: The Best, Vol. 2 was an event held on July 20, 2002 at the Differ Ariake Arena in Tokyo, Japan.

=== Results ===
Main Card
| Weight class | | | | Method | Round | Time | Notes |
|---|---|---|---|---|---|---|---|
| | Sokun Koh | def. | Bob Schrijber | Decision (Split) | 2 | 5:00 |
| | Antônio Schembri | def. | Daiju Takase | Decision (Split) | 2 | 5:00 |
| | Alistair Overeem | def. | Yusuke Imamura | TKO (Knee and Punches) | 1 | 0:44 |
| | Takayuki Okada | def. | Tomohiko Hashimoto | KO (Punch) | 1 | 2:10 |
| | John Alessio | def. | Eiji Mitsuoka | TKO (Cut) | 2 | 3:13 |
| | Fatih Kocamis | def. | Takahiro Oba | Decision (Unanimous) | 2 | 5:00 |
| | Daisuke Nakamura | def. | Shannon Ritch | Submission (Armbar) | 1 | 4:28 |
| | Jukei Nakajima | def. | Joe Son | TKO (Shoulder Injury) | 1 | 0:54 |
| | Yushin Okami | def. | Hidehisa Matsuda | KO (Punches) | 1 | 3:52 |
| | Yukiya Naito | def. | Ken Orihashi | Decision (Split) | 1 | 5:00 |

== Pride FC: Shockwave ==
Pride Shockwave
- Promotion: Pride Fighting Championships, K-1
- Date: August 28, 2002
- Venue: Tokyo National Stadium
- City: Tokyo
- Attendance: 91,107

Event chronology
| Pride : The Best, Vol. 2 | Pride Shockwave | Pride 22 |

Pride FC: Shockwave was an event held on August 28, 2002 at the Tokyo National Stadium in Tokyo, Japan. The event was co-promoted by the PRIDE Fighting Championships and K-1

=== Results ===
Main Card
| Weight class | | | | Method | Round | Time | Notes |
|---|---|---|---|---|---|---|---|
| | Mirko Cro Cop | def. | Kazushi Sakuraba | TKO (Eye Injury) | 2 | 5:00 |
| | Antônio Rodrigo Nogueira | def. | Bob Sapp | Submission (Armbar) | 2 | 4:03 |
| | Gary Goodridge | def. | Lloyd Van Dams | TKO (Punches) | 1 | 3:39 |
| | Jerrel Venetiaan | def. | Daijiro Matsui | Decision (Split) | 3 | 5:00 |
| | Wanderlei Silva | def. | Tatsuya Iwasaki | TKO (Head Kick and Punches) | 1 | 1:16 |

== Pride 22: Beasts from the East 2 ==
Pride 22
- Promotion: Pride Fighting Championships
- Date: September 29, 2002
- Venue: Nagoya Rainbow Hall
- City: Nagoya

Event chronology
| Pride Shockwave | Pride 22 | Pride: The Best, Vol. 3 |

Pride 22: Beasts from the East 2 was an event held on September 29, 2002 at the Nagoya Rainbow Hall in Nagoya, Japan. It featured the Pride debut of former UFC Heavyweight Champion Kevin Randleman

=== Results ===
Main Card
| Weight class | | | | Method | Round | Time | Notes |
|---|---|---|---|---|---|---|---|
| | Ryan Gracie | def. | Shungo Oyama | Technical Submission (Armbar) | 1 | 1:37 |
| | Quinton Jackson | def. | Igor Vovchanchyn | TKO (Injury) | 1 | 7:17 |
| | Mario Sperry | def. | Andrei Kopylov | TKO (Cut) | 1 | 6:02 |
| | Heath Herring | def. | Yuriy Kochkine | TKO (Knees) | 1 | 7:31 |
| | Paulo Filho | def. | Akira Shoji | Submission (Armbar) | 1 | 2:48 |
| | Anderson Silva | def. | Alexander Otsuka | Decision (Unanimous) | 3 | 5:00 |
| | Guy Mezger | def. | Yoshihisa Yamamoto | Decision (Unanimous) | 3 | 5:00 |
| | Kevin Randleman | def. | Michiyoshi Ohara | Decision (Unanimous) | 3 | 5:00 |

== Pride FC: The Best, Vol. 3 ==
Pride: The Best, Vol. 3
- Promotion: Pride Fighting Championships
- Date: October 20, 2002
- Venue: Differ Ariake Arena
- City: Tokyo

Event chronology
| Pride 22 | Pride: The Best, Vol. 3 | Pride 23 |

Pride FC: The Best, Vol. 3 was an event held on October 20, 2002 at the Differ Ariake Arena in Tokyo, Japan.

=== Results ===
Main Card
| Weight class | | | | Method | Round | Time | Notes |
|---|---|---|---|---|---|---|---|
| | Daijiro Matsui | def. | Rory Singer | Decision (Unanimous) | 2 | 5:00 |
| | Yuji Hisamatsu | def. | Demetrius Gioulacos | Decision (Unanimous) | 2 | 5:00 |
| | Eiji Mitsuoka | def. | Scott Bills | Decision (Unanimous) | 2 | 5:00 |
| | Yushin Okami | def. | Steve White | TKO (Submission to Punches) | 2 | 3:25 |
| | Kestutis Smirnovas | def. | Takahiro Oba | Submission (Armbar) | 1 | 0:55 |
| | Yusuke Imamura | def. | Han Ten Yun | Submission (Guillotine Choke) | 1 | 2:15 |
| | Aji Susilo | def. | Xue Do Won | Submission (Rear-Naked Choke) | 2 | 0:42 |
| | Takayuki Okada | def. | Jong Wang Kim | TKO (Broken Hand) | 1 | 0:24 |
| | Kyosuke Sasaki | def. | Akira Nitagai | Submission (Armbar) | 1 | 4:35 |
| | Yutaro Miyamoto | def. | Yoshinori Kawakami | Decision (Unanimous) | 1 | 5:00 |
| | Shinichiro Takamura | def. | Togo Togo | KO (Punches) | 1 | 4:59 |

== Pride 23: Championship Chaos 2 ==
Pride 23
- Promotion: Pride Fighting Championships
- Date: November 24, 2002
- Venue: Tokyo Dome
- City: Tokyo, Japan
- Attendance: 52,228

Event chronology
| Pride: The Best, Vol. 3 | Pride 23 | Pride 24 |

Pride 23: Championship Chaos 2 was an event held on November 24, 2002 at the Tokyo Dome in Tokyo, Japan.

=== Results ===
Main Card
| Weight class | | | | Method | Round | Time | Notes |
|---|---|---|---|---|---|---|---|
| | Kazushi Sakuraba | def. | Gilles Arsene | Submission (Armbar) | 3 | 2:08 |
| | Kiyoshi Tamura | def. | Nobuhiko Takada | KO (Punch) | 2 | 1:00 |
| | Hidehiko Yoshida | def. | Don Frye | Technical Submission (Armbar) | 1 | 5:32 |
| Middleweight | Wanderlei Silva (c) | def. | Hiromitsu Kanehara | TKO (Corner Stoppage) | 1 | 3:40 | (Note: For The Pride Fighting Championship World Middleweight Championship.) |
| | Antônio Rodrigo Nogueira | def. | Semmy Schilt | Submission (Triangle Choke) | 1 | 6:36 |
| | Fedor Emelianenko | def. | Heath Herring | TKO (Doctor Stoppage) | 1 | 10:00 |
| | Ricardo Arona | def. | Murilo Rua | Decision (Unanimous) | 3 | 5:00 |
| | Kevin Randleman | def. | Kenichi Yamamoto | TKO (Knees) | 3 | 1:16 |
| | Hirotaka Yokoi | def. | Jerrel Venetiaan | Submission (Armbar) | 2 | 3:29 |

== Pride 24: Cold Fury 3 ==
Pride 24
- Promotion: Pride Fighting Championships
- Date: December 23, 2002
- Venue: Marine Messe Fukuoka
- City: Fukuoka

Event chronology
| Pride 23 | Pride 24 | Pride 25 |

Pride 24: Cold Fury 3 was an event held on December 23, 2002 at the Marine Messe Fukuoka in Fukuoka, Japan.

=== Results ===
Main Card
| Weight class | | | | Method | Round | Time | Notes |
|---|---|---|---|---|---|---|---|
| | Antônio Rodrigo Nogueira | def. | Dan Henderson | Submission (Armbar) | 3 | 1:49 |
| | Kevin Randleman | def. | Murilo Rua | TKO (Cut) | 3 | 0:20 |
| | Alistair Overeem | def. | Bazigit Atajev | TKO (Knee to the Body) | 2 | 4:59 |
| | Yoshihisa Yamamoto | def. | Alexander Otsuka | TKO (Leg Injury) | 2 | 5:00 |
| | Rodrigo Gracie | def. | Yuki Sasaki | Decision (Unanimous) | 3 | 5:00 |
| | Ron Waterman | def. | Valentijn Overeem | Submission (Keylock) | 1 | 2:18 |
| | Antônio Rogério Nogueira | def. | Guy Mezger | Decision (Split) | 3 | 5:00 |
| | Daijiro Matsui | def. | Kazuki Okubo | Decision (Unanimous) | 3 | 5:00 |

== See also ==
- Pride Fighting Championships
- List of Pride Fighting Championships champions
- List of Pride Fighting events
