= Tim Catalfo =

American professional wrestle and MMA fighter (born 1959)

- Born: Timothy Lance Catalfo; February 23, 1959 (age 67)
- Other names: Obake
- Nationality: American
- Height: 5 ft 11 in (1.80 m)
- Weight: 231 lb (105 kg; 16.5 st)
- Division: Super Heavyweight; Heavyweight
- Style: MMA; Wrestling
- Fighting out of: Atlanta, Georgia, United States
- Team: Team Obake
- Years active: 1997–2003

Mixed martial arts record
- Total: 6
- Wins: 4
- By submission: 3
- By disqualification: 1
- Losses: 2
- By submission: 2

Other information
- Mixed martial arts record from Sherdog
- Last updated on: November 7, 2010

Timothy Lance Catalfo (born February 23, 1959) is an American former amateur wrestler, and mixed martial artist. A professional MMA competitor from 1997 until 2003, he competed for the PRIDE Fighting Championships and King of the Cage. He was voted as having the seventh-best facial hair in MMA history by hunglodojo.com

== Early life ==
Raised in Montvale, New Jersey, Catalfo attended Pascack Hills High School, where he was New Jersey state wrestling champion in 1977 in the 148-pound weight class.

== Career ==
Catalfo comes from a wrestling background; he finished in fourth place at the 1980 All-American Freestyle tournament and in 1st place at the Greco-Roman Games in 1987. After this, he became a professional wrestler with the World Championship Wrestling (WCW) organization. His nickname, "Obake", was given to him by Japanese pro wrestler Yuji Nagata, and is a Japanese folklore creature. Catalfo also used this name to found the "Obake Gym" one of MMA's first independent schools.

In September 1997, he debuted as a mixed martial artist and defeated his opponent Joe Pardo with a neck crank. He then went to Brazil to fight in the International Vale Tudo Championship where he won his bout via disqualification as his opponent Alexandre Ferreira eye gouged him. He returned to the cage three years later to face UFC veteran Dave Beneteau at King of the Cage 9: Showtime. Catalfo defeated Beneteau with a choke after just 25 seconds of the first round.

The PRIDE Fighting Championships of Japan then gave him the opportunity to fight there. He made his promotional debut in February 2002 against fellow wrestler Tom Erikson at PRIDE 19: Bad Blood. Erikson outweighed Catolfo by around 50 pounds and submitted him with relative ease at 2:25 of the first round. He had one more fight after this, submitting James Daniels at an event in Florida a year later.

== Personal life ==
Catalfo is a licensed chiropractor.

== Mixed martial arts record ==
Professional record breakdown
5 matches	3 wins	2 losses
By knockout	0	0
By submission	3	2
By decision	0	0
Draws	0	

Res.	Record	Opponent	Method	Event	Date	Round	Time	Location	Notes
Win	4–2	James Daniels	Submission (neck crank)	World Extreme Fighting Championships 2: Crunch Time	February 8, 2003	1	1:19	Jacksonville, Florida, United States	
Loss	3–2	Tom Erikson	Submission (rear naked choke)	PRIDE 19	February 24, 2002	1	2:25	Saitama, Japan	Super Heavyweight bout.
Loss	3–1	Bobby Hoffman	Submission (strikes)	KOTC 11: Domination	September 29, 2001	1	3:56	San Jacinto, California, United States	
Win	3–0	Dave Beneteau	Submission (choke)	KOTC 9: Showtime	June 23, 2001	1	0:25	San Jacinto, California, United States	
Win	2–0	Alexandre Ferreira	DQ (eye gouging)	International Vale Tudo Championship 4: The Battle	February 7, 1998	1	9:19	Brazil	
Win	1–0	Joe Pardo	Submission (neck crank)	International Sport Combat Federation: Submission Fighting Open 1	September 6, 1997	N/A	N/A	Griffin, Georgia, United States	
