= UFC 19 =

UFC mixed martial arts event in 1999

UFC 19: Ultimate Young Guns
- The poster for UFC 19: Ultimate Young Guns
- Promotion: Ultimate Fighting Championship
- Date: March 5, 1999
- Venue: Casino Magic Bay St. Louis
- City: Bay St. Louis, Mississippi

Event chronology
UFC 18: The Road To The Heavyweight Title	UFC 19: Ultimate Young Guns	UFC 20: Battle for the Gold

UFC 19: Ultimate Young Guns was a mixed martial arts event held by the Ultimate Fighting Championship on March 5, 1999 at the Casino Magic in Bay St. Louis, Mississippi. The event was seen live on pay-per-view in the United States, and later released on home video.

== History ==
UFC 19 featured the first appearance of collegiate wrestler Kevin Randleman, as well as the first televised appearance of former UFC Light Heavyweight Champion and Hall of Famer Chuck Liddell, who had fought at UFC 17 in an untelevised alternate bout. Future referee Dan Miragliotta made his UFC debut as a judge for the event.

In the main event, Guy Mezger fought Tito Ortiz. Ortiz won the fight via TKO. The bout was a rematch of their first fight in the finals of UFC 13, which Mezger won via guillotine choke submission. Ortiz was a late replacement for Vitor Belfort, who was scheduled to face Mezger but was forced to withdraw. The post-fight disrespect shown by Ortiz to Mezger and the Lion's Den led to the long-running rivalry between Ortiz and Lion's Den leader Ken Shamrock.

UFC 19 was part three of what the UFC called "The Road To The Heavyweight Title", a four-part tournament of sorts, held to determine the Heavyweight Champion after the title was vacated by Randy Couture. It was determined that the winner of Kevin Randleman vs. Maurice Smith would face Bas Rutten at UFC 20 for the Undisputed UFC Heavyweight Championship Title.

== Results ==
Main Card
Weight class				Method	Round	Time	Notes
Middleweight	Tito Ortiz	def.	Guy Mezger	TKO (punches)		9:56
Heavyweight	Gary Goodridge	def.	Andre Roberts	TKO (submission to punches)		0:43
Middleweight	Jeremy Horn	def.	Chuck Liddell	Technical Submission (inverted arm-triangle choke)		12:00
Heavyweight	Kevin Randleman	def.	Maurice Smith	Decision (unanimous)		15:00
Middleweight	Evan Tanner	def.	Valeri Ignatov	TKO (punches and elbows)		2:58
Heavyweight	Pete Williams	def.	Jason Godsey	Submission (kneebar)		1:46
Middleweight	Sione Latu	def.	Joey Roberts	TKO (doctor stoppage)		10:01

== Encyclopedia awards ==
The following fighters were honored in the October 2011 book titled UFC Encyclopedia.

- Fight of the Night: Jeremy Horn vs. Chuck Liddell
- Knockout of the Night: Tito Ortiz
- Submission of the Night: Jeremy Horn

== See also ==
- Ultimate Fighting Championship
- List of UFC champions
- List of UFC events
- 1999 in UFC
