= Giant Ochiai =

Japanese professional wrestler

Giant Ochiai ジャイアント落合

Personal information
- Born: Takayuki Okada; May 8, 1973 Oga, Akita, Japan
- Died: August 8, 2003 (aged 30) Shinagawa, Tokyo, Japan
- Cause of death: Acute subdural hematoma

Professional wrestling career
- Ring name: Giant Ochiai
- Billed height: 1.86 m (6 ft 1 in)
- Billed weight: 130 kg (290 lb; 20 st)
- Trained by: New Japan Dojo; Kenzo Suzuki
- Debut: 2000

Takayuki Okada (岡田 貴幸, Okada Takayuki; May 8, 1973 – August 8, 2003), more widely known as Giant Ochiai (ジャイアント落合, Jaianto Ochiai), was a Japanese professional wrestler and mixed martial artist. Okada's MMA record was 3-3-2 (win–loss–draw).

== Career ==
As a student, Okada won the All Japan Industrial High School Judo League Championship four times. After graduating from college, he trained at the Seidokaikan Tokyo Bom-Ba-Ye dojo with Naoyuki Taira. He also joined the amateur division of Shooto, placing second in its All Japan Amateur Shooto Championship in 1998 and 1999.

In 2000, after Seidokaikan mainstay Masaaki Satake tried his luck in Pride Fighting Championships, Okada followed him in order to do his own debut. He gained the ring name of "Giant Ochiai", sporting shades and a large afro wig over his actual afro hair during his entrances, which drew popularity among fans. The origin of the name would be found in his large height and weight and his uncle, NPB announcer Hiromitsu Ochiai.

Ochiai trained with former Shooto founder Satoru Sayama and got to participate in his Ultimate Boxing event, a month later he debuted in Pride, fighting Ricco Rodriguez in a losing effort. His performance, however, was remarkable, defending multiple submission attempts and only being taken down for a failed judo throw, until he was submitted by smother choke. He continued fighting for Pride, defeating karate stylist Soichi Nishida and professional wrestler Tomohiko Hashimoto, as well as Pancrase exponent Kim Jong Wang. He would also fight in King of the Cage.

Also in 2000, Ochiai debuted in professional wrestling, working sporadically in the stiff style Battlarts organizations. He joined Riki Choshu's World Japan promotion for proper training.

== Death ==
After an August 2003 training accident while training with Kenzo Suzuki at World Japan's dojo, Okada suffered an acute subdural hematoma and entered a coma from which he never recovered. Okada died on August 8, 2003. Okada's August 14 wake was attended by Masaaki Satake, Nobuhiko Takada, Kazushi Sakuraba, and World Japan Management Director Katsuji Nagashima. A moment of silence was held in Pride Grand Prix 2003 in his honor.

== Mixed martial arts record ==
Professional record breakdown
8 matches	3 wins	3 losses
By knockout	2	1
By submission	1	1
By decision	0	1
Draws	2	

Res.	Record	Opponent	Method	Event	Date	Round	Time	Location	Notes
Draw	3–3–2	Memo Diaz	Draw	Deep - 9th Impact	May 5, 2003	2	5:00	Tokyo, Japan	
Win	3–3–1	Kim Jong Wang	Submission (broken hand)	Pride FC: The Best, Vol. 3	October 20, 2002	1	0:24	Tokyo, Japan	
Win	2–3–1	Tomohiko Hashimoto	KO (strikes)	Pride The Best Vol.2	July 20, 2002	1	2:10	Tokyo, Japan	
Win	1–3–1	Soichi Nishida	TKO (punches)	Pride The Best Vol.1	February 22, 2002	1	2:00	Tokyo, Japan	
Loss	0–3–1	Zane Frazier	Decision (unanimous)	KOTC 10 - Critical Mass	August 4, 2001	1	7:00	San Jacinto, California, USA	
Draw	0–2–1	Yoshinori Nishi	Draw	S - Samurai 2000	October 22, 2000	N/A		Tokyo, Japan	
Loss	0–2	Ricco Rodriguez	Submission (smother choke)	Pride 10 - Return of the Warriors	August 27, 2000	1	6:04	Saitama, Japan	
Loss	0–1	Igor Borisov	TKO (punches)	Ultimate Boxing - Pride vs Seikendo	June 11, 2000	1	7:07	Yokohama, Japan	
