= Fatih Kocamis =

Turkish martial artist

- Born: October 21, 1978; Turkey
- Other names: Turkish Terror
- Nationality: German/Turkish
- Height: 1.83 m (6 ft 0 in)
- Weight: 93 kg (205 lb; 14 st 9 lb)
- Division: Light heavyweight
- Style: MMA; Kickboxing
- Fighting out of: Netherlands
- Team: Golden Glory; Team Kocamis, Amrani Palace
- Years active: 1999-2008

Mixed martial arts record
- Total: 17
- Wins: 8
- By knockout: 3
- By submission: 4
- By decision: 1
- Losses: 8
- By knockout: 3
- By submission: 2
- By decision: 3
- Draws: 1

Other information
- Mixed martial arts record from Sherdog

Fatih Kocamis (Turkish: Fatih Kocamış) is a German/Turkish retired mixed martial artist and kickboxer who fought in Pride Fighting Championships, RINGS, K-1 and M-1 Global. He trained with the Golden Glory team, alongside Chalid Arrab, Stefan Leko and Alistair Overeem.

His last fight was in 2005, against the former UFC Heavyweight Champion Kevin Randleman in which he lost by unanimous decision and later retired from fighting in 2008.

== Mixed martial arts record ==
Professional record breakdown
17 matches	8 wins	8 losses
By knockout	3	3
By submission	4	2
By decision	1	3
Draws	1	

Res.	Record	Opponent	Method	Event	Date	Round	Time	Location	Notes
Loss	8-8-1	Kevin Randleman	Decision (unanimous)	Bushido Europe - Rotterdam Rumble	October 9, 2005	2	5:00	Rotterdam, Netherlands	
Win	8-7-1	Yahya Lalanne	Submission (rear-naked choke)	CFC 4 - Cage Carnage	July 3, 2005	1	3:07	Liverpool, England	
Win	7-7-1	Alex Cook	TKO (corner stoppage)	CFC 2 - Cage Carnage	November 14, 2004	2	N/A	Liverpool, England	
Win	6-7-1	Mark Epstein	TKO (punches)	2H2H - 2 Hot 2 Handle	October 10, 2004	N/A	N/A	Rotterdam, Netherlands	
Win	5-7-1	Dave Vader	Submission	It's Showtime - Amsterdam Arena	May 20, 2004	1	0:36	Amsterdam, Netherlands	
Win	4-7-1	Arman Gambaryan	Submission (punches)	M-1 MFC - Russia vs. The World 7	December 5, 2003	1	8:00	St. Petersburg, Russia	
Win	3-7-1	Takahiro Oba	Decision (unanimous)	Pride The Best Vol.2	July 20, 2002	2	5:00	Tokyo, Japan	
Loss	2-7-1	Rodney Glunder	Decision	2H2H 4 - Simply the Best 4	March 17, 2002	2	3:00	Rotterdam, Netherlands	
Draw	2-6-1	Arman Gambaryan	Draw	M-1 MFC - European Championship 2002	February 15, 2002	1	10:00	St. Petersburg, Russia	
Loss	2-6	Islam Dadalov	Submission (headbutt)	IAFC - Pankration World Championship 2001	December 8, 2001	1	0:34	Yaroslavl, Russia	
Loss	2-5	Joop Kasteel	Submission (armbar)	Rings Holland: Some Like It Hard	December 2, 2001	1	1:57	Utrecht City, Netherlands	
Loss	2-4	Moise Rimbon	Decision (1-0 points)	2H2H 3 - Hotter Than Hot	October 7, 2001	2	5:00	Rotterdam, Netherlands	
Win	2-3	Ed de Kruijf	KO (punches)	2H2H 2 - Simply The Best	March 18, 2001	1	7:00	Rotterdam, Netherlands	
Loss	1-3	Valentijn Overeem	KO (punch)	Rings Holland: Di Capo Di Tutti Capi	June 4, 2000	2	0:47	Utrecht City, Netherlands	
Loss	1-2	Romazi Korkelia	TKO (cut)	IAFC - Pankration World Championship 2000 [Day 2]	April 29, 2000	1	N/A	Moscow, Russia	
Loss	1-1	Mikhail Avetisyan	TKO	Seikendo - Hard Battle	November 5, 1999	1	11:26	Yokogama, Japan	
Win	1-0	Niels Bolle	Submission (armbar)	IMA - Back to the Roots	April 24, 1999	N/A	N/A	Hoofddorp, Netherlands	
