= Team Hammer House =

Columbus-based mixed martial arts team

- Founded by: Mark Coleman
- Primary trainers: Mark Coleman
- Past titleholders: Mark Coleman won UFC 10 tournament (1996); won UFC 11 tournament (1996); heavyweight champion (UFC 1997) 245 lb (111 kg); winner 2000 open-weight Grand Prix (PrideFC); Kevin Randleman heavyweight champion (UFC 1999)
- Prominent fighters: Mark Coleman (UFC); Kevin Randleman (Strikeforce); Phil Baroni (UFC); Wes Sims (UFC)
- Training facilities: (United States) Columbus, Ohio
- Website: Team Hammer House

Team Hammer House is a mixed martial arts team operating out of Columbus, Ohio, made up of mostly former NCAA wrestlers. While Hammer House focuses on amateur wrestling they do have cross training deals with notable fighters and camps such as Matt Serra, Pat Miletich and Xtreme Couture Mixed Martial Arts. Founded by former UFC champion Mark Coleman, Team Hammer House has attracted such mixed martial arts fighters as Kevin Randleman and Phil Baroni.

== History ==
=== UFC dominance ===
Coleman made his professional MMA debut at UFC 10. With his solid wrestling background and physical power he won six fights in a row. He beat fighters including Don Frye, Gary Goodridge and Dan Severn, en route to winning the UFC 10 and UFC 11 tournaments and the first ever UFC Heavyweight title.

Randleman's MMA career began with a call from Coleman to invite him to fight in Brazil where he went on to achieve a record of 7 wins and 2 losses. Randleman moved on to the UFC, where he also won the Heavyweight title.

Coleman subsequently experienced a downturn in his career as his predominantly wrestling based style became less effective, with losses to fighters with more developed striking skills and cardio, including Maurice Smith, Pete Williams and Pedro Rizzo.

=== Coleman and Randleman move to PRIDE ===
After the loss to Rizzo, Coleman moved to the Japanese PRIDE organization where he experienced a great deal of initial success, winning the PRIDE Grand Prix 2000 Finals. Randleman also joined PRIDE, debuting against Michiyoshi Ohara and becoming a top contender for the Middleweight title before losing to Quinton Jackson. The main Randleman's victory in PRIDE FC was his stunning and brutal KO victory over Mirko Filipović. Both Coleman and Randleman have since experienced downturns in their careers, with losses to fighters such as Fedor Emelianenko and Mirko Cro Cop (Randleman lost to Mirko in rematch).

Before his bout with Jutaro Nakao at UFC 36: Worlds Collide, Sean Sherk began training at Team Hammer House. Sherk went on to win against Nakao and Benji Radach at UFC 39: The Warriors Return before facing Matt Hughes for the UFC Welterweight Championship at UFC 42: Sudden Impact. Although the fight was close, Sherk lost via unanimous decision.

One of Coleman's opponents at UFC 10: The Tournament, Gary Goodridge, become a part of Team Hammer House to work on his ground skills before his bout with Antônio Rodrigo Nogueira at PRIDE 15. Goodridge remains a member of Team Hammer House although he also trains at American Kickboxing Academy for his kickboxing fights.

Accomplished wrestler, male model and UFC star Phil Baroni started training with Team Hammer House, primarily fighting on PRIDE's Bushido events with success, defeating fighters such as Ikuhisa Minowa, Yuki Kondo and Ryo Chonan.

Wes Sims met Coleman before his fight with Ricardo Morais, and has fought in the UFC and International Fight League.

== Rivalry with Chute Boxe ==
Hammer House was involved in a short melee with Chute Boxe which started at PRIDE 31 after a confrontation erupted between Chute Boxe members Wanderlei Silva and Murilo Rua, and Team Hammer House members Mark Coleman and Phil Baroni. The conflict began after Coleman pushed aside the referee who tried to restrain him from continuing his attack on an injured Mauricio "Shogun" Rua. Coleman's outburst could have been due to members of Chute Boxe entering the ring. Despite this, Silva and other Chute Boxe members attacked Coleman in the ring, Baroni took Silva to the ground and Wanderlei had to be restrained with a foot placed on his head. Following the event, Coleman approached Chute Boxe to apologize, but the Chute Boxe fighters turned him away.

== PRIDE 32 The Real Deal ==
Team Hammer House was heavily represented at Pride FC's first American show, PRIDE 32 in Las Vegas on October 21, 2006, being involved in three of the eight fights including the main event. Hammer House member Kevin Randleman faced a now-healthy Mauricio "Shogun" Rua. Rua won via kneebar submission at 2:35 of the very first round. Phil Baroni defeated Japanese professional boxer turned MMA fighter Yosuke Nishijima via technical submission (kimura) at 3:20 of the first round. Mark Coleman was given the opportunity to fight Pride's undefeated Heavyweight champion Fedor Emelianenko for a second time. In a finish very similar to their first encounter, Fedor was able to apply an armbar from the bottom, forcing Coleman to tap out 1:15 of the second round.

== Members ==
- Mark Coleman, UFC 10 and 11 Heavyweight tournament winner, former UFC Heavyweight champion/PRIDE Grand Prix 2000 tournament winner
- Phil Baroni
- Kevin Randleman
- Branden Lee Hinkle
- Wes Sims
- Royce Alger
