= Ricardo Arona =

Brazilian martial artist (born 1978)

- Born: 17 July 1978 (age 48); Niterói, Brazil
- Other names: The Brazilian Tiger
- Height: 5 ft 10 in (1.78 m)
- Weight: 198 lb (90 kg; 14 st 2 lb)
- Division: Light Heavyweight (205 lb)
- Reach: 73 in (185 cm)
- Style: Brazilian Jiu-Jitsu
- Fighting out of: Rio de Janeiro, Brazil
- Team: Brazilian Top Team
- Rank: 4th deg. BJJ black belt (Note: under Ricardo Libório)
- Years active: 2000–2009 (MMA)

Mixed martial arts record
- Total: 19
- Wins: 14
- By knockout: 3
- By submission: 2
- By decision: 9
- Losses: 5
- By knockout: 3
- By decision: 2

Other information
- Mixed martial arts record from Sherdog

Ricardo Arona (Portuguese pronunciation: [ʁiˈkaʁdu aˈʁõnɐ]; born 17 July 1978) is a Brazilian former professional mixed martial artist, submission grappler and 4th degree Brazilian jiu-jitsu (BJJ) black belt practitioner.

A two-time World IBJJF Jiu-Jitsu champion in the lower belts, Arona is a World black belt medallist and a triple-crown winner of the ADCC Submission Fighting World Championship (winning his weight class, the absolute division, and the superfight).

A professional MMA fighter from 2000 until 2009, Arona competed in PRIDE Fighting Championships, RINGS and was a member of Brazilian Top Team. He is the former RINGS Middleweight Champion, as well as the 2001 RINGS Middleweight Championship Tournament Winner, and 2005 PRIDE Middleweight Grand Prix Runner-Up.

Arona has notable wins in both MMA and submission grappling competition over Tito Ortiz, Jeff Monson, Renato Sobral, Vitor Belfort, Mark Kerr, Kazushi Sakuraba, Wanderlei Silva, Dan Henderson, Alistair Overeem, Murilo Rua, Jeremy Horn, Guy Mezger, and Dean Lister. His four ADCC titles and his clean record of 13–0 after not losing a single point in a match, earned Arona in 2021 a place in the inaugural class of the ADCC Hall of Fame,

== Background ==
Arona was born on 17 July 1978 in Niteroi, Brazil. He trained in Judo and Karate before transitioning into Brazilian Jiu-Jitsu and Capoeira after seeing a Vale Tudo fight at the age of 13. Arona came to Carlson Gracie at the age of 18 when he was a purple belt and would go on to win numerous titles in BJJ and Submission Wrestling.

Arona is the only ADCC competitor to go undefeated without losing a single point in any match.

== Mixed martial arts career ==
=== Fighting Network RINGS ===
Soon after ADCC, Arona joined Fighting Network RINGS, a Japanese mixed martial arts promotion. His debut match would against aging Sambo champion Andrei Kopylov, who Arona defeated by unanimous decision after controlling him positionally for most of the match. He then beat Jeremy Horn by split decision, and went to participate in the King of Kings tournament, but was eliminated at the first round by Fedor Emelianenko in Arona's first loss. Although the Brazilian controlled Emelianenko with takedowns and superior ground game, as RINGS's ruleset gave more scoring to aggression than positional control, Fedor was awarded the decision for attempting more submissions during the match. However, Emelianenko's stablemaster Volk Han, who later parted ways with him, claimed in 2018 that the judges were going to give the victory to Arona before Han convinced RINGS chairman Akira Maeda to give it to Emelianenko instead.

Arona's next opponent was Catch Wrestling expert Hiromitsu Kanehara. The Brazilian overwhelmed him with punches and takedowns, while Kanehara repeatedly reversed to top position and kept attacking, but Arona shockingly submitted him in the second round with a Kneebar. Afterwards, Arona took part in a tournament for the RINGS Middleweight Championship, facing Jeremy Horn again in the first round and beating him by unanimous decision. The final match was against Gustavo Machado, who Arona defeated with kicks and punches in 1:29 to win the tournament and the title.

=== PRIDE Fighting Championships ===
After being noticed in RINGS, Arona was offered a contract to join PRIDE Fighting Championships. He started his career there strong, defeating Pancrase veteran Guy Mezger, but his victory would be a controversial one. Mezger managed to stop Arona's takedowns and landed strikes, including a glancing head kick and several punches through the guard, which forced Arona to defend; it took two rounds for the Brazilian to come back, taking down Mezger and executing ground and pound until the end of the third round. Arona won a split decision, which was disputed by some sources, including the announcers of the match.

Ricardo's next fight would be against another high ranked opponent, Dan Henderson. This time Arona was able to take down the wrestling champion, but Henderson executed his own takedown and landed knees and punches to the face until Arona could escape. The Brazilian switched his strategy and knocked down Henderson with a right hand, though the American still reversed and ended the first round attacking Arona's guard. At the second round, despite receiving a cut over his eye, Arona managed to overpower Henderson and punish him from the top. He looked to have secured a rear-naked choke, only for Henderson to escape, but Arona controlled him to end the match and got the split decision.

At PRIDE 23, Arona would go against Murilo Rua, a member of the Chute Boxe team, which was in a rivalry with Brazilian Top Team at the time. The two contenders fought a series of battles on the clinch, in which Arona imposed his superior wrestling, and almost finished the fight with a rear-naked choke and an Achilles lock at the end of the first round. The match went back and forth, with Murilo escaping from sparse submissions and landing his famed strikes, but Arona overpowered him with takedowns and kicks at the end and won the unanimous decision.

The victory over Rua was followed by Arona's first defeat in PRIDE, losing his fourth fight to Quinton Jackson in a spectacular knockout. Arona, outsized for the first time in the promotion, saw Jackson powering out of his holds, so he elected to stay in his guard to minimize damage. He seemed to knock out Jackson with an upkick, but as it wasn't so, he followed with a triangle choke, only for Jackson to suddenly lift him up and counter it with a powerbomb. The slam knocked Arona out and led the referee to stop the match, declaring Jackson the winner. After the bout, Arona protested and claimed that an illegal headbutt he received by Jackson at the end of the slam was what knocked him out but it was never officially acknowledged or investigated.

Four months later, Arona returned to PRIDE and won a fight against sambo champion Sergey Ignatov. On 23 April 2005, Arona entered PRIDE's Middleweight (205 lbs) Grand Prix. He won his first fight in the tournament against Dean Lister by unanimous decision, controlling the ADCC contender in a slow grappling contest.

In the second round of the Grand Prix, Arona won, in controversial fashion, his fight against the Japanese fighter Kazushi Sakuraba via corner stoppage. Although Sakuraba put Arona on his back and seemed to put to work his signature jumping stomps, Arona soon overwhelmed him, landing a series of brutal knees to the head, as well as hard soccer kicks to the face. The Brazilian's toenail accidentally slashed open the skin over Sakuraba's left eye, which the Brazilian capitalized on squeezing the cut and digging his finger into it in order to force the stoppage. The Japanese tried to keep on, but Arona hit another flurry of knees to the head, and ended the fight landing soccer kick after soccer kick. He was declared the winner when Sakuraba's corner called a stop to the fight at the conclusion of the second round due to the amount of damage he had sustained.

His semifinal match, against rival Wanderlei Silva, was held on 28 August 2005. Arona surprised everyone when he defeated Silva, who was the PRIDE Middleweight Champion at the time, by decision, handing Silva his first middle weight defeat in PRIDE. Despite Silva's feared striking, Arona put him down with an early leg kick and worked on an extensive ground and pound, taking him down every time the fight got standing in order to continue with the punishment, which lasted until the last minute. After defeating Silva, Arona advanced to finals where he faced rising MMA fighter Maurício "Shogun" Rua, brother of Murilo Rua and Chute Boxe integrant. In a dominant performance, Rua reversed a takedown from Arona and got the advantage, opening his hips to catch Arona in an omoplata. Instead of submitting Arona, Rua used the advantage to get top position, then after a missed stomp, knocked Arona out with hammerfists to the face.

On 31 December 2005 Ricardo Arona fought Wanderlei Silva for a second time, this time for the Middleweight Championship. Arona threatened to execute the same gameplan, but Silva countered it with a strong takedown defense and an opportunistic striking, including standing away from Arona's guard and kicking his legs. Arona got a decisive takedown at the second round and performed ground and pound, only for Silva to reverse and get free, which forced Ricardo to pull guard. At the final round, Arona managed to take Wanderlei to the ground and attack from top position, with Silva reversing him again and kicking at his legs. Arona lost the match in a heavily debated split decision.

On 10 September 2006 Arona faced Alistair Overeem. After withstanding the initial attack from Overeem, Arona landed an inside leg kick, injuring his opponent's leg and making him drop to the ground. Arona quickly overwhelmed Overeem on the ground by blanketing him and showed complete domination throughout the bout. He continued his assault until Overeem tapped out from a barrage of strikes.

Arona suffered from a dengue hemorrhagic fever, going into his fight against Sokoudjou on 8 April 2007 at PRIDE 34. Because of its affects on his body, claims Arona, he was knocked out by Sokoudjou in just under 2 minutes.

=== Post-PRIDE ===
After his loss to Sokoudjou, Arona's comeback fight against UFC veteran Marvin Eastman was canceled due to an injury that Eastman suffered during training. The fight with Eastman was rescheduled and took place at Bitetti Combat MMA 4 on 12 September 2009. Arona won the fight via unanimous decision.

In June 2014, Arona was offered a contract by Bellator MMA. However, he declined the offer and cited wanting to be one hundred percent physically healthy before recommitting to MMA as his reason.

== Championships and accomplishments ==
=== Brazilian jiu-jitsu / Submission wrestling ===
Main Achievements (Black Belt):

- 2nd Place IBJJF World Championship (2000)

Main Achievements (Coloured Belts):

- 2 x CBJJ World Champion (1998 purple, 1999 brown)
- CBJJ Brazilian National Champion (1994 blue / 1999 brown)
- 2nd place CBJJ World Championship (1999 brown (Note: Absolute))

Submission wrestling:

- 2 x ADCC Submission Fighting World Champion (2000 / 2001 (Note: Weight and absolute))
- ADCC Superfight Champion (2003)

=== Mixed martial arts ===
- Fighting Network RINGS
  - RINGS Middleweight Championship (One Time, First, Last)
  - 2001 RINGS Middleweight Championship Tournament Winner
- PRIDE Fighting Championships
  - 2005 PRIDE Middleweight Grand Prix Runner Up
- Sherdog
  - 2005 Upset of the Year vs. Wanderlei Silva on 28 August

== Mixed martial arts record ==
Professional record breakdown
19 matches	14 wins	5 losses
By knockout	3	3
By submission	2	0
By decision	9	2

Res.	Record	Opponent	Method	Event	Date	Round	Time	Location	Notes
Win	14–5	Marvin Eastman	Decision (unanimous)	Bitetti Combat MMA 4	12 September 2009	3	5:00	Rio de Janeiro, Brazil	
Loss	13–5	Rameau Thierry Sokoudjou	KO (punch)	PRIDE 34	8 April 2007	1	1:59	Saitama, Japan	
Win	13–4	Alistair Overeem	TKO (submission to punches)	Pride FC - Final Conflict Absolute	10 September 2006	1	4:28	Saitama, Japan	
Loss	12–4	Wanderlei Silva	Decision (split)	PRIDE Shockwave 2005	31 December 2005	3	5:00	Saitama, Japan	For the Pride Middleweight Championship.
Loss	12–3	Maurício Rua	KO (punches)	PRIDE Final Conflict 2005	28 August 2005	1	2:54	Saitama, Japan	2005 Pride Middleweight Grand Prix Final.
Win	12–2	Wanderlei Silva	Decision (unanimous)	PRIDE Final Conflict 2005	28 August 2005	2	5:00	Saitama, Japan	2005 Pride Middleweight Grand Prix Semifinal.
Win	11–2	Kazushi Sakuraba	TKO (corner stoppage)	PRIDE Critical Countdown 2005	26 June 2005	2	5:00	Saitama, Japan	2005 Pride Middleweight Grand Prix Quarterfinal.
Win	10–2	Dean Lister	Decision (unanimous)	PRIDE Total Elimination 2005	23 April 2005	3	5:00	Osaka, Japan	2005 Pride Middleweight Grand Prix Opening Round.
Win	9–2	Sergey Ignatov	Submission (rear-naked choke)	PRIDE 28	31 October 2004	1	9:05	Saitama, Japan	
Loss	8–2	Quinton Jackson	KO (slam)	PRIDE Critical Countdown 2004	20 June 2004	1	7:32	Saitama, Japan	
Win	8–1	Murilo Rua	Decision (unanimous)	PRIDE 23	24 November 2002	3	5:00	Tokyo, Japan	
Win	7–1	Dan Henderson	Decision (split)	PRIDE 20	28 April 2002	3	5:00	Yokohama, Japan	
Win	6–1	Guy Mezger	Decision (split)	PRIDE 16	24 September 2001	3	5:00	Osaka, Japan	
Win	5–1	Gustavo Machado	TKO (leg kick and punches)	RINGS: 10th Anniversary	11 August 2001	1	1:29	Tokyo, Japan	Won 2001 RINGS Middleweight Championship Tournament. Became inaugural RINGS Middleweight Champion.
Win	4–1	Jeremy Horn	Decision (majority)	RINGS: 10th Anniversary	11 August 2001	2	5:00	Tokyo, Japan	RINGS Middleweight Championship Tournament Semifinals.
Win	3–1	Hiromitsu Kanehara	Submission (kneebar)	RINGS: World Title Series 2	15 June 2001	2	0:53	Yokohama, Japan	
Loss	2–1	Fedor Emelianenko	Decision (unanimous)	RINGS: King of Kings 2000 Block B	22 December 2000	3	5:00	Osaka, Japan	
Win	2–0	Jeremy Horn	Decision (split)	RINGS: Millennium Combine 3	23 August 2000	2	5:00	Osaka, Japan	
Win	1–0	Andrei Kopylov	Decision (unanimous)	RINGS: Millennium Combine 1	20 April 2000	2	5:00	Tokyo, Japan	

== Submission grappling record ==
13 Matches, 13 Wins (1 Submission)
Result	Rec.	Opponent	Method	Event	Division	Date	Location
Win	13–0	(United States) Mark Kerr	Points	ADCC World Championship	Superfight	2003	(Brazil) São Paulo
Win	12–0	(Brazil) Jean Jacques Machado	Points	ADCC World Championship	Absolute	2001	(United Arab Emirates) Abu Dhabi
Win	11–0	(Brazil) Vitor Belfort	Points	ADCC World Championship	Absolute	2001	(United Arab Emirates) Abu Dhabi
Win	10–0	(Brazil) Saulo Ribeiro	Points	ADCC World Championship	Absolute	2001	(United Arab Emirates) Abu Dhabi
Win	9–0	(United States) Roger Neff	Submission (footlock)	ADCC World Championship	Absolute	2001	(United Arab Emirates) Abu Dhabi
Win	8–0	(Brazil) Ricardo Almeida	Points	ADCC World Championship	-99 kg	2001	(United Arab Emirates) Abu Dhabi
Win	7–0	(Norway) Jon Olav Einemo	Points	ADCC World Championship	-99 kg	2001	(United Arab Emirates) Abu Dhabi
Win	6–0	(Brazil) Renato Sobral	Points	ADCC World Championship	-99 kg	2001	(United Arab Emirates) Abu Dhabi
Win	5–0	(Ukraine) Ruslan Mashurenko	Points	ADCC World Championship	-99 kg	2001	(United Arab Emirates) Abu Dhabi
Win	4–0	(United States) Jeff Monson	Points	ADCC World Championship	-99 kg	2000	(United Arab Emirates) Abu Dhabi
Win	3–0	(United States) Tito Ortiz	Points	ADCC World Championship	-99 kg	2000	(United Arab Emirates) Abu Dhabi
Win	2–0	(Russia) Kareem Barkalev	Points	ADCC World Championship	-99 kg	2000	(United Arab Emirates) Abu Dhabi
Win	1–0	(Japan) Hiromitsu Kanehara	Points	ADCC World Championship	-99 kg	2000	(United Arab Emirates) Abu Dhabi

== See also ==
- List of male mixed martial artists
