= Murilo Rua =

Brazilian mixed martial fighter

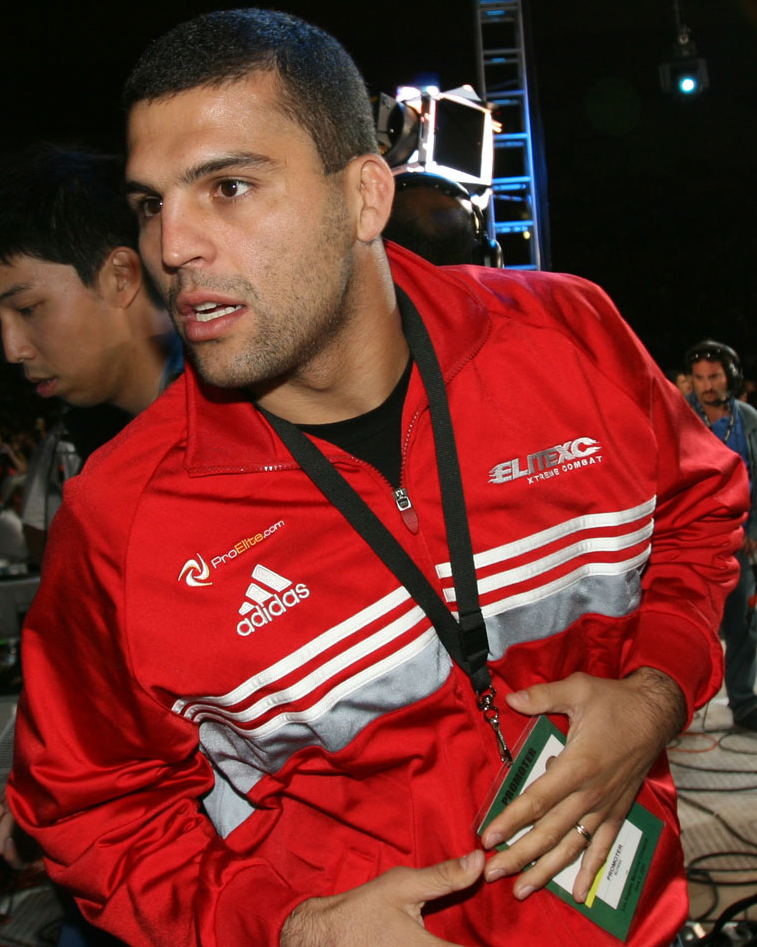
- Born: May 22, 1980 (age 46); Curitiba, Brazil
- Nickname: Ninja
- Height: 5 ft 11 in (1.80 m)
- Weight: 186 lb (84 kg; 13 st 4 lb)
- Division: Middleweight; Light heavyweight Heavyweight
- Reach: 72 in (183 cm)
- Style: MMA, Muay thai, Brazilian jiu-jitsu
- Stance: Southpaw
- Fighting out of: Curitiba, Brazil
- Team: Chute Boxe Academy (until 2008); Universidade da Luta (2008–present)
- Rank: Black belt in Brazilian Jiu-Jitsu; Black prajied in Muay Thai
- Years active: 2000–2012

Mixed martial arts record
- Total: 34
- Wins: 20
- By knockout: 10
- By submission: 8
- By decision: 2
- Losses: 13
- By knockout: 7
- By decision: 6
- Draws: 1

Other information
- Notable relatives: Mauricio Rua (brother)
- Mixed martial arts record from Sherdog
- Last updated on: September 13, 2011

Murilo Milani Rua (Portuguese pronunciation: [ˈʁuɐ]; born May 22, 1980), also known as Ninja, is a Brazilian retired mixed martial artist. He is the older brother of former UFC Light Heavyweight Champion Mauricio Rua. He was the inaugural EliteXC Middleweight Champion and also competed in Pride Fighting Championships.

== Mixed martial arts career ==
Rua started his career at Chute Boxe Academy in Curitiba, Brazil, a Muay Thai training group which has produced champions like Wanderlei Silva. Ninja's first foray into MMA was with Brazilian-based Meca World Vale Tudo, where he amassed an impressive 5–0–1 record before signing with Pride Fighting Championships.

Ninja made his PRIDE debut against Daijiro Matsui in September 2001, which he won via referee stoppage after repeated kicks and stomps. After losing a close decision to Dan Henderson, Rua went on to defeat Alex Andrade, and Alexander Otsuka. Rua was scheduled to fight for the Meca Middleweight (205 lb) title vs Jorge Navalhada, but was injured, and could not fight for the title. After returning from injury, he defeated Mario Sperry, and this fueled beginning of the long lasting rivalry between Chute Boxe and Brazilian Top Team. Rua lost to Ricardo Arona in a close battle of attrition, and Sergei Kharitonov in the Pride Total Elimination 2004, where he fought as a heavyweight, suffering a brutal knockout loss.

At Pride 29, Rua faced Quinton Jackson. Rua lost the fight by split decision which was controversial. Jackson was noticeably confused with the result and attempted to offer the winner's trophy to Rua following the decision. Commentators such as Mauro Ranallo and Bas Rutten, who were present at the bout, also have stated that they thought Rua had won the fight.

Rua fought three more times in Pride, defeating newcomer Murad Chunkaiev before dropping a lacklustre decision against top ranked Paulo Filho. Nevertheless, Rua was selected as part of the Pride welterweight (185 pound) Grand Prix. In the opening bracket, however, he was knocked out by Denis Kang. Rua then left Pride for a tenure with British MMA promotion Cage Rage in order to strengthen the tie between the two promotions. His first bout, against English UFC veteran Mark Weir, resulted in a victory by submission after a rough and tumble affair. He also defeated Alex Reid via doctor stoppage before the newly created EliteXC organization purchased Cage Rage, therefore he fought for the vacant Elite XC middleweight at Strikeforce: Shamrock vs. Baroni against Greg Jackson trained Joey Villasenor and recorded a second-round TKO, stopping Villasenor with strikes. After three months as the champion, his first title defense came to ICON sport middleweight champion Robbie Lawler. Despite narrowly winning the first two rounds, an exhausted Ninja was defeated via a third-round TKO at EliteXC: Uprising. He rebounded with a victory over Muay Thai fighter and Cage Rage contender Xavier Foupa-Pokam at Cage Rage 24: Feel the pain.

On December 18, 2007, Sherdog.com reported that both Rua and his brother Mauricio had left the Chute Boxe camp with plans to open up their own facility in Massachusetts. The Ruas' new camp was named Universidade da luta, which translates to "University of Fighting", and instead was opened in the Ruas' hometown of Curitiba, Brazil.

Rua was initially scheduled to fight Phil Baroni on the May 31, 2008, EliteXC card, however, he suffered a minor foot injury which led him to fight on the June 14 card instead, where he recorded a dominant KO victory over undefeated Tony Bonello. On October 4, 2008, Rua was defeated by Benji Radach on a live CBS broadcast. Radach finished the fight with punches to Rua's head after a failed flying knee sent him sprawling on his back.

Rua made his Dream debut at Dream 8 against Riki Fukuda on April 5, 2009. His original opponent was supposed to be Dong Sik Yoon but Dong was injured and Riki was found as a late replacement. Rua went on to lose against Riki by unanimous decision. After winning both of his latest bouts at Bitetti Combat MMA 4 and Bitetti Combat MMA 5 in the Light heavyweight division, Rua hinted that he will continue fighting at 205 lb.

Rua was supposed to fight Falaniko Vitale at Shine Fights 3 on May 15, 2010. The middleweight bout between Falaniko Vitale and Rua, previously announced for Shine Fights Worlds Collide: Mayorga vs. Thomas, was scrapped due to an injury sustained by Vitale.

Rua was planning to participate in Dream 14, though that event being rescheduled led to other plans.

Rua beat Jeremy May on July 18, 2010, at Impact Fighting Championships by submission via guillotine choke.

Rua lost to Cesar Gracie product Roy Boughton via unanimous decision on October 23, 2010. Boughton missed weight by 5.5 lbs.

"Ninja" fought Tom Watson for the BAMMA Middleweight Title on May 21, 2011. The fight proved to be a one sided affair, with Rua being rocked several times throughout the fight, as well as being visibly hurt with leg kicks. The end came at 2:06 of the third round after Watson stunned Rua with a head kick and followed up with strikes until the referee stepped in to save the unconscious Rua.

After Rua lost against Tom Watson, he said he would not continue fighting and would retire. Rua is now set to come out of retirement to fight a rematch against Pride FC vet and former World Extreme Cage Fighting middleweight champion Paulo Filho.

The two originally met at Pride Bushido 10 where Paulo Filho won by unanimous decision after three rounds.

Rua once again lost to Filho by yet another controversial referee stoppage by Mario Yamasaki. Filho landed a strong combination which rocked Rua, forcing him to shoot for a single leg take down. Yamasaki saw this as a reason to stop the fight, and stepped in to save Rua.

== Personal life ==
Rua and longtime girlfriend Ana married on October 8, 2004, in Curitiba, Brazil. The couple have two sons, born in August 2008 and March 2010.

== Championships and accomplishments ==
=== Mixed martial arts ===
- EliteXC
  - EliteXC Middleweight Championship (One Time, First)

== Mixed martial arts record ==
Professional record breakdown
34 matches	20 wins	13 losses
By knockout	10	7
By submission	8	0
By decision	2	6
Draws	1	

Res.	Record	Opponent	Method	Event	Date	Round	Time	Location	Notes
Loss	20–13–1	Paulo Filho	TKO (punches)	Best of the Best: Filho vs. Ninja II	September 6, 2012	1	0:47	Belém, Brazil	Retired after bout.
Loss	20–12–1	Tom Watson	KO (head kick and punches)	BAMMA 6: Watson vs. Rua	May 21, 2011	3	2:06	London, England	For the BAMMA World Middleweight Championship.
Loss	20–11–1	Roy Boughton	Decision (unanimous)	W-1 New Ground	October 23, 2010	3	5:00	Nova Scotia, Canada	Catchweight bout (190 lb); Boughton missed weight (195.5 lb).
Win	20–10–1	Jeremy May	Submission (guillotine choke)	Impact FC 2	July 18, 2010	1	4:12	Sydney, Australia	Return to Middleweight.
Win	19–10–1	Arturo Arcemendes	Submission (arm-triangle choke)	Bitetti Combat MMA 7	May 28, 2010	1	1:27	Rio de Janeiro, Brazil	
Win	18–10–1	Jason Jones	TKO (punches)	Bitetti Combat MMA 5	December 12, 2009	2	3:20	São Paulo, Brazil	
Win	17–10–1	Alex Stiebling	KO (head kick)	Bitetti Combat MMA 4	September 12, 2009	1	0:39	Rio de Janeiro, Brazil	Light heavyweight debut.
Loss	16–10–1	Riki Fukuda	Decision (unanimous)	Dream 8	April 5, 2009	2	5:00	Nagoya, Japan	
Loss	16–9–1	Benji Radach	KO (punches)	EliteXC: Heat	Oct 4, 2008	2	2:31	Sunrise, Florida, United States	
Win	16–8–1	Tony Bonello	KO (punches)	EliteXC: Return of the King	June 14, 2008	1	3:16	Hawaii, United States	
Win	15–8–1	Xavier Foupa-Pokam	Submission (rear-naked choke)	Cage Rage 24	December 1, 2007	2	3:47	London, England	
Loss	14–8–1	Robbie Lawler	KO (punches)	EliteXC: Uprising	September 15, 2007	3	2:04	Hawaii, United States	Lost Elite XC Middleweight Championship.
Win	14–7–1	Joey Villaseñor	KO (punches)	Strikeforce: Shamrock vs. Baroni	June 22, 2007	2	1:05	California, United States	Won the Inaugural Elite XC Middleweight Championship.
Win	13–7–1	Alex Reid	TKO (cut on the shin)	Cage Rage 21	April 21, 2007	1	0:28	London, England	
Win	12–7–1	Mark Weir	Submission (arm-triangle choke)	Cage Rage 18	September 30, 2006	2	1:15	London, England	
Loss	11–7–1	Denis Kang	KO (punches)	Pride - Bushido 11	June 4, 2006	1	0:15	Saitama, Saitama, Japan	Pride 2006 Welterweight Grand Prix Opening Round.
Loss	11–6–1	Paulo Filho	Decision (unanimous)	Pride - Bushido 10	April 2, 2006	2	5:00	Tokyo, Japan	
Win	11–5–1	Murad Chunkaiev	Submission (heel hook)	Pride 30	October 23, 2005	1	3:31	Saitama, Saitama, Japan	Middleweight debut.
Loss	10–5–1	Quinton Jackson	Decision (split)	Pride 29	February 20, 2005	3	5:00	Saitama, Saitama, Japan	
Loss	10–4–1	Sergei Kharitonov	KO (punches)	Pride Total Elimination 2004	April 25, 2004	1	4:14	Saitama, Saitama, Japan	Pride 2004 Heavyweight Grand Prix Opening Round.
Win	10–3–1	Alexander Otsuka	Submission (side choke)	Pride 27	February 1, 2004	1	5:25	Osaka, Japan	
Win	9–3–1	Akira Shoji	KO (flying knee)	Pride Shockwave 2003	December 31, 2003	1	2:24	Saitama, Saitama, Japan	
Loss	8–3–1	Kevin Randleman	TKO (cut)	Pride 24	December 23, 2002	3	0:20	Tokyo, Japan	
Loss	8–2–1	Ricardo Arona	Decision (unanimous)	Pride 23	November 24, 2002	3	5:00	Tokyo, Japan	
Win	8–1–1	Mario Sperry	Decision (unanimous)	Pride 20	April 28, 2002	3	5:00	Yokohama, Japan	
Win	7–1–1	Alex Andrade	Decision (unanimous)	Pride 18	December 23, 2001	3	5:00	Fukuoka, Fukuoka, Japan	
Loss	6–1–1	Dan Henderson	Decision (split)	Pride 17	November 3, 2001	3	5:00	Tokyo, Japan	
Win	6–0–1	Daijiro Matsui	TKO (soccer kicks and stomps)	Pride 16	September 24, 2001	3	0:51	Osaka, Japan	
Win	5–0–1	Rogerio Sagate	Submission (keylock)	Meca World Vale Tudo 5	June 9, 2001	1	3:54	Curitiba, Brazil	
Draw	4–0–1	Akihiro Gono	Draw (majority)	Shooto - To The Top 4	May 1, 2001	3	5:00	Tokyo, Japan	
Win	4–0	Leopoldo Serao	TKO (cuts)	Meca World Vale Tudo 4	December 16, 2000	1	7:00	Curitiba, Brazil	
Win	3–0	Luiz Claudio das Dores	TKO (submission to leg kicks)	Meca World Vale Tudo 3	November 14, 2000	1	3:00	Curitiba, Brazil	
Win	2–0	Israel Albuquerque	TKO (submission to punches)	Meca World Vale Tudo 2	August 12, 2000	1	1:36	Curitiba, Brazil	
Win	1–0	Adriano Verdelli	Submission (triangle choke)	Meca World Vale Tudo 1	May 27, 2000	1	3:08	Curitiba, Brazil	

New championship	1st Elite XC Middleweight Champion; June 22, 2007 – September 15, 2007	Succeeded by Robbie Lawler
