= UFC 20 =

UFC mixed martial arts event in 1999

UFC 20: Battle for the Gold
- The poster for UFC 20: Battle for the Gold
- Promotion: Ultimate Fighting Championship
- Date: May 7, 1999
- Venue: Boutwell Auditorium
- City: Birmingham, Alabama

Event chronology
UFC 19: Ultimate Young Guns	UFC 20: Battle for the Gold	UFC 21: Return of the Champions

UFC 20: Battle for the Gold was a mixed martial arts event held by the Ultimate Fighting Championship on May 7, 1999 at the Boutwell Auditorium in Birmingham, Alabama. The event was seen live on pay per view in the United States, and later released on home video.

== History ==
UFC 20 was the final event of what the UFC called "The Road to the Heavyweight Title", a tournament of sorts spanning four events, held to determine the Heavyweight Champion after Randy Couture vacated the title (due to contract disputes with the UFC). Bas Rutten defeated Kevin Randleman to become the new Heavyweight Champion in a controversial split decision.

Referees for the event were Mario Yamasaki (first time for UFC pay-per-view) and John McCarthy.

== Results ==
Main Card
Weight class				Method	Round	Time	Notes
Heavyweight	Bas Rutten	def.	Kevin Randleman	Decision (split)		21:00	(Note: For the vacant UFC Heavyweight Championship.)
Heavyweight	Pedro Rizzo	def.	Tra Telligman	KO (punch)		4:30
Heavyweight	Pete Williams	def.	Travis Fulton	Submission (armlock)		6:28
Middleweight	Wanderlei Silva	def.	Tony Petarra	KO (knee)		2:53
Lightweight	Marcelo Mello	def.	Dave Roberts	TKO (punches)		1:23
Lightweight	LaVerne Clark	def.	Fabiano Iha	TKO (doctor stoppage)		1:31
Preliminary Card
Heavyweight	Ron Waterman	def.	Chris Condo	TKO (punches)		0:28

== Encyclopedia awards ==
The following fighters were honored in the October 2011 book titled UFC Encyclopedia.

- Fight of the Night: Pedro Rizzo vs. Tra Telligman
- Knockout of the Night: Wanderlei Silva
- Submission of the Night: Pete Williams

== See also ==
- Ultimate Fighting Championship
- List of UFC champions
- List of UFC events
- 1999 in UFC
