= Kevin Randleman =

American mixed martial artist (1971–2016)

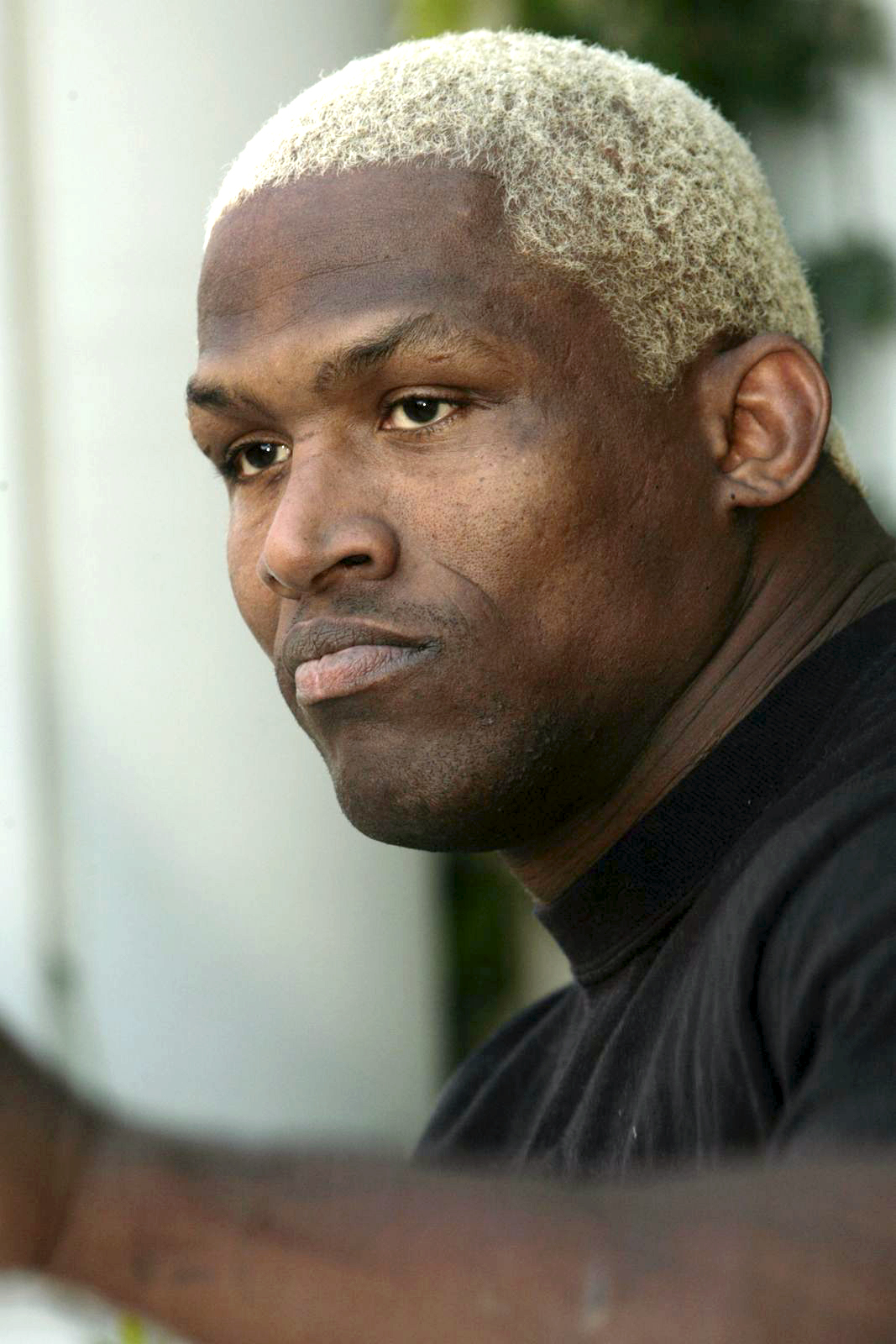
- Randleman in 2006
- Born: Kevin Christopher Randleman; August 10, 1971; Sandusky, Ohio, U.S.
- Died: February 11, 2016 (aged 44); San Diego, California, U.S.
- Other names: The Monster
- Nationality: American
- Height: 5 ft 10 in (1.78 m)
- Weight: 205 lb (93 kg; 14 st 9 lb)
- Division: Light Heavyweight (2001–2003, 2005–2011); Heavyweight (1996–2001, 2004–2005)
- Reach: 70 in (178 cm)
- Style: Wrestling
- Fighting out of: Columbus, Ohio, U.S.
- Team: Team Hammer House; Xtreme Couture
- Wrestling: NCAA Division I Wrestling Champion
- Years active: 1996–2011 (MMA)

Mixed martial arts record
- Total: 33
- Wins: 17
- By knockout: 9
- By decision: 8
- Losses: 16
- By knockout: 4
- By submission: 8
- By decision: 4

Other information
- University: Ohio State University; Lindenwood University
- Notable school: Sandusky High School
- Mixed martial arts record from Sherdog
Medal record
Men's collegiate wrestling
Representing the Ohio State Buckeyes
NCAA Division I Championships
| Gold medal – first place | 1992 Oklahoma City | 177 lb |
| Gold medal – first place | 1993 Ames | 177 lb |
| Silver medal – second place | 1991 Iowa City | 167 lb |
Big Ten Championships
| Gold medal – first place | 1991 Illinois | 177 lb |
| Gold medal – first place | 1992 Wisconsin | 177 lb |
| Gold medal – first place | 1993 Ohio State | 177 lb |
- Last updated on: September 15, 2011

Kevin Christopher Randleman (August 10, 1971 – February 11, 2016) was an American mixed martial artist, amateur and professional wrestler, and former UFC Heavyweight Champion. Randleman's background was in collegiate wrestling, in which he became a two-time NCAA Division I and a three-time Big Ten wrestling champion out of Ohio State University. Randleman competed in the heavyweight and light heavyweight classes in MMA. In addition to competing in the UFC, Randleman also fought for other organizations such as PRIDE, WVR, and Strikeforce. He was previously associated with Mark Coleman's Team Hammer House, before training at Randy Couture's gym in Las Vegas, Nevada. On May 16, 2020, the UFC announced that Randleman would be inducted into the pioneer wing of the UFC Hall of Fame. Randleman is the first fighter to be posthumously inducted into the UFC Hall of Fame.

== Background ==
Randleman was born in Sandusky, Ohio, and was one of eleven children. He had a humble upbringing and often engaged in street fights during childhood. Randleman attended Sandusky High School, started all four years on the football team, ran track in which he qualified for the state finals, and had a 122–11 record while on the wrestling team, including winning the state championship in 1989. Randleman then went to wrestle for Ohio State University. His redshirt freshman year he had a string of 42 victories and a first-place finish in the Big Ten Tournament, earned All-American status, and dominated in the NCAA tournament, before losing in the tournament final to Mark Reiland of Iowa. Randleman then went undefeated during his sophomore year, and won the NCAA tournament. Randleman again won the NCAA tournament in his junior year, despite having his jaw dislocated during the actual tournament. His final collegiate wrestling record was 108 wins and 7 losses, with 28 pins. Despite having some of the most successful three years in the history of collegiate wrestling, including compiling the third best winning percentage in Ohio State wrestling history, Randleman became ineligible to wrestle in his senior year because of academic issues. After leaving Ohio State, Randleman attended Lindenwood University. However in 2002 Randleman was nominated as the Ohio State University Wrestler of the Century.

Kevin supported the United States Army troops whenever he could. While in Iraq in 2008, Kevin traveled with other UFC fighters to visit the troops at the 4th Infantry Division's Modern Army Combatives tournament at Camp Liberty. He quickly got down on the mats and gave an important ground demonstration. Kevin eagerly posed for pictures and signed autographs for anyone who asked.

== Mixed martial arts career ==
Randleman entered mixed martial arts in 1996 when Mark Coleman, one of Randleman's coaches at Ohio State, offered him a spot in the Universal Vale Tudo Fighting 4 in Brazil. Randleman accepted and joined Coleman in what would be known as Team Hammer House.

=== Universal Vale Tudo Fighting ===
Cornered by Coleman, Randleman made his debut on October 22, 1996 at Universal Vale Tudo Fighting 4 against Luiz Carlos Maciel, stopping him with punches in five minutes. He advanced to the next round to meet Canadian fighter Geza Kalman, who outweighed him by 40 pounds, and defeated him the same way in only 2 minutes more. Randleman reached the finals, where he encountered Dan Severn's trainee Dan Bobish. The latter controlled the first minutes from the clinch, attempting neck cranks and landing several punches, but Randleman skillfully escaped. The two then exchanged hard strikes, with Bobish getting the better of it, but Randleman scored a takedown and mounted him, from where he landed several strikes for the tournament win.

In March 1997, Randleman returned to the promotion for UVF 6, in finding a difficult opponent in the first round in luta livre veteran Ebenezer Fontes Braga. The American controlled the takedowns, but the Brazilian defended solidly with strikes both standing and from his guard every time, with Randleman attempting to sneak in ground and pound through the latter. The bout soon turned controversial, however, as Braga would end up exiting the ring beneath the ropes several times, at some points even being externally helped by his team. Later in the bout, Braga scored several kicks and knees over a gradually fatigued Randleman, but Randleman was still able to control the fight, and later landed a striking combo that sent Braga out of the ring. After 20 minutes of fighting, a unanimous decision was given to Randleman, who acknowledged Braga's effort too.

Randleman's next opponent was acclaimed Brazilian jiu-jitsu fighter Mario "Sukata" Neto. The fight was shorter than the previous, but the situation repeated itself, as Neto dragged the match out by escaping the ring and even hitting him from outside. After managing to finish him with punches, Randleman advanced the finals to meet Carlson Gracie's trainee Carlos "Carlao" Barreto, another famous BJJ fighter. The fight started with a lengthy clinch battle, but Barreto pulled guard and attacked him with upkicks and strikes. The Brazilian remained on the ground, where Randleman attacked with ground and pound, but fatigue eventually caught with him, and Barreto was finally capable to lock a triangle choke for the win. The stoppage was disputed by Coleman, who wound up arguing with Gracie and his team.

The end of Randleman's tenure in Brazil was at Brazil Open-'97 in June 1997. He beat Gustavo Homem de Neve in under two minutes, but he was then pitted against another decorated American wrestler, RAW team member Tom Erikson. Randleman attempted to push the 50 pounds heavier Erikson into the fence, but he was caught with a right hook, and then Erikson unloaded a series of big shots for the knock out. The Hammer House fighter had to be stretchered out with the help of Erikson himself. Randleman claimed he had befriended Erikson before the match and it was difficult for him to fight him.

=== Ultimate Fighting Championship ===
Randleman fought in the UFC heavyweight and light heavyweight divisions at UFC 19, UFC 20, UFC 23, UFC 26, UFC 28, UFC 31, and UFC 35. Beating Maurice Smith to become a top contender at UFC 19, he fought Bas Rutten for the UFC Heavyweight Championship at UFC 20, which was previously vacated by Randy Couture. Randleman lost via a decision to Rutten, even though Randleman maintained positional superiority with takedowns, it was judged that Rutten was the more active fighter with strikes. This fight became infamous due to Mark Coleman's instructions before the second overtime that Randleman "smear the blood" from the cut he had created above Rutten's nose into his eye, so his opponent would not be able to see. This was a very controversial loss at the time, so much that the judges official criteria for how fights are scored and tallied was changed as a consequence.

Randleman achieved his goal to become the UFC Heavyweight Champion on November 19, 1999, beating Pete Williams at UFC 23 for the title which was vacated upon Rutten's retirement.

Before his scheduled fight as the main event at UFC 24, Randleman slipped on some pipes and fell on the concrete floor, which rendered him unconscious. As a result, he was pulled from the card. He was later diagnosed with a concussion. The UFC did not announce that his main event fight was cancelled until right before it was to take place. As a result, there was no main event to this card. His fight, scheduled with Pedro Rizzo, ended up taking place at UFC 26, Randleman won via unanimous decision.

However, he later lost the title to Randy Couture at UFC 28 via TKO. After losing the title, he moved down to light heavyweight, feeling it was a more natural weight for his body, but suffered a setback, losing to Chuck Liddell at UFC 31 in his first fight at light heavyweight before beating Renato "Babalu" Sobral by unanimous decision in his final fight with the UFC.

=== PRIDE FC ===
On September 29, 2002, Randleman made his debut in Pride Fighting Championships, taking on Japanese wrestler Michiyoshi Ohara. Randleman acquired an easy victory, as Ohara appeared to have no intention of trying to fight Randleman right from the outset, and even tried to flee and grab the ropes several times in an attempt to avoid damage from Randleman. This match was panned by the audience and Randleman himself, who left the ring before being awarded his trophy, was visibly angry.

Throughout the course of 2002, Randleman gained victories over Kenichi Yamamoto via TKO after vicious knee strikes from north-south position and Murilo "Ninja" Rua via TKO by cutting Rua with a counter left hook. This winning streak would eventually put him in the spot of contender for the Pride Middeweight Championship, held by Wanderlei Silva. At Pride 25, Randleman faced another Middleweight contender, fellow American wrestler Quinton "Rampage" Jackson, in a match that determined the number one contender for Silva's belt. In the first round Randleman suffered his first loss in PRIDE, after an incredible knee-uppercut combination from Jackson knocked Randleman down. The referee stopped the fight after Rampage got dominant position and began landing strikes on Randleman.

Randleman faced Kazushi Sakuraba for his last match in 2003. Just three months before the fight with Sakuraba, Randleman was involved in a severe car accident in which he seized while driving his SUV. He hit a truck and was almost decapitated, but survived with a horrible head wound that required 180 stitches. However, he took an EKG test and several physical tests by a doctor which determined that he was medically okay to leave, and that there were essentially no issues other than the large skin wound. Randleman lost the fight to Sakuraba via a third-round armbar submission.

Randleman became one of the sixteen participants in the PRIDE 2004 Heavyweight Tournament, alongside teammate Mark Coleman. His first round match up at PRIDE Total Elimination 2004 was against former K-1 kickboxer Mirko Cro Cop, a participant heavily favored to win the entire tournament. Randleman knocked out Cro Cop by ground and pound following a left hook that surprised and knocked him down. In the second round, at PRIDE Critical Countdown 2004, Randleman faced off against the reigning PRIDE Heavyweight Champion Fedor Emelianenko. Again a heavy underdog, in a short bout he managed to suplex Fedor onto his head, landing in north-south position. This maneuver failed to damage Fedor, who quickly capitalized on Randleman's characteristic failure to inflict damage upon opponents from a dominant position by reversing him and submitting him with a kimura, thereby eliminating him from the tournament.

With his tournament journey over, Randleman went on to square off against friend and fellow American wrestler Ron Waterman at PRIDE Final Conflict 2004. Randleman picked up and slammed much bigger Waterman, and was ahead on the scorecards but made one mistake and lost by americana in the first round. At PRIDE Shockwave 2004 Randleman offered a rematch to Mirko Cro Cop. Cro Cop submitted Randleman in the first round via guillotine choke, avenging his loss and adding another loss to Randleman's losing streak in the process. In the Opening Round of PRIDE's 2005 Middleweight Grand Prix, Kevin Randleman lost to Kazuhiro Nakamura via decision. In November 2005, Randleman appeared in Bushido Europe: Rotterdam Rumble, Europe's first Bushido event, and defeated Fatih Kocamis via decision, ending his losing streak, and giving him his first win in nearly a year.

Randleman was taken ill with a serious fungal lung infection after his Rotterdam bout that had unknowingly been present for some time. He underwent a successful surgery to have the infection removed. After recovering, he was scheduled to fight against Vitor Belfort at a Strikeforce event in San Jose, California on June 9, 2006, but was unable to, due to a recurrence of the infection. Belfort instead fought, and lost to, Alistair Overeem, by unanimous decision.

Kevin Randleman returned to PRIDE for their first show on American soil, Pride 32: The Real Deal on October 21, 2006, where he was quickly submitted with a toe hold in the first round by 2005 Middleweight Grand Prix Champion Maurício "Shogun" Rua. This match-up was made partly to capitalize on an incident where Mark Coleman fought Rua and broke his arm with a trip takedown. After the referee stopped the fight, a brawl ensued. Chute Boxe and Hammer House members then entered the ring, clashing verbally and physically, creating bad blood between the two teams.

=== Controversy, illness and suspension from fighting ===
After the bout with Rua, Randleman failed a drug test administered by the Nevada Athletic Commission. Randleman submitted a urine sample lacking any hormones to the Nevada State Athletic Commission. This indicated that the sample was fake. On January 19, 2007, Randleman was hospitalized due to serious damage to his kidneys. In an interview with MMAWeekly, he stated he failed to submit a urine sample due to his use of painkillers and antibiotics after his previous surgeries that may have prevented him from being cleared to fight, and his health issues were a result of the cumulative effects of his surgeries, medication and fighting on his body.

The Nevada Athletic Commission met on February 16, 2007, to discuss the fake sample and revoked Randleman's license to fight. He was able to reapply for a license after October 21, 2007, a year from the date of his loss to Maurício Rua.

In 2007, Randleman was sidelined for more than a year when a staph infection under his arm leaked into his bloodstream. The infection nearly killed him; it left a gaping hole under his arm, shut down his liver and kidney and left him in a coma.

He was quoted as saying "It looked like someone had taken a shotgun and shot me up close," says Randleman. After dismissing his symptoms for five weeks, he was admitted to the hospital in septic condition. Doctors were forced to remove portions of Randleman's lateral and pectoral muscles in an attempt to eradicate the staph bacteria from his body.

In October 2007, he was quoted as saying of the staph infection "I was in critical condition for almost three weeks and I am two weeks out of the hospital now ... pain is just part of the healing, and it hurts a lot.... I had two organs shut down again. I think what I need to do is stop enduring the pain and go see the doctors earlier."

=== World Victory Road: Sengoku ===
After one year and seven months of lay off due to kidney problems, a staph infection and suspension, Randleman came back with a unanimous decision over Ryo Kawamura on May 18, 2008, at Sengoku 2.

Randleman's next fight was scheduled to be on June 21, 2008, against Jeff Monson at the Godz of War; however, Randleman injured his shoulder while training. Ricco Rodriguez replaced him and fought Monson, losing a unanimous decision.

Randleman said that he would fight at Sengoku 6 in November, but did not. Later, he explained that he injured his shoulder very seriously in his comeback fight against Ryo Kawamura, so he took a long rest.

On November 7, 2009, Randleman fought Bulgarian prospect Stanislav Nedkov at Sengoku 11. Randleman started the fight with a good left leg kick and takedown. He used elevators and reversals to avoid damage from Nedkov, when Nedkov made a few takedowns. In the 3rd round Randleman repeated his strong left leg kick and used his new blue belt Brazilian jiu-jitsu skills to avoid bottom positions and back immediately to the top positions on the ground. After three rounds the judges rendered a controversial split decision, with one judge for Randleman and two judges for Nedkov.

=== Strikeforce ===
At the Strikeforce: Shamrock vs. Diaz press conference it was announced that he had finalised the signing of a contract with Strikeforce.

Randleman's Strikeforce debut was on June 6 against journeyman and IFL standout Mike Whitehead at Strikeforce: Lawler vs. Shields. Randleman looked to grapple immediately in the fight, whilst Whitehead controlled the fight on the feet. Whitehead won the first two rounds using takedowns but Randleman employed the use of reversals very competently to avoid significant damage. In the third round Randleman, having seemingly lost the previous rounds, threw caution to the wind and loosened his arms, becoming reckless with his strikes, but knocking his opponent down with a left hook to the chin. Randleman charged in to finish Whitehead and landed a few shots to Whitehead's head, but was unable to capitalize effectively on the knock-down. All three judges scored the bout 29–28 in favor of Whitehead.

Randleman lost to Strikeforce newcomer Roger Gracie via a rear-naked choke submission in the second round of their light heavyweight bout on May 15, 2010, at Strikeforce: Heavy Artillery. He lost 10 out of his last 13 fights. Following the loss to Russian black belt judoka, Baga Agaev with Agaev submitting Randleman with a modified armbar and dislocating his elbow, Randleman had decided to retire.

== Professional wrestling career ==
Kevin Randleman
Personal information
- Born: August 10, 1971
- Died: February 11, 2016 (aged 44) San Diego, California

Professional wrestling career
- Ring name(s): Kevin Randleman; Randleman
- Billed height: 5 ft 10 in (1.78 m)
- Billed weight: 205 lb (93 kg)
- Billed from: Columbus, Ohio
- Debut: November 17, 2002
- Retired: September 13, 2007

=== All Japan Pro Wrestling (2002) ===
Randleman debuted in professional wrestling in 2002 as part of All Japan Pro Wrestling's Wrestle-1 project, which brought several mixed martial artists and kickboxers to take part in wrestling matches. Teaming up with Mark Coleman, Randleman wrestled Hiroshi Hase and Satoshi Kojima in a losing effort. They returned for the next Wrestle-1 event, defeating the masked tag team of Jan the Giant Convict and Singh the Giant Convict.

=== Pro Wrestling Zero1 (2003–2004) ===
In July 2003, Randleman started working for Pro Wrestling Zero-One, teaming up with The Predator to take part in the OH Tag Festival tournament. They performed well, eliminating Yoshiaki Fujiwara and Yuki Ishikawa at the first round and Emblem (Masato Tanaka and Shinjiro Otani) at the second, but they lost in the finals to Naoya Ogawa and Katsuhisa Fujii.

=== Hustle (2004–2007) ===
The next year, Randleman started appearing in Zero-One's partner promotion Hustle. Introduced as a member of heel faction Takada Monster Army and managed by Takada's secretary Ute Werner, Randleman had his first singles match against Wataru Sakata, but he lost despite Werner trying to intervene in his favor. Due to the loss, he was expelled from the Monster Army, so he sought refuge in babyface faction Hustle Army, led by Naoya Ogawa.

After two years of inactivity, Kevin returned to Hustle in June 2007, adopting the masked superhero persona of "Randleman" and teaming up with fellow superheroes Kintaman and Kurodaman. His former partner Mark Coleman also joined the team, making it a quartet. In September 2007, Randleman made his last appearance in Hustle, defeating Kohei Sato and Piranha Monster alongside Coleman.

In February 2009, Randleman made a challenge to WWE pro-wrestler Kofi Kingston on a St. Louis FOX Sports MMA show called Absolute Wrestling Radio!

== Personal life ==
Kevin married Barbara on August 28, 2000. After hardships, they divorced on May 26, 2005. Kevin married his longtime girlfriend and publicist, Elizabeth Broglia, on April 25, 2009. He had four children: Calvin, Jasmine, Madolyn, and Santino.

After his professional fighting career, Randleman founded a non-profit program called Monster Wrestling Academy at Coronado High School in which he taught wrestling to kids alongside other volunteer coaches like Phil Baroni.

== Death ==
Randleman died while traveling for business on February 11, 2016; complications of pneumonia were the cause of death. He was 44 years old.

== Championships and accomplishments ==
=== Mixed martial arts ===
- Ultimate Fighting Championship
  - UFC Hall of Fame (Pioneer Wing, Class of 2020)
  - UFC Heavyweight Championship (One time; former)
    - One successful title defense
  - UFC Road To The Heavyweight Title Tournament Runner-Up (1999)
  - UFC Encyclopedia Awards
    - Fight of the Night (One time) vs. Randy Couture
- Universal Vale Tudo Fighting
  - UVTF 4 Tournament Champion
  - UVTF 6 Tournament Finalist
- Brazil Open
  - Brazil Open '97 Heavyweight Tournament Runner-Up
- Fight Matrix
  - Knockout of the Year (2004) vs. Mirko Cro Cop on April 25
- FIGHT! Magazine
  - Knockout of the Year (2004) vs. Mirko Cro Cop on April 25
- MMA Fighting
  - Most Lopsided Upset of the Year (2004)

=== Collegiate wrestling ===
- National Collegiate Athletic Association
  - NCAA Division I 177 lb – Champion out of Ohio State University (1992, 1993)
  - NCAA Division I 167 lb – Runner-up out of Ohio State University (1991)
  - NCAA Division I All-American out of Ohio State University (1991, 1992, 1993)
  - Ohio State University Wrestler of the Century (20th Century)
- Big Ten Conference
  - Big Ten 177 lb – Champion out of Ohio State University (1991, 1992, 1993)

== Mixed martial arts record ==
Professional record breakdown
| 33 matches | 17 wins | 16 losses |
| By knockout | 9 | 4 |
| By submission | 0 | 8 |
| By decision | 8 | 4 |

| Res. | Record | Opponent | Method | Event | Date | Round | Time | Location | Notes |
|---|---|---|---|---|---|---|---|---|---|
| Loss | 17–16 | Baga Agaev | Submission (armbar) | FEFoMP - Mayor's Cup 2011 | May 7, 2011 | 1 | 4:05 | Khabarovsk, Russia | |
| Loss | 17–15 | Roger Gracie | Submission (rear-naked choke) | Strikeforce: Heavy Artillery | May 15, 2010 | 2 | 4:10 | St. Louis, Missouri, United States | |
| Loss | 17–14 | Stanislav Nedkov | Decision (split) | World Victory Road Presents: Sengoku 11 | November 7, 2009 | 3 | 5:00 | Tokyo, Japan | |
| Loss | 17–13 | Mike Whitehead | Decision (unanimous) | Strikeforce: Lawler vs. Shields | June 6, 2009 | 3 | 5:00 | St. Louis, Missouri, United States | |
| Win | 17–12 | Ryo Kawamura | Decision (unanimous) | World Victory Road Presents: Sengoku 2 | May 18, 2008 | 3 | 5:00 | Tokyo, Japan | |
| Loss | 16–12 | Maurício Rua | Submission (kneebar) | Pride 32 - The Real Deal | October 21, 2006 | 1 | 2:35 | Las Vegas, Nevada, United States | Subsequently suspended following post-fight drug test failure. |
| Win | 16–11 | Fatih Kocamis | Decision (unanimous) | Bushido Europe: Rotterdam Rumble | October 9, 2005 | 2 | 5:00 | Rotterdam, Netherlands | |
| Loss | 15–11 | Kazuhiro Nakamura | Decision (unanimous) | PRIDE Total Elimination 2005 | April 23, 2005 | 3 | 5:00 | Osaka, Japan | Return to Light Heavyweight. PRIDE 2005 Middleweight Grand Prix Opening Round. |
| Loss | 15–10 | Mirko Cro Cop | Submission (guillotine choke) | PRIDE Shockwave 2004 | December 31, 2004 | 1 | 0:42 | Saitama, Japan | |
| Loss | 15–9 | Ron Waterman | Submission (americana) | PRIDE Final Conflict 2004 | August 15, 2004 | 1 | 7:44 | Saitama, Japan | |
| Loss | 15–8 | Fedor Emelianenko | Submission (kimura) | PRIDE Critical Countdown 2004 | June 20, 2004 | 1 | 1:33 | Saitama, Japan | PRIDE 2004 Heavyweight Grand Prix Quarterfinal. |
| Win | 15–7 | Mirko Cro Cop | KO (punches) | PRIDE Total Elimination 2004 | April 25, 2004 | 1 | 1:57 | Saitama, Japan | Return to Heavyweight. PRIDE 2004 Heavyweight GP Opening Round. Knockout of the Year (2004). Upset of the Year (2004). |
| Loss | 14–7 | Kazushi Sakuraba | Submission (armbar) | PRIDE Final Conflict 2003 | November 9, 2003 | 3 | 2:36 | Tokyo, Japan | |
| Loss | 14–6 | Quinton Jackson | KO (knee and punches) | PRIDE 25 | March 16, 2003 | 1 | 6:58 | Yokohama, Japan | PRIDE Middleweight title eliminator. |
| Win | 14–5 | Murilo Rua | TKO (doctor stoppage) | PRIDE 24 | December 23, 2002 | 3 | 0:20 | Fukuoka, Japan | |
| Win | 13–5 | Kenichi Yamamoto | TKO (knees) | PRIDE 23 | November 24, 2002 | 3 | 1:16 | Tokyo, Japan | |
| Win | 12–5 | Michiyoshi Ohara | Decision (unanimous) | PRIDE 22 | September 29, 2002 | 3 | 5:00 | Nagoya, Japan | |
| Win | 11–5 | Brian Foster | KO (punch) | RFC: The Beginning | July 13, 2002 | 1 | 0:20 | Las Vegas, Nevada, United States | |
| Win | 10–5 | Renato Sobral | Decision (unanimous) | UFC 35 | January 11, 2002 | 3 | 5:00 | Uncasville, Connecticut, United States | |
| Loss | 9–5 | Chuck Liddell | KO (punches) | UFC 31 | May 4, 2001 | 1 | 1:18 | Atlantic City, New Jersey, United States | Light Heavyweight debut. |
| Loss | 9–4 | Randy Couture | TKO (punches) | UFC 28 | November 17, 2000 | 3 | 4:13 | Atlantic City, New Jersey, United States | Lost the UFC Heavyweight Championship. |
| Win | 9–3 | Pedro Rizzo | Decision (unanimous) | UFC 26 | June 9, 2000 | 5 | 5:00 | Cedar Rapids, Iowa, United States | Defended the UFC Heavyweight Championship. |
| Win | 8–3 | Pete Williams | Decision (unanimous) | UFC 23 | November 19, 1999 | 5 | 5:00 | Urayasu, Japan | Won the vacant UFC Heavyweight Championship. |
| Loss | 7–3 | Bas Rutten | Decision (split) | UFC 20 | May 7, 1999 | 1 | 21:00 | Birmingham, Alabama, United States | For the vacant UFC Heavyweight Championship. Road To The Heavyweight Title Tournament Finals. |
| Win | 7–2 | Maurice Smith | Decision (unanimous) | UFC 19 | March 5, 1999 | 1 | 15:00 | Bay St. Louis, Mississippi, United States | Road to the Heavyweight Title Tournament Semifinals. |
| Loss | 6–2 | Tom Erikson | KO (punches) | Brazil Open-'97 | June 15, 1997 | 1 | 1:11 | Brazil | Brazil Open '97 Finals. |
| Win | 6–1 | Gustavo Homem de Neve | TKO (submission to elbow) | Brazil Open-'97 | June 15, 1997 | 1 | 2:21 | Brazil | Brazil Open '97 Semifinals. |
| Loss | 5–1 | Carlos Barreto | Technical Submission (triangle choke) | Universal Vale Tudo Fighting 6 | March 3, 1997 | 1 | 22:24 | Brazil | UVTF 6 Tournament Finals. |
| Win | 5–0 | Mário Neto | TKO (submission to punches) | Universal Vale Tudo Fighting 6 | March 3, 1997 | 1 | 11:24 | Brazil | UVTF 6 Tournament Semifinals. |
| Win | 4–0 | Ebenezer Fontes Braga | Decision | Universal Vale Tudo Fighting 6 | March 3, 1997 | 1 | 20:00 | Brazil | UVTF 6 Tournament Quarterfinals. |
| Win | 3–0 | Dan Bobish | TKO (submission to punches) | Universal Vale Tudo Fighting 4 | October 22, 1996 | 1 | 5:50 | Brazil | Won the UVTF 4 Tournament. |
| Win | 2–0 | Geza Kalman | TKO (punches) | Universal Vale Tudo Fighting 4 | October 22, 1996 | 1 | 7:37 | Brazil | UVTF 4 Tournament Semifinals. |
| Win | 1–0 | Luiz Carlos Maciel | TKO (submission to punches) | Universal Vale Tudo Fighting 4 | October 22, 1996 | 1 | 5:14 | Brazil | UVTF 4 Tournament Quarterfinals. |

| Vacant Title last held by Bas Rutten | 5th UFC Heavyweight Champion; November 14, 1999 – November 17, 2000 | Succeeded by Randy Couture |
