= Kimo Leopoldo =

American mixed martial artist

- Born: January 4, 1968 (age 58); Munich, West Germany
- Nationality: American
- Height: 6 ft 3 in (1.91 m)
- Weight: 235 lb (107 kg; 16.8 st)
- Division: Heavyweight
- Style: Folkstyle wrestling Brazilian Jiu-Jitsu
- Fighting out of: Santa Ana, California
- Team: Lord's Gym; Team Kimo; Gold's Gym Santa Ana 77
- Rank: Black belt in Brazilian Jiu-Jitsu under Joe Moreira; 4th dan in Taekwondo (alleged)
- Years active: 1994–2010

Kickboxing record
- Total: 3
- Wins: 0
- Losses: 3
- By knockout: 3

Mixed martial arts record
- Total: 18
- Wins: 10
- By knockout: 3
- By submission: 7
- Losses: 7
- By knockout: 2
- By submission: 4
- By decision: 1
- Draws: 1

Other information
- Mixed martial arts record from Sherdog

Kimo Leopoldo (born January 4, 1968), is an American retired mixed martial artist and actor. He made his MMA debut at UFC 3 in 1994, losing to Royce Gracie by submission. A professional from 1994 until 2011, he also competed in the PRIDE Fighting Championships, Cage Rage, and the World Fighting Alliance.

He debuted with Ultimate Fighting Championship at UFC 3 in 1994, where he faced two-time tournament champion Royce Gracie in the opening round and lost by submission. Despite the defeat, Leopoldo's size and wrestling made him one of Gracie's toughest opponents in the early UFC tournaments, and Gracie was unable to continue in the tournament after their bout. Leopoldo became a prominent figure in the early era of mixed martial arts, competing against several of the sport's best-known fighters. He fought Ken Shamrock for the UFC Superfight Championship at UFC 8, defeated Kazushi Sakuraba on his MMA debut, drew with Dan Severn in the inaugural PRIDE event Pride 1, and later defeated Tank Abbott by submission at UFC 43. He also competed in K-1, where he faced Bob Sapp in a highly publicized heavyweight bout. He also ventured into Japanese shoot-style professional wrestling, appearing for UWF International (UWFi) against Yoshihiro Takayama in 1996.

== Background ==
Leopoldo was born in Munich to an American father of Irish and Polynesian descent and a German mother of Jewish descent. Four months after he was born his family moved to Hawaii. Leopoldo was a natural athlete growing up, playing football and wrestling; he also had an interest in surfing. Leopoldo was a dominant wrestler at Waianae High School and played on the team that won the Hawaii High School Athletic Association Championship. Leopoldo was also a very talented middle linebacker in football, and attended the University of Washington on a partial athletic scholarship, but he was unprepared for college, and returned to Hawaii shortly after.

In Huntington Beach, California, he sought to renew his career in football. Going under the name "Kim Leopold" he quickly became an NJCAA All-American and gained interest from many Division I colleges. However, he tore both of his ACLs, and his success only lasted until the middle of his sophomore year. Depressed and with seemingly no future, he met Joe Son and turned to mixed martial arts after studying films of fights including UFC 1, among other fights featuring Royce Gracie, who Leopoldo would later make his debut against.

== Mixed martial arts career ==
Kimo Leopoldo made his Ultimate Fighting Championship at UFC 3, where he was presented as a third-degree black belt taekwondo fighter. Despite this, his actual competitive background was in collegiate wrestling, a discipline in which he had achieved considerable success before entering mixed martial arts and had no formal Taekwondo credentials, being awarded the belt and rank specifically for the show.

Kimo fought the reigning, defending UFC 1 and UFC 2 champion Royce Gracie in the first round. Although Gracie tried to take him down at all costs, Kimo stayed firmly on his feet, and even managed to capture his back in a failed trip. Royce reversed it and mounted him, but only briefly, as Kimo flipped Gracie over and landed multiple headbutts through his guard. The Brazilian fighter then grabbed Kimo's ponytail in an attempt to get the advantage, but it didn't stop Kimo from taking his back again standing. Finally, Royce pulled him down and locked an armbar, making Leopoldo submit. Even though Kimo lost, Royce couldn't fight two other bouts he had that night, and had to forfeit his match against Harold Howard. Kimo and his cornermen Joe Son featured a controversial moment that very night, when they jumped on the cage after Royce's forfeiting and started celebrating among the audience's chants.

After four straight wins in Japan, including a dominant win over UFC 2 finalist Pat Smith, Kimo returned at UFC 8 and fought reigning UFC champion Ken Shamrock in a title match for the UFC Superfight Championship, but lost early in the fight via submission due to a kneebar.

At that time, Kimo Leopoldo started training more deeply in various martial arts disciplines for MMA. After UFC 8 trained Brazilian jiu-jitsu under Joe Moreira and achieved black belt rank under him.

In 1996 Leopoldo fought in Japan on the Shoot Boxing – S-Cup 1996 event. Leopoldo was matched against Kazushi Sakuraba in an MMA-rules bout. Leopoldo won by arm-triangle choke in the first round. The bout is commonly cited as Sakuraba's professional MMA debut, although the legitimacy of the match has been disputed. In an interview, Sakuraba himself stated that he doesn't remember if it was a shoot or a worked match.

Later that year, Leopoldo fought against famed American professional wrestler Bam Bam Bigelow at Japanese event U-Japan. Notably, Leopoldo entered representing Brazilian Jiu-Jitsu after his time under Joe Moreira. Leopold took Bigelow down in the first minute and finished him off with a rear-naked choke. In a 1998 interview, Bigelow claimed that he had been asked to throw the fight and that he had been paid $100,000 (equivalent to $205,283 in 2025) for the fight.

Kimo then fought at the UFC's Ultimate Ultimate 1996. He won his first fight against UFC 7 finalist Paul Varelans, but withdrew from the tournament after the win due to exhaustion.

He then traveled to Japan and fought the former 3 time UFC champion Dan Severn in the inaugural Pride Fighting Championships event. A controversial contest, it took place primarily standing with both fighters nullifying the other's ability to strike. At the end of the contest Severn attempted to take Kimo down, however was unable because Kimo held onto the ropes. At the 29th minute Severn landed a take down, however it was a matter of too little too late and the contest was deemed a draw. Upon the final bell, commentator Stephen 'The Fight Professor' Quadros said 'the best thing about this fight is Dan Severn's post fight look', and in response to the Japanese crowd uncharacteristically booing, he said 'they're booing because they're relieved it's over'.

Kimo then returned for UFC 16 and fought top Japanese fighter Tsuyoshi Kohsaka. Kimo began the contest aggressive, securing a strong takedown and controlling Kohsaka for the first six and a half minutes. Kimo then began to fatigue and Kohsaka took advantage, restoring the fight back to its feet, before landing a stiff right jab to the face of Kimo. Clearly stunned by the punch, momentum immediately swung in Kohsaka's favour. Although Kimo held on for the remainder of the bout, Kohsaka won via unanimous decision, out scoring Kimo in striking, grappling, and octagon control.

After a four-year break from mixed martial arts, Kimo won a warm up fight against Tim Lajcik in the WFA in 2002. He then again returned to the UFC at UFC 43, where he quickly defeated David "Tank" Abbott by arm triangle choke. Kimo went on to fight in the main event of UFC 48, where he fought Ken Shamrock in a rematch. Kimo was knocked out in the first round from knees to the head. After the fight Kimo, tested positive for the steroid Stanozolol, also known as Winstrol, among other drugs. He was suspended for six months and fined $5,000 by the Nevada State Athletic Commission.

Kimo was to fight Bas Rutten at WFA: King of the Streets on July 22, 2006. However, he was forced off the card by the California State Athletic Commission, after testing positive for Stanozolol once again.

In his two most recent fights, Kimo lost to Dave Legeno by a guillotine choke submission. He then lost to Wes Sims by TKO in X-1.

== Kickboxing career ==
=== K-1 ===
Kimo made his kickboxing K-1 debut on March 3, 1995, at the K-1 Grand Prix '95 Opening Battle event in Tokyo, where he fought former world champion Masaaki Satake for the opportunity to compete in the K-1 Grand Prix '95 tournament. Kimo started aggressively, keeping his opponent on the defensive with powerful hooks. He tired as the round went on, allowing Satake to strike back with kicks to his head and body. In the second round, Satake scored three knockdowns over Kimo and thus earned a TKO victory.

Leopoldo competed again eight years later at the K-1 World Grand Prix 2003 in Las Vegas II event. He faced rising super heavyweight Bob Sapp in what turned out to be a brutal and controversial fight. As Sapp came forward with clubbing punches and knees, Kimo fought back with countering hooks, and the two fighters exchanged knockdowns in the first round. Sapp proved more dominant in the following round, swarming the UFC veteran before knocking him out with a rabbit punch. Despite Kimo's loss, the Las Vegas crowd cheered his name and booed Sapp in the aftermath. Referee Nobuaki Kakuda faced criticism for not penalizing Sapp's blatant foul and for allowing Sapp time to recover after failing to answer the bell for the second round.

Fighting his final kickboxing match to date at K-1 Burning 2004, Kimo endured a knockout loss to former amateur boxing champion Hiromi Amada. His current record stands at 0–3.

== Professional Wrestling career ==
In August 1996, Leopoldo made a brief foray into Japanese shoot-style pro wrestling, appearing at UWF International (UWFi)'s Mid-Summer event at Meiji Jingu Stadium against Yoshihiro Takayama. Leopoldo quickly took Takayama down and submitted him with a rear-naked choke in approximately one minute. The nature of the bout has been debated, with some accounts describing it as a legitimate shoot fight rather than a conventional worked UWFi match.

== Acting career ==
Leopoldo has worked since 1996 as an actor in independent productions. He starred in the Femme Fatales episode "Family Business", the direct to video production R.I.O.T.: The Movie and the films The Process, The Dog Problem, In the Closet, Bullet and Avengers Grimm.

== Personal life ==
In February 2009 Leopoldo was arrested in Tustin, California for possession of a controlled substance. In the police report Leopoldo was standing by his car, wearing sandals, playing with a yo-yo, and donning a Long Beach Police Department jumpsuit that can only be worn by the motor pool mechanics.

Various media outlets reported that Leopoldo had died from complications from a heart attack at age 41. Kevin Iole of Yahoo Sports reported on his Twitter that Leopoldo's publicist refuted reports that Leopoldo was in Costa Rica and instead was seen alive in Orange County the night before. At a July 21, 2009, press conference Leopoldo denied anyone close to him created the rumor, he also expressed his desire to return to fight one last time.

Kimo is well known for his Christian beliefs: he sports many religious tattoos, and entered the arena at UFC 3 carrying a large cross on his back.

== Career accomplishments ==
=== Mixed martial arts ===
- Ultimate Fighting Championship
  - UFC Encyclopedia Awards
    - Fight of the Night (Two times) vs. Royce Gracie and Tsuyoshi Kohsaka
    - Knockout of the Night (One time) vs. Paul Varelans
    - Submission of the Night (One time) vs. Tank Abbott

== Mixed martial arts record ==
Professional record breakdown
| 18 matches | 10 wins | 7 losses |
| By knockout | 3 | 2 |
| By submission | 7 | 4 |
| By decision | 0 | 1 |
| Draws | 1 | |

| Res. | Record | Opponent | Method | Event | Date | Round | Time | Location | Notes |
|---|---|---|---|---|---|---|---|---|---|
| Loss | 10–7–1 | Wes Sims | TKO (punches) | Extreme Wars 5: Battlegrounds | October 6, 2006 | 1 | 3:21 | Honolulu, Hawaii, United States | |
| Loss | 10–6–1 | Dave Legeno | Submission (guillotine choke) | Cage Rage 18 | September 30, 2006 | 1 | 3:21 | London, England | |
| Loss | 10–5–1 | Ikuhisa Minowa | Submission (achilles lock) | Pride Bushido 8 | July 17, 2005 | 1 | 3:11 | Nagoya, Japan | |
| Win | 10–4–1 | Marcus Royster | Submission (forearm choke) | Rumble on the Rock 7 | May 7, 2005 | 1 | 4:18 | Honolulu, Hawaii, United States | |
| Loss | 9–4–1 | Ken Shamrock | KO (knee) | UFC 48 | June 19, 2004 | 1 | 1:26 | Las Vegas, Nevada, United States | |
| Win | 9–3–1 | Tank Abbott | Submission (arm-triangle choke) | UFC 43 | June 6, 2003 | 1 | 1:59 | Las Vegas, Nevada, United States | |
| Win | 8–3–1 | Tim Lajcik | TKO (broken toe) | WFA 2: Level 2 | July 5, 2002 | 1 | 1:55 | Las Vegas, Nevada, United States | |
| Loss | 7–3–1 | Tsuyoshi Kohsaka | Decision (unanimous) | UFC 16 | March 13, 1998 | 1 | 15:00 | Kenner, Louisiana, United States | |
| Draw | 7–2–1 | Dan Severn | Draw | PRIDE 1 | October 11, 1997 | 1 | 30:00 | Tokyo, Japan | |
| Win | 7–2 | Brian Johnston | Submission (forearm choke) | Ultimate Explosion | April 16, 1997 | 1 | 1:43 | Honolulu, Hawaii, United States | |
| Win | 6–2 | Paul Varelans | TKO (corner stoppage) | Ultimate Ultimate 1996 | December 7, 1996 | 1 | 9:08 | Birmingham, Alabama, United States | |
| Win | 5–2 | Scott Bigelow | Submission (rear-naked choke) | U-Japan | November 17, 1996 | 1 | 2:15 | Japan | |
| Win | 4–2 | Yoshihiro Takayama | Submission (rear-naked choke) | Meiji Jingu Stadium Open Air MMA | August 17, 1996 | 1 | 1:20 | Tokyo, Japan | |
| Win | 3–2 | Kazushi Sakuraba | Submission (arm-triangle choke) | Shoot Boxing – S-Cup 1996 | July 14, 1996 | 1 | 4:20 | Tokyo, Japan | |
| Loss | 2–2 | Ken Shamrock | Submission (kneebar) | UFC 8 | February 16, 1996 | 1 | 4:24 | Bayamón, Puerto Rico | For the UFC Superfight Championship. |
| Win | 2–1 | Fred Floyd | Submission (rear-naked choke) | United Full Contact Federation 1 | September 8, 1995 | 1 | 0:47 | Sapporo, Japan | |
| Win | 1–1 | Patrick Smith | TKO (submission to punches) | K-1 Legend | December 10, 1994 | 1 | 3:00 | Nagoya, Japan | |
| Loss | 0–1 | Royce Gracie | Submission (armlock) | UFC 3 | September 9, 1994 | 1 | 4:40 | Charlotte, North Carolina, United States | |

== Kickboxing record ==
| Date | Result | Opponent | Event | Location | Method | Round | Time |
|---|---|---|---|---|---|---|---|
| 2004-2-15 | Loss | (Japan) Hiromi Amada | K-1 Burning 2004 | Okinawa, Japan | KO (left hook) | 2 | 2:06 |
| 2003-8-15 | Loss | (United States) Bob Sapp | K-1 WORLD GP 2003 IN LAS VEGAS | Las Vegas, Nevada, United States | KO (punch) | 2 | 1:11 |
| 1995-3-3 | Loss | (Japan) Masaaki Satake | K-1 Grand Prix '95 Opening Battle | Tokyo, Japan | TKO (3 knockdowns, left middle kick) | 2 | 2:27 |
Fails to qualify for K-1 World Grand Prix 1995.

Legend: Win Loss Draw/No contest Notes
