= Gary Goodridge =

Canadian kickboxer and mixed martial artist

- Born: January 17, 1966 (age 60); Saint James, Port of Spain, Trinidad and Tobago
- Other names: Big Daddy
- Nationality: Trinidadian; Canadian
- Height: 6 ft 3 in (1.91m)
- Weight: 240 lb (109 kg; 17 st 2 lb)
- Division: Heavyweight; Openweight
- Fighting out of: Barrie, Ontario, Canada
- Team: Team Go-Riki
- Rank: Honorary 4th Dan Black Belt in Kuk Sool Won
- Years active: 1996–2010 (MMA); 1999–2010 (kickboxing)

Kickboxing record
- Total: 54
- Wins: 28
- By knockout: 11
- Losses: 24
- By knockout: 14
- Draws: 2

Mixed martial arts record
- Total: 46
- Wins: 23
- By knockout: 16
- By submission: 6
- By decision: 1
- Losses: 22
- By knockout: 10
- By submission: 8
- By decision: 4
- Draws: 1

Other information
- Notable relatives: Sharon Goodridge (sister); Shirma Goodridge (sister); Lisa Goodridge (sister)
- Mixed martial arts record from Sherdog

Gary Goodridge (born January 17, 1966) is a Trinidadian-Canadian former heavyweight kickboxer and mixed martial artist fighting out of Barrie, Ontario. Prior to kickboxing and MMA, he was also one of the top ranked contenders in the world of professional arm wrestling. In early 2012, Goodridge was diagnosed with early onset of chronic traumatic encephalopathy (CTE).

== Early life ==
Goodridge was born in Saint James, Port of Spain, Trinidad and Tobago before moving to Barrie, Ontario, Canada. Prior to his career in combat sports, he worked as a welder at the Honda factory in Alliston, Ontario.

He was a world champion in arm wrestling, and was able to defeat the likes of greats Sharon Remez and John Brzenk in 1991 and again in 1994. Goodridge started competing in amateur boxing after only a few months of training under Norm Bell. He proceeded to win his first seven fights and won the Canadian National Amateur Boxing Championship at super heavyweight with a TKO of Scott McLellan of New Waterford Nova Scotia. Goodridge then lost his first international match against American boxer David Bostice, and decided to change sports rather than proceed with boxing.

== Mixed martial arts career ==
Goodridge originally applied for Ultimate Fighting Championship at his friends' suggestion after they watched the fight between Remco Pardoel and Orlando Wiet in UFC 2. He started training in a Kuk Sool Won school, as he wanted some martial arts credentials aside from his boxing championship, only to find out that the school was already training a fighter to compete in UFC. Gary was forced to fight him, and he won in dominant fashion, so he was quickly offered a 4th degree black belt and a free dobok if he represented the school at the event. He ended up going to UFC 8 with less than a month's experience in the art.

=== Ultimate Fighting Championship ===
In 1996, Goodridge made his debut in UFC in the eight-man tournament at UFC 8: David vs. Goliath in San Juan, Puerto Rico. He first went against amateur wrestler Paul Herrera, whom Goodridge outweighed by 73 lbs. In order to increase Goodridge's will to fight, he had been told by his friends that Herrera and his teammate Tank Abbott were white supremacists. The resultant fight would be a spectacular knockout, as Herrera shot for a fireman's carry only to be caught in a crucifix position by Goodridge, who then proceeded to deliver multiple elbow strikes to the helpless Herrera's head, ending the bout in 13 seconds. The first elbow strike landed on Herrera's temple and knocked him unconscious, but the fight was not stopped until Goodridge landed seven more blows, giving Herrera a concussion and a broken cheekbone. According to Goodridge, the hold had been planned by him and his cornermen after they casually witnessed Herrera training intensively his fireman's carry takeovers, although they had originally conceived it to set up a wrist lock, not strikes.

Goodridge advanced to second round, where he faced Lion's Den fighter Jerry Bohlander. Goodridge made usage of his strength advantage to control Bohlander, but he got swept and received punches and headbutts until he could escape from Bohlander's mount. Eventually Goodridge stacked him against the fence and landed two heavy right hooks, knocking Jerry out. Before his match at the finals against future legend Don Frye, Goodridge considered quitting for an alternate due to exhaustion and lack of preparation, but he accepted the fight in order to collect the bout money. Goodridge opened the fight throwing Frye to the mat with a waist lock and trying to get a finishing kick to the head, only for Frye to escape and punish him with uppercuts from the clinch. Gary managed to take him down again and capture his back, but Frye reversed and rained punches, making a tired Goodridge tap out.

Goodridge returned at UFC 9: Motor City Madness in a non-tournament bout against Olympic wrestler Mark Schultz. The wrestler controlled the fight by taking Gary down and grinding him with short punches, and eventually landed a flurry of blows from the mount as the time ran out. Instead of going to the overtime period, the referee stopped the fight due to cuts in Goodridge's face, which Schultz had rubbed in order to deepen them. On July 12, 1996, at UFC 10: The Tournament, Goodridge took part in his second UFC tournament. He first fought wrestler John Campetella, knocking him out with left punches from the mount after reversing a takedown, and advanced round against wrestling champion and eventual winner Mark Coleman. Goodridge was taken down repeatedly, struck with elbows and headbutts and finally submitted for giving his back.

His next UFC match came on December 7, 1996, at Ultimate Ultimate 1996, in a rematch against Don Frye. After trading strikes inside the clinch, Goodridge scored a takedown and started punishing Frye with headbutts. However, Frye reached for two armbars attempts and got free, performing his own takedown, and then Goodridge tapped out due to exhaustion just like their first time.

=== Vale tudo ===
Following his UFC career, Goodridge travelled to Brazil to compete in vale tudo. His first match was against Mario "Sukata" Neto, which ended in 6:02 when Goodridge tapped out again due to exhaustion.

On July 6, 1997, Goodridge participated in the first International Vale Tudo Championship tournament. He submitted Augusto Menezes Santos, improvising a neck crank from a standing double underhook position, and then fellow UFC veteran Cal Worsham, locking a keylock, both in a combined time of 0:75. He then advanced to the finals, where he faced luta livre stylist Pedro Otavio. As the IVC ruleset allowed groin shots, the fight featured multiple low blows intertwined with their grappling exchanges. In a particularly brutal instance, Goodridge capitalized on having Otavio in a butterfly guard to get his feet inside the Brazilian's tights and squeeze his testicles with his toes. Finally, after grabbing again Otavio's testicles from a clinch, Goodridge overpowered him and landed strikes for the KO, winning the tournament.

=== PRIDE Fighting Championships ===
==== Earlier events ====
In late 1997, Goodridge was recruited to compete in Japan's PRIDE Fighting Championships and made his promotional debut in its very first event PRIDE1 on October 11. Facing Russian grappler and UFC tournament winner Oleg Taktarov, Goodridge showed his superiority by stunning and punishing him with strikes, both standing and on the ground, before scoring a brutal knockout by right hook. Taktarov was rendered unconscious and had to be taken away on a stretcher.

Goodridge returned at PRIDE 2 on March 15, 1998, where he faced UFC 7 tournament winner and Brazilian luta livre fighter Marco Ruas. Goodridge dominated most of the match, cutting Ruas with a punch and landing ground and pound on the mat, but as they were restarted on the feet, a slip allowed Ruas to come back with his own offense. Although Goodridge immediately took Ruas down as well, the Brazilian capitalized on the lapse to catch him in a heel hook for the tap out.

At PRIDE 3, Goodridge faced Bas Rutten trainee Amir Rahnavardi, who looked to exchange strikes before being knocked down with Gary on top. The UFC veteran punished Rahnavardi with punches while the latter attempted leglocks and triangle chokes to no avail; at one point Goodridge theatrically shouted Amir to hit him back. Though Rahnavardi threw some strikes from the bottom, Goodridge landed a barrage of punches and knocked him out.

Goodridge's last consecutive PRIDE appearance was in PRIDE 4, where he fought Ukrainian kickboxer Igor Vovchanchyn in the latter's debut fight. Warned of Igor's reputation as a powerful striker, Goodridge took him down, but a mistake allowed Igor to scramble back to his feet. The UFC fighter pressed on, bloodying Vovchanchyn and taking him down again, only for Igor to break the clinch and land two solid left hooks that knocked Goodridge out on his feet.

Following a brief return to the UFC in 1999, when he quickly submitted Andre Roberts at UFC 19: Ultimate Young Guns, Goodridge met Olympic judoka Naoya Ogawa at Pride 6. He landed blows against the inexperienced Ogawa, but the judoka eventually took him down and started attempting submissions. In the second round, Ogawa swept Goodridge and finally locked an ude-garami, making him tap out.

It was rumored that Goodridge had been paid to throw the fight, but Gary himself said in an interview that, although he was effectively proposed an anonymous money bribe to let Ogawa win, he rejected it and fought for real, thus losing legitimately to Ogawa. He added that PRIDE executive Nobuyuki Sakakibara had promised him "to write his own ticket" if he defeated Ogawa in order to increase his motivation. In his autobiography, Goodridge also remarked that he was only offered $20,000 to throw the fight and believed he could earn far more in salary negotiations simply by beating Ogawa, a then-rising prospect.

==== PRIDE Grand Prix and gatekeeping ====
On January 20, 2000, Goodridge took part in the sixteen-man, open weight tournament PRIDE Grand Prix 2000. His first opponent was a debutant, former professional wrestler Osamu "Tachihikari" Kawahara, whom Goodridge defeated via choke in under a minute. His quarter-finals adversary would be Igor Vovchanchyn, who knocked out Goodridge for the second time after a battle contested mainly with punches. Goodridge was eliminated from the tournament, but continued to cement his status as PRIDE's gatekeeper, which gave name to his official biography.

His short tenure in the tournament was echoed in the results of his next two matches, starting with a match against highly regarded grappler Ricco Rodriguez. The debutant Rodriguez attempted repeated takedowns in the first round, but Goodridge was able to block most of his offense and land opportunistic strikes. In the second round, however, Rodriguez scored an early takedown and dominated the Trinidadian with ground and pound, ultimately gaining the decision win. The second bout was a short affair against RINGS Japan veteran Gilbert Yvel at PRIDE 10. Both men looked to strike, but Yvel moved first and landed a left roundhouse kick to the head, knocking his opponent out.

Goodridge finally bounced back against Yoshiaki Yatsu, another professional wrestling veteran making his debut, at PRIDE 11. Despite Yatsu's Olympic amateur wrestling credentials, Goodridge easily avoided his takedowns, while landing regular leg kicks and one-two combos. The wrestler eventually took Gary down, but the latter escaped from his leglock attempt and caused a momentary pause after landing an illegal knee. After the restart, however, Goodridge swarmed him with uppercuts until the referee called a stop to the bout.

The Trinidadian continued his streak by defeating another RINGS Japan fighter, Bob Schrijber, in an event in Holland, and a third, Valentijn Overeem, in his return to PRIDE. The last was especially notable, as after outstriking Overeem and negating his guard, Goodridge avoided a Kimura lock, thanks in part to his arm wrestling skill. He then landed a heavy knee strike (now legal) and followed with ground and pound until the TKO.

The streak stopped at PRIDE 15, however, against the debutant RINGS King of Kings champion Antônio Rodrigo Nogueira. His debut was going to be against Mark Coleman, but the latter pulled out due to an injury and Goodridge stepped in on short notice. The bout was short, although Goodridge worked to avoid his adversary's Brazilian jiu-jitsu expertise, Nogueira managed to bring him to his guard and lock a triangle choke for the win.

At the end of 2002, Goodridge participated in the K-1 Andy Memorial event, submitting superheavyweight kickboxer Jan Nortje by armbar, and also rematched Yoshiaki Yatsu, beating him with strikes in even less time than the first time. His last fight of the year was a special "K-1 vs. PRIDE" rules bout against vale tudo fighter Ebenezer Fontes Braga in Inoki Bom-Ba-Ye, which ended in a draw.

==== Last matches ====
Goodridge started 2002 opposite to Achmed Labasanov from Russian Top Team (former RINGS Russia) at PRIDE 21. The Russian opened strong and controlled the Trinidadian on the mat, but Goodridge scrambled, managed to get on top, and scored knees and punches for some minutes. The second round would be slower, as Labasanov took Goodridge down yet performed no attacks, which prompted Goodridge to scream "hit me!" in frustration. At the third, Goodridge took over and scored knees and punches for the unanimous decision. At PRIDE Shockwave 2002, Gary faced Dutch kickboxer Lloyd van Dams, whom he defeated quickly by takedown and ground and pound despite the Dutchman's size advantage.

After a hiatus of a year, Goodridge would fight another Russian Top Team exponent, Fedor Emelianenko, who made short work of him by punches, knees and soccer kicks in 1:09. Goodridge returned to PRIDE after some months, fighting fellow UFC veteran Dan Bobish. The match met a controversial ending, as Goodridge knocked him out with a punching combination while Bobish was trying to signal an eye gouge to the referee.

Goodridge had his official retirement fight at PRIDE Shockwave 2003 after six years of fighting for PRIDE. It would make for a rubber match against his old UFC rival Don Frye, who was similarly past his prime after his own long career. Goodridge would write in his autobiography that he had to receive numbing injections in his lower back only to be able to walk, while Frye himself looked in pain just to get up from his chair. Despite those difficulties, Goodridge dominated the scuffle with strikes and ended up knocking out Frye with a right roundhouse kick to the head. Goodridge was then met with a standing ovation while he celebrated with Frye and PRIDE executives Nobuyuki Sakakibara and Nobuhiko Takada, who presided his retirement ceremony. The instance was so emotional that commentator Stephen Quadros was quoted as: "Hollywood could not have scripted a better ending for [Goodridge's] career."

Despite the end of his contract with PRIDE, Goodridge would return to the ring just months later in the K-1 and Hero's organizations, for which he fought both kickboxing and MMA matches.

=== HERO'S ===
In 2004, Goodridge began competing for the K-1 promotion's HERO'S series. In his promotional debut, he knocked out pro wrestler Sylvester Terkay in round 1 at K-1 MMA ROMANEX. On March 26, 2005, at HERO'S 1, Goodridge defeated Russian sumo wrestler Alan Karaev by submission.

Following this, he lost to fellow PRIDE veteran Heath Herring at HERO'S by knockout on March 15, 2006. At HERO'S 8 on March 12, 2007, Goodridge beat South African Jan "The Giant" Nortje via TKO. This would be his last professional victory despite going on to compete for a further three years.

== Kickboxing career ==
Goodridge made his kickboxing debut in 1999 at K-1 Revenge, against Musashi and lost the fight by disqualification. His first win in K-1 came against Mike Bernardo by technical knockout at the K-1 World Grand Prix 2002 in Las Vegas in 2002. Following this, he took part in the opening round of the 2002 K-1 World Grand Prix against Jérôme Le Banner and was knocked out 42 seconds into the match.

In 2005, Goodridge participated in two K-1 World GP tournaments held in United States. On April 30 in Las Vegas he knocked out Sean O'Haire and Scott Lighty to reach the finals of the K-1 World Grand Prix 2005 in Las Vegas, where he was stopped by Glaube Feitosa with a high kick KO. Three months later, on July 30, 2005, in Honolulu, Hawaii he scored three KO wins over Wesley Correira, Carter Williams and Yusuke Fujimoto, respectively, to win the K-1 World Grand Prix 2005 in Hawaii. He was again given the chance to qualify for the World GP in 2005 but was knocked out by Jérôme Le Banner once again.

In 2006, he returned to the K-1 World Grand Prix 2006 in Las Vegas where he defeated Kengo and Scott Lighty before losing to Chalid Arrab by knockout in the final.

== Personal life ==
Goodridge is Muslim, and first made the revelation in July 2018 while on The Deen Show. Goodridge, and co-author Mark Dorsey, published in December 2011, Gatekeeper: The Fighting Life of Gary "Big Daddy" Goodridge. The book details his experience in UFC, Pride and K1, along with detailed personal information about his life and family. Resulting from his martial arts career, Goodridge has chronic traumatic encephalopathy.

Goodridge stated in a 2010 interview that prior to his bout with Naoya Ogawa at Pride 6 in 1999, he was offered a bribe to lose the match. He claims that he turned it down as the offer was too small, and he lost that bout legitimately.

== Championships and accomplishments ==
=== Mixed martial arts ===
- International Vale Tudo Championship
  - 1st I.V.C Tournament champion
- Ultimate Fighting Championship
  - UFC 8 Tournament runner-up
  - UFC 10 Tournament semifinalist
  - Ultimate Ultimate 1996 Tournament quarterfinalist
  - UFC Encyclopedia Awards
    - Fight of the Night (one time) vs. Jerry Bohlander
    - Knockout of the Night (one time) vs. Paul Herrera
- Pride Fighting Championships
  - PRIDE Grand Prix 2000 quarterfinalist

Kickboxing

- K-1
  - 2005 K-1 World Grand Prix in Hawaii champion
  - 2005 K-1 World Grand Prix in Las Vegas runner up
  - 2006 K-1 World Grand Prix in Las Vegas runner up

Amateur boxing

- Super Heavyweight Champion of Canada

Kuk Sool Won

- Honorary 4th Degree Black Belt (Sa Beom Nim)

Professional armwrestling

- Most gold medals earned from WAF worlds by any Canadian armwrestler

== Mixed martial arts record ==
Professional record breakdown
| 46 matches | 23 wins | 22 losses |
| By knockout | 16 | 10 |
| By submission | 6 | 8 |
| By decision | 1 | 4 |
| Draws | 1 | |

| Res. | Record | Opponent | Method | Event | Date | Round | Time | Location | Notes |
|---|---|---|---|---|---|---|---|---|---|
| Loss | 23–22–1 | Lyubomir Simeonov | TKO (punches) | Bulgarian MMA Federation: Warriors 18 | December 17, 2010 | 1 | 3:01 | Sofia, Bulgaria | |
| Loss | 23–21–1 | Pedro Rizzo | TKO (retirement) | Washington Combat | May 15, 2010 | 2 | 5:00 | Washington, D.C., United States | |
| Loss | 23–20–1 | Gegard Mousasi | TKO (punches) | Dynamite!! The Power of Courage 2009 | December 31, 2009 | 1 | 1:34 | Saitama, Saitama, Japan | |
| Loss | 23–19–1 | Alistair Overeem | Submission (keylock) | United Glory 10 | November 9, 2008 | 1 | 1:47 | Arnhem, Netherlands | |
| Loss | 23–18–1 | Paul Buentello | Decision (unanimous) | Affliction: Banned | July 19, 2008 | 3 | 5:00 | Anaheim, California, United States | |
| Loss | 23–17–1 | Terroll Dees | Decision (unanimous) | Iroquois MMA Championships 4 | June 21, 2008 | 3 | 5:00 | Ontario, Canada | |
| Loss | 23–16–1 | Choi Mu-Bae | KO (punch) | The Khan 1 | March 30, 2008 | 2 | N/A | Seoul, South Korea | |
| Win | 23–15–1 | Jan Nortje | TKO (punches) | Hero's 8 | March 12, 2007 | 1 | 3:00 | Nagoya, Japan | |
| Win | 22–15–1 | Tadas Rimkevicius | TKO (punches) | Hero's Lithuania 2006 | November 11, 2006 | 1 | 4:31 | Lithuania | |
| Loss | 21–15–1 | Heath Herring | TKO (punches) | Hero's 4 | March 15, 2006 | 2 | 1:55 | Tokyo, Japan | |
| Win | 21–14–1 | Alan Karaev | Submission (forearm choke) | Hero's 1 | March 26, 2005 | 1 | 2:58 | Saitama, Saitama, Japan | |
| Win | 20–14–1 | Sylvester Terkay | TKO (punches) | K-1 MMA ROMANEX | May 22, 2004 | 1 | 1:22 | Saitama, Saitama, Japan | |
| Win | 19–14–1 | Don Frye | KO (head kick) | PRIDE Shockwave 2003 | December 31, 2003 | 1 | 0:39 | Saitama, Saitama, Japan | |
| Win | 18–14–1 | Dan Bobish | TKO (punches) | PRIDE Final Conflict 2003 | November 9, 2003 | 1 | 0:18 | Tokyo, Japan | |
| Loss | 17–14–1 | Fedor Emelianenko | TKO (soccer kicks and punches) | PRIDE Total Elimination 2003 | August 10, 2003 | 1 | 1:09 | Saitama, Saitama, Japan | |
| Win | 17–13–1 | Lloyd van Dams | TKO (punches) | PRIDE Shockwave 2002 | August 28, 2002 | 1 | 3:39 | Tokyo, Japan | |
| Win | 16–13–1 | Achmed Labasanov | Decision (split) | PRIDE 21 | June 23, 2002 | 3 | 5:00 | Saitama, Saitama, Japan | |
| Draw | 15–13–1 | Ebenezer Fontes Braga | Draw | Inoki Bom-Ba-Ye 2001 | December 31, 2001 | 5 | 3:00 | Saitama, Saitama, Japan | Special K-1 vs. Pride rules bout. |
| Win | 15–13 | Yoshiaki Yatsu | TKO (corner stoppage) | PRIDE 16 | September 24, 2001 | 1 | 3:03 | Osaka, Japan | |
| Win | 14–13 | Jan Nortje | Submission (armbar) | K-1 Andy Memorial 2001 Japan GP Final | August 19, 2001 | 1 | 1:11 | Saitama, Saitama, Japan | |
| Loss | 13–13 | Antônio Rodrigo Nogueira | Submission (triangle choke) | PRIDE 15 | July 29, 2001 | 1 | 2:37 | Saitama, Saitama, Japan | |
| Win | 13–12 | Valentijn Overeem | TKO (submission to knee) | PRIDE 14 | May 27, 2001 | 1 | 2:39 | Yokohama, Japan | |
| Win | 12–12 | Bob Schrijber | Submission (kneebar) | 2 Hot 2 Handle 2 | March 18, 2001 | 1 | 2:32 | Rotterdam, the Netherlands | |
| Win | 11–12 | Yoshiaki Yatsu | TKO (punches) | PRIDE 11 | October 31, 2000 | 1 | 8:58 | Osaka, Japan | |
| Loss | 10–12 | Gilbert Yvel | KO (head kick) | PRIDE 10 | August 27, 2000 | 1 | 0:28 | Saitama, Saitama, Japan | |
| Loss | 10–11 | Ricco Rodriguez | Decision (unanimous) | PRIDE 9 | June 4, 2000 | 2 | 10:00 | Nagoya, Japan | |
| Loss | 10–10 | Igor Vovchanchyn | TKO (punches) | PRIDE Grand Prix 2000 Finals | May 1, 2000 | 1 | 10:14 | Tokyo, Japan | PRIDE Grand Prix 2000 Quarterfinals. |
| Win | 10–9 | Osamu Kawahara | Submission (forearm choke) | PRIDE Grand Prix 2000 Opening Round | January 30, 2000 | 1 | 0:51 | Tokyo, Japan | PRIDE Grand Prix 2000 Opening Round. |
| Loss | 9–9 | Tom Erikson | Decision (unanimous) | PRIDE 8 | November 21, 1999 | 2 | 10:00 | Tokyo, Japan | |
| Loss | 9–8 | Naoya Ogawa | Submission (keylock) | PRIDE 6 | July 4, 1999 | 2 | 0:36 | Yokohama, Japan | |
| Win | 9–7 | Andre Roberts | TKO (submission to punch) | UFC 19 | March 5, 1999 | 1 | 0:43 | Bay St. Louis, Mississippi, United States | |
| Loss | 8–7 | Igor Vovchanchyn | TKO (punches) | PRIDE 4 | October 11, 1998 | 1 | 5:58 | Tokyo, Japan | |
| Win | 8–6 | Amir Rahnavardi | KO (punches) | PRIDE 3 | June 24, 1998 | 1 | 7:22 | Tokyo, Japan | |
| Loss | 7–6 | Marco Ruas | Submission (heel hook) | PRIDE 2 | March 15, 1998 | 1 | 9:09 | Yokohama, Japan | |
| Win | 7–5 | Oleg Taktarov | KO (punch) | PRIDE 1 | October 11, 1997 | 1 | 4:57 | Tokyo, Japan | |
| Win | 6–5 | Pedro Otavio | TKO (submission to punches) | International Vale Tudo Championship 1 | July 6, 1997 | 1 | 16:15 | Brazil | Won the IVC 1 Tournament. |
| Win | 5–5 | Cal Worsham | Submission (keylock) | International Vale Tudo Championship 1 | July 6, 1997 | 1 | 0:43 | Brazil | IVC 1 Tournament Semifinals. |
| Win | 4–5 | Augusto Menezes Santos | Submission (crucifix) | International Vale Tudo Championship 1 | July 6, 1997 | 1 | 0:32 | Brazil | IVC 1 Tournament Quarterfinals. |
| Loss | 3–5 | Mario Neto | Submission (no apparent reason) | Universal Vale Tudo Fighting 6 | March 3, 1997 | 1 | 6:02 | Brazil | |
| Loss | 3–4 | Don Frye | Submission (fatigue) | Ultimate Ultimate 1996 | December 7, 1996 | 1 | 11:19 | Birmingham, Alabama, United States | Ultimate Ultimate 1996 Quarterfinals. |
| Loss | 3–3 | Mark Coleman | Submission (exhaustion) | UFC 10 | July 12, 1996 | 1 | 7:00 | Birmingham, Alabama, United States | UFC 10 Tournament Semifinals. |
| Win | 3–2 | John Campetella | KO (punches) | UFC 10 | July 12, 1996 | 1 | 1:28 | Birmingham, Alabama, United States | UFC 10 Tournament Quarterfinals. |
| Loss | 2–2 | Mark Schultz | TKO (cut) | UFC 9 | May 17, 1996 | 1 | 12:00 | Detroit, Michigan, United States | |
| Loss | 2–1 | Don Frye | TKO (submission to punches) | UFC 8 | February 16, 1996 | 1 | 2:14 | San Juan, Puerto Rico | UFC 8 Tournament Finals. |
| Win | 2–0 | Jerry Bohlander | TKO (punches) | UFC 8 | February 16, 1996 | 1 | 5:31 | San Juan, Puerto Rico | UFC 8 Tournament Semifinals. |
| Win | 1–0 | Paul Herrera | KO (elbows) | UFC 8 | February 16, 1996 | 1 | 0:13 | San Juan, Puerto Rico | UFC 8 Tournament Quarterfinals. |

== Kickboxing record (incomplete) ==
Kickboxing record
12 wins (11 (T)KOs, 1 decision), 24 losses (14 (T)KO's, 9 decisions, 1 DQ), 2 draws
| Date | Result | Opponent | Event | Location | Method | Round | Time | Record | Notes |
| November 27, 2010 | Loss | (Romania) Cătălin Moroşanu | K-1 Scandinavia Rumble of the Kings 2010 | Stockholm, Sweden | TKO (referee stoppage) | 2 | 2:10 | 12–24–2 | |
| October 24, 2010 | Loss | (Germany) Jerry Otto | La Onda Fight Night: Blood In Blood Out | Magdeburg, Germany | Decision (unanimous) | 3 | 3:00 | 12–23–2 | |
| February 13, 2010 | Loss | (Croatia) Igor Mihaljevic | Noc skorpiona 6 | Karlovac, Croatia | Decision (unanimous) | 3 | 3:00 | 12–22–2 | |
| December 12, 2008 | Loss | (Romania) Cătălin Moroşanu | Local Kombat 32 | Ploieşti, Romania | TKO (corner stoppage) | 2 | 3:00 | 12–21–2 | For World Kickboxing Network Intercontinental Heavyweight Championship. |
| August 16, 2008 | Loss | (Japan) Hiromi Amada | DEEP: Gladiators | Okayama, Japan | Decision (unanimous) | 3 | 3:00 | 12–20–2 | |
| December 15, 2007 | Loss | (Czech Republic) Lubos Suda | K-1 Fighting Network Prague 2007 | Prague, Czech Republic | Decision (unanimous) | 3 | 3:00 | 12–19–2 | |
| October 13, 2007 | Draw | (Latvia) Konstantin Gluhov | K-1 Fighting Network Latvia 2007 | Riga, Latvia | Draw | 3 | 3:00 | 12–18–2 | |
| August 5, 2007 | Loss | (South Korea) Choi Hong-man | K-1 World Grand Prix 2007 in Hong Kong | Hong Kong | KO (knee) | 1 | 1:34 | 12–18–1 | |
| April 4, 2007 | Loss | (United States) Patrick Barry | K-1 World Grand Prix 2007 in Hawaii | Honolulu, Hawaii, USA | TKO (referee stoppage) | 1 | 1:07 | 12–17–1 | 2007 Hawaii Grand Prix quarter-final. |
| September 30, 2006 | Loss | (Netherlands) Remy Bonjasky | K-1 World Grand Prix 2006 in Osaka opening round | Osaka, Japan | KO (knee) | 3 | 0:52 | 12–16–1 | 2006 K-1 World Grand Prix opening round. |
| August 12, 2006 | Loss | (United States) Carter Williams | K-1 World Grand Prix 2006 in Las Vegas II | Las Vegas, Nevada, USA | Decision (unanimous) | 3 | 3:00 | 12–15–1 | 2006 Las Vegas Grand Prix II quarter-final. |
| July 30, 2006 | Loss | (Netherlands) Peter Aerts | K-1 World Grand Prix 2006 in Sapporo | Sapporo, Japan | Decision (unanimous) | 3 | 3:00 | 12–14–1 | |
| April 29, 2006 | Loss | (Morocco) Chalid Arrab | K-1 World Grand Prix 2006 in Las Vegas | Las Vegas, Nevada, USA | KO (right hook) | 3 | 1:00 | 12–13–1 | 2006 Las Vegas Grand Prix final. |
| April 29, 2006 | Win | (United States) Scott Lighty | K-1 World Grand Prix 2006 in Las Vegas | Las Vegas, Nevada, USA | TKO (referee stoppage) | 1 | 0:34 | 12–12–1 | 2006 Las Vegas Grand Prix semi-final. |
| April 29, 2006 | Win | (Japan) Kengo | K-1 World Grand Prix 2006 in Las Vegas | Las Vegas, Nevada, USA | KO (right hook) | 1 | 0:40 | 11–12–1 | 2006 Las Vegas Grand Prix quarter-final. |
| February 17, 2006 | Loss | (Belarus) Alexey Ignashov | K-1 European League 2006 in Budapest | Budapest, Hungary | Decision | 3 | 3:00 | 10–12–1 | |
| November 19, 2005 | Loss | (Brazil) Glaube Feitosa | K-1 World Grand Prix 2005 in Tokyo Final | Tokyo, Japan | Decision (unanimous) | 3 | 3:00 | 10–11–1 | |
| September 23, 2005 | Loss | (France) Jérôme Le Banner | K-1 World Grand Prix 2005 in Osaka – final elimination | Osaka, Japan | TKO (three knockdowns) | 1 | 2:13 | 10–10–1 | 2005 K-1 World Grand Prix opening round. |
| July 29, 2005 | Win | (Japan) Yusuke Fujimoto | K-1 World Grand Prix 2005 in Hawaii | Honolulu, Hawaii, USA | TKO (corner stoppage) | 3 | 1:19 | 10–9–1 | 2005 Hawaii Grand Prix final. |
| July 29, 2005 | Win | (United States) Carter Williams | K-1 World Grand Prix 2005 in Hawaii | Honolulu, Hawaii, USA | KO (right hooks) | 1 | 1:15 | 9–9–1 | 2005 Hawaii Grand Prix semi-final. |
| July 29, 2005 | Win | (United States) Wesley Correira | K-1 World Grand Prix 2005 in Hawaii | Honolulu, Hawaii, USA | TKO (referee stoppage) | 1 | 2:43 | 8–9–1 | 2005 Hawaii Grand Prix quarter-final. |
| April 30, 2005 | Loss | (Brazil) Glaube Feitosa | K-1 World Grand Prix 2005 in Las Vegas | Las Vegas, Nevada, USA | KO (left high kick) | 1 | 2:40 | 7–9–1 | 2005 Las Vegas Grand Prix final. |
| April 30, 2005 | Win | (United States) Scott Lighty | K-1 World Grand Prix 2005 in Las Vegas | Las Vegas, Nevada, USA | TKO (low kicks) | 1 | 2:55 | 7–8–1 | 2005 Las Vegas Grand Prix semi-final. |
| April 30, 2005 | Win | (United States) Sean O'Haire | K-1 World Grand Prix 2005 in Las Vegas | Las Vegas, Nevada, USA | KO (right uppercut) | 1 | 1:56 | 6–8–1 | 2005 Las Vegas Grand Prix quarter-final. |
| December 31, 2004 | Loss | (New Zealand) Ray Sefo | K-1 PREMIUM 2004 Dynamite!! | Osaka, Japan | KO (right uppercuts) | 1 | 0:24 | 5–8–1 | |
| December 4, 2004 | Win | (France) Cyril Abidi | K-1 World Grand Prix 2004 Final | Tokyo, Japan | KO (right hook) | 1 | 3:00 | 5–7–1 | |
| November 6, 2004 | Win | (Italy) Samy Atia | Titans 1st | Kitakyūshū, Japan | KO (punches) | 1 | 2:49 | 4–7–1 | |
| September 25, 2004 | Loss | (United States) Mighty Mo | K-1 World Grand Prix 2004 final elimination | Tokyo, Japan | TKO (three knockdowns) | 1 | 2:58 | 3–7–1 | 2004 K-1 World Grand Prix opening round. |
| August 7, 2004 | Win | (United States) Dewey Cooper | K-1 World Grand Prix 2004 in Las Vegas II | Las Vegas, Nevada, USA | Decision (split) | 3 | 3:00 | 3–6–1 | |
| June 6, 2004 | Loss | (Netherlands) Peter Aerts | K-1 World Grand Prix 2004 in Nagoya | Nagoya, Japan | TKO (low kicks) | 3 | 1:40 | 2–6–1 | |
| April 30, 2004 | Win | (New Zealand) Toa | K-1 World Grand Prix 2004 in Las Vegas I | Las Vegas, Nevada, USA | TKO | 1 | 2:43 | 2–5–1 | |
| May 2, 2003 | Loss | (New Zealand) Mark Hunt | K-1 World Grand Prix 2003 in Las Vegas | Las Vegas, Nevada, USA | Decision (unanimous) | 5 | 3:00 | 1–5–1 | |
| April 6, 2003 | Draw | (Japan) Musashi | K-1 Beast 2003 | Yamagata, Japan | Draw | 5 | 3:00 | 1–4–1 | |
| December 31, 2002 | Loss | (South Africa) Mike Bernardo | Inoki Bom-Ba-Ye 2002 | Saitama, Japan | KO (right hook) | 1 | 2:12 | 1–4 | |
| October 5, 2002 | Loss | (France) Jérôme Le Banner | K-1 World Grand Prix 2002 final elimination | Saitama, Japan | KO (straight right) | 1 | 0:42 | 1–3 | 2002 K-1 World Grand Prix opening round. |
| August 17, 2002 | Win | (South Africa) Mike Bernardo | K-1 World Grand Prix 2002 in Las Vegas | Las Vegas, Nevada, USA | KO (punches) | 1 | 1:38 | 1–2 | |
| August 22, 1999 | Loss | (Japan) Masaaki Satake | K-1 Spirits '99 | Tokyo, Japan | KO (kick) | 3 | 2:47 | 0–2 | |
| April 25, 1999 | Loss | (Japan) Musashi | K-1 Revenge '99 | Yokohama, Japan | DQ | 1 | 2:15 | 0–1 | |
Legend: Win Loss Draw/no contest

== See also ==
- List of male kickboxers
- List of K-1 events
- List of UFC events
- List of Canadian UFC fighters
