= Ultimate Ultimate 1996 =

UFC mixed martial arts event in 1996

- The poster for Ultimate Ultimate 1996
- Promotion: Ultimate Fighting Championship
- Date: December 7, 1996
- Venue: Fair Park Arena
- City: Birmingham, Alabama
- Attendance: 6,000
- Buyrate: 120,000

Event chronology
UFC 11: The Proving Ground	Ultimate Ultimate 1996	UFC 12: Judgement Day

UFC: The Ultimate Ultimate 2 (also known as Ultimate Ultimate 1996, UFC 11.5 or Ultimate Ultimate '96: The Tournament of Champions) was a mixed martial arts event held by the Ultimate Fighting Championship on December 7, 1996. The event took place at the Fair Park Arena in Birmingham, Alabama, and was broadcast live on pay-per-view in the United States, and released on home video.

This was the last event of the UFC to be openweight. From UFC 12 and afterwards, weight categories were introduced.

== History ==
The card featured an eight-man tournament with two alternate bouts, and was the UFC's second "Ultimate Ultimate" tournament, held to find the best of the winners and runners up from past UFC events. This event was the first to introduce the "no grabbing of the fence" rule.

Ken Shamrock appeared as a guest on Late Night with Conan O'Brien on the mainstream network NBC to promote the event, a groundbreaking moment for the young sport of mixed martial arts.

UFC 10 and UFC 11 champion Mark Coleman was originally scheduled to compete in the tournament but was forced to withdraw from the event due to a virus.

The Ultimate Ultimate 1996 also marked the final appearance of UFC Hall of Famer Ken Shamrock before leaving the UFC to go to the World Wrestling Federation. Shamrock would not return to the UFC until 2002 at UFC 40.

The event would also be the last time Don Frye fought in the UFC, as he would also transition into pro wrestling, signing with New Japan Pro-Wrestling. Mark Hall, who Frye defeated in the semifinals, would later claim that Don Frye and manager Robert DePersia came into his dressing room during the tournament and convinced him to throw the two fighters' upcoming semi-final match. Hall says that since Tank Abbott had already advanced to the final after two relatively easy wins, Frye – who'd logged eleven minutes of cage time already that night – wanted to save his energy for the championship match. Because he'd already suffered two defeats to Frye earlier in his career (and therefore probably wasn't going to win anyway) and DePersia implied that saying no would have a disastrous impact on his future, Hall says he reluctantly agreed to go along with the plot. Frye won by Achilles lock submission in twenty seconds. Referee John McCarthy later wrote in his autobiography Let's Get It On!:

"Unfortunately, this night was the second time I felt I was refereeing a fixed bout. In the semifinals, Don Frye and Mark Hall met in a rematch of their UFC 10 bout. In their first encounter Frye had beaten the piss out of Hall, who'd refused to give up. Here, though, Frye ankle-locked Hall to advance to the finals without breaking a sweat. The fight struck me as odd. Frye, a bread-and-butter wrestler and swing-for-the-fences puncher, had never won a fight by leg lock, and Hall practically fell into the submission. I also knew both fighters were managed by the same guy."

== Results ==
Finals
Weight class				Method	Round	Time	Notes
N/A	Don Frye	def.	Tank Abbott	Submission (rear-naked choke)		1:22
Semifinals
N/A	Tank Abbott	def.	Steve Nelmark	KO (punch)		1:03	(Note: Nelmark was an alternate for Ken Shamrock, who could not continue due to an injured hand.)
N/A	Don Frye	def.	Mark Hall	Submission (achilles lock)		0:20	(Note: Hall was an alternate for Kimo Leopoldo, who could not continue due to fatigue. Hall later admitted match fixing was involved in this contest.)
Quarterfinals
N/A	Ken Shamrock	def.	Brian Johnston	Submission (forearm choke)		5:48	(Note: Shamrock was unable to continue in the tournament because of a broken hand he suffered after pinning Johnston up against the cage and unleashing a series of punches.)
N/A	Tank Abbott	def.	Cal Worsham	Submission (punches)		2:51
N/A	Don Frye	def.	Gary Goodridge	Submission (fatigue)		11:19
N/A	Kimo Leopoldo	def.	Paul Varelans	TKO (corner stoppage)		9:08	(Note: Leopoldo was unable to continue in the tournament due to fatigue.)
Alternate bouts
N/A	Mark Hall	def.	Felix Mitchell	TKO (punches)		1:45
N/A	Steve Nelmark	def.	Marcus Bossett	Submission (choke)		1:37
N/A	Tai Bowden	def.	Jack Nilson	Submission (headbutts)		4:46

== Ultimate Ultimate 96 bracket ==
Quarterfinals
(United States) Ken Shamrock	SUB
(United States) Brian Johnston	5:48
(United States) Tank Abbott	SUB
(United States) Cal Worsham	2:51
(United States) Don Frye	SUB
(Trinidad and Tobago) Gary Goodridge	11:19
(United States) Kimo Leopoldo	TKO
(United States) Paul Varelans	9:08

Semifinals
(United States) Steve Nelmark^{1}	KO
(United States) Tank Abbott	1:03
(United States) Don Frye	SUB
(United States) Mark Hall ^{2}	0:20

Finals
(United States) Tank Abbott	1:22
(United States) Don Frye	SUB

^{1}Ken Shamrock withdrew due to injury, and was replaced by alternate Steve Nelmark.

^{2}Kimo Leopoldo withdrew due to fatigue, and was replaced by alternate Mark Hall.

== Encyclopedia awards ==
The following fighters were honored in the October 2011 book titled UFC Encyclopedia.

- Fight of the Night: Don Frye vs. Tank Abbott
- Knockout of the Night: Kimo Leopoldo def. Paul Varelans
- Submission of the Night: Don Frye def. Mark Hall

== See also ==
- Ultimate Fighting Championship
- List of UFC champions
- List of UFC events
- 1996 in UFC
