= Low kick =

Martial arts strike

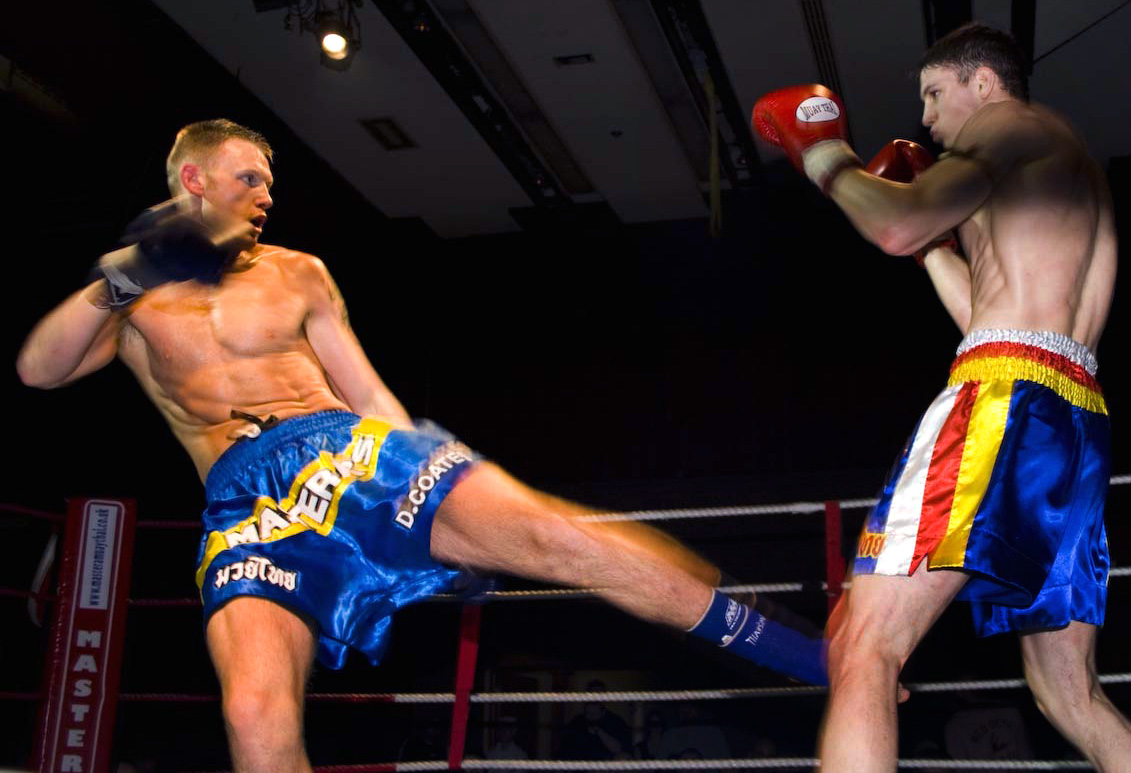
- A Muay Thai fighter kicking with his shin.

A low kick (also known as a leg kick) is a kick in which the attacker strikes the opponent's lower body (thigh or calf) with the shinbone or foot. Under different names, such kicks are utilized in numerous martial arts, including as karate, taekwondo, kūdō, kickboxing, pradal serey, lethwei, Muay Thai, MMA, and various styles of kung fu.

== Damage ==
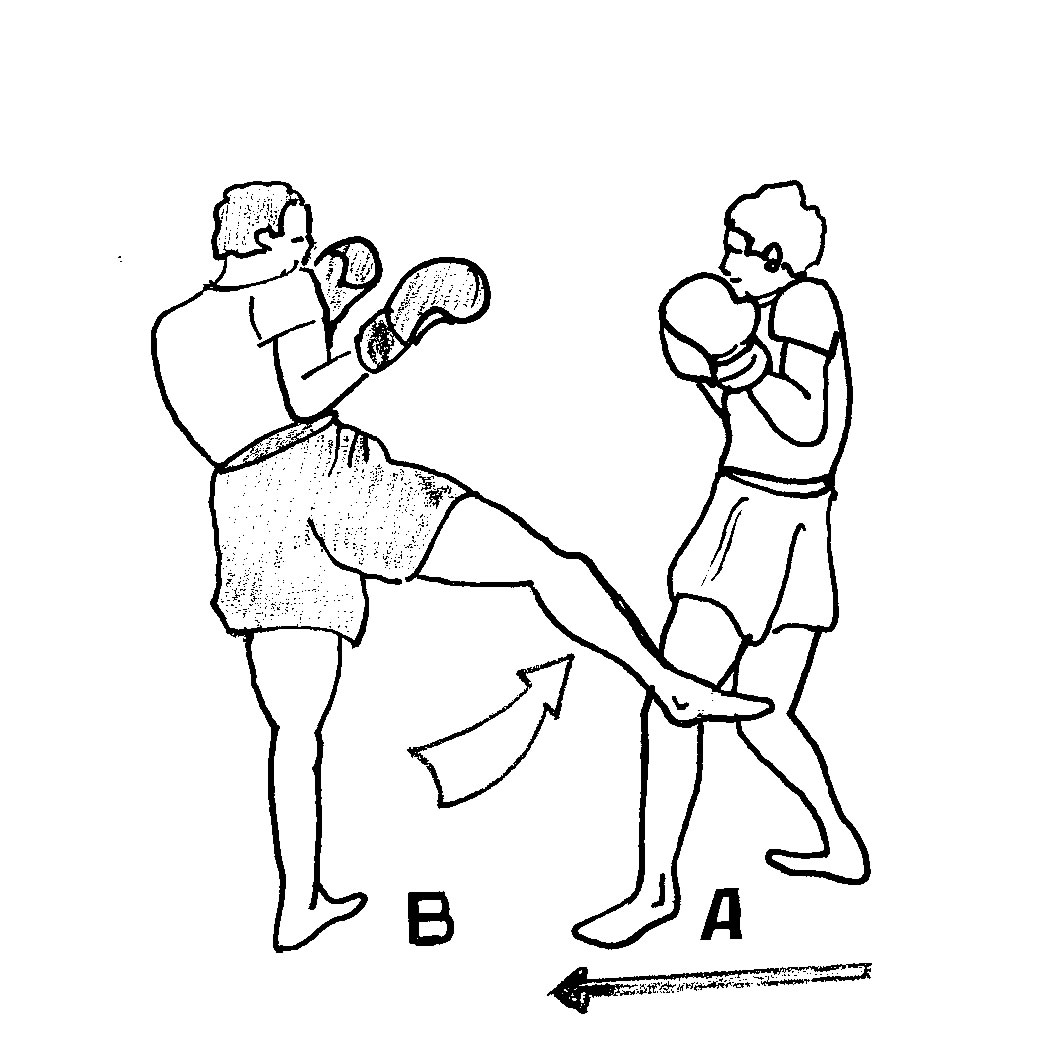
An outside leg kick.

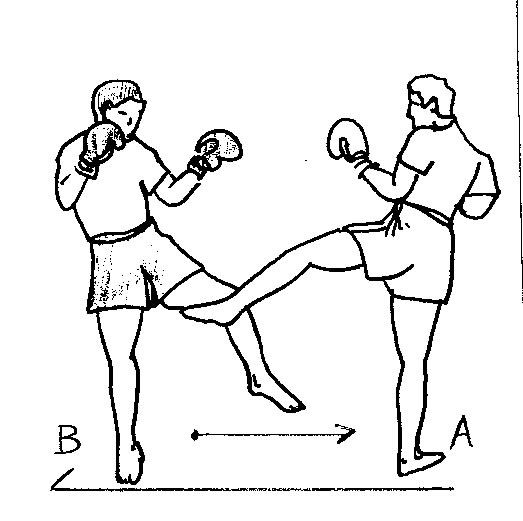
An inside leg kick.

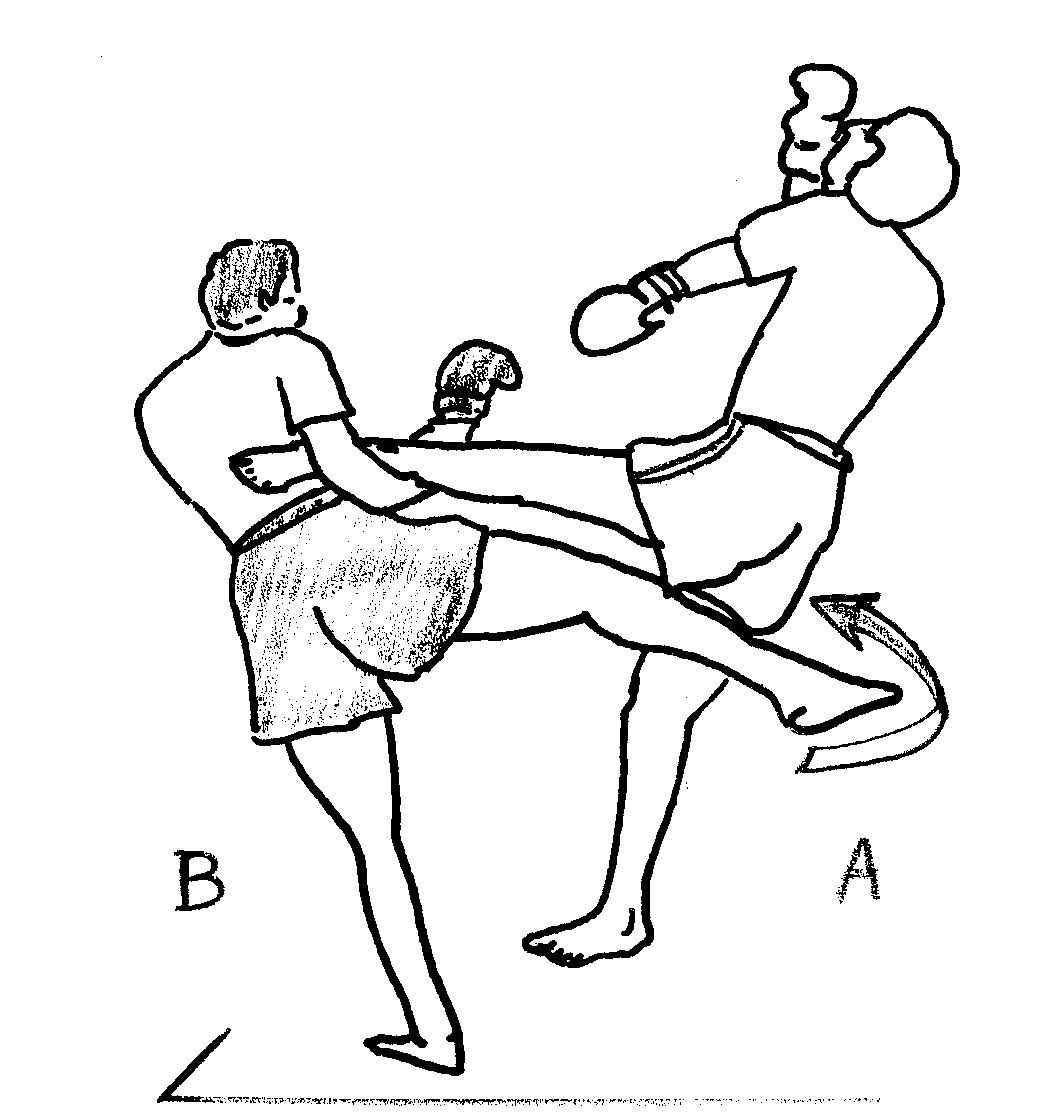
Catching the opponent's leg kick and sweeping their supporting leg.

Low kicks are utilized to damage the opponents legs, which causes the loss of dexterity, stability, and mobility. Being struck repeatedly by low kicks can often result in damage to bones, joints, ligaments and muscle tissue. The sciatic nerve, which is the longest and widest nerve in the human body, beginning in the lower back and running through the buttocks all the way to the lower limb, is a frequent target for low kicks.

A low kick being checked.

== Checking ==
The most common defense against a low kick is known as "checking", where the leg is bent and brought up to protect the thigh. This causes the kicker to slam his/her shin into the defending fighters' shin or knee, causing pain and damage to the offender. In some instances, a well executed check of a low kick can break the leg of the offender — as it was the case when Chris Weidman checked Anderson Silva’s inside low kick in UFC 168, and most recently, when Uriah Hall checked Chris Weidman's inside low kick with the same result at UFC 261

== Use of low kicks in competition ==
Low kicks are prohibited under American kickboxing full contact rules.

However, they are allowed in kickboxing under International rules and Oriental rules as well as in its variants such as muay Thai, sanshou, and shoot boxing. They are also one of the most commonly used weapons in full contact karate styles like Ashihara, Enshin, Kyokushin and Seidokaikan.

Notable examples of fighters using low kicks which affected the outcome of a match:

- Maurice Smith stopped Travis Everett to retain the WKA World Heavyweight Championship in Mexico City, Mexico in 1983.
- Maurice Smith stopped Raymond Horsey to retain the WKA World Heavyweight Championship in Atlanta, Georgia, USA in 1986.
- Maurice Smith stopped Bill Morrison to retain the WKA World Heavyweight Championship in Las Vegas, Nevada, USA in 1987.
- Changpuek Kiatsongrit stopped Rick Roufus in Las Vegas, Nevada, USA on November 5, 1988.
- Maurice Smith stopped Steven Kruwell at the World Martial Arts Challenge (Las Vegas, Nevada, USA) on March 16, 1992.
- Stan Longinidis broke Dennis Alexio's leg to win the ISKA World Heavyweight Oriental Championship at Clash of the Titans (Melbourne, Australia) on December 6, 1992.
- Marco Ruas stopped Paul Varelans at UFC 7 (Buffalo, New York, USA) on September 8, 1995.
- Maurice Smith stopped Tank Abbott at UFC 15 (Bay St. Louis, Mississippi, USA) on October 17, 1997.
- Pedro Rizzo utilized low kicks heavily against Randy Couture but lost by split decision in a UFC Heavyweight Championship match at UFC 31 (Atlantic City, New Jersey, USA) on May 4, 2001.
- Paul Slowinski stopped Faisal Zakaria to win the WMC in Bangkok, Thailand on December 23, 2001.
- Antoni Hardonk stopped Ibragim Magomedov at Bushido Europe: Rotterdam Rumble (Rotterdam, Netherlands) on October 9, 2005.
- Paul Slowinski stopped Abdumalik Gadzhiev at Knees of Fury 12 (Adelaide, Australia) on February 2, 2006.
- Paul Slowinski stopped Peter Graham at the K-1 World Grand Prix 2006 in Auckland (Auckland, New Zealand) on March 5, 2006.
- Daniel Ghiță stopped Muhammad Ali Durmaz at LocalKombat 21 (Bacău, Romania) on June 2, 2006.
- Mirko "Cro Cop" Filipović stopped Hidehiko Yoshida at Pride Critical Countdown Absolute (Saitama, Japan) on July 1, 2006.
- Bas Rutten stopped Ruben Villareal at WFA: King of the Streets (Los Angeles, California, USA) on July 22, 2006.
- Antoni Hardonk stopped Sherman Pendergarst at UFC 65 (Sacramento, California, United States) on November 18, 2006.
- Paul Slowinski stopped Abbas Asaraki at Fury in Macau (Macau, China) on June 2, 2007.
- Daniel Ghiță stopped James Phillips at LocalKombat 27 (Drobeta-Turnu Severin, Romania) on November 3, 2007.
- Paul Slowinski stopped Mighty Mo at the K-1 World Grand Prix 2007 Final (Tokyo, Japan) on December 8, 2007.
- Daniel Ghiță stopped Tadas Rimkevičius at LocalKombat 28 (Braşov, Romania) on December 14, 2007.
- Antoni Hardonk stopped Colin Robinson at UFC 80 (Newcastle, England) on January 19, 2008.
- Forrest Griffin utilized low kicks heavily against Quinton "Rampage" Jackson to win the UFC Light Heavyweight Championship by unanimous decision at UFC 86 (Las Vegas, Nevada, USA) on July 5, 2008.
- Thiago Alves utilized low kicks heavily against Josh Koscheck to win by unanimous decision at UFC 90 (Rosemont, Illinois, USA) on October 25, 2008.
- Pat Barry stopped Dan Evensen at UFC 92 (Las Vegas, Nevada, USA) on December 27, 2008.
- Mirko "Cro Cop" Filipović stopped Choi Hong-man at Dynamite!! 2008 (Saitama, Japan) on December 31, 2008.
- Daniel Ghiță stopped Igor Mihaljević at the K-1 Rules Tournament 2009 in Budapest (Budapest, Hungary) on February 28, 2009.
- Brandon Vera stopped Mike Patt at UFC 96 (Columbus, Ohio, USA) on March 7, 2009.
- Daniel Ghiță stopped Tomáš Hron at It's Showtime 2009 Amsterdam (Amsterdam, Netherlands) on May 16, 2009.
- Daniel Ghiță stopped Yuki Niimura and Sergei Lascenko to win the K-1 World Grand Prix 2009 in Tokyo Final 16 Qualifying GP (Tokyo, Japan) on August 11, 2009.
- Paul Slowinski stopped Ben Edwards at Evolution 18 (Melbourne, Australia) on October 9, 2009.
- Daniel Ghiță stopped Sergei Kharitonov at the K-1 World Grand Prix 2009 Final (Tokyo, Japan) on December 5, 2009.
- José Aldo utilized low kicks heavily against Urijah Faber to retain the WEC Featherweight Championship by unanimous decision at WEC 48 (Sacramento, California, USA) on April 24, 2010.
- Mauricio Rua effectively uses leg kicks in his fights, most notably in his first bout against Lyoto Machida at UFC 104
- Edson Barboza stopped Mike Lullo at UFC 123 (Auburn Hills, Michigan, USA) on November 20, 2010.
- Pat Barry utilized low kicks heavily against Joey Beltran to win by unanimous decision at UFC: Fight For The Troops 2 (Fort Hood, Texas, USA) on January 22, 2011.
- Daniel Ghiță stopped Fikri Ameziane at It's Showtime 2011 Lyon (Lyon, France) on May 14, 2011.
- Paul Slowinski stopped Chris Knowles at Knees of Fury 35 (Adelaide, Australia) on November 26, 2011.
- Paul Slowinski stopped Steve Banks at Knees of Fury 36 (Adelaide, Australia) on February 25, 2012.
- Tarec Saffiedine utilized low kicks heavily against Nate Marquardt to win the Strikeforce Welterweight Championship by unanimous decision at Strikeforce: Marquardt vs. Saffiedine (Oklahoma City, Oklahoma, USA) on January 12, 2013.
