= Brian Johnston (fighter) =

American mixed martial artist and wrestler

- Born: July 28, 1969 (age 57)
- Other names: "Fury"
- Nationality: American
- Height: 6 ft 4 in (1.93 m)
- Weight: 222 lb (101 kg; 15.9 st)
- Style: Boxing, Judo, Kickboxing, Wrestling
- Fighting out of: San Jose, California
- Team: American Kickboxing Academy
- Rank: Black belt in Judo
- Years active: 1996–1997

Mixed martial arts record
- Total: 10
- Wins: 5
- By knockout: 3
- By submission: 2
- Losses: 5
- By knockout: 2
- By submission: 3

Other information
- Mixed martial arts record from Sherdog

Brian Johnston
Personal information
- Born: Brian Johnston; July 28, 1969 (age 57)

Professional wrestling career
- Ring name: Brian Johnston
- Billed height: 6 ft 4 in (1.93 m)
- Billed weight: 246 lb (112 kg)
- Trained by: Brad Rheingans
- Debut: 1997
- Retired: 2001

Brian Johnston (born July 28, 1969) is an American former mixed martial artist and professional wrestler who competed throughout the mid-1990s, most notably in the Ultimate Fighting Championship and New Japan Pro-Wrestling. Johnston retired after suffering a massive stroke in 2001.

== Career ==
=== Ultimate Fighting Championship ===
Johnston holds a black belt in judo and was a former Golden Gloves amateur boxing champion with an undefeated amateur kickboxing record of 12-0, as well as an experienced amateur wrestler. His effective mix of precision striking and ground fighting, as seen with other fighters such as Erik Paulson, Matt Hume, and Marco Ruas, would set the standard for what are now common traits in modern-day fighting styles. Johnston fought many notable fighters in their prime, such as Don Frye, Mark Coleman and Ken Shamrock, while competing in the UFC.

=== Professional wrestling ===
Initially trained by Brad Rheingans, Johnston made his professional wrestling debut in 1997, losing to Naoya Ogawa at NJPW G1 Climax Special 1997. Throughout his whole career Johnston was used as a tag team wrestler, teaming with such names like Don Frye, Osamu Kido, Tadao Yasuda, Dave Beneteau, and Kazuyuki Fujita. He had a notable appearance at the 1999 G1 Tag League, teaming with Takashi Iizuka.

=== Retirement ===
In August 2001, Johnston suffered a massive stroke while in Japan prior to a fight, at 32 years of age and 3 weeks after his wedding. He was subsequently forced to retire. Johnston would train several team mates to impressive MMA victories, over notables such as Mark Kerr, K-1 fighter Jan Nortje and MMA fighters Ryan Gracie and Ken Shamrock.

== Career accomplishments ==
=== Mixed martial arts ===
- Ultimate Fighting Championship
  - UFC Encyclopedia Awards
    - Knockout of the Night (One time) vs. Reza Nasri

== Mixed martial arts record ==
Professional record breakdown
10 matches	5 wins	5 losses
By knockout	3	2
By submission	2	3
By decision	0	0

Res.	Record	Opponent	Method	Event	Date	Round	Time	Location	Notes
Loss	5–5	Dan Bobish	Submission(forearm choke)	UFC 14	July 27, 1997	1	2:10	Birmingham, Alabama, United States	
Win	5–4	John Renfroe	Submission (choke)	Strikeforce - Strike Force	May 31, 1997	1	2:10	San Jose, California, United States	
Loss	4–4	Kimo Leopoldo	Submission (forearm choke)	Ultimate Explosion	April 16, 1997	1	1:43	Honolulu, Hawaii, United States	
Win	4–3	Dennis Reed	Submission (rear-naked choke)	Extreme Challenge 3	February 15, 1997	1	0:48	Davenport, Iowa, United States	
Win	3–3	Egidio Amaro da Costa	TKO (submission to punches and headbutts)	Universal Vale Tudo Fighting 5	January 30, 1997	1	1:34	Brazil	
Loss	2–3	Ken Shamrock	Submission (forearm choke)	Ultimate Ultimate 1996	December 7, 1996	1	5:48	Birmingham, Alabama, United States	
Loss	2–2	Mark Coleman	TKO (submission to punches)	UFC 11	August 20, 1996	1	2:20	Augusta, Georgia, United States	
Win	2–1	Reza Nasri	TKO (punches)	UFC 11	August 20, 1996	1	0:28	Augusta, Georgia, United States	
Loss	1–1	Don Frye	TKO (submission to elbow)	UFC 10	July 12, 1996	1	4:37	Birmingham, Alabama, United States	
Win	1–0	Scott Fiedler	TKO (submission to punches)	UFC 10	July 12, 1996	1	2:25	Birmingham, Alabama, United States	
