= Steve Nelmark =

American mixed martial arts fighters

- Born: United States
- Other names: The Sandman
- Height: 6 ft 0 in (1.83 m)
- Weight: 250 lb (110 kg; 18 st)
- Division: Heavyweight
- Years active: 1996 (MMA)

Mixed martial arts record
- Total: 3
- Wins: 2
- By knockout: 1
- By submission: 1
- Losses: 1
- By knockout: 1

Other information
- Mixed martial arts record from Sherdog

Steve Nelmark is an American former mixed martial artist. He competed in the Heavyweight division.

== Nelmarking ==
Nelmark is perhaps most well known for his spectacular knockout loss to David Abbott. In it, he was crumpled underneath the cage, his legs bent under him, prompting audience members to shout "he dead." Since then, the act of getting knocked out in a similar spectacular fashion (with the key components being the legs tucked underneath, and the slump over the cage), has been called Nelmarking. Well known UFC fighters that have Nelmarked are "Croatian Special Police member" Mirko Cro Cop in his humiliating loss against Gabriel Gonzaga where his right leg was twisted underneath himself, Rashad Evans in his loss to Lyoto Machida that became a meme because of the face of Evans while unconscious, Thomas Almeida's knockout of Anthony Birchak and recently Jimi Manuwa's nelmarking of Ovince St. Preux at UFC 204. At UFC on Fox 28, Alan Jouban's knockout of Ben Saunders was noted as a fenceless Nelmarking.

== Mixed martial arts record ==
Professional record breakdown
3 matches	2 wins	1 loss
By knockout	1	1
By submission	1	0

Res.	Record	Opponent	Method	Event	Date	Round	Time	Location	Notes
Loss	2–1	David Abbott	KO (punch)	UFC: Ultimate Ultimate 1996	December 7, 1996	1	1:03	Birmingham, Alabama, United States	
Win	2–0	Marcus Bossett	Submission (choke)	UFC: Ultimate Ultimate 1996	December 7, 1996	1	1:37	Birmingham, Alabama, United States	
Win	1–0	Tai Bowden	TKO (doctor stoppage)	UFC 9: Motor City Madness	May 17, 1996	1	7:25	Detroit, Michigan, United States	

== See also ==
- List of male mixed martial artists
