= UFC 14 =

UFC mixed martial arts event in 1997

UFC 14: Showdown
- The poster for UFC 14: Showdown
- Promotion: Ultimate Fighting Championship
- Date: July 27, 1997
- Venue: Boutwell Auditorium
- City: Birmingham, Alabama
- Attendance: 5,000

Event chronology
UFC 13: Ultimate Force	UFC 14: Showdown	UFC 15: Collision Course

UFC 14: Showdown was a mixed martial arts event held by the Ultimate Fighting Championship on July 27, 1997 in Birmingham, Alabama. The event was seen live on pay-per-view in the United States, and later released on home video.

== History ==
UFC 14 featured two separate tournaments: a heavyweight tournament for fighters 200 lb or more, and a middleweight (formerly lightweight) tournament for fighters under 200 lb. The event also featured a UFC Heavyweight Championship "Superfight" between Mark Coleman and Maurice Smith, as well as two alternate bouts in case of tournament injury.

Showdown was the first UFC event to require all fighters to wear padded gloves, weighing between four and six ounces. Up until then, it was the fighter's option - Melton Bowen was the first UFC fighter to choose to wear UFC gloves, back in UFC 4. It was also the first UFC appearance of World champion kickboxer Maurice Smith and champion collegiate wrestler Mark Kerr, who was encouraged to try mixed martial arts competition by his friend and training partner, Mark Coleman.

== Results ==
Heavyweight Championship
Weight class				Method	Round	Time	Notes
Heavyweight	Maurice Smith	def.	Mark Coleman (c)	Decision (unanimous)		21:00	(Note: For the UFC Heavyweight Championship.)
Middleweight Finals
Weight class				Method	Round	Time	Notes
Middleweight	Kevin Jackson	def.	Tony Fryklund	Submission (rear-naked choke)		0:44	(Note: Fryklund replaced Moreira, who was not medically permitted to continue.)
Middleweight Semifinals
Middleweight	Joe Moreira	def.	Yuri Vaulin	Decision (unanimous)		15:00	(Note: Moreira was not allowed to continue in the tournament, due to failing his post-fight medical exam (concussion).)
Middleweight	Kevin Jackson	def.	Todd Butler	Submission (punches)		1:27
Middleweight Alternate bout
Middleweight	Tony Fryklund	def.	Donnie Chappell	Submission (choke)		1:31	(Note: After the stoppage, Fyrklund hit Chappell with a late blow and stepped on him while walking away, prompting a severe reprimand by both cageside referees. Fryklund later apologized for his behavior.)
Heavyweight Finals
Weight class				Method	Round	Time	Notes
Heavyweight	Mark Kerr	def.	Dan Bobish	Submission (chin to the eye)		1:38
Heavyweight Semifinals
Heavyweight	Mark Kerr	def.	Moti Horenstein	TKO (punches)		2:22
Heavyweight	Dan Bobish	def.	Brian Johnston	Submission (forearm choke)		2:10
Heavyweight Alternate bout
Heavyweight	Alex Hunter	def.	Sam Fulton	TKO (punches)		2:22

== UFC 14 Middleweight tournament bracket ==
Semifinals
(Brazil) Joe Moreira	DEC
(Latvia) Yuri Vaulin	15:00
(United States) Kevin Jackson	SUB
(United States) Todd Butler	1:27

Finals
(United States) Tony Fryklund^{1}	0:44
(United States) Kevin Jackson	SUB

^{1} Tony Fryklund replaced Joe Moreira who was not medically permitted to continue.

== UFC 14 Heavyweight Tournament Bracket ==
Semifinals
(United States) Mark Kerr	TKO
(Israel) Moti Horenstein	2:22
(United States) Dan Bobish	TKO
(United States) Brian Johnston	2:10

Finals
(United States) Mark Kerr	SUB
(United States) Dan Bobish	1:38

== Encyclopedia awards ==
The following fighters were honored in the October 2011 book titled UFC Encyclopedia.

- Fight of the Night: Maurice Smith vs. Mark Coleman
- Knockout of the Night: Mark Kerr def. Moti Horenstein
- Submission of the Night: Kevin Jackson def. Tony Fryklund

== See also ==
- Ultimate Fighting Championship
- List of UFC champions
- List of UFC events
- 1997 in UFC
