= UFC 10 =

UFC mixed martial arts event in 1996

UFC 10: The Tournament
- The poster for UFC 10: The Tournament
- Promotion: Ultimate Fighting Championship
- Date: July 12, 1996
- Venue: Fair Park Arena
- City: Birmingham, Alabama
- Attendance: 4,300
- Buyrate: 96,000

Event chronology
UFC 9: Motor City Madness	UFC 10: The Tournament	UFC 11: The Proving Ground

UFC 10: The Tournament was a mixed martial arts event held by the Ultimate Fighting Championship (UFC) on July 12, 1996, at the Fair Park Arena in Birmingham, Alabama. The event was seen live on pay per view in the United States, and later released on home video. A fictional UFC 10, staged at the Grand Olympic Auditorium, is featured during one scene in the film Virtuosity, including an appearance from fighter Ken Shamrock.

== History ==
UFC 10 marked the UFC's return to the tournament format (which was removed in favor of single bouts at UFC 9). The card featured an eight man tournament, as well as two alternate bouts in case of an injury, and to fill time for the pay-per-view broadcast.

UFC was originally supposed to air this event from the Providence Civic Center in Providence, Rhode Island. The Rhode Island Department of Business Regulation (DBR) challenged the UFC's licence to host the event in court. Judge Richard J. Israel agreed that the tournament could go ahead there but only if they followed the rules of professional wrestling. When the UFC's lawyer stated that the WWF wasn't real, the judge retorted: "I’ve been watching it for 20 years, it certainly is." Due to wrestling needing a licence in Rhode Island, the UFC were obliged to apply for a wrestling licence from the DBR, which they refused to grant and the refusal was upheld on appeal. As a result, this led to UFC 10 being forced to move the event to Alabama.

UFC 10 featured the first appearance of Mark Coleman, who beat fan favorite Don Frye to win the tournament. It was also the first time that Bruce Buffer announced the fights inside the Octagon, replacing Rich Goins. (Bruce's brother Michael Buffer had announced at UFC 6 and UFC 7.) However, Rich Goins came back for UFC 8, UFC 9, and UFC 11.

== Results ==
Finals
Weight class				Method	Round	Time	Notes
N/A	Mark Coleman	def.	Don Frye	TKO (punches)		11:34
Semifinals
N/A	Don Frye	def.	Brian Johnston	TKO (submission to elbow)		4:37
N/A	Mark Coleman	def.	Gary Goodridge	Submission (exhaustion)		7:00
Quarterfinals
N/A	Don Frye	def.	Mark Hall	TKO (punches)		10:21
N/A	Brian Johnston	def.	Scott Fiedler	TKO (submission to punches)		2:25
N/A	Mark Coleman	def.	Moti Horenstein	TKO (submission to punches)		2:43
N/A	Gary Goodridge	def.	John Campetella	TKO (punches)		1:28
Alternate bouts
N/A	Geza Kalman	def.	Dieuseul Berto	TKO (punches)		5:57
N/A	Sam Adkins	def.	Felix Mitchell	Decision (unanimous)

== UFC 10 bracket ==
Quarterfinals
(United States) Don Frye	TKO
(United States) Mark Hall	10:21
(United States) Brian Johnston	TKO
(United States) Scott Fiedler	2:25
(United States) Mark Coleman	SUB
(Israel) Moti Horenstein	2:43
(Trinidad and Tobago) Gary Goodridge	KO
(United States) John Campetella	1:28

Semifinals
(United States) Don Frye	TKO
(United States) Brian Johnston	4:37
(United States) Mark Coleman	SUB
(Trinidad and Tobago) Gary Goodridge	7:00

Finals
(United States) Don Frye	11:34
(United States) Mark Coleman	TKO

== Encyclopedia awards ==
The following fighters were honored in the October 2011 book titled UFC Encyclopedia.

- Fight of the Night: Mark Coleman vs. Don Frye
- Knockout of the Night: Mark Coleman def. Moti Horenstein

== See also ==
- Ultimate Fighting Championship
- List of UFC champions
- List of UFC events
- 1996 in UFC
