= Mark Hall (fighter) =

American mixed martial arts fighter

- Born: March 3, 1961 (age 65); Detroit, Michigan, United States
- Other names: The Cobra
- Nationality: American
- Height: 6 ft 0 in (1.83 m)
- Weight: 190 lb (86 kg; 14 st)
- Division: Light heavyweight
- Style: Moo Yea Do, Kickboxing, Aikido, Brazilian Jiu-Jitsu, Karate, Taekwondo, Boxing, Wrestling, Shootfighting
- Rank: 4th Degree Black Belt in Moo Yea Do; Black Belt in Taekwondo; Black Belt in American Karate; Purple Belt in Brazilian Jiu-Jitsu
- Years active: 1995 - 2001

Mixed martial arts record
- Total: 11
- Wins: 5
- By knockout: 4
- By submission: 1
- Losses: 6
- By knockout: 3
- By submission: 3

Other information
- Mixed martial arts record from Sherdog

Mark Hall is an American retired mixed martial artist and Amateur Kickboxer who competed in the Light heavyweight division. Hall is most famous for his 42 second stoppage of the 390lb Sumo World Champion, Koji Kitao at UFC 9. Hall is also known for his bouts against Don Frye at UFC: Ultimate Ultimate 1996, THE U-JAPAN Super Fighting Vol.1, and UFC 10.

== Championships and Accomplishments ==
- International Vale Tudo Championship
  - IVC 2 Tournament Semifinalist
- Ultimate Fighting Championship
  - UFC 7 Tournament Semifinalist
  - UFC Ultimate Ultimate 1996 Tournament Semifinalist
- Founder of Cobra Fighting Federation
- In 1998, Mark hosted the very first legal MMA event in California, at the Stampede in Temecula, CA
- Hosted the very first MMA event held on Indian Reservation in the state of California. One week before Terry launched King of the Cage

== Mixed martial arts record ==
Professional record breakdown
11 matches	5 wins	6 losses
By knockout	4	3
By submission	1	3

Res.	Record	Opponent	Method	Event	Date	Round	Time	Location	Notes
Loss	5–6	John Cole	TKO (punches)	CFF: Cobra Classic 2001	October 6, 2001	2	2:15	Anza, California, United States	
Loss	5–5	Artur Mariano	TKO (punches)	IVC 2: A Question of Pride	September 15, 1997	1	8:26	Brazil	IVC 2 Tournament Semifinals.
Win	5–4	Luiz Fraga	TKO (submission to punches)	IVC 2: A Question of Pride	September 15, 1997	1	9:19	Brazil	IVC 2 Tournament First Round.
Loss	4–4	Don Frye	Submission (achilles lock)	UFC: Ultimate Ultimate 1996	December 7, 1996	1	0:20	Birmingham, Alabama, United States	Ultimate Ultimate 1996 Semifinals.
Win	4–3	Felix Mitchell	TKO (punches)	UFC: Ultimate Ultimate 1996	December 7, 1996	1	1:45	Birmingham, Alabama, United States	Ultimate Ultimate 1996 Alternate Bout.
Loss	3–3	Don Frye	Submission (forearm choke)	U-Japan	November 17, 1996	1	5:29	Japan	
Loss	3–2	Don Frye	TKO (punches)	UFC 10: The Tournament	July 12, 1996	1	10:21	Birmingham, Alabama, United States	
Win	3–1	Koji Kitao	TKO (doctor stoppage)	UFC 9: Motor City Madness	May 17, 1996	1	0:40	Detroit, Michigan, United States	
Win	2–1	Trent Jenkins	Submission (armlock)	UFC: Ultimate Ultimate 1995	December 16, 1995	1	5:29	Denver, Colorado, United States	Ultimate Ultimate 1995 Alternate Bout.
Loss	1–1	Paul Varelans	Submission (americana)	UFC 7: The Brawl in Buffalo	September 8, 1995	1	1:04	Buffalo, New York, United States	UFC 7 Tournament Semifinals.
Win	1–0	Harold Howard	TKO (submission to punches)	UFC 7: The Brawl in Buffalo	September 8, 1995	1	1:41	Buffalo, New York, United States	UFC 7 Tournament First Round.

== See also ==
- List of male mixed martial artists
