= Marco Ruas =

Brazilian mixed martial artist

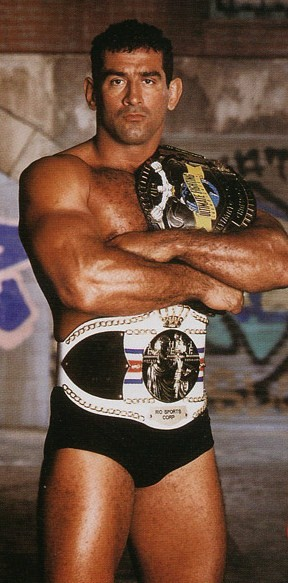
- Born: 23 January 1961 (age 65); Rio de Janeiro, Brazil
- Other names: The King of the Streets
- Height: 1.85 m (6 ft 1 in)
- Weight: 95.2 kg (210 lb; 15 st 0 lb)
- Style: Luta Livre Esportiva, Brazilian Jiu-Jitsu, Judo, Muay Thai, Taekwondo, Capoeira, Boxing, Wrestling, Vale Tudo
- Fighting out of: Rio de Janeiro, Brazil
- Team: Ruas Vale Tudo
- Rank: 9th dan red belt in Luta Livre Esportiva; 3rd dan black belt in Brazilian Jiu-Jitsu; 3rd dan black belt in Judo; 1st dan black belt in Taekwondo; Black cord in Capoeira; Black prajiad in Muay Thai
- Years active: 1984–2001, 2007

Mixed martial arts record
- Total: 15
- Wins: 9
- By knockout: 2
- By submission: 7
- Losses: 4
- By knockout: 3
- By decision: 1
- Draws: 2

Other information
- Mixed martial arts record from Sherdog

Marco Antônio de Lima Ruas (Portuguese pronunciation: [ˈmaʁku ˈʁuɐs]; born 23 January 1961) is a Brazilian former mixed martial arts fighter, submission wrestler, kickboxer and instructor. Ruas was the UFC 7 Tournament Champion, and also competed for the World Vale Tudo Championship (WVC), PRIDE Fighting Championships and the International Fight League, where he head-coached the Southern California Condors.

Ruas competed in Vale Tudo, with his first bout in 1984 and won the UFC 7 tournament in 1995, becoming the second Brazilian UFC champion. His fighting style combined Luta Livre submission grappling with Muay Thai, capoeira, boxing and taekwondo. Ruas transformed his style in his own hybrid martial art which he called "Ruas Vale Tudo". In some later events, his fighting style was simply billed as "Vale Tudo". He is recognized as a pioneer of mixed martial arts and one of the first well-rounded fighters in the sport, integrating striking and grappling techniques and advocating cross-training between different martial arts.

== Background ==
Ruas was born in Rio de Janeiro, Brazil in 1961. He started his career training Boxing, Taekwondo, Judo, and Capoeira, the latter with renowned José Tadeu Carneiro Cardoso in Rio de Janeiro at the Santa Luzia club, downtown Rio. However, his primary martial arts eventually became Luta Livre, which he trained under Roberto Leitão Sr., and Muay Thai, which he trained under Luiz Alves, a student of Nélio "Naja" Borges, the man who introduced Thai boxing to Brazil.

== Mixed martial arts career ==
=== Early Vale Tudo ===
As a black belt in Luta Livre, who faced up a legendary quarrel against the Brazilian Jiu-Jitsu fighters in the 1980s and 1990s. In 1984, he participated of the Noite das Artes Marciais ("Night of the Martial Arts") event, fought by representatives of BJJ against representatives of Muay Thai, Kung Fu, Kickboxing and Luta Livre. Ruas represented Muay Thai fighting a match against BJJ representative Fernando Pinduka, he used his Luta Livre skills to counter Pinduka's grappling and the match went to draw. After the match against Pinduka, he started training in Brazilian jiu-jitsu with Osvaldo Alves. Later he trained Joe Moreira before his fight against the Russian boxer Yuri Vaulin. Seeing his good skills in grappling, Moreira gave him a black belt in Brazilian jiu-jitsu and caused a commotion and controversy among his fellow Brazilians, due the rivalry between the two martial arts. His instructors included Euclydes Hatem.

Eventually, Ruas became famous among the Brazilian martial arts circle and one of the most regarded non-BJJ fighters in Brazil due his philosophy of Cross-Training and in synthesizing all martial arts he knew for both Vale Tudo contests and self-defense into a new hybrid martial art he dubbed "Ruas Vale Tudo". However, this philosophy also caused controversy among Brazilian fighters and he was labelled as a Creonte by not only BJJ but also by Luta Livre fighters.

In 1991 he was going to participate in Desafio - Jiu Jitsu vs Luta Livre, an event fought as a challenge between fighters from the two martial arts, Ruas was cast to fight BJJ representative Amaury Bitetti but cancelled his participation and Bitetti was declared winner by W.O. Instead, in 1992 he fought in Manaus in a Vale Tudo event where he defeated Francisco Borges with a rear naked choke. Eventually he attracted the attention of Brazilian manager and fight promoter Frederico Lapenda and was able to get the 34-year-old fighter into the Ultimate Fighting Championship.

=== Ultimate Fighting Championship ===
Ruas debuted in the Ultimate Fighting Championship at the UFC 7 event in 1995. At the event, he was billed representing "Vale Tudo". He firstly faced Larry Cureton, who outweighed him by 40 lbs, but Ruas submitted him with a heel hook after a methodical grapple. His next opponent was the judoka Remco Pardoel, who early tried a guillotine choke, but Ruas blocked it and grinded him with foot stomps. After a failed heel hook attempt, Ruas controlled Pardoel and attacked him with knees and punches on the ground, making him tap out. Ruas's final fight was against 6'8", 330 lb Paul Varelans, and he showed his muay thai skills by overwhelming Varelans with punch combos and repeated leg kicks. He also used again his characteristic foot stomps when Paul clinched him against the cage. At the end, Varelans could not take more kicks to his legs and fell to the ground, where Ruas pounded him until the referee stopped the fight, giving Ruas the victory of the tournament.

Thanks to his victory in UFC 7, Ruas was invited to the Ultimate Ultimate tournament, an event featuring former tournament winners and notable fighters from previous UFC events. He defeated Keith Hackney by choke with ease, but his next opponente, Oleg Taktarov, made a tougher contest. Both fighters used a passive approach to the fight, with Ruas blocking Taktarov's takedown attempts and seizing all the opportunities to strike him, actually making him bleed profusely. However, the judges gave the decision win to Taktarov, and Ruas was eliminated from the tournament. This decision was met with controversy, and Ruas and his cornermen appealed to the referee, but nothing came from it.

=== World Vale Tudo Championship ===
In 1996 he joined the nascent World Vale Tudo Championship (WVC) organized by his manager Frederico Lapenda, fighting in the superfight against UFC 3 Tournament Champion Steve Jennum in Tokyo, Japan. He won easily with a submission to punches and won the WVC Superfight belt.

Almost a year after his last UFC fight in November 1996, he faced Taktarov again in WVC 2 in Brazil, in a bout with no judges. The rematch ended in a draw after 31 minutes, but Ruas was clearly the most dominating fighter, and he shook hands with Oleg after the fight. He kept the WVC Superfight belt in the process. He finished his run in the organization with his last superfight against UFC 2 finalist Patrick Smith in the WVC 4 event, easily winning with a heel hook.

Ruas briefly joined the stable of Antônio "Sebastião" Lacerda, a wealthy man from the north of Brazil and self-proclaimed "Master of Death" who appeared in Rio de Janeiro in 1996 claiming to have spent a long period of time in Japan learning "the deadly art of Yawara." Despite his dubious credentials, Lacerda was able to recruit some established competitors into his sect, including Ruas and Edson Carvalho, a judo national team member and a Carlson Gracie black belt. Seeking opportunities to compete professionally, Ruas began training with Lacerda after Lacerda promised to take him to lucrative competitions abroad, on the condition that he agree to merge his style of vale tudo with Lacerda's techniques. Ruas parted ways with Lacerda when he began to question the effectiveness of Lacerda's techniques and practices, but Carvalho continued participating in Lacerda's challenge, constantly attacking not only jiu-jitsu but all fighting styles.

=== PRIDE Fighting Championships and transition to coaching ===
He was then invited to PRIDE Fighting Championships in 1998, he first had a match against UFC veteran Gary Goodridge at PRIDE 2, winning with a heel hook after a 9-minute bout. At PRIDE 4 he fought Japanese shoot wrestler Alexander Otsuka. In a major upset, Otsuka fought with tenacity, taking Ruas down and performing ground-and-pound, defending a fully locked rear naked choke and forcing a TKO by medical stoppage in the second round. It was later revealed that Ruas fought under medication for Hepatitis and a knee injury. He returned briefly to UFC to fight former heavyweight champion Maurice Smith in UFC 21, but lost by TKO. Ruas suffered an injury in the first round and could not continue.

Around that time, Ruas started to transition from a fighter into a full-time coach, teaching his own "Ruas Vale Tudo" style for a new generation of fighters. Some of his students include UFC light-heavyweight contender Pedro Rizzo and Strikeforce light-heavyweight champion Renato Sobral. He also coached UFC Featherweight Champion José Aldo in Luta Livre, awarding him a black belt in the art, and Aldo was also coached striking and leg kicks by Pedro Rizzo, some of Ruas's own fighting style can be seen in Aldo's.

At this point semi-retired, in 2001 Ruas defeated Jason Lambert at Ultimate Pankration in California in less than 1 minute with a heel hook.

Marco Ruas was invited to participate in the newly formed MMA promotion International Fight League (IFL). This promotion would be divided into different teams (later becoming simply MMA camps) instead of one-on-one affairs, and at the end one of the seasons one of the teams/camps was crowned champion. Ruas coached the "Southern California Condors" team, later simply known as "Ruas Vale Tudo". He also came out from retirement and had one rematch against Maurice Smith (which coached the IFL's "Seattle Tiger Sharks") as the superfight for the IFL: Chigaco event in 2007, which he lost by TKO with a stoppage by his corner. Marco Ruas then fully retired from the sport with a record of 9 wins, 4 losses and 2 draws.

== Fighting Style ==
Ruas developed a well-rounded fighting style that combined Luta Livre and Brazilian jiu-jitsu submission grappling with Muay Thai, boxing, taekwondo and capoeira for striking. He emphasized cross-training and the integration of different martial arts rather than relying on a single discipline, developing his own hybrid system known as "Ruas Vale Tudo". He was proficient in striking, takedowns and submission grappling, and adjusted his tactics according to his opponent's strengths, allowing him to transition between striking and grappling as necessary, a philosophy he summarized with the phrase, "If you grapple, I punch and kick. If you punch and kick, I grapple. There’s no way out." While commonplace in modern mixed martial arts, the integration of multiple martial arts was less common during Ruas' early career, when Vale Tudo and MMA was largely characterized by contests between specialists in individual disciplines. His emphasis on cross-training and developing proficiency in both striking and grappling made him an early example of the well-rounded fighter who would become standard in MMA.

Ruas' approach was characterized by adaptability and the ability to fight effectively across different ranges. During the UFC 7 tournament, he demonstrated this versatility by submitting Larry Cureton with a heel hook, using ground-and-pound against Remco Pardoel, and employing low kicks and foot stomps extensively against Paul Varelans. These performances demonstrated his ability to combine striking, takedowns and submission grappling within the same fighting system, rather than treating them as separate disciplines. UFC co-founder Campbell McLaren later described Ruas' UFC 7 performance as marking "the birth of MMA", while Ruas said he sought to demonstrate that a fighter needed to "know a little of everything".

== Personal life ==
Ruas is married and has three daughters. Marco's first recorded fight was in 1984. Marco's nickname is "The King of the Streets" (Ruas actually means "streets" in Portuguese). Marco lives in Laguna Niguel, California where he operates his own MMA gym "Ruas Vale Tudo".

In 2023, he was awarded a rare red belt in Luta Livre for achieving 9th dan black belt and for his contributions for the martial art.

=== Feud with Rickson Gracie ===
Ruas developed a feud with Rickson Gracie, both were of the most skilled and high-profile grapplers of their time, and represent two rival styles that were feuding at the time: Luta Livre and Gracie Jiu-Jitsu. The rivalry started in 1988 when promoters tried to match both fighters to a Vale Tudo match. However, Hélio Gracie refused, demanding either that Rickson received a higher payment or that the bout happened inside the Gracie Academy, which were both rejected, so the fight didn't take place. Gracie claims that he then went to Ruas's academy to challenge him. Ruas accepted it but requested four months to train instead of fighting right away in the gym, Gracie denied it since he would leave Brazil to the United States before that. Ruas however, denies this version, saying that he was ready for a fight, but actually Gracie wanted to fight "Luta Livre guys" and Hélio Gracie who was accompanying Rickson said Ruas wasn't a "real Luta Livre fighter" due his open advocacy of cross-training. A few of Ruas's teammates also joined in and the discussion got heated up and Hélio said "Maybe we should make a list of people who want to fight Rickson", one of the fighters who accepted the challenge was Hugo Duarte, who would have his own scraps with Gracie.

A few years later, both Rickson Gracie and Marco Ruas would gain international fame, Rickson Gracie became winner of the Vale Tudo Japan tournaments in '94 and '95, and headlined Pride 1 and Pride 4, while Ruas became UFC 7 and WVC champion. Rickson became a big celebrity in Japan and in the burgeoning international MMA scene. He became controversial for criticizing other top fighters and said in interviews that Marco Ruas as "nothing special" and "basic". Ruas responded by saying "Talk is cheap. He has to step up in the ring and prove what he says." and issued multiple challenges against Gracie along the years, claiming he was avoiding him as well as other actually skilled fighters. In the end however, no fight was ever materialized between them.

== In popular culture ==
Ruas made a cameo appearance as a jealous husband in Kickboxer 3, in which his character fought and lost to Sasha Mitchell's David Sloane at a party.

== Instructor lineage ==
=== Luta Livre ===
Roberto Leitão Sr. → Marco Ruas

=== Brazilian Jiu-Jitsu ===
Mitsuyo Maeda → Carlos Gracie → Helio Gracie → Francisco Mansur → Joe Moreira → Marco Ruas

Mitsuyo Maeda → Carlos Gracie → Reyson Gracie → Osvaldo Alves → Marco Ruas

=== Judo ===
Jigoro Kano → Soshihiro Satake → Vinícius Ruas → Marco Ruas

=== Capoeira ===
Manuel dos Reis Machado → José Tadeu Carneiro Cardoso → Marco Ruas

=== Muay Thai ===
Nelio Naja → Luiz Alves → Marco Ruas

=== Taekwondo ===
Won Jae Lee → Marco Ruas

== Championships and accomplishments ==
- Ultimate Fighting Championship
  - UFC 7 Tournament Champion
  - Ultimate Ultimate 1995 Semi-Finalist
  - UFC Viewers Choice Award
  - UFC Encyclopedia Awards
    - Fight of the Night (One time) vs. Paul Varelans
    - Submission of the Night (One time) vs. Larry Cureton
- World Vale Tudo Championship
  - WVC Superfight Championship (one time)
- Rio Boxing Tournament
  - Boxing Champion (one time)

== Mixed martial arts record ==
Professional record breakdown
15 matches	9 wins	4 losses
By knockout	2	3
By submission	7	0
By decision	0	1
Draws	2	

Res.	Record	Opponent	Method	Event	Date	Round	Time	Location	Notes
Loss	9–4–2	Maurice Smith	TKO (corner stoppage)	IFL: Chicago	19 May 2007	4	3:43	Chicago, Illinois, United States	
Win	9–3–2	Jason Lambert	Submission (heel hook)	Ultimate Pankration 1	11 November 2001	1	0:56	Cabazon, California, United States	
Loss	8–3–2	Maurice Smith	TKO (corner stoppage)	UFC 21	16 July 1999	1	5:00	Cedar Rapids, Iowa, United States	
Loss	8–2–2	Alexander Otsuka	TKO (corner stoppage)	Pride 4	11 October 1998	2	10:00	Tokyo, Japan	
Win	8–1–2	Gary Goodridge	Submission (heel hook)	Pride 2	15 March 1998	1	9:09	Yokohama, Japan	
Win	7–1–2	Patrick Smith	Submission (heel hook)	World Vale Tudo Championship 4	16 March 1997	1	0:39	Brazil	
Draw	6–1–2	Oleg Taktarov	Draw	World Vale Tudo Championship 2	10 November 1996	1	31:12	Brazil	
Win	6–1–1	Steve Jennum	TKO (submission to punches)	World Vale Tudo Championship 1	14 August 1996	1	1:44	Tokyo, Japan	Won WVC Superfight Championship.
Loss	5–1–1	Oleg Taktarov	Decision	Ultimate Ultimate 1995	16 December 1995	1	18:00	Denver, Colorado, United States	Ultimate Ultimate 1995 Tournament Semifinals.
Win	5–0–1	Keith Hackney	Submission (rear naked choke)	Ultimate Ultimate 1995	16 December 1995	1	2:39	Denver, Colorado, United States	Ultimate Ultimate 1995 Tournament Quarterfinals.
Win	4–0–1	Paul Varelans	TKO (leg kicks and punches)	UFC 7	8 September 1995	1	13:17	Buffalo, New York, United States	Won the UFC 7 Tournament.
Win	3–0–1	Remco Pardoel	Submission (position)	UFC 7	8 September 1995	1	12:27	Buffalo, New York, United States	UFC 7 Tournament Semifinals.
Win	2–0–1	Larry Cureton	Submission (heel hook)	UFC 7	8 September 1995	1	3:23	Buffalo, New York, United States	UFC 7 Tournament Quarterfinals.
Win	1–0–1	Francisco Francisco	Submission (rear naked choke)	Ruas Vale Tudo	1 July 1992	1	0:26	Manaus, Brazil	
Draw	0–0–1	Fernando Pinduka	Draw	Jiu-Jitsu vs Luta Livre	30 November 1984	1	20:00	Rio de Janeiro, Brazil	

== Filmography ==
Year	Title	Role
1992	Kickboxer III: The Art of War	Himself
2004	The Eliminator	Salvador

Preceded by Oleg Taktarov	UFC 7 Tournament winner 8 September 1995	Succeeded by Dan Severn
