= Marcus Bossett =

American MMA fighter

- Born: United States
- Other names: The Grasshopper
- Nationality: American
- Height: 6 ft 1 in (1.85 m)
- Weight: 220 lb (100 kg; 16 st)
- Division: Heavyweight
- Style: Karate, Wrestling
- Rank: 3rd Degree Black Belt in Shorin Ryu Karate
- Years active: 1994–1996 (MMA)

Mixed martial arts record
- Total: 4
- Wins: 1
- By knockout: 1
- Losses: 3
- By submission: 3

Other information
- Mixed martial arts record from Sherdog

Marcus Bossett is a retired American mixed martial artist who competed in the heavyweight division. Marcus fought Eldo Dias Xavier at UFC 4, though there appears to be no surviving footage of the bout as it was untelevised for unknown reasons. Marcus then lost to Dan Severn in the semifinals, before competing one more time at UFC Ultimate Ultimate 1996 where he ultimately lost to Steve Nelmark

== Career accomplishments ==
=== Mixed martial arts ===
- Ultimate Fighting Championship
  - UFC Encyclopedia Awards
    - Knockout of the Night (One time) vs. Eldo Dias Xavier

== Mixed martial arts record ==
Professional record breakdown
4 matches	1 win	3 losses
By knockout	1	0
By submission	0	3
By decision	0	0

Res.	Record	Opponent	Method	Event	Date	Round	Time	Location	Notes
Loss	1–3	Steve Nelmark	Submission (choke)	UFC - Ultimate Ultimate 1996	December 7, 1996	1	1:37	Birmingham, Alabama, United States	
Loss	1–2	Carl Franks	Submission (armbar)	UFCF - United Full Contact Federation 1	September 8, 1995	1	8:00		
Loss	1–1	Dan Severn	Submission (arm-triangle choke)	UFC 4 - Revenge of the Warriors	December 16, 1994	1	0:52	Tulsa, Oklahoma, United States	
Win	1–0	Eldo Dias Xavier	KO (strikes)	UFC 4 - Revenge of the Warriors	December 16, 1994	1	4:55	Tulsa, Oklahoma, United States	

== See also ==
- List of male mixed martial artists
