= UFC 9 =

UFC mixed martial arts event in 1996

UFC 9: Shamrock vs. Severn 2
- The poster for UFC 9: Shamrock vs. Severn 2
- Promotion: Ultimate Fighting Championship
- Date: May 17, 1996
- Venue: Cobo Arena
- City: Detroit, Michigan
- Attendance: 10,000
- Buyrate: 141,000

Event chronology
UFC 8: David vs. Goliath	UFC 9: Shamrock vs. Severn 2	UFC 10: The Tournament

UFC 9: Motor City Madness was a mixed martial arts event held by the Ultimate Fighting Championship on May 17, 1996, at the Cobo Arena in Detroit, Michigan. The event was seen live on pay-per-view in the United States, and later released on home video.

== History ==
UFC 9 was the first UFC production not to feature the tournament format (which was brought back by popular demand at UFC 10). Instead, it featured an entire card of regular bouts. The card featured seven bouts and an alternate bout to fill time for the pay-per-view broadcast.

The main event was the highly anticipated rematch between reigning UFC Superfight Champion Ken Shamrock and number one contender Dan Severn, who had fought one year earlier at UFC 6 for the UFC Superfight Championship, with Shamrock reigning victorious.

The UFC drew national criticism leading up to the event, due in large part to Arizona Senator John McCain's letter writing campaign against the "brutal spectacle" of no holds barred fighting. After a legal battle in the Detroit courts up until 4:30 p.m. on the day of the show, the UFC was allowed to continue, but with modified rules.

The special rules included no closed fisted strikes to the head and no headbutts – a rule that referee John McCarthy attempted to enforce, but with little success. Before the show, fighters were warned not to use closed fisted strikes under penalty of arrest. Although many fights that night included closed fisted striking, no fighters were arrested.

Due in part to this special rule, the Superfight between Dan Severn and Ken Shamrock is widely considered one of the worst MMA fights of all time, with the fighters circling each other for nearly 20 minutes with little or no contact.

== Aftermath ==
Following the legal battle over UFC 9, Senator John McCain was successful in pulling UFC pay-per-view broadcasts from numerous cable systems, including TCI cable, which greatly hurt pay-per-view buy rates.

== Results ==
Superfight Championship
Weight class				Method	Round	Time	Notes
N/A	Dan Severn	def.	Ken Shamrock (c)	Decision (split)		30:00	(Note: For the UFC Superfight Championship.)
Main Card
N/A	Steve Nelmark	def.	Tai Bowden	TKO (doctor stoppage)		7:25
N/A	Cal Worsham	def.	Zane Frazier	TKO (punches)		3:14
N/A	Rafael Carino	def.	Matt Andersen	TKO (punches)		5:32
N/A	Mark Schultz	def.	Gary Goodridge	TKO (cut)		12:00
N/A	Mark Hall	def.	Koji Kitao	TKO (doctor stoppage - broken nose)		0:40
N/A	Don Frye	def.	Amaury Bitetti	TKO (punches)		9:22

== Encyclopedia awards ==
The following fighters were honored in the October 2011 book titled UFC Encyclopedia.

- Fight of the Night: Don Frye vs. Amaury Bitetti
- Knockout of the Night: Mark Hall

== See also ==
- Ultimate Fighting Championship
- List of UFC champions
- List of UFC events
- 1996 in UFC
