= Tank Abbott =

American mixed martial artist and professional wrestler (born 1965)

- Born: David Lee Abbott; April 26, 1965 (age 61); Huntington Beach, California, U.S.
- Height: 6 ft 0 in (183 cm)
- Weight: 250 lb (113 kg; 17 st 12 lb)
- Division: Super Heavyweight; Heavyweight
- Style: Boxing, Wrestling
- Fighting out of: Huntington Beach, California, U.S.
- Wrestling: CCCAA Wrestling
- Years active: 1995–1998, 2003–2009, 2013

Mixed martial arts record
- Total: 25
- Wins: 10
- By knockout: 7
- By submission: 2
- By decision: 1
- Losses: 15
- By knockout: 8
- By submission: 5
- By decision: 2

Other information
- University: Cypress College; California State University, Long Beach
- Mixed martial arts record from Sherdog

David Lee "Tank" Abbott (born April 26, 1965) is an American retired mixed martial arts fighter, professional wrestler, and author. He currently hosts his own podcast series titled "The Proving Ground with Tank Abbott." Abbott is perhaps best known for being an icon in the early stages of mixed martial arts and the UFC, but has also competed in the PRIDE Fighting Championships, Strikeforce, EliteXC, and Cage Rage, challenging for the UFC heavyweight Championship once in 1997. His fighting style, which he developed brawling in the bars and streets of Huntington Beach, California, was described by his future manager Dave Thomas as "Pit Fighting". He also authored the three novels of the Befor There Were Rules trilogy, Bar Brawler, Street Warrior, and Cage Fighter.

== Background ==
Abbott was born April 26, 1965 and raised in Huntington Beach, California. Abbott began practicing amateur wrestling when he was nine years old, and continued through high school where he also played football. He then continued wrestling in college at Cypress College, where he was a CCCAA All-American. He then attended California State University, Long Beach where he graduated with a degree in history. During this time he was trained in boxing by Noe Cruz who also trained world champion boxer Carlos Palomino at the Westminster Boxing Gym.

However, Abbott was mainly known for the many street fights that he had engaged in, rarely losing. While working at a liquor store to help pay for his college tuition, Abbott encountered a "smart-ass" customer. Abbott beat the customer severely, and the customer, who turned out to be the son of a detective, pressed charges for assault. Abbott was sentenced to six months in jail, the judge saying, "Mr. Abbott, you are a maniac. I'm surprised you haven't killed somebody."

== Mixed martial arts career ==
Abbott started his career in mixed martial arts when he applied to the UFC for its event UFC 6 in Casper, Wyoming. He was introduced to the UFC management by his future manager Dave Thomas, who credited him as a veteran street fighter who lifted 600lbs in bench press and had knocked out four men in his last brawl. Upon this description, the management compared him to the character "Tank Murdock" from the 1978 Clint Eastwood movie Every Which Way But Loose, which encouraged them to give David the nickname of "Tank Abbott" and bill him as a "pit fighter" with over 200 street fights.

According to Abbott, this wasn't the first time he applied to the UFC. Inspired by Kimo Leopoldo's participation in UFC 3, he had tried to enter the promotion as soon as September 1994, but the UFC management only allowed him to fight from UFC 6 onwards, after Royce Gracie had ceased fighting in UFC. Art Davie would later confirm the Gracie family used its input in the management to limit fighters with amateur wrestling backgrounds, like Abbott himself, from entering the first events.

=== Ultimate Fighting Championship (1995–1998) ===
Abbott made his debut at UFC 6 in July 1995 as scheduled. He actively cultivated the tough character he had been given, firstly by giving a rude interview in which he derided martial arts and then by knocking out the Hawaiian Kapu Kuialua fighter John Matua, who weighed 400 lb, in the first 18 seconds of his opening fight. Abbott further solidified his reputation by mocking Matua's convulsions after the KO while the ring doctors rushed the cage. Abbott advanced to the next round and was pitted against a similarly heavier adversary, Paul Varelans. After returning to the cage in midst of strong cheers, Abbott knocked out Varelans by ground and pound and knee strikes, all while mockingly smiling at his opponent laying beneath him.

At the finals of the tournament, Abbott faced the Russian Oleg Taktarov in a fight that the announcers touted as a "skill vs. power" bout. Just as described, the match saw Abbott blocking Taktarov's artful grappling attempts and damaging him in turn with hard punches and uppercuts. With both men becoming increasingly tired due to their previous fights and the high altitude of the location, the action moved to Taktarov's guard, where Abbott avoided multiple submission attempts and punished him further. The fight was restarted standing, which would give Abbott the advantage, but by this point he was exhausted enough for a slightly better conditioned Taktarov to pull him down and lock a rear naked choke, thus winning the fight at the 17 minutes mark. Both men collapsed in exhaustion after the fight, and Taktarov had to be carried out of the cage. Although Abbott had failed at winning the tournament, referee John McCarthy considered him the next big star of the promotion after Royce Gracie.

Abbott returned the same year as part of the Ultimate Ultimate event, which saw runners-up and champions from the previous UFC tournaments gathered together. He first fought UFC 3 winner and ninjutsu practitioner Steve Jennum, whom he outweighed by 80lbs. Although Jennum proved capable of avoiding Tank's strikes, Abbott submitted him with an improvised neck crank. However, his next opponent was Dan Severn, UFC 5 champion and a much more decorated freestyle wrestler than Abbott. Tank initiated the action strong, but he was overpowered and eventually kept on all fours while Severn rained elbows and knees on him. After fifteen minutes of absorbing strikes, Abbott managed to free himself, but Severn kept dominance until the end of the fight, which gained him the judges's unanimous decision.

Abbott's next UFC appearance would be in September 1996, at UFC 11. Accompanied by a young Tito Ortiz and dragging a knee injury without adequate surgery, Tank entered the cage to fight professional boxer Sam Adkins, an affair he ended quickly in the first round by forearm choke against the cage wall. This tournament venture was cut short, however, by Scott Ferrozzo, a contender from Don Frye's entourage who was billed as a "pitfighter" like Abbott himself. Ferrozzo was also fresher, as he came to replace Jerry Bohlander, who was injured in the previous round. The two fought evenly in the clinch for minutes, with Tank coming closer to a stoppage by opening a cut in Scott's face, but Ferrozzo eventually gained the advantage with knees to the body and a heavy uppercut. At overtime, now with the crowd cheering for Ferrozzo, the latter controlled the action with knees and punches to win the judges decision. According to Abbott, Ferrozzo had to go to the hospital after the match, while he did not.

As the first time, Abbott was invited back to the next edition of Ultimate Ultimate at December 1996. His first opponent was Cal Worsham, a former U.S Marine whom Tank disposed of swiftly via wrestling and punching. A short brawl happened after the bout when Worsham suddenly tried to attack Abbott, as Abbott had kept hitting him while the referee stopped the bout. Abbott's next fight met an even more brutal ending, as his opponent, Steve Nelmark, fell against the fence upon being knocked out and got his neck folded in a dangerous position. Despite the incident, Tank remained calm, and he was later quoted as "If that man weren't in the octagon, I would have kicked him about five times in the face. And I have, and I've done it many times."

At the end of the event, Abbott met his final adversary in Don Frye himself, with the winner of the fight gaining a title shot against Dan Severn. Despite Frye being a superior wrestler like Severn, Abbott caught him with a hard left jab and dominated the match onwards with wild strikes, appearing as if he could win by KO at any moment. However, by capitalizing on a punch in which Abbott overestimated and slipped down, Frye managed to capture his back and lock a rear naked choke, winning the fight. Abbott claimed he made a mistake by letting Frye get his hooks in, as he would have been planning to use them to snap his ankles. For his part, Frye praised Abbott, going to say the match featured the hardest hits he received in his entire career.

Ultimate Ultimate 1996 was the last UFC tournament in which Abbott partook, as around the same time the UFC began switching away from the tournament format. Abbott's fortunes declined with the arrival of better trained mixed martial artists, who posed a much bigger challenge than the previously inconsistent opponents from the earlier UFC events. His debut in this new format was at UFC 13 in May 1997 against Vitor Belfort, whose fast-hitting boxing style had been criticized by Abbott while doing special commentary at UFC 12. Abbott scored an early takedown, but moved back to trade hits with Belfort standing; this proved to be an error, as Vitor immediately overwhelmed him with punches and dropped him to all fours. The Brazilian kept attacking Abbott until the match was stopped.

In October 1997, Abbott was contacted to fight in the Japanese Pride 1 event against Kimo Leopoldo, but he was unable to do so, having to be replaced by Dan Severn. Ironically, shortly after Abbott replaced Severn himself with four days notice in a title match for the UFC Heavyweight Championship against Maurice Smith at UFC 15, a circumstance he described as "literally falling off the barstool into the octagon." Trying hard to press the action, Tank shockingly dropped the kickboxing champion with an early shot, but Smith controlled him through his defensive guard and a Kimura attempt. The action was restarted standing, but by this point Abbott was exhausted and offered little resistance to Smith's low kicks, prompting the referee to stop the match.

Abbott bounced back from his losses with his performance at the first UFC show on Japanese soil, UFC Japan, where he was pitted against shoot-style wrestler Yoji Anjo. The American dominated the match with takedowns and right hands, avoiding submission attempts with short bursts of ground and pound every time they hit the mat, which eventually gained him the unanimous decision win. The event featured a tournament format, but Abbott forfeited due to a broken hand acquired while punching Anjo.

Back in the United States, at UFC 17, he followed with an impressive victory over renowned luta livre fighter Hugo Duarte, who was famous for his vale tudo fights against Rickson Gracie. Duarte had previously criticized Tank and his fighting skills, and he came close to proving himself right by almost locking a rear naked choke and an armbar in the first few seconds. However, Abbott blocked them successfully and captured Duarte's back, landing heavy punches from there, completely knocking the Brazilian out. At the same event, Tank was suspended by UFC for verbally fighting with Allan Goes, which according to Abbott happened because he had cheered for the opponent of Goes's teammate Wallid Ismail at UFC 12.

In October 1998, Tank visited Brazil next as part of UFC Brazil, facing another luta livre fighter, Pedro Rizzo, who came on a 5–0 record. The Brazilian proved to be a dangerous opponent when he stopped Abbott's early barrage with several hard rights, but Abbott answered with a counterpunch that opened a cut near Pedro's eye. Rizzo then adopted a more evasive approach, avoiding Tank's overhands and grinding him with low kicks and his own counterpunches, which Tank counteracted himself again by taking Rizzo down and besieging his guard. However, the match had drained Tank's energy, and Rizzo was able of dominating him with strikes from the bottom and more kick and punch combinations while standing. At the end, the Brazilian knocked Abbott out for the win, becoming the first opponent to do so. Abbott praised Rizzo after the match, although he claimed to believe the cage canvas had been greased to hinder the footing of wrestlers like him.

After his match with Rizzo, Abbott retired from MMA.

=== Return (2003–2013) ===
After his stint in professional wrestling, Abbott returned to mixed martial arts in 2003.

Abbott's return fight was on February 23, 2003, at UFC 41, against Frank Mir. He lost his return bout via toe hold submission less than a minute into round one.

His next fight would be against fellow UFC veteran, Kimo Leopoldo at UFC 43. Abbott was taken down seconds into the fight, and was submitted via arm-triangle choke.

Abbott then faced Wesley "Cabbage" Correira at UFC 45. After a back-and-forth brawl, Abbott lost the fight via TKO after the ringside doctor determined he was unable to continue after suffering a cut over his right eye. Abbott and his corner got into a minor brawl with Correira's team after being angered by Correira's taunting when being declared the winner. Abbott was released from the UFC afterwards.

Abbott later had a rematch with Correira, at Rumble on the Rock 7. Abbott secured his first victory since his return, knocking Correira out with a hard right hand in the first round, becoming the first person to knock Correira out.

Abbott's next fight was on August 28, 2005, against highly decorated judoka Hidehiko Yoshida at Pride Final Conflict 2005. Abbott lost via single wing choke submission in the first round.

Abbott's next fight was against Paul Buentello, headlining Strikeforce: Tank vs. Buentello on October 7, 2006. Abbott lost via knockout 43 seconds into the fight.

Abbott then fought Gary Turner at the main event of Cage Rage 21 on April 21, 2007. Abbott lost via TKO after a barrage of punches from Turner early in the first round.

Abbott's last high-profile fight was against Kimbo Slice in the main event of EliteXC: Street Certified. Abbott was knocked down early, but the fight was restarted after Kimbo landed shots to the back of Abbott's head. Abbott would lose the bout via knockout seconds later.

His next fight was against former PRIDE veteran Mike Bourke on February 13, 2009, at the Selland Arena in Fresno, California, as part of the Valentine's Eve Massacre Event. Abbott knocked out Bourke with a punch that inadvertently landed to the back of Bourke's head, securing a victory for the first time in nearly four years.

In 2011 Abbott participated in an unsanctioned "backyard brawl" against Scott Ferrozzo, whom he previously fought at UFC 11. Abbott knocked down Ferrozzo early with a punch, before taking his back and holding dominant position for over 15 minutes, occasionally landing punches. He was declared the winner via unanimous decision. Bouncing back with a win following his loss to Slice, At King of the Cage: Fighting Legends, on April 13, 2013, Abbott fought for the Superfight Championship. He was defeated by longtime veteran Ruben "Warpath" Villareal by way of a 2nd-round TKO.

Abbott was expected to face fellow MMA veteran Dan Severn for the upstart UR Fight promotion on March 20, 2016. The contest was cancelled the day prior to the event as Abbott could not pass the required medical tests per the Arizona Fight Commission.

== Professional wrestling career ==
=== World Championship Wrestling (1999–2000) ===
Abbott worked as a professional wrestler with World Championship Wrestling (WCW); initially he was brought in as an opponent for Goldberg, on the understanding he was a "legitimate" fighter—who could render any opponent unconscious with a single punch, which became his wrestling finisher, 'The Phantom Right'—and could boost Goldberg's reputation. This feud, however, never developed.

Mere days prior to the Souled Out pay-per-view in 2000, WCW head writer Vince Russo was given the responsibility of booking a match to crown a new WCW World Heavyweight Champion. This came at the news that both WCW Champion Bret Hart and Jeff Jarrett, two of the company's top performers, were injured and could not participate at the event. To the dismay of company officials, Russo suggested having the mid-card Abbott win the Championship, but only to hold it briefly. The scenario would not take place, and Russo was consequently released from WCW while other bookers composed the Souled Out card, choosing Chris Benoit to win the belt. Abbott instead faced Jerry Flynn, a legitimate black belt in taekwondo and defeated him on the pay-per-view.

At the Superbrawl pay-per-view in 2000, Abbott was taking on Big Al in a leather jacket on a pole match. During the match, Abbott pulled a knife on Big Al, holding it to Al's throat and shouting "I could fucking kill you!" before the cameras cut away. Abbott would win the match, but his push virtually ended at that point and he was featured in segments with the boy band parody stable 3 Count as their "biggest fan". Abbott began feuding with the stable after they would not let him join the band, until he was released from WCW in September 2000.

=== Later career (2000, 2008) ===
After being released from WCW, Abbott made an appearance for NWA Wildside on December 14, 2000, teaming with Kevin Northcutt losing to Bob Sapp and Stone Mountain in Cornelia, Georgia.

Abbott returned to the ring one last time on August 15, 2008, for Inoki Genome Federation in Tokyo, Japan losing to UFC fighter Josh Barnett.

== Other media ==
In 1997, Abbott appeared as himself in the TV show Friends, defeating Jon Favreau's character, the billionaire Pete Becker, who was dating Monica at the time. He appeared as himself in the 2013 web series Black Dynamite Teaches a Hard Way!, where a Black Dynamite mannequin teaches him what to do in case of an earthquake.

On January 24, 2008, Abbott appeared as a special guest on Jimmy Kimmel Live' tonight. In June 2024, Abbott was interviewed on The Joe Rogan experience.

Abbott features as a playable character in the video game WCW Backstage Assault. In July 2026, Abbott was added to EA Sports UFC 6 as downloadable content.

== Personal life ==
In December 2018, Abbott revealed he had undergone liver transplantation, which he said was a consequence of "my wild life". Abbott said he suffered several strokes during the procedure, but survived and the transplant operation was successful.

== Championships and accomplishments ==
=== Mixed martial arts ===
- George Tragos/Lou Thesz Professional Wrestling Hall of Fame
  - George Tragos Award (2025)
- Ultimate Fighting Championship
  - UFC 6 Tournament Runner-Up
  - Ultimate Ultimate 1996 Tournament Runner-Up
  - Ultimate Ultimate 1995 Semifinalist
  - UFC 11 Tournament Semifinalist
  - UFC Japan Heavyweight Tournament Semifinalist
  - Viewer's Choice Award
  - UFC Encyclopedia Awards
    - Fight of the Night (Three times) vs. Oleg Taktarov, Scott Ferrozzo and Don Frye
    - Knockout of the Night (One time) vs. John Matua
  - 1x UFC Heavyweight Championship Contender
  - Record for most tournaments competed in, in UFC history (Five)

=== Wrestling ===
- CCCAA All-American

=== Professional wrestling ===
- Pro Wrestling Illustrated
  - Ranked No. 89 of the top 500 singles wrestlers of the PWI 500 in 2000

== Mixed martial arts record ==
Professional record breakdown
25 matches	10 wins	15 losses
By knockout	7	8
By submission	2	5
By decision	1	2

Res.	Record	Opponent	Method	Event	Date	Round	Time	Location	Notes
Loss	10–15	Ruben Villareal	TKO (punches)	King of the Cage: Fighting Legends	April 13, 2013	2	2:06	Oroville, California, United States	For the KOTC Superfight Championship.
Win	10–14	Mike Bourke	KO (punch)	War Gods/Ken Shamrock: Valentine's Eve Massacre	February 13, 2009	1	0:29	Fresno, California, United States	
Loss	9–14	Kimbo Slice	KO (punches)	EliteXC: Street Certified	February 16, 2008	1	0:43	Miami, Florida, United States	
Loss	9–13	Gary Turner	TKO (punches)	Cage Rage 21	April 21, 2007	1	2:27	London, England	
Loss	9–12	Paul Buentello	KO (punch)	Strikeforce: Tank vs. Buentello	October 7, 2006	1	0:43	Fresno, California, United States	
Loss	9–11	Hidehiko Yoshida	Submission (single wing choke)	PRIDE Final Conflict 2005	August 28, 2005	1	7:40	Saitama, Saitama, Japan	
Win	9–10	Wesley Correira	KO (punch)	Rumble on the Rock 7	May 5, 2005	1	1:23	Honolulu, Hawaii, United States	
Loss	8–10	Wesley Correira	TKO (doctor stoppage)	UFC 45	November 21, 2003	1	2:14	Uncasville, Connecticut, United States	
Loss	8–9	Kimo Leopoldo	Submission (arm-triangle choke)	UFC 43	June 6, 2003	1	1:59	Las Vegas, Nevada, United States	
Loss	8–8	Frank Mir	Submission (toe hold)	UFC 41	February 28, 2003	1	0:46	Atlantic City, New Jersey, United States	
Loss	8–7	Pedro Rizzo	KO (punch)	UFC Brazil	October 16, 1998	1	8:07	São Paulo, Brazil	
Win	8–6	Hugo Duarte	TKO (punches)	UFC 17	May 15, 1998	1	0:43	Mobile, Alabama, United States	
Win	7–6	Yoji Anjo	Decision (unanimous)	UFC Japan: Ultimate Japan	December 21, 1997	1	15:00	Yokohama, Japan	
Loss	6–6	Maurice Smith	TKO (leg kicks)	UFC 15	October 17, 1997	1	8:08	Bay St. Louis, Mississippi, United States	For the UFC Heavyweight Championship.
Loss	6–5	Vitor Belfort	TKO (punches)	UFC 13	May 30, 1997	1	0:52	Augusta, Georgia, United States	
Loss	6–4	Don Frye	Submission (rear-naked choke)	Ultimate Ultimate 1996	December 7, 1996	1	1:22	Birmingham, Alabama, United States	Ultimate Ultimate 96 Final.
Win	6–3	Steve Nelmark	KO (punch)	Ultimate Ultimate 1996	December 7, 1996	1	1:03	Birmingham, Alabama, United States	
Win	5–3	Cal Worsham	TKO (submission to punches)	Ultimate Ultimate 1996	December 7, 1996	1	2:51	Birmingham, Alabama, United States	
Loss	4–3	Scott Ferrozzo	Decision (unanimous)	UFC 11	September 20, 1996	1	15:00	Augusta, Georgia, United States	
Win	4–2	Sam Adkins	Submission (forearm choke)	UFC 11	September 20, 1996	1	2:06	Augusta, Georgia, United States	
Loss	3–2	Dan Severn	Decision (unanimous)	Ultimate Ultimate 1995	December 16, 1995	1	18:00	Denver, Colorado, United States	
Win	3–1	Steve Jennum	Submission (neck crank)	Ultimate Ultimate 1995	December 16, 1995	1	1:14	Denver, Colorado, United States	
Loss	2–1	Oleg Taktarov	Submission (rear-naked choke)	UFC 6	July 14, 1995	1	17:47	Casper, Wyoming, United States	UFC 6 Tournament Final.
Win	2–0	Paul Varelans	TKO (punches)	UFC 6	July 14, 1995	1	1:53	Casper, Wyoming, United States	
Win	1–0	John Matua	KO (punches)	UFC 6	July 14, 1995	1	0:18	Casper, Wyoming, United States	
