= Joe Moreira =

Brazilian martial artist

- Nationality: Brazilian
- Style: Brazilian Jiu-Jitsu, Judo, Ruas Vale Tudo
- Teachers: Carlson Gracie, Sr., Reyson Gracie, Reylson Gracie, Rolls Gracie, Mauricio LaCerda, Francisco Mansour
- Rank: 9th deg. BJJ red belt; 3rd dan Judo black belt

Other information
- Mixed martial arts record from Sherdog

Jose Carlos Moreira is a Brazilian Jiu-Jitsu practitioner and a former mixed martial artist.

== Career ==
=== Mixed martial arts ===
Following his long string of Jiu-Jitsu and Judo victories, Moreira decided to test his skills in mixed martial arts competition via the Ultimate Fighting Championship. On February 16, 1996, Moreira fought the six-foot-eight-inch, 360-pound Paul Varelans in the UFC 8 and lost by a narrow decision. He competed again the following year at UFC 14, winning his first match against Yuri Vaulin by unanimous decision, putting him in the finals of the Middleweight bracket. After his bout however, the on-site doctor concluded Moreira showed signs of a concussion, and did not clear him to fight, leading to Moreira being replaced by an alternate.

== Lineage ==
Kano Jigoro → Tomita Tsunejiro → Mitsuyo Maeda → Carlos Gracie → Helio Gracie → Francisco Mansor → Joe Moreira

== Mixed martial arts record ==
Professional record breakdown
4 matches	2 wins	2 losses
By submission	1	0
By decision	1	2

Res.	Record	Opponent	Method	Event	Date	Round	Time	Location	Notes
Loss	2–2	Paul Herrera	Decision	Hitman Fighting Productions 2	November 9, 2002	3	5:00	Santa Ana, California, United States	
Win	2–1	Joe Son	Submission (terror)	Xtreme Pankration 2	April 12, 2002	1	N/A	Los Angeles, California, United States	
Win	1–1	Yuri Vaulin	Decision (unanimous)	UFC 14	July 27, 1997	1	15:00	Birmingham, Alabama, United States	
Loss	0–1	Paul Varelans	Decision (unanimous)	UFC 8	February 16, 1996	1	10:00	San Juan, Puerto Rico	

== See also ==
- List of Brazilian Jiu-Jitsu practitioners
