= Paul Varelans =

American martial artist (1969–2021)

- Born: September 17, 1969; Sunnyvale, California, U.S.
- Died: January 16, 2021 (aged 51); Atlanta, Georgia, U.S.
- Other names: The Polar Bear
- Height: 6 ft 8 in (2.03 m)
- Weight: 300 lb (140 kg; 21 st)
- Style: Wrestling
- Fighting out of: Fairbanks, Alaska
- Years active: 1995–1998

Mixed martial arts record
- Total: 18
- Wins: 9
- By knockout: 6
- By submission: 2
- By decision: 1
- Losses: 9
- By knockout: 7
- By submission: 1
- By decision: 1

Other information
- Mixed martial arts record from Sherdog

Paul Varelans (September 17, 1969 – January 16, 2021) was an American professional mixed martial artist. He competed in the Ultimate Fighting Championship from 1995 to 1996, and had a worked match in Extreme Championship Wrestling in 1996.

== Background ==
Varelans attended West Valley High School in Fairbanks, Alaska, where he participated in football and wrestling. Varelans was a walk-on athlete at San Jose State University before starting his career in no holds barred. In the early days of UFC, he was billed as a practitioner of "Trap Fighting," one of the nominal fighting styles created at the time to give fighters more legitimacy.

== Career ==
Varelans made his UFC debut on July 14, 1995, at Ultimate Fighting Championship 6: Clash of the Titans, winning by KO over Cal Worsham.

On June 22, 1996, at ECW's Hardcore Heaven event, Varelans faced, and was choked out by, ECW star Taz, in what was promoted as a "shoot fight". Although the event was promoted as a legitimate shoot fight, Varelans agreed beforehand to lose via submission. In her 2001 autobiography Missy Hyatt, First Lady of Wrestling, Missy Hyatt claims that Varelans agreed to lose if she performed fellatio on him afterwards, but Hyatt refused saying that she did not "blow jobbers". Subsequently, Varelans allegedly became irrational and destroyed the locker room. He preceded this with two house show matches, defeating Jason Helton.

On July 29, 1997, he went to Japan for a one night appearance for Kingdom and lost a worked fight to Yoji Anjo by knockout.

== Death ==
In December 2020, news surfaced that Varelans contracted COVID-19 during the COVID-19 pandemic, and as a result, was placed on mechanical ventilation and then put into a medically induced coma. He died in Atlanta, Georgia, on January 16, 2021, aged 51.

== Championships and accomplishments ==
- International Fighting Championship
  - IFC Kombat in Kyiv tournament semifinalist
- Ultimate Fighting Championship
  - UFC 7 tournament finalist
  - UFC 6 tournament semifinalist
  - UFC 8 tournament semifinalist
  - UFC Encyclopedia Awards
    - Fight of the Night (Two times) vs. Marco Ruas and Dan Severn
- World Vale Tudo Championship
  - WVC 5 tournament semifinalist

== Mixed martial arts record ==
Professional record breakdown
18 matches	9 wins	9 losses
By knockout	6	7
By submission	2	1
By decision	1	1

Res.	Record	Opponent	Method	Event	Date	Round	Time	Location	Notes
Win	9–9	Dick Vrij	KO (punch)	Rings Holland: The King of Rings	February 8, 1998	2	0:30	Amsterdam, Netherlands	
Loss	8–9	Nick Nutter	TKO (cut)	World Vale Tudo Championship 5	February 3, 1998	1	3:42	Recife, Brazil	WVC 5 semifinals.
Win	8–8	Waldir dos Anjos	TKO (submission to punches)	World Vale Tudo Championship 5	February 3, 1998	1	2:36	Recife, Brazil	WVC 5 quarterfinals.
Loss	7–8	Carlos Barreto	TKO (elbows and punches)	Brazil Open '97	June 15, 1997	1	2:33	Brazil	
Win	7–7	Scott Taylor	Submission (forearm choke)	Extreme Challenge 6	May 10, 1997	1	0:42	Battle Creek, Michigan, United States	
Loss	6–7	Ryushi Yanagisawa	Decision (lost points)	Pancrase: Alive 4	April 27, 1997	1	15:00	Urayasu, Chiba, Japan	
Loss	6–6	Mark Kerr	TKO (knees and punches)	World Vale Tudo Championship 3	January 19, 1997	1	2:06	São Paulo, Brazil	WVC 3 quarterfinals.
Loss	6–5	Kimo Leopoldo	TKO (corner stoppage)	Ultimate Ultimate 1996	December 7, 1996	1	9:08	Birmingham, Alabama, United States	Ultimate Ultimate 96 quarterfinals.
Win	6–4	Shinji Katase	TKO (submission to punches)	U-Japan	November 17, 1996	1	0:35	Japan	
Loss	5–4	Igor Vovchanchyn	KO (punches)	IFC 1: Kombat in Kyiv	March 30, 1996	1	6:20	Kyiv, Ukraine	IFC 1 semifinals.
Win	5–3	Valery Nikkolin	TKO (corner stoppage)	IFC 1: Kombat in Kyiv	March 30, 1996	1	5:12	Kyiv, Ukraine	IFC 1 quarterfinals.
Win	4–3	Joe Moreira	Decision (unanimous)	UFC 8	February 16, 1996	1	10:00	San Juan, Puerto Rico	UFC 8 quarterfinals. Varelans withdrew from the tournament due to injury.
Loss	3–3	Dan Severn	Submission (arm-triangle choke)	Ultimate Ultimate 1995	December 16, 1995	1	1:01	Denver, Colorado, United States	Ultimate Ultimate 1995 quarterfinals.
Loss	3–2	Marco Ruas	TKO (leg kicks and punches)	UFC 7	September 8, 1995	1	13:17	Buffalo, New York, United States	UFC 7 finals.
Win	3–1	Mark Hall	Submission (americana)	UFC 7	September 8, 1995	1	1:04	Buffalo, New York, United States	UFC 7 semifinals.
Win	2–1	Gerry Harris	TKO (submission to elbows)	UFC 7	September 8, 1995	1	1:07	Buffalo, New York, United States	UFC 7 quarterfinals.
Loss	1–1	Tank Abbott	TKO (punches)	UFC 6	July 14, 1995	1	1:53	Casper, Wyoming, United States	UFC 6 semifinals.
Win	1–0	Cal Worsham	KO (elbow)	UFC 6	July 14, 1995	1	1:02	Casper, Wyoming, United States	UFC 6 quarterfinals.

== See also ==
- List of deaths due to COVID-19
