= 1997 in Pride FC =

Mixed martial arts events

Information
- First date: October 11, 1997
- Last date: October 11, 1997

Events
- Total events: 1

Fights
- Total fights: 7

Chronology
1997 in Pride FC	1998 in Pride

The year 1997 was the 1st year in the history of the Pride Fighting Championships, a mixed martial arts promotion based in Japan. 1997 had only 1 event, Pride 1.

== Debut Pride FC fighters ==
Given that this is Pride FC's debut year, all fighters are also participating in their debut Pride FC fight.

- Akira Shoji
- Branko Cikatic
- Dan Severn
- Gary Goodridge
- John Dixson
- Kazunari Murakami
- Kimo Leopoldo
- Koji Kitao
- Nathan Jones
- Nobuhiko Takada
- Oleg Taktarov
- Ralph White
- Renzo Gracie
- Rickson Gracie

== Events list ==
#	Event	Japanese name	Date held	Venue	City	Attendance
1	Pride 1	—N/a	October 11, 1997	Tokyo Dome	Tokyo, Japan	47,000

== Pride 1 ==
Pride 1
- Promotion: Pride Fighting Championships
- Date: October 11, 1997
- Venue: Tokyo Dome
- City: Tokyo, Japan
- Attendance: 47,860

Event chronology
Pride 1	Pride 2

Pride 1 was an inaugural event held on October 11, 1997, at The Tokyo Dome in Tokyo, Japan.

In addition to the MMA bouts, there was one kickboxing bout between K-1 Grand Prix Champion Branko Cikatić and Ralph White. The English language commentary for this event was provided by Stephen Quadros and Bas Rutten.

=== Results ===
Main card
Weight class				Method	Round	Time	Notes
	(Brazil) Rickson Gracie	def.	(Japan) Nobuhiko Takada	Submission (armbar)	1	4:47
	(United States) Kimo Leopoldo	vs.	(United States) Dan Severn	Draw (time expired)	1	30:00
	(Russia) Igor Meindert	vs.	(Japan) Hiroki Kurosawa	TKO (Referee stoppage)	3	1:16	(Note: Special Rules fight, Kurosawa sustained knee damage, rupturing his cruciate ligaments.)
	(Croatia) Branko Cikatic	vs.	(United States) Ralph White	No Contest	1	1:52	(Note: Kickboxing bout. Cikatic kicked White while on the ground.)
	(Japan) Koji Kitao	def.	(Australia) Nathan Jones	Submission (keylock)	1	2:14
	(Brazil) Renzo Gracie	vs.	(Japan) Akira Shoji	Draw (time expired)	3	10:00
	(Trinidad and Tobago) Gary Goodridge	def.	(Russia) Oleg Taktarov	KO (punch)	1	4:57
	(Japan) Kazunari Murakami	def.	(United States) John Dixson	Submission (armbar)	1	1:34

== See also ==
- Pride Fighting Championships
- List of Pride Fighting Championships champions
- List of Pride Fighting events
