= UFC 7 =

UFC mixed martial arts event in 1995

- The poster for UFC 7
- Promotion: Ultimate Fighting Championship
- Date: September 8, 1995
- Venue: Memorial Auditorium
- City: Buffalo, New York
- Attendance: 9,000
- Buyrate: 190,000

Event chronology
UFC 6: Clash of the Titans	UFC 7	Ultimate Ultimate 1995

UFC 7: The Brawl in Buffalo was a mixed martial arts event held by the Ultimate Fighting Championship on September 8, 1995, at the Memorial Auditorium in Buffalo, New York, United States. The event was seen live on pay per view in the US, and later released on home video.

== History ==
UFC 7 featured an eight-man tournament, a UFC Superfight Championship match between reigning UFC champion Ken Shamrock and UFC 6 tournament winner Oleg Taktarov, and three alternate fights, which were not shown on the live pay-per-view broadcast. The tournament had no weight classes, or weight limits. Each match had no rounds, but a 20-minute time limit was imposed for the quarterfinal and semi-final round matches in the tournament. The finals of the tournament and the Superfight had a 30-minute time limit and, if necessary, a five-minute overtime.

The referee for the main card was 'Big' John McCarthy. Michael Buffer served as the guest ring announcer for the night. Taimak officiated the preliminary bouts on the card.

Marco Ruas won the tournament by defeating Paul Varelans.

This was the first UFC event to be held in the state of New York. After the event, mixed martial arts were illegal in New York, which prohibited UFC or any other promotion from holding any further MMA events in the state; it would take two decades, and significant lobbying, to pass legislation allowing the sport. UFC would not hold another event in the state until UFC 205 in New York City 21 years later; the promotion later returned to Buffalo with UFC 210 in April 2017.

== Results ==
Superfight Championship
Weight class				Method	Round	Time	Notes
N/A	Ken Shamrock (c)	vs.	Oleg Taktarov	Draw		33:00	(Note: Shamrock and Taktarov fought to a draw after 33:00 because there were no judges. Shamrock retains the UFC Superfight Championship.)
Finals
N/A	Marco Ruas	def.	Paul Varelans	TKO (strikes)		13:17
Semifinals
N/A	Paul Varelans	def.	Mark Hall	Submission (keylock)		1:04
N/A	Marco Ruas	def.	Remco Pardoel	Submission (mounted position)		12:27
Quarterfinals
N/A	Paul Varelans	def.	Gerry Harris	TKO (submission to strikes)		1:07
N/A	Mark Hall	def.	Harold Howard	TKO (submission to strikes)		1:41
N/A	Remco Pardoel	def.	Ryan Parker	Submission (Ezekiel choke)		3:05
N/A	Marco Ruas	def.	Larry Cureton	Submission (heel hook)		3:23
Alternate bouts
N/A	Joel Sutton	def.	Geza Kalman	TKO (cut)		0:48
N/A	Onassis Parungao	def.	Francesco Maturi	TKO (submission to strikes)		5:26
N/A	Scott Bessac	def.	David Hood	Submission (guillotine choke)		0:31

== UFC 7 bracket ==
Quarterfinals
(United States) Paul Varelans (Wrestling)	TKO
(United States) Gerry Harris (Kyokushin)	1:07
(United States) Mark Hall (Ju-Jitsu International Federation)	TKO
(Canada) Harold Howard (Gōjū-ryū)	1:41
(Netherlands) Remco Pardoel (Ju-Jitsu International Federation)	SUB
(United States) Ryan Parker (Shorin ryu karate)	3:05
(Brazil) Marco Ruas (Luta Livre)	SUB
(United States) Larry Cureton (Kickboxing)	3:23

Semifinals
(United States) Paul Varelans	SUB
(United States) Mark Hall	1:04
(Netherlands) Remco Pardoel	12:27
(Brazil) Marco Ruas	SUB

Finals
(United States) Paul Varelans	13:17
(Brazil) Marco Ruas	TKO

== Encyclopedia awards ==
The following fighters were honored in the October 2011 book titled UFC Encyclopedia.

- Fight of the Night: Marco Ruas vs. Paul Varelans
- Submission of the Night: Marco Ruas def. Larry Cureton

== See also ==
- Ultimate Fighting Championship
- List of UFC champions
- List of UFC events
- 1995 in UFC
