= 1996 in UFC =

Mixed martial arts events

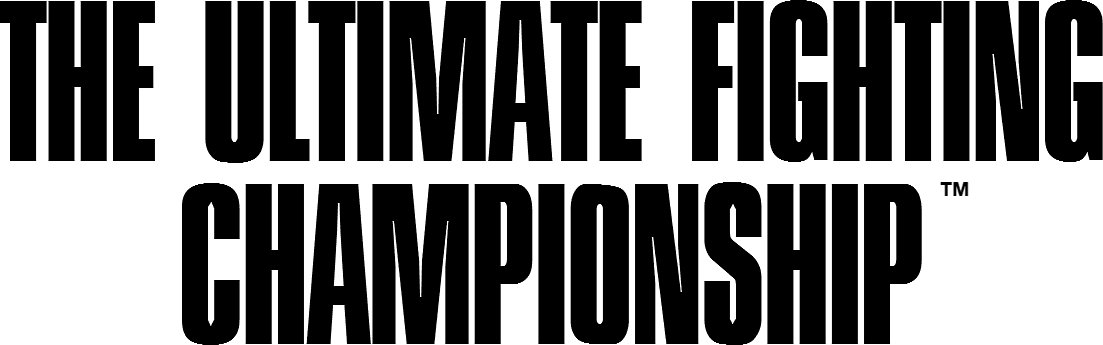

Information
- First date: February 16, 1996
- Last date: December 7, 1996

Events
- Total events: 5
- UFC: 4

Fights
- Total fights: 43
- Title fights: 2

Chronology
1995 in UFC	1996 in UFC	1997 in UFC

The year 1996 was the 4th year in the history of the Ultimate Fighting Championship (UFC), a mixed martial arts promotion based in the United States. In 1996 the UFC held 5 events beginning with, UFC 8: David vs. Goliath.

== Title fights ==
Title fights in 1996
Weight class				Method	Round	Time	Event	Notes
	Ken Shamrock (c)	def.	Kimo Leopoldo	Submission (kneebar)		4:24	UFC 8	(Note: For The UFC Superfight Championship.)
	Dan Severn	def.	Ken Shamrock (c)	Decision (split)		30:00	UFC 9	(Note: For The UFC Superfight Championship.)

== Debut UFC fighters ==
The following fighters fought their first UFC fight in 1996:

ISO	Fighter
(Brazil)	Amaury Bitetti
(United States)	Brian Johnston
(United States)	Dave Berry
(Haiti)	Dieusel Berto
(United States)	Don Frye
(Brazil)	Fabio Gurgel
(Trinidad and Tobago)	Gary Goodridge
(United States)	Jack Nilson
(United States)	Jerry Bohlander
(Brazil)	Joe Moreira

ISO	Fighter
(United States)	John Campetella
(United States)	Julian Sanchez
(United States)	Keith Mielke
(Japan)	Koji Kitao
(United States)	Mark Coleman
(United States)	Mark Schultz
(United States)	Matt Andersen
(Israel)	Moti Horenstein
(United States)	Paul Herrera
(Brazil)	Rafael Carino

ISO	Fighter
(Iran)	Reza Nasri
(Brazil)	Roberto Traven
(United States)	Sam Adkins
(United States)	Sam Fulton
(United States)	Scott Ferrozzo
(United States)	Scott Fiedler
(United States)	Steve Nelmark
(United States)	Tai Bowden
(United States)	Thomas Ramirez

== Events list ==
#	Event	Date	Venue	Location	Attendance
013	UFC The Ultimate Ultimate 2	Dec 7, 1996	Fair Park Arena	Birmingham, Alabama, U.S.	6,000
012	UFC 11: The Proving Ground	Sep 20, 1996	Augusta Civic Center	Augusta, Georgia, U.S.	4,500
011	UFC 10: The Tournament	Jul 12, 1996	Fair Park Arena	Birmingham, Alabama, U.S.	4,300
010	UFC 9: Motor City Madness	May 17, 1996	Cobo Arena	Detroit, Michigan, U.S.	10,000
009	UFC 8: David vs. Goliath	Feb 16, 1996	Coliseo Rubén Rodríguez	Bayamón, Puerto Rico	13,000

== See also ==
- List of UFC champions
- List of UFC events
