= 1997 in UFC =

Mixed martial arts events

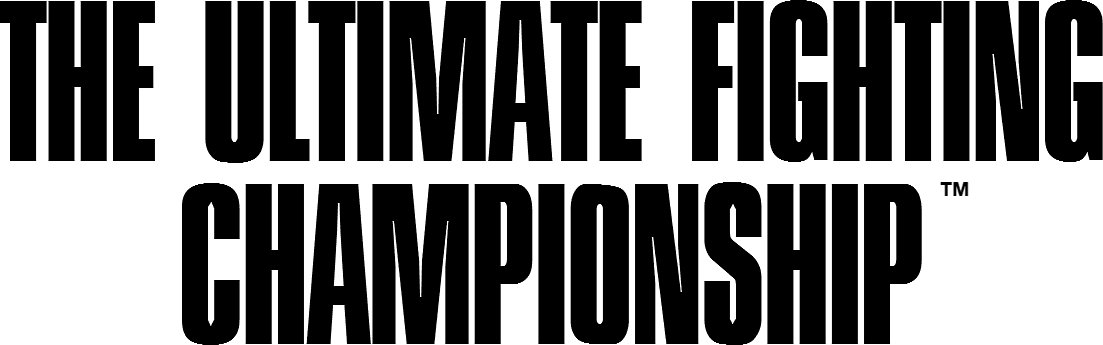

Information
- First date: February 7, 1997
- Last date: December 21, 1997

Events
- Total events: 5
- UFC: 4

Fights
- Total fights: 41
- Title fights: 5

Chronology
1996 in UFC	1997 in UFC	1998 in UFC

The year 1997 was the fifth year in the history of the Ultimate Fighting Championship (UFC), a mixed martial arts promotion based in the United States. In 1997, the UFC held five events beginning with UFC 12: Judgement Day.

== Title fights ==
Title fights in 1997
Weight class				Method	Round	Time	Event	Notes
Heavyweight	Mark Coleman	def.	Dan Severn	Submission (neck crank)		2:57	UFC 12: Judgement Day	(Note: Coleman defeated Severn to become the inaugural UFC Heavyweight Champion.)
Heavyweight	Maurice Smith	def.	Mark Coleman (c)	Decision (unanimous)		21:00	UFC 14: Showdown	(Note: Smith defeated Coleman to become the new UFC Heavyweight Champion.)
Heavyweight	Maurice Smith (c)	def.	Tank Abbott	Submission (exhaustion)		8:08	UFC 15: Collision Course	(Note: Smith defeated Abbott to remain the UFC Heavyweight Champion.)
Light Heavyweight	Frank Shamrock	def.	Kevin Jackson	Submission (armbar)	1	0:16	UFC Ultimate Japan	(Note: Shamrock defeated Jackson to become the inaugural the Light Heavyweight Champion.)
Heavyweight	Randy Couture	def.	Maurice Smith (c)	Decision (majority)	1	21:00	UFC Ultimate Japan	(Note: Couture defeated Smith to become the new UFC Heavyweight Champion. However, he was stripped of the title in October 1998 due to a contract dispute.)

== Debut UFC fighters ==
The following fighters fought their first UFC fight in 1997:

ISO	Fighter	Division
(United States)	Alex Hunter	Heavyweight
(United States)	Brad Kohler	Heavyweight
(Brazil)	Carlos Barreto	Heavyweight
(United States)	Dan Bobish	Heavyweight
(Russia)	Dmitri Stepanov	Heavyweight
(United States)	Donnie Chappell	Heavyweight
(United States)	Dwayne Cason	Heavyweight
(United States)	Enson Inoue	Heavyweight
(United States)	Eric Martin	Heavyweight
(United States)	Frank Shamrock	Light Heavyweight
(United States)	Greg Stott	Heavyweight
(United States)	Harry Moskowitz	Heavyweight
(United States)	Houston Dorr	Heavyweight

ISO	Fighter	Division
(United States)	Jackie Lee	Heavyweight
(United States)	Jim Mullen	Heavyweight
(United States)	Justin Martin	Lightweight
(Japan)	Yoshiki Takahashi	Heavyweight
(Japan)	Kazushi Sakuraba	Heavyweight
(United States)	Kevin Jackson	Light Heavyweight
(Brazil)	Marcus Silveira	Heavyweight
(United States)	Mark Kerr	Heavyweight
(United States)	Maurice Smith	Heavyweight
(United States)	Nick Sanzo	Lightweight
(United States)	Rainy Martinez	Lightweight
(United States)	Randy Couture	Heavyweight

ISO	Fighter	Division
(United States)	Royce Alger	Middleweight
(United States)	Saeed Hosseini	Lightweight
(United States)	Steven Graham	Heavyweight
(United States)	Tito Ortiz	Light Heavyweight
(United States)	Tony Fryklund	Middleweight
(Finland)	Tony Halme	Heavyweight
(United States)	Tra Telligman	Heavyweight
(Brazil)	Vitor Belfort	Heavyweight
(Brazil)	Wallid Ismail	Middleweight
(United States)	Wes Albritton	Heavyweight
(Japan)	Yoji Anjo	Heavyweight
(Russia)	Yuri Vaulin	Heavyweight

== Events list ==
#	Event	Date	Venue	Location	Attendance
14	UFC 12: Judgement Day	Feb 7, 1997	Dothan Civic Center	Dothan, Alabama, U.S.	3,100
15	UFC 13: The Ultimate Force	May 30, 1997	Augusta Civic Center	Augusta, Georgia, U.S.	5,100
16	UFC 14: Showdown	Jul 27, 1997	Boutwell Auditorium	Birmingham, Alabama, U.S.	5,000
17	UFC 15: Collision Course	Oct 17, 1997	Casino Magic Bay St. Louis	Bay St. Louis, Mississippi, U.S.	—N/a
18	UFC Japan: Ultimate Japan	Dec 21, 1997	Yokohama Arena	Yokohama, Japan	5,000

== See also ==
- UFC
- List of UFC champions
- List of UFC events
