= UFC 12 =

UFC mixed martial arts event in 1997

UFC 12: Judgement Day
- The poster for UFC 12: Judgement Day
- Promotion: Ultimate Fighting Championship
- Date: February 7, 1997
- Venue: Dothan Civic Center
- City: Dothan, Alabama
- Attendance: 3,100
- Buyrate: 122,000

Event chronology
Ultimate Ultimate 1996	UFC 12: Judgement Day	UFC 13: Ultimate Force

UFC 12: Judgement Day was a mixed martial arts event held by the Ultimate Fighting Championship on February 7, 1997 at the Dothan Civic Center in Dothan, Alabama. The event was seen live on pay per view in the United States, and later released on home video. This event was also Vitor Belfort's debut in the UFC.

== History ==
UFC 12 was the first UFC event to feature weight classes; heavyweights (200 lb and over) and lightweights (under 200 lb) battled in two separate mini tournaments, each consisting of two semifinal bouts and a finals match.

The event also featured a Superfight between Dan Severn and Mark Coleman. The fight would unify the UFC Superfight Championship with the UFC tournament championship and determine the first ever UFC Heavyweight Champion. Mark Coleman was a late substitution for Don Frye, who had earned the rematch with Severn after winning the Ultimate Ultimate 1996, but was unable to participate in UFC 12 because of injuries he had suffered in that previous event. Frye never returned to the UFC. "Judgement Day" also featured two alternate bouts in case of tournament injury.

UFC 12 marked the first UFC appearance of Vitor Belfort, who won the heavyweight tournament and was only 19 years of age. UFC 12 also marked the first appearance of commentator Joe Rogan, who handled backstage interviews for the event and interviewed the winners of the main events.

After being removed from many pay per view carriers, and with mounting pressure from politicians such as Senator John McCain, the UFC had continuing troubles finding a venue, and a state, that would host UFC 12. It was first announced that UFC 12 would be held in Niagara Falls, New York, to which it was ultimately denied sanctioning rights. Next, it was announced that UFC 12 would be held in Oregon, which soon banned the event. Finally, the UFC returned to Alabama, where it appeared in the small city of Dothan, located about 200 miles southeast of Birmingham.

The UFC would continue to hold events exclusively in the Southern US States (aside from occasional shows in Japan and Brazil) until 2001, when the UFC was sanctioned by the New Jersey State Athletic Commission.

== Results ==
Lightweight Finals
Weight class				Method	Round	Time	Notes
Lightweight	Jerry Bohlander	def.	Nick Sanzo	Submission (crucifix choke)		0:39	(Note: Sanzo replaced Takahashi who broke his hand fighting Ismail.)
Lightweight Semifinals
Lightweight	Jerry Bohlander	def.	Rainy Martinez	Submission (rear-naked choke)		1:18
Lightweight	Yoshiki Takahashi	def.	Wallid Ismail	Decision (unanimous)		15:00	(Note: Takahashi broke his hand during the bout, and was unable to continue in the tournament.)
Lightweight Alternate bout
Lightweight	Nick Sanzo	def.	Jackie Lee	TKO (strikes)		0:48
UFC Heavyweight Championship
Weight class				Method	Round	Time	Notes
Heavyweight	Mark Coleman	def.	Dan Severn	Submission (scarf hold)		2:57	(Note: For the inaugural UFC Heavyweight Championship.)
Heavyweight Finals
Heavyweight	Vitor Belfort	def.	Scott Ferrozzo	TKO (punches)		0:43
Heavyweight Semifinals
Heavyweight	Scott Ferrozzo	def.	Jim Mullen	TKO (knees)		8:02
Heavyweight	Vitor Belfort	def.	Tra Telligman	TKO (cut)		1:17
Heavyweight Alternate bout
Heavyweight	Justin Martin	def.	Eric Martin	Submission (heel hook)		0:14

== UFC 12 Lightweight Tournament Bracket ==
Semifinals
(United States) Jerry Bohlander	SUB
(United States) Rainy Martinez	1:18
(Japan) Yoshiki Takahashi	UD
(Brazil) Wallid Ismail	15:00

Finals
(United States) Jerry Bohlander	SUB
(United States) Nick Sanzo ^{[a]}	0:39

- a. Nick Sanzo replaced Yoshiki Takahashi.

== UFC 12 Heavyweight Tournament Bracket ==
Semifinals
(United States) Scott Ferrozzo	TKO
(United States) Jim Mullen	8:02
(Brazil) Vitor Belfort	TKO
(United States) Tra Telligman	1:17

Finals
(United States) Scott Ferrozzo	0:43
(Brazil) Vitor Belfort	TKO

== Encyclopedia awards ==
The following fighters were honored in the October 2011 book titled UFC Encyclopedia.

- Fight of the Night: Mark Coleman vs. Dan Severn
- Knockout of the Night: Vitor Belfort def. Scott Ferrozzo
- Submission of the Night: Mark Coleman def. Dan Severn

== See also ==
- Ultimate Fighting Championship
- List of UFC champions
- List of UFC events
- 1997 in UFC
