= Scott Ferrozzo =

American mixed martial artist

- Born: April 26, 1965 (age 61); Shakopee, Minnesota, United States
- Other names: The Pit Bull
- Height: 5 ft 11 in (1.80 m)
- Weight: 323 lb (147 kg; 23.1 st)
- Stance: Orthodox
- Fighting out of: Shakopee, Minnesota, United States
- Years active: 1996–1997

Mixed martial arts record
- Total: 6
- Wins: 4
- By knockout: 3
- By decision: 1
- Losses: 2
- By knockout: 1
- By submission: 1

Other information
- Mixed martial arts record from Sherdog

Scott Ferrozzo (born April 26, 1965) is an American retired mixed martial artist, who is perhaps best known for his fights in the early days of the Ultimate Fighting Championship. During his fighting career he participated in UFC 8, UFC 11, and UFC 12. Ferrozzo also happened to be managed by current UFC announcer Bruce Buffer.

== Career ==
Ferrozzo first participated in the Ultimate Fighting Championship at its UFC 8 event in 1996. He was offered that fight after video tapes of his participation in the Atlanta Pit Fights. He was defeated by Jerry Bohlander via submission in the first round of the UFC 8 tournament.

Ferrozo returned to the UFC seven months later at UFC 11, defeating Sam Fulton in an alternate bout prior to the start of the pay-per-view broadcast. By doing so, Ferrozzo secured a spot as an alternate on the card, which meant that if a fighter on the main card was unable to continue to the next round, Ferrozzo would be used as a substitute. He ended up replacing the man who defeated him at UFC 8, Jerry Bohlander, who was removed from the tournament due to injury. Ferrozzo stepped in and replaced him against Tank Abbott in the semi-finals. Ferrozzo was able to score a unanimous decision victory over Abbott to advance to the final round against the reigning UFC Champion Mark Coleman. However, Ferrozzo was unable to continue after defeating Abbott due to fatigue as well as a cut sustained in his previous bout. Coleman was declared the UFC 11 champion by way of forfeit.

Ferrozzo's last UFC appearance came at UFC 12 in 1997, participating in the heavyweight tournament. He defeated Jim Mullen in his first match of the night before losing to Vitor Belfort in the heavyweight finals. Following the loss to Belfort, Ferrozzo retired from MMA competition. Scott came out of retirement and lost a backyard match to Tank Abbott that went eighteen minutes. Much of the match was contested with Tank mounting and back mounting Ferrozzo, but unable to do major damage.

== Career accomplishments ==
=== Mixed martial arts ===
- Ultimate Fighting Championship
  - UFC Encyclopedia Awards
    - Fight of the Night (One time) vs. Tank Abbott

== Mixed martial arts record ==
Professional record breakdown
6 matches	4 wins	2 losses
By knockout	3	1
By submission	0	1
By decision	1	0

Res.	Record	Opponent	Method	Event	Date	Round	Time	Location	Notes
Loss	4–2	Vitor Belfort	TKO (punches)	UFC 12	February 7, 1997	1	0:43	Dothan, Alabama, United States	
Win	4–1	Jim Mullen	TKO (punches)	UFC 12	February 7, 1997	1	8:02	Dothan, Alabama, United States	
Win	3–1	Tank Abbott	Decision (unanimous)	UFC 11	September 20, 1996	1	15:00	Augusta, Georgia, United States	Withdrew from tournament due to fatigue.
Win	2–1	Sam Fulton	TKO (submission to punches)	UFC 11	September 20, 1996	1	9:00	Augusta, Georgia, United States	
Win	1–1	Steve Grinnow	KO (strikes)	Atlanta Fights	March 1, 1996	1	11:58	Atlanta, Georgia, United States	
Loss	0–1	Jerry Bohlander	Submission (guillotine choke)	UFC 8	February 16, 1996	1	9:03	San Juan, Puerto Rico	

== See also ==
- Tank Abbott
- Pit Fighting
