= UFC 13 =

UFC mixed martial arts event in 1997

UFC 13: The Ultimate Force
- The poster for UFC 13: The Ultimate Force
- Promotion: Ultimate Fighting Championship
- Date: May 30, 1997
- Venue: Augusta Civic Center
- City: Augusta, Georgia
- Attendance: 5,100

Event chronology
UFC 12: Judgement Day	UFC 13: The Ultimate Force	UFC 14: Showdown

UFC 13: The Ultimate Force was a mixed martial arts event held by the Ultimate Fighting Championship on May 30, 1997 in Augusta, Georgia. The event was seen live on pay-per-view in the United States, and later released on home video.

== History ==
UFC 13 featured two four man tournaments, a heavyweight tournament for fighters 200 lb or more, and a lightweight tournament for fighters under 200 lb, as well as two alternate bouts and a Superfight between Vitor Belfort and Tank Abbott.

This was the first appearance of two future UFC Champions and UFC Hall of Fame members Randy Couture and Tito Ortiz, who was an alternate in the lightweight tournament.

The show also featured the first and only UFC appearance of Tony Halme who had previously been a professional wrestler with World Wrestling Entertainment (then World Wrestling Federation) under the name of Ludvig Borga.

Bruce Buffer returned to announce the fights, after making his initial debut as an announcer at UFC 10.

This was the second UFC event to have two tournaments instead of one following UFC 12.

== Results ==
Lightweight Finals
Weight class				Method	Round	Time	Notes
Lightweight	Guy Mezger	def.	Tito Ortiz	Submission (guillotine choke)		3:00	(Note: Ortiz replaced Inoue who was unable to continue due to injury.)
Lightweight Semifinals
Lightweight	Guy Mezger	def.	Christophe Leininger	Decision (unanimous)		15:00
Lightweight	Enson Inoue	def.	Royce Alger	Submission (armbar)		1:36
Lightweight Alternate bout
Lightweight	Tito Ortiz	def.	Wes Albritton	TKO (corner stoppage)		0:31	(Note: This fight was shown on the PPV before the Mezger-Ortiz fight.)
Heavyweight Finals
Weight class				Method	Round	Time	Notes
Heavyweight	Randy Couture	def.	Steven Graham	TKO (punches)		3:13
Heavyweight Semifinals
Heavyweight	Steven Graham	def.	Dmitri Stepanov	Submission (armlock)		1:30
Heavyweight	Randy Couture	def.	Tony Halme	Submission (rear-naked choke)		1:00
Heavyweight Alternate bout
Heavyweight	Jack Nilson	def.	Saeed Hosseini	TKO (punches)		1:23
Heavyweight bout
Heavyweight	Vitor Belfort	def.	Tank Abbott	TKO (punches)		0:52

== UFC 13 Lightweight Tournament Bracket ==
Semifinals
Guy Mezger	DEC
Christophe Leininger	15:00
Enson Inoue	SUB
Royce Alger	1:36

Finals
(United States) Guy Mezger	SUB
(United States) Tito Ortiz^{1}	3:00

^{1} Tito Ortiz replaced Enson Inoue who withdrew due to injury.

== UFC 13 Heavyweight Tournament Bracket ==
Semifinals
Steven Graham	SUB
Dmitri Stepanov	1:30
Randy Couture	SUB
Tony Halme	0:56

Finals
Steven Graham	3:13
Randy Couture	TKO

== Encyclopedia awards ==
The following fighters were honored in the October 2011 book titled UFC Encyclopedia.

- Fight of the Night: Guy Mezger vs. Tito Ortiz
- Knockout of the Night: Vitor Belfort def. Tank Abbott
- Submission of the Night: Guy Mezger def. Tito Ortiz

== See also ==
- Ultimate Fighting Championship
- List of UFC champions
- List of UFC events
- 1997 in UFC
