= Amaury Bitetti =

Brazilian Jiu-Jitsu practitioner and mixed martial arts promoter

- Born: Brazil
- Nationality: Brazilian
- Height: 5 ft 9 in (175 cm)
- Weight: 185 lb (84 kg; 13 st 3 lb)
- Division: Middleweight
- Style: Brazilian Jiu-Jitsu
- Fighting out of: Rio de Janeiro, Brazil
- Team: Carlson Gracie Team
- Rank: 7th deg. BJJ coral belt
- Years active: 1995-2001 (MMA)

Mixed martial arts record
- Total: 7
- Wins: 5
- By knockout: 2
- By submission: 1
- By decision: 1
- By disqualification: 1
- Losses: 2
- By knockout: 2

Other information
- Mixed martial arts record from Sherdog

Amaury Bitetti is a Brazilian mixed martial arts former fighter and promoter holding the rank of 7th degree black and red coral belt in Brazilian jiu-jitsu (BJJ). Considered by many as one of the best BJJ competitors of all time, Bitetti is a two-time world jiu-jitsu champion in open weight, the first-ever to win the category, and a two-time Brazilian national champion. After competing in Vale Tudo / MMA Bitetti founded the MMA fight organization Bitetti Combate.

== Brazilian jiu-jitsu career ==
Bitetti trained under the late Carlson Gracie starting at age five at the Carlson Gracie Academy in Rio de Janeiro, Brazil.

He won the World Jiu-Jitsu Championship in the Absolute division in 1996 and 1997.

Bitetti went on to win the Brazilian National Jiu-Jitsu Championship in 1998 and 2000 in the -94 kg division, as well as a bronze medal at the World Jiu-Jitsu Championship in 1999.

== Mixed martial arts career ==
=== Desafio ===
Bitetti's first fight was going to be in the Desafio – Jiu Jitsu vs Luta Livre event in 1991, a challenge between Brazilian jiu-jitsu and Luta Livre fighters. He was originally escalated to face Luta Livre expert Marco Ruas, but Ruas ended up cancelling his participation and Bitetti was declared the winner by W.O.

Amaury had his debut in 1995 for the Desafio: International Vale Tudo tournament. Entering the competition representing the art of Brazilian jiu-jitsu, he was pitted at the first round against karate stylist Francisco Nonato, but he defeated him by taking the fight to the mat and raining punches on him.

Bitetti next defeated kickboxer James Adler the same way, and he advanced to the finals, where he faced capoeira fighter Mestre Hulk. The grappler waited after some spinning kicks and tried to shoot, but he was suddenly caught by a right hook from the capoeirista and fell to the ground, where he received fourteen unanswered punches until referee Joao Alberto Barreto stopped the match.

=== Ultimate Fighting Championship ===
In 1996, Bitetti debuted in Ultimate Fighting Championship at its event UFC 9, replacing an injured Marco Ruas in his fight against Don Frye. The match would become infamous for the amount of punishment Amaury received, as Frye stopped his early takedowns and started landing punches, knees and elbows on the Brazilian, both standing and on the ground. After a hard series of elbows to the spine and head, the referee stopped the match to declare Frye winner.

Amaury returned to UFC in UFC 26, where he faced Ken Shamrock trainee Alex Andrade. This time Bitetti started aggressively, but Andrade answered and followed with a kick to the face, which gained him a yellow card as he was wearing wrestling shoes and thus he couldn't legally kick. The Brazilian continued landing several combinations through the match, but he ended winning by disqualification instead, as at the second round he was kicked in the head again, which got Andrade out of the match.

=== After retirement ===
Bitetti was also in Antônio Rodrigo Nogueira's corner when Nogueira submitted Tim Sylvia to win the UFC Heavyweight Championship at UFC 81. He also holds a win over UFC veteran Dennis Hallman.

He founded his own mixed martial arts organization called Bitetti Combat in 2002. The company hosted its 14th event on 9 March 2013.

Bitetti stated that he wished to compete against Roberto Traven at the 2013 ADCC.

Bitetti was awarded his coral belt in May 2020 by master Osvaldo Alves after 31 years as a black belt

Bitetti is currently the Head Instructor at Gym Jitsu Allen in Allen, TX. He is teaching Jiu-Jitsu, MMA, and Muay Thai.

== Championships and accomplishments ==
=== Brazilian Jiu-Jitsu ===
- 2 x IBJJF World Champion (1996 / 1997)
- 3rd place IBJJF World Championship (1999)
- CBJJ Brazilian Nationals Championship (1998 / 2000)

=== Mixed martial arts ===
- Ultimate Fighting Championship
  - UFC Encyclopedia Awards
    - Fight of the Night (One time) vs. Don Frye
- Desafio
  - International Vale Tudo Tournament Finalist (1995)

== Mixed martial arts record ==
Professional record breakdown
7 matches	5 wins	2 losses
By knockout	2	2
By submission	1	0
By decision	1	0
By disqualification	1	0

Res.	Record	Opponent	Method	Event	Date	Round	Time	Location	Notes
Win	5–2	Dennis Hallman	Decision (split)	Shogun 1	15 December 2001	3	5:00	Honolulu, Hawaii, United States	
Win	4–2	Alex Andrade	DQ (kicking with shoes)	UFC 26	9 June 2000	2	0:43	Cedar Rapids, Iowa, United States	
Win	3–2	Maurice Travis	Submission (rear-naked choke)	Vale Tudo O Lutador	19 December 1996	1	3:17	Rio de Janeiro, Brazil	
Loss	2–2	Don Frye	TKO (punches)	UFC 9	17 May 1996	1	9:22	Detroit, Michigan, United States	
Loss	2–1	Mestre Hulk	KO (punches)	Desafio: International Vale Tudo	5 January 1995	1	0:23	Brazil	Tournament finals
Win	2–0	James Adler	TKO (submission to punches)	Desafio: International Vale Tudo	5 January 1995	1	1:51	Brazil	Tournament semifinals
Win	1–0	Nonato Nonato	TKO (submission to punches)	Desafio: International Vale Tudo	5 January 1995	1	3:57	Brazil	Tournament quarterfinals
