= List of UFC encyclopedia award recipients =

The UFC Encyclopedia Awards refer to three unofficial performance-based award categories compiled by the late Thomas Gerbasi, former editorial director of UFC/Zuffa LLC and senior editor of UFC.com. These awards were featured in Gerbasi's officially licensed 400-page publication, "UFC Encyclopedia: The Definitive Guide to the Ultimate Fighting Championship", released in October 2011. The awards recognize standout performances from UFC events held prior to the implementation of the official UFC Bonus Awards system in January 2006.

The first documented instance of the UFC Bonus Awards, where fighters received formal cash bonuses, occurred on January 16, 2006, at Ultimate Fight Night 3. Gerbasi's encyclopedia reviewed 63 events preceding this date, as well as select subsequent events that did not include bonus awards. Within this context, the book highlights both the unofficial performance recognitions and the early iterations of the official UFC Bonus Awards.

The following categories were documented:

- Fight of the Night: Presented to the two fighters who delivered the most compelling and entertaining bout on the event card.
- Knockout of the Night: Awarded to the fighter who achieved the most impressive knockout or technical knockout.
- Submission of the Night: Given to the fighter who executed the most notable submission victory.
Notes:
- For early UFC events featuring tournament formats, opponent information (denoted as "def.") is included only when relevant, due to fighters competing in multiple bouts within a single event.
- The first officially recognized Fight of the Night bonus was awarded at Ultimate Fight Night 3 on January 16, 2006. From that event through The Ultimate Fighter 3 Finale, unless otherwise specified as "unofficial," all listed bonuses are considered official and correspond with those documented on the UFC Bonus Awards page.

== Award recipients ==
#	Event	Date	Fight of the Night			Knockout of the Night	Submission of the Night	Ref.
70	UFC Fight Night 7	Dec 13, 2006	Karo Parisyan	vs.	Drew Fickett (unofficial)	Alan Belcher (unofficial)	—	
69	The Ultimate Fighter 3 Finale	Jun 24, 2006	Kendall Grove	vs.	Ed Herman	Michael Bisping (unofficial)	Rory Singer	
68	UFC 60: Hughes vs. Gracie	May 27, 2006	Spencer Fisher (unofficial)	vs.	Matt Wiman (unofficial)	Melvin Guillard (unofficial)	Mike Swick (unofficial)	
67	UFC 59: Reality Check	Apr 15, 2006	Tito Ortiz	vs.	Forrest Griffin	Tim Sylvia (unofficial)	Evan Tanner (unofficial)	
66	Ultimate Fight Night 4	Apr 6, 2006	Josh Neer (unofficial)	vs.	Joe Stevenson (unofficial)	—	Josh Koscheck (unofficial)	
65	UFC 58: USA vs. Canada	Mar 4, 2006	Rich Franklin (unofficial)	vs.	David Loiseau (unofficial)	Tom Murphy (unofficial) (Note: Not listed in source. As per author Thomas Gerbasi.)	Mark Hominick (unofficial)	
65	UFC 58: USA vs. Canada	Mar 4, 2006	Georges St-Pierre (unofficial)	vs.	B.J. Penn (unofficial)	Tom Murphy (unofficial)	Mark Hominick (unofficial)	
64	UFC 57: Liddell vs. Couture 3	Feb 4, 2006	Chuck Liddell (unofficial)	vs.	Randy Couture (unofficial)	Chuck Liddell (unofficial)	Jeff Monson (unofficial)	
64	Ultimate Fight Night 3	Jan 16, 2006	Josh Neer	vs.	Melvin Guillard (Note: This is the first official Post-Fight bonus award. Subsequent awards are official unless noted otherwise.)	Chris Leben (unofficial)	Jason Von Flue (unofficial)	
63	UFC 56: Full Force	Nov 19, 2005	Rich Franklin	vs.	Nate Quarry	Rich Franklin	Matt Hughes	
62	The Ultimate Fighter 2 Finale	Nov 5, 2005	Rashad Evans	vs.	Brad Imes	Josh Burkman	Kenny Florian	
61	UFC 55: Fury	Oct 7, 2005	Forrest Griffin	vs.	Elvis Sinosic	Andrei Arlovski	Renato Sobral	
60	Ultimate Fight Night 2	Oct 3, 2005	David Loiseau	vs.	Evan Tanner	Brandon Vera	Drew Fickett	
59	UFC 54: Boiling Point	Aug 20, 2005	Chuck Liddell	vs.	Jeremy Horn	James Irvin	Randy Couture	
58	UFC Fight Night 1	Aug 6, 2005	Chris Leben	vs.	Patrick Côté	Mike Swick	Josh Koscheck	
57	UFC 53: Heavy Hitters	Jun 5, 2005	Rich Franklin	vs.	Evan Tanner	David Loiseau	Paul Buentello	
56	UFC 52: Couture vs. Liddell 2	Apr 16, 2005	Matt Hughes	vs.	Frank Trigg	Chuck Liddell	Matt Hughes	
55	The Ultimate Fighter 1 Finale	Apr 9, 2005	Forrest Griffin	vs.	Stephan Bonnar	Josh Koscheck	—	
54	UFC 51: Super Saturday	Oct 22, 2004	Tito Ortiz	vs.	Vitor Belfort	Evan Tanner	Andrei Arlovski	
53	UFC 50: The War of '04	Oct 22, 2004	Frank Trigg	vs.	Renato Verissimo	Travis Lutter	Matt Hughes	
53	UFC 49: Unfinished Business	Aug 21, 2004	Chuck Liddell	vs.	Vernon White	David Terrell	Chris Lytle	
53	UFC 48: Payback	Jun 19, 2004	Evan Tanner	vs.	Phil Baroni	Georges St-Pierre	Frank Mir	
52	UFC 47: It's On!	Apr 2, 2004	Chuck Liddell	vs.	Tito Ortiz	Nick Diaz	Genki Sudo	
51	UFC 46: Supernatural	Jan 31, 2004	Georges St-Pierre	vs.	Karo Parisyan	Frank Mir	B.J. Penn	
50	UFC 45: Revolution	Nov 21, 2003	Evan Tanner	vs.	Phil Baroni	Evan Tanner	Matt Hughes	
49	UFC 44: Undisputed	Sep 26, 2003	Randy Couture	vs.	Tito Ortiz	Andrei Arlovski	Nick Diaz	
48	UFC 43: Meltdown	Jun 6, 2003	Randy Couture	vs.	Chuck Liddell	Vitor Belfort	Kimo Leopoldo	
47	UFC 42: Sudden Impact	Apr 25, 2003	Matt Hughes	vs.	Sean Sherk	David Loiseau	—	
46	UFC 41: Onslaught	Feb 28, 2003	Matt Lindland	vs.	Phil Baroni	Tim Sylvia	Frank Mir	
45	UFC 40: Vendetta	Nov 22, 2002	Tito Ortiz	vs.	Ken Shamrock	Chuck Liddell	Carlos Newton	
44	UFC 39: The Warriors Return	Sep 27, 2002	Ricco Rodriguez	vs.	Randy Couture	Phil Baroni	—	
43	UFC 38: Brawl at the Hall	Jul 13, 2002	Ian Freeman	vs.	Frank Mir	Mark Weir	Genki Sudo	
42	UFC 37.5: As Real As It Gets	Jun 22, 2002	Chuck Liddell	vs.	Vitor Belfort	Robbie Lawler	Pete Spratt	
41	UFC 37: High Impact	May 11, 2002	Robbie Lawler	vs.	Aaron Riley	Ricco Rodriguez	Murilo Bustamante	
40	UFC 36: Worlds Collide	Mar 22, 2002	Josh Barnett	vs.	Randy Couture	Pedro Rizzo	Frank Mir	
39	UFC 35: Throwdown	Jan 11, 2002	Jens Pulver	vs.	B.J. Penn	Murilo Bustamante	Eugene Jackson	
38	UFC 34: High Voltage	Nov 1, 2001	Matt Lindland	vs.	Phil Baroni	Matt Hughes & B.J. Penn	Frank Mir	
37	UFC 33: Victory in Vegas	Sep 28, 2001	Matt Serra	vs.	Yves Edwards	Jutaro Nakao	Ricardo Almeida	
36	UFC 32: Showdown in the Meadowlands	Jun 29, 2001	Ricco Rodriguez	vs.	Andrei Arlovski	Pat Miletich	Josh Barnett	
35	UFC 31: Locked and Loaded	May 4, 2001	Randy Couture	vs.	Pedro Rizzo	Shonie Carter	Carlos Newton	
34	UFC 30: Battle on the Boardwalk	Feb 23, 2001	Pedro Rizzo	vs.	Josh Barnett	Tito Ortiz	Elvis Sinosic	
33	UFC 29: Defense of the Belts	Dec 16, 2000	Tito Ortiz	vs.	Yuki Kondo	Fabiano Iha	Dennis Hallman	
32	UFC 28: High Stakes	Nov 17, 2000	Randy Couture	vs.	Kevin Randleman	Jens Pulver	Andrei Arlovski	
31	UFC 27: Ultimate Bad Boyz	Sep 22, 2000	—			Yuki Kondo	Fabiano Iha	
30	UFC 26: Ultimate Field of Dreams	Jun 9, 2000	—			—	Pat Miletich	
29	UFC 25: Ultimate Japan 3	Apr 14, 2000	Tito Ortiz	vs.	Wanderlei Silva	Ikuhisa Minowa	Murilo Bustamante	
28	UFC 24: First Defense	Mar 10, 2000	Bob Cook	vs.	Tiki Ghosn	Lance Gibson	Scott Adams	
27	UFC 23: Ultimate Japan 2	Nov 19, 1999	Eugene Jackson	vs.	Keiichiro Yamamiya	Pedro Rizzo def. Tsuyoshi Kosaka (Note: Final UFC event with a tournament held in one evening.)	—	
26	UFC 22: Only One Can be Champion	Sep 24, 1999	Frank Shamrock	vs.	Tito Ortiz	Brad Kohler	Jeremy Horn	
25	UFC 21: Return of the Champions	Jul 16, 1999	Andre Roberts	vs.	Ron Waterman	Eugene Jackson	Paul Jones	
24	UFC 20: Battle for the Gold	May 7, 1999	Pedro Rizzo	vs.	Tra Telligman	Wanderlei Silva	Pete Williams	
23	UFC 19: Ultimate Young Guns	Mar 5, 1999	Jeremy Horn	vs.	Chuck Liddell	Tito Ortiz	Jeremy Horn	
22	UFC 18: The Road to the Heavyweight Title	Jan 8, 1999	Bas Rutten	vs.	Tsuyoshi Kosaka	—	Evan Tanner	
21	UFC Ultimate Brazil	Oct 16, 1998	Frank Shamrock	vs.	John Lober	Vitor Belfort (Note: First UFC event (other than UFC 9) to not utilize the tournament format which, aside from UFC 23, was abandoned completely in following events.)	Ebenezer Fontes Braga	
20	UFC 17: Redemption	May 15, 1998	Dan Henderson	vs.	Carlos Newton	Pete Williams def. Mark Coleman	Carlos Newton def. Bob Gilstrap	
19	UFC 16: Battle in the Bayou	Mar 13, 1998	Tsuyoshi Kohsaka	vs.	Kimo Leopoldo	Frank Shamrock def. Igor Zinoviev	Jerry Bohlander def. Kevin Jackson	
18	UFC: Ultimate Japan	Oct 17, 1997	Kazushi Sakuraba	vs.	Marcus Silveira	—	Frank Shamrock def. Kevin Jackson	
17	UFC 15: Collision Course	Oct 17, 1997	Randy Couture	vs.	Vitor Belfort	Mark Kerr def. Greg Stott	Mark Kerr def. Dwayne Cason	
16	UFC 14: Showdown	Jul 27, 1997	Maurice Smith	vs.	Mark Coleman	Mark Kerr def. Moti Horenstein	Kevin Jackson def. Tony Fryklund	
15	UFC 13: The Ultimate Force	May 30, 1997	Guy Mezger	vs.	Tito Ortiz	Vitor Belfort def. Tank Abbott	Guy Mezger def. Tito Ortiz	
14	UFC 12: Judgement Day	Feb 7, 1997	Mark Coleman	vs.	Dan Severn	Vitor Belfort def. Scott Ferrozzo	Mark Coleman def. Dan Severn	
13	Ultimate Ultimate 1996	Dec 7, 1996	Don Frye	vs.	Tank Abbott	Kimo Leopoldo def. Paul Varelans	Don Frye def. Mark Hall	
12	UFC 11: The Proving Ground	Sep 19, 1996	Scott Ferrozzo	vs.	Tank Abbott	Brian Johnston def. Reza Nasri	Mark Coleman def. Julian Sanchez	
11	UFC 10: The Tournament	Jul 12, 1996	Mark Coleman	vs.	Don Frye	Mark Coleman def. Moti Horenstein	—	
10	UFC 9: Motor City Madness	May 17, 1996	Don Frye	vs.	Amaury Bitetti	Mark Hall (Note: First UFC event to not utilize the tournament format. The format was brought back at the next event (UFC 10) and used until UFC 17.)	—	
9	UFC 8: David vs. Goliath	Feb 16, 1996	Gary Goodridge	vs.	Jerry Bohlander	Gary Goodridge def. Paul Herrera	Jerry Bohlander def. Scott Ferrozzo	
8	Ultimate Ultimate 1995	Dec 16, 1995	Dan Severn	vs.	Paul Varelans	—	Oleg Taktarov def. Dave Beneteau	
7	UFC 7: The Brawl in Buffalo	Sep 8, 1995	Marco Ruas	vs.	Paul Varelans	—	Marco Ruas def. Larry Cureton	
6	UFC 6: Clash of the Titans	Jul 14, 1995	Oleg Taktarov	vs.	Tank Abbott	Tank Abbott def. John Matua	Ken Shamrock def. Dan Severn	
5	UFC 5: The Return of the Beast	Apr 7, 1995	Oleg Taktarov	vs.	Ernie Verdicia	Jon Hess def. Andy Anderson	Oleg Taktarov def. Ernie Verdicia	
4	UFC 4: Revenge of the Warriors	Dec 16, 1994	Royce Gracie	vs.	Dan Severn	Marcus Bossett def. Eldo Dias Xavier	Royce Gracie def. Dan Severn	
3	UFC 3: The American Dream	Sep 9, 1994	Royce Gracie	vs.	Kimo Leopoldo	Keith Hackney def. Emmanuel Yarbrough	Royce Gracie def. Kimo Leopoldo	
2	UFC 2: No Way Out	Mar 11, 1994	Royce Gracie	vs.	Minoki Ichihara	Patrick Smith def. Scott Morris	Royce Gracie def. Remco Pardoel	
1	UFC 1: The Beginning	Nov 12, 1993	Royce Gracie	vs.	Ken Shamrock	Gerard Gordeau def. Teila Tuli	Royce Gracie def. Gerard Gordeau	

== Fighters with the most awards ==
This list includes recipients with six or more awards.

Fighter	Fight of the Night	Knockout of the Night	Submission of the Night	Total
Tito Ortiz	8	2	0	10
Chuck Liddell	7	3	0	10
Randy Couture	8	0	1	9
Royce Gracie	4	0	4	8
Evan Tanner	4	2	2	8
Vitor Belfort	3	4	0	7
Matt Hughes	2	1	4	7
Frank Mir	1	1	4	6

== See also ==
- List of UFC bonus award recipients
- List of WEC bonus award recipients
- List of UFC events
- List of male mixed martial artists
