= Sam Adkins (fighter) =

American MMA fighter

- Born: April 28, 1965 (age 61); United States
- Other names: The Experience
- Nationality: American
- Height: 6 ft 3 in (1.91 m)
- Weight: 225 lb (102 kg; 16.1 st)
- Division: Heavyweight
- Years active: 1996 - 2007

Mixed martial arts record
- Total: 29
- Wins: 7
- By knockout: 1
- By submission: 4
- By decision: 2
- Losses: 20
- By knockout: 6
- By submission: 9
- By decision: 5
- Draws: 2

Other information
- Mixed martial arts record from Sherdog

Sam Adkins (born April 26, 1965) is a retired American mixed martial artist. He is best known for his time in the UFC competing in the Heavyweight division fighting established fighters such as Ken Shamrock and Tank Abbott.

== Mixed martial arts record ==
Professional record breakdown
29 matches	7 wins	20 losses
By knockout	1	6
By submission	4	9
By decision	2	5
Draws	2	

Res.	Record	Opponent	Method	Event	Date	Round	Time	Location	Notes
Loss	7–20–2	George Paz	TKO	REF: Renegades Extreme Fighting	October 20, 2007	2	0:58	Houston, Texas, United States	
Loss	7–19–2	Jesse Vasquez	Decision (unanimous)	REF: Renegades Extreme Fighting	June 17, 2006	3	5:00	Houston, Texas, United States	
Loss	7–18–2	Eric Loveless	Decision (unanimous)	REF: Renegades Extreme Fighting	March 25, 2006	3	5:00	Houston, Texas, United States	
Win	7–17–2	Jesse Vasquez	Submission	REF: Renegades Extreme Fighting	January 21, 2006	2	0:33	Houston, Texas, United States	
Loss	6–17–2	Kristian Rothaermel	TKO (punches)	FFC 7: Freestyle Fighting Championships 7	December 19, 2003	1	2:51	Biloxi, Mississippi, United States	
Draw	6–16–2	Luis Garcia	Draw	REF: Renegades Extreme Fighting	February 1, 2003	3	5:00	Houston, Texas, United States	
Win	6–16–1	Elias Siam	Decision (unanimous)	REF: Renegades Extreme Fighting	February 1, 2003	3	5:00	Houston, Texas, United States	
Loss	5–16–1	Edwin Dewees	Decision (unanimous)	RITC 39: Bring It	October 19, 2002	3	3:00	Phoenix, Arizona, United States	
Loss	5–15–1	Robert Villegas	Submission (heel hook)	REF: Renegades Extreme Fighting	October 12, 2002	3	1:30	Houston, Texas, United States	
Loss	5–14–1	Homer Moore	Decision	CLM 3: Combate Libre Mexico 3	September 20, 2002	4	5:00	Mexico	
Loss	5–13–1	Tyrone Roberts	Decision	Dangerzone 13: Caged Heat	April 13, 2002	2	6:00	Texas, United States	
Draw	5–12–1	Luis Garcia	Draw	REF: Renegades Extreme Fighting	November 17, 2001	0	0:00		
Loss	5–12	Ken Shamrock	Submission (kimura)	WMMAA 1: MegaFights	August 10, 2001	1	1:26	Atlantic City, New Jersey, United States	
Loss	5–11	Guy Mezger	Submission	FFC: Freestyle Fighting Championship	November 18, 2000	1	2:11	Dallas, Texas, United States	
Loss	5–10	Bobby Hoffman	TKO (doctor stoppage)	EC 35: Extreme Challenge 35	June 29, 2000	1	2:25	Davenport, Iowa, United States	
Loss	5–9	Ricco Rodriguez	Submission (forearm choke)	Armageddon: Armageddon 2	November 23, 1999	1	4:32	Houston, Texas, United States	
Win	5–8	Mark Walker	Submission (armbar)	BRI 5: Bas Rutten Invitational 5	October 16, 1999	1	6:07	Colorado, United States	
Loss	4–8	Gan McGee	TKO (punches)	BRI 4: Bas Rutten Invitational 4	August 14, 1999	1	4:58		
Win	4–7	Brett Hogg	Submission (keylock)	Kickfest: Kickfest 1	April 3, 1999	1	1:44	Cedar Falls, Iowa, United States	
Loss	3–7	Dan Severn	Submission (fatigue)	IFC 8: Showdown at Shooting Star	June 20, 1998	1	12:53	Mahnomen, Minnesota, United States	
Loss	3–6	Kevin Jackson	Submission (armbar)	EC 18: Extreme Challenge 18	May 15, 1998	1	4:21	Davenport, Iowa, United States	
Loss	3–5	Travis Fulton	Submission (armbar)	RnB 2: Bare Knuckle Brawl	February 20, 1998	1	0:45	Atlanta, Georgia, United States	
Win	3–4	Clayton Miller	Submission (guillotine choke)	RnB 2: Bare Knuckle Brawl	February 20, 1998	1	0:26	Atlanta, Georgia, United States	
Loss	2–4	Andre Roberts	Submission	EC 11: Extreme Challenge 11	November 22, 1997	1	4:02	Marshalltown, Iowa, United States	
Loss	2–3	Brad Kohler	TKO (cut)	EC 9: Extreme Challenge 9	August 30, 1997	1	6:56	Davenport, Iowa, United States	
Loss	2–2	David Abbott	Submission (neck crank)	UFC 11	September 20, 1996	1	2:06	Augusta, Georgia, United States	
Win	2–1	Felix Mitchell	Decision (unanimous)	UFC 10	July 12, 1996	1	10:00	Birmingham, Alabama, United States	
Loss	1–1	Don Frye	TKO (doctor stoppage)	UFC 8	February 16, 1996	1	0:48	Bayamón, Puerto Rico	
Win	1–0	Keith Mielke	TKO (submission to punches)	UFC 8	February 16, 1996	1	0:50	Bayamón, Puerto Rico	

== See also ==
- List of male mixed martial artists
