= UFC 11 =

UFC mixed martial arts event in 1996

UFC 11: The Proving Ground
- The poster for UFC 11: The Proving Ground
- Promotion: Ultimate Fighting Championship
- Date: September 20, 1996
- Venue: Augusta Civic Center
- City: Augusta, Georgia
- Attendance: 4,500
- Buyrate: 92,000

Event chronology
UFC 10: The Tournament	UFC 11: The Proving Ground	Ultimate Ultimate 1996

UFC 11: The Proving Ground was a mixed martial arts event held by the Ultimate Fighting Championship on September 20, 1996, at the Augusta Civic Center in Augusta, Georgia. The event was broadcast live on pay-per-view in the United States, and later released on home video.

== History ==
The card featured an eight-man tournament, as well as two alternate bouts in case of an injury, and to fill time for the pay-per-view broadcast.

Due to multiple injuries and fatigue, no alternates were able to continue after their semifinal matches.

Roberto Traven had a broken hand after his alternate match and the championship was won by forfeit.

Rich Goins returned as the ring announcer.

The event, with only a buyrate of 92,000, was one of the least purchased UFC events.

This was the first and only UFC tournament to end by default.

Due to Mark Coleman winning by default, and the vast number of short matches, the PPV has been called "Incomplete" and "disorganised" by viewers.

Igor Vovchanchyn was invited to fight at UFC 11, but could not participate due to visa issues as well as dissatisfaction with the offer.

== Results ==
Finals
Weight class				Method	Round	Time	Notes
N/A	Mark Coleman	def.	Scott Ferrozzo	Walkover (injury)			(Note: With Scott Ferrozzo injured, and all alternates injured or unable to continue, Mark Coleman wins the UFC 11 Tournament by default.)
Semifinals
N/A	Mark Coleman	def.	Brian Johnston	TKO (submission to strikes)		2:20
N/A	Scott Ferrozzo	def.	Tank Abbott	Decision (unanimous)		18:00	(Note: Ferrozzo replaced Bohlander, who was unable to continue in the tournament. Due to fatigue and a cut above his eye, Ferrozzo was unable to continue in the tournament.)
Quarterfinals
N/A	Mark Coleman	def.	Julian Sanchez	Submission (scarf hold choke)		0:45
N/A	Brian Johnston	def.	Reza Nasri	TKO (strikes)		0:28
N/A	Tank Abbott	def.	Sam Adkins	Submission (forearm choke)		2:06
N/A	Jerry Bohlander	def.	Fábio Gurgel	Decision (unanimous)		15:00
Alternate bouts
N/A	Scott Ferrozzo	def.	Sam Fulton	TKO (submission to strikes)		1:45
N/A	Roberto Traven	def.	Dave Berry	TKO (submission to strikes)		1:23	(Note: Traven was injured, and unable to continue as an alternate for the tournament.)

== UFC 11 bracket ==
Quarterfinals
(United States) Mark Coleman	SUB
(United States) Julian Sanchez	0:45
(United States) Brian Johnston	TKO
(United States) Reza Nasri	0:28
(United States) Tank Abbott	SUB
(United States) Sam Adkins	2:06
(United States) Jerry Bohlander	DEC
(Brazil) Fabio Gurgel	15:00

Semifinals
(United States) Mark Coleman	SUB
(United States) Brian Johnston	2:20
(United States) Tank Abbott	18:00
(United States) Scott Ferrozzo ^{1}	DEC

Finals
(United States) Mark Coleman ^{2}	W/O
(United States) Scott Ferrozzo	N/A

^{1}Jerry Bohlander withdrew due to injury. He was replaced by Scott Ferrozzo.
^{2} Scott Ferrozzo was unable to continue due to exhaustion, making Mark Coleman winner by walkover.

== Encyclopedia awards ==
The following fighters were honored in the October 2011 book titled UFC Encyclopedia.

- Fight of the Night: Scott Ferrozzo vs. Tank Abbott
- Knockout of the Night: Brian Johnston def. Reza Nasri
- Submission of the Night: Mark Coleman def. Julian Sanchez

== See also ==
- Ultimate Fighting Championship
- List of UFC champions
- List of UFC events
- 1996 in UFC
