= Just Another Romantic Wrestling Comedy =

- DVD cover
- Directed by: Kim Sky; Evan Seplow
- Written by: Kim Sky
- Produced by: Kim Sky; Dariusz Uczkowski; Ken Yasuda
- Starring: April Hunter; Aaron Fiore; Joanie Laurer; Don Frye
- Cinematography: Evan Seplow
- Edited by: Jazzmyn Banks
- Distributed by: Uczkowski Productions; Victory Multimedia
- Release date: December 1, 2006
- Running time: 105 minutes
- Country: United States
- Language: English

Just Another Romantic Wrestling Comedy is a 2006 film starring April Hunter and Joanie Laurer. This romantic comedy was premiered at New Jersey and New York City on December 1, 2006 and was released on DVD in the United States and the United Kingdom on April 17, 2007. After the film's DVD release Just Another Romantic Wrestling Comedy won an Honorable Mention award at the New Jersey International Festival awards. The release was handled by Victory Multimedia.

== Plot ==
The film is about a Jewish man named Marty Shalom Weinstein (Fiore) who falls in love with a wrestling princess Sandy and it's a "no holds barred" quest for her love, the Jewish man finds he has to fight for his love as Sandy's dad is also a wrestler who only wants his daughter to marry a famous wrestler, and not a Jewish man with little money and no muscles. Robert also has to deal with Roxanne (Laurer) and Jennie (Marshall) along with others out to get him.

== Cast ==
- Selassie Amana - Robert John
- Joanie Laurer - Roxanne
- April Hunter - Diamond Piedra
- Nicole Brier - Sandy Piedra
- Don Frye - Rocco Piedra
- Aaron Fiore - Marty Shalom Weinstein
- Renoly Santiago - Scorpio
- Sal Vulcano - Pinky
- Russ Newman - Broadcaster Russ
- Brooke Hogan - Nurse

== Reception ==
Critical reception for the movie was negative, with the only review on Rotten Tomatoes calling it "Just another bad movie." Wrestling reviewer Brian Zane called the film "without a doubt the absolute worst movie I have ever seen. Ever".
