= Roberto Traven =

Brazilian grappler and mixed martial arts fighter

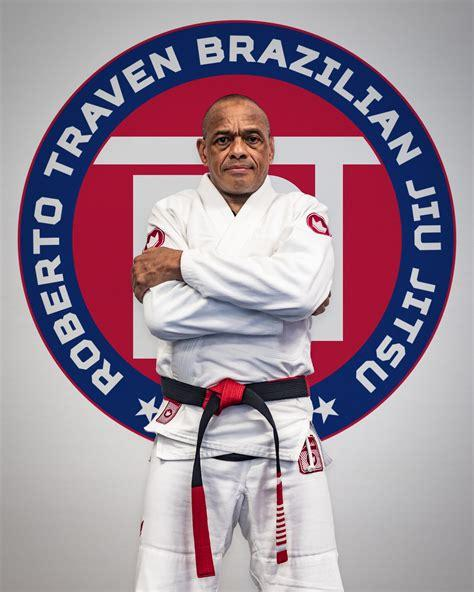
- Born: Roberto Traven; September 16, 1968 (age 58); Rio de Janeiro, Brazil
- Other names: Spider
- Height: 6 ft 3 in (1.91 m)
- Weight: 205 lb (93 kg; 14.6 st)
- Division: Heavyweight
- Style: Brazilian jiu-jitsu
- Team: Roberto Traven BJJ
- Rank: 7th deg. BJJ coral belt

Mixed martial arts record
- Total: 11
- Wins: 6
- By knockout: 2
- By submission: 2
- By decision: 2
- Losses: 4
- By knockout: 2
- By submission: 1
- By decision: 1
- Draws: 1

Other information
- Mixed martial arts record from Sherdog

Roberto "Spider" Traven (born September 16, 1968) is a Brazilian former mixed martial artist and Brazilian Jiu-Jitsu (BJJ) Coral Belt practitioner. He is a former ADCC Absolute Champion, IBJJF World Champion, and UFC veteran. Traven is widely regarded as one of the most influential figures in the global BJJ community, known for both his competitive achievements and his coaching legacy.

== Early life and Brazilian jiu-jitsu career ==
Traven was born in Rio de Janeiro, Brazil, and began training in Brazilian Jiu-Jitsu at the age of 16 under Romero "Jacaré" Cavalcanti, founder of Alliance Jiu-Jitsu. He earned his black belt in just four years, training alongside future legends such as Fábio Gurgel, Léo Vieira, and Eduardo "Jamelão" da Conceição. His natural talent and dedication led him to train three times a day, enabling him to quickly rise through the ranks. He was promoted to Corel Belt (7th degree black) on July 10, 2021. There are only approximately 50 to 60 living BJJ coral belts worldwide.

== Competitive achievements ==
- First Place - Brazilian National Championship - 1995
- First Place - Brazilian Team Championship - 1995
- First Place - Brazilian Team Championship – 1996
- First Place - AFC Russia Ultimate Fighting – 1997
- First Place - World Jiu-Jitsu Championship – 1998
- First Place - open class in the ADCC Submission Wrestling World Championship (grappling) – 1999
- First Place - Brazilian Team Championship – 1999
- First Place - World Jiu-Jitsu Championship – 1999
- First Place - Rings Japan – 2000
- Second Place - Super fight in the ADCC Submission Wrestling World Championship (grappling) – 2000
- Second Place - Masters World Championship– 2002
- First Place - Master's World Cup super heavy-weight – 2002
- First Place - Master's World Cup open class – 2002
- First Place - Master's World Cup heavyweight – 2003
- First Place - Pan Ams open and super heavy weight division (class Senior I) - 2006
- First Place - Pan American Senior II Heavy Weight division - 2010
- Third Place - ADCC Trials New Jersey Adult division - 2011
- First Place - World Master Jiu-Jitsu IBJJF Championship Heavy Weight Division (class Master IV) - 2014
- First Place - Pan Ams open and super heavy weight division (class Master IV) - 2015
- First Place - World Master Jiu-Jitsu IBJJF Championship Heavy Weight Division (class Master IV) - 2016
- First Place - IBJJF World No-Gi Championship - 2024

== Mixed martial arts career ==
Traven made his MMA debut at UFC 11 in 1996, defeating Dave Berry by TKO. He later faced Frank Mir at UFC 34, losing via armbar in the first round. His professional MMA record stands at 6 wins, 4 losses, and 1 draw, with victories in promotions such as UFC, Rings, and IAFC.

== Mixed martial arts record ==
Professional record breakdown
11 matches	6 wins	4 losses
By knockout	2	2
By submission	2	1
By decision	2	1
Draws	1	

Res.	Record	Opponent	Method	Event	Date	Round	Time	Location	Notes
Loss	6–4–1	John Salter	KO (punches)	Adrenaline MMA 3	June 13, 2009	1	2:15	Birmingham, Alabama, United States	
Draw	6–3–1	Yukiya Naito	Draw	Warriors Realm 3	March 15, 2005	3	5:00	Brisbane, Australia	
Loss	6–3	Elvis Sinosic	KO (punch)	Warriors Realm 1	September 3, 2004	2	0:35	Queensland, Australia	
Loss	6–2	Frank Mir	Submission (armbar)	UFC 34	November 2, 2001	1	1:05	Las Vegas, Nevada	
Loss	6–1	Dave Menne	Decision (unanimous)	Rings: King of Kings 2000 Block A	October 9, 2000	3	5:00	Tokyo, Japan	
Win	6–0	Mikhail Borissov	Decision (unanimous)	Rings: King of Kings 2000 Block A	October 9, 2000	2	5:00	Tokyo, Japan	
Win	5–0	Gueorguiev Tzvetkov	Decision (majority)	Rings: Millennium Combine 2	June 15, 2000	2	5:00	Tokyo, Japan	
Win	4–0	Maxim Tarasov	Submission (rear-naked choke)	Absolute Fighting Championship 2	April 30, 1997	1	2:47	Moscow, Russia	Won IAFC 2 Day 1 Tournament
Win	3–0	Leonid Efremov	TKO (submission to punches)	Absolute Fighting Championship 2	April 30, 1997	1	2:54	Moscow, Russia	
Win	2–0	Artyom Vilgulevsky	Submission (rear-naked choke)	Absolute Fighting Championship 2	April 30, 1997	1	2:28	Moscow, Russia	
Win	1–0	Dave Berry	TKO (submission to strikes)	UFC 11	September 20, 1996	1	1:23	Augusta, Georgia, United States	

== Grappling record ==
Result	Opponent	Method	Event	Gi/No-Gi	Date	Notes
Loss	Jefferson Moura	Submission (Triangle)	World Jiu-Jitsu Championship (Mundials) - -94 kg Division semi finals	Gi	2003	
Win	Charles Faria	Points	World Jiu-Jitsu Championship (Mundials) - -94 kg Division first round	Gi	2003	
Loss	Tom Erickson	N/A	ADCC Submission Wrestling World Championship - +99 kg first round	No-Gi	2001	
Loss	Mario Cruz	Points	ADCC Submission Wrestling World Championship - Absolute Division first round	No-Gi	2001	
Loss	Mario Sperry	Points	ADCC Submission Wrestling World Championship - Super Fight	No-Gi	2000	Silver in ADCC Super Fight
Win	Hayato Sakurai	Points (2x0)	ADCC Submission Wrestling World Championship - Absolute Division finals	No-Gi	1999	Wins Gold in Absolute
Win	Garth Taylor	Points (5x0)	ADCC Submission Wrestling World Championship - Absolute Division semi finals	No-Gi	1999	
Win	Luis Roberto	Points (6x0)	ADCC Submission Wrestling World Championship - Absolute Division quarter finals	No-Gi	1999	
Win	Fabiano Capoane	Points (2x0)	ADCC Submission Wrestling World Championship - Absolute Division first round	No-Gi	1999	
Loss	Jeff Monson	Points (0x3)	ADCC Submission Wrestling World Championship - +99 kg Division semi finals	No-Gi	1999	
Win	Jurie Rachel	Submission	ADCC Submission Wrestling World Championship - +99 kg Division first round	No-Gi	1999	
Win	Andre Marques	N/A	World Jiu-Jitsu Championship (Mundials) - +100 kg Division semi finals/ finals	Gi	1999	Wins Second Gold
Win	Minotauro Nogueira	Points	World Jiu-Jitsu Championship (Mundials) - +100 kg Division quarter finals	Gi	1999	
Win	John Machado	Points (10x0)	World Jiu-Jitsu Championship (Mundials) - +100 kg Division finals	Gi	1998	Wins First Gold
Win	Otavio Duarte	Penalty	World Jiu-Jitsu Championship (Mundials) - +100 kg Division semi finals	Gi	1998	
Win	Roberto Godoi	N/A	World Jiu-Jitsu Championship (Mundials) - +100 kg Division quarter finals	Gi	1998	

Notable Black Belts Associated with Roberto Traven

- Muzio de Angelis – One of Traven’s earliest students and later his business partner in Brazil.
- Jared Dopp – High-level competitor and ADCC veteran, known to have trained under Traven at various points.
- Raphael Assunção – UFC veteran and BJJ black belt under Traven.
- Jeff Joslin – Canadian BJJ black belt and MMA fighter, trained under Traven.
- Carlos David Oliveira - 5th degree black belt in Brazilian Jiu Jitsu, under Roberto Traven.
- Anna Salome - Roberto Traven's first female black belt, promoted on September 9, 2017

Many of Traven’s black belts are instructors at Team Octopus locations or affiliated academies across the U.S., especially in the Southeast.
