= Tra Telligman =

American mixed martial artist

- Born: February 7, 1965 (age 61); Fort Worth, Texas, United States
- Other names: Trauma
- Height: 6 ft 2 in (1.88 m)
- Weight: 233 lb (106 kg; 16.6 st)
- Division: Heavyweight
- Reach: 75 in (190 cm)
- Fighting out of: Dallas, Texas, United States
- Team: Lion's Den
- Years active: 1995–2005

Professional boxing record
- Total: 6
- Wins: 4
- By knockout: 3
- Losses: 2
- By knockout: 2

Mixed martial arts record
- Total: 13
- Wins: 7
- By knockout: 2
- By submission: 4
- By decision: 1
- Losses: 5
- By knockout: 4
- By decision: 1
- Draws: 1

Other information
- Mixed martial arts record from Sherdog

Tracy Telligman (most often billed as "Tra" Telligman /ˈtreɪ/; born February 7, 1965) is an American retired mixed martial artist and boxer who has fought in the UFC, PRIDE, and Pancrase. He is also known for fighting despite having only one pectoralis major muscle.

== Background ==
Telligman was born in Dallas, Texas. He was in a car accident when he was only one and a half years old, and as a result, he is missing his right pectoral and also his right lung, leaving a deep recess in his chest. The accident also crushed his ribs and he has lived with the deformity ever since. Telligman began training in Karate when he was 8 years old, continuing until he was 13 years old, and then began Boxing until he was 15. He then began training in Jujutsu and participated in a full-contact Karate contest when he was in high school. Telligman also trained in Taekwondo, Kung Fu, Judo, and Wrestling.

== Mixed martial arts career ==
=== Early career ===
Telligman began training with the famed Lion's Den gym after meeting Ken Shamrock and fellow-Texas native and karate practitioner, Guy Mezger. Telligman's first professional fight was in 1995, and he won his first three fights, all by strikes in the first round before being invited to compete in the UFC.

=== UFC ===
Telligman made his UFC debut at UFC 12 in the UFC 12 Heavyweight Tournament against future UFC Light Heavyweight Champion, Vitor Belfort. Telligman was handed his first professional loss only one minute into the fight and Belfort would go on to win the tournament.

Two fights later, he faced Keiichiro Yamamiya in Pancrase and the fight ended in a draw. Telligman then returned to the UFC at UFC Japan against Brad Kohler and won via armbar submission in the first round. Two fights later, he returned again at UFC 20 to face Pedro Rizzo and was knocked out from punches 4:30 into the fight.

=== PRIDE ===
A year later, Telligman made his PRIDE debut at Pride 9 against Carlos Barreto and lost via unanimous decision.

In his next bout for the promotion, Telligman faced legendary Ukrainian kickboxer, Igor Vovchanchyn at Pride 13, and took the fight on two-weeks notice after teammate, Ken Shamrock, who was originally supposed to fight Vovchanchyn, hurt his neck in training. Despite being a heavy underdog, Telligman won via unanimous decision, as his boxing technique and footwork made the fight difficult for Vovchanchyn. This win was one of the biggest upsets in the sport's history at the time and after the win, Telligman became the #10 ranked Heavyweight in the world.

=== Return to the UFC ===
Two years later, Telligman made his return to the UFC in a rematch with Pedro Rizzo at UFC 43 and lost again via TKO due to a doctor stoppage 4:24 into the second round. Telligman then faced former UFC Heavyweight Champion Tim Sylvia and lost via head kick knockout at just under five minutes into the fight. Sylvia would go on to become UFC Heavyweight Champion a second time two fights after his win over Telligman.

Telligman became semi-retired from the sport after his loss to Sylvia, but has since retired from the sport altogether.

Tra was last seen coaching in the World Combat League.

== Personal life ==
Telligman is married.

== Championships and Accomplishments ==
=== Mixed martial arts ===
- Ultimate Fighting Championship
  - UFC Encyclopedia Awards
    - Fight of the Night (One time) vs. Pedro Rizzo
- Icon Sport
  - SuperBrawl 1 Heavyweight Tournament Winner

== Mixed martial arts record ==
Professional record breakdown
13 matches	7 wins	5 losses
By knockout	2	4
By submission	4	0
By decision	1	1
Draws	1	

Res.	Record	Opponent	Method	Event	Date	Round	Time	Location	Notes
Loss	7–5–1	Tim Sylvia	KO (head kick)	UFC 54	August 20, 2005	1	4:59	Las Vegas, Nevada, United States	
Loss	7–4–1	Pedro Rizzo	TKO (doctor stoppage)	UFC 43	June 6, 2003	2	4:24	Las Vegas, Nevada, United States	
Win	7–3–1	Igor Vovchanchyn	Decision (unanimous)	Pride 13 - Collision Course	March 25, 2001	3	5:00	Saitama, Japan	
Loss	6–3–1	Carlos Barreto	Decision (unanimous)	Pride 9	June 4, 2000	2	10:00	Nagoya, Japan	
Loss	6–2–1	Pedro Rizzo	KO (punches)	UFC 20	May 7, 1999	1	4:30	Birmingham, Alabama, United States	
Win	6–1–1	David Rivera	TKO (punches)	World Pancration Championships 2	January 16, 1998	1	N/A	Dallas, Texas, United States	
Win	5–1–1	Brad Kohler	Submission (armbar)	UFC Japan	December 21, 1997	1	10:05	Yokohama, Japan	
Draw	4–1–1	Keiichiro Yamamiya	Draw (majority)	Pancrase: Alive 9	October 29, 1997	2	3:00	Tokyo, Japan	
Win	4–1	Rick Mathis	Submission (heel hook)	World Pankration Championships 1	October 26, 1997	1	0:58	Texas, United States	
Loss	3–1	Vitor Belfort	TKO (cut)	UFC 12	February 7, 1997	1	1:17	Dothan, Alabama, United States	UFC 12 Heavyweight Tournament Semifinals.
Win	3–0	Walt Darby	Submission (punches)	SuperBrawl 1	June 28, 1996	1	2:09	Honolulu, Hawaii, United States	Won the SuperBrawl 1 Heavyweight Tournament.
Win	2–0	Brian Matapua	Submission (punches)	SuperBrawl 1	June 28, 1996	1	2:04	Honolulu, Hawaii, United States	SuperBrawl 1 Heavyweight Tournament Semifinals.
Win	1–0	Vladimir Hoodenkih	KO (punches)	Absolute Fighting Championship 1	September 25, 1995	1	1:40	Moscow, Russia	

== Professional boxing record ==
4 Wins (3 knockouts, 1 decision), 2 Defeats (2 by knockout), 0 Draws
Result	Opponent	Method	Round/Time	Date	Notes
Loss	(United States) Clifton Rubin	Knockout	1 (1:11)	2002-02-12	
Loss	(United States) Jonathan Williams	Knockout	1	2001-10-20	
Win	(United States) Jon Dixon	Decision	4	2001-09-22	
Win	(United States) Victor Bursey	Knockout	1 (2:01)	2001-08-18	
Win	(United States) Hector Ferreyro	Knockout	4 (0:10)	2001-07-12	
Win	(United States) Walter Wiggins	Knockout	1	2001-06-23	
