= Jerry Bohlander =

American mixed martial arts fighter

- Born: February 12, 1974 (age 52); Norfolk, Virginia, U.S.
- Height: 5 ft 11 in (1.80 m)
- Weight: 195 lb (88 kg; 13.9 st)
- Division: Light Heavyweight
- Style: Wrestling, Shootfighting
- Fighting out of: Dallas, Texas
- Team: Lion's Den

Mixed martial arts record
- Total: 15
- Wins: 11
- By submission: 10
- By decision: 1
- Losses: 4
- By knockout: 3
- By decision: 1

Other information
- Mixed martial arts record from Sherdog

Jerry Bohlander (born February 12, 1974) is an American former mixed martial artist. He competed in the UFC and was a UFC champion, winning the first lightweight (under 200 lb) tournament at UFC 12. He was a member of the MMA team the Lion's Den alongside other fighters such as Ken Shamrock, Guy Mezger, and Frank Shamrock. According to MMA journalist and historian Dave Meltzer, Bohlander was "considered one of the best under 200 lb. fighters in the world" during his time with the UFC.

== Early life ==
Jerry Bohlander was first exposed to combat sports in the form of high school wrestling. He was teammates with UFC fighter Pete Williams.

== Mixed martial arts career ==
Jerry Bohlander began his MMA career on November 9, 1995, at United Full Contact Federation 2, where he defeated Phil Benedict by armbar.

With his victory at UFCF 2, Bohlander received an invitation to the open-weight UFC 8 tournament. However, he still had to fight against his teammate Pete Williams at the Lion's Den gym in order to see who would fight in the event. The match lasted twenty minutes before Bohlander submitted Williams to a heel hook.

At the event itself, Jerry won his quarter final fight against Scott Ferrozzo, who outweighed him by nearly 120 pounds. Jerry would then lose his semi-final bout to future K1 and Pride veteran Gary Goodridge via KO.

After losing his fight with Goodridge, Bohlander would go on a 5 fight win streak that would culminate in him winning the UFC 12 Lightweight tournament.

Following his victory at the UFC 12 Lightweight Tournament, Bohlander was knocked out by future UFC Middleweight Champion Murilo Bustamante

Bohlander would bounce back from this knockout loss in his fight against Kevin Jackson. Jackson (an olympic gold medalist at the 1992 Barcelona games) was 3–1 at the time with his one loss being to UFC Light Heavyweight Champion Frank Shamrock. Jackson and Bohlander fought for ten minutes ending with Bohlander securing the armbar victory. The bout won Wrestling Observer Newsletter's "Fight of the Year" category for 1998.

After his victory over Jackson, Bohlander was defeated by future UFC Light Heavyweight Champion, Tito Ortiz. Bohlander would go on to fight 3 more times in his career before retiring from the sport with a record of 11–4.

== Personal life ==
On December 15, 2005, Bohlander, who had worked for the Napa Valley Sheriff's department for around a year, shot and killed armed 39 year old Sam Rodriguez. The shooting was found justified.

On June 30, 2010, he was involved in the fatal shooting of 38-year-old Jose Luis Martinez Chavez, who was armed with a kitchen knife. At the time of the shooting, Bohlander was a Napa County Sheriff's Deputy working with The Napa County Special Investigations Bureau (NSIB). Jeremiah Bohlander had been with NSIB six months. Napa County District Attorney Gary Lieberstein said that the shooting of Jose L. Martinez Chavez was justified.

== Championships and Accomplishments ==
- Icon Sport
  - SuperBrawl 1 Light Heavyweight Tournament Winner
- Ultimate Fighting Championship
  - UFC 16 Middleweight Superfight Winner
  - UFC 12 Lightweight Tournament Winner
  - UFC 11 Tournament Semifinalist
  - UFC 8 Tournament Semifinalist
  - UFC Encyclopedia Awards
    - Fight of the Night (One time) vs. Gary Goodridge
    - Submission of the Night (Two times) vs. Scott Ferrozzo and Kevin Jackson
- Wrestling Observer Newsletter
  - Fight of the Year (1998) vs. Kevin Jackson on March 13

== Mixed martial arts record ==
Professional record breakdown
15 matches	11 wins	4 losses
By knockout	0	3
By submission	10	0
By decision	1	1

Res.	Record	Opponent	Method	Event	Date	Round	Time	Location	Notes
Win	11–4	Kenny Kingsford	Submission (armbar)	Gladiator Challenge 24	March 20, 2004	1	1:40	Hopland, California, United States	
Loss	10–4	Romie Aram	Decision (unanimous)	Gladiator Challenge 2	February 18, 2001	3	5:00	Colusa Rancheria, California, United States	
Win	10–3	Brian Foster	Submission (armbar)	KOTC 5 - Cage Wars	September 16, 2000	2	1:03	San Jacinto, California, United States	
Loss	9–3	Tito Ortiz	TKO (cut)	UFC 18	January 8, 1999	1	14:31	Kenner, Louisiana, United States	
Win	9–2	Kevin Jackson	Technical Submission (armbar)	UFC 16	March 12, 1998	1	10:23	Kenner, Louisiana, United States	Fight of the Year (1998).
Win	8–2	John Renken	Submission (armbar)	World Pankration Championships 2	January 16, 1998	1	N/A	Dallas, Texas, United States	
Loss	7–2	Murilo Bustamante	KO (upkick)	Pentagon Combat	September 27, 1997	1	5:38	Rio de Janeiro, Brazil	
Win	7–1	Nick Sanzo	Submission (crucifix choke)	UFC 12	February 7, 1997	1	0:39	Dothan, Alabama, United States	Won the UFC 12 Lightweight Tournament.
Win	6–1	Rainy Martinez	Submission (rear-naked choke)	UFC 12	February 7, 1997	1	1:18	Dothan, Alabama, United States	UFC 12 Lightweight Tournament Semifinals.
Win	5–1	Fabio Gurgel	Decision (unanimous)	UFC 11	September 20, 1996	1	15:00	Augusta, Georgia, United States	
Win	4–1	Chris Charmos	Submission (rear-naked choke)	Super Brawl 1	June 28, 1996	1	8:27	Honolulu, Hawaii, United States	Won Super Brawl 1 Light Heavyweight Tournament.
Win	3–1	Alan Schaible	Submission (rear-naked choke)	Super Brawl 1	June 28, 1996	1	2:10	Honolulu, Hawaii, United States	Super Brawl 1 Light Heavyweight Tournament Semifinals.
Loss	2–1	Gary Goodridge	KO (punches)	UFC 8	February 16, 1996	1	5:31	San Juan, Puerto Rico	UFC 8 Lightweight Tournament Semifinals.
Win	2–0	Scott Ferrozzo	Submission (guillotine choke)	UFC 8	February 16, 1996	1	9:03	San Juan, Puerto Rico	UFC 8 Lightweight Tournament Quarterfinals.
Win	1–0	Phil Benedict	Submission (armbar)	United Full Contact Federation 2	November 9, 1995	1	3:05	N/A	

None	UFC 12 Lightweight Tournament winner February 7, 1997	Succeeded by Guy Mezger
