= UFC 8 =

UFC mixed martial arts event in 1996

UFC 8: Shamrock vs. Leopoldo
- The poster for UFC 8: Shamrock vs. Leopoldo
- Promotion: Ultimate Fighting Championship
- Date: February 16, 1996
- Venue: Ruben Rodriguez Coliseum
- City: Bayamón, Puerto Rico
- Attendance: 13,000
- Buyrate: 300,000

Event chronology
Ultimate Ultimate 1995	UFC 8: Shamrock vs. Leopoldo	UFC 9: Motor City Madness

UFC 8: David vs. Goliath was a mixed martial arts pay-per-view event held by the Ultimate Fighting Championship on February 16, 1996, at Ruben Rodriguez Coliseum in Bayamón, Puerto Rico. It is the only UFC event held in Puerto Rico and was later released on home video.

== History ==
UFC 8 was the first UFC event located outside of the Continental United States. It featured an eight-man tournament, and a UFC Superfight Championship fight between reigning UFC champion Ken Shamrock and Kimo Leopoldo. The event also featured one alternate fight, which was not shown on the live pay-per-view broadcast. The tournament had no weight classes, or weight limits. A 10-minute time limit was imposed for all matches in the tournament except Superfight and final (15 minutes).

The event's matchups pitted larger fighters against smaller fighters, hence the term "David vs. Goliath". Local promoter for the historical first and only professional mixed martial arts event was Richy Miranda-Cortese, whose company Sports & Entertainment Ltd had to take local Government officials to Federal Court in order to avoid cancellation of the event by the Government. Among those government officials was Governor Pedro Rosselló and Sports and Recreation Director Erick Labrador. The presentation of the event developed into a new boxing commission rules and regulations and Imposition of a banning Law that was later overturned after Miranda-Cortese fought it in court.

The tournament championship fight featured Don Frye against Gary Goodridge, with Frye taking the victory when Goodridge tapped out.

Just days before the show, the Puerto Rican government made a ruling banning the event. Two days before the card, Cablevision became the first major carrier, of what over the next few years would become nearly every major cable system in North America, to ban the show, stating it never expected to air UFC or similar type of programming ever again. The event is also notable as being the first MMA event to draw criticism, including Michigan politician Calvin McCard’s on site protests at UFC 8. These protests would spark the nationwide movement against MMA in 1996, spearheaded by Arizona Senator John McCain, which would later temporarily push the sport in the United States underground in 1997.

== Results ==
Superfight Championship
Weight class				Method	Round	Time	Notes
N/A	Ken Shamrock (c)	def.	Kimo Leopoldo	Submission (kneebar)		4:24	(Note: Shamrock defended the UFC Superfight Championship.)
Finals
N/A	Don Frye	def.	Gary Goodridge	TKO (submission to punches)		2:14
Semifinals
N/A	Don Frye	def.	Sam Adkins	TKO (doctor stoppage)		0:48	(Note: Adkins replaced Paul Varelans, who was injured in his Quarterfinal bout.)
N/A	Gary Goodridge	def.	Jerry Bohlander	TKO (punches)		5:31
Quarterfinals
N/A	Don Frye	def.	Thomas Ramirez	KO (punch)		0:08
N/A	Paul Varelans	def.	Joe Moreira	Decision (unanimous)		10:00	(Note: Due to a broken foot sustained in this fight, Varelans was unable to continue in the tournament and was replaced by Sam Adkins.)
N/A	Jerry Bohlander	def.	Scott Ferrozzo	Submission (guillotine choke)		9:03
N/A	Gary Goodridge	def.	Paul Herrera	KO (elbows)		0:13
Alternate bouts
N/A	Sam Adkins	def.	Keith Mielke	TKO (submission to punches)		0:50

== UFC 8 bracket ==
Quarterfinals
(United States) Don Frye (Wrestling)	KO
(Puerto Rico) Thomas Ramirez (Baguazhang)	0:08
(United States) Paul Varelans (Wrestling)	DEC
(Brazil) Joe Moreira (Brazilian Jiu-Jitsu)	10:00
(United States) Jerry Bohlander (Shootfighting)	SUB
(United States) Scott Ferrozzo (Wrestling)	9:03
(Trinidad and Tobago) Gary Goodridge (Kuk Sool Won)	KO
(United States) Paul Herrera (Wrestling)	0:13

Semifinals
(United States) Don Frye	TKO
(United States) Sam Adkins *	0:48
(United States) Jerry Bohlander	5:31
(Trinidad and Tobago) Gary Goodridge	TKO

Finals
(United States) Don Frye	SUB
(Trinidad and Tobago) Gary Goodridge	2:14

- Due to injury sustained in this fight, Varelans was unable to continue in the tournament and was replaced by Sam Adkins.

== Encyclopedia awards ==
The following fighters were honored in the October 2011 book titled UFC Encyclopedia.

- Fight of the Night: Gary Goodridge vs. Jerry Bohlander
- Knockout of the Night: Gary Goodridge def. Paul Herrera
- Submission of the Night: Jerry Bohlander def. Scott Ferrozzo

== See also ==
- Ultimate Fighting Championship
- List of UFC champions
- List of UFC events
- 1996 in UFC
