= Don Frye =

American mixed martial artist (born 1965)

- Born: Donald Frye; November 23, 1965 (age 60); Sierra Vista, Arizona, U.S.
- Other names: The Predator
- Nationality: American
- Height: 6 ft 1 in (185 cm)
- Weight: 210 lb (95 kg; 15 st 0 lb)
- Division: Light Heavyweight; Heavyweight; Openweight
- Reach: 73 in (185 cm)
- Stance: Orthodox
- Fighting out of: Sierra Vista, Arizona, U.S.
- Team: Team Frye
- Trainer: Dan Severn; Curt Hennig
- Rank: 2nd Dan Black Belt in Judo
- Wrestling: NCAA Division I Wrestling
- Years active: 1989–1990 (Boxing); 1996–2011 (MMA); 2002 (kickboxing)

Professional boxing record
- Total: 8
- Wins: 2
- By knockout: 2
- Losses: 5
- By knockout: 4
- Draws: 1

Kickboxing record
- Total: 1
- Losses: 1
- By knockout: 1

Mixed martial arts record
- Total: 31
- Wins: 20
- By knockout: 8
- By submission: 10
- By decision: 1
- By disqualification: 1
- Losses: 9
- By knockout: 5
- By submission: 2
- By decision: 2
- Draws: 1
- No contests: 1

Other information
- University: Arizona State University; Oklahoma State University–Stillwater
- Children: 2
- Website: donfryeusa.com
- Boxing record from BoxRec
- Mixed martial arts record from Sherdog

YouTube information
- Channel: Don Frye
- Subscribers: 118 thousand
- Views: 49.6 million
- Last updated: November 18, 2026

Donald Frye (born November 23, 1965) is an American former mixed martial artist, professional wrestler, and actor. In MMA, he was one of the sport's earliest well-rounded fighters and won the UFC 8 and Ultimate Ultimate 1996 tournaments and finished as runner-up at UFC 10 in his first year of competition. He retired from MMA in 1997 to pursue a career in professional wrestling with New Japan Pro-Wrestling (NJPW) After spending four years as one of Japan's top gaijin wrestlers, he returned to MMA with the Pride Fighting Championships in September 2001, much more muscular and sporting an American patriot persona in response to the September 11 attacks. He fought bouts with Ken Shamrock and Yoshihiro Takayama during his two years in Pride. He departed the promotion to compete in K-1 and Hero's in 2004 but returned for the final Pride event in 2007. He was inducted into the UFC Hall of Fame in 2016.

== Early life ==
Frye was born of Irish and Scottish descent. As a child, Frye moved frequently due to his father's service in the Air Force. Frye has recounted being molested on three different occasions in his childhood, which he believes contributed to his lifelong anger problems and underage use of alcohol beginning in the fifth grade. He dabbled with multiple sports in his childhood including little league baseball, judo, and boxing, but initially disliked wrestling upon his first exposure. Frye describes fighting a sole amateur boxing match in the eighth grade, knocking his opponent down before getting his nose broken. He recounts that he quit the sport afterwards at his mother's insistence.

He began wrestling at Buena High School in Sierra Vista, Arizona, then in college for Arizona State University in 1984, where he was trained by fellow future Ultimate Fighting Championship competitor, assistant wrestling coach Dan Severn. Frye recounts his collegiate wrestling career being interrupted by a shoulder injury, sustained after Frye crashed an ATV while intoxicated. In 1987, after returning from a yearlong recuperation, he won the freestyle and Greco-Roman events during an Olympic qualifier, but lost at the 1988 Olympic national trials. A year later, he transferred to Oklahoma State University–Stillwater, where his teammates included future colleague Randy Couture.

After college, Frye trained in boxing for a year and a half and made his professional debut on August 28, 1989, in Phoenix, Arizona, scoring a first-round knockout over Luis Mora. After eight bouts over the next fourteen months he retired and became an emergency medical technician and a firefighter in Bisbee, Arizona. He boxed under the name J.R. Frye in several matches after being forced to change his name due to a contractual dispute. In his final boxing match, Frye lost via technical knockout to David Kilgour of Somis, California, at the Reseda Country Club in Reseda, Los Angeles on December 11, 1990, bringing his professional record to two wins, five losses and one draw. Frye also worked in a psychiatric ward but left that position after breaking a patient's arm while restraining him. During this time, he also took up judo and earned the rank of second dan black belt.

== Mixed martial arts career ==
=== Ultimate Fighting Championship (1996) ===
In 1995, Don Frye helped train Dan Severn for the Ultimate Ultimate 1995, accompanying Severn's entourage to Denver. He soon made the jump to the burgeoning sport of mixed martial arts himself and joined the Ultimate Fighting Championship the following year. Debuting at UFC 8 in Bayamón, Puerto Rico on February 16, 1996, Frye was among the eight competitors in the openweight tournament that night and was one of two fighters of the era skilled in both stand-up and ground fighting, the other being Marco Ruas. In the quarter-finals, he set the record (since broken by Duane Ludwig and Jorge Masvidal) for fastest knockout in UFC history when his punches knocked down 410-lb Thomas Ramirez in just eight seconds. After a quick technical knockout of Sam Adkins in the semis, taking him down and landing hammerfists to the face for the TKO, he met with Gary Goodridge in the final, and forced the Trinidadian to submit simply by gaining dominant position at the 2:14 mark, though not without landing multiple uppercuts standing and punches on the ground. This would be the first in a trilogy of fights between the pair. Due to the controversy surrounding MMA at the time, Frye was barred from both firefighting, his previous occupation in his hometown of Sierra Vista, Arizona, and from training in the Buena High School gym he had used since his ASU days following the event.

Frye returned at UFC 9 in Detroit, Michigan on May 19, 1996, for a match with fellow tournament winner Marco Ruas, but Ruas was injured and replaced by Brazilian jiu-jitsu stylist Amaury Bitetti. Frye stopped his opponent's takedowns and land punches, knees and elbows, and used a judo ude-garami on the jiu-jitsu champion, something that was unusual at the time. At the end, after an especially hard series of strikes to the spine and head of the Brazilian, the match was stopped and Frye was declared winner.

At UFC 10 in Birmingham, Alabama, on July 12, 1996, Frye returned to tournament format. He defeated Mark Hall by stoppage, slamming the Moo Yea Do specialist and working his side with body punches until the stoppage, and then defeated Brian Johnston, again leading the action to the mat and landing elbows to the head. However, at the finals of the event, Frye faced Mark Coleman, who was considered the "godfather" of the ground and pound strategy Frye often followed. Coleman, a more decorated wrestling champion than Frye himself, kept the top position through the match and landed multiple strikes to the face. Frye capitalized on a failed neck crank attempt to get standing and try to outmatch Coleman there, but he was taken down again, and a late takedown attempt of his own also failed, with Coleman reversing and threatening with an overhead throw before returning to his routine. At the end, after Coleman secured side mount and dropped punches and headbutts onto Frye's face, the referee stopped the action, handing Frye his first loss in seven fights.

Frye won at the U-Japan event in November 1996, taking a submission victory by forearm choke over Mark Hall in a rematch. Just one month later, Frye entered the UFC's Ultimate Ultimate 96 tournament, held to find the best of the best from past tournament winners and runners up. He firstly went for the second time against Gary Goodridge, who brawled on the clinch before taking Frye down and landing headbutts, but the result was the same, as Goodridge tapped out as soon as Frye got dominant position. Frye then faced Mark Hall for the third time in his career, but this fight was even shorter, with Frye getting a takedown and an Achilles lock for the give up in 20 seconds. In the finals, Frye faced striker Tank Abbott, who landed early shots, opening a cut on Frye's face and causing swelling. However, Abbott lost his balance and fell, allowing Frye to secure a rear naked choke, to take the title of Ultimate Ultimate 96 Champion, his second UFC Tournament Championship.

Hall would later claim that Don Frye and manager Robert DePersia convinced him to throw the two fighters' semi-final match. Hall says that since Tank Abbott had already advanced to the final after two relatively easy wins, Frye – who'd logged eleven minutes of cage time already that night – wanted to save his energy for the championship match. Because he'd already suffered two defeats to Frye earlier in his career (and therefore probably wasn't going to win anyway) and DePersia implied that saying no would have a disastrous impact on his future, Hall says he reluctantly agreed to go along with the plot. Referee John McCarthy later wrote in his autobiography Let's Get It On!:

Unfortunately, this night was the second time I felt I was refereeing a fixed bout. In the semifinals, Don Frye and Mark Hall met in a rematch of their UFC 10 bout. In their first encounter Frye had beaten the piss out of Hall, who'd refused to give up. Here, though, Frye ankle-locked Hall to advance to the finals without breaking a sweat. The fight struck me as odd. Frye, a bread-and-butter wrestler and swing-for-the-fences puncher, had never won a fight by leg lock, and Hall practically fell into the submission. I also knew both fighters were managed by the same guy.

Despite his success in MMA, Frye retired from the sport after winning the Ultimate Ultimate '96 tournament.

=== Pride Fighting Championships (2001–2003) ===
A successful celebrity in Japan due to his pro wrestling career, Don Frye made his comeback to mixed martial arts when he signed a multi-fight contract with the Pride Fighting Championships in 2001. Appearing in an MMA bout for the first time in five years at Pride 16 in Osaka, Japan on September 24, 2001, two weeks after the September 11 attacks, Frye entered the ring waving an American flag and wearing a T-shirt emblazoned with the words "terrorists suck". He was also noticeably more muscular and seemingly stronger than his UFC days, having gained 7 kilograms (15 lb) in weight since his last MMA outing. However, his fight with Gilbert Yvel that night was controversial and resulted in Frye winning by disqualification in the first round, as Yvel repeatedly gouged his eyes and was eventually disqualified for continuously holding the ropes to stop himself being taken down.

Three months later, at a joint New Year's Eve show Inoki Bom-Ba-Ye 2001: K-1 vs. Inoki, Frye defeated Cyril Abidi with relative ease, taking the French kickboxer to the mat and controlling him throughout round one before finishing him with a rear naked choke in two.

Frye returned to Pride in February 2002, facing long-time rival Ken Shamrock at Pride 19 in a fight he had been trying to trash-talk himself into ever since Shamrock had defeated Dan Severn at UFC 6. Frye got the edge on a series of clinch battles, while Shamrock dropped down for an ankle lock and transitioned into both a kneebar and a toehold, wrenching Frye's leg badly; however, despite the damage, Frye refused to tap out and managed to knock Shamrock down in a subsequent punching exchange. The bout moved to the mat, where Shamrock attempted another ankle lock, only for Frye to try to counter with one of his own and finally refusing to tap out until time ran out. After an exciting and hard fought battle, Frye pulled out a split decision victory in which many people including the commentators Bass Rutten and Stephen Quadros said Ken Shamrock won the fight. Even though Shamrock had injured Frye's ankles, later leading to Frye's dependency on painkillers for several years, the two hugged after the fight ended, putting an end to their rivalry. Many MMA fans agree that both fighters were never the same again, as both their careers began a steady downturn after the fight.

Four months after defeating Ken Shamrock, Frye returned to MMA to face Japanese professional wrestler Yoshihiro Takayama at Pride 21 on June 23, 2002. In a fight described as the single-greatest brawl in MMA history, Frye and Takayama clinched in a hockey fight pose, each holding the head and hitting, with Takayama finally going to the body after more than a full minute of unrelenting, undefended shots. This would happen three times in the fight, until the referee stopped the bout after Frye mounted Takayama, who was visibly much worse for the wear.

On August 28, 2002, he took on Jérôme Le Banner in a kickboxing match at the K-1/Pride co-promoted event Pride Shockwave, fighting in front of 91,107 people. Frye had mentioned in an interview prior to the fight that (besides knee strikes) he had never thrown a kick in his life and his disadvantage was obvious as he couldn't use his wrestling skills and was repeatedly thrown when he tried to tie up with Le Banner. After being given a standing eight count early on, he was forced into a corner and knocked unconscious with a right hook at the 1:30 mark of the first round.

Riding a new wave of popularity, Frye's next outing was a return to MMA at Pride 23 on November 24, 2002, to face Olympic gold medalist judoka Hidehiko Yoshida. Taking his first loss since fighting Mark Coleman in 1996, Frye was submitted by Yoshida via armbar in the first round. While Frye did not tap out, the referee stopped the bout in fear of serious injury.

Frye took seven months off following the losses to Le Banner and Yoshida, and next fought at Pride 26 on June 28, 2003, to try to avenge his loss to Mark Coleman. In a rather long battle, Frye lost a unanimous decision to Coleman after three rounds.

Another rematch was on tap for Pride Shockwave 2003 on New Year's Eve, 2003 when Frye faced Gary Goodridge for the third time. The fight lasted only 39 seconds; Goodridge scored a vicious high kick to the head, knocking Frye out completely.

=== K-1 and Hero's (2004–2006) ===
Don Frye departed Pride on the back of four consecutive losses and next appeared fighting under MMA rules in K-1. His first fight, with Yoshihiro Nakao at K-1 MMA ROMANEX on May 22, 2004, ended in a no contest when Frye could not continue due to a cut sustained from an accidental headbutt early in round one.

Don Frye and Yoshihiro Nakao rematched at K-1 Premium 2004 Dynamite on December 31, 2004, with Nakao coming out on top and winning a unanimous decision, resigning the American to his sixth unsuccessful fight.

After another brief retirement, he returned in K-1's Hero's branch in May 2006 to fight Akebono at Hero's 5. Akebono spent much of the fight clinching with the much smaller Frye and pushing him into the ropes, but Frye was able to knock the former sumo wrestler down and secure a guillotine choke submission in the second round.

Just ten days later, in his first appearance in the United States since 1996, Don Frye took on Ruben Villarreal in King of the Cage: Predator in Globe, Arizona. After three rounds of what many considered to be a lackluster fight, the bout was ruled a draw.

In his sophomore Hero's fight, he defeated Yoshihisa Yamamoto at Hero's 6 on August 5, 2006, using the rear naked choke towards the end of the first round. In his last appearance in the promotion, Frye faced Kim Min-Soo at Hero's 7 on October 9, 2006, and knocked him out with a right hook in the second round.

=== Later career and sporadic comebacks (2007–present) ===
Don Frye made his Pride return after an almost four-year hiatus, taking on James Thompson at the last promotion's last ever event, Pride 34 on April 8, 2007. After an aggressive start, Thompson landed two soccer kicks that dazed Frye. Thompson landed several more blows on a defenseless Frye before the referee called the fight at 6:25 in the first round.

That year, he also assembled and coached the Arizona-based Tucson Scorpions in the International Fight League, but on November 9, 2007, announced on TAGG radio that he and the IFL had parted ways. They were one of four new teams established at the beginning of the 2007 season. He also wrote a humorous weekly column called "Dear Don: Advice from The Predator" in which he gives fans advice on love, life, friendship, and more.

Following a forty-seven second knockout of Bryan Pardoe at NLF: Heavy Hands in Dallas, Texas, in January 2008, Don Frye announced on February 8, 2008, on TAGG Radio that he would be fighting Oleg Taktarov on the debut card for YAMMA Pit Fighting on April 11 in the Trump Taj Mahal in Atlantic City, New Jersey. The fight was to be the first fight in YAMMA's Masters Division, a division for fighters over the age of 39. However, he had to withdraw due to an injury and was replaced by UFC 1 entree Patrick Smith.

Following his tenure with the IFL and a one-off fight with Texas-based promotion NoLimit Fighting, Don Frye competed in his inaugural fight with the DEEP organization, fighting Japanese fan favorite Ikuhisa Minowa. Minowa won via kneebar at the 3:56 mark of round one, dropping Frye's record in Japan to 8-6. From there, he signed with Shark Fights stateside the following year. His submitted Ritch Moss at Shark Fights 4 in May 2009 but suffered a quick TKO loss at the hands of Dave Herman at Shark Fights 6: Stars & Stripes four months later.

After a two-year absence and at forty-six years of age, Frye was scheduled to face Mike Gonzalez for the Gladiator Challenge Light Heavyweight title. However, Gonzalez was injured, so Frye instead faced Ruben Villareal in a rematch at Heavyweight. Frye lost via knock-out.

== Professional wrestling career ==
=== New Japan Pro-Wrestling (1997–2002, 2004) ===
Don Frye
Personal information
- Born: November 23, 1965 (age 60) Sierra Vista, Arizona, United States

Professional wrestling career
- Ring name(s): Don Frye; The Predator
- Billed height: 6 ft 1 in (1.85 m)
- Billed weight: 242 lb (110 kg)
- Billed from: Sierra Vista, Arizona
- Trained by: Curt Hennig; Brad Rheingans
- Debut: August 2, 1997
- Retired: November 13, 2021

After leaving the UFC, Frye went into professional wrestling and was trained by Brad Rheingans and Curt Hennig. He debuted for New Japan Pro-Wrestling (NJPW) in August 1997, defeating Kazuyuki Fujita in his first match. By 1998, Frye began to rise in the ranks as he quickly became one of the company's lead heels. On April 4, 1998, Frye won the Antonio Final Opponent tournament and earned the right to wrestle NJPW founder and wrestling legend Antonio Inoki in his retirement match, which took place later that night. Frye lost that fight. After a brief feud with Kensuke Sasaki at the end of that year, Frye joined Masahiro Chono's new stable, Team 2000, in early 1999. After joining, Frye would spend most of 1999 and early 2000 feuding with Scott Norton over the unofficial title of Gaijin Ace, took part in the G1 Tag League in 1999 with Chono, and make two challenges for the IWGP Heavyweight Championship but was unsuccessful in each attempt. He lost out to Keiji Mutoh in his first title shot in April 1999 and was defeated by Kensuke Sasaki in his second in February 2000.

After being in Team 2000 for two years, Frye left the group and joined Keiji Mutoh's new stable, BATT, where he made a third attempt at the IWGP title in July 2001 but came up short again, falling to Kazuyuki Fujita. In September 2001, Frye won the G1 World Climax tournament. After the tournament win, Frye left NJPW and returned to MMA. Stepping back into the pro wrestling arena, Frye would make a one-time appearance at NJPW's Fighting Spirit Memorial Day Tokyo Dome show on May 2, 2002, where he defeated Tadao Yasuda. From October to November 2004, Frye returned to NJPW for two appearances as a member of Masahiro Chono's Black New Japan stable, teaming with Chono in a tag match defeating Hiroyoshi Tenzan and Yuji Nagata and then teaming with Scott Norton and Manabu Nakanishi in a winning effort against Shinsuke Nakamura, Yutaka Yoshie, and Blue Wolf.

=== Other promotions (2003–2021) ===
In a brief comeback to professional wrestling in 2003, he competed for Fighting World of Japan on two occasions. He also appeared for All Japan Pro Wrestling (AJPW) on October 26, 2003, at their 31st anniversary, challenging Toshiaki Kawada for the Triple Crown Heavyweight Championship in a losing effort.

On October 2, 2005, Frye took part in AJPW's Wrestle-1 Grand Prix where he lost to Jamal.

During his brief MMA hiatus, Frye made a one-off appearance as a pro wrestler in Inoki Genome Federation, losing to Josh Barnett via keylock submission on September 8, 2007. In October 2008, Frye wrestled at the Pro Wrestling Expo shows, teaming with Yoshihiro Takayama in a losing effort to Masahiro Chono and Scott Norton on the first day, then losing a six-man tag on the third day.

Frye returned to a professional wrestling ring on March 17, 2013, at an event held by AJPW in Tokyo. After teaming with Keiji Mutoh to defeat Masayuki Kono and Yoshihiro Takayama in a tag team match, Frye engaged in a post-match brawl with Takayama, playing off their Pride 21 bout from 2002.

== Acting ==
Don Frye began acting in movies with Godzilla: Final Wars (2004), playing the role of Captain Douglas Gordon. In an interview, Frye mentions that unlike his fights where he has complete control, acting in a Godzilla film he had no control but enjoyed the experience nonetheless. The director of the film, Ryuhei Kitamura, mentioned that he wrote the role with Frye in mind since he was a fan of Frye's matches. Kitamura found Frye's tough-guy/good-heart demeanor to be the perfect role for the character of Gordon. Curiously, for a prominent character in a Japanese-language film, all of his dialogue was spoken in English.

The year 2005 turned out to be a busy year for Frye as he made several appearances. In Just Another Romantic Wrestling Comedy, he played Rocco Piedra, the father of a wrestling family who dreams on marrying their child off to a famous wrestler. He also appeared in No Rules and starred in Nagurimono. In 2006, he made an appearance as an Aryan Brotherhood member in Miami Vice, lent his voice for The Ant Bully, and appeared in the Rob Schneider prison comedy Big Stan, along with fellow mixed martial artists Randy Couture and Bob Sapp in 2007.

He played FBI agent Clarence Hurt in Public Enemies, by director Michael Mann.

Since he competed in Pride FC, he has also appeared in several commercial ads in Japan. The latest one is a television ad for a yakisoba product named "UFO" produced by Nissin Foods (an executive officer was a fierce fan of Frye). His significant popularity in Japan in the 2000s might be attributed to his "good old tough fuddy-duddy" character reminiscent of sheriffs in some 1960s American movies.

Frye appeared in an episode of It's Always Sunny in Philadelphia entitled "The Gang Wrestles for the Troops", in which he played a professional wrestler that was getting pummeled by Roddy Piper's character, "Da' Maniac". He is credited on IMDb for the role as "Wrestling Opponent".

Frye also appeared in a new AT&T mini-movie advertisement for the Blackberry Bold 9700 entitled "Stay One Step Ahead" during the 2009 holiday season.

Frye provided the voice for the main villain Matt Ninesister in the third installment of the Stick 10: Even More Swag animated specials, The United League of Stereotypes. Frye also portrayed mayor and former wrestler Mike Haggar in the Final Fight fan film "The Broken Gear".

== Personal life ==
Frye is divorced and has two daughters.

In 2022, he began hosting the Dan and Don's Toxic Masculinity Podcast with his longtime friend Dan Severn. He also runs his own YouTube channel where he shares videos about his ranch.

== Championships and accomplishments ==
=== Mixed martial arts ===
- Martial Arts History Museum Hall of Fame
  - Class of 2023
- George Tragos/Lou Thesz Professional Wrestling Hall of Fame
  - George Tragos Award (2024)
- Ultimate Fighting Championship
  - UFC Hall of Fame (Pioneer Wing, Class of 2016)
  - UFC 8 Tournament Winner
  - UFC Ultimate Ultimate 1996 Tournament Winner
  - UFC 10 Tournament Runner-Up
  - UFC Viewer's Choice Award
  - UFC Encyclopedia Awards
    - Fight of the Night (Three times) vs. Amaury Bitetti, Mark Coleman and Tank Abbott
    - Submission of the Night (One time) vs. Mark Hall
  - One of only two fighters to win a UFC Tournament and Ultimate Ultimate Tournament (Dan Severn)
- Wrestling Observer Newsletter
  - Fight of the Year (2002) vs. Yoshihiro Takayama on June 23
- Bleacher Report
  - #4 Ranked MMA Fight of All Time vs. Yoshihiro Takayama at Pride 21
  - #72 Ranked MMA Fight of All Time vs. Mark Coleman at UFC 10
  - #75 Ranked MMA Fight of All Time vs. Ken Shamrock at Pride 19

=== Professional wrestling ===
- New Japan Pro-Wrestling
  - Antonio Inoki Final Opponent Tournament Winner (1998)
  - G-1 World League (2001)
  - Greatest Gaijin Grapple Section (2002)
- Pro Wrestling Illustrated
  - Ranked No. 175 of the top 500 singles wrestlers in the PWI 500 in 1999
  - Ranked No. 247 of the top 500 singles wrestlers in the "PWI Years" in 2003

== Professional boxing record ==
8 fights	2 wins	5 losses
By knockout	2	4
By decision	0	1
Draws	1	

No.	Result	Record	Opponent	Type	Round, time	Date	Location	Notes
8	Loss	2–5–1	(United States) David Kilgour	TKO	4 (4), 1:36	Dec 11, 1990	(United States) Reseda Country Club, Reseda, California, U.S.	
7	Loss	2–4–1	(United States) Leon Carter	KO	2	Oct 1, 1990	Tijuana, Mexico	
6	Draw	2–3–1	(United States) Fred Heath	PTS	4	Jul 31, 1990	(United States) Reseda Country Club, Reseda, California, U.S.	
5	Loss	2–3	(United States) David Dixon	KO	1	May 21, 1990	(United States) Great Western Forum, Inglewood, California, U.S.	
4	Loss	2–2	(United States) Fred Heath	SD	4	Mar 27, 1990	(United States) Reseda Country Club, Reseda, California, U.S.	
3	Loss	2–1	(United States) Rocky Pepeli	KO	2 (4)	Oct 24, 1989	(United States) Reseda Country Club, Reseda, California, U.S.	
2	Win	2–0	(United States) Troy Baudoin	KO	1 (4)	Sep 26, 1989	(United States) Reseda Country Club, Reseda, California, U.S.	
1	Win	1–0	(United States) Luis Mora	KO	1 (4)	Aug 28, 1989	(United States) Sun Devil House, Tempe, Arizona, U.S.	

== Kickboxing record ==
Kickboxing record
0 wins, 1 loss, 0 draws
Date	Result	Opponent	Event	Location	Method	Round	Time	Record
2002-08-28	Loss	(France) Jérôme Le Banner	Pride Shockwave	Tokyo, Japan	KO (right hook)	1	1:30	0–1
Legend: Win Loss Draw/No contest Notes

== Mixed martial arts record ==
Professional record breakdown
31 matches	20 wins	9 losses
By knockout	8	5
By submission	10	2
By decision	1	2
By disqualification	1	0
Draws	1	
No contests	1	

Res.	Record	Opponent	Method	Event	Date	Round	Time	Location	Notes
Loss	20–9–1 (1)	Ruben Villareal	KO (punch)	Gladiator Challenge: Mega Stars	December 11, 2011	1	2:29	Lincoln, California, United States	
Loss	20–8–1 (1)	Dave Herman	TKO (punches)	Shark Fights 6: Stars & Stripes	September 12, 2009	1	1:00	Amarillo, Texas, United States	
Win	20–7–1 (1)	Ritch Moss	Submission (rear–naked choke)	Shark Fights 4: Richards vs Schoonover	May 2, 2009	1	2:48	Lubbock, Texas, United States	
Loss	19–7–1 (1)	Ikuhisa Minowa	Submission (kneebar)	Deep: Gladiator	August 16, 2008	1	3:56	Okayama, Japan	
Win	19–6–1 (1)	Bryan Pardoe	KO (punches)	NLF: Heavy Hands	January 26, 2008	1	0:47	Dallas, Texas, United States	
Loss	18–6–1 (1)	James Thompson	TKO (punches)	Pride 34	April 8, 2007	1	6:23	Saitama, Japan	
Win	18–5–1 (1)	Kim Min-Soo	KO (punch)	Hero's 7	October 9, 2006	2	2:47	Yokohama, Japan	
Win	17–5–1 (1)	Yoshihisa Yamamoto	Submission (rear–naked choke)	Hero's 6	August 5, 2006	1	4:52	Tokyo, Japan	
Draw	16–5–1 (1)	Ruben Villareal	Draw	KOTC: Predator	May 13, 2006	3	5:00	Globe, Arizona, United States	
Win	16–5 (1)	Akebono	Submission (guillotine choke)	Hero's 5	May 3, 2006	2	3:50	Tokyo, Japan	
Loss	15–5 (1)	Yoshihiro Nakao	Decision (unanimous)	K-1 Premium 2004 Dynamite	December 31, 2004	3	5:00	Osaka, Japan	
NC	15–4 (1)	Yoshihiro Nakao	NC (cut caused by accidental headbutt)	K-1 MMA ROMANEX	May 22, 2004	1	1:19	Saitama, Japan	
Loss	15–4	Gary Goodridge	KO (head kick)	Pride Shockwave 2003	December 31, 2003	1	0:39	Saitama, Japan	
Loss	15–3	Mark Coleman	Decision (unanimous)	Pride 26	June 8, 2003	3	5:00	Yokohama, Japan	
Loss	15–2	Hidehiko Yoshida	Technical Submission (armbar)	Pride 23	November 24, 2002	1	5:32	Tokyo, Japan	
Win	15–1	Yoshihiro Takayama	TKO (punches)	Pride 21	June 23, 2002	1	6:10	Saitama, Japan	Fight of the Year (2002).
Win	14–1	Ken Shamrock	Decision (split)	Pride 19	February 24, 2002	3	5:00	Saitama, Japan	
Win	13–1	Cyril Abidi	Submission (rear–naked choke)	Inoki Bom-Ba-Ye 2001	December 31, 2001	2	0:33	Saitama, Japan	
Win	12–1	Gilbert Yvel	DQ (eye gouging)	Pride 16	September 24, 2001	1	7:27	Osaka, Japan	
Win	11–1	Eric Valdez	Submission (choke)	Unified Shoot Wrestling Federation 5	June 20, 1997	1	0:49	Amarillo, Texas, United States	
Win	10–1	Tank Abbott	Submission (rear–naked choke)	Ultimate Ultimate 96	December 7, 1996	1	1:22	Birmingham, Alabama, United States	Won the Ultimate Ultimate 96 Tournament.
Win	9–1	Mark Hall	Submission (achilles lock)	Ultimate Ultimate 96	December 7, 1996	1	0:20	Birmingham, Alabama, United States	UFC Ultimate Ultimate 1996 Semi-Final.
Win	8–1	Gary Goodridge	Submission (fatigue)	Ultimate Ultimate 96	December 7, 1996	1	11:19	Birmingham, Alabama, United States	UFC Ultimate Ultimate 1996 Quarter-Final.
Win	7–1	Mark Hall	Submission (forearm choke)	U-Japan	November 17, 1996	1	5:29	Japan	
Loss	6–1	Mark Coleman	TKO (punches)	UFC 10	July 12, 1996	1	11:34	Birmingham, Alabama, United States	UFC 10 Tournament Final.
Win	6–0	Brian Johnston	TKO (submission to elbow)	UFC 10	July 12, 1996	1	4:37	Birmingham, Alabama, United States	UFC 10 Tournament Semi-Final.
Win	5–0	Mark Hall	TKO (punches)	UFC 10	July 12, 1996	1	10:21	Birmingham, Alabama, United States	UFC 10 Tournament Quarter-Final.
Win	4–0	Amaury Bitetti	TKO (punches)	UFC 9	May 17, 1996	1	9:22	Detroit, Michigan, United States	
Win	3–0	Gary Goodridge	Submission (position)	UFC 8	February 16, 1996	1	2:14	Bayamón, Puerto Rico	Won the UFC 8 Tournament.
Win	2–0	Sam Adkins	TKO (doctor stoppage)	UFC 8	February 16, 1996	1	0:48	Bayamón, Puerto Rico	UFC 8 Tournament Semi-Final.
Win	1–0	Thomas Ramirez	KO (punch)	UFC 8	February 16, 1996	1	0:08	Bayamón, Puerto Rico	UFC 8 Tournament Quarter-Final.

== Filmography ==
Film
Year	Title	Role	Notes
2004	Godzilla: Final Wars	Captain Douglas Gordon	
2005	No Rules	1978 Fighter	
2005	Nagurimono: Love & Kill	Unknown	
2006	Miami Vice	Long-Haired Aryan Brother	
2006	The Ant Bully	Soldier Ant	Voice
2006	Honor	Shay	
2006	Just Another Romantic Wrestling Comedy	Rocco Piedra	
2007	Big Stan	Nation Member	
2009	Public Enemies	FBI Agent Clarence Hurt	
2010	13	Handler #1	
2012	Badass Brock	Brock Bannon	
2013	Within	Grizzled Man	Short
2014	Noah	Warrior	
2014	Stick 10: The United League of Stereotypes	Matt Ninesister	Voice
2019	Animal Among Us	Burl Wolf	

Television
Year	Title	Role	Notes
2009	It's Always Sunny in Philadelphia	Wrestling Opponent	Episode: "The Gang Wrestles for the Troops"

== Footnotes ==
1. 'Injuries KO OU Wrestler', The Sunday Oklahoman, Mac Bentley, 23 October 1988
2. 'Three Cowboys Win Titles At St. Louis Mat Tourney', The Sunday Oklahoman, 20 November 1988
3. 'Fighter doesn't understand the furor', The Providence Journal-Bulletin, Mike Szostak, 12 June 1996
