= Fábio Gurgel =

Brazilian jiu-jitsu practitioner from Brazil (born 1970)

Fabio Gurgel
- Born: January 18, 1970 (age 56)
- Other names: The General
- Height: 6 ft 1 in (1.85 m)
- Weight: 205 lb (93 kg; 14.6 st)
- Style: Brazilian Jiu-Jitsu
- Team: Alliance Jiu Jitsu
- Teacher: Romero "Jacare" Cavalcanti
- Rank: 7th degree BJJ red and black coral belt under Romero Cavalcanti
- Years active: 1991–1997 (MMA)

Mixed martial arts record
- Total: 5
- Wins: 3
- By knockout: 3
- Losses: 2
- By decision: 2

Other information
- Notable students: Demian Maia; Marcelo Garcia
- Website: www.fabiogurgel.com.br
- Mixed martial arts record from Sherdog

Fábio Duca Gurgel do Amaral (born 18 January 1970) is a Brazilian former mixed martial artist and 7th degree coral belt Brazilian jiu-jitsu practitioner and coach.

One of the best jiu-jitsu competitors of his generation, Gurgel is a 4-time World Jiu-Jitsu Champion (1996–2001), Brazilian National champion and European Open champion. Gurgel is the co-founder of the Alliance Jiu Jitsu team, president of the Professional League of Jiu-Jitsu, and is regarded as one of the top coaches in Brazilian jiu-jitsu.

== Biography ==
Fábio Duca Gurgel do Amaral was born on 18 January 1970 in Rio de Janeiro, Brazil. He started practicing Brazilian Jiu-Jitsu (BJJ) at the age of 13, receiving his black belt at the age of 19 from Romero "Jacaré" Cavalcanti. Along with Cavalcanti he co-founded Alliance Jiu Jitsu Team. Gurgel is the teacher of BJJ and ADCC World Champion Marcelo Garcia. He is also President of the Professional League of Jiu-Jitsu.

== Brazilian Jiu Jitsu ==
Awards and achievements:

- 1986 – Awarded purple belt
- 1988 – Awarded brown belt
- 1989 – Awarded black belt
- 1993 – Founded Alliance
- 1994 – Brazilian National Champion
- 1995 – Brazilian National Champion, Pan-Am Champion
- 1996 – Brazilian National Champion, World Champion
- 1997 – World Champion
- 1999 – Brazilian National Champion
- 2000 – World Champion
- 2001 – World Champion
- 2007 – European Champion
- 2008 – Awarded 5th Degree black belt by CBJJ, Pan-Am Champion
- 2009 – European Champion
- 2010 – European Champion
- 2013 – Awarded 6th Degree black belt
- 2020 – Awarded 7th Degree red and black belt

== Instructor Lineage ==
Mitsuyo "Count Koma" Maeda → Carlos Gracie, Sr. → Helio Gracie → Rolls Gracie → Romero "Jacare" Cavalcanti → Fabio Gurgel

== Books ==
- Brazilian Jiu-Jitsu Advanced Techniques (2007)
- Brazilian Jiu-Jitsu Basic Techniques (2007)

== Mixed martial arts record ==
Professional record breakdown
5 matches	3 wins	2 losses
By knockout	3	0
By submission	0	0
By decision	0	2

Res.	Record	Opponent	Method	Event	Date	Round	Time	Location	Notes
Loss	3–2	Mark Kerr	Decision (unanimous)	World Vale Tudo Championship 3	January 19, 1997	1	30:00	Brazil	
Win	3–1	Michael Pacholik	TKO (submission to punches)	World Vale Tudo Championship 3	January 19, 1997	1	4:50	Brazil	
Win	2–1	Patrick Smith	TKO (retirement)	World Vale Tudo Championship 3	January 19, 1997	1	0:50	Brazil	
Loss	1–1	Jerry Bohlander	Decision (unanimous)	UFC 11	September 20, 1996	1	15:00	Augusta, Georgia	
Win	1–0	Denilson Maia	TKO (submission to punches)	Desafio: Jiu-Jitsu vs. Luta Livre	September 26, 1991	1	9:55	Rio de Janeiro, Brazil	

== See also ==
- List of Brazilian Jiu-Jitsu practitioners
