= Mark Coleman =

American wrestler and mixed martial artist (born 1964)

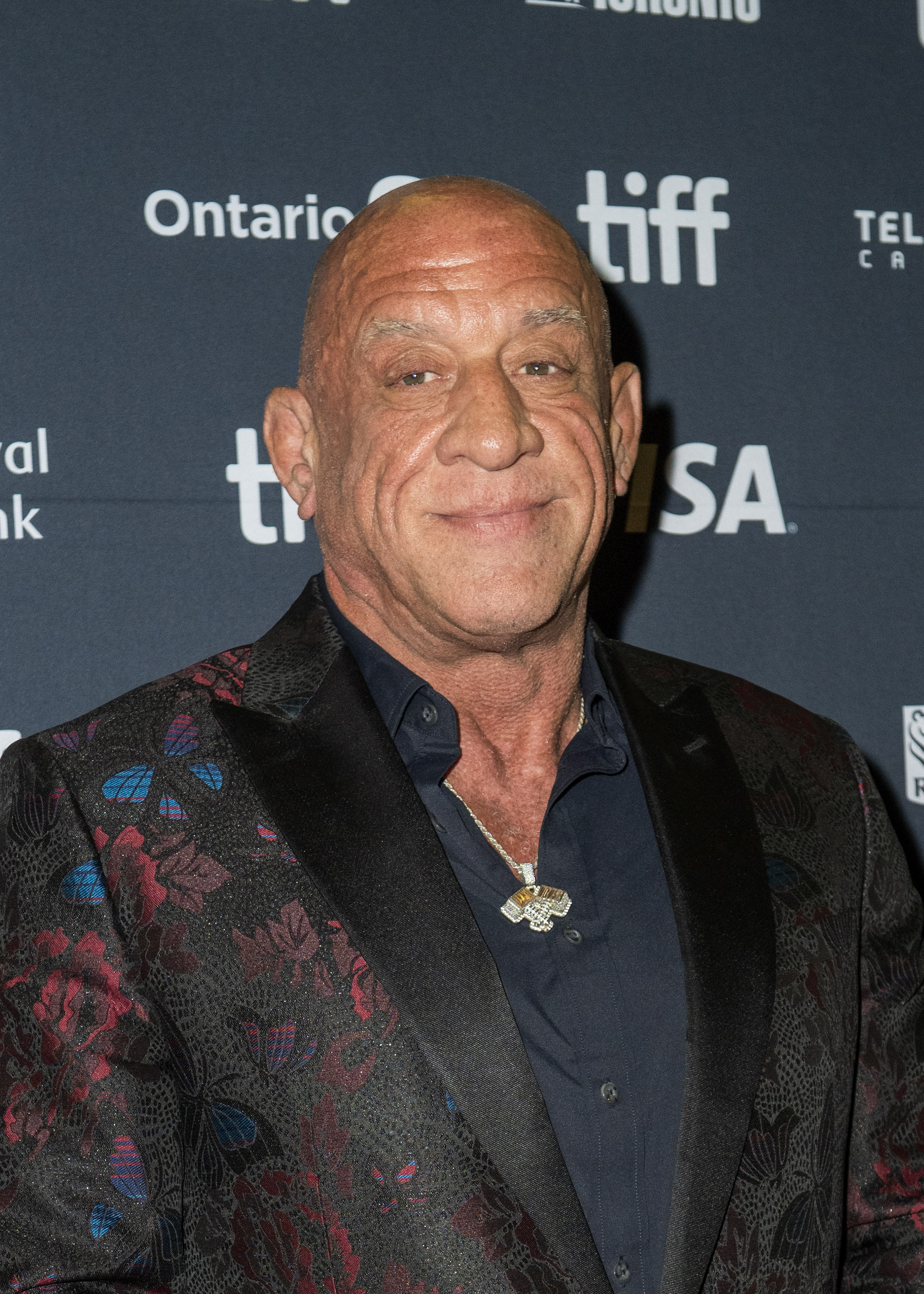
- Coleman in 2025
- Born: December 20, 1964 (age 61); Fremont, Ohio, U.S.
- Other names: The Hammer
- Height: 6 ft 1 in (185 cm)
- Weight: 205 lb (93 kg; 14 st 9 lb)
- Division: Light heavyweight (2009–2010); Heavyweight (1996–2006)
- Reach: 75 in (191 cm)
- Style: Freestyle wrestling
- Fighting out of: Columbus, Ohio, U.S.
- Team: Team Hammer House
- Rank: NCAA Division I Wrestling; Olympic Freestyle Wrestling
- Years active: 1996–2010 (MMA); 2000–2002, 2004–2010 (professional wrestling)

Mixed martial arts record
- Total: 26
- Wins: 16
- By knockout: 7
- By submission: 5
- By decision: 4
- Losses: 10
- By knockout: 3
- By submission: 5
- By decision: 2

Other information
- University: Ohio State University; Miami University
- Mixed martial arts record from Sherdog
Medal record
Men's freestyle wrestling
Representing the United States
World Championships
Silver medal – second place	1991 Varna	100 kg
Pan American Championships
Gold medal – first place	1990 Colorado Springs	90 kg
Gold medal – first place	1991 Havana	100 kg
Gold medal – first place	1992 Albany	100 kg
Pan American Games
Gold medal – first place	1991 Havana	100 kg
Collegiate Wrestling
Representing the Ohio State Buckeyes
NCAA Division I Championships
Gold medal – first place	1988 Ames	189 lb

Mark Coleman (born December 20, 1964) is an American retired mixed martial artist, professional wrestler and amateur wrestler. Coleman was the UFC 10 and UFC 11 tournament champion, the first UFC Heavyweight Champion, and the Pride Fighting Championships 2000 Open Weight Grand Prix champion. At UFC 82 Coleman was inducted into the UFC Hall of Fame.

Coleman is credited with proving the ability of wrestlers to dominate in the developing sport of mixed martial arts, and with being one of the first in American MMA to use the strategy that he coined ground-and-pound successfully, earning him the moniker, "The Godfather of Ground & Pound". In the sport of wrestling, Coleman was a World Championship runner-up and Pan American Games Gold medalist in 1991, won three Pan American Championships, competed at the 1992 Summer Olympics and was an NCAA Division I National Champion for the Ohio State Buckeyes.

== Background ==
Coleman was born in Fremont, Ohio, in 1964. He has described himself as a shy youth. As a teenager he began freestyle wrestling, and played baseball and football. He has described his parents as "the best mom and dad you could ever imagine," and notes they were very supportive of his athletic pursuits. In 1981, he was the first state champion wrestler for Saint Joseph Central Catholic High School. He then finished second in his sophomore year before claiming his second state championship in 1983.

He continued to wrestle for Miami University, in Ohio, where he was a two-time Mid-American Conference wrestling champion and earned his first All-American honors in 1986. In his senior year, he transferred to Ohio State University and won an NCAA championship in 1988. Out of college, he started as an assistant coach at his alma mater. Additionally, he won a gold medal at the 1991 Pan American Games and was awarded a spot on the US Wrestling team, placing second (100 kg) at the 1991 FILA Wrestling World Championships in Varna, Bulgaria. He competed in the 1992 Summer Olympics in Barcelona, Spain, but finished in seventh overall place. Coleman attributes his lackluster performance to coming in underweight after bouts with illness. Following his disappointment at the Olympics, Coleman continued coaching at Ohio State, but began abusing alcohol and binge drinking to cope with depression. He describes himself in this tenure as a "productive drunk," and took a part-time job as a bouncer in order to get free drinks.

He participated 1996 Olympic Trials, but self-claimed lack of focus on wrestling hindered his performance, resulting in a loss in the semifinals.

Coleman's collegiate wrestling record totaled 101 wins and 12 losses. He had 50 wins and 2 losses in his final season, in which he won the NCAA D1 national title at 189 pounds.

== Mixed martial arts career ==
Facing the twilight of his amateur wrestling career, Coleman transitioned to the then-new sport of mixed martial arts. His first exposure to the sport came when he and his friends watched UFC 1 at a party, which reinvigorated Coleman's drive to compete after his disappointing Olympics performance.

=== Ultimate Fighting Championship ===
Coleman's tenure in the UFC began when he was offered a slot in UFC 10 on 35 day's notice. He jumped at the opportunity and began preparing for the event immediately, taking steroids and quitting drinking to get into peak condition. Coleman won his first two tournaments in dominating fashion, including a win over UFC 8 champion Don Frye at UFC 10 in 1996, and becoming the first UFC Heavyweight Champion after submitting UFC Superfight Champion Dan Severn via neck crank submission at UFC 12.

Coleman made his first UFC Heavyweight Championship title defense at UFC 14, facing kickboxer (and heavy underdog) Maurice Smith. In the pre-fight interview with Joe Rogan, Coleman stated "I'm going to ground him and pound the goddamn shit out of him" thus coining the name ground-and-pound. In what turned out to be a long battle, Coleman lost a decision after 21:00 (regulation plus two overtimes). This was considered to be one of the largest upsets in UFC history at that time, largely because of the way Coleman had dominated his opponents in his previous fights.

Coleman took nearly a year off after having to get ACL surgery and returned at UFC 17. Coleman was originally scheduled to face Randy Couture in a title match for the UFC Heavyweight Championship, but Couture was injured during training and was forced to pull out of the fight. Coleman instead faced a relatively unknown (at that time) last-minute replacement fighter, up and coming Lion's Den product Pete Williams. In what turned out to be another long and strenuous battle, Coleman appeared to be completely exhausted after 10 minutes; he was fatigued to the point of resting his hands on his knees during the fight. Williams took advantage of Coleman's fatigue and landed a heavy kick to the face, knocking 'The Hammer' out for the first time in his career.

After his loss to Pete Williams, Coleman went to train with former UFC champion Ken Shamrock and his Lion's Den training camp for his upcoming bout with feared Brazilian striker Pedro Rizzo at UFC 18. The fight with Rizzo was part of the "Road to the Heavyweight Title", which was a four-man tournament between Coleman, Rizzo, Bas Rutten and Tsuyoshi Kosaka that would crown the next UFC Heavyweight Champion. After 15:00 the fight went to the judges, and they awarded a split decision win to Rizzo. The decision was controversial, with many and Coleman himself believing he did enough to win. In a 2010 interview, Coleman said he still feels the effects of the controversial decision loss to Rizzo.

=== Pride Fighting Championships ===
From 1999 through 2006, The Hammer continued his career with Japanese promotion, Pride Fighting Championships while also making appearances with the professional wrestling promotion HUSTLE.

At Pride 5, Coleman fought Nobuhiko Takada, who would become HUSTLE's owner and booker. Though thought to be the much better fighter, Coleman was caught by a heel hook from Takada and submitted. The validity of this fight has been questioned, with many believing the fight was fixed. In response to questions about the fight's legitimacy, Coleman said, "It was what it was. I needed to support my family. They guaranteed me another fight after that and I needed that security. It was what it was. I'm going to leave it at that."

Coleman won the Pride 2000 Open Weight Grand Prix tournament defeating Masaaki Satake, Akira Shoji, Kazuyuki Fujita, and Igor Vovchanchyn. The final was scheduled to be fought with a 20-minute time limit but according to Coleman, the day before the fight the rules were changed to no time limit. The change forced him to modify his game plan to attempt a quick finish as he did not believe he could put Vovchanchyn away with his ground and pound in a long match. The Hammer's training and 2000 tournament victory are depicted in the documentary The Smashing Machine: The Life and Times of Extreme Fighter Mark Kerr and also in the 2025 feature film of the same name.

After a quick TKO victory over Allan Goes at Pride 13 - Collision Course, Coleman faced possibly his toughest challenge ever in Antônio Rodrigo Nogueira at Pride 16. "Minotauro" was able to catch the Hammer in a triangle/armbar at 6:10 of the first round, breaking Coleman's six-fight winning streak.

Coleman would take nearly two years off following the fight with Nogueira, spending time with his wife and children, and focusing on developing his martial arts training facility and stable of fighters at Team Hammer House. Training such notable fighters as Kevin Randleman, Wes Sims and Phil Baroni, Team Hammer House quickly gained a reputation of turning out world-class fighters.

Mark Coleman returned to MMA competition at Pride 26 to face Don Frye in a rematch of their meeting at UFC 10; this proved to be a much tougher battle. Coming back from a career-threatening neck injury, Coleman ultimately won a unanimous decision victory after 20 minutes. Following the fight, Coleman apologized to the fans for the lack of action during the fight, in which he had spent the majority of the time taking down and maintaining positional dominance of Frye with his superior wrestling ability.

Between training fighters and spending time with his family, the Hammer was now fighting roughly once a year. He returned to competition to take place in the Pride 2004 Heavyweight Grand Prix, as the returning Grand Prix champion in the Open Weight Division. His first-round match at Pride Total Elimination 2004 was against Pride heavyweight champion Fedor Emelianenko. In what turned out to be a short bout, Coleman was submitted by armbar at 2:11 of the first round, eliminating him from the tournament.

Coleman returned to the Pride ring in February 2005, this time facing Mirko Cro Cop at Pride 29: Fists of Fire. Suffering the second knockout of his career, the Hammer fell to strikes by Cro Cop in the first round. In November 2005, Mark Coleman appeared in Bushido Europe-Rotterdam Rumble, Europe's first Bushido event, and choked out Milco Voorn at 0:56 of the first round.

The Hammer returned to action at Pride 31 with a victory over Chute Boxe team member Maurício "Shogun" Rua after the fight was stopped when Shogun suffered a dislocated elbow during a Coleman takedown. With Team Hammer House member Phil Baroni in his corner, Coleman began the match by taking Shogun to the ground. At 0:49 of the first round, Rua got up and as he took the first step Coleman grabbed his feet. Rua fell and broke his arm. Coleman then started peppering Rua with strikes before the referee stopped the fight.

Backstage in his post-fight interview, Coleman stated that the whole melee happened in the heat of the moment and that he did not blame the Chute Boxe team for coming in and backing their fighter. He then added that similar to Chute Boxe, Hammer House is also like a family, and thanked Baroni for coming in and watching his back. An outraged Chute Boxe refused to accept Coleman's backstage apology. The Chute Boxe team was assigned a yellow card for instigating this infraction. Coleman's contract was fought out at this point, and he subsequently re-signed with the organization. While Coleman was interested in returning to the UFC, he was unsatisfied with the $10,000 three-fight deal that White offered, and opted to take Pride's $250,000 one-fight deal to rematch Emelianenko.

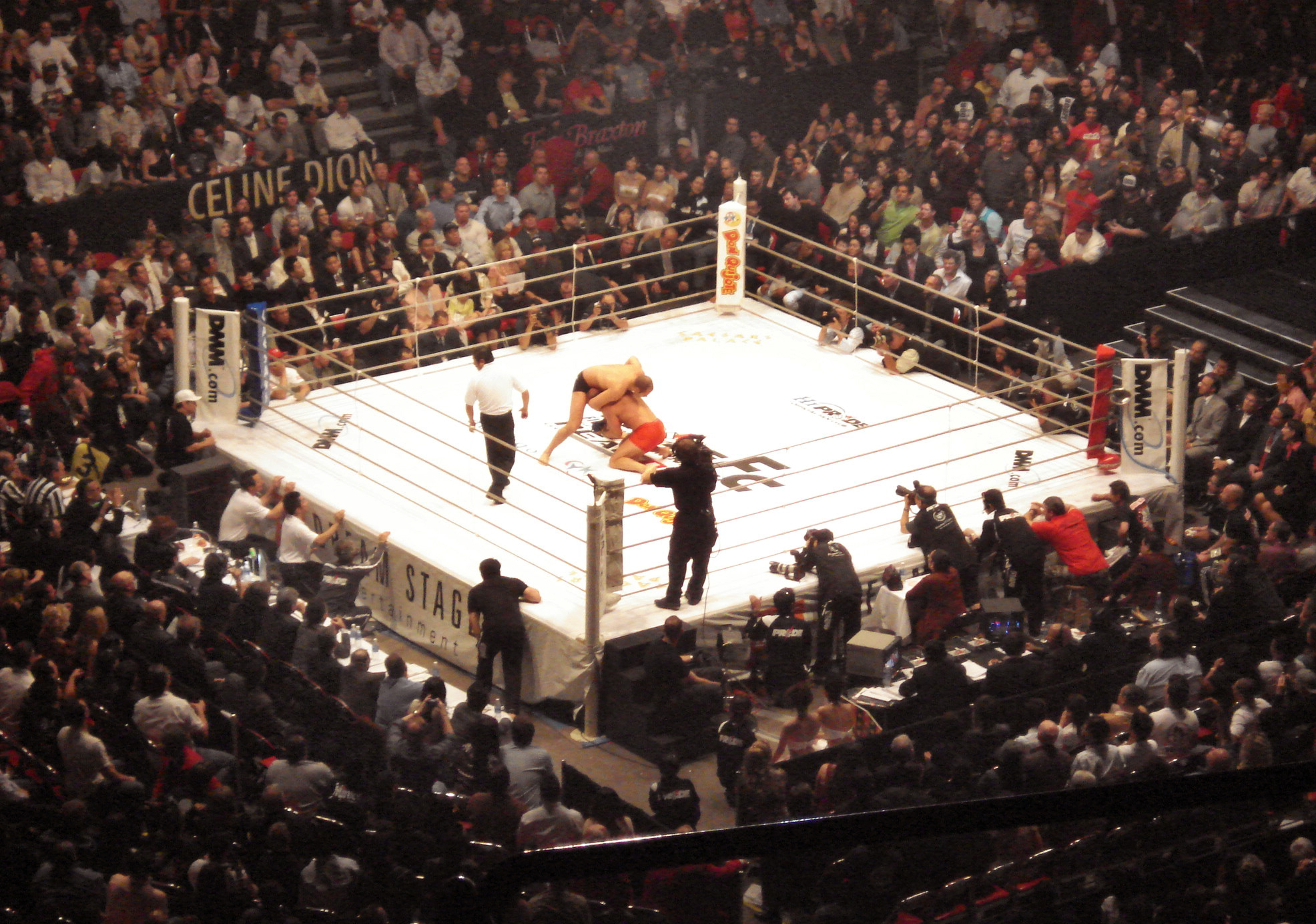
Coleman fighting Fedor Emelianenko at Pride 32

On October 21, 2006, Mark Coleman again faced Pride heavyweight champion Fedor Emelianenko at Pride's first American show, Pride 32: The Real Deal, and lost via submission (armbar) at 1:17 of round two. In the aftermath of the fight, a bloodied Coleman comforted his two frightened daughters after they had been rushed into the ring, repeating that "Daddy's okay." Photographer Sam Morris's photo of the event won first place at a Pictures of the Year International competition, and the moment has been described as iconic and heartwarming by those in the MMA community, including "Big" John McCarthy.

Mark Coleman appeared with teammate, Kevin Randleman, on the US pay-per-view broadcast of the final Pride event, Pride 34: Kamikaze, stating that he intended to keep fighting.

=== Return to UFC (2008–2010) ===
At UFC 82, Mark Coleman was inducted into the UFC Hall of Fame, making him the 5th inductee. Coleman announced that he was not retiring and would return to the octagon to fight Brock Lesnar on August 9 in Minneapolis at UFC 87. However, Coleman injured his knee while training, and was forced to pull out of the event. Heath Herring replaced Coleman for the fight.

Coleman faced Maurício Rua in a rematch in their first bout in the UFC at UFC 93 and lost by technical knockout as a result of punches late in the third round. This fight earned him a $40,000 Fight of the Night award.

At UFC 109, Coleman faced fellow UFC Hall of Famer Randy Couture, after originally being scheduled to meet at UFC 17 in 1998 twelve years prior, in which an injury forced Couture to drop out of the fight. Coleman went on record, multiple times during the build-up for the fight, in which he claimed this was his dream bout. After being outboxed on the feet, Coleman was taken down and defeated shortly after by (Rear Naked Choke) at 1:09 in round 2. The bout marked the first time two UFC Hall of Fame inductees had fought.

Following Coleman's loss to Couture in the main event of UFC 109, his sixth loss in his last 10 fights, he was released by the promotion.

=== Retirement from MMA ===
After going over three years without competing Coleman announced via Facebook that he has officially retired from MMA competition at 48 years of age.

=== UFC 300 ===
After Coleman saved his parents from a burning house in March 2024, fighter Max Holloway suggested that Coleman be the one to present the symbolic "BMF" ("baddest motherfucker") belt to the winner of the title fight at UFC 300 on April 13, 2024. This request was granted and Coleman ended up wrapping the belt around Holloway, who was victorious in his bout against Justin Gaethje.

=== Fight Circus ===
On January 12, 2025, Coleman returned to the ring and competed at Fight Circus 12 in Phuket, Thailand in a "wheelchair boxing match" against the CEO of the promotion Jon Nutt. Both fighters were strapped into a wheelchair and were pushed around the ring by their cornermen with Coleman's cornerman being former UFC fighter Matt Brown. At the end of the fight, both men stood up from their wheelchairs and Coleman knocked out Nutt at the last second.

== Professional wrestling career ==
=== New Japan Pro-Wrestling and All Japan Pro Wrestling (2000–2002) ===
In December 2000, Coleman had his first professional wrestling match when he was invited to the event Inoki Bom-Ba-Ye 2000, teaming up with Mark Kerr to defeat Takashi Iizuka and Yuji Nagata. He would also appear for New Japan Pro-Wrestling, defeating Nagata in a singles match. In 2002, Coleman would appear in All Japan Pro Wrestling's Wrestle-1 project, teaming up with Kevin Randleman to face Hiroshi Hase and Satoshi Kojima in a losing effort, and later Jan the Giant Convict and Singh the Giant Convict in a victory, with Coleman himself pinning Singh with a hurricanrana.

=== Hustle (2004–2007) ===
In 2004, Coleman started wrestling for Hustle and its partner promotion Pro Wrestling Zero-One. He debuted in the first as part of Generalissimo Takada's villainous faction Monster Army, going against babyface Toshiaki Kawada in a singles match which Mark lost by TKO. Coleman continued teaming up with other Monster Army wrestlers, including Dan Bobish, Commander An Jo and Giant Silva, but he was kicked out of the stable after failing to defeat top face Naoya Ogawa, thus becoming a babyface himself. Coleman then went free and ended up joining Wataru Sakata's team after losing a bout to him. Coleman and Sakata were successful as a tag team, but it was dissolved after Coleman left the promotion in 2005.

Two years later, Coleman returned to Hustle under the masked persona "Coleman", teaming up with the superhero-like team of Randleman, Kintaman and Kurodaman. Their biggest victory was when Coleman and Randleman faced the trio of Giant Vabo, Kohei Sato and Tajiri and won the match despite the numeric disadvantage. Mark's last match in Hustle was in July 2007, leaving the promotion again afterwards.

=== Inoki Genome Federation (2007-2010) ===
From 2007 to 2010, Coleman was a usual member of Inoki Genome Federation, wrestling names like Naoya Ogawa, Tadao Yasuda, Shinichi Suzukawa and Hideki Suzuki.

== Personal life ==
Coleman has two daughters, Mackenzie and Morgan, from his previous marriage. Coleman has a third daughter, Skylar, with a former partner, Tina.

Coleman has discussed recurring problems with alcoholism in his life, describing that his abuse of alcohol negatively impacted his fighting career. Coleman specifically cites that his drinking hindered his performance in the UFC following his win over Dan Severn, his tenure in Pride after winning the 2000 Grand Prix, and his second tenure in the UFC. He claims that raising Skylar after retirement kept his drinking in check during the day, but that he eventually left what he described as a "toxic" relationship. After leaving, Coleman's drinking problem became "way worse," and he spent several years living in a motel while struggling with severe alcoholism. The intervention of longtime friend and training partner Wes Sims persuaded him to participate in rehab. This was first revealed in a 2021 interview with Ariel Helwani, where Coleman stated that multiple personal life issues contributed to the situation and also that he's been sober since.

He appeared in the documentary The Smashing Machine: The Life and Times of Extreme Fighter Mark Kerr alongside fellow fighter and friend Mark Kerr.

In June 2006, it was announced that Coleman was one of the new coaches in the International Fight League. However his team, the Columbus Razorclaws, were unable to get off the ground, and he was replaced as a coach by Frank Shamrock the following month.

In 2018, Coleman revealed that he was one of the victims of Richard Strauss regarding the Ohio State University abuse scandal. He later stated that Strauss engaged in inappropriate contact with him on "many occasions." While Coleman describes that he and his peers spoke little of these incidents at the time, he attributes his lifelong struggles with anger issues to the abuse.

In late 2020, Coleman reported that he suffered a heart attack due to a complete artery blockage, and underwent a surgery to have a stent installed.

In March 2024, a house fire began at Coleman's parents' home in Toledo, Ohio. Coleman retrieved his parents, but his dog did not survive the fire. Coleman was hospitalized and put in critical condition due to smoke inhalation.

== Championships and accomplishments ==
=== Mixed martial arts ===
- Martial Arts History Museum Hall of Fame – Class of 2023
- Ultimate Fighting Championship
  - UFC Hall of Fame (Pioneer Wing, Class of 2008) and (Fight Wing, Class of 2016) vs. Pete Williams at UFC 17
  - UFC Heavyweight Championship (1 Time, first)
  - UFC 10 Tournament Champion
  - UFC 11 Tournament Champion
  - UFC Viewer's Choice Award
  - Fight of the Night (One time) vs. Maurício Rua
  - UFC Encyclopedia Awards
    - Fight of the Night (Three times) vs. Don Frye, Dan Severn and Maurice Smith
    - Knockout of the Night (One time) vs. Moti Horenstein
    - Submission of the Night (Two times) vs. Julian Sanchez and Dan Severn
  - UFC.com Awards
    - 2009: Ranked #8 Loss of the Year vs. Maurício Rua & Ranked #6 Upset of the Year vs. Stephan Bonnar
- PRIDE Fighting Championships
  - Pride 2000 Grand Prix Openweight Tournament Winner
  - Fastest win in PRIDE Fighting Championships History (0:02)
  - One of only two fighters to win Tournaments in both Pride FC and UFC
- Wrestling Observer Newsletter
  - Fight of the Year (1997) vs. Maurice Smith on July 27
- World MMA Awards
  - 2024 Lifetime Achievement Award
  - 2024 Fighting Spirit of the Year for bravery - fearlessly rescuing family and loved ones from a burning building

=== Amateur wrestling ===
- 1986 NCAA Division I Championships: (190 lbs 4th Place)
- 1988 NCAA Big Ten Championships: (190 lbs 1st Place)
- 1988 NCAA Division I Championships: (190 lbs 1st Place)
- 1990 Pan American Championships Freestyle Wrestling: (90 kg 1st Place)
- 1991 Pan American Championships Freestyle Wrestling: (100 kg 1st Place)
- 1991 Pan American Games Freestyle Wrestling: (100 kg 1st Place)
- 1991 U.S.A. National Freestyle Wrestling Championships: (100 kg 1st Place)
- 1991 FILA World Freestyle Wrestling Championships: (100 kg 2nd Place)
- 1992 Pan American Championships Freestyle Wrestling: (100 kg 1st place)
- 1992 Summer Olympics Freestyle Wrestling: (100 kg 7th Place)

== Mixed martial arts record ==
Professional record breakdown
26 matches	16 wins	10 losses
By knockout	7	3
By submission	5	5
By decision	4	2

Res.	Record	Opponent	Method	Event	Date	Round	Time	Location	Notes
Loss	16–10	Randy Couture	Submission (rear-naked choke)	UFC 109	February 6, 2010	2	1:09	Las Vegas, Nevada, United States	First UFC Hall of Famer vs. UFC Hall of Famer bout in UFC history.
Win	16–9	Stephan Bonnar	Decision (unanimous)	UFC 100	July 11, 2009	3	5:00	Las Vegas, Nevada, United States	
Loss	15–9	Maurício Rua	TKO (punches)	UFC 93	January 17, 2009	3	4:36	Dublin, Ireland	Light Heavyweight debut. Fight of the Night.
Loss	15–8	Fedor Emelianenko	Submission (armbar)	PRIDE 32: The Real Deal	October 21, 2006	2	1:15	Las Vegas, Nevada, United States	
Win	15–7	Maurício Rua	TKO (broken arm)	Pride 31 - Dreamers	February 26, 2006	1	0:49	Saitama, Saitama, Japan	
Win	14–7	Milco Voorn	Submission (arm-triangle choke)	Bushido Europe: Rotterdam Rumble	October 9, 2005	1	0:56	Rotterdam, South Holland, Netherlands	
Loss	13–7	Mirko Cro Cop	KO (punches and soccer kick)	PRIDE 29	February 20, 2005	1	3:40	Saitama, Saitama, Japan	
Loss	13–6	Fedor Emelianenko	Submission (armbar)	PRIDE Total Elimination 2004	April 25, 2004	1	2:11	Saitama, Saitama, Japan	Pride FC 2004 Heavyweight Grand Prix Opening Round.
Win	13–5	Don Frye	Decision (unanimous)	PRIDE 26	June 8, 2003	3	5:00	Yokohama, Kanagawa, Japan	
Loss	12–5	Antônio Rodrigo Nogueira	Submission (triangle armbar)	PRIDE 16	September 24, 2001	1	6:10	Osaka, Osaka, Japan	
Win	12–4	Allan Goes	KO (knees)	PRIDE 13: Collision Course	March 25, 2001	1	1:19	Saitama, Saitama, Japan	
Win	11–4	Igor Vovchanchyn	TKO (submission to knees)	PRIDE Grand Prix 2000 Finals	May 1, 2000	2	3:09	Tokyo, Japan	Won the Pride FC 2000 Openweight Grand Prix Tournament.
Win	10–4	Kazuyuki Fujita	TKO (corner stoppage)	PRIDE Grand Prix 2000 Finals	May 1, 2000	1	0:02	Tokyo, Japan	PRIDE FC 2000 Openweight Grand Prix Semifinal.
Win	9–4	Akira Shoji	Decision (unanimous)	PRIDE Grand Prix 2000 Finals	May 1, 2000	1	15:00	Tokyo, Japan	PRIDE FC 2000 Openweight Grand Prix Quarterfinal.
Win	8–4	Masaaki Satake	Submission (can opener)	PRIDE Grand Prix 2000 Opening Round	January 30, 2000	1	1:14	Tokyo, Japan	PRIDE FC 2000 Openweight Grand Prix Opening Round.
Win	7–4	Ricardo Morais	Decision (unanimous)	PRIDE 8	November 21, 1999	2	10:00	Tokyo, Japan	
Loss	6–4	Nobuhiko Takada	Submission (heel hook)	PRIDE 5	April 29, 1999	2	1:44	Nagoya, Aichi, Japan	
Loss	6–3	Pedro Rizzo	Decision (split)	UFC 18	January 8, 1999	1	15:00	New Orleans, Louisiana, United States	
Loss	6–2	Pete Williams	KO (head kick)	UFC 17	May 15, 1998	1	12:38	Mobile, Alabama, United States	
Loss	6–1	Maurice Smith	Decision (unanimous)	UFC 14	July 27, 1997	1	21:00	Birmingham, Alabama, United States	Lost the UFC Heavyweight Championship. Fight of the Year (1997).
Win	6–0	Dan Severn	Submission (scarf-hold)	UFC 12	February 7, 1997	1	2:57	Dothan, Alabama, United States	Won the inaugural UFC Heavyweight Championship and unified it with the UFC Superfight Championship.
Win	5–0	Brian Johnston	TKO (submission to punches)	UFC 11	September 20, 1996	1	2:20	Augusta, Georgia, United States	Won the UFC 11 Tournament.
Win	4–0	Julian Sanchez	Submission (scarf hold)	UFC 11	September 20, 1996	1	0:45	Augusta, Georgia, United States	UFC 11 Tournament Quarterfinals.
Win	3–0	Don Frye	TKO (headbutts)	UFC 10	July 12, 1996	1	11:34	Birmingham, Alabama, United States	Won the UFC 10 Tournament.
Win	2–0	Gary Goodridge	Submission (exhaustion)	UFC 10	July 12, 1996	1	7:00	Birmingham, Alabama, United States	UFC 10 Tournament Semifinals.
Win	1–0	Moti Horenstein	TKO (submission to punches)	UFC 10	July 12, 1996	1	2:43	Birmingham, Alabama, United States	UFC 10 Tournament Quarterfinals.

== Fight Circus record ==
1 win (1 TKO), 0 losses
Result	Record	Opponent	Method	Event	Date	Round	Time	Location	Notes
Win	1–0	Jon Nutt	Knockout	Fight Circus 12	January 12, 2025	2	0:59	Phuket, Thailand	Wheelchair boxing
Legend Win Loss Draw/No contest

Achievements
Preceded by Don Frye	UFC 10 Heavyweight Tournament winner July 12, 1996	Succeeded by Mark Coleman
Preceded by Mark Coleman	UFC 11 Heavyweight Tournament winner September 20, 1996	Succeeded by Vitor Belfort
New championship	1st UFC Heavyweight Champion; February 7, 1997 – July 27, 1997	Succeeded by Maurice Smith
New championship	Pride Grand Prix Tournament winner 2000	Succeeded by Wanderlei Silva
