= 1996 World Jiu-Jitsu Championship =

Brazilian Jiu-Jitsu competitions

- Venue: Tijuca Tênis Clube
- Location: Rio de Janeiro, Brazil
- Dates: 3-4 February 1996
- Website: IBJJF

The 1996 World Jiu-Jitsu Championship, also known as I BJJ Mundials, was an international jiu-jitsu event organised by the International Brazilian Jiu-Jitsu Federation (IBJFF) and held at the Tijuca Tênis Clube in Rio de Janeiro, Brazil on the 3 and 4 February 1996.

== History ==
The 1996 World Jiu-Jitsu Championship was the first international jiu-jitsu event organised by the International Brazilian Jiu-Jitsu Federation (IBJFF). Participants came from the US, Brazil, France, Japan, Holland, Switzerland, UAE, Italy and Cuba. The first ever world black belt match was between Helio "Soneca" Moreira and Octavio “Ratinho” Couto in the light featherweight weight class. While other organisations hold world championships, the IBJJF World Jiu-Jitsu Championship winners are the only ones referred to as Jiu Jitsu World Champions.

== Medallists ==
Adult male black belt results

Division	Gold	Silver	Bronze
Rooster (57.5 kg)	(Brazil) Marcos Barreto; Ac. Monir	(Brazil) Nikos Bahlzetis; Suiça	
Light-feather (64 kg)	(Brazil) Helio Moreira; Gracie Barra	(Brazil) Wellington Dias; Gracie Humaita	
Feather (70 kg)	(Brazil) Royler Gracie; Gracie Humaita	(Brazil) Paulo Brandao; Gracie Humaita	
Light (76 kg)	(Brazil) Paulo Barroso; Gracie Humaita	(Brazil) Renato Barreto; Gracie Humaita	
Middleweight (82.3 kg)	(Brazil) Roberto Correa; Gracie Barra	(Brazil) Eduardo Conceiçãoo; Carlson Gracie	
Medium-heavyweight (88.3 kg)	(Brazil) Roberto Magalhães; Gracie Barra	(Brazil) Luis Roberto Duarte; Carlson Gracie	
Heavyweight (94.3 kg)	(Brazil) Fabio Gurgel; Alliance	(Brazil) Murilo Bustamante; Carlson Gracie	
Super-heavyweight (100.5 kg)	(Brazil) Ricardo Liborio; Carlson Gracie	(Brazil) Leonardo Castello Branco; Alliance Jiu Jitsu	
Ultra-heavyweight (No Limit)	(Brazil) Mario Sperry; Carlson Gracie	(Brazil) Roberto Traven; Alliance Jiu Jitsu	
Absolute (Open Class)	(Brazil) Amauri Bitetti; Carlson Gracie	(Brazil) Ricardo Liborio; Carlson Gracie	
