= Marcos da Matta =

Brazilian jiu-jitsu practitioner and mixed martial arts coach (born 1973)

- Born: Marcos da Matta Meira; March 18, 1973 (age 53); Rio de Janeiro, Brazil
- Other names: Parrumpinha, Parrumpa
- Nationality: Brazilian
- Height: 5 ft 4 in (1.63 m)
- Weight: 145 lb (66 kg; 10 st 5 lb)
- Division: Featherweight
- Style: Brazilian jiu-jitsu
- Fighting out of: Boca Raton, Florida, United States
- Team: Carlson Gracie (1987–2000); Brazilian Top Team (2000–2002); American Top Team (2002–present)
- Trainer: Carlson Gracie
- Rank: Black belt in Brazilian jiu-jitsu under Carlson Gracie
- Years active: 2007–2018 (MMA)

Mixed martial arts record
- Total: 15
- Wins: 12
- By knockout: 2
- By submission: 8
- By decision: 2
- Losses: 3
- By knockout: 2
- By submission: 1

Other information
- Mixed martial arts record from Sherdog

Marcos da Matta Meira (born March 18, 1973), known as Parrumpinha or Parrumpa, is a Brazilian Brazilian jiu-jitsu black belt, retired mixed martial artist and mixed martial arts coach. A black belt under Carlson Gracie, he won the first IBJJF World Championship at purple belt in 1996 and the Brazilian national title at black belt in 2000. He moved to the United States in 2002 and is the head Brazilian jiu-jitsu coach of the American Top Team professional team in Coconut Creek, Florida.

He made his professional MMA debut at 34 and went 12–3 between 2007 and 2018, fighting for Strikeforce and Bellator. As a coach he has led Alexandre Pantoja since 2018, including Pantoja's run as UFC Flyweight Champion, and has worked with Petr Yan, Arman Tsarukyan, Renato Moicano, Amanda Nunes and Mayra Bueno Silva, among others.

== Early life ==
Da Matta grew up in Copacabana, where he spent his days playing beach soccer and footvolley. Carlson Gracie's academy was in the same neighborhood, on Rua Figueiredo Magalhães. By his account, Gracie met him on the beach when he was 11 or 12 and kept pushing him to train. He went "for a week or two to prove to him that I don't like it" and stayed. He began training regularly in 1987 and remained with Gracie until 2000.

His nickname reportedly comes from a well-known Copacabana local called "Parrumpa", whom he resembled, so friends called him "Parrumpinha" (little Parrumpa). Because of the number of Russian fighters he later began to coach, the Brazilian MMA community also took to calling him "Parrumpov".

== Brazilian jiu-jitsu career ==
=== Carlson Gracie academy ===
At Gracie's academy, one of his main influences was Amaury Bitetti, who got him to cross-train in judo and work on guard passing. He also practiced Álvaro Romano's Ginástica Natural, which he credits with helping him recover from injuries. He calls Ricardo Libório his mentor, and names Renato Tavares as his most frequent training partner.

He was promoted to purple belt on January 1, 1994, and his first match at the new rank was against Leonardo Vieira, who was still unbeaten at purple belt. The 20-minute match was part of a challenge between Carlson Gracie's academy and Romero "Jacaré" Cavalcanti's Academia Master, held at a nightclub in Leblon in February 1994. Da Matta says he won by a wide margin on points. He had been a little-known blue belt until then and calls it the fight that most shaped his life, since the jiu-jitsu community began to take him seriously afterward. The two met again later, and each won once.

In 1996 he won the first IBJJF World Championship at purple belt, featherweight, entered as "Marcos Da Mata", with Fredson Junior taking silver. Gracie promoted him to black belt in 1997. At black belt he took silver at the 1999 Pan American Championship in the 70 kg division, losing the final to Royler Gracie on advantage. During those years he also refereed as a center official for the Confederação Brasileira de Jiu-Jitsu.

=== Brazilian Top Team and the Robson Moura rivalry ===
When Carlson Gracie's leading black belts broke with him in 2000, da Matta left with Libório and Bitetti for the newly founded Brazilian Top Team. Under the BTT banner he won the 2000 Brazilian Nationals at black belt featherweight, ahead of Marcos Loureiro. The same year he reached the featherweight final of the World Championship at the Tijuca Tênis Clube and lost 2–0 to Robson Moura.

In 2010 da Matta said Moura had beaten him twice and that their rivalry "was good for stirring up the fans, but it never went beyond the dojo"; after both moved to the United States they trained together. They met a third time on October 18, 2014, in a 15-minute gi superfight at the World Jiu-Jitsu Expo in Long Beach, California, where Moura won by clock choke at around the four-minute mark.

=== In the United States ===
He competed at the 2005 ADCC World Championship in Long Beach and lost in the first round of the under-66 kg division to Urijah Faber. American Top Team lists him as a ten-time NAGA superfight champion.

Competing in the masters divisions at super-heavyweight, he won the 2014 Boca Raton Open and the 2015 Miami Open, took bronze at the 2017 World Master Championship and silver in 2020, when he lost the master 4 final to Roberto Godoi. His own academy lists him as a sixth-degree black belt; American Top Team's coaches page gives fifth degree.

== Mixed martial arts career ==
After moving to the United States, da Matta's job was to help Libório run jiu-jitsu at American Top Team; he gradually moved into MMA coaching and, past 30, into competing. He debuted on March 31, 2007, at 34, submitting Dan Funes in the first round at PFL: Genesis in Miami, and won his first seven fights on Florida regional cards.

Still unbeaten, he signed with Strikeforce; he said he had also talked to Dream and the WEC, but Strikeforce made the firm offer. At Strikeforce: Miami on January 30, 2010, at the BankAtlantic Center in Sunrise, he lost to Pablo Alfonso by armbar at 1:47 of the first round, for a disclosed purse of $2,500.

His Bellator debut came against Shah Bobonis at Bellator 50 on September 17, 2011, in Hollywood; he controlled the first two rounds with armbar and choke attempts before being knocked out by a right hand in the third. Three straight armbar wins followed in 2013 and 2014, before Solon Staley knocked him out at AFC 24 in January 2016.

After more than two years away, he took one more fight so as not to retire on a loss. On July 21, 2018, aged 45, he faced Jordan Mackin, 20 years his junior, at UCFC 1 in West Palm Beach, where he runs his academy, and finished him with a kata-gatame early in the second round, with student Pedro Munhoz in his corner. He said he had fainted during his weight cut and retired afterward, saying he could no longer balance fighting with travel, his athletes and his family.

== Coaching career ==
=== American Top Team ===
Da Matta moved to the United States in 2002 at the invitation of Ricardo Libório, one of American Top Team's founders, and in 2024 described himself as having been at ATT "since the beginning". He worked his first corner in 1998 and his first UFC corner in 2006. By 2009 the fighters he trained included Mike Brown, Thiago Alves, Marcus Aurélio, Gesias Cavalcante, Luigi Fioravanti, Steve Bruno and Cole Miller. He also owns ATT West Palm Beach.

He is the head jiu-jitsu instructor of ATT's professional team in Coconut Creek. According to da Matta, fighters at ATT pick their own coaches, and on busy weekends he has cornered five fighters across separate events. A positive COVID-19 test in June 2020 kept him out of the corners of Pantoja, Tsarukyan, Amanda Ribas and Luis Peña for a run of UFC events. At the time, Brazilian outlet Super Lutas described him as the man in charge of the jiu-jitsu of Amanda Nunes, Junior dos Santos and Edson Barboza.

=== Alexandre Pantoja ===
Pantoja approached da Matta in early 2018, after losing to Dustin Ortiz at UFC 220; both are from Rio, and Pantoja has said he wanted to be coached by a Carlson Gracie black belt. Pantoja won the UFC Flyweight Championship from Brandon Moreno at UFC 290 on July 8, 2023, and defended it four times before losing it at UFC 323 in December 2025, when he injured tendons and ligaments in his arm early in the fight with Joshua Van. He stayed with da Matta through his recovery.

Da Matta coached Pantoja to approach every title defense as a challenger. After three title fights in ten months, he insisted that Pantoja rest until the end of 2024 and told the UFC that, once rested, Pantoja would finish whoever they matched him with; Pantoja then submitted Kai Asakura at UFC 310. Pantoja compares the relationship to the film Whiplash: "I'm the drummer and 'Parrumpa' is the maestro." Da Matta calls himself Pantoja's "older brother".

=== Russian fighters and other athletes ===
From the late 2010s da Matta began coaching a large group of Russian and Caucasian fighters, starting with Omari Akhmedov and followed by Movsar Evloev, Petr Yan, Sergey Morozov, Zhalgas Zhumagulov, Damir Ismagulov, Muhammad Mokaev, Alexandr Shabliy, Movlid Khaybulaev, Magomed Magomedkerimov and Magomed Umalatov. He also cornered Kayla Harrison in the PFL. In 2023 Mokaev stopped training at ATT after Pantoja won the title; da Matta said he understood: "Pantoja is like a son to me, and it would be complicated for me to train two guys with the same goal."

He also coaches Tsarukyan, Moicano and Bia Mesquita, and was part of Tsarukyan's camp for his scheduled fight with Islam Makhachev at UFC 311. Mesquita, a jiu-jitsu world champion, moved to Florida in 2023 to make the switch to MMA under him. He cornered Mayra Bueno Silva for the women's bantamweight title at UFC 297 in January 2024, calling it a chance to bring Amanda Nunes's old belt back to ATT.

He was nominated for the Shawn Tompkins Coach of the Year award at the 2024 World MMA Awards.

== Controversies ==
=== 1998 World Championship ===
At the 1998 World Championship at the Tijuca Tênis Clube, da Matta refereed the purple belt open-weight final between Fernando Tererê and Rolls Gracie, son of the late Rolls Gracie. Tererê was down by an advantage when he locked in a triangle choke; to escape, Gracie lifted him and slammed him to the mat, an illegal move, and da Matta disqualified him. Gracie then attacked the referee. By da Matta's account, he was punched while bending down to tie his shoe and hit three more times on the ground, and was dazed for two hours afterward. He filed a police complaint at the 19th precinct in Tijuca, underwent a forensic examination and sued for physical and moral damages. Gracie was arrested at the scene, and Confederation president Carlos Gracie Jr. expelled him from the tournament and docked Gracie Barra twenty points in the team standings.

=== UFC 259 ===
Da Matta was in Petr Yan's corner at UFC 259 on March 6, 2021, when Yan lost the UFC Bantamweight Championship by disqualification for an illegal knee to a downed Aljamain Sterling. On the broadcast, Joe Rogan and Daniel Cormier suggested someone in the corner had told Yan to throw it. Da Matta denied it, saying he twice told Yan "just punch", that the referee had gone over that exact rule in the locker room, and that he could not follow what the other cornermen said in Russian. Of Sterling's decision not to continue, he said "only he truly knows" whether he could have gone on.

=== UFC 300 ===
After Tsarukyan beat Charles Oliveira at UFC 300 on April 13, 2024, da Matta went to the broadcast camera, mimed crying and shouted "respect me" in Portuguese. Brazilian fans accused him of disrespecting a national idol. He later said he and his wife had received abusive messages and threats in the preceding months, some aimed at his family, that the outburst was meant for those people rather than Oliveira or his coach Diego Lima, and apologized to those it had hurt.

=== Mayra Bueno Silva doping case ===
In 2023 Bueno Silva's win over Holly Holm was overturned to a no contest after she tested positive for ritalinic acid from an ADHD medication she had taken since childhood. Da Matta criticized the Nevada State Athletic Commission for punishing something USADA had cleared and publicly thanked UFC executive Hunter Campbell for keeping her ranked. In the same interview he said he gives private lessons to George Piro, a former FBI official and a director at the company taking over the UFC's anti-doping program, and dismissed jokes that ATT would benefit: in his view, ATT fighters would be tested even more.

=== Comments on other fighters ===
In October 2025 he criticized Jhonata Diniz for bringing businessman Luciano Hang into his corner at UFC Rio, where Diniz lost by TKO to Mário Pinto. "If you're a professional and you take your career seriously, you can't do something like that," he said, suggesting guests buy a front-row ticket instead. Earlier that year he questioned a training video Alex Pereira released before UFC 320, arguing that the partners shooting takedowns on him had no real wrestling pedigree: "Poatan is defending takedowns like nobody else, perfect, but who's attacking him?"

In April 2026 he said he would not coach Carlos Prates because of the fighter's lifestyle, as Prates often appears in videos drinking and smoking, adding that he liked watching Prates fight but did not consider him an example for young people. Online, some fans pointed to aggressive incidents involving Tsarukyan, one of da Matta's own fighters. That month, on the Mundo da Luta podcast, he called some MMA social media pages "gossip channels" that disrespect athletes without consequence, and suggested a trip to the police station for bullying would stop them. On Moicano's and Tsarukyan's own online provocations, he said: "Sometimes I don't agree with either one's attitude, but I'm not their father."

== Personal life ==
Da Matta says he has never drunk alcohol, smoked or used drugs. He is married and has two children. Calling himself "an extremely superstitious person", he avoids naming his fighters as favorites before a bout.

== Championships and accomplishments ==
=== Brazilian jiu-jitsu ===
- International Brazilian Jiu-Jitsu Federation
  - World Championship gold (1996, purple belt, featherweight)
  - World Championship silver (2000, black belt, featherweight)
  - Pan American Championship silver (1999, black belt, 70 kg)
  - World Master Championship bronze (2017, master 3, super-heavyweight)
  - World Master Championship silver (2020, master 4, super-heavyweight)
- Confederação Brasileira de Jiu-Jitsu
  - Brazilian National Championship gold (2000, black belt, featherweight)
- North American Grappling Association
  - Ten-time superfight champion, according to American Top Team

=== Coaching ===
- World MMA Awards
  - Shawn Tompkins Coach of the Year nominee (2024)

== Mixed martial arts record ==
Professional record breakdown
15 matches	12 wins	3 losses
By knockout	2	2
By submission	8	1
By decision	2	0

Res.	Record	Opponent	Method	Event	Date	Round	Time	Location	Notes
Win	12–3	Jordan Mackin	Submission (kata-gatame)	UCFC 1	July 21, 2018	2	1:33	West Palm Beach, Florida, United States	Final career bout.
Loss	11–3	Solon Staley	KO (punch)	AFC 24	January 29, 2016	1	1:18	Coconut Creek, Florida, United States	
Win	11–2	Jacob Clark	Submission (armbar)	AFC 22	September 19, 2014	3	2:11	Hollywood, Florida, United States	
Win	10–2	Roy Bradshaw	Submission (armbar)	MTC: In the Beginning	April 3, 2014	1	3:23	Fort Lauderdale, Florida, United States	
Win	9–2	Eric Kovarik	Submission (armbar)	Fight Time 13: MMA Kings	February 15, 2013	1	4:36	Fort Lauderdale, Florida, United States	
Loss	8–2	Shah Bobonis	KO (punch)	Bellator 50	September 17, 2011	3	2:04	Hollywood, Florida, United States	Catchweight (140 lb) bout. Bellator debut.
Win	8–1	James Wynn	Submission (rear-naked choke)	G-Force Fights: Bad Blood 4	November 18, 2010	1	1:28	Coral Gables, Florida, United States	
Loss	7–1	Pablo Alfonso	Submission (armbar)	Strikeforce: Miami	January 30, 2010	1	1:47	Sunrise, Florida, United States	Strikeforce debut.
Win	7–0	Steve Kinnison	KO (punch)	G-Force Fights: Bad Blood 2	September 26, 2009	1	1:25	Coral Gables, Florida, United States	
Win	6–0	Chris Thorne	Submission (rear-naked choke)	XFN: Da Matta vs. Thorne	May 14, 2009	1	2:24	Fort Lauderdale, Florida, United States	
Win	5–0	Ralph Acosta	Decision (split)	RW 3: Florida	April 24, 2009	3	5:00	Fort Lauderdale, Florida, United States	
Win	4–0	Nick Meginness	Decision (unanimous)	SRP: Square Ring Promotions	March 14, 2009	3	5:00	Fort Lauderdale, Florida, United States	
Win	3–0	Chino Duran	Submission (rear-naked choke)	RIC: Cage Fighting Championships	October 6, 2007	1	3:27	Fort Lauderdale, Florida, United States	
Win	2–0	Jason Bowman	TKO (punches)	HIP: Harmful Intent Promotions 1	July 14, 2007	1	2:27	Fort Myers, Florida, United States	
Win	1–0	Dan Funes	Submission (arm-triangle choke)	PFL: Genesis	March 31, 2007	1	0:59	Miami, Florida, United States	Professional debut.
