= Carlos "Carlão" Santos =

Brazilian martial artist

Carlos Alberto Firmino dos Santos
- Born: February 14, 1976 (age 50); Rio de Janeiro, Brazil
- Other names: "Carlão"
- Height: 6 ft 2 in (188 cm)
- Weight: 297 lb (135 kg; 21 st 3 lb)
- Division: Heavyweight
- Style: Brazilian Jiu-Jitsu, Grappling
- Fighting out of: Rio de Janeiro, Brazil
- Team: First BJJ Team
- Rank: 5th degree black belt in Brazilian Jiu-Jitsu

Other information
- Website: carlossantos76.blogspot.com

Carlos "Carlão" Alberto Santos (born February 14, 1976) is a 3-time World Brazilian Jiu-Jitsu heavyweight champion. Santos was the Brazilian Champion in 1995 and 1996, the World Champion in 1996, 1998 and 2000, the Pan American Champion in 2000 and 2001 and the European Champion in 2004.

He served as a head coach of Brazilian Top Team and head coach of Emirates Jiu-Jitsu. He spearheaded Abu-Dhabi's School-Jitsu Project and he created the World Professional Jiu-Jitsu Cup (WPJJC) in Abu Dhabi.

== Career ==
=== Rio de Janeiro, Brazil ===
Santos' Jiu-Jitsu career started in 1993 at the famous Carlson Gracie Academy in Copacabana, Rio de Janeiro, under the supervision of Marcelo Alonso and Marcelo Saporito.

He trained under Carlson Gracie until receiving his brown belt.

Thereafter, Santos became a head coach of Brazilian Top Team (BTT), where he managed the Gi division.

Santos also trained with Luiz Carlos Dias ("Manimal"), Mario Sperry, Murilo Bustamante, Bebeo Duarte and Ricardo Libório. He received his black belt in August 2001.

Santos stayed with BTT until he moved to Abu Dhabi.

=== Abu Dhabi, U.A.E. ===
Santos first visited Abu Dhabi, U.A.E., in January 2002, after the Abu Dhabi Combat Club (ADCC) struck a deal with Brazilian Top Team (BTT) in 2001. The terms of the deal directed BTT to send one of its coaches to Abu Dhabi every month for a one-month stay. After staying for a month on his first visit, Santos moved to Abu Dhabi permanently in August 2002.

Santos was the head coach of Emirates Jiu-Jitsu. The stated goal of Emirates Jiu-Jitsu is to raise awareness of Brazilian Jiu-Jitsu and make the United Arab Emirates the premier venue for this sport in the world, as well as create a community of BJJ athletes that train and compete in the UAE. He is also the President of the Federation International of Jiu-Jitsu Association (FIJJA) that he established in 2009. FIJJA aims at generating financial return to FIJJA and its competing athletes by making jiu-jitsu a profitable business.

Santos implemented BJJ in the local army training, as well as making Jiu Jitsu a mandatory subject in public schools. The Abu Dhabi Jiu-Jitsu Schools initiative, named "School-Jitsu", began in 2008. School-Jitsu and aimed to discover future talent in 14 schools for pupils in grades 6 and 7 (ages 9 to 13). The program has since expanded to 42 government schools, with 81 Brazilian coaches brought in as instructors. The plan is for up to 500 schools to be participating in the School-Jitsu program by 2015. The project was set up by special request of Sheikh Mohammad bin Zayed Al Nahyan to Santos, who is the managing director of the School-Jitsu Project.

==== World Professional Jiu-Jitsu Cup ====
Santos also works on promoting local and regional tournaments. In 2009, with full support of the local government, Santos created the World Professional Jiu-Jitsu Cup (WPJJC) in Abu Dhabi. Since then, WPJCC drew hundreds of high caliber athletes every year, with qualifying athletes receiving all travel expenses to compete in Abu Dhabi. Santos' ultimate goal is to make Brazilian Jiu-Jitsu a professional sport.

=== Later career ===
In May 2011, Santos returned to his home of Brazil after a nine-year stay in U.A.E. In February 2012, Santos launched the Prime Jiu-Jitsu Center in Colorado Springs. On July 11, 2014, Santos launched the First Brazilian Jiu-Jitsu in Salt Lake City, UT .

== Sport accomplishments ==
- 2004 European Champion
- 2nd Place Team Brazilian Champion 2002
- 2nd Place Brazilian Champion 2003 - Black Belt
- 2nd Place Brazilian Champion 2001 - Black Belt
- 2 times Pan American Champion 2000 and 2001
- World Champion 2000 (defeated Walter Pinto)
- World Champion 1998 (defeated Rolles Gracie)
- World Champion 1996 (defeated Fabio Martins)
- Brazilian Champion 1996
- Brazilian Champion 1995
- 2nd Place in Brazilian Championship 1994
