= Marcello Salazar =

Brazilian mixed martial arts fighter

- Born: Marcello Salazar M. Bergo; March 27, 1981 (age 45); Rio de Janeiro, Brazil
- Other names: The Barbarian
- Height: 5 ft 11 in (1.80 m)
- Weight: 185 lb (84 kg; 13.2 st)
- Division: Middleweight
- Fighting out of: Texas, United States
- Team: Brazilian Top Team
- Rank: Black Belt in Brazilian Jiu-Jitsu
- Years active: 2003–2007; 2012

Mixed martial arts record
- Total: 7
- Wins: 4
- By submission: 2
- By decision: 2
- Losses: 1
- By knockout: 1
- Draws: 2

Other information
- Mixed martial arts record from Sherdog

Marcello Salazar M. Bergo (born March 27, 1981) is a Brazilian former mixed martial artist. He is a member of the Brazilian Top Team, and is currently a full-time instructor at Brazilian Top Team-Jacksonville in Jacksonville, Florida.

== Biography ==
Marcello Salazar Bergo was born in Rio de Janeiro, Brazil, on March 27, 1981, to Silvia Helena Mousinho, of Portuguese ancestry and Victor Salazar Bergo, of Italian ancestry.

At the age of 8, Marcello learned Brazilian Jiu Jitsu from Coach Juarez Soares, a methodological specialist in training children. In 2004, Marcello Salazar received his black belt at the age of 24 from Brazilian Top Team founders and head coach Murilo Bustamante and Mario Sperry who received their black belts from the legendary Carlson Gracie.

After conquering various national and international titles in Brazilian Jiu Jitsu, and over 300 submission grappling and wrestling matches to his credit, Marcello made the decision to undertake and compete in MMA. His professional MMA record currently stands at 8 wins and only 1 loss, and avenged that loss in a rematch.

== Mixed martial arts career ==
In his second to last fight he avenged his only professional loss after defeating Alex Cook at the IFL World Grand Prix Finals. The fight went all 3, 4 minute rounds ending in a Unanimous Decision in favor of Salazar. Marcello dominated the entire fight with relentless takedowns and GnP, but was unable to finish.

Marcello has dedicated himself to and represented the Brazilian Top Team with major international success. Marcello has won the Brazilian and Rio de Janeiro State Championships of Jiu Jitsu, the European Submission Wrestling Championship, and—three times—the Brazilian Circuit Championship of Submission Wrestling. He represented Brazil on their Olympic Free Style and Greco Roman Wrestling Teams. Three times he was the Brazilian National Champion of Greco Roman Wrestling; four times the Free Style Wrestling Champion. And in the US, he has won the American Nationals NO-GI in 2008, and took 3rd in the [BJJ World Championships] in 2008. He was undefeated in MMA as an Amateur, and, as a Professional Fighter, he has lost only once— and avenged that loss in a rematch.

He has also competed in an 8-man tournament where he finished all three of his fights by submission in the first round to win the tournament. The event was held on September 23, 2006, in Foz do Iguacu, Brazil, under the International Challenge Championship (ICC) banner.

== Sport accomplishments ==
(Marcello often competes at 82 & 88 kg)

BJJ and Grappling

- ADCC PRO North American BJJ Championship Gi 2009 (ADCC) - First Place
- World Grappling Championship Gi 2008 (FILA) - First Place
- World Grappling Championship No Gi 2008 (FILA) - Second Place
- World BJJ Championship No Gi 2008 (IBJJF) - Third Place
- Pan American BJJ Championship No Gi 2008 (IBJJF) - Third Place
- American BJJ Championship No Gi 2008 (USBJJF) - First Place
- North American Grappling Championship No Gi 2008 (NAGA) - First Place
- European Grappling Championship No Gi 2006 (FFG) - First Place
- Brazilian Grappling Circuit No Gi 2004 / 2005 (SETE/RJ) - First Place
- Abu Dhabi Trials No Gi 2004 (ADCC) - First Place
- BJJ Championship Gi 1999 (CBJJ) - Third Place
- RJ State BJJ Championship Gi 1999 (FJJ/RJ) - First Place
- BJJ Championship Gi 1998 (CBJJ) - First Place

1. ADCC (Abu Dhabi Combat Club) 2. FILA (Fédération Internationale des Luttes Associées) 3. IBJJF (International Brazilian Jiu Jitsu Federation) 4. USBJJF (United States Brazilian Jiu Jitsu Federation) 5. NAGA (North American Grappling Associations) 6. FFG (Fédération Françoise de Grappling) 7. SETE/RJ (Secretaria Estadual de Turismo e Esporte do Rio de Janeiro) 8. CBJJ (Confederação Brasileira de Jiu Jitsu) 9. FJJ/RJ (Federação de Jiu Jitsu do Rio de Janeiro)

Wrestling

- RJ State Freestyle Championship 2004 / 2005 / 2006 (LWERJ) - First Place
- RJ State Greco Roman Championship 2004 / 2005 / 2006 (LWERJ) - First Place
- Greco Roman Olympic Circuit 2003 (COB) - First Place
- Freestyle Olympic Circuit 2003 (COB) - First Place
- Brazilian Greco Roman Championship 2003 (CBLA) - First Place
- Brazilian Freestyle Championship 2002 / 2003 (CBLA) - First Place
- Brazilian Freestyle Jr Championship 2001 (CBLA) - First Place
- RJ Greco Roman Championship 2001 (FLOAERJ) - First Place
- RJ Freestyle Championship 2001 (FLOAERJ) - First Place

1. LWERJ (Liga de Wrestling do Estado do Rio de Janeiro) 2. COB (Comitê Olímpico Brasileiro) 3. CBLA (Confederação Brasileira de lutas Associadas) 4. FLOAERJ (Federação de Lutas Olímpicas e Associadas do Estado do Rio de Janeiro)

MMA (Mixed Martial Arts)

- World Grand Prix Finals 2007 (IFL) - Winner
- Shoot Revolution 2007 - Winner
- Eight Men Grand Prix 2006 (ICC) - Winner Three Times
- Staredown City 2006 - Winner
- Conquista Fight 2003 - Winner

1. IFL (International Fight League) 2. ICC (International Challenge Championship)

== Mixed martial arts record ==
Professional record breakdown
7 matches	4 wins	1 loss
By knockout	0	1
By submission	2	0
By decision	2	0
Draws	2	

Res.	Record	Opponent	Method	Event	Date	Round	Time	Location	Notes
Win	4–1–2	Dimitry Burgo	Submission (kimura)	MMAAD: MMA Against Dengue 2	March 4, 2012	1	3:27	Rio de Janeiro, Brazil	
Win	3–1–2	Alex Cook	Decision (unanimous)	IFL: World Grand Prix Finals 2007	December 29, 2007	3	4:00	Uncasville, Connecticut, United States	
Draw	2–1–2	Paul Jenkins	Draw (majority)	CWFC: Showdown	September 16, 2006	3	5:00	Sheffield, England, United Kingdom	
Draw	2–1–1	Karl Amoussou	Draw	Championnat D'Europe	May 6, 2006	2	N/A	Geneva, Switzerland	
Loss	2–1	Alex Cook	TKO (punches)	CWFC: Strike Force 5	March 25, 2006	2	3:02	Coventry, England, United Kingdom	
Win	2–0	Xander Nel	Submission (kimura)	SC: Staredown City	February 5, 2006	1	N/A	Holland, Netherlands	
Win	1–0	Alexandre Lima	Decision (unanimous)	CF 1: Conquista Fight 1	December 20, 2003	3	5:00	Bahia, Brazil	

== Personal life ==
Marcello has an older brother and a twin sister. His daughter was born in 2008, a son in 2011, daughter in 2019, a daughter in 2021, a son in 2024 and a daughter in 2026. In 2007, Marcello Salazar earned a bachelor's degree history from UGF University, Rio de Janeiro. He is currently the head instructor at Brazilian Top Team Jacksonville. He is also currently a police officer as an academy instructor for the Jacksonville Sherriff's Office and was formerly a member of the SWAT team.
