= Carlão =

Carlão may refer to:

== People ==
A nickname for people with given name Carlos, such as:

- Carlão (rapper) (born 1975), previously known as Pacman, Da Weasel's lead MC
- Carlão (footballer, born January 1986), full name Carlos Roberto da Cruz Júnior, Brazilian footballer
- Carlão (footballer, born August 1986), full name Carlos Alexandre Souza Silva, Brazilian footballer
- Carlão (footballer, born 1992), full name Carlos Henrique de Moura Brito, Brazilian footballer
- Carlão (footballer, born 2001), full name Carlos Eduardo da Silva Santos, Brazilian footballer
- Carlos Barreto (born 1968), Brazilian MMA fighter
- Antônio Gouveia (born 1965), Brazilian volleyball player
- Carlos "Carlão" Santos (born 1976), Brazilian jiu-jitsu heavyweight champion

== Places ==
- Carlão e Amieiro, a civil parish of Alijó Municipality, Portugal

== See also ==
- Carlos (disambiguation)
