= Denis Kang =

Canadian mixed martial arts fighter (born 1977)

- Kang (pictured right) at weigh-ins in November 2009
- Born: September 17, 1977 (age 49); Saint-Pierre, Saint Pierre and Miquelon
- Nationality: Canadian
- Height: 5 ft 11 in (1.80 m)
- Weight: 185 lb (84 kg; 13.2 st)
- Division: Heavyweight; Light Heavyweight; Middleweight
- Reach: 77.0 in (196 cm)
- Fighting out of: North Vancouver, British Columbia, Canada; Montreal, Quebec, Canada
- Team: American Top Team; Zahabi MMA; Tristar Gym
- Rank: 5th deg. BJJ black belt under Marcus Soares
- Years active: 1998–2013

Kickboxing record
- Total: 1
- Wins: 0
- Losses: 1
- By knockout: 1
- Draws: 0

Mixed martial arts record
- Total: 55
- Wins: 35
- By knockout: 15
- By submission: 14
- By decision: 6
- Losses: 16
- By knockout: 6
- By submission: 8
- By decision: 2
- Draws: 2
- No contests: 2

Other information
- Website: www.deniskang.com
- Mixed martial arts record from Sherdog

- Denis Kang
- Hangul: 강대수
- RR: Gang Daesu
- MR: Kang Taesu

Denis Kang (born September 17, 1977) is a retired Canadian professional mixed martial artist who most recently competed in the Middleweight division. A professional competitor since 1998, Kang has formerly competed for the UFC, PRIDE, DREAM, Impact FC, M-1 Global, K-1 HERO'S, ROAD FC, and Pancrase. In his prime he was ranked one of the top fighters in the world and scored notable wins over Pat Healy, Marvin Eastman, Akihiro Gono and Murilo Rua.

== Background ==
Kang was born in the French overseas collectivity of Saint Pierre and Miquelon to a Korean father and French mother. He and his family relocated to the Canary Islands and finally North Vancouver, British Columbia, Canada, in 1988 when he was 11 years old. During this period Kang trained multiple martial arts styles. such as Wrestling, Judo, Taekwondo, and Kyokushin Karate. After some years from their arrival to Vancouver, he started taking Hapkido lessons by encouragement of his parents. Kang transitioned into Brazilian Jiu-Jitsu and Kickboxing in high school because he wanted to improve in his ground game more than practice self-defense.

== Mixed martial arts career ==
=== Early career ===
Kang's MMA career began in 1998 at the Ultimate Warrior Challenge in Vancouver, British Columbia, Canada. Kang was successful in his debut fight, winning by submission (rear naked choke) over Eric Harcrow. Kang would go on to win his next 2 fights before going 2–5 over his next 8 with one no contest against Dennis Hallman. He would go 7–7 with one no contest in his first 15 fights, with a few convincing defeats.

After winning five of his next six fights, Kang signed a contract with Spirit MC, a South Korea MMA organization. Denis went 5–0 while fighting in Korea and was crowned the Spirit MC Heavyweight Champion. Following this, Denis relocated to Florida and joined American Top Team.

It was at this time that Kang caught the attention of the PRIDE Fighting Championships. Kang signed a contract with PRIDE and made his debut at PRIDE Bushido 6, where he defeated Japanese opponent Takahiro Oba via armbar at 4:24 of round one. Under the Korean banner, Denis went on to win his next two fights in PRIDE, with a victory coming over Englishman Mark Weir at PRIDE Bushido 10. In between fights for Pride, Denis fought American Albert Basconcelles and knocked him out within 12 seconds of the opening bell. At Bushido 11, Kang continued his winning streak by knocking out Chute Boxe member Murilo "Ninja" Rua in 15 seconds in the first round of the PRIDE Bushido Welterweight (183 lb) Grand Prix. At Bushido 12, Denis submitted Armenian Amar Suloev via rear naked choke to advance to the semi-final round of the Welterweight Grand Prix. With this win, Kang was then 18–0–1 in his last 19 contests. However, after advancing through the semi-final round of the Bushido tournament and beating Akihiro Gono on November 5, 2006, he was defeated by Kazuo Misaki in the final at Bushido 13. Kang had torn his right biceps muscle earlier that night in his win over Gono.

Kang had only one match in 2007 after breaking his hand (an injury that will reappear over and over again) in a match against Jungkyu Choi for the Spirit MC Heavyweight Championship on March 11. Kang won via unanimous decision but was unable to compete for several months.

After the contract termination of PRIDE, Kang moved to K-1 Hero's maintaining the championship of Spirit MC. Kang made his K-1 Hero's debut on October 28, 2007, in "K-1 Hero's in Seoul". His opponent was Yoshihiro Akiyama who was returning to MMA after a 10-month suspension. Kang lost via TKO.

Kang next fight was on April 29, 2008, in the opening round of the Dream 2: Middleweight Grand Prix 2008 First Round, losing to Gegard Mousasi via triangle choke.

On August 30, 2008, Kang defended his Spirit MC Heavyweight Championship by defeating Kim Jae Young by TKO due to strikes at 1:31 of the first round.

Kang defeated UFC veteran Marvin Eastman by TKO on October 25, 2008, at "Raw Combat: Redemption" in Calgary, Alberta, Canada. The fight lasted 48 seconds.

=== Ultimate Fighting Championship ===
Kang made his UFC debut on January 17, 2009, against Alan Belcher despite suffering from ankle injury. Although Kang controlled the fight, he lost by guillotine choke at the end of round two after a takedown attempt.

Kang redeemed himself with a victory over Xavier Foupa-Pokam at UFC 97 by unanimous decision.

Kang faced Michael Bisping on November 14, 2009, at UFC 105. In an interview about his fight with Bisping, Kang revealed he wanted a title fight with Anderson Silva. Bisping TKO'd Kang in the 2nd round. Even though Bisping was the crowd favorite in his home town Manchester and Kang was being booed on, Kang dropped Bisping with a right hand in the first round. Kang followed Bisping to the floor and attempted submissions, but Bisping defended well and neutralised Kang's attacks despite Kang briefly having full mount. In the 2nd round Bisping secured a single-leg takedown and the momentum of the fight shifted : he unleashed a vicious ground and pound attack on the Canadian, which Kang failed to recover from. The fight was awarded Fight of the Night honours, giving both Kang and Bisping a $40,000 bonus check.

Kang was cut from the UFC on Dec. 9 2009, along with Brock Larson, Rolando Delgado and Jason Dent. Kang announced that he had signed with W1 MMA, and that he would fight for their vacant middleweight title on December 18, 2010, in Montreal, Quebec.

=== Post-UFC ===
Denis defeated Dae Won Kim at W-1: Judgment day. Kang faced off against former WEC Middleweight Champion Paulo Filho on July 18, 2010, at an Impact Fighting Championships event. The fight was declared a split draw.

Denis joined the Korean MMA promotion ROAD FC by signing a multi-fight non-exclusive deal.

Denis lost to Melvin Manhoef by KO due to a knee to the body early in the first round of their DREAM 18 New Year's Eve fight at the end of 2012.

== Professional grappling career ==
Kang competed in the first ADCC North American trial in 2002, winning gold in the under 88 kg division. This earned him an invite to ADCC 2003, where he lost on points to Reese Andy in the opening round.

== Personal life ==
Kang has two younger brothers. His youngest brother Julien is an actor and model based in South Korea.

== Championships and accomplishments ==
=== Mixed martial arts ===
- PRIDE Fighting Championships
  - 2006 PRIDE Welterweight Grand Prix Runner-Up
- Spirit MC
  - Spirit MC Heavyweight (+80 kg) Championship (One time; Last)
  - Spirit MC Grand Prix 2004 Championship
- Ultimate Fighting Championship
  - Fight of the Night (One time)
- ROAD FC
  - Fight of the Night (One time)

== Mixed martial arts record ==
Professional record breakdown
55 matches	35 wins	16 losses
By knockout	15	6
By submission	14	8
By decision	6	2
Draws	2	
No contests	2	

Res.	Record	Opponent	Method	Event	Date	Round	Time	Location	Notes
Loss	35–16–2 (2)	Melvin Manhoef	TKO (knee to the body)	DREAM 18	December 31, 2012	1	0:50	Tokyo, Japan	
Win	35–15–2 (2)	Hae Suk Son	KO (punches)	Road FC 8: Bitter Rivals	June 16, 2012	1	4:57	Wonju, South Korea	
Loss	34–15–2 (2)	Shungo Oyama	TKO (knees)	Road FC 5: Night of Champions	December 3, 2011	1	4:30	Seoul, South Korea	
Loss	34–14–2 (2)	Seung Bae Whi	TKO (knees)	Road FC 3: Explosion	July 24, 2011	2	3:58	Seoul, South Korea	Catchweight (190 lbs) bout.
Loss	34–13–2 (2)	Jesse Taylor	Submission (rear-naked choke)	Battlefield Fight League 8: Island Beatdown	May 28, 2011	1	1:57	Nanaimo, British Columbia, Canada	
Win	34–12–2 (2)	Eun Soo Lee	Decision (unanimous)	Road FC 2: Alive	April 16, 2011	3	5:00	Seoul, South Korea	Light Heavyweight bout.
Draw	33–12–2 (2)	Paulo Filho	Draw (split)	Impact FC 2	July 18, 2010	3	5:00	Sydney, Australia	
Win	33–12–1 (2)	Dae Won Kim	Submission (arm-triangle choke)	W-1: Judgment day	June 19, 2010	1	1:49	Laval, Quebec, Canada	
Loss	32–12–1 (2)	Michael Bisping	TKO (knees to the body & punches)	UFC 105	November 14, 2009	2	4:24	Manchester, England	Fight of the Night.
Win	32–11–1 (2)	Xavier Foupa-Pokam	Decision (unanimous)	UFC 97	April 18, 2009	3	5:00	Montreal, Quebec, Canada	
Loss	31–11–1 (2)	Alan Belcher	Submission (guillotine choke)	UFC 93	January 17, 2009	2	4:36	Dublin, Ireland	
Win	31–10–1 (2)	Marvin Eastman	KO (punches)	Raw Combat: Redemption	October 25, 2008	1	0:48	Calgary, Alberta, Canada	
Win	30–10–1 (2)	Jae Young Kim	KO (punches and stomp)	Spirit MC	August 30, 2008	1	1:13	Seoul, South Korea	Defended the Spirit MC Heavyweight (+80 kg) Championship.
Loss	29–10–1 (2)	Gegard Mousasi	Submission (triangle choke)	Dream 2: Middleweight Grand Prix 2008 First Round	April 29, 2008	1	3:10	Saitama, Japan	DREAM Middleweight Grand Prix Opening Round.
Loss	29–9–1 (2)	Yoshihiro Akiyama	KO (punches)	Hero's 2007 in Korea	October 27, 2007	1	4:45	Seoul, South Korea	
Win	29–8–1 (2)	Jung Gyu Choi	Decision (majority)	Spirit MC	March 11, 2007	3	5:00	Seoul, South Korea	Heavyweight bout; defended the Spirit MC Heavyweight (+80 kg) Championship.
Loss	28–8–1 (2)	Kazuo Misaki	Decision (split)	PRIDE Bushido 13	November 5, 2006	3	5:00	Yokohama, Japan	PRIDE 2006 Welterweight Grand Prix Final.
Win	28–7–1 (2)	Akihiro Gono	Decision (unanimous)	PRIDE Bushido 13	November 5, 2006	2	5:00	Yokohama, Japan	PRIDE 2006 Welterweight Grand Prix Semifinal.
Win	27–7–1 (2)	Amar Suloev	Submission (one-arm strangle)	PRIDE Bushido 12	August 26, 2006	1	4:10	Nagoya, Japan	PRIDE 2006 Welterweight Grand Prix Quarterfinal.
Win	26–7–1 (2)	Murilo Rua	KO (punches)	PRIDE Bushido 11	June 4, 2006	1	0:15	Saitama, Japan	PRIDE 2006 Welterweight Grand Prix Opening Round.
Win	25–7–1 (2)	Albert Basconcelles	TKO (punches)	Spirit MC	April 22, 2006	1	0:12	Seoul, South Korea	Heavyweight bout.
Win	24–7–1 (2)	Mark Weir	TKO (submission to knees)	PRIDE Bushido 10	April 2, 2006	1	4:55	Tokyo, Japan	
Win	23–7–1 (2)	Ron Fields	Submission (rear-naked choke)	Absolute Fighting Championships 14	December 10, 2005	1	2:46	Fort Lauderdale, Florida, United States	
NC	22–7–1 (2)	Robert Villegas	No Contest	Spirit MC	October 29, 2005	1	0:00	Seoul, South Korea	
Win	22–7–1 (1)	Andrei Semenov	Decision (unanimous)	PRIDE Bushido 8	July 17, 2005	2	5:00	Nagoya, Japan	
Win	21–7–1 (1)	Takahiro Oba	Submission (armbar)	PRIDE Bushido 6	April 3, 2005	1	4:24	Yokohama, Japan	
Win	20–7–1 (1)	Alexei Vezelozorov	Submission (choke)	M-1 MFC: Heavyweight GP	December 4, 2004	1	1:17	Moscow, Russia	Return to Middleweight.
Win	19–7–1 (1)	Jin Ho Yang	TKO (punches)	Spirit MC	September 11, 2004	1	0:49	Seoul, South Korea	Spirit MC Grand Prix 2004 Final; Won the Spirit MC Heavyweight (+80 kg) Championship.
Win	18–7–1 (1)	Jae Young Kim	Submission (arm-triangle choke)	Spirit MC	September 11, 2004	1	1:38	Seoul, South Korea	Spirit MC Grand Prix 2004 Semifinal.
Win	17–7–1 (1)	Junpei Hamada	Submission (armbar)	Spirit MC	September 11, 2004	1	2:35	Seoul, South Korea	Spirit MC Grand Prix 2004 Quarterfinal.
Win	16–7–1 (1)	Kobus Huisamen	TKO (punches)	Spirit MC	June 12, 2004	1	1:06	Seoul, South Korea	
Win	15–7–1 (1)	Hyun Chul Cho	Submission (rear-naked choke)	Spirit MC	April 10, 2004	1	2:06	Seoul, South Korea	
Win	14–7–1 (1)	Hyung Jun Kim	TKO (punches)	Spirit MC	February 7, 2004	1	1:13	Seoul, South Korea	
Win	13–7–1 (1)	Jae Young Kim	TKO (punches)	Spirit MC	February 7, 2004	1	0:38	Seoul, South Korea	Return to Heavyweight.
Draw	12–7–1 (1)	Andrei Semenov	Draw	M-1 MFC: Russia vs. The World 7	December 5, 2003	1	10:00	St. Petersburg, Russia	
Win	12–7 (1)	Stephan Potvin	TKO (punches)	TKO Major League MMA	September 6, 2003	3	2:22	Montreal, Quebec, Canada	
Win	11–7 (1)	Kaipo Kalama	Decision (majority)	SB 30: Collision Course	June 13, 2003	3	3:00	Honolulu, Hawaii, United States	
Win	10–7 (1)	Brendan Seguin	Submission (armbar)	SB 30: Collision Course	June 13, 2003	1	2:24	Honolulu, Hawaii, United States	
Win	9–7 (1)	Keith Rockel	KO (punch)	USMMA 3: Ring of Fury	May 3, 2003	2	2:59	Boston, Massachusetts, United States	Catchweight (195 lbs) bout.
Win	8–7 (1)	Chris Peak	Submission (rear-naked choke)	World Freestyle Fighting 4	April 4, 2003	1	0:57	Kelowna, British Columbia, Canada	
Loss	7–7 (1)	Jason Miller	Submission (rear-naked choke)	Extreme Challenge 50	February 23, 2003	2	1:41	Salt Lake City, Utah, United States	
Loss	7–6 (1)	Joe Doerksen	Submission (triangle choke)	UCC 11: The Next Level	October 11, 2002	1	4:49	Montreal, Quebec, Canada	
Win	7–5 (1)	Pat Healy	Submission (guillotine choke)	Rumble in the Ring 7	July 20, 2002	1	3:42	Auburn, Washington, United States	
Win	6–5 (1)	Shane Biever	Submission (armlock)	World Freestyle Fighting 2	June 22, 2002	1	3:03	Kelowna, British Columbia, Canada	
NC	5–5 (1)	Dennis Hallman	No Contest	World Freestyle Fighting 1	April 13, 2002	2	3:15	Kelowna, British Columbia, Canada	Hallman accidentally headbutted Kang and opened a cut above the eye.
Loss	5–5	Marty Armendarez	TKO (punches)	IFC WC 15: Warriors Challenge 15	August 31, 2001	3	3:45	Oroville, California, United States	Return to Middleweight.
Loss	5–4	Osami Shibuya	Submission (rear-naked choke)	Pancrase: Proof 3	May 13, 2001	1	3:52	Tokyo, Japan	Heavyweight debut.
Loss	5–3	Keiichiro Yamamiya	Decision (majority)	Pancrase: Trans 7	December 4, 2000	2	3:00	Tokyo, Japan	Light Heavyweight debut.
Win	5–2	Minoru Suzuki	TKO (back injury)	Pancrase: 2000 Anniversary Show	September 24, 2000	1	3:43	Yokohama, Japan	
Win	4–2	Lonnie Canida	TKO (punches)	Western Canada's Toughest	March 18, 2000	1	4:06	Kelowna, British Columbia, Canada	
Loss	3–2	Joe Slick	Submission (arm-triangle choke)	Extreme Challenge 24	May 15, 1999	1	5:53	Salt Lake City, Utah, United States	
Loss	3–1	Jacen Flynn	Submission (guillotine choke)	Bas Rutten Invitational 2	April 24, 1999	1	4:07	Littleton, Colorado, United States	
Win	3–0	Tom Bolger	Submission (triangle choke)	Bas Rutten Invitational 2	April 24, 1999	1	1:55	Littleton, Colorado, United States	
Win	2–0	Fadi Habib	TKO (punches)	Ultimate Warrior Challenge 2	November 1, 1998	1	0:53	Vancouver, British Columbia, Canada	
Win	1–0	Eric Harcrow	Submission (rear-naked choke)	Ultimate Warrior Challenge	August 2, 1998	1	0:15	Vancouver, British Columbia, Canada	

== Kickboxing record ==
Kickboxing record
0 wins, 1 loss
Result	Opponent	Method	Event	Date	Round	Time	Location	Notes
Loss	(Thailand) Kaoklai Kaennorsing	KO (Right Hook)	K-1 World Grand Prix 2004 in Seoul	July 7, 2004	1	1:48	Seoul, South Korea	

Legend: Win Loss Draw/No contest

== Submission grappling record ==
Result	Opponent	Method	Event	Date	Round	Time	Notes
Loss	(United States) Reese Andy	Points	2003 ADCC (Under 87.9 kg)				

== See also ==
- List of male mixed martial artists
- List of Brazilian jiu-jitsu practitioners
- List of Canadian UFC fighters
