= CBJJO World Jiu-Jitsu Cup =

Brazilian Jiu-Jitsu competitions

World Jiu-Jitsu Cup
Competition details
- Local name(s): Copa do Mundo de Jiu-Jitsu
- Discipline: Brazilian jiu-jitsu
- Organiser: CBJJO

History
- First edition: 2002
- Final edition: 2007

The World Jiu-Jitsu Cup, CBJJO World Jiu-Jitsu Cup or CBJJO World Cup, was a Brazilian jiu-jitsu tournament established in 2002 as an alternative to the World IBJJF Jiu-Jitsu Championship. Its last edition took place in 2007 in Teresópolis, Brazil.

== History ==
On 22 February 2002, Andre Pederneiras helped by Luiz Herminio, one of the sponsors of the Nova União team, created the CBJJO (Confederacao Brasileira de Jiu Jitsu Olimpico or Brazilian Confederation of Olympic Jiu Jitsu), a new Jiu Jitsu federation to rival the IBJJF (International Brazilian Jiu Jitsu Federation). Its main tournament was called Copa do Mundo de Jiu Jitsu (World Jiu Jitsu Cup) and took place on the same weekend as the World IBJJF Jiu-Jitsu Championship. The main difference was that, unlike the IBJJF championship, winners of the CBJJO tournament were offered prize money. The first event took place in 2002 at Ginásio do Hebraica in Rio de Janeiro. The 2007 World Cup, held at Ginásio do Pedrão, in Teresópolis, was the last World Cup organised before the CBJJO was dissolved.

The creation of the World Jiu-Jitsu Cup provoked many disputes between academies, starting when Nova União‘s lightweight team stopped competing in IBJJF tournaments. It also led to the creation of new teams, most notably the Master team formed after Alliance jiu-jitsu's Fabio Gurgel expelled its fighters who had competed at the World Cup. (Note: Members of the Master went to create some of today's top jiu-jitsu teams, such as Brasa team, Checkmat, Zenith BJJ, or Atos Jiu-Jitsu.)
