= Paulo Filho =

Brazilian mixed martial arts fighter

- Born: May 24, 1978 (age 48); Rio de Janeiro, Brazil
- Other names: Ely
- Height: 5 ft 8 in (1.73 m)
- Weight: 185 lb (84 kg; 13.2 st)
- Division: Middleweight; Light Heavyweight; Heavyweight
- Reach: 70 in (180 cm)
- Style: Brazilian jiu-jitsu
- Stance: Southpaw
- Fighting out of: Rio de Janeiro, Brazil
- Team: Brazilian Top Team (until 2007, 2010–present)
- Rank: Black belt in Brazilian jiu-jitsu under Carlson Gracie; Black belt in Judo
- Years active: 2000–2014

Mixed martial arts record
- Total: 32
- Wins: 23
- By knockout: 5
- By submission: 8
- By decision: 10
- Losses: 6
- By decision: 6
- Draws: 3

Other information
- Mixed martial arts record from Sherdog

Paulo Filho
Medal record

Representing Brazil

Brazilian Jiu-Jitsu

World Championships
Gold medal – first place	1997 Rio de Janeiro	-94kg
Silver medal – second place	1998 Rio de Janeiro	-94kg
Silver medal – second place	1999 Rio de Janeiro	-94kg

Paulo Filho (Portuguese pronunciation: [ˈpawlu ˈfiʎu]; born May 24, 1978), is a Brazilian retired mixed martial artist who last competed in the Middleweight division. A professional competitor from 2000 until 2014, Filho was the last WEC Middleweight Champion, and also competed in PRIDE, DREAM, Pancrase, DEEP, Impact FC, and the World Series of Fighting.

== Background ==
Filho was born in Governador Island to a Jewish-Brazilian dad and a Pernambuco native mom, in Rio de Janeiro, he is the only child and was raised in Cocota until he and his family moved to Zona Sul when Filho was eight years old. It was soon after moving to Copacabana in the Zona Sul area of Rio de Janeiro when Filho began training in Brazilian jiu-jitsu at the Carlson Gracie academy, and then also began training in judo, and later mixed martial arts. He did extremely well in judo competitions and also in jiu-jitsu competitions becoming one of Gracie's proteges and he received his black belt in jiu-jitsu from Carlson himself when he was 20 years old. Filho has stated in several interviews that his career's goal have always been to defend jiu-jitsu and specially the Gracie Family as a whole. He has stated that "It is because of this family that I have everything in my life and for that I am forever grateful". He is well respected in the Brazilian Jiu-Jitsu community not just from fans but from high level competitors that have trained with him and consider him to be one of the best in the world. Filho is also a pit bull lover and has a pit bull tattoo in his stomach.

== Mixed martial arts career ==
=== PRIDE Fighting Championships ===
During his stint in PRIDE, Filho was the only undefeated entrant in the 2006 PRIDE Welterweight Grand Prix, but he did not win the tournament as an injury kept him from the tournament finals. In the semi-finals of the tournament on PRIDE Bushido 13, November 5, 2006, Filho defeated Kazuo Misaki by armbar. Unfortunately, Filho suffered a ruptured membrane in his knee during the fight, forcing him to withdraw from the Grand Prix finals match against Denis Kang, who also suffered injury with a torn biceps in the semi-finals. Filho was replaced by Misaki, who went on to defeat an already injured Kang and claim the Grand Prix title. Filho's most notable wins include Kazuo Misaki, Amar Suloev and Yuki Kondo, as well as Murilo Rua and Ikuhisa Minowa.

=== World Extreme Cagefighting ===
He signed with the World Extreme Cagefighting and fought for the vacant middleweight title on August 5, 2007, at WEC 29. Filho defeated Canadian jiu-jitsu fighter Joe Doerksen via TKO (strikes) at 4:07 of the first round. His first title defense occurred at WEC 31, where he was awarded a controversial win over 2-time National Wrestling Champion Chael Sonnen by armbar at 4:55 in the second round. Due to controversy stemming from the fight stoppage (Sonnen's screams of pain were taken as a verbal submission by the referee, despite his objections), Filho was scheduled to face Sonnen again at WEC 33. However, Filho pulled out of this bout because he had checked into a substance abuse rehab facility. Filho faced Sonnen at WEC 36 on November 5 live on Versus. Filho missed weight for this match, however the contest went ahead as a non-title three round fight. Sonnen dominated the fight and took a unanimous decision victory. Throughout the fight Filho seemed disturbed, disoriented, and confused and his team has associated the episode with his extreme weigh cut. After the WEC's middleweight division was absorbed into the Ultimate Fighting Championship in December 2008, Filho became a free agent and decided to take time off as he felt he lost the love for fighting.

=== DREAM ===
Filho made his DREAM debut on July 20, 2009, when he took on light heavyweight Melvin Manhoef at Dream 10 in Saitama, Japan. Filho showed great perseverance and a good chin in the fight, weathering an onslaught of strikes from the dangerous Manhoef before executing a powerful takedown that immediately put him in half guard, from which he then swiftly transitioned into a full mount whilst at the same time trapping Melvin's left arm; he quickly secured an armbar to win the bout in the first round.

Filho was scheduled to face Yoon Dong-Sik on October 25, 2009, at Dream 12, but failed to show up and was replaced on the card.

=== Bitetti Combat ===
Filho made his debut in one of Brazil's top promotions, Bitetti Combat, on September 12, 2009, at Bitetti Combat's 4th event against Argentinian Alex Schoenauer. Filho controlled throughout the whole fight and pulled off a unanimous decision. He then fought Tatsuhiko Nishizaka on December 12, 2009, at Bitetti Combat 5. He easily took the fight to the ground, controlled and secured a Kimura in the very first round.

He was scheduled to fight Yuki Sasaki in the main event at Bitetti Combat 6 on February 25, 2010, but it was announced on February 22 that he had withdrawn from the bout due to "personal problems". Later that day, it was confirmed that Filho would in fact be fighting Sasaki. Filho then failed to show for the event's weigh-in, forcing a last minute cancellation of his bout with Sasaki.

=== Bellator Fighting Championships ===
Filho was scheduled to face Bellator Fighting Championships Middleweight champion Hector Lombard in a non-title bout on May 13, 2010, at Bellator 18, but Filho pulled out of the bout due to visa issues and was replaced by Jay Silva.

=== Future ===
Filho made his Heavyweight debut and defeated Chilean newcomer Daniel Villegas on June 4, 2010, via first-round submission due to strikes. Filho faced Denis Kang on July 17, 2010, for the Australian-based promotion Impact Fighting Championships. They fought to a draw. In what came as a surprise decision to many, Filho was invited to participate in the ADCC submission grappling championship in Nottingham, England. Filho withdrew prior to the event due to injury. Paulo fought Satoshi Ishii on September 14, 2011. The bout was ruled a draw.

=== Retirement ===
On October 19, 2011 Filho made the announcement he would be retiring from Mixed Martial Arts and may or may not fight at KSW. During an interview Filho stated the reason for his retirement was his long struggle with substance abuse, he regretted that he was so far from where he could have been in MMA.

=== Back from retirement ===
Filho returned from retirement to face former UFC fighter Dave Branch in the World Series of Fighting 2 event on March 23, 2013. Filho was dominated by Branch in every aspect of the fight and lost a unanimous decision. Filho fought André Muniz at the Bitetti Combat 19 event on February 6, 2014. He again lost via a one sided unanimous decision.

Following Melvin Manhoef's knockout of Evangelista Santos at Gringo Superfight 10, Filho, who won their first outing by submission, entered the cage and challenged Manhoef to a rematch. Though Manhoef wasn't asked about the possible fight before the challenge, he later accepted, and GSF promoter Antonio Tolentino announced the rematch would take place in November 2014.

Filho was expected to face Amilcar Alves at Fatality Arena 7 on September 21, 2014. However, Filho was pulled from the bout due to an apparent seizure. In an interview with MMAFighting.com, Filho stated that it was personal issues that prevented him from competing. Filho's trainer and personal friend Murilo Bustamante has stated that Filho has not "stepped foot at the academy pre-fight" to most of his bouts since WEC days.

=== Car accident ===
In 2017 Filho fractured his hip socket and left hand following a car accident where he crashed into another car. He has made a full recovery and spends his time now speaking with children and teaching Jiu-Jitsu in Rio de Janeiro.

== Championships and accomplishments ==
=== Brazilian jiu-jitsu ===
- CBJJ World Championships
  - 1999
    - Black Belt Pesado: 2nd Place
  - 1998
    - Brown Belt Pesado: 2nd Place
  - 1997
    - Purple Belt Pesado: 1st Place
- CBJJ Brazilian Championships
  - 2000
    - Black Belt Pesado: 2nd Place
  - 1999
    - Black Belt Pesado: 2nd Place
  - 1998
    - Brown Belt Pesado: 1st Place
  - 1996
    - Blue Belt Pesadíssimo: 1st Place

He got his Black Belt in Judo in '96 from Clube de Regatas Flamengo. His black belt in BJJ was awarded in 1998, from Carlson Gracie.

=== Mixed martial arts ===
- PRIDE Fighting Championships
  - 2006 PRIDE Welterweight Grand Prix Finalist
- World Extreme Cagefighting
  - WEC Middleweight Championship (One time, Last)
    - One successful title defense

=== Submission grappling ===
- Abu Dhabi Combat Club
  - 2005 ADCC Brazilian Trials Champion

== Mixed martial arts record ==
Professional record breakdown
32 matches	23 wins	6 losses
By knockout	5	0
By submission	8	0
By decision	10	6
Draws	3	

Res.	Record	Opponent	Method	Event	Date	Round	Time	Location	Notes
Win	24–6–3	Mohammad Ashraf Gahi	Submission (arm-triangle choke)	Wawan MMA 16	May 10, 2018	1	1:55	Kuwait City, Kuwait	Heavyweight bout.
Loss	23–6–3	André Muniz	Decision (unanimous)	Bitetti Combat 19	February 6, 2014	3	5:00	Manaus, Amazonas, Brazil	For the Bitetti Combat Middleweight Championship.
Draw	23–5–3	Rodney Wallace	Draw (time limit expired)	Selva MMA 2	August 4, 2013	3	5:00	Rio Branco, Brazil	Bout declared a draw due to expiration of time and lack of judges.
Loss	23–5–2	David Branch	Decision (unanimous)	World Series of Fighting 2	March 23, 2013	3	5:00	Atlantic City, New Jersey, United States	
Win	23–4–2	Murilo Rua	TKO (punches)	Best of the Best: Filho vs. Ninja II	September 6, 2012	1	0:47	Belém, Brazil	
Draw	22–4–2	Satoshi Ishii	Draw	Amazon Forest Combat 1	September 14, 2011	3	5:00	Manaus, Brazil	Light Heavyweight bout.
Loss	22–4–1	Norman Paraisy	Decision (unanimous)	X-Combat Ultra: International Grand Prix	May 20, 2011	3	5:00	Rio de Janeiro, Brazil	
Loss	22–3–1	Ronny Markes	Decision (unanimous)	International Fighter Championship	April 29, 2011	3	5:00	Recife, Brazil	Light Heavyweight bout.
Win	22–2–1	Jackson Mora	Decision (split)	World Fighting Combat: Pretorian	March 19, 2011	3	5:00	Rio de Janeiro, Brazil	
Win	21–2–1	Yuki Sasaki	Decision (unanimous)	Bitetti Combat 8	December 4, 2010	3	5:00	São Paulo, Brazil	
Loss	20–2–1	Marcos Rogério de Lima	Decision (unanimous)	First Class Fight 5	October 23, 2010	3	5:00	São Paulo, Brazil	Light Heavyweight bout.
Draw	20–1–1	Denis Kang	Draw (split)	Impact FC 2	July 18, 2010	3	5:00	Sydney, Australia	Middleweight bout.
Win	20–1	Daniel Villegas	TKO (submission to punches)	Memorial Fight Qualifying	June 4, 2010	1	N/A	São Paulo, Brazil	Heavyweight bout. Originally scheduled as a Light Heavyweight bout, however Filho weighed in at 218 lbs.
Win	19–1	Tatsuhiko Nishizaka	Submission (kimura)	Bitetti Combat 5	December 12, 2009	1	3:00	Barueri, Brazil	Light Heavyweight bout.
Win	18–1	Alex Schoenauer	Decision (unanimous)	Bitetti Combat 4	September 12, 2009	3	5:00	Rio de Janeiro, Brazil	Light Heavyweight bout.
Win	17–1	Melvin Manhoef	Submission (armbar)	DREAM 10	July 20, 2009	1	2:35	Saitama, Saitama, Japan	
Loss	16–1	Chael Sonnen	Decision (unanimous)	WEC 36: Faber vs. Brown	November 5, 2008	3	5:00	Hollywood, Florida, United States	Non-title bout; Filho missed weight (192 lbs).
Win	16–0	Chael Sonnen	Submission (armbar)	WEC 31	December 12, 2007	2	4:55	Las Vegas, Nevada, United States	Defended the WEC Middleweight Championship.
Win	15–0	Joe Doerksen	TKO (punches)	WEC 29	August 5, 2007	1	4:07	Las Vegas, Nevada, United States	Won the vacant WEC Middleweight Championship.
Win	14–0	Kazuo Misaki	Submission (armbar)	PRIDE Bushido 13	November 5, 2006	1	9:43	Yokohama, Japan	PRIDE 2006 Welterweight Grand Prix Semifinal.
Win	13–0	Ryo Chonan	Submission (armbar)	PRIDE Bushido 12	August 26, 2006	1	2:30	Nagoya, Japan	PRIDE 2006 Welterweight Grand Prix Quarterfinal.
Win	12–0	Gregory Bouchelaghem	Decision (unanimous)	PRIDE Bushido 11	June 4, 2006	2	5:00	Saitama, Japan	PRIDE 2006 Welterweight Grand Prix First Round.
Win	11–0	Murilo Rua	Decision (unanimous)	PRIDE Bushido 10	April 2, 2006	2	5:00	Tokyo, Japan	
Win	10–0	Ryuta Sakurai	Submission (armbar)	PRIDE Bushido 9	September 25, 2005	1	3:49	Tokyo, Japan	
Win	9–0	Amar Suloev	Submission (armbar)	PRIDE Bushido 6	April 3, 2005	1	4:22	Yokohama, Japan	Light Heavyweight bout.
Win	8–0	Akira Shoji	Decision (split)	PRIDE Bushido 4	July 19, 2004	2	5:00	Nagoya, Japan	
Win	7–0	Daijiro Matsui	Decision (unanimous)	Gladiator FC: Day 2	June 27, 2004	3	5:00	Seoul, South Korea	
Win	6–0	Silmar Rodrigo	Decision (unanimous)	Bitetti Combat Nordeste 3	April 1, 2004	3	5:00	Rio Grande do Norte, Brazil	
Win	5–0	Akira Shoji	Submission (armbar)	PRIDE 22	September 29, 2002	1	2:48	Nagoya, Japan	
Win	4–0	Yuki Kondo	Decision (unanimous)	DEEP: 2nd Impact	August 18, 2001	3	5:00	Yokohama, Japan	
Win	3–0	Ikuhisa Minowa	Decision (unanimous)	Pancrase: Proof 2	March 31, 2001	3	5:00	Osaka, Japan	
Win	2–0	Keiichiro Yamamiya	KO (punches)	DEEP: 1st Impact	January 8, 2001	2	0:29	Nagoya, Japan	
Win	1–0	Luiz Claudio das Dores	TKO (submission to punches)	Heroes: Heroes 1	July 24, 2000	2	N/A	Rio de Janeiro, Brazil	

== Submission grappling record ==
Result	Opponent	Method	Event	Date	Round	Time	Notes
Win	(Brazil) Flavio Almeida	(Points)	ADCC Brazilian Trials	2000			-98.9 kg Final
Win	(Brazil) Leo Nagao	(Points)	ADCC Brazilian Trials	2000			-98.9 kg
Win	(Brazil) Fernando Margarida	(Points)	ADCC Brazilian Trials	2000			-98.9 kg

Vacant Title last held by Joe Riggs	3rd WEC Middleweight Champion; August 5, 2007 – December 3, 2008	Vacant WEC Middleweight division was dissolved into the
