= Mário Sperry =

Brazilian mixed martial artist

- Born: José Mário Sperry; 28 September 1966 (age 60); Porto Alegre, Brazil
- Other names: The Zen Machine
- Height: 1.85 m (6 ft 1 in)
- Weight: 100 kg (220 lb; 15 st 10 lb)
- Division: Heavyweight
- Style: MMA; Brazilian jiu-jitsu
- Fighting out of: Miami, Florida
- Team: MARIO SPERRY JIU JITSU; Imperial Athletics
- Teachers: Carlson Gracie; Georges Mehdi
- Rank: 6th degree Brazilian jiu-jitsu black belt; black belt in Judo
- Years active: 1995–2007

Mixed martial arts record
- Total: 17
- Wins: 13
- By knockout: 7
- By submission: 3
- By decision: 3
- Losses: 4
- By knockout: 3
- By decision: 1

Other information
- Mixed martial arts record from Sherdog

Mário Sperry
Medal record

Men's Grappling

Representing Brazil

ADCC World Championship
Gold medal – first place	1998 Abu Dhabi	-99kg
Gold medal – first place	1998 Abu Dhabi	Absolute

Brazilian jiu-jitsu

World Jiu-Jitsu Championship
Gold medal – first place	1998 Rio de Janeiro	Absolute
Gold medal – first place	1997 Rio de Janeiro	-100kg
Gold medal – first place	1996 Rio de Janeiro	+100kg

José Mário Sperry (born 28 September 1966) is a Brazilian heavyweight mixed martial artist. His specialty is Brazilian jiu-jitsu, grappling and ground fighting. He is also one of the founders of the Brazilian Top Team, where he trained fighters such as Antônio Rodrigo Nogueira, Antônio Rogério Nogueira, Ricardo Arona, and Paulo Filho, among others.

== Career ==
Born into a wealthy family, he attended military college where he practised sports like Waterpolo, Volleyball, and Soccer, Sperry started his martial arts career learning Kodokan Judo under master Georges Mehdi. At brown belt level, he expanded his training to Brazilian Jiu-Jitsu with Carlson Gracie, becoming one of his main apprentices. Mario earned his black belt in this art at the 1995 World BJJ Championships, where he entered to win the heavyweight black belt division, and it was popularly said that until that point he had not lost a single point in his earlier competition career. He gained the nickname "Zé Maquina" ("José Machine") for his relentless performance, which later changed to "Zen Machine" in his introduction to United States.

Having had his mixed martial arts debut in 1995, Sperry debuted in United States as part of the Extreme Fighting event, where he was billed as having a 272-0 fight record. The first round of the tournament saw him face Ecuadorian fighter and Rudyard Moncayo, whom Sperry defeated by ground and pound, but the second one would see a different outcome in Igor Zinoviev vs Mario Sperry.

Although Sperry was able to take him down and assume dominant position in several occasions, Zinoviev kept escaping to his feet every time. After ten minutes, Sperry tried to leap into a rear naked choke while Zinoviev was giving his back and holding the fence, but he slipped and fell in front of the Russian, receiving a kick to the face. Sperry took Zinoviev down anyway, but the kick had opened a deep cut, so the match was due a referee stoppage, giving the win to Igor.

=== ADCC ===
At the first edition of the ADCC Submission Wrestling World Championships in 1998, Sperry won the -99 kg division by beating Ricardo Almeida, and the absolute division by beating Ricardo Morais. The following year Sperry beat Enson Inoue to become the first Superfight Champion, and successfully defended against Roberto Traven at the 2000 edition, before being beaten by Mark Kerr over a negative point, at the championship in 2001, after a 30’ fight. In January 2022, Sperry was announced as a member of the inaugural class of the ADCC Hall of Fame.

=== PRIDE ===
In 2001, Sperry debuted in Pride Fighting Championships, where the Brazilian Top Team was competing. His first match would be an important victory against Igor Vovchanchyn, who was taken down and submitted by arm triangle choke by Sperry. He then went to fought Murilo Rua from Chute Boxe, a team that would get in a rivalry with BTT after this match. Beginning the fight, Rua landed multiple hits in Sperry both standing and on the ground, but Sperry countered with a triangle armbar attempt and tried to get position; however, Rua escaped and landed more strikes, including a soccer kick to the face. At the second round, Sperry came near of the finish with a rolling kneebar and a Kimura lock, but Murilo was able to avoid them and threw several knees to the head. Finally, Rua punished Sperry for most of the third round for a unanimous decision.

Mario rebounded back from his loss by defeating Russian Top Team's counterpart Andrei Kopylov, a former world sambo champion. As Kopylov played defensive on the mat, Sperry threw kicks and strikes, cutting him in the mouth for a doctor stoppage while Kopylov was trying a kneebar. Later, in PRIDE Shockwave 2003, Mario faced Pancrase's rising star Yuki Kondo in a back and forth match. They exchanged leglocks on the mat, and later Sperry scored a spectacular takedown, but damage to his eye caused by earlier punches forced the referee to stop the bout.

In 2004, Sperry returned to PRIDE as part of the PRIDE Bushido series, where he knocked out Mike Bencic with a single punch, in just 11 seconds. The next year, he fought Judoka Hirotaka Yokoi in a one-sided affair, with Sperry punishing a turtled up Yokoi with knees and soccer kicks for the win. Mario's last fight in the promotion would be against Yokoi's trainer, the renowned Tsuyoshi "TK" Kohsaka, in 2006. The bout was short, with the two fighters trading punches before Kohsaka landed a right hand for the KO.

=== Return to BJJ competition ===
In 2017, Sperry returned to Brazilian Jiu-Jitsu competition representing Mario Sperry Jiu Jitsu and becoming IBJJF World Master Champion in the Super-Heavy division in 2017 and Ultra-Heavy in 2018. In the final's of the IBJJF World Masters 2017 Open Class division he was defeated in a David vs Goliath match by the prominent masters competitor Wellington Leal Dias, a 17x IBJJF World Master Champion in his own right and father of Mackenzie Dern.

== Personal life ==
Mario has a daughter who was born in March 2005. Sperry is also an avid competitive surfer. Aside from his fighting career, he has a degree in economics.

== Championships and accomplishments ==
=== Grappling ===
- ADCC World Submission Wrestling Championships
  - 2022: Hall of Fame (inaugural class)
  - 2000: Superfight championship: defeated Roberto Traven
  - 1999: Superfight championship: defeated Enson Inoue
  - 1998: -99 kg: 1st place, Absolute: 1st place
- CBJJ World Championships
  - 1999: Black Belt Absolute: =3rd place, Black Belt Super Pesado = 2nd place
  - 1998: Black Belt Absolute: =1st place
  - 1997: Black Belt Super-Pesado: 1st place, Black Belt Absolute: =3rd place
  - 1996: Black Belt Pesadissimo: 1st place
  - Voted Best Brown Belt in Brazil in 1992.
  - Voted Best Purple Belt in Brazil in 1990.
- IBJJF World Championships
  - 2017: Black Best Master 5 Super Heavy Weight: 1st place
  - 2017: Black Belt Master 5 Absolute: 2nd place
- Other
  - Black Belt World Mundial Champion 1996, 1997, and 1998.
  - Brazilian National Black Belt Heavyweight Champion 1994 and 1995.

=== Mixed Martial Arts ===
- Coliseum 2000
  - Coliseum 2000 Heavyweight Championship (One time)
- Extreme Fighting
  - Extreme Fighting Middleweight Tournament Runner Up
- Martial Arts Reality Super Fight
  - Martial Arts Reality Super Fight Championship (One time)
- Ultimate Caged Combat
  - 1997 Ultimate Caged Combat Overall Championship Tournament Winner
- Other
  - 1995 Vale Tudo Super Fight Champion at the Titanic Duel in Brazil

== Mixed martial arts record ==
Professional record breakdown
17 matches	13 wins	4 losses
By knockout	7	3
By submission	3	0
By decision	3	1

Res.	Record	Opponent	Method	Event	Date	Round	Time	Location	Notes
Win	13–4	Lee Hasdell	Submission (rear-naked choke)	Cage Rage 22	July 14, 2007	1	1:39	London, England	
Loss	12–4	Tsuyoshi Kohsaka	TKO (punches)	PRIDE 31: Dreamers	February 26, 2006	1	1:20	Saitama, Japan	
Win	12–3	Hirotaka Yokoi	TKO (knees)	PRIDE 29	February 20, 2005	1	9:08	Saitama, Japan	
Win	11–3	Mike Bencic	KO (punch)	PRIDE Bushido 2	February 15, 2004	1	0:11	Yokohama, Japan	
Loss	10–3	Yuki Kondo	TKO (doctor stoppage)	PRIDE Shockwave 2003	December 31, 2003	1	3:27	Saitama, Japan	
Win	10–2	Andrei Kopylov	TKO (cut)	PRIDE 22	September 29, 2002	1	6:02	Japan	
Win	9–2	Wataru Sakata	Decision (unanimous)	UFO: Legend	August 8, 2002	3	5:00	Tokyo, Japan	
Loss	8–2	Murilo Rua	Decision (unanimous)	PRIDE 20	April 28, 2002	3	5:00	Yokohama, Japan	
Win	8–1	Igor Vovchanchyn	Submission (arm-triangle choke)	PRIDE 17	November 3, 2001	1	2:52	Tokyo, Japan	
Win	7–1	Hiromitsu Kanehara	Decision (majority)	C2K Colosseum 2000	May 26, 2000	3	5:00	Japan	Won Coliseum 2000 Heavyweight Championship
Win	6–1	Chris Haseman	TKO (submission to punches)	Caged Combat 1: Australian Ultimate Fighting	March 22, 1997	1	1:12	Sydney, Australia	Won Caged Combat 1 Tournament
Win	5–1	Neil Bodycote	TKO (submission to punches)	Caged Combat 1: Australian Ultimate Fighting	March 22, 1997	1	0:47	Sydney, Australia	Caged Combat 1 Semifinals
Win	4–1	Vernon White	Decision (unanimous)	Caged Combat 1: Australian Ultimate Fighting	March 13, 1997	3	5:00	Sydney, Australia	Caged Combat 1 First Round
Win	3–1	Andrey Dudko	Submission (kimura)	MARS: Martial Arts Reality Superfighting	November 22, 1996	1	4:15	Alabama, United States	Won MARS Superfight Championship
Loss	2–1	Igor Zinoviev	TKO (doctor stoppage)	Extreme Fighting 1	November 18, 1995	1	11:39	North Carolina, United States	EDC Middleweight Tournament finals
Win	2–0	Rudyard Moncayo	TKO (submission to punches)	Extreme Fighting 1	November 18, 1995	1	2:42	North Carolina, United States	EFC Middleweight Tournament Semifinal
Win	1–0	Jose Balduino	TKO (submission to strikes)	Duelo de Titas 1	September 1, 1995	N/A	N/A	Brazil	

== Submission grappling record ==
Result	Opponent	Method	Event	Date	Round	Time	Notes
Loss	(Brazil) Ricardo Liborio	Decision	ADCC 2015 Superfight	2015			
Win	(Brazil) Fabio Gurgel	Decision	ADCC 2013 Absolute	2013			
Win	(Brazil) Renzo Gracie	Points	ADCC 2011 Absolute	2011			
Loss	(Brazil) Roger Gracie	Points	ADCC 2003 –99 kg	2003			
Loss	(United States) Mark Kerr	Penalty	ADCC 1999 Absolute	2001			
Win	(Japan) Enson Inoue	Points	ADCC 1999 Absolute	1999			
Loss	(Brazil) Rodrigo Comprido	Advantage	World Championship	1999			
Loss	(Brazil) Leonardo Leite	Points	World Championship	1999			
Win	(Brazil) Roberto Roleta	Advantage	World Championship	1998			
Win	(Brazil) Royler Gracie	Submission (clock choke)	World Championship	1998			
Loss	(Brazil) Roberto Roleta	Points	World Championship	1998			
Win	(Brazil) Simon Siasi	Submission (kneebar)	ADCC 1998 Absolute	1998			
Win	(Russia) Oleg Taktarov	Points	ADCC 1998 Absolute	1998			
Win	(Brazil) Ricardo Alves	Submission (choke)	ADCC 1998 –99 kg	1998			
Win	(Brazil) Renato Verissimo	Submission (choke)	ADCC 1998 –99 kg	1998			
Win	(United States) Larry Parker	Submission (armbar)	ADCC 1998 –99 kg	1998			
Win	(Brazil) Muhammad Saleh	Points	ADCC 1998 –99 kg	1998			
Win	(Brazil) Roberto Correa	Submission (wrist lock)	World Championship	1997			
Win	(Brazil) Saulo Ribeiro	Points	World Championship	1997			
Win	(Brazil) Francisco Bueno	Submission (wrist lock)	Atlantico Sul	1994			

== Notable students ==
- Carlão Santos
- Marcello Salazar
- Michael Chiovitti
