= Júlio 'Foca' Fernandez =

Brazilian jiu-jitsu practitioner from Brazil

Julio "Foca" Fernandez
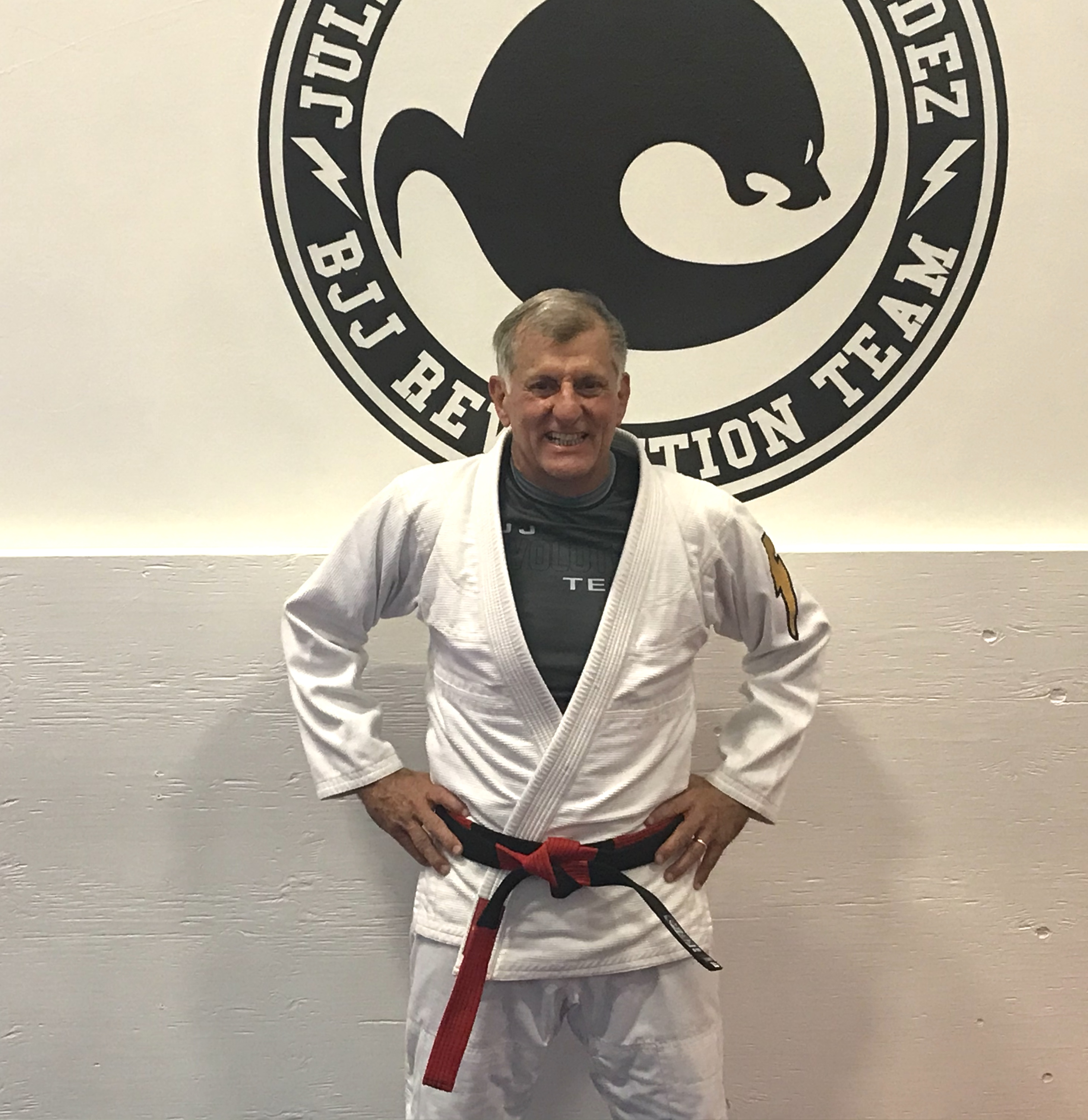
- Born: Julio César Fernandez Nunes; 3 March 1957 (age 69); Rio de Janeiro, RJ, Brazil
- Nationality: Brazilian
- Division: Featherweight
- Style: Brazilian Jiu-Jitsu
- Fighting out of: Williston, Vermont
- Team: BJJ Revolution Team; Carlson Gracie Competition Team
- Teacher: Carlson Gracie Sr.
- Rank: 7th deg. BJJ Red and Black Coral belt

Other information
- Website: vermontbjj bjjrevolutionteam

Júlio "Foca" Fernandez (born March 3, 1957) is a 8th degree Red and White Coral Belt in Brazilian jiu-jitsu (BJJ) under the late Grandmaster Carlson Gracie Sr. One of the first Brazilians to move to the US in the late 80s and introduce BJJ there, Fernandez is a co-founder of BJJ Revolution Team.

== Biography ==
Julio César Fernandez Nunes was born on 3 March 1957 in Rio de Janeiro. His nickname, Foca, is Portuguese for "Sea Lion" and was given to him because as a sponsor surfer in his youth, Fernandez spent a lot of time in the ocean. In 1975 he started practicing Brazilian jiu-jitsu (BJJ) under Master Carlson Gracie, earning all his belts from him. At 17, he started to compete in all the local BJJ tournaments of Rio de Janeiro. On 13 August 1988 he was promoted to black belt. During his ten years competing under Carlson Gracie Competition Team, Fernandez remained undefeated in over two hundred matches. In 1989 he moved to the US settling in Vermont and open a BJJ academy. In 2000 he started BJJ Revolution Team with his longtime training partner and teammate Rodrigo Medeiros. In 2004, he co-authored Brazilian Jiu-jitsu: For Experts Only with Carlson Gracie.

== Instructor Lineage ==
Mitsuyo "Count Koma" Maeda → Carlos Gracie → Carlson Gracie Sr. → Julio "Foca" Fernandez

== Championships ==
Main Achievements:

- 5 x Brazilian National Champion
- 3 x Rio de Janeiro State Champion
- 2 x IBJJF World Masters Champion
