= Marcus Soares =

Brazilian Jiu-Jitsu instructor

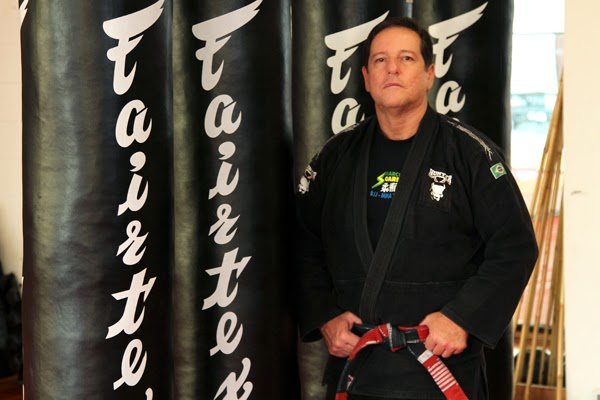
- Born: 1956
- Nationality: Brazilian
- Style: Brazilian jiu-jitsu
- Team: Carlson Gracie Team
- Rank: 9th deg. BJJ red belt

Other information
- Notable students: Denis Kang, Marcus Silveira, Ricardo de La Riva, Stephan Kesting
- Website: marcussoares.com

Marcus Soares (born 1956) is a Brazilian born, Canadian Brazilian Jiu-Jitsu instructor and member of the Carlson Gracie Jiu-Jitsu Team. He has achieved the rank of 9th degree (9º grau) black belt, the highest level in the sport, and is the only grand master in Canada.

== Career ==
Marcus Soares has had the opportunity to teach and spar with some of the best Brazilian fighters of his time. He is known for his technical expertise and ability to develop student's physical conditioning, both of which are essential attributes for successful fighters. Soares is also highly respected in the Brazilian Jiu-Jitsu community, with notable students and colleagues citing him as a major influence in their training.

Soares began his Brazilian Jiu-Jitsu training in 1970 and opened his own school in 1979 in Rio de Janeiro, Brazil. In 1980, he began a university course in Physical education and also opened a fitness school. In 1983, he completed a Diploma in Physical Education.

In 1996, Soares was invited to teach in Canada, and was the first black belt to teach Brazilian Jiu-jitsu in Canada. He has since become a respected instructor and leader in the Brazilian Jiu-Jitsu community in Canada. Soares directly runs three gyms in Vancouver, Maple Ridge., and Langley. In addition, he has 11 affiliate schools throughout Canada, Mexico, the Netherlands and South Africa.

== Instructor lineage ==
Kano Jigoro → Tomita Tsunejiro → Mitsuyo "Count Koma" Maeda → Carlos Gracie Sr. → Carlson Gracie → Marcus Soares.

== See also ==
- Carlson Gracie
- Denis Kang
- List of Brazilian jiu-jitsu practitioners
