= André Pederneiras =

Brazilian martial arts coach and promoter

- Born: Carlos André Pederneiras de Castro; 22 March 1967 (age 59); Rio de Janeiro, Brazil
- Other names: Dedé
- Height: 5 ft 8 in (1.73 m)
- Weight: 155 lb (70 kg; 11.1 st)
- Division: Lightweight
- Team: Nova União; Academia Upper
- Rank: 7th deg. Brazilian Jiu-Jitsu red and black Coral belt (under Carlson Gracie); Judo black belt
- Years active: 1998–2000 (MMA)

Mixed martial arts record
- Total: 4
- Wins: 1
- By knockout: 1
- Losses: 1
- By knockout: 1
- Draws: 2

Other information
- Mixed martial arts record from Sherdog

Carlos André Pederneiras de Castro (born 22 March 1967) is a Brazilian jiu-jitsu (BJJ) and mixed martial arts (MMA) coach and promoter. A former BJJ competitor, holding today a Red and Black 7th Degree Coral belt, Pederneiras is a six-time Brazilian National jiu-jitsu champion. During his short career as an MMA fighter, he challenged Pat Miletich for the UFC Welterweight Championship in 1999, and fought at the Shooto-run Vale Tudo Japan events.

Pederneiras is the co-founder of Nova União, one of the top BJJ/MMA academy and team, acting as its leader and MMA head coach until stepping down in 2018 after 21 years. He is widely regarded as one of the best BJJ and MMA coaches in the world.

Among the numerous champions he produced, Pederneiras is best known for training José Aldo, B.J. Penn and Renan Barão who all became UFC champions. Pederneiras is also the President of Shooto Brasil, the Brazilian branch of Japanese MMA promotion Shooto.

== Background ==
Carlos André Pederneiras de Castro was born on 22 March 1967, in Rio de Janeiro, Brazil. When he was 17 years old he joined a gym, originally to train with weight for fitness. However the gym offered Brazilian jiu-jitsu (BJJ) classes as well so he decided to try it out. He trained with Rodrigo Vieira, a student of Rickson Gracie until he received his Brown Belt. After Vieira left to join another gym, Carlson Gracie became Pederneiras' coach and also offered him a position of instructors of the juniors at the gym. In 1989, Pederneiras received his Black Belt from Gracie when he was 22 years old. In 2018, Pederneiras became owner of the gym he originally trained and renamed it to Academia Upper.

During Pederneiras' BJJ career under the Carlson Gracie team, he was a six-time Brazilian National Champion. In 2019, the International Brazilian Jiu-Jitsu Federation (IBJJF) promoted Pederneiras to 7th degree Coral (Red and Black) Belt.

Pederneiras' nickname is Dedé which is a friendly way of saying André, in Portuguese.

== Mixed martial arts career ==
Pederneiras had a brief career in MMA that lasted from 1998 to 2000.

In 1998, Pederneiras had his debut fight at Vale Tudo Japan where defeated Rumina Sato in the first round via knockout.

In 1999, Pederneiras challenged Pat Miletich for UFC Welterweight Title at UFC 21 where he lost in the second round via technical knockout.

In the same year, Pederneiras fought Caol Uno at Vale Tudo Japan where the match ended in a draw.

In 2000, Pederneiras fought Genki Sudo at C2K: Colosseum 2000 where the match ended in a draw again. This was Pederneiras' last fight in his MMA career and he retired from MMA to become a full time coach.

== Coaching career ==
After obtaining his Black Belt, Pederneiras established his own BJJ team called Dedé Pederneiras Jiu Jitsu. Although is reached success quite fast, it was unable to compete with much larger team like Gracie Barra and the Carlson Gracie Team that won most of the tournaments due to the number of athletes they could field. Pederneiras met Wendell Alexander at a BJJ tournament. Alexander was also had his own BJJ team called Mello Tenis Clube and like Pederneiras, had trouble competing with much larger teams.

In 1995, the two of them eventually joined forces to create the gym, Nova União which translates to New Union. Nova União would become one of the leading teams in BJJ where it would win many medals in tournaments such as the World Jiu-Jitsu Championships.

In the late 1990s, Pederneiras became one of the first Brazilians to open the doors of his gym to foreigners with the most famous initial ones being B.J. Penn and John Lewis. This attracted controversy and his old master, Carlson called him a Creonte (meaning traitor) although anti foreign sentiment eventually faded away as time passed. Penn earned his Black Belt under Pederneiras in 2000 in just three years and then a few months later he became champion at the Black Belt level in the featherweight division of the World Jiu-Jitsu Championships. He was the first American to achieve this feat.

In 2002, Pederneiras decided to pull Nova União out of all tournaments organized by the IBJJF. This was due to opposition of IBJJF's policy of not paying their competitors. Pederneiras created the Olympic Brazilian Jiu Jitsu Federation (CBJJO) which would create its own tournaments such as the Copa Del Mundo. Eventually after several years of disputes, Pederneiras allowed Nova União to return to IBJJF tournaments and CBJJO was dissolved. CBJJO would be re-instituted later under new management and IBJJF tournaments are now offering cash rewards.

Later on, Pederneiras decided make Nova União branch out more into MMA because he saw it as a viable way for many of its gym members who had poor backgrounds to earn a living. Pederneiras himself was previously an MMA fighter from 1998 to 2000. Pederneiras through his connections became President of Shooto Brasil, the Brazilian branch of Shooto, a Japanese MMA promotion. Pederneiras has organized many MMA events in Brazil as a way of providing its gym members as well as many other fighters a way of earning a living. Since then Pederneiras had focused mostly on the MMA part of the team and has left the BJJ part to Alexander and other trainers.

In 2017, Pederneiras attracted some attention when he urged Brazilian fighters to move to the United States as it offered better opportunities for training and development.

In 2018, Pederneiras stepped down from his duties as leader and head trainer of Nova União to focus on building another gym called Academia Upper. This was the gym he originally trained at.

Pederneiras has spent a lot of time helping the local community, many of whom at underprivileged. Pederneiras has allowed the underprivileged to train and live at Nova União at no cost provided they help out at the gym. The most notable example of these students is José Aldo. Aldo grew up poor with little money but was allowed to train and live at Nova União provided he helped out at the gym. Eventually Aldo became the UFC Featherweight Champion with the highest number of title defenses at seven and is considered by Sherdog to be the greatest MMA featherweight fighter in history. As of 2021, Pederneiras still remains as Aldo's coach.

== Instructor lineage ==
Kano Jigoro → Tomita Tsunejiro → Mitsuyo Maeda → Carlos Gracie → Carlson Gracie → André Pederneiras

== Notable students ==
=== Fighters ===
- José Aldo – Former two-time UFC Featherweight Champion, Former List of World Extreme Cagefighting champions#Featherweight Championship
- B.J. Penn – Former UFC Lightweight Champion, Former UFC Welterweight Champion, IBJJF World Champion (Black Belt)
- Renan Barão – Former UFC Bantamweight Champion
- Junior dos Santos – Former UFC Heavyweight Champion
- Cláudia Gadelha – Former UFC Women's Strawweight title challenger
- Leonardo Santos – TUF Brazil 2 winner, 4x CBJJO World Jiu-Jitsu Cup Champion, ADCC Bronze Medalist
- Eduardo Dantas – Former two-time Bellator Bantamweight Champion
- Marcos Galvão – Former Bellator Bantamweight Champion

=== Grapplers ===
- Robson Moura – 5x IBJJF World Champion (Black Belt)
- Vítor Ribeiro – 3x IBJJF World Champion (Black Belt), ADCC Bronze Medalist
- João Roque – IBJJF World Champion (Black Belt)

== Awards and achievements ==
- 7th degree Coral (Red and Black) Belt in Brazilian jiu-jitsu
- PVT Magazine (Portal do Vale Tudo) – MMA Coach of the Year 2010
- 6x Brazilian National Champion in Brazilian jiu-jitsu
- Vale Tudo Japan Champion (1998)

== Mixed martial arts record ==
Professional record breakdown
4 matches	1 win	1 loss
By knockout	1	1
Draws	2	

Res.	Record	Opponent	Method	Event	Date	Round	Time	Location	Notes
Draw	1–1–2	Genki Sudo	Draw	C2K – Colosseum 2000	26 May 2000	1	15:00	Japan	
Draw	1–1–1	Caol Uno	Draw	VTJ 1999 – Vale Tudo Japan 1999	11 December 1999	3	8:00	Tokyo, Japan	
Loss	1–1	Pat Miletich	TKO (doctor stoppage)	UFC 21	16 July 1999	2	2:20	Cedar Rapids, Iowa, United States	For the UFC Welterweight Championship.
Win	1–0	Rumina Sato	KO (soccer kick and punches)	VTJ 1998 – Vale Tudo Japan 1998	25 October 1998	1	4:09	Tokyo, Japan	
