= Marcelo Saporito =

Brazilian ju-jitsu trainer

- Born: July 21, 1959 (age 66) (Rio de Janeiro (state)) Rio de Janeiro, Brazil
- Style: Brazilian Jiu-Jitsu, Judo
- Teacher: Carlson Gracie, Sr.
- Rank: 6th degree black belt in Brazilian Jiu-Jitsu; Brown belt in Judo

Other information
- Website: http://www.marcelosaporito.com.br/

Marcelo Saporito is the head coach of Brazilian Jiu-Jitsu academy, the “Academia Carlson Gracie” in Figueiredo Magalhaes St., Copacabana. He took the mammoth task of replacing the late Master Carlson Gracie at the helm of the gym, which he has done to perfection with over 200 team titles to this date.

== Biography ==
Marcelo Saporito was born on the 21st of July, 1959 in Rio de Janeiro, Brazil. He began martial arts at 11 years of age with boxing and Tae Kwon Do. He trained the Korean martial art very seriously, having won two Rio de Janeiro state championships in a row (in 1978 and 1979).

In 1981 Saporito joined the AABB Judo club and trained the Japanese martial art under Professor Jomar (with whom he holds a Judo brown belt). In time Saporito gained interest in grappling and the efficiency of Brazilian Jiu-Jistu.

In 1982 he joined the Carlson Gracie academy in Copacabana, Rio de Janeiro.

All of Marcelo Saporito’s Brazilian Jiu-Jitsu training is under the unequalled Carlson Gracie. He achieved all his belts from the Gracie Master including his black on 20 September 1995.

He started giving classes at his master’s academy after the personal request of Alberto Santos. After Carlson assessed Saporito’s skill as an instructor, he was quite impressed and decided to have Marcelo on board as a full-time assistant coach. With time his influence in the team was evident and he was asked to take over as the head coach.

== Lineage ==
Mitsuyo Maeda > Carlos Gracie > Carlson Gracie > Marcelo Saporito

== Main Competitive Achievements ==
2x Brazilian National Champion (1994 brown, 1995 black – CBJJ)
Brazilian National Silver Medallist (1993 purple)

== Seminars ==
For the past three years Mestre Saporito has taught seminars at several locations, including Fabio Novaes Brazilian Jiu-jitsu, in Lakeland, Florida, and The Armory, in Jupiter, Florida, as well as seminars in Wintersville, Ohio.

== Sources ==
- Marcelo Saporito
- Fabio Novaes
- BJJ Heroes
