= Creonte =

Brazilian ji-jitsu pejorative term

Creonte is a Brazilian Portuguese pejorative term roughly meaning "traitor" that is used within Brazilian jiu-jitsu organizations to refer to a former student who is perceived to be disloyal due to starting an independent school, switching associations, or otherwise moving on from a longstanding relationship with an academy or instructor. In the pre-Internet era, former students were perceived to have knowledge of "secret" techniques known only within their prior school which could be taught and used against former teammates at Brazilian jiu-jitsu competitions such as IBJJF and ADCC tournaments.

== Origins ==
The coining of the term is credited to the late grandmaster Carlson Gracie (1932 – 2006), who is said to have adapted the term from a character in a popular Brazilian TV soap opera Mandala. The character had many competing allegiances and changed his mind and loyalties frequently.

== Decline ==
With the proliferation of modern Brazilian jiu-jitsu organizations and academies outside of Brazil and the vast amount of BJJ knowledge available online, the notion of a creonte has become less relevant. While some still adhere to the traditional meaning emphasizing the importance of fidelity to one's chosen instructor and academy, others argue the notion is no longer applicable in the modern multinational era. Thousands of instances of BJJ students moving to a new geographic area and no longer having access to their original training organization, an increasing number of casual or hobbyist students who do not identify as strongly with any one particular school or organization, and the fact that in the internet age there are no longer "secret" techniques and tactics known only to a particular academy or instructor all contribute to the notion of creonte is no longer relevant.

== In popular culture ==
Matt Heafy of heavy metal band Trivium references the term in the song "Betrayer," as Heafy is a practitioner of Brazilian jiu-jitsu.
