= Ricardo Libório =

Brazilian martial artist (born 1967)

- Ricardo Libório
- Born: July 13, 1967 (age 59); Rio de Janeiro, Brazil
- Nationality: Brazilian American
- Rank: 7th degree coral belt under Carlson Gracie; 2nd degree black belt in Judo under Rhadi Ferguson

Ricardo Libório
Medal record

Brazilian Jiu-Jitsu/Grappling

World Jiu-Jitsu Championship
Gold medal – first place	1996	Super Heavy 100kg (black)

Antonio Ricardo Jardim Libório (born July 13, 1967) is a Brazilian jiu jitsu black belt under Grand Master Carlson Gracie. He is the co-founder of American Top Team (ATT) and Brazilian Top Team (BTT), the founder and CEO of Martial Arts Nation and the International Brazilian Jiu-Jitsu Institute (IBJJI), and also a professor of BJJ at the University of Central Florida.

According to Fight! "Power 20" in 2012, which profiles the twenty "most significant power players, movers, shakers, ambassadors, and game-changers in MMA," Libório was ranked #13.

He was nominated as "Coach of the Year" for the Fighters Only World Mixed Martial Awards in 2009.

== Brazilian jiu-jitsu career ==
Antônio Ricardo Jardim Libório was born on July 13, 1967, in Rio de Janeiro, Brazil. His introduction to combat sports began at the age of four, when he began studying judo. He later took up a variety of traditional and modern martial arts, including taekwondo, Muay Thai and boxing. At 14, he began training in Brazilian jiu-jitsu at the Carlson Gracie academy in Copacabana, Rio de Janeiro, which produced black belts such as Vitor Belfort, André Pederneiras, Walid Ismail, Mario Sperry and Ricardo de la Riva. Libório received his black belt from Carlson Gracie in 1993 at the age of 26.

In 1996, Libório entered the first ever "Mundials," or World Jiu-Jitsu Championship, winning a gold medal in the super heavyweight (super-pesado) division over Leo Castello Branco, a much heavier opponent. He was awarded the title of "Most Technical Black Belt" in that tournament. The next year, Libório competed in the International Masters Mundials under his middle name, Antônio Jardim, taking gold in the meio-pesado (middle-heavy) division. He gained renown as a jiu-jitsu player, leading Carlson to claim he could beat the legendary Rickson Gracie in a sport jiu-jitsu bout.

== Mixed martial arts career ==
Ricardo co-founded Brazilian Top Team in collaboration with three other Carlson Gracie students, Murilo Bustamante, Luis Duarte, and Mario Sperry.

In 2001 Ricardo was approached by American businessman and Brazilian Jiu Jitsu practitioner, Dan Lambert. Dan recruited Ricardo, and together they formed a partnership, which would eventually become American Top Team.

Libório had his own MMA debut against Pancrase wrestler Ikuhisa Minowa for Japanese promotion Deep the same year. In a bout with almost no strike thrown between the contendants, Libório opened the first round struggling to take Minowa down, but he gained half mount for a while and threatened him with an armbar, which Minowa returned with a standing kimura attempt. Ricardo dominated an uneventful second round, resuming his domain the top position and almost locking a rear naked choke at its end, and he would go on to trade submissions with the Japanese wrestler at the third and last round, being still entangled in a leglock exchange when the bell rang. As the match was stipulated to be without judges, it went to a draw.

=== Mixed martial arts record ===
Professional record breakdown
1 match	0 wins	0 losses
Draws	1	

Res.	Record	Opponent	Method	Event	Date	Round	Time	Location	Notes
Draw	0–0-1	Ikuhisa Minowa	Draw	Deep - 1st Impact	January 8, 2001	3	5:00	Nagoya, Japan	

== ADCC Superfight ==
On August 29, 2015, Libório fought former Carlson Gracie teammate, Mario Sperry, in the ADCC Submission Wrestling World Championship "Superfight." After 20 minutes and two overtime periods, the referees awarded the decision to Libório.

== After ATT ==
=== Martial Arts Nation ===
After Leaving ATT in 2015, Libório founded Martial Arts Nation in 2018. The martial arts firm specializes in consulting, events, licensing, and branding for BJJ and other martial arts. The company's primary focus is to create sustainable programs that teach character education, leadership, and well-being with their martial arts curriculum. Additionally, the founder of MA Nation is very focused on fostering an inclusive and welcoming culture inside every MA Nation training facility.

=== University of Central Florida (UCF) ===
Libório has made an impact at the University of Central Florida (UCF) through his BJJ club structure, classes, and events. Master Libório, in August 2018, came to UCF and helped restructure the UCF MMA club and transformed it into a BJJ club through a new organizational system and welcoming culture. At the end of 2018, the club had 30 members. By 2020, the club had 250 members, was the largest sports club at UCF, and had the second-highest female participation rate out of all other sports clubs.

On August 26, 2019, he created the first BJJ college class to be offered by a university in the U.S. from a world champion and coach. In 2020, Libório continued by adding a level 2 intermediate class to the establish beginner class schedule. His classes and club have reached hundreds of students.

In March 2018, Librio hosted the first Florida collegiate Jiu-Jitsu in-state competition Resenha or "hangout" event. The event focused on getting people who usually are fans off the stands and participating in Brazilian Jiu-Jitsu. Furthermore, essential topics of the event included learning more about the sport's mental and physical benefits, including helping with self-defense, anxiety, depression, focus, and self-confidence through a "Mat and Chat" system developed by Libório. In total, over 350 people participated, and 85 Black Belts from across the U.S. came to the event.

=== Orange County Public Schools (OCPS) ===
In 2018 Libório founded an after school Martial Arts program with aims for its implementation throughout the U.S. He partnered with OCPS to create the first afterschool martial arts program in Orange county Florida at Edgewater Highschool, through Martial Arts Nation, with an emphasis on BJJ. Márcio Pimentel was the lead coach of the program, and Professor Kyle Leisher is currently the head administrator of the club at Edgewater.

BJJ is the primary sport of this project; however, other martial arts are now being taught as well, such as Judo, grappling, and self-defense. Like many other programs Libório has founded, the focus of this project centers around building self-confidence, character education, raising self-esteem, and particularly for high school students, anti-bullying education. Teaching how BJJ can positively impact a person in his or her everyday life, not just in competition, is also a central element of the OCPS program. The Edgewater program has seen year after year growth since its inception due to its organizational structure, welcoming culture, and MA nation sponsorship.

=== Work with the visually impaired ===
After craniosynostosis rendered Libório's daughter visually impaired at 1 1/2 years old, he developed a community outreach program through American Top Team. The academy is certified to teach judo to visually impaired students.

== Championships and accomplishments ==
- Three time Brazilian National Champion
- IBJJF World Champion 1996
- 3rd Abu Dhabi Submission Tournament 1999
- 2nd Abu Dhabi Submission Tournament 2000
- World Champion Masters Division 2000
- NAGA Coach of the year in 2005
- National Coach for USA Grappling
- Inducted into the NAGA Grappling Hall of Fame 2005
- Voted most technical brazilian jiu-Jitsu competitor in 2006 Mundial
- Worked with the Wounded Warrior Project and U.S. Navy Seals
- USA Grappling Honors Award recipient 2009
- Inducted into the official World Grappling Hall of Fame 2010
- Inducted into the Broward County Sports Hall of Fame 2010
- ADCC 2015 Superfight Champion masters def Mario Sperry
- 2016 Rio de Janeiro international Olympic supervisor for judo and wrestling
- Palm Sports Abu Dhabi Honors award recipient 2018
- Martial Arts Industry Association Honors award recipient 2019
