= American Top Team =

Mixed martial arts team

- Est.: 2001; 25 years ago
- Founded by: Dan Lambert; Ricardo Libório
- Primary trainers: Mike Brown; Marcus "Conan" Silveira; Steve Mocco
- Current titleholders: Kayla Harrison (UFC Bantamweight Champion)
- Prominent fighters: Dustin Poirier (UFC); Bo Nickal (UFC); Mateusz Gamrot (UFC); Kyoji Horiguchi (UFC); Joanna Jędrzejczyk (UFC); Jorge Masvidal (UFC); Johnny Eblen (PFL); Gleison Tibau (UFC); Cole Miller; Glover Teixeira (UFC); Arman Tsarukyan (UFC); Kayla Harrison (UFC); Thiago Alves (UFC); Renato Moicano (UFC); Will Brooks (UFC); Douglas Lima (PFL); Muhammed "King Mo" Lawal (Bellator MMA); Bobby Lashley (Bellator MMA); Yoel Romero (PFL); Andrei Arlovski (UFC); Thiago Santos (UFC); Santiago Ponzinibbio (UFC); Antônio Silva (Strikeforce, UFC); Mike Thomas Brown (UFC); Tyron Woodley (UFC); Wilson Gouveia (UFC); Dakota Ditcheva (PFL); Adriano Moraes (ONE)
- Website: www.americantopteam.com

American Top Team (ATT) is one of the primary teams in mixed martial arts. The gym was founded by Dan Lambert, who brought in former members of Brazilian Top Team Marcus "Conan" Silveira, Marcelo Silveira and Ricardo Liborio, but there is no formal affiliation between the two teams. ATT's main academy is in Coconut Creek, Florida, and there are affiliated academies throughout the United States. ATT features professional fighters who have competed in many major promotions, such as the Ultimate Fighting Championship (UFC), PRIDE Fighting Championships, DREAM, K-1, Strikeforce, Bellator, Professional Fighters League (PFL) and ONE Championship.

In 2017, ATT also became involved in professional wrestling, and its fighters appeared as part of the American Top Team stable in events of Impact Wrestling, Major League Wrestling and All Elite Wrestling.

== History ==
Dan Lambert founded American Top Team in 2001. He became friends with Florida-based BJJ instructor and MMA fighter Marcus "Conan" Silveira and both were soon joined by Marcelo Silveira and Ricardo Libório, one of the co-founders of Brazilian Top Team. All three Brazilian masters were former BTT and Carlson Gracie black belts. Their vision was to build a world-class training facility where MMA fighters could get all of their training under one roof, similar to the Brazilian Top Team. Although they shared founders and similar names, the ATT would not be the American branch of the BTT, but a new camp entirely. A businessman by trade and Brazilian jiu-jitsu enthusiast, Lambert oversaw American Top Team as it became one of the top MMA training facilities and martial arts academies in the world. Headquartered in Coconut Creek, Florida, American Top Team has produced numerous MMA world champions and highly notable competitors. It is widely considered one of the top MMA facilities in the world, and it won the Best Gym category at the World MMA Awards in 2016, 2017, 2018 and 2019. There are currently over 40 American Top Team affiliates worldwide representing the ATT banner.

In 2021, Lambert and American Top Team started to appear regularly for professional wrestling promotion All Elite Wrestling, allying with Ethan Page and Scorpio Sky, with UFC fighters Andrei Arlovski, Junior Dos Santos, Jorge Masvidal, and Paige VanZant, among others, making appearances. American Top Team had previously made minor appearances in Impact Wrestling in 2017 and 2018 as part of a storyline where ATT fighter and professional wrestler Bobby Lashley quit wrestling (in kayfabe) to focus on his MMA career.

== Notable fighters ==
- Yaroslav Amosov
- Andrei Arlovski
- Junior Dos Santos
- Joanna Jędrzejczyk
- Tyron Woodley
- Omari Akhmedov
- Dakota Ditcheva
- Movsar Evloev
- Thiago Alves
- Will Brooks
- Mike Brown
- Roan Carneiro
- Kayla Harrison
- Hayder Hassan
- Kyoji Horiguchi
- Magomed Umalatov
- Jorge Masvidal
- Antonio Carlos Junior
- Bobby Lashley
- Marcus "Buchecha" Almeida
- Bo Nickal
- Muhammed Lawal
- Robbie Lawler
- Douglas Lima
- Magomed Magomedkerimov
- Cole Miller
- Steve Mocco
- Jeff Monson
- Ramazan Kuramagomedov
- Pedro Munhoz
- Amanda Nunes
- Dustin Poirier
- Santiago Ponzinibbio
- Yoel Romero
- Jairzinho Rozenstruik
- Alessio Sakara
- Thiago Santos
- Shahbulat Shamhalaev
- Antônio Silva
- Kimbo Slice
- Glover Teixeira
- Gleison Tibau
- Albert Tumenov
- Gasan Umalatov
- Jussier Formiga
- Renato Moicano
- Mateusz Gamrot
- Scott Askham
- Philipe Lins
- Adriano Moraes
- Alexandre Pantoja
- Danny Sabatello
- Paige VanZant
- Attila Végh
- Dovletdzhan Yagshimuradov
- Johnny Eblen
- Arman Tsarukyan
- Grant Dawson
- Valerie Loureda

== Notable coaches ==
- Mike Brown
- Thiago Alves
- Steve Mocco
- Muhammed Lawal

== Awards ==
- World MMA Awards
  - 2016 Gym of the Year
  - 2017 Gym of the Year
  - 2018 Gym of the Year
  - 2019 – July 2020 Gym of the Year
  - 2021 Gym of the Year
- Voting period for 2019 awards ran from January 2019 to July 2020 due to the COVID-19 pandemic. Subsequently, the voting period for 2021 awards ran from July 2020 to July 2021.
  - 2023 Gym of the Year

== See also ==
- List of professional MMA training camps
