= Brazilian Top Team =

BJJ and MMA academy and competition team

- Est.: 2000
- Founded by: Murilo Bustamante; Ricardo Libório; Mário Sperry; Luis Roberto Duarte
- Past titleholders: Antônio Rodrigo Nogueira Heavyweight Champion (Pride 2001–2002) 240 lb (110 kg; 17 st); Murilo Bustamante Middleweight Champion (UFC 2002) 185 lb (84 kg; 13.2 st); Vitor Belfort Light Heavyweight Champion (UFC 2004) 205 lb (93 kg; 14.6 st)
- Training facilities: Rio de Janeiro City; Rio de Janeiro (headquarters); Juiz de Fora, Minas Gerais; Tustin, California; Long Beach, California; Austin, Texas; Dallas, Texas; San Antonio, Texas; Humble, Texas; Norwalk, California; Fullerton, California; Happy Valley, Oregon; Everett, Massachusetts
- Website: braziliantopteam.net

Brazilian Top Team (BTT) is an academy and team specialized in Brazilian jiu-jitsu and mixed martial arts. It was established in April 2000 by Murilo Bustamante, Ricardo Libório, Mário Sperry and Luis Roberto Duarte, former members of the Carlson Gracie Academy, to develop and create new training techniques for Brazilian Jiu Jitsu, submission grappling and mixed martial arts. Its headquarters is in Rio de Janeiro, with multiple affiliate locations around the world.

== History ==
Brazilian Top Team has its origins with Carlson Gracie and his academy. Gracie was an innovator in brazilian jiu-jitsu, he and his students had invented and refined many techniques and strategies in BJJ and fought in a very aggressive and physical style, achieving success in tournaments. His academy was a mixed martial arts pioneer and many of his students went to represent BJJ in many MMA events around the world. However, there were disputes between Gracie and his students led to many branching off from his tutelage and founding their own academies. Murilo Bustamante, Ricardo Libório, Mário Sperry and Luis Roberto Duarte went to found in 2000 Brazilian Top Team, with the objective of creating a world-class Brazilian jiu-jitsu gym and to train in the nascent sport of Mixed martial arts.

In 2007 the Nogueira Brothers (Antônio Rodrigo Nogueira and Antônio Rogério Nogueira) founded their own team taking some BTT fighters with them. It split the power of the team at this time but BTT kept building young fighters. Ricardo Arona and Paulo Filho followed their own way but returned often to visit and train with the team at the BTT headquarters in Rio de Janeiro.

Ricardo Liborio left the team in 2002, moving to the US to found American Top Team (ATT) with American entrepreneur Dan Lambert and his fellow BTT and Carlson Gracie black belts Marcus "Conan" Silveira and Marcelo Silveira. While they share similar names and founders, ATT was not created as an American branch of BTT but as its own independent camp. ATT went on to be considered one of the most successful MMA camps in the world.

The team has affiliates in Brazil, Canada, United States, Austria, Estonia, Malta, Australia and Thailand.

== Rivalry with Chute Boxe ==
BTT maintains an intense rivalry with Brazilian mixed martial arts stable Chute Boxe, which is descended from a Muay Thai lineage. BTT traces its lineage to the Brazilian jiu jitsu of Carlson Gracie. The most storied chapter of this rivalry was reached at the apex of each team's success in PRIDE FC. Chute Boxe was comprised, at the time, of such fighters as Wanderlei Silva and Shogun Rua, and former UFC Middleweight Champion Anderson Silva.

BTT consisted of top fighters such as Ricardo Arona, former UFC Middleweight Champion Murilo Bustamante, the Nogueira Brothers, Vitor Belfort, Allan Goes, Mario Sperry, and former WEC Middleweight Champion Paulo Filho. Competition between the two teams was not limited to Pride FC matches. Bouts between fighters of the two camps took place in Brazil, Portugal, the U.S., and other parts of the world on a regular basis.

== Locations ==
In April 2000 BTT inaugurated a new center in Brazil for training professional fighters in mixed martial arts. It provides teachers of Muay Thai, boxing, wrestling mixed martial arts and Brazilian Jiu-Jitsu.

Other locations are:

- Montreal, Quebec, Canada – Fábio Holanda opened Brazilian Top Team Canada and has trained prominent UFC Fighters Patrick Côté, Charles Jourdain and UFC Welterweight Champion Georges St-Pierre.
- Long Beach, California – Marcelo Perdomo (BJJ Black Belt under BTT co-founder Murilo Bustamante) opened Brazilian Top Team Long Beach in mid-2004.
- Tustin, California – Total MMA Studios, Juliano Prado and Adriano Nasal.
- Boston, Massachusetts – In 2003 João C. Amaral and Daniel Gazoni opened Brazilian Top Team Boston, the first recognized BTT dojo in the United States. In 2021, Daniel Gazoni and Levi Moura opened a second location in Back Bay called Brazilian Top Team Back Bay
- Boca Raton, Florida – João C. Amaral
- West Palm Beach, Florida – João C. Amaral
- Melbourne, Florida – Edgard Dutra (BJJ black belt), BTT Florida
  - Cocoa Beach, Florida – satellite school in cooperation with Force Fitness Gym
- San Antonio, Texas – Diego Gamonal Nogueira (BJJ black belt), BTT Texas
- Happy Valley, Oregon – Gustavo Bessa (BJJ black belt and Professional MMA Fighter), BTT Happy Valley
- Phuket, Thailand – Tiger Muay Thai, Fernando Maccachero (BJJ black belt)
- Austin, Texas – BTT Austin
- Charlotte, North Carolina-BTT Charlotte
- Richardson, Texas – BTT North Dallas, Leonardo Machado
- Malta - BTT Malta, Head Coach Sergio De Andrade Cabral
- Tallinn, Estonia – BTT Estonia, Sergio De Andrade Cabral
- Jacksonville, Florida – Marcello Salazar
- Humble, Texas- Darren McCall, 3rd Degree Black Belt
- Hamilton, Bermuda- Marcos Tulio, 3rd Degree Black Belt
- Lake Jackson, Texas – Fernando Halfeld
- Cambridge, UK – Leonardo Gamarra, 5th Degree Black Belt
- Evergreen, CO – David Roberts, 1st Degree Black Belt
- Fullerton, CA – Jaysen Jose Baxter, 3rd Degree Black Belt
- Vienna, Austria – Fernando Paulon, 5th Degree Black Belt

== Notable MMA fighters ==
- Vitor Belfort – former UFC Light-Heavyweight Champion; former competitor for UFC; former competitor for PRIDE FC; former competitor for Affliction
- David Bielkheden – former competitor for UFC
- Murilo Bustamante – former UFC middleweight champion, and PRIDE FC Welterweight Grand Prix finalist; former competitor for UFC and PRIDE FC
- Patrick Côté – competitor for UFC
- Paulo Filho – former competitor for PRIDE FC; former WEC Middleweight Champion; current competitor for DREAM
- Allan Goes – former competitor for PRIDE FC; former competitor for UFC; former competitor for IFL
- Ikuhisa Minowa – former competitor for PRIDE FC; DREAM Super Hulk (Open-Weight) Grand Prix champion
- Antônio Rodrigo Nogueira – former PRIDE FC Heavyweight Champion; former Interim Heavyweight Champion for UFC
- Antônio Rogério Nogueira – former competitor for PRIDE FC; former competitor for Affliction
- Rousimar Palhares – former WSOF Welterweight Champion
- Fernando Paulon – former competitor Cage Fight Live
- Marcello Salazar – former competitor for IFL
- Antônio Silva – former Heavyweight Champion for Elite XC; competitor for UFC; former competitor for Strikeforce
- Mario Sperry – former competitor for PRIDE FC
- Milton Vieira – competitor for UFC
- Ricardo Arona – competitor for Pride

== See also ==
- List of professional MMA training camps
