= Murilo Bustamante =

Brazilian mixed martial arts fighter (born 1966)

- Born: 30 July 1966 (age 60); Arpoador, Rio de Janeiro, Brazil
- Height: 6 ft 1 in (1.85 m)
- Weight: 185 lb (84 kg; 13.2 st)
- Division: Welterweight; Middleweight; Light Heavyweight
- Style: Brazilian Jiu-Jitsu
- Team: Brazilian Top Team
- Rank: 7th degree coral belt in Brazilian Jiu-Jitsu (under Carlson Gracie)
- Years active: 1991–2012 (MMA)

Mixed martial arts record
- Total: 24
- Wins: 15
- By knockout: 7
- By submission: 4
- By decision: 4
- Losses: 8
- By knockout: 2
- By decision: 6
- Draws: 1

Other information
- Mixed martial arts record from Sherdog

Murilo Bustamante (Portuguese pronunciation: [muˈɾilu bustɐˈmɐ̃tʃi]; born 30 July 1966) is a retired Brazilian mixed martial artist, Brazilian jiu-jitsu practitioner and former UFC Middleweight Champion.

He started practicing Brazilian jiu-jitsu when he was 10 years old, eventually receiving a black belt under Carlson Gracie. In BJJ, he was the 1999 Brazilian Champion in Absolute category and 1999 World Jiu-Jitsu Champion in the 94 kg (heavyweight) category.

He is one of the founders of the Brazilian Top Team, a BJJ and MMA academy founded by former Carlson Gracie students, and is the current leader of the team. In addition to competing for the UFC, he has also fought in PRIDE, making it to the Pride Shockwave 2005 Final, and also fought in Yarennoka!

== Background ==
Bustamante was born in coastal Rio de Janeiro and originally had dreams of professional surfing, but began training in Brazilian jiu-jitsu soon after having his first fight when he was 10 years old. He began officially competing when he was 15, before adding judo, and then began boxing when he was 18. He is a black belt under Carlson Gracie. He has won numerous world titles in Brazilian Jiu-Jitsu, which includes the World Championships of Jiu-Jitsu.

== Sports accomplishments ==
Murilo's grappling accomplishments include Championships at the World Class level, as well as appearances at the ADCC World Submission Wrestling Championships. In Brazilian Jiu-Jitsu, he has won The Mundials World Championships in 1999 and has won the Brazilian National Championship 4 times.

In ADCC, he competed at the 88–98 kg in both 1999 and 2000, and the Absolute tournament in 1999. He managed a record of 3–2 with his losses coming by way of points over submission.

=== Vale Tudo career ===
Bustamante started in Vale Tudo in 1991 with the Desafio – Jiu-Jitsu vs. Luta Livre event. Bustamante fought Luta Livre representative Marcelo Mendes, defeating him by technical knockout due to injury 4:42 into the match.

Bustamante returned to Vale Tudo in 1996, defeating Joe Charles by arm-triangle choke at Universal Vale Tudo Fighting 2 on June 24. Later that year, he competed in the MARS: Martial Arts Reality Superfighting tournament in Birmingham, Alabama, where he defeated Chris Haseman by corner stoppage and Juan Mott by submission to punches before facing the much larger Tom Erikson in the tournament final, which ended in a 40-minute draw. In September 1997, Bustamante defeated Jerry Bohlander by knockout via an upkick at Pentagon Combat in Rio de Janeiro, finishing the period with an undefeated record of 5 wins and 1 draw.

=== UFC career ===
Bustamante signed a four-fight deal with the UFC and faced Yoji Anjo in his promotional debut at UFC 25 on 14 April 2000. He won the debut via second-round submission.

He then moved up to light heavyweight to face future champion Chuck Liddell at UFC 33 on 28 September 2001. He lost the fight via unanimous decision which was hotly contested.

After the controversial loss, Bustamante decided to move back to middleweight division, receiving an immediate title shot against reigning champion Dave Menne at UFC 35 on 11 January 2002. He claimed the championship via second-round technical knockout.

As the final fight of his contract and the first title defense, Bustamante faced Matt Lindland at UFC 37 on 10 May 2002. Lindland allegedly tapped to an armbar in the first round and referee McCarthy waved the bout off. Lindland immediately claimed that he did not tap out and McCarthy resumed the once-finished bout. Eventually, Bustamante submitted Lindland in the third round and successfully defended his title.

Bustamante was offered a new contract by the UFC, with a permission to entertain other offers as a free agent. However, when finding out UFC had the best offer on the market and returned to negotiations with them, the organization had lowered their offer to a level preceding the Lindland fight.

=== Post-UFC career ===
Bustamante ended up signing with PRIDE in 2003.

He was a finalist of the PRIDE Welterweight Tournament 2005 on 31 December. After two impressive victories via an armbar and a TKO, defeating Ikuhisa Minowa and Masanori Suda respectively, Bustamante entered the finals against Dan Henderson. In the finals, Bustamante dropped an extremely close split decision to the two-time PRIDE champion.

Murilo dedicates his time to teach Brazilian jiu-jitsu, submission grappling and MMA to his students for all levels at Brazilian Top Team training camps, as well as seminars all over the world.

Murilo was scheduled to fight at Superior Challenge 6 and would have faced Tor Troeng.

Bustamante was scheduled to face Yuya Shirai at Clube da Luta on 20 July 2011 but had to pull out of the fight due to an unspecified injury.

== Grappling credentials ==
ADCC World Submission Wrestling Championships

ADCC 2000 88–98 kg: 1st round

ADCC 1999 88–98 kg: Semi finals. (Note: Murilo defeated Ricardo Almeida by points, but was unable to continue the tournament.) Absolute: Quarter finals.

Record of opponents:

- Won:, Dexter Casey (sub), Ivan Salaverry (pts), Ricardo Almeida (pts),
- Lost: Mike Van Arsdale (pts), Ricco Rodriguez (pts)

CBJJ World Championships

1999 Black Belt Pesado: 1st Place

1998 Black Belt Pesado: 3rd Place Black Belt Absolute: 3rd Place

1996 Black Belt Pesado: 2nd Place

== Championships and accomplishments ==
- PRIDE Fighting Championships
  - 2005 PRIDE Welterweight Grand Prix Runner Up
- Ultimate Fighting Championship
  - UFC Middleweight Championship (1 Time)
    - One successful title defense
    - First ever Brazilian titleholder in UFC history
  - UFC Encyclopedia Awards
    - Knockout of the Night (One time) vs. Dave Menne
    - Submission of the Night (Two times) vs. Yoji Anjo and Matt Lindland
- MMA Fighting
  - 2002 Middleweight Fighter of the Year

== Instructor lineage ==
Kano Jigoro → Tomita Tsunejiro → Mitsuyo "Count Koma" Maeda → Carlos Gracie, Sr. → Carlson Gracie → Murilo Bustamante

== Mixed martial arts record ==
Professional record breakdown
24 matches	15 wins	8 losses
By knockout	7	2
By submission	4	0
By decision	4	6
Draws	1	

Res.	Record	Opponent	Method	Event	Date	Round	Time	Location	Notes
Win	15–8–1	Dave Menne	Decision (unanimous)	AFC - Amazon Forest Combat 2	31 March 2012	3	5:00	Manaus, Brazil	
Loss	14–8–1	Jesse Taylor	TKO (retirement)	Impact FC 2 - The Uprising: Sydney	18 July 2010	2	2:10	Sydney, Australia	
Loss	14–7–1	Makoto Takimoto	Decision (split)	Yarennoka!	31 December 2007	2	5:00	Saitama, Japan	
Win	14–6–1	Ryuta Sakurai	KO (punch)	Deep: 29 Impact	13 April 2007	1	3:50	Tokyo, Japan	
Win	13–6–1	Dong Sik Yoon	Decision (unanimous)	Pride - Bushido 13	5 November 2006	2	5:00	Yokohama, Japan	
Loss	12–6–1	Amar Suloev	Decision (unanimous)	Pride - Bushido 11	4 June 2006	2	5:00	Saitama, Japan	
Loss	12–5–1	Dan Henderson	Decision (split)	Pride Shockwave 2005	31 December 2005	2	5:00	Saitama, Japan	PRIDE Welterweight Grand Prix Final.
Win	12–4–1	Ikuhisa Minowa	TKO (soccer kicks)	Pride Bushido 9	25 September 2005	1	9:51	Tokyo, Japan	PRIDE Welterweight Grand Prix Semi-Final.
Win	11–4–1	Masanori Suda	Submission (armbar)	Pride Bushido 9	25 September 2005	1	3:20	Tokyo, Japan	PRIDE Welterweight Grand Prix Opening round.
Win	10–4–1	Ryuta Sakurai	Decision (unanimous)	Pride Bushido 6	3 April 2005	2	5:00	Yokohama, Japan	
Loss	9–4–1	Kazuhiro Nakamura	Decision (unanimous)	Pride Final Conflict 2004	15 August 2004	3	5:00	Saitama, Japan	
Loss	9–3–1	Dan Henderson	TKO (knee and punches)	Pride Final Conflict 2003	9 November 2003	1	0:53	Tokyo, Japan	PRIDE Middleweight Grand Prix Reserve Bout.
Loss	9–2–1	Quinton Jackson	Decision (split)	Pride Total Elimination 2003	10 August 2003	3	5:00	Saitama, Japan	PRIDE Middleweight Grand Prix Quarterfinal.
Win	9–1–1	Matt Lindland	Submission (guillotine choke)	UFC 37	10 May 2002	3	1:33	Bossier City, Louisiana, United States	Defended the UFC Middleweight Championship. Bustamante was stripped of the title on October 5, 2002 after signing with PRIDE
Win	8–1–1	Dave Menne	TKO (punches)	UFC 35	11 January 2002	2	0:44	Uncasville, Connecticut, United States	Won the UFC Middleweight Championship.
Loss	7–1–1	Chuck Liddell	Decision (unanimous)	UFC 33	28 September 2001	3	5:00	Las Vegas, Nevada, United States	Light Heavyweight bout
Win	7–0–1	Sanae Kikuta	Decision (unanimous)	Pancrase - Trans 6	31 October 2000	1	15:00	Tokyo, Japan	
Win	6–0–1	Yoji Anjo	Submission (arm-triangle choke)	UFC 25	14 April 2000	2	0:31	Tokyo, Japan	
Win	5–0–1	Jerry Bohlander	KO (upkick)	Pentagon Combat	27 September 1997	1	5:38	Rio de Janeiro, Brazil	
Draw	4–0–1	Tom Erikson	Draw	Martial Arts Reality Superfighting	22 November 1996	1	40:00	Birmingham, Alabama, United States	
Win	4–0	Juan Mott	TKO (submission to punches)	Martial Arts Reality Superfighting	22 November 1996	1	1:08	Birmingham, Alabama, United States	
Win	3–0	Chris Haseman	TKO (corner stoppage)	Martial Arts Reality Superfighting	22 November 1996	1	1:01	Birmingham, Alabama, United States	
Win	2–0	Joe Charles	Submission (arm-triangle choke)	Universal Vale Tudo Fighting 2	24 June 1996	1	3:08	Brazil	
Win	1–0	Marcelo Mendes	TKO (injury)	Desafio-Jiu-Jitsu vs. Luta Livre	26 September 1991	1	4:42	Rio de Janeiro, Brazil	

Awards and achievements
Preceded by Dave Menne	2nd UFC Middleweight Champion; 11 January 2002 - 5 October 2002	Vacant Bustamante joined Pride FC Title next held by Evan Tanner
