= Carlson Gracie =

Brazilian Jiu-Jitsu practitioner

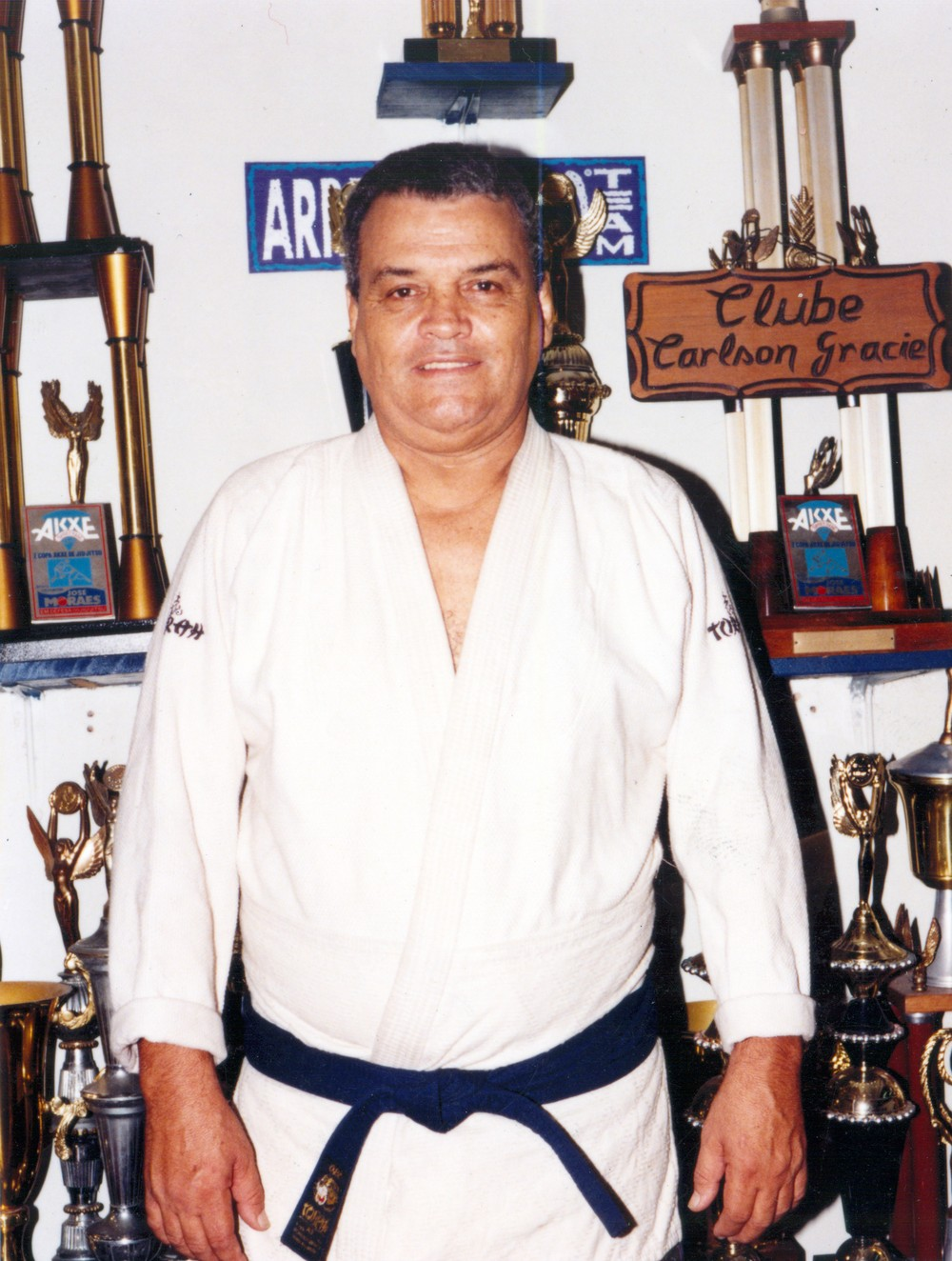
- Carlson Gracie in 1999
- Born: August 13, 1932; Rio de Janeiro, Brazil
- Died: February 1, 2006 (aged 73); Chicago, Illinois, U.S.
- Other names: Champion
- Height: 180 cm (5 ft 11 in)
- Weight: 67–72 kg (148–159 lb; 10 st 8 lb – 11 st 5 lb)
- Style: Brazilian jiu-jitsu
- Fighting out of: Rio de Janeiro, Chicago, Illinois
- Team: Carlson Gracie Team
- Teachers: Carlos Gracie, Helio Gracie
- Rank: 9th deg. BJJ red belt

Other information
- Notable students: Allan Goes, Murilo Bustamante, Mario Sperry, Marcus Soares, Wallid Ismail, André Pederneiras, Ricardo Liborio, Marcelo Saporito, Julio "Foca" Fernandez, “Leblon” Rodrigo Medeiros, Vitor Belfort, Stephan Bonnar, Javier Vazquez, Carlos "Carlão" Santos, Carlos Barreto, Francisco "Toco" Albuquerque, Crezio de Souza, Joe Rogan, Roan Carneiro
- Website: carlsongraciechicago.com

Carlson Gracie (August 13, 1932 – February 1, 2006) was a practitioner of Brazilian jiu-jitsu. A member of the Gracie family, he was the eldest son of Carlos Gracie, and nephew to Hélio Gracie, founders of Gracie jiu-jitsu.

Carlson Gracie is considered one of the most important and influential Brazilian jiu-jitsu practitioners. He played a major role in bridging the traditional Gracie jiu-jitsu of the early 20th century from a traditional self-defense system into a competitive sport and a foundation of modern mixed martial arts. He and his students created various innovative techniques and strategies which revolutionized Jiu-Jitsu. He advocated for a "warrior style", which emphasized physical prowess, aggressiveness, heavy top pressure, takedowns and cross-training to disciplines such as Judo and Wrestling to better one's game. Gracie also believed in the philosophy that the only way to advance was to test yourself, while also sharing knowledge openly rather than keeping jiu-jitsu secret. His academy helped pioneer a team-based competitive culture in Brazilian jiu-jitsu, producing a generation of elite practitioners and contributing to the development of modern competitive BJJ. The difference in styles and coaching methods led to a rivalry with Hélio Gracie's branch of more orthodox jiu-jitsu.

He was also a mixed martial arts pioneer, having participated in multiple vale tudo matches in the 1950s and 1960s. His academy had one of the first programs for specific training for MMA, and Gracie also served as a cornerman for many of his fighters during the early era of modern MMA. Many of his students would become world champions and go on to establish their own academies.

== Career ==
The oldest son of Carlos Gracie, who founded Gracie jiu-jitsu in Rio de Janeiro during the 1920s, Carlson reigned as world champion for thirty years covering the '50s, '60s and '70s.

Carlson catapulted to fame at the age of 23 when he avenged the defeat of his uncle Helio Gracie. A former student of Helio's, Waldemar Santana, had defeated the much older Helio during a match in 1955. That match lasted four hours. Carlson's rematch with Santana in 1956 was a much shorter affair: four rounds of vicious vale-tudo combat came to draw.

Carlson fought a total of eighteen vale tudo fights, with only one loss to Luta Livre fighter Euclides Pereira in a fight that was held in Bahia. His first fight was on March 17, 1953, against capoeira practitioner Luiz "Cirandinha" Aguiar, apprentice of Mestre Sinhozinho. Carlson won by submission due to mounted strikes after a tough fight. His second match was a draw against another capoeirista, Wilson "Passarito" Oliveira, in May 1953. Carlson had a rematch with Passarito in March 1954 in the longest fight of his career, which he won in the fifth 30 minute round. Most notable are his four matches with Valdemar Santana, who had defeated his uncle Hélio Gracie in a fabled match in May 1955. He beat Santana in the first fight avenging his family. In October 1955 Carlson fought Santana to a draw in a jiu-jitsu match. In 1956 and 1957 Carlson won two fights and in 1959 they fought to a draw.

After retiring from competition in 1970, Carlson Gracie devoted himself to coaching and established his own academy in Copacabana, Rio de Janeiro. Unlike the more exclusive Gracie Academy, Carlson's gym welcomed students from different social backgrounds and emphasized competition, with Carlson openly sharing his techniques with his students. He developed a large training group that became known as the Carlson Gracie Team, using group classes and intense competition between teammates to develop fighters. Because there were relatively few tournaments in Brazil during the 1970s, Carlson would even invite students from other academies to train with his team so that his fighters could continually test themselves and identify weaknesses. The academy subsequently became one of the dominant forces in Brazilian jiu-jitsu competition during the 1970s, 1980s and early 1990s, producing numerous elite practitioners. Carlson also encouraged his students to supplement jiu-jitsu with physical conditioning and training in other martial arts. His students were encouraged to develop their physical strengths and to cross-train in disciplines such as boxing and judo, reflecting Carlson's belief that practitioners should continually test and expand their abilities rather than remain confined to a single system. This approach contributed to the more physically demanding and competition-oriented style associated with the Carlson Gracie Team.

Carlson's academy developed alongside the Gracie Academy associated with Hélio Gracie, and the two schools developed a rivalry as they represent differented approaches to the teaching and development of jiu-jitsu. While Carlson placed greater emphasis on large-scale training, physical preparation, and frequent competition, Hélio's school maintained a more traditional approach, emphasizing technical efficiency, leverage, and the application of jiu-jitsu for self-defense, and catered to more heavily to students from higher-income social backgrounds. Despite this, the rivalry between the two academies remained rooted in their shared Gracie lineage, with practitioners from both schools continuing to contribute to the development and spread of Brazilian jiu-jitsu. The two branches also found themselves broadly aligned in their opposition to Luta Livre, particularly as tensions between the two martial arts increased in Rio de Janeiro during the 1980s and early 1990s. Although the rivalry between the Gracie academies persisted, the conflict with luta livre provided a common cause for practitioners from different jiu-jitsu lineages, contributing to the formation of a broader jiu-jitsu community. This was particularly evident in 1991, when representatives of luta livre confronted practitioners at a jiu-jitsu tournament in Rio de Janeiro after provocation from Gracie's student Wallid Ismail. Carlson Gracie and Marcelo Behring took the lead in organizing the jiu-jitsu response, with several of his students, including Amaury Bitetti, Wallid Ismail, and Murilo Bustamante. Fábio Gurgel, although a student of Romero Cavalcanti and a rival of Carlson's team, also joined the Carlson academy temporarily to prepare for the challenge. Carlson subsequently took charge of negotiations over the matchups for the challenge, which was held on August 31, 1991, and broadcast on Brazilian television at Rede Globo. The event resulted in a 3–0 victory for the jiu-jitsu team and helped bring vale-tudo and BJJ to a wider audience. The event also preceded the creation of the UFC by two years, with journalist Marcelo Alonso describing the 1991 challenge as a precursor to the subsequent international expansion of jiu-jitsu through Royce Gracie's (which represented Hélio Gracie's school) victories in the Ultimate Fighting Championship.

Carlson Gracie trained many top competitors, including, among many others, Ricardo De La Riva, Allan Goes, Murilo Bustamante, Mário Sperry, Wallid Ismail, Pablo Popovitch, Vauvenargues "Marinho" Vicentini, André Pederneiras, and Ricardo Liborio. He was also responsible for introducing Vitor Belfort to Gracie jiu-jitsu. Judoka Ezequiel Paraguassu trained under Carlson Gracie to better his newaza for his participation at the 1988 Olympics in Seoul, and helped popularize the sode guruma jime (or the Ezequiel Choke) to jiu-jitsu.

Carlson Gracie is also credited with popularizing the term "Creonte" within Brazilian jiu-jitsu to describe a student whom he considered disloyal for leaving his academy or changing affiliations. The term was reportedly derived from the character Creonte Silveira, a manipulative and disloyal character in the Brazilian television soap opera Mandala, which aired from 1987 to 1988. The expression subsequently became associated with practitioners who changed teams or academies, particularly among Carlson Gracie's students and their successors. One of the earliest students to receive the label was André Pederneiras, a Carlson Gracie black belt who began teaching American fighter John Lewis in the early 1990s. Carlson objected to Pederneiras teaching foreign fighters and called him a "Creonte", a term that Pederneiras later recounted being given by his former instructor. Journalist Marcelo Alonso, one of the first Brazilian journalists to specialize in vale-tudo, mixed martial arts, and Brazilian jiu-jitsu, recalled that Carlson also jokingly called him a "fotógrafo creontão da pesada" ("hardcore Creonte photographer") in 1993 after seeing a portfolio containing photographs of athletes from rival academies. In the late 1990s and early 2000s, the term became particularly associated with the fragmentation of Carlson Gracie's team. In 2000, several of Carlson's prominent students, including Murilo Bustamante, Ricardo Libório, Mário Sperry and Luís Roberto Duarte, left the team and established Brazilian Top Team, which initially focused on producing professional mixed martial artists. Carlson regarded the departure of many of his former students as a breach of loyalty and referred to those who left as "Creontes".

Carlson Gracie trained Stephan Bonnar, a finalist in the UFC reality show The Ultimate Fighter 1. He was in Bonnar's corner during his fight against eventual The Ultimate Fighter winner Forrest Griffin. He is the author of a book on the subject of Jiu Jitsu titled Brazilian jiu-jitsu: For Experts Only, which includes his student Julio "Foca" Fernandez.

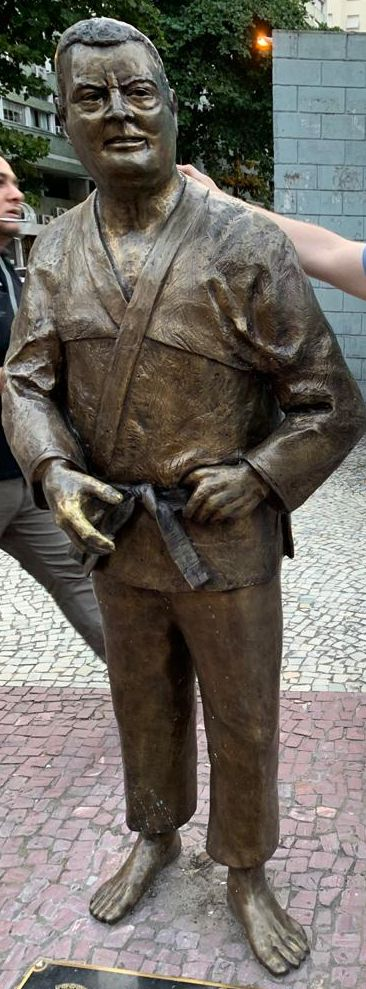
Carlson Gracie statue in Copacabana, Rio de Janeiro.

Carlson's influence on no-holds-barred fighting and mixed martial arts is extensive as well, for the style of jiu-jitsu he taught at his academy was distinct from that being taught by Helio. While Helio's brand of jiu-jitsu emphasized defensive techniques aiming to allow the smaller and weaker to defeat the stronger opponent, Carlson and his brothers Carley Gracie and Rolls Gracie favored a much more active, 'warrior style' of jiu-jitsu that encouraged physical prowess and barraging your opponent with a series of attacks.

Some of Carlson's lineage can be seen in the creation of some of the greatest MMA gyms in the world: Brazilian Top Team, Nova União, American Top Team and Black House were all founded by Carlson Gracie's black belts.

== Death ==
Carlson Gracie died on February 1, 2006, in Chicago, Illinois, of heart failure, apparently the result of complications of kidney stones (and possibly his pre-existing diabetes), following a hospitalization of several days. At the time of his death he was a ninth degree red belt and was referred to as Grandmaster.

A bronze statue was installed next to his gym in Rio de Janeiro on August 12, 2019.

== Instructor lineage ==
Kano Jigoro → Tomita Tsunejiro → Mitsuyo "Count Koma" Maeda → Carlos Gracie Sr. →Helio Gracie→ Carlson Gracie.

== Personal life ==
Carlson had three children and two grandchildren. Gracie was a close friend of Wing Chun Grandmaster Samuel Kwok, and the two often toured and held seminars together.

== Documentary ==
On July 6, 2023, it was announced that ESPN Films is producing a documentary series on the Gracie family directed by Chris Fuller and produced by Greg O'Connor and Guy Ritchie.

== See also ==
- Creonte - a term said to have been coined by Carlson
- List of Brazilian jiu-jitsu practitioners
