= 1993 in UFC =

Mixed martial arts events

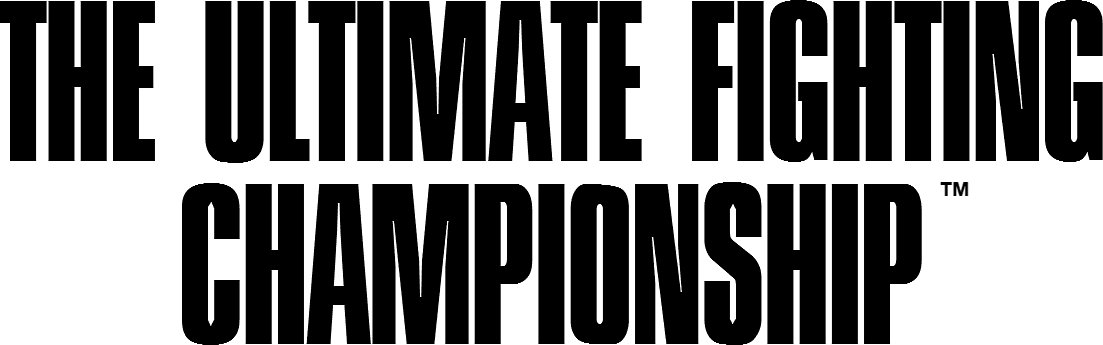

Information
- First date: November 12, 1993
- Last date: November 12, 1993

Events
- Total events: 1
- UFC: 1

Fights
- Total fights: 8

Chronology
1993 in UFC	1994 in UFC

The year 1993 was the 1st year in the history of the Ultimate Fighting Championship (UFC), a mixed martial arts promotion based in the United States. 1993 had only 1 UFC event, UFC 1.

== Debut UFC fighters ==
Given that this is the UFC's debut year, all fighters listed participated in their UFC debut.

ISO	Fighter
(United States)	Art Jimmerson
(Netherlands)	Gerard Gordeau
(United States)	Jason DeLucia
(United States)	Ken Shamrock

ISO	Fighter
(United States)	Kevin Rosier
(United States)	Patrick Smith
(Brazil)	Royce Gracie

ISO	Fighter
(United States)	Teila Tuli
(United States)	Trent Jenkins
(United States)	Zane Frazier

== Events list ==
#	Event	Date	Venue	Location	Attendance
001	UFC 1: The Beginning	Nov 12, 1993	McNichols Sports Arena	Denver, Colorado, U.S.	7,800

== See also ==
- List of UFC champions
- List of UFC events
