= 1994 in UFC =

Mixed martial arts events

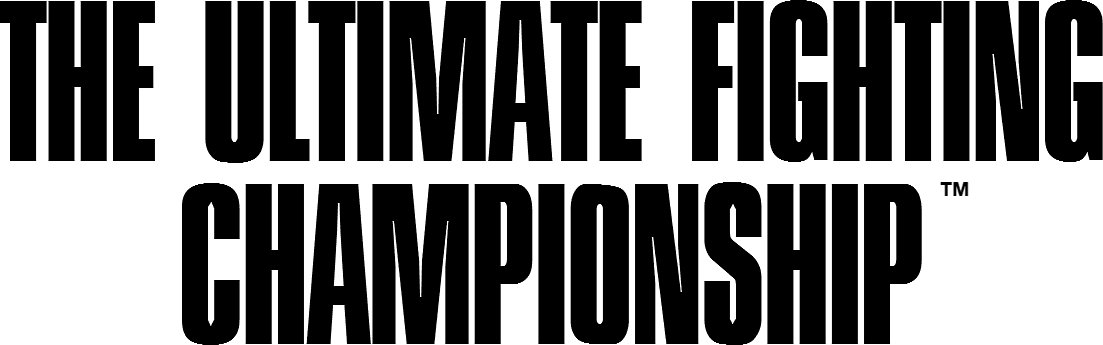

Information
- First date: March 11, 1994
- Last date: December 16, 1994

Events
- Total events: 3
- UFC: 3

Fights
- Total fights: 32

Chronology
1993 in UFC	1994 in UFC	1995 in UFC

The year 1994 was the 2nd year in the history of the Ultimate Fighting Championship (UFC), a mixed martial arts promotion based in the United States. In 1994 the UFC held 3 events beginning with, UFC 2.

== Debut UFC fighters ==
The following fighters fought their first UFC fight in 1994:

ISO	Fighter
(United States)	Alberto Cerro Leon
(United States)	Anthony Macias
(United States)	Christophe Leininger
(United States)	Dan Severn
(United States)	David Levicki
(Brazil)	Eldo Dias Xavier
(United States)	Emmanuel Yarborough
(United States)	Felix Mitchell
(United States)	Frank Hamaker
(United States)	Fred Ettish
(United States)	Guy Mezger

ISO	Fighter
(Canada)	Harold Howard
(United States)	Jason Fairn
(United States)	Joe Charles
(United States)	Joe Son
(United States)	Johnny Rhodes
(United States)	Keith Hackney
(United States)	Kimo Leopoldo
(United States)	Marcus Bossett
(United States)	Melton Bowen
(Japan)	Minoki Ichihara
(United States)	Orlando Wiet

ISO	Fighter
(United States)	Ray Wizard
(Netherlands)	Remco Pardoel
(United States)	Robert Lucarelli
(United States)	Roland Payne
(United States)	Ron van Clief
(United States)	Scott Baker
(United States)	Scott Morris
(United States)	Sean Daugherty
(United States)	Steve Jennum
(United States)	Thaddeus Luster

== Events list ==
#	Event	Date	Venue	Location	Attendance
004	UFC 4: Revenge of the Warriors	Dec 16, 1994	Expo Square Pavilion	Tulsa, Oklahoma, U.S.	5,857
003	UFC 3: The American Dream	Sep 9, 1994	Grady Cole Center	Charlotte, North Carolina, U.S.	3,000
002	UFC 2: No Way Out	Mar 11, 1994	Mammoth Gardens	Denver, Colorado, U.S.	2,000

== See also ==
- UFC
- List of UFC champions
- List of UFC events
