= Patrick Smith (fighter) =

American kickboxer, martial artist, and mixed martial artist (1963–2019)

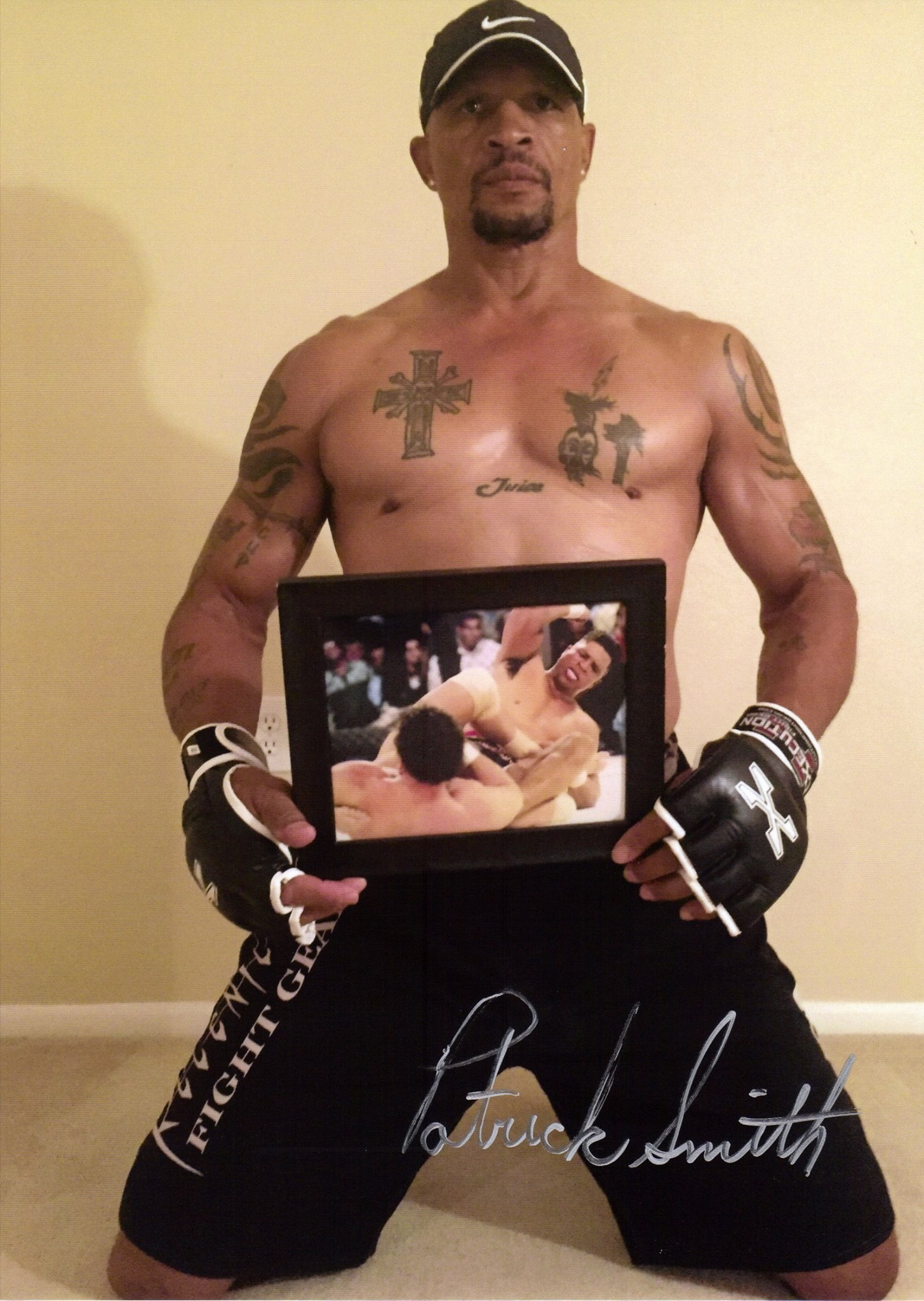
- Patrick Smith in 2015
- Born: August 28, 1963; Coalgate, Oklahoma, U.S.
- Died: June 18, 2019 (aged 55); Colorado, U.S.
- Height: 6 ft 2 in (1.88 m)
- Weight: 225 lb (102 kg; 16.1 st)
- Division: Heavyweight (MMA); Heavyweight (kickboxing)
- Style: Kickboxing, Boxing, Taekwondo
- Stance: Orthodox
- Fighting out of: Perris, California
- Rank: 3rd dan black belt in Taekwondo; Black belt in Tang Soo Do; Black belt in Hapkido; Black belt in Kempo Karate; Purple belt in Brazilian Jiu-Jitsu
- Years active: 1993—2016

Professional boxing record
- Total: 18
- Wins: 5
- By knockout: 4
- Losses: 11
- By knockout: 11
- Draws: 2

Kickboxing record
- Total: 74
- Wins: 66
- Losses: 8

Mixed martial arts record
- Total: 36
- Wins: 20
- By knockout: 13
- By submission: 6
- By decision: 1
- Losses: 16
- By knockout: 9
- By submission: 5
- By decision: 1
- By disqualification: 1

Other information
- Boxing record from BoxRec
- Mixed martial arts record from Sherdog

Patrick Smith (August 28, 1963 – June 18, 2019) was an American kickboxer and mixed martial artist. He started his mixed martial arts career by participating in the first two Ultimate Fighting Championship events.

He was a 3rd degree black belt in Tae Kwon Do and also held a black belt in Hapkido, Kempo Karate, and Tang Soo Do. In 1993, Smith was ranked No. 1 as a Super Heavyweight Kickboxer in the United States and held a ranking of No. 5 internationally. He was the 1993 Enshin Karate Sabaki Challenge Heavyweight champion, an annual full contact karate tournament held in Denver which allows grabs, sweeps and throws, and competed in the 1993 Seidokaikan full contact Karate World Cup tournament in Japan.

== Kickboxing career ==
Patrick Smith first rose to fame in the US for his kickboxing prowess. In 1994 he entered the K-1 Grand Prix '94 where he caused one of the biggest upsets in K-1 history by flooring three times and subsequently knocking out legendary karateka and future K-1 star Andy Hug with an uppercut after just 19 seconds of the first round in their quarterfinal match. Smith was unable to build on this success as he was soundly defeated by eventual champion Peter Aerts in the semifinals. Some pundits, most notoriously Dave Meltzer, have expressed their belief that Hug's loss was a fight fixed in order to increase Smith's popularity.

After the Hug victory, Smith's K-1 career never took off. He lost to Andy Hug in a rematch at the K-1 Revenge event and then failed to qualify for the following year's K-1 Grand Prix at K-1 Grand Prix '95 Opening Battle. His last match in K-1 was against rising local star Musashi, a match he lost by KO, and he was released from his K-1 contract, finishing 1 and 4 with the organization. Despite little international success, Smith had more success at home, accumulating an overall 66-8 kickboxing record by the time he retired in 2000.

== Mixed martial arts career ==
=== Ultimate Fighting Championship ===
Smith participated the first Ultimate Fighting Championship event, UFC 1, in November 1993. The event featured an eight-man single-elimination tournament with very few rules, awarding $50,000 to the winner. Art Davie, the promoter, placed advertisements in martial arts magazines and sent letters to anyone in any martial arts directory he could find to recruit competitors for the event. With the event being held in Smith's hometown of Denver, he was an easy addition. Smith's first and only match was against shoot wrestler Ken Shamrock, who took Smith down easily and submitted him with a heel hook. The fans in Denver booed heavily as they were unaware of the submission rules and were displeased with the fact that the match ended so quickly without a knockout.

Despite his loss, Smith's performance got him invited to UFC 2, now a 16-man tournament, where he entered with the expressed intent of a shot at the previous winner Royce Gracie. Smith had spent the time between shows working on his grappling to perform better on the ground, which paid off with a victory by guillotine choke against Ray Wizard in the first round. The peak of his performance, however, came technically through striking: after being pitted against ninjutsu fighter Scott Morris in the second round, Smith dropped him with knee strikes from the clinch, mounted him on the ground, and then unloaded barrage after barrage of punches and elbow strikes, completely knocking Morris out. This finish is considered one of the most brutal in the history of UFC. Smith next fought karate expert Johnny Rhodes, whom he submitted with a second guillotine choke after a brief exchange of hits. Finally, Smith reached the finals and his desired match against Royce Gracie, but it was short and one-sided, with Gracie taking him down and landing several palm strikes from mount before the kickboxer tapped out.

Smith returned at UFC 6 facing Rudyard Moncayo, a kenpo karate stylist from Ecuador. He opened the fight in spectacular fashion by landing a running front kick to Moncayo's chest, knocking him down and sending him sliding towards the fence. Smith then followed with a takedown and gained mount position, and ultimately locked a rear naked choke when Moncayo tried to escape, making him tap out. However, Smith had to withdraw from the tournament due to stomach cramps caused by an injury sustained during the fight. He was replaced by Anthony Macias.

=== Post-UFC ===
Smith went on to fight for K-1 and Bas Rutten's first three invitationals shows, as well as fighting on a few of the World Vale Tudo Championship (WVC) events showcasing No Holds Barred fighting. At WVC 3, Smith faced Fabio Gurgel in a match that became infamous for its unusual ending. Smith grabbed the ring ropes in order to avoid being taken down and struck Gurgel's spine repeatedly with his elbow, but crowd members approached and tried to take Smith's hands off from the ropes, prompting the match to be stopped. The referee consulted with promoter Sérgio Batarelli about the situation and it was decided to call off the fight and declare Gurgel the winner. In an elimination tournament of eight fighters at WVC 5 held in Recife, Brazil on 3 February 1998, Smith withdrew ahead of his scheduled semifinal bout against Igor Vovchanchyn after he suffered a broken hand in his quarterfinal win over Marco Selva.

On April 11, 2008, Smith came in as a late replacement for Gary Goodridge and defeated Eric "Butterbean" Esch via submission due to strikes in a "Masters Superfight" at YAMMA Pit Fighting's inaugural event.

On October 10, 2015, Smith came out of retirement at age 51 to fight Dave Huckaba at Gladiator Challenge - Collision Course. He was defeated via KO at 1:33 of round 1.

== Sex offenses ==
In 1999, Smith was convicted of sexually assaulting a 14-year-old girl. He was later arrested in 2008 after failing to register as a sex offender.

== Death ==
On June 18, 2019, Smith died of sarcomatoid carcinoma of the bladder and Sarcomatoid carcinomas variant of urotherlia (SVUC) at age 55.

== Championships and accomplishments ==
=== Karate ===
- Sabaki Challenge
  - Sabaki Challenge Heavyweight Champion

=== Kickboxing ===
- Karate International Council of Kickboxing
  - KICK Super Heavyweight Champion

=== Mixed martial arts ===
- Ultimate Fighting Championship
  - UFC 2 Tournament Runner-Up
  - UFC 6 Tournament Semifinalist
  - UFC Encyclopedia Awards
    - Knockout of the Night (One time) vs. Scott Morris
  - Record for most wins in one night by a Runner-Up (three)
  - Tied (Royce Gracie) for most fights fought in one night (four)

== Kickboxing record ==
Kickboxing Record
66 Wins, 8 Losses
Date	Result	Opponent	Event	Location	Method	Round	Time
1997-06-25	Loss	(United States) Jeff Roufus		Ledyard, Connecticut, USA	TKO (Leg Kick)	2	
Fight was for K.I.C.K. Super Heavyweight World title.
1996-00-00	Win	(United States) George Clark		Loveland, Colorado, USA	KO (Backfist)	1	
1995-09-03	Loss	(Japan) Musashi	K-1 Revenge II	Yokohama, Japan	KO (Kick)	2	0:43
1995-03-03	Loss	(Australia) Stan Longinidis	K-1 Grand Prix '95 Opening Battle	Tokyo, Japan	KO (Kick)	2	2:59
Fails to qualify for K-1 Grand Prix '95.
1994-09-18	Loss	(Switzerland) Andy Hug	K-1 Revenge	Yokohama, Japan	KO (Left Knee)	1	0:56
1994-06-24	Loss	(United States) Mike Vieira		Dania Beach, Florida USA	TKO (Left Hook)	2	0:42
1994-04-30	Loss	(Netherlands) Peter Aerts	K-1 Grand Prix '94 Semifinals	Tokyo, Japan	KO (Right Overhand)	1	1:03
1994-04-30	Win	(Switzerland) Andy Hug	K-1 Grand Prix '94 Quarterfinals	Tokyo, Japan	KO (Three Knockdowns)	1	0:19
Legend: Win Loss Draw/No contest Notes

== Mixed martial arts record ==
Professional record breakdown
36 matches	20 wins	16 losses
By knockout	13	9
By submission	6	5
By decision	1	1
Unknown	0	1

Res.	Record	Opponent	Method	Event	Date	Round	Time	Location	Notes
Loss	20–16	Sean Loeffler	KO (head kick)	Gladiator Challenge: Freedom Strikes	July 23, 2016	1	0:08	El Cajon, California, United States	
Loss	20–15	Dave Huckaba	KO (punch)	Gladiator Challenge: Collision Course	October 10, 2015	1	1:33	Lincoln, California, United States	
Loss	20–14	Kevin Jordan	Decision (unanimous)	American Steel Cagefighting 1: Battle of the Legends	July 31, 2009	3	5:00	Salem, New Hampshire, United States	
Win	20–13	Brad Imes	KO (punches)	Titan FC 13	March 13, 2009	1	0:28	Kansas City, Missouri, United States	
Win	19–13	Aaron Winterlee	Submission (neck crank)	FM: Productions	March 7, 2009	1	2:22	Springfield, Missouri, United States	
Loss	18–13	Jeremiah Constant	TKO (submission to punches)	HRP: Snakebite Fight 2	October 11, 2008	1	0:42	Tulsa, Oklahoma, United States	
Win	18–12	Aaron Winterlee	Submission (guillotine choke)	Extreme Fighting League	August 16, 2008	2	1:11	Miami, Oklahoma, United States	
Win	17–12	Butterbean	TKO (submission to punches and elbows)	YAMMA Pit Fighting	April 11, 2008	1	3:17	Atlantic City, New Jersey, United States	
Win	16–12	Derrick Ruffin	TKO (punches)	FM: Productions	February 1, 2008	2	1:02	Missouri, United States	
Win	15–12	David Tyner	TKO (punches)	Oklahoma KO: Nightmare in the Jungle 1	October 27, 2007	2	2:45	Adair, Oklahoma, United States	
Win	14–12	Scott Arnold	TKO (punches)	UGC 18: Xtreme Victory	May 18, 2007	1	2:12	Quebec, Canada	
Loss	13–12	Tom Clemens	Submission (kneebar)	XFS 5: Heavy Hitters	May 12, 2007	2	1:35	Boise, Idaho, United States	
Win	13–12	Brian Stromberg	KO (punches)	Xtreme Fight Series 3	December 15, 2006	1	4:00	Boise, Idaho, United States	
Win	12–12	Vernon Earwood	TKO (knee and punches)	RMBB: Hellraisers	October 21, 2006	1	2:33	Denver, Colorado, United States	
Win	11–11	Richard Gomez	Submission (guillotine choke)	Fightfest 6	September 23, 2006	1	0:47	Corpus Christi, Texas, United States	
Win	10–11	Allan Sullivan	KO (punches)	ROF 10: Intensity	October 18, 2003	1	3:35	Colorado, United States	
Loss	9–11	Marcus Silveira	DQ (knees on a grounded opponent)	World Extreme Fighting 5	June 12, 1999	1	0:50	DeLand, Florida, United States	Smith knocked Silveira down with a punch but landed an illegal knee to a downed opponent.
Win	9–10	Chuck Gale	TKO (elbows and punches)	Bas Rutten Invitational 3	June 1, 1999	1	7:31	Littleton, Colorado, United States	
Loss	8–10	Maxim Tarasov	Submission (heel hook)	IAFC: Pankration World Championship 1999	May 1, 1999	1	3:31	Moscow, Russia	
Loss	8–9	Moti Horenstein	KO (head kick)	Bas Rutten Invitational 2	April 24, 1999	1	0:26	Littleton, Colorado, United States	
Loss	8–8	Matt Asher	TKO (punches)	Bas Rutten Invitational 1	February 6, 1999	1	0:11	Littleton, Colorado, United States	
Win	8–7	Joe Grant	TKO (submission to punches)	Bas Rutten Invitational 1	February 6, 1999	1	0:35	Littleton, Colorado, United States	
Win	7–7	David Dodd	Decision (unanimous)	Extreme Challenge 22	November 21, 1998	1	16:00	West Valley City, Utah, United States	
Win	6–7	Tony Mendoza	TKO (punches)	ES: National Championships	October 24, 1998	1	7:27	South Dakota, United States	
Win	5–7	Marco Selva	TKO (submission to punches)	World Vale Tudo Championship 5	February 3, 1998	1	4:35	Recife, Brazil	
Loss	4–7	Marco Ruas	Submission (heel hook)	World Vale Tudo Championship 4	March 16, 1997	1	0:39	Rio de Janeiro, Brazil	
Loss	4–6	Fabio Gurgel	TKO (retirement due to fan interference)	World Vale Tudo Championship 3	January 19, 1997	1	0:50	Rio de Janeiro, Brazil	
Loss	4–5	Dave Beneteau	TKO (submission to punches	U: Japan	November 17, 1996	1	1:09	Tokyo, Japan	
Loss	4–4	Kiyoshi Tamura	Submission (heel hook)	K-1 Hercules	December 9, 1995	1	0:55	Nagoya, Japan	
Win	4–3	Rudyard Moncayo	Submission (rear-naked choke)	UFC 6	July 14, 1995	1	1:08	Casper, Wyoming, United States	
Loss	3–3	Kimo Leopoldo	TKO (submission to punches)	K-1 Legend	December 10, 1994	1	3:00	Nagoya, Japan	
Loss	3–2	Royce Gracie	TKO (submission to punches)	UFC 2	March 11, 1994	1	1:17	Denver, Colorado, United States	UFC 2 Tournament Finals.
Win	3–1	Johnny Rhodes	Submission (guillotine choke)	UFC 2	March 11, 1994	1	1:07	Denver, Colorado, United States	UFC 2 Tournament Semi-Finals.
Win	2–1	Scott Morris	TKO (elbows)	UFC 2	March 11, 1994	1	0:30	Denver, Colorado, United States	UFC 2 Tournament Quarter-Finals.
Win	1–1	Ray Wizard	Submission (guillotine choke)	UFC 2	March 11, 1994	1	0:58	Denver, Colorado, United States	UFC 2 Tournament Qualifying Round.
Loss	0–1	Ken Shamrock	Technical Submission (heel hook)	UFC 1	November 12, 1993	1	1:49	Denver, Colorado, United States	UFC 1 Tournament Qualifying Round.

== Professional boxing record ==
5 Wins (4 knockouts, 1 decision), 11 Losses (11 knockouts), 2 Draws
Result	Record	Opponent	Type	Round	Date	Location	Notes
Loss	5–11–2	(United States) Kendrick Releford	KO	1	June 13, 2009	(United States) Batesville Armory, Batesville, Arkansas, U.S.	Smith knocked out at 0:40 of the first round.
Loss	5–10–2	(Grenada) Grant Cudjoe	TKO	2	August 4, 2007	(United States) Expo Square Pavilion, Tulsa, Oklahoma, U.S.	Referee stopped the bout at 0:36 of the second round.
Loss	5–9–2	(United States) Chazz Witherspoon	TKO	2	February 2, 2007	(United States) Jewish Community Center, Philadelphia, Pennsylvania	Referee stopped the bout at 1:38 of the second round.
Loss	5–8–2	(United States) Taurus Sykes	KO	3	December 12, 2006	(United States) Isleta Casino Resort, Isleta Pueblo, New Mexico, U.S.	
Loss	5–7–2	(Nigeria) Duncan Dokiwari	KO	2	August 26, 2006	(United States) Convention Center, Junction City, Kansas, U.S.	Smith knocked out at 2:33 of the second round.
Win	5–6–2	(United States) Kenny Lemos	TKO	2	June 30, 2006	(United States) Denver Coliseum, Denver, Colorado, U.S.	Referee stopped the bout at 2:58 of the second round.
Loss	4–6–2	(United States) David Bostice	TKO	3	August 12, 2005	(United States) Pepsi Center, Denver, Colorado, U.S.	Referee stopped the bout at 1:31 of the third round.
Loss	4–5–2	(Brazil) Marcelino Novaes	TKO	2	July 23, 2004	(United States) Agua Caliente Casino Resort Spa, Rancho Mirage, California, U.S.	Referee stopped the bout at 3:00 of the second round.
Draw	4–4–2	(United States) Preston Hartzog	PTS	6	June 11, 2004	(United States) Longshoreman's Hall, San Francisco, California, U.S.	56-58, 57-57, 59-55.
Draw	4–4–1	(United States) Gary "Bring Da Pain" Bell	PTS	8	May 27, 2004	(United States) Alario Center, Westwego, Louisiana, U.S.	74-76, 76-74, 75-75.
Loss	4–4	(United States) Bobby Harris	KO	2	August 31, 1994	(United States) Las Vegas, Nevada, U.S.	
Loss	4–3	(United States) Monte Oswald	TKO	2	April 21, 1994	(United States) Las Vegas, Nevada, U.S.	
Win	4–2	(Australia) Justin Fortune	KO	2	February 24, 1994	(United States) Las Vegas, Nevada, U.S.	
Win	3–2	(United States) Krishna Wainwright	PTS	6	January 12, 1994	(United States) Las Vegas, Nevada, U.S.	
Win	2–2	(United States) Randy Crippen	TKO	1	August 18, 1993	(United States) Las Vegas, Nevada, U.S.	
Loss	1–2	(United States) Will Hinton	KO	2	March 20, 1993	(United States) Denver, Colorado, U.S.	
Loss	1–1	(Tonga) Samson Po'uha	TKO	4	February 14, 1993	(United States) Las Vegas, Nevada, U.S.	
Win	1–0	Kris Sorensen	KO	1	May 12, 1992	(United States) O'Conner Fieldhouse, Caldwell, Idaho, U.S.	
