= John McCarthy (referee) =

American mixed martial arts referee (born 1962)

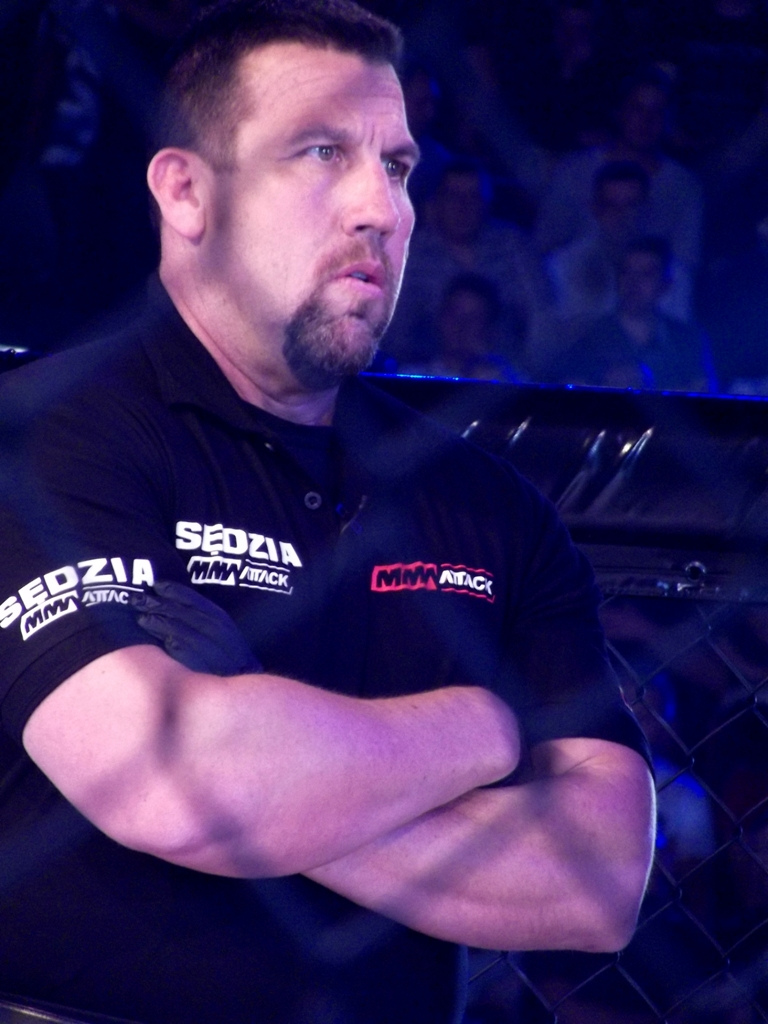
- McCarthy in 2012
- Born: John Michael McCarthy; October 12, 1962 (age 63); Los Angeles, California, U.S.
- Other name: "Big John McCarthy"
- Occupations: MMA referee, podcast host, MMA analyst

John Michael McCarthy (born October 12, 1962) is a retired American mixed martial arts (MMA) referee best known for officiating numerous bouts promoted by the Ultimate Fighting Championship (UFC), dating back to UFC 2. He is credited as being one of the greatest and most recognizable referees in combat sports history and an important figure in the mixed martial arts world, helping create the Unified Rules of MMA after initially creating the original rule book of the UFC. He currently is a commentator for the Professional Fighters League (PFL) and co-hosts the combat sports-based podcast "Weighing In" with former fighter Josh Thomson.

== Career ==
McCarthy spent some time as an officer of the Los Angeles Police Department, retiring around 2008.

In 1993, he became involved with the newly created Ultimate Fighting Championship (UFC) fighting tournament. He was the referee for UFC 2, launching a career as a UFC referee. The UFC initially started with very few rules, but McCarthy gave feedback that it was too dangerous and suggested additional rules, many of which were adopted. Saying the catch phrase originally coined by boxing referee Mills Lane, McCarthy would often start matches by saying "let's get it on" to the fighters, which became an iconic catchphrase that is associated with him and his refereeing.

The nickname of "Big John" came about because of his size and stature. He stands 6 ft 3 in (1.91 m) and weighs 265 lb (120 kg); making him larger than the majority of the athletes over whom he presides. According to a UFC interview, the nickname was given to him by UFC co-founder and promoter Art Davie. McCarthy recalls that the nickname began when he forcibly lifted Davie off the ground and held him in the air.

In 2018, McCarthy retired from UFC refereeing, and moved to Bellator as a commentator. He currently serves as a judging and rules analyst for the Professional Fighters League (PFL), who acquired Bellator in 2023.

== Awards and honors ==
- Martial Arts History Museum Hall of Fame
  - Class of 2010
- World MMA Awards
  - Referee of the Year (Three times; 2015, 2016 and 2017)

== Personal life ==
McCarthy has two sons and a daughter, one of whom has been an MMA judge since 2013. McCarthy currently resides in Tennessee.

== Published work ==
On September 1, 2011, McCarthy's autobiography, Let's Get It On - The Making of MMA and its Ultimate Referee, was published.

== Film and television ==
McCarthy had a cameo appearance in the Friends episode, "The One with the Ultimate Fighting Champion".

McCarthy also served as the referee on the MTV2 series Bully Beatdown, along with professional mixed martial artist Jason "Mayhem" Miller.

McCarthy is featured in the award-winning mixed martial arts documentary Fight Life, the film is directed by James Z. Feng and released in 2013.

McCarthy appeared in Season 3b, Episode 5 of Entourage.

McCarthy appeared at the end of the film Never Back Down 2: The Beatdown.
