= UFC 1 =

First UFC mixed martial art event (1993)

UFC 1: The Beginning
- VHS Box art for UFC 1
- Promotion: Ultimate Fighting Championship
- Date: November 12, 1993
- Venue: McNichols Sports Arena
- City: Denver, Colorado
- Attendance: 7,800
- Buyrate: 86,000

Event chronology
UFC 1: The Beginning	UFC 2: No Way Out

The Ultimate Fighting Championship (later renamed UFC 1: The Beginning) was the first mixed martial arts event by the Ultimate Fighting Championship (UFC), held at the McNichols Sports Arena in Denver, Colorado, United States, on November 12, 1993. The event was broadcast live on pay-per-view and later released on home video.

The event was the lowest profile by the contemporary standards. The venue was less than half-packed, and the grand prize of the tournament was as big as a regular sparring partner's biannual salary. Major martial-arts observers and columnists did not bother to show up; the press neglected the event, and Black Belt mentioned it only several months later. Big-name fighters turned down the offers to participate or to make a guest appearance in the audience.

The event pioneered the interstylistic match-ups between the practitioners of different martial arts, and set the pattern for the future sporting events of the kind. UFC 1 would also be the first ever martial-arts event to use the octagon.

== Background ==
UFC 1 was co-created by Rorion Gracie and the Torrance-based UFC promoter Art Davie, who decided to take locally famous Gracie Garage Challenge fights versus California's martial artists to a new level, televised nationally, with the opponents picked internationally.

They did not come up with a 16-man tournament, as the big-name martial artists, mainly kickboxers, namely Dennis Alexio, Benny Urquidez, Jean-Yves Thériault, Rick Roufus, Stan Longinidis, Maurice Smith, Bart Vale, Hee Il Cho, George Dillman, Gene LeBell, Rob Kaman, Peter Aerts, Ernesto Hoost, Masaaki Satake, were among the others "publicly invited" by Art Davie, but had shown no interest in participating. Davie placed advertisements in martial arts magazines to recruit fighters. He found less than a dozen who answered the call. The promoters came up with an eight-man tournament format, with the winner receiving $50,000.

They wanted it to look brutal on television, so John Milius, one of Rorion Gracie's students and a Hollywood veteran who had directed Conan the Barbarian, decided the fights should take place in an octagonal cage fenced with chain link. Campbell McLaren, a SEG executive, wanted people to consider the championship a live, televised version of Mortal Kombat, a popular fighting video game, in which victorious fighters got to "finish" their opponents through moves such as ripping their spines out of their bodies. That one and the Davie's idea to top the cage with razor wire were rejected. UFC promoters initially pitched the event as a real-life fighting video game tournament similar to Mortal Kombat and Street Fighter.

General regulations agreed upon were:

- No doping probes.
- No holds barred.
- No biting.
- No eye-gouging.
- No mandatory gloves and combative uniform (bare-knuckle contest).
- No judges' scores.
- Unlimited five-minute rounds with one-minute rest period in between. (Changed to no time limits for UFC 2 since no UFC 1 fight lasted five minutes.)
- Knockout, tapout, or corner stoppage (indicated by towel) are the only determination methods. Referee could only halt a match pending the corner decision.

McNichols Sports Arena in Denver, at an elevation above mean sea level of approximately one mile (1.6 km), had been chosen because Colorado had no athletic commission and thus no governing body from which they would need to get approval for bare-knuckle fighting. The arena had hosted only two fight cards in its history, both of minor significance, occurring earlier in 1993.

The major accomplishment though for the promoters was to gather a celebrity commentary team for the event. The commentary team for the pay-per-view was Bill Wallace, Jim Brown, and Kathy Long, with additional analysis from Rod Machado and post-fight interviews by Brian Kilmeade. The ring announcer was Rich Goins.

Jason DeLucia was an alternate for the event, having defeated Trent Jenkins in the alternate bout. However, as no fighter pulled out during the tournament, he was not called upon.

== History ==
The tournament featured fights with no weight classes, rounds, or judges. The three rules – no biting, no eye gouging, and no groin shots – were to be enforced only by a $1,500 fine. The match only ended by submission, knockout, or the fighter's corner throwing in the towel, although the referee stopped the first fight at 26 seconds. Gloves were allowed, as Art Jimmerson showed in his quarterfinal bout against Royce Gracie, which he fought with one boxing glove.

Royce Gracie won the tournament by defeating Gerard Gordeau via submission due to a rear naked choke. The referees for UFC 1 were João Alberto Barreto and Hélio Vigio, two veteran vale tudo referees from Brazil.

== Results ==
Final
Weight class				Method	Round	Time	Notes
N/A	Royce Gracie	def.	Gerard Gordeau	Submission (rear-naked choke)		1:44
Alternate bout
N/A	Jason DeLucia	def.	Trent Jenkins	Submission (rear-naked choke)		0:52
Semi-finals
N/A	Royce Gracie	def.	Ken Shamrock	Submission (rear-naked choke)		0:57
N/A	Gerard Gordeau	def.	Kevin Rosier	TKO (punches)		0:59
Quarter-finals
N/A	Ken Shamrock	def.	Patrick Smith	Submission (heel hook)		1:49
N/A	Royce Gracie	def.	Art Jimmerson	Submission (smother choke)		2:18
N/A	Kevin Rosier	def.	Zane Frazier	TKO (corner stoppage)		4:20
N/A	Gerard Gordeau	def.	Teila Tuli	TKO (head kick)		0:26

== UFC 1 bracket ==
Quarter-finals
(Netherlands) Gerard Gordeau (Savate)	TKO
(United States) Teila Tuli (Sumo)	0:26
(United States) Kevin Rosier (Kickboxing)	TKO
(United States) Zane Frazier (Kenpo)	4:20
(Brazil) Royce Gracie (Brazilian Jiu-Jitsu)	SUB
(United States) Art Jimmerson (Boxing)	2:18
(United States) Ken Shamrock (Shootfighting)	SUB
(United States) Patrick Smith (Taekwondo)	1:49

Semi-finals
(Netherlands) Gerard Gordeau	TKO
(United States) Kevin Rosier	0:59
(Brazil) Royce Gracie	SUB
(United States) Ken Shamrock	0:57

Final
(Netherlands) Gerard Gordeau	1:40
(Brazil) Royce Gracie	SUB

== Cultural significance ==
The event and its outcome catapulted Gracie Jiu-Jitsu (also known as Brazilian jiu-jitsu) to new heights in the United States and worldwide. Its gate and pay-per-view buys ensured that there would be more UFCs in the near future, which proved to be the case. The event sold nearly 90,000 live pay-per-view buys, in addition to drawing new audiences through video rental stores such as Blockbuster Video.

== Encyclopedia awards ==
The following fighters were honored in the October 2011 book titled UFC Encyclopedia.

- Fight of the Night: Royce Gracie vs. Ken Shamrock
- Knockout of the Night: Gerard Gordeau def. Teila Tuli
- Submission of the Night: Royce Gracie def. Gerard Gordeau

== See also ==
- 1993 in UFC
- List of UFC champions
