= Gerard Gordeau =

Dutch karateka, mixed martial artist and professional wrestler

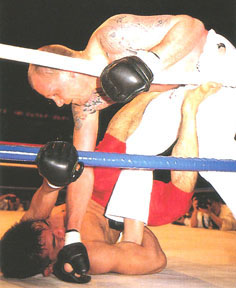
- Gerard Gordeau (top, in white gi pants) fights Yuki Nakai at Vale Tudo Japan 1995
- Born: 30 March 1956 (age 70); The Hague, Netherlands
- Height: 6 ft 5 in (1.96 m)
- Weight: 216 lb (98 kg; 15.4 st)
- Style: Kyokushin Karate, Savate
- Team: Dojo Kamakura
- Rank: 9th dan Kyokushin Karate; 4th dan Kyokushin Karate (NKA); 7th dan Sei Budo Kai; 2nd dan Full-Contact Karate (USA); 3rd Silver glove in Savate (Boxe Francaise); 4th dan Oyama Karate

Mixed martial arts record
- Total: 4
- Wins: 2
- By knockout: 2
- Losses: 2
- By submission: 2

Other information
- Mixed martial arts record from Sherdog
- Last updated on: 27 November 2016

Gerard Gordeau (born 30 March 1956) is a Dutch former Savateur, Karateka, Kickboxer, and mixed martial artist. He is the 1991 World Champion Savate and holder of the Dutch Champion Karate title for eight consecutive years, but foremost known internationally for his fight against Teila Tuli in the first televised Ultimate Fighting Championship bout on 12 November 1993.

== Early life ==
The second of six brothers, Gordeau lost his father when he was 11 and was forced to leave school in order to work for an income. He took up Karate at 16 by influence of an Indonesian friend at whose house Gordeau used to eat. Initially seeing it as just a hobby, Gordeau decided to train seriously after challenging and losing twice to an unassuming Japanese partner. After a year of training in several dojos, he sparred again with him and this time Gordeau won. Thanks to those skills, he held jobs as a bouncer for eight years. Due to the high criminality of the Dutch districts, he would reveal years later that he lived through constant danger of death.

== Mixed martial arts career ==
Gordeau competed at the World Open Karate Championships. Later in his life, following the ideas of Kyokushin founder Mas Oyama, he trained in Wrestling and Boxing in an attempt to make his style more complete. He also learned Sambo, Pentjak Silat, Muay Thai, Savate and Judo. Gordeau was a Dutch Karate Champion from 1978 to 1985, a European Savate Champion from 1988 to 1991 and a World Savate Champion in 1992, with an overall competitive record of 27-4 before his MMA debut. Gordeau also had some shoot-style wrestling matches under his belt, a Japanese professional wrestling style resembling proto-MMA, having previously had matches at shootwrestling organizations UWF and RINGS, both in Japan. In August 13, 1988, Gordeau fought Akira Maeda at the UWF Newborn event in Tokyo, Japan. The bout was billed as a wrestler vs. kickboxer match, with Gordeau ultimately losing by submission in the fourth round.

=== Ultimate Fighting Championship ===
In 1993, Gordeau was scouted to take part in UFC 1, the first event of Ultimate Fighting Championship. The event's organizers had sought several high-level fighters in Holland, among them Kickboxing champion Ernesto Hoost, but Gordeau was the only one available and willing to do it. As he had been a Savate champion the previous year, he was billed solely as a Savate artist. According to him, he was initially pitted against Royce Gracie in the first round of the tournament, but when the organizers found out that Gordeau had previously competed in Fighting Network Rings, they changed the matchup: Gracie would fight Boxer Art Jimmerson instead, while Gordeau would face 400 pound Sumo expert Teila Tuli on the opposite side of the bracket.

In his first bout, also the first televised match in the history of UFC, Gordeau defeated Tuli in a fight that lasted only 26 seconds. When Tuli charged towards him with a tsukidashi attack, Gordeau eluded his opponent and allowed the sumo to crash against the cage wall. The Dutchman then took stance and threw a right roundhouse kick to Tuli's face, following with a right uppercut that cut Tuli's eye, before the referee intervened to stop the match.

Victorious, Gordeau advanced to the next round, although the bout left him injured, as the kick had knocked out three of Tuli's teeth and two of them had been stuck in Gordeau's foot. The announcers claimed that the third tooth landed underneath their table, although other reports say it landed on the crowd. Doctors attended him but, not wanting Gordeau to have an open wound, and having determined that it would get infected if they tried to extract the teeth, they simply taped his foot. Gordeau's punch had broken his hand as well, and he came to the next fight with a noticeably swollen fist.

In an unrelated matter, Gordeau's debut caused a minor controversy because he appeared to do a Roman salute before the match, gaining him accusations of being a neo-nazi, but it was explained that he was actually doing the traditional savate salute. In fact, Gordeau had a Jewish ethnic background through his father, a Jewish man from France. His grandfather was also shot at the Amersfoort concentration camp for being part of the Dutch resistance.

His next fight was against Kickboxing champion Kevin Rosier, who outweighed Gordeau again by almost 100 pounds and was in slightly better health. Still, Gordeau dominated the fight easily, driving Rosier against the fence with multiple leg kicks and jabs while keeping distance. After half a minute of harassment, Gordeau pushed Rosier down to the mat with knee and elbow strikes to the head, forcing him to cover down shielding his face, and then finished him with a stomp to the liver.

Finally, the Dutchman faced Brazilian Jiu-Jitsu stylist Royce Gracie in the championship bout. During the fight, Royce attempted a double leg takedown followed by a kosoto gake, but Gordeau blocked them and clamped to the cage wall to avoid being taken down. However, Gracie eventually repeated the throw and floored the Dutchman. According to Gordeau, Royce had been warned by the UFC doctors about his injuries and took advantage of this to overpower him. While Gordeau was under Gracie's mount, he allegedly bit Gracie's ear in an intentional foul, but Gracie, after landing some palm strikes and headbutts, still managed to submit Gordeau with a rear naked choke to win the fight and the tournament. The Brazilian also held the choke for a long time after Gerard's tap out in retaliation for the foul play.

Gordeau later justified his illegal attack as, "If you go down, you might as well give him something to remember you by," but he also commended Gracie as the better fighter. In 2012, Royce would visit Gordeau's dojo in The Hague to train, about which the Dutch fighter stated: "It was the first time after 20 years that we spoke. No hard feelings!"

In 1994, Gordeau was approached to fight again in UFC 2, but he refused due to disagreements over his payment after the previous event. He instead arranged for his training partners Remco Pardoel and Freek Hamaker to take his place, with him as a cornerman.

=== Vale Tudo Japan ===
Two years after his UFC stint, Gordeau applied to the Japanese Vale Tudo Japan tournament. He had been in the previous edition as a cornerman, helping to train fellow UFC competitor Dave Levicki for his unsuccessful match against Royce's brother Rickson.

Gordeau was pitted against the much lighter Shoot Wrestling exponent Yuki Nakai. Taking advantage of the ring they were fighting in, Gordeau grabbed the ropes to avoid takedowns and scored several strikes on Nakai through the first two rounds, including several illegal eye gouges when Nakai was down from a heel hook attempt. However, after a third round passed again on the ropes, Nakai scored a double leg takedown against the ring corner, escaped from a guillotine choke attempt by Gordeau, and dropped down for another heel hook, this time managing to submit the Dutchman after half an hour of fighting. Refusing to seek medical attention in order to continue in the tournament, Nakai lost the sight in his right eye from the gouge.

As with his fouls in UFC, Gordeau was unapologetic of his action, stating that he would do it again if he rematched Nakai. These claims attracted a great deal of criticism. In 2019, however, Gordeau revealed that he and Nakai had privately talked about it, and that Nakai had accepted his apologies and no longer harbored any ill feelings. Gordeau also praised Nakai's fighting spirit during the bout.

=== Post-retirement ===
In 2000, Gordeau served as a consultant for women's MMA promotion ReMix, where he also cornered Marloes Coenen.

Gordeau, along with his brothers Al and Nico, owns the Dojo Kamakura in The Hague. He also trained Dutch K-1 fighter Mourad Bouzidi, along with Anil Dubar, and sometimes the Romanian champion Daniel Ghiță. Famous students are Cem Senol of the Dojo Osaka Netherlands, and Robert Pepels of the Ashigaru Honbu Dojo Netherlands and founder of the Ashigaru Ryu style. Gordeau runs an International Karate Organization together with Pepels, and teaches at camps and seminars worldwide.

== Professional wrestling career ==
=== UWF Newborn and RINGS (1988–1992) ===
Gordeau had his debut in professional wrestling on 13 August 1988 in shoot style promotion UWF Newborn, losing a special match against Akira Maeda. He also competed in two bouts against Masaaki Satake and Mitsuya Nagai at "free fight" events held under RINGS.

=== New Japan Pro-Wrestling (1995–1999) ===
In 1995, he took part in New Japan Pro-Wrestling's four-man Final Countdown BVD Tournament on January 4 at the Tokyo Dome during Battle 7. He lost his only match to eventual winner Antonio Inoki. Gordeau remained with Inoki as a trainer and wrestler for the Universal Fighting-Arts Organization, cornering Naoya Ogawa in several occasions.

He took part in the infamous 1.4 Incident, which occurred on 4 January 1999 at the Tokyo Dome, where UFO member Naoya Ogawa faced Shinya Hashimoto in a pro wrestling match. Gordeau was in Ogawa's corner along with Kazunari Murakami and Tiger Mask, and when Naoya turned the bout into a shoot by brutally striking Hashimoto, who had no idea what was going on, Gerard and his colleagues had to protect Ogawa from the NJPW crew in the subsequent brawl. Gordeau later criticized Ogawa's action.

=== Pro Wrestling Zero-One (2001–2002, 2005, 2010) ===
Through 2001 and 2002, Gordeau participated in various Pro Wrestling Zero1 events, wrestling in singles matches against names like Shinya Hashimoto, Masato Tanaka, Samoa Joe and Steve Corino. On September 11, 2005, he lost to Enson Inoue at Big Mouth Loud in Tokyo. He returned to the promotion on April 11, 2010 at Zero1's Yasukuni Shrine Festival, where he teamed up with his former student Ryoji Sai to defeat Munenori Sawa and Akebono.

== Championships and accomplishments ==
- Eight time Dutch Champion Kyokushin Karate
- Competed at the World Championships Kyokushin Karate (1979, 1983, 1987)
- Savate World Heavyweight Champion (1991)
- Three time Savate European Heavyweight Champion

=== Mixed martial arts ===
- Ultimate Fighting Championship
  - UFC 1 Tournament Runner Up (1993)
  - UFC Encyclopedia Awards
    - Knockout of the Night (One time) vs. Teila Tuli

== Mixed martial arts record ==
Professional record breakdown
4 matches	2 wins	2 losses
By knockout	2	0
By submission	0	2

Res.	Record	Opponent	Method	Event	Date	Round	Time	Location	Notes
Loss	2–2	Yuki Nakai	Submission (heel hook)	Vale Tudo Japan 1995	20 April 1995	4	2:41	Tokyo, Japan	
Loss	2–1	Royce Gracie	Submission (rear-naked choke)	UFC 1	12 November 1993	1	1:44	Denver, Colorado, United States	UFC 1 Tournament Final.
Win	2–0	Kevin Rosier	TKO (corner stoppage)	UFC 1	12 November 1993	1	0:59	Denver, Colorado, United States	UFC 1 Tournament Semifinal.
Win	1–0	Teila Tuli	TKO (head kick)	UFC 1	12 November 1993	1	0:26	Denver, Colorado, United States	UFC 1 Tournament Quarterfinal. First televised fight in UFC history.

== Kickboxing record (incomplete) ==
Res.	Record	Opponent	Method	Event	Date	Round	Time	Location	Notes
Loss	27–6	(Japan) Toshiyuki Atokawa	Decision	K-1 Illusion 1993 Karate World Cup	2 October 1993	N/A	N/A	Osaka, Japan	
Loss	27–5	(Australia) Adam Watt	KO (right back blow)	K-1 Illusion	4 September 1993	2	2:07	Tokyo, Japan	
Win	27–4	(Socialist Federal Republic of Yugoslavia) Jokovic	TKO	Savate World Championship	25 May 1991	3	0:01	Paris, France	For Savate World Heavyweight Championship
Win	26–4	(France) Simon Bienvenu	KO	Savate World Championship	27 April 1991	N/A	N/A	Toulouse, France	

== Karate record ==
Karate record
Date	Result	Opponent	Event	Location	Method	Round	Time	Record
1991-10-10	Win	(Japan) Masaaki Satake	Karate World Cup '91 - All Japan Karate Championship		Decision (Divided)	3		
Legend: Win Loss Draw/No contest Notes
