= Zane Frazier =

American karateka, kickboxer and MMA fighter

- Born: July 16, 1966 (age 60); Los Angeles, California, United States
- Other names: Nasty
- Height: 6 ft 6 in (2.0 m)
- Weight: 230 lb (100 kg; 16 st)
- Division: Heavyweight
- Style: Kenpo Karate, Boxing, Wrestling, Judo, Kickboxing, Shootfighting, Brazilian Jiu-Jitsu
- Stance: Orthodox
- Fighting out of: North Hollywood, California, United States
- Team: Inosanto Academy; Borodin's Gym
- Rank: 4th Dan Black Belt in Kempo Karate
- Years active: 1984–2010

Kickboxing record
- Total: 19
- Wins: 17
- Losses: 2
- By knockout: 1

Mixed martial arts record
- Total: 15
- Wins: 4
- By knockout: 3
- By decision: 1
- Losses: 11
- By knockout: 9
- By submission: 2

Other information
- Mixed martial arts record from Sherdog

Zane Troy Frazier (born July 16, 1966) is an American former karateka, kickboxer and mixed martial artist who competed in the heavyweight division. After a successful career in karate during the 1980s in which he won numerous international accolades, Frazier then turned his hand to kickboxing and became a United States and North American Champion. After taking part at the inaugural Ultimate Fighting Championship event in 1993, he would continue his career in MMA until officially retiring in 2010.

== Early life ==
The son of Floyd and Bertha Frazier, he grew up in a Crips infested neighborhood in Los Angeles, California, and began training in martial arts in 1972 after seeing the film Fist of Fury.

Frazier graduated from Fairfax High School in 1980, and was recruited to play college basketball at the University of Idaho in Moscow under head coach Don Monson. He saw action as a true freshman in 1980–81, redshirted in 1981–82, and finished his bachelor's degree in 1986. In addition to his martial arts career, he later tried out for the New Jersey Jets.

Although his birth year is often given as 1966, this is age fabrication; he is four to five years older (1961 or 1962).

== Career ==
Frazier attained the rank of fourth degree black belt in American Kenpo karate and was the winner of the California, United States and North American karate championships in 1984 before becoming the international karate champion in 1987 and again in 1990. After making the transition to kickboxing, he won the World Kickboxing Federation (WKF) United States super heavyweight title in 1993.

On November 12, 1993, Frazier competed at UFC 1, a no-holds-barred fighting tournament and the very first mixed martial arts event held by the Ultimate Fighting Championship. He reportedly earned his place in the tournament by beating up Frank Dux in a street fight which was witnessed by UFC founders Rorion Gracie and Art Davie. Gracie and Davie had come to Los Angeles to scout the U.S. karate championships for potential fighters but saw Frazier and Dux's brawl beforehand. Frazier claims that he had been teaching classes for Dux and that Dux hadn't paid him; Dux disputes that account and says that Frazier sucker punched him while wearing brass knuckles.

In the UFC 1 tournament quarterfinals, Frazier faced fellow kickboxer Kevin Rosier. The match lasted 4 minutes and 20 seconds, ending with Rosier clubbing Frazier to the floor with a series of blows to the back of the head, then stomping on him before Frazier's corner threw in the towel. Frazier suffered respiratory failure and was rushed to hospital after the bout.

He returned to kickboxing the following year to win the WKF North American Super Heavyweight Championship but took his second MMA bout in September 1995 when he fought at Shooto: Vale Tudo Perception in Tokyo, Japan, knocking out Kendo Nagasaki thirty-six seconds into the fight. Having amassed a 17–0 kickboxing record in the United States, Frazier made his K-1 debut at K-1 Hercules in Nagoya, Japan on December 9, 1995, against Takeru and suffered his first defeat at the hands of the Seido karate stylist as he succumbed to a barrage of knees and punches in round two.

Frazier then made his way back to the UFC in May 1996 at UFC 9 and was defeated via technical knockout by Cal Worsham three minutes into the fight. In his second and last outing in K-1, he went up against Nobuaki Kakuda at K-1 Revenge '96 in Osaka, Japan on September 1, 1996. Despite having a massive size advantage, Frazier was knocked down with a low kick in round four and lost by unanimous decision.

Following this, Frazier continued his career in MMA and in his next fight against Sidney "Mestre Hulk" Gonçalves Freitas in Brazil, he was knocked out after falling from the ring and hitting his head on the floor. After this, he continued to fight throughout the 1990s and 2000s and recorded mostly losses. His final fight came in January 2008 and he was knocked out by Richard Blake.

== Championships and awards ==
=== Karate ===
- California Karate Championships
  - California Karate Championship (1991)
  - California Karate Championship (1992)
- International Karate Championships
  - International Karate Championship (1987)
  - International Karate Championship (1990)
- North American Karate Championships
  - North American Heavyweight Karate Championship (1984)
- North Western Karate Championships
  - North Western Karate Championship (1984)
- USA Karate Championships
  - USA Heavyweight Karate Championship (1984)

=== Kickboxing ===
- World Kickboxing Federation
  - WKF United States Super Heavyweight Championship
  - WKF North American Super Heavyweight Championship

=== Mixed martial arts ===
- Worldwide Fighting Championship
  - WFC Heavyweight Championship

== Kickboxing record ==
Kickboxing record
17 wins (? KOs), 2 losses, 0 draws
Date	Result	Opponent	Event	Location	Method	Round	Time	Record
1996-09-01	Loss	(Japan) Nobuaki Kakuda	K-1 Revenge '96	Osaka, Japan	Decision (unanimous)	5	3:00	17–2
1995-12-09	Loss	(Japan) Takeru	K-1 Hercules	Nagoya, Japan	KO (right hook)	2	0:45	17–1
Legend: Win Loss Draw/No contest Notes

== Mixed martial arts record ==
Professional record breakdown
15 matches	4 wins	11 losses
By knockout	3	9
By submission	0	2
By decision	1	0

Res.	Record	Opponent	Method	Event	Date	Round	Time	Location	Notes
Loss	4–11	Richard Blake	KO (punches)	NoLimit Fighting: Heavy Hands	January 26, 2008	1	1:56	Dallas, Texas, United States	
Win	4–10	Melville Calabaca	TKO (punches)	WFC: Fight Club	November 5, 2005	1	0:43	Loveland, Colorado, United States	Wins the WFC Heavyweight Championship.
Win	3–10	Ron Rumpf	KO (punches)	WFC: Clash of the Titans	September 24, 2005	1	1:15	Denver, Colorado, United States	
Loss	2–10	Aaron Brink	TKO (punches)	WEC 3	June 7, 2002	1	1:00	Lemoore, California, United States	
Loss	2–9	Mark Smith	TKO (punches)	Ultimate Pankration 1	November 11, 2001	1	1:33	Cabazon, California, United States	
Win	2–8	Giant Ochiai	Decision (unanimous)	KOTC 10: Critical Mass	August 4, 2001	1	7:00	California, United States	
Loss	1–8	Bobby Hoffman	Submission (armbar)	RINGS USA: Battle of Champions	March 17, 2001	1	1:34	Council Bluffs, Iowa, United States	
Loss	1–7	Jason Godsey	Submission (rear-naked choke)	Extreme Challenge 23	April 2, 1999	1	0:45	Indianapolis, Indiana, United States	
Loss	1–6	Dick Vrij	KO (punch)	RINGS Holland: Judgement Day	February 7, 1999	1	2:34	Amsterdam, Netherlands	
Loss	1–5	Vasily Kudin	TKO (submission to punches)	1st Absolute Fighting World Cup Pankration	November 12, 1997	1	6:31	Tel Aviv, Israel	
Loss	1–4	Wes Gassaway	TKO (submission to punches)	IFC 4: Akwesasane	March 28, 1997	1	2:26	Hogansburg, New York, United States	
Loss	1–3	Mestre Hulk	KO (fall from ring)	World Vale Tudo Championship 3	January 19, 1997	1	2:00	Brazil	
Loss	1–2	Cal Worsham	TKO (punches)	UFC 9	May 17, 1996	1	3:14	Detroit, Michigan, United States	
Win	1–1	Kendo Nagasaki	KO (punch)	Shooto: Vale Tudo Perception	September 26, 1995	1	0:36	Tokyo, Japan	
Loss	0–1	Kevin Rosier	TKO (corner stoppage)	UFC 1	November 12, 1993	1	4:20	Denver, Colorado, United States	UFC 1 tournament quarter-final.
