= Royce Gracie =

Brazilian mixed martial artist (born 1966)

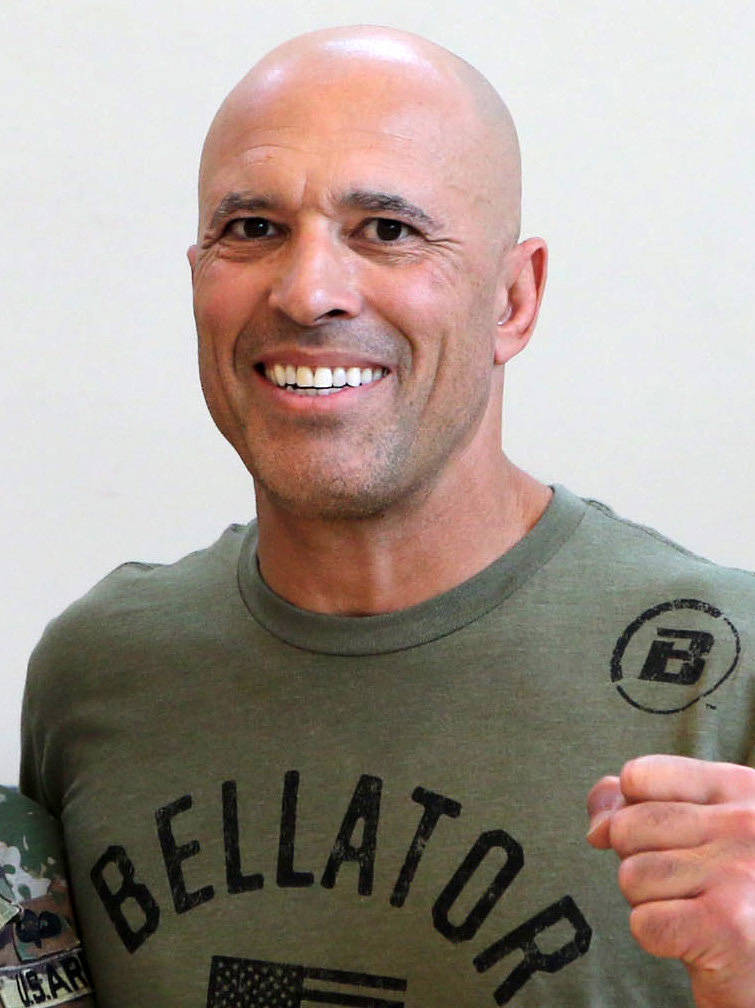
- Gracie in 2018
- Born: 12 December 1966 (age 59); Rio de Janeiro, Brazil
- Height: 6 ft 0 in (183 cm)
- Weight: 176 lb (80 kg; 12 st 8 lb)
- Division: Middleweight; Light heavyweight Openweight
- Reach: 194 cm (76 in)
- Style: Gracie jiu-jitsu
- Stance: Southpaw
- Fighting out of: Torrance, California, U.S.
- Team: Gracie Humaitá; Team Royce Gracie
- Teacher: Hélio Gracie
- Rank: 7th deg. BJJ coral belt (under Rickson Gracie)
- Years active: 1993–1995, 2000–2007, 2016 (MMA); 1998 (Submission grappling)

Mixed martial arts record
- Total: 20
- Wins: 15
- By knockout: 2
- By submission: 11
- By decision: 2
- Losses: 2
- By knockout: 2
- Draws: 3

Other information
- Notable relatives: Gracie family
- Website: roycegracie.com
- Mixed martial arts record from Sherdog

Royce Gracie (Portuguese: [ˈʁɔjsi ˈɡɾejsi]; born 12 December 1966) is a Brazilian former professional mixed martial artist. Gracie gained fame for his success in the Ultimate Fighting Championship (UFC). He is a member of the Gracie jiu-jitsu family, a UFC Hall of Famer, and is considered to be one of the most influential figures in the history of mixed martial arts (MMA). He also competed in PRIDE Fighting Championships, K-1's Dynamite!! series, and Bellator.

In 1993 and 1994, Gracie was the tournament winner of UFC 1, UFC 2 and UFC 4, which were openweight single-elimination tournaments with minimal rules. He used his skills in submission grappling to defeat larger and heavier opponents. He was also known for his rivalry with Ken Shamrock, whom he beat in UFC 1 and then fought to a draw in the rematch for the Superfight Championship at UFC 5. Royce later competed in PRIDE Fighting Championships, where he is most remembered for his 90-minute bout against catch wrestler Kazushi Sakuraba in 2000, and a controversial "judo vs jiu-jitsu" special-rules match against Hidehiko Yoshida, an Olympic gold medalist in judo, at PRIDE Shockwave in 2002.

Royce Gracie's success in the UFC popularized Gracie jiu-jitsu (commonly referred to as "Brazilian" jiu-jitsu) and revolutionized mixed martial arts, contributing to the movement towards grappling and ground fighting. For his pioneering in mixed martial arts, Gracie was the first inductee to the UFC Hall of Fame in 2003 alongside his once-rival Ken Shamrock. He was inducted into the Martial Arts History Museum Hall of Fame in 2007, and later into the International Sports Hall of Fame in 2016.

== Early life ==
Royce Gracie was born in Rio de Janeiro, Brazil, on 12 December 1966. One of the nine children of jiu-jitsu grandmaster Hélio Gracie, he learned the martial art from his father in his childhood. He had his first competition at age 8 and started teaching classes when he was 14 years old. When he was 17, Royce was awarded a black belt by his father, Hélio. A few months later, after he turned 18, he and his brothers Royler and Rickson Gracie moved to Torrance, California, to live with their older brother Rorion Gracie, who had moved there in 1978 and had established Gracie Academy. He is of Scottish and Brazilian ancestry.

The Gracie brothers in the United States continued the family's tradition of the "Gracie Challenge", in which they challenged other martial artists to no-rules full-contact matches in their gym to prove the superiority of Gracie jiu-jitsu. Rorion would later edit footage from the Gracie Challenge fights into a single documentary series known as Gracie in Action, with some footage featuring Royce's fights. The Gracie in Action tapes inspired Art Davie to create the UFC.

== Mixed martial arts career ==
=== Ultimate Fighting Championship (UFC) ===
==== UFC 1 ====
The Ultimate Fighting Championship was founded in 1993 by Rorion Gracie, business executive Art Davie, and the Semaphore Entertainment Group (SEG). The premise of the event was doing an eight-man openweight single-elimination tournament, with minimal rules, from fighters representing different martial arts, to find the most effective and strongest fighting style. While Davie and the SEG were interested in doing an event with violent and exciting vale tudo fights similar to what they had seen on the Gracie in Action tapes, Rorion was interested in promoting his family's own jiu-jitsu style by defeating larger and stronger opponents from more well-known martial arts. Rorion said he picked Royce to represent the family's art because of his skinnier and smaller frame, to show how a small person can defeat a bigger opponent using jiu-jitsu.

Gracie entered the tournament wearing his now iconic Brazilian jiu-jitsu gi. In his first match, Gracie defeated journeyman boxer Art Jimmerson. He tackled him to the ground using a baiana (morote-gari or double-leg) and obtained the dominant "mounted" position. Mounted and with only one free arm, Jimmerson conceded defeat.

In the semi-finals, Gracie fought against shootfighter and King of Pancrase fighter Ken Shamrock. This was Royce's most difficult match, as Shamrock had grappling experience (having caught Patrick Smith in a Heel Hook in a previous match). Gracie started the round by attempting a double-leg, which was defended by Shamrock with a sprawl, and Shamrock attempted to stand up back to his feet. Gracie then responded by pulling Shamrock to his guard and started to do small kicks into Shamrock's kidneys, but he got out from his guard and attempted to pull Gracie into a heel hook, as he had done with Patrick Smith similarly before. The Brazilian defended by wrapping his gi around Shamrock's arm, and when the latter sat back, it pulled Gracie on top of him. He then proceeded to take Shamrock's back and used his own gi to secure a rear naked choke. Shamrock later stated it was a gi choke, using the cloth around his neck. Shamrock tapped out to Gracie's choke, but the referee did not see the tap and ordered both fighters to continue the match. Shamrock then admitted defeat to the referee, saying it would not be fair, and Royce was declared the bout's victor, with both fighters exchanging a handshake after some taunting.

Gracie fought in the finals against karate Kyokushin practitioner and savate world champion Gerard Gordeau. Gracie managed to take his opponent to the ground and secure a rear choke, winning the bout. During the fight, Gordeau bit Gracie's ear, breaking one of the few rules of the event. Gracie retaliated by holding the choke after Gordeau had tapped out, with the Dutchman tapping in panic before they were separated by the referee. Royce was then declared the "Ultimate Fighting Champion" and was awarded $50,000 in prize money.

==== Rivalry with Ken Shamrock ====
After Gracie defeated Ken Shamrock in the first UFC event, a rivalry developed between the fighters. Shamrock especially wanted a rematch as, according to him, Gracie had used the gi to favor his grappling while he had not been allowed to use wrestling shoes by the promoters, which he considered an unfair advantage to Gracie. Shamrock nonetheless conceded that he had underestimated his opponent.

A rematch between Royce Gracie and Ken Shamrock failed to materialize at the UFC 2, as Shamrock had broken his hand in training and at UFC 3 Gracie withdrew from the competition due to exhaustion (resulting in Shamrock withdrawing from the event too). To solve the problem of the tournament format's unpredictability, a "superfight" in which Gracie and Ken Shamrock would fight in a bout outside the main tournament was scheduled for the UFC 5.

==== UFC 2 ====
Gracie returned to defend his title four months later at UFC 2, this tournament would have sixteen fighters and he would have to defeat four opponents to become the champion. Gracie began his defense of the title by submitting Japanese Karatedo Daido Juku and Kyokushin karateka Minoki Ichihara after a five-minute bout, his longest yet, with a lapel choke (which was possible as Ichihara was wearing a Karategi). Advancing into the quarterfinals, Royce Gracie fought Five Animals Kung Fu practitioner and future Pancrase veteran Jason DeLucia, whom he had already fought and defeated before in one of the "Gracie Challenges" in 1991. Gracie submitted DeLucia via armbar just over a minute into the bout. Gracie then submitted 250-lb Judo and Taekwondo black belt Remco Pardoel with a lapel choke (as Pardoel was wearing a Judogi), and arrived at the finals against kickboxer Patrick Smith, who had previously participated at UFC 1. Showing his superior grappling skills, Gracie easily took Smith to the ground and won the fight via submission to punches.

==== UFC 3 ====
Royce Gracie entered UFC 3 now as twice-champion and as the favorite to win. The number of fighters was scaled down back to eight like the first edition. Royce was matched up in the first round against Kimo Leopoldo, a representative of Taekwondo and former high school wrestler. Leopoldo used his wrestling background to dominate the grappling exchanges, denying several of Gracie's takedowns and even took his back. As both men began to tire, Gracie held down Leopoldo by grabbing onto his pony tail, eventually submitting him with an armbar at 4:40 of round one. However, he withdrew from his next fight with Harold Howard before it began due to exhaustion and dehydration. Royce entered the ring and threw in the towel. This was the first event which Gracie did not win.

==== UFC 4 ====
Gracie began UFC 4 by submitting 51-year-old Karateka and Kung Fu film actor Ron van Clief in the opening round with a rear-naked choke near the four-minute mark. In the semi-finals, he fought American Kenpo Karate specialist Keith Hackney, who was able to defend Gracie's takedowns for four minutes until he was submitted by an armbar.

Gracie's final tournament bout was against Dan Severn, a former Pan American freestyle wrestling gold medalist. Severn dominated the fight, securing takedowns and maintaining top control throwing ground and pound for nearly fifteen minutes. However Gracie eventually managed to secure a triangle choke for the submission victory at 15:49 of round one. The match extended beyond the pay-per-view time slot and viewers, who missed the end of the fight, demanded their money back.

==== UFC 5 ====
Gracie and Shamrock returned for UFC 5, they were both set to headline the UFC's first "superfight", a special outside the main tournament to rematch Gracie and Shamrock, as they would have no prior damage from a previous fight. The winner would win a special belt and become the inaugural UFC Superfight Champion. Time limits were re-introduced into the sport in 1995 due pay-per-view limits after the UFC 4 debacle and the fighters were only told a few hours before the event, upsetting both competitors.

At the start of round one, Shamrock immediately scored a takedown with Gracie pulling guard. The majority of the contest consisted of Shamrock in top position defending Gracie's submission game, occasionally landing ground and pound. After nearly thirty minutes of control time for Shamrock, the contest was given overtime and restarted on the feet. At the beginning of the overtime, Shamrock connected with a punch that led to swelling on Gracie's eye, with Gracie immediately pulling guard. After another uneventful few minutes, the contest was declared a draw.

The draw sparked much debate and controversy as to who would have won the fight had judges determined the outcome, or had there been no time limits, as by the end of the fight Gracie's right eye was swollen shut. Had there been ringside judges, UFC matchmaker Art Davie believes that Shamrock would have been declared the winner. The fight was poorly received by critics and the live audience, due to the lack of action from both competitors.

After the fight, Gracie left the UFC along with his brother Rorion, who sold his shares of the event. According to Rorion, they left the organization due to a conflict of interest because of the time limits introduced after UFC 4 and future plans to introduce judges, and weight classes.

==== Royce's challenge letters ====
Throughout his UFC days, Royce frequently challenged well-known fighters—though usually to no avail—to "fight to the finish, any place and any time." Many big-name sportspeople, including Mike Tyson (who was serving a prison term at the time) received a note several times in an open letter fashion, usually published by Black Belt Magazine in The Ultimate Fighter column.

==== UFC Hall of Fame ====
At UFC 45 in November 2003, at the ten-year anniversary of the UFC, Shamrock and Gracie became the first inductees into the UFC Hall of Fame. UFC President Dana White said;

We feel that no two individuals are more deserving than Royce and Ken to be the charter members. Their contributions to our sport, both inside and outside the Octagon, may never be equaled.

=== PRIDE Fighting Championships ===
==== Attempts to sign Royce ====
Gracie was originally going to debut in PRIDE Fighting Championships in their 1998 PRIDE 2 event, where he would be pitted against fellow UFC champion Mark Kerr. The Gracie side demanded special rules without time limit or referee stoppage, which were accepted. However, Royce pulled out due to a back injury after the fight had been advertised.

The situation changed after PRIDE 8, when Royce's older brother Royler Gracie was defeated by Kazushi Sakuraba. Sakuraba dominated the match and won by technical submission, as Royler was caught in a Kimura lock and refused to tap out, the referee stopped the match before his arm could be broken. This was the first time in 50 years a Gracie had been defeated in a mixed martial arts fight and Sakuraba followed by a challenge to Rickson Gracie. In response, the Gracies argued that Royler's loss did not count as he had not conceded or tapped out, and the referee's stopping of the bout went against the special ruleset they had requested for the fight. Many pundits were also affirming that the Gracie pure-BJJ approach was not able to match a well-rounded cross-trained fighter anymore. In response to that assertion, and to defeat Sakuraba in a rematch, the Gracies signed Royce up to PRIDE.

==== PRIDE Grand Prix and bout against Nobuhiko Takada ====
Royce Gracie's first event in PRIDE was in the "PRIDE Grand Prix 2000", an openweight tournament that would be divided into two events: the Opening Round, which consisted of the Round of 16 and the Finals which would happen three months later and consisted of the quarter-finals, Semi-finals and Finals. The bouts in the Opening Round had their rules modified to have only one round of fifteen minutes. In the first round, he fought Japanese professional wrestler Nobuhiko Takada. Takada was a very popular wrestler who had headlined PRIDE 1 and PRIDE 4 against Royce's brother Rickson. Takada was also the former mentor of Sakuraba, the family's rival.

In the first minute of the bout Gracie pulled Takada into his guard, and he spent the rest of the match unsuccessfully trying to submit or sweep Takada. After a largely uneventful fight, Royce Gracie was declared the winner by unanimous decision and advanced to the Grand Prix Quarter-Finals.

==== Bout with Sakuraba ====
Royce was then set to fight Kazushi Sakuraba in the quarter-finals at the PRIDE Grand Prix 2000 Finals. Sakuraba was a professional wrestler who derived his foundation in submission grappling from catch wrestling and shoot-style wrestling. He had defeated several opponents and become one of the first Japanese stars of PRIDE. As Royce entered the Grand Prix specially to fight Sakuraba, the Gracies demanded special rules for the fight: an unlimited number of 15-minute rounds, no judges, no referee stoppages, and wins could only come by knockout, submission or throwing in the towel. Sakuraba criticized the different ruleset, the Gracie's demands to fight under it and their demands for special treatment, but ended up agreeing to the challenge nonetheless.

The two battled for an hour and a half, after which Gracie began to fatigue, and could no longer stand due to a broken femur as a result of numerous leg kicks. The towel was thrown in and Sakuraba was declared the winner. Sakuraba went on to defeat other members of the Gracie family, including Renzo Gracie and Ryan Gracie, earning him the nickname "Gracie Hunter."

==== Bouts with Yoshida ====
Gracie returned to PRIDE in 2002 to fight Japanese gold-medalist judoka Hidehiko Yoshida in a special "judo vs. Brazilian jiu-jitsu" special rules match, billed as a "rematch" of Masahiko Kimura vs. Hélio Gracie, which had happened 50 years earlier. The rules were that the fight would be contested in two 10-minute rounds and would be declared a draw if no result was achieved. Strikes to the head were disallowed, as it was any kind of strike if both opponents were on the ground. Lying on the mat or dropping down without touching the opponent would be banned as well. Both fighters would wear a keikogi as per their respective disciplines's preference. It happened at PRIDE Shockwave a co-production between PRIDE and K-1 kickboxing, intended to be a mega-event celebrating martial arts, with the event still having the largest live attendance in MMA history, drawing almost 91,000 fans (with some sources suggesting instead 71,000). Royce's father Hélio Gracie lit a ceremonial olympic torch along with MMA pioneer Antonio Inoki in the opening ceremony.

Royce started the fight pulling guard and attempting a heel hook and an armbar, with Hidehiko blocking them and coming back with a gi choke and an ankle lock attempt. Gracie pulled guard again, but Yoshida turned it into a daki age and sought the Kimura lock; then, when the Brazilian blocked the technique, Yoshida passed his guard and performed a mounted sode guruma jime. After a moment of inactivity, the referee Daisuke Noguchi stopped the match in the belief Royce was unconscious and gave victory to Yoshida.

Gracie immediately protested and footage of the fight was reviewed, which showed that Gracie's visible arm during the execution of the choke was limp and motionless. Gracie began to argue with Noguchi, the squabble soon resulted in him attacking the referee and it escalated into a full a brawl between the corners of the two fighters. Later backstage, the Gracies demanded it be turned into a no contest, and an immediate rematch be booked with different rules. If not, the Gracie family would never fight for PRIDE FC again. PRIDE, wanting to keep the Gracie family with them, accepted their demands.

Afterward, Gracie started fighting without a gi so that his opponents could not stall by holding onto it. The grudge match between Yoshida and Gracie took place at PRIDE's Shockwave 2003 event on December 31, 2003. Gracie dominated Yoshida but, as the match had no judge per Gracie's request, the bout was declared a draw after two 10-minute rounds.

=== Fighting and Entertainment Group ===
In September 2004 PRIDE had a disagreement with Gracie about his participation in the 2005 PRIDE Middleweight Grand Prix. Gracie had issues with the proposed opponents and rules (Grand Prix fights must have a winner and cannot end in a draw). He jumped to Fighting and Entertainment Group's K-1 organization. Pride sued Gracie for breaching his contract with them. The case was settled in December 2005, with Gracie issuing a public apology, blaming his actions on a misinterpretation of the contract by his manager.

In K-1, Royce Gracie competed on K-1's Dynamite!! series, which featured both kickboxing and MMA matches on their cards. On December 31, 2004, Gracie entered the K-1 scene at the K-1 PREMIUM 2004 Dynamite!! event inside the Osaka Dome, facing off against former sumo wrestler and MMA newcomer Akebono Tarō aka. Chad Rowan under special MMA rules (Two 10-minute rounds; the match would end as a draw if there was no winner after the two rounds). Gracie made quick work of his heavy opponent, forcing Akebono to submit to a shoulder lock at 2:13 of the first round.

Exactly one year later, on the K-1 PREMIUM 2005 Dynamite!! card of December 31, 2005, Gracie fought Japan's Hideo Tokoro, a 143-pound fighter, in a fight ending in a draw after 20 minutes. Gracie's original opponent was scheduled to be the tall Korean fighter Choi Hong-man, another MMA newcomer.

=== Return to UFC ===
On January 16, 2006, UFC President Dana White announced that Royce Gracie would return to the UFC to fight UFC welterweight champion Matt Hughes on May 27, 2006, at UFC 60. This was a non-title bout at a catchweight of 175 lb. under UFC/California State Athletic Commission rules. To prepare, Gracie trained in Muay Thai and was frequently shown in publicity materials from Fairtex.

In round one, Hughes secured a straight armbar that hyper-extended Royce's arm, however Royce refused to tap. Hughes eventually won the fight by TKO at 4:39 of the first round.

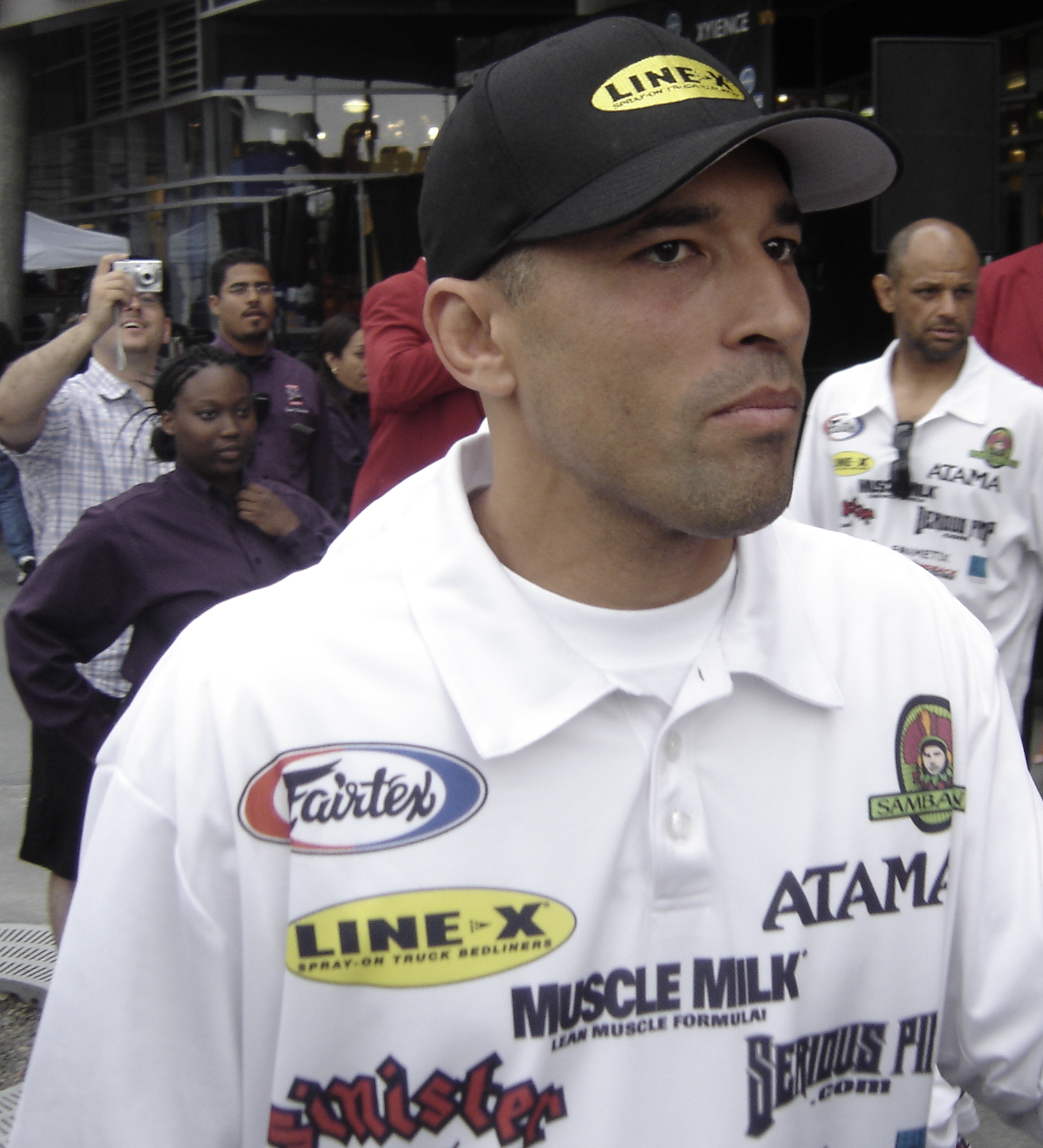
Royce Gracie in 2007

Royce said later after the fight with Hughes that he wanted a rematch and that he was not surprised by Hughes's performance: "No, we knew what he was planning to do. We worked out his gameplan before the fight, and he did exactly what we expected. I over-trained for the fight. That was all. I started training too much, too hard, for too long. He did exactly what we expected."

=== Rematch with Sakuraba ===
On May 8, 2007, EliteXC announced that Gracie's opponent for the June 2 Dynamite!! USA event in Los Angeles would be Japanese fighter Kazushi Sakuraba.

Gracie defeated Sakuraba by a unanimous decision. However, a post-fight drug screen revealed that Royce had traces of Nandrolone in his system. "Use of steroids is simply cheating," said Armando Garcia, California State Athletic Commission executive director. "It won't be tolerated in this state."

=== Steroids scandal ===
On June 14, 2007, the California State Athletic Commission declared that Gracie had tested positive for Nandrolone, an anabolic steroid, after his fight with Sakuraba. According to the California State Athletic Commission, the average person could produce about 2 ng/ml of Nandrolone, while an athlete following "rigorous physical exercise" could have a level of around 6 ng/ml. Both "A" and "B" test samples provided by Gracie "had a level of over 50 ng/ml and we were informed that the level itself was so elevated that it would not register on the laboratory's calibrator," said the CSAC. Gracie was fined $2,500 (the maximum penalty the commission can impose) and suspended for the remainder of his license, which ended on May 30, 2008. Gracie paid the fine.

Royce Gracie decided to dispute the allegations during an online video interview in May 2009, saying that his weight in the first UFC event was 178 lb and claiming his weight during his Sakuraba fight was 180 lb, thus only gaining 2 pounds. This was widely disputed by experts. According to ESPN, "In the former contest, he weighed in at 175 pounds; for Sakuraba, he was 188. One may not need to be nutritionist to observe that a muscle gain of 13 pounds in one year at the age of 40 is a strikingly accomplished feat. Athletes nearing the half-century mark are often happy to maintain functional mass, let alone pack it on".

=== Retirement ===
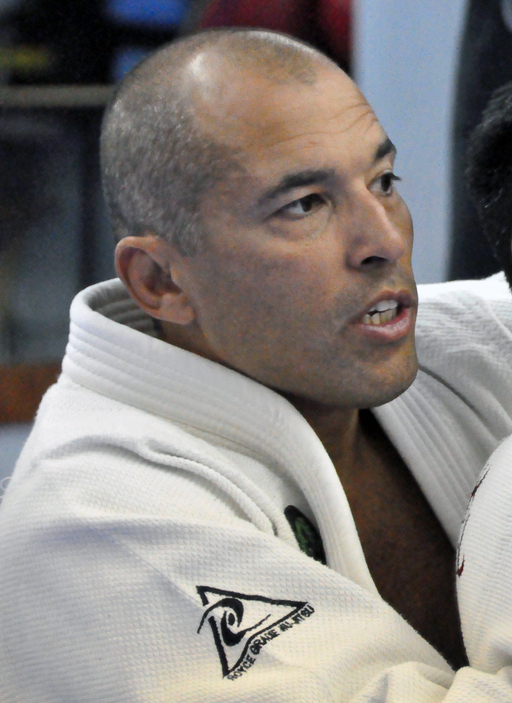
Gracie in 2010

On March 11, 2011, Royce Gracie's profile was added back to ufc.com active fighters list as a middleweight. His manager stated that they were actively negotiating with the UFC for a return to the Octagon and said it was just a matter of "getting it nailed down" and that there was plenty of time for it. On November 15, 2013, at UFC 167 on the 20th Anniversary of the UFC, Royce Gracie confirmed to MMA journalist Ariel Helwani that he had retired from competing in mixed martial arts.

=== Return with Bellator MMA ===
At Bellator 145, it was announced that Gracie would return from retirement to face rival Ken Shamrock in a trilogy fight, taking place on February 19, 2016, at Bellator 149. Gracie won the fight via TKO in round one. The win was not without controversy, however, as replays showed that Gracie landed a knee strike that grazed the groin of Shamrock prior to the finish. Shamrock protested the stoppage, however the bout was officially ruled a victory for Gracie. It was later announced that Shamrock had failed his pre-fight drug test for banned substances.

== Submission grappling career ==
On December 17, 1998, at Oscar de Jiu Jitsu, Royce Gracie competed in a grudge-match superfight against Wallid Ismail in front of several thousand spectators. Carlson Gracie was Ismail's coach, though Ismail originally was Carlson's fourth choice to face Royce after Mario Sperry, Murilo Bustamante and Amaury Bitetti. The match was contested without points and with no time-limit in place, with Ismail choking Gracie unconscious via clock choke in four minutes and fifty-three seconds.

== Post-fight career ==
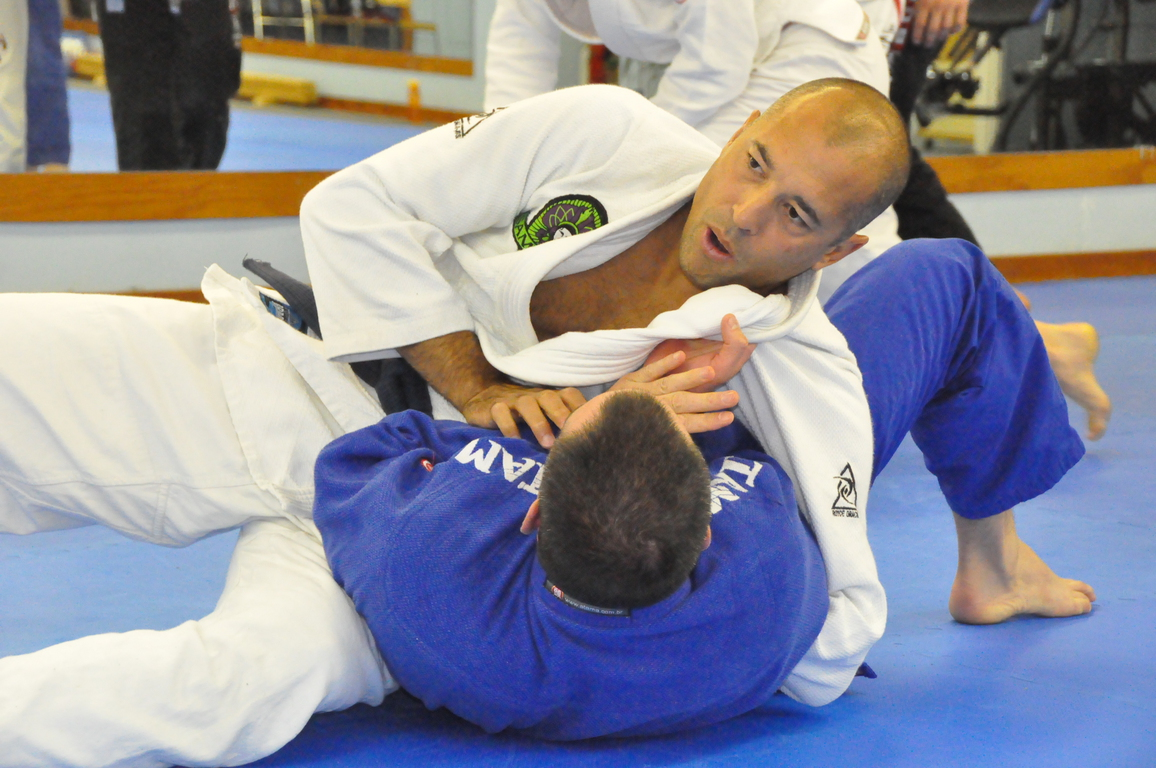
Royce Gracie demonstrates a Kesa-gatame in a seminar in 2011.

Gracie has been since retired from MMA competition and has been focusing in teaching jiu-jitsu. He mostly travels around the world going to schools, teaching in seminars and doing interviews in magazines, websites and talk shows. He has opened his own association of gyms known as "Royce Gracie Jiu-Jitsu Network", with affiliate schools in 34 locations in the United States, and many throughout the world in Brazil, Canada, Ecuador, Guatemala, Kuwait, United Arab Emirates, and the United Kingdom.

Royce Gracie's branch of jiu-jitsu focuses mainly on the self-defense parts of the martial art. Gracie has accused modern "sporting" jiu-jitsu of teaching techniques that are unpractical and unrealistic to use in a self-defense situation, and claims to be rescuing the true intent of Gracie Jiu-Jitsu as devised by his father Hélio Gracie.

== Personal life ==
Gracie filed for divorce in 2016. He and his former wife Marianne have three sons and a daughter. His son Kheydon Gracie enlisted in the US Army.

Despite being a 7th degree coral belt, Gracie wears a dark blue belt when training in Brazilian jiu-jitsu paying homage to his father, Hélio Gracie, who primarily wore a dark blue belt despite having the highest possible rank, red belt. Hélio Gracie died in 2009, and Royce said he does not want to be promoted by anybody else.

Gracie is an avid firearms shooter. In 2022, Gracie competed in and was on the winning team of the Sig Hunter Games as a member of team Warrior.

On July 6, 2023, it was announced that ESPN Films is producing a documentary series on the Gracie family directed by Chris Fuller and produced by Greg O'Connor and Guy Ritchie.

=== Conversion to Islam ===
Gracie identified as a Zionist and a supporter of Donald Trump and Jair Bolsonaro. until March 2024 when he abruptly announced his conversion to Islam and took his shahadah on camera in front of Sheikh Uthman Ibn Farooq and Imams Da’ee and Muhaddith. The event was facilitated by Eddie Redzovic, an ethnic Bosnian American Muslim YouTuber and fifth-degree BJJ black belt based in Chicago.

== Controversies and legal troubles ==
Gracie has engaged in multiple disputes with other martial artists including his nephews Rener Gracie, Ryron Gracie, and Eddie Bravo.

On April 1, 2015, the IRS sent Royce Gracie and his wife a Notice of Deficiency claiming they owe $657,114 in back taxes and $492,835.25 in penalties for Civil Fraud, based on IRC 6663(a). The case was settled on March 31, 2023, and Royce Gracie agreed to pay $461,611.80 to the US government.

== Instructor lineage ==
=== Brazilian jiu-jitsu ===
Kano Jigoro → Tomita Tsunejiro → Mitsuyo Maeda → Carlos Gracie → Hélio Gracie → Royce Gracie

== Championships and accomplishments ==
=== Mixed martial arts ===
- Ultimate Fighting Championship
  - UFC Hall of Fame (Inaugural inductee, Pioneer Wing, class of 2003)
  - UFC 1 Tournament Championship
  - UFC 2 Tournament Championship
  - UFC 4 Tournament Championship
  - UFC 3 Tournament semi-finalist (Note: Gracie withdrew from the tournament due to injury.)
  - UFC Viewer's Choice Award
  - UFC Encyclopedia Awards
    - Fight of the Night (Four times) vs. Ken Shamrock 1, Minoki Ichihara, Kimo Leopoldo and Dan Severn
    - Submission of the Night (Four times) vs. Gerard Gordeau, Remco Pardoel, Kimo Leopoldo and Dan Severn
  - First tournament champion in UFC history
  - Longest finish streak in UFC history (11)
  - Most bouts won in tournaments in UFC history (11)
  - Most tournaments won in UFC history (3)
  - Most fights in a single night in UFC history (4) (tied with Patrick Smith)
  - Longest fight in UFC history (36 minutes) - vs. Ken Shamrock 2 at UFC 5
  - Longest submission streak in UFC history (6)
  - Tied (Gilbert Burns) for most armbar submission wins in UFC history (4)
  - Second highest submission finish rate in UFC history (10 submissions / 11 wins - 90.91%)
  - Greatest Submission in UFC's first 25 Years - vs. Ken Shamrock 1
- PRIDE Fighting Championships
  - Longest fight in PRIDE history (90 minutes) - vs. Kazushi Sakuraba at PRIDE Grand Prix 2000 Finals
- Fight Matrix
  - Fighter of the Year (1993)
- Black Belt Magazine
  - Competitor of the Year (1994)
- Wrestling Observer Newsletter
  - Fight of the Year (2000) - vs. Kazushi Sakuraba on May 1
- World MMA Awards
  - 2013 Lifetime Achievement
- Beckett Media
  - Ranked #44 Greatest Athlete of All Time (2014)
- International Sports Hall of Fame
  - Class of 2016
- Martial Arts History Museum Hall of Fame
  - Class of 2007

== Mixed martial arts record ==
Professional record breakdown
20 matches	15 wins	2 losses
By knockout	2	2
By submission	11	0
By decision	2	0
Draws	3	

Res.	Record	Opponent	Method	Event	Date	Round	Time	Location	Notes
Win	15–2–3	Ken Shamrock	TKO (knee and punches)	Bellator 149	February 19, 2016	1	2:22	Houston, Texas, United States	Light heavyweight bout.
Win	14–2–3	Kazushi Sakuraba	Decision (unanimous)	Dynamite!! USA	June 2, 2007	3	5:00	Los Angeles, California, United States	Catchweight (188 lb) bout. Gracie tested positive for anabolic steroids after match. The judges' decision was not overturned.
Loss	13–2–3	Matt Hughes	TKO (punches)	UFC 60	May 27, 2006	1	4:39	Los Angeles, California, United States	Catchweight (175 lb) bout.
Draw	13–1–3	Hideo Tokoro	Draw	K-1 PREMIUM 2005 Dynamite!!	December 31, 2005	2	10:00	Osaka, Japan	Rules modified for no judges' decision.
Win	13–1–2	Akebono Taro	Submission (omoplata)	K-1 PREMIUM 2004 Dynamite!!	December 31, 2004	1	2:13	Osaka, Japan	
Draw	12–1–2	Hidehiko Yoshida	Draw (time limit)	PRIDE Shockwave 2003	December 31, 2003	2	10:00	Saitama, Japan	Rules modified for no referee stoppages and no judges' decision.
Loss	12–1–1	Kazushi Sakuraba	TKO (corner stoppage)	PRIDE Grand Prix 2000 Finals	May 1, 2000	6	15:00	Tokyo, Japan	2000 PRIDE Openweight Grand Prix Quarterfinal; Rules modified for unlimited rounds and no referee stoppages.
Win	12–0–1	Nobuhiko Takada	Decision (unanimous)	PRIDE Grand Prix 2000 Opening Round	January 30, 2000	1	15:00	Tokyo, Japan	
Draw	11–0–1	Ken Shamrock	Draw (time limit)	UFC 5	April 7, 1995	1	36:00	Charlotte, North Carolina, United States	For the inaugural UFC Superfight Championship. Match was declared a draw due to lack of judges. Longest fight in UFC history.
Win	11–0	Dan Severn	Submission (triangle choke)	UFC 4	December 16, 1994	1	15:49	Tulsa, Oklahoma, United States	Won the UFC 4 Tournament. Became the first and only three time UFC Tournament Winner.
Win	10–0	Keith Hackney	Submission (armbar)	UFC 4	December 16, 1994	1	5:32	Tulsa, Oklahoma, United States	UFC 4 Tournament Semifinal.
Win	9–0	Ron van Clief	Submission (rear-naked choke)	UFC 4	December 16, 1994	1	3:59	Tulsa, Oklahoma, United States	UFC 4 Tournament Quarterfinal.
Win	8–0	Kimo Leopoldo	Submission (armbar)	UFC 3	September 9, 1994	1	4:40	Charlotte, North Carolina, United States	UFC 3 Tournament Quarterfinal. Gracie withdrew from tournament afterwards.
Win	7–0	Patrick Smith	TKO (submission to punches)	UFC 2	March 11, 1994	1	1:17	Denver, Colorado, United States	Won the UFC 2 Tournament.
Win	6–0	Remco Pardoel	Submission (lapel choke)	UFC 2	March 11, 1994	1	1:31	Denver, Colorado, United States	UFC 2 Tournament Semifinal.
Win	5–0	Jason DeLucia	Submission (armbar)	UFC 2	March 11, 1994	1	1:07	Denver, Colorado, United States	UFC 2 Tournament Quarterfinal.
Win	4–0	Minoki Ichihara	Submission (lapel choke)	UFC 2	March 11, 1994	1	5:08	Denver, Colorado, United States	UFC 2 Tournament Opening Round.
Win	3–0	Gerard Gordeau	Submission (rear-naked choke)	UFC 1	November 12, 1993	1	1:44	Denver, Colorado, United States	Won the UFC 1 Tournament.
Win	2–0	Ken Shamrock	Submission (rear-naked choke)	UFC 1	November 12, 1993	1	0:57	Denver, Colorado, United States	UFC 1 Tournament Semifinal.
Win	1–0	Art Jimmerson	Submission (smother choke)	UFC 1	November 12, 1993	1	2:18	Denver, Colorado, United States	UFC 1 Tournament Quarterfinal.

== Submission grappling record ==
Result	Opponent	Method	Event	Date	Round	Time	Notes
Lose	(Brazil) Wallid Ismail	Technical submission (clock choke)	Oscar de Jiu-Jitsu	December 17, 1998	n/a	4:53	No time limit, no points.

== See also ==
- Rodrigo Gracie
- List of doping cases in sport
- List of Brazilian Jiu-Jitsu practitioners

== Notes ==
Achievements
New championship	UFC 1 Tournament winner November 12, 1993	Succeeded by Royce Gracie
Preceded by Royce Gracie	UFC 2 Tournament winner March 11, 1994	Succeeded by Steve Jennum
Preceded by Steve Jennum	UFC 4 Tournament winner December 16, 1994	Succeeded by Dan Severn
