= Remco Pardoel =

Dutch mixed martial artist

- Born: 23 May 1969 (age 57); Oss, Netherlands
- Height: 6 ft 4 in (1.93 m)
- Weight: 260 lb (120 kg; 19 st)
- Division: Heavyweight
- Style: Jujutsu, Aikido, Taekwondo, Karate, Boxing, Judo, Muay Thai, Luta Livre, Brazilian Jiu-Jitsu
- Team: Pardoel Sports
- Rank: 4th degree black belt in Brazilian Jiu-Jitsu; 2nd dan black belt in Taekwondo; 2nd dan black belt in Jujutsu; 1st dan black belt in Judo
- Years active: 1994–2003

Mixed martial arts record
- Total: 19
- Wins: 10
- By knockout: 2
- By submission: 6
- By decision: 2
- Losses: 6
- By knockout: 3
- By submission: 2
- By decision: 1
- Draws: 1
- No contests: 2

Other information
- Mixed martial arts record from Sherdog

Remco Pardoel (born 23 May 1969) is a retired Dutch mixed martial artist. He competed in the heavyweight division. He has fought in promotions such as the UFC, Shooto, and Pancrase. He was runner up at the junior national championships in Judo in 1988 and a competitive BJJ grappler. He made his MMA debut at UFC 2, eventually losing to Royce Gracie. Throughout his career, he fought Vernon White, Minoru Suzuki, and Marco Ruas.

== Early career ==
Pardoel began his martial arts career at age 4 when he first began training in Judo. At age 7, he began training in Taekwondo and took up traditional Jiu-Jitsu at age 11. He won silver at the 1988 Junior National Judo Championships in the Netherlands and several Ju Jitsu titles across Europe. He became Ju Jitsu's world champion in 1993 when the sport's first World Championship was held in Denmark. He met Fabio Gurgel, Romero Cavalcanti, Sylvio Behring, and other fighters, who taught him some of the sport's techniques. He would invite the Brazilian team to the Netherlands, so Brazilian Jiu-Jitsu was introduced in Europe, in his hometown of Oss, starting in November 1993.

=== Ultimate Fighting Championship ===
In 1994, Pardoel was invited to the Ultimate Fighting Championship at its event UFC 2 in the United States. Cornered by UFC 1 finalist Gerard Gordeau, Remco was billed as a Jiu-Jitsu fighter and was pitted in the first round of the tournament against Alberto Cerro León, a Spanish Pencak Silat practitioner. The bout was long and violent, as although Pardoel threw León to the ground early, the Spaniard resisted his armlock attempts and even tried an illegal fish-hook on repeated occasions. In the end, Pardoel submitted him with a sode guruma jime. The Dutch fighter was later quoted as: "Alberto was the reason I entered the UFC... In Europe, the guys from Pencak Silat and Wing Chun are badmouthing all other styles by saying and writing that they are invincible, which [they're] not. So, challenging them is the best way to prove they are wrong."

Pardoel advanced to the next round and fought Muay Thai fighter Orlando Wiet in a memorable match. The heavier Pardoel executed a hip throw and pinned Wiet on the mat with ura gatame. After some hesitation, the Jiu-Jitsu champion landed seven brutal elbow strikes on Wiet's temple, resulting in a knockout. Wiet was rendered unconscious after the second blow, and Pardoel had to speak to the referee to stop the match. The Dutch contender went to the semi-finals to face UFC 1 winner Royce Gracie, another Brazilian Jiu-Jitsu exponent. Seconds into the match, Royce captured Pardoel's back while standing, tripped him down, and performed a gi choke, making Remco tap out.

He returned to UFC in September 1995 at the event UFC 7. His first opponent would be Karateka Ryan Parker, whom he defeated swiftly by throwing him down, pinning him with kesa gatame, and locking a mounted Ezekiel choke. The Dutchman advanced to meet Luta Livre legend Marco Ruas, the eventual winner. Pardoel got a guillotine choke early, but Ruas escaped via foot stomps, and they both met on the ground, where the Brazilian tried a straight-ankle lock to no avail. After some minutes of struggle, Ruas mounted Pardoel, and the latter opted to tap out. Pardoe later claimed that Ruas was using body oil or lubricant to hinder his hold. It would be Pardoel's last appearance in UFC.

== BJJ black belt controversy ==
In 2023, Remco made false claims about receiving a record-fast black belt and being the first European promoted to black belt in 1996.

Remco was awarded his black belt in 2007 by Vinicius Magalhães (Draculino), which today would make him a 4th-degree black belt. He wore stripes on his belt according to Draculino's promotion up to 2023 when he suddenly claimed he was promoted to black belt already in 1996 by Fernando Yamasaki and Carlos Gracie Jr. This would have made him the first European-born BJJ black belt as well as the fastest ever to receive a BJJ black belt, in only 2 years and 2 months from getting his first BJJ lesson, from visiting Brazilians.

The claim seems to stem from the early days of international CBJJ competitions when lower belts on several occasions were allowed to compete together with black belts (first BJJ World championship, first BJJ European championship, etc.), and Remco was allowed to compete in the black belt division of the World Championship in Rio 1996. Over the years, Remco has been clear that he had no belt in BJJ at the time and did not belong in the top 8 brackets in the sport. He also competed as a BJJ purple belt in the Budweiser Cup in the US in 2005. Remco has also confirmed that he was only the second person in Holland to receive a BJJ black belt. An investigation on Beltchecker (readable only after logging in) has provided further evidence against Remco's new claims and word from Fernando Yamasaki that he has never promoted Remco to black belt.

== Mixed martial arts record ==
Professional record breakdown
19 matches	10 wins	6 losses
By knockout	2	3
By submission	6	2
By decision	2	1
Draws	1	
No contests	2	

Res.	Record	Opponent	Method	Event	Date	Round	Time	Location	Notes
Loss	9–6–1 (2)	Tengiz Tedoradze	TKO (submission to punches)	EF 1: Genesis	13 July 2003	1	2:44	London, England	
NC	9–5–1 (2)	Roger Godinez	No Contest	GC 11: Gladiator Challenge 11	20 April 2002	1	0:17	San Jacinto, California, United States	
Loss	9–5–1 (1)	Mark Smith	Decision	CW 1: Cage Wars 1	23 February 2002	2	0:00	Portsmouth, England	
Win	9–4–1 (1)	Glen Brown	Submission (scarf hold)	UKMMAC 1: Sudden Impact	11 November 2001	2	0:00	Kent, England	
Draw	8–4–1 (1)	Herman van Tol	Draw	Rings Holland: No Guts, No Glory	10 June 2001	2	5:00	Amsterdam, North Holland, Netherlands	
Win	8–4 (1)	Marc Emmanuel	Decision (unanimous)	Rings Holland: Heroes Live Forever	28 January 2001	2	5:00	Utrecht, Netherlands	
Loss	7–4 (1)	Roman Savochka	TKO (submission to strikes)	IAFC: Pankration World Championship 2000 [Day 2]	29 April 2000	1	0:00	Moscow, Russia	
Win	7–3 (1)	John Dixson	Submission (headlock)	AAC 2: Amsterdam Absolute Championship 2	27 November 1999	1	8:15	Amsterdam, North Holland, Netherlands	
Win	6–3 (1)	Michailis Deligiannakis	Submission (keylock)	WVC 8: World Vale Tudo Championship 8	1 July 1999	1	2:20	Aruba	
Win	5–3 (1)	John Dixson	Submission (choke)	AAC 1: Amsterdam Absolute Championship 1	25 October 1998	1	4:16	Amsterdam, North Holland, Netherlands	
Loss	4–3 (1)	Marco Ruas	Submission (position)	UFC 7: The Brawl in Buffalo	8 September 1995	1	12:27	Buffalo, New York, United States	UFC 5 Tournament Semifinals.
Win	4–2 (1)	Ryan Parker	Submission (Ezekiel choke)	UFC 7: The Brawl in Buffalo	8 September 1995	1	3:05	Buffalo, New York, United States	UFC 5 Tournament Quarterfinals.
NC	3–2 (1)	Carl Franks	No Contest	Shooto: Complete Vale Tudo Access	29 July 1995	1	8:00	Omiya, Saitama, Japan	
Loss	3–2	Minoru Suzuki	KO (punch)	Pancrase: Road To The Championship 3	26 July 1994	1	7:16	Tokyo, Japan	
Win	3–1	Vernon White	TKO (lost points)	Pancrase: Road To The Championship 2	6 July 1994	1	14:24	Amagasaki, Hyogo, Japan	
Loss	2–1	Royce Gracie	Submission (lapel choke)	UFC 2: No Way Out	11 March 1994	1	1:31	Denver, Colorado, United States	UFC 2 Tournament Semifinals.
Win	2–0	Orlando Wiet	KO (elbows)	UFC 2: No Way Out	11 March 1994	1	1:29	Denver, Colorado, United States	UFC 2 Tournament Quarterfinals.
Win	1–0	Alberto Cerra Leon	Submission (forearm choke)	UFC 2: No Way Out	11 March 1994	1	9:51	Denver, Colorado, United States	UFC 2 Tournament Opening Round.

== Submission grappling record ==
Result	Opponent	Method	Event	Date	Round	Time	Notes
Loss	(United States) Pete Williams	Decision	ADCC world championship 2000	2000			
Loss	(Brazil) Ricardo Liborio	Submission (armbar)	World Jiu-jitsu Championship	1996			

== See also ==
- List of male mixed martial artists
