= Orlando Wiet =

Surinamese-Dutch mixed martial arts fighter (1965–2026)

- Born: 24 October 1965; Paramaribo, Dutch Guiana, (now Suriname)
- Died: 26 March 2026 (aged 60)
- Nationality: Dutch
- Height: 5 ft 10 in (1.78 m)
- Weight: 170 lb (77 kg; 12 st)
- Division: Welterweight
- Style: Muay Thai
- Fighting out of: France
- Team: Team Wiet
- Years active: 1994–1998

Mixed martial arts record
- Total: 6
- Wins: 1
- By knockout: 1
- Losses: 5
- By knockout: 1
- By submission: 4

Other information
- Mixed martial arts record from Sherdog

Orlando Wiet (24 October 1965 – 26 March 2026) was a Surinamese-Dutch world champion kickboxer, boxer and mixed martial artist.

== Kickboxing ==
Orlando Otmar Wiet started his career in Purmerend with Cees van der Velden and then trained in Breda with Ramon Dekkers and Cor Hemmers. He also trained in Thailand in Buriram Nonkee Payuthe with Mr. Pramote and fought in the Old Lumpini Stadium in Bangkok, Thailand for the promoter Songchai Ratanasuban, the first non-Thai fighter to win a fight by decision. Wiet fought at K-1 and It's Showtime tournaments. In 1985, Wiet defeated Stephane Nikiema and won a European Muay Thai championship. In 1989, he defeated Omar Benamar and won a world title. Wiet defeated Ivan Hippolyte in April 1995. He then defeated Azem Maksutaj and after that he took part in the K-1 Grand Prix tournament in July 1995, beating Franz Haller in the first round and losing to Taiei Kin in the second round. Ivan Hippolyte, who lost to Wiet in a previous match, won the tournament.

== Mixed martial arts ==
In 1994, Wiet decided to take part in the tournament UFC 2, as the first fighter living in France. UFC 2 was a tournament with fighters of different styles. Wiet represented Muay Thai. He was the lightest fighter among the sixteen participants of the tournament, weighting 170 pounds. However, in the opening round, he could use his Muay Thai techniques and defeated 6.2 tall and 245 pounds Robert Lucarelli by TKO (Corner Stoppage) with elbow, knee strikes and punches. Then, in the quarterfinals, he faced the tallest and heaviest judo fighter of that tournament, 6.4 tall and 260 pounds Remco Pardoel. Pardoel could use his weight advantage and Wiet lost by TKO and got seriously injured. After he lost to Todd Bjornethun a year later, Wiet decided to focus on boxing and kickboxing.

== Boxing ==
Wiet started his boxing career with Jean Robert Pujol in 1996. He participated in boxing matches in parallel with kickboxing. After a four win streak, he was defeated by Aziz Daari. His next fights were not so successful as in kickboxing. He had matches against opponents such as Byron Mitchell and Bruno Girard.

== After retiring ==
Wiet's career ended in 1999 when he sustained a critical groin injury throwing a high kick in training. Wiet retired from fighting in 1999 after 180 fights and number of injuries. However, he came back once in 2005, once in 2008 and once in 2011 to fight in MMA. He lost all three fights by submission. Wiet subsequently worked as a coach, training fighters such as Karim Souda .

== Personal life and death ==
Orlando Wiet was married to Valérie Hénin, a female boxer with 2-0-1 record in professional boxing and kickboxer with 0–2 record. Valerie helped her husband in training for part of his matches. The couple broke up a little later. Orlando had two daughters, Magda Wiet-Hénin and Lena Wiet Mathis. Magda Wiet is a taekwondo world champion.

Wiet died on 26 March 2026, at the age of 60.

== Titles and achievements ==
- European Muay Thai Champion
- 5 time world Muay Thai Champion
- WTC Super Middleweight World Champion 1997

== Mixed martial arts record ==
Professional record breakdown
6 matches	1 win	5 losses
By knockout	1	1
By submission	0	4

Res.	Record	Opponent	Method	Event	Date	Round	Time	Location	Notes
Loss	1–5	Zoran Milovic	Submission (armbar)	GCP - Greater Champion Podgorica	May 19, 2011	1	0:43	Podgorica, Montenegro	
Loss	1–4	Paul Jenkins	Submission (americana)	NGT 5 - Iustitia Divina	December 14, 2008	2	1:50	Milan, Italy	
Loss	1–3	Mario Stapel	Submission	S-1 - European Grand Prix 2005	November 12, 2005	1	0:00	Germany	
Loss	1–2	Todd Bjornethun	Submission (triangle choke)	UFCF - United Full Contact Federation 1	September 8, 1995	1	5:43	United States	
Loss	1–1	Remco Pardoel	KO (elbows)	UFC 2: No Way Out	March 11, 1994	1	1:29	Denver, Colorado, United States	UFC 2 tournament quarterfinals.
Won	1–0	Robert Lucarelli	TKO (knees)	UFC 2: No Way Out	March 11, 1994	1	2:50	Denver, Colorado, United States	UFC 2 tournament first round.

== Kickboxing and Muay Thai record (incomplete) ==
Kickboxing record (Incomplete)
134 Wins (47 (T)KO's), 21 Losses
Date	Result	Opponent	Event	Location	Method	Round	Time
1999-10-24	Draw	(Netherlands) Perry Ubeda	It's Showtime - It's Showtime	Haarlem, Netherlands	Decision Draw	5	3:00
1997-06-07	Loss	(Japan) Taiei Kin	K-1: Fight Night '97	Zurich, Switzerland	Decision	5	3:00
1996	Loss	(France) Aurélien Duarte		France	Decision	5	3:00
1996-06-02	Win	(Japan) Toshiyuki Atokawa	K-1 Fight Night	Zurich, Switzerland	TKO	2	0:30
	Loss	(France) Aurélien Duarte		Paris, France	Decision	5	3:00
	Draw	(France) Aurélien Duarte		Nancy, France	Decision	5	3:00
1995-07-16	Loss	(Japan) Taiei Kin	K-1: Legend 95	Nagoya, Japan	Decision · Majority	3	3:00
1995-07-16	Win	(Italy) Franz Haller	K-1: Legend 95	Nagoya, Japan	Decision	3	3:00
1995-06-10	Win	(Albania) Azem Maksutaj	K-1 Fight Night	Zurich, Switzerland	KO (left punch)	2	2:45
1995-04-02	Win	(Netherlands) Ivan Hippolyte		Amsterdam, Netherlands	Decision	5	3:00
1994-12-10	Loss	(Japan) Taro Minato	K-1: Legend 94	Nagoya, Japan	Decision	5	3:00
1994-09-18	Loss	(Japan) Taiei Kin	K-1 Revenge	Yokohama, Japan	KO (Right high kick)	4	0:08
1992-06-21	Loss	(France) Farid Kenniche		Paris, France	Decision	5	3:00
1992-04-09	Loss	(France) Stephane Nikiema	Paris Fight Night 1992	Paris, France	Decision	5	3:00
1992	Loss	(Thailand) Changpuek Kiatsongrit		Olham, England, UK	Decision(split)	5	3:00
1992	Loss	(Thailand) Jomhod Kiatadisak		Germany			
1991-04-21	Loss	(Netherlands) Ivan Hippolyte	Kickboxing "Holland vs Canada"	Amsterdam, Netherlands	Decision	5	3:00
1989	Win	(France) Omar Benamar		Amsterdam, Netherlands	Decision	5	3:00
1988-11-20	Loss	(Netherlands) Ivan Hippolyte		Amsterdam, Netherlands	Decision	5	3:00
1987-11-17	Loss	(Netherlands) Luc Verheye		Amsterdam, Netherlands	Ko	2	1:27
1986	Loss	(Thailand) Krongsak Sakkasem		France	Decision	5	3:00
1985-12-28	Win	(Netherlands) Stéphane Nikiéma	European Muaythai Championship	Amsterdam, Netherlands	Decision	5	3:00
	Win	(United Kingdom) Keith Nathan			KO	4	1:47
	Win	(Netherlands) Bayram Colak			Decision	5	3:00

== Professional boxing record ==
16 fights	8 wins	8 losses
By knockout	4	2
By decision	4	6

No.	Result	Record	Opponent	Type	Round	Date	Location	Notes
14	Win	8–6	Andreas Marks	Decision		1999-Feb-2	Pont-Sainte-Maxence,France	
13	Win	7–6	Andras Galfi	Decision		1998-Jun-2	Saverne,France	
12	Loss	6–6	Olivier Beard	TKO		1998-Feb-7	Le Havre,France	
11	Loss	6–5	Bruno Girard	Decision		1997-Dec-6	Dombasle-sur-Meurthe,France	
10	Loss	6–4	Byron Mitchell	Decision		1997-Jul-8	Palais des Sports, Marseille,France	
9	Loss	6–3	Didier Poujol	Decision		1997-Jun-20	Marignane,France	
8	Win	6–2	Wilhem Thelineau	KO		1997-May-24	Nancy,France	
7	Win	5–2	Allaoua Anki	TKO		1997-Apr-19	Lingolsheim,France	
6	Loss	4–2	(France) Youssef Temsoury	Decision		1997-Apr-4	Cahors,France	
5	Loss	4–1	(France) Aziz Daari	KO		1997-Feb-7	Chateauroux,France	
4	Win	4–0	(Switzerland) Francesco Passanante	Decision		1996-Nov-19	Chenove,France	
3	Win	3–0	(France) Youssef Temsoury	Decision		1996-Jun-29	Brive,France	
2	Win	2–0	(France) Christophe Cochet	TKO		11 May 1996	Colmar, Germany	
1	Win	1–0	(France) Halim Badani	TKO		06 Jan 1996	Palais des Sport Marcel Cerdan, Levallois-Perret, Paris, France	
