= UFC 2 =

UFC mixed martial arts event in 1994

UFC 2: No Way Out
- The poster for UFC 2: No Way Out
- Promotion: Ultimate Fighting Championship
- Date: March 11, 1994
- Venue: Mammoth Events Center
- City: Denver, Colorado
- Attendance: 2,000
- Buyrate: 300,000

Event chronology
UFC 1: The Beginning	UFC 2: No Way Out	UFC 3: The American Dream

The Ultimate Fighting Championship Part II (later renamed UFC 2: No Way Out) was a mixed martial arts (MMA) event held by the Ultimate Fighting Championship on March 11, 1994, at Mammoth Events Center in Denver, Colorado. The event was seen live on pay-per-view in the United States, and was later released on home video.

== History ==
UFC 2 featured a sixteen-man tournament format, the first and only one in UFC history, with the winner receiving $60,000. The first seven bouts were not aired on the live pay-per-view broadcast, nor were they on the home video version (VHS). The tournament had no weight classes or weight limits. Matches had no time limit or rounds, therefore no judges were used. Competitors could only win a match by submission, by the opponent's corner throwing in the towel, or by knockout.

UFC 2 marked the debut of referee John McCarthy, arguably the most famous referee in the sport of MMA. Since this was the only 16-man tournament in UFC history, Royce Gracie is the only person to have ever fought and won four fights in one night in the UFC.

A the fights on the opening round (except for Gracie vs. Ichihara) were not exhibited on pay-per-view due time constrains. These "lost fights" were later also not included on the VHS or DVD release of the event. They would only be released later to UFC Fight Pass.

Stuntman and co-creator of the UFC Ben Perry joined the announcing crew for the first time in UFC 2. He was quoted that evening as introducing Scott Morris into the ring by saying: "We don’t know much about Scott Morris, because he is a Ninja". This event did a buyrate of 300,000.

== Results ==
Final
Weight class				Method	Round	Time	Notes
N/A	Royce Gracie	def.	Patrick Smith	TKO (submission to punches)		1:17
Semifinals
N/A	Patrick Smith	def.	Johnny Rhodes	Submission (guillotine choke)		1:07
N/A	Royce Gracie	def.	Remco Pardoel	Submission (lapel choke)		1:31
Quarterfinals
N/A	Patrick Smith	def.	Scott Morris	KO (elbows)		0:30
N/A	Johnny Rhodes	def.	Fred Ettish	Submission (bulldog choke)		3:07	(Note: Frank Hamaker was forced to withdraw due to injury. He was replaced by Fred Ettish. Another alternate was Trent Jenkins. but didn't fight. it is showing UFC 2 ending credit. There was no alternate match because there was no time in the round of 16.)
N/A	Remco Pardoel	def.	Orlando Wiet	KO (elbows)		1:29
N/A	Royce Gracie	def.	Jason DeLucia	Submission (armbar)		1:07
Opening Round
N/A	Scott Morris	def.	Sean Daugherty	Submission (guillotine choke)		0:20
N/A	Patrick Smith	def.	Ray Wizard	Submission (guillotine choke)		0:58
N/A	Johnny Rhodes	def.	David Levicki	TKO (submission to punches)		12:13
N/A	Frank Hamaker	def.	Thaddeus Luster	TKO (corner stoppage)		4:52
N/A	Orlando Wiet	def.	Robert Lucarelli	TKO (knees)		2:50
N/A	Remco Pardoel	def.	Alberto Cerro Leon	Submission (armlock)		9:51
N/A	Jason DeLucia	def.	Scott Baker	TKO (submission to punches)		6:41
N/A	Royce Gracie	def.	Minoki Ichihara	Submission (lapel choke)		5:08

== UFC 2 bracket ==
Opening Round
(United States) Scott Morris (Ninjitsu)	SUB
(United States) Sean Daugherty (Taekwondo)	0:20
(United States) Patrick Smith (Kickboxing)	SUB
(United States) Ray Wizard (Karate)	0:58
(United States) Johnny Rhodes (Karate)	SUB
(United States) David Levicki (Wing Chun)	12:13
(Netherlands) Freek Hamaker (Sambo)	SUB
(United States) Thaddeus Luster (San Soo)	4:52
(France) Orlando Wiet (Muay Thai)	TKO
(United States) Robert Lucarelli (Kickboxing)	2:50
(Netherlands) Remco Pardoel (Judo)	SUB
(Spain) Alberto Cerro Leon (Pencak Silat)	9:51
(United States) Jason Delucia (Kung Fu)	SUB
(United States) Scott Baker (Wing Chun)	6:41
(Brazil) Royce Gracie (Brazilian Jiu-Jitsu)	SUB
(Japan) Minoki Ichihara (Karate)	5:08

Quarterfinals
(United States) Scott Morris	0:30
(United States) Patrick Smith	KO
(United States) Johnny Rhodes	SUB
(United States) Fred Ettish (Karate) ^{1}	3:07
(France) Orlando Wiet	1:29
(Netherlands) Remco Pardoel	KO
(United States) Jason Delucia	1:07
(Brazil) Royce Gracie	SUB

Semifinals
(United States) Patrick Smith	SUB
(United States) Johnny Rhodes	1:07
(Netherlands) Remco Pardoel	1:31
(Brazil) Royce Gracie	SUB

Finals
(United States) Patrick Smith	1:17
(Brazil) Royce Gracie	TKO

^{1} Frank Hamaker was forced to withdraw due to injury. He was replaced by Fred Ettish.

== Encyclopedia awards ==
The following fighters were honored in the October 2011 book titled UFC Encyclopedia.

- Fight of the Night: Royce Gracie vs. Minoki Ichihara
- Knockout of the Night: Patrick Smith def. Scott Morris
- Submission of the Night: Royce Gracie def. Remco Pardoel

== See also ==
- Ultimate Fighting Championship
- List of UFC champions
- List of UFC events
- 1994 in UFC
