= Trent Jenkins =

American mixed martial arts fighter

- Born: United States
- Nationality: American
- Height: 6 ft 2 in (1.88 m)
- Weight: 185 lb (84 kg; 13.2 st)
- Division: Middleweight
- Style: Kempo Karate, Boxing
- Rank: Black Belt in Kempo Karate
- Years active: 1993 - 2000

Mixed martial arts record
- Total: 4
- Wins: 0
- Losses: 4
- By knockout: 1
- By submission: 3

Other information
- Mixed martial arts record from Sherdog

Trent Jenkins is an American mixed martial artist. He competed in the Middleweight division. Jenkins was a competitor in the first ever UFC event, losing in an alternate bout to Jason DeLucia. Jenkins was also due to fight in the alternate bout at UFC 2 but there was not enough time after the round of 16.

== Mixed martial arts record ==
Professional record breakdown
4 matches	0 wins	4 losses
By knockout	0	1
By submission	0	3

Res.	Record	Opponent	Method	Event	Date	Round	Time	Location	Notes
Loss	0–4	Griffen Reynaud	Submission (keylock)	Rings USA: Rising Stars Block A	July 15, 2000	1	2:27	Orem, Utah, United States	
Loss	0–3	Josh Reason	TKO (punches)	BRI 1: Bas Rutten Invitational 1	February 6, 1999	1	4:49	United States	
Loss	0–2	Mark Hall	Submission (armlock)	UFC: Ultimate Ultimate 1995	December 16, 1995	1	5:29	Denver, Colorado, United States	
Loss	0–1	Jason DeLucia	Submission (rear-naked choke)	UFC 1: The Beginning	November 12, 1993	1	0:52	Denver, Colorado, United States	

== See also ==
- List of male mixed martial artists
