= Kevin Rosier =

American mixed martial arts fighter

- Born: January 6, 1962; Springville, New York, U.S.
- Died: April 14, 2015 (aged 53); Murfreesboro, Tennessee, U.S.
- Height: 6 ft 4 in (1.93 m)
- Weight: 265 lb (120 kg; 18.9 st)
- Division: Heavyweight (Boxing, Kickboxing and MMA)
- Reach: 79 in (201 cm)
- Style: Karate, Kickboxing
- Fighting out of: Tampa, Florida, U.S.
- Rank: Black Belt in Karate
- Years active: 1980–1999 (Kickboxing); 1989–2001 (Boxing); 1993–2000 (MMA)

Professional boxing record
- Total: 24
- Wins: 7
- By knockout: 6
- Losses: 17
- By knockout: 7

Kickboxing record
- Total: 74
- Wins: 66
- By knockout: 66
- Losses: 8

Mixed martial arts record
- Total: 8
- Wins: 2
- By knockout: 1
- By submission: 1
- Losses: 6
- By knockout: 3
- By submission: 3

Other information
- Boxing record from BoxRec
- Mixed martial arts record from Sherdog

Kevin Rosier (January 6, 1962 – April 14, 2015) was an American kickboxer, boxer and mixed martial artist. Rosier had notable success as a kickboxer, winning a number of national, continental and world titles in the heavyweight and super heavyweight divisions during the 1980s and 1990s, while also embarking on a career as a journeyman fighter in professional boxing. In mixed martial arts, he competed at the inaugural Ultimate Fighting Championship event in 1993, reaching the tournament semi-finals.

== Early life ==
Rosier was born into a farming family of French-Canadian descent and raised in the Lovejoy neighborhood of Buffalo, New York. He attended East Aurora High School, where he played football and competed in track and field, before working as a bouncer at various Buffalo nightclubs. Rosier also worked as a bodyguard to entertainers including Rick James, Billy Idol, and Debbie Harry.

== Career ==
=== Kickboxing and boxing ===
Beginning in the 1980s, Rosier spent the majority of his fighting career in kickboxing, where he held a record of 66 wins, all by knockout, and 8 losses. He was an International Sport Karate Association (ISKA) North American Super Heavyweight Champion and a three-time World Kickboxing Association (WKA) World Super Heavyweight Champion. Rosier's last bout came in 1999 when he lost to Mike Labree in a fight for the vacant International Kickboxing Federation (IKF) Pro Full Contact Rules Super Heavyweight World title on May 15, 1999, in Lowell, Massachusetts. At 26 seconds into round 10, LaBree caught Rosier with a short left to the head and Rosier went down to his knees and the bout was stopped.

He also had a 12-year career as a professional boxer in which he held a 7–17 record. Rosier boxed between 1989 and 2001 and came up against a number of notable opponents including Josué Blocus, Roman Bugaj, Tye Fields, Vincent Maddalone, Joe Mesi, Nikolai Valuev, Taurus Sykes, and Paea Wolfgramm.

=== Ultimate Fighting Championship ===
In 1993, with only three weeks notice, Rosier elicited the help of his former student World Kickboxing Champion A.J. Verel to coach and train him for UFC 1, the very first mixed martial arts event held by the Ultimate Fighting Championship. His first match in the tournament, the second in the card, pitted him against American Kenpo expert and two-time World Kickboxing Federation super heavyweight champion Zane Frazier.

Rosier opened the match knocking Frazier down with punches, knee strikes and an elbow strike to the turtled-up Frazier's back, but his opponent recovered and went to exchange knee strikes with him in the clinch. At that moment, capitalizing on the lack of regulation about hair pulling and groin attacks, Frazier managed to take over by striking Rosier with a low blow and dragging him by the hair. The kenpo fighter dominated the fight with striking combinations both standing and on their knees, even breaking Rosier's jaw with a right hand. Some minutes later, however, Frazier slowed down due to exhaustion, allowing Rosier to recover and come back with several punches that put Frazier against the fence. Rosier then pushed him down to the mat and scored multiple punches and stomps to the back of the head until Frazier's corner threw the towel.

In the semifinals, Rosier came up against Dutch savate fighter Gerard Gordeau. The Dutchman targeted Rosier's knees with leg kicks and kept distance with him through jabbing. When Rosier was forced to cover down after a barrage of knees and elbows, Gordeau scored a stomp to the spleen, prompting Rosier to tap on the mat, signalling his submission. Although eliminated from the tournament, Rosier praised Gordeau and expressed the desire to return.

After this, he continued to compete in MMA and next fought at UFC 4 where he lost via submission 14 seconds into his bout with "The Ghetto Man" Joe Charles. He competed five more times in MMA, losing four and winning one, and retired with a record of two wins and six losses.

=== Professional wrestling ===
On October 24, 1998, Rosier lost a worked match against the original Tiger Mask, Satoru Sayama, by submission to a leg lock in the Universal Fighting-Arts Organization.

== Later life ==
After retiring from competition, Rosier suffered several bouts of illness (including open-heart surgery and a nearly fatal fall while already in intensive care). By August 2013, he was in stable health and reportedly residing in a retirement resort in suburban Nashville.

Rosier died of an apparent heart attack on April 14, 2015, aged 53, while living at The Manor at Steeplechase, an assisted living center in Cool Springs, Tennessee. He had been suffering from dementia.

== Championships and awards ==
=== Kickboxing ===
- 1994 WKKC (World Karate and Kickboxing Council) World Superheavyweight Champion
- 1990 WKA (World Karate Association) World Superheavyweight Champion (above the waist)
- 1990 ISKA (International Sport Karate Association) North American Superheavyweight Champion
- 3X WKA (World Kickboxing Association) World Superheavyweight Champion
- 1989 All-Japan World Champion
- 1987 United States Kung-Fu Karate National No-Rules Tournament Champion
- 1989 WKA (World Karate Association) World Championship Title Fight (full contact karate)

== Kickboxing record ==
Kickboxing record
66 wins (66 KOs), 8 losses, 0 draws
Date	Result	Opponent	Event	Location	Method	Round	Time	Record
1999-05-15	Loss	(United States) Mike Labree	Mass Destruction: The Ultimate Night of Fighting	Lowell, Massachusetts, USA	TKO (left hook)	10	0:26	66–8
For the IKF World Super Heavyweight Full Contact Championship.
1995-04-19	Loss	(United States) Mike Vieira	Miccosukee Heritage:	Homestead, Florida, USA	TKO (left hook)	1	2:26	
1994-01-04	Win	(United States) Houston Dorr	Biloxi Fight Night	Biloxi, Mississippi, USA	KO (right hook)	2	1:25	
Wins the WKKC World Super Heavyweight Championship.
1990-01-20	Loss	(United States) Maurice Smith	AJKF: Inspiring Wars 1	Tokyo, Japan	KO (left jab and right overhand)	2	1:42	15–4
For the WKA World Heavyweight Championship.
1989-05-14	Win	(United States) Don Nakaya Nielsen	AJKF: Knockout of the Century - Part 3	Tokyo, Japan	TKO (referee stoppage/right uppercut)	6	1:05	15–2
Retains WKA World Super Heavyweight Championship.
1989-04-21	Win	(United States) Dan Voss Jr	Coors Superfights: Full Contact Karate	Santa Clara, California, USA	TKO (referee stoppage)	2	1:36	
Retains WKA World Super Heavyweight Championship.
Legend: Win Loss Draw/No contest Notes

== Professional boxing record ==
7 Wins (6 knockouts, 1 decision, 0 disqualification), 17 Losses, 0 Draws, 0 No Contests
Res.	Record	Opponent	Type	Rd., Time	Date	Location	Notes
Loss	7–17	(United States) Carlton Johnson	UD	6 (6), 3:00	01/12/2001	(United States) Chester, West Virginia, U.S.	
Loss	7–16	(France) Josué Blocus	TKO	1 (?), N/A	09/12/2000	Villeurbanne, France	
Loss	7–15	(United States) Tye Fields	TKO	1 (4), 1:37	28/04/2000	(United States) Mashantucket, Connecticut, U.S.	
Loss	7–14	(United States) Keith Govan	UD	4 (4), 3:00	06/04/2000	(United States) Worley, Idaho, U.S.	
Loss	7–13	(United States) Vinny Maddalone	PTS	6 (6), 3:00	14/03/2000	(United States) Yonkers, New York, U.S.	
Loss	7–12	(Poland) Roman Bugaj	UD	4 (4), 3:00	02/03/2000	(United States) Rosemont, Illinois, U.S.	
Loss	7–11	(United States) Taurus Sykes	PTS	4 (4), 3:00	24/02/2000	(United States) New York, New York, U.S.	
Loss	7–10	(United States) Shannon Miller	UD	4 (4), 3:00	19/11/1999	(United States) Verona, New York, U.S.	
Loss	7–9	(United States) Brian Hollins	UD	4 (4), 3:00	17/09/1999	(United States) Buffalo, New York, U.S.	
Loss	7–8	(United States) Derrick Brown	PTS	4 (4), 3:00	11/06/1999	(United States) Verona, New York, U.S.	
Loss	7–7	(United States) Bradley Rone	PTS	4 (4), 3:00	03/06/1999	(United States) Mount Pleasant, Michigan, U.S.	
Win	7–6	(United States) Dave Slaughter	TKO	4 (6), 2:56	29/01/1999	(United States) Tampa, Florida, U.S.	
Win	6–6	(United States) Ed Gissendanner	TKO	1 (6), 1:55	27/11/1998	(United States) Tampa, Florida, U.S.	
Win	5–6	(United States) Tony Velasco	UD	8 (8), 3:00	30/10/1998	(United States) Tampa, Florida, U.S.	
Loss	4–6	(United States) Joe Mesi	TKO	2 (4), N/A	26/07/1998	(United States) Verona, New York, U.S.	
Loss	4–5	(Tonga) Paea Wolfgramm	TKO	1 (6), 1:12	16/01/1998	(United States) Atlantic City, New Jersey, U.S.	
Loss	4–4	(Russia) Nikolai Valuev	KO	1 (?), N/A	27/09/1997	Moscow, Russia	
Win	4–3	(Finland) Christer Markusas	TKO	2 (?), N/A	06/09/1997	(United States) Atlantic City, New Jersey, U.S.	
Win	3–3	(United States) Jim Ellis	TKO	2 (?), N/A	27/08/1994	(United States) Harrisburg, Pennsylvania, U.S.	
Win	2–3	(United States) Lee Moore	TKO	3 (?), N/A	12/11/1990	(United States) Baton Rouge, Louisiana, U.S.	
Loss	1–3	(United States) David Dixon	TKO	1 (?), N/A	07/04/1990	(United States) Las Vegas, Nevada, U.S.	
Win	1–2	(United States) John Elacqua	TKO	2 (?), N/A	0/03/1989	(United States) Laughlin, Nevada, U.S.	
Loss	0–2	(United States) Curtis Jackson	PTS	4 (4), N/A	28/02/1989	(United States) Inglewood, California, U.S.	
Loss	0–1	(United States) Andrew Matthews	TKO	1 (?), N/A	14/01/1989	(United States) Las Vegas, Nevada, U.S.	

== Mixed martial arts record ==
Professional record breakdown
8 matches	2 wins	6 losses
By knockout	1	3
By submission	1	3
By decision	0	0
Draws	0	

Res.	Record	Opponent	Method	Event	Date	Round	Time	Location	Notes
Loss	2–6	Brad Gabriel	TKO (punches)	IFC: Battleground 2000	January 22, 2000	1	1:12	Kahnawake, Quebec, Canada	
Win	2–5	Joe Bramante	Submission (rear-naked choke)	IFC: Fighters Revenge	April 2, 1999	1	1:01	Kahnawake, Quebec, Canada	
Loss	1–5	Dan Severn	Submission	Cage Combat 1	December 8, 1998	1	1:00	Conesville, Iowa, United States	
Loss	1–4	Dan Severn	TKO (knees)	Extreme Challenge 15	February 27, 1998	1	0:53	Muncie, Indiana, United States	
Loss	1–3	Houston Dorr	Submission (guillotine choke)	IFC 2: Mayhem in Mississippi	August 23, 1996	1	11:10	Biloxi, Mississippi, United States	
Loss	1–2	Joe Charles	Submission (armbar)	UFC 4	December 16, 1994	1	0:14	Tulsa, Oklahoma, United States	
Loss	1–1	Gerard Gordeau	TKO (corner stoppage)	UFC 1	November 12, 1993	1	0:59	Denver, Colorado, United States	Semifinal bout.
Win	1–0	Zane Frazier	TKO (corner stoppage)	UFC 1	November 12, 1993	1	4:20	Denver, Colorado, United States	Quarterfinal bout.
