= Art Davie =

American mixed martial art executive

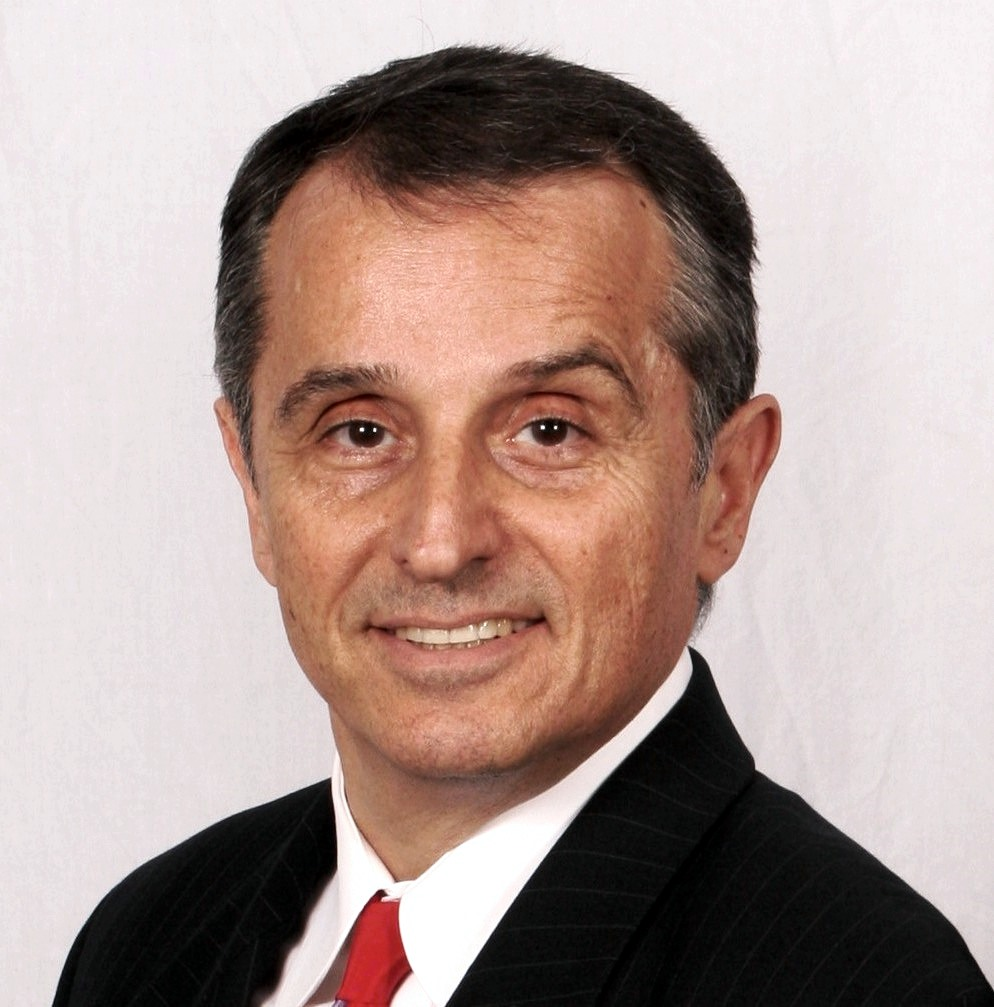
- Born: April 5, 1947 (age 79); Brooklyn, New York, U.S.
- Years active: 1975–present

Art Davie (born April 5, 1947) is a business executive and entrepreneur formerly active in Southern California advertising circles. In 1993, he created and co-produced the tournament which became the televised Ultimate Fighting Championship. In 1998, Davie, as vice-president of K-1 USA, brought the successful K-1 kickboxing franchise from Japan to Las Vegas and North American pay-per-view television. In 2003, Davie was an executive producer with Mandalay Sports Entertainment. In 2006, he became vice-president of television at Paradigm Entertainment Group. In 2014, Ascend Books published Davie's autobiography and memoir entitled, Is This Legal?: The Inside Story of the First UFC from the Man Who Created It named after a rejected offer from martial artist Chuck Norris, who asked if the UFC would be deemed legal. Sean Wheelock assisted in the book's research and writing.

In November 2014, Davie was inducted into the Legends of MMA Hall of Fame, alongside Big John McCarthy, Pat Miletich, Fedor Emelianenko, and Rickson Gracie. On 5 July 2018, he was inducted into the UFC Hall of Fame in the Contributors wing.

== XARM ==
Davie's new venture, XARM, is a hybrid sport that combines kickboxing and arm wrestling. While at a meeting in 2008 with executives from Piranha entertainment in Seattle, Davie announced he wanted back into the MMA industry, but estimated it would take millions of dollars to create a new brand that could compete with the UFC. Rather than do that he decided to brand a whole new sport all together, and XARM was created. Contested across a 28 in × 16 in (71 cm × 41 cm) table, adjustable for height from 34 to 46 in (0.86 to 1.17 m), bouts consist of three one-minute rounds, with a one-minute rest period between rounds. Athletes are allowed one assistant (second) at table-side. To prevent the fighters from separating, their arms used for the arm wrestling portion are bound together with a strap, leaving the other arm free to punch and submit the other fighter. In June 2008, Davie teamed up with fight promoter Ted Williams to film the first pilot. Williams provided Davie with his main card fighters from Gladiator Challenge. XARM was originally scheduled to have its first TV air date in 2012, but was put on hold. Davie, in 2011, announced a partnership with Sallyann Salsano, the show runner for Jersey Shore. The Show was hosted and coached by professional movie actor and Arm Wrestling legend, Andrew “Cobra” Rhodes, with longtime MMA Fighter Cal Worsham as the referee. In 2012, XARM announced a partnership with Machinima to produce online reality show episodes. It was later cancelled after one season with no reason listed and the organization itself went defunct shortly thereafter.

== Book ==
Davie wrote, with Sean Wheelock, Is This Legal?: The Inside Story of The First UFC From the Man Who Created It. It was published by Ascend Books on July 4, 2014. It chronicles the period October 1989 through November 13, 1993, when Davie worked on the first UFC event. The book also recounts Davie's military service after attending New York Military Academy, where he roomed with classmate Donald Trump for a semester.

In 2015, the book was optioned by Legacy Entertainment Partners to make into a feature movie. In 2017, the book was optioned by Nimitt Mankad of Inimitable Pictures.
