= 2007 IFL Grand Prix =

International Fight League MMA events in 2007

In 2007 the team with the most members in the Grand Prix were from the Los Angeles Anacondas with 4. The Toronto Dragons have 3 representatives while the New York Pitbulls, Nevada Lions and San Jose Razorclaws have 2. Due to injuries the Chicago Red Bears and the Seattle Tiger Sharks do not have a member representing them in the 2007 GP.

The inaugural IFL GP has been marred with injuries and contract disputes that of the original 20 fighters that were set to compete only 14 of them are still on the card with one entire tournament bracket being reduced to just one championship match (the Light Heavyweight division). At the same time 7 reserved fighters were even scratched off due to injuries.

Originally the GP was to determine champions in five weight classes, but the IFL announced on 11/13/07 that they will be crowning a sixth champion in the newly established featherweight division. No.1 seeded lightweight Wagnney Fabiano of the Toronto Dragons will drop out of the Lightweight GP and compete for the Featherweight title against Quad City Silverbacks L.C. Davis. Replacing Fabiano in the LW GP will be LW alternate Shad Lierley of the Seattle Tiger Sharks setting up the much anticipated rematch between Lierley and Chris Horodecki of the Los Angeles Anacondas.

== Featherweight Grand Prix ==
IFL Grand Prix Finals; December 29, 2007; Mohegan Sun Casino, Uncasaville, CT
Wagnney Fabiano (Toronto Dragons)	W
LC Davis (Quad City Silverbacks)	L

Wagnney Fabiano became the first IFL Featherweight Champion

== Lightweight Grand Prix ==
IFL Grand Prix First Round; November 3, 2007; Sears Centre, Chicago, Ill
Wagney Fabiano (Toronto Dragons)	W
John Gunderson (Nevada Lions)	L
Chris Horodecki (Los Angeles Anacondas)	W
Bart Palaszweski (Quad City Silverbacks)	L

IFL Grand Prix Finals; December 29, 2007; Mohegan Sun Casino, Uncasaville, CT
Ryan Schultz^{*} (Portland Wolfpack)	W TKO
Chris Horodecki

Alternate: Shad Lierley (Seattle Tiger Sharks)

^{*} Originally Shad Lierley was to face Horodecki but a toe injury during practice took him out of competition. It was then announced on 12/12/07 that John Gunderson will take Lierley's place. On 12/14/07 it was announced that unfortunately Gunderson also suffered an injury and now fighting Horodecki will be Wolfpack's Ryan Schultz.

Ryan Schultz became the first IFL lightweight Champion

== Welterweight Grand Prix ==
IFL Grand Prix First Round; November 3, 2007; Sears Centre, Chicago, Ill
Delson Heleno (New York Pitbulls)
Gideon Ray (Toronto Dragons)^{**}
Donnie Liles(San Jose Razorclaws)^{*}
Jay Hieron (Los Angeles Anacondas)

IFL Grand Prix Finals; December 29, 2007; Mohegan Sun Casino, Uncasaville, CT
Delson Heleno
Jay Hieron	TKO

Alternate: TBA

^{*} Originally Tokyo Sabres Antonio McKee was going to participate in the WW GP but due to his participation in another MMA promotion which was a violation of his IFL contract, McKee was removed from the GP and replaced by alternate Pat Healy. A week before the GP, the IFL announced that Healy suffered an elbow injury during training and could not participate in the IFL. Taking his place is San Jose Razorclaws Donnie Liles.

^{**} Originally Chicago Red Bears Mark Miller was going to participate in the WW GP but due to a hand injury he had to step out. Replacing him will be alternate Brad Blackburn. Shortly after the announcement of Blackburn replacing Miller, it was announced that Blackburn could not compete in the GP due to an undisclosed injury, to replace him will be Gideon Ray.

Jay Hieron became the IFL's first Welterweight Champion

== Middleweight Grand Prix ==
IFL Grand Prix First Round; November 3, 2007; Sears Centre, Chicago, Ill
Benji Radach (Los Angeles Anacondas)
Brent Beauparlant (Toronto Dragons)
Matt Horwich (Portland Wolfpack)
Brian Foster(San Jose Razorclaws)

IFL Grand Prix Finals; December 29, 2007; Mohegan Sun Casino, Uncasaville, CT
Benji Radach
Matt Horwich	TKO

Alternate: Fabio Leopoldo (New York Pitbulls)

Matt Horwich became the IFL's first Middleweight Champion.

== Light Heavyweight Grand Prix ==
IFL Grand Prix First Round; November 3, 2007; Sears Centre, Chicago, Ill
Vladimir Matsuyshenko (Tokyo Sabres)	W
Alex Schoenauer (Los Angeles Anacondas)^{*}	L

^{*}Originally Silverback Mike Ciesnolevicz was to participate in the LHW GP but due to his KO lost to Andre Gusmao during the IFL World Championship Finals he is under KO suspension and thus can not compete. Taking his place is the man who knocked him out New York Pittbulls Andre Gusmao. Unfortunately shortly after this announcement Gusmao suffered an injured foot and therefore could not compete in the GP. Meanwhile fellow LHW finalist Mike Whitehead did not sign a contract extension with the IFL and thus was not allowed to participate in the GP. At the same time reserve fighter Jamal Patterson was reported injured and could not participate in the GP, therefore the IFL decided to just make this a one fight tournament for the LHW belt between Matsuyshenko and Schoenauer.

Vladimer Matyushenko becomes the IFL's first Light Heavyweight Champion

== Heavyweight Grand Prix ==
IFL Grand Prix First Round; November 3, 2007; Sears Centre, Chicago, Ill
Bryan Vetell (New York Pitbulls)^{**}
Roy Nelson (Nevada Lions)
Antoine Jaoude (Southern California Condors)
Shane Ott (Tucson Scorpions)

IFL Grand Prix Finals; December 29, 2007; Mohegan Sun Casino, Uncasaville, CT
Roy Nelson	TKO
Antoine Jaoude

Alternate: TBA

^{**} Originally Ben Rothwell was to participate in the HW GP but due to Rothwell not signing a contract extension with the IFL he was not allowed to participate. Taking his place against Roy Nelson will be Reese Andy while reserve fighter Bryan Vetell will fight Antoine Jaoude. It was announced that Reese Andy could not compete in the GP due to injuries therefore Shane Ott will take his place and fight Antoine Joude while Roy Nelson will face Bryan Vetell.

Roy Nelson became the IFL's first Heavyweight Champion
