= 2006 International Fight League =

International Fight League MMA events in 2006

The inaugural season of the International Fight League (IFL) started in 2006 and was split into two halves.

== Season ==
=== First Season ===
The first half of the season consisted of two events and only four teams (New York Pitbulls, Los Angeles Anacondas, Quad City Silverbacks, and Seattle Tiger Sharks). The Pat Miletich lead Quad City Silverbacks won the first Championship event defeating the Maurice Smith led Seattle Tiger Sharks on June 3, 2006.

=== Second Season ===
The Second half of the 2006 season saw the addition of four new teams to the IFL (Toronto Dragons, Tokyo Sabres, Portland Wolfpack and San Jose Razorclaws). The championship event was held at the end of the year between defending champions, Quad City Silverbacks and newcomers Portland Wolfpack with the Silverbacks capturing their second consecutive team championship.

Each event in the 2006 season had at least one superfight along with the team format matches.

== Results ==
Date	Venue	Location	Team Matches	Superfight	Results
April 29, 2006	Trump Taj Mahal	Atlantic City, New Jersey	Quad City Silverbacks vs Los Angeles Anacondas; New York Pitbulls vs Seattle Tiger Sharks	Jens Pulver vs Cole Escovedo	Silverbacks def Anacondas 4-1; Tiger Sharks def Pitbulls 3-2; Pulver def Escovedo
June 3, 2006	Trump Taj Mahal	Atlantic City, New Jersey	Quad City Silverbacks vs Seattle Tiger Sharks	Daniel Gracie vs Wes Sims	Silverbacks def Tiger Sharks 4-1; Gracie def Sims
September 9, 2006	Rose Garden Arena	Portland, Oregon	Portland Wolfpack vs Seattle Tiger Sharks; Los Angeles Anacondas vs Tokyo Sabres	Matt Lindland vs Jeremy Horn	Wolfpack def Tiger Sharks 3-2; Anacondas def Sabres 5-0; Lindland def Horn
September 23, 2006	MARK of the Quad Cities	Moline, Illinois	Toronto Dragons vs San Jose Razorclaws; Quad City Silverbacks vs New York Pitbulls	Renzo Gracie vs Pat Miletich	Dragons def Razorclaws 3-2; Silverbacks def Pitbulls 3-2; Gracie def Miletich
November 2, 2006	Memorial Coliseum	Portland, Oregon	Portland Wolfpack vs Los Angeles Anacondas; Quad City Silverbacks vs Toronto Dragons	Allan Goes Vs Daniel Gracie; Mike Whitehead vs Mark Kerr	Wolfpack def Anacondas 3-2; Quad City Silverbacks def Toronto Dragons 4-1; Goes def Gracie; Whitehead def Kerr
December 29, 2006	Mohegan Sun Arena	Uncasville, Connecticut	Portland Wolfpack vs Quad City Silverbacks	Carlos Newton vs Renzo Gracie	Quad City Silverbacks def Portland Wolfpack 4-1; Gracie def Newton

== Events ==
=== IFL: Legends Championship 2006 ===
IFL: Legends Championship 2006
- Date: April 29, 2006
- Venue: Trump Taj Mahal
- City: Atlantic City, New Jersey

IFL: Legends Championship 2006 took place on April 29, 2006 at the Trump Taj Mahal in Atlantic City, New Jersey.

Results

Fight card
Weight class				Method	Round	Time	Notes
Heavyweight	Devin Cole	def.	Carlos Cline	Decision (unanimous)	3	4:00
Light Heavyweight	Jamal Patterson	def.	Matt Horwich	Submission (rear naked choke)	1	2:57
Welterweight	Dennis Hallman	def.	Delson Heleno	DQ (illegal kick)	1	3:59
Welterweight	Brad Blackburn	def.	Gustavo Machado	Decision (split)	3	4:00
Lightweight	Erik Owings	def.	Justin Jones	Submission (guillotine choke)	1	2:50
Lightweight	Jens Pulver	def.	Cole Escovedo	KO (punch)	1	0:56
Welterweight	Rory Markham	def.	Mike Pyle	KO (punch)	1	0:44
Middleweight	Ryan McGivern	def.	Amir Rahnavardi	Decision (unanimous)	3	4:00
Light Heavyweight	Alex Schoenauer	def.	Travis Wiuff	Submission (heel hook)	2	3:23
Heavyweight	Ben Rothwell	def.	Krzysztof Soszynski	TKO (punches)	1	3:59
Lightweight	Bart Palaszewski	def.	John Shackelford	TKO (punches)	2	1:31

=== IFL: Championship 2006 ===
IFL: Championship 2006
- Date: June 3, 2006
- Venue: Trump Taj Mahal
- City: Atlantic City, New Jersey

IFL: Championship 2006 took place on June 3, 2006 at the Trump Taj Mahal in Atlantic City, New Jersey.

Results

Fight card
Weight class				Method	Round	Time	Notes
Heavyweight	Devin Cole	def.	Travis Wiuff	Decision (unanimous)	3	4:00
Light Heavyweight	Reese Andy	def.	Mike Ciesnolevicz	Decision (split)	3	4:00
Middleweight	Ryan McGivern	def.	Dennis Hallman	Decision (unanimous)	3	4:00
Welterweight	Rory Markham	def.	Brad Blackburn	KO (punch)	2	0:23
Lightweight	Bart Palaszewski	def.	Steve Bruno	KO (punch)	1	1:48
Heavyweight	Daniel Gracie	def.	Wes Sims	Submission (rear naked choke)	1	2:42
Light Heavyweight	Jamal Patterson	def.	Alex Schoenauer	Submission (guillotine choke)	1	2:32
Welterweight	Jay Hieron	def.	Jake Ellenberger	Decision (unanimous)	3	4:00
Lightweight	Chris Horodecki	def.	Erik Owings	KO (head kick)	1	4:00
Welterweight	Ben Uker	def.	Travis Doerge	Submission (keylock)	1	2:10
