= 2007 International Fight League =

International Fight League MMA events in 2007

The first full season of the International Fight League (IFL) was composed of 11 events (9 normal events, 1 semi-final event and 1 final championship event). Over the span of nine events each of the 12 IFL teams competed in 3 events each and the top four teams with the best records advanced to the semi-final event. After the semi-final event the top two teams met in the Championship event which took place at the Los Angeles Forum. Each of the first 9 events also included at least one superfight. {www.ifl.tv}

Date	Venue	Location	Team Matches	Superfight	Results
January 19, 2007	Oracle Arena	Oakland, California	Seattle Tiger Sharks vs Southern California Condors; Nevada Lions Vs San Jose Razorclaws	Jeremy Horn vs Falaniko Vitale ^{1}	Condors def Tiger Sharks 3-2; Lions def Razorclaws 3-2; Horn def Vitale
February 2, 2007	Reliant Arena	Houston, Texas	Los Angeles Anacondas vs Quad City Silverbacks; Tokyo Sabres vs Tucson Scorpions	Carlos Newton vs Matt Lindland	Sabres def Scorpions 3-2; Anacondas def Silverbacks 3-2; Lindland def Newton
February 23, 2007	Gwinnett Center	Duluth, Georgia	Portland Wolfpack vs Toronto Dragons; Chicago Red Bears vs New York Pitbulls	Eduardo Pamplona vs Robbie Lawler	Wolfpack def Dragons 3-2; Pitbulls def Red Bears 4-1; Lawler def Pamplona
March 17, 2007	The Forum	Inglewood, California	Southern California Condors vs Tokyo Sabres; San Jose Razorclaws vs Los Angeles Anacondas	N/A^{2}	Sabres def Condors 3-2; Anacondas def Razorclaws 5-0
April 7, 2007	iWireless Center	Moline, Illinois	Nevada Lions vs Quad City Silverbacks; Seattle Tiger Sharks vs Chicago Red Bears	Jeff Curran Vs Kevin English	Silverbacks def Lions 4-1; Tiger Sharks def Red Bears 4-1; Curran def English
April 13, 2007	Mohegan Sun Arena	Uncasville, Connecticut	Tucson Scorpions vs Toronto Dragons; Portland Wolfpack vs New York Pitbulls	N/A	Dragons def Scorpions 4-1; Pitbulls def Wolfpack 3-2
May 19, 2007	Sears Centre	Hoffman Estates, Illinois	San Jose Razorclaws vs Southern California Condors; Quad City Silverbacks vs Chicago Red Bears	Maurice Smith Vs Marco Ruas	Condors def Razorclaws 3-2; Silverbacks def Red Bears 3-2; Smith def Ruas
June 1, 2007	Everett Events Center	Everett, Washington	Tokyo Sabres vs Portland Wolfpack; Los Angeles Anacondas vs Seattle Tiger Sharks	N/A	Sabres def Wolfpack 3-2; Anacondas def Tiger Sharks 3-2
June 16, 2007	Las Vegas Hilton	Las Vegas, Nevada	Toronto Dragons vs New York Pitbulls; Tucson Scorpions vs Nevada Lions	N/A	Pitbulls def. Dragons 3-2; Lions def. Scorpions 4-1
August 2, 2007	Continental Airlines Arena	East Rutherford, New Jersey	Los Angeles Anacondas vs Quad City Silverbacks; Tokyo Sabres vs New York Pitbulls	N/A	Silverbacks def. Anacondas 4-1; Pitbulls def. Sabres 3-2
September 20, 2007	Seminole Hard Rock Hotel	Hollywood, Florida	Championship Final; Quad City Silverbacks vs New York Pitbulls	TBD	Pitbulls def. Silverbacks 3-2

^{1} Originally Ivan Salaverry was supposed to partake in the superfight but along with an IFL agreement he had a contract with the now defunct WFA. After the UFC bought out the WFA Salaverry's contract was put up into limbo preventing him from participating in the superfight.

^{2} Originally the superfight was to be between IFL coaches Maurice Smith and Marco Ruas but during training Ruas injured himself cancelling this fight. It has now been rescheduled for the May 19th show.
