= Ryan Schultz =

American mixed martial arts fighter (born 1977)

- Born: Ryan James Schultz; July 4, 1977 (age 49); North Platte, Nebraska, U.S.
- Other names: The Lion
- Height: 5 ft 10 in (1.78 m)
- Weight: 145 lb (66 kg; 10.4 st)
- Division: Lightweight; Featherweight
- Fighting out of: Portland, Oregon
- Team: Team Quest
- Rank: Black belt in Brazilian jiu-jitsu under Fabiano Scherner
- Years active: 2003–2013

Mixed martial arts record
- Total: 38
- Wins: 23
- By knockout: 12
- By submission: 4
- By decision: 7
- Losses: 14
- By knockout: 10
- By submission: 3
- By decision: 1
- Draws: 1

Other information
- Mixed martial arts record from Sherdog

Ryan James Schultz (born July 4, 1977) is an American mixed martial artist. A professional from 2003 to 2013, he has competed in the WEC, IFL, and Japan's World Victory Road. He was the last International Fight League Lightweight Champion, competing for Matt Lindland's Portland Wolfpack.

== Biography ==
Schultz was born and raised in North Platte, Nebraska. He was a member of his high school wrestling team, graduating in 1996. Schultz has a degree in criminal justice from the University of Nebraska–Lincoln, where he continued to compete in wrestling, coached by Matt Lindland. After graduation, Ryan worked as an apprentice plumber in Colorado, before embarking on his MMA career. Schultz is a member of Team Quest, training with his former wrestling coach and former UFC veteran Matt Lindland.

== Mixed martial arts career ==
=== Early career ===
Schultz was entered into his first MMA fight by a friend. The fight took place at Dan Severn's promotion Dangerzone, in April 2004, in North Dakota. Schultz had not trained at all for the fight, but won by KO, after just 45 seconds. A few days after the fight, Lindland asked Schultz to join Team Quest, an offer which Schultz accepted. Over the next three years, Schultz competed in 20 fights in various promotions, including the WEC, Hawaiian promotion SuperBrawl, Absolute Fighting Championship, and SportFight - a promotion founded by Matt Lindland and Randy Couture.

On June 18, 2004, Schultz won an eight-man lightweight tournament, at SuperBrawl 36 in Hawaii. Schultz won his first fight that night, against Mike Aina, by a split decision. In the semi-final fight, Schultz submitted Deshaun Johnson by a rear-naked choke in the first round. In the finals, Schultz defeated Roger Huerta, who verbally submitted due to a dislocated jaw.

=== International Fight League ===
Ryan Schultz entered the IFL promotion as a member of the Portland Wolfpack team, with a record of 13–7–1. He defeated Cam Ward by TKO in his first fight in the promotion, but lost to Los Angeles Anacondas' Chris Horodecki in his second fight, two months later. In his third fight, on December 29, 2006, he faced Quad Cities Silverbacks' future UFC veteran Bart Palaszewski. Schultz dominated the first and second round of the fight, but got caught by Palaszewski's right hand in the third round, and lost by KO. The match was awarded "Fight of the Night" honors.

After winning his next three bouts in the IFL, Schultz was selected to replace John Gunderson (himself a replacement for Shad Lierley) in a fight against Chris Horodecki for the IFL lightweight championship. In the bout, which took place at the IFL: World Grand Prix Finals, Schultz was able to avenged his first loss to Horodecki in the IFL. Schultz pinned Horodecki's right hand early in the first round, continued to pound him until the referee stepped in at 2:51 of the first round, and was crowned the first IFL Lightweight Champion.

Before the IFL promotion folded, Schultz successfully defended his title twice, defeating John Gunderson and Deividas Taurosevicius, both by unanimous decision.

=== World Victory Road - Sengoku ===
In July 2008, Schultz agreed to a five event deal with the Japanese promotion Sengoku. In his first fight for the promotion, at Sengoku IV, Schultz lost to Mizuto Hirota, by KO in the second round. Schultz faced Jorge Masvidal in his next fight, which took place less than a month after Sengoku IV. Masvidal was able to knockdown Schultz in the first round, and finished him by TKO using strikes on his grounded opponent.

== Personal life ==
Ryan married his high school sweetheart and together they have a son. Ryan and his family live in Fort Collins, Colorado. Schultz and fellow MMA fighter Ed Herman own and operate "Trials Martial Arts and Fitness Gym" in Northern Colorado. The gym offers high level mixed martial arts training.

Ryan is featured in the mixed martial arts documentary Fight Life, released in 2013, the film is directed by independent filmmaker James Z. Feng and produced by RiLL Films.

== Championships and accomplishments ==
- International Fight League
  - IFL Lightweight Championship (One time; First; Last)

== Mixed martial arts record ==
Professional record breakdown
38 matches	23 wins	14 losses
By knockout	12	10
By submission	4	3
By decision	7	1
Draws	1	

Res.	Record	Opponent	Method	Event	Date	Round	Time	Location	Notes
Loss	23–14–1	Anselmo Luna	TKO (punches)	Prize Fighting Championship 3	September 20, 2013	2	3:05	Midland, Texas United States	
Loss	23–13–1	Scott Cleve	KO (punches)	SCL: Rise of the King	December 8, 2012	1	3:04	Denver, Colorado United States	
Win	23–12–1	Billy Martin	Submission (rear-naked choke)	MFP: Resurrection	June 30, 2012	1	2:49	Casper, Wyoming United States	
Win	22–12–1	Angelo Duarte	Submission (rear-naked choke)	ROF 42	December 17, 2011	1	2:37	Broomfield, Colorado United States	Featherweight debut.
Loss	21–12–1	Kazunori Yokota	KO (punches)	World Victory Road Presents: Sengoku 10	September 23, 2009	1	2:37	Saitama, Japan	
Loss	21–11–1	Jorge Masvidal	TKO (punches)	World Victory Road Presents: Sengoku 5	September 28, 2008	1	1:57	Tokyo, Japan	
Loss	21–10–1	Mizuto Hirota	KO (superman punch)	World Victory Road Presents: Sengoku 4	August 24, 2008	2	4:25	Saitama, Japan	
Win	21–9–1	Deividas Taurosevicius	Decision (unanimous)	IFL: Connecticut	May 16, 2008	5	4:00	Uncasville, Connecticut, United States	Defended the IFL Lightweight Championship.
Win	20–9–1	John Gunderson	Decision (unanimous)	IFL: Las Vegas	February 29, 2008	5	4:00	Las Vegas, Nevada, United States	Defended the IFL Lightweight Championship.
Win	19–9–1	Chris Horodecki	TKO (punches)	IFL: World Grand Prix Finals	December 29, 2007	1	2:51	Uncasville, Connecticut, United States	Won the inaugural IFL Lightweight Championship.
Win	18–9–1	Aaron Riley	Decision (unanimous)	IFL: 2007 Team Championship Final	September 20, 2007	3	4:00	Hollywood, Florida, United States	
Win	17–9–1	Savant Young	Decision (unanimous)	IFL: Everett	June 1, 2007	3	4:00	Everett, Washington, United States	
Win	16–9–1	Joe Sampieri	Decision (unanimous)	IFL: Connecticut	April 13, 2007	3	4:00	Uncasville, Connecticut, United States	
Loss	15–9–1	Bart Palaszewski	KO (punch)	IFL: Championship Final	December 29, 2006	3	2:16	Uncasville, Connecticut, United States	
Loss	15–8–1	Chris Horodecki	TKO (head kick and punches)	IFL: World Championship Semifinals	November 2, 2006	2	0:24	Uncasville, Connecticut, United States	
Win	15–7–1	Cam Ward	TKO (punches)	IFL: Portland	September 9, 2006	2	2:38	Portland, Oregon, United States	
Loss	14–7–1	Hermes França	KO (punches)	AFC 16: Absolute Fighting Championships 16	April 22, 2006	1	3:30	Boca Raton, Florida, United States	
Win	14–6–1	Dave Cochran	Submission (rear-naked choke)	SF 15: Tribute	April 8, 2006	1	3:42	Portland, Oregon, United States	
Loss	13–6–1	Kuniyoshi Hironaka	Submission (armbar)	MARS: MARS	February 4, 2006	2	1:40	Tokyo, Japan	
Loss	13–5–1	Rich Clementi	Submission (armbar)	AFC 14: Absolute Fighting Championships 14	December 10, 2005	1	3:39	Fort Lauderdale, Florida, United States	
Loss	13–4–1	David Gardner	Submission (broken rib)	FFC 15: Fiesta Las Vegas	September 14, 2005	1	1:00	Las Vegas, Nevada, United States	
Draw	13–3–1	Gesias Cavalcante	Draw	SF 11: Rumble at the Rose Garden	July 9, 2005	3	5:00	Portland, Oregon, United States	
Win	13–3	Hiroyuki Abe	TKO (punches)	Euphoria: USA vs World	February 26, 2005	2	0:42	Atlantic City, New Jersey, United States	
Loss	12–3	Keith Wilson	Decision (unanimous)	SF 8: Justice	January 8, 2005	3	5:00	Gresham, Oregon, United States	
Win	12–2	David Gaona	TKO (punches)	Euphoria: Road to the Titles	October 15, 2004	1	2:17	Atlantic City, New Jersey, United States	
Win	11–2	Jason Dent	TKO (punches)	APEX: Genesis	September 5, 2004	1	2:00	Montreal, Quebec, Canada	
Win	10–2	Roger Huerta	TKO (jaw injury)	SB 36: SuperBrawl 36	June 18, 2004	1	1:47	Honolulu, Hawaii, United States	
Win	9–2	Deshaun Johnson	Submission (rear-naked choke)	SB 36: SuperBrawl 36	June 18, 2004	1	2:55	Honolulu, Hawaii, United States	
Win	8–2	Mike Aina	Decision (split)	SB 36: SuperBrawl 36	June 18, 2004	3	3:00	Honolulu, Hawaii, United States	
Win	7–2	Gil Castillo	Decision (majority)	WEC 10	May 21, 2004	3	5:00	Lemoore, California, United States	
Loss	6–2	Ronald Jhun	TKO (corner stoppage)	ROTR 5: Rumble on the Rock 5	May 7, 2004	2	5:00	Honolulu, Hawaii, United States	
Win	6–1	Nick Gilardi	KO (punches)	DB 10: DesertBrawl 10	April 3, 2004	1	N/A	Bend, Oregon, United States	
Win	5–1	Eddy Ellis	KO (punch)	SF 1: Revolution	February 21, 2004	1	1:53	Portland, Oregon, United States	
Win	4–1	Hank Weis	TKO (submission to punches)	KC 8: Kickdown Classic 8	January 17, 2004	1	2:17	Denver, Colorado, United States	
Win	3–1	Jeremy Saunders	TKO (punches)	URC 6: Ultimate Ring Challenge 6	October 25, 2003	1	0:46	Longview, Washington, United States	
Win	2–1	Hannibal Adofo	KO (punch)	WEC 8	October 17, 2003	1	0:25	Lemoore, California, United States	
Loss	1–1	JT Taylor	KO (punches)	WEC 7	August 9, 2003	2	1:56	Lemoore, California, United States	
Win	1–0	Jon Henderson	TKO (punches)	Dangerzone: Dakota Destruction	April 12, 2003	1	0:45	New Town, North Dakota, United States	

== See also ==
- List of male mixed martial artists

New championship	1st IFL Lightweight Champion; December 29, 2007 - July 31, 2008	promotion folded
