= Mike Whitehead =

American mixed martial arts fighter (born 1981)

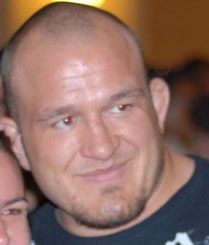
- Born: June 29, 1981 (age 45); Medford, Oregon, US
- Other names: Iron Mike
- Height: 6 ft 1 in (1.85 m)
- Weight: 261 lb (118 kg; 18.6 st)
- Division: Heavyweight; Light Heavyweight
- Reach: 74.0 in (188 cm)
- Fighting out of: Las Vegas, Nevada, US
- Team: Wand Fight Team
- Years active: 2000–2012

Mixed martial arts record
- Total: 35
- Wins: 27
- By knockout: 9
- By submission: 12
- By decision: 6
- Losses: 8
- By knockout: 4
- By decision: 4

Other information
- Mixed martial arts record from Sherdog

Michael Joe Whitehead (born June 29, 1981) is a former professional mixed martial artist. He competed in the Light Heavyweight and Heavyweight weight classes for the Ultimate Fighting Championship, IFL, Affliction, and Strikeforce.

== Career ==
Mike Whitehead started wrestling at North Idaho College, Southern Oregon University, and the University of Missouri. He is a 3 time All American Wrestler and Abu Dhabi qualifier. In 2005, he participated in the reality series The Ultimate Fighter 2 on Spike TV.

He has also competed in the standup only fight organization Xtreme Fighting Association where he defeated Ethen Cox by unanimous decision.

== Personal life ==
In 2010, Whitehead was arrested by the police after a case of sexual assault was reported. Further drug related charges were considered after marijuana plants were found in his residence. In 2012, he made an Alford plea and was sentenced to 1–4 years in prison, paid $2,400 in restitution, and was registered as a sex offender for attempted sexual assault. He was jailed for three years.

== Championships and accomplishments ==
- Icon Sport
  - SuperBrawl 24: Return of the Heavyweights Tournament Runner Up

== Mixed martial arts record ==
Professional record breakdown
35 matches	27 wins	8 losses
By knockout	9	4
By submission	12	0
By decision	6	4

Res.	Record	Opponent	Method	Event	Date	Round	Time	Location	Notes
Loss	27–8	Brian Heden	Decision (unanimous)	Dakota FC / Ultimate Productions: Winter Brawl	December 5, 2015	3	5:00	Fargo, North Dakota, United States	
Win	27–7	Jojo Thompson	Submission (neck crank)	RITC: Rage in the Cage 156	October 22, 2011	1	1:58	Chandler, Arizona, United States	
Win	26–7	Eddie Sanchez	Decision (split)	PFC: Pure Fighting Championships 6	December 10, 2010	3	5:00	Red Deer, Alberta, Canada	
Win	25–7	Chase Gormley	TKO (punches)	IFC: Extreme Challenge	July 10, 2010	4	2:22	Mt. Pleasant, Michigan, United States	Won the IFC Heavyweight Championship.
Loss	24–7	Muhammed Lawal	KO (punches)	Strikeforce: Evolution	December 19, 2009	1	3:08	San Jose, California, United States	
Win	24–6	Kevin Randleman	Decision (unanimous)	Strikeforce: Lawler vs. Shields	June 6, 2009	3	5:00	St. Louis, Missouri, United States	Light heavyweight bout.
Win	23–6	Leo Pla	Submission (guillotine choke)	M-1 Challenge 8: USA	October 29, 2008	1	1:20	Kansas City, Missouri, United States	
Loss	22–6	Renato Sobral	Decision (unanimous)	Affliction: Banned	July 19, 2008	3	5:00	Anaheim, California, United States	
Win	22–5	Zak Jensen	Submission (armbar)	Beatdown: 4 Bears Casino	May 10, 2008	1	2:06	North Dakota, United States	
Win	21–5	Soakai Pulu	Submission (keylock)	Throwdown Showdown 1: Showdown	April 18, 2008	1	0:59	Orem, Utah, United States	
Win	20–5	Daniel Sarafian	Decision (unanimous)	PFP: Ring Of Fire	December 9, 2007	3	5:00	Manila, Philippines	
Win	19–5	Vernon White	TKO (punches)	IFL: Las Vegas	June 16, 2007	2	0:54	Las Vegas, Nevada, United States	
Win	18–5	Wojtek Kaszowski	TKO (punches)	IFL: Connecticut	April 13, 2007	1	2:43	Uncasville, Connecticut, United States	
Win	17–5	Krzysztof Soszynski	Decision (unanimous)	IFL: World Championship Final	December 29, 2006	3	4:00	Uncasville, Connecticut, United States	
Win	16–5	Mark Kerr	TKO (punches)	IFL: World Championship Semifinals	November 2, 2006	1	2:40	Portland, Oregon, United States	
Win	15–5	Michael Buchkovich	TKO (submission to punches)	CFC2: Combat Fighting Championship	September 23, 2006	1	4:04	Orlando, Florida, United States	
Win	14–5	Ruben Villareal	Submission (keylock)	Valor Fighting: Showdown At Cache Creek II	September 15, 2006	1	1:02	Brooks, California, United States	
Win	13–5	Rich Beecroft	Submission (keylock)	RITC 85: Xtreme Cage Fighting	August 5, 2006	1	1:17	Phoenix, Arizona, United States	
Win	12–5	Rocky Batastini	Submission (kimura)	RITC 83: Rampage	June 10, 2006	1	0:14	Arizona, United States	
Win	11–5	Mike Bourke	TKO (retirement)	UAGF: Kaos on the Kampus	May 20, 2006	3	N/A	Los Angeles, California, United States	
Win	10–5	Robert Beraun	Submission (kimura)	RITC 80: Fight Night at The Fort	March 18, 2006	1	2:57	Fountain Hills, Arizona, United States	
Loss	9–5	Keith Jardine	Decision (unanimous)	UFC 57	February 4, 2006	3	5:00	Las Vegas, Nevada, United States	
Win	9–4	Travis Fulton	Submission (bulldog choke)	EC 61: Extreme Challenge 61	April 22, 2005	1	1:30	Osceola, Iowa, United States	
Win	8–4	Aaron Brink	Decision (unanimous)	UAGF: Clover Combat	March 25, 2005	3	5:00	California, United States	
Win	7–4	Matt Bear	TKO (submission to strikes)	VFC 9: Madness	March 5, 2005	2	0:54	Council Bluffs, Iowa, United States	
Loss	6–4	Brandon Vera	TKO (doctor stoppage)	WEC 13: Heavyweight Explosion	January 22, 2005	2	1:12	Lemoore, California, United States	
Win	6–3	Terrell Dees	Submission (neck crank)	WEC 13: Heavyweight Explosion	January 22, 2005	1	3:43	Lemoore, California, United States	
Win	5–3	Demian Decorah	TKO (punches)	EC 59: Extreme Challenge 59	September 24, 2004	1	3:25	Medina, Minnesota, United States	
Win	4–3	Brian Stromberg	Submission	SF 5: Stadium	August 28, 2004	2	N/A	Gresham, Oregon, United States	
Win	3–3	Karl Knothe	Submission (neck crank)	EC 58: Extreme Challenge 58	June 11, 2004	1	1:17	Medina, Minnesota, United States	
Loss	2–3	Alex Paz	Decision (split)	HOOKnSHOOT: Absolute Fighting Championships 2	March 28, 2003	2	5:00	Fort Lauderdale, Florida, United States	
Loss	2–2	Tim Sylvia	TKO (knee and punches)	SB 24: Return of the Heavyweights 2	April 27, 2002	1	2:38	Honolulu, Hawaii, United States	SuperBrawl Return of the Heavyweights Finals.
Win	2–1	Ben Rothwell	Decision (unanimous)	SB 24: Return of the Heavyweights 2	April 27, 2002	2	5:00	Honolulu, Hawaii, United States	SuperBrawl Return of the Heavyweights Semifinals.
Loss	1–1	Tim Sylvia	TKO (punches)	SB 24: Return of the Heavyweights 1	April 26, 2002	1	3:46	Honolulu, Hawaii, United States	SuperBrawl Return of the Heavyweights Quarterfinals.
Win	1–0	Kim Bower	TKO (punches)	GVT: Gladiators Vale Tudo	March 10, 2001	1	N/A	Worley, Idaho, United States	

== Kickboxing record ==
Kickboxing record
1 win (0 KOs), 0 losses, 0 draws
Date	Result	Opponent	Event	Location	Method	Round	Time	Record
2008-03-22	Win	(United States) Ethen Cox	XFA 1	Las Vegas, Nevada, USA	Decision (unanimous)	3	3:00	1-0
Legend: Win Loss Draw/No contest Notes
