= Shawn Tompkins =

Canadian mixed martial arts fighter

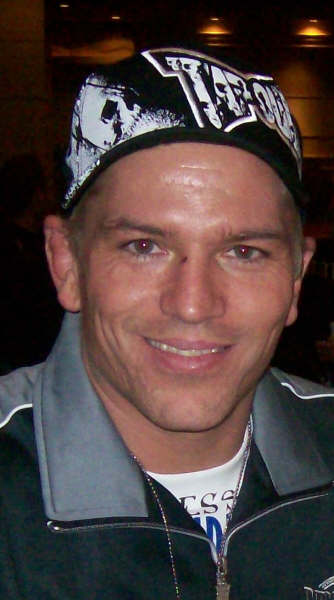
- Born: March 16, 1974; Tillsonburg, Ontario, Canada
- Died: August 14, 2011 (aged 37); Ingersoll, Ontario, Canada
- Height: 5 ft 10 in (1.78 m)
- Weight: 185 lb (84 kg; 13.2 st)
- Division: Middleweight
- Team: Tapout Training Center; Team Tompkins; Xtreme Couture
- Rank: 3rd Degree Black Belt in Shotokan Karate
- Years active: 2000–2001 (MMA)

Mixed martial arts record
- Total: 4
- Wins: 0
- Losses: 4
- By knockout: 4

Other information
- Notable students: Vitor Belfort, Forrest Griffin, Mark Hominick, Chris Horodecki, Martin Kampmann, Ray Sefo, Wanderlei Silva, Sam Stout
- Mixed martial arts record from Sherdog

Shawn Tompkins (March 16, 1974 – August 14, 2011) was a Canadian kickboxer and mixed martial artist, and later trainer. At the time of his death, he was an instructor at the Tapout Training Center. He formerly coached the Los Angeles Anacondas of the International Fight League.

== Biography and career ==
Tompkins began studying Shotokan karate at the age of six, and went to be a two-time Canadian National Karate Champion and a third degree black belt in the discipline. He began kickboxing at sixteen years old and competed in 47 matches, holding Canadian, North American and South American titles.

At the age of eighteen, he opened his first training facility in Ontario, Canada. He later relocated to Las Vegas, Nevada in the United States in August 2007 and worked as the head striking coach at Xtreme Couture Mixed Martial Arts before joining the Tapout Training Center in October 2009. He was also the coach for the Los Angeles Anacondas of the International Fight League, officially taking the reins from Bas Rutten as the head coach on March 17, 2007, just before their matchup against the San Jose Razorclaws.

Tompkins taught such notable fighters as Vitor Belfort, Mark Hominick, Chris Horodecki, Wanderlei Silva and Sam Stout.

On November 30, 2011, at the Pearl at the Palms Casino Resort in Las Vegas during the 2011 World MMA Awards Results, Tompkins was posthumously awarded the Lifetime Achievement Award.

== Personal life ==
Tompkins was married to Emilie Stout, the sister of fellow fighter, Sam Stout. On Sunday, August 14, 2011, Tompkins died unexpectedly, of a sudden heart attack, in his sleep at the age of 37.

== Gym history ==
The gym's predecessor Team Tompkins MMA System was founded in 2001 by MMA trainer Shawn Tompkins coach of the Los Angeles Anacondas of the International Fight League. During his time as head coach he trained the future of Adrenaline's talent as well as being involved with Xtreme Couture Mixed Martial Arts and the Tapout Training Center in Las Vegas, Nevada. The gym saw great success during this time with Team Tompkins holding two belts in TKO/UCC at Lightweight and Featherweight, with a combined total of 11 title defenses between Mark Hominick(7) and Sam Stout(4). During this period Chris Horodecki made it to the finals of the IFL World Grand Prix to challenge for the IFL Lightweight title. "The Coach" corned Mark Hominick in the gyms first UFC title challenge against Jose Aldo at UFC 129 on April 30, 2011, for the inaugural UFC Featherweight Championship.

Tompkins died on August 14, 2011 from a heart attack. He remains as an influential figure and an inspiration to members of the gym. From December 6, 2011, onward members of the gym were consistently involved in a Toronto based Anti-bullying campaign.

=== Adrenaline MMA Training & Fitness ===
The gym in its current form emerged in 2012, founded by three of Tompkins' star pupils Mark Hominick, Sam Stout, and Chris Horodecki, who went about training the next generation of mixed martial artists out of the newly rebranded Adrenaline MMA Training & Fitness. During this period, Adrenaline talent Chad Laprise embarked on an 7 fight win streak to earn himself a spot on the UFC's reality TV show The Ultimate Fighter. He would go on to win the season's tournament and received bonus awards for Fight of the Season and Performance of the Season. In 2013, Jesse Ronson won the Aggression FC Lightweight Championship and Malcolm Gordon won the HFC Flyweight Championship in 2014. That same year, Adrenaline moved its facility to a new location in London, Ontario. The facility extends over two floors and 11,000 square feet. In 2015, Chris Horodecki challenged Lance Palmer for the World Series of Fighting Featherweight Championship. The gym also began offering female only jujitsu lessons which became popular. In 2016 Malcolm Gordon won the WXC Flyweight Championship and defended it once. 2017-2018 saw the gym hold 3 Championships in TKO Major League MMA. Jesse Ronson won both the TKO Lightweight and Welterweight Championships, and Malcolm Gordon won the TKO Flyweight Championship, defending it twice. Both Ronson and Gordan were invited to join the UFC in 2020.

== Mixed martial arts record ==
Professional record breakdown
4 matches	0 wins	4 losses
By knockout	0	4

Res.	Record	Opponent	Method	Event	Date	Round	Time	Location	Notes
Loss	0–4	Joel Leblanc	TKO (punches)	UCC 6 - Redemption	October 19, 2001	1	2:38	Montreal, Quebec, Canada	
Loss	0–3	David Loiseau	TKO (punches)	UCC 4 - Return Of The Super Strikers	May 12, 2001	1	1:26	Sherbrooke, Quebec, Canada	
Loss	0–2	Steve Vigneault	TKO (punches)	UCC 2 - The Moment of Truth	August 12, 2000	1	2:43	Montreal, Quebec, Canada	
Loss	0–1	Matt Rocca	TKO (punches)	UCC 1 - The New Beginning	June 2, 2000	1	8:50	Montreal, Quebec, Canada	
