= Quad Cities Silverbacks =

MMA team

Quad City Silverbacks

The Quad Cities Silverbacks was an International Fight League team based in the Quad Cities region of the United States. Coached by former UFC Welterweight Champion and founder of the very successful Miletich Fighting Systems camp, Pat Miletich, the Silverbacks were one of four teams competing in the IFL's inaugural season.

The Silverbacks are two time IFL World Team Champions. In the 2007 season the Silverbacks suffered their first lost (to the LA Anacondas) and had to struggle to get the final spot in the 2007 playoffs. After defeating the Anacondas in the semi-finals the Silverbacks were defeated by the New York Pitbulls in the 2007 finals.

== Record/Roster ==
The Silverbacks are 33-17 as of September 2007 in team competition. (All records are IFL fights only).

^{a}= fought as an alternate bout, that does not go towards team record

^{o}= fought as an opening bout, that does not go towards team record

^{GP}= fought during the individual Grand Prix, that does not go towards team record

=== Current fighters as of 2007 season ===
- Bart Palaszewski (8-3) (LW)

def. John Shackelford by TKO in the 2nd round (4/29/06)

def Steve Bruno by KO in the first round (6/03/06)

def Marcio Feitosa by decision (split) (9/23/06)

def Ivan Menjivar by decision (split) (11/02/06)

def Ryan Schultz by KO in the third round (12/29/06) (Clinched IFL World Team Championship)

lost to Chris Horodecki by decision (split) (02/02/07)

def John Gunderson by decision (split) (04/07/07)

def John Strawn by KO (punch) in the first round (05/19/07)

def Harris Sarmiento by submission (guillotine choke) in the third round (08/02/07)

lost to Deividas Taurosevicius by submission (armbar) in the second round (09/20/07)

lost to Chris Horodecki by decision (split) (11/03/07)^{GP}

- LC Davis (2-1) (LW) ALTERNATE

def Jay Estrada by submission (guillotine choke) in the second round (05/19/07)^{o}

def Conor Heun by decision (unanimous) (08/02/07)^{o}

lost to Wagney Fabiano by submission (armbar) in the first round (12/29/07)^{GP}

- Rory Markham (6-2) (WW)

def Mike Pyle by KO in the first round (4/29/06)

def Brad Blackburn by KO in the second round (6/03/06)

def Marcelo Azevedo by TKO in the first round (9/23/06)

def Keith Wisniewski by TKO (corner stoppage) in the third round (11/02/06)

lost to Chris Wilson by TKO (ref stoppage) in the first round (12/29/06)

was supposed to face Jay Hieron on 2/02/07 but underwent eye surgery, alternate Victor Moreno fought instead

def Pat Healy by TKO in the third round (04/07/07)

was supposed to face Mark Miller on 5/19/07 but was injured during training, alternate Josh Neer fought instead

def Chris Clements by TKO (strikes) in the first round (08/02/07)

was supposed to face Delson Heleno in the IFL Finals but suffered an injury from his last fight, thus alternate Jake Ellenberger fought instead

lost to Brett Cooper by TKO (strikes) in the second round (12/29/07)^{GP}

- Josh Neer (0-1) (WW) ALTERNATE

lost to Mark Miller by KO in the first round (05/19/07)

- Victor Moreno (0-1) (WW) ALTERNATE

lost to Jay Hieron by submission (rear naked choke) in the first round (02/02/07)

- Jake Ellenberger (0-1) (WW) ALTERNATE

lost to Deleson Heleno by submission (armbar) in the second round (09/20/07)

- Ryan McGivern (5-4) (MW)

def. Amir Rahnavardi by unanimous decision (4/29/06)

def Dennis Hallman by unanimous decision (6/03/06)

lost to Fabio Leopoldo by submission in the second round (9/23/06)

lost to Joe Doerksen by submission (rear naked choke) in the first round (11/02/06)

def Matt Horwhich by unanimous decision (12/29/06)

lost to Benji Radach by TKO (strikes) in the second round (02/02/07)

def Daniel Molina by unanimous decision (04/07/07)

lost to Tim Kennedy by submission (guillotine choke) in the second round (05/19/07)

was supposed to face Benji Radach in the IFL 2007 semi finals but was on his honeymoon, thus Gerald Harris who normally fights for the Portland Wolfpack fought instead

def Fabio Leopoldo by TKO in the second round (09/20/07)

- Luke Johnson (0-1) (MW) ALTERNATE

lost to Rick Reeves by submission in the first round (04/07/07)^{a}

- Mike Ciesnolevicz (5-3) (LHW)

lost to Reese Andy by split decision (6/03/06)

lost to Andre Gusmão by TKO in the second round (9/23/06)

def Brent Beauparlant by submission (guillotine choke) in the first round (11/02/06)

def Aaron Stark by TKO (guillotine choke/ref stoppage) in the third round (12/29/06)

def Alex Schoenauer by decision (split) (02/02/07)

was supposed to face Vernon "Tiger" White on 4/07/07 but suffered a broken nose from his bout with Schoenauer. Thus alternate Sam Hoger fought instead.

def Adam Maciejewski by TKO (strikes) in the second round (05/19/07)

def Alex Schoenauer by decision (split) (08/02/07)

lost to Andre Gusmão by KO in the first round (09/20/07)

- Sam Hoger (0-1) (LHW) ALTERNATE

lost to Vernon White by submission (rear naked choke) in the second round (04/07/07)

=== Former fighters ===
- Ben Uker (1-2) (WW) (ALTERNATE)

def Travis Doerge by submission (Americana) in the first round (6/03/06)^{a}

lost to Delson Heleno by TKO in the first round (9/23/06)^{a}

lost to Jake Ellenberger by TKO (referee stoppage) in the second round (12/29/06)^{a}

- Travis Wiuff (0-2) (LHW)

lost to Alex Schoenauer by submission (heel hook) in the 2nd round (4/29/06)

lost to Devin Cole by unanimous decision (6/03/06) (fought as HW)

Left to join San Jose Razorclaws

- Ben Rothwell (9-0) (HW)

def Krysztof Soszynski by TKO in the first round (4/29/06)

def Bryan Vetell by KO in the first round (9/23/06)

def Wojtek Kaszowski by submission (Americana) in the first round (11/02/06)

def Devin Cole by KO in the first round (12/29/06)

def Matt Thompson by TKO (strikes) (02/02/07)

def Roy Nelson by split decision (04/07/07)

def Travis Fulton by submission (kimura) in the second round (05/19/07)

def Krysztof Soszynski by TKO (strikes) in the first round (08/02/07)

def Ricco Rodriguez by decision (unanimous) (09/20/07)

left due to contract dispute

== 2006 Season Schedule/ Results ==
Date	Round	Opponent	Result
April 29, 2006	First Round	Los Angeles Anacondas	W 4-1
June 3, 2006	Championship Final	Seattle Tiger Sharks	W 4-1
September 23, 2006	First Round	New York Pitbulls	W 3-2
November 2, 2006	Semi Final	Toronto Dragons	W 4-1
December 29, 2006	Championship Final	Portland Wolfpack	W 4-1

== 2007 Season Schedule/ Results ==
Date	Opponent	Result
February 02, 2007	Los Angeles Anacondas	L 2-3
April 07, 2007	Nevada Lions	W 4-1
May 19, 2007	Chicago Red Bears	W 3-2

== 2007 Playoffs Schedule/ Results ==
Date	Opponent	Round	Result
August 2, 2007	Los Angeles Anacondas	Semi-Final	W 4-1
September 20, 2007	New York Pitbulls	Final	L 2-3
