= Portland Wolfpack =

MMA team

Portland Wolfpack

The Portland Wolfpack were a team in the now-defunct International Fight League and based in Portland, Oregon. The Wolfpack were coached by Olympic silver medalist in Greco Roman Wrestling, Matt Lindland. The Wolfpack were established in the middle of the 2006 season. In their debut season the Wolfpack made it to the 2006 IFL Championship Final but were defeated by the Quad City Silverbacks 1-4. The Wolfpack were associated with the MMA training camp Team Quest based out of Gresham, Oregon.

Even though the Wolfpack sent only two fighters into the 2007 GP (one being a last minute replacement) they walked away with two championship titles; the lightweight title and the middleweight title.

Along with Lindland, the Wolfpack were also coached by former IFL fighter Dennis Hallman, the first man to defeat UFC legend Matt Hughes twice.

== Record/Roster ==
The Wolfpack are 14-26 as of June 2007 in team competition.

Records only involve IFL fights.

^{*}= Fought as Intraleague superfight, does not go towards team record.

^{a}= Fought as an alternate bout, does not go towards team record.

^{1}= fought at LHW and when Horwhich was a member of the Seattle Tiger Sharks

^{2}= fought when Cole was a member of the Seattle Tiger Sharks

^{3}= fought when George was a member of the Tokyo Sabres

^{4}= fought when Harris was an alternate for the Quad City Silverbacks during the 2007 IFL Semi Finals

^{GP}= fought during the individual Grand Prix, does not go towards team record

CURRENT FIGHTERS AS OF 2007 SEASON

=== IFL Lightweight Champion ===
- Ryan Schultz (5-2) (LW)

def Cam Ward by TKO in the second round (9/09/06)

lost to Chris Horodecki by TKO (strikes) in the second round (11/02/06)

lost to Bart Palaszewski by KO in the second round (12/29/06)

On 2/23/07 Ryan Schultz was supposed to face Wagney Fabiano but due to him losing by KO to Palaszewski, Schultz was under a KO suspension and could not participate in the fight. Instead alternate Ian Loveland will fight instead

def Joe Sampieri by decision (unanimous) (4/13/07)

def Savant Young by decision (unanimous) (06/01/07)

def Aaron Riley by decision (unanimous) (09/20/07)^{*}

def Chris Horodecki by TKO (strikes) in the first round to win the Lightweight Championship(12/29/07)^{GP}

- Zach George (1-1) (LW) ALTERNATE

def Danny Suarez by decision (unanimous) (03/17/07)^{a3}

lost to Deividas Taurosevicius by submission (arm triangle choke) in the first round (4/13/07)^{a}

- Ian Loveland (0-2) (LW) (ALTERNATE)

lost to Wagney Fabiano by submission (slide choke) in the first round (2/23/07)

lost to Jason Palacios by submission (rear naked choke) in the first round (06/01/07)^{a}

- Jake Ellenberger (1-1) (WW) (ALTERNATE)

lost to Jay Hieron by unanimous decision (06/03/06)^{*}

def Ben Uker by TKO (ref stoppage) in the second round (12/29/06)^{a}

- Mike Dolce (1-3) (WW)

def Jim Abrille by TKO (strikes) in the first round (2/23/07)

lost to Delson Heleno by decision (unanimous) (4/13/07)

lost to Antonio McKee by decision (unanimous) (06/01/07)

lost to Lyman Good by decision (unanimous) (08/02/07)^{*}

- Gerald Harris (0-2) (MW)

lost to Fabio Leopoldo by decision (split) (4/13/07)

lost to Benji Radach by TKO (strikes) in the first round (08/02/07)^{4}

=== IFL Middleweight Champion ===
- Matt Horwich (6-3) (MW)

lost to Jamal Patterson by submission (rear naked choke) (04/29/06)^{1}

def Bristol Marunde by unanimous decision (9/09/06)

def Mike Pyle by submission (rear naked choke) in the second round (11/02/06)

lost to Ryan McGivern by unanimous decision (12/29/06)

def Brent Beauparlant by submission (kimura) in the second round (2/23/07)

lost to Jamal Patterson by submission (guillotine choke) in the first round (4/13/07) fought as LHW

def Kaz Hamanaka by KO (kick) in the first round (06/01/07)

def Brian Foster by submission (armbar) in the first round (11/03/07)^{GP}

def Benji Radach by TKO (strikes) in the second round to win the Middleweight Championship (12/29/07)^{GP}

- Aaron Stark (2-2) (LHW)

def Reese Andy by TKO in the third round (9/09/06)

def Alex Schoenauer by submission (modified guillotine choke) in the second round (11/02/06)

lost to Mike Ciesnolevicz by TKO (guillotine choke/ref stoppage) in the third round (12/29/06)

Aaron Stark was supposed to face Wojtek Kaszowski on 2/23/07 but suffered a rib injury. Thus alternate John Krohn will fight instead.

Aaron Stark was supposed to face Jamal Patterson on 4/13/07 but was still suffering from his injury, thus fellow member Matt Horwich gained weight to fight in his place

lost to Vladimir Matyushenko by TKO (strikes) in the first round (06/01/07)

- John Krohn (1-0) (LHW) (ALTERNATE)

def Wojtek Kaszwoski by decision (unanimous) (2/23/07)

- Devin Cole (3-5) (HW)

def Carlos Cline by unanimous decision (4/29/06)^{2}

def Travis Wiuff by unanimous decision (6/03/06)^{2}

lost to Allan Goes by submission (guillotine choke) in the first round (9/09/06)

lost to Krysztof Soszynski by submission (armbar) in the second round (11/02/06)

lost to Ben Rothwell by KO in the first round (12/29/06)

lost to Rafael Feijao by TKO (ref stoppage) in the second round (2/23/07)

def Bryan Vetell by KO (strikes) in the first round (4/13/07)

lost to Orville Palmer by decision (split) (06/01/07)

Former fighters

- Chris Wilson (2–1) (WW)
  - lost to Brad Blackburn by unanimous decision (9/09/06)
  - def Jay Hieron by decision (unanimous) (11/02/06)
  - def Rory Markham by TKO (ref stoppage) in the first round (12/29/06)
  - Left the IFL TO pursue other MMA INTERESTS

== 2006 Season Schedule/ Results ==
Date	Round	Opponent	Result
September 09, 2006	First Round	Seattle Tiger Sharks	W 3-2
November 02, 2006	Semi Final	Los Angeles Anacondas	W 3-2
December 29, 2006	Championship Final	Quad City Silverbacks	L 1-4

== 2007 Season Schedule/ Results ==
Date	Opponent	Result
February 23, 2007	Toronto Dragons	W 3-2
April 13, 2007	New York Pitbulls	L 2-3
June 01, 2007	Tokyo Sabres	L 2-3
