= Mike Pyle (fighter) =

American mixed martial arts fighter

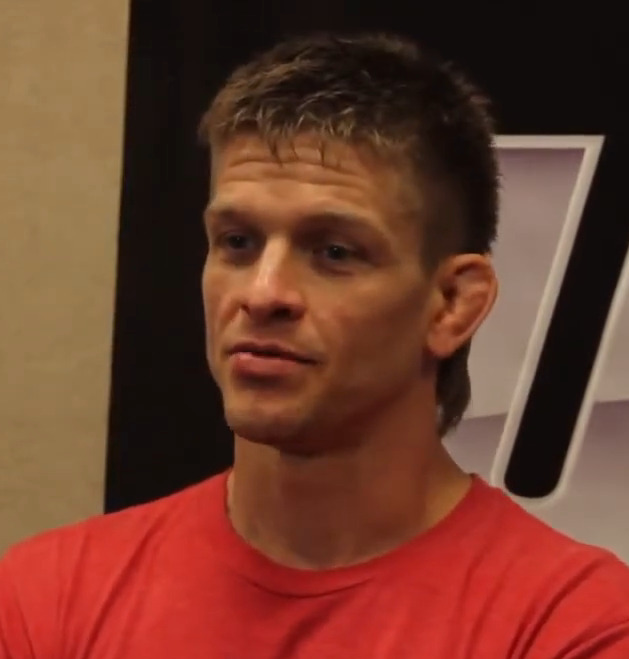
- Born: Michael Wayne Pyle; September 18, 1975 (age 51); Dresden, Tennessee, United States
- Other names: Quicksand
- Nationality: American
- Height: 6 ft 1 in (1.85 m)
- Weight: 170 lb (77 kg; 12 st 2 lb)
- Division: Light Heavyweight; Middleweight; Welterweight
- Reach: 74.0 in (188 cm)
- Fighting out of: Las Vegas, Nevada, United States
- Team: Syndicate MMA
- Rank: Black belt in Brazilian Jiu-Jitsu
- Years active: 1999–2018

Mixed martial arts record
- Total: 42
- Wins: 27
- By knockout: 7
- By submission: 16
- By decision: 4
- Losses: 14
- By knockout: 8
- By submission: 4
- By decision: 2
- Draws: 1

Other information
- Website: http://www.mikepyle.tv/
- Mixed martial arts record from Sherdog

Michael Wayne Pyle (born September 18, 1975) is a retired American professional mixed martial artist who competed in the welterweight division of the UFC. A professional competitor since 1999, Pyle is a former WEC Welterweight Champion, and has also competed in Strikeforce, Elite XC, Affliction, M-1 Global, and for the Los Angeles Anacondas of the IFL.

== Background ==
Pyle was born and raised in Dresden, Tennessee until the age of 17 when he moved to Birmingham, Alabama. It was there that he began studying Taekwondo. One of his training partners told him, "Man you gotta check out this cage fighter stuff they got going on. There's this guy who lays on the ground and breaks peoples arms ..." The cage fighting they were talking about was the UFC. The man they were talking about was Royce Gracie, the masterful practitioner of the martial arts discipline known as Brazilian jiu-jitsu who won the tournaments at UFC 1, UFC 2 and UFC 4. Pyle created a gym in a 13 x 15-foot shed behind his mother's home in Dresden, searching for any instructional videos for Brazilian jiu-jitsu he could get his hands on as well attending seminars put together by the Gracie family, whenever they were close enough for him to make the drive. Despite having no formal Brazilian jiu-jitsu training, Pyle would go on to be a successful submission grappler in mixed martial arts, the large majority of his wins coming by submission.

== Mixed martial arts career ==
=== Early career ===
Pyle's first sanctioned amateur MMA fight was in 1999 against future UFC Light Heavyweight Champion Quinton Jackson. The bout was on ISCF MMA & IKF Kickboxing Promoter Jeff Mullen's November 13 event at the New Daisey Theatre in Memphis, Tennessee, (Jackson's hometown). Pyle and Jackson were to be the Main Event and was supposed to be for the ISCF Amateur Mid-South Regional Middleweight Title. However, Jackson weighed in 25 lbs heavy (200 lb.) for the title so technically, Pyle (175 lb.) won by forfeit. But this could not keep these two from going for it in the ring. The young Pyle, who tried various different submissions during the fight, was thrown and slammed several times, at one point being actually throw out of the ring by the future PRIDE veteran. In the end, Jackson won by unanimous decision but Pyle, who had also fought with two broken fingers, felt that he had won and was quick to ask for a rematch. From this fight, Pyle learned that "just jiu-jitsu wasn't going to be able to cut it."

=== World Extreme Cagefighting ===
On October 14, 2005, Pyle became the WEC Welterweight Champion by defeating Bret Bergmark. He successfully defended the title against veteran Shonie Carter on January 13, 2006. He defeated Carter by triangle choke submission in the first round.

Pyle then left the WEC for the IFL and was stripped of the title in December 2006.

=== The IFL and Affliction ===
Pyle fought three times in the IFL fights as a member of Bas Rutten’s Los Angeles Anacondas. He also fought for Elite XC, Strikeforce, and he was featured on the preliminary card of the first event co-promoted by Affliction Clothing and Adrenaline MMA: Affliction: Banned.

=== Ultimate Fighting Championship ===
Pyle then signed with the UFC as a replacement for Chris Wilson, fighting Brock Larson at UFC 98. Pyle took the fight on just one week's notice. Pyle lost in the first round via arm-triangle choke.

Next, he fought and defeated Wilson at UFC Fight Night: Diaz vs. Guillard by submission due to a guillotine choke in the third round.

Pyle was defeated by Jake Ellenberger via second round TKO on January 2, 2010 at UFC 108.

Pyle defeated Jesse Lennox at UFC 115 on June 12, 2010. Pyle largely controlled the bout and won via technical submission, when his opponent passed out in a triangle choke late in the third round.

Pyle gave John Hathaway his first professional MMA loss via unanimous decision on October 16, 2010 at UFC 120, replacing an injured Dong Hyun Kim. He controlled the fight for all three rounds, out-striking and out-grappling Hathaway, even going as far as putting Hathaway in a modified crucifix-triangle choke hold and raining down unanswered strikes.

Pyle faced Ricardo Almeida on March 19, 2011 at UFC 128. Pyle won the fight via unanimous decision (29-28, 29-28, 29-28).

Pyle next faced Rory MacDonald on August 6, 2011 at UFC 133. He lost the fight via TKO in the first round.

Pyle was expected to face Paulo Thiago on January 14, 2012 at UFC 142. However, Thiago was forced out of the bout with an injury and replaced by Ricardo Funch. Pyle won the bout via TKO in the first round.

Pyle faced Josh Neer on June 8, 2012 at UFC on FX 3. Pyle defeated Neer via first round KO, earning Knockout of the Night honors.

Pyle was then matched up against James Head on December 15, 2012 at The Ultimate Fighter: Team Carwin vs. Team Nelson Finale. He won the fight via TKO in the first round.

Pyle was expected to face Gunnar Nelson on May 25, 2013 at UFC 160. However, Nelson pulled out of the bout citing an injury and was replaced by Rick Story. Although he got knocked down in the end of the first round, Pyle withstood Story's attack and recovered in the second round, coming close to submitting his opponent with a kimura. In the third round Pyle came on strong, landing numerous knees and elbows and hurting Story. Pyle won the fight via split decision.

Pyle next faced Matt Brown on August 17, 2013 at UFC Fight Night 26. Brown defeated Pyle via first round knockout.

Pyle faced TJ Waldburger on February 22, 2014 at UFC 170. He won via TKO in the third round, after hurting Waldburger with two elbows and a knee.

Pyle was expected to face Demian Maia on August 23, 2014 at UFC Fight Night 49. However, Maia pulled out of the fight with an injury and was replaced by Jordan Mein. He lost the fight via TKO in the first round.

Pyle was expected to face Sean Spencer on May 23, 2015 at UFC 187. However, on April 23, Spencer pulled out of the fight with an undisclosed injury and was replaced by Colby Covington. Pyle lost the fight via unanimous decision.

The bout with Spencer was rescheduled and eventually took place on February 6, 2016 at UFC Fight Night 82. Pyle won the back-and-forth fight via TKO in the third round, after landing a spinning elbow and following up with punches, elbows and knees. Pyle was also awarded his first Fight of the Night bonus award.

Pyle next faced Alberto Mina on July 7, 2016 at UFC Fight Night 90. He lost the fight via knockout in the second round.

Pyle faced Alex Garcia on December 30, 2016 at UFC 207. He lost the fight by knockout in the first round.

Pyle faced Zak Ottow on March 3, 2018 at UFC 222. He lost the fight via TKO in the first round. Pyle retired from MMA competition after this fight.

== Personal life ==
Pyle and his girlfriend were married in October 2009.

Pyle played the role of Capt. Kevin Burke in the movie Universal Soldier: Regeneration starring Jean-Claude Van Damme, Dolph Lundgren and fellow MMA fighter Andrei Arlovski.

Pyle played a small part in the 2012 blockbuster Men In Black III starring Will Smith and Tommy Lee Jones.

After the retirement from competition, Pyle has been working as an assistant coach at his long-time team Syndicate MMA in Las Vegas.

== Championships and accomplishments ==
- Ultimate Fighting Championship
  - Fight of the Night (One time)
  - Knockout of the Night (One time)
  - UFC.com Awards
    - 2010: Ranked #7 Upset of the Year vs. John Hathaway
    - 2012: Ranked #8 Fighter of the Year & Ranked #9 Knockout of the Year vs. Josh Neer
- World Extreme Cagefighting
  - WEC Welterweight Championship (One time)
    - One successful title defense
- Viking Fight
  - Viking Fight Middleweight Championship (One time)

== Mixed martial arts record ==
Professional record breakdown
42 matches	27 wins	14 losses
By knockout	7	8
By submission	16	4
By decision	4	2
Draws	1	

Res.	Record	Opponent	Method	Event	Date	Round	Time	Location	Notes
Loss	27–14–1	Zak Ottow	TKO (punches)	UFC 222	March 3, 2018	1	2:34	Las Vegas, Nevada, United States	
Loss	27–13–1	Alex Garcia	KO (punch)	UFC 207	December 30, 2016	1	3:34	Las Vegas, Nevada, United States	
Loss	27–12–1	Alberto Mina	KO (flying knee and punches)	UFC Fight Night: dos Anjos vs. Alvarez	July 7, 2016	2	1:17	Las Vegas, Nevada, United States	
Win	27–11–1	Sean Spencer	TKO (elbows and knees)	UFC Fight Night: Hendricks vs. Thompson	February 6, 2016	3	4:25	Las Vegas, Nevada, United States	Fight of the Night.
Loss	26–11–1	Colby Covington	Decision (unanimous)	UFC 187	May 23, 2015	3	5:00	Las Vegas, Nevada, United States	
Loss	26–10–1	Jordan Mein	TKO (punches)	UFC Fight Night: Henderson vs. dos Anjos	August 23, 2014	1	1:12	Tulsa, Oklahoma, United States	
Win	26–9–1	TJ Waldburger	TKO (elbows and punches)	UFC 170	February 22, 2014	3	4:03	Las Vegas, Nevada, United States	
Loss	25–9–1	Matt Brown	KO (punches)	UFC Fight Night: Shogun vs. Sonnen	August 17, 2013	1	0:29	Boston, Massachusetts, United States	
Win	25–8–1	Rick Story	Decision (split)	UFC 160	May 25, 2013	3	5:00	Las Vegas, Nevada, United States	
Win	24–8–1	James Head	TKO (knee and punches)	The Ultimate Fighter: Team Carwin vs. Team Nelson Finale	December 15, 2012	1	1:55	Las Vegas, Nevada, United States	
Win	23–8–1	Josh Neer	KO (punch)	UFC on FX: Johnson vs. McCall	June 8, 2012	1	4:56	Sunrise, Florida, United States	Knockout of the Night.
Win	22–8–1	Ricardo Funch	TKO (knee and punches)	UFC 142	January 14, 2012	1	1:22	Rio de Janeiro, Brazil	
Loss	21–8–1	Rory MacDonald	TKO (punches)	UFC 133	August 6, 2011	1	3:54	Philadelphia, Pennsylvania, United States	
Win	21–7–1	Ricardo Almeida	Decision (unanimous)	UFC 128	March 19, 2011	3	5:00	Newark, New Jersey, United States	
Win	20–7–1	John Hathaway	Decision (unanimous)	UFC 120	October 16, 2010	3	5:00	London, England	
Win	19–7–1	Jesse Lennox	Technical Submission (triangle choke)	UFC 115	June 12, 2010	3	4:44	Vancouver, British Columbia, Canada	
Loss	18–7–1	Jake Ellenberger	TKO (punches)	UFC 108	January 2, 2010	2	0:22	Las Vegas, Nevada, United States	
Win	18–6–1	Chris Wilson	Submission (guillotine choke)	UFC Fight Night: Diaz vs. Guillard	September 16, 2009	3	2:15	Oklahoma City, Oklahoma, United States	
Loss	17–6–1	Brock Larson	Submission (arm-triangle choke)	UFC 98	May 23, 2009	1	3:06	Las Vegas, Nevada, United States	Catchweight (172 lb) bout; Pyle missed weight.
Win	17–5–1	Brian Gassaway	Submission (armbar)	SuperFights MMA: Night of Combat 2	October 11, 2008	1	4:21	Las Vegas, Nevada, United States	
Win	16–5–1	J.J. Ambrose	Submission (rear-naked choke)	Affliction: Banned	July 19, 2008	1	2:51	Anaheim, California, United States	
Win	15–5–1	Dan Hornbuckle	Submission (triangle choke)	World Victory Road Presents: Sengoku 2	May 18, 2008	1	4:52	Tokyo, Japan	
Win	14–5–1	Damir Mirenic	Submission (kimura)	HCF: Destiny	February 1, 2008	2	1:24	Calgary, Alberta, Canada	
Loss	13–5–1	Jake Shields	Submission (rear-naked choke)	EliteXC: Renegade	November 10, 2007	1	3:39	Corpus Christi, Texas, United States	
Win	13–4–1	Aaron Wetherspoon	Decision (unanimous)	Strikeforce: Shamrock vs. Baroni	June 22, 2007	3	5:00	San Jose, California, United States	
Win	12–4–1	Ross Ebañez	Submission (rear-naked choke)	EliteXC: Destiny	February 10, 2007	1	1:55	Southaven, Mississippi, United States	
Loss	11–4–1	Matt Horwich	Submission (rear-naked choke)	IFL: World Championship Semifinals	November 2, 2006	2	1:02	Portland, Oregon, United States	Middleweight bout.
Win	11–3–1	John Cole	Technical Submission (guillotine choke)	IFL: Portland	September 9, 2006	1	0:17	Portland, Oregon, United States	Middleweight bout.
Loss	10–3–1	Rory Markham	KO (punch)	IFL: Legends Championship 2006	April 29, 2006	1	0:44	Atlantic City, New Jersey, United States	
Win	10–2–1	Gustavo Machado	TKO (punches)	GFC: Team Gracie vs. Team Hammer House	March 3, 2006	1	1:20	Columbus, Ohio, United States	
Win	9–2–1	Shonie Carter	Submission (triangle choke)	WEC 18	January 13, 2006	1	2:06	Lemoore, California, United States	Defended the WEC Welterweight Championship.
Win	8–2–1	Bret Bergmark	Submission (triangle choke)	WEC 17	October 14, 2005	1	3:36	Lemoore, California, United States	Won the vacant WEC Welterweight Championship.
Win	7–2–1	Tony Sanza	Submission (rear-naked choke)	SportFight 12	September 16, 2005	1	1:06	Portland, Oregon, United States	
Win	6–2–1	Damian Hatch	Submission (rear-naked choke)	SportFight 10	May 28, 2005	1	2:07	Gresham, Oregon, United States	Welterweight debut.
Win	5–2–1	Patrick Suhl	KO (punches)	Viking Fight 5	May 2, 2004	1	1:31	Copenhagen, Denmark	Won the Viking Fight Middleweight Championship.
Win	4–2–1	Petras Markevicius	Submission (triangle choke)	Viking Fight 5	May 2, 2004	2	0:55	Copenhagen, Denmark	
Win	3–2–1	Arschak Dahabagian	Submission (triangle choke)	Viking Fight 4	February 1, 2004	2	3:39	Copenhagen, Denmark	
Loss	2–2–1	Valdas Pocevicius	Submission (guillotine choke)	Shooto	November 14, 2003	1	3:37	Vilnius, Lithuania	
Draw	2–1–1	Andrei Semenov	Draw	M-1 MFC: Russia vs. the World 5	April 6, 2003	1	10:00	St. Petersburg, Russia	Middleweight debut; special rules bout. Non-stoppage resulted in draw.
Win	2–1	Daan Kooiman	Submission (rear-naked choke)	Viking Fight 3	February 15, 2003	1	0:49	Aarhus, Denmark	
Win	1–1	Jon Fitch	Submission (rear-naked choke)	Revolution Fighting Championship 1	July 13, 2002	1	2:35	Las Vegas, Nevada, United States	Light Heavyweight debut.
Loss	0–1	Quinton Jackson	Decision (unanimous)	ISCF: Memphis	November 13, 1999	3	5:00	Memphis, Tennessee, United States	Catchweight (205 lbs) bout; Pyle weighted in at 175 lbs.

== See also ==
- List of WEC champions
- List of current UFC fighters
- List of male mixed martial artists

Vacant Title last held by Karo Parisyan	4th WEC Welterweight Champion; October 14, 2005 – December 11, 2006	Vacant Pyle signs with IFL Title next held by Carlos Condit
