= Jake Ellenberger =

American mixed martial arts fighter

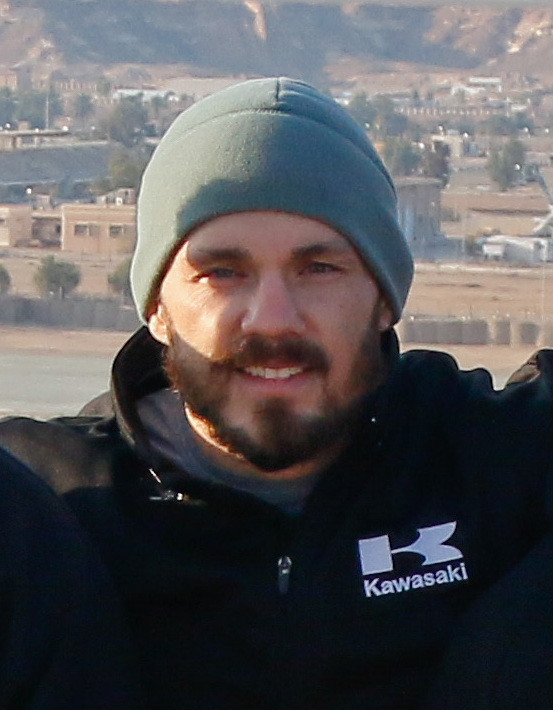
- Ellenberger at 2018 MMA Holiday Tour at Al Asad Air Base, Iraq
- Born: Jake Ellenberger; March 28, 1985 (age 41); Omaha, Nebraska, U.S.
- Other names: The Juggernaut
- Height: 5 ft 9 in (175 cm)
- Weight: 170 lb (77 kg; 12 st)
- Division: Welterweight
- Reach: 71 in (180 cm)
- Fighting out of: Lake Forest, California, U.S.
- Team: Kings MMA; Gracie Jiu-Jitsu Academy; Glendale Fighting Club
- Rank: Purple belt in Brazilian Jiu-Jitsu under Rodrigo Vaghi
- Wrestling: NCAA Division II Wrestling
- Years active: 2005–2018

Mixed martial arts record
- Total: 46
- Wins: 31
- By knockout: 21
- By submission: 4
- By decision: 6
- Losses: 15
- By knockout: 7
- By submission: 2
- By decision: 6

Other information
- University: University of Nebraska at Kearney
- Mixed martial arts record from Sherdog
- Last updated on: July 20, 2013

Jake Ellenberger (born March 28, 1985) is an American retired mixed martial artist and former United States Marine who was known for competing in the Ultimate Fighting Championship (UFC). A professional competitor from 2005–2018, Ellenberger has also formerly competed for the Quad Cities Silverbacks of the IFL, Bodog Fight, and King of the Cage.

== Background ==
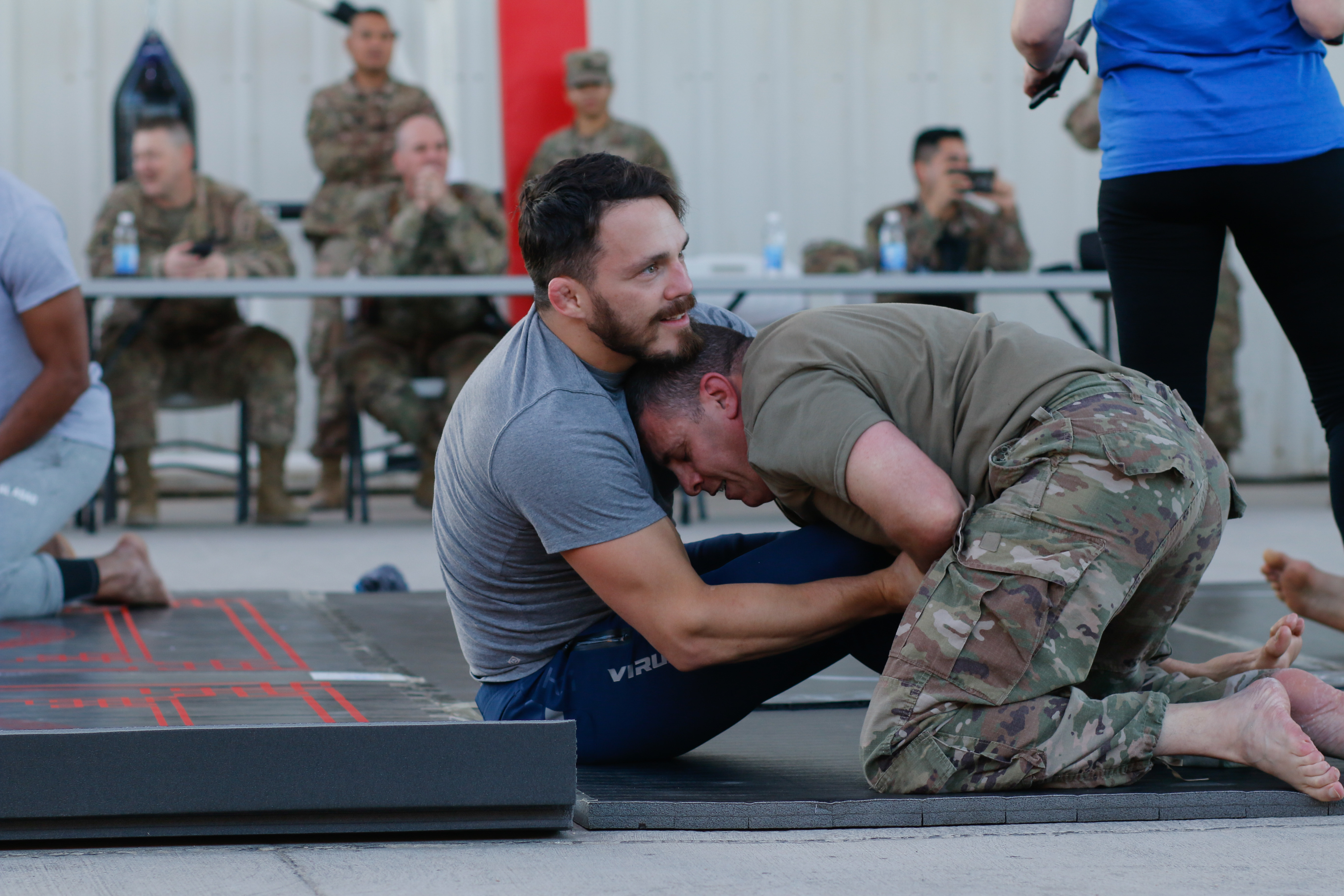
Ellenberger, left, grapples with Lt. Col. Andrew Heymann at Al Asad Air Base, Iraq, during the MMA Holiday Tour across the Middle East, 2018.

Jake Ellenberger was born in Omaha, Nebraska. Jake's father was an iron worker, and his twin brother named Joe was also an MMA fighter. After starting his career with a 10–0 record, Joe was diagnosed with an extremely rare blood disease called Paroxysmal nocturnal hemoglobinuria when he was 24 years old. Some estimates suggest that roughly half of the people diagnosed with PNH die within 10 years of their diagnosis. Joe still cornered his brother's fights and is a huge inspiration for Jake. Both Jake and Joe were very athletic growing up; Jake was on the swimming and diving team at Millard South High School, while Joe wrestled and played football. Joe won a Nebraska wrestling state title his senior year. Joe then went on to wrestle at the University of Nebraska-Kearney and became a two-time NCAA Division II All-American, finishing third in the country twice and was a three-time academic All-American.

Jake began training for MMA when he saw his friend fight for the welterweight title in the Victory Fighting Championships. He studied psychology at the University of Nebraska-Omaha for three years and was on the school's NCAA Division II wrestling team. Following the end of his own wrestling career and acting as assistant coach, Jake helped his alma mater to win back to back National titles. Jake Ellenberger is also a former Marine, having served as a heavy equipment mechanic (military occupational specialty 1341).

== Mixed martial arts career ==
=== International Fight League ===
Ellenberger suffered the first loss of his career by unanimous decision to Jay Hieron in his IFL debut. In Ellenberger's second IFL appearance, he defeated Ben Uker by TKO in the second round at IFL: Championship Final. Ellenberger filled in on short notice for an injured Rory Markham and represented Pat Miletich's Quad City Silverbacks at the 2007 Team Championship Final. He suffered his only submission loss to Brazilian jiu-jitsu black belt Delson Heleno. In his last fight for the promotion, Ellenberger dominated his opponent, Pat Healy over three rounds to win a unanimous decision at IFL: Las Vegas.

=== BodogFight ===
At the event entitled Clash of the Nations, held in St. Petersburg, Russia, Ellenberger lost a unanimous decision to UFC veteran Derrick Noble. He then traveled to Costa Rica and defeated another UFC veteran, Zach Light, via TKO at Costa Rica Combat. In his last appearance with BodogFight, Ellenberger knocked out Jose Landi-Jons in just nine seconds.

=== M-1 Challenge ===
Ellenberger represented the United States at M-1 Challenges in Japan and South Korea. In his first bout held in Japan, Ellenberger defeated Frenchman Farouk Lakebir by unanimous decision. In his next fight, held in Korea, Ellenberger defeated Doo Won Seo via TKO in round two.

=== Bellator ===
Ellenberger won his fight against Marcelo Alfaya at Bellator 11 by knockout just 42 seconds into the first round.

=== Ultimate Fighting Championship ===
Ellenberger stepped in on short notice for an injured Chris Lytle and lost a split decision in his promotional debut at UFC Fight Night 19 against Carlos Condit.

Ellenberger rebounded by defeating Mike Pyle via second-round TKO on January 2, 2010, at UFC 108.

Ellenberger was set to face Ben Saunders at UFC 111 in Newark, New Jersey as a replacement for the injured Martin Kampmann; however, once Jon Fitch's original opponent, Thiago Alves, was forced out due to a brain irregularity, Saunders requested and was granted a fight against Fitch instead. Due to the last minute switch, Ellenberger was still paid win and show money.

Ellenberger defeated John Howard via third-round TKO at UFC Live: Jones vs. Matyushenko. Ellenberger caused Howard's left eye to close after repeatedly landing short elbows and punches from the closed guard.

Ellenberger was expected to face Jon Fitch on February 5, 2011, at UFC 126, but Fitch was pulled from the bout in favor with a matchup with B.J. Penn at UFC 127. Ellenberger instead faced the then-undefeated Carlos Eduardo Rocha at UFC 126 and won the fight via split decision.

Ellenberger faced Sean Pierson on April 30, 2011, at UFC 129, replacing an injured Brian Foster, and won the fight via first-round KO on 17 days notice.

Ellenberger faced Jake Shields on September 17, 2011, at UFC Fight Night 25. He won the fight via TKO only 53 seconds into the first round. The finish earned him a $55,000 Knockout of the Night award.

A bout between Ellenberger and Diego Sanchez was briefly linked to UFC 141. However, a lingering hand injury ended up keeping Sanchez out of action until February 2012.

The Ellenberger/Sanchez bout took place on February 15, 2012, at UFC on Fuel TV 1 Ellenberger defeated Sanchez via unanimous decision, in a bout that earned both fighters Fight of the Night honors.

Ellenberger lost to Martin Kampmann via second-round KO (knees) on June 1, 2012, at The Ultimate Fighter 15 Finale.

Ellenberger was expected to face Josh Koscheck on September 1, 2012, at UFC 151. However, Koscheck pulled out of the bout citing a back injury and was replaced by returning UFC veteran Jay Hieron. Hieron gave Ellenberger his first loss six years earlier. After the UFC 151 event was cancelled, Ellenberger/Hieron took place on October 5, 2012, at UFC on FX 5. Ellenberger won the fight via unanimous decision (29-28, 29–28, 29–28).

Ellenberger was expected to face Johny Hendricks on March 16, 2013, UFC 158. However, Hendricks was pulled from the Ellenberger bout in favor of a matchup with Carlos Condit at the event after Condit's original opponent Rory MacDonald, pulled out of the bout with an injury. Ellenberger instead faced returning veteran Nate Marquardt. Ellenberger defeated Marquardt via spectacular first-round knockout. The win also garnered him his second Knockout of the Night bonus.

Ellenberger faced Rory MacDonald on July 27, 2013, at UFC on Fox 8. MacDonald was able to use his size and reach advantage to repeatedly land his jab, neutralizing the shorter Ellenberger, resulting in a unanimous decision victory. UFC president Dana White criticized the performance as "lackluster".

Ellenberger was expected to face Tarec Saffiedine on January 4, 2014, at UFC Fight Night 34. However, in late November, Ellenberger pulled out of the bout citing a hamstring injury and was replaced by Hyun Gyu Lim.

On April 9, 2014, Ellenberger revealed that he had signed an eight-fight contract with UFC with disclosed title clauses should he be a champion in the future.

The bout with Saffiedine was rebooked for UFC 172. However, on March 28, 2014, Saffiedine pulled out of the fight with an undisclosed injury. Ellenberger instead faced Robbie Lawler at UFC 173 on May 24, 2014. He lost the fight via TKO in the third round due to a combination of a knee and punches.

Ellenberger next faced Kelvin Gastelum on November 15, 2014, at UFC 180. He lost the fight via submission in the first round.

Ellenberger faced Josh Koscheck on February 28, 2015, at UFC 184. Ellenberger won the fight via submission in the second round, his first submission victory in nine years. It also earned Ellenberger a Performance of the Night bonus.

Ellenberger faced Stephen Thompson on July 12, 2015, at The Ultimate Fighter 21 Finale. He lost the fight via KO due to a spinning hook kick and punches in the first round.

Ellenberger faced Tarec Saffiedine on January 30, 2016, at UFC on Fox 18. He lost the fight by unanimous decision.

Ellenberger faced Matt Brown on July 30, 2016, at UFC 201. He won the fight by TKO in the first round and also picked up a Performance of the Night bonus.

Ellenberger faced Jorge Masvidal on December 3, 2016, at The Ultimate Fighter 24 Finale. He lost the fight by TKO in the first round after his foot became entangled in the fence, rendering him unable to defend himself from Masvidal's strikes.

Ellenberger faced Mike Perry on April 22, 2017, at UFC Fight Night: Swanson vs. Lobov. He lost the fight via KO (elbow) in the second round.

Ellenberger was expected to face Bryan Barberena on June 1, 2018, at UFC Fight Night 131. However, on March 23, 2018, Barberena pulled out due to injury. He will be replaced by Ben Saunders. Ellenberger lost by TKO after being dropped by knee to the body in the first round.

The pairing with Barberena was rescheduled and took place on August 25, 2018, at UFC Fight Night 135. Ellenberger lost the fight by TKO in the first round and subsequently announced his retirement from Mixed Martial Arts.

== Championships and accomplishments ==
=== Mixed martial arts ===
- Ultimate Fighting Championship
  - Fight of the Night (One time) vs. Diego Sanchez
  - Performance of the Night (Two times) vs. Josh Koscheck and Matt Brown
  - Knockout of the Night (Two times) vs. Jake Shields and Nate Marquardt
  - Tied (Matt Brown & Stephen Thompson) for third most knockdowns landed in UFC Welterweight division history (11)
  - UFC.com Awards
    - 2009: Ranked #4 Loss of the Year vs. Carlos Condit & Ranked #5 Fight of the Year vs. Carlos Condit
- Sherdog
  - 2011 All-Violence Second Team
- Fight Matrix
  - 2005 Rookie of the Year

== Mixed martial arts record ==
Professional record breakdown
46 matches	31 wins	15 losses
By knockout	21	7
By submission	4	2
By decision	6	6

Res.	Record	Opponent	Method	Event	Date	Round	Time	Location	Notes
Loss	31–15	Bryan Barberena	TKO (punches)	UFC Fight Night: Gaethje vs. Vick	August 25, 2018	1	2:26	Lincoln, Nebraska, United States	
Loss	31–14	Ben Saunders	KO (knee to the body)	UFC Fight Night: Rivera vs. Moraes	June 1, 2018	1	1:56	Utica, New York, United States	
Loss	31–13	Mike Perry	KO (elbow)	UFC Fight Night: Swanson vs. Lobov	April 22, 2017	2	1:05	Nashville, Tennessee, United States	
Loss	31–12	Jorge Masvidal	TKO (punches)	The Ultimate Fighter: Tournament of Champions Finale	December 3, 2016	1	4:05	Las Vegas, Nevada, United States	
Win	31–11	Matt Brown	TKO (kick to the body and punches)	UFC 201	July 30, 2016	1	1:46	Atlanta, Georgia, United States	Performance of the Night.
Loss	30–11	Tarec Saffiedine	Decision (unanimous)	UFC on Fox: Johnson vs. Bader	January 30, 2016	3	5:00	Newark, New Jersey, United States	
Loss	30–10	Stephen Thompson	KO (spinning wheel kick)	The Ultimate Fighter: American Top Team vs. Blackzilians Finale	July 12, 2015	1	4:29	Las Vegas, Nevada, United States	
Win	30–9	Josh Koscheck	Submission (north-south choke)	UFC 184	February 28, 2015	2	4:20	Los Angeles, California, United States	Performance of the Night.
Loss	29–9	Kelvin Gastelum	Submission (rear-naked choke)	UFC 180	November 15, 2014	1	4:46	Mexico City, Mexico	
Loss	29–8	Robbie Lawler	TKO (knee and punches)	UFC 173	May 24, 2014	3	3:06	Las Vegas, Nevada, United States	
Loss	29–7	Rory MacDonald	Decision (unanimous)	UFC on Fox: Johnson vs. Moraga	July 27, 2013	3	5:00	Seattle, Washington, United States	
Win	29–6	Nate Marquardt	KO (punches)	UFC 158	March 16, 2013	1	3:00	Montreal, Quebec, Canada	Knockout of the Night.
Win	28–6	Jay Hieron	Decision (unanimous)	UFC on FX: Browne vs. Bigfoot	October 5, 2012	3	5:00	Minneapolis, Minnesota, United States	
Loss	27–6	Martin Kampmann	TKO (knees)	The Ultimate Fighter: Live Finale	June 1, 2012	2	1:40	Las Vegas, Nevada, United States	
Win	27–5	Diego Sanchez	Decision (unanimous)	UFC on Fuel TV: Sanchez vs. Ellenberger	February 15, 2012	3	5:00	Omaha, Nebraska, United States	Fight of the Night.
Win	26–5	Jake Shields	TKO (knee and punches)	UFC Fight Night: Shields vs. Ellenberger	September 17, 2011	1	0:53	New Orleans, Louisiana, United States	Knockout of the Night.
Win	25–5	Sean Pierson	KO (punches)	UFC 129	April 30, 2011	1	2:42	Toronto, Ontario, Canada	
Win	24–5	Carlos Eduardo Rocha	Decision (split)	UFC 126	February 5, 2011	3	5:00	Las Vegas, Nevada, United States	
Win	23–5	John Howard	TKO (doctor stoppage)	UFC Live: Jones vs. Matyushenko	August 1, 2010	3	2:21	San Diego, California, United States	
Win	22–5	Mike Pyle	TKO (punches)	UFC 108	January 2, 2010	2	0:22	Las Vegas, Nevada, United States	
Loss	21–5	Carlos Condit	Decision (split)	UFC Fight Night: Diaz vs. Guillard	September 16, 2009	3	5:00	Oklahoma City, Oklahoma, United States	
Win	21–4	Marcelo Alfaya	KO (punch)	Bellator 11	June 12, 2009	1	0:42	Uncasville, Connecticut, United States	Catchweight (175 lbs) bout.
Win	20–4	Brendan Seguin	Decision (unanimous)	VFC 27: Mayhem	May 1, 2009	3	5:00	Council Bluffs, Iowa, United States	
Win	19–4	Doo Won Seo	TKO (doctor stoppage)	M-1 Challenge 6: Korea	August 29, 2008	2	3:04	Seoul, South Korea	
Win	18–4	Farouk Lakebir	Decision (majority)	M-1 Challenge 5: Japan	July 17, 2008	2	5:00	Tokyo, Japan	
Loss	17–4	Rick Story	Decision (unanimous)	SF 23: Heated Rivals	June 20, 2008	3	5:00	Portland, Oregon, United States	
Win	17–3	Pat Healy	Decision (unanimous)	IFL: Las Vegas	February 29, 2008	3	4:00	Las Vegas, Nevada, United States	
Win	16–3	Jose Landi-Jons	KO (punch)	EFC 5: Revolution	November 3, 2007	1	0:09	Prince George, British Columbia, Canada	
Loss	15–3	Delson Heleno	Submission (armbar)	IFL: 2007 Team Championship Final	September 20, 2007	2	3:45	Hollywood, Florida, United States	
Win	15–2	Zach Light	TKO (punches)	Bodog Fight: Costa Rica Combat	February 16, 2007	1	3:51	San José, Costa Rica	
Win	14–2	Ben Uker	TKO (punches)	IFL : Championship Final	December 29, 2006	2	1:44	Uncasville, Connecticut, United States	Middleweight bout.
Loss	13–2	Derrick Noble	Decision (unanimous)	Bodog Fight: Clash of the Nations	December 16, 2006	3	5:00	St. Petersburg, Russia	
Win	13–1	Ryan Stout	TKO (punches)	IFC: Rumble on the River 2	November 10, 2006	2	4:06	Kearney, Nebraska, United States	
Loss	12–1	Jay Hieron	Decision (unanimous)	IFL: Championship 2006	June 3, 2006	3	4:00	Atlantic City, New Jersey, United States	
Win	12–0	Gil Castillo	TKO (punches)	IFC: Caged Combat	April 1, 2006	1	1:30	Sacramento, California, United States	
Win	11–0	Kenneth Allen	Submission (armbar)	IFC: Rumble on the River	March 11, 2006	1	N/A	Kearney, Nebraska, United States	
Win	10–0	Mark Bear	TKO (doctor stoppage)	VFC 12: Warpath	February 25, 2006	2	N/A	Council Bluffs, Iowa, United States	Doctor stoppage due to cut.
Win	9–0	Laverne Clark	Submission (triangle choke)	KOTC 64: Raging Bull	December 16, 2005	2	3:06	Cleveland, Ohio, United States	
Win	8–0	Sean Huffman	TKO (submission to punches)	VFC 11: Demolition	December 3, 2005	3	0:22	Council Bluffs, Iowa, United States	
Win	7–0	Brian Daley	TKO (punches)	AFC 4: New Hitter	November 18, 2005	1	1:31	Omaha, Nebraska, United States	
Win	6–0	Evan Boemer	KO (punches)	Extreme Challenge 65	October 21, 2005	1	0:48	Medina, Minnesota, United States	
Win	5–0	Brent Shepard	KO (punch)	All Fighting Championships 3	September 24, 2005	1	N/A	Omaha, Nebraska, United States	
Win	4–0	Deryck Ripley	TKO (submission to punches)	VFC 10: Championship X	August 6, 2005	1	1:41	Council Bluffs, Iowa, United States	
Win	3–0	Brad Fox	TKO (punches)	ROF 17: Unstoppable	June 18, 2005	2	2:15	Castle Rock, Colorado, United States	
Win	2–0	Cory Simpson	Submission (choke)	XKK: Des Moines	May 20, 2005	3	N/A	Des Moines, Iowa, United States	
Win	1–0	Cameron Wells	TKO (punches)	AFC 1: Takedown	April 9, 2005	1	N/A	Omaha, Nebraska, United States	

== Personal life ==
On March 1, 2016, at the Hollywood Walk of Fame, Ellenberger was interviewed in the segment Lie Witness News of talk show Jimmy Kimmel Live. He was caught lying about having voted for Donald Trump in the presidential primaries at Super Tuesday that morning, yet the election for California was not held until June 7, 2016. However, multiple people who were previously featured on the segment claimed that the answers were taken out of context; others stated that they were playing along, knowing that it was a joke.

== See also ==
- List of male mixed martial artists
