= Rory Markham =

American mixed martial arts fighter, stuntman and actor

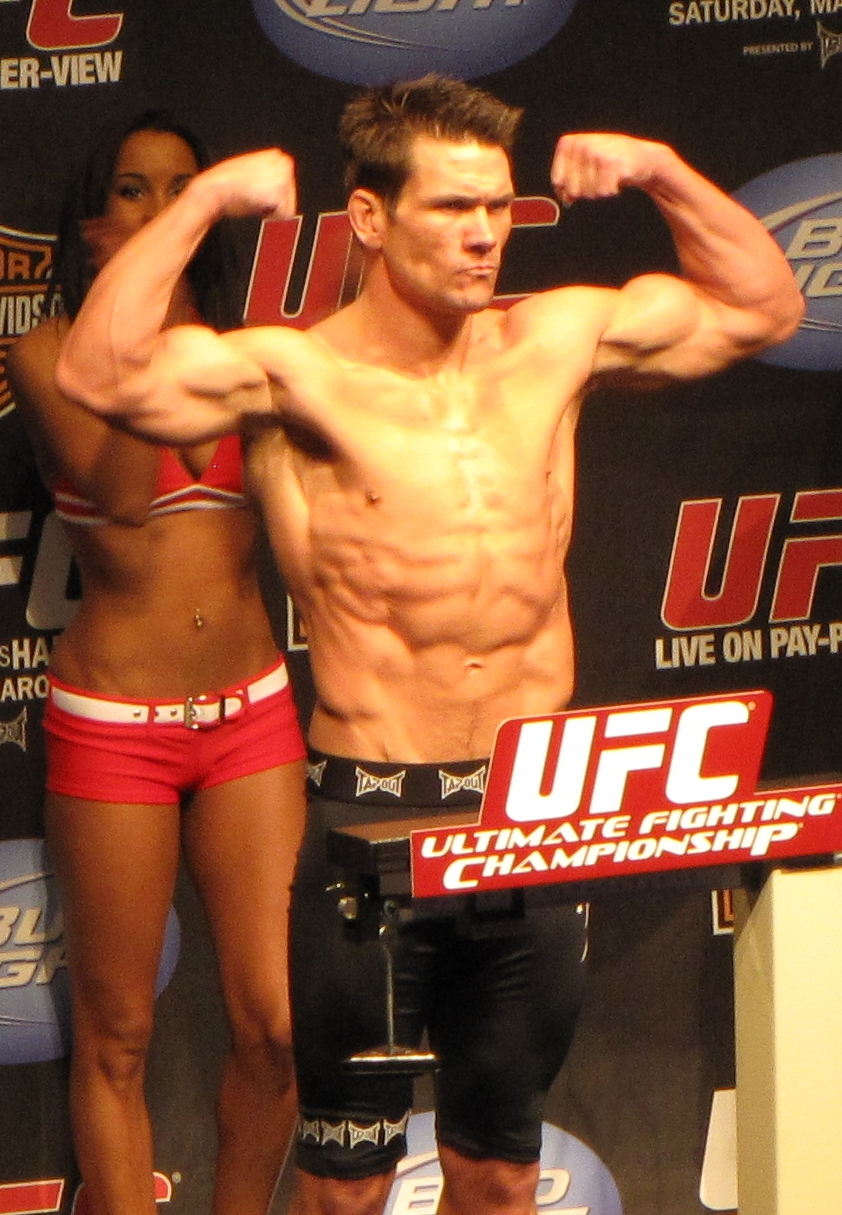
- Born: March 25, 1982 (age 44); Oak Lawn, Illinois, United States
- Nationality: American
- Height: 5 ft 10 in (1.78 m)
- Weight: 185 lb (84 kg; 13.2 st)
- Division: Middleweight; Welterweight
- Reach: 71.0 in (180 cm)
- Stance: Orthodox
- Fighting out of: Crystal Lake, Illinois, United States
- Team: Team Curran
- Years active: 2003-present

Mixed martial arts record
- Total: 23
- Wins: 17
- By knockout: 12
- By submission: 5
- Losses: 6
- By knockout: 6

Other information
- Mixed martial arts record from Sherdog

Rory Markham (born March 25, 1982) is an American professional mixed martial artist and actor who most recently acted alongside Will Smith playing Booker Grassie in the latest addition to the Bad Boys franchise Bad Boys for Life. Formerly, Rory competed in the Welterweight, Middleweight and Light Heavyweight Divisions. A professional competitor since 2003, Markham has formerly competed for the UFC and the IFL.

== Background ==
An experienced martial artist from a young age, Markham began training in Shidokan Karate at the age of six before later transitioning into Kenpo. At the age of 13, Markham began training in Kyokushin and began fighting in full-contact competitions when he was 15, winning all of his matches by knockout despite often being paired against much older opponents. Markham also began competing in boxing at the age of 17, holding an undefeated amateur record of 10–0. Markham later became affiliated with Pat Miletich.

== Mixed martial arts career ==
=== Early career ===
In 2003, Markham made his professional mixed martial arts debut, winning via first-round knockout. Markham would go on to compile a record of 8–2, competing in the regional circuit, before being invited to compete in the International Fight League for the Quad Cities Silverbacks, under his coach at the Miletich Fighting Systems, Pat Miletich.

=== IFL ===
Markham made his IFL debut at IFL: Legends Championship 2006 on April 29, 2006, against veteran Mike Pyle. Markham won in 44 seconds via knockout.

Markham followed this up with three more wins in the promotion all via KO/TKO over Brad Blackburn, Marcelo Acevedo, and Keith Wisniewski, respectively, before facing future UFC veteran Chris Wilson at the IFL: Championship Final. Markham was handed his first defeated inside of the promotion via TKO in the first round. Markham soon bounced back with two more knockout wins over Pat Healy and Chris Clements, respectively, before being defeated via second-round knockout at the hands of Brett Cooper at the IFL: World Grand Prix Finals.

=== Post-IFL ===
After the demise of the IFL, Markham fought for Adrenaline MMA's inaugural event on June 14, 2008, facing veteran Jay Ellis. Markham won via triangle choke submission in the first round.

=== UFC ===
With an overall 15–4 professional record, Markham was signed by the UFC. Markham made his debut at UFC Fight Night 14 on July 19, 2008, against Canadian Brodie Farber. After almost being finished early on in the fight, Markham knocked out Farber with a head kick. This victory earned him a Knockout of the Night award and was a nominee on Sherdog.com for "Knockout of the Year" and "Comeback of the Year".

In his next appearance, Markham faced British fighter Dan Hardy at UFC 95 on February 20, 2009, in London, England. Markham was knocked out with a left hook in the first round. Markham was then expected to face Martin Kampmann at UFC 108 on January 2, 2010, but pulled out due to a knee injury.

Markham then fought at UFC 111 on March 27, 2010, against Nate Diaz. After Markham was six pounds overweight at the weigh-ins, the fight was made a catchweight bout at 177 pounds (80 kg), and Markham was fined $1,000 as a result. This was significant as it was only the second time a fighter training with the Miletich Fighting Systems did not make weight in 15 years. Markham was defeated via TKO in the first round and was released by the promotion.

=== Post-UFC ===
After being released from the UFC, Markham signed with Bellator and was expected to make his promotional debut at Bellator 26 against Steve Carl on August 26, 2010, for a spot in the Season Four Welterweight Tournament. However, Markham pulled out due to not being cleared to fight.

Markham was next expected to face Rudy Bears at Titan FC 18 on May 27, 2011, but withdrew from the fight. Markham was most recently scheduled to fight on June 16, 2012, against Jon Kirk at Battle Xtreme Championship but the fight was cancelled.

== Film ==
Markham is a trained actor and member of the Screen Actors Guild. His films include The Death and Life of Bobby Z with Paul Walker and Laurence Fishburne; The Experiment with Adrien Brody and Forest Whitaker; Setup with Bruce Willis, 50 Cent, and Ryan Phillippe; and Alex Cross with Tyler Perry and Matthew Fox.

== Filmography ==
Year	Title	Film/Television	Role	Other notes
2007	The Death and Life of Bobby Z	Film	Half-Blood	
2010	The Experiment	Film	Wally Ziolkowski	
2011	Setup	Film	Markus	
2012	Alex Cross	Film	Nonied Soscheck	
2020	Bad Boys for Life	Film	Booker Grassie	

== Championships and accomplishments ==
- Ultimate Fighting Championship
  - UFC.com Awards
    - 2008: Ranked #9 Knockout of the Year vs. Brodie Farber
- MMA Fighting
  - 2008 #7 Ranked UFC Knockout of the Year vs. Brodie Farber at UFC Fight Night 14

== Mixed martial arts record ==
Professional record breakdown
23 matches	17 wins	6 losses
By knockout	12	6
By submission	5	0
By decision	0	0

Res.	Record	Opponent	Method	Event	Date	Round	Time	Location	Notes
Win	17–6	Brian Green	TKO (punches)	XFO 58	March 20, 2016	1	1:06	Lake Geneva, Wisconsin, United States	Middleweight debut.
Loss	16–6	Nate Diaz	TKO (punches)	UFC 111	March 27, 2010	1	2:47	Newark, New Jersey, United States	Catchweight (177 lb) bout. Markham missed weight.
Loss	16–5	Dan Hardy	KO (punch)	UFC 95	February 20, 2009	1	1:09	London, England, United Kingdom	
Win	16–4	Brodie Farber	KO (head kick)	UFC Fight Night 14	July 19, 2008	1	1:37	Las Vegas, Nevada, United States	Knockout of the Night.
Win	15–4	Jay Ellis	Submission (triangle choke)	Adrenaline MMA 1	June 14, 2008	1	1:57	Chicago, Illinois, United States	
Loss	14–4	Brett Cooper	TKO (punches)	IFL: World Grand Prix Finals	December 29, 2007	2	1:15	Uncasville, Connecticut, United States	
Win	14–3	Chris Clements	TKO (punches)	IFL: 2007 Semifinals	August 2, 2007	1	1:17	East Rutherford, New Jersey, United States	
Win	13–3	Pat Healy	KO (punches)	IFL: Moline	April 7, 2007	3	1:47	Moline, Illinois, United States	
Loss	12–3	Chris Wilson	TKO (punches)	IFL: Championship Final	December 29, 2006	1	2:14	Uncasville, Connecticut, United States	
Win	12–2	Keith Wisniewski	TKO (corner stoppage)	IFL: World Championship Semifinals	November 2, 2006	3	4:00	Portland, Oregon, United States	
Win	11–2	Marcelo Azevedo	TKO (punches)	IFL: Gracie vs. Miletich	September 23, 2006	1	3:58	Moline, Illinois, United States	
Win	10–2	Brad Blackburn	KO (punch)	IFL: Championship 2006	June 3, 2006	2	0:23	Atlantic City, New Jersey, United States	
Win	9–2	Mike Pyle	KO (punch)	IFL: Legends Championship 2006	April 29, 2006	1	0:44	Atlantic City, New Jersey, United States	
Loss	8–2	Trevor Garrett	TKO (punches)	Xtreme Fighting Organization 10	March 18, 2006	1	0:47	Lakemoor, Illinois, United States	
Win	8–1	Brian Green	KO (punch)	Xtreme Fighting Organization 9	January 28, 2006	1	0:26	Lakemoor, Illinois, United States	
Win	7–1	Mike Van Meer	KO (punch)	Extreme Challenge 64	October 15, 2005	1	1:48	Osceola, Iowa, United States	
Win	6–1	Victor Moreno	Submission (rear-naked choke)	Extreme Challenge 61	April 22, 2005	1	4:16	Osceola, Iowa, United States	
Win	5–1	Jimmy Boyd	Submission (triangle choke)	Xtreme Fighting Organization 5	March 19, 2005	1	2:13	Lakemoor, Illinois, United States	
Win	4–1	James Warfield	TKO (punches)	Xtreme Fighting Organization 3	October 2, 2004	2	1:12	McHenry, Illinois, United States	
Win	3–1	Ryan Williams	Submission (triangle choke)	Courage Fighting Championships 1	July 24, 2004	2	2:53	Decatur, Illinois, United States	
Win	2–1	Jason Guida	Submission (armbar)	Xtreme Fighting Organization 2	June 26, 2004	2	0:58	Fontana, Wisconsin, United States	
Loss	1–1	Kurt Illeman	TKO (cut)	Extreme Challenge 55	December 5, 2003	1	1:26	Lakemoor, Illinois, United States	
Win	1–0	John Bulger	KO (punches)	Extreme Challenge 54	October 12, 2003	1	0:59	Lakemoor, Illinois, United States	
