= Southern California Condors =

MMA team

The Southern California Condors are an International Fight League team based in Orange County, California. Coached by MMA legend Marco Ruas, the Condors were one of four new teams established at the beginning of the 2007 season. The Condors have an assistant coach, female MMA star Debi Purcell.

On May 5, 2007, Condor's outstanding Middleweight, Jeremy Williams was found dead of an apparent suicide.

== Record/Roster ==
The Condors are 8-7 as of May 2007 in team competition. All records are IFL fights only

^{a}= fight was an alternate fight, that does not go towards team record

^{1}= fought when Levens dropped down to Middleweight

^{GP}= fought during individual GP, does not go towards team record

=== Current fighters as of 2007 season ===
- Adam Lynn (1-2) (LW)

lost to Shad Lierley by TKO (strikes) in the first round (01/19/07)

lost to Savant Young by KO(punch) in the second round (03/17/07)

def to Josh Odom by decision (unanimous) (05/19/07)

- Danny Suarez (2-1) (LW) ALTERNATE

def Tristan Witt by submission (shoulder lock) in the first round (01/19/07)

lost to Zach George by decision (unanimous) (03/17/07)

def Clint Coronel by decision (split) (05/19/07)^{a}

- Rodrigo Ruas (0-2) (WW)

was supposed to face Tiger Sharks' but suffered an eye injury which cancelled the fight at the last second. Instead an alternate bout between lightweights took place.

lost to Antonio McKee by decision (unanimous) (03/17/07)

lost to Donnie Liles by submission (keylock) in the first round (05/19/07)

- Justin Levens (0-3) (LHW)

lost to Reese Andy by decision (unanimous) (01/19/07)

lost to Vladimir Matyushenko by TKO(strikes) in the first round (03/17/07)

lost to Brian Foster by TKO (punches) in the first round (05/19/07)^{1}

- Emmanuel Newton (1-0) (LHW)

def Jeff Quinlan by submission (side choke) in the first round (05/19/07)

- Antoine Jaoude (4-1) (HW)

def Curtis Crawford by decision (unanimous) (01/19/07)

def Wayne Cole by KO (punch) in the second round (03/17/07)

def Dan Christison by decision (unanimous) (05/19/07)

def Shane Ott by submission (arm triangle) in the first round (11/03/07)^{GP}

lost to Roy Nelson by TKO (strikes) in the second round (12/29/07)^{GP}

=== Former Fighters ===
- Jeremy Williams (2-0) (MW)

def Bristol Marunde by submission (triangle choke) in the first round (01/19/07)

def Kaz Hamanaka by submission (triangle choke) in the first round (03/17/07)

Died on 5/05/07

== 2007 season schedule/Results ==
Date	Opponent	Result
January 19, 2007	Seattle Tiger Sharks	W 3-2
March 17, 2007	Tokyo Sabres	L 2-3
May 19, 2007	San Jose Razorclaws	W 3-2
