= Jay Hieron =

American mixed martial artist

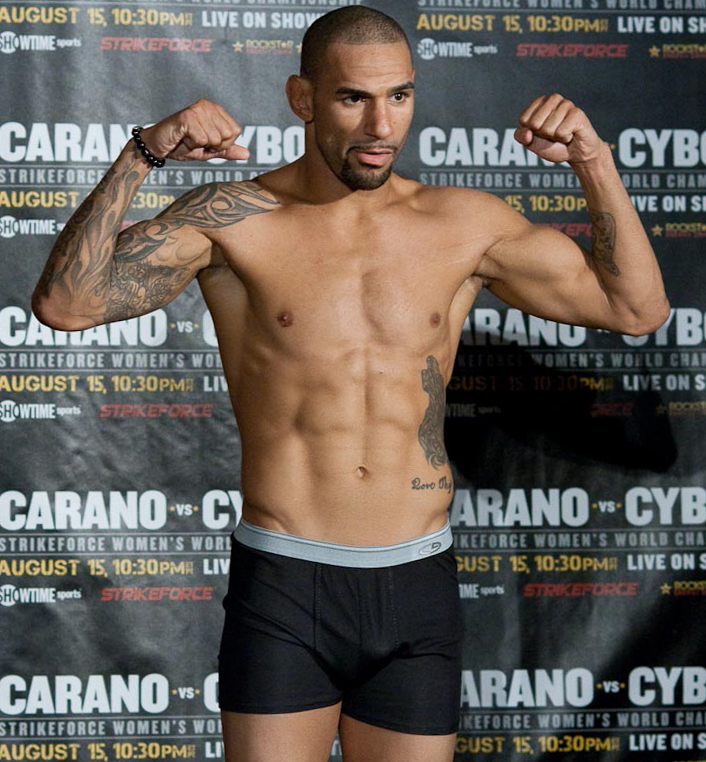
- Jay Hieron in 2009, at the weigh-in before the Strikeforce: Carano vs. Cyborg event.
- Born: July 29, 1976 (age 50); Freeport, New York, U.S.
- Other names: The Thoroughbred
- Height: 6 ft 0 in (183 cm)
- Weight: 170 lb (77 kg; 12 st)
- Division: Welterweight
- Reach: 75 in (191 cm)
- Fighting out of: Las Vegas, Nevada, United States
- Team: Xtreme Couture
- Rank: NJCAA Division I Wrestling
- Years active: 2003–2014

Mixed martial arts record
- Total: 30
- Wins: 23
- By knockout: 7
- By submission: 6
- By decision: 10
- Losses: 7
- By knockout: 4
- By decision: 3

Other information
- University: Hofstra University
- Notable schools: Nassau Community College; Freeport High School (New York)
- Mixed martial arts record from Sherdog

Jay Hieron (born July 29, 1976) is an American actor, stuntman and former mixed martial artist. Hieron was the final IFL Welterweight Champion, competing for the Los Angeles Anacondas, and has also competed in the UFC, WEC, Affliction, Strikeforce, and Bellator.

== Early life ==
Hieron went to live with John and Theo Hieronymous when he was a newborn due to the fact that his mother had trouble raising him. He was officially adopted by the couple when he was eight years old.

Hieron, a two-time state wrestling championship runner-up at Freeport (N.Y.) High School and national Junior College Champion at Nassau (N.Y.) Community College, where he earned an associate degree, Hieron later attended Hofstra University. Before his senior year at Hofstra University, he tested positive for marijuana, and was unable to wrestle his senior year.

== Mixed martial arts ==
After being kicked off the wrestling team at Hofstra University, Hieron began dealing drugs before being charged with a felony. He turned to boxing to let his aggressions out on the bags. Finding this to be a good stress-reliever, and with the encouragement of some friends who trained in MMA, Hieron combined his wrestling skills and burgeoning boxing prowess into a professional MMA career.

=== Early career ===
In March 2006, Hieron won the Lockdown in Paradise in Lahaina, Hawaii, and in June 2006 won his IFL debut at the IFL Team Championships in Atlantic City, New Jersey.

Following the demise of the International Fight League due to financial concerns, Hieron signed with Affliction in August 2008. However, that promotion soon folded as well, so Hieron signed with Strikeforce.

=== Strikeforce ===
Hieron's first Strikeforce fight was set to be against fellow former Zuffa competitor Nick Diaz at Strikeforce: Carano vs. Cyborg for the inaugural Strikeforce welterweight title. However, Diaz missed a pre-fight drug test mandated by the California State Athletic Commission and was denied a license to compete. Jesse Taylor was named to replace Diaz and the fight was changed to a non-title bout. Hieron won by unanimous decision. He had his heart set on a title shot against Nick Diaz, but has stated that he would be comfortable fighting any top level opponent, as long as the fight, and name is helping him move forward in his career.

Hieron faced Joe Riggs on January 30, 2010 at Strikeforce: Miami. Hieron won the fight via unanimous decision. After the fight had finished, Hieron's contract with Strikeforce was completed, prompting Hieron to immediately call for demands should he sign a new one. The demands included a shot at champion Nick Diaz and guaranteed television spots.

=== Bellator Fighting Championships ===
Hieron and Explosion Entertainment were unable to come to terms, so Hieron instead ended up signing to fight on Bellator Fighting Championships in the promotion's Season 4 welterweight tournament. In the opening quarterfinal round Hieron won via controversial stoppage when referee Josh Rosenthal stopped the bout when Lapsley did not respond to a hand check. Lapsley contested he wasn't out and this appeared to be the case, but given the position, it is unlikely that he would have survived the round. Hieron stated in a post-fight interview that Lapsley was gurgling and he felt him going out. Hieron won a controversial unanimous decision victory over Brent Weedman at Bellator 40 to move on to the tournament finals. At Bellator 43 Hieron defeated Rick Hawn via split decision to win the Season 4 Welterweight Tournament. With this victory Hieron earned a title shot against Bellator Welterweight Champion Ben Askren. Askren defeated Hieron via controversial split decision.

=== Ultimate Fighting Championship ===
Hieron was expected to face Jake Ellenberger in a rematch on September 1, 2012 at UFC 151, replacing an injured Josh Koscheck. However, after the UFC 151 event was cancelled, Ellenberger/Hieron took place on October 5, 2012 at UFC on FX 5. Hieron lost via unanimous decision.

Hieron was expected to face Erick Silva on February 2, 2013 at UFC 156. However, Silva pulled out of the bout citing an injury and was replaced by promotional newcomer Tyron Woodley. He lost the fight by KO (punches) in round 1 and was subsequently released from the promotion.

On March 7, 2014, Hieron announced his retirement from MMA competition.

== Championships and accomplishments ==
=== Mixed martial arts ===
- Bellator Fighting Championships
  - Bellator Season 4 Welterweight Tournament Winner
- International Fight League
  - IFL Welterweight Championship (One time; First; Last)
  - IFL 2007 Welterweight Grand Prix Champion

=== Amateur wrestling ===
- National Junior College Athletic Association
  - NJCAA Junior Collegiate Championship (1997)
  - NJCAA All-American (1996, 1997)
- New York State Public High School Athletic Association
  - NYSPHSAA Division I High School State Championship Runner-up (1992, 1994)

== Mixed martial arts record ==
Professional record breakdown
30 matches	23 wins	7 losses
By knockout	7	4
By submission	6	0
By decision	10	3

Res.	Record	Opponent	Method	Event	Date	Round	Time	Location	Notes
Loss	23–7	Tyron Woodley	KO (punches)	UFC 156	February 28, 2013	1	0:36	Las Vegas, Nevada, United States	
Loss	23–6	Jake Ellenberger	Decision (unanimous)	UFC on FX: Browne vs. Bigfoot	October 5, 2012	3	5:00	Minneapolis, Minnesota, United States	
Win	23–5	Romario da Silva	Technical Submission (d'arce choke)	Legacy Fighting Championship 12	July 13, 2012	2	2:04	Houston, Texas, United States	
Loss	22–5	Ben Askren	Decision (split)	Bellator 56	October 29, 2011	5	5:00	Kansas City, Missouri, United States	For the Bellator Welterweight World Championship.
Win	22–4	Rick Hawn	Decision (split)	Bellator 43	May 7, 2011	3	5:00	Newkirk, Oklahoma, United States	Bellator Season 4 Welterweight Tournament Final
Win	21–4	Brent Weedman	Decision (unanimous)	Bellator 40	April 9, 2011	3	5:00	Newkirk, Oklahoma, United States	Bellator Season 4 Welterweight Tournament Semifinal
Win	20–4	Anthony Lapsley	Technical Submission (rear-naked choke)	Bellator 35	March 5, 2011	1	3:39	Lemoore, California, United States	Bellator Season 4 Welterweight Tournament Quarterfinal
Win	19–4	Joe Riggs	Decision (unanimous)	Strikeforce: Miami	January 30, 2010	3	5:00	Sunrise, Florida, United States	
Win	18–4	Jesse Taylor	Decision (unanimous)	Strikeforce: Carano vs. Cyborg	August 15, 2009	3	5:00	San Jose, California, United States	
Win	17–4	Jason High	KO (punch)	Affliction: Day of Reckoning	January 24, 2009	1	1:04	Anaheim, California, United States	
Win	16–4	Chris Kennedy	Decision (unanimous)	SuperFights MMA: Night of Combat 2	October 11, 2008	3	5:00	Las Vegas, Nevada, United States	
Win	15–4	Mark Miller	TKO (punches)	IFL: New Jersey	April 4, 2008	1	2:10	East Rutherford, New Jersey, United States	Defended the IFL Welterweight Championship.
Win	14–4	Delson Heleno	TKO (leg injury)	IFL World Grand Prix Finals	December 29, 2007	1	4:00	Uncasville, Connecticut, United States	IFL 2007 Welterweight Grand Prix Final; Won the inaugural IFL Welterweight Championship.
Win	13–4	Donnie Liles	Decision (unanimous)	IFL: World Grand Prix Semifinals	November 3, 2007	3	4:00	Chicago, Illinois, United States	IFL 2007 Welterweight Grand Prix Semifinal
Loss	12–4	Brad Blackburn	KO (punches)	IFL: Everett	June 1, 2007	1	0:40	Everett, Washington, United States	
Win	12–3	Donnie Liles	Submission (guillotine choke)	IFL: Los Angeles	March 17, 2007	1	2:49	Los Angeles, California, United States	
Win	11–3	Victor Moreno	Submission (rear-naked choke)	IFL: Houston	February 2, 2007	1	1:55	Houston, Texas, United States	
Loss	10–3	Chris Wilson	Decision (unanimous)	IFL: World Championship Semifinals	November 2, 2006	3	4:00	Portland, Oregon, United States	
Win	10–2	Amos Sotelo	Submission (guillotine choke)	IFL: Portland	September 9, 2006	1	0:26	Portland, Oregon, United States	
Win	9–2	Jake Ellenberger	Decision (unanimous)	IFL: Championship 2006	June 3, 2006	3	4:00	Atlantic City, New Jersey, United States	
Win	8–2	Steve Schneider	TKO (punches)	Titan FC 1	March 11, 2006	1	0:55	Kansas City, Kansas, United States	
Loss	7–2	Jonathan Goulet	TKO (doctor stoppage)	UFC Fight Night 2	October 3, 2005	3	1:05	Las Vegas, Nevada, United States	
Win	7–1	Pat Healy	Decision (unanimous)	IFC: Rock N' Rumble	July 30, 2005	3	5:00	Reno, Nevada, United States	
Win	6–1	Richard Brass	Decision (unanimous)	WEC 15: Judgment Day	May 19, 2005	3	5:00	Lemoore, California, United States	
Win	5–1	Ronald Jhun	TKO (doctor stoppage)	Lockdown in Paradise 1	March 19, 2005	1	4:34	Hawaii, United States	
Loss	4–1	Georges St-Pierre	TKO (punches)	UFC 48	June 19, 2004	1	1:42	Las Vegas, Nevada, United States	
Win	4–0	Fabio Holanda	Decision (unanimous)	MMA: Eruption	April 30, 2004	3	5:00	Lowell, Massachusetts, United States	
Win	3–0	Fernando Munoz	TKO (submission to punches)	Ring of Combat 6	April 24, 2004	1	0:33	Elizabeth, New Jersey, United States	
Win	2–0	Jermaine Johnson	Submission (rear-naked choke)	Ring of Combat 5	December 14, 2003	1	1:02	Elizabeth, New Jersey, United States	
Win	1–0	Keith Plate	TKO (punches)	Reality Fighting 4	July 19, 2003	1	1:28	Bayonne, New Jersey, United States	

== See also ==
- List of Bellator MMA alumni
- List of Strikeforce alumni

New championship	1st IFL Welterweight Champion; December 29, 2007 – July 31, 2008	Succeeded by IFL ceased operations
