= Chicago Red Bears =

MMA team based in Chicago

The Chicago Red Bears were an International Fight League team based in Chicago, Illinois. Coached by Igor Zinoviev, the Red Bears were one of four Mixed martial arts teams established in 2007 for the IFL's second season.

== Record/roster ==
The Red Bears are 4-11 as of May 2007 in team competition. All records are IFL fights only

^{1}= fought when Tim Kennedy was at Light Heavyweight

^{2}= fought when Adam Maciejewski was at Heavyweight

CURRENT FIGHTERS AS OF 2007 SEASON:

- John Strawn (0-1) (LW)

lost to Bart Palaszewski by KO (punch) in the first round (05/19/07)

- Mark Miller (2-1) (WW)

lost to Delson Heleno by decision (unanimous) (02/23/07)

def Brad Blackburn by decision (unanimous) (04/07/07)

def Josh Neer by KO in the first round (05/19/07)

- Tim Kennedy (3-0) (MW)

def Dante Rivera by submission (strikes) in the second round (02/23/07)^{1}

def Ryan McGivern by submission (guillotine choke) in the second round (05/19/07)

def Elias Rivera by KO in the first round (12/29/07)^{GP}

- Adam Maciejewski (0-2) (LHW)

lost to Reese Andy by submission (rear naked choke) in the third round (04/07/07)^{2}

lost to Mike Ciesnolevicz by TKO (punches) in the second round (05/19/07)

- Travis Fulton (0-1) (HW)

lost to Ben Rothwell by submission (kimura) in the second round (05/19/07)

=== Former fighters ===
- Mike Corey (0-1) (LW)

lost to Shad Lierley by decision (split) (04/07/07)

- Peter Kaljevic (0-1) (LW)

lost to Erik Owings by submission (rear naked choke) in the second round (02/23/07)

- Chris Albandia (0-1) (MW)

lost to Fabio Leopoldo by submission (guillotine choke) in the first round (02/23/07)

Chris Albandia was supposed to fight Bristol Marunde on 4/07/07 but was injured during training and could not take the fight. Thus alternate John Kading fought instead.

- John Kading (0-1) (MW) ALTERNATE

lost to Bristol Marunde by TKO (strikes) in the first round (04/07/07)

- Homer Moore (0-1) (LHW)

lost to Allan Goes by TKO (ref stoppage) in the second round (04/07/07)

- Armin Mrkanovic (0-0) (LHW)

Mrkanovic was supposed to face Dante Rivera on 2/23/07 but suffered an injury. Thus alternate Tim Kennedy took the fight instead.

- Mahmoud Fowzi (0-1) (HW)

lost to Bryan Ventell by submission (keylock) in the first round (02/23/07)

== 2007 season schedule/ results ==
Date	Opponent	Result
February 23, 2007	New York Pitbulls	L 1-4
April 7, 2007	Seattle Tiger Sharks	L 1-4
May 19, 2007	Quad City Silverbacks	L 2-3
