= Los Angeles Anacondas =

MMA team

Anacondas
- League: International Fight League
- Based in: Los Angeles, California
- Head coach: Bas Rutten, Shawn Tompkins

The Los Angeles Anacondas were an International Fight League team based in Los Angeles, California. The Anacondas were the first IFL team to have gone through not just one coach but two. Originally coached by three time King of Pancrase and former UFC Heavyweight Champion Bas Rutten, and then coached by Canadian MMA practitioner Shawn Tompkins, the Anacondas are now without a coach entering the offseason.

The Anacondas were one of four teams competing in the IFL's inaugural season. As of March 2007, the Anacondas were the only IFL team to hold two perfect sweeps (5 wins and no losses) over opposing teams (the Tokyo Sabres on September 9, 2006, and the San Jose Razorclaws on March 17, 2007).

During the inaugural 2007 IFL Grand Prix, the Anacondas had the most members from their team participate with an astounding four out of five members.

== Record/Roster ==
The Anacondas were 20–15 as of August 2007 in team competition.

Reached 2007 IFL Semifinals (lost to Quad City Silverbacks)

All records were IFL fights only

^{*}= fought as an intraleague superfight that does not go towards team record

^{a}= fought as an alternate bought that does not go towards team record

^{1}= fought when Pyle was at WW

^{GP}= fought during the individual GP and does not go towards team record

=== Current Fighters as of 2007 Season ===
- Chris Horodecki (7–1) (LW)

def Erik Owings by KO in the first round (6/03/06)^{*}

def Ed West by Unanimous decision (9/09/06)

def Ryan Schultz by TKO (strikes) in the second round (11/02/06)

def Bart Palaszewski by decision (split) (02/02/07)

def Josh Odom by decision (unanimous) (03/17/07)

def Shad Lierley by decision (unanimous) (06/01/07)

Horodecki was supposed to face Bart Palaszweski in the 2007 semifinals but suffered an injury during training, thus alternate Harris Sarmiento took the fight

def Bart Palaszewski by decision (split) (11/03/07)^{GP}

lost to Ryan Schultz by TKO (strikes) in the first round (12/29/07)^{GP}

lost to Bart Palaszweski by submission (guillotine choke) in the third round (08/02/07)

- Conor Heun (2–1) (LW) ALTERNATE

def Clint Coronel by decision (split) (03/17/07)^{a}

def Tristan Witt by submission (armbar) in the first round (06/01/07)^{a}

lost to LC Davis by decision (unanimous) (08/02/07)^{a}

=== IFL Welterweight Champion ===
- Jay Hieron (6–2) (WW)

def Jake Ellenberger by unanimous decision (6/03/06)^{*}

def Amos Sotelo by submission (guillotine choke) in the first round (9/09/06)

lost to Chris Wilson by decision (unanimous) (11/02/06)

def Victor Moreno by submission (rear naked choke) in the first round (02/02/07)

def Donnie Liles by submission (guillotine choke) in the first round (03/17/07)

lost to Brad Blackburn by KO (punch) in the first round (06/01/07)

Hieron was supposed to face Rory Markham in the 2007 IFL semifinals but suffered an injury during training, thus alternate Chris Clements took the fight instead

def Donnie Liles by decision (unanimous) (11/03/07)^{GP}

def Delson Heleno by TKO (strikes) in the first round to win the Welterweight Championship(12/29/07)^{GP}

- Chris Clements (0–1) (WW) ALTERNATE

lost to Rory Markham by TKO (strikes) in the first round (08/02/07)

- Benji Radach (5–1) (MW)

def Ryan McGivern by TKO (strikes) in the second round (02/02/07)

def Brian Foster by submission (guillotine choke) in the first round (03/17/07)

def Bristol Marunde by TKO (strikes) in the first round (06/01/07)

def Gerald Harris by TKO (strikes) in the first round (08/02/07)

def Brent Beauparlant by KO in the first round (11/03/07)^{GP}

lost to Matt Horwich by TKO (strikes) in the second round (12/29/07)^{GP}

- Alex Schoenauer (4–5) (LHW)

def Travis Wiuff by submission (heel hook) in the second round (4/29/06)

lost to Jamal Patterson by submission (guillotine choke) in the first round (6/03/06)^{*}

def Kazuhiro Hamanaka by submission (guillotine choke) in the first round (9/09/06)

lost to Aaron Stark by submission (modified guillotine choke) in the second round (11/02/06)

lost to Mike Ciesnolevicz by decision (split) (02/02/07)

def Brian Ebersole by decision (split) (03/17/07)

def Allan Goes by KO (punch) in the first round (06/01/07)

lost to Mike Ciesnolevicz by decision (split) (08/02/07)

lost to Vladimir Matyushenko by decision (unanimous) (11/03/07)^{GP}

- Krzysztof Soszynski (3–4) (HW)

lost to Ben Rothwell by TKO in 1st round (4/29/06)

def Tom Howard by TKO in the first round (9/09/06)

def Devin Cole by submission (armbar) in the second round (11/02/06)

lost to Mike Whitehead by unanimous decision (12/29/06)^{*}

was supposed to fight Ben Rothwell on 2/02/07 but was injured during training. Alternate Matt Thompson took the fight instead.

def Dan Christison by decision (unanimous) (03/17/07)

lost to Reese Andy by decision (split) (06/01/07)

lost to Ben Rothwell by TKO (strikes) in the first round (08/02/07)

- Matt Thompson (0–1) (HW) ALTERNATE

lost to Ben Rothwell by TKO (strikes) in the second round (02/02/07)

=== Former Fighters ===
- John Shackelford (0–1) (LW)

lost to Bart Palaszewski by TKO in 2nd round (4/29/06)

left to fight for Elite XC

- Mike Pyle (1–2) (MW)

lost to Rory Markham by KO in the first round (4/29/06)^{1}

def John Cole by submission (guillotine choke) in the first round (9/09/06)

lost to Matt Horwich by submission (rear naked choke) in the second round (11/02/06)

Left to fight for Elite XC

- Bobby Johnson (0–1)(MW)

lost to Shane Johnson by KO in the third round (9/09/06)^{a}

- M.A. Sotelo (0-0) (MW)

Never showed to match and was replaced by Amir Rahnavardi (4/29/06)

Left to fight for Combat Fighting Championships

- Amir Rahnavardi (0–1) (MW)

lost to Ryan McGivern by unanimous decision (4/29/06)

== 2006 Season Schedule/ Results ==
Date	Round	Opponent	Result
April 29, 2006	First Round	Quad City Silverbacks	L 1-4
September 9, 2006	First Round	Tokyo Sabres	W 5–0
November 2, 2006	Semi Final	Portland Wolfpack	L 2-3

== 2007 Season Schedule/ Results ==
Date	Opponent	Result
February 2, 2007	Quad City Silverbacks	W 3-2
March 17, 2007	San Jose Razorclaws	W 5-0
June 1, 2007	Seattle Tiger Sharks	W 3-2

== 2007 Playoff Schedule/ Results ==
Date	Opponent	Round	Result
August 2, 2007	Quad City Silverbacks	Semifinal	L 1–4
