= New York Pitbulls =

MMA team

New York Pitbulls

The New York Pitbulls were an International Fight League team based in NYC, New York. Coached by Brazilian Jiu Jitsu expert and MMA veteran Renzo Gracie, the Pitbulls were one of four teams competing in the IFL's inaugural season.

== Record/roster ==
The Pitbulls are 17-13 as of August 2007 in team competition.

All records are IFL fights only

^{*}= fought as an intraleague superfight that does not go towards team record

^{a}= fought as an alternate bought that does not go towards team record

^{1}= fought when Heleno was a MW

2007 season

- Erik Owings (3-2) (LW)

def Justin Jones by submission (Guillotine Choke) in the first round (4/29/06)

lost to Chris Horodecki by KO in the first round (6/03/06)^{*}

def Ed West by decision (unanimous) (12/29/06)^{*}

def Peter Kaljevic by submission (rear naked choke) in the second round (2/23/07)

Owings was supposed to face Ryan Schultz on 4/13/07 but was injured during training, thus alternate Joe Sampieri took the fight instead

lost to Wagnney Fabiano by submission (armbar) in the first round (06/16/07)

Owings was supposed to face Savant Young in the IFL Semi Finals but was injured during training, thus alternate Deividas Taurosevicius took the fight instead

- Joe Sampieri (0-2) (LW) (alternate)

lost to Ryan Schultz by decision (unanimous) (4/13/07)

lost to Jason Palacios by RNC (submission) in the first round (08/02/07)^{a}

- Deividas Taurosevicius (2-0) (LW) (alternate)

def Zach George by submission (arm triangle choke) in the first round (4/13/07)^{a}

def Savant Young by decision (unanimous) (08/02/07)

- Delson Heleno (4-2) (WW)

lost to Dennis Hallman by DQ (illegal upkick) (4/29/06)^{1}

def Ben Uker by TKO in the first round (9/23/06)^{a1}

def Mark Miller by decision (unanimous) (2/23/07)

def Mike Dolce by decision (unanimous) (4/13/07)

def Gideon Ray by submission (armbar) in the first round (06/16/07)

lost to Antonio McKee by decision (split) (08/02/07)

- Fabio Leopoldo (3-1) (MW)

def Ryan McGivern by submission in the second round (9/23/06)

def Chris Albandia by submission (guillotine choke) in the first round (2/23/07)

def Gerald Harris by decision (split) (4/13/07)

lost to Brent Beauparlant by TKO (injury) in the third round (06/16/07)

Leopoldo was supposed to fight Dave Phillips in the IFL Semi Finals but was still injured from his fight with Beauparlant, thus alternate Dan Miller took the fight instead

- Dan Miller (1-0) (MW) (alternate)

def Dave Phillips by submission (Guillotine choke) in the first round (08/02/07)

- Jamal Patterson (3-1) (LHW)

def Matt Horwich by submission (rear naked choke) (4/29/06)

def Alex Schoenauer by submission (guillotine Choke) (6/03/06)

lost to Reese Andy by TKO (ref stoppage) (12/29/06)^{*}

Jamal was supposed to face Tim Kennedy on 2/23/07 but was injured. Thus alternate Dante Rivera took the fight instead.

def Matt Horwhich by submission (guillotine choke) in the first round (4/13/07)

Jamal was supposed to face Wojtek Kasowski on 6/16/07 but was injured. Thus alternate Andre Gusmão took the fight instead.

Jamal was supposed to face Vladimir Matyushenko in the IFL semi finals but was still injured, thus alternate Tim Boetsch took the fight instead

- Tim Boetsch (0-1) (LHW) (alternate)

lost to Vladmir Matyushenko by decision (unanimous) (08/02/07)

- Dante Rivera (1-1) (LHW) (alternate)

lost to Tim Kennedy by submission (strikes) in the second round (2/23/07)

def Nissim Levy by TKO (strikes) in the third round (08/02/07)^{*}

- Andre Gusmão (3-0) (LHW) (alternate)

def Mike Ciesnolevicz by TKO in the second round (9/23/06)

def Brent Beauparlant by decision (unanimous) (12/29/06)^{*}

def Wojtek Kasowski by submission (rear naked choke) in the first round (06/16/07)

- Bryan Vetell (2-2) (HW)

lost to Ben Rothwell by KO in the first round (9/23/06)

def Mo Fowzi by submission (key lock) in the first round (2/23/07)

lost to Devin Cole by KO (strikes) in the first round (4/13/07)

Vetell was supposed to fight Rafael Feijao but was under KO suspension for his previous lost. Thus alternate Marcio Cruz took the fight instead.

def Wayne Cole by decision (unanimous) (08/02/07)

- Marcio Cruz (1-0) (HW) (alternate)

def Rafael Reijao by DQ (illegal upkick) in the third round (06/16/07)

=== Former fighters ===
- Marcio Feitosa (0-1) (LW)

lost to Bart Palaszewski by decision (split) (9/23/06)

- Marcelo Azevedo (0-1) (WW)

lost to Rory Markham by TKO in the first round (9/23/06)

- Gustavo Machado (0-1) (WW)

lost to Brad Blackburn by split decision (4/29/06)

- Carlos Cline (0-1) (HW)

lost to Devin Cole by unanimous decision (4/29/06)

== 2006 season results ==
Date	Round	Opponent	Result
April 29, 2006	First Round	Seattle Tiger Sharks	L 2-3
September 23, 2006	First Round	Quad City Silverbacks	L 2-3

== 2007 season results ==
Date	Opponent	Results
February 23, 2007	Chicago Red Bears	W 4-1
April 13, 2007	Portland Wolfpack	W 3-2
June 16, 2007	Toronto Dragons	W 3-2

== 2007 playoffs results ==
Date	Opponent	Round	Result
August 2, 2007	Tokyo Sabres	Semi-Final	W 3-2
September 20, 2007	Quad City Silverbacks	Final	L 2-3
