= Chris Horodecki =

Canadian mixed martial artist

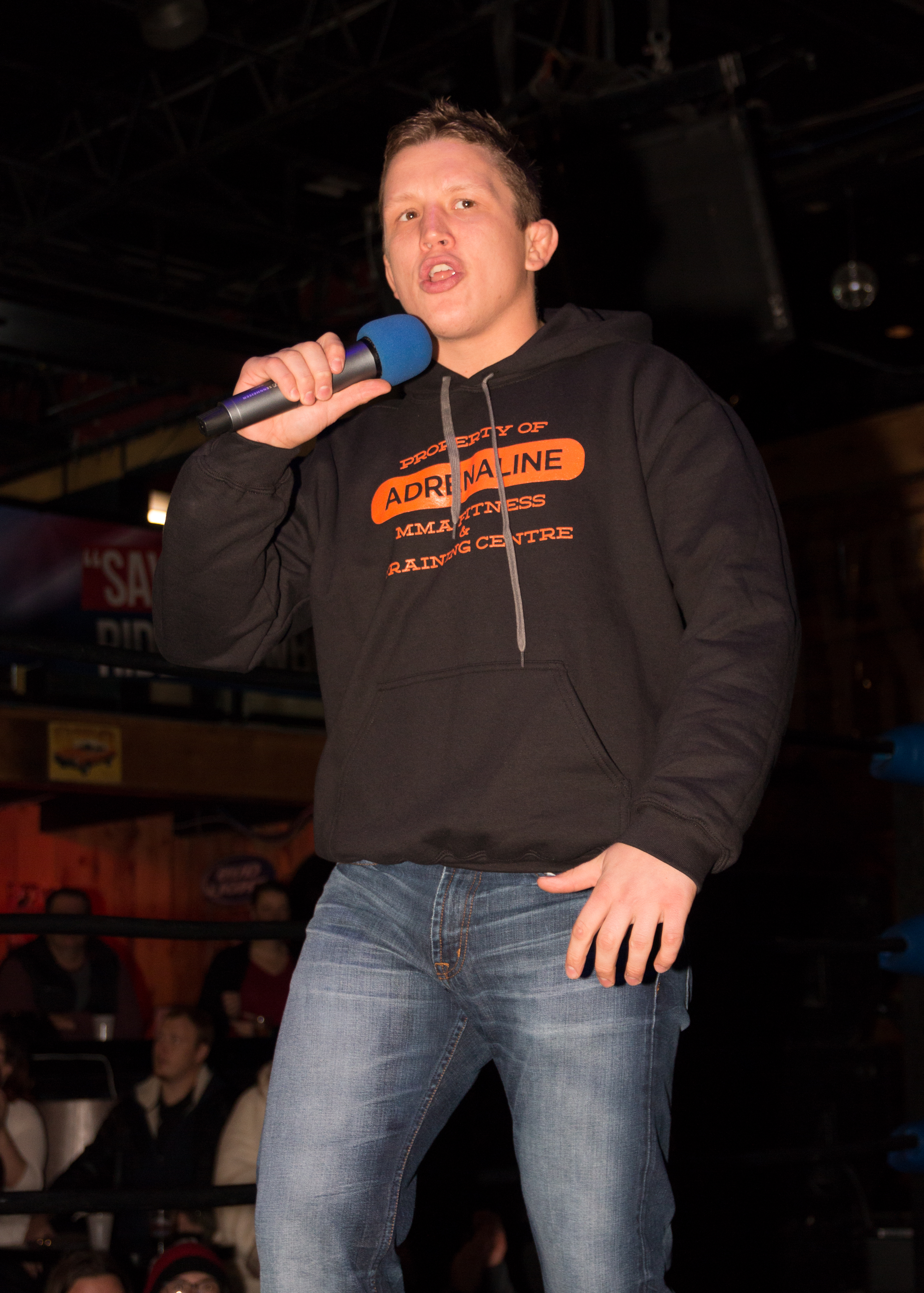
- Horodecki at an indy wrestling show in London, ON
- Born: September 24, 1987 (age 39); London, Ontario, Canada
- Other names: The Polish Hammer
- Height: 5 ft 8 in (1.73 m)
- Weight: 155 lb (70 kg; 11.1 st)
- Division: Lightweight
- Reach: 69.5 in (177 cm)
- Stance: Orthodox
- Fighting out of: London, Ontario, Canada
- Team: Team Tompkins; Team Adrenaline
- Trainer: Shawn Tompkins

Mixed martial arts record
- Total: 30
- Wins: 21
- By knockout: 7
- By submission: 4
- By decision: 10
- Losses: 7
- By knockout: 4
- By submission: 2
- By decision: 1
- Draws: 1
- No contests: 1

Other information
- Mixed martial arts record from Sherdog

Christopher Horodecki (born September 24, 1987) is a Polish-Canadian mixed martial artist. He has competed for the WEC, the IFL, Bellator, TKO Major League MMA, and Palace Fighting Championship.

== Background ==
Horodecki was born in London, Ontario, Canada. At age 13, he attended a seminar run by Shawn Tompkins in Port Stanley and became "addicted" to mixed martial arts.

== Mixed martial arts career ==
=== International Fight League ===
Chris made his debut knocking out Erik Owings at IFL: Championship 2006. He then scored victories over Ed West, Ryan Schultz, Bart Palaszewski, Josh Odom and Shad Lierley. Chris then defeated Bart Palaszewski again that earned him a spot in the finals for the lightweight title.

Horodecki was then defeated by Ryan Schultz in the finals of the 2007 IFL Grand Prix.

=== Affliction ===
Chris was originally scheduled to fight Dan Lauzon at Affliction: Day of Reckoning but was denied his license for failing his physical. Chris then suffered from a bulging disc in his neck and has lost about 80% of his strength in his right arm. The fight was rescheduled to the next event, Affliction: Trilogy but the event was canceled.

=== World Extreme Cagefighting ===
Horodecki's coach Shawn Tompkins announced on October 19, 2009, that Chris had agreed on a contract with World Extreme Cagefighting.

He made his WEC debut against Anthony Njokuani on December 19, 2009, at WEC 45. Horodecki lost via first-round TKO, after Chris´ attempt to create distance by turning his back and running away, his opponent Njokuani caught him with a high kick to the head and followed up with punches on the ground.

Horodecki was expected to face Ed Ratcliff on June 20, 2010, at WEC 49, but just days before the event, Ratcliff pulled out of the event for undisclosed reasons. Horodecki instead faced WEC newcomer Danny Downes and won the fight via submission in the third round.

The fight between Horodecki and Ratcliff eventually took place on September 30, 2010, at WEC 51. He won the fight via split decision.

Horodecki faced Donald Cerrone on December 16, 2010, at WEC 53. He lost the fight via submission in the second round and was subsequently released from the promotion.

=== Bellator Fighting Championships ===
Horodecki made his Bellator debut against Chris Saunders at Bellator 47. He won the fight via unanimous decision.

On November 12, 2011, Horodecki fought Mike Corey at Bellator 57 the bout ended in a Draw.

On April 6, 2012, Horodecki was defeated by Mike Richman at Bellator 64 in round one by knockout due to punches.

On May 9, 2014, Horodecki fought at Bellator 119 in Ontario, Canada. Horodecki's opponent was announced to be Marlon Sandro. He lost via unanimous decision.

=== Independent Promotions ===
Chris Horodecki was scheduled to take on Kalvin Hackney in Sarnia, Ontario on October 19, in the Score Fighting Series. Prior to the fight Hackney was injured, and Horodecki instead was matched with Brad Cardinal. Cardinal and Horodecki clashed heads in the first round, causing a severe cut to Horodecki. The doctor stopped the fight after the first round, and the fight was subsequently declared a no contest.

With a lack of Ontario-based MMA events, Chris Horodecki accepted to fight Tim Smith at XFFC 2 in Grande Prairie, Alberta on July 20, 2013. Horodecki will return to the Lightweight division for a XFFC Lightweight Title fight. Horodecki won via arm triangle choke in round one to win the XFFC Lightweight Championship.

Chris will fight in his hometown of London, Ontario against Jason Dent on October 26, 2013, at Provincial Fighting Championship 1. Unfortunately, Jason Dent pulled out of the fight and Frank Caraballo was named as a replacement. Horodecki won via unanimous decision.

=== World Series of Fighting ===
Chris Horodecki signed with the World Series of Fighting and was supposed to appear on the WSOF 7 event in Vancouver, British Columbia on December 7, 2013. However, Horodecki never appeared on the WSOF 7 event.

Horodecki instead made his debut at WSOF 14 against Luis Huete on October 11, 2014, in Edmonton, Alberta. He won the fight via unanimous decision.

In his next fight for the promotion, Horodecki faced Lance Palmer for the WSOF Featherweight Championship on June 5, 2015, in the main event at WSOF 21. He lost the fight via submission in the first round.

== Personal life ==
Horodecki was also studying to become a paramedic.

== Championships and accomplishments ==
- Xcessive Force Fighting Championship
  - XFFC Lightweight Championship (One time)

== Mixed martial arts record ==
Professional record breakdown
30 matches	21 wins	7 losses
By knockout	7	4
By submission	4	2
By decision	10	1
Draws	1	
No contests	1	

Res.	Record	Opponent	Method	Event	Date	Round	Time	Location	Notes
Loss	21–7–1 (1)	Derek Gauthier	KO (punches)	TKO 36: Resurrection	November 4, 2016	1	0:35	Montreal, Quebec, Canada	
Loss	21–6–1 (1)	Lance Palmer	Submission (neck crank)	WSOF 21	June 5, 2015	1	4:28	Edmonton, Alberta, Canada	For the WSOF Featherweight Championship
Win	21–5–1 (1)	Luis Huete	Decision (unanimous)	WSOF 14	October 11, 2014	3	5:00	Edmonton, Alberta, Canada	
Loss	20–5–1 (1)	Marlon Sandro	Decision (unanimous)	Bellator 119	May 9, 2014	3	5:00	Rama, Ontario Canada	
Win	20–4–1 (1)	Frank Caraballo	Decision (unanimous)	PFC: Unrivaled	October 26, 2013	3	5:00	London, Ontario, Canada	
Win	19–4–1 (1)	Tim Smith	Submission (arm-triangle choke)	XFFC 2	July 20, 2013	1	2:56	Grande Prairie, Alberta, Canada	Won XFFC Lightweight Championship.
NC	18–4–1 (1)	Brad Cardinal	NC (accidental head clash)	Score Fighting Series 6	October 19, 2012	1	1:23	Sarnia, Ontario, Canada	Horodecki was cut by head clashing.
Loss	18–4–1	Mike Richman	KO (punches)	Bellator 64	April 6, 2012	1	1:23	Windsor, Ontario, Canada	
Draw	18–3–1	Mike Corey	Draw (majority)	Bellator 57	November 12, 2011	3	5:00	Rama, Ontario, Canada	
Win	18–3	Chris Saunders	Decision (unanimous)	Bellator 47	July 23, 2011	3	5:00	Rama, Ontario, Canada	Bellator Debut.
Win	17–3	David Castillo	Submission (rear-naked choke)	MMA 1: The Reckoning	April 2, 2011	1	4:24	Rama, Ontario, Canada	
Loss	16–3	Donald Cerrone	Submission (triangle choke)	WEC 53	December 16, 2010	2	2:43	Glendale, Arizona, United States	
Win	16–2	Ed Ratcliff	Decision (split)	WEC 51	September 30, 2010	3	5:00	Broomfield, Colorado, United States	
Win	15–2	Danny Downes	Submission (rear-naked choke)	WEC 49	June 20, 2010	3	1:09	Edmonton, Alberta, Canada	
Loss	14–2	Anthony Njokuani	TKO (head kick and punches)	WEC 45	December 19, 2009	1	3:33	Las Vegas, Nevada, United States	
Win	14–1	William Sriyapai	Submission (rear-naked choke)	Ultimate Chaos	June 27, 2009	1	4:02	Biloxi, Mississippi, United States	
Win	13–1	Nate Lamotte	Decision (unanimous)	IFL: East Rutherford	April 4, 2008	3	5:00	East Rutherford, New Jersey, United States	
Loss	12–1	Ryan Schultz	TKO (punches)	IFL: World Grand Prix	December 29, 2007	1	2:51	Uncasville, Connecticut, United States	For the inaugural IFL Lightweight Championship.
Win	12–0	Bart Palaszewski	Decision (split)	IFL: World Grand Prix	November 3, 2007	3	4:00	Hoffman Estates, Illinois, United States	World Grand Prix Semi-Finals.
Win	11–0	Shad Lierley	Decision (unanimous)	IFL: Everett	June 1, 2007	3	4:00	Everett, Washington, United States	
Win	10–0	Josh Odom	Decision (unanimous)	IFL: Los Angeles	March 17, 2007	3	4:00	Los Angeles, California, United States	
Win	9–0	Bart Palaszewski	Decision (split)	IFL: Houston	February 2, 2007	3	4:00	Houston, Texas, United States	
Win	8–0	Ryan Schultz	TKO (head kick and punches)	IFL: World Championship Semi-Finals	November 2, 2006	2	0:24	Portland, Oregon, United States	
Win	7–0	Ed West	Decision (unanimous)	IFL: Portland	September 9, 2006	3	4:00	Portland, Oregon, United States	
Win	6–0	Erik Owings	KO (head kick)	IFL: Championship 2006	June 3, 2006	1	4:00	Atlantic City, New Jersey, United States	
Win	5–0	Mike Bell	TKO (punches)	TKO Major League MMA 25: Confrontation	May 5, 2006	2	2:38	Montreal, Quebec, Canada	
Win	4–0	Dave Pariseau	TKO (punches)	TKO 24: Eruption	January 28, 2006	1	2:48	Laval, Quebec, Canada	
Win	3–0	Dave Goulet	KO (head kick)	TKO 23: Extreme	November 5, 2005	3		Victoriaville, Quebec, Canada	
Win	2–0	Stephane Laliberte	TKO (punches)	TKO 22: Lionheart	September 30, 2005	2	2:52	Montreal, Quebec, Canada	
Win	1–0	Matt McDonald	TKO (doctor stoppage)	UCW 2 - Caged Inferno	June 18, 2005	3	1:21	Winnipeg, Manitoba, Canada	

== See also ==
- List of Bellator MMA alumni
