= Mike Russow =

American mixed martial arts fighter

- Born: November 9, 1976 (age 49); Kankakee, Illinois, United States
- Height: 6 ft 1 in (1.85 m)
- Weight: 256 lb (116 kg; 18.3 st)
- Division: Heavyweight (265 lb)
- Reach: 73 in (190 cm)
- Fighting out of: Alexandria, Minnesota, United States
- Team: DeathClutch
- Wrestling: NJCAA Division I Wrestler
- Years active: 1998, 2006–2013 (MMA)

Mixed martial arts record
- Total: 19
- Wins: 15
- By knockout: 4
- By submission: 8
- By decision: 3
- Losses: 3
- By knockout: 2
- By submission: 1
- No contests: 1

Other information
- Mixed martial arts record from Sherdog

Michael Earl Russow (born November 9, 1976) is a retired American professional mixed martial artist who competed in the heavyweight division. Having made his professional debut in 1998, Russow has formerly competed for the UFC, Adrenaline MMA, PRIDE FC, and also participated in the Yarennoka! event in the Saitama Super Arena in Japan. He is perhaps best known for his upset victory over Todd Duffee.

== Mixed martial arts career ==
=== Background ===
Russow is from Kankakee, Illinois and was a state wrestling champion in high school for the Heavyweight division. He also attended college at Eastern Illinois University and earned a degree in sociology. His first fight was in 1998.

=== Ultimate Fighting Championship ===
Russow signed with the UFC in 2009 and made his debut against Justin McCully at UFC 102. He won via unanimous decision (29–28, 30–26, and 30–27).

Russow then defeated Todd Duffee via third round KO at UFC 114. Russow absorbed heavy punishment from Duffee during the course of the fight but hung on late into the third and final round. Russow then connected with a hard straight right hand, taking Duffee and the fans in attendance by surprise.

Russow defeated TUF 10 alum and DeathClutch teammate Jon Madsen on March 26, 2011, at UFC Fight Night 24 via TKO; with that win he improved his winning streak to ten.

Russow was expected to face Dave Herman on October 8, 2011, at UFC 136. However, the bout was cancelled after Herman failed his preliminary drug test in which he tested positive for marijuana.

Russow faced John Olav Einemo on January 28, 2012, at UFC on Fox: Evans vs. Davis and won via unanimous decision (29–28, 29–28, and 30–27).

Russow faced Fabrício Werdum on June 23, 2012, at UFC 147. Russow was defeated by Werdum via TKO at 2:28 of round 1.

Russow faced Shawn Jordan on January 26, 2013, at UFC on Fox: Johnson vs. Dodson. Despite a strong first round, Russow lost to Jordan by TKO in the second round and was subsequently released from the promotion.

=== World Series of Fighting ===
On October 6, 2013, it was announced that Russow has signed with World Series of Fighting.

Since his signing with WSOF, Russow retired from MMA.

== Personal life ==
Russow and his wife have a daughter. Russow is also a police officer in his hometown of Chicago.

== Championships and accomplishments ==
=== Mixed martial arts ===
- Ultimate Fighting Championship
  - Knockout of the Night (One time) vs. Todd Duffee
  - UFC.com Awards
    - 2010: Ranked #4 Knockout of the Year, Best Knockout of the 1HY & Ranked #2 Upset of the Year vs. Todd Duffee

=== Amateur wrestling ===
- National Junior College Athletic Association
  - NJCAA All-American (1997)
- Illinois High School Association
  - IHSA Class AA High School State Championship (1995)
  - IHSA Class AA High School State Championship 3rd Place (1993, 1994)
  - IHSA Class AA All-State (1993, 1994, 1995)

== Mixed martial arts record ==
Professional record breakdown
19 matches	15 wins	3 losses
By knockout	4	2
By submission	8	1
By decision	3	0
No contests	1	

Res.	Record	Opponent	Method	Event	Date	Round	Time	Location	Notes
Loss	15–3 (1)	Shawn Jordan	TKO (punches)	UFC on Fox: Johnson vs. Dodson	January 26, 2013	2	3:48	Chicago, Illinois, United States	
Loss	15–2 (1)	Fabrício Werdum	TKO (punches)	UFC 147	June 23, 2012	1	2:28	Belo Horizonte, Minas Gerais, Brazil	
Win	15–1 (1)	John-Olav Einemo	Decision (unanimous)	UFC on Fox: Evans vs. Davis	January 28, 2012	3	5:00	Chicago, Illinois, United States	
Win	14–1 (1)	Jon Madsen	TKO (doctor stoppage)	UFC Fight Night: Nogueira vs. Davis	March 26, 2011	2	5:00	Seattle, Washington, United States	Stoppage due to eye injury.
Win	13–1 (1)	Todd Duffee	KO (punch)	UFC 114	May 29, 2010	3	2:32	Las Vegas, Nevada, United States	Knockout of the Night.
Win	12–1 (1)	Justin McCully	Decision (unanimous)	UFC 102	August 29, 2009	3	5:00	Portland, Oregon, United States	
Win	11–1 (1)	Braden Bice	Submission (north-south choke)	Adrenaline MMA 2: Miletich vs. Denny	December 11, 2008	1	1:13	Moline, Illinois, United States	
Win	10–1 (1)	Jason Guida	Submission (guillotine choke)	Adrenaline MMA: Guida vs. Russow	June 14, 2008	1	2:13	Hoffman Estates, Illinois, United States	
Win	9–1 (1)	Roman Zentsov	Submission (north-south choke)	Yarennoka!	December 31, 2007	1	2:58	Saitama, Saitama, Japan	
Win	8–1 (1)	Steve Campbell	Submission (arm-triangle choke)	XFO 21	December 1, 2007	2	4:32	Lakemoor, Illinois, United States	
Win	7–1 (1)	Pat Harmon	KO (punch)	Bourbon Street Brawl 4	July 25, 2007	1	2:10	Chicago, Illinois, United States	
Win	6–1 (1)	Demian Decorah	Submission (kimura)	XFO 18	June 30, 2007	1	2:54	Wisconsin Dells, Wisconsin, United States	
Win	5–1 (1)	Scott Harper	Submission (americana)	XFO 16	May 5, 2007	1	0:32	Lakemoor, Illinois, United States	
Loss	4–1 (1)	Sergei Kharitonov	Submission (armbar)	Pride 33	February 24, 2007	1	3:46	Las Vegas, Nevada, United States	
Win	4–0 (1)	Steve Conkel	Submission (rear-naked choke)	Bourbon Street Brawl 2	January 24, 2007	1	1:00	Chicago, Illinois, United States	
Win	3–0 (1)	Chris Harrison	Submission (americana)	XFO 14	December 9, 2006	1	1:11	Lakemoor, Illinois, United States	
Win	2–0 (1)	Brandon Quigley	KO (punches)	Combat: Do Fighting Challenge 7	April 22, 2006	1	0:18	Cicero, Illinois, United States	
NC	1–0 (1)	Ed Meyer	NC	Combat: Do Fighting Challenge 6	February 25, 2006	N/A	N/A	Mokena, Illinois, United States	
Win	1–0	Nate Schroeder	Decision (unanimous)	JKD: Challenge 1	April 25, 1998	3	5:00	Chicago, Illinois, United States	
