= Ben Rothwell =

American mixed martial artist

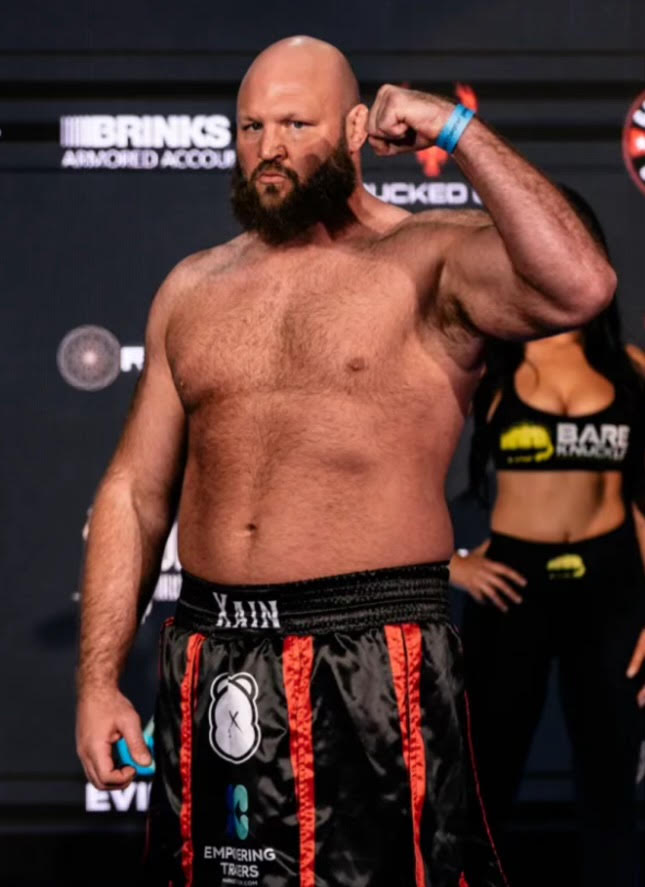
- Ben Rothwell at the Bare Knuckle Fighting Championship in 2024
- Born: Ben Rothwell; October 17, 1981 (age 45); Kenosha, Wisconsin, U.S.
- Other names: Big Ben, King of Kenosha
- Height: 6 ft 4 in (193 cm)
- Weight: 265 lb (120 kg; 18 st 13 lb)
- Division: Heavyweight
- Reach: 81 in (206 cm)
- Fighting out of: Kenosha, Wisconsin, U.S.
- Team: Rothwell MMA; Miletich Fighting Systems (2004–2009); Roufusport (2004–2010)
- Rank: Black Belt MFS Miletich Fighting Systems. Black Belt Roufus Sports. Purple Belt in Brazilian Jiu-Jitsu
- Years active: 2001–present (MMA)

Kickboxing record
- Total: 3
- Wins: 3
- Losses: 0

Mixed martial arts record
- Total: 53
- Wins: 39
- By knockout: 28
- By submission: 7
- By decision: 4
- Losses: 14
- By knockout: 5
- By submission: 2
- By decision: 7

Other information
- Mixed martial arts record from Sherdog
- Last updated on: March 8, 2010

Ben Rothwell (born October 17, 1981) is an American mixed martial artist and bare-knuckle boxer who competes as a Heavyweight and is the former BKFC Heavyweight World Champion. He most notably had a 17 bout stint in the Ultimate Fighting Championship and competed for the Quad Cities Silverbacks of the IFL where he held an undefeated 9–0 record before leaving the promotion due to a contract dispute. He has also had one-fight stints in Affliction, M-1 Global, and King of the Cage. He also competed for the World Series of Fighting and Absolute Championship Berkut.

Since his departure from the UFC in 2022, Rothwell has competed in the Heavyweight division of the Bare Knuckle Fighting Championship, where he is a former BKFC Heavyweight Champion. As of April 13, 2026, he is #2 in the heavyweight rankings.

== Background ==
Rothwell is from Kenosha, Wisconsin, and both of his parents work in the restaurant business. His parents own a catering company. He is of Norwegian and Irish descent. Rothwell was an active child but suffered a bout with spinal meningitis when he was six years old. He was in a coma and temporarily blind, while the disease made him almost obese. The young Rothwell, who struggled with his weight and identity in his adolescent years, was also troubled growing up and was often involved in fighting and violence at Westosha Central High School in Paddock Lake. By the time he was a junior in high school, Rothwell knew that he enjoyed fighting, and in 1999, at the age of 17, he began learning self-defense. In July of that same year, after he had been in three professional fights, he and a friend were involved in a car accident with a drunk driver. Rothwell's friend, who was 19 years old, died two weeks later, and Rothwell suffered a significant head injury, in addition to broken ribs. The event changed Rothwell's life, causing him to feel as though he has a purpose to complete.

== Mixed martial arts career ==
=== Early career ===
Rothwell began his training in September 1999, before joining Miletich Fighting Systems in 2002.

Rothwell made his professional debut in early 2001 in his home state of Wisconsin and dominated his opponent, winning by TKO only 21 seconds into the fight. He then won his next three fights, all under two minutes into the first round and all with strikes. Rothwell then faced future two-time UFC Heavyweight Champion and fellow Miletich Fighting Systems fighter, Tim Sylvia. Rothwell was handed his first career loss in a decision. However, he bounced back and won his next seven fights, all by submission or TKO, before a unanimous decision loss to Mike Whitehead.

After defeating former King of the Cage Super Heavyweight Champion, Dan Bobish by knockout, Rothwell was soon invited to compete in the International Fight League to fight for the Quad City Silverbacks, coached by the legendary Pat Miletich. Like several other fighters in the promotion, Rothwell was competing for the coach who he trained regularly.

=== International Fight League ===
On April 29, 2006, Rothwell made his IFL debut against future UFC veteran, the Polish-Canadian fighter, Krzysztof Soszynski. In the first round, Soszynski surprisingly decided to exchange strikes with Rothwell, and landed a left uppercut and held his own until he was knocked down by a short left hook from Rothwell, who then slammed Soszynski to the canvas. After working from side control and then standing again, Rothwell landed a series of punches at the end of the round, that knocked down Soszynski, and then followed this up with more punches to his downed opponent. Despite the round ending, referee Dan Miragliotta called a stop to the contest, granting Rothwell the win via TKO.

After racking up four consecutive IFL wins, he fought future The Ultimate Fighter: Heavyweights winner and IFL Heavyweight Champion Roy Nelson, winning via split decision.

His next fight was a rematch from almost five years earlier against veteran Travis Fulton, owner of 195 career victories. Three minutes into the second round, Rothwell secured a kimura, causing Fulton to submit.

Rothwell then met Krzysztof Soszynski in a rematch of his IFL debut. Rothwell once again won via TKO, only 13 seconds into the bout.

His last fight in the IFL came against former UFC Heavyweight Champion, Ricco Rodriguez in the team finals. After controlling the fight and displaying superior striking, Rothwell won the fight via unanimous decision. However, the Silverbacks fell short of a victory and lost the championship to Renzo Gracie's New York Pitbulls. This was Rothwell's last appearance in the IFL, as he eventually left the organization due to a contract dispute.

During his time in the IFL, Rothwell had a 9–0 record.

=== Affliction ===
After leaving the IFL, Rothwell joined Affliction where he appeared in only one bout, against former UFC Heavyweight Champion Andrei Arlovski, Rothwell lost the fight via knockout due to an uppercut in the final round. This ended Rothwell's 13-fight win streak and gave him his first defeat in over three years.

=== Ultimate Fighting Championship ===
Rothwell made his UFC debut on October 24, 2009, at UFC 104 against undefeated Cain Velasquez losing via TKO one minute into round two. The stoppage was controversial because Rothwell seemed to be getting to his feet as Steve Mazzagatti stopped the fight. Rothwell was visibly upset with Mazzagatti's decision to stop the fight. After the fight, UFC president Dana White stated that Mazzagatti was the "worst referee in the history of combat sports".

Rothwell was expected to face Mirko Filipović on February 21, 2010, at UFC 110. However, Rothwell had to withdraw from the event, just days prior, due to an illness and was replaced by Anthony Perosh.

Rothwell then fought Gilbert Yvel on June 15, 2010, at UFC 115 where he won by unanimous decision (30–27, 29–28, and 29–28). Rothwell tore his ACL during his first takedown attempt, which required post-fight surgery. Rothwell also suffered a deviated septum from a head kick during the first round.

After an extended layoff, Rothwell fought Mark Hunt on September 24, 2011, at UFC 135. He lost the fight via unanimous decision.

Rothwell then faced Brendan Schaub on April 21, 2012, at UFC 145. He won the fight via knockout in round one. Rothwell also earned Knockout of the Night honors for his performance.

Rothwell was expected to face Travis Browne at UFC on Fox: Shogun vs. Vera, but pulled out due to an injury

Rothwell faced Gabriel Gonzaga on January 19, 2013, at UFC on FX: Belfort vs. Bisping He lost the fight via submission in the second round.

Rothwell faced Brandon Vera at UFC 164 on August 31, 2013. He won the fight via TKO by punches in round three. Subsequent to the bout, Rothwell tested positive for elevated testosterone levels. The UFC suspended Rothwell for nine months, despite the Wisconsin commission only issuing him with an administrative warning.

Rothwell was briefly linked to a bout with Ruslan Magomedov for on August 30, 2014, at UFC 177. However, on July 9, the UFC announced he would face Alistair Overeem on September 5, 2014, at UFC Fight Night 50. Rothwell won the fight via TKO in the first round. The win also earned Rothwell his first Performance of the Night bonus award.

Rothwell faced Matt Mitrione on June 6, 2015, at UFC Fight Night 68. He won the fight via submission in the first round, the first submission win of his UFC career.

Rothwell was expected to face Stipe Miocic on October 24, 2015, at UFC Fight Night 76. However, Miocic pulled out of the fight on October 13 citing injury. Subsequently, Rothwell was removed from the card the following day after the promotion deemed that a suitable opponent could not be arranged on short notice.

Rothwell next faced Josh Barnett on January 30, 2016, at UFC on Fox 18. He won the fight in the second round due to a guillotine choke, making Rothwell the only fighter to ever stop Barnett with a submission hold during Barnett's lengthy MMA career. The win also earned Rothwell his second Performance of the Night bonus award.

Rothwell faced Junior dos Santos on April 10, 2016, at UFC Fight Night 86. He lost the fight via unanimous decision.

Rothwell was expected to face Fabrício Werdum on September 10, 2016, at UFC 203. However, Rothwell pulled out of the fight on August 11 citing a knee injury and was replaced by Travis Browne.

The bout with Werdum was rescheduled and expected to take place on May 13, 2017, at UFC 211. However, the bout was canceled due to Rothwell failing a drug test. On April 6, 2018, it was announced Rothwell had accepted a two-year suspension from USADA, retroactive to February 6, 2017.

Having served his suspension, Rothwell returned to face Blagoy Ivanov on March 9, 2019, at UFC Fight Night 146. He lost the fight by unanimous decision.

A rematch with Andrei Arlovski took place on July 20, 2019, at UFC on ESPN 4. He lost the fight via unanimous decision.

Rothwell faced Stefan Struve on December 7, 2019, at UFC on ESPN 7. He won the fight via technical knockout in round two. The finish was controversial as Rothwell had accidentally hit Struve in the groin twice and was docked one point for these infractions in the second round. The referee encouraged the compromised Struve to continue, resulting in a finish for Rothwell late in the second round.

Rothwell was scheduled to face Gian Villante on April 18, 2020, at UFC 249. However, the event and Rothwell's scheduled bout against Villante was canceled due to the COVID-19 pandemic.

Rothwell faced Ovince Saint Preux at UFC Fight Night: Smith vs. Teixeira on May 13, 2020. He won the fight via split decision.

Rothwell faced Marcin Tybura on October 11, 2020 at UFC Fight Night 179. He lost the fight via unanimous decision.

Rothwell was scheduled to face Philipe Lins on March 13, 2021, at UFC Fight Night 187. However, during the week leading up to the event the bout was removed from the card due to undisclosed reasons. The pairing remained intact and the bout was rescheduled on May 8, 2021, at UFC on ESPN 24. While Rothwell made weight without issue, Lins never showed up to the weigh-ins and withdrew from the bout due to an illness. The bout was rescheduled again for May 22, 2021, at UFC Fight Night: Font vs. Garbrandt. However, yet again, Lins was pulled from the event for undisclosed reason and he was replaced by newcomer Askhar Mozharov. Just hours later, the Ukrainian announced he would not be able to get a visa in time for the event, and he was replaced by Chris Barnett. He won the fight via guillotine choke submission in the second round.

Rothwell faced Marcos Rogério de Lima on November 13, 2021, at UFC Fight Night 197. After Rothwell was stunned multiple times on the feet, referee Herb Dean stepped in to stop the fight, though he allowed Rothwell to attempt a takedown before officially calling off the fight as a TKO win for Lima.

Rothwell was scheduled to face Alexander Gustafsson on May 21, 2022, at UFC Fight Night 206. However, at the end of March, it was announced that Rothwell asked for his release and it was granted from the UFC.

== Bare-knuckle boxing ==
=== Bare Knuckle Fighting Championship ===
On April 25, 2022, it was announced that Rothwell joined Bare Knuckle Fighting Championship. He won his first two fights with the promotion.

In his third fight for the promotion, Rothwell was scheduled to face Todd Duffee at BKFC 56 on December 2, 2023. However, on November 30, it was announced the bout was cancelled due to Rothwell having an illness. The fight against Duffee was rescheduled for BKFC Knucklemania IV in Los Angeles on April 27, 2024. Rothwell won the fight by technical knockout after Duffee was knocked down and injured in the first round.

Rothwell competed for the BKFC Heavyweight Championship against champion Mick Terrill on January 25, 2025 at BKFC Knucklemania V. He won the championship by knockout in the first round. This fight earned him another Knockout of the Night award.

Rothwell was scheduled to face Alex Simon at BKFC 79 at RAC Arena in Perth, Australia, on July 19, 2025. However, the event was removed for unknown reasons.

Rothwell attempted to defend his BKFC World Heavyweight Championship against Andrei Arlovski on February 7, 2026 at BKFC Knucklemania VI. The bout was their first meeting in bare‑knuckle boxing after two previous fights in mixed martial arts. Rothwell lost the championship by technical knockout due to a doctor stoppage in the third round.

== Personal life ==
Rothwell attended Waukesha County Technical College, where he earned a technical degree in collision repair. Aside from working at his parents' restaurant, he also worked at a body shop and as a labor union construction worker in Chicago, Illinois.

Rothwell is married and has 2 daughters and a son. Currently, Rothwell and his wife own Rothwell Mixed Martial Arts in Kenosha, Wisconsin. Rothwell MMA, established in 2011, teaches MMA, kickboxing, boxing, Muay Thai, Brazilian jiu-jitsu, wrestling, self-defense, yoga, and fitness to children and adults of all ages and experience levels. Rothwell is also the head coach for an MMA competition team of 30 amateur and professional MMA fighters. They often compete as a team at Wisconsin Xtreme Cage Fighting (WXCF) events at Racine Memorial Hall.

== Championships and accomplishments ==
=== Mixed martial arts ===
- Ultimate Fighting Championship
  - Knockout of the Night (One time) vs. Brendan Schaub
  - Performance of the Night (Two times) vs. Alistair Overeem, Josh Barnett
  - UFC.com Awards
    - 2014: Ranked #5 Upset of the Year vs. Alistair Overeem
    - 2016: Submission of the Year vs. Josh Barnett
- United States Mixed Martial Arts
  - USMMA Heavyweight Championship (One time; first)
- Forbes
  - 2016 UFC Submission of the Year vs. Josh Barnett at UFC on Fox: Johnson vs. Bader
- Bloody Elbow
  - 2016 Submission of the Year vs. Josh Barnett at UFC on Fox: Johnson vs. Bader
- MMADNA.nl
  - 2016 Submission of the Year vs. Josh Barnett at UFC on Fox: Johnson vs. Bader

=== Bare-knuckle boxing ===
- Bare Knuckle Fighting Championship
- BKFC World Heavyweight Championship (One time)
  - Knockout of the Night (Two times) vs. Bobo O'Bannon and Mick Terrill

== Mixed martial arts record ==
Professional record breakdown
53 matches	39 wins	14 losses
By knockout	28	5
By submission	7	2
By decision	4	7

Res.	Record	Opponent	Method	Event	Date	Round	Time	Location	Notes
Loss	39–14	Marcos Rogério de Lima	TKO (punches)	UFC Fight Night: Holloway vs. Rodríguez	November 13, 2021	1	0:32	Las Vegas, Nevada, United States	
Win	39–13	Chris Barnett	Submission (guillotine choke)	UFC Fight Night: Font vs. Garbrandt	May 22, 2021	2	2:07	Las Vegas, Nevada, United States	
Loss	38–13	Marcin Tybura	Decision (unanimous)	UFC Fight Night: Moraes vs. Sandhagen	October 11, 2020	3	5:00	Abu Dhabi, United Arab Emirates	
Win	38–12	Ovince Saint Preux	Decision (split)	UFC Fight Night: Smith vs. Teixeira	May 13, 2020	3	5:00	Jacksonville, Florida, United States	
Win	37–12	Stefan Struve	TKO (punches)	UFC on ESPN: Overeem vs. Rozenstruik	December 7, 2019	2	4:57	Washington, D.C., United States	
Loss	36–12	Andrei Arlovski	Decision (unanimous)	UFC on ESPN: dos Anjos vs. Edwards	July 20, 2019	3	5:00	San Antonio, Texas, United States	
Loss	36–11	Blagoy Ivanov	Decision (unanimous)	UFC Fight Night: Lewis vs. dos Santos	March 9, 2019	3	5:00	Wichita, Kansas, United States	
Loss	36–10	Junior dos Santos	Decision (unanimous)	UFC Fight Night: Rothwell vs. dos Santos	April 10, 2016	5	5:00	Zagreb, Croatia	
Win	36–9	Josh Barnett	Submission (guillotine choke)	UFC on Fox: Johnson vs. Bader	January 30, 2016	2	3:48	Newark, New Jersey, United States	Performance of the Night. Submission of the Year.
Win	35–9	Matt Mitrione	Submission (guillotine choke)	UFC Fight Night: Boetsch vs. Henderson	June 6, 2015	1	1:54	New Orleans, Louisiana, United States	
Win	34–9	Alistair Overeem	TKO (punches)	UFC Fight Night: Jacare vs. Mousasi	September 5, 2014	1	2:19	Mashantucket, Connecticut, United States	Performance of the Night.
Win	33–9	Brandon Vera	TKO (punches)	UFC 164	August 31, 2013	3	1:54	Milwaukee, Wisconsin, United States	Rothwell suspended after testing positive for elevated testosterone levels.
Loss	32–9	Gabriel Gonzaga	Submission (guillotine choke)	UFC on FX: Belfort vs. Bisping	January 19, 2013	2	1:01	São Paulo, Brazil	
Win	32–8	Brendan Schaub	KO (punches)	UFC 145	April 21, 2012	1	1:10	Atlanta, Georgia, United States	Knockout of the Night.
Loss	31–8	Mark Hunt	Decision (unanimous)	UFC 135	September 24, 2011	3	5:00	Denver, Colorado, United States	
Win	31–7	Gilbert Yvel	Decision (unanimous)	UFC 115	June 12, 2010	3	5:00	Vancouver, British Columbia, Canada	
Loss	30–7	Cain Velasquez	TKO (punches)	UFC 104	October 24, 2009	2	0:58	Los Angeles, California, United States	
Win	30–6	Chris Guillen	TKO (submission to elbows)	Adrenaline MMA 2: Miletich vs. Denny	December 11, 2008	1	3:30	Moline, Illinois, United States	
Loss	29–6	Andrei Arlovski	KO (punches)	Affliction: Banned	July 19, 2008	3	1:13	Anaheim, California, United States	
Win	29–5	Ricco Rodriguez	Decision (unanimous)	IFL: 2007 Team Championship final	September 20, 2007	3	4:00	Hollywood, Florida, United States	
Win	28–5	Krzysztof Soszyński	TKO (punches)	IFL: 2007 semifinals	August 2, 2007	1	0:13	East Rutherford, New Jersey, United States	
Win	27–5	Travis Fulton	Submission (kimura)	IFL: Chicago	May 19, 2007	2	3:11	Chicago, Illinois, United States	
Win	26–5	Roy Nelson	Decision (split)	IFL: Moline	April 7, 2007	3	4:00	Moline, Illinois, United States	
Win	25–5	Matt Thompson	TKO (punches)	IFL: Houston	February 2, 2007	2	1:47	Houston, Texas, United States	
Win	24–5	Devin Cole	KO (head kick)	IFL: Championship final	December 29, 2006	1	3:16	Uncasville, Connecticut, United States	
Win	23–5	Wojtek Kaszowski	Submission (americana)	IFL: World Championship semifinals	November 2, 2006	1	3:14	Portland, Oregon, United States	
Win	22–5	Bryan Vetell	KO (punch)	IFL: Gracie vs. Miletich	September 23, 2006	1	3:17	Moline, Illinois, United States	
Win	21–5	Krzysztof Soszyński	TKO (punches)	IFL: Legends Championship 2006	April 29, 2006	1	3:59	Atlantic City, New Jersey, United States	
Win	20–5	Dan Bobish	KO (knee)	GFC: Team Gracie vs Team Hammer House	March 3, 2006	1	4:20	Columbus, Ohio, United States	
Win	19–5	Joey Smith	TKO (submission to punches)	ISCF: Gladiators X	February 24, 2006	1	N/A	Milwaukee, Wisconsin, United States	
Win	18–5	Don Richard	TKO (punches)	KOTC: Conquest	December 3, 2005	1	3:32	Calgary, Alberta, Canada	
Win	17–5	Allan Weickert	TKO (punches)	GFS: Fight Nite in the Flats	September 17, 2005	1	3:45	Cleveland, Ohio, United States	
Loss	16–5	Dan Christison	Submission (kimura)	Euphoria: USA vs World	February 26, 2005	3	0:57	Atlantic City, New Jersey, United States	
Win	16–4	Jonathan Wiezorek	TKO (punches)	Euphoria: Road to the Titles	October 15, 2004	1	1:09	Atlantic City, New Jersey, United States	
Win	15–4	Matt Bear	TKO (submission to punches)	Ultimate Throwdown	July 16, 2004	1	2:57	Des Moines, Iowa, United States	
Loss	14–4	Carlos Barreto	KO (head kick)	Heat FC 1: Genesis	July 31, 2003	1	N/A	Natal, Brazil	
Win	14–3	Royce Louck	TKO (doctor stoppage)	Freestyle Combat Challenge 11	June 28, 2003	1	N/A	Racine, Wisconsin, United States	
Loss	13–3	Ibragim Magomedov	TKO (retirement)	M-1 MFC: Russia vs. the World 4	November 15, 2002	1	10:00	St. Petersburg, Russia	Scheduled for one 10-minute round.
Win	13–2	Travis Fulton	TKO (injury)	Freestyle Combat Challenge 8	October 4, 2002	1	5:00	Racine, Wisconsin, United States	
Win	12–2	Johnathan Ivey	TKO (doctor stoppage)	USMMA 2: Ring of Fury	September 21, 2002	1	1:14	Lowell, Massachusetts, United States	Won the USMMA Heavyweight Championship.
Loss	11–2	Mike Whitehead	Decision (unanimous)	SB 24: Return of the Heavyweights 2	April 27, 2002	2	5:00	Honolulu, Hawaii, United States	
Win	11–1	Kerry Schall	TKO (neck injury)	SB 24: Return of the Heavyweights 2	April 27, 2002	2	2:10	Honolulu, Hawaii, United States	Schall fell out of the ring.
Win	10–1	Curtis Crawford	Submission (forearm choke)	SB 24: Return of the Heavyweights 1	April 26, 2002	1	1:03	Honolulu, Hawaii, United States	
Win	9–1	Mike Priest	TKO (injury)	Freestyle Combat Challenge 7	March 23, 2002	1	N/A	Racine, Wisconsin, United States	
Win	8–1	Mike Radnov	TKO (doctor stoppage)	Extreme Challenge 46	February 16, 2002	1	5:54	Clive, Iowa, United States	
Win	7–1	Kerry Schall	TKO (foot injury)	Extreme Challenge 46	February 16, 2002	1	7:29	Clive, Iowa, United States	
Win	6–1	Mike Marshalleck	TKO (punches)	Freestyle Combat Challenge 6	January 5, 2002	1	0:38	Racine, Wisconsin, United States	
Win	5–1	Steve Hutson	Submission (arm-triangle choke)	SC 8: Fight Night	November 10, 2001	1	3:35	LaSalle, Illinois, United States	
Loss	4–1	Tim Sylvia	Decision (unanimous)	Extreme Challenge 42	August 24, 2001	3	5:00	Davenport, Iowa, United States	
Win	4–0	Billy Herrington	TKO (submission to knees)	Iowa Challenge 2	August 11, 2001	1	1:07	Cedar Rapids, Iowa, United States	
Win	3–0	Darren Block	KO (punch)	Dangerzone: Auburn	April 28, 2001	1	0:16	Auburn, Indiana, United States	
Win	2–0	Anthony Ferguson	TKO (referee stoppage)	Dangerzone: Auburn	April 28, 2001	1	1:00	Auburn, Indiana, United States	
Win	1–0	Rob Shinkle	TKO (corner stoppage)	Freestyle Combat Challenge 3	January 6, 2001	1	0:21	Racine, Wisconsin, United States	

== Kickboxing record (incomplete) ==
Kickboxing record
3 wins, 0 losses
Date	Result	Opponent	Event	Location	Method	Round	Time
2005-10-21	Win	(United States) Justice Smith	ISCF: Colosseum Returns	Milwaukee, Wisconsin, USA	DQ (low blows)	1	N/A
2005-01-23	Win	(Japan) Nobu Hayashi	Shootboxing 2005: Ground Zero Fukuoka	Fukuoka, Japan	Decision (unanimous)	3	3:00
Legend: Win Loss Draw/No contest Notes

== Bare knuckle boxing record ==
Professional record breakdown
5 matches	4 wins	1 loss
By knockout	4	1

Res.	Record	Opponent	Method	Event	Date	Round	Time	Location	Notes
Loss	4–1	Andrei Arlovski	TKO (doctor stoppage)	BKFC Knucklemania VI	7 February 2026	3	1:14	Philadelphia, Pennsylvania, United States	Lost the BKFC Heavyweight Championship.
Win	4–0	Mick Terrill	KO (punch)	BKFC Knucklemania V	January 25, 2025	1	0:36	Philadelphia, Pennsylvania, United States	Won the BKFC Heavyweight Championship. Knockout of the Night.
Win	3–0	Todd Duffee	TKO (injury)	BKFC Knucklemania IV	April 27, 2024	1	0:43	Los Angeles, California, United States	
Win	2–0	Josh Copeland	TKO (corner stoppage)	BKFC 41	April 29, 2023	3	2:00	Broomfield, Colorado, United States	
Win	1–0	Bobo O'Bannon	KO (punch)	BKFC 30	October 1, 2022	1	0:19	Monroe, Louisiana, United States	Knockout of the Night.
