= Todd Duffee =

American mixed martial artist

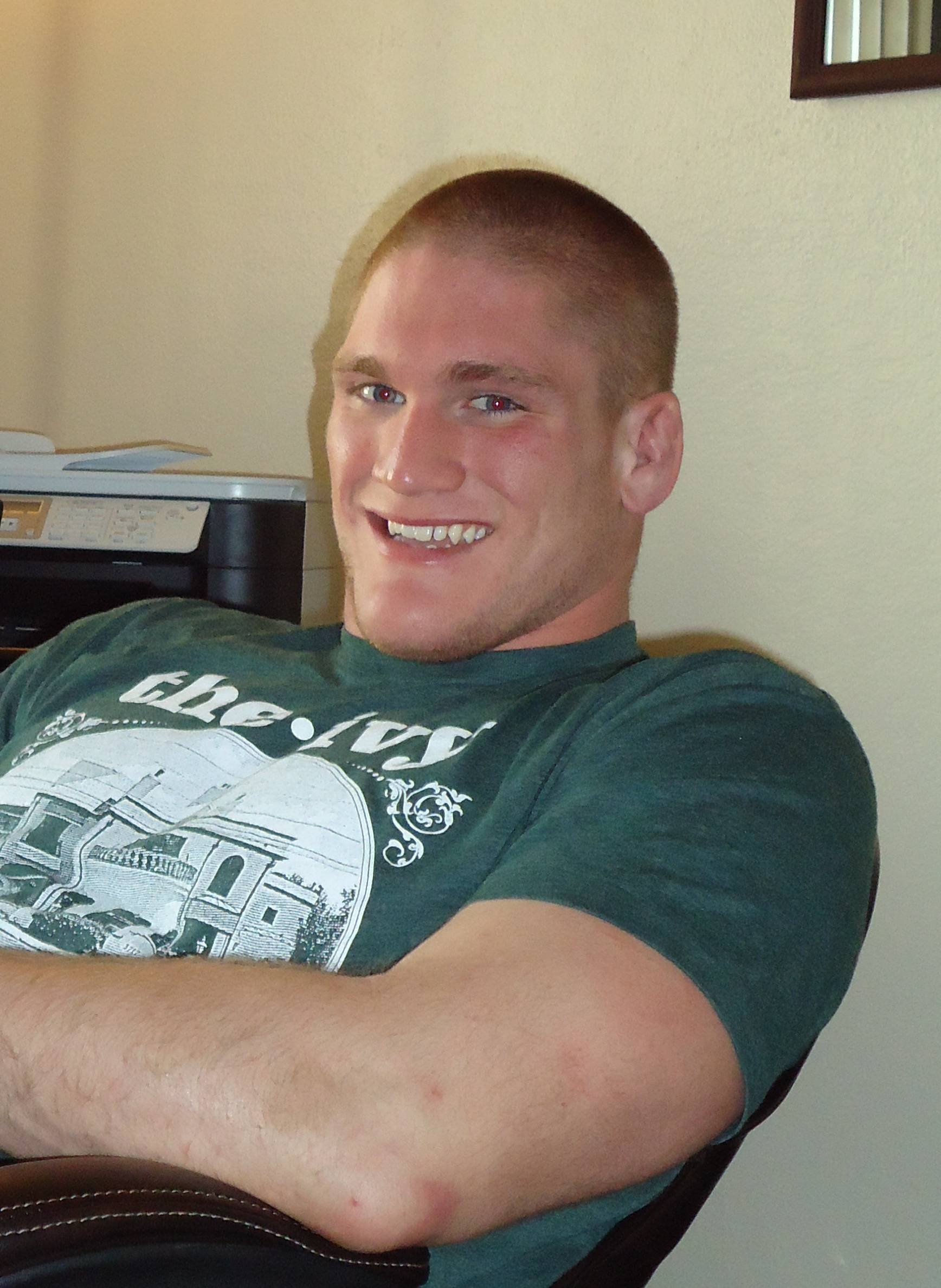
- Born: December 6, 1985 (age 40); Evansville, Indiana, U.S.
- Height: 6 ft 3 in (191 cm)
- Weight: 240 lb (109 kg; 17 st 2 lb)
- Division: Heavyweight
- Reach: 79 in (201 cm)
- Fighting out of: Dublin, California, United States
- Team: American Top Team (until 2009); Grudge Training Center (formerly); Combat Sports Academy; Xtreme Couture (2009–present); American Kickboxing Academy (2011–present)
- Trainer: Kirian Fitzgibbons
- Years active: 2006–present

Mixed martial arts record
- Total: 14
- Wins: 9
- By knockout: 9
- Losses: 4
- By knockout: 4
- No contests: 1

Other information
- University: University of Georgia
- Mixed martial arts record from Sherdog

Todd Duffee (born December 6, 1985) is an American mixed martial artist who competes in the Heavyweight division of Konfrontacja Sztuk Walki (KSW). He trains predominantly with the Combat Sports Academy and the American Kickboxing Academy in California. Duffee has also competed in the Ultimate Fighting Championship, Super Fight League in India, Jungle Fight in Brazil, and Dynamite!! 2010 in Japan. In addition to his mixed martial arts career he had a role in the 2011 film Never Back Down 2: The Beatdown as well as minor roles in both film and television. Duffee has also appeared on the front cover of Muscle & Fitness magazine.

== Background ==
Duffee was born in Evansville, Indiana, but grew up in Raleigh, Illinois, and Eldorado as the third son of a coal miner father and nurse mother. Duffee played many sports growing up, including baseball, football, track, bull riding, soccer, and basketball. Duffee also began training in boxing but was playing other highschool sports. A standout football player, he was signed on to play college football but his career was derailed from an injury. Duffee then moved to Atlanta, Georgia, when he was 18 years old and continued boxing, before watching a UFC event and shifting his training to mixed martial arts. He was working on a degree from the University of Georgia before transferring to University of Nevada, Las Vegas, then dropping out to train mixed martial arts full-time. As of February 2016, he is pursuing a degree in business from the University of Georgia.

== Mixed martial arts ==
=== Early career ===
Duffee won his first three fights against Mike Walbright, Mark Haniger and Josh Bennett. Duffee then agreed to fight UFC and PRIDE FC veteran, Assuério Silva in the main event of Jungle Fights 11. Duffee dominated the fight and won by knockout in the second round.

=== Ultimate Fighting Championship ===
Duffee was set to make his UFC debut against Mostapha al-Turk at UFC 99 until the UFC pulled Duffee from the fight. Duffee was replaced by Mirko Filipović.

He was next announced by the UFC to face fellow UFC newcomer Mike Russow. However, Duffee was then pulled from that match and instead was matched up against Tim Hague at UFC 102. Duffee set the record for the fastest KO in UFC heavyweight history (0:07) after flooring Hague with a stiff jab and rendering him unconscious with follow-up ground and pound. After the finish, he celebrated to the camera by saying "That was an appetizer, I want to eat now Dana, let me eat!"

Duffee was expected to face Paul Buentello at UFC 107 but pulled out due to a back injury.

Duffee fought Mike Russow at UFC 114 in which he lost via KO in the third round. Prior to the fight Duffee went on record to say that he was being overhyped by the MMA world, while his opponent was very much underrated. After dominating the first two rounds by utilizing his boxing, Duffee looked to be on his way to a unanimous decision win, when, from out of nowhere, Russow caught Duffee with two straight right hands followed by a hammerfist that prompted the referee to stop the fight as Duffee laid unconscious on the canvas. Joe Rogan stated that the nature of the knockout was "like something out of a movie" and was "one of the greatest comebacks in UFC history". Russow broke his left ulna while deflecting Duffee's punches at the end of round 1. After the fight it was revealed that Duffee fought with a torn MCL as well as Shingles of the eye.

Duffee was expected to face Jon Madsen on October 23, 2010, at UFC 121, but Duffee was once again forced off the card due to injury and replaced by Gilbert Yvel.

On September 7, 2010, Duffee was surprisingly released from the UFC for unknown reasons. It is rumored that Duffee requested financial aid in order to pay for a knee surgery which he couldn't afford, but when UFC said that he must pay for it himself there was a dispute between the two parties. Duffee spoke publicly about MMA fighters being underpaid and how he needed to take a second job just to pay for his training. Dana White later said in an interview with Ariel Helwani that Duffee had an attitude problem and that it seemed to him that "he doesn't want to be in the UFC, he doesn't like being in the UFC." He also said that he could work his way back into the organization via fighting in smaller leagues. Following his release Duffee said that he couldn't understand his release and has never been told why, although he harbors no bitterness toward the UFC president or the company.

=== DREAM ===
After his release from the UFC, Duffee Went to DREAM, a promotion based out of Japan. Being unable to secure an opponent for former Strikeforce Heavyweight Champion Alistair Overeem in DREAM's first Heavyweight Championship bout at Dynamite!!, Duffee had the manager throw his name in the mix of potentials for the bout. Less than one week before the event, he was officially named to take on Overeem in the title fight, leaving him very little time to prepare, but an opportunity to fight a big name in the sport. As the bout started Duffee charged in very aggressively flurrying punches to no avail, but the veteran Overeem stayed calm and landed a knee that rocked Duffee, followed by punches that put him out cold at 19 seconds of the first round. Duffee said after the fight that he respected Overeem's ability but felt that if he had sufficient time to train and prepare that it would have been a completely different outcome. Overeem brought Duffee in for his training camp in preparation for his UFC debut vs. Brock Lesnar in late 2011 in order for Duffee to help him with his takedown defense.

Duffee was scheduled to face Nick Gaston on July 16, 2011, at DREAM 17, but an injury sustained fighting Tyler East two weeks prior to fighting Duffee forced Nick Gaston to withdraw from the event. Dream was unable to find a replacement.

=== Super Fight League ===
In February 2012 Duffee signed an exclusive four-fight deal with Super Fight League, India's first professional Mixed Martial Arts fighting league launched and owned by Raj Kundra & Sanjay Dutt. He faced fellow UFC veteran Neil Grove on the SFL's second show held on April 7, 2012. He won via TKO after just 34 seconds in the first round, following up a right-hook that dropped Grove with heavy ground-and-pound. After the fight he thanked his training partners at the American Kickboxing Academy and credited them with helping him through a rough training camp, and stated that he is looking to fight again as soon as possible, adding that he "missed this". Shortly after his win, with SFL taking a 4-month break until their next event it was revealed that Duffee would be allowed to fight outside of the organization that summer if he could find fights. Duffee was appealing to promoters on Twitter for fights in both MMA and Professional Boxing but none came to fruition by the time of SFL's next event.

Duffee was originally announced to fight at SFL 4 on September 29 against former UFC title contender Jeff Monson but after the event was pushed back twice the SFL decided to change the structure of their shows, with weekly events replacing monthly events. Duffee and SFL agreed on his departure in September and he returned to free agency. Though frustrated by his fight with Monson falling out, the departure was amicable.

=== Return to UFC ===
Duffee made his UFC return against Phil De Fries on December 29, 2012, at UFC 155, as a replacement for Matt Mitrione. Despite fighting with a respiratory infection he won the fight via first-round TKO, weathering an early ground exchange before finishing De Fries on the feet. The performance earned Duffee Knockout of the Night honors.

==== Injury, Parsonage–Turner syndrome diagnosis and return ====
After the De Fries fight it emerged that Duffee had fought with an undisclosed injury sustained during his training camp and would be ruled out for much of 2013. He returned to training after successfully rehabbing the injury in September. However, 3 weeks into his return to the gym, after waking up with severe pains and numbness in his arm Duffee was diagnosed with an unknown affliction which was later revealed to be Parsonage–Turner syndrome. Despite initially being told by doctors that he would not be able to return for at least two years, Duffee returned to training after six months and in September 2014 announced that he was ready to fight.

Duffee returned from his extended hiatus to face Anthony Hamilton on December 6, 2014, at UFC 181. He won the fight via knockout in the first round.

Duffee faced Frank Mir in the main event at UFC Fight Night 71 on July 15, 2015. After rocking Mir with a punch, Duffee lost the fight via knockout in round one.

Duffee was expected to face Mark Godbeer on March 4, 2017, at UFC 209. However, Duffee pulled out of the fight in mid-February for undisclosed reasons, later revealed to be a shoulder injury.

After suffering setbacks in his shoulder rehabilitation, but ultimately recovering from the injury and returning to training, Duffee then suffered a knee injury. In August 2018, during the surgery to repair his ACL, the doctors discovered that he needed a surgery in his other knee as well. Subsequently, in December 2018, he underwent another surgery for the other knee and during the recovery, was infected with MRSA. After battling the infection, Duffee relocated to Las Vegas in order to rehabilitate and continue training at the UFC Performance Institute.

=== Return to competition after shoulder rehabilitation ===
After a four-year hiatus, Duffee returned to face Jeff Hughes on September 14, 2019, at UFC Fight Night 158. The bout ended in the first round as a No Contest due to an accidental eye poke that rendered Duffee unable to continue.

In May 2021, Duffee returned to training after successfully rehabbing further shoulder and knee surgeries, as well as a positive COVID-19 diagnosis.

=== Konfrontacja Sztuk Walki ===
After a three-year layoff, Duffee signed with Konfrontacja Sztuk Walki and rematched Phil De Fries for the KSW Heavyweight Championship on February 25, 2023, at KSW 79. Duffee lost the bout in the first round via ground and pound TKO.

=== Rizin Fighting Federation ===
Duffee was to face former sumo wrestler Tsuyoshi Sudario at Rizin 44 on September 23, 2023. However, Duffee withdrew from the fight due to a problem with his passport.

=== Global Fight League ===
Duffee was scheduled to face Robelis Despaigne in the inaugural Global Fight League event on May 24, 2025, at GFL 1. However, all GFL events were cancelled indefinitely.

== Bare-knuckle boxing ==
=== Bare Knuckle Fighting Championship ===
Duffee was scheduled to make his bare-knuckle boxing debut for Bare Knuckle Fighting Championship against Ben Rothwell at BKFC 56 on December 2, 2023. However, on November 30, it was announced the bout was cancelled due to Rothwell having an illness. The fight against Rothwell has been rescheduled for BKFC Knucklemania IV in Los Angeles on April 27, 2024. Duffee lost the fight by technical knockout after being knocked down and being injured in the first round.

== Acting ==
In 2011 Duffee made his film debut in the Michael Jai White-produced Never Back Down 2: The Beatdown, portraying Tim Newhouse, a talented MMA fighter who lives in relative poverty and has to deal with losing his father. He also had a cameo in Batman v Superman: Dawn of Justice in a fight scene.

== Championships and accomplishments ==
=== Mixed martial arts ===
- Ultimate Fighting Championship
  - Tied third fastest knockout in UFC history (seven seconds)
  - Fastest knockout in UFC Heavyweight division history (seven seconds)
  - Knockout of the Night (One time) vs. Philip De Fries
  - UFC.com Awards
    - 2009: Ranked #10 Newcomer of the Year (Tied with Kimbo Slice & Yoshihiro Akiyama) & Ranked #10 Knockout of the Year vs. Tim Hague

== Mixed martial arts record ==
Professional record breakdown
14 matches	9 wins	4 losses
By knockout	9	4
No contests	1	

Res.	Record	Opponent	Method	Event	Date	Round	Time	Location	Notes
Loss	9–4 (1)	Phil De Fries	TKO (punches)	KSW 79	February 25, 2023	1	3:46	Liberec, Czech Republic	For the KSW Heavyweight Championship.
NC	9–3 (1)	Jeff Hughes	NC (accidental eye poke)	UFC Fight Night: Cowboy vs. Gaethje	September 14, 2019	1	4:03	Vancouver, British Columbia, Canada	Accidental eye poke rendered Duffee unable to continue.
Loss	9–3	Frank Mir	KO (punch)	UFC Fight Night: Mir vs. Duffee	July 15, 2015	1	1:13	San Diego, California, United States	
Win	9–2	Anthony Hamilton	KO (punch)	UFC 181	December 6, 2014	1	0:33	Las Vegas, Nevada, United States	
Win	8–2	Phil De Fries	TKO (punches)	UFC 155	December 29, 2012	1	2:04	Las Vegas, Nevada, United States	Knockout of the Night.
Win	7–2	Neil Grove	TKO (punches)	SFL 2	April 7, 2012	1	0:34	Chandigarh, India	
Loss	6–2	Alistair Overeem	KO (punches)	Dynamite!! 2010	December 31, 2010	1	0:19	Saitama, Japan	For the inaugural DREAM Heavyweight Championship.
Loss	6–1	Mike Russow	KO (punch)	UFC 114	May 29, 2010	3	2:32	Las Vegas, Nevada, United States	
Win	6–0	Tim Hague	KO (punches)	UFC 102	August 29, 2009	1	0:07	Portland, Oregon, United States	
Win	5–0	Assuério Silva	TKO (punches)	Jungle Fight 11	September 13, 2008	2	1:17	Rio de Janeiro, Brazil	
Win	4–0	Josh Bennett	KO (punches)	Alianza National Full Contact 2	August 8, 2008	1	1:25	Santo Domingo, Dominican Republic	
Win	3–0	Mark Honneger	TKO (punches)	Crazy Horse Fights	December 11, 2007	1	3:22	Miami, Florida, United States	
Win	2–0	Mike Walbright	TKO (punches)	Beatdown Fight Party: Head On Collision	June 1, 2007	1	0:16	Kennesaw, Georgia, United States	
Win	1–0	Jonathan Spears	TKO (punches)	Beatdown Fight Party: Invasion	February 9, 2007	1	0:15	Kennesaw, Georgia, United States	

== Bare knuckle boxing record ==
Professional record breakdown
1 match	0 wins	1 loss
By knockout	0	1

Res.	Record	Opponent	Method	Event	Date	Round	Time	Location	Notes
Loss	0–1	Ben Rothwell	TKO (injury)	BKFC Knucklemania IV	April 27, 2024	1	0:43	Los Angeles, California, United States	

== See also ==
- List of current KSW fighters
- List of male mixed martial artists
