= Sergei Kharitonov =

Russian mixed martial artist (born 1980)

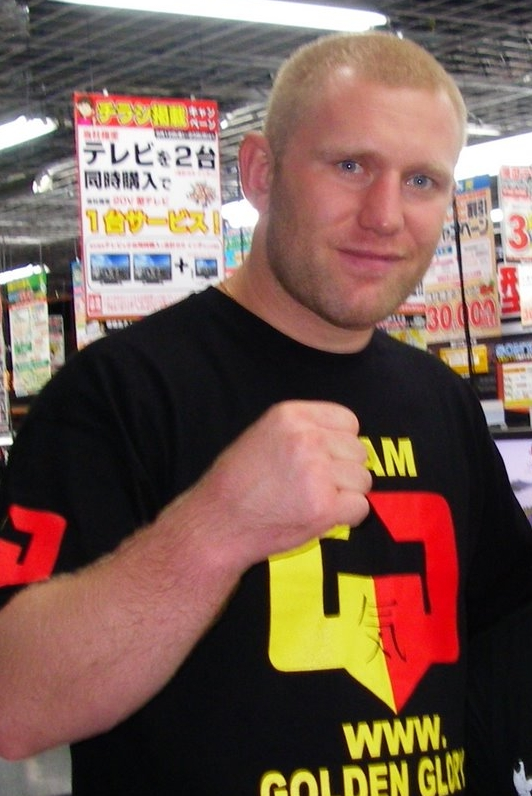
- Kharitonov in 2008
- Born: Sergei Valerievich Kharitonov; August 18, 1980 (age 46); Plesetsk, Russian SFSR, Soviet Union (now Russia)
- Native name: Сергей Харитонов
- Other names: Paratrooper
- Nationality: Russian
- Height: 6 ft 4 in (193 cm)
- Weight: 258 lb (117 kg; 18 st 6 lb)
- Division: Heavyweight
- Reach: 76 in (193 cm)
- Style: Kickboxing, Boxing
- Stance: Orthodox
- Fighting out of: Amsterdam, Netherlands
- Team: Russian Top Team (2002–2007); Baku Fires (Boxing Team); Golden Glory (2007–2013); Vityaz Fight (2013–present)
- Rank: International Master of Sport in Boxing
- Years active: 2000–present (MMA); 2009–2014, 2018 (Kickboxing)

Professional boxing record
- Total: 2
- Wins: 2
- By knockout: 2

Kickboxing record
- Total: 12
- Wins: 8
- By knockout: 6
- Losses: 4
- By knockout: 2

Mixed martial arts record
- Total: 47
- Wins: 36
- By knockout: 25
- By submission: 9
- By decision: 2
- Losses: 9
- By knockout: 4
- By submission: 4
- By decision: 1
- No contests: 2

Other information
- Boxing record from BoxRec
- Mixed martial arts record from Sherdog
- Last updated on: May 3, 2014

Sergei Kharitonov
Medal record

Men's Boxing

Central Asian Games

Representing Tajikistan
Silver medal – second place	2003 Dushanbe	+91 kg

Asian Amateur Championships

Representing Tajikistan
Silver medal – second place	2004 Puerto Princesa	+91 kg

Russian Championships
Silver medal – second place	2004 Samara	+91 kg

Sergei Valerievich Kharitonov (Russian: Серге́й Вале́рьевич Харито́нов, romanized: Sergéj Valér'jevich Kharitónov, IPA: [sʲɪrˈɡʲej xərʲɪˈtonəf]; born August 18, 1980) is a Russian professional boxer, mixed martial artist and former kickboxer. A professional MMA competitor since 2000, Kharitonov has previously fought in Japanese MMA organizations PRIDE Fighting Championships & DREAM (Both in Japan), Bellator MMA, M-1 Global, Strikeforce, and GLORY.

Kharitonov has competed in two major mixed martial arts tournaments and one major kickboxing tournament. He holds notable wins over former EliteXC Middleweight Champion Murilo Rua, former K-1 Champion Semmy Schilt, former Strikeforce Heavyweight Champion Alistair Overeem, and former UFC Heavyweight Champions Andrei Arlovski and Fabrício Werdum.

== Biography ==
Sergei Kharitonov was born on August 18, 1980, in Plesetsk, Russian SFSR, (now Russia). His parents were very athletic: Sergei's mother was a volleyball coach, and his father at various times studied boxing, skating, football, and long distance marathon running. Under their influence, Sergei was very active physically while growing up.

Kharitonov graduated from a high school with a specialization in music (accordion). Following the advice of his parents as well as his own dreams, Sergei went to the Ryazan Guards Higher Airborne Command School, and enlisted in the Russian Airborne Troops after finishing the academy. Kharitonov credits the army and the academy with giving him psychological skills he relies on during his fights.

Until resigning from the military in the late 2010s, Sergei remained on the active duty while training full-time. His military rank is captain.

Kharitonov sometimes gets confused with his full namesake Sergey Haritonov, a much less prominent mixed martial arts fighter from Estonia.

== Mixed martial arts career ==
=== Martial arts background ===
Sergei started being interested in sports when he was still in kindergarten, being taught at first by his father. Kharitonov started training boxing seriously when he was ten or eleven years old, following an incident when a drunken adult passer-by broke up a scuffle between Sergei and another boy by lifting Sergei in the air, hitting him in the face and cutting his eyebrow with that punch. The man justified his behavior by saying that Sergei should not have been hitting a grounded opponent.

At the age of sixteen, Kharitonov started studying Combat Sambo. During his studies in the Airborne Troops Academy, Sergei started competing in hand-to-hand combat (simplified form of Combat Sambo) and MMA. After Kharitonov graduated from the Academy, he was contacted by Vladimir Pogodin, the manager of the Russian Top Team, who invited him to join the club. At first, Sergei was invited to be Fedor Emelianenko's sparring partner, who taught him many ground fighting techniques, including striking on the ground and submissions. Sergei kept competing at various Russian MMA competitions, and in October 2003 he debuted in Pride Fighting Championships, one of the top two leading MMA organizations in the world at that time.

Sergei trains with the Russian national boxing and Sambo teams, as well as some freestyle wrestlers. He also recently added Muay Thai training to his regimen, and, according to him, he even borrows some elements from karate.

Sergei Kharitonov trained in Kirieevsk, Russia, under coach Mikhail Illoukhine (Russian: Михаил Илюхин). Ilyukhin chose Kirieevsk as their training base due to a large number of heavyweight MMA fighters available there. According to him, key elements of Sergei's success are his willpower and unpredictability in the ring. As of September 2007 he recently began training with the Golden Glory fight team in the Netherlands.

In addition to competing in MMA and boxing, Sergei competes in Combat Sambo for the Ryazan Desantnik (Paratrooper) club.

=== PRIDE ===
Sergei had a successful career as a heavyweight fighter in the Pride Fighting Championships, with an overall Pride record of 8–3–0. As of late 2005, Kharitonov has struggled with ongoing injuries to his upper back and shoulders, evident in his victory against Fabrício Werdum, in which his right shoulder was strained and injured nearly a minute into the bout, and in his loss to Alistair Overeem, where an awkward fall dislocated his shoulder.

Kharitonov lost to Alexander Emelianenko at Pride's Final Conflict Absolute 2006 on September 9, 2006.

Kharitonov scored a win against Mike Russow at PRIDE 33 in Las Vegas on February 24.

=== K-1 Hero's ===
On September 17, 2007, Kharitonov TKO's Alistair Overeem in the first round in the Hero's 10: Middleweight Tournament Final event, avenging a previous loss.

=== DREAM ===
Kharitonov's next fight was scheduled to be against Mighty Mo at DREAM 6 on September 23, 2008. However Mighty Mo was forced to withdraw due to a back injury. Jimmy Ambriz was Mighty Mo's replacement. Sergei scored a win in the first round by submission via strikes. At Dream 8 Jeff Monson secured Sergei in a North/South Choke. The Russian tried punching his way out but was soon forced to tap for the first time in his career.

=== Strikeforce ===
Sergei signed a deal to fight for Strikeforce and made his debut on February 12, 2011. He faced former UFC Heavyweight champion Andrei Arlovski in the opening round of Strikeforce 2011 Heavyweight Grand-Prix. Sergei defeated Andrei Arlovski by knockout in the first round. Sergei faced Josh Barnett, who defeated Brett Rogers on June 18, 2011, at Strikeforce: Dallas, in the next round. He lost via submission in the first round.

=== Post-Strikeforce ===
On June 1, 2012, he submitted John Delgado by keylock at the MMA: Russian Open Championship in St.Petersburg, Russia. Kharitonov has signed with M-1 Global and Oleg Taktarov's Fight Star MMA Promotion and was expected to fight Travis Wiuff in December 2013. This fight did not materialize, but on November 15 of that year Kharitonov faced Alexey Kudin at M-1 Challenge in Surgut, Russia and defeated him by TKO (punches) in the second round.

In his next appearance, Sergei defeated Tyler East via second-round TKO at Tech-Krep Fighting Championship - Prime on March 21, 2014.

Kharitonov was expected to face Satoshi Ishii on November 11, 2014, at M-1 Challenge 53: Battle in the Celestial Empire. However, Ishii withdrew from the bout due to injury. He instead faced Kenny Garner at the event, which took place on November 25, with Kharitonov winning via doctor stoppage in the third round.

=== M-1 Global ===
Kharitonov faced Alexei Kudin on November 15, 2013, at M-1 Challenge 43. He won the fight via TKO in the second round.

Kharitonov beat Kenny Garner at M-1 Challenge 53 on November 25, 2014, via TKO (doctor stoppage) in 3 round.

In the rematch he wins over Kenny Garner again on July 3, 2015, at M-1 Challenge 59 via TKO in the first round.

=== Bellator MMA ===
On February 3, 2016, it was announced that Kharitonov had signed with Bellator. Kharitonov made his debut against Javy Ayala on November 4, 2016, at Bellator 163. He lost the fight via knockout in the first round.

Kharitonov faced Chase Gormley at Bellator 175 on March 31, 2017. He won the fight via knockout in the first round.

Kharitonov faced Roy Nelson in the Bellator 207 co-main event on October 12, 2018. He won the fight via knockout in round one.

After the Nelson fight, Kharitonov signed a new multi-fight contract with Bellator and headlined Bellator 215 against Matt Mitrione on February 15, 2019. Unfortunately, the bout ended in a No Contest just 15 seconds into the first round after Mitrione landed an accidental groin strike and Kharitonov was unable to continue.

Kharitonov faced Mitrione in an immediate rematch six months later at Bellator 225 on August 24, 2019. He won the fight via TKO in the second round.

Kharitonov headlined Bellator 234 against Linton Vassell on November 14, 2019. He lost the fight via TKO in the second round.

Kharitonov faced Fernando Rodrigues Jr. at World Total Kombat Federation 5 on February 23, 2020. He claimed the WTKF Heavyweight Championship via second-round knockout.

Next, Kharitonov was supposed to rematch Linton Vassell in May 2020, but the bout was scrapped due to the COVID-19 pandemic.

Kharitonov faced Oli Thompson at MFP Parus Fight Championship on November 7, 2020. He won the fight via first-round knockout.

Kharitonov faced Cheick Kongo on August 20, 2021, at Bellator 265. He lost the fight via a rear-naked choke in round two.

=== Parus FC ===
Kharitonov defended his Parus FC Heavyweight Championship against Fábio Maldonado at an Parus FC event on November 6, 2021. He won the bout via TKO in the first round.

=== Eagle FC ===
Kharitonov, as a replacement for Antônio Silva, faced Tyrone Spong on January 28, 2022, at EFC 44. He won the fight by technical knockout in the second round.

=== MMA Series ===
Kharitonov returned after a year and half break from MMA to face Tiago Cardoso on September 23, 2023 at MMA Series 72, winning the bout via TKO stoppage in the first round.

== Kickboxing ==
=== K-1 ===
Since signing with team Golden Glory Breda in July 2007, Sergei has been in the Netherlands training with some of the best standup fighters in the world. After his loss to Jeff Monson in April, the decision was made to make the last fight on his Dream contract a K-1 match at the K-1 World Grand Prix 2009 Final on December 5. On November 28, K-1 announced that his opponent would be Daniel Ghita in the second reserve match of the Grand Prix. Ghita was originally scheduled to face Kharitonov's teammate Chalid Arrab, who had to withdraw due to an injury. Ghita defeated Kharitonov by TKO (right low kick) in the third round.

Kharitonov fought Takumi Sato at the 2010 K-1 World Grand Prix in Seoul. Kharitonov won by KO in the first round. On December 11 at the 2010 K-1 World Grand Prix Final Sergei was defeated by Singh Jaideep by TKO (punches) in the first round. Kharitonov faced Samoan kickboxer Mighty Mo at the United Glory World Series Finals in Moscow on May 28, 2011. He won via KO in the first round. On March 23, 2012, Kharitonov met Mark Miller at United Glory 15 in Moscow, and won by KO (right hook) in the first round.

=== Glory ===
He lost to Rico Verhoeven at the opening round of the sixteen-man 2012 Glory Heavyweight Grand Slam held at Glory 4: Tokyo - 2012 Heavyweight Grand Slam in Saitama, Japan on December 31, 2012. Verhoeven was leading the judges' scorecards after the first two, two-minute rounds and so was given the victory.

He was set to fight Jérôme Le Banner at Glory 10: Los Angeles in Ontario, California, United States on September 28, 2013 but the Frenchman withdrew after suffering a neck injury.

Kharitonov defeated Daniel Sam via unanimous decision at Glory 11: Chicago - Heavyweight World Championship Tournament in Hoffman Estates, Illinois, on October 12, 2013.

The Jérôme Le Banner fight was rescheduled for Glory 13: Tokyo - Welterweight World Championship Tournament in Tokyo, Japan on December 21, 2013. Kharitonov won by unanimous decision.

He lost to Anderson "Braddock" Silva via UD the semi-finals of the Glory 16: Denver - Heavyweight Contendership Tournament in Broomfield, Colorado, US on May 3, 2014.

Replacing Pat Barry who withdrew from the fight for undisclosed reasons, Kharitonov was scheduled to face Mirko "Cro Cop" Filipović at Glory 17: Los Angeles in Inglewood, California, on June 21, 2014. Kharitonov then also withdrew, citing a finger injury, and was replaced by Jarrell Miller. On October 11, 2014, at the W5 Grand Prix in Moscow, Kharitonov again faced Silva, winning the rematch by second-round TKO.

== Boxing ==
Kharitonov started his Amateur Boxing Career in 2000. He tried to get into the Russian Olympic Boxing team but got injured in the semi-finals during a live boxing TV event. Instead he competed for Tajikistan in 2003 at the Central Asian Games where he won a silver medal. Kharitonov earned a shot at that year’s Olympics, representing former Tajikistan (the former Soviet republics often have ethnic Russians on their teams) but passed on the chance to instead fight in the Pride 2004 Heavyweight Grand Prix.

Kharitonov nearly qualified for the Athens Games by winning the silver medal at the 2004 Asian Amateur Boxing Championships in Puerto Princesa, Philippines. In the final he was defeated by Uzbekistan's Rustam Saidov. In the fall of 2004 he competed in the Russian Boxing Championship and placed second. Sergei could not fight in the final match due to an injury.

Kharitonov defeated Danny Williams on September 11, 2020, in his professional boxing debut.

== Personal life ==
Kharitonov and his wife Natalya have one child.

== Championships and accomplishments ==
=== Boxing ===
- 2003 Central Asian Games silver medalist
- 2004 Asian Championships silver medalist
- 2007 Russian Championship silver medalist.

=== Mixed martial arts ===
- MMA Series
  - MMSR Heavyweight Championship (One time)
- Modern Fighting Pankration
  - MFP Heavyweight Championship (One time)
- MFP Parus Fight Championship
  - Parus FC Heavyweight Championship (One time)
    - One successful title defense
- World Total Kombat Federation
  - WTKF Heavyweight Championship (One time)
- PRIDE Fighting Championship
  - PRIDE 2004 Heavyweight Grand Prix semi-finalist
- Strikeforce
  - Strikeforce 2011 Heavyweight Grand Prix semi-finalist
- Other
  - Tournament of Real Men 8 champion.
  - Brilliant 2 – Yalta's Brilliant 2000 champion.

=== Kickboxing ===
- W5
  - W5 World Heavyweight Championship

=== Other ===
- Six times champion Russian Airborne Troops Hand-to-hand combat fight.
- Russian Airborne Troops Sambo champion.
- Eurasia Combat Sambo champion.
- Three times champion Russian Army combat fight.
- Three times champion Russian combat Hand-to-hand fight.
- World Universal Fight Unifight champion.
- Two times Russian Free Fight champion

== Mixed martial arts record ==
Professional record breakdown
47 matches	36 wins	9 losses
By knockout	25	4
By submission	9	4
By decision	2	1
No contests	2	

Res.	Record	Opponent	Method	Event	Date	Round	Time	Location	Notes
Win	36–9 (2)	Marcus Vinicius	TKO (knee)	Grand Bellagio 1	May 25, 2024	1	3:20	Batumi, Georgia	
Win	35–9 (2)	Tiago Cardoso	TKO (punches)	MMA Series 72	September 23, 2023	1	3:07	Moscow, Russia	Won the MMASR Heavyweight Championship
Win	34–9 (2)	Roggers Souza	TKO (punches)	MFP 241	August 26, 2023	1	3:52	Vladivostok, Russia	Won the MFP Heavyweight Championship
Win	33–9 (2)	Tyrone Spong	TKO (punches)	Eagle FC 44	January 28, 2022	2	2:55	Miami, Florida, United States	
Win	32–9 (2)	Fabio Maldonado	TKO (punches)	MFP Parus Fight Championship	November 6, 2021	1	3:28	Dubai, United Arab Emirates	Defended the Parus FC Heavyweight Championship
Loss	31–9 (2)	Cheick Kongo	Submission (rear-naked choke)	Bellator 265	August 20, 2021	2	4:59	Sioux Falls, South Dakota, United States	
Win	31–8 (2)	Oli Thompson	KO (punch)	MFP Parus Fight Championship	November 7, 2020	1	2:50	Dubai, United Arab Emirates	Won the Parus FC Heavyweight Championship
Loss	30–8 (2)	Linton Vassell	TKO (punches)	Bellator 234	November 15, 2019	2	3:15	Tel Aviv, Israel	
Win	30–7 (2)	Matt Mitrione	TKO (knee and punches)	Bellator 225	August 24, 2019	2	1:24	Bridgeport, Connecticut, United States	
NC	29–7 (2)	Matt Mitrione	NC (accidental groin strike)	Bellator 215	February 15, 2019	1	0:15	Uncasville, Connecticut, United States	An accidental groin strike from Mitrione rendered Kharitonov unable to continue.
Win	29–7 (1)	Roy Nelson	KO (punches and knee)	Bellator 207	October 12, 2018	1	4:59	Uncasville, Connecticut, United States	
NC	28–7 (1)	Anton Vyazigin	NC (accidental eye poke)	M-1 Challenge 92: Kharitonov vs. Vyazigin	May 24, 2018	2	0:20	St. Petersburg, Russia	Catchweight (280 lbs) bout. Originally a majority decision for Kharitionov; later overturned due to an accidental eye poke.
Win	28–7	Joey Beltran	Decision (unanimous)	Russian Cagefighting Championship	February 25, 2018	3	5:00	Yekaterinburg, Russia	
Win	27–7	Geronimo dos Santos	Submission (ankle lock)	M-1 Challenge 81: Battle in the Mountains 6	July 22, 2017	1	2:13	Nazran, Russia	Catchweight (280 lbs) bout.
Win	26–7	Rameau Thierry Sokoudjou	KO (punch)	M-1 Challenge 80: Kharitonov vs. Sokoudjou	June 15, 2017	1	0:40	Harbin, China	
Win	25–7	Chase Gormley	KO (punch)	Bellator 175	March 31, 2017	1	3:55	Rosemont, Illinois, United States	
Loss	24–7	Javy Ayala	KO (punch)	Bellator 163	November 4, 2016	1	0:16	Uncasville, Connecticut, United States	
Win	24–6	Kenny Garner	TKO (punches)	M-1 Challenge 59: Battle of Nomads 5	July 3, 2015	1	4:11	Astana, Kazakhstan	
Win	23–6	Kenny Garner	TKO (doctor stoppage)	M-1 Challenge 53: Battle in the Celestial Empire	November 25, 2014	3	2:01	Beijing, China	
Win	22–6	Tyler East	TKO (punches)	Tech-Krep Fighting Championship: Prime	March 21, 2014	2	2:54	Krasnodar, Russia	
Win	21–6	Alexei Kudin	TKO (punches)	M-1 Challenge 43	November 16, 2013	2	4:56	Surgut, Russia	
Win	20–6	John Delgado	Submission (americana)	MMA: Russian Open Championship	June 1, 2012	1	0:34	St.Petersburg, Russia	
Loss	19–6	Josh Barnett	Submission (arm-triangle choke)	Strikeforce: Barnett vs. Kharitonov	September 10, 2011	1	4:28	Cincinnati, Ohio, United States	Strikeforce Heavyweight Grand Prix Semifinal.
Win	19–5	Andrei Arlovski	KO (punches)	Strikeforce: Fedor vs. Silva	February 12, 2011	1	2:49	East Rutherford, New Jersey, United States	Strikeforce Heavyweight Grand Prix Quarterfinal.
Win	18–5	Tatsuya Mizuno	KO (knee)	Dynamite!! 2010	December 31, 2010	1	1:25	Saitama, Japan	
Loss	17–5	Jeff Monson	Submission (north-south choke)	DREAM 8	April 5, 2009	1	1:42	Nagoya, Japan	
Win	17–4	Jimmy Ambriz	TKO (submission to punches)	DREAM 6: Middleweight Grand Prix 2008 Final Round	September 23, 2008	1	2:15	Saitama, Japan	
Win	16–4	Alistair Overeem	KO (punch)	HERO'S 10: Middleweight Tournament Final	September 17, 2007	1	4:21	Yokohama, Japan	
Win	15–4	Mike Russow	Submission (armbar)	PRIDE 33	February 24, 2007	1	3:46	Las Vegas, Nevada, United States	
Loss	14–4	Alexander Emelianenko	TKO (punches and knees)	PRIDE FC: Final Conflict Absolute	September 10, 2006	1	6:45	Saitama, Japan	
Loss	14–3	Alistair Overeem	TKO (knees)	PRIDE 31: Dreamers	February 26, 2006	1	5:13	Saitama, Japan	
Win	14–2	Fabrício Werdum	Decision (split)	PRIDE 30: Fully Loaded	October 23, 2005	3	5:00	Saitama, Japan	
Win	13–2	Peter Mulder	Submission (armbar)	RINGS Russia: CIS vs. The World	August 20, 2005	1	6:16	Yekaterinburg, Russia	
Win	12–2	Pedro Rizzo	TKO (soccer kick and punches)	PRIDE FC: Critical Countdown 2005	June 26, 2005	1	2:02	Saitama, Japan	
Win	11–2	Choi Mu-Bae	KO (punches)	PRIDE 29: Fists of Fire	February 20, 2005	1	3:24	Saitama, Japan	
Loss	10–2	Antônio Rodrigo Nogueira	Decision (unanimous)	PRIDE Final Conflict 2004	August 15, 2004	2	5:00	Saitama, Japan	PRIDE 2004 Heavyweight Grand Prix Semifinal.
Win	10–1	Semmy Schilt	TKO (punches)	PRIDE Critical Countdown 2004	June 20, 2004	1	9:19	Saitama, Japan	PRIDE 2004 Heavyweight Grand Prix Quarterfinal.
Win	9–1	Murilo Rua	KO (punches)	PRIDE Total Elimination 2004	April 25, 2004	1	4:14	Saitama, Japan	PRIDE 2004 Heavyweight Grand Prix Opening Round.
Win	8–1	Cory Peterson	Submission (armbar)	PRIDE 27	February 1, 2004	1	1:23	Osaka, Japan	
Win	7–1	Jason Suttie	Submission (armbar)	PRIDE Bushido 1	October 5, 2003	1	2:25	Saitama, Japan	
Loss	6–1	Martin Malkhasyan	Submission (knee bar)	Legion Fight Black Sea Cup 2003 (Stage 2)	May 18, 2003	1	4:45	Rostov-on-Don, Russia	
Win	6–0	David Shvelidze	Submission (heel hook)	TORM 8: Tournament of Real Men 8	February 20, 2003	1	1:00	Yekaterinburg, Russia	Won TORM 8 Heavyweight Championship.
Win	5–0	Osman Vagabov	Submission (rear-naked choke)	TORM 8: Tournament of Real Men 8	February 20, 2003	1	0:47	Yekaterinburg, Russia	
Win	4–0	Sergey Kaznovsky	Submission	IAFC: Mega-Sphere Cup 2	August 18, 2001	1	N/A	Moscow, Russia	
Win	3–0	Roman Savochka	TKO (hand injury)	Brilliant 2: Yalta's Brilliant 2000	August 11, 2000	1	3:11	Yalta, Ukraine	Won the Brilliant 2 Heavyweight Tournament.
Win	2–0	Viacheslav Kolesnik	TKO (punch)	Brilliant 2: Yalta's Brilliant 2000	August 11, 2000	1	1:26	Yalta, Ukraine	Brilliant 2 Heavyweight Tournament Semifinal.
Win	1–0	Zamir Syrgabayev	TKO (submission to punches)	Brilliant 2: Yalta's Brilliant 2000	August 11, 2000	1	2:43	Yalta, Ukraine	Brilliant 2 Heavyweight Tournament Quarterfinal.

== Kickboxing record ==
Kickboxing record
8 Wins (6 (T)KO's), 4 Losses
Date	Result	Opponent	Event	Location	Method	Round	Time	Record
2020-02-23	Win	(Brazil) Fernando Rodrigues Jr	WTKF 5	Minsk, Belarus	KO	2	0:08	8-4
2018-05-30	Win	(Belgium) Frédéric Sinistra	Zhara Fight Show	Moscow, Russia	TKO (3 knockdowns)	2	N/A	7-4
2014-10-11	Win	(Brazil) Anderson Silva	W5 Grand Prix - Rematch	Moscow, Russia	TKO (Punches)	2	2:50	6-4
Wins the W5 World Heavyweight Title.
2014-05-03	Loss	(Brazil) Anderson Silva	Glory 16: Denver - Heavyweight Contender Tournament, Semi-finals	Broomfield, Colorado, USA	Decision (Unanimous)	3	3:00	5-4
2013-12-21	Win	(France) Jérôme Le Banner	Glory 13: Tokyo	Tokyo, Japan	Decision (Unanimous)	3	3:00	5-3
2013-10-12	Win	(England) Daniel Sam	Glory 11: Chicago	Hoffman Estates, Illinois, USA	Decision (Unanimous)	3	3:00	4-3
2012-12-31	Loss	(Netherlands) Rico Verhoeven	Glory 4: Tokyo - Heavyweight Grand Slam Tournament, First Round	Saitama, Japan	Decision (Unanimous)	2	2:00	3-3
2012-03-23	Win	(United States) Mark Miller	United Glory 15	Moscow, Russia	KO (Right hook)	1	1:59	3-2
2011-05-28	Win	(United States) Mighty Mo	United Glory 14: 2010-2011 World Series Finals	Moscow, Russia	KO (Right uppercut)	1	1:59	2-2
2010-12-11	Loss	(India) Singh Jaideep	K-1 World Grand Prix 2010 Final	Tokyo, Japan	KO (Right hook)	1	2:58	1-2
2010-10-02	Win	(Japan) Takumi Sato	K-1 World Grand Prix 2010 in Seoul Final 16	Seoul, South Korea	KO (Strikes)	1	2:50	1-1
2009-12-05	Loss	(Romania) Daniel Ghiţă	K-1 World Grand Prix 2009 Final	Yokohama, Japan	KO (Right low kick)	3	0:36	0-1
Legend: Win Loss Draw/No contest Notes

== Professional boxing record ==
2 fights	2 wins	0 losses
By knockout	2	0

No.	Result	Record	Opponent	Type	Round, time	Date	Location	Notes
1	Win	2–0	Osborn Machimana	TKO	3 (8), 2:56	12 Jun 2021	M1 Casino, Minsk, Belarus	
1	Win	1–0	Danny Williams	TKO	2 (6), 2:25	11 Sep 2020	Basketball Center, Khimki, Russia	

== Exhibition boxing record ==
1 fight	1 win	0 losses
By decision	1	0

No.	Result	Record	Opponent	Type	Round, time	Date	Location	Notes
1	Win	1–0	Malik Scott	SD	6	18 Mar 2022	M1 Casino, Minsk, Belarus	

== Bareknuckle boxing record ==
Professional record breakdown
1 match	1 win	0 losses
By knockout	1	0

Res.	Record	Opponent	Method	Event	Date	Round	Time	Location	Notes
Win	1–0	Mike Cook	TKO (punch)	BYB Extreme Fight Series	April 17, 2021	1	2:27	Miami, Florida, United States	

== See also ==
- List of current Bellator fighters
- List of Strikeforce alumni
- List of male mixed martial artists
