= Justin Wren =

American mixed martial arts fighter

- Born: Justin Christopher Wren; April 27, 1987 (age 39); Greenville, Mississippi, United States
- Other names: The Big Pygmy
- Height: 6 ft 2 in (1.88 m)
- Weight: 234.4 lb (106.3 kg; 16.74 st)
- Division: Heavyweight
- Reach: 75 in (191 cm)
- Fighting out of: Oklahoma City, Oklahoma, United States; Fort Worth, Texas, United States
- Team: Team Takedown; Grudge Training Center; Travis Lutter BJJ
- Rank: Blue belt in Brazilian Jiu-Jitsu
- Years active: 2006–2017

Mixed martial arts record
- Total: 15
- Wins: 13
- By knockout: 6
- By submission: 4
- By decision: 3
- Losses: 2
- By knockout: 1
- By decision: 1

Other information
- Mixed martial arts record from Sherdog

Justin Christopher Wren (born April 27, 1987) is an American humanitarian worker and former professional mixed martial artist, who competed in the heavyweight division of Bellator MMA. A professional competitor since 2006, Wren has also formerly competed for the UFC, and was a cast member of SpikeTV's The Ultimate Fighter: Heavyweights.

== Amateur wrestling career ==
Wren enjoyed a highly successful and decorated wrestling career before venturing into MMA. He was a standout at Texas wrestling powerhouse Bishop Lynch High School, where he was coached by Olympic Gold Medalists Kenny Monday and Kendall Cross. During that time, he was a two time Prep State Champion (2004, 2005) and a two time Prep all-American, winning the Prep National Championship his senior year in Lehigh, Pennsylvania.

While he was indeed a standout collegiate-style wrestler, Wren's greatest success came in the Greco Roman style. He was a two time All-American in that discipline, winning the national championship in Fargo, ND the summer after his senior year in high school ('05). This championship gained him national attention and earned him a scholarship to the U.S. Olympic Education Center at Northern Michigan University to train for the Olympics to compete in Greco Roman wrestling.

== Mixed martial arts ==
Wanting to try his hand at Division I college wrestling, Wren attended Iowa State University to compete for then coach Cael Sanderson, however, he sustained an injury training before he could join the team. To stay active, Wren entered local fights around Iowa and began his MMA career.

Wren won his first three fights by knockout before taking his first loss. His opponent was Matt Thompson. Wren then won five more fights and was ten and one before appearing on TUF. Heading into the tenth installment of The Ultimate Fighter, Wren had trained all over the world but found his permanent home in Denver, CO with TUF 10 coach Trevor Wittman.

=== The Ultimate Fighter ===
Wren was on the tenth season of The Ultimate Fighter fighting for Team Rashad. He was picked third for his team and fifth overall. On episode five, Wren fought UFC veteran Wes Sims, defeating him via first round technical submission from an arm triangle.

Wren then moved on to the quarter-finals and fought Roy Nelson in a controversial two round majority decision loss that many spectators at ring side, including Dana White, felt should have gone to a third round.

=== Ultimate Fighting Championship ===
Wren would go on make his UFC debut at The Ultimate Finale 10, against Ultimate Fighter 10 castmate, Jon Madsen, to whom he lost via split decision. Wren was later released from the UFC.

=== Post-UFC ===
On Jan. 23, 2010 Wren announced he had signed a deal with an unnamed promotion. Then on Jan. 26, the promotion was named as Ring of Fire MMA, based in Colorado. He fought and defeated Josh Henry in his debut for Ring of Fire by TKO in the first round.

After injuring his back from a slam in his victory over Josh Robertson, Wren underwent a corrective procedure to repair six or seven discs in his back.

=== Bellator MMA ===
In July 2015, Wren signed a five-fight contract with Bellator MMA. After five years away from the sport, Wren made his promotional debut against Josh Burns at Bellator 141 on August 28, 2015. He won the fight by unanimous decision. He won his second Bellator bout against Juan Torres on February 19, 2016, also by unanimous decision.

Wren faced Roman Pizzolato at Bellator 174 on March 3, 2017. He won via submission due to an arm-triangle choke in the first round.

== Mixed martial arts record ==
Professional record breakdown
15 matches	13 wins	2 losses
By knockout	6	1
By submission	4	0
By decision	3	1

Res.	Record	Opponent	Method	Event	Date	Round	Time	Location	Notes
Win	13–2	Roman Pizzolato	Submission (arm-triangle choke)	Bellator 174	March 3, 2017	1	2:35	Thackerville, Oklahoma, United States	
Win	12–2	Juan Torres	Decision (unanimous)	Bellator 149	February 19, 2016	3	5:00	Houston, Texas, United States	
Win	11–2	Josh Burns	Decision (unanimous)	Bellator 141	August 28, 2015	3	5:00	Temecula, California, United States	
Win	10–2	Josh Robertson	Submission (rear-naked choke)	Fight Force International: Blood & Sand 8	July 17, 2010	2	4:55	Biloxi, Mississippi, United States	
Win	9–2	Reggie Higgins	Decision (unanimous)	MMA Xplosion: Fight Night II at the Hard Rock	May 22, 2010	3	5:00	Las Vegas, Nevada, United States	
Win	8–2	Josh Henry	TKO (punches)	Ring of Fire 37: Warlords	March 5, 2010	1	1:20	Omaha, Nebraska, United States	
Loss	7–2	Jon Madsen	Decision (split)	The Ultimate Fighter: Heavyweights Finale	December 5, 2009	3	5:00	Las Vegas, Nevada, United States	
Win	7–1	Lamar Coleman	Submission (arm-triangle choke)	Brutaal: Hilton Coliseum	April 11, 2009	1	1:03	Ames, Iowa, United States	
Win	6–1	Chris Guillen	TKO (punches)	Xp3: The Proving Ground	July 26, 2008	2	1:45	Houston, Texas, United States	
Win	5–1	Ralph Kelly	TKO (corner stoppage)	C3 Fights: Contenders	January 19, 2008	2	3:00	Oklahoma City, Oklahoma, United States	
Win	4–1	Tony Guined	Submission (guillotine choke)	Ultra Pure Productions: Graveyard Smash	October 31, 2007	1	3:04	Conroe, Texas, United States	
Loss	3–1	Matt Thompson	TKO (referee stoppage)	Art of War 2	May 11, 2007	2	0:27	Austin, Texas, United States	
Win	3–0	Justin Howard	TKO (punches)	Art of War 1	March 9, 2007	2	1:32	Dallas, Texas, United States	
Win	2–0	Brian Ewers	TKO (punches)	ECF: Winter War	January 27, 2007	1	0:42	Spirit Lake, Iowa, United States	
Win	1–0	Ronald Stackhouse	TKO (punches)	Masters of the Cage 7	December 2, 2006	1	1:45	Norman, Oklahoma, United States	

== Humanitarian work ==
Wren has done a number of charity drives and expeditions for his charity Fight for the Forgotten, with his work being featured on The Joe Rogan Experience. He published an account of his life (co-authored by Loretta Hunt) and work with Mbuti pygmy tribes, also entitled 'Fight for the Forgotten', in September 2015.

He used a portion of his earnings from MMA to buy land and build fresh water wells for the Mbuti pygmy people in the Democratic Republic of Congo. His solution uses local workforce and can be walked into areas otherwise inaccessible to well drilling machinery; initially they find well locations using a vertical electrical sounding machine.

== Personal life ==
Wren is a Christian. He lives in Austin, TX.

== Podcast ==
Justin Wren, with his partner Amy Edwards, runs the Overcome with Justin Wren podcast. The podcast focuses on overcoming childhood trauma, sexual abuse, immense bullying, depression, suicidal ideation, self-imposed substance abuse, addiction and suicide prevention.

== See also ==
- List of current Bellator fighters
