= Jon Madsen =

American mixed martial artist (born 1980)

- Born: February 12, 1980 (age 46); Orange County, California, United States
- Height: 6 ft 0 in (1.83 m)
- Weight: 222 lb (101 kg; 15.9 st)
- Division: Heavyweight
- Reach: 72 in (183 cm)
- Fighting out of: Granite City, Illinois, United States
- Team: Team DeathClutch / Minnesota Martial Arts Academy
- Wrestling: NCAA Division II National Champion Wrestling
- Years active: 2008–2015

Mixed martial arts record
- Total: 10
- Wins: 8
- By knockout: 4
- By decision: 4
- Losses: 2
- By knockout: 1
- By decision: 1

Other information
- University: South Dakota State University
- Mixed martial arts record from Sherdog

Jonathan Madsen (born February 12, 1980) is an American retired mixed martial artist who most recently competed in the Heavyweight division of Titan FC. A professional competitor since 2008, Madsen has also formerly competed for the UFC and was a cast member of Spike TV's The Ultimate Fighter: Heavyweights fighting for Team Rashad.

== Background ==
Born in Orange County, California and raised in Doland, South Dakota, Madsen attended Doland High School where he was a decorated high school and college wrestler. Madsen has won many awards and even had a high school wrestling match with former UFC heavyweight champion Brock Lesnar. Besides wrestling, Madsen was a track and football star. Madsen enrolled in South Dakota State University and won an NCAA Division II national title in wrestling his freshman year.

== Mixed martial arts career ==
=== Early career ===
After college he still had the passion to compete and decided to pursue mixed martial arts full-time. Wanting to train with one of the best mixed martial arts gyms, Madsen packed his stuff and moved out of his home in South Dakota to train with The H.I.T. Squad (Hughes Intensive Training) in Granite City, Illinois where he was known for not being able to score with the ladies and ridiculed by teammates. Madsen decided to skip competing as an amateur and went straight to professional, with a previous record of 3–0 Madsen was picked to compete on The Ultimate Fighter 10.

=== The Ultimate Fighter ===
Madsen was on the tenth season of The Ultimate Fighter. In the first episode, Madsen advanced to the quarterfinals after he defeated Team Rampage's second pick Abe Wagner via unanimous decision.

In the quarterfinals, Madsen fought teammate Brendan Schaub and was knocked out in the second round via two straight right punches.

=== Ultimate Fighting Championship ===
Madsen made his official UFC debut at the Ultimate Fighter 10 Finale. He fought castmate and teammate Justin Wren to a decision of 30–27, 28–29 and 29–28 winning by split decision.

Madsen next fought Mostapha Al-turk at UFC 112 in Abu Dhabi. After 3 rounds, Madsen was declared the winner via unanimous decision (29-28, 29-28, 29-28).

At UFC 116, Madsen defeated Karlos Vemola via unanimous decision.

Madsen was expected to face Todd Duffee on October 23, 2010 at UFC 121. However, Duffee was forced off the card with an injury and replaced by Gilbert Yvel. Both men circled early on in the fight before Madsen gained a double leg takedown. Madsen then hit Yvel multiple times forcing the referee to stop the fight.

Madsen next faced his DeathClutch teammate Mike Russow at UFC Fight Night 24. He lost the fight via doctor stoppage at the end of round two in the first loss of his professional career. Despite compiling a 4-1 UFC record, Madsen was subsequently released from the UFC after the loss.

=== Post-UFC career ===
Madsen faced Matt Foster at PCFN 7 on March 8, 2014. He won by KO in the first round.

=== Titan Fighting Championship ===
Madsen was expected to face Dave Herman for the vacant Titan FC heavyweight championship at Titan FC 32 on November 20, 2014. On November 4, 2014 it was announced that Titan FC 32 would be postponed to December 19, 2014 and will be moved from Augusta, Georgia to Lowell, Massachusetts Subsequent to the show's move, Herman pulled out of the bout and was replaced by Jack May. The bout was ultimately pulled from this show with no reason given.

On March 20, 2015, he faced Chase Gormley for the inaugural Titan FC Heavyweight Championship at Titan FC 33. He lost the fight via unanimous decision.

== Mixed martial arts record ==
Professional record breakdown
10 matches	8 wins	2 losses
By knockout	4	1
By submission	0	0
By decision	4	1

Res.	Record	Opponent	Method	Event	Date	Round	Time	Location	Notes
Loss	8–2	Chase Gormley	Decision (unanimous)	Titan FC 33	March 20, 2015	5	5:00	Mobile, Alabama, United States	For the inaugural Titan FC Heavyweight Championship.
Win	8–1	Matt Foster	KO (punch)	PCFN 7	March 8, 2014	1	0:48	Redfield, South Dakota, United States	
Loss	7–1	Mike Russow	TKO (doctor stoppage)	UFC Fight Night: Nogueira vs. Davis	March 26, 2011	2	5:00	Seattle, Washington, United States	
Win	7–0	Gilbert Yvel	TKO (punches)	UFC 121	October 23, 2010	1	1:48	Anaheim, California, United States	
Win	6–0	Karlos Vémola	Decision (unanimous)	UFC 116	July 3, 2010	3	5:00	Las Vegas, Nevada, United States	
Win	5–0	Mostapha al-Turk	Decision (unanimous)	UFC 112	April 10, 2010	3	5:00	Abu Dhabi, United Arab Emirates	
Win	4–0	Justin Wren	Decision (split)	The Ultimate Fighter: Heavyweights Finale	December 5, 2009	3	5:00	Las Vegas, Nevada, United States	
Win	3–0	Ryan Kotzea	Decision (unanimous)	The Cage Inc.: Shock Wave	August 16, 2008	5	5:00	Sioux Falls, South Dakota, United States	
Win	2–0	Waylon Goldsmith	TKO (punches)	The Cage Inc.: Summer Slam 4	June 14, 2008	1	1:02	Sioux Falls, South Dakota, United States	
Win	1–0	Cody Griffin	KO (punches)	Crossroads Combat Challenge 3	May 6, 2008	1	1:53	Effingham, Illinois, United States	

=== Mixed martial arts exhibition record ===
Exhibition record breakdown		
2 matches	1 win	1 loss
By knockout	0	1
By submission	0	0
By decision	1	0

Result	Record	Opponent	Method	Event	Date	Round	Time	Location	Notes
Loss	1–1	Brendan Schaub	KO (punch)	The Ultimate Fighter: Heavyweights		2	1:39	Las Vegas, Nevada	Quarter-finals
Win	1–0	Abe Wagner	Decision (unanimous)	The Ultimate Fighter: Heavyweights		2	5:00	Las Vegas, Nevada	Preliminary bout

== See also ==
- List of current UFC fighters
- List of male mixed martial artists
