= Roy Nelson =

American mixed martial arts fighter

- Born: June 20, 1976 (age 50); Las Vegas, Nevada, U.S.
- Other names: Big Country
- Height: 6 ft 0 in (183 cm)
- Weight: 249 lb (113 kg; 17 st 11 lb)
- Division: Heavyweight
- Reach: 72 in (183 cm)
- Stance: Orthodox
- Fighting out of: Las Vegas, Nevada, U.S.
- Team: Xtreme Couture
- Trainer: Boxing: Jeff Mayweather; Brazilian Jiu-Jitsu: Renzo Gracie
- Rank: Black belt in Brazilian Jiu-Jitsu under Renzo Gracie; Black sash in Kung Fu
- Years active: 2004–Present (MMA)

Mixed martial arts record
- Total: 44
- Wins: 24
- By knockout: 16
- By submission: 4
- By decision: 4
- Losses: 20
- By knockout: 3
- By decision: 17

Other information
- Mixed martial arts record from Sherdog

Roy Nelson (born June 20, 1976) is an American mixed martial artist who competes in the Heavyweight division. As a professional, he has competed for the UFC, EliteXC, the IFL, BodogFIGHT, and most recently for Bellator MMA. In the UFC, Nelson was the winner of The Ultimate Fighter: Heavyweights and achieved success as a top 10 UFC Heavyweight. Nelson is also the former IFL Heavyweight Champion, competing under Ken Shamrock and the Lion's Den. He holds notable victories over Mirko Cro Cop, Cheick Kongo, and Antônio Rodrigo Nogueira.

== Background ==
Nelson was born and raised in Las Vegas, Nevada, and attended Cimarron-Memorial High School, where he competed in wrestling, football, and baseball. Nelson briefly trained in karate and began training in Ark Wong's Ng Ga Kuen Shaolin Kung Fu when he was 15 years old. Nelson worked briefly in a warehouse in 1999. Nelson originally began training in Brazilian jiu-jitsu under UFC veteran John Lewis in 2000. After seven years working as a substitute teacher and after-school program volunteer in Clark County, Nelson began his own career in mixed martial arts. Nelson has been a long-time student of Brazilian jiu-jitsu master Renzo Gracie, who granted him a black belt on August 26, 2009. Nelson was known initially for his strong jiu-jitsu skills, having consistently won jiu-jitsu tournaments before his MMA career, conclusively beating Frank Mir, Brandon Vera, and Diego Sanchez in the same day to win a Grapplers Quest championship in 2003, and competing at the ADCC World Championships the same year.

Prior to Nelson's professional mixed martial arts career, he played rugby for the Las Vegas Blackjacks for two seasons (2002–2003).

== Mixed martial arts career ==
=== Early career ===
Nelson made his professional mixed martial arts debut at a tournament on April 17, 2004. Nelson won both of his fights, winning the Rage on the River Heavyweight Tournament. Nelson compiled a record of 6–1 before being signed by the IFL.

=== IFL ===
As a member of Ken Shamrock's Lion's Den, Nelson was asked to become a member of the IFL's Nevada Lions in 2007, and made his promotional debut at IFL: Oakland on January 19, 2007, against veteran Vince Lucero. Nelson won via TKO in the first round.

In the 2007 IFL World Grand Prix, Nelson became the Heavyweight Champion, defeating Antoine Jaoude on December 29, 2007. Nelson successfully defended his title twice, before the IFL ceased operations.

=== Post-IFL ===
After the IFL ceased operations Nelson took a fight with EliteXC on 10 days' notice against former UFC Heavyweight Champion Andrei Arlovski. Roy Nelson lost via KO in the second round; however, controversy broke out over Nelson being stood up by the referee in the first round from side control, while staying active and working on a kimura. He then went on to fight for Roy Jones Jr.'s Square Ring Promotions against Jeff Monson. This fight also ended in a controversial loss for Nelson. According to the TV commentators and most MMA media, Nelson won the bout. However, Monson was awarded a unanimous decision.

=== The Ultimate Fighter ===
Nelson was one of the sixteen fighters in The Ultimate Fighter: Heavyweights. He provided commentary on the show for multiple websites, including weekly Q&A sessions about each individual episode for USA Today's Fighting Stances and a blog for SpikeTV.com. In his first fight of the show, Nelson defeated former street-fighter Kimbo Slice via TKO stoppage in the second round with repeated punches to the head in the crucifix position. The broadcast was the highest rated MMA show in U.S. history with a 3.7 rating. The fight itself had 6 million viewers.

In the quarterfinals, Nelson defeated Justin Wren in a two-round majority decision. In the semi-finals, Nelson defeated James McSweeney via strikes in the first round again utilizing the crucifix position. He defeated Brendan Schaub at The Ultimate Fighter: Heavyweights Finale to become the winner of The Ultimate Fighter: Heavyweights. In the finale, Nelson knocked out Schaub at 3:45 into the first round with a right hook to Schaub's left temple and then hit Schaub on the ground with one punch to the face before the referee pulled Nelson off Schaub. With the win, Nelson earned a six-figure contract with the UFC.

=== Ultimate Fighting Championship ===
Nelson was scheduled to fight Cheick Kongo, though the bout was cancelled after Kongo withdrew. Nelson instead faced Junior dos Santos at UFC 117 in a bout to determine the #1 contender (after Cain Velasquez) to the UFC Heavyweight Championship. Nelson lost by unanimous decision, but was able to withstand the varied attacks of dos Santos, as he became the first man to take dos Santos to a decision. Nelson was scheduled to face Shane Carwin at UFC 125. Carwin, however, had to pull out of the fight due to a back injury. Nelson was pulled off the card altogether.

On November 14, 2010, UFC President Dana White announced that Nelson's UFC career would be on hold due to Nelson being contractually bound to another fight promotion. White declined to specifically name the promotion, but sources close to Nelson confirmed that Roy Jones Jr.'s Square Ring Promotions claimed to have Nelson tied down. Nelson stated on The MMA Hour with Ariel Helwani that this is old news and that he is still able to fight in the UFC with no problems.

Nelson faced Frank Mir on May 28, 2011, at UFC 130 and lost by unanimous decision. UFC president Dana White criticized Nelson's performance after the fight for Nelson's lack of conditioning. Nelson blamed a bout with the flu for his poor performance. Nelson indicated that he has plans of cutting weight and fighting in the light heavyweight division at some point in the future.

Nelson faced Mirko Cro Cop on October 29, 2011, at UFC 137 and won by TKO in the third round.

Nelson next fought the returning Fabrício Werdum at UFC 143 on February 4, 2012. He lost the fight via unanimous decision. The back and forth action earned Fight of the Night honors.

Nelson was scheduled to face Antônio Silva on May 26, 2012, at UFC 146, but Silva was moved up to fight Cain Velasquez. Nelson was then briefly expected to face Gabriel Gonzaga. However, Gonzaga himself was forced out of the bout with an injury and replaced by Dave Herman, who Nelson knocked out in 51 seconds. He earned Knockout of the Night honors due to his performance. Joe Rogan said on the live broadcast that "When Herman sat down on his ass, he had no idea where he was".

It was announced on July 12, 2012, that Nelson would be coaching on the show, The Ultimate Fighter, against fellow heavyweight Shane Carwin, with the two expected to face each other on December 15, 2012, at The Ultimate Fighter: Team Carwin vs. Team Nelson Finale. On November 14, it was announced that Shane Carwin injured his knee and wouldn't be able to fight. On November 15, it was reported that Nelson would face Matt Mitrione at the TUF 16 Finale. Nelson defeated Mitrione via first-round TKO.

Nelson faced Cheick Kongo on April 27, 2013, at UFC 159. Nelson won the fight by knockout at 2:03 of the first round. The win also won him his fourth Knockout of the Night bonus award.

Nelson faced Stipe Miocic on June 15, 2013, at UFC 161. Miocic defeated Nelson via unanimous decision. There was speculation about his MMA future because his contract was expiring, but Nelson renewed it soon after.

Nelson faced Daniel Cormier on October 19, 2013, at UFC 166. He lost the fight via unanimous decision.

Nelson faced Antônio Rodrigo Nogueira on April 11, 2014, in the main event at UFC Fight Night 39. After dropping Nogueira several times with punches in the first round, Nelson finished the fight via knockout with an overhand right. The win also earned Nelson his first Performance of the Night bonus award. Nelson broke his right hand during the fight for which he required surgery in order to repair.

Nelson next faced Mark Hunt on September 20, 2014, in the main event at UFC Fight Night 52. Nelson lost the fight via knockout in the second round. It was his first loss by knockout and his first finished fight outside round 1 in a scheduled 5-round fight.

Nelson faced Alistair Overeem on March 14, 2015, at UFC 185. He lost the fight by unanimous decision.

After working as a coach on Road to UFC Japan, Nelson faced Josh Barnett on September 27, 2015, in the main event at UFC Fight Night 75. He lost the fight via unanimous decision.

Nelson faced Jared Rosholt on February 6, 2016, at UFC Fight Night 82. He won the fight by unanimous decision (30–27, 30–27, and 29–28).

Nelson faced Derrick Lewis on July 7, 2016, at UFC Fight Night 90 Even though breaking his personal record of most takedowns in a fight with 7, Nelson lost via split decision.

Nelson faced Antônio Silva on September 24, 2016, at UFC Fight Night 95. He won the fight by knockout in the second round. After the fight, out of frustration with what he thought was a late stoppage, Nelson push-kicked referee John McCarthy.

Nelson faced Alexander Volkov on April 15, 2017, at UFC on Fox 24. He lost the fight by unanimous decision.

=== Bellator MMA ===
In May 2017, it was announced that Nelson's contract with the UFC had expired in April and that he had a signed multi-fight contract with Bellator MMA.

In his debut Nelson faced Javy Ayala at Bellator 183 on September 23, 2017. He won the fight by unanimous decision in what was his first non-UFC related match in nearly 8 years.

Nelson faced Matt Mitrione in the quarterfinal round of the Bellator Heavyweight World Grand Prix Tournament at Bellator 194 on February 16, 2018. He lost the fight via majority decision.

Nelson was expected to face Mirko Cro Cop in a rematch at Bellator 200 on May 25, 2018. However, the bout was scrapped during the week leading up to the event as Cro Cop pulled out of the fight citing an injury.

Nelson faced Sergei Kharitonov in the Bellator 207 co-main event on October 12, 2018. He lost the fight via knockout in round one.

The rematch against Mirko Cro Cop eventually took place on February 16, 2019, at Bellator 216. Nelson lost the fight by unanimous decision.

Nelson faced Valentin Moldavsky at Bellator 244 on August 21, 2020. He lost the fight by unanimous decision.

On October 27, 2020, it was revealed that Nelson had been released from his Bellator MMA contract.

=== Gamebred Fighting Championship ===
Nelson headlined Gamebred FC 4 in a bare-knuckle MMA bout against Dillon Cleckler on May 5, 2023. He won the fight via knockout in round one.

Nelson faced former BKFC Heavyweight Champion and UFC veteran Alan Belcher for inaugural Gamebred Bareknuckle MMA Heavyweight Championship at Gamebred Bareknuckle MMA 6 November 10, 2023. He lost the fight via split decision.

== Fighting style ==
Despite possessing a black belt in Brazilian Jiu-Jitsu, later years saw Nelson develop a reputation for his powerful striking game, specifically his signature overhand-right.

Nelson is also known for having an iron chin. In fact, after his bout against fellow heavyweight Stipe Miocic at UFC 161, Nelson had broken the record for the amount of significant strikes absorbed by a fighter without being knocked out, receiving 437 strikes across his then 10-fight UFC career.

== Personal life ==
Nelson is married to Jess Nelson and they have a son.

Nelson's nickname 'Big Country' originates from his early years in MMA, when his training partners thought Nelson was from a remarkable wrestling state like Iowa or Oklahoma because of his wrestling ability.

== Championships and accomplishments ==
=== Mixed martial arts ===
- Ultimate Fighting Championship
  - The Ultimate Fighter: Heavyweights Tournament Winner
  - Fight of the Night (One time)
  - Knockout of the Night (Four times)
  - Performance of the Night (One time)
  - UFC.com Awards
    - 2009: Ranked #2 Newcomer of the Year
    - 2014: Ranked #5 Knockout of the Year vs. Antônio Rodrigo Nogueira
- International Fight League
  - IFL Heavyweight Championship (One time; first; last)
  - IFL 2007 Heavyweight Grand Prix Champion
  - Most consecutive title defenses in the Heavyweight division (2)
  - Tied (Ryan Schultz) for most consecutive title defenses in the IFL (2)
  - Tied (Ryan Schultz) for most title defenses in the IFL (2)
- Rage on the River
  - Rage on the River Heavyweight Tournament Winner

=== Submission grappling ===
- Abu Dhabi Combat Club
  - 2003 ADCC Submission Wrestling World Championships Quarterfinalist
- Pan-American Championship Jiu Jitsu
  - 2005 Brown Belt (+100 kg): 1st Place
  - 2003 Brown Belt (+100 kg): 3rd Place
- Grapplers Quest
  - 2003 Grapplers Quest Superfight Champion

== Mixed martial arts record ==
Professional record breakdown
44 matches	24 wins	20 losses
By knockout	16	3
By submission	5	0
By decision	3	17

Res.	Record	Opponent	Method	Event	Date	Round	Time	Location	Notes
Loss	24–20	Alan Belcher	Decision (split)	Gamebred Bareknuckle MMA 6	November 10, 2023	3	5:00	Biloxi, Mississippi, United States	Bare knuckle MMA.
Win	24–19	Dillon Cleckler	TKO (punch)	Gamebred Bareknuckle MMA 4	May 5, 2023	1	3:24	Fort Lauderdale, Florida, United States	Bare Knuckle MMA.
Loss	23–19	Valentin Moldavsky	Decision (unanimous)	Bellator 244	August 21, 2020	3	5:00	Uncasville, Connecticut, United States	
Loss	23–18	Frank Mir	Decision (unanimous)	Bellator 231	October 25, 2019	3	5:00	Uncasville, Connecticut, United States	
Loss	23–17	Mirko Cro Cop	Decision (unanimous)	Bellator 216	February 16, 2019	3	5:00	Uncasville, Connecticut, United States	
Loss	23–16	Sergei Kharitonov	KO (punches and knee)	Bellator 207	October 12, 2018	1	4:59	Uncasville, Connecticut, United States	
Loss	23–15	Matt Mitrione	Decision (majority)	Bellator 194	February 16, 2018	3	5:00	Uncasville, Connecticut, United States	Bellator Heavyweight World Grand Prix Quarterfinal.
Win	23–14	Javy Ayala	Decision (unanimous)	Bellator 183	September 24, 2017	3	5:00	San Jose, California, United States	
Loss	22–14	Alexander Volkov	Decision (unanimous)	UFC on Fox: Johnson vs. Reis	April 15, 2017	3	5:00	Kansas City, Missouri, United States	
Win	22–13	Antônio Silva	KO (punches)	UFC Fight Night: Cyborg vs. Länsberg	September 24, 2016	2	4:10	Brasília, Brazil	
Loss	21–13	Derrick Lewis	Decision (split)	UFC Fight Night: dos Anjos vs. Alvarez	July 7, 2016	3	5:00	Las Vegas, Nevada, United States	
Win	21–12	Jared Rosholt	Decision (unanimous)	UFC Fight Night: Hendricks vs. Thompson	February 6, 2016	3	5:00	Las Vegas, Nevada, United States	
Loss	20–12	Josh Barnett	Decision (unanimous)	UFC Fight Night: Barnett vs. Nelson	September 27, 2015	5	5:00	Saitama, Japan	
Loss	20–11	Alistair Overeem	Decision (unanimous)	UFC 185	March 14, 2015	3	5:00	Dallas, Texas, United States	
Loss	20–10	Mark Hunt	KO (punch)	UFC Fight Night: Hunt vs. Nelson	September 20, 2014	2	3:00	Saitama, Japan	
Win	20–9	Antônio Rodrigo Nogueira	KO (punch)	UFC Fight Night: Nogueira vs. Nelson	April 11, 2014	1	3:37	Abu Dhabi, United Arab Emirates	Performance of the Night.
Loss	19–9	Daniel Cormier	Decision (unanimous)	UFC 166	October 19, 2013	3	5:00	Houston, Texas, United States	
Loss	19–8	Stipe Miocic	Decision (unanimous)	UFC 161	June 15, 2013	3	5:00	Winnipeg, Manitoba, Canada	
Win	19–7	Cheick Kongo	KO (punches)	UFC 159	April 27, 2013	1	2:03	Newark, New Jersey, United States	Knockout of the Night.
Win	18–7	Matt Mitrione	TKO (punches)	The Ultimate Fighter: Team Carwin vs. Team Nelson Finale	December 15, 2012	1	2:58	Las Vegas, Nevada, United States	
Win	17–7	Dave Herman	KO (punch)	UFC 146	May 26, 2012	1	0:51	Las Vegas, Nevada, United States	Knockout of the Night.
Loss	16–7	Fabrício Werdum	Decision (unanimous)	UFC 143	February 4, 2012	3	5:00	Las Vegas, Nevada, United States	Fight of the Night.
Win	16–6	Mirko Cro Cop	TKO (punches)	UFC 137	October 29, 2011	3	1:30	Las Vegas, Nevada, United States	
Loss	15–6	Frank Mir	Decision (unanimous)	UFC 130	May 28, 2011	3	5:00	Las Vegas, Nevada, United States	
Loss	15–5	Junior dos Santos	Decision (unanimous)	UFC 117	August 7, 2010	3	5:00	Oakland, California, United States	
Win	15–4	Stefan Struve	TKO (punches)	UFC Fight Night: Florian vs. Gomi	March 31, 2010	1	0:39	Charlotte, North Carolina, United States	Knockout of the Night.
Win	14–4	Brendan Schaub	KO (punch)	The Ultimate Fighter: Heavyweights Finale	December 5, 2009	1	3:45	Las Vegas, Nevada, United States	Won The Ultimate Fighter 10 Tournament. Knockout of the Night.
Loss	13–4	Jeff Monson	Decision (unanimous)	SRP: March Badness	March 21, 2009	3	5:00	Pensacola, Florida, United States	
Loss	13–3	Andrei Arlovski	KO (punch)	EliteXC: Heat	October 4, 2008	2	3:14	Sunrise, Florida, United States	
Win	13–2	Brad Imes	KO (punch)	IFL: Connecticut	May 16, 2008	1	3:55	Uncasville, Connecticut, United States	Defended the IFL Heavyweight Championship.
Win	12–2	Fabiano Scherner	TKO (punches)	IFL: Las Vegas	February 29, 2008	1	3:20	Las Vegas, Nevada, United States	Defended the IFL Heavyweight Championship.
Win	11–2	Antoine Jaoude	KO (punch)	IFL: World Grand Prix Finals	December 29, 2007	2	0:22	Uncasville, Connecticut, United States	Won the inaugural IFL Heavyweight Championship.
Win	10–2	Bryan Vetell	TKO (punches)	IFL: World Grand Prix Semifinals	November 3, 2007	3	1:01	Chicago, Illinois, United States	IFL 2007 Heavyweight GP Semi-final.
Win	9–2	Shane Ott	Decision (unanimous)	IFL: Las Vegas	June 16, 2007	3	4:00	Las Vegas, Nevada, United States	
Loss	8–2	Ben Rothwell	Decision (split)	IFL: Moline	April 7, 2007	3	4:00	Moline, Illinois, United States	
Win	8–1	Mario Rinaldi	TKO (punches)	BodogFIGHT: Costa Rica Combat	February 17, 2007	1	2:38	San José, Costa Rica	
Win	7–1	Vince Lucero	TKO (punches)	IFL: Oakland	January 19, 2007	1	1:55	Oakland, California, United States	
Loss	6–1	Josh Curran	Decision (unanimous)	BodogFIGHT: Clash of Nations	December 16, 2006	3	5:00	Saint Petersburg, Russia	
Win	6–0	Jerome Smith	Submission (arm-triangle choke)	FightForce: Butte Brawl 2	July 22, 2006	1	4:13	Butte, Montana, United States	
Win	5–0	Jason Godsey	Submission (rear-naked choke)	FightForce: Butte Brawl 1	May 6, 2006	1	4:42	Butte, Montana, United States	
Win	4–0	Michael Buchkovich	Submission (rear-naked choke)	World Extreme Fighting 17	April 1, 2006	1	0:56	Las Vegas, Nevada, United States	
Win	3–0	Ray Seraile	TKO (submission to punches)	PXC 3: Return of the Enforcer	August 28, 2004	2	3:41	Mangilao, Guam	
Win	2–0	Jerry Vrbanovic	Decision (split)	Rage on the River	April 17, 2004	3	3:00	Redding, California, United States	Won the Rage on the River Heavyweight Tournament.
Win	1–0	Bo Cantrell	Submission (hammerlock)	Rage on the River	April 17, 2004	3	2:52	Redding, California, United States	Rage on the River Heavyweight Tournament Semi-final.

=== Mixed martial arts exhibition record ===
Exhibition record breakdown		
3 matches	3 wins	0 losses
By knockout	2	0
By decision	1	0

Res.	Record	Opponent	Method	Event	Date	Round	Time	Location	Notes
Win	3–0	James McSweeney	TKO (punches)	The Ultimate Fighter: Heavyweights	December 2, 2009 (air date)	1	4:13	Las Vegas, Nevada, United States	Semi-finals.
Win	2–0	Justin Wren	Decision (majority)	The Ultimate Fighter: Heavyweights	November 11, 2009 (air date)	2	5:00	Las Vegas, Nevada, United States	Quarter-finals.
Win	1–0	Kimbo Slice	TKO (punches)	The Ultimate Fighter: Heavyweights	June 10, 2009, aired on September 30, 2009	2	2:01	Las Vegas, Nevada, United States	Preliminary bout.

== See also ==
- List of male mixed martial artists

New championship	1st IFL Heavyweight Champion; December 29, 2007 – July 31, 2008	Succeeded by IFL ceased operations
