= Matt Mitrione =

American mixed martial artist and American football player

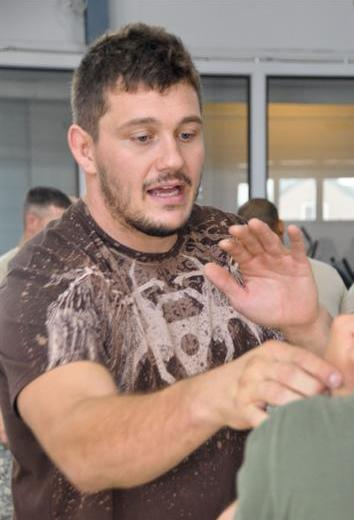
- Mitrione in September 2011
- Born: July 15, 1978 (age 48); Springfield, Illinois, U.S.
- Other name: Meathead
- Martial arts career
- Height: 6 ft 3 in (191 cm)
- Weight: 255 lb (116 kg; 18 st 3 lb)
- Division: Heavyweight
- Reach: 79 in (201 cm)
- Stance: Southpaw
- Fighting out of: Boca Raton, Florida, United States
- Team: Combat Club (Current); Sanford MMA (Formerly); Roufusport (Formerly); Imperial Athletics (Formerly); Integrated Fighting Academy (Formerly)
- Trainer: Henri Hooft; Duke Roufus
- Rank: Black belt in Shotokan Karate
- Years active: 2001–2005 (Football) 2009–2021 (MMA)

Mixed martial arts record
- Total: 23
- Wins: 13
- By knockout: 11
- By decision: 2
- Losses: 9
- By knockout: 5
- By submission: 2
- By decision: 2
- No contests: 1

Mixed martial arts exhibition record
- Total: 2
- Wins: 1
- By decision: 1
- Losses: 1
- By submission: 1

Other information
- University: Purdue University
- Website: mattmitrione.com
- Mixed martial arts record from Sherdog
- Football career

No. 91, 98
- Position: Defensive tackle

Personal information
- Listed height: 6 ft 2 in (1.88 m)
- Listed weight: 295 lb (134 kg)

Career information
- High school: Springfield (IL) Sacred Heart-Griffin
- College: Purdue
- NFL draft: 2002: undrafted

Career history
- New York Giants (2002); San Francisco 49ers (2004)*; Frankfurt Galaxy (2005); Amsterdam Admirals (2005); Minnesota Vikings (2005)
- * Offseason or practice squad member only

Awards and highlights
- First-team All-Big Ten (2001); Second-team All-Big Ten (2000)

Career NFL statistics
- Total tackles: 4
- Solo tackles: 2
- Assisted tackles: 2
- Stats at Pro Football Reference

Matt Mitrione (born July 15, 1978) is an American retired mixed martial artist and former American football player, who competed for both the Ultimate Fighting Championship (UFC), and most recently for Bellator MMA. Prior to embarking on an MMA career, Mitrione played college football at Purdue University, and he turned pro and played in the National Football League (NFL) with the New York Giants and the Minnesota Vikings. He was a featured fighter on The Ultimate Fighter: Heavyweights. A former Heavyweight contender, he has several wins over notable MMA fighters, including Kimbo Slice, Derrick Lewis, Roy Nelson, Phil De Fries, and Fedor Emelianenko.

== Early life ==
Mitrione was born in Bloomington, Illinois and raised in Springfield, where he attended Sacred Heart-Griffin High School for all four years, where he competed in football, swimming and diving, and track and field. He graduated from Springfield Southeast High School. In football, he received Honorable Mention USA Today All-American & All-State honors in his senior year playing defensive line. He also trained in Shotokan Karate as a child to help deal with his hyperactivity. Mitrione competed in Toughman Contests while he was still in high school, and finished second in his initial Toughman Contest in his hometown of Springfield.

== Football ==
He attended Purdue University on a football scholarship and started 35 consecutive games for the Boilermakers at defensive tackle, but broke his right foot during winter conditioning practice in his senior year. Mitrione went undrafted during the 2002 NFL draft, but was offered a contract by the New York Giants.

After again injuring his foot in a 2003 playoff loss to the San Francisco 49ers, Mitrione had seven surgeries to his foot including one that extended his Achilles tendon, and was in crutches for 16 months. Mitrione was released by the Giants in 2004 and then had brief stints with the San Francisco 49ers and Minnesota Vikings, before being released by the Vikings six weeks into the 2005 season and a week before his first child was born.

== Mixed martial arts career ==
Mitrione soon turned to mixed martial arts after Jayson Werth, a professional baseball player for the Washington Nationals, and close friend of Mitrione, invited Mitrione to fight in his inaugural promotion. Mitrione then relocated with his family to Indianapolis, Indiana, where he began training with fighters Chris Lytle and Jake O'Brien.

=== The Ultimate Fighter ===
Mitrione appeared on the tenth season of The Ultimate Fighter. Later in an interview, Mitrione revealed that he joined the show only to promote his sports nutrition company. On the show, he was given the unofficial nickname "Meathead" by coach Rashad Evans. After being picked second to last by Evans, Mitrione fought and defeated Scott Junk via majority decision (19–19, 20–18, and 20–18), moving him on to the quarter-finals.

Following Mitrione's fight with Junk, Mitrione complained about migraines and dizziness, causing many of the cast members to feel that Mitrione may bow out of the competition to give Kimbo Slice a second opportunity. Mitrione did fight and was eliminated by teammate James McSweeney in the quarterfinals, losing via guillotine choke.

=== Ultimate Fighting Championship ===
Mitrione made his professional MMA debut on December 5, 2009, at The Ultimate Fighter: Heavyweights Finale defeating Marcus Jones via KO early in the second round.

Mitrione then faced another fellow Ultimate Fighter alumnus Kimbo Slice at UFC 113 in Montreal. Mitrone chopped Slice down with leg kicks and eventually defeated Slice via technical knockout in the second round, taking his professional record to 2–0.

Mitrione faced Joey Beltran on September 25, 2010, at UFC 119. He won the fight via unanimous decision (29–28, 29–28, and 29–28) and also won the Fight of the Night award.

Mitrione defeated Tim Hague on January 22, 2011, at UFC Fight Night 23 via TKO in the first round. It was mentioned during the post-fight interview that Mitrione had broken his left hand and later confirmed that he had injured the second metacarpal in his left hand.

Mitrione fought Christian Morecraft on June 26, 2011, at UFC on Versus 4. Mitrione dominated the first round with his standup scoring two knockdowns. Mitrione ended the fight via KO at 4:28 of round 2

Mitrione suffered his first professional MMA loss to Cheick Kongo via unanimous decision (30–27, 30–28, and 29–28) on October 29, 2011, at UFC 137. Mitrione was unable to mount any consistent offense against Kongo on the feet as Kongo used his jab to keep Mitrione at bay, and in the third round Kongo secured a takedown and controlled Mitrione through the end of the fight.

Mitrione was expected to face Rob Broughton on August 4, 2012, at UFC on FOX 4. However, the bout was scrapped after Broughton pulled out for an undisclosed personal matter.

Mitrione/Broughton was briefly linked to UFC on FX 5 but was eventually scrapped altogether.

Mitrione was expected to face Phil De Fries on December 29, 2012, at UFC 155. But Mitrione was pulled out of the bout to step in for injured Shane Carwin against Roy Nelson at The Ultimate Fighter: Team Carwin vs. Team Nelson Finale on December 15, 2012. He lost the fight via TKO in the first round.

Mitrione vs. De Fries eventually took place on April 6, 2013, at UFC on Fuel TV 9. Mitrione won the fight via knockout just 19 seconds into the first round.

On April 8, 2013, it was announced that Mitrione had his contract suspended by the UFC after making comments about male-to-female transgender fighter Fallon Fox during an interview on The MMA Hour. Mitrione called Fox a "lying, sick, sociopathic, disgusting freak" who he hoped would never fight again, and referred to Fox by male pronouns. Mitrione also criticized the state of Florida for licensing Fox to fight. The suspension was lifted after two weeks when Mitrione's next fight against Brendan Schaub was announced.

Mitrione was expected to face Brendan Schaub on July 27, 2013, at UFC on Fox 8. However, in mid-July, Mitrione pulled out of the bout citing an injury and Schaub was pulled from the event as well. The bout eventually took place on September 21, 2013, at UFC 165. Schaub won the fight via first round submission, giving Mitrione the first submission loss of his professional MMA career.

Mitrione faced Shawn Jordan on March 1, 2014, at The Ultimate Fighter: China Finale. He won via knockout at 4:59 of the first round. The win also earned Mitrione his first Performance of the Night bonus award.

Mitrione was scheduled to face Stefan Struve on July 5, 2014, at UFC 175, but Struve collapsed in the locker room before the fight, leading to a cancellation.

Mitrione faced Derrick Lewis on September 5, 2014, at UFC Fight Night 50. Mitrione quickly defeated Lewis via first-round knockout.

Mitrione faced Gabriel Gonzaga on December 13, 2014, at UFC on Fox 13. He won the fight via TKO in the first round. The win also earned Mitrione a Performance of the Night bonus award.

Mitrione faced Ben Rothwell on June 6, 2015, at UFC Fight Night 68. He lost the fight by submission in the first round.

Mitrione faced Travis Browne on January 17, 2016, at UFC Fight Night 81. He lost the fight via TKO in the third round, though the bout was mired in controversy, as Mitrione suffered two eye pokes from Browne throughout the fight. This was the last fight on Mitrione's contract and he opted to test the free agency market.

=== Bellator MMA ===
On March 14, 2016, Mitrione announced he had signed with Bellator MMA.

Mitrione made his promotional debut against Carl Seumanutafa at Bellator 157 on June 14, 2016. After being dropped by an overhand right by Seumanutafa, Mitrione recovered on the ground and eventually won the fight via knockout in the first round.

Embracing a quick return to the Bellator cage, Mitrione faced Oli Thompson three weeks later on July 16, 2016, at Bellator 158. He won the back-and-forth fight via TKO in the second round.

Mitrione was scheduled to take on Fedor Emelianenko at Bellator 172 on February 18, 2017, in San Jose, California. However hours before the fight Mitrione was forced out of the bout due to kidney stones. The match was rescheduled and took place at Bellator NYC on June 24, 2017. Early in the first round both fighters knocked each other down, but Mitrione recovered faster and finished Fedor with ground and pound, winning via knockout in round one.

==== 2018 Bellator Heavyweight Grand Prix ====
On February 16, 2018, Mitrione had a rematch with Roy Nelson at Bellator 194 in the quarterfinals of the Bellator Heavyweight Grand Prix tournament. Mitrione went on to win the fight by way of majority decision, avenging his prior loss to Nelson in the process.

Mitrione faced Ryan Bader in the semi-finals at Bellator 207 on October 12, 2018. He lost the fight via unanimous decision 30–25 (twice) and 30–24, and was eliminated from the grand prix.

==== Post-GP tenure ====
Mitrione returned to face Sergei Kharitonov in the main event at Bellator 215 on February 15, 2019. The bout ended in a No Contest fifteen seconds into the first round after Mitrione landed an accidental groin strike leaving Kharitonov unable to continue.

Mitrione faced Kharitonov in an immediate rematch six months later at Bellator 225 on August 24, 2019. Mitrione's mouthpiece repeatedly fell out of his mouth, and he eventually lost the fight via knockout in the second round.

Mitrione stepped in to replace Josh Barnett, who failed his medical tests, to face Ronny Markes at Bellator 241 on March 13, 2020. However, the whole event was eventually cancelled due to the prevailing COVID-19 pandemic.

Mitrione next faced Timothy Johnson on August 7, 2020, at Bellator 243. He lost the fight via technical knockout in the first round.

Mitrione was expected to face Tyrell Fortune on April 2, 2021, at Bellator 255. However, during the week of the bout, Mitrione had to pull out and was replaced by Jack May.

The bout against Tyrell Fortune was rescheduled again and eventually took place at Bellator 262 on July 16, 2021. Mitrione lost the bout after submitting to strikes in the first round. Mitrione protested the stoppage due to an accidental clash of heads that occurred before Fortune secured a takedown.

After going 0–4 (1) in his most recent five bouts with the promotion, it was announced on July 19, 2021, that Mitrione had been released from Bellator MMA.

=== Mixed rules venture ===
According to Mitrione, he was scheduled to face Kubrat Pulev on November 27, 2021, in a boxing vs MMA card promoted by Triller that featured other UFC veterans. However, the opponents were switched and Mitrione faced boxer Alexander Flores at the event. Despite knocking Flores down, Mitrione lost the fight via unanimous decision.

=== Retirement ===
In November 2021, Mitrione all but stated he was retired from MMA, leaving his career open to mixed rules bouts but probably nothing more. He stated he himself ‘"done with MMA", and that no one had outclassed him in the stand up combat of his MMA bouts.

== Personal life ==
Mitrione is of Irish (mother, Cecelia) and Italian (father, Robert) descent. He has two sons and one daughter. Married. He is friends with Drew Brees, as the two were teammates at Purdue University from 1997 to 2001 and members of Joe Tiller's first recruiting class. He is also close friends with former NFL tight end Jeremy Shockey, who was his teammate while playing for the New York Giants. He has casually competed in several eating competitions but lost in all of them; the most recent was D.T. Kirby's 4th annual Wing Eating Contest. He had a role in the 2015 movie "Street" starring Beau "Casper" Smart.

== Charity work ==
Mitrione has participated in an anti-bullying program with UFC fighters Sean Pierson, Mark Hominick, and Sam Stout in Toronto, Canada.

== Championships and accomplishments ==
- Ultimate Fighting Championship
  - Fight of the Night (one time) vs. Joey Beltran
  - Performance of the Night (two times) vs. Gabriel Gonzaga and Shawn Jordan
- Bellator MMA
  - Bellator Heavyweight Grand Prix Semifinalist

== Mixed martial arts record ==
Professional record breakdown
23 matches	13 wins	9 losses
By knockout	11	5
By submission	0	2
By decision	2	2
No contests	1	

Res.	Record	Opponent	Method	Event	Date	Round	Time	Location	Notes
Loss	13–9 (1)	Tyrell Fortune	TKO (submission to punches)	Bellator 262	July 16, 2021	1	1:45	Uncasville, Connecticut, United States	
Loss	13–8 (1)	Timothy Johnson	TKO (punches)	Bellator 243	August 7, 2020	1	3:14	Uncasville, Connecticut, United States	
Loss	13–7 (1)	Sergei Kharitonov	TKO (knee and punches)	Bellator 225	August 24, 2019	2	1:24	Bridgeport, Connecticut, United States	
NC	13–6 (1)	Sergei Kharitonov	NC (accidental groin strike)	Bellator 215	February 15, 2019	1	0:15	Uncasville, Connecticut, United States	An accidental groin strike from Mitrione rendered Kharitonov unable to continue.
Loss	13–6	Ryan Bader	Decision (unanimous)	Bellator 207	October 12, 2018	3	5:00	Uncasville, Connecticut, United States	Bellator Heavyweight World Grand Prix Semifinal.
Win	13–5	Roy Nelson	Decision (majority)	Bellator 194	February 16, 2018	3	5:00	Uncasville, Connecticut, United States	Bellator Heavyweight World Grand Prix Quarterfinal.
Win	12–5	Fedor Emelianenko	TKO (punches)	Bellator NYC	June 24, 2017	1	1:14	New York City, New York, United States	
Win	11–5	Oli Thompson	TKO (punches)	Bellator 158	July 16, 2016	2	4:21	London, England, United Kingdom	
Win	10–5	Carl Seumanutafa	KO (punch)	Bellator 157: Dynamite 2	June 24, 2016	1	3:22	St. Louis, Missouri, United States	
Loss	9–5	Travis Browne	TKO (punches)	UFC Fight Night: Dillashaw vs. Cruz	January 17, 2016	3	4:09	Boston, Massachusetts, United States	
Loss	9–4	Ben Rothwell	Submission (guillotine choke)	UFC Fight Night: Boetsch vs. Henderson	June 6, 2015	1	1:54	New Orleans, Louisiana, United States	
Win	9–3	Gabriel Gonzaga	TKO (punches)	UFC on Fox: dos Santos vs. Miocic	December 13, 2014	1	1:59	Phoenix, Arizona, United States	Performance of the Night.
Win	8–3	Derrick Lewis	KO (punches)	UFC Fight Night: Jacaré vs. Mousasi	September 5, 2014	1	0:41	Mashantucket, Connecticut, United States	
Win	7–3	Shawn Jordan	KO (punches)	The Ultimate Fighter China Finale: Kim vs. Hathaway	March 1, 2014	1	4:59	Macau, SAR, China	Performance of the Night.
Loss	6–3	Brendan Schaub	Technical Submission (D'Arce choke)	UFC 165	September 21, 2013	1	4:06	Toronto, Ontario, Canada	
Win	6–2	Philip De Fries	KO (punches)	UFC on Fuel TV: Mousasi vs. Latifi	April 6, 2013	1	0:19	Stockholm, Sweden	
Loss	5–2	Roy Nelson	TKO (punches)	The Ultimate Fighter: Team Carwin vs. Team Nelson Finale	December 15, 2012	1	2:58	Las Vegas, Nevada, United States	
Loss	5–1	Cheick Kongo	Decision (unanimous)	UFC 137	October 29, 2011	3	5:00	Las Vegas, Nevada, United States	
Win	5–0	Christian Morecraft	KO (punches)	UFC Live: Kongo vs. Barry	June 26, 2011	2	4:28	Pittsburgh, Pennsylvania, United States	
Win	4–0	Tim Hague	TKO (punches)	UFC: Fight for the Troops 2	January 22, 2011	1	2:59	Fort Hood, Texas, United States	
Win	3–0	Joey Beltran	Decision (unanimous)	UFC 119	September 25, 2010	3	5:00	Indianapolis, Indiana, United States	Fight of the Night.
Win	2–0	Kimbo Slice	TKO (punches)	UFC 113	May 8, 2010	2	4:24	Montreal, Quebec, Canada	
Win	1–0	Marcus Jones	KO (punch)	The Ultimate Fighter: Heavyweights Finale	December 5, 2009	2	0:10	Las Vegas, Nevada, United States	

=== Mixed martial arts exhibition record ===
Exhibition record breakdown		
2 matches	1 win	1 loss
By submission	0	1
By decision	1	0

Res.	Record	Opponent	Method	Event	Date	Round	Time	Location	Notes
Loss	1–1	James McSweeney	Submission (guillotine choke)	The Ultimate Fighter: Heavyweights		1	3:38	Las Vegas, Nevada, United States	Quarter-finals.
Win	1–0	Scott Junk	Decision (majority)	The Ultimate Fighter: Heavyweights		2	5:00	Las Vegas, Nevada, United States	Preliminary bout.

== See also ==
- List of male mixed martial artists
