= The Ultimate Fighter: Heavyweights =

UFC mixed martial arts television series and event in 2009

- Genre: Reality, Sports
- Created by: Craig Piligian, Frank Fertitta III, Lorenzo Fertitta, Dana White
- Starring: Dana White, Quinton Jackson, Rashad Evans
- Country of origin: United States

Production
- Running time: 60 minutes

Original release
- Network: Spike
- Release: September 16, 2009

The Ultimate Fighter: Heavyweights is the tenth installment of the Ultimate Fighting Championship (UFC)-produced reality television series The Ultimate Fighter. In a press conference following UFC 98, Dana White announced that filming for the season would begin on June 1, 2009. The season debuted on Spike TV on September 16, 2009, following UFC Fight Night 19.

The UFC and Spike TV held an open casting call at The Marriott Seattle Airport Hotel in Seattle, Washington, on April 6, 2009. The casting called for mixed-martial artists in the middleweight, light-heavyweight and heavyweight divisions. On the day of tryouts, 250 potential fighters appeared including UFC & International Fight League fighters and former National Football League football players. Notable applicants included NFL veterans Herbert Goodman & Rex Richards, UFC veteran Rob Yundt, and IFL veteran Aaron Stark. As with the previous season, all applicants at the tryouts were required to have a professional MMA record.

This season did not feature an elimination round as the past three seasons had. All competitors invited to Las Vegas for the show's taping participated in the entire season.

== Cast ==
=== Coaches ===
- Team Rampage
  - Quinton "Rampage" Jackson, head coach
  - Tom Blackledge
  - Tiki Ghosn
  - Mike Dolce, nutritionist
  Team Rashad
  - Rashad Evans, head coach
  - Greg Jackson
  - Trevor Wittman
  - Mike Van Arsdale
  - Rolles Gracie

=== Fighters ===
- Team Rashad
  - James McSweeney, Brendan Schaub, Justin Wren, Jon Madsen, Roy Nelson, Darrill "The Boss" Schoonover, Matt Mitrione, Mike Wessel
- Team Rampage
  - Kevin "Kimbo Slice" Ferguson, Abe Wagner, Demico Rogers, Wes Sims, Scott Junk, Wes Shivers, Marcus Jones, Zak Jensen

=== Others ===
- Host: Dana White
- Narrator: Mike Rowe

== Episodes ==
Episode 1: Size Does Matter

- Only 15 fighters are lined up until Dana White introduced internet street fighting sensation, Kimbo Slice.
- The fighters divided up and trained separately with Rashad Evans and Quinton Jackson for evaluations.
- White flipped a coin (silver for Rampage, gold for Rashad). The winner of the coin toss chose to either pick the first fighter or decide the first two match ups. The winning fighter's team had to win both fights to keep control of the fight match ups.
- Evans won the coin toss and decided to pick the first fighter. This meant that Jackson got to pick the first fight.

Coach	1st Pick	2nd Pick	3rd Pick	4th Pick	5th Pick	6th Pick	7th Pick	8th Pick
Rashad	James McSweeney	Brendan Schaub	Justin Wren	Jon Madsen	Roy Nelson	Darrill Schoonover	Matt Mitrione	Mike Wessel
Rampage	Kimbo Slice	Abe Wagner	Demico Rogers	Wes Sims	Scott Junk	Wes Shivers	Marcus Jones	Zak Jensen

- Jackson matches Wagner against Madsen.
- Jon Madsen defeated Abe Wagner via unanimous decision after two rounds.
- At the end of the episode, it is seen that the gash on Wagner's head is so deep, that the medic treating him can see his skull.

Episode 2: All About Survival

- Roy Nelson had a discussion with Rashad Evans and the gold team's coaches about his attitude and whether he really wanted to train with the team.
- Jackson matched James McSweeney against Wes Shivers.
- Team Rashad went past their allotted training time, into the silver team's training time. Quinton Jackson approached Evans and jokingly asked the team to leave.
- James McSweeney defeated Wes Shivers by majority decision after two rounds.
- Evans matched Nelson against Kimbo Slice.

Episode 3: The Enemy

- Keith Jardine appeared at Team Rashad's training session, in support of his friend's team.
- Rashad Evans and Quinton Jackson had an argument over the scheduling of the match against each other. James McSweeney joined the argument and Evans pulled him away.
- Marcus Jones again struggled in training, this time complaining of an apparent knee injury. Despite this, Jones expressed his desire to compete in the next fight.
- Roy Nelson defeated Kimbo Slice by TKO (strikes) at 2:01 in the second round.

Episode 4: Snitch

- Marcus Jones was shown sweating profusely, prompting concerns that he would not be able to fight.
- Rashad Evans informed his team of the likely choices for the remaining fights.
- Justin Wren disagreed with Evans' choice of fight in him against Scott Junk, owing to their friendship.
- Matt Mitrione told Team Rampage the planned matches, which led to him becoming a pariah to the rest of his team, who subsequently labelled him as a snitch.
- Evans matched Brendan Schaub against Demico Rogers.
- Brendan Schaub defeated Demico Rogers by submission (anaconda choke) at 3:17 in the first round.
- After the fight, Quinton Jackson did not meet with Rogers; instead, Evans gave him some words of encouragement.

Episode 5: Rude Awakening

- Matt Mitrione injured his shoulder in training, but wished to fight soon, leading Team Rashad to question whether his shoulder was legitimately injured or merely sore.
- Rashad Evans, in discussion with his assistant coaches, worried about putting Mitrione in the fight and continuing their undefeated streak.
- Zak Jensen also became an outcast in the house after being accused of masturbating in the communal bathroom and passing out during practice.
- Evans matched Justin Wren against Wes Sims.
- Marcus Jones believed that Evans promised him the next fight and becomes very emotional when he is not picked.
- Justin Wren defeated Wes Sims by submission (arm triangle choke) at 1:34 in the first round.
- Following the match, Quinton Jackson walked away from the cage without checking on his fighter.
- Later, in the locker room area, Evans approached Jackson about this, which led to them having another verbal confrontation.

Episode 6: 16 Sharks

- Phil Nurse, stand up coach for Georges St-Pierre and Evans, came to help his student at Team Rashad's training practice.
- Rashad Evans matches Darrill Schoonover against Zak Jensen.
- Quinton Jackson kept calling Schoonover "Titties" and during the fight announcement, Schoonover started swearing at Jackson, leading to a verbal confrontation between the two.
- Team Rampage gave Jensen the nickname "Linderman" and Wes Sims started a poll of when Jensen would have a breakdown.
- During a training session, Jensen suffered a large cut over his eye. It gets stitched up but there was some concern whether he can fight or wants to fight.
- Tiki Ghosn hired an artist to draw a picture of Team Rashad. They hang it in the training center, but Evans took it down before anyone on his team could see. Team Rampage later presented it to the gold team gift wrapped.
- Darrill Schoonover defeated Zak Jensen by submission (triangle choke) at 2:29 in the first round.

Episode 7: Voices In My Head

- Rashad Evans announced the final two preliminary fights: Matt Mitrione vs. Scott Junk and Mike Wessel vs. Marcus Jones.
- Evans and Quinton Jackson continued their war of words, with Evans claiming that Jackson quit on his fighters, not the other way around.
- Wes Sims and James McSweeney created a bet as to when Mitrione will break down or snap, much like the previous weeks' bet about Zak Jensen.
- During a training session, Jon Madsen and Mitrione nearly came to blows during sparring.
- What happened was that Mitrone was told about Madsen saying that he was going to slap him behind his back. He then decided to go out 100%, more than what the coaches instructed.
- Evans then approached Mitrione, questioning if he would have the same aggressive temper during the fight.
- Matt Mitrione defeated Scott Junk by majority decision after two rounds.
- Following the match, Jackson walked away from the cage, flung a water bottle, and destroyed a door leading to the locker room area.

Episode 8: One Soldier Left

- Brendan Schaub drew an insulting caricature of Marcus Jones. Mike Wessel later adds "sucks balls" to the bottom of the picture, which angered Jones.
- Darrill Schoonover again squared up to Quinton Jackson over his repeated "titties" jibes.
- Marcus Jones defeated Mike Wessel by submission (armbar) at 0:50 in the first round.
- Jones ends up being the first and only Team Rampage member to make it into the quarterfinals.
- Dana White and the two coaches met with each quarter-finalist to find out who their preferred opponent in the next round was.
- The quarterfinal fights were announced as:
  - Roy Nelson vs. Justin Wren
  - Brendan Schaub vs. Jon Madsen
  - James McSweeney vs. Matt Mitrione
  - Marcus Jones vs. Darrill Schoonover
- Rashad Evans offered Team Rampage members the chance to train with him and later, he and Jackson clash once more.

Episode 9: Rattled

- Matt Mitrione complains of severe headaches and nausea as a result of his match with Scott Junk. Some believed that he may have had a concussion and may not be able to continue in the tournament. He was sent to the hospital to get a medical evaluation.
- As a practical joke, Quinton Jackson and his assistant coaches put chickens in the cars of the Team Rashad coaches.
- Dana White visited the house and talked with Mitrione and has him claim that if the doctor clears him to fight, he will fight in his quarterfinal match.
- Roy Nelson defeated Justin Wren by majority decision after two rounds.

Episode 10: Gut Check

- Matt Mitrione said that the doctor who examined him said he had swelling of the brain as a result of his fight against Scott Junk. There is discussion among Team Rashad coaches as well as other fighters about whether Mitrione will be able to continue in the tournament.
- Kimbo Slice had issues with his knee. He had an MRI done and an examination by a doctor. Slice was missing cartilage in his knee and faced the possibility of needing an operation.
- The coaches challenge is 2 vs. 2 beach volleyball. Team Rashad defeated Team Rampage, earning Rashad Evans $10,000 and the gold team's fighters $1,500 each.
- Evans talked with Mitrione and asked him if he wanted to fight. Mitrione was unable to give him a straight answer. Evans called White about the situation.
- Dana White talked with all of the fighters in the training center. He told them that fighters get hurt and fighters fight hurt, but none of them are being forced to fight. He told Mitrione that they will not know if he is medically cleared to fight until the next day; if he is medically cleared, he needed to decide whether he wanted to fight.
- Brendan Schaub defeated Jon Madsen by KO (punch) at 1:39 in the second round.

Episode 11: Road to the Finale

Note: This episode aired in the United States as a two-hour episode.

- Dana White wanted to talk with fighters for a possible replacement for Matt Mitrione.
- White at first talked to Kimbo Slice who complained of knee problems and did not think he could fight to his fullest. Options were given to Slice, such as cortisone shots and other treatments, to improve the arthritis in his knee. However, he turned down the treatment and the possible fight.
- Mitrione talked on the phone with his doctor and said he wanted to fight. The doctor cleared him to fight.
- Scott Junk was having problems seeing following his fight. The doctor told him there were two small tears in his retina and that he must have surgery or he may go blind. There were questions about whether or not he will be able to fight again.
- Marcus Jones took the news about Junk personally. He told Mitrione to give a reason to hit him and claimed that he killed Junk's career.
- Junk got an update that the eye surgery was a success and he could start training again in two months time.
- At the weigh-in, Mitrione and McSweeney got in each other's faces, and the Englishman shoved Mitrione away.
- James McSweeney defeated Matt Mitrione by submission (guillotine choke) at 3:38 in the first round.
- Marcus Jones defeated Darrill Schoonover by TKO (punches) at 2:37 in the first round.
- The semifinal matches consisted of three, five-minute rounds. The semifinal matches were announced as:
  - Roy Nelson vs. James McSweeney
  - Marcus Jones vs. Brendan Schaub
- McSweeney locked a claustrophobic Zak Jensen in the bathroom. After being let out, Jensen attacked McSweeney who put him in a standing guillotine choke until he calmed down.
- Roy Nelson defeated James McSweeney by TKO (strikes) at 4:13 in the first round.
- Brendan Schaub defeated Marcus Jones by TKO (punches) at 2:11 in the first round.

== TV ratings ==
- "TUF 10" episode No. 1: 4.1 million viewers
- "TUF 10" episode No. 2: 2.9 million viewers
- "TUF 10" episode No. 3: 5.3 million viewers (peak: 7.25 million with DVR viewing)
- "TUF 10" episode No. 4: 2.8 million viewers (peak: 4.89 million with DVR viewing)
- "TUF 10" episode No. 5: 2.8 million viewers
- "TUF 10" episode No. 6: 2.8 million viewers
- "TUF 10" episode No. 7: 2.5 million viewers
- "TUF 10" episode No. 8: 2.7 million viewers
- "TUF 10" episode No. 9: 2.5 million viewers
- "TUF 10" episode No. 10: 2.4 million viewers
- "TUF 10" episode No. 11/12: 2.6 million viewers

== Tournament bracket ==
Preliminary Round
Abe Wagner	2
Jon Madsen	UD
Demico Rogers	1
Brendan Schaub	SUB
Zak Jensen	1
Darrill Schoonover	SUB
Marcus Jones	SUB
Mike Wessel	1
Wes Shivers	2
James McSweeney	MD
Scott Junk	2
Matt Mitrione	MD
Kimbo Slice	2
Roy Nelson	TKO
Wes Sims	1
Justin Wren	SUB

Quarter-finals
Jon Madsen	2
Brendan Schaub	KO
Darrill Schoonover	1
Marcus Jones	TKO
James McSweeney	SUB
Matt Mitrione	1
Roy Nelson	MD
Justin Wren	2

Semi-finals
Brendan Schaub	TKO
Marcus Jones	1
James McSweeney	1
Roy Nelson	TKO

Finale
Brendan Schaub	1
Roy Nelson	KO

Legend
	Team Rampage
	Team Rashad
UD	Unanimous Decision
MD	Majority Decision
SUB	Submission
(T) KO	(Technical) Knockout

== The Ultimate Fighter 10 Finale ==
The Ultimate Fighter: Heavyweights Finale
- The poster for The Ultimate Fighter: Heavyweights Finale
- Promotion: Ultimate Fighting Championship
- Date: December 5, 2009
- Venue: Palms Casino Resort
- City: Las Vegas, Nevada
- Attendance: 1,791
- Total gate: $503,600

Event chronology
UFC 106: Ortiz vs. Griffin 2	The Ultimate Fighter: Heavyweights Finale	UFC 107: Penn vs. Sanchez

The Ultimate Fighter: Heavyweights Finale (also known as The Ultimate Fighter 10 Finale) was a mixed martial arts event that was held by the Ultimate Fighting Championship (UFC) on December 5, 2009.

=== Background ===
This card featured was the finals from The Ultimate Fighter: Heavyweights in the Heavyweight division. It also featured the official UFC debut of Kimbo Slice.

A previously announced bout between Rousimar Palhares and Lucio Linhares was moved to UFC 107. Linhares was a replacement for Alessio Sakara who had to pull out due to rumored visa issues.

Frankie Edgar was expected to face Kurt Pellegrino on the card, but Pellegrino was forced to withdraw due to an injury. Matt Veach, who was previously scheduled to fight Mark Bocek on the event's undercard was named as Edgar' new opponent.

=== Results ===
Main card
Weight class				Method	Round	Time	Notes
Heavyweight	Roy Nelson	def.	Brendan Schaub	KO (punch)	1	3:45
Light Heavyweight	Matt Hamill	def.	Jon Jones	DQ (illegal downwards elbows)	1	4:14
Catchweight (215 lb)	Kimbo Slice	def.	Houston Alexander	Decision (unanimous) (29–28, 29–28, 30–27)	3	5:00
Lightweight	Frankie Edgar	def.	Matt Veach	Submission (rear-naked choke)	2	2:22
Heavyweight	Matt Mitrione	def.	Marcus Jones	KO (punch)	2	0:10
Preliminary card
Heavyweight	James McSweeney	def.	Darrill Schoonover	TKO (punches)	3	3:20	(Note: This bout aired on the broadcast following the Hamill vs Jones bout.)
Heavyweight	Jon Madsen	def.	Justin Wren	Decision (split) (30–27, 28–29, 29–28)	3	5:00
Light Heavyweight	Brian Stann	def.	Rodney Wallace	Decision (unanimous) (30–27, 29–28, 29–28)	3	5:00
Welterweight	John Howard	def.	Dennis Hallman	KO (punches)	3	4:55	(Note: This bout aired on the broadcast following the Edgar vs Veach bout.)
Lightweight	Mark Bocek	def.	Joe Brammer	Submission (rear-naked choke)	1	3:36

=== Bonus awards ===
The following fighters received $25,000 bonuses.

- Fight of the Night: Frankie Edgar vs. Matt Veach
- Knockout of the Night: Roy Nelson
- Submission of the Night: Mark Bocek

== Reported payout ==
The following is the reported payout to the fighters as reported to the Nevada State Athletic Commission. It does not include sponsor money or "locker room" bonuses often given by the UFC and also do not include the UFC's traditional "fight night" bonuses.

- Roy Nelson: $16,000 ($8,000 win bonus) def. Brendan Schaub: $8,000
- Matt Hamill: $46,000 ($23,000 win bonus) def. Jon Jones: $20,000
- Kimbo Slice: $25,000 (no win bonus) def. Houston Alexander: $13,000
- Frankie Edgar: $46,000 ($23,000 win bonus) def. Matt Veach: $5,000
- Matt Mitrione: $16,000 ($8,000 win bonus) def. Marcus Jones: $8,000
- James McSweeney: $16,000 ($8,000 win bonus) def. Darrill Schoonover: $8,000
- Jon Madsen: $16,000 ($8,000 win bonus) def. Justin Wren: $8,000
- Brian Stann: $30,000 ($15,000 win bonus) def. Rodney Wallace: $6,000
- John Howard: $14,000 ($7,000 win bonus) def. Dennis Hallman: $15,000
- Mark Bocek: $30,000 ($15,000 win bonus) def. Joe Brammer: $5,000

== Coaches' fight ==
UFC 114: Rampage vs. Evans was held on May 29, 2010, in Paradise, Nevada.

- Light Heavyweight bout: Quinton Jackson vs. Rashad Evans

Rashad Evans defeated Quinton Jackson via unanimous decision (30–27, 30–27, 29–28) after three rounds.

== See also ==
- List of current UFC fighters
- List of UFC events
- 2009 in UFC
