= Renzo Gracie: Legacy =

- DVD cover
- Directed by: Gethin Aldous
- Written by: Gethin Aldous; Steve Allen; Adrian Miller
- Produced by: Gethin Aldous
- Starring: Renzo Gracie; Robson Gracie; Ryan Gracie; Ralph Gracie; Daniel Gracie; B.J. Penn; Pat Miletich; Oleg Taktarov; Andre Gusmão; Kyra Gracie
- Cinematography: Gethin Aldous
- Edited by: Gethin Aldous
- Music by: Adrian Miller
- Release date: October 25, 2008 (US Sports Film Festival)
- Running time: 78 minutes
- Country: United States
- Languages: English; Portuguese

Renzo Gracie: Legacy is a 2008 documentary film about Renzo Gracie, a mixed martial arts (MMA) fighter and Brazilian jiu-jitsu practitioner, directed by Gethin Aldous and written by Aldous, Steve Allen and Adrian Miller. Shot over a ten-year period, it shows the origins of the sport of mixed martial arts from its bare knuckle days to the explosion of the sport in Japan and America.

== Background ==
Renzo Gracie is from the third generation of Brazilian jiu-jitsu's Gracie family. In 1993, his uncle Rorion Gracie joined forces with Art Davie and Bob Meyrowitz to create a martial arts promotion to endorse his family's fighting style - the Ultimate Fighting Championship. The sport is now considered one of the fastest growing in the world.

== Production ==
The film was shot, edited, produced, and directed by Gethin Aldous. He followed Gracie over a 7-year period and another student of Gracie's, Alex Shum, followed him for 4 years before that. The film was self-distributed.

== Release ==
It premiered October 25, 2008 at the United States Sports Film Festival in Philadelphia, Pennsylvania., and was released on DVD on November 14, 2008, through its own website and Amazon.com.

== Reception ==
Paul Larkin of MMAjunkie wrote, "Gethin Aldous did a fantastic job with Legacy. He does not bore you to death with narration or beat you over the head with information.", and of the film, "...will no doubt be considered a masterpiece in the world of documentaries". Elias Cepeda of Inside Fighting wrote, "Gethin Aldous’ new documentary film Renzo Gracie: Legacy should be considered an instant classic simply on the basis of its scope and breadth", and the film "...accomplishes the rare feat of being able to both satisfy the most ardent and informed sports fan’s desire for fresh, new perspective and knowledge and serve as an understandable primer for the uninitiated."

== Cast ==
(as themselves)

- Renzo Gracie
- Robson Gracie
- Ryan Gracie
- Ralph Gracie
- Daniel Gracie
- B.J. Penn
- Pat Miletich
- Oleg Taktarov
- Andre Gusmão
- Kyra Gracie
- Marcio Feitosa (Uncredited)

== Additional sources ==
- MMA Mania, "Renzo Gracie: Legacy to premiere at the inaugural U.S. Sports Film Festival on October 25"
- Five Ounces of Pain, "New Renzo Gracie documentary to debut during film festival"
