= Marcio Simas =

Brazilian jiu-jitsu practitioner from Brazil

- Nationality: Brazilian
- Style: Brazilian Jiu-Jitsu
- Rank: 7th deg. BJJ coral belt

Marcio Simas is a 7th Degree Coral belt in Brazilian Jiu-Jitsu under Carlos Gracie, Jr. and the head of Gracie Barra Orlando and the Florida Federation of Brazilian Jiu-Jitsu.

== Biography ==
With over 30 years of training with the Gracie family, Marcio Simas is considered by many to be one of the top Brazilian Jiu-Jitsu instructors in the Southeastern United States. He is the only jiu-jitsu teacher in Florida who studied under the legendary Rolls Gracie (who is regarded as the best jiu-jitsu fighter in the history of the Gracie family). Marcio began training in the 1970s at Rolls Gracie's Copacabana academy is Rio de Janeiro. Marcio received both his blue belt and his purple belt at Rolls' Copacabana academy in Rio de Janeiro. After Rolls’ death at the age of 32, Marcio became a student of Rickson Gracie at the famous Gracie Humaitá academy where he earned his brown belt.

When his family moved to the outer suburb of Rio de Janeiro, known as Barra de Tijuca, Marcio was able to reunite with his old friend Carlos Gracie Jr. When Rolls died Carlos Gracie Jr. was unanimously voted by the students to take over the teaching. Soon after, Carlos moved the academy to Barra da Tijuca where he founded the Gracie Barra Academy. Marcio was awarded his black belt by Carlos Gracie Jr. As a Gracie Barra Black Belt, Marcio is in an elite group of fighters that includes Renzo Gracie, Ralph Gracie, Crolin Gracie, Rillion Gracie, Rigan Machado, Jean Jacques Machado, Marcio Feitosa and numerous world champions.

In the mid-1990s, Marcio moved to the United States and established his school, Gracie Barra Orlando, in Orlando, Florida.

Marcio has been teaching in Orlando for over 20 years. He is proud to be representing Carlos Gracie Jr. at the Gracie Barra Orlando Academy. He is currently a 6th degree black belt and has awarded numerous black belts over the past 15 years. His deep understanding and respect for the tradition of the Gracie family motivates his students to:

- Incorporate new techniques in order to improve the effectiveness of Jiu-Jitsu.
- Learn self-defense technique in order to defend themselves against hostile aggression.
- Excel in Jiu-Jitsu and Vale-Tudo competition.

Marcio is also the founder and president of the Florida Federation of Brazilian Jiu-Jitsu, which hosts the Florida State Brazilian Jiu-Jitsu Championships as well as the Panamerican Brazilian Jiu-Jitsu Championships in Florida.

== Brazilian Jiu-Jitsu competitive summary ==
- IBJJF Master 4 Pans Champion (Super Heavy 2004)

== See also ==
- Gracie Barra

== Sources ==
- Gracie Barra Orlando. Marcio Simas' biography, Pan Am results. marciosimas.com. URL last accessed July 14, 2006.
- BJJ.org Marcio Simas. bjj.org. URL last accessed July 14, 2006.
