= Renzo Gracie =

Brazilian Jiu-Jitsu practitioner and mixed martial artist

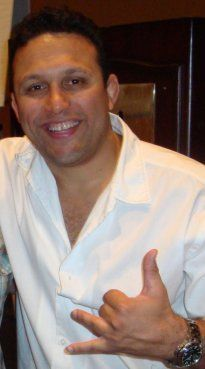
- Born: March 11, 1967 (age 59); Rio de Janeiro, Brazil
- Height: 5 ft 10 in (1.78 m)
- Weight: 171 lb (78 kg; 12 st 3 lb)
- Division: Welterweight; Middleweight
- Reach: 76 in (193 cm)
- Style: Brazilian jiu-jitsu
- Fighting out of: New York City, U.S.
- Team: Renzo Gracie Academy
- Rank: 7th degree coral belt in Brazilian Jiu-Jitsu (Note: under Carlos Gracie Jr. and Rickson Gracie)
- Years active: 1992–2018

Mixed martial arts record
- Total: 23
- Wins: 14
- By knockout: 2
- By submission: 8
- By decision: 3
- By disqualification: 1
- Losses: 7
- By knockout: 2
- By submission: 1
- By decision: 4
- Draws: 1
- No contests: 1

Other information
- Spouse: Cristina Gracie
- Children: Catarina Gracie, Cora Gracie, Ruran Gracie
- Notable relatives: Gracie family
- Notable students: Matt Serra, Ricardo Almeida, Sheikh Mohammed bin Zayed Al Nahyan, Georges St-Pierre, Rolles Gracie, Chris Weidman, Kyra Gracie, Frankie Edgar, Roy Nelson, Neiman Gracie, Gunnar Nelson, Harley Flanagan, Guy Ritchie, Ralph Gracie, Ryan Gracie and John Danaher.
- Website: https://renzogracie.com/
- Mixed martial arts record from Sherdog

Renzo Gracie (Portuguese: [ˈʁẽzu ˈɡɾejsi]; born March 11, 1967) is a Brazilian mixed martial artist and 7th degree coral belt Brazilian jiu-jitsu practitioner and coach. A third generation member of the Gracie family, he is the grandson of Gracie jiu-jitsu co-founder Carlos Gracie, grandnephew of Helio Gracie, nephew of Carlos Gracie Jr. and the son of Robson Gracie.

By the age of 20, Gracie was a multiple-time BJJ champion in Brazil. In mixed martial arts, Renzo has competed in the Ultimate Fighting Championship, Pride Fighting Championships, K-1, RINGS, and International Fight League (head-coaching the New York Pitbulls). Gracie is crediting with training some of the best fighters in North America such as: Georges St-Pierre, Frankie Edgar, Chris Weidman, Matt Serra, Ricardo Almeida, Roy Nelson, Rodrigo Gracie, Paul Creighton, and Shane McMahon. Gracie is also known to have trained Sheikh Mohammed bin Zayed Al Nahyan, President of United Arab Emirates.

Renzo Gracie: Legacy, a 2008 documentary film follows his influence on Brazilian jiu-jitsu and mixed martial arts over a ten-year period, showing the origins of the sport from its bare knuckle days to the explosion of the sport in both Japan and America. In honor of his achievements and contributions to the sport, Gracie was inducted into the ADCC Hall of Fame on February 21, 2022. On January 18, 2023, Gracie was presented with his coral belt in Abu Dhabi by Rickson Gracie.

== Mixed martial arts career ==
Renzo debuted in the Brazilian vale tudo circuit. He had his first match against kickboxer Luiz Augusto Alvareda, whom he submitted by rear naked choke. After the match, he moved to the United States to teach Brazilian jiu-jitsu.

=== World Combat Championships ===
In October 1995, Gracie was called to fight in World Combat Championships, a no holds barred event created by Jon Peters's son Christopher. The event hosted two separate tournaments for strikers and grapplers whose winners would meet at the finals, and Gracie was put on the latter due to his Brazilian jiu-jitsu background.

His first match was against Dutch judoka Ben Spijkers, who had taunted Gracie in the press conference and pranked him on his hotel room the previous night. Spijkers scored the first takedown, but Renzo answered with another, took his back through headbutts and elbow strikes and finally choked him for the win. After the bout, Gracie intentionally stepped on Spijkers's head as he walked away as an act of revenge for the pranking, although Gracie later apologized for it. Gracie next fought striker Phil Benedict, and although he received a hard right punch in the first seconds, he executed a takedown and defeated Benedict by ground and pound from the mount. At the finals, Gracie then faced kickboxer James Warring, winning by neck crank in similar time.

Gracie had originally entered WCC with the idea of fighting Bart Vale, who would compete as well, as Vale had boasted that smaller opponents like Renzo were afraid of facing him. However, Vale would forfeit his place in the tournament after his first match, so the bout didn't happen. Producer Peters had the intention to host a second event where Gracie and Vale would fight in a "superfight" format, but these plans were abandoned.

=== Pentagon Combat ===
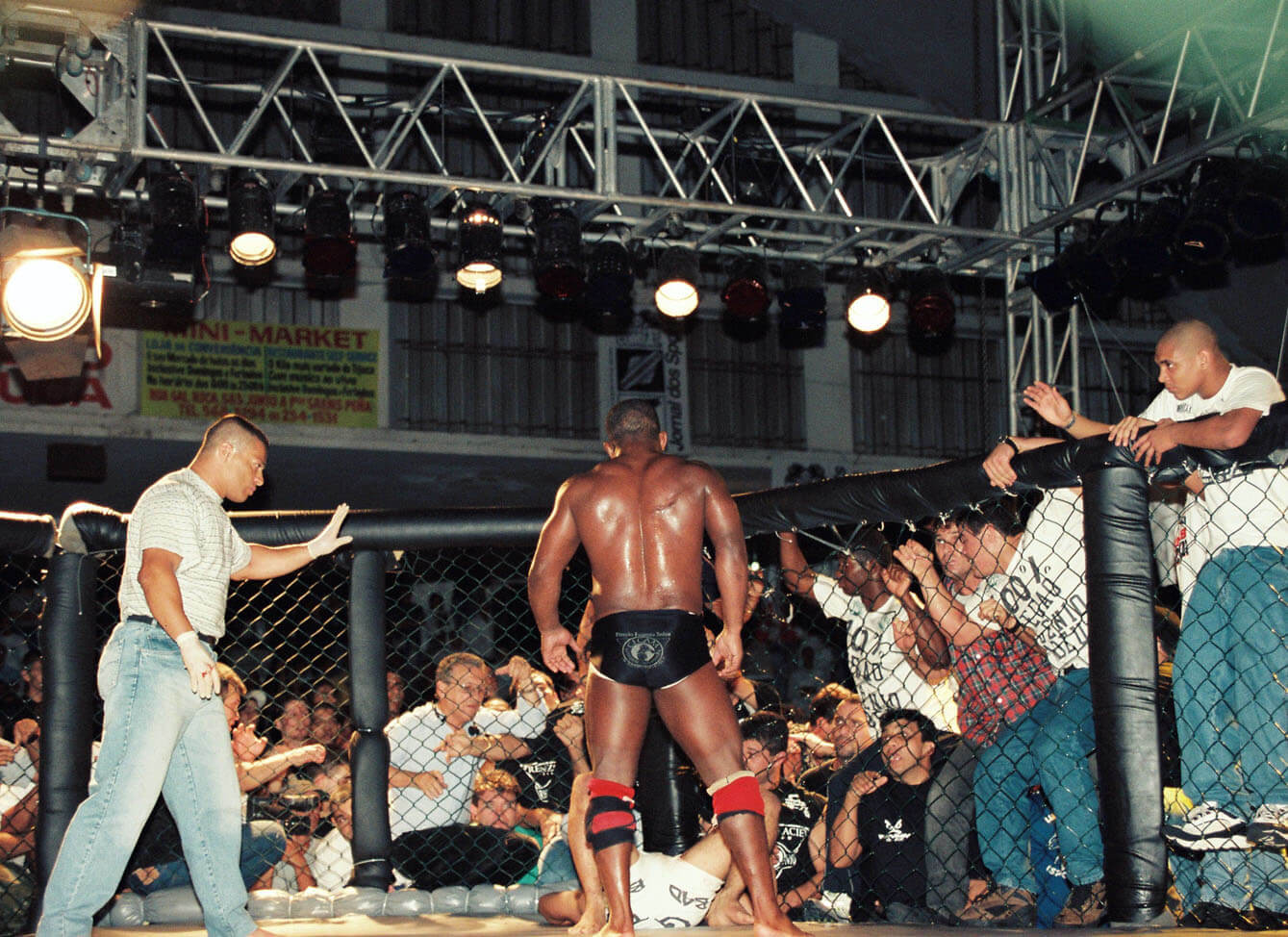
Renzo Gracie (on the ground with white trunks) fights Eugenio Tadeu at Pentagon Combat

On September 22, 1997, Gracie partook in Pentagon Combat, an MMA event founded by future ADCC backer Sheikh Tahnoon bin Zayed. Gracie was pitted against Eugenio Tadeu, a fighter whose style, luta livre, was in a huge rivalry with Brazilian jiu-jitsu at the time, which guaranteed the match was received with heat. Promoters of the event hired little security for the match, and although the luta livre supporters got fewer tickets than their jiu-jitsu homologues, they snuck into the arena earlier in the event. The first minutes of the match were uneventful, with Gracie claiming years later that Tadeu had greased up his body to difficult his grip, but he eventually managed to mount Tadeu. However, Gracie got tired, and Tadeu started to take control of the action.

When the fight became stalled against the cage wall, audience members pushed their way through security staff and grabbed the very cage, screaming insults at the fighters and even attacking them through the netting whenever they came near. Some spectators climbed up the fence while others pulled them down, leading the match to be briefly stopped to clear them out, while Gracie received both punches and kicks by luta livre supporters without the referee noticing. The situation finally exploded when Gracie fought back one of his attackers, causing a massive brawl to erupt among the over 400 spectators. Audience members threw chairs and seats to each other, the lights were turned off, and gunshots were heard. The event caused mixed martial arts to be banned in Rio de Janeiro for ten years.

=== Pride Fighting Championships ===
Gracie debuted in the first event of Pride Fighting Championships, Pride 1, where he was pitted against Japanese judo-based fighter Akira Shoji. The Brazilian dominated the match, at several points threatening Shoji with armbars, rear naked chokes and omoplatas, all while receiving only superficial damage from kicks and knees, but he failed at finishing Shoji, and thus the match went to a draw after thirty minutes.

His first victory in Pride was at the very next event, Pride 2, against judoka and catch wrestler Sanae Kikuta. The match was fought under special rules by Gracie's demand, which included an unlimited number of ten-minute rounds. However, this had the effect to lengthen the match to almost an hour, as both fighters remained largely inactive in the clinch and Renzo's guard. Only in the sixth round, Renzo managed to lock a guillotine choke and submit Kikuta. In 2014, Gracie claimed to have been drugged by PRIDE promoters before the fight to explain his performance.

Gracie returned in Pride 8, where he fought professional wrestler Alexander Otsuka. The latter, who came to the match bandaged due to a pro wrestling match the same day, scored a takedown and passed Gracie's guard for a moment, but the Brazilian regained his defense. Gracie came back with hard upkicks and multiple submission attempts, like a triangle choke and a guillotine choke, being answered with short hammerfists by the Japanese. After the match was restarted, Renzo seemed to secure an armbar from the bottom, only for Otsuka to escape and defend until the end. Even although Gracie next landed a German suplex-like takedown, the match ended with both Otsuka and Gracie pursuing a submission each.

=== Fighting Network Rings ===
Gracie discontinued his appearances in PRIDE to participate in the King of Kings tournament of rival promotion Fighting Network Rings. His first bout in the card was against the promotion's usual low carder Wataru Sakata, who nonetheless had a 20Ibs advantage. Gracie defeated him quickly, taking him down from a kick and submitting him by armbar. After advancing round to meet former kickboxer and UFC Heavyweight Champion Maurice Smith, Gracie achieved the same result, taking him down before submitting him with a judo-style yoko-sankaku-jime/ude-gatame combination.

The Brazilian reached the quarterfinals, where he encountered another Rings shoot wrestler, Kiyoshi Tamura. Gracie started the fight with takedowns and guillotine choke attempts, but Tamura took over with defense and positional control, ending the first round inflicting ground and pound on Renzo. At the second, the wrestler started passing Gracie's guard and capturing his back, to the extent of locking a facedown crucifix and searching for a rear naked choke. Although Gracie managed to escape without being submitted, the unanimous decision was given to Tamura, thus eliminating the Brazilian.

=== Return to Pride ===
Gracie returned to Pride to fight Kazushi Sakuraba, who had been nicknamed "The Gracie Hunter" for his victories against Renzo's relatives Royler and Royce. During the first round, they fought evenly, mainly exchanging strikes and takedown attempts. At the second, the Japanese wrestler took Gracie down, but he was unable to pass his guard despite his many techniques and tricks. The match finally came to its peak when Renzo executed a De la Riva reversal and captured Sakuraba's back against the corner. At that moment, the Japanese got hold of Gracie's arm and spun around with a Kimura lock, dislocating the arm before hitting the mat and prompting the referee to stop the fight. Uncharacteristically for the Gracie side during their rivalry with Sakuraba, Renzo took the mic after the match and declared Sakuraba was the better man. Similarly, years later Gracie called Sakuraba "his hero" and remembered their match as "one of the biggest lessons he learned in his life".

Gracie next fought American wrestler Dan Henderson at Pride 13, now under new rules that allowed knees and kicks to the head of a downed opponent. The resultant match was short, as Henderson used his wrestling superiority to keep the fight on their feet and land punches and knees as per the new ruleset. After one minute, Gracie tried a takedown, but Henderson landed two heavy punches and knocked him out. The American became the first fighter ever to knock out a Gracie. Renzo bounced back with a victory over professional wrestler Michiyoshi Ohara, who resorted to clinch defensively for most of the match.

In 2002, Gracie fought against Shungo Oyama in Pride 21. Oyama taunted Renzo incessantly through the match and imitated Sakuraba's offensive moves, getting some measure of success with it. Renzo became so irritated that he spat on Oyama at the end of the second round. At the third, Gracie looked to re-take the bout, but they just could exchange takedowns and strikes before the match went to the judges, with Oyama winning a unanimous decision. Gracie was unhappy with this, and stated his belief that he had lost the decision only because he spat on Oyama.

His last match for Pride would be in October 2003 against eclectic grappler Carlos Newton. Gracie took him down and captured his back, only for Newton to reverse positions. The two fighters exchanged multiple sweeps and submission attempts in a short time, with Renzo almost locking a kneebar, but Newton ultimately escaped and ended the round hitting ground and pound from side mount. At the second, Renzo received a slamming takedown and a hip throw, so he opted to grab a guillotine choke and pull guard, seeking the finish, yet Newton freed himself and ended the match again with punches from half guard. Newton was given the split decision win, which Gracie disputed.

=== IFL and EliteXC ===
Gracie debuted for International Fight League in September 2006, submitting Pat Miletich in three minutes with a guillotine choke. He would then rematch Carlos Newton in December. The match was noted to resemble oddly their first encounter, as they struggled for position in the first round with Gracie threatening a submission and Newton ending it in side mount. The situation reversed at the second, as Gracie flipped Newton over to side mount, only for Newton to menace him with an ankle lock. At the third and final round, Newton worked to keep the fight standing and made Gracie bleed with some glaring strikes, but the fight ended without a result, and after deliberation, the judges gave it to Gracie. This outcome was immediately met with controversy, with Gracie himself declaring he felt Newton was the winner.

On February 10, 2007, Gracie won a match by disqualification against former UFC Light Heavyweight Champion Frank Shamrock for upstart MMA promotion EliteXC on its debut night Saturday February 10, 2007, on Showtime. Gracie was able to take Frank down and keep the fight on the ground, until Shamrock was disqualified by referee Herb Dean for landing illegal knee strikes to the back of Gracie's head. Shamrock had already been given one warning earlier in the match for illegal strikes to the back of Gracie's head. After the match, Gracie had to be helped out of the ring and back to his dressing room by his team allegedly due to receiving a concussion from the strikes.

=== Ultimate Fighting Championship ===
Returning from a three-year hiatus, Gracie signed a six-fight contract with the UFC in December 2009 and faced former UFC Welterweight Champion Matt Hughes on April 10, 2010, at UFC 112 in Abu Dhabi, United Arab Emirates. Although Gracie fared reasonably well against the American at first, he began to take more and more leg kicks, and by the end of the second round, the fight began to look more and more to Hughes's favor. The third round saw Hughes score with a series of uppercuts and hooks that hurt Gracie, until Hughes eventually Gracie. Renzo became the second Gracie to fall victim to Matt Hughes, the other being his famous cousin Royce Gracie at UFC 60.

=== ONE Championship ===
On June 7, 2018, ONE Championship's president Chatri Sityodtong announced that Renzo Gracie had been enticed from retirement and was scheduled to face Yuki Kondo at One Championship Reign of Kings on July 27, marking Gracie's first fight since his loss to Matt Hughes in 2010. He won the fight via rear-naked choke submission in the second round.

=== Other ventures ===
Renzo formerly coached a team, the New York Pitbulls, for the International Fight League.

Gracie is the head instructor at the Renzo Gracie Academy in midtown Manhattan. Many well-known BJJ and MMA fighters have been trained by Renzo, including BJJ black belts Rodrigo Gracie, former UFC Welterweight Champion Georges St-Pierre, former UFC Welterweight Champion Matt Serra, BJJ World Champion Rafael "Gordinho" Correa, Paul Creighton, Alan Teo, David Branch (fighter), Rafael Natal, former Middleweight King of Pancrase Ricardo Almeida, Sean Alvarez and former UFC Middleweight Champion Chris Weidman.

Gracie has co-written two instructional books on jiu-jitsu; "Brazilian Jiu-Jitsu: Theory and Technique" with his cousin Royler Gracie, and "Mastering Jujitsu" with training partner John Danaher. He has also been the personal jiu-jitsu teacher of Sheikh Mohammed bin Zayed Al Nahyan, Crown Prince of Abu Dhabi, since 1993.

== Submission grappling career ==
On November 22, 2014, Renzo fought Kazushi Sakuraba in a grappling match in Metamoris V. The fight ended in a draw.

== Documentary ==
Gracie is the subject of a 2008 documentary, Renzo Gracie: Legacy.

== Personal life ==
Gracie is a resident of Holmdel Township, New Jersey. He and his wife Cristina have three children. He has eleven brothers and sisters, including Charles Gracie, Flavia Gracie (Kyra Gracie's mother), Carla Gracie (Neiman Gracie's mother), Ralph Gracie and the late Ryan Gracie. In early 2022, Renzo released his biography, written by Brazilian former Special Culture Secretary and theatre director Roberto Alvim.

=== Ambassador of International Tourism ===
A supporter of President Bolsonaro of Brazil, Gracie became in August 2019 Ambassador of International Tourism for Embratur, a branch of the Brazilian Ministry of Tourism. In September 2019, in his new ambassador role, and after President Macron of France called the wildfires an "international crisis," Gracie threatened in a video to choke the French President, calling him a clown and insulting his wife. Gracie declared the Amazon rainforest wildfires to be "false fires".

=== Public image ===
In May 2014, Gracie was arrested at 1OAK in New York City after being charged with gang assault after sending a night club bouncer to the hospital. Gracie maintained that he took down the bouncer and mounted him, but did not punch him. Gracie's cousin, Igor was arrested together with 5 other people in the incident.

In 2017 Gracie took part in a BJJ seminar in Chechnya at a gym owned by dictator Ramzan Kadyrov, Gracie appeared during that time on local TV to promote Kadyrov's government.

In September 2022, footage emerged of Gracie being involved in an altercation with a stranger in the New York City Subway. Gracie alleged that the man had approached him making racist remarks.

== Instructor lineage ==
Mitsuyo Maeda → Carlos Gracie Sr. → Helio Gracie → Rolls Gracie → Carlos Gracie Jr. → Renzo Gracie

== Championships and accomplishments ==
=== Submission grappling ===
- ADCC Submission Fighting World champion (1998 and 2000)

=== Brazilian jiu-jitsu ===
- Copa Atlântico Sul Champion (1988, 1989, 1990, 1991, 1994)

=== Mixed martial arts ===
- World Combat Championships
  - World Combat Championships 1 tournament winner

== Mixed martial arts record ==
Professional record breakdown
23 matches	14 wins	7 losses
By knockout	2	2
By submission	8	1
By decision	3	4
By disqualification	1	0
Draws	1	
No contests	1	

Res.	Record	Opponent	Method	Event	Date	Round	Time	Location	Notes
Win	14–7–1 (1)	Yuki Kondo	Submission (rear-naked choke)	ONE: Reign of Kings	July 27, 2018	2	1:40	Pasay, Philippines	
Loss	13–7–1 (1)	Matt Hughes	TKO (punches)	UFC 112	April 10, 2010	3	4:40	Abu Dhabi, United Arab Emirates	
Win	13–6–1 (1)	Frank Shamrock	DQ (knees to downed opponent)	EliteXC: Destiny	February 10, 2007	2	2:00	Southaven, Mississippi, United States	
Win	12–6–1 (1)	Carlos Newton	Decision (split)	IFL: World Team Championships	December 29, 2006	3	4:00	Uncasville, Connecticut, United States	
Win	11–6–1 (1)	Pat Miletich	Submission (guillotine choke)	IFL: Gracie vs. Miletich	September 23, 2006	1	3:37	Moline, Illinois, United States	
Loss	10–6–1 (1)	B.J. Penn	Decision (unanimous)	K-1 World Grand Prix 2005 in Hawaii	July 29, 2005	3	5:00	Honolulu, Hawaii, United States	
Loss	10–5–1 (1)	Carlos Newton	Decision (split)	Pride Bushido 1	October 5, 2003	2	5:00	Saitama, Japan	
Loss	10–4–1 (1)	Shungo Oyama	Decision (unanimous)	Pride 21	June 23, 2002	3	5:00	Saitama, Japan	
Win	10–3–1 (1)	Michiyoshi Ohara	Decision (unanimous)	Pride 17	November 3, 2001	3	5:00	Tokyo, Japan	
Loss	9–3–1 (1)	Dan Henderson	KO (punch)	Pride 13 - Collision Course	March 25, 2001	1	1:40	Saitama, Japan	
Loss	9–2–1 (1)	Kazushi Sakuraba	Technical Submission (kimura)	Pride 10 - Return of the Warriors	August 27, 2000	2	9:43	Saitama, Japan	
Loss	9–1–1 (1)	Kiyoshi Tamura	Decision (unanimous)	Rings: King of Kings 1999 Final	February 26, 2000	2	5:00	Tokyo, Japan	
Win	9–0–1 (1)	Maurice Smith	Submission (straight armbar)	Rings: King of Kings 1999 Block B	December 22, 1999	1	0:50	Osaka, Japan	
Win	8–0–1 (1)	Wataru Sakata	Submission (armbar)	Rings: King of Kings 1999 Block B	December 22, 1999	1	1:25	Osaka, Japan	
Win	7–0–1 (1)	Alexander Otsuka	Decision (unanimous)	Pride 8	November 21, 1999	2	10:00	Tokyo, Japan	
Win	6–0–1 (1)	Sanae Kikuta	Submission (guillotine choke)	Pride 2	March 15, 1998	6	0:43	Yokohama, Japan	
Draw	5–0–1 (1)	Akira Shoji	Draw (time limit)	Pride 1	October 11, 1997	3	10:00	Tokyo, Japan	
NC	5–0 (1)	Eugenio Tadeu	No contest (fans rioted)	Pentagon Combat	September 27, 1997	1	14:45	Rio de Janeiro, Brazil	
Win	5–0	Oleg Taktarov	KO (upkick)	Martial Arts Reality Superfighting	November 22, 1996	1	1:02	Birmingham, Alabama, United States	
Win	4–0	James Warring	Submission (choke)	WCC 1: First Strike	October 17, 1995	1	2:47	Charlotte, North Carolina, United States	
Win	3–0	Phil Benedict	TKO (submission to strikes)	WCC 1: First Strike	October 17, 1995	1	2:08	Charlotte, North Carolina, United States	
Win	2–0	Ben Spijkers	Submission (choke)	WCC 1: First Strike	October 17, 1995	1	2:38	Charlotte, North Carolina, United States	
Win	1–0	Luiz Augusto Alvareda	Submission (rear-naked choke)	Desafio: Gracie Vale Tudo	January 1, 1992	1	7:03	Rio de Janeiro, Brazil	

== Grappling record ==
19 Matches, 11 Wins (3 Submissions), 7 Losses, 1 Draw
Result	Rec.	Opponent	Method	Event	Division	Date	Location
Draw	11–7–1	(Japan) Kazushi Sakuraba	Draw	Metamoris V	Superfight	November 22, 2014	(United States) Los Angeles, CA
Loss	11–7	(Brazil) Mario Sperry	Points	ADCC 2011	Superfight	September 25, 2011	(United Kingdom) Nottingham
Loss	11–6	(United States) Mike Fowler	Points	ADCC 2007	–77 kg	May 4, 2007	(United States) Trenton, NJ
Loss	11–5	(Brazil) Pablo Popovitch	Points	ADCC 2005	–77 kg	2005	(United States) Long Beach, CA
Loss	11–4	(Brazil) Marcelo García	Points	ADCC 2003	–77 kg	May 17, 2003	(Brazil) São Paulo
Win	11–3	(Australia) George Sotiropoulos	Points	ADCC 2003	–77 kg	May 17, 2003	(Brazil) São Paulo
Loss	10–3	(Australia) Cris Brown	Advantage	ADCC 2001	–88 kg	2001	(United Arab Emirates) Abu Dhabi
Win	10–2	(Brazil) Jean Jacques Machado	Advantage	ADCC 2000	–77 kg	2000	(United Arab Emirates) Abu Dhabi
Win	9–2	(Brazil) Marcio Feitosa	Submission (guillotine choke)	ADCC 2000	–77 kg	2000	(United Arab Emirates) Abu Dhabi
Win	8–2	(Brazil) Israel Albuquerque	Points	ADCC 2000	–77 kg	2000	(United Arab Emirates) Abu Dhabi
Win	7–2	(United States) Dennis Hallman	Points	ADCC 2000	–77 kg	2000	(United Arab Emirates) Abu Dhabi
Loss	6–2	(Japan) Egan Inoue	Points	ADCC 1999	–99 kg	1999	(United Arab Emirates) Abu Dhabi
Win	6–1	(China) Fan Yi	Submission (verbal)	ADCC 1999	–99 kg	1999	(United Arab Emirates) Abu Dhabi
Win	5–1	(Brazil) Luis Brito	Submission (guillotine choke)	ADCC 1998	–77 kg	1998	(United Arab Emirates) Abu Dhabi
Win	4–1	(Brazil) Fabiano Iha	Points	ADCC 1998	–77 kg	1998	(United Arab Emirates) Abu Dhabi
Win	3–1	(Brazil) Rodrigo Medeiros	Points	ADCC 1998	–77 kg	1998	(United Arab Emirates) Abu Dhabi
Win	2–1	(United States) Frank Trigg	Decision	ADCC 1998	–77 kg	1998	(United Arab Emirates) Abu Dhabi
Loss	1–1	(Brazil) Wallid Ismail	decision	Desafio WxR	Superfight	1993	(Brazil) Rio de Janeiro
Win	1–0	(Brazil) Ricardo de la Riva	Advantage	Campeonato Brasileiro	Superfight	1993	(Brazil) Rio de Janeiro

== See also ==
- List of ONE Championship alumni
