= B.J. Penn =

American mixed martial arts fighter

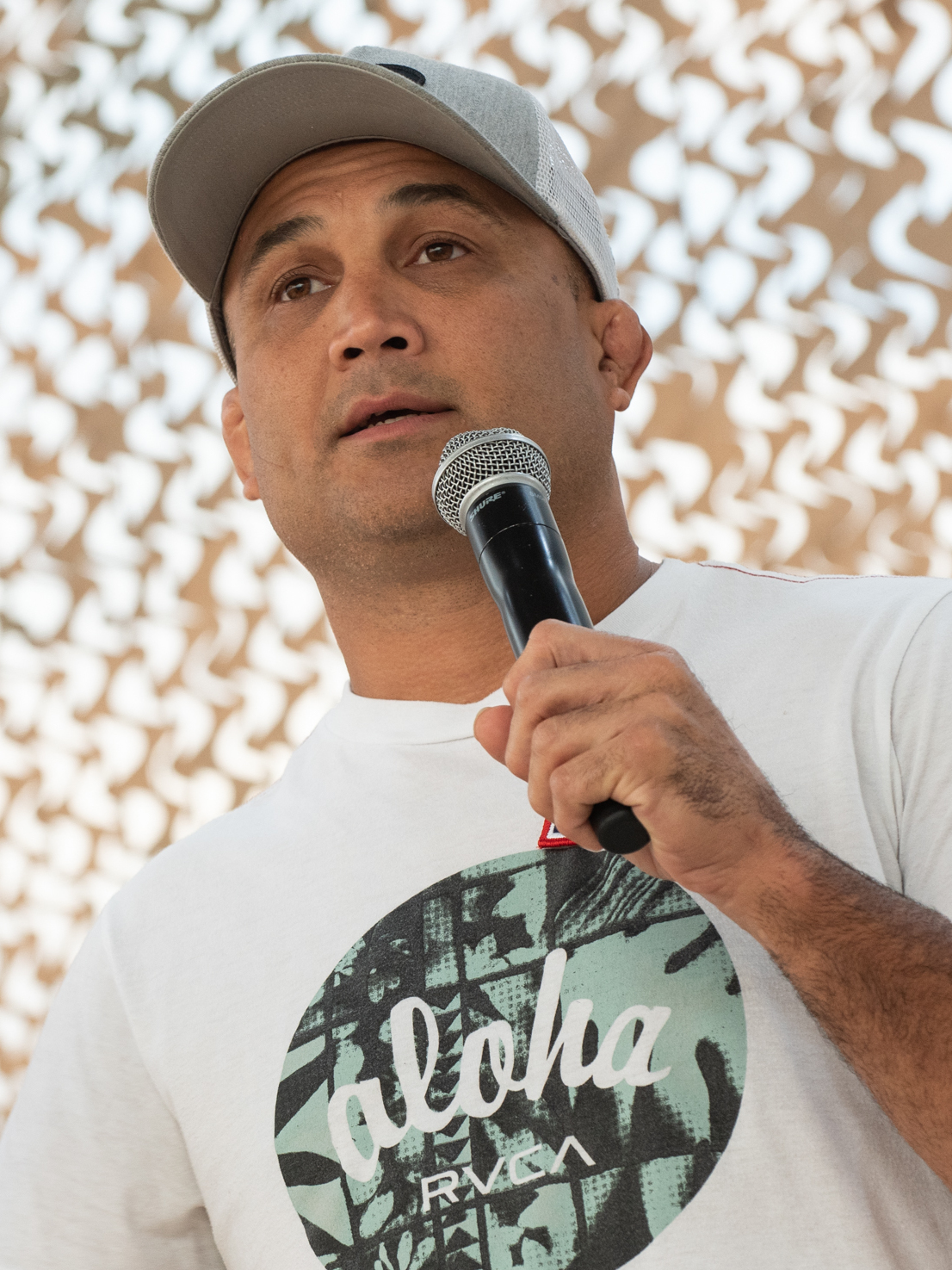
- Penn in 2019
- Born: Jay Dee Penn III; December 13, 1978 (age 47); Kailua, Hawaii, U.S.
- Other names: The Prodigy
- Height: 5 ft 9 in (175 cm)
- Weight: 145 lb (66 kg; 10 st 5 lb)
- Division: Featherweight (2014–2017); Lightweight (2001–2003, 2007–2010, 2018-2019); Welterweight (2004, 2006, 2010–2012); Middleweight (2004–2005); Openweight (2005)
- Reach: 70 in (178 cm)
- Style: Brazilian Jiu-Jitsu
- Team: B.J. Penn's MMA
- Trainer: Jason Parillo
- Rank: 5th degree black belt in BJJ (Note: under André Pederneiras)
- Years active: 2001–2014, 2017–2019

Mixed martial arts record
- Total: 32
- Wins: 16
- By knockout: 7
- By submission: 6
- By decision: 3
- Losses: 14
- By knockout: 4
- By submission: 1
- By decision: 9
- Draws: 2

Other information
- Notable school: Hilo High School
- Website: bjpenn.com
- Mixed martial arts record from Sherdog

Jay Dee "B.J." Penn III (born December 13, 1978) is an American former professional mixed martial artist and 5th degree black belt Brazilian jiu-jitsu (BJJ) practitioner. A former UFC Lightweight Champion and UFC Welterweight Champion, he is the second of eleven fighters in UFC history to win titles in multiple weight classes. Prior to his MMA career, Penn was known as the first non-Brazilian to win the World Jiu-Jitsu Championship at black belt level. In mixed martial arts, Penn has competed in the Ultimate Fighting Championship (UFC) and in K-1 in the Featherweight, Lightweight, Welterweight, Middleweight, and Heavyweight/Openweight divisions. Penn fought to a draw against Caol Uno in the UFC 41 Lightweight Tournament. Through his tenures as champion, Penn unofficially unified the UFC Lightweight Championship (against Sean Sherk) and broke the all-time lightweight title defense record. In 2015, Penn was made the inaugural inductee into the Modern-era wing of the UFC Hall of Fame.

Penn was considered one of the top pound-for-pound mixed martial artists in the world early in his career and holds victories over opponents such as Din Thomas, Caol Uno, Paul Creighton, and Matt Serra. Penn won the Rumble on the Rock Lightweight Championship in K-1. He submitted long-reigning then-champion Matt Hughes to capture the UFC Welterweight Championship. Following a period in which Penn competed exclusively for K-1, he returned to the UFC and won the UFC Lightweight Championship. He made a record three subsequent title defenses before losing his title to Frankie Edgar.

Penn is regarded as one of the best competitors in the UFC's history. UFC President, Dana White, credits Penn with bringing the lower weight divisions into the mainstream of mixed martial arts; he describes Penn as "the first crossover pay-per-view star for the Ultimate Fighting Championship's lighter weight divisions", as well as saying that "[through his] accomplishments, B.J. Penn built the 155-pound division".

Penn ran for governor of Hawaii in the 2022 Hawaii gubernatorial election but was eliminated in the Republican Party primary.

In 2025, Penn claimed in court and on social media that close relatives, including his mother, had been murdered and replaced by impostors. His mother, Lorraine Shin, was granted a restraining order and stated she believed Penn was experiencing Capgras syndrome, a psychiatric delusional disorder. The same year, Penn had been arrested for assault on at least six occasions.

== Early life and education ==
Penn was born in Kailua, Hawaii to Lorraine (née Shin) and Jay Dee Penn. He is of Native Hawaiian and Korean descent through his mother, and of English and Irish descent through his father. At the age of 17, Penn began training in Brazilian Jiu-Jitsu after being introduced to it by his neighbor, Tom Callos. Callos had put up fliers in local gyms looking for people to train with, and Penn's father had called Callos and said his sons were interested. Callos then taught Penn and his brothers what he knew. Shortly thereafter, Penn moved to San Jose, California, to begin training at the Ralph Gracie BJJ academy with Dave Camarillo, with whom he lived and became close friends. It was during his time in San Jose that he decided to pursue a martial arts career.

== Brazilian jiu-jitsu ==
In 1997 Penn began training Brazilian Jiu-Jitsu under Ralph Gracie, eventually earning his purple belt from Gracie. At that point he moved to Nova União, where he was eventually awarded his black belt in 2000 by André Pederneiras. A few weeks later, he became the first non-Brazilian to win in the black-belt division of the World Jiu-Jitsu Championship held in Rio de Janeiro, Brazil. While Penn's most well-known and prestigious achievement was placing first in the black belt division in the 2000 world championships, he had success at the Mundials in previous years. In 1999, at the age of 20, Penn finished 3rd, earning himself a bronze medal in the brown belt division, losing only to Fernando "Tererê" Augusto, and in 1998, earned a silver medal, placing 2nd in the blue belt division. Penn is thought to have earned the fastest legitimate black belt of all active Brazilian Jiu-Jitsu practitioners.

== Mixed martial arts career ==
=== Ultimate Fighting Championship ===
Penn's accomplishments in the World Jiu-Jitsu Championship caught the attention of the Ultimate Fighting Championship, which convinced him to switch to mixed martial arts. Penn made his mixed martial arts debut with the company on May 24, 2001, with a win over Joey Gilbert at UFC 31. He then demonstrated strong striking skills, knocking out lightweights Din Thomas and Caol Uno before suffering a decision loss in a championship fight against UFC Lightweight Champion, Jens Pulver. In 2003, after Pulver left the UFC and relinquished his title, a tournament to crown a new champion flopped when Penn fought Uno to a draw in the finals at UFC 41, a failure which caused the UFC to later suspend its lightweight division. Penn bounced back later in the year with a victory over future PRIDE Lightweight Champion Takanori Gomi to earn his first MMA championship, the Rumble on the Rock Lightweight Championship, in K-1 Fighting Network's Rumble on the Rock, an MMA organization promoted by Penn's brother, and Fighting and Entertainment Group (FEG), the parent company of the largest kickboxing organization, K-1.

Penn received his first UFC Championship in 2004 at UFC 46. Penn jumped up in weight classes to challenge the five-time defending UFC Welterweight Champion Matt Hughes to fill a title contention slot in a division where Hughes had already defeated all the available opposition. Heavily favored to win, Hughes lost the fight four minutes into the first round by rear naked choke after giving up his back with only 23 seconds left in the round, in a bout which remains as one of the biggest upsets, as well as one of the greatest submission victories in mixed martial arts history.

=== Fighting and Entertainment Group ===
Penn signed to fight for the Japanese Fighting and Entertainment Group's (FEG) K-1 promotion citing a lack of challenging fights left for him in the UFC. The UFC promptly stripped him of the welterweight title, claiming Penn breached his contract and that the signing constituted as him refusing to defend his title. Penn filed a suit against the UFC and publicized his side of the conflict, claiming his UFC contract had already expired. Penn filed a motion to stop the UFC from awarding a new welterweight title, but that motion was denied.

In his second fight for FEG, Penn fought again at welterweight and defeated Duane Ludwig at the 2004 K-1 MMA Romanex show in under five minutes by arm triangle choke. Following the Ludwig fight, Penn moved up in weight class to face the undefeated Rodrigo Gracie at middleweight. Penn won by decision, extending his winning streak to four fights. On March 26, 2005, at the inaugural event of FEG's new MMA promotion Hero's, Penn faced future UFC Light Heavyweight Champion Lyoto Machida, losing by unanimous decision at K-1 Hero's 1. The fight happened at an open weight class with Penn weighing in at 86.5 kilograms (191 lb) and Machida weighing in at 102 kilograms (225 lb). Later that year at K-1 World Grand Prix Hawaii, Penn returned to middleweight to face Pride Fighting Championship veteran Renzo Gracie, which he won by unanimous decision.

=== Return to the UFC ===
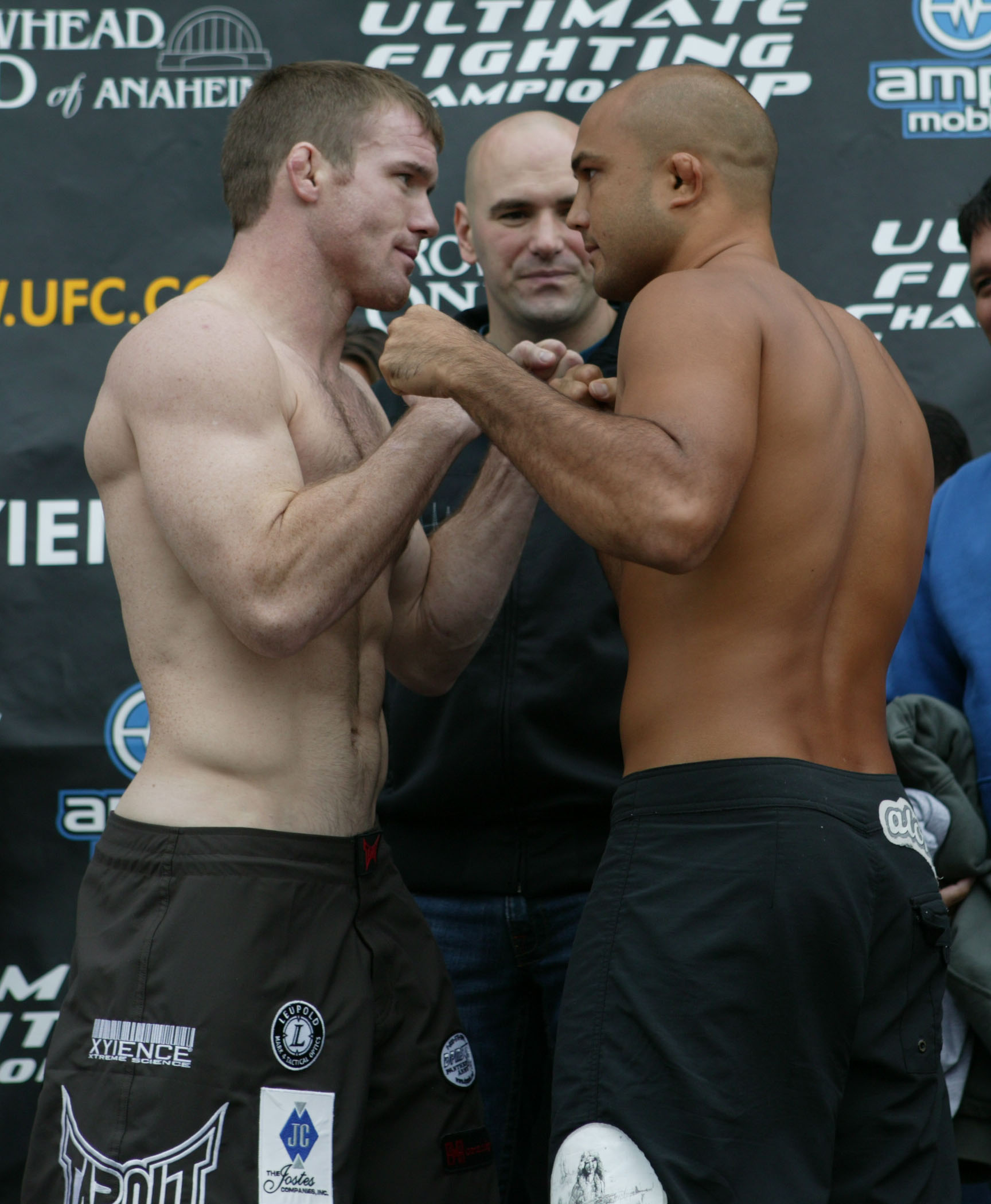
Hughes and Penn before their rematch at UFC 63: Hughes vs. Penn

In early 2006 at UFC 56, UFC president Dana White announced that Penn and the UFC had agreed to a settlement and Penn was to return as a top welterweight contender. Penn re-debuted on March 4 at UFC 58, losing to Georges St-Pierre by split decision in a fight that determined the number one welterweight contender. Although St. Pierre was declared the winner after a three-round decision, some believed that Penn had done enough to earn himself the victory, causing noticeably more damage throughout the fight, as Joe Rogan described St-Pierre's face being "a bloody mess" while B.J. Penn "barely having a scratch on him." Despite having lost the bout, Penn's performance against Georges St-Pierre, is considered to be one of the best put forth against the future UFC Champion.

After new top contender St. Pierre injured himself during training, the UFC announced that Penn would replace St. Pierre in an upcoming title fight, setting up a highly anticipated rematch with Hughes at UFC 63 on September 23, 2006. In the bout, Penn controlled the first two rounds, but sustained a rib injury during the scramble to take Hughes' back in round two. He was visibly different in the third round, appearing exhausted and missing punches he was landing earlier. Hughes was able to take Penn to the mat, and in side control crucifix position rained punches on Penn's head until referee "Big" John McCarthy stopped the fight at 3:53 of the third round, making this the first time that Penn had been stopped in a fight. This fight earned him a Fight of the Night award. In an interview found on Penn's personal website, Penn stated that by round three he could hardly breathe and had no "mobility in his core." Despite the injury, Penn congratulated Hughes, calling him a great fighter and saying he deserved the victory.

Penn was a coach for The Ultimate Fighter 5, which debuted on April 5, 2007. Penn lead a team of eight lightweight fighters, and fought a rematch against Jens Pulver at The Ultimate Fighter 5#The Ultimate Fighter 5 Finale on June 23, 2007. He won with a rear naked choke in the second round after controlling Pulver from the mount and then taking Pulver's back. Although he held the choke for a moment after Pulver tapped out, the two then embraced, with both later saying they no longer held any ill will against each other.

On July 7, 2007, during the post-fight press conference of UFC 73, UFC president Dana White announced that Penn would stay at lightweight to fight current UFC Lightweight Champion Sean Sherk. However, Sean Sherk subsequently was suspended by the California State Athletic Commission, and the status of the possible title fight was left in limbo as he pursued his appeals. With Sherk's title status still in limbo after months of hearings, the UFC scheduled Penn to fight Joe Stevenson at UFC 80 on January 19, 2008, for an interim lightweight title. The subsequent final decision by the California State Athletic Commission, which did not overturn Sherk's suspension, led to the title being stripped from Sherk and the Penn-Stevenson fight being upgraded to a full title bout, with the winner facing Sherk in their first defense.

==== Lightweight Championship ====
Penn knocked Stevenson down seconds into the first round with a right uppercut, then took Stevenson down, delivering a well placed elbow from the top position that inflicted a serious cut near Stevenson's hairline. In the second round, Stevenson fought more aggressively but was still unable to threaten Penn. Penn worked to back mount and defeated him by rear naked choke at 4:02 of the second round to win the Lightweight Championship. He celebrated the win by licking Joe Stevenson's blood off of his gloves. The win for Penn was awarded Beatdown of the Year by Sherdog for 2008. This fight also earned him a $35,000 Submission of the Night award. With this win, Penn became the second man (after Randy Couture) to win UFC titles in two different weight classes.

On May 24, 2008, at UFC 84 at the MGM Grand Garden Arena in Las Vegas, Nevada, Penn fought former champion Sean Sherk in his first title defense bout. The fight was billed by color commentator Mike Goldberg as the "biggest fight in the history of the UFC lightweight division". Sherk attempted to take Penn down only once (in the first round), instead the fighters traded punches and leg kicks for the remainder of the fight. Penn landed jabs several times, using his reach advantage over Sherk. In the closing seconds of the third round, Penn threw a punch and a hook that backed Sherk into the cage. Sherk then ducked under another punch – possibly to shoot for a takedown – when he was hit in the head by a flush flying left knee from Penn. Sherk went down and Penn continued with strikes, but the round ended before the referee stopped the fight. However, Sherk was unable to continue and Penn was declared the victor by TKO (strikes). After the fight, in response a question by Joe Rogan about his future, Penn asked the crowd if they wanted to see him fight Georges St-Pierre and was answered with a loud ovation. Later, Penn told Fighters Club TV that he would face the winner of the UFC 87 Welterweight title fight between Georges St-Pierre and Jon Fitch, which St-Pierre ended up winning by unanimous decision. St-Pierre's victory led to the scheduling of B.J.'s next fight as a Welterweight Championship fight.

==== Welterweight title shot ====
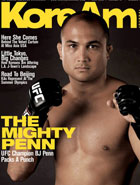
Penn appearing on the cover of the July 2008 issue of KoreAm

Penn challenged Georges St-Pierre for St-Pierre's welterweight title on January 31, 2009, the night before the Super Bowl. The date led UFC 94 to be billed as the "UFC Super Bowl Weekend," and it was anticipated to be the biggest UFC pay-per-view event ever. Before the fight with St-Pierre, Penn made a controversial comment that he was going to try to kill St-Pierre in the ring, but he later explained that he was speaking figuratively.

The first round of the fight was somewhat even, with Penn exercising elusive head movement, fast hands and good take-down defense, thwarting all of St-Pierre's take-down attempts while both exchanged punches. In the ensuing three rounds, however, Penn turned out a lackluster performance. St-Pierre scored his first take-down of the night midway through the second round, and by the end of the round Penn was visibly tired. At the start of round three, St-Pierre landed a "superman punch" that bloodied Penn's nose and shortly took Penn down again. From that point on, St-Pierre took Penn down almost at will, repeatedly passed Penn's renowned guard, and persistently punished the Hawaiian with a ground-and-pound attack. Penn later admitted that he could not recall anything that happened during the 3rd and 4th rounds because "I was probably borderline knocked out or something." At the end of the fourth round, after more of St-Pierre's ground-and-pound onslaught, and upon B.J.'s command, Penn's brother requested that the referee stop the fight. After the fight, Penn failed to attend the post-fight press conference due to having stayed in the hospital.

A controversy arose during the fight as St-Pierre's corner-men were spotted rubbing St-Pierre's back immediately after applying Vaseline to his face. Members of the Nevada State Athletic Commission (NSAC) came into the octagon and wiped St-Pierre's torso down. Penn later sent a formal request to the NSAC, asking them to investigate. Despite all of the complaints by the Penn camp, the NSAC ruled that there was no infraction. This incident was famously coined by Penn fans as the "Greasegate" and remains as one of the biggest controversial moments in UFC history.

I think he absolutely, positively knew that he was rubbing grease on him. Do I think Georges was trying to cheat? Absolutely not at all. But that corner man was rubbing grease on him.

— Dana White, post fight at UFC 94.

The rules of the UFC were modified so that only the official "cut men" would be allowed to have or apply Vaseline to the fighters. The procedures governing the transition from the fighters walk-in to the cage and while in the cage were also changed. Previously, fighters would walk up next to the cage, see the cut man who would apply Vaseline, be checked by the referee, and then have an opportunity to speak with or hug their coaches or cornermen before entering the cage. To prevent an opportunity for the fighters to have Vaseline applied illicitly, fighters now must first part from any company, have Vaseline applied by the cut man, be checked by the referee, and then go directly to the cage. Finally, no cornermen will be allowed to have Vaseline in the cage between rounds. In this way, the fighter's contact with Vaseline is fully controlled by the cut men and referee, who work independently of the UFC.

UFC President Dana White said that the incident had no effect on the outcome of the fight although he wished the incident had not happened. Penn did, after all, quit after the fourth round. In his first post-fight interview Penn spoke of his belief that if St-Pierre were found to have been "greased" he would lose all respect for him, while admitting that "[I] definitely got my butt kicked." Penn claims that before the match he warned the NSAC that St-Pierre might use grease intentionally. St-Pierre responded to the allegations by offering to fight a rematch against Penn. Penn went on record as accepting the offer for a re-match. Following his informal acceptance of a proposed second rematch, Penn filed a formal complaint with Nevada State Athletic Commission seeking to prevent St-Pierre from fighting by suspending St-Pierre's fighter's license. In addition, Penn unsuccessfully requested the suspension of St-Pierre's cornermen, Greg Jackson and Phil Nurse, a fine of $250,000, and overturning the result of the fight to a no-contest.

==== Return as Lightweight Champion ====
Penn began negotiations to fight Kenny Florian in the summer of 2009. The Florian-Penn title fight was scheduled for UFC 99, but B.J. Penn requested more time off after his fight with GSP. He defended his title against Florian on August 8, 2009, at UFC 101. This fight earned him a $60,000 Submission of the Night award. Penn looked noticeably in better physical shape than his previous outings at 155 lbs and negated any sort of takedown offense from Florian the entire match despite his opponent's persistence in grappling and engaging the clinch.

On his feet, Penn avoided virtually any damage, constantly stuffing or evading any attempts of a left high kick, punches, or elbows from Florian when the two departed from the clinch. In a measured performance, Penn preferred to pace himself in his standup, occasionally showing explosive bursts of striking up until the fourth round, where he executed a powerful takedown and quickly assumed the half guard position, punishing the contender with elbows until gaining the full mount, where punches followed to continue the ground and pound assault from the BJJ specialist.

A scramble ensued, where Florian gave up his back twice but was unable to escape Penn's mount, the second time Penn took his opponent's back, he looked to trap Florian's arm with one of his legs, but was unable to do so, instead striking the liver of Florian with his heel, which eventually led Penn to secure a rear naked choke at 3:45 of the fourth round to defend his lightweight championship title.

Penn fought Diego Sanchez for the UFC Lightweight Championship on December 12, 2009, at UFC 107. Penn negated virtually any offense from the contender, exercising good footwork and elusive head movement whilst remaining flawless in his takedown defense on 27 attempts from Sanchez. He stalked his opponent for large periods of the match and stunned Sanchez early, dropping him; following up with multiple clean shots, which Sanchez showed good durability in weathering. Penn, showing good conditioning for the duration of the bout, continued to stuff all takedowns, punches and left high kicks from Sanchez and dominated with aggressive bursts of striking throughout. He hurt Sanchez several times, until finally rocking him with a flurry in the final round, swarming to finish the combo with a right high kick. The kick opened up a huge cut on Sanchez's forehead above his left eye, causing the fight to be halted on doctor's advice at 2:47 of the fifth round with a TKO. The victory marked only the second fight in UFC history to end in the fifth round, and also earned Penn the distinction of being the only man to have stopped Sanchez.

That right there, ladies and gentlemen, is the greatest lightweight, in the history of the sport!

— Joe Rogan, post fight at UFC 107.

The performance marked the third time Penn had successfully finished a fight in defending his UFC Lightweight Championship, setting a new record of lightweight title defenses, by breaking the previous record of two defenses by Jens Pulver. Later during the post-fight press conference UFC President Dana White told the media he was proud of Penn's willingness to take MMA more seriously in his training when earlier he felt Penn had coasted through the UFC solely on natural talent.

==== Losing the title ====
Penn's next defense was on April 10, 2010, at UFC 112 against Frankie Edgar. Despite being an overwhelming favorite coming into the fight, Penn lost the closely contested bout by unanimous decision; breaking his eight-year undefeated streak in the lightweight division. 8 of 9 media outlets scored the bout in favor of Penn. After the fight, Penn congratulated Edgar on winning the belt. Despite this, the results garnered much criticism as many disagreed with the judges decision after the five round fight, having believed that Penn had done enough to earn himself the victory. Due to the controversy surrounding the outcome, an immediate rematch with Edgar was scheduled as his first title defense.

BJ is the greatest lightweight ever. I can just hope to be half the champion he was.

— Frankie Edgar, post fight at UFC 112.

Penn fought Edgar in a rematch at UFC 118. Edgar was able to negate his ground offense and control the fight with good movement and striking combinations. All three judges scored the fight 50–45 for Edgar.

==== Return to welterweight and hiatus ====
Penn fought Matt Hughes at UFC 123 in a rubber match after their previous two fights at UFC 46 and UFC 63. Penn defeated Hughes in 21 seconds of the first round by knockout after flooring Hughes with a right hand and following with additional strikes on the mat. Penn earned knockout of the night honors for his performance. This fight earned him a $80,000 Knockout of the Night award.

You're my idol -- Matt Hughes, you're my idol, you will always be my idol, thank you.

— B.J. Penn, post fight at UFC 123.

Following the UFC 123 post-fight press conference, UFC president Dana White said that Penn would fight top welterweight contender Jon Fitch at UFC 127 in Australia. Penn trained with Matt Hughes and Floyd Mayweather Sr. in preparation for the fight. Penn surprised Fitch by taking him to the ground instead of using his stand up skills. The fight ended in a draw, snapping Fitch's five fight UFC win streak, and Penn stated that he would gladly have a rematch in the future. UFC matchmaker Joe Silva stated that neither the fans nor the UFC are interested in a Penn-Fitch rematch.

Penn was expected to face Carlos Condit on October 29, 2011, at UFC 137. B.J. Penn relocated his camp to Southern California in an effort to prepare for the bout. Penn was joined in California by former UFC middleweight and Ultimate Fighter winner Kendall Grove and B.J.'s brother Reagan Penn, as they both prepared for their August 27 fights on the ProElite show in Hawaii. However, on September 7, Condit was pulled from the bout and replaced Nick Diaz in the main event against Georges St-Pierre. Dana White stated that Penn will fight Nick Diaz in the main event at UFC 137 after GSP pulled out due to knee injury. Penn lost via unanimous decision after winning the first round by crisp boxing as well as mixing in a takedown against the former Strikeforce Welterweight Champion, but was unable to mount any significant offense or defense against Diaz's stand-up attack in the remaining two rounds. This fight earned him a $75,000 Fight of the Night award.

Immediately following the loss to Diaz, Penn announced his plans to retire, saying into the microphone, "Joe, this was probably the last time you'll see me in here. I can't keep performing at the top level. That's it Joe. I got a daughter and another daughter on the way, I don't want to go home looking like this. I'm done." On November 1, Penn posted a message to fans on his website indicating that he plans to take some time off, but the retirement decision is not yet official. He said, "I want to thank all the fans for their love and support. I have decided to take some time off to enjoy life, train and teach. I will keep you guys posted with what’s next." A few months afterwards, B.J. tweeted angrily at both Jon Fitch and Nick Diaz, causing many to believe that Penn would be returning from his retirement within the near future. His manager has stated that the old B.J. is back and could be returning to MMA. In April 2012 UFC president Dana White said B.J. Penn turned down a fight with the reigning Strikeforce Lightweight Champion, Gilbert Melendez, and that Penn wants to continue at 170 pounds "whenever he is ready". White also said he feels that B.J. Penn deserves to be in the UFC Hall of Fame, stating that he was a pioneer for the lightweight division, at a time when many believed that there couldn't be any stars at 155 pounds.

Several months after declaring his retirement from mixed martial arts, B.J. Penn announced that he would be returning to the octagon after repeated challenges made by welterweight prospect Rory MacDonald; stating, "Rory, I accept your challenge!". Initially, Penn was expected to face Rory MacDonald on September 22, 2012, at UFC 152. However, MacDonald pulled out of the bout after sustaining a cut to the forehead while training. Penn vs. MacDonald eventually took place on December 8, 2012, at UFC on Fox 5. Penn lost the fight via unanimous decision. After the fight Dana White stated that he'd like to see B.J. Penn retire from mixed martial arts, although Penn has hinted a desire to return to the UFC's lightweight division. Following months of silence regarding his future, Penn spoke with Ariel Helwani in an interview for UFC on Fox, where he admitted that he was still undecided on his future, telling him that "at this moment, my guess is probably a little better than yours, but I don't know, I'm enjoying what I'm doing."

==== Move to featherweight and losing streak ====
An announcement was made on UFC Tonight in September 2013 that Penn will return from his hiatus and move to the Featherweight division to coach against rival, Frankie Edgar for the 19th season of The Ultimate Fighter. This move marked Penn's second appearance serving as a head coach for The Ultimate Fighter, his first being The Ultimate Fighter 5, opposite Jens Pulver. The season aired on Fox Sports 1 and featured middleweight and light heavyweight contestants. The two coaches faced each other for the third time on July 6, 2014, at The Ultimate Fighter 19 Finale.

Penn returned to Nova União under coach André Pederneiras (who promoted Penn to black belt in Brazilian Jiu-Jitsu in 1999) in preparation for his fight camp against Edgar; training alongside former UFC Bantamweight Champion Renan Barão and UFC Featherweight Champion José Aldo. Later in the camp, he also enlisted former UFC Bantamweight Champion Dominick Cruz in Hilo, Hawaii for his preparation. Penn lost the one sided bout by TKO in the third round. At the conclusion of the bout, Penn announced his intentions to retire again during the event's post-fight press conference.

He’s one of the best 155-pounders of all time. He built that weight class and he was responsible for helping build the UFC. That’s his legacy.

— Dana White, during the post-fight press conference at The Ultimate Fighter 19 Finale.

In January 2016, after an 18-month hiatus, the 37 year old Penn announced his intentions to return to active competition with plans to continue in the UFC's featherweight division. He was briefly expected to return in April 2016 at UFC 197. However, Penn's return was delayed after an investigation into criminal allegations made against him was launched. In turn, Penn was expected to face Dennis Siver on June 4, 2016, at UFC 199. However, Siver was forced out of the bout in early May with an undisclosed injury. He was replaced by Cole Miller. Subsequently, Penn himself was removed from the card on May 23 after he was flagged for the use of a medically administered IV during a non-fight period, when the use of IV had been recently banned 365 days a year.

Penn was expected to face Ricardo Lamas on October 15, 2016, at UFC Fight Night 97. However, on October 4, Penn pulled out of the fight citing an injury. In turn, the promotion announced on October 6 that they had cancelled the event entirely.

After three delays in getting his return fight scheduled, Penn returned to the UFC in early 2017. He faced Yair Rodríguez in the main event on January 15, 2017, at UFC Fight Night 103. Penn lost the one-sided fight via TKO in the second round.

A rescheduled bout with Dennis Siver took place on June 25, 2017, at UFC Fight Night 112. Penn lost the fight by majority decision.

For his next fight, Penn returned to lightweight to face Ryan Hall on December 29, 2018, at UFC 232; it was his third stint in the lightweight division. In preparation for the fight against Hall, Penn returned to train at Nova União. Penn lost the fight via a heel hook submission in the first round.

Penn faced Clay Guida on May 11, 2019, at UFC 237. He lost the fight by unanimous decision.

On July 26, 2019, news surfaced that Penn was expected to face Nik Lentz in a grudge match, at a UFC event to be determined. However, Penn was released from the promotion in early September after video evidence surfaced showing Penn fighting patrons in a bar brawl in Pahoa, Hawaii.

== Personal life ==
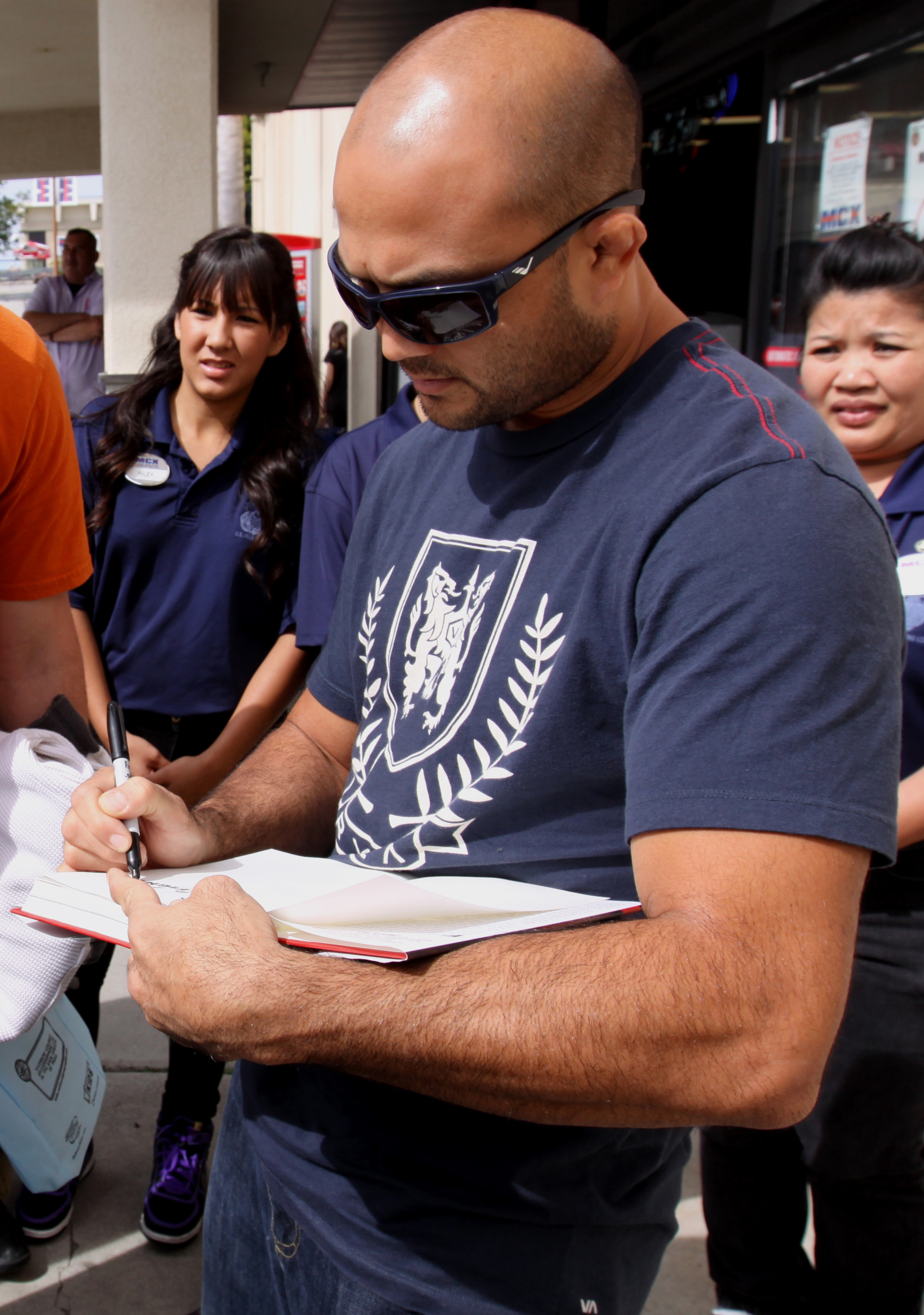
Penn autographing a copy of his autobiography, Why I Fight

Penn's nickname "B.J." is a shortened version of another nickname "Baby Jay", which itself derives from the fact that he is the last of three brothers named "Jay Dee Penn". His father, also named Jay Dee, named 3 of his 4 children "Jay Dee", while the fourth is named Reagan. In order to avoid confusion each of the sons named "Jay Dee" goes by a nickname: "Jay" (Jay Dee Penn), "Jay Dee" (Jay Dee Penn II), and "Baby Jay" (Jay Dee Penn III).

Being born in Hawaii, Penn takes much pride in his Hawaiian upbringing. Penn often plays Hawaiian music during his walk-out entrances, a combination of Hawaii ’78 into E Ala E, both performed by Hawaiian musician Israel Kamakawiwoʻole as a tribute to his Hawaiian heritage and respect for his opponents, fans and the fight game. Penn has also stated that he identifies strongly with his Korean ancestry and has traveled to South Korea to hold seminars. He also said that he gets his hot temper from his Korean side which helps him use this energy in his fights.

Penn has two daughters with the same mother. He says that they have never married and "it doesn't matter that much in Hawaii." Penn is the co-author of Mixed Martial Arts: The Book of Knowledge, an instructional book on mixed martial arts fighting. Penn, along with Dave Weintraub, authored the autobiography Why I Fight: The Belt is Just an Accessory in 2010. The book debuted at #22 on the New York Times bestseller list. Penn also appeared in the film Never Surrender in 2009.

Penn was also the subject of a Paternity Lawsuit in relation to a daughter, approximately a year after the girl's birth. On the 5th of October, 2021, Penn also announced his intention to run for governor in the 2022 Hawaii gubernatorial election. He lost the Republican primary, ending as the runner-up to winner Duke Aiona. Following the election, he filed a complaint with the Hawaii Supreme Court contesting the results.

In 2024, Penn ran for Hawaii County Council in District 1 (North and South Hilo–Hamakua–Waimea).

== Legal controversies ==
Penn has an extended history of alcohol-induced violence. In January 2015, Penn was arrested in Kihei, Hawaii and charged with assault after a brawl outside of a bar.

In 2019, Penn's estranged girlfriend, Shealen Uaiwa, filed a restraining order against him in October from her and Penn's children, alleging years of physical and sexual abuse. The order was granted in February 2019 and was in effect through October 2021.

In June 2019, an intoxicated Penn fought a bouncer outside of a Honolulu strip club.

On August 27, 2019, Penn was involved in a bar brawl on Hawaii's Big Island. Subsequently, Penn was released from the UFC in early September following the incident.

On February 7, 2020, Penn was involved in a single-car accident in his home town of Hilo, Hawaii. According to local media, Penn was allegedly speeding when he lost control of his pickup truck and his vehicle flipped in front of a Hilo shopping mall. Penn was the only occupant of the vehicle, and he was transported to a nearby hospital by ambulance. Penn was investigated by the Hilo Police Department for DUI and his blood was drawn at the scene, but no charges were filed.

On December 8, 2020, a paternity lawsuit was filed against Penn by the mother of his most recent child, Camila Amado.

On January 23, 2021, Penn was arrested in Honokaʻa, Hawaii, and was charged with DUI. Penn was later released from jail hours after his arrest pending an investigation. Video footage recorded from a bystander shows a handcuffed, drunk, and belligerent Penn yelling racial expletives at the police and the man recording while being assisted into an unmarked police vehicle.

Penn was arrested in his home on May 26, 2025, and charged with domestic abuse. He later posted bail and was scheduled to appear in court. The arrest follows a months-long online campaign where Penn was posting on social media his belief that various family members had been replaced by imposters. Penn's 79-year-old mother subsequently had a restraining order filed against him after this incident. A bench warrant was issued for Penn's arrest after he failed to appear in court on May 27; Penn was briefly considered a fugitive and wanted by the Hawaii Police Department. He was subsequently arrested again and blamed his failure to appear in court on contracting COVID-19. On September 15, Penn was arrested for a fifth time for violating the restraining order from his mother. As of September 17, 2025, Penn has been charged with five misdemeanor offenses since the 2025 Memorial Day weekend which are related to either the original alleged domestic abuse incident or the subsequent temporary restraining order, and is pending trial in Circuit Court.

== Legacy and influence ==
Since his debut in the Ultimate Fighting Championship, Penn emerged as one of the biggest stars in the history of the sport, headlining a total of eleven main-events (nine pay-per-view main-events) for the UFC during the course of his career (in addition to five for K-1). Penn was regarded as one of the most controversial and outspoken fighters in the history of mixed martial arts whose influence was considered instrumental in popularizing the UFC around the world in the 2000s and 2010s. His impact on the sport went beyond his UFC titles and dominant performances inside the octagon. A longtime advocate for drug testing in the sport, Penn was also the first to introduce an independent foundation in MMA to promote, coordinate and monitor the fight against performance-enhancing drugs in sports with the inclusion of Voluntary Anti-Doping Association (VADA) during his and his opponent's training camps.

Recognized for his role in the resurgence of the lightweight division, Penn is considered to have been the division's most influential figure, turning the weight class around (in bouts with Sean Sherk, Kenny Florian, Diego Sanchez, Jens Pulver, and Joe Stevenson) to become one of the UFC's most popular, at a time when they had considered disbanding the division altogether and many publications had questioned whether lighter-weights could be successful. His nickname, The Prodigy originates prior to him competing in mixed martial arts, from accomplishing his extraordinary feat in the sport of Brazilian Jiu Jitsu (earning his black belt in just under three years and winning the black belt division in the World Jiu-Jitsu Championship only three weeks later). His biography on the UFC website expressed this accomplishment as "an astonishing achievement in a sport where it takes the average athlete ten years or more to reach black belt status.

The Ultimate Fighting Championship's inaugural signature gym located in Honolulu, Hawaii, 'UFC Gym BJ Penn' is named in Penn's honor. The gym has grown to become one of the largest and most successful in the state of Hawaii. Penn (in his knockout victory over former UFC Lightweight Champion Sean Sherk) is featured in the UFC "Evolution" pay-per-view introduction.

=== Ranking in mixed martial arts history ===
He is widely considered one of the greatest lightweight (155 lbs) competitors in the sport's history, and as one of the greatest Welterweight (170 lbs) competitors as well due to his performances against Georges St-Pierre and Matt Hughes. Penn was also simultaneously ranked number one in both of these divisions following his back-to-back submission victories over Takanori Gomi and Matt Hughes, where he is the only fighter to hold such an honor.

Renowned boxing coach Freddie Roach has famously described Penn as the best boxer in all of mixed martial arts. Former UFC Middleweight Champion Anderson Silva, has said on numerous occasions that he believes Penn to be the greatest pound-for-pound fighter in the history of the sport. UFC Hall of Famer, UFC 10 and UFC 11 Tournament Champion and former UFC Heavyweight Champion Mark Coleman acknowledges Penn as his idol in the sport of mixed martial arts. Penn was ranked within the top five in the FightersOnly! Magazine '100 Greatest Fighters in History'.

==== UFC Hall of Fame ====
During the televised broadcast of UFC 187 in May 2015, it was revealed on Fox Sports that Penn would be inducted into the revamped UFC Hall of Fame under the Modern Category during International Fight week festivities prior to UFC 189.

== Championships and accomplishments ==
=== Mixed martial arts ===
- Ultimate Fighting Championship
  - UFC Hall of Fame (Modern Wing, Class of 2015)
  - UFC Lightweight Championship (One time)
    - Three successful title defenses
    - Tied (Benson Henderson, Frankie Edgar and Khabib Nurmagomedov) for the second most consecutive Lightweight title defenses in UFC history (3)
    - Most title bouts in UFC Lightweight division history (8)
    - Tied (Islam Makhachev) for most finishes in UFC Lightweight title bouts (4)
    - Tied (Justin Gaethje) for most knockouts in UFC Lightweight title bouts (2)
  - UFC Welterweight Championship (One time)
  - UFC 41 Lightweight Tournament Co-Champion (drew with Caol Uno in the finale)
  - Second Multi-Divisional Champion in UFC History
  - First fighter to win both the UFC Lightweight Championship and UFC Welterweight Championship
  - Unofficially Unified the UFC Lightweight Championship^{1}
  - Fight of the Night (Two times) vs. Matt Hughes II, Nick Diaz
  - Knockout of the Night (One time) vs. Matt Hughes III
  - Submission of the Night (Two times) vs. Joe Stevenson, Kenny Florian
  - UFC Encyclopedia Awards
    - Fight of the Night (Two times) vs. Georges St-Pierre I and Jens Pulver
    - Submission of the Night (One time) vs. Matt Hughes I
    - Knockout of the Night (One time) vs. Caol Uno
  - Third most consecutive losses in UFC history (7) (behind Tony Ferguson & Tai Tuivasa)
  - UFC.com Awards
    - 2006: Ranked #2 Fight of the Year vs. Georges St. Pierre 1 & Ranked #7 Fight of the Year vs. Matt Hughes 2
    - 2007: Ranked #7 Submission of the Year vs. Jens Pulver
    - 2008: Ranked #8 Fighter of the Year
    - 2009: Ranked #4 Fighter of the Year
    - 2010: Ranked #3 Knockout of the Year vs. Matt Hughes 3
- K-1 Fighting Network
  - Rumble on the Rock Lightweight Championship (One time)
  - K-1 World Grand Prix Hawaii Superfight Winner
- ESPN
  - #9 Ranked Men's MMA Fighter of the 21st Century
- FanSided
  - 2000s #4 Ranked MMA Fighter of the Decade
- Sports Illustrated (SI.com)
  - 2000s Fighter of the Decade (Top Ten)
  - UFC's Greatest Fight (First Place) vs. Matt Hughes on September 23, 2006
  - UFC's Greatest Fight (Eighth Place) vs. Georges St-Pierre on March 4, 2006
- MMA Fighting
  - Lightweight Fighter of the Year (2003)
  - Welterweight Fighter of the Year (2004)
  - Welterweight Fighter of the Year Runner-Up (2006)
- Fight Matrix
  - Rookie of the Year (2001)
  - Fighter of the Year (2004)
  - Most Noteworthy Match of Year (2002) vs. Jens Pulver on January 11, 2002
  - Most Noteworthy Match of Year (2009) vs. Georges St-Pierre on January 31, 2009
- Fight! Magazine
  - 2000s Fighter of the Decade (Top Five)
  - Mixed Martial Arts Lifetime Achievement Award
  - Submission of the Year (2009) vs. Kenny Florian on August 8, 2009
- Bleacher Report
  - 2000s Lightweight Fighter of the Decade
  - MMA's Greatest Lightweight of All Time
- Black Belt Magazine
  - Black Belt Magazine Hall of Fame
  - NHB Fighter of the Year (2008)
- Eurosport Fight Club
  - Full-Contact Fighter of the Year (2004)
  - Fight of the Year (2006) vs. Matt Hughes on September 23, 2006
- Sherdog Awards
  - Mixed Martial Arts Hall of Fame
  - Fighter of the Year – Honorable Mention (2004)
  - Beatdown of the Year (2008) vs. Joe Stevenson on January 19, 2008
- Bloody Elbow
  - 2009 Performance of the Year vs. Diego Sanchez at UFC 107

=== Brazilian jiu-jitsu ===
- International Brazilian Jiu-Jitsu Federation
  - 2000 World Jiu-Jitsu Championship Gold Medal; black belt division
    - First American to win gold in the black belt category
  - 1998 World Jiu-Jitsu Championship Silver Medal; blue belt division
  - 1999 World Jiu-Jitsu Championship Bronze Medal; brown belt division
  - 2000 CBJJ Brazilian Team Championships – Marrom Preta Leve: Nova Uniao
- Other
  - Grapplers Quest Lightweight Championship Superfight Winner
  - 1997 Joe Moreira Tournament – Blue belt, 1st place
  - 1999 Copa Pacific Tournament – Gold medal

1 Penn unofficially unified the UFC Lightweight Championship when he defeated Sean Sherk at UFC 84.

== Mixed martial arts record ==
Professional record breakdown
32 matches	16 wins	14 losses
By knockout	7	4
By submission	6	1
By decision	3	9
Draws	2	

Res.	Record	Opponent	Method	Event	Date	Round	Time	Location	Notes
Loss	16–14–2	Clay Guida	Decision (unanimous)	UFC 237	May 11, 2019	3	5:00	Rio de Janeiro, Brazil	
Loss	16–13–2	Ryan Hall	Submission (heel hook)	UFC 232	December 29, 2018	1	2:46	Inglewood, California, United States	Return to Lightweight.
Loss	16–12–2	Dennis Siver	Decision (majority)	UFC Fight Night: Chiesa vs. Lee	June 25, 2017	3	5:00	Oklahoma City, Oklahoma, United States	
Loss	16–11–2	Yair Rodríguez	TKO (punches)	UFC Fight Night: Rodríguez vs. Penn	January 15, 2017	2	0:24	Phoenix, Arizona, United States	
Loss	16–10–2	Frankie Edgar	TKO (punches)	The Ultimate Fighter: Team Edgar vs. Team Penn Finale	July 6, 2014	3	4:16	Las Vegas, Nevada, United States	Featherweight debut.
Loss	16–9–2	Rory MacDonald	Decision (unanimous)	UFC on Fox: Henderson vs. Diaz	December 8, 2012	3	5:00	Seattle, Washington, United States	
Loss	16–8–2	Nick Diaz	Decision (unanimous)	UFC 137	October 29, 2011	3	5:00	Las Vegas, Nevada, United States	UFC Welterweight title eliminator. Fight of the Night.
Draw	16–7–2	Jon Fitch	Draw (majority)	UFC 127	February 27, 2011	3	5:00	Sydney, Australia	
Win	16–7–1	Matt Hughes	KO (punches)	UFC 123	November 20, 2010	1	0:21	Auburn Hills, Michigan, United States	Return to Welterweight. Knockout of the Night.
Loss	15–7–1	Frankie Edgar	Decision (unanimous)	UFC 118	August 28, 2010	5	5:00	Boston, Massachusetts, United States	For the UFC Lightweight Championship.
Loss	15–6–1	Frankie Edgar	Decision (unanimous)	UFC 112	April 10, 2010	5	5:00	Abu Dhabi, United Arab Emirates	Lost the UFC Lightweight Championship.
Win	15–5–1	Diego Sanchez	TKO (doctor stoppage)	UFC 107	December 12, 2009	5	2:37	Memphis, Tennessee, United States	Defended the UFC Lightweight Championship.
Win	14–5–1	Kenny Florian	Submission (rear-naked choke)	UFC 101	August 8, 2009	4	3:54	Philadelphia, Pennsylvania, United States	Defended the UFC Lightweight Championship. Submission of the Night.
Loss	13–5–1	Georges St-Pierre	TKO (corner stoppage)	UFC 94	January 31, 2009	4	5:00	Las Vegas, Nevada, United States	For the UFC Welterweight Championship.
Win	13–4–1	Sean Sherk	TKO (knee and punches)	UFC 84	May 24, 2008	3	5:00	Las Vegas, Nevada, United States	Defended the UFC Lightweight Championship.
Win	12–4–1	Joe Stevenson	Submission (rear-naked choke)	UFC 80	January 19, 2008	2	4:02	Newcastle upon Tyne, England	Won the vacant UFC Lightweight Championship. Submission of the Night.
Win	11–4–1	Jens Pulver	Submission (rear-naked choke)	The Ultimate Fighter 5 Finale	June 23, 2007	2	3:12	Las Vegas, Nevada, United States	Return to Lightweight.
Loss	10–4–1	Matt Hughes	TKO (punches)	UFC 63	September 23, 2006	3	3:53	Anaheim, California, United States	For the UFC Welterweight Championship. Fight of the Night.
Loss	10–3–1	Georges St-Pierre	Decision (split)	UFC 58	March 4, 2006	3	5:00	Las Vegas, Nevada, United States	Return to Welterweight. UFC Welterweight title eliminator.
Win	10–2–1	Renzo Gracie	Decision (unanimous)	K-1: World Grand Prix Hawaii	July 29, 2005	3	5:00	Honolulu, Hawaii, United States	Light Heavyweight bout; Penn weighed in at 191 lbs and Gracie at 185 lbs.
Loss	9–2–1	Lyoto Machida	Decision (unanimous)	K-1: Hero's 1	March 26, 2005	3	5:00	Saitama, Japan	Openweight bout; Penn weighed in at 191 lbs and Machida at 225 lbs.
Win	9–1–1	Rodrigo Gracie	Decision (unanimous)	K-1 Rumble on the Rock 6	November 20, 2004	3	5:00	Honolulu, Hawaii, United States	Middleweight bout.
Win	8–1–1	Duane Ludwig	Submission (arm-triangle choke)	K-1 MMA: Romanex	May 22, 2004	1	1:45	Saitama, Japan	
Win	7–1–1	Matt Hughes	Submission (rear-naked choke)	UFC 46	January 31, 2004	1	4:39	Las Vegas, Nevada, United States	Welterweight debut. Won the UFC Welterweight Championship. Penn was stripped of the title on May 17, 2004 after leaving the UFC following a contract dispute.
Win	6–1–1	Takanori Gomi	Submission (rear-naked choke)	K-1 Rumble on the Rock 4	October 10, 2003	3	2:35	Honolulu, Hawaii, United States	Won the Rumble on the Rock Lightweight Championship.
Draw	5–1–1	Caol Uno	Draw (split)	UFC 41	February 28, 2003	5	5:00	Atlantic City, New Jersey, United States	For the vacant UFC Lightweight Championship. UFC Lightweight Tournament Final.
Win	5–1	Matt Serra	Decision (unanimous)	UFC 39	September 27, 2002	3	5:00	Uncasville, Connecticut, United States	UFC Lightweight Tournament Semifinal.
Win	4–1	Paul Creighton	TKO (punches)	UFC 37	May 10, 2002	2	3:23	Bossier City, Louisiana, United States	
Loss	3–1	Jens Pulver	Decision (majority)	UFC 35	January 11, 2002	5	5:00	Uncasville, Connecticut, United States	For the UFC Lightweight Championship.
Win	3–0	Caol Uno	KO (punches)	UFC 34	November 2, 2001	1	0:11	Las Vegas, Nevada, United States	UFC Lightweight title eliminator.
Win	2–0	Din Thomas	KO (knee and punches)	UFC 32	June 29, 2001	1	2:42	East Rutherford, New Jersey, United States	
Win	1–0	Joey Gilbert	TKO (punches)	UFC 31	May 4, 2001	1	4:57	Atlantic City, New Jersey, United States	Lightweight debut.

== Pay-per-view bouts ==
No.	Event	Fight	Date	PPV Buys
1.	UFC 63	Hughes vs. Penn 2	September 23, 2006	400,000
2.	UFC 80	Penn vs. Stevenson	January 19, 2008	225,000
3.	UFC 84	Penn vs. Sherk	May 24, 2008	475,000
4.	UFC 94	St-Pierre vs. Penn 2	January 31, 2009	920,000
5.	UFC 101	Penn vs. Florian	August 8, 2009	850,000
6.	UFC 107	Penn vs. Sanchez	December 12, 2009	620,000
7.	UFC 112	Penn vs. Edgar (co)	April 10, 2010	500,000
8.	UFC 118	Edgar vs. Penn 2	August 28, 2010	570,000
9.	UFC 123	Hughes vs. Penn 3 (co)	November 20, 2010	500,000
10.	UFC 127	Penn vs. Fitch	February 27, 2011	260,000
11.	UFC 137	Penn vs. Diaz	October 29, 2011	280,000
Total sales				5,600,000

== Filmography ==
=== Film and television ===
Year	Title	Role	Notes
2007	The Ultimate Fighter 5	Himself	Head coach
2008	Renzo Gracie: Legacy	Himself	
2009	BJ Penn: 90 Days	Himself	
2009	Never Surrender	BJ	
2010	Last Call with Carson Daly	Himself	
2010	ESPN: Sport Science	Himself	
2011	Fighting Fear	Himself	
2011	Hawaii Five-0	Kapu Member	
2012	MMA Uncensored Live	Himself	
2012	The Fighters	Himself	
2014	The Ultimate Fighter: Team Edgar vs. Team Penn	Himself	Head coach
2014	UFC Presents Mana: BJ Penn	Himself	

=== Video games ===
Year	Title	Role
2002	UFC: Throwdown	Himself
2003	UFC: Tapout 2	Himself
2004	UFC: Sudden Impact	Himself
2009	UFC 2009 Undisputed	Himself
2010	UFC Undisputed 2010	Himself
2012	UFC Undisputed 3	Himself
2014	EA Sports UFC	Himself
2016	EA Sports UFC 2	Himself
2018	EA Sports UFC 3	Himself
2020	EA Sports UFC 4	Himself
2023	EA Sports UFC 5	Himself

== See also ==
- Double champions in MMA
- List of Brazilian Jiu-Jitsu practitioners
- List of male mixed martial artists
- List of multi-sport athletes
- List of multi-sport champions
- List of UFC champions
- UFC Hall of Fame

== Notes ==
Sporting positions
New title	Rumble on the Rock Lightweight Champion; October 10, 2003 – January 31, 2004	Vacant Penn signed with UFC
Preceded by Matt Hughes	UFC Welterweight Champion; January 31, 2004 – May 17, 2004	Vacant Penn signed with K-1 Title next held by Matt Hughes
Vacant Title last held by Sean Sherk	UFC Lightweight Champion; January 19, 2008 – April 10, 2010	Succeeded by Frankie Edgar
