= Kyra Gracie =

Brazilian Jiu-Jitsu and grappling practitioner

Kyra Gracie Guimarães
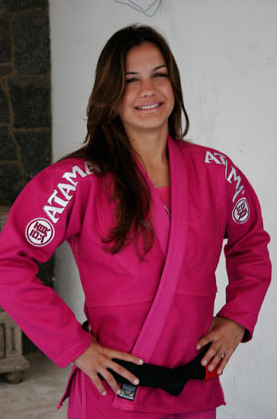
- Kyra Gracie
- Born: Kyra Gracie Guimarães; 29 May 1985 (age 41); Rio de Janeiro, Brazil
- Height: 5 ft 7 in (170 cm)
- Weight: 130 lb (59 kg; 9 st 4 lb)
- Division: Feather
- Style: Brazilian Jiu-Jitsu
- Team: Renzo Gracie Combat Team; Gracie Barra/Osvaldo
- Rank: 4th deg. black belt in BJJ; black belt in Judo

Other information
- Occupation: BJJ Instructor
- Notable relatives: Gracie family
- Mixed martial arts record from Sherdog

Kyra Gracie Guimarães (born 29 May 1985) is a Brazilian submission grappler and a 4th degree black belt Brazilian jiu-jitsu (BJJ) practitioner. A member of the Gracie family and a highly decorated competitor, she is a four-time World Jiu-Jitsu champion and a three-time ADCC Submission Fighting World champion.

== Biography ==
Kyra Gracie is one of only two women in the Gracie family to achieve a black belt in BJJ. She is the first Gracie woman to actively compete in the sport. For several years she lived full-time in the United States, where she is associated with the Renzo Gracie Academy in New York and the Gracie Barra Academy in Lake Forest, California.

Gracie won the women's under 60 kg title at the ADCC submission championships in 2005, 2007, and 2011. She finished first at the IBJJF world championships in 2006, twice in 2008 (lightweight and absolute divisions), and 2010 She also finished second in 2004, 2005, twice in 2009 (light and open divisions), and 2011.

She has been associated with the Gracie Barra Academy and Evolve/Gordo Jiu Jitsu Academy in Rio de Janeiro. Gracie competed in tournament six of Kunoichi, the female version of Sasuke (or Ninja Warrior). She announced training for a debut in MMA. In addition to BJJ, she also trains in judo and wrestling.

In 2010, Gracie began competing for the newly formed Gracie Elite Team, a Brazilian jiu-jitsu competition team, composed of competitors representing Rilion Gracie, Renzo Gracie, Ralph Gracie, Cesar Gracie, and the late Ryan Gracie’s respective academies. In 2010 Gracie also trained in boxing at the Nobre Arte gym in the Morro do Cantagalo area of Rio de Janeiro under the tutelage of boxing coach Claudio Coelho, to complement her grappling skills.

In 2010, Gracie, along with family members Rilion, Rolles, Roger, Igor, and Gregor began Gracie Brazilian Jiu-Jitsu Adventure Camp. The purpose of the camp was to provide training in Brazilian jiu-jitsu with access to the local tourism of the various host countries.

In 2023, she became the first Gracie family woman to promote a member of her family to black belt, her cousin Rayron Gracie.

== Personal life ==
Gracie is the granddaughter of Robson Gracie, who is the second son of Carlos Gracie Sr, the founder of BJJ. Gracie has four younger half-siblings: three half-sisters and a half-brother. Her mother, Flavia Gracie, and her uncles Charles Gracie, Ralph Gracie, Renzo Gracie, Ryan Gracie (now deceased) all practice BJJ.

Gracie has two daughters with the Brazilian actor Malvino Salvador.

== Brazilian Jiu-Jitsu and grappling competitive summary ==
In the major championships at black belt level:

- 4x World Championship champion (2006 / 2008 (+ Absolute) / 2010)
- 2nd place World Championship 2004
- 2x Pan-American Championship champion (2005 / 2007)
- 3x Brazilian Nationals champion (2005 / 2008 (+ Absolute))

Main Achievements in colored belts:

- 3x Pan-American Championship champion (2001/2002 blue belt, 2003 purple)
- 4x Brazilian Nationals champion (1998 / 1999 / 2000 / 2001)

Other achievements:

- 3 x ADCC World Championship champion (2005 / 2007 / 2011)
- 5x BJJ New York State Champion (1998, 1999, 2000, 2001, 2002)
- 1x Asian Championship champion (2006)
- First woman to be inducted into the ADCC Hall of Fame
