= Junko Kawada =

Japanese actress and singer

- 河田 純子
- Born: November 22, 1974 (age 51); Akita, Akita, Japan
- Other name: Junko Oyama (大山 純子); Junko Ōka (桜華 純子); Jurika (樹凛花)
- Occupations: Singer-songwriter; actress
- Spouse: Shungo Oyama (m. 2010)
- Musical career
- Genres: J-pop; pop rock
- Instrument: Vocals
- Years active: 1983–1995; 2005–2006
- Label: CBS Sony

Japanese name
- Kanji: 河田 純子
- Hiragana: かわだ じゅんこ
- Katakana: カワダ ジュンコ
Transcriptions
- Romanization: Kawada Junko
- Website: www.kawadajunko.com

Junko Kawada (河田 純子, Kawada Junko) (born November 22, 1974, in Akita, Akita, Japan) is a former J-pop idol, singer-songwriter and actress. Throughout her career, she released three albums and nine singles.

== Biography ==
=== Early life ===
Junko Kawada graduated from Meguro Nihon University Junior High and High School and the Junior College of Kagawa Nutrition University.

=== Idol career ===
During her first year in junior high school, Kawada entered an audition hosted by CBS Sony, Fuji TV, and Shueisha. In her second year of junior high school, she left her parents' home and moved to a dormitory that was run by CBS Sony to focus on her singing and dancing lessons until she made her debut at the age of 13.

Kawada finished runner-up on the 2nd Tohato All Raisin Princess Contest in 1987, losing to Hanako Asada. Two years later, she formed the idol unit Rakutenshi (楽天使) with Shinobu Nakayama and Mamiko Tayama. In 1990, Rakutenshi became part of the idol group Nanatsuboshi (七つ星; lit. Seven Stars), which included Rumi Shishido and Lip's. During her career as an idol, Kawada appeared in numerous commercials and recorded anime theme songs.

=== Retirement and post-career ===
Kawada retired in 1995 at the age of 20 without any formal announcements and became an office lady for 10 years until she became a middle manager. In 2005, she returned to the entertainment scene as a member of the idol duo Lenpha, under the pseudonym "Jurika" (樹凛花). The duo lasted a year before Kawada finally announced her retirement.

In 2009, Kawada moved to the health and beauty business by opening Salon de Angel Angel (サロン・ド・エンジェル・エンジェル, Saron do Enjeru Enjeru) under the name Junko Ōka (桜華 純子, Ōka Junko). In addition, she expanded her business in Kenya to help create jobs for underprivileged neighborhoods.

In 2013, Kawada recorded the songs "Egao" and "Aitakute" for lyricist Miju, who was fighting a rare illness.

== Personal life ==
Kawada married MMA fighter Shungo Oyama on September 20, 2010. She stood by him at ringside until his retirement in 2014.

== Discography ==
=== Studio albums ===
Year	Information	Oricon weekly peak position	Sales	RIAJ certification
1989	Ashita Genki Nina are: Released: August 21, 1989; Label: CBS Sony; Formats: LP, CD, cassette	46		
1990	Jun Mind: Released: June 21, 1990; Label: CBS Sony; Formats: CD, cassette	25		
1991	Prologue: Released: March 1, 1991; Label: Sony Records; Formats: CD, cassette	55		

=== Compilation albums ===
Title	Album details
Golden Best Limited: Complete Singles Collection	Released: March 21, 2011; Label: Sony Music Direct/GT Music; Formats: CD, digital

=== Singles ===
List of singles, with selected chart positions
Title	Date	Peak chart positions	Sales (JPN)	RIAJ certification	Album
Title	Date	JPN Oricon	Sales (JPN)	RIAJ certification	Album
"Kagayaki no Sketch"	March 1, 1989	52			Ashita Genki Nina are
"Kimi no Yume no Tame ni"	May 12, 1989	44			Ashita Genki Nina are
"Suteki ni Wa-ga-ma-ma"	July 21, 1989	51			Ashita Genki Nina are
"Hero Girl"	November 22, 1989	61			Non-album single
"Kakū no Koibitotachi"	March 21, 1990	38			Jun Mind
"Shi-n-yu-u"	August 1, 1990	39			Jun Mind
"Never Mind"	November 1, 1990	40			Prologue
"Owaranai Toki"	February 1, 1991	64			Prologue
"Shiroi Iro wa Koibito no Iro"	October 25, 1991	80			Non-album single
"Egao" / "Aitakute"	April 17, 2013	—			Non-album single
"—" denotes a release that did not chart.
