= Shungo Oyama =

Japanese mixed martial arts fighter

- Born: Ōyama Toshiyuki; IPA: [oːjama toɕijɯki] 大山 利幸; April 11, 1974 (age 52); Nasu District, Tochigi, Japan
- Nationality: Japanese
- Height: 1.80 m (5 ft 11 in)
- Weight: 83.4 kg (184 lb; 13.13 st)
- Division: Heavyweight; Light Heavyweight; Middleweight; Welterweight
- Style: MMA; Judo, Sambo
- Fighting out of: Tokyo, Japan
- Team: Freelance
- Rank: Black Belt in Judo
- Years active: 2001–2014

Mixed martial arts record
- Total: 34
- Wins: 14
- By knockout: 4
- By submission: 8
- By decision: 2
- Losses: 19
- By knockout: 15
- By submission: 3
- By decision: 1
- No contests: 1

Other information
- University: International Budo University
- Mixed martial arts record from Sherdog

Shungo Oyama (Japanese: 大山 峻護 Ōyama Shungo [oːjama ɕɯŋɡo]; born April 11, 1974) is a Japanese former professional mixed martial artist. A professional competitor from 2001 to 2014, he competed for the PRIDE Fighting Championships, Pancrase, RINGS, DREAM, K-1, and King of the Cage.

== Early life ==
Oyama was born in Nasu District in Tochigi Prefecuture, Japan on April 11, 1974, as Toshiyuki Oyama. He started practicing Judo when he was five years old, winning the All Japan Businessmen's Individual Championship, among other titles. He did not limit itself to a single grappling style, and also won the All Japan Sambo Championship and the All Japan Combat Wrestling Championship. Then, he began training MMA and won All Japan Amateur Shooto Championship, making a pro debut in 2001.

== Mixed martial arts career ==
=== Background and fighting style ===
He is best known for being a student of Japanese judo superstar Hidehiko Yoshida, and briefly trained with three-time King of Pancrase Bas Rutten. Shungo has also trained at the famed Takada Dojo, run by former PRIDE General Director Nobuhiko Takada.

Though his record is not impressive, Shungo has gained respect for his die hard spirit, and stubbornness to submit. On more than one occasion he has been injured or choked unconscious due to his refusal to tap out.

=== PRIDE ===
Oyama had his anticipated debut in PRIDE Fighting Championships in 2001 against feared Wanderlei Silva. In a fight of 30 seconds, Oyama met a spirited striking exchange, but he was overwhelmed and knocked out while he tried to avoid Silva. Shungo followed with a bout against famed Brazilian jiu-jitsu Wallid Ismail, but he underperformed again. The judoka met Ismail in his field of expertise by pulling guard early with a guillotine choke, which only allowed the Brazilian to pass guard, but Oyama escaped and contained Wallid until the second round. At the end, however, Ismail blocked a triangle choke attempt from Oyama and locked an arm triangle choke which Shungo refused to tap out to, rendering the Japanese unconscious. After the match, it was revealed that Oyama had suffered a retinal detachment.

His third match in PRIDE finally dissipated the negative criticism towards Oyama when he faced Renzo Gracie of the famed Gracie Jiu-Jitsu family. With a combination of his own unorthodox striking style, a good takedown defense and a little Kazushi Sakuraba imitation, Shungo was able to frustrate Gracie and dominate the fight to gain a unanimous decision. In a controversial moment, Gracie, irritated by his fight antics, spit in Shungo's face. Shortly after, Ryan Gracie challenged him to a fight to avenge Renzo. Oyama and Ryan met in the main event of PRIDE 22-Beasts From The East 2, in a fight in which the BJJ specialist caught Oyama in an armbar. The judoka, in a last action of defiance, refused to submit and got his arm broken. After the fight, Ryan assaulted Oyama and verbally insulted him before being restrained.

Oyama faced Dan Henderson in 2003, going to the fight with an arm injury. After being knocked out by punches, medical examination showed that his eye injury had reopened, and he had to go to hiatus. His last fight in PRIDE was against Mirko Cro Cop, losing again by KO.

=== Post-PRIDE ===
In 2006, Oyama faced another Gracie family member in the form of Rodrigo Gracie at the HERO'S 6 event. He got his second victory over the family, controlling Rodrigo and landing ground and pound for a unanimous decision.

Oyama faced Handong Kong at Pancrase 257 on March 30, 2014. He won by first round heel hook.

He participated "Martial Combat 10" as a substitute of Daiju Takase in Singapore for the title of Light Heavyweight(-87 kg) on September 16, 2010. He beat Brian Gassaway from USA with an inverted triangle choke and won the first professional title in his career.

After winning, he proposed to Junko Kawada, with whom he had a four-year relationship while in the cage. They were married in his hometown.

== Mixed martial arts record ==
Professional record breakdown
33 matches	14 wins	19 losses
By knockout	4	15
By submission	8	3
By decision	2	1

Res.	Record	Opponent	Method	Event	Date	Round	Time	Location	Notes
Loss	14–19	Yuji Sakuragi	TKO (corner stoppage)	Pancrase 263	December 6, 2014	2	1:03	Tokyo, Japan	Openweight bout.
Loss	14–18	Ikkei Nagamura	KO (punch)	Pancrase 260	August 10, 2014	2	1:01	Tokyo, Japan	
Win	14–17	Handong Kong	Submission (heel hook)	Pancrase 257	March 30, 2014	1	3:26	Yokohama, Kanagawa, Japan	
Loss	13–17	Jordan Currie	Submission (arm-triangle choke)	Pancrase 252: 20th Anniversary	September 29, 2013	1	5:00	Yokohama, Kanagawa, Japan	
Loss	13–16	Eun Soo Lee	KO (punches)	Road FC 10: Monson vs. Kang	November 12, 2012	1	2:48	Busan, South Korea	Lost the ROAD FC Middleweight Championship.
Loss	13–15	Asif Tagiecv	TKO (knees and punches)	RINGS Vol. 2: Conquisito	September 23, 2012	1	4:44	Tokyo, Japan	
Loss	13–14	Ryo Kawamura	KO (soccer kick)	Pancrase: Progress Tour 7	June 2, 2012	1	4:19	Tokyo, Japan	For the Pancrase Middleweight Championship.
Win	13–13	Hae Suk Son	TKO (punches)	Road FC 6: The Final Four	February 5, 2012	1	2:10	Seoul, South Korea	Won the ROAD FC Middleweight Championship.
Win	12–13	Jong Dae Kim	Submission (heel hook)	Road FC 6: The Final Four	February 5, 2012	1	1:44	Seoul, South Korea	
Win	11–13	Denis Kang	TKO (knees)	Road FC 5: Night of Champions	December 3, 2011	1	4:30	Seoul, South Korea	Return to Middleweight.
Win	10–13	Kyu Suk Son	KO (punch)	Pancrase: Impressive Tour 9	September 4, 2011	1	0:11	Tokyo, Japan	
Win	9–13	Brian Gassaway	Technical Submission (inverted triangle choke)	MC: Martial Combat 10	September 16, 2010	1	1:50	Sentosa, Singapore	Won the Martial Combat Light Heavyweight Championship.
Loss	8–13	Vitaly Shemetov	KO (punches)	X-1 Nations Collide	June 4, 2010	1	1:31	Honolulu, Hawaii	Return to Light Heavyweight.
Win	8–12	Mike Wimmer	Submission (heel hook)	KOTC: Toryumon	January 30, 2010	1	1:07	Ginowan, Okinawa, Japan	Welterweight debut.
Loss	7–12	Andrews Nakahara	TKO (punches)	DREAM.8	April 5, 2009	1	2:00	Nagoya, Aichi, Japan	Catchweight (86 kg) bout.
Loss	7–11	Yoon Dong-Sik	Decision (unanimous)	DREAM 2: Middleweight Grand Prix 2008 First Round	April 29, 2008	2	5:00	Saitama, Saitama, Japan	Middleweight bout; 2008 DREAM Middleweight Grand Prix First Round.
Win	7–10	Carlos Newton	TKO (submission to punches)	HERO'S 2007 in Korea	October 28, 2007	3	2:42	Seoul, South Korea	Catchweight (90 kg) bout.
Loss	6–10	Melvin Manhoef	TKO (punches)	HERO'S 7	October 9, 2006	1	1:04	Yokohama, Kanagawa, Japan	Light Heavyweight bout; HERO'S 2006 Light Heavyweight Grand Prix Semifinal.
Win	6–9	Rodrigo Gracie	Decision (unanimous)	HERO'S 6	August 5, 2006	2	5:00	Tokyo, Japan	Light Heavyweight bout; HERO'S 2006 Light Heavyweight Grand Prix Quarterfinal.
Loss	5–9	Melvin Manhoef	TKO (doctor stoppage)	HERO'S 4	March 15, 2006	1	2:51	Tokyo, Japan	
Win	5–8	Peter Aerts	Submission (heel hook)	K-1-Premium 2005 Dynamite	December 31, 2005	1	0:30	Osaka, Japan	
Win	4–8	Yun Seob Kwak	Submission (achilles lock)	HERO'S 2005 in Seoul	November 5, 2005	1	1:14	Seoul, South Korea	Light Heavyweight bout.
Loss	3–8	Sam Greco	KO (knees and punches)	HERO'S 3	September 7, 2005	1	2:37	Tokyo, Japan	
Win	3–7	Valentijn Overeem	Submission (toe hold)	HERO'S 1	March 26, 2005	1	1:28	Saitama, Saitama, Japan	
Loss	2–7	Sean O'Haire	TKO (punches)	K-1 Fighting Network Rumble on the Rock 2004	November 20, 2004	1	0:31	Honolulu, Hawaii, United States	
Loss	2–6	Mirko Cro Cop	TKO (punches)	PRIDE Bushido 4	July 19, 2004	1	1:00	Nagoya, Aichi, Japan	Return to Heavyweight.
Loss	2–5	Dan Henderson	TKO (punches)	PRIDE 25	March 16, 2003	1	3:28	Yokohama, Kanagawa, Japan	Light Heavyweight debut.
Loss	2–4	Ryan Gracie	Submission (armbar)	PRIDE 22	September 29, 2002	1	1:37	Nagoya, Aichi, Japan	
Win	2–3	Renzo Gracie	Decision (unanimous)	PRIDE 21	June 23, 2002	3	5:00	Saitama, Saitama, Japan	
Loss	1–3	Wallid Ismail	Submission (triangle choke)	PRIDE 15	July 29, 2001	2	2:30	Saitama, Saitama, Japan	
Loss	1–2	Wanderlei Silva	TKO (punches)	PRIDE 14: Clash of the Titans	May 27, 2001	1	0:30	Yokohama, Kanagawa, Japan	Return to Heavyweight.
Loss	1–1	Phillip Miller	TKO (strikes)	KOTC 8: Bombs Away	April 29, 2001	2	3:00	Williams, California, United States	Middleweight debut.
Win	1–0	Mike Bourke	KO (punch)	KOTC 7: Wet and Wild	February 24, 2001	1	0:17	San Jacinto, California, United States	

== Championships and accomplishments ==
=== Mixed martial arts ===
- K-1 Hero's
  - 2006 K-1 Hero's Light Heavyweight Grand Prix Semifinalist
- Martial Combat
  - Martial Combat Light Heavyweight Championship (1 Time)
- ROAD FC
  - ROAD FC Middleweight Championship (1 Time, first)
- Shooto
  - 7th All Japan Amateur Shooto Championship, Light heavyweight winner (September 10, 2000)

=== Judo ===
  - 28th All Japan Business Groups Judo Individual Championship, Men 81 kg class winner

=== Sambo ===
  - 21st All Japan Sambo Championship, Men Senior 82 kg class runner-up (1997)
  - 22nd All Japan Sambo Championship, Men Senior 82 kg class winner (1998)
  - 24th All Japan Sambo Championship, Men Senior 82 kg class winner (June 28, 1998)
  - 25th All Japan Sambo Championship, Men Senior 82 kg class winner (1999)
  - 26th All Japan Sambo Championship, Men Senior 82 kg class winner (July 16, 2000)
