= Marcio Feitosa =

Martial artist

- Born: Marcio Feitosa Souza; May 16, 1976 (age 50); Rio de Janeiro, Rio de Janeiro, Brazil
- Nationality: (Brazil) Brazilian
- Height: 5 ft 9 in (175 cm)
- Weight: 154 lb (70 kg)
- Division: Lightweight
- Style: Brazilian Jiu-Jitsu
- Team: Gracie Barra
- Teacher: Carlos Gracie, Jr.
- Rank: 6th degree black belt in Brazilian Jiu-Jitsu

Other information
- Website: http://www.graciebarra.com/

Marcio Feitosa (May 16, 1976) is a Brazilian 6th degree black belt in Brazilian jiu-jitsu. He has learned directly from Carlos Gracie Jr., founder of the Gracie Barra Academy in Rio de Janeiro. He has risen to the podium eight times from 1997 to 2006 at several world championships.

In 2013, Feitosa was ranked one of the Top 10 fighters of all time by the BJJ Heroes website. Throughout his career he has collected many titles such as the IBJJF World Championship, the ADCC Submission Wrestling World Championship, the Brazilian Nationals and the Pan-Americans. He is one of the strongest competitors of his generation having won against fighters such as Urijah Faber, Léo Vieira, Vítor Ribeiro, Royler Gracie and Leonardo Santos.

Since the age of 15 he has been acting as a teacher, starting as an assistant instructor. He is the co-founder of the Gracie Barra Headquarters in Irvine, California and the executive director of Gracie Barra Brasil.

== Early life ==
Marcio Feitosa was born on May 16, 1976, and raised in the Barra da Tijuca neighborhood, home for several fighters and instructors of the Gracie Family, such as Carlos Gracie Jr., Roger Gracie, Kyra Gracie and Ryan Gracie.

His father abandoned the household when he and his brother were very young.

When he was 12 years old he began studying Brazilian jiu-jitsu with Carlos Gracie Jr. at the Gracie Barra Academy, founded two years before. At the age of 15 he was invited by his master Carlos Gracie Jr. to be an assistant instructor at the academy.

Feitosa received the black belt at the age of 19. In 1996 he wrote his name in the BJJ history when he won the Pan-American Brazilian Jiu-Jitsu Championship, held in the United States, and the Brazilian National Jiu-Jitsu Championship.

In the year 1997, he became a teacher in Japan, where he met Nao Takigawa. At Feitosa invitation, Takigawa moved to Brazil in 1998 to train at the Gracie Barra academy and became a black belt in 2004. The following year, Feitosa and Takigawa founded the Gracie Barra Japan, in Kobe.

From 2007 to 2009, he was a columnist for Tapout, a martial arts magazine published by SMP, Inc.

In 2015 he taught the first class ever at the brand new Gracie Barra Itaipava academy founded by actor Thiago Lacerda and Rodrigo Scott.

== Instructor lineage ==
Mitsuyo "Count Koma" Maeda → Carlos Gracie, Sr. → Carlos Gracie Jr. → Marcio Feitosa

== Tournament titles ==
Marcio Feitosa is a black belt since 1996. He has been eight times at the World Championship finals, winning on three occasions.

Year	Tournament	Position
1996	Pan-American Championship	Winner
1996	Brazilian National Jiu-Jitsu Championship	Winner
1996	Brazilian National Jiu-Jitsu Championship by Teams	Winner
1997	World Jiu-Jitsu Championship	Winner
1997	Pan-American Championship	Winner
1997	Superfight against Royler Gracie	Winner
1998	Canada Jiu-Jitsu/Submission Open (Canada)	Winner
1998	World Jiu-Jitsu Championship	Second Place
1998	Pan-American Championship	Winner
1998	Brazilian National Jiu-Jitsu Championship	Winner
1998	Brazilian National Jiu-Jitsu Championship by Teams	Winner
1998	Olympic Arena Superfight against Vítor Ribeiro Champion Pitagoras Superfight	Winner
1999	ADCC Trials Jiu-Jitsu x Jiu-Jitsu Champion World Jiu-Jitsu Championship	Second Place
1999	Pan-American Championship	Winner
1999	Brazilian National Jiu-Jitsu Championship	Winner
1999	Brazilian National Jiu-Jitsu Championship by Teams	Second Place
2000	ADCC Trials Jiu-Jitsu x Luta Livre	Winner
2000	ADCC World Submission Wrestling (Abu Dhabi)	Third Place
2000	World Jiu-Jitsu Championship	Second Place
2000	Brazilian National Jiu-Jitsu Championship	Winner
2000	Professional Jiu-Jitsu League	Second Place
2001	ADCC World Submission Wrestling (Abu Dhabi)	Winner
2001	World Jiu-Jitsu Championship	Winner
2001	Brazilian National Jiu-Jitsu Championship	Second Place
2001	Arnold World Gracie Submission	Second Place
2002	World Jiu-Jitsu Championship	Winner
2003	USA X Brasil Challenge	Winner
2003	World Jiu-Jitsu Championship	Second Place
2003	Brazilian National Jiu-Jitsu Championship	Winner
2005	Pan-American Championship	Winner
2005	USA X BRASIL Challenge	Winner
2005	ADCC World Submission Wrestling (Abu Dhabi)	Third Place
2006	World Jiu-Jitsu Championship	Second Place
2007	Pan-American No-Gi Championship	Winner

== Mixed martial arts record ==
Professional record breakdown
2 matches	0 wins	1 loss
By decision	0	1
Draws	1	

Res.	Record	Opponent	Method	Event	Date	Round	Time	Location	Notes
Loss	0-1-1	(Poland) Bart Palaszewski	Decision (Split)	IFL - Gracie vs. Miletich	September 23, 2006	3	4:00	Yokohama, Kanagawa, Japan	
Draw	0-0-1	(Japan) Dokonjonosuke Mishima	Draw	Shooto - R.E.A.D. 9	August 27, 2000	3	5:00	Moline, Illinois, United States	

== Personal life ==
From 2001 to 2004 Marcio Feitosa dated and was engaged to Brazilian actress Taís Araújo.

== Filmography ==
Year	Title	Role	Director	Notes
2008	Renzo Gracie: Legacy	Himself (Uncredited)	Gethin Aldous	Documentary
2014	Inner Strength	Himself	Ravi Kumar	Documentary

== DVD releases ==
Marcio Feitosa has produced and appeared on various instructional DVDs releases.

DVD Title	Director	Length	Production Co.	Year	Region
ADCC 2001 Submission Wrestling World Championships (6-DVD set)	Jeff Osborne	1,020 min	Progressive Arts Media	2008	All
Aikido to BJJ with Derek Nakagawa & Marcio Feitosa	Dave Contreras	56 min	Cryo Productions	2009	All
Champions of Gracie Barra	Mito Pontual	96 min	Total Extreme Productions	2004	All
Gracie Barra Advanced Curriculum (2-DVD set)	Flavio Almeida	288 min	Budo Videos	2010	All
Gracie Barra Fundamentals (4-DVD set)	Flavio Almeida	480 min	Budo Videos	2008	All
Oscar de Jiu-Jitsu Vol. 2		110 min	On The Mat	2006	1
