= Paul Creighton =

American mixed martial arts fighter

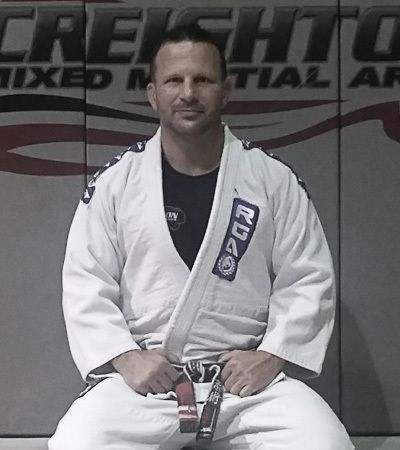
- Paul Creighton
- Born: July 4, 1970 (age 56); Manhattan, New York, United States
- Nationality: American
- Height: 5 ft 6 in (1.68 m)
- Weight: 155 lb (70 kg; 11.1 st)
- Division: Lightweight
- Team: Renzo Gracie Combat Team
- Rank: 4th degree black belt in Brazilian Jiu-Jitsu black belt in Judo black belt in Japanese Jujitsu black belt in Karate
- Years active: 1999–2002

Mixed martial arts record
- Total: 4
- Wins: 3
- By submission: 2
- By decision: 1
- Losses: 1
- By knockout: 1

Other information
- Mixed martial arts record from Sherdog

Paul Creighton (born July 4, 1970) is a retired American mixed martial artist and Brazilian Jiu Jitsu black belt under Renzo Gracie who competed in the Lightweight division of the Ultimate Fighting Championship. His last fight in mixed martial arts competition, came at a losing effort at UFC 37: High Impact at the CenturyTel Center in Bossier City, Louisiana on May 10, 2002 against B.J. Penn.

== Biography ==
=== Career ===
Paul Creighton has studied Martial Arts since the age of five. A Sport Jujitsu Middleweight World Champion in 2000, Creighton was the United States Sport Jujitsu team captain in 1998 and 2000, and a member of the three-time World Champion USA Sport Jujitsu team. As a competitive Wrestler in High School and College, Creighton compiled a 134-16-1 (win-loss-tie) record and was a Junior Olympic Gold Medalist. Paul has competed extensively in many competitions including Mixed Martial Arts in the Ultimate Fighting Championship, where he fought B.J. Penn.

Creighton received his bachelor's degree in Health/Science from SUNY Brockport in New York and his master's degree in Health and Physical Education from Radford University in Radford, Virginia.

Creighton's training covers various styles of Martial Arts. Paul was awarded his Black Belt in Brazilian Jiu-Jitsu from Renzo Gracie in 2005. He has also earned Black Belts in Judo, Japanese Jujitsu, and Karate. While Paul was in New York City he trained in Boxing under one of New York’s best trainers, Thomas Malloy. Since the mid-1990s, Creighton has studied Brazilian Jiu-Jitsu under the guidance of Renzo Gracie.

Creighton now teaches various martial arts at his own academy, Creighton Mixed Martial Arts, in Suwanee, Georgia.

=== Mixed martial arts ===
Creighton made his mixed martial arts debut in 1999, defeating Rob Drouin by decision.

Following, his victory, Creighton fought and defeated MMA veteran Thomas Denny; finishing him via armbar in the first round.

Creighton then faced Anthony Britton, winning the bout by submission via kimura in the first round.

After compiling three straight victories, Creighton signed with the Ultimate Fighting Championship. In his first bout for the promotion, Creighton faced future UFC Lightweight Champion, UFC Welterweight Champion, and UFC Hall of Famer B.J. Penn. After an unsuccessful first round, he was finished in the second round by Penn via strikes which resulted in his first MMA loss. Following the defeat, Creighton retired from MMA competition.

== Championships and accomplishments ==
=== Submission grappling ===
- World Sport Jujitsu Association
  - Sport Jujitsu Middleweight World Champion
  - World Champion USA Sport Jujitsu Team (Three times)
  - 2000 United States Sport Jujitsu Team Captain
  - 1998 United States Sport Jujitsu Team Captain
- Brazilian Jiu Jitsu
  - Black Belt awarded by Renzo Gracie

=== Amateur wrestling ===
- Junior Olympic Gold Medalist

== Mixed martial arts record ==
Professional record breakdown
4 matches	3 wins	1 loss
By knockout	0	1
By submission	2	0
By decision	1	0

Res.	Record	Opponent	Method	Event	Date	Round	Time	Location	Notes
Loss	3-1	B.J. Penn	TKO (strikes)	UFC 37	May 10, 2002	2	3:23	Louisiana, United States	UFC debut.
Win	3-0	Anthony Britton	Submission (kimura)	International Fighting Federation - Rumble Down South	March 10, 2000	1	10:24		
Win	2-0	Thomas Denny	Submission (armbar)	HFP - Holiday Fight Party	December 11, 1999	1	1:10		
Win	1-0	Rob Drouin	Decision	CSO - Calhoun Submission Open	May 15, 1999	1	30:00	Georgia, United States	
