= Rodrigo Gracie =

Brazilian Brazilian jiu-jitsu practitioner and mixed martial arts fighter

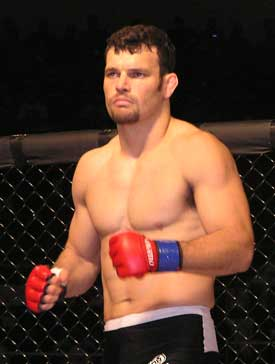
- Born: March 11, 1974 (age 52); Rio de Janeiro, Brazil
- Height: 6 ft 0 in (1.83 m)
- Weight: 185 lb (84 kg; 13.2 st)
- Division: Middleweight; Light Heavyweight
- Style: MMA, Brazilian jiu-jitsu, Submission wrestling,
- Stance: Orthodox
- Fighting out of: Palos Verdes, California, United States
- Team: Rodrigo Gracie Jiu-Jitsu
- Rank: 7th degree coral belt in Gracie Jiu-Jitsu

Mixed martial arts record
- Total: 9
- Wins: 6
- By submission: 2
- By decision: 4
- Losses: 2
- By decision: 2
- Draws: 1

Other information
- Website: http://www.rodrigogracie.com
- Mixed martial arts record from Sherdog

Rodrigo Gracie
Medal record

Representing Brazil

Grappling

ADCC Submission Wrestling World Championship
Gold medal – first place	1998 - Abu Dhabi	-87 kg

Rodrigo Gracie (born March 11, 1974) is a Brazilian retired mixed martial artist and Brazilian jiu-jitsu practitioner. A member of the Gracie family, Rodrigo is a 7th Degree Coral Belt in Gracie Jiu-Jitsu and a Gold Medalist in the 1998 ADCC Submission Wrestling World Championship. While competing in PRIDE Fighting Championships, Gracie was ranked amongst the top Middleweight fighters from 2003 to 2004 due to an undefeated streak with consecutive victories over Hayato Sakurai, Daiju Takase, Yuki Sasaki, and Daijiro Matsui.

== Biography ==
A member of the Gracie family of Brazil. He is the son of Jiu-Jitsu Grandmaster Reylson Gracie and grandson of the founder of Gracie Jiu-Jitsu, Carlos Gracie. Rodrigo began training Jiu-Jitsu at the age of 4 and was awarded the black belt at the age of 18 under his father. He then came to the United States to teach at his father's academy in California. A few years later, he went to New York City to train and work with his cousin Renzo Gracie.

Looking for new challenges and opportunities Rodrigo moved to Los Angeles, California, where he was welcomed by his cousin Royce Gracie. Rodrigo and Royce have started to train together as well as spend a lot of time as a family. Gracie is the head instructor at the Rodrigo Gracie Academy in Palos Verdes, California. Rodrigo also travels conducting seminars all over the world and in some of the "Royce Gracie Jiu-Jitsu Networks".

== Books ==
Gracie has co-written three instructional books on Brazilian jiu-jitsu with author Kid Peligro; “Brazilian Jiu-Jitsu No Holds Barred!: Fighting Techniques”, “Brazilian Jiu-Jitsu: The Path to the Black Belt”, and “The Complete Guide to Gracie Jiu-Jitsu”.

== Championships and accomplishments ==
=== Submission grappling ===
- ADCC Submission Wrestling World Championship
  - ADCC Submission Wrestling World Championship Gold Medalist - 1998
- North American Grappling Association
  - 4-Time North American Grappling Association Champion
- Brazilian Jiu Jitsu
  - 7th Degree Coral Belt in Gracie Jiu Jitsu

=== Mixed martial arts ===
- PRIDE Fighting Championships
  - Undefeated in PRIDE Fighting Championships (4-0)
- K-1 Heros
  - Hero's 2006 Light Heavyweight Grand Prix Quarterfinalist
- MARS Japan
  - MARS World Grand Prix Finalist

== Mixed martial arts record ==
Professional record breakdown
9 matches	6 wins	2 losses
By submission	2	0
By decision	4	2
Draws	1	

Res.	Record	Opponent	Method	Event	Date	Round	Time	Location	Notes
Loss	6–2–1	Shungo Oyama	Decision (majority)	Hero's 6	August 5, 2006	2	5:00	Tokyo, Japan	Hero's 2006 Light Heavyweight Grand Prix Quarterfinal.
Draw	6–1–1	Hidetaka Monma	Draw	MARS World Grand Prix	February 4, 2006	3	5:00	Tokyo, Japan	
Win	6–1	Kiuma Kunioku	Decision (unanimous)	Hero's 2	July 6, 2005	2	5:00	Tokyo, Japan	
Loss	5–1	B.J. Penn	Decision (unanimous)	Rumble on the Rock 6	November 20, 2004	3	5:00	Honolulu, Hawaii, United States	
Win	5–0	Hayato Sakurai	Decision (unanimous)	PRIDE Bushido 2	February 15, 2004	2	5:00	Yokohama, Japan	
Win	4–0	Daiju Takase	Decision (unanimous)	PRIDE Bushido 1	October 5, 2003	2	5:00	Saitama, Saitama, Japan	
Win	3–0	Yuki Sasaki	Decision (split)	PRIDE 24	December 23, 2002	3	5:00	Fukuoka Prefecture, Japan	
Win	2–0	Daijiro Matsui	Technical Submission (guillotine choke)	PRIDE 19	February 24, 2002	3	0:28	Saitama, Saitama, Japan	
Win	1–0	Kyle DeMello	Submission (arm-triangle choke)	Vengeance at the Vanderbilt 10	November 10, 2000	1	0:34	Plainview, New York, United States	
