= Robson Gracie =

Brazilian martial artist (1935–2023)

Carlos Robson Gracie Sr.
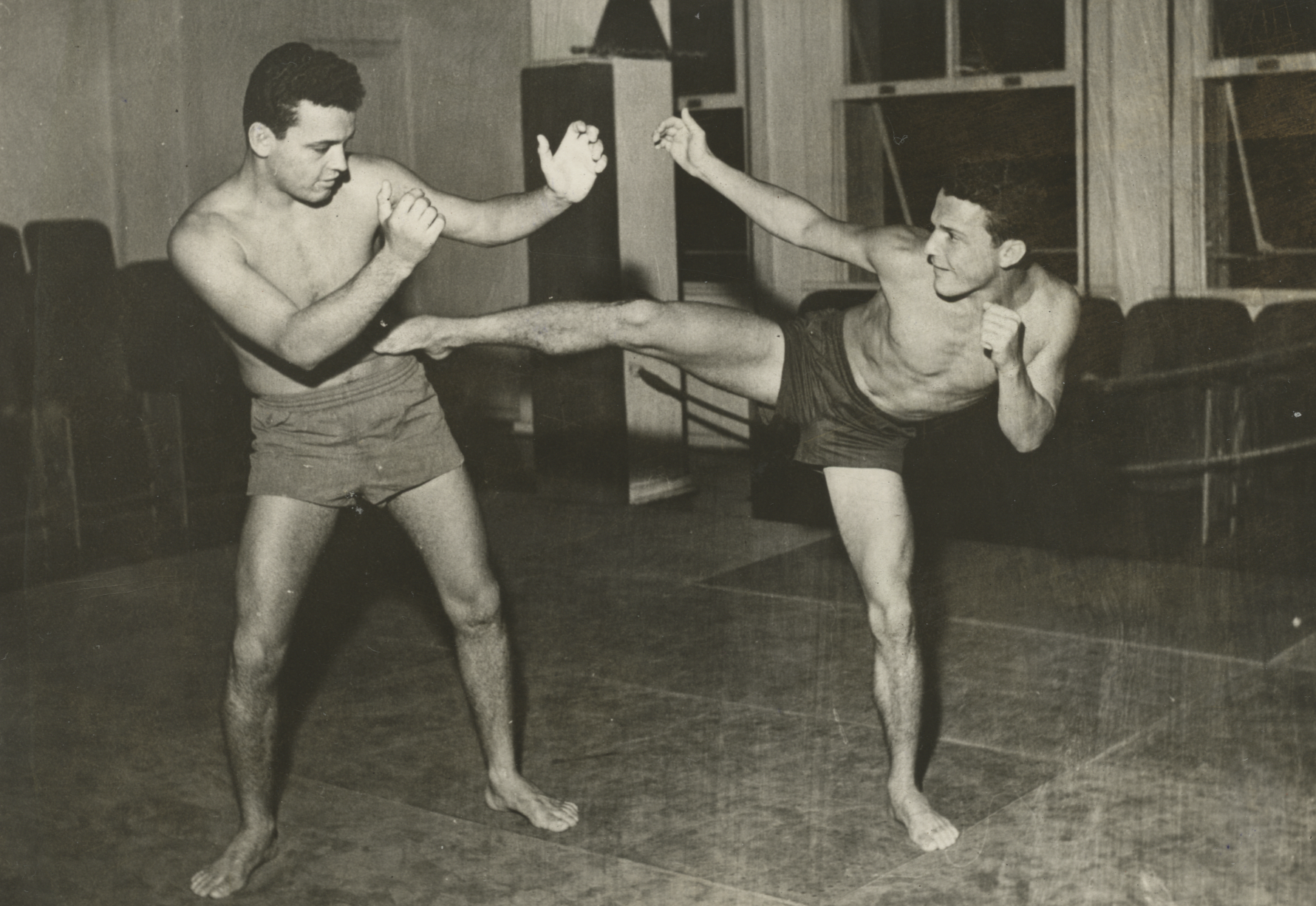
- Born: 16 January 1935
- Died: 28 April 2023 (aged 88); Rio de Janeiro, Brazil
- Nationality: Brazilian
- Style: Brazilian Jiu-Jitsu
- Teachers: Carlos Gracie, Helio Gracie
- Rank: 9th deg. BJJ red belt (under Helio Gracie)

Other information
- Notable relatives: Kyra Gracie, Neiman Gracie (grandchildren)
- Notable students: Renzo Gracie, Ralph Gracie, Ryan Gracie

Carlos Robson Gracie Sr. (Portuguese: [ˈʁɔbsõ ˈɡɾejsi]; 16 January 1935 – 28 April 2023) was a Brazilian martial artist. The second son of Carlos Gracie, Gracie was a 9th degree red belt in Brazilian Jiu-Jitsu, affording him the title of Grandmaster.

== Career ==
Robson Gracie learned martial arts from his father, Carlos Gracie, and his uncle Helio Gracie. In the 1950s, Robson competed in Vale Tudo competitions. His début mixed martial arts fight was against Artur Emidio in April 1957. During the fight, Gracie submitted his opponent but refused to release him until the referee pulled them apart. Despite his small stature, incidents like this were to characterize Gracie's professional life as a tenacious fighter. Gracie lived and taught in Rio de Janeiro, Brazil where he was the president of the Jiu-Jitsu Federation of Rio de Janeiro.

== Political affiliations ==
In the 1960s, Gracie served as a bodyguard to Leonel Brizola, the brother-in-law of the then President of Brazil, João Goulart. His political affiliations placed him under the scrutiny of the military regime, following the 1964 Brazilian coup d'état. His assistance to the Marxist guerrilla organization Ação Libertadora Nacional led to his arrest, and the arrest of several members of his family, by the Brazilian Secret Service. Gracie's wife, Vera Lucia, made representations to the Brazilian military government to release her husband which resulted in her own arrest; however, she was quickly released.

On 25 October 2018, shortly before the second round of the 2018 Brazilian general election, Robson Gracie handed an honorary black belt to the future President of Brazil, Jair Bolsonaro, who has never trained in jiu-jitsu.

== Death ==
Gracie died in Rio de Janeiro on 28 April 2023, at the age of 88. In November 2023, it was announced that a public landmark in Rio de Janeiro would be named after him to honor his contributions to the city.

== Documentary ==
On July 6, 2023, it was announced that ESPN Films is producing a documentary series on the Gracie family directed by Chris Fuller and produced by Greg O'Connor and Guy Ritchie.
