= Crucifix position =

Grappling position

- A choke from the crucifix being demonstrated by Eduardo de Lima
- Classification: Chokehold
- Style: Jujutsu

The crucifix position is a ground grappling position that involves being perpendicularly behind the opponent, chest against back, and controlling the opponent's arms. One of the opponent's arms is controlled using the legs, and the other using the arms, hence effectively putting the opponent in a position resembling a crucifix. A top variation can also be applied from side control.

This position allows for strikes to the head and neck (with arms and legs), as well as both gi and no-gi submission holds (both chokes and locks), most notably a collar strangle called the crucifix choke (in Judo known as jigoku jime, 地獄絞, "hell strangle"). It is also possible to apply the crucifix position in such a way that a crucifix neck crank can be applied.
