= Ralph Gracie =

Brazilian martial artist (born 1971)

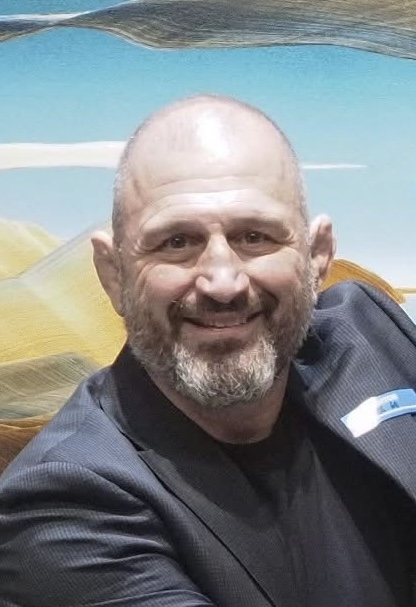
- Gracie in 2026
- Born: May 25, 1971 (age 55); Rio de Janeiro, Brazil
- Other names: The Pitbull
- Height: 5 ft 9 in (1.75 m)
- Weight: 155 lb (70 kg; 11.1 st)
- Division: Lightweight
- Style: Brazilian Jiu-Jitsu
- Team: Ralph Gracie Jiu-Jitsu.
- Rank: 7th deg. black belt in BJJ under Carlos Gracie Jr.

Mixed martial arts record
- Total: 7
- Wins: 6
- By submission: 5
- By decision: 1
- Losses: 1
- By knockout: 1

Other information
- Website: www.ralphgracie.com
- Mixed martial arts record from Sherdog

Ralph Gracie (born May 25, 1971) is a retired Brazilian professional mixed martial artist and jiu-jitsu black belt. A member of the famed Gracie family, he is the son of Robson Gracie and the brother of 11 Gracies, including Charles Gracie, Renzo Gracie and the late Ryan Gracie.

== Early life ==
Ralph Gracie was born on 25 May 1971, in Rio de Janeiro, Brazil. Like most members of the Gracie family, he started practicing Brazilian jiu-jitsu from a young age, training extensively with his uncle Carlos Gracie Jr. who awarded him his black belt when Gracie was twenty one. In the early days of Gracie Barra, he became a strong representative of the team in many local tournaments. In the 1990s Gracie moved to the United States at the invitation of his cousin Cesar Gracie.

== Personal life ==
Ralph Gracie is a member of the Gracie family, a prominent Brazilian family known for its foundational role in the development and global spread of Brazilian jiu-jitsu.

He is the son of Robson Gracie, a key figure in the second generation of the Gracie family, and part of a lineage that includes numerous practitioners and instructors who contributed to the international expansion of the sport.

== Mixed martial arts career ==
Gracie's 1995 American debut was featured in the short-lived Battlecade Extreme Fighting events. Gracie won fights versus Makoto Muraoka, Steve Nelson, and Ali Mihoubi, the longest of which lasted a minute and thirty-four seconds. In sharp contrast to the typical "passive" Gracie approach, Gracie's aggressive and often brutal approach earned him the nickname of "The Pitbull".

In 2003, Gracie ended his absence from fighting to pit his skills against modern MMA fighters, earning a decision win over Dokonjonosuke Mishima. The following year, he suffered a loss to Takanori Gomi, who stopped Gracie in six seconds with knee strikes to the head in what would be Gracie's last MMA fight.

Upon retirement, Gracie held a record of six wins and one loss in sanctioned fights. He holds a fifth degree black belt in Brazilian Jiu-Jitsu, and has won several BJJ tournaments.

== Academies ==
Gracie owns and operates a series of martial arts academies in California, as well as Florida, (specializing in Brazilian Jiu-Jitsu). Gracie owns eight academies in Northern California (Berkeley, Richmond, Dublin, Sacramento, Santa Clara, San Francisco, San Jose, and Vacaville) and two in Southern California (Anaheim and Chino Hills); with the largest being the San Francisco Academy. Most recently, the academy in Richmond opened and instructed by Igor Estrella. Notable instructor, and 6th-degree black belt, Luis Eduardo Fraga, has been head instructor at the Berkeley Academy since 2007.

Gracie taught former UFC welterweight and lightweight champion, B.J. Penn, when he first came to California from Hawaii. Gracie also taught other prominent black belts such as Kurt Osiander, the Camarillo brothers, Scot Nelson, and more.

In late 2016, Ralph Gracie Florida academy opened in the city of Port Orange, Volusia county, under 5th-degree black belt Regis Calixto.

In early 2021, Ralph Gracie Jiu-Jitsu issued a public statement on an incident concerning the head instructor at an affiliate gym, whereby he harassed the parent of a former student and left a voicemail including threats and a racial slur.

== Championships and accomplishments ==
- Extreme Fighting Championship
  - EFC Lightweight Championship (1 time, first, only)
  - 1995 EFC Lightweight Tournament Winner

== Attack on Flavio Almeida ==
On 15 December 2018, Gracie assaulted 5-time World Champion Flavio Almeida, Gracie Barra’s North America Executive Director, elbowing him in the face on the sidelines of the 2018 World No-Gi Championships in Anaheim. According to prosecutors, after Almeida was knocked unconscious to the ground, Gracie, and one of his student Lincoln Pereira, continued to kick him in the head. Almeida reportedly suffered serious injuries as a result including a concussion and two broken teeth. The attack allegedly came from Gracie not wanting Almeida to set up a Gracie Barra franchise near one of his schools.

Gracie fled to Brazil after the assault and a warrant from the Orange County District Attorney's office was issued for his arrest in April 2019. Gracie failed to appear to four consecutive court appearances. A pretrial date was set for December 8, 2020, and a jury trial date was for 2021. Gracie pleaded guilty to a felony assault charge for the unprovoked attack and he was sentenced to 180 days in jail, three years formal probation, a $50,000 fine and anger management. He was subsequently released after serving three months of his sentence, the reason for his early release being unclear. According to his court statement, Gracie felt "tremendous remorse" for attacking Almeida.

As a consequence of the attack, and in the wake of the video evidence, Gracie received a lifetime ban from the IBJJF, the largest Brazilian jiu-jitsu organization in the world led by his uncle Carlos Gracie Jr. Gracie is forbidden to compete, act as a coach, or participate in another IBJJF event for the rest of his life.

== Mixed martial arts record ==
Professional record breakdown
7 matches	6 wins	1 loss
By knockout	1	1
By submission	4	0
By decision	1	0

Res.	Record	Opponent	Method	Event	Date	Round	Time	Location	Notes
Loss	6–1	Takanori Gomi	KO (knees)	PRIDE Bushido 3	May 23, 2004	1	0:06	Yokohama, Japan	
Win	6–0	Dokonjonosuke Mishima	Decision (unanimous)	PRIDE Bushido 1	October 5, 2003	2	5:00	Saitama, Japan	
Win	5–0	Steve Nelson	Submission (armbar)	Unified Shoot Wrestling Federation 11	September 1, 1998	1	13:14	Amarillo, Texas, United States	
Win	4–0	Ali Mihoubi	Submission (armbar)	Extreme Fighting 3	October 18, 1996	1	1:34	Tulsa, Oklahoma, United States	
Win	3–0	Steve Nelson	TKO (submission to punches)	Extreme Fighting 2	April 28, 1996	1	0:44	Montreal, Canada	
Win	2–0	Makoto Muraoka	Submission (rear-naked choke)	Extreme Fighting 1	November 18, 1995	1	0:40	Wilmington, North Carolina, United States	Won EFC Lightweight Tournament and EFC Lightweight Championship
Win	1–0	Geraldo Silva	Technical Submission (rear-naked choke)	Desafio – Gracie Vale Tudo	January 1, 1992	1	0:25	Brazil	

== Vida pública ==
Além de sua atuação como lutador e instrutor, Ralph Gracie tornou-se conhecido por sua participação em eventos e academias nos Estados Unidos, contribuindo para a difusão do jiu-jítsu brasileiro internacionalmente.
