= Ryan Gracie =

Brazilian Brazilian jiu-jitsu practitioner and mixed martial arts fighter

- Born: August 13, 1974; Rio de Janeiro, Brazil
- Died: December 15, 2007 (aged 33); São Paulo, Brazil
- Other names: The Pitbull; Bad Boy Gracie; Crazy Brutal
- Height: 5 ft 9 in (1.75 m)
- Weight: 185 lb (84 kg; 13.2 st)
- Division: Middleweight
- Style: Brazilian Jiu-Jitsu, Gracie Jiu-Jitsu, Vale Tudo
- Team: Ryan Gracie Team
- Rank: 4th degree black belt in Brazilian jiu-jitsu

Mixed martial arts record
- Total: 7
- Wins: 5
- By knockout: 2
- By submission: 2
- By decision: 1
- Losses: 2
- By knockout: 1
- By decision: 1

Other information
- Notable relatives: Gracie Family
- Mixed martial arts record from Sherdog

Ryan Gracie
Medal record

Pan-American Championship
Gold medal – first place	1998 – California, USA	-94 kg

Brazilian National Championship
Gold medal – first place	1997 Rio de Janeiro, Brazil	-94kg

Ryan Gracie (August 13, 1974 – December 15, 2007) was a Brazilian mixed martial artist with a black belt in Brazilian Jiu-Jitsu. He was a member of the Gracie family and a grandson of Carlos Gracie.

== Career ==
Ryan trained with his brothers, Renzo Gracie and Ralph Gracie; the latter often served as his cornerman. He also trained Pancrase fighter Gabriel Vella and jiu-jitsu world champion Fabio Leopoldo while in Brazil.

Gracie had seven fights in the PRIDE organization, with his first at PRIDE 10 in 2000 and his most recent at PRIDE Shockwave 2004. PRIDE billed Ryan as the "bad boy" of the family who reputedly gained experience fighting in the streets of Brazil. In interviews in 2004, Gracie expressed a strong interest in fighting Kazushi Sakuraba and Hidehiko Yoshida. Sakuraba, known as the "Gracie Hunter" for his many victories over the Gracie family, defeated Ryan earlier with a decision win in 2000.

Ryan was the leader and head coach of Gracie São Paulo, one of the largest jiu-jitsu associations in Brazil, with affiliated schools spread over the world. Supported by his cousins Carlos Russo, Daniel Simões, and Renzo Gracie, the academy is home to several world champions.

== Personal life ==
He was the youngest son of the Brazilian Jiu-Jitsu Master Robson Gracie. On December 8, 2001, his only son, Rayron Gracie, was born. Ryan's brothers are Charles Gracie, Renzo Gracie, and Ralph Gracie.

On January 30, 2021, Ryan's son, Rayron, released a short documentary titled Letters to my Father, which reveals his experiences growing up without his father through a series of letters he decided to write to Ryan throughout his teenage years.

In October 2005, Gracie suffered an accidental gunshot wound to the leg while reaching into a closet in his sister's house in Rio de Janeiro, according to a report by GracieMag.com. He was hospitalized and returned to stable condition after receiving a blood transfusion.

== Death ==
On December 15, 2007, at 7:00 A.M., Ryan Gracie was found dead in a jail cell in São Paulo, Brazil. At approximately 1:30 A.M. that day, Gracie had been arrested for stealing and crashing a car and attempting to hijack a motorcycle. The owner of the motorcycle hit Gracie on the head, and Gracie was detained by several cyclists until police arrived. A toxicological examination at the Medical Legal Institute was conducted, after which Gracie was transported to the police station. While in jail, Gracie's wife called psychiatrist Dr. Sabino Ferreira de Faria to attend to him. The psychiatrist was later accused of medical negligence by over prescribing medication and causing Gracie's death. Ferreira was later sentenced to two years of community service for recklessness. The doctor was with Gracie most of the night, and was notified of Ryan Gracie's death as he was driving home. Gracie was found alone and slumped into a corner when police were doing a routine check of the jail cells.

== Mixed martial arts record ==
Professional record breakdown
7 matches	5 wins	2 losses
By knockout	2	1
By submission	2	0
By decision	1	1

Res.	Record	Opponent	Method	Event	Date	Round	Time	Location	Notes
Win	5–2	Yoji Anjo	Submission (armbar)	PRIDE Shockwave 2004	December 31, 2004	1	8:33	Saitama, Japan	
Win	4–2	Ikuhisa Minowa	Decision (split)	PRIDE Bushido 3	May 23, 2004	2	5:00	Yokohama, Japan	
Win	3–2	Kazuhiro Hamanaka	KO (soccer kicks)	PRIDE Bushido 1	October 5, 2003	1	7:37	Saitama, Japan	
Win	2–2	Shungo Oyama	Technical Submission (armbar)	PRIDE 22	September 29, 2002	1	1:37	Nagoya, Japan	
Loss	1–2	Tokimitsu Ishizawa	TKO (injury)	PRIDE 15	July 29, 2001	1	4:51	Saitama, Japan	
Loss	1–1	Kazushi Sakuraba	Decision (unanimous)	Pride 12 - Cold Fury	December 23, 2000	1	10:00	Saitama, Japan	
Win	1–0	Tokimitsu Ishizawa	KO (punches)	Pride 10 - Return of the Warriors	August 27, 2000	1	2:16	Tokorozawa, Japan	
