= Jason Guida =

American mixed martial arts fighter

- Born: August 4, 1977 (age 49); Mokena, Illinois, U.S.
- Height: 5 ft 10 in (1.78 m)
- Weight: 214 lb (97 kg; 15.3 st)
- Division: Heavyweight; Light Heavyweight
- Reach: 77 in (196 cm)
- Stance: Orthodox
- Fighting out of: Schaumburg, Illinois
- Team: Midwest Training Center (2003-present); Jackson's Submission Fighting (2011-2014; occasionally); Team Alpha Male (2016)
- Rank: Blue belt in Brazilian Jiu-Jitsu
- Wrestling: NJCAA Wrestling
- Years active: 2003-2011; 2014

Mixed martial arts record
- Total: 49
- Wins: 19
- By knockout: 7
- By submission: 9
- By decision: 3
- Losses: 28
- By knockout: 7
- By submission: 7
- By decision: 14
- No contests: 2

Other information
- Occupation: Oil Refinery Operator - Enbridge (2011-present)
- Notable relatives: Clay Guida, brother
- Notable school: William Rainey Harper College (class of 2001)
- Mixed martial arts record from Sherdog

Jason Guida (born August 4, 1977) is an American former professional mixed martial artist who last competed for Bellator. A professional competitor from 2003 until 2014, he also fought for EliteXC, the WEC, KSW, Adrenaline MMA and World Extreme Fighting. Jason is the older brother of Ultimate Fighting Championship veteran Clay Guida.

== Background ==
Born and raised in Illinois, Guida began wrestling in elementary school, he is four years older than his brother Clay. Both wrestled at Johnsburg High School and William Rainey Harper College. They both won a NAIA national title in 2001.

== Mixed martial arts career ==
=== Early career ===
Guida only had two amateur fights before turning professional in 2003.

=== The Ultimate Fighter ===
Guida appeared on The Ultimate Fighter: Team Nogueira vs. Team Mir and was eliminated in the first episode for failing to make the 206 lb weight limit by one pound.

=== Independent promotions ===
Following this, as a last minute replacement for Ken Shamrock, Guida faced former WWE pro wrestling star Bobby Lashley. Guida lost via unanimous decision. Before his bout with Lashley, he and Guida got in a scuffle at a pre-fight press conference that had to be broken up by Roy Jones Jr.

Guida then suffered losses to UFC veteran Jeremy Horn and top Chechen contender Mamed Khalidov, but overcame his losing streak with a knockout win over former UFC fighter Logan Clark, ending the fight with a barrage of punches in the first round in Clark's hometown of Rochester, Minnesota.

In 2009 Jason was set to take on 2011 ADCC World Championship Nottingham Gold Medalist and former UFC fighter, Vinny Magalhães in the main event of "Carolina Crown 2" as a late replacement for Lance Evans, the brother of UFC star Rashad Evans. He later dropped out of the fight due to a lower back injury sustained during training, he was replaced by Bellator fighter Chris Davis.

In 2010, Guida then tried out for The Ultimate Fighter 12 in the Light Heavyweight division but was unsuccessful when the Light Heavyweights were cut before the season started in favor of a Lightweight only season.

=== Bellator ===
Guida stepped in as a replacement and fought Justin Lemke at Bellator 29 in a 210 lb catchweight bout and his Bellator debut. Guida weighed in 5 lbs over the catchweight limit and the fight was changed to a 215 lb catchweight bout.

In 2011, Jason joined his brother Clay and started training under top mixed martial arts trainer, Greg Jackson, in an attempt to reinvent his fighting career.

On November 16, 2012 Guida was scheduled to make his return against former UFC veteran Jason Brilz in the main event of Disorderly Conduct 13. The fight was later scrapped due to an injury Jason suffered training with Greg Jackson's MMA.

Guida fought Anthony Gomez at Bellator 112 on March 14, 2014, after his original opponent Sean Salmon pulled out for undisclosed reasons. He lost via unanimous decision.

== Controversies ==
Guida was involved in a backstage scuffle with former UFC veteran Sean McCorkle at UFC 123 in which members of Guida's camp and Guida himself warned McCorkle that Jason was a made man.

In 2016, Guida yet again was involved in a backstage scuffle, this time with UFC veteran Nate Diaz at UFC 199 after his brother Clay lost his fight against Brian Ortega via knockout, Jason became visibly upset after the end of Clay's fight before approaching Diaz backstage as he was preparing to enter a Q&A interview about his main event fight with Conor McGregor before Jason suddenly bull rushed Nate and pressed him up against a wall before Justin Buchholz and UFC staff intervened and separated the two of them.

== Personal life ==
Jason and his girlfriend had a daughter in 2009.

== Mixed martial arts record ==
Professional record breakdown
49 matches	19 wins	28 losses
By knockout	7	7
By submission	9	7
By decision	3	14
No contests	2	

Res.	Record	Opponent	Method	Event	Date	Round	Time	Location	Notes
Loss	19–28 (2)	Anthony Gomez	Decision (unanimous)	Bellator 112	March 14, 2014	3	5:00	Hammond, Indiana	Catchweight (215 lbs) bout.
Win	19–27 (2)	Keith Richards	TKO (punches)	C-3 Fights Fall Brawl	October 22, 2011	1	2:47	Newkirk, Oklahoma, United States	
Loss	18–27 (2)	Sam Alvey	Decision (split)	NAFC: Bad Blood	November 24, 2010	3	5:00	Milwaukee, Wisconsin, United States	
Loss	18–26 (2)	Nick Rossborough	Decision (unanimous)	Chicago Cagefighting Championship	October 16, 2010	3	5:00	Chicago, Illinois, United States	
Loss	18–25 (2)	Justin Lemke	Decision (split)	Bellator 29	September 16, 2010	3	5:00	Milwaukee, Wisconsin, United States	Catchweight (215 lbs) bout.
Loss	18–24 (2)	Jeff Monson	Submission (rear naked choke)	Elite Promotions: Monson vs Guida	August 21, 2010	2	3:04	Pompano Beach, Florida, United States	Heavyweight bout.
Loss	18–23 (2)	Mark George	TKO (injury)	PP: The Real Deal	January 15, 2010	2	1:33	Columbus, Georgia, United States	Heavyweight bout.
Win	18–22 (2)	Logan Clark	KO (punches)	Fight Nation: Guida vs. Clark	October 3, 2009	1	0:07	Rochester, Minnesota, United States	
Loss	17–22 (2)	Jeremy Horn	Submission (arm-triangle choke)	Arena Rumble: Guida vs. Horn	September 12, 2009	1	4:03	Spokane, Washington, United States	
Loss	17–21 (2)	Bobby Lashley	Decision (unanimous)	SRP: March Badness	March 21, 2009	3	5:00	Pensacola, Florida, United States	
Loss	17–20 (2)	Matt Sassolino	Decision (split)	C-3: Domination	November 22, 2008	3	5:00	Hammond, Indiana, United States	For the C-3 Light Heavyweight Championship.
Loss	17–19 (2)	Mamed Khalidov	TKO (strikes)	ShoXC: Elite Challenger Series	October 10, 2008	2	4:53	Hammond, Indiana, United States	
Loss	17–18 (2)	Mike Russow	Submission (guillotine choke)	Adrenaline MMA: Guida vs Russow	June 14, 2008	1	2:13	Hoffman Estates, Illinois, United States	Heavyweight bout.
Win	17–17 (2)	Cristiano Machado	Submission (guillotine choke)	Costa Rica Fights 9	March 16, 2007	2	0:18	Limón, Costa Rica	
Win	16–17 (2)	Mike Van Meer	TKO (punches)	CFC 2: Explosion	March 10, 2007	1	0:40	Tinley Park, Illinois, United States	
Loss	15–17 (2)	Travis Wiuff	Decision (unanimous)	XFO 14: Xtreme Fighting	December 9, 2006	3	5:00	Peoria, Illinois, United States	Heavyweight bout.
Loss	15–16 (2)	Terry Martin	KO (punch)	XFO 13: Operation Beatdown	November 11, 2006	3	0:08	Peoria, Illinois, United States	For the XFO Light Heavyweight Championship.
Win	15–15 (2)	Antony Rea	Decision (unanimous)	Absolute Fighting Championships 18	August 26, 2006	3	5:00	Boca Raton, Florida, United States	Catchweight (218 lbs) bout.
Loss	14–15 (2)	Alex Stiebling	Decision (split)	WEC 22: The Hitmen	July 28, 2006	3	5:00	Lemoore, California, United States	
Loss	14–14 (2)	Marvin Eastman	Decision (unanimous)	WEF: Orleans Arena	June 10, 2006	5	5:00	Las Vegas, Nevada, United States	For the WEF Light Heavyweight Championship.
Win	14–13 (2)	Armondo Mena	TKO (punches)	Costa Rica Fights 6	May 20, 2006	1	2:54	Limón, Costa Rica	
Win	13–13 (2)	Allen Vindas	Submission (armbar)	Costa Rica Fights 5	April 10, 2006	1	1:03	Limón, Costa Rica	
Win	12–13 (2)	Marvin Eastman	Submission (guillotine choke)	WEF: Orleans Arena	April 1, 2006	3	2:07	Las Vegas, Nevada, United States	
Win	11–13 (2)	William Hill	Decision (majority)	Total Fight Challenge 5	March 9, 2006	3	5:00	Hammond, Indiana, United States	
Loss	10–13 (2)	Vernon White	TKO (doctor stoppage)	WEC 18: Unfinished Business	January 13, 2006	1	5:00	Lemoore, California, United States	
Loss	10–12 (2)	Adam Maciejewski	Decision (split)	Combat: Do Fighting Challenge 5	December 17, 2005	3	5:00	Hammond, Illinois, United States	
Loss	10–11 (2)	Thales Leites	Submission (armbar)	Ultimate Warriors Combat 1	December 10, 2005	1	1:38	Honolulu, Hawaii, United States	
Win	10–10 (2)	Pat Stano	KO (punch)	Euphoria: USA vs. Japan	November 5, 2005	1	3:05	Atlantic City, New Jersey, United States	
Loss	9–10 (2)	Damir Mirenic	Decision	KSW IV: Konfrontacja	September 10, 2005	3	5:00	Warsaw, Poland	Openweight bout.
Loss	9–9 (2)	Jacek Buczko	Decision	KSW IV: Konfrontacja	September 10, 2005	3	5:00	Warsaw, Poland	
Win	9–8 (2)	Ed Meyers	TKO (broken nose)	Combat: Do Fighting Challenge 4	August 13, 2005	1	0:19	Hammond, Illinois, United States	
Win	8–8 (2)	Ron Faircloth	Submission (guillotine choke)	Madtown Throwdown 4	July 9, 2005	1	0:40	Madison, Wisconsin, United States	
Loss	7–8 (2)	Eric Schafer	Submission (triangle choke)	XFO 6: Judgement Day	June 25, 2005	1	3:49	Lakemoor, Illinois, United States	
Win	7–7 (2)	Leo Vargas	TKO (submission to punches)	Combat: Do Fighting Challenge 3	May 14, 2005	1	4:40	Hammond, Illinois, United States	
Win	6–7 (2)	Ron Fields	Technical Submission (rear-naked choke)	SuperBrawl 40: Guida vs. Fields 2	April 30, 2005	3	4:05	Hammond, Illinois, United States	
Win	5–7 (2)	Atte Backman	Submission (guillotine choke)	Fight Festival 14	April 9, 2005	1	1:54	Tampere, Finland	
Win	4–7 (2)	Ron Fields	Submission (rear-naked choke)	XFO 5: Repent	March 19, 2005	3	3:10	Peoria, Illinois, United States	Catchweight (196 lbs) bout.
Loss	3–7 (2)	Jorge Ortiz	Decision (split)	MMA Mexico 1	December 17, 2004	3	5:00	Mexico City, Mexico	Catchweight (190 lbs) bout.
Win	3–6 (2)	Mark Wallen	Decision (split)	XFO 4: Asylum	December 3, 2004	3	5:00	McHenry, Illinois, United States	
Loss	2–6 (2)	Tom Murphy	TKO (submission to punches)	Main Event: Indiana	November 6, 2004	3	3:46	Gary, Indiana, United States	
Win	2–5 (2)	Justin Hutter	Submission (arm-triangle choke)	Do Fighting Combat 1	October 23, 2004	1	0:45	Hammond, Illinois, United States	
Win	1–5 (2)	Leo Sylvest	Submission (armbar)	XFO 3: Guida vs. Sylvest	October 2, 2004	1	2:55	Lake Geneva, Wisconsin, United States	
Loss	0–5 (2)	Rory Markham	Submission (armbar)	XFO 2: New Blood	June 26, 2004	2	0:58	Fontana-on-Geneva Lake, Wisconsin, United States	
Loss	0–4 (2)	Steve Evan-Dau	TKO (doctor's stoppage)	XFO 1: The Kickoff	March 14, 2004	2	1:52	Lake Geneva, Wisconsin, United States	Guida could no longer see.
Loss	0–3 (2)	Nate Homme	Submission (triangle choke)	XKK 4: Clash In Curtiss	March 7, 2004	3	3:35	Curtiss, Wisconsin, United States	
Loss	0–2 (2)	Jason Veach	TKO (cut)	Ironheart Crown	November 22, 2003	1	5:00	Hammond, Indiana, United States	Middleweight debut.
NC	0–1 (2)	Jorge Ortiz	No Contest (Pre-Fight Foul)	Ultimate Fighting Mexico	November 15, 2003	1	0:00	Monterrey, Mexico	Guida committed foul before first round.
NC	0–1 (1)	Steve Evan-Dau	No Contest (illegal strikes)	Extreme Challenge 4	October 12, 2003	3	2:51	Lakewood, Illinois, United States	Both fighters threw illegal strikes before a restart of position.
Loss	0–1	Adrian Serrano	Decision	Silverback Classic 17	July 26, 2003	3	5:00	Ottawa, Illinois, United States	
