= Travis Wiuff =

American mixed martial arts fighter (born 1978)

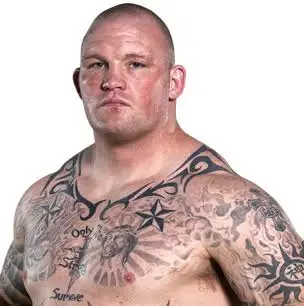
- Born: Travis Wiuff; March 15, 1978 (age 48); Owatonna, Minnesota, United States
- Other names: Diesel
- Height: 6 ft 3 in (1.91 m)
- Weight: 264.5 lb (120.0 kg; 18.89 st)
- Division: Light Heavyweight; Heavyweight; Super Heavyweight
- Reach: 74 in (188 cm)
- Stance: Orthodox
- Fighting out of: Rochester, Minnesota, United States
- Team: Lion's Lair (2001–2002); Menne Combat Academy (2002–2006); Elite Performance (formerly); Miletich Fighting Systems (formerly)
- Rank: Brown belt in Brazilian jiu-jitsu under Mario Roberto
- Wrestling: NJCAA All-American
- Years active: 2001–present

Mixed martial arts record
- Total: 101
- Wins: 78
- By knockout: 39
- By submission: 12
- By decision: 27
- Losses: 22
- By knockout: 16
- By submission: 3
- By decision: 3
- No contests: 1

Other information
- University: Minnesota State University
- Mixed martial arts record from Sherdog
- Last updated on: September 30, 2023

Travis Wiuff (born March 15, 1978) is an American mixed martial artist competing in the Heavyweight division. A professional competitor since 2001 and veteran of over 100 fights, Wiuff has competed for the UFC, PRIDE, Bellator, World Victory Road, and the Quad Cities Silverbacks and San Jose Razorclaws of the IFL. He also competes in catch wrestling.

== Background ==
Wiuff is from Owatonna, Minnesota, and is of Danish and Irish descent. As his father was a professional wrestler, Wiuff also began wrestling when he was five years old, and continued through high school and college. While at Owatonna High School, he also played football. He was injured during his senior year and had to miss out on the state wrestling championship tournament despite being ranked number one in the state of Minnesota.

Wiuff continued to wrestle and also continued to play football for two years in junior college, at Rochester Technical Community College, where he was a two-time NJCAA All-American, finishing second as a heavyweight at the national championship in 1999. After junior college, Wiuff attended Minnesota State University but dropped out a year before graduating with a law enforcement degree.

== Mixed martial arts career ==
=== Early career ===
Applying for a bouncer job in his early adulthood, Wiuff bumped into Brad Kohler who tried to lure the accomplished wrestler into fighting. Over time and after several attempts, Kohler succeeded and Wiuff begun training at Kohler's gym Lion's Lair. Rapidly after starting the sport, Wiuff made his professional debut in September 2001. Over the next year, he amassed a record of 12–2 before making his debut for the Ultimate Fighting Championship.

=== Ultimate Fighting Championship ===
Wiuff made his UFC debut in November 2002 as he faced Vladimir Matyushenko at UFC 40. He lost the fight via submission due to punches late in the first round. Wiuff was released from the promotion following the loss.

=== Post-UFC release ===
Following his release from the company, Wiuff fought schedule on the independent MMA circuit. He fought 24 times over the next three years, and went 22–2.

=== Return to UFC ===
Wiuff was invited back to the UFC in April 2005 when he faced Renato Sobral at UFC 52. He lost the fight via armbar submission in the opening minute of the second round. He was again released from the promotion.

=== Independent promotions ===
Wiuff continued his fight schedule after his second UFC release fighting in more independent promotions. Before joining Bellator, he fought 39 times in the ensuing six years. He added an additional 29-9 with one no-contest to his record during this period.

Wiuff won the YAMMA Eight-Man Heavyweight Tournament as well as the IFO Light Heavyweight Championship twice, IFC Americas Cruiserweight Championship and IFC United States Light Heavyweight Championship once.

Wiuff fought Mike Kyle on May 24, 2013, at CFA 11, Wiuff lost via knockout in 21 seconds of the first round.

=== Bellator Fighting Championships ===
Wiuff signed to a contract with Bellator. He debuted in October 2011 where he defeated reigning Bellator Light Heavyweight Champion Christian M'Pumbu in a non-title superfight at Bellator 55, marking the first time a reigning Bellator Champion had lost to someone not under an ongoing contract with the promotion. Bellator signed Wiuff to a contract that December, and he returned to the promotion in March 2012 where he defeated Anthony Gomez in a unanimous decision at Bellator 60.

In the summer of 2012, Wiuff entered Bellator's Light Heavyweight Tournament. In the opening round at Bellator 71, he faced Chris Davis and won via KO in the first round. Wiuff faced Tim Carpenter in the semifinals at Bellator 72. He won the fight via unanimous decision.

On August 24, 2012, Wiuff faced Attila Vegh in the tournament finals at Bellator 73 and lost via KO in 25 seconds of round one.

On March 21, 2013, Wiuff faced Ryan Martinez at Bellator 93 in a Heavyweight bout, He lost via KO in 18 seconds of round one.

=== Independent promotions ===
Wiuff faced Brett Murphy at VCF: Countdown to War on December 31, 2013. He won the fight via unanimous decision, snapping his four fight losing streak.

Wiuff signed with the Driller Promotions organization in March 2014, and made his debut against Terry Davinney at DP: O-Town Throwdown 1 on April 12, 2014. He won the fight via first-round TKO.

He then faced Brian Heden at Driller Promotions: No Mercy 11 on May 24, 2014, for the DP Heavyweight Championship. He won the fight via first-round TKO, and won his first championship since 2009. He then faced Dallas Mitchell at Dakota FC: Beatdown 11 on June 7, 2014, which he won in a unanimous decision.

Wiuff made his first title defense on June 27, 2014, when he faced Danyelle Williams at Driller Promotions: A-Town Throwdown III. He won the fight via unanimous decision.

Wiuff then faced Chris Barnett at Inoki Genome Fight 2 on August 23, 2014. Wiuff lost the bout via TKO after being struck by a right hand from Barnett.

Wiuff faced Timothy Johnson at Dakota FC 19: Fall Brawl on October 25, 2014, for the DFC Heavyweight Championship. He was defeated via TKO due to punches in the first round.

Wiuff faced Kevin Asplund at Driller Promotions: O-Town Throwdown 2 on April 18, 2015. He won via submission in round three.

== Submission wrestling career ==
Wiuff has also competed in catch wrestling. In July 2016, he won gold in the 219 lb division at the Frank Gotch World Catch Championships in Humboldt, Iowa. Wiuff returned for the tournament's 2017 edition, which used an openweight format. He placed second, losing in the final to Curran Jacobs, who Wiuff outweighed by over 50 lbs.

In December 2023, Wiuff competed at the American Catch Wrestling Association (ACWA) US Open championships in Brea, California, winning gold in the +214 lb division.

== Personal life ==
Wiuff has two daughters. He is a special education teacher and a football and wrestling coach in the Kasson-Mantorville School District.

== Championships and accomplishments ==
=== Catch wrestling ===
- American Catch Wrestling Association
  - 2023 US Open - 1st place, over 214 lb.
- Catch Wrestling Alliance
  - 2016 Frank Gotch World Catch Championships - 1st place, 219 lb.
  - 2017 Frank Gotch World Catch Championships - 2nd place, openweight

=== Collegiate wrestling ===
- National Junior College Athletic Association
  - NJCAA Wrestling National Championships (1999) - 2nd place, heavyweight (285 lb)
  - NJCAA All-American (1999)

=== Mixed martial arts ===
- Fusion Fight League
  - FFL Heavyweight Championship (One time, current)
- Bellator Fighting Championships
  - Bellator 2012 Summer Series Light Heavyweight Tournament runner-up
- Driller Promotions
  - DP Heavyweight Championship (One time)
- YAMMA Pit Fighting
  - YAMMA 8-Man Heavyweight Tournament Winner
- International Fighting Organization
  - IFO Light Heavyweight Championship (Two times)
- International Fighting Championships
  - IFC Americas Cruiserweight Championship (One time)
  - IFC United States Light Heavyweight Championship (One time)
- International Sport Karate Association
  - ISKA MMA Light Heavyweight Championship (One time)

== Mixed martial arts record ==
Professional record breakdown
101 matches	78 wins	22 losses
By knockout	39	16
By submission	12	3
By decision	27	3
No contests	1	

Res.	Record	Opponent	Method	Event	Date	Round	Time	Location	Notes
Win	78–22 (1)	Matt Kovacs	Submission (arm-triangle choke)	Fusion Fight League: Fights Under The Lights	July 31, 2021	2	0:52	Billings, Montana, United States	Wins vacant FFL Heavyweight Championship.
Win	77–22 (1)	Jeremy Speits	Submission (arm-triangle choke)	Fusion Fight League: Fights Under The Lights 6	September 21, 2019	2	1:38	Billings, Montana, United States	
Win	76–22 (1)	JR Lugo	Decision (unanimous)	M-1 Global: Road to M-1 USA 2	April 4, 2019	3	5:00	Winterhaven, California, United States	
Loss	75–22 (1)	Greg Rebello	TKO (punches)	CES MMA 48: Rebello vs. Wiuff	February 2, 2018	1	0:23	Lincoln, Rhode Island, United States	For the vacant CES Heavyweight Championship.
Win	75–21 (1)	Ron Carter	Submission (triangle choke)	KOTC: Equalizer	October 15, 2016	1	4:36	Lac du Flambeau, Wisconsin, United States	
Loss	74–21 (1)	Brian Heden	KO (punch)	Driller Promotions: No Mercy 5	April 21, 2016	1	0:33	Detroit Lakes, Minnesota, United States	Lost the DP Heavyweight Championship.
Win	74–20 (1)	Kevin Asplund	Submission (choke)	Driller Promotions: O-Town Throwdown 2	April 18, 2015	3	2:26	Owatonna, Minnesota, United States	
Loss	73–20 (1)	Timothy Johnson	TKO (punches)	Dakota FC 19: Fall Brawl	October 25, 2014	1	3:46	Fargo, North Dakota, United States	For the DFC Heavyweight Championship.
Loss	73–19 (1)	Chris Barnett	TKO (punches)	Inoki Genome Fight 2	August 23, 2014	2	0:27	Tokyo, Japan	Open Weight bout.
Win	73–18 (1)	Danyelle Williams	Decision (unanimous)	Driller Promotions: A-Town Throwdown III	June 27, 2014	3	5:00	Austin, Minnesota, United States	Defended the DP Heavyweight Championship.
Win	72–18 (1)	Dallas Mitchell	Decision (unanimous)	EB: Beatdown at 4 Bears 11	June 7, 2014	3	5:00	New Town, North Dakota, United States	Catchweight (215 lbs) bout.
Win	71–18 (1)	Brian Heden	TKO (punches)	Driller Promotions: No Mercy 11	May 24, 2014	1	4:17	Detroit Lakes, Minnesota, United States	Won the DP Heavyweight Championship.
Win	70–18 (1)	Terry Davinney	TKO (punches)	Driller Promotions: O-Town Throwdown 1	April 12, 2014	1	3:42	Owatonna, Minnesota, United States	
Win	69–18 (1)	Brett Murphy	Decision (unanimous)	Valhalla Cage Fighting: Countdown to War	December 31, 2013	3	5:00	Minneapolis, Minnesota, United States	
Loss	68–18 (1)	Mike Kyle	KO (punches)	CFA 11: Kyle vs. Wiuff 2	May 24, 2013	1	0:21	Coral Gables, Florida, United States	
Loss	68–17 (1)	Ryan Martinez	KO (punches)	Bellator 93	March 21, 2013	1	0:18	Lewiston, Maine, United States	
Loss	68–16 (1)	Maro Perak	Decision (split)	Abu Dhabi Warriors 1	November 2, 2012	3	3:00	Abu Dhabi, United Arab Emirates	Return to Heavyweight.
Loss	68–15 (1)	Attila Vegh	KO (punches)	Bellator 73	August 24, 2012	1	0:25	Tunica, Mississippi, United States	Bellator 2012 Light Heavyweight Tournament Final.
Win	68–14 (1)	Tim Carpenter	Decision (unanimous)	Bellator 72	July 20, 2012	3	5:00	Tampa, Florida, United States	Bellator 2012 Light Heavyweight Tournament Semifinal.
Win	67–14 (1)	Chris Davis	TKO (punches)	Bellator 71	June 22, 2012	1	4:12	Chester, West Virginia, United States	Bellator 2012 Light Heavyweight Tournament Quarterfinal.
Win	66–14 (1)	Anthony Gomez	Decision (unanimous)	Bellator 60	March 9, 2012	3	5:00	Hammond, Indiana, United States	Catchweight (215 lbs) bout.
Win	65–14 (1)	Christian M'Pumbu	Decision (unanimous)	Bellator 55	October 22, 2011	3	5:00	Yuma, Arizona, United States	Return to Light Heavyweight.
Win	64–14 (1)	Nick Baker	TKO (punches)	Extreme Challenge 183	May 14, 2011	1	2:11	Black River Falls, Wisconsin, United States	
Win	63–14 (1)	Richard White	TKO (submission to punches)	CFX: Extreme Challenge on Target	December 12, 2010	1	3:20	Minneapolis, Minnesota, United States	
Loss	62–14 (1)	Tim Hague	KO (punch)	AMMA 5: Uprising	October 1, 2010	1	1:50	Edmonton, Alberta, Canada	
Win	62–13 (1)	Josh Barnes	TKO (punches)	Moosin: God of Martial Arts	May 21, 2010	1	0:34	Worcester, Massachusetts, United States	
Win	61–13 (1)	Jeff Monson	Decision (split)	CFX/XKL: Mayhem in Minneapolis	April 24, 2010	3	5:00	Minneapolis, Minnesota, United States	
Win	60–13 (1)	Chuck Hoskins	Decision (unanimous)	Combat USA: 18	March 26, 2010	3	5:00	Onalaska, Wisconsin, United States	
NC	59–13 (1)	Mike Kyle	NC (punch after the bell)	KOTC: Vengeance	February 12, 2010	2	5:00	Mescalero, New Mexico, United States	Originally a win for Kyle by KO; later changed to No Contest.
Win	59–13	Justin Newcomb	TKO (punches)	IFC: Wiuff vs. Newcomb	January 8, 2010	1	1:01	Green Bay, Wisconsin, United States	
Win	58–13	Waylon Goldsmith	Submission (armbar)	Fight Nation	October 3, 2009	1	0:20	Rochester, Minnesota, United States	
Win	57–13	Tracy Willis	TKO (submission to punches)	IFC: Caged Combat	August 15, 2009	2	1:46	Penticton, British Columbia, Canada	
Win	56–13	Chris Barden	TKO (submission to punches)	Extreme Challenge 128	May 30, 2009	1	0:41	Rochester, Minnesota, United States	
Loss	55–13	Stanislav Nedkov	TKO (punches)	World Victory Road Presents: Sengoku 8	May 2, 2009	3	0:42	Tokyo, Japan	Light Heavyweight bout.
Win	55–12	Steve Pilkington	TKO (punches)	Extreme Challenge 119	January 31, 2009	1	4:48	Rochester, Minnesota, United States	
Loss	54–12	Muhammed Lawal	TKO (punches)	World Victory Road Presents: Sengoku 5	September 28, 2008	1	2:11	Tokyo, Japan	
Win	54–11	Kazuyuki Fujita	KO (punches)	World Victory Road Presents: Sengoku 3	June 8, 2008	1	1:24	Saitama, Japan	
Win	53–11	Chris Tuchscherer	Decision (unanimous)	YAMMA Pit Fighting 1	April 11, 2008	3	5:00	Atlantic City, New Jersey, United States	Won YAMMA Heavyweight Tournament.
Win	52–11	Ricco Rodriguez	Decision (unanimous)	YAMMA Pit Fighting 1	April 11, 2008	1	5:00	Atlantic City, New Jersey, United States	YAMMA Heavyweight Tournament Semifinal.
Win	51–11	Marcelo Donald Pereira	Decision (unanimous)	YAMMA Pit Fighting 1	April 11, 2008	1	5:00	Atlantic City, New Jersey, United States	YAMMA Heavyweight Tournament Quarterfinal.
Win	50–11	Jesse Veium	TKO (punches)	IFO: Fireworks in the Cage IV	December 28, 2007	1	3:25	Las Vegas, Nevada, United States	
Win	49–11	Travis Fulton	TKO (punches)	Smash: MMA	November 30, 2007	2	3:27	Virginia, United States	
Win	48–11	Wade Hamilton	TKO (punches)	WFC: Downtown Throwdown	September 14, 2007	1	0:50	Minneapolis, Minnesota, United States	
Win	47–11	Sean Salmon	Submission (guillotine choke)	IFO: Wiuff vs. Salmon	September 1, 2007	1	3:37	Las Vegas, Nevada, United States	
Win	46–11	Ralph Kelly	TKO (submission to punches)	CCCF: Red River Riot 2	August 11, 2007	3	0:45	Thackerville, Oklahoma, United States	
Loss	45–11	Jared Hamman	KO (punches)	IFC: Global Domination 2	July 14, 2007	2	N/A	Marksville, Louisiana, United States	
Win	45–10	Josh Bennett	KO (punches)	IFC: Global Domination 2	July 14, 2007	1	N/A	Marksville, Louisiana, United States	
Win	44–10	Arthur Cesar	Submission	IFC: Caged Combat	April 13, 2007	2	3:09	Corpus Christi, Texas, United States	Won the vacant IFC Americas Cruiserweight Championship.
Loss	43–10	James Lee	Submission (guillotine choke)	PRIDE 33	February 24, 2007	1	0:39	Las Vegas, Nevada, United States	Catchweight (210 lbs) bout.
Win	43–9	Jason Guida	Decision (unanimous)	Xtreme Fighting Organization 14	December 9, 2006	3	5:00	Mokena, Illinois, United States	
Win	42–9	Wojtek Kaszowski	Decision (unanimous)	IFL: Gracie vs. Miletich	September 23, 2006	3	4:00	Moline, Illinois, United States	
Loss	41–9	Devin Cole	Decision (unanimous)	IFL: Championship 2006	June 3, 2006	3	4:00	Atlantic City, New Jersey, United States	Heavyweight bout.
Loss	41–8	Alex Schoenauer	Submission (heel hook)	IFL: Legends Championship 2006	April 29, 2006	2	3:23	Atlantic City, New Jersey, United States	
Loss	41–7	Marvin Eastman	Decision (majority)	Elite Fighting 1: Supremacy	March 18, 2006	4	5:00	Vancouver, British Columbia, Canada	
Win	41–6	Fabiano Capoani	KO (punches)	Battle at the Boardwalk (Day 1)	February 17, 2006	3	4:54	Atlantic City, New Jersey, United States	
Win	40–6	Ron Fields	TKO (submission to elbows)	Coliseum 2	December 28, 2005	2	2:50	Rochester, Minnesota, United States	
Win	39–6	Jimmy Westfall	Submission (armbar)	Extreme Challenge 65	October 21, 2005	1	2:56	Medina, Minnesota, United States	
Loss	38–6	Jason Lambert	KO (punches)	Freestyle FC 15: Fiesta Las Vegas	September 14, 2005	1	3:19	Las Vegas, Nevada, United States	
Win	38–5	William Hill	TKO (doctor stoppage)	IFC: Rock N' Rumble	July 30, 2005	1	5:00	Reno, Nevada, United States	Won the vacant ISKA MMA Light Heavyweight Championship.
Win	37–5	Matt Horwich	Decision (unanimous)	Extreme Challenge 62	June 18, 2005	3	5:00	Medina, Minnesota, United States	
Win	36–5	Ramazan Akhadullaev	Decision (unanimous)	Euphoria: USA vs. Russia	May 14, 2005	3	5:00	Atlantic City, New Jersey, United States	
Loss	35–5	Renato Sobral	Submission (armbar)	UFC 52	April 16, 2005	2	0:24	Las Vegas, Nevada, United States	Light Heavyweight debut.
Win	35–4	Antoine Jaoude	Decision (unanimous)	Euphoria: USA vs World	February 26, 2005	3	5:00	Atlantic City, New Jersey, United States	
Win	34–4	Ibragim Magomedov	Decision (unanimous)	Euphoria: Road to the Titles	October 15, 2004	3	5:00	Atlantic City, New Jersey, United States	
Win	33–4	Josh Hendricks	TKO (submission to punches)	Extreme Challenge 59	September 24, 2004	1	4:22	Medina, Minnesota, United States	
Win	32–4	Ruben Villareal	Submission (keylock)	Xtreme Kage Kombat: Eastc Side Rumble	July 24, 2004	2	N/A	St. Paul, Minnesota, United States	
Win	31–4	John Dixon	TKO (cut)	Extreme Challenge 58	June 11, 2004	1	2:33	Medina, Minnesota, United States	
Win	30–4	Leopoldo Montenegro	KO (slam and punches)	Jungle Fight 2	May 15, 2004	1	4:33	Manaus, Brazil	
Win	29–4	Demian Decorah	TKO (punches)	Extreme Challenge 56	March 26, 2004	1	2:20	Medina, Minnesota, United States	
Win	28–4	Roman Zentsov	TKO (cut)	Euphoria: Russia vs USA	March 13, 2004	2	2:46	Atlantic City, New Jersey, United States	
Win	27–4	Carlos Barreto	Decision (unanimous)	Heat FC 2: Evolution	December 18, 2003	3	5:00	Natal, Brazil	
Win	26–4	Nate Sauer	KO (slam)	Red Wing Rumble	November 30, 2003	1	N/A	Minnesota, United States	
Win	25–4	Travis Fulton	Decision (split)	Iowa Challenge 11	October 18, 2003	3	3:00	Iowa, United States	
Win	24–4	Mark Tullius	Decision (unanimous)	CFM: Octogono Extremo	September 27, 2003	3	4:00	Monterrey, Mexico	
Win	23–4	Royce Louck	TKO (punches)	IFA: Summer Bash	August 30, 2003	2	1:49	Minnesota, United States	
Win	22–4	Greg Wikan	Decision (unanimous)	Ring of Fire 9: Eruption	August 9, 2003	3	5:00	Baraboo, Wisconsin, United States	
Win	21–4	Tony Mendoza	Submission (forearm choke)	Victory Fighting 5	July 12, 2003	2	1:00	Council Bluffs, Iowa, United States	
Win	20–4	DR Williams	TKO (submission to punches)	IFA: Explosion	July 5, 2003	3	0:43	Minnesota, United States	
Win	19–4	Chad Rafdel	TKO (submission to punches)	IFA: Clash of the Champions	May 24, 2003	2	0:27	Owatonna, Minnesota, United States	
Win	18–4	Royce Louck	TKO (submission to punches)	Bar Room Brawl 10	April 30, 2003	1	1:11	United States	
Win	17–4	DR Williams	TKO (punches)	Bar Room Brawl 5	March 26, 2003	1	3:48	United States	
Loss	16–4	Kauai Kupihea	KO (punch)	Rumble on the Rock 2	March 15, 2003	1	4:21	Hilo, Hawaii, United States	
Win	16–3	Andy Montana	Decision (unanimous)	Rage in the Cage 45: Finally	March 1, 2003	3	3:00	Phoenix, Arizona, United States	
Win	15–3	Royce Louck	TKO (submission to punches)	Bar Room Brawl 1	February 26, 2003	1	1:49	United States	
Win	14–3	Buddy Lewis	TKO (submission to punches)	Tennessee Shooto: Conquest	January 17, 2003	2	2:55	Clarksville, Tennessee, United States	
Win	13–3	Brian Shepard	TKO (submission to punches)	International Cage Combat 1: Retribution	January 12, 2003	1	4:00	Minneapolis, Minnesota, United States	
Loss	12–3	Vladimir Matyushenko	TKO (submission to punches)	UFC 40	November 22, 2002	1	4:10	Las Vegas, Nevada, United States	
Win	12–2	Jason Godsey	Decision	Ultimate Wrestling: Godsey vs Wiuff	October 19, 2002	4	5:00	Minneapolis, Minnesota, United States	
Win	11–2	Johnathan Ivey	Decision	Ultimate Wrestling: Minnesota	August 24, 2002	3	5:00	Minneapolis, Minnesota, United States	
Win	10–2	Travis Fulton	Decision (unanimous)	Iowa Challenge 5	July 13, 2002	3	5:00	Iowa, United States	
Win	9–2	Kevin Jordan	Decision (unanimous)	Ultimate Wrestling	June 29, 2002	3	5:00	Minneapolis, Minnesota, United States	
Win	8–2	Tom McCloud	TKO (punches)	Victory Fighting Championships 1	June 16, 2002	1	0:35	Iowa, United States	
Loss	7–2	Wesley Correira	TKO (knees)	SB 24: Return of the Heavyweights 2	April 27, 2002	3	1:40	Honolulu, Hawaii, United States	
Win	7–1	Chad Rafdel	Submission (keylock)	Ultimate Wrestling: St. Cloud 2	March 16, 2002	1	1:40	St. Cloud, Minnesota, United States	
Win	6–1	Josh Mueller	TKO (submission to punches)	Ultimate Wrestling: St. Cloud 2	March 16, 2002	1	0:32	St. Cloud, Minnesota, United States	
Win	5–1	Chad Rafdel	Submission (keylock)	Ultimate Wrestling: Rumble at the Jungle	March 8, 2002	1	1:00	Minnesota, United States	
Win	4–1	Chad Brady	TKO (punches)	Ultimate Wrestling: Rumble at the Jungle	March 8, 2002	1	0:22	Minnesota, United States	
Loss	3–1	Mike Radnov	TKO (cut)	Extreme Challenge 46	February 16, 2002	1	5:00	Clive, Iowa, United States	
Win	3–0	Keith Jardine	KO (punch)	Extreme Challenge 46	February 16, 2002	1	0:06	Clive, Iowa, United States	
Win	2–0	Lenn Walker	TKO (submission to punches)	Ultimate Wrestling: New Blood	February 1, 2002	1	1:15	Minnesota, United States	
Win	1–0	Jeff Greer	TKO (submission to punches)	Ultimate Wrestling: Rumble in Ramsey 1	September 7, 2001	1	N/A	Ramsey, Minnesota, United States	Heavyweight debut.
