= Daniel Gracie =

Brazilian Jiu-Jitsu practitioner and mixed martial artist

- Born: Daniel Simões; June 28, 1972 (age 54); Rio de Janeiro, Brazil
- Height: 6 ft 2 in (1.88 m)
- Weight: 205 lb (93 kg; 14.6 st)
- Division: Light Heavyweight
- Style: MMA, Brazilian jiu-jitsu, Submission wrestling
- Team: Renzo Gracie Jiu-Jitsu
- Rank: 6th degree black belt in Brazilian Jiu-Jitsu under Renzo Gracie

Mixed martial arts record
- Total: 10
- Wins: 5
- By submission: 4
- By decision: 1
- Losses: 4
- By knockout: 2
- By decision: 2
- Draws: 1

Other information
- Mixed martial arts record from Sherdog

Daniel Simões, known professionally as Daniel Gracie, is a Brazilian former mixed martial artist, professional wrestler and practitioner of Brazilian Jiu-Jitsu. He is cousin to Renzo Gracie, Ralph Gracie, Charles Gracie and Ryan Gracie.

== Biography ==
Daniel “Gracie” Simoes was born June 28, 1972, in Rio de Janeiro, Brazil. Being very close to his cousins; Charles, Renzo, Ralph and Ryan Gracie, jiu-jitsu was always present in Daniel's life growing up. He started taking training more serious around 1982, training under Carlos Gracie, Jr. at Gracie Barra. He received his black belt in 1996 after winning at the World Jiu-Jitsu Championship in the absolute division as a brown belt.

== Mixed martial arts ==
Gracie has competed both in sport BJJ and mixed martial arts events such as the PRIDE Fighting Championships, the International Fight League, and the prestigious ADCC Submission Wrestling World Championship. He fought for Team Gracie in the IFL, where he submitted former UFC fighter Wes Sims. After a TKO loss in 2006, Daniel decided to walk away from MMA for a while to concentrate on teaching BJJ at Renzo Gracie's Academy.

=== Return ===
Gracie made his return to MMA after a 4-year hiatus from fighting. He fought at Israel FC: Genesis and earned a quick 1st round submission victory.

=== Bellator Fighting Championships ===
Gracie participated in the Bellator Season 4 light heavyweight tournament that began in March 2011 on MTV2. He was eliminated in the opening round at Bellator 38 by Tim Carpenter via split decision.

== Professional wrestling ==
On October 14, 2013, Daniel, along with Rolles Gracie, Jr., made an appearance for professional wrestling promotion New Japan Pro-Wrestling (NJPW) at the King of Pro-Wrestling pay-per-view, issuing an open challenge for the January 4, 2014, Wrestle Kingdom 8 in Tokyo Dome event, which was later answered by Yuji Nagata and Kazushi Sakuraba, the latter known as the "Gracie Hunter" for his MMA bouts with members of the Gracie family. The Gracies lost the match via disqualification, after Rolles choked Nagata out with his gi. A rematch between the two teams took place on February 11 at The New Beginning in Osaka and saw Rolles submit Sakuraba for the win. On April 6 at Invasion Attack 2014, the Gracies defeated Takashi Iizuka and Toru Yano in another tag team match. Later in the event, Daniel entered the IWGP Intercontinental Championship picture by challenging Shinsuke Nakamura, whom he had defeated in an MMA fight in 2002. The Gracies' win streak continued on May 3 at Wrestling Dontaku 2014, where they defeated Nakamura and Sakuraba. This led to Daniel's first singles match on May 25 at Back to the Yokohama Arena, where he unsuccessfully challenged Nakamura for the IWGP Intercontinental Championship.

== Personal life ==
Contrary to popular belief, Daniel is not a Gracie by name but he is blood related. Daniel is the cousin of brothers: Charles, Renzo, Ralph and Ryan Gracie. Daniel's mother is Renzo’s mother’s sister, he was raised amongst the Gracie family.

== Mixed martial arts record ==
Professional record breakdown
10 matches	5 wins	4 losses
By knockout	0	2
By submission	4	0
By decision	1	2
Draws	1	

Res.	Record	Opponent	Method	Event	Date	Round	Time	Location	Notes
Loss	5–4–1	Duane Bastress	TKO (doctor stoppage)	Bellator 54	October 15, 2011	2	5:00	Atlantic City, New Jersey, United States	
Loss	5–3–1	Tim Carpenter	Decision (split)	Bellator 38	March 26, 2011	3	5:00	Tunica, Mississippi, United States	Bellator Season 4 Light Heavyweight Tournament Quarterfinal
Win	5–2–1	Martin Wojcik	Submission (rear-naked choke)	Israel FC: Genesis	November 9, 2010	1	2:17	Tel Aviv, Israel	
Loss	4–2–1	Allan Goes	TKO (punches)	IFL: World Championship Semifinals	November 2, 2006	2	1:03	Portland, Oregon, United States	
Win	4–1–1	Wes Sims	Technical Submission (standing rear-naked choke)	IFL: Championship 2006	June 3, 2006	1	2:42	Atlantic City, New Jersey, United States	
Draw	3–1–1	Wes Sims	Technical Draw	GFC: Team Gracie vs Team Hammer House	March 3, 2006	2	5:00	Columbus, Ohio, United States	
Win	3–1	Wataru Sakata	Submission (armbar)	Pride: Shockwave 2003	December 31, 2003	1	7:12	Saitama, Saitama, Japan	
Loss	2–1	Kazuhiro Nakamura	Decision (unanimous)	Pride Bushido 1	October 5, 2003	2	5:00	Saitama, Saitama, Japan	
Win	2–0	Shinsuke Nakamura	Submission (armbar)	Inoki Bom-Ba-Ye 2002	December 31, 2002	2	2:14	Saitama, Saitama, Japan	
Win	1–0	Takashi Sugiura	Decision (split)	Pride 21	June 23, 2002	3	5:00	Saitama, Saitama, Japan	
