= American Top Team (IFL camp) =

MMA training camp

American Top Team (ATT) was one of the camps participating in the International Fight League (IFL). The group was founded by Ricardo Liborio. ATT was one of the few camps to participate in the IFL and not be part of an original established group.

== Record/roster ==
^{1}= fought when Lew Polley was fighting with Team Tompkins

All records are IFL fights only

IFL camp record as of 04/04/08: 1–1–1

=== Current fighters as of 2008 ===
- Rafael Dias (1-1) (LW)

def Santino Defranco by submission (rear naked choke) in the first round (02/29/08)

lost to LC Davis by KO in the third round (04/04/08)

- Emyr Bussade (1–0) (WW)

def Jesse Lennox by submission (kneebar) in the second round (04/04/08)

- Carmelo Marrero (0–0–1) (LHW)

the fight with Mike Ciesnolevicz went to a no contest due to an accidental headbutt (04/04/08)

- Lew Polley (0–1) (HW)

lost to Alexandre Ferreria by submission (guillotine choke) in the first round (02/29/08)^{1}

== 2008 season schedule/results ==
Date	Opponent	Result
April 4, 2008	Miletich Fighting Systems (IFL camp)	1–1–1
