= Anthony Gomez =

American wrestler, kickboxer and mixed martial arts fighter

- Born: November 7, 1981 (age 44); Chicago, Illinois, U.S.
- Height: 6 ft 3 in (1.91 m)
- Weight: 215 lb (98 kg; 15.4 st)
- Division: Light Heavyweight; Heavyweight
- Reach: 77.0 in (196 cm)
- Fighting out of: East Chicago, Indiana, U.S.
- Team: Torres Martial Arts Academy (2006–2012, 2014–present); Freelance
- Trainer: Miguel Torres (current)
- Rank: blue belt in Brazilian Jiu-Jitsu; NCAA Division III in Wrestling
- Years active: 2006–present

Professional boxing record
- Total: 1
- Wins: 1
- By knockout: 1
- Losses: 0

Kickboxing record
- Total: 2
- Wins: 1
- Losses: 0
- Draws: 1

Mixed martial arts record
- Total: 13
- Wins: 10
- By knockout: 3
- By submission: 4
- By decision: 3
- Losses: 3
- By decision: 3

Other information
- Notable schools: North Central College (class of 2006); George Washington High School
- Mixed martial arts record from Sherdog

Anthony Gomez (born November 7, 1981) is an American professional boxer, mixed martial artist and kickboxer currently competing in the Heavyweight division. A professional MMA competitor since 2006, he has competed for Bellator MMA.

== Background ==
Anthony met Miguel Torres in 2001 and started training under him full-time in 2006 under his Torres Martial Arts Academy camp in Indiana, before this Gomez wrestled at North Central College. Anthony has also competed in 2 North American Grappling Association tournaments in the 100+ kg division, losing both in the semi-finals.

== Mixed martial arts career ==
=== Early career ===
Turning professional in 2006, Gomez compiled a record of 5–1 before making his debut for Bellator MMA. Most of his wins were by stoppage.

=== Bellator MMA ===
Gomez debuted for Bellator in March 2012 at Bellator 60, he faced Travis Wiuff. Gomez was defeated via unanimous decision.

In his next appearance for Bellator, Gomez faced Jose Medina at Bellator 75 on October 5, 2012. Gomez won the fight via rear-naked choke submission in the first round.

Gomez then faced Anton Talamantes at Bellator 84 on December 14, 2012. He won by submission in round one.

Gomez faced Jason Guida on March 14, 2014, at Bellator 112. Gomez won via three-round unanimous decision.

== Mixed martial arts record ==
Professional record breakdown
| 12 matches | 10 wins | 2 losses |
| By knockout | 3 | 0 |
| By submission | 4 | 0 |
| By decision | 3 | 2 |

| Res. | Record | Opponent | Method | Event | Date | Round | Time | Location | Notes |
|---|---|---|---|---|---|---|---|---|---|
| Loss | 10-3 | William Penn | Decision (unanimous) | HFC 24: Gomez vs. Penn | June 6, 2015 | 3 | 5:00 | Valparaiso, Indiana, United States | |
| Win | 10-2 | Miodrag Petkovic | TKO (punches) | UCL: Havoc in Hammond 2 | March 27, 2015 | 2 | 1:11 | Hammond, Indiana, United States | |
| Win | 9–2 | Robert Morrow | Submission (triangle choke) | Hoosier Fight Club 23 | March 7, 2015 | 1 | 4:23 | Valparaiso, Indiana, United States | Return to Heavyweight. |
| Win | 8–2 | Jason Guida | Decision (unanimous) | Bellator 112 | March 14, 2014 | 3 | 5:00 | Hammond, Indiana, United States | Catchweight bout (215 lbs). |
| Win | 7–2 | Anton Talamantes | Submission (rear-naked choke) | Bellator 84 | December 14, 2012 | 1 | 3:30 | Hammond, Indiana, United States | Catchweight bout (215 lbs). |
| Win | 6–2 | Jose Medina | Submission (rear-naked choke) | Bellator 75 | October 5, 2012 | 1 | 2:32 | Hammond, Indiana, United States | Catchweight bout (210 lbs). |
| Loss | 5–2 | Travis Wiuff | Decision (unanimous) | Bellator 60 | March 9, 2012 | 3 | 5:00 | Hammond, Indiana, United States | Catchweight bout (215 lbs). |
| Win | 5–1 | Lew Polley | Decision (split) | Hoosier FC 4: Showdown at the Steel Yard | June 11, 2010 | 3 | 5:00 | Gary, Indiana, United States | Catchweight bout (215 lbs). |
| Win | 4–1 | Will Hill | Submission (armbar) | Total Fight Challenge 16 | June 27, 2009 | 3 | 3:00 | Hammond, Indiana, United States | |
| Win | 3–1 | Lee Defoose | TKO (punches) | Total Fight Challenge 15 | May 30, 2009 | 1 | 1:17 | Hammond, Indiana, United States | Heavyweight bout. |
| Win | 2–1 | Dan Bolden | TKO (punches) | Total Fight Challenge 11 | February 9, 2008 | 2 | 2:20 | Hammond, Indiana, United States | |
| Win | 1–1 | Derek Thornton | Decision (unanimous) | IMMAC 2: Attack | April 21, 2007 | 3 | 5:00 | Chicago, Illinois, United States | |
| Loss | 0–1 | Krzysztof Kulak | Decision (split) | IMMAC 1: Attack | November 4, 2006 | 3 | 5:00 | Chicago, Illinois, United States | Heavyweight bout. |
