= UFC 98 =

UFC mixed martial arts event in 2009

UFC 98: Evans vs. Machida
- The poster for UFC 98: Evans vs. Machida
- Promotion: Ultimate Fighting Championship
- Date: May 23, 2009
- Venue: MGM Grand Garden Arena
- City: Las Vegas, Nevada
- Attendance: 12,606
- Total gate: $3,257,350
- Buyrate: 635,000
- Total purse: $957,000

Event chronology
UFC 97: Redemption	UFC 98: Evans vs. Machida	UFC 99: The Comeback

UFC 98: Evans vs. Machida was a mixed martial arts event held by the Ultimate Fighting Championship (UFC) on May 23, 2009, in Las Vegas, Nevada.

== Background ==
A title unification match between the Interim UFC Heavyweight Champion Frank Mir and UFC Heavyweight Champion Brock Lesnar was originally slated to be the main event, but was postponed until UFC 100 due to a knee injury to Mir.

By way of replacement, Quinton Jackson, former UFC Light Heavyweight champion, was to fight the undefeated current champion Rashad Evans but had to undergo arthroscopic surgery to repair ligament damage in his jaw that he received in a previous training camp. Instead, Evans headlined the card against fellow undefeated contender Lyoto Machida.

The card featured the long anticipated grudge match between The Ultimate Fighter 6 coaches Matt Hughes and Matt Serra.

Due to injury, Josh Koscheck was not able to participate on this card. Brock Larson stepped in as the new opponent for Chris Wilson. Chris Wilson was unable to complete the necessary medical paperwork in order to compete at the event and was replaced by Mike Pyle.

James Irvin was set to make his Middleweight debut against Drew McFedries, but was not able to fight due to a knee injury. Xavier Foupa-Pokam stepped in to fight McFedries.

Yushin Okami was set to fight Dan Miller on the main card but was taken off the card after Okami suffered a torn ligament. Early reports suggested Ed Herman would replace Okami, however Chael Sonnen stepped in to take the bout.

Houston Alexander was scheduled to fight André Gusmão, but was forced to pull out due to a broken hand. Krzysztof Soszynski stepped in to fight Gusmao.

== Results ==
Main card (PPV)
Weight class				Method	Round	Time	Notes
Light Heavyweight	Lyoto Machida	def.	Rashad Evans (c)	KO (punches)	2	3:57	(Note: For the UFC Light Heavyweight Championship.)
Welterweight	Matt Hughes	def.	Matt Serra	Decision (unanimous) (29-28, 29-28, 29-28)	3	5:00
Middleweight	Drew McFedries	def.	Xavier Foupa-Pokam	TKO (punches)	1	0:37
Middleweight	Chael Sonnen	def.	Dan Miller	Decision (unanimous) (30–27, 30–27, 30–27)	3	5:00
Lightweight	Frankie Edgar	def.	Sean Sherk	Decision (unanimous) (30-27, 30-27, 30-27)	3	5:00
Preliminary card
Catchweight (172 lb)	Brock Larson	def.	Mike Pyle	Submission (arm-triangle choke)	1	3:06	(Note: Pyle missed weight.)
Heavyweight	Tim Hague	def.	Pat Barry	Submission (guillotine choke)	1	1:42
Lightweight	Kyle Bradley	def.	Phillipe Nover	TKO (punches)	1	1:03
Light Heavyweight	Krzysztof Soszynski	def.	André Gusmão	KO (punch)	1	3:17
Welterweight	Yoshiyuki Yoshida	def.	Brandon Wolff	Submission (guillotine choke)	1	2:24
Lightweight	George Roop	def.	Dave Kaplan	Decision (split) (28–29, 30–27, 30–27)	3	5:00

== Bonus awards ==
The following fighters received $60,000 bonuses.

- Fight of the Night: Matt Hughes vs. Matt Serra
- Knockout of the Night: Lyoto Machida
- Submission of the Night: Brock Larson

== Reported payout ==
- Lyoto Machida: $140,000 (includes $70,000 win bonus) def. Rashad Evans: $200,000
- Matt Hughes: $200,000 ($100,000 win bonus) def. Matt Serra: $75,000
- Drew McFedries: $34,000 ($17,000 win bonus) def. Xavier Foupa-Pokam: $6,000
- Chael Sonnen: $50,000 ($25,000 win bonus) def. Dan Miller: $15,000
- Frankie Edgar: $40,000 ($20,000 win bonus) def. Sean Sherk: $40,000
- Brock Larson: $42,000 ($21,000 win bonus) def. Mike Pyle: $15,000
- Tim Hague: $10,000 ($5,000 win bonus) def. Pat Barry: $7,000
- Kyle Bradley: $8,000 ($4,000 win bonus) def. Phillipe Nover: $10,000
- Krzysztof Soszynski: $16,000 ($8,000 win bonus) def. Andre Gusmao: $5,000
- Yoshiyuki Yoshida: $16,000 ($8,000 win bonus) def. Brandon Wolff: $4,000
- George Roop: $16,000 ($8,000 win bonus) def. David Kaplan: $8,000
- Citation needed

== See also ==
- Ultimate Fighting Championship
- List of UFC champions
- List of UFC events
- 2009 in UFC
