= Tim Carpenter (fighter) =

American mixed martial arts fighter

- Born: July 24, 1980 (age 46); Philadelphia, Pennsylvania, United States
- Height: 6 ft 3 in (1.91 m)
- Weight: 205 lb (93 kg; 14.6 st)
- Division: Light Heavyweight
- Fighting out of: Philadelphia, Pennsylvania, United States
- Team: Nak Muay Gym
- Rank: Black belt in Brazilian Jiu-Jitsu
- Years active: 2005-2012

Mixed martial arts record
- Total: 11
- Wins: 9
- By knockout: 1
- By submission: 4
- By decision: 4
- Losses: 2
- By knockout: 1
- By decision: 1

Other information
- Mixed martial arts record from Sherdog

Tim Carpenter (born July 24, 1980) is an American mixed martial artist who last competed in 2012.

== Background ==
Carpenter was born in West Chester, Pennsylvania; the youngest of five kids. His father was a public school social studies teacher and his mother worked at West Chester University. He was a very fat child and teenager growing up. At the age of 15 he began training in judo under PA State Champion Joe Condello who was one of Ishikawa sensei's top American students. Through his training in judo he began to lose weight and get in shape and began to compete in Judo competitions. He went on to become one of the top ranked junior judo athletes in the country placing second in the '97 USJI high school nationals, first in the '98 USJI National Junior Olympic championships, first place in the '98 Pa State Championship. His success in competition earned him an opportunity to train for a short time at the US olympic training center, living and training with some of the top athletes in the world.

== Mixed martial arts career ==
=== Judo and Jiu-Jitsu ===
In 1997 he began training in Gracie Jiu Jitsu under Steve Maxwell and Phil Migliarese at Maxercise in Philadelphia. Maxercise was one of the first Gracie Jiu Jitsu academies in the nation and was frequently visited by Gracie family members, notably Royce, Rorion, Relson, as well as many of their top instructors. Tim was awarded his blue belt in Gracie Jiu Jitsu by Royce Gracie after attending a seminar in Philadelphia and Royce watching him roll with several more advanced students after only 4 months of training in jiu-jitsu. When Maxercise closed Tim became a member of Team Balance under Relson Gracie black belt Phil Migliarese. He was one of the original instructors at Balance Headquarters for several years as well as one of the top competitors for the team winning numerous grappling and Jiu Jitsu titles including:

2004 purple belt Pan American Jiu Jitsu Champion

2004 Arnold World Gracie Jiu Jitsu Champion Purple belt

2004 IBJJF US National Silver Medalist

2005 IBJJF Brown Belt USA vs. Brazil Champion

2005 Arnold World Gracie Jiu Jitsu Champion Brown Belt

2005 Gracie Worlds Submission Wrestling Champion

Multiple Time Grapplers Quest Champion

NAGA Champion

2007 Abu Dhabi Submission Wrestling world Championship Invitee and Semi Finalist

After years of competing in and winning some of the top Jiu Jitsu and Grappling competitions on the planet Tim was awarded his black belt in Gracie Jiu Jitsu from Phil Migliarese and Relson Gracie.

=== Early MMA career ===
After receiving his black belt, Tim decided to pursue a career in MMA. He went undefeated in his first seven fights, winning the light heavyweight title for two separate organizations, and both the Sportfighting and Combat in the Cage light heavyweight belts belonged to Tim.

=== Bellator ===
Despite being undefeated in his first seven fights, he did not have an easy path. He fought and defeated three world class BJJ blackbelts including Guybson Sa, fellow American BJJ phenom Jamal Patterson, and Daniel Gracie.

His victory over Jamal Patterson in Bellator 33 earned him a slot in the very first Bellator LHW tournament against Patterson's team mate and BJJ Blackbelt world champion Daniel Gracie. The fight lasted all three rounds, with Tim Carpenter dominating both the striking and grappling, scoring several knockdowns and close submission attempts on the Brazilian and earning him a hard fought decision victory and advancing to the next round of the tournament where he suffered an early stoppage loss to Christian M’pumbu.

Carpenter rebounded from this loss with a highlight reel Knockout victory over MMA veteran and D-1 wrestler Ryan Contaldi at Bellator 54.

His next fight saw him fighting in the second Bellator LHW tournament, Bellator 71. Carpenter won the fight via armbar submission in the second round. He was scheduled for an undercard fight against the durable John Hawk, but earned a spot as a last minute replacement when Richard Hale failed to make weight.

He took on the hard hitting former heavyweight Beau Tribolet. He dominated the action in the first round before weathering a storm of hard punches in the second round to secure a text book armbar from the guard and earning a submission victory with only seconds left on the clock.

His next fight was a decision loss to hulking American wrestler Travis Wiuff.

Following his final bout, Carpenter retired from mixed martial arts and opened a martial arts academy to teach and train students. As an instructor and coach, he has trained athletes who have competed in Brazilian jiu-jitsu and grappling competitions, as well as professional and amateur mixed martial arts. Among his students are competitors who have won titles at Brazilian jiu-jitsu world championships.

His academy, Hellfish Mixed Martial Arts is not focused on producing cage fighters, but rather on helping people improve their lives through training in the martial arts.

== Mixed martial arts record ==
Professional record breakdown
11 matches	9 wins	2 losses
By knockout	1	1
By submission	4	0
By decision	4	1

Res.	Record	Opponent	Method	Event	Date	Round	Time	Location	Notes
Loss	9–2	Travis Wiuff	Decision (unanimous)	Bellator 72	July 20, 2012	3	5:00	Tampa, Florida, United States	Bellator 2012 Summer Series Light Heavyweight Tournament Semifinal.
Win	9–1	Beau Tribolet	Submission (armbar)	Bellator 71	June 22, 2012	2	4:51	Chester, West Virginia, United States	Bellator 2012 Summer Series Light Heavyweight Tournament Quarterfinal.
Win	8–1	Ryan Contaldi	TKO (punch)	Bellator 54	October 15, 2011	1	2:16	Atlantic City, New Jersey, United States	
Loss	7–1	Christian M'Pumbu	TKO (punches)	Bellator 42	April 23, 2011	1	2:08	Concho, Oklahoma, United States	Bellator Season 4 Light Heavyweight Tournament Semifinal.
Win	7–0	Daniel Gracie	Decision (split)	Bellator 38	March 26, 2011	3	5:00	Tunica, Mississippi, United States	Bellator Season 4 Light Heavyweight Tournament Quarterfinal.
Win	6–0	Jamal Patterson	Decision (split)	Bellator 33	October 21, 2010	3	5:00	Philadelphia, Pennsylvania, United States	
Win	5–0	Guybson Sa	Decision (unanimous)	Matrix Fights 2	June 11, 2010	3	5:00	Philadelphia, Pennsylvania, United States	
Win	4–0	Rich Lictawa	Decision (unanimous)	Adrenaline: New Breed	February 26, 2010	3	5:00	Atlantic City, New Jersey, United States	
Win	3–0	Sean McCann	Submission (triangle choke)	CITC: Fearless Fighters Return	October 6, 2007	1	1:43	Trenton, New Jersey, United States	
Win	2–0	Dale Carson	Submission (armbar)	SportFighting 4: Battle for the Belts	August 19, 2006	2	1:27	Morristown, New Jersey, United States	
Win	1–0	Jonathan Helwig	Submission (triangle armbar)	Sportfighting 2	December 10, 2005	1	4:46	Hoboken, New Jersey, United States	
