= Krzysztof Soszynski =

Polish mixed martial arts fighter

Krzysztof Soszyński
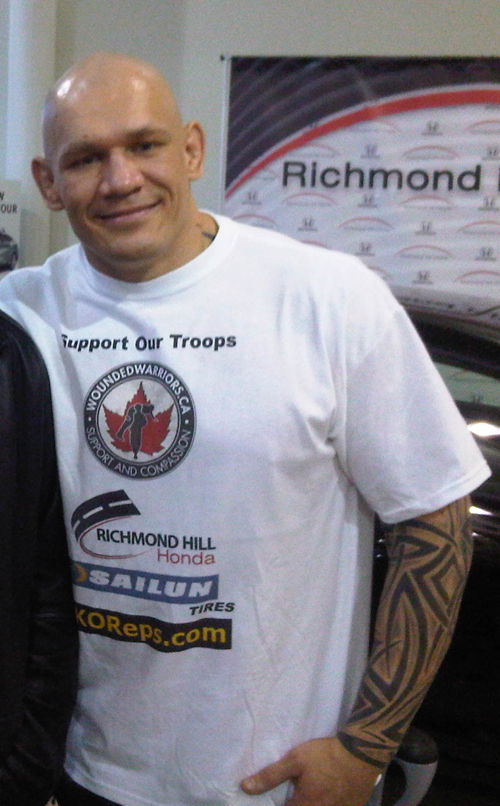
- A Polish‐Canadian actor and retired mixed martial artist
- Born: August 2, 1977 (age 49); Stalowa Wola, Poland
- Other names: The Polish Experiment
- Nationality: Polish; Canadian
- Height: 6 ft 1 in (185 cm)
- Weight: 205 lb (93 kg; 14.6 st)
- Division: Heavyweight; Light Heavyweight
- Reach: 77 1/2 in (197 cm)
- Stance: Southpaw
- Fighting out of: Winnipeg, Manitoba, Canada
- Team: Team Quest (2007–2010); Reign Training Center (2010–2013)
- Rank: Blue belt in Brazilian jiu-jitsu
- Years active: 2003–2014 (MMA)

Mixed martial arts record
- Total: 39
- Wins: 26
- By knockout: 11
- By submission: 10
- By decision: 3
- By disqualification: 2
- Losses: 12
- By knockout: 6
- By submission: 1
- By decision: 5
- Draws: 1

Other information
- Mixed martial arts record from Sherdog

Krzysztof Soszyński (Polish pronunciation: [ˈkʂɨʂtɔf sɔˈʂɨɲskʲi]; born August 2, 1977) is a Polish‐Canadian actor and retired mixed martial artist. An 11-year competitor from 2003 until 2014, Soszynski fought in the UFC, Strikeforce, the Los Angeles Anacondas of the IFL. Also, he was a contestant on The Ultimate Fighter: Team Nogueira vs. Team Mir.

== Background ==
Soszynski was born in Stalowa Wola, Poland, where he was raised until the age of ten, when his family moved to Winnipeg, Manitoba, Canada. Soszynski played football and soccer for Maples Collegiate, but later turned to weight training at the age of 16 before transitioning into bodybuilding and later professional wrestling. During his career in professional wrestling, which he began at the age of 21 and ended at the age of 25, Soszynski learned various judo techniques as well as submissions from fellow professional wrestler Bad News Brown, a bronze medalist in Judo at the 1976 Olympic games. After this, Soszynski began to pursue a career in mixed martial arts and also trained in Brazilian jiu-jitsu under black belt and gym owner, Rodrigo Munduruca, in Winnipeg. Soszynski also worked as a houseman at the Fairmont Winnipeg Hotel and as a promoter of local MMA events in Manitoba.

== Mixed martial arts career ==
=== The Ultimate Fighter ===
Soszynski entered The Ultimate Fighter, where he defeated Mike Stewart and Kyle Kingsbury on the way to the semifinals, where he lost to Brazilian jiu-jitsu specialist Vinny Magalhaes.

=== Ultimate Fighting Championship ===
Soszynski made his debut against former Ultimate Fighter castmate Shane Primm, whom he defeated by submission due to a kimura. It was awarded Submission of the Night.

His second fight was at UFC 97 where Soszynski again utilized the kimura to win his second consecutive Submission of the Night award by forcing former WEC Light heavyweight Champion Brian Stann to tap to the hold.

Soszynski next stepped in as a late replacement for Houston Alexander at UFC 98, knocking out André Gusmão at 3:17 in the first round.

Soszynski then stepped in as a replacement for an injured Matt Hamill to fight Brandon Vera at UFC 102 in Portland, Oregon. Soszynski lost via unanimous decision, bringing his UFC record down to 3–1.

Soszynski next faced Stephan Bonnar on February 21, 2010, at UFC 110. Soszynski was victorious via third-round TKO due to a cut, though the victory was shadowed by an accidental headbutt that caused the cut, creating controversy over the victory. The New South Wales Sports Combat Authority overlooked the fight which could have resulted in the decision being overturned, depending on the judges' scorecards after round two. However, they ruled against overturning the decision. Both fighters stated that there was the need for a rematch.

Their wish was later granted as the two had their rematch at UFC 116. In a close stand up battle, Soszynski got caught by a knee from Bonnar in the second round and lost via TKO after taking several unanswered punches. The fight was awarded Fight of the Night alongside the Leben/Akiyama fight, giving all the fighters an extra $75,000 to their pay.

Soszynski faced Goran Reljic on November 13, 2010, at UFC 122. He won the fight via unanimous decision.

Soszynski was scheduled to face Anthony Perosh on June 11, 2011, at UFC 131. However, Perosh was forced from the bout with an injury and replaced by Igor Pokrajac. Pokrajac was also injured and replaced by returning UFC veteran Mike Massenzio. He defeated Massenzio via unanimous decision (30–27, 30–26, and 30–27).

Soszynski/Pokrajac took place on December 10, 2011, at UFC 140. Soszynski was staggered early on with a straight right from Pokrajac, who followed him to the ground where he landed several shots that finished Soszynski off, resulting in a KO loss. Soszynski was unresponsive for a few minutes after the fight. In a video blog by Dana White, president of the UFC, leading up to UFC 141, there was footage of Soszynski following his loss to Pokrajac and was seen claiming that he is retiring from MMA. Later, he claimed he has no memory of what occurred in the video and says his future in MMA fighting will be dependent upon what his doctors say.

On August 15, 2014, Krzysztof announced his retirement from MMA competition on Inside MMA, citing memory problems that began occurring after his last fight.

== Film career ==
Aside from his appearance on The Ultimate Fighter TV show, Soszynski had a small uncredited role in an episode of CSI: Crime Scene Investigation entitled "S.F.C. - Cage Fighter".

Soszynski made an appearance in the movie Here Comes the Boom as a top MMA fighter in the UFC by the name of Ken "The Executioner" Dietrich. He then landed a major role in the movie Tapped Out (2014). He starred as Alpha in the 2016 Daylight's End. Soszynski had a role in the 2017 movie Logan.

== Personal life ==
Soszynski was married and has a son from a previous relationship.

Soszynski initially worked as a coach at UFC Gym Torrance, and is currently the Director of MMA and Fitness for UFC Gym Middle East.

Soszynski has also been acting as a color commentator of Konfrontacja Sztuk Walki as of 2020.

== Championships and achievements ==
- Ultimate Fighting Championship
  - Submission of the Night (Two times) vs. Shane Primm and Brian Stann
  - Fight of the Night (One time) vs. Stephan Bonnar
  - UFC.com Awards
    - 2010: Ranked #3 Fight of the Year vs. Stephan Bonnar

== Mixed martial arts record ==
Professional record breakdown
39 matches	26 wins	12 losses
By knockout	11	6
By submission	10	1
By decision	3	5
By disqualification	2	0
Draws	1	

Res.	Record	Opponent	Method	Event	Date	Round	Time	Location	Notes
Loss	26–12–1	Igor Pokrajac	KO (punches)	UFC 140	December 10, 2011	1	0:35	Toronto, Ontario, Canada	
Win	26–11–1	Mike Massenzio	Decision (unanimous)	UFC 131	June 11, 2011	3	5:00	Vancouver, British Columbia, Canada	
Win	25–11–1	Goran Reljic	Decision (unanimous)	UFC 122	November 13, 2010	3	5:00	Oberhausen, Germany	
Loss	24–11–1	Stephan Bonnar	TKO (knee and punches)	UFC 116	July 3, 2010	2	3:08	Las Vegas, Nevada, United States	Fight of the Night.
Win	24–10–1	Stephan Bonnar	TKO (doctor stoppage)	UFC 110	February 21, 2010	3	1:04	Sydney, Australia	
Loss	23–10–1	Brandon Vera	Decision (unanimous)	UFC 102	August 29, 2009	3	5:00	Portland, Oregon, United States	
Win	23–9–1	André Gusmão	KO (punches)	UFC 98	May 23, 2009	1	3:17	Las Vegas, Nevada, United States	
Win	22–9–1	Brian Stann	Submission (kimura)	UFC 97	April 18, 2009	1	3:53	Montreal, Quebec, Canada	Submission of the Night.
Win	21–9–1	Shane Primm	Submission (kimura)	The Ultimate Fighter: Team Nogueira vs. Team Mir Finale	December 13, 2008	2	3:27	Las Vegas, Nevada, United States	Submission of the Night.
Win	20–9–1	Marcus Hicks	Submission (kimura)	UCW 11: Hell in the Cage	April 11, 2008	1	N/A	Winnipeg, Manitoba, Canada	
Win	19–9–1	Alex Andrade	DQ (low blows)	Ring of Combat 18	March 7, 2008	2	4:46	New Jersey, United States	
Win	18–9–1	Robert Villegas	DQ (refusal to fight)	HDNet Fights: Reckless Abandon	December 15, 2007	2	3:15	Texas, United States	Return to Light Heavyweight.
Loss	17–9–1	Ben Rothwell	TKO (punches)	IFL: 2007 Semifinals	August 2, 2007	1	0:13	New Jersey, United States	
Loss	17–8–1	Reese Andy	Decision (split)	IFL: Everett	June 1, 2007	3	4:00	Everett, Washington, United States	
Win	17–7–1	Dan Christison	Decision (unanimous)	IFL: Los Angeles	March 17, 2007	3	4:00	California, United States	
Loss	16–7–1	Mike Whitehead	Decision (unanimous)	IFL: Championship Final	December 29, 2006	3	4:00	Connecticut, United States	
Win	16–6–1	Devin Cole	Submission (armbar)	IFL: World Championship Semifinals	November 2, 2006	2	1:14	Oregon, United States	
Win	15–6–1	Icho Larenas	TKO (doctor stoppage)	TKO 27: Reincarnation	September 29, 2006	3	0:00	Montreal, Quebec, Canada	
Win	14–6–1	Tom Howard	TKO (punches)	IFL: Portland	September 9, 2006	1	3:47	Portland, Oregon, United States	
Win	13–6–1	Yan Pellerin	Submission (kimura)	TKO 26: Heatwave	June 30, 2006	1	1:30	Quebec, Canada	
Loss	12–6–1	Ben Rothwell	TKO (punches)	IFL: Legends Championship 2006	April 29, 2006	1	3:59	New Jersey, United States	
Draw	12–5–1	Mike Kyle	Technical Draw	Strikeforce: Shamrock vs. Gracie	March 10, 2006	1	2:02	California, United States	Fight ruled a Technical Draw after accidental eye-poke from Kyle.
Loss	12–5	Brian Schall	TKO (punches)	TKO 24: Eruption	January 28, 2006	3	3:00	Quebec, Canada	Return to Heavyweight.
Loss	12–4	Martin Desilets	TKO (doctor stoppage)	TKO 23: Extreme	November 5, 2005	2	1:30	Quebec, Canada	
Loss	12–3	Matt Horwich	Submission (rear-naked choke)	Freedom Fight: Canada vs. USA	July 9, 2005	2	0:52	Quebec, Canada	Light Heavyweight debut.
Win	12–2	Ron Fields	Submission (armbar)	UCW 2: Caged Inferno	June 18, 2005	1	2:25	Winnipeg, Manitoba, Canada	
Win	11–2	Jason Day	TKO (punches)	RR 8: Roadhouse Rumble 8	April 9, 2005	1	2:08	Lethbridge, Alberta, Canada	
Win	10–2	Troy Hadley	TKO (punches)	NFA: Super Brawl	January 29, 2005	1	N/A	North Dakota, United States	
Win	9–2	Chris Thiel	KO (punches)	Ultimate Cage Wars 1	October 29, 2004	1	N/A	Winnipeg, Manitoba, Canada	
Win	8–2	Wyatt Lewis	KO (punches)	RITR 1: Rage in the Ring 1	October 23, 2004	1	N/A	Lethbridge, Alberta, Canada	
Win	7–2	Lee Mein	TKO (submission to punches)	WFF 7: Professional Shooto	July 23, 2004	2	2:06	Vancouver, British Columbia, Canada	
Loss	6–2	Chris Tuchscherer	Decision (unanimous)	NFA: Moorhead	June 12, 2004	3	3:00	Minnesota, United States	
Win	6–1	Dennis Stull	TKO (punches)	ICC: Trials 2	April 30, 2004	1	N/A	Minnesota, United States	
Win	5–1	Jack Burton	Submission (rear-naked choke)	ICC: Trials 2	April 30, 2004	1	N/A	Minnesota, United States	
Win	4–1	Matt Lafromboise	TKO (submission to punches)	DFC 1: Dakota Fighting Championships 1	April 17, 2004	1	1:14	North Dakota, United States	
Win	3–1	Kyle Olsen	Submission (exhaustion)	NFA: Best Damn Fights	March 20, 2004	1	4:55	North Dakota, United States	
Win	2–1	Ben Konecnec	TKO (punches)	IFA: Ultimate Trials	February 27, 2004	1	0:26	Iowa, United States	
Loss	1–1	Jason Day	Decision (unanimous)	RR 8: Roadhouse Rumble 8	November 1, 2003	2	5:00	Lethbridge, Alberta, Canada	
Win	1–0	Matt Lafromboise	TKO (submission to punches)	Absolute Ada Fights 4	September 13, 2003	1	3:23	Minnesota, United States	
