= André Gusmão =

Brazilian mixed martial artist (born 1977)

- Born: André Machado Gusmão; 19 May 1977 (age 49); Goiânia, Goiás, Brazil
- Height: 6 ft 2 in (188 cm)
- Weight: 185 lb (84 kg; 13 st 3 lb)
- Division: Middleweight; Light heavyweight
- Reach: 76 in (193 cm)
- Fighting out of: New York City, New York, U.S.
- Team: Renzo Gracie Academy
- Rank: Master in Capoeira; Black belt in Brazilian jiu-jitsu under Renzo Gracie
- Years active: 2006–2011

Mixed martial arts record
- Total: 9
- Wins: 6
- By knockout: 4
- By submission: 1
- By decision: 1
- Losses: 3
- By knockout: 2
- By decision: 1

Other information
- Mixed martial arts record from Sherdog

Medal record

Representing Brazil

Brazilian Jiu-Jitsu

Pan American No-Gi Championship
Silver medal – second place	2008; New York	Super Heavyweight
Gold medal – first place	2009 California	Super Heavyweight

André Machado Gusmão (born 19 May 1977) is a Brazilian former professional mixed martial artist who competed from 2006 to 2011. He competed in the light heavyweight division of the Ultimate Fighting Championship (UFC) in 2008 and 2009. Earlier in his career, Gusmão competed for the New York Pitbulls of the International Fight League, where his team won the IFL World Team Championship in 2007.

== Background ==
Gusmão was born on 19 May 1977, in Goiânia, Goiás, Brazil. He moved to New York in 2001, where he began teaching Capoeira, the first martial art he practiced. He started other classes at Renzo Gracie Academy in January 2007, training with Renzo Gracie, Ricardo Almeida, Eric Owings, and Muay Thai coach Joe Sampieri.

A longtime Brazilian jiu-jitsu practitioner, Gusmão notably faced Fabrício Werdum as a blue belt in the 100 kg division at the 2000 World IBJJF Jiu-Jitsu Championship, losing to Werdum in the final. Later, during his professional MMA career and after earning his black belt under Renzo Gracie, he competed at the 2008 Pan IBJJF Jiu-Jitsu No-Gi Championship, winning a silver medal. He competed again the following year, capturing the gold medal in the super heavyweight division.

== Mixed martial arts career ==
Gusmão began his professional career with a first-round knockout of John Swangler on 22 April 2006. After joining the International Fight League later that year, he would go on to defeat Mike Ciesnolevicz and Brent Beauparlant. In June 2007, he defeated Wojtek Kaszowski by second-round knockout. Replacing an injured Jamal Patterson for Renzo Gracie's New York Pitbulls, Gusmão again defeated Ciesnolevicz, clinching the 2007 IFL World Team Championship for the Pitbulls.

Following his success in the IFL, Gusmão signed with the Ultimate Fighting Championship (UFC) and was scheduled to make his promotional debut against Tomasz Drwal at UFC 87 on 9 August 2008. Less than two weeks before the event, Drwal withdrew for undisclosed reasons and was replaced by future UFC Light Heavyweight Champion Jon Jones in his UFC debut. Gusmão lost by unanimous decision.

Gusmão was scheduled to face Antonio Mendes at UFC 93, but the bout was canceled. He was later scheduled to face Houston Alexander at UFC 98 on 23 May 2009; Alexander withdrew due to injury and was replaced by Krzysztof Soszynski. Gusmão lost the fight by first-round knockout.

Following his stint in the UFC, Gusmão next faced Vagner Curió in a middleweight bout at Ring of Combat 28 on 19 February 2010, defeating him by TKO in the first round. In his final career fight, Gusmão faced Tim Williams at CFFC 7: No Mercy on 16 April 2011. He lost the bout by TKO in the third round.

== Personal life ==
Gusmão is a Capoeira instructor and runs a gym in Manhattan. In 2016, he opened the André Gusmão Academy in Miami, Florida, offering Brazilian jiu-jitsu, Muay Thai, and Capoeira classes for both children and adults.

== Championships and accomplishments ==
=== Mixed martial arts ===
- International Fight League
  - 2007 IFL World Team Championship (One time)

=== Brazilian jiu-jitsu ===
==== Black belt ====
- Pan IBJJF Jiu-Jitsu No-Gi Championship
  - (silver) 2008 – Super Heavyweight
  - (gold) 2009 – Super Heavyweight

==== Blue belt ====
- World IBJJF Jiu-Jitsu Championship
  - (silver) 2000 – Super Heavyweight

== Mixed martial arts record ==
Professional record breakdown
9 matches	6 wins	3 losses
By knockout	4	2
By submission	1	0
By decision	1	1

Res.	Record	Opponent	Method	Event	Date	Round	Time	Location	Notes
Loss	6–3	Tim Williams	TKO (punches)	CFFC 7: No Mercy	16 April 2011	3	0:16	Atlantic City, New Jersey, United States	
Win	6–2	Vagner Curió	TKO (submission to punches)	Ring of Combat 28	19 February 2010	1	3:25	Atlantic City, New Jersey, United States	
Loss	5–2	Krzysztof Soszynski	KO (punches)	UFC 98	23 May 2009	1	3:17	Las Vegas, Nevada, United States	
Loss	5–1	Jon Jones	Decision (unanimous)	UFC 87	9 August 2008	3	5:00	Minneapolis, Minnesota, United States	
Win	5–0	Mike Ciesnolevicz	KO (knee)	IFL: 2007 Team Championship Final	20 September 2007	1	0:53	Hollywood, Florida, United States	Won the IFL World Team Championship.
Win	4–0	Wojtek Kaszowski	Submission (rear-naked choke)	IFL: Las Vegas	16 June 2007	1	3:53	Las Vegas, Nevada, United States	
Win	3–0	Brent Beauparlant	Decision (unanimous)	IFL: Championship Final	29 December 2006	3	4:00	Uncasville, Connecticut, United States	
Win	2–0	Mike Ciesnolevicz	TKO (punches)	IFL: Gracie vs. Miletich	23 September 2006	2	1:02	Moline, Illinois, United States	
Win	1–0	John Swangler	TKO (punches)	SF 3: Beatdown	22 April 2006	1	0:13	New Jersey, United States	

== See also ==
- List of male mixed martial artists
