= Midwest Combat =

Mixed martial arts team participate in IFL event

Midwest Combat is one of the camps participating in the International Fight League. It is unknown who is coaching the camp at this time. Midwest Combat takes the place of the Chicago Red Bears which used to be coached by Igor Zinoviev.

Midwest Combat was established in 2008 when the IFL switched to a more camp based system then a team based system.

== Record/Roster ==
All records are IFL fights only

^{1}= fought when Tim Kennedy was at Light Heavyweight

^{2}= fought when Adam Maciejewski was at Heavyweight

^{3}= fought when Vladimir Matyushenko was with the Tokyo Sabres

^{4}= fought when Bart Palaszewski was with the Quad City Silverbacks

^{GP}= fought as part of the GP

IFL Team record as of 04/04/08: 2-1

CURRENT FIGHTERS AS OF 2008 SEASON:

- Bart Palaszewski (8-4) (LW)

def. John Shackelford by TKO in the 2nd round (4/29/06)^{4}

def Steve Bruno by KO in the first round (6/03/06)^{4}

def Marcio Feitosa by decision (split) (9/23/06)^{4}

def Ivan Menjivar by decision (split) (11/02/06)^{4}

def Ryan Schultz by KO in the third round (12/29/06)^{4}

lost to Chris Horodecki by decision (split) (02/02/07)^{4}

def John Gunderson by decision (split) (04/07/07)^{4}

def John Strawn by KO (punch) in the first round (05/19/07)^{4}

def Harris Sarmiento by submission (guillotine choke) in the third round (08/02/07)^{4}

lost to Deividas Taurosevicius by submission (armbar) in the second round (09/20/07)^{4}

lost to Chris Horodecki by decision (split) (11/03/07)^{GP4}

lost to Jim Miller by decision (unanimous) (04/04/08)

- Mark Miller (2-2) (WW)

lost to Delson Heleno by decision (unanimous) (02/23/07)

def Brad Blackburn by decision (unanimous) (04/07/07)

def Josh Neer by KO in the first round (05/19/07)

lost to Jay Hieron by TKO (strikes) in the first round (04/04/08)

- Brad Blackburn (4-2-) (WW)

Def Gustavo Machado by split decision (4/29/06)

Lost to Rory Markham by KO in the second round (6/03/06)

def Chris Wilson by unanimous decision (9/09/06)

Match against Condors' Rodrigo Ruas on 1/19/07 canceled due to an eye injury suffered by Ruas and an alternate bout between lightweights took place instead.

lost to Mark Miller by unanimous decision (04/07/07)

def Jay Hieron by KO (punch) in the first round (06/01/07)

Fight with Travis Cox was deemed a no contest after Blackburn accidentally kneed Cox in the head and he could not continue the fight (09/20/07)^{*}

def Delson Heleno by KO in the third round (04/04/08)

- Tim Kennedy (3-0) (MW)

def Dante Rivera by submission (strikes) in the second round (02/23/07)^{1}

def Ryan McGivern by submission (guillotine choke) in the second round (05/19/07)

def Elias Rivera by KO in the first round (12/29/07)^{GP}

=== IFL Light Heavyweight Champion ===
- Vladimir Matyushenko (6-0) (LHW)

def Dwayne Compton by submission (arm bar) in the first round (02/02/07)^{3}

def Justin Levin by TKO (strikes) in the first round (03/17/07)^{3}

def Aaron Stark by TKO (strikes) in the first round (06/01/07)^{3}

def Tim Boetsch by decision (unanimous) (08/02/07)^{3}

def Alex Schoenauer by decision (unanimous) to become the first IFL Light Heavyweight Champion (11/03/07)^{GP3}

def Jamal Patterson by TKO (strikes) in the second round (04/04/08)

== 2008 Season Schedule/ Results ==
Date	Opponent	Result
April 4, 2008	Renzo Gracie Academy	W 2-1
