= Christian M'Pumbu =

Congolese mixed martial arts fighter

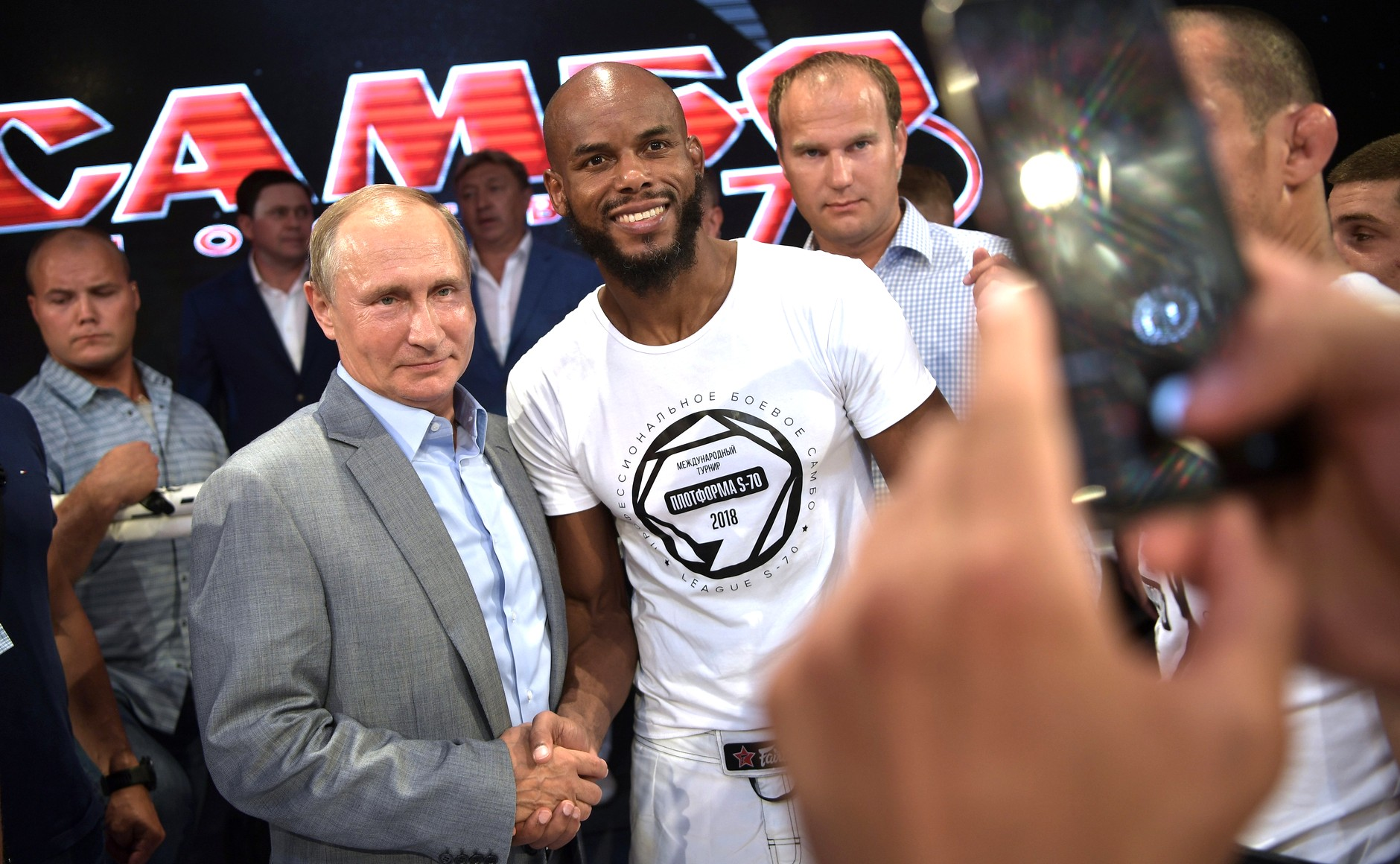
- Born: June 2, 1977 (age 49); Kinshasa, Zaire (now Democratic Republic of the Congo)
- Other names: Tonton
- Nationality: Congolese; French
- Height: 6 ft 3 in (1.91 m)
- Weight: 201 1/2 lb (91 kg; 14 st 6 lb)
- Division: Light Heavyweight
- Reach: 78 in (198 cm)
- Style: Savate, Judo
- Fighting out of: Paris, France
- Team: MMA Factory; Yogaka Fight Team; Jucao Achille Team
- Years active: 2004–present

Mixed martial arts record
- Total: 33
- Wins: 21
- By knockout: 9
- By submission: 8
- By decision: 3
- By disqualification: 1
- Losses: 11
- By knockout: 3
- By submission: 2
- By decision: 6
- Draws: 1

Other information
- Mixed martial arts record from Sherdog

Christian M'Pumbu (born June 2, 1977) is a French-Congolese professional mixed martial artist. He was the inaugural Bellator Light Heavyweight Champion.

== Background ==
M'Pumbu was born in Kinshasa, Zaire (now known as the Democratic Republic of the Congo). He currently resides in France.

== Mixed martial arts career ==
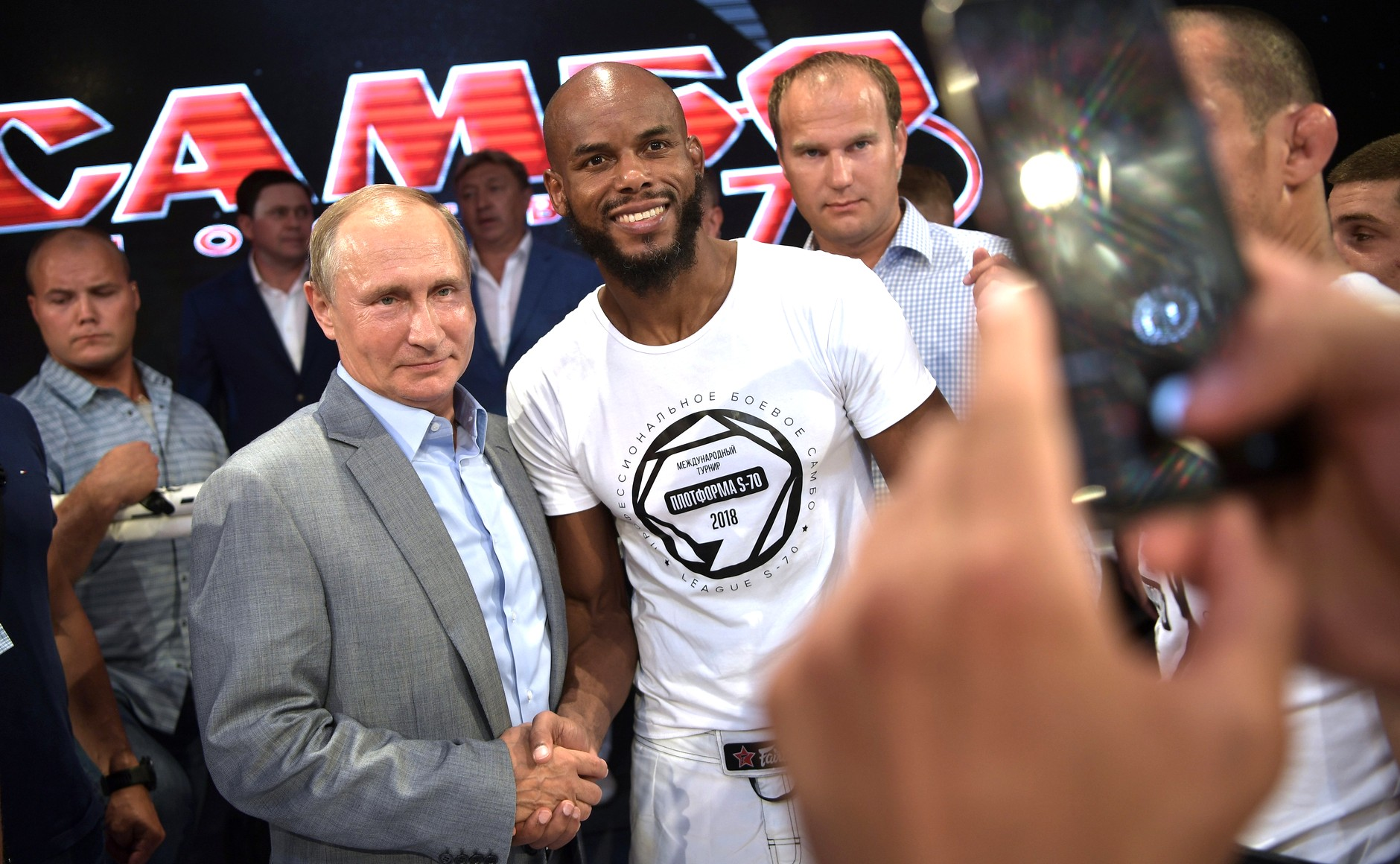
M'Pumbu with Russian President Vladimir Putin, 23 August 2018

M'Pumbu made his professional mixed martial arts (MMA) debut in 2004. He has fought primarily in Europe for various promotions including KSW and M-1 Global. He is currently a member of Team France in M-1 Mixfight.

Before his debut in the United States, M'Pumbu amassed a record of 15 wins, 3 losses and 1 draw. A notable win from this period is over Ultimate Fighting Championship heavyweight contender Stefan Struve.

=== Bellator Fighting Championships ===
M'Pumbu made his U.S. MMA debut on March 26, 2011, at Bellator 38. He faced Chris Davis in the opening round of the Light Heavyweight tournament and won the fight via TKO in the third round. In the semi-finals he defeated Tim Carpenter via TKO in the first round. M'Pumbu would go on to defeat Rich Hale via TKO in the third round at the finals of the season 4 tournament, becoming the inaugural Bellator Light Heavyweight champion. He was unofficially dubbed the first African born mixed martial artist to hold a title in a major MMA organization.

On October 22, 2011, at Bellator 55, M'Pumbu lost a non-title fight against Travis Wiuff via unanimous decision. On February 28, 2013, at Bellator 91 M'Pumbu faced Bellator 2012 Summer Series Light Heavyweight tournament winner Attila Vegh in his first title defense and lost via unanimous decision.

On September 13, 2013, at Bellator 99, M'Pumbu was expected to face UFC veteran Vladimir Matyushenko. M'Pumbu pulled out of the fight with a hand injury and was replaced with Houston Alexander.

M'Pumbu faced Quinton Jackson in the opening round of Bellator's Season 10 Light Heavyweight tournament in the main event at Bellator 110 on February 28, 2014. He lost the fight via knockout in the first round, the first knockout loss of his career.

M'Pumbu made his Middleweight debut against Kendall Grove on October 3, 2014, at Bellator 127. He lost the fight via submission in the second round.

== Championships and accomplishments ==
- Bellator Fighting Championships
  - Bellator Light Heavyweight World Championship (One time; First)
  - Bellator Season 4 Light Heavyweight Tournament Winner
- Union of Peresvit
  - Star of Peresvit Openweight Tournament Winner
  - Fire of Persevit Openweight Tournament Winner

== Mixed martial arts record ==
Professional record breakdown
33 matches	21 wins	11 losses
By knockout	9	3
By submission	8	2
By decision	3	6
By disqualification	1	0
Draws	1	

Res.	Record	Opponent	Method	Event	Date	Round	Time	Location	Notes
Loss	21–11–1	Stanislav Klybik	KO (head kick)	League S-70 - Plotforma S-70: 2018	August 22, 2018	1	4:45	Sochi, Russia	
Loss	21–10–1	Mikhail Ragozin	Decision (unanimous)	RCC 2: Battles in the Cage	February 24, 2018	3	5:00	Chelyabinsk, Russia	
Loss	21–9–1	Ivan Shtyrkov	Decision (unanimous)	RCC 1: Battles in the Cage	November 11, 2017	3	5:00	Yekaterinburg, Russia	
Win	21–8–1	Sergio Souza	DQ (punches after stoppage)	Magnum Fighting Championship 1	April 8, 2017	1	0:40	Rome, Italy	
Win	20–8–1	Sebastien Huot Marchand	TKO (arm injury)	ADW: Road to Abu Dhabi 3	August 12, 2016	2	2:12	Bangkok, Thailand	
Loss	19–8–1	Denis Stojnic	TKO (punches)	HIT Fighting Championship 2	May 28, 2016	2	1:36	Zurich, Switzerland	For the HIT Heavyweight Championship.
Win	19–7–1	Ramis Teregulov	KO (punch)	World Warriors Fighting Championship: CE 4	September 19, 2015	2	3:37	Paris, France	
Loss	18–7–1	Kendall Grove	Submission (rear-naked choke)	Bellator 127	October 3, 2014	2	4:14	Temecula, California, United States	Middleweight debut. Bellator Middleweight title eliminator.
Loss	18–6–1	Quinton Jackson	KO (punches)	Bellator 110	February 28, 2014	1	4:34	Uncasville, Connecticut, United States	Bellator Season 10 Light Heavyweight Tournament Semifinal.
Loss	18–5–1	Attila Végh	Decision (unanimous)	Bellator 91	February 28, 2013	5	5:00	Rio Rancho, New Mexico, United States	Lost the Bellator Light Heavyweight World Championship.
Loss	18–4–1	Travis Wiuff	Decision (unanimous)	Bellator 55	October 22, 2011	3	5:00	Yuma, Arizona, United States	Non-title bout
Win	18–3–1	Rich Hale	TKO (punches)	Bellator 45	May 21, 2011	3	4:17	Lake Charles, Louisiana, United States	Bellator Season 4 Light Heavyweight Tournament Final. Won the inaugural Bellator Light Heavyweight World Championship.
Win	17–3–1	Tim Carpenter	TKO (punches)	Bellator 42	April 23, 2011	1	2:08	Concho, Oklahoma, United States	Bellator Season 4 Light Heavyweight Tournament Semifinal.
Win	16–3–1	Chris Davis	TKO (punches)	Bellator 38	March 26, 2011	3	3:34	Tunica, Mississippi, United States	Bellator Season 4 Light Heavyweight Tournament Quarterfinal.
Loss	15–3–1	Yoshiyuki Nakanishi	Decision (split)	Deep: 47 Impact	April 17, 2010	2	5:00	Tokyo, Japan	DEEP Light Heavyweight Tournament Semifinal.
Win	15–2–1	Yuji Sakuragi	TKO (punches)	Deep: 46 Impact	February 28, 2010	1	2:29	Tokyo, Japan	DEEP Light Heavyweight Tournament Quarterfinal.
Win	14–2–1	Hideto Tatsumi	TKO (punches)	M-1 Challenge 18: Netherlands Day One	August 15, 2009	2	4:53	Hilversum, Netherlands	
Win	13–2–1	Krzysztof Kulak	Decision (unanimous)	Multi Boxes: 1er Gala International	June 26, 2009	2	5:00	Paris, France	
Win	12–2–1	Enoc Solves Torres	Submission (armbar)	M-1 Challenge 14: Japan	April 29, 2009	1	4:59	Tokyo, Japan	
Draw	11–2–1	Leonardo Nascimento Lucio	Draw	100% fight 1	January 10, 2009	3	5:00	Paris, France	
Win	11–2	Marcus Vanttinen	Submission (rear-naked choke)	M-1 Challenge 10: Finland	November 26, 2008	1	2:15	Helsinki, Finland	
Loss	10–2	Jan Błachowicz	Submission (armbar)	KSW Extra	September 13, 2008	2	3:12	Dąbrowa Górnicza, Poland	
Win	10–1	Barry Guerin	TKO (punches)	M-1 Challenge 5: Japan	July 17, 2008	1	0:32	Tokyo, Japan	
Loss	9–1	Fabio Fernandes	Decision (unanimous)	Fite Selektor	March 13, 2008	2	5:00	Dubai City, United Arab Emirates	
Win	9–0	Denis Sobolev	Submission (rear-naked choke)	Star of Peresvit	December 7, 2007	1	1:20	Kyiv, Ukraine	Star of Peresvit Openweight Tournament Final
Win	8–0	Stefan Struve	Submission (D'arce choke)	Star of Peresvit	December 7, 2007	1	2:05	Kyiv, Ukraine	Star of Peresvit Openweight Tournament Semifinal
Win	7–0	Aleksey Gonchar	Decision	Star of Peresvit	December 7, 2007	2	5:00	Kyiv, Ukraine	Star of Peresvit Openweight Tournament Quarterfinal.
Win	6–0	Sergey Mukhamedshin	Submission (guillotine choke)	M-1 MFC: International Mix Fight	March 17, 2007	1	1:25	St. Petersburg, Russia	
Win	5–0	Vladimir Shemarov	Decision	Fire of Persevit	December 2, 2006	2	5:00	Kyiv, Ukraine	Fire of Persevit Openweight Tournament Final.
Win	4–0	Valdas Pocevicius	Submission (rear-naked choke)	Fire of Persevit	December 2, 2006	1	1:48	Kyiv, Ukraine	Fire of Persevit Openweight Tournament Semifinal.
Win	3–0	Denis Bublov	Submission (rear-naked choke)	Fire of Persevit	December 2, 2006	1	2:20	Kyiv, Ukraine	Fire of Persevit Openweight Tournament Quarterfinal
Win	2–0	Dramane Traore	Submission (rear-naked choke)	Xtreme Gladiators 2	March 11, 2006	2	2:40	Paris, France	
Win	1–0	Kuljit Degun	KO (punches)	UKMMAC 7: Rage & Fury	May 30, 2004	1	0:32	Essex, England	
