= Hammond, Illinois =

Hammond
- Village
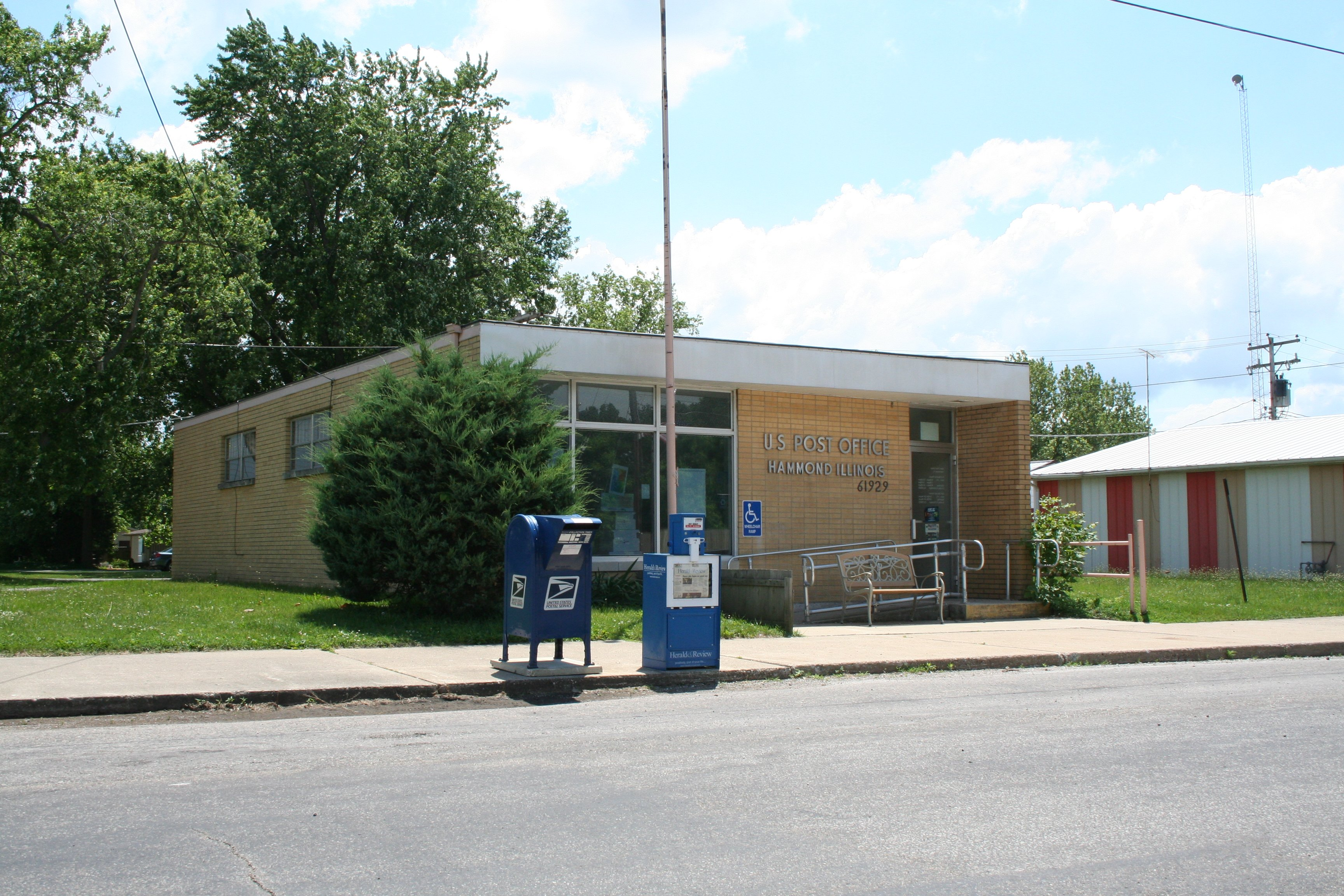
- Hammond Post Office

- Location of Hammond in Piatt County, Illinois.
- Coordinates: 39°47′58″N 88°35′32″W
- Country: United States
- State: Illinois
- County: Piatt
- Township: Unity

Area
  - Total: 0.76 sq mi (1.96 km^{2})
  - Land: 0.76 sq mi (1.96 km^{2})
  - Water: 0 sq mi (0.00 km^{2})
- Elevation: 673 ft (205 m)

Population (2020)
  - Total: 508
  - Density: 671.4/sq mi (259.22/km^{2})
- Time zone: UTC-6 (CST)
  - Summer (DST): UTC-5 (CDT)
- ZIP code: 61929
- Area code: 217
- FIPS code: 17-32499
- GNIS ID: 2398233
- Website: villageofhammond.com

Hammond is a village in Piatt County, Illinois, United States. The population was 508 at the 2020 census.

== History ==
Hammond was named for Charles Goodrich Hammond, a railroad official.

== Geography ==
According to the 2010 census, Hammond has a total area of 0.761 square miles (1.97 km^{2}), of which 0.76 square miles (1.97 km^{2}) (or 99.87%) is land and 0.001 square miles (0.00 km^{2}) (or 0.13%) is water.

== Demographics ==
Historical population
Census	Pop.	Note	%±
1880	216		—
1900	481		—
1910	492		2.3%
1920	459		−6.7%
1930	470		2.4%
1940	384		−18.3%
1950	405		5.5%
1960	471		16.3%
1970	502		6.6%
1980	556		10.8%
1990	527		−5.2%
2000	518		−1.7%
2010	509		−1.7%
2020	508		−0.2%
U.S. Decennial Census

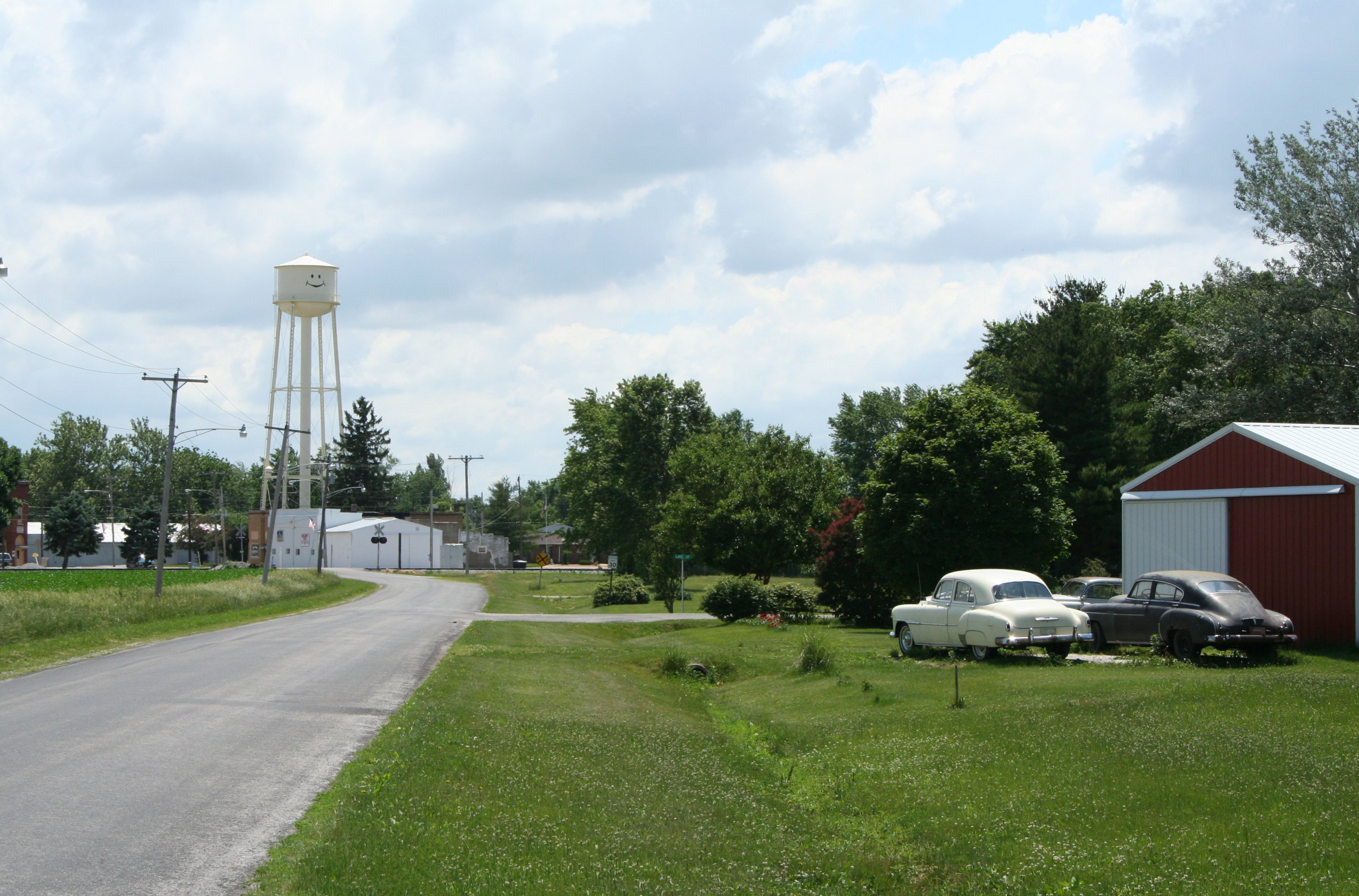
A smiley face adorns the north side of the Hammond, Illinois water tower. It says Hammond on its south side.

As of the census of 2000, there were 518 people, 225 households, and 141 families residing in the village. The population density was 679.8 inhabitants per square mile (262.5/km^{2}). There were 244 housing units at an average density of 320.2 per square mile (123.6/km^{2}). The racial makeup of the village was 98.26% White, 0.58% African American, 0.19% Native American, 0.19% Asian, 0.58% from other races, and 0.19% from two or more races. Hispanic or Latino of any race were 0.19% of the population.

There were 225 households, out of which 24.9% had children under the age of 18 living with them, 55.6% were married couples living together, 5.3% had a female householder with no husband present, and 36.9% were non-families. 32.4% of all households were made up of individuals, and 15.1% had someone living alone who was 65 years of age or older. The average household size was 2.30 and the average family size was 2.95.

In the village, the population was spread out, with 23.6% under the age of 18, 6.9% from 18 to 24, 27.6% from 25 to 44, 24.7% from 45 to 64, and 17.2% who were 65 years of age or older. The median age was 39 years. For every 100 females, there were 111.4 males. For every 100 females age 18 and over, there were 102.0 males.

The median income for a household in the village was $45,833, and the median income for a family was $51,528. Males had a median income of $33,523 versus $21,667 for females. The per capita income for the village was $19,313. About 2.1% of families and 7.1% of the population were below the poverty line, including 11.5% of those under age 18 and 11.1% of those age 65 or over.
