= International Fight League =

Mixed martial arts promoter based in US

- Sport: Mixed martial arts
- Founded: January 7, 2006
- Folded: July 31, 2008
- CEO: Jay Larkin
- No. of teams: 10
- Last champion: New York Pitbulls

The International Fight League was an American mixed martial arts (MMA) promotion billed as the world's first MMA league. It was founded on January 7, 2006, and closed on July 31, 2008. Instead of the established norm for MMA events, where matchups are strictly one-on-one affairs, each IFL card was a showdown between two camps of at least three fighters, each fighter fighting one match against another in the opposing camps.

== History ==
The IFL was founded on January 7, 2006, by real estate developer Kurt Otto and Wizard magazine founder Gareb Shamus, two well-financed devotees of mixed martial arts who were inspired by the Mark Kerr documentary The Smashing Machine. With the IFL, they intended to create a system not only to showcase mixed martial arts action but also provide a business plan that would allow fighters a greater share of profits. In marked contrast to the rest of the industry, instead of paying fighters only purses after fights, the IFL paid them a salary and health benefits while they trained and fought. The team concept was intended to be conducive for television, where episodes could be regularly produced.

It had been widely speculated that the IFL, with the deep pockets of its founders, a television deal and an innovative business plan, would become a major circuit for MMA in North America, directly competing with the Ultimate Fighting Championship. The UFC and IFL had a hostile relationship, as the UFC accused the IFL of and sued them for illegally using proprietary information obtained by hiring executives from the UFC organization. The IFL shot back with their own suit claiming the UFC was threatening potential partners not to work with the IFL, including Fox Sports Net (a deal with Fox Sports was later signed before resolution of the suit). The tension between the IFL and the UFC worsened with accusations that the IFL has attempted to buy out several top UFC fighters.

The inaugural event was held on April 29, 2006, at the Trump Taj Mahal in Atlantic City, New Jersey, featuring the Quad City Silverbacks vs the Los Angeles Anacondas and the Seattle Tiger Sharks vs the New York Pitbulls, with a superfight between Jens Pulver and Cole Escovedo.

On August 31, 2006, publicly traded (OTCBB) company, Paligent Inc., principally held by New Jersey developer and real estate industrialist Richard J. Kurtz, authorized a merger agreement that coincided with its acquisition of the IFL. The IFL became the parent entity as Paligent agreed to change its name to International Fight League, Inc. Subsequently, on November 29, 2006, the IFL became a publicly traded company, under the symbol IFLI. Their market capitalization as of 2006 was around $150 million. In September 2007, Kurtz sold his interest in the IFL.

=== Changes in 2008 ===
On December 20, 2007, IFL Commissioner Kurt Otto made an announcement regarding some major changes for the 2008 season. First and foremost, the team concept would be changed to instead focus on distinct MMA camps. Otto reasoned that many of the teams did not train together, nor did many of them live in the respective cities they represented. Instead, the new concept of the IFL would focus on camps and the fighters that already trained in those camps. Also changing will be the five-on-five format to a more simplified three-on-three format. This was designed to allow more flexibility in matchmaking, as the teams would not be confined to picking one fighter in each weight class. Instead the three fighters could be from any weight class or they could all be from the same class. The "team" concept would still be somewhat intact as the camps would compete with each other for points in a final standing. Otto also announced that the IFL would extend an open invitation to any camps not already affiliated with the IFL to participate in "one off" events, where a non-IFL camp could challenge an IFL camp for supremacy. Similarly, any of the title defenses could also involve fighters who were not currently signed with the IFL in a "one off" fight. Otto announced that there would be eight shows in 2008 with no plans for a GP final.

On May 8, 2008, the IFL revealed during a conference call that their August 15, 2008, event would feature the debut of a six-sided cage called "The Hex." This event was cancelled due to the company's financial problems, and no announcement was made in regards to when or if it would resume full-scale operations again.

In July 2008, there were reports of the IFL's possible purchase by the UFC. That same month, Joe Favorito, former IFL senior vice president, cited financial troubles for the closing of the company on July 31, 2008. Anonymous sources stated that parent company of the UFC, Zuffa, had bought the IFL. Other reports cited the UFC's airing of IFL footage on its programming, and the signing of previous IFL fighters, as an indirect confirmation of the purchase.

=== 2008 season ===
The 2008 International Fight League season was to have had at the minimum eight events which would be based out of three main sites; Las Vegas, New Jersey and Connecticut. Each event would have two camps competing each other in three on three match-ups while at least two titles would be defended at every event (allowing each fight card to have a minimum of eight fights each).

A planned August 15 event was canceled due to the company's financial condition as mentioned in a June 10 press release. The IFL subsequently ceased all operations.

Date	Venue	Location	Camp Matches	Title Fights	Results
February 29, 2008	Orleans Arena	Las Vegas, Nevada	Team Tompkins Vs World Class Fight Center; Lions Den Vs Team Quest	Ryan Schultz Vs John Gunderson; Matt Horwich Vs Ryan McGivern^{*} Roy Nelson Vs Fabiano Scherner	World Class Fight Center def Team Tompkins; Team Quest def Lions Den; Ryan Schultz def John Gunderson; Ryan McGivern def Matt Horwich; Roy Nelson def Fabiano Scherner
April 4, 2008	Izod Center	East Rutherford, New Jersey	American Top Team Vs Miletich Fighting Systems; Midwest Combat Vs Renzo Gracie Academy	Wagnney Fabiano Vs Shad Lierley; Jay Hieron Vs Mark Miller; Vladimir Matyushenko Vs Jamal Patterson	American Top Team Vs Miletich Fighting Systems (draw); Midwest Combat def Renzo Gracie Academy; Wagnney Fabiano def Shad Lierley; Jay Hieron def Mark Miller; Vladimir Matyushenko def Jamal Patterson
May 16, 2008	Mohegan Sun Arena	Uncasville, Connecticut	World Class Fight Center Vs Team Bomb Squad; Team Prodigy Vs Team Quest	Roy Nelson Vs Brad Imes; Ryan McGivern Vs Dan Miller; Ryan Schultz Vs Deividas Taurosevicius	Roy Nelson def Brad Imes; Dan Miller def Ryan McGivern; Ryan Schultz def Deividas Taurosevicius

^{*} Originally Tim Kennedy was supposed to face Horwich for the IFL Middleweight title but Kennedy was called away to serve in the armed forces. Militech fighter Ryan McGivern took his place.

== Television ==
In 2007, the IFL made a television deal with Fox Sports Net and MyNetworkTV. This made it the first MMA promotion to appear regularly on broadcast TV in the United States.

The premiere of IFL Battleground on March 12, 2007, on MyNetworkTV scored a 0.8 household rating (1.12 million viewers), and gained 250% in all key male demographics (0.7 vs. 0.2) over February. This represented a new MyNetworkTV high for male 18–34, a 17% rise over the previous record of 0.6. However this episode was criticized by MMA journalists and fans, saying it glorified violence and brutality. Kurt Otto apologized to fans, their fighters and coaches, and critics for the content of that show, and that "we made a mistake with some parts of the show, but we will learn from this and grow."

On February 5, 2008, the IFL announced a partnership with the HDNet to air the first three events of their 2008 season live.

On February 15, 2008, MyNetworkTV cancelled IFL Battleground.

== Camps ==
The IFL consisted of nine camps, all owned by the league, and each coached by a veteran MMA fighter. Originally the IFL had teams that were associated with cities but that proved to be a lark as many of the teams did not train in their respective cities nor did all the fighters live in those cities as well. Thus in 2008 the IFL changed the format to revolve around existing camps and their established fighters. The camps for this season were as follows:

Camps for the 2008 season
Camp	Coach
Team Tompkins formerly known as the Los Angeles Anacondas (Was called Xtreme Couture but had to change name due to lack of fighters from Xtreme Couture)	Shawn Tompkins
Renzo Gracie Academy formerly known as the New York Pitbulls	Renzo Gracie
Miletich Fighting Systems formerly known as the Quad City Silverbacks	Pat Miletich
Team Quest formerly known as the Portland Wolfpack	Matt Lindland
Ruas Vale Tudo formerly known as the Southern California Condors	Marco Ruas
Lions Den formerly known as the Nevada Lions	Ken Shamrock
Midwest Combat formerly known as the Chicago Red Bears	Igor Zinoviev
World Class Fight Center^{5}	Mario Sperry
Team Bombsquad	Ryan Citolli
Team Prodigy	Hector Pena
Camp based out of Britain^{6}	Ian Freeman

Former Teams
Team	Coach
San Jose Razorclaws^{7}	Frank Shamrock
Toronto Dragons	Carlos Newton
Tokyo Sabres	Ken Yasuda
Tucson Scorpions	Don Frye
Seattle Tiger Sharks	Maurice Smith

Camps outside of IFL
Team	Coach
American Top Team	Ricardo Liborio

^{1} Antonio Inoki was originally going to be the Tokyo Sabres' coach and mentor but has since been dropped by the IFL. Japanese bodybuilder Ken Yasuda is now the head coach.

- Future teams announced at the IFL event at the MARK of the Quad Cities will be coached by Don Frye (Scorpions) and Marco Ruas (Piranhas) and based in Arizona and Southern California respectively.
- On 11/2/06 the IFL announced two new teams to join the IFL ranks. Recently retired and former UFC superstar Ken Shamrock will coach the Northern California Lions. British MMA legend Ian Freeman was announced as the coach to the British-based British Bulldogs.
- 11/06 the IFL announced the 12th and final team of the 2007 season, the Chicago-based Red Bears who will be coached by Russian MMA fighter Igot Zinoviev. The team, though based in Chicago, will be composed mostly of Russian fighters (somewhat similar to the Renzo Gracie-led NY Pitbulls who are composed mostly of Brazilian fighters)
- 11/06 The Southern California Piranhas apparently changed their name to the Orange County Condors as well as the Northern California Lions are now being relocated to Nevada.

² The Bulldogs will participate in a few matches in 2007 but won't start officially for the IFL until the 2008 season. The San Diego, France, South Korea and Brazil teams have yet to have a team logo and name.

- 12/06 The IFL confirmed that four new teams will take part in extra league events during the 2007 season (similar to the British Bulldogs status). One team will be led by BJJ specialist Mario Sperry and will be based in Brazil, a team based in San Diego will be led by PRIDE superstar Dan Henderson, K-1 superstar Jerome Le Banner will lead a team based in France, and Olympic Judoka Doo B. Park will lead a team based in Korea. None of the teams have names yet.

³ At the 3/17 show in LA, Bas Rutten stepped down from being the coach of the LA Anacondas to become the "face/spokesperson" of the IFL as well as the co-host of the "IFL Battleground" show on MYnetwork TV. Rutten was replaced by assistant coach Shawn Tompkins.

^{4} On 9/13/07 it was announced by the IFL that Shawn Tompkins was let go from the IFL and removed from his duties as coach for the Los Angeles Anacondas. Reasoning was that Tompkins has "spread himself to thin" between his duties of coaching the Anacondas and becoming a new trainer at the Randy Couture owned gym in Las Vegas. A replacement has yet to be named.

^{5} On 9/20/07 IFL commissioner Kurt Otto announced in an interview that the IFL will stay at 12 teams in the 2008 season with one or more franchises moving from their current location and at least one of them closing down. To replace the closing team will be a team coached by Mario Sperry based in either Florida or Las Vegas.

^{6} On 9/25/07 IFL commissioner Kurt Otto reiterated that in the 2008 season there will only be 12 teams in the IFL with TWO new teams emerging. One of them coached by the already mentioned Marrio Sperry and the other by Cage Rage veteran Ian Freeman.

^{7} On 10/10/07 Frank Shamrock revealed that he and his team, the San Jose Razorclaws, were let go from the IFL. Shamrock thought that Razorclaw Brian Foster might still be offered a stay in the IFL but will join a different team due to his successful 2007 season and his entrance into the 2007 GP.

== IFL world team champions ==
- 2006(first half)- Quad City Silverbacks
- 2006(second half)- Quad City Silverbacks
- 2007- New York Pitbulls

== IFL individual champions ==
Division	Champion	Camp	Since	Title Defenses
Heavyweight	(United States) Roy Nelson	Lions Den	Dec 29, 2007	2
Light Heavyweight	(Belarus) Vladimir Matyushenko	Midwest Combat	Nov 03, 2007	1
Middleweight	(United States) Dan Miller	Renzo Gracie Academy	May 16, 2008	0
Welterweight	(United States) Jay Hieron	Team Tompkins	Dec 29, 2007	1
Lightweight	(United States) Ryan Schultz	Team Quest	Dec 29, 2007	2
Featherweight	(Brazil) Wagnney Fabiano	Toronto Dragons	Dec 29, 2007	1

== Grand prix ==
In order to appease the many MMA critics who felt that the team concept the IFL displayed had no place in the one-on-one sport of MMA, the IFL decided to conduct an end of the year Grand Prix which would take the four best fighters of each weight class to fight it out in a mini tournament that would be conducted over two events.

The first event took place on November 3, 2007, and the second on December 29, 2007. Each Grand Prix winner was crowned the first IFL champion of their weight class and awarded titles to defend during the 2008 season.

- 2007 IFL Grand Prix

== IFL schedules/seasons ==
- 2006 International Fight League
- 2007 International Fight League
- 2008 International Fight League

== IFL draft ==
As announced on September 25, 2007, the IFL underwent their very first IFL draft to find new talent to fill the ranks of fighters that were cut from their IFL contracts (due to poor records). The draft took place in the three different locations on October 13, 2007.

== Super fights ==
Along with the traditional five on five team system matches the IFL also has occasional super fights between various fighters that do not count towards any team system and may include fighters not associated with any IFL team. So far these superfights have occurred along with their results:

- Jens Pulver def Cole Escovedo by KO in 56 seconds of the first round (4/29/06)
- Ben Uker def Travis Doerge by submission (key lock) in 2:10 of the first round (6/03/06)
- Chris Horodecki def Erik Owings by KO in 4 minutes of the first round (6/03/06)
- Jay Hieron def Jake Ellenberger by unanimous decision (6/03/06)
- Jamal Patterson def Alex Schoenauer by submission (guillotine choke) 2:32 in the first round (6/03/06)
- Daniel Gracie def Wes Sims by technical submission (rear naked choke) 2:42 in the first round (6/03/06)
- Matt Lindland def Jeremy Horn by TKO (Strikes) 0:21 in the second round (9/09/06)
- Renzo Gracie def Pat Miletich by submission (guillotine choke) 3:37 in the first round (9/23/06)
- Allan Goes def Daniel Gracie by TKO (Strikes) 1:03 in the second round (11/02/06)
- Mike Whitehead def Mark Kerr by TKO (strikes) 2:40 in the first round (11/02/06)
- Erik Owings def Ed West by decision (unanimous) (12/29/06)
- André Gusmão def Brent Beauparlant by decision (unanimous) (12/29/06)
- Reese Andy def Jamal Patterson by TKO (ref stoppage) 3:24 in the second round (12/29/06)
- Daniel Markes def Tyrie Johnson by KO 1:03 in the first round (12/30/06)
- Mike Whitehead def Krzysztof Soszynski by decision (unanimous) (12/29/06)
- Renzo Gracie def Carlos Newton by decision (split) (12/29/06)
- Jeremy Horn def Falaniko Vitale by decision (split) (01/19/07)
- Matt Lindland def Carlos Newton by submission (guillotine choke) 1:43 in the second round (2/2/07)
- Robbie Lawler def Eduardo Pamplona by TKO (ref. stoppage) 1:36 in the third round (2/23/07)
- Jeff Curran def Kevin English by submission (guillotine choke) 1:12 in the second round (4/7/07)
- Maurice Smith def Marco Ruas by TKO (Towel) at 3:43 into the fourth round (5/19/07)
- Lyman Good def Mike Dolce by decision (unanimous) (08/02/07)
- Dante Rivera def Nissim Levy by TKO (strikes) at 1:15 of the third round (08/02/07)

== Rules ==
The IFL followed the Unified Rules of Mixed Martial Arts established by the New Jersey Athletic Board, with several exceptions. In addition, the IFL was also sanctioned by the *ISCF - International Sport Combat Federation

- Matches consist of three rounds of four minutes instead of the usual five,
- Elbow strikes are not allowed to the face or head,
- If the match is initially scored a draw after three rounds, there will be a three-minute sudden victory round to decide a winner.

=== Ring ===
In contrast with most mixed martial arts promotions in the United States, the IFL staged their fights in a five-roped ring similar to the one used in PRIDE.

On 5/08/08 the IFL announced the unveiling of a new six sided ring that would have been used for the IFL. Nicknamed the "hex", the ring was created by Throwdown, an MMA equipment manufacturer. The ring would have been allowed more surface area to fight and gives fans a better view of the action. This never came to fruition as the IFL soon folded.

=== Weight classes ===
The IFL used six weight classes:

- Featherweight: (136-145 lb.)
- Lightweight: (146–155 lb.)
- Welterweight: (156–170 lb.)
- Middleweight: (171–185 lb.)
- Light Heavyweight: (186–205 lb.)
- Heavyweight: (206–265 lb.)

There are three other weight classes specified in the Unified Rules which the IFL does not use: flyweight (125 lb. and below), bantamweight (126–135 lb.), and super heavyweight (266 lb. and above).

== See also ==
- Mixed Martial Arts
- List of IFL champions
