= Chris Davis (fighter) =

American mixed martial arts (MMA) fighter

- Born: November 18, 1982 (age 43); Gadsden, Alabama, United States
- Other names: The Professional
- Height: 6 ft 0 in (1.83 m)
- Weight: 205 lb (93 kg; 14.6 st)
- Division: Light Heavyweight
- Fighting out of: Gadsden, Alabama, United States
- Team: Headhunters MMA
- Years active: 2008-2013

Mixed martial arts record
- Total: 16
- Wins: 10
- By knockout: 5
- By submission: 5
- Losses: 6
- By knockout: 4
- By submission: 2

Other information
- Mixed martial arts record from Sherdog

Chris Davis (born November 18, 1982) is a retired American mixed martial artist. A professional from 2008 until 2013, he fought in Bellator.

== Background ==
Born and raised in Alabama, Davis is a former Marine.

== Mixed martial arts career ==
=== Early career ===
A professional mixed martial artist since 2008, Davis spent the majority of his earlier fights is smaller organizations, where he would face the likes of Jeremy Horn and Vinny Magalhães. By April 23, 2010, Davis had compiled a record of 10 wins and 2 losses.

=== Bellator Fighting Championships ===
Davis signed with Bellator in February 2011. Davis took part in the Season Four Light Heavyweight Tournament Quarterfinal at Bellator 38 against Christian M'Pumbu. He lost the fight via TKO at 3:34 in round 3.

Over a year later, Davis would return to the Bellator cage when he faced seasoned veteran Travis Wiuff at Bellator 71. Davis lost the fight via TKO in the first round.

=== Independent promotions ===
After his short stint in Bellator, Davis faced William Hill at Rogue Warrior Championships 3 on September 6, 2012. Davis lost the fight via TKO in the first round.

Davis next faced Teddy Holder at Strike Hard Productions 28 on August 10, 2013. Davis lost the fight via TKO in the first round, marking Davis' fourth consecutive loss via form of TKO.

== Personal life ==
Davis currently works as a Public Adjuster for the Noble Public Adjusting Group.

== Mixed martial arts record ==
Professional record breakdown
16 matches	10 wins	6 losses
By knockout	5	4
By submission	5	2
By decision	0	0

Res.	Record	Opponent	Method	Event	Date	Round	Time	Location	Notes
Loss	10–6	Terry Holder	TKO (punches)	Strike Hard Productions 28	August 10, 2013	1	3:18	Birmingham, Alabama, United States	
Loss	10–5	William Hill	TKO (punches)	Rogue Warrior Championships 3	September 6, 2012	1	4:46	Green Bay, Wisconsin	
Loss	10–4	Travis Wiuff	TKO (punches)	Bellator 71	June 22, 2012	1	4:19	Chester, West Virginia	
Loss	10–3	Christian M'Pumbu	TKO (punches)	Bellator 38	March 26, 2011	3	3:34	Tunica, Mississippi, United States	Bellator Season Four Light Heavyweight Tournament Quarterfinal.
Win	10–2	Francisco France	KO (punches)	Empire Fighting Championships: A Night of Reckoning 3	April 23, 2010	2	3:27	Tunica, Mississippi, United States	
Win	9–2	Kendrick Watkins	TKO (punches)	Rumble at Raxx 7	January 30, 2010	1	1:05	Louisiana, United States	
Win	8–2	Brian Imes	TKO (punches)	5150 Combat League / Xtreme Fighting League: New Year's Revolution	January 16, 2010	1	2:22	Tulsa, Oklahoma, United States	
Loss	7–2	Vinny Magalhães	Submission (triangle choke)	CFP: Carolina Crown 2	October 24, 2009	1	1:13	Raleigh, North Carolina, United States	
Win	7–1	Chris Bell	Submission (armbar)	Rumble at Raxx 6	October 17, 2009	1	0:58	Louisiana, United States	
Win	6–1	Chris Bell	Submission (armbar)	Cajun Fighting Championships	June 26, 2009	1	2:03	Lafayette, Louisiana, United States	
Loss	5–1	Jeremy Horn	Submission (rear-naked choke)	Adrenaline MMA 3: Bragging Rights	June 13, 2009	1	4:17	Birmingham, Alabama, United States	
Win	5–0	Brett Chism	Submission (armbar)	DPP: Blood, Sweat & Victory	March 14, 2009	1	1:10	Columbus, Georgia, United States	
Win	4–0	Brad Rinehart	TKO (punches)	Rumble at Raxx 4	January 17, 2009	1	1:06	Louisiana, United States	
Win	3–0	Donavin Hawkey	Submission (armbar)	XFC 6: Clash of the Continents	December 5, 2008	1	3:58	Tampa, United States	
Win	2–0	Mike Perez	Submission (rear-naked choke)	Rumble at Raxx 3	October 17, 2008	1	1:18	Louisiana, United States	
Win	1–0	Patrick Mandio	TKO (doctor stoppage)	EFN: Gadsden Extreme Fight Night	June 29, 2008	2	5:00	Gadsden, Alabama, United States	
