= WSOF =

WSOF may refer to

- World Series of Fighting, a mixed martial arts promotion, based in the United States
- World Series of Fighting: Canada, a mixed martial arts promotion, based in Canada
- World Series of Fighting: Central America, a mixed martial arts promotion based in Central America
- WSOF (FM), a radio station (89.9 FM) licensed to serve Madisonville, Kentucky, United States
