= The Fight Club =

MMA promoter based in Edmonton, Alberta

- Type: Private
- Industry: Mixed martial arts promotion
- Founders: Glen Carriere, Mark Sinclair & Milan Lubovac
- Headquarters: Edmonton, Alberta
- Website: http://www.thefightclub.ca

The Fight Club was a Canadian mixed martial arts (MMA) promotion based in Edmonton, Alberta. TFC held its events at the Shaw Conference Centre.

== Rules ==
TFC employs the Unified Rules of Mixed Martial Arts. Fighters compete in a cage.

=== Rounds ===
Every round in TFC competition is five minutes in duration. Title matches have five such rounds, and non-title matches have three. There is a one-minute rest period between rounds.

=== Attire ===
All competitors must fight in approved shorts, without shoes. Shirts, gis or long pants (including gi pants) are not allowed. Fighters must use approved light-weight open-fingered gloves, that include at least 1" of padding around the knuckles, (110 to 170 g (3.9 to 6.0 oz) that allow fingers to grab. These gloves enable fighters to punch with less risk of an injured or broken hand, while retaining the ability to grab and grapple.

=== Match outcome ===
Matches usually end via:

- Submission: A fighter clearly taps on the mat or his opponent or verbally submits.
- Technical Submission: A technical submission is achieved when the referee stops a fight due to an injury resulting from a submission hold or due to a fighter going unconscious from a choke.
- Knockout: A fighter falls from a legal blow and is either unconscious or unable to immediately continue.
- Technical Knockout (TKO): If a fighter cannot continue, the fight is ended as a technical knockout. Technical knockouts can be classified into three categories:
  - Referee stoppage: The referee determines a fighter cannot "intelligently defend" himself; if warnings to the fighter to improve his position or defense go unanswered—generally, two warnings are given, about 5 seconds apart.
  - Doctor stoppage: A ringside doctor due to injury or impending injury, as when blood flows into the eyes and blinds a fighter.
  - Corner stoppage: A fighter's own corner-man signals defeat for their own fighter.
- Judges' Decision: Depending on scoring, a match may end as:
  - Unanimous decision: All three judges score a win for fighter A.
  - Majority decision: Two judges score a win for fighter A, one judge scores a draw.
  - Split decision: Two judges score a win for fighter A, one judge scores a win for fighter B.
  - Unanimous draw: All three judges score a draw.
  - Majority draw: Two judges score a draw, one judge scoring a win.
  - Split draw: One judge scores a win for fighter A, one judge scores a win for fighter B, and one judge scores a draw.

In the event of a draw, it is not necessary that the fighters' total points be equal. However, in a unanimous or split draw, each fighter does score an equal number of win judgments from the three judges (0 or 1, respectively).

A fight can also end in a technical decision, disqualification, forfeit, technical draw, or no contest. The latter two outcomes have no winners.

=== Judging criteria ===
The ten-point must system is in effect for all fights; three judges score each round and the winner of each receives ten points, the loser nine points or fewer. If the round is even, both fighters receive ten points.

=== Fouls ===
The Nevada State Athletic Commission currently lists the following as fouls:

1. Butting with the head
2. Eye gouging of any kind
3. Biting
4. Hair pulling
5. Groin attacks of any kind
6. Fish hooking, gouging as in self-defense and some martial arts.
7. Putting a finger into any orifice or into any cut or laceration on an opponent.
8. Small joint manipulation
9. Striking to the spine or the back of the head (see Rabbit punch)
10. Striking downward using the point of the elbow (see Elbow (strike))
11. Throat strikes of any kind, including, without limitation, grabbing the trachea
12. Clawing, pinching or twisting the flesh
13. Grabbing the clavicle
14. Kicking the head of a grounded opponent
15. Kneeing the head of a grounded opponent
16. Stomping a grounded opponent
17. Kicking to the kidney with the heel
18. Spiking an opponent to the canvas on his head or neck. (see piledriver)
19. Throwing an opponent out of the ring or fenced area
20. Holding the shorts or gloves of an opponent
21. Spitting at an opponent
22. Engaging in unsportsmanlike conduct that causes an injury to an opponent
23. Holding the ropes or the fence
24. Using abusive language in the ring or fenced area
25. Attacking an opponent on or during the break
26. Attacking an opponent who is under the care of the referee
27. Attacking an opponent after the bell (horn) has sounded the end of a round
28. Flagrantly disregarding the instructions of the referee
29. Timidity, including, without limitation, avoiding contact with an opponent, intentionally or consistently dropping the mouthpiece or faking an injury
30. Interference by the corner
31. Throwing in the towel during competition

When a foul is charged, the referee in their discretion may deduct one or more points as a penalty. If a foul incapacitates a fighter, then the match may end in a disqualification if the foul was intentional, or a no contest if unintentional. If a foul causes a fighter to be unable to continue later in the bout, it ends with a technical decision win to the injured fighter if the injured fighter is ahead on points, otherwise it is a technical draw.

=== Match conduct ===
- After a verbal warning the referee can stop the fighters and stand them up if they reach a stalemate on the ground (where neither are in a dominant position or working towards one).
- If the referee pauses the match, it is resumed with the fighters in their prior positions.
- Grabbing the ring ropes brings a verbal warning, followed by an attempt by the referee to release the grab by pulling on the grabbing hand. If that attempt fails or if the fighter continues to hold the ropes, the referee may charge a foul.

== Champions ==
Division	Upper weight limit	Champion	Since	Title Defenses
Heavyweight	265 lb (120 kg; 18.9 st)			
Light Heavyweight	205 lb (93 kg; 14.6 st)			
Middleweight	185 lb (84 kg; 13.2 st)			
Welterweight	170 lb (77 kg; 12 st)	(Canada) Ryan Ford	TFC 9 December 5, 2009	1
Lightweight	155 lb (70 kg; 11.1 st)			
Featherweight	145 lb (66 kg; 10.4 st)			
Bantamweight	135 lb (61 kg; 9.6 st)			

== TFC Events ==
TFC 1: First Blood at the Shaw Conference Centre on December 28, 2007

- Chuck Pelc def. Lee Berger by TKO 1:05 Round 1 (Unanswered blows)
- Chase Holthe def. Phil Wark by SUB 1:05 Round 1 (Triangle Choke)
- Middleweight Bout: Marcus Hicks def. Mason Hunter by TKO :28 Round 1 (Unanswered blows)
- Jay Jenkins def. Brad Geiger by KO 4:18 Round 1
- Shaun Krysa def. Richard Menard by SUB 1:30 Round 1 tap out (unanswered blows)
- Tim Thurston def. Curtis Demarce by KO :34 Round 3
- Chris Ade def. Adam Thomas by SUB 4:58 Round 2 (Arm bar)
- Canadian Welterweight MMA Title: Victor Bachmann def. Stjepan Vujnovic by TKO :49 Round 1 (Unanswered blows)
- Main Event: Heavyweight Bout: Nick Penner def. Eric Esch by SUB 2:28 Round 1 tap out (unanswered blows)

TFC 2: Penner vs. Kalmakoff at the Edmonton Event Centre on March 7, 2008.

- Phil Wark def. Tony Bibby by unanimous decision
- Curtis Demarce def. Tim Brown by submission (ARM BAR) 1:17 Rd 1
- Trevor Daley def. Kevin Logan by TKO (UNANSWERED BLOWS) 1:39 Rd 1
- Larry Lyttle def. Richard Menard by TKO (UNANSWERED BLOWS) 2:44 Rd 1
- James McCutcheon def. Cody Graber by submission (ARM BAR) 3:57 Rd 1
- Tim Smith def. Dan Walders by submission (REAR CHOKE) 1:53 Rd 2
- Jason Alexander def. Kevin Dolan by TKO (CUTS) 1:01 Rd 1
- Markhaile Wedderburn def. Neil Berry by submission (REAR CHOKE) 4:50 Rd 1
- Main Event: Heavyweight Bout: Nick Penner def. Bobby Kalmakoff by TKO (UNANSWERED BLOWS) 1:26 Rd 1

TFC 3: This Means War on May 31, 2008, in Edmonton, Alberta, Canada

- Lightweight Bout: Dave Henry def. Brent Haley by SUB 1:47 Round 1 (Rear Naked Choke)
- Light Heavyweight Bout: Bill Mesi def. Bill Mesi by KO .34 Round 2 (Body shot)
- Light Heavyweight Bout: Travis Whaling def. Allen Hope by TKO .54 Round 1 Tap (Unanswered Blows)
- Welterweight Bout: Kevin Dolan def. Jase Nibourg by TKO .38 Round 1 (Unanswered Blows)
- Welterweight Bout: James McCutcheon def. Nolan Clark by TKO 1:14 Round 2 (Unanswered Blows)
- Middleweight Bout: Claude Patrick def. Dan Chambers by SUB .51 Round 1 (North South Choke)
- Middleweight Bout: Solomon Hutcherson def. Marcus Hicks by TKO 1:29 Round 1 (Unanswered Blows)
- MUAY THAI Main Event: Welterweight Bout: Levi Kump def. Sokhim Or by 5 Rd Split Decision (Kickboxing)
- Main Event: Heavyweight Bout: Nick Penner def. Jared Kilkenny by SUB 4:13 Round 2 (Kimora)

TFC 4: Retribution on August 29, 2008, in Edmonton, Alberta, Canada

- Sean McKinnon def. Jordan Lannon, Round 3 (Decision)
- Hal Kreisel def. John Hamm Round 3 (Decision)
- Keijiro Noda vs Ben Arlow
- Welterweight Bout: Levi Kump def. John Laing Round 3 (Decision)
- Tim "Shady" Smith def. Kevin Dolan by SUB 4:41 Round 1, (Armbar)
- Brandon Carlick def. Dave Henry by KO, 1:47 Round 1
- Chris Ade def. Kyle Crowell by SUB 1:42 Round 1 (ArmBar)
- K-1 Main Event: Heavyweight Bout: Nick Penner def. Sandy Pembroke Round 3 (Decision)

TFC 5: Armageddon on December 5, 2008, at the Shaw Conference Centre in Edmonton, Alberta, Canada

- Mark Sawka vs. Pierre Dumont
- Jason Gorny vs. Todd Mabbott
- Brent Haley vs. Justin Carpenter
- Jackie Mikalsky vs. Megan Williams
- Bill Mesi vs. Ben Borger
- Chris Ade vs. Mike Bell
- James McCutcheon vs. Jordon McKay
- Nick Penner vs. Luc Desautels
- Levi Kump vs. Aaron Castellvi
- TFC Canadian Welterweight MMA Championship: Claude Patrick def. Victor Bachman to become the new Canadian Welterweight Champion

TFC 6: Domination on March 20, 2009, in Edmonton, Alberta, Canada

- David Bodrug def. Tyson Russell in Round 2, (Unanswered Blows)
- Mike Froese def. Darrell Okeynan in Round 1, (Guillotine From Mount)
- Gina Mazany def. Jackie Mikalsky in ROUND 1, (Unanswered Blows)
- Jason Gorny def. Sean Merkl in Round 1, (Unanswered Blows)
- Jorge Ravanal def. Mike Bell in Round 2, (Rear Naked Choke)
- Yukon Jack def. Paul Brown in Round 1, (Rear Naked Choke)
- TFC Canadian MMA Welterweight Championship: Claude Patrick def. Dave Mazany in Round 2, (Unanswered Blows) to retain his title.
- Main Event: Nick Penner def. Joe Fonoti in Round 2, (Decision)

TFC 7: Full Throttle on May 30, 2009, in Edmonton, Alberta, Canada

- Jorge Ravanal def. Leo Ahmed in Round 1, KO (punches)
- Ben Arlow def. Jake Bluhm in Round 1, KO (punches)
- Mitch Clarke def. Adam Hunsperger in Round 1, Submission (guillotine choke)
- Jason Gorny def. Ryan Lacasse in Round 1, Submission (rear naked choke)
- Chase Degenhart def. Chuck Pelc in Round 1, TKO (punches)
- Lenny Wheeler def. Chris Ade in Round 1, TKO (punches)
- Luke Harris def. Mike Rowbotham in Round 1, Submission (armbar)
- Victor Valimaki def. Isaiah Larson in Round 2, TKO (punches)
- Main Event: Ryan Ford def. Dave Manzany in Round 1, TKO (punches)

TFC 8: Salvation on September 18, 2009, in Edmonton, Alberta, Canada

- Darcy Boizard def. Jason Bowden in Round 2, TKO (punches)
- Tyson Russell def. Brent Haley in Round 2, Submission (rear naked choke)
- Tarek Gabali def. Rob Ryan in Round 1, TKO (punches)
- Curtis Demarce def. Chris Ade via Decision (unanimous)
- Ryan McGillivary def. Adam Thomas in Round 1, Submission (rear naked choke)
- Victor Valimaki def. Lewis Polley via Decision (unanimous) - Won the TFC Light Heavyweight Championship
- Main Event: Ryan Ford def. Markhaile Wedderburn in Round 1, Submission (rear naked choke) - Won the TFC Interim Welterweight Championship

TFC 9: Total Chaos on December 5, 2009, in Edmonton, Alberta, Canada

- Devon Neis def. Greg McDougall in Round 1, TKO (punches)
- Rio Wells def. Darcy Boizard in Round 1, TKO (punches)
- Mike Froese def. Tim Skidmore in Round 1, Submission (rear naked choke)
- Cody Krahn def. Jason Gorny in Round 1, TKO (punches)
- Curtis Demarce def. Jorge Ravanal in Round 1, Submission (armbar)
- Victor Bachman def. Mike Rowbotham in Round 2, TKO (retirement)
- Kyle Coutu def. Johnathan Pridham in Round 2, TKO (punches)
- Richie Hightower def. Jordan McKay in Round 1, TKO (punches)
- Main Event: Ryan Ford def. John Walsh in Round 1, KO (punches) - Won the Vacant TFC Welterweight Championship

TFC 10: High Voltage on March 19, 2010, in Edmonton, Alberta, Canada

- David Bodrug def. Doug Newman in Round 2, Submission (rear naked choke)
- Rio Wells def. Tim Skidmore in Round 1, TKO (punches)
- Curtis Demarce def. Mike Bell via Decision (unanimous)
- Mitch Clarke def. Brandon MacAurther in Round 2, Submission (rear naked choke)
- Sheldon Westcott def. Tim Smith in Round 1, TKO (punches)
- Victor Bachman def. Markhaile Wedderburn in Round 1, Submission (rear naked choke)
- Martin Desilets def. Victor Valimaki in Round 1, TKO (punches) - Won the TFC Light Heavyweight Championship
- Main Event: Ryan Ford def. Tommy Speer in Round 1, Submission (rear naked choke) - Defended the TFC Welterweight Championship
