= Ryan Ford (fighter) =

Canadian mixed martial arts fighter (born 1982)

- Born: March 8, 1982 (age 44); Edmonton, Alberta, Canada
- Other names: The Real Deal
- Height: 5 ft 11 in (1.80 m)
- Weight: 175 lb (79 kg; 12.5 st)
- Division: Welterweight (MMA); Super Middleweight (Boxing); Light Heavyweight (Boxing); Cruiserweight (Boxing)
- Reach: 76 in (193 cm)
- Style: Orthodox
- Team: WolfHouse MMA
- Years active: 2007–2014; 2022–present (MMA); 2010, 2015–present (Boxing)

Professional boxing record
- Total: 25
- Wins: 17
- By knockout: 12
- Losses: 8
- By knockout: 1

Mixed martial arts record
- Total: 30
- Wins: 24
- By knockout: 13
- By submission: 9
- By decision: 2
- Losses: 6
- By submission: 5
- By decision: 1

Other information
- Boxing record from BoxRec
- Mixed martial arts record from Sherdog

Ryan Ford (born March 8, 1982) is a Canadian professional boxer and mixed martial artist. A professional competitor since 2007, Ford has also formerly competed for Bellator, the WSOF, the MFC, TFC, and the AFC.

== Mixed martial arts career ==
=== Maximum Fighting Championship ===
Ford began his career with Maximum Fighting Championship, On February 22, 2008, at MFC 15 Ford defeated Pete Spratt via rear-naked choke in the second round.

On May 9, 2008, at MFC 16 Ford defeated CJ Fernandes via rear-naked choke submission in round one.

On July 25, 2008, at MFC 17 Ford was defeated by Pat Healy via arm-bar submission, the fight was for the MFC Welterweight Championship.

On September 28, 2008, at MFC 18 Ford defeated Laverne Clark via guillotine choke in the second round.

On February 20, 2009, at MFC 20 Ford was defeated by Pat Healy via split decision in a rematch for the MFC Welterweight Championship.

On September 10, 2010, at MFC 26 Ford was defeated by Douglas Lima via armbar submission in the second round.

On November 12, 2010, at MFC 27 Ford defeated Pete Spratt in a rematch via rear-naked choke submission.

Ford has twice left the Edmonton-based MFC organization due to contract disputes.

=== Independent promotions ===
Ford signed with the Edmonton-based promotion The Fight Club. On March 19, 2010, at TFC 10 Ford defeated former Ultimate Fighter finalist Tom Speer via rear-naked choke submission in round one on March 19, 2010, to retain the TFC Welterweight Championship.

On May 19, 2011, Ford fought UFC veteran Karo Parisyan at MMA Live 1 in London, Ontario, After the first two rounds, Ford caught Parisyan with a knee and cut his forehead, causing the doctor and referee to stop the fight giving Ford the win via doctor stoppage.

=== Aggression Fighting Championship ===
On June 10, 2011, Ford Returned to the Aggression MMA organization at AMMA 7: Confrontation defeating Nick Hinchcliffe in round three via TKO due to punches. On September 16, 2011, at AMMA 8: Unfinished Business, Ford was defeated by David Hulett via guillotine choke in round one. On February 11, 2012, Ford defeated Ricky Goodall at AMMA 9 via TKO due to elbows in round one.

On March 23, 2013, Ford fought for the renamed Aggression Fighting Championship promotion in Edmonton, Alberta. Ford defeated Brendan Tierney via KO in the second round at AFC 17.

Ford faced Ultimate Fighter vet Michael Hill on July 5, 2013, at AFC 19 for the AFC Welterweight Championship. Ford defeated Hill via rear-naked choke submission in the fifth round to win the AFC Welterweight Championship.

=== Bellator Fighting Championships ===
Ford signed with Bellator making his debut On May 4, 2012, at Bellator 67, Ford defeated Luis Santos via TKO due to knees and punches in the second round.

On November 2, 2012, at Bellator 79, Ford took on Kyle Baker at Casino Rama in Ontario, Ford won via unanimous decision.

=== World Series of Fighting ===
On December 5, 2013, it was announced that Ford signed a multi-fight deal with World Series of Fighting’s Canadian branch and is expected to debut under the WSOF banner in early 2014.

Ford is expected to make is WSOF debut at WSOF Canada 1 against Joel Powell for the inaugural WSOF Canadian Welterweight Championship. Ford won via knockout due to a front kick and punches in just 53 seconds of round one to win the WSOF Canadian Welterweight Championship.

Ford was scheduled to fight Bristol Marunde on June 7, 2014, at WSOF Canada 2. He pulled out after getting injured during training.

Ford faced Jake Shields in the main event at WSOF 14 on October 11, 2014, in Edmonton, Alberta Canada. Although he dropped Shields early in the fight with a left hand, Ford eventually lost the fight via rear naked choke submission in the first round.

Ford was set to face Yushin Okami in a Middleweight bout for the main event of WSOF 21 on June 5, 2015. However, Ford announced that he had to pull out of the June fight with Okami.

=== Unified MMA ===
On January 6, 2022, it was announced that Ford would be making his return to MMA on March 4, 2022, at Unified MMA 43 against Dawond Pickney. He won the bout via triangle choke in the second round.

Ford made his return on May 27, 2022, at Unified MMA 45 facing off against Robert Hale for the Unified MMA Super Welterweight Championship. He won the fight via first-round technical knockout.

Ford faced Fay Bursell on March 31, 2023, at Unified MMA 50, losing the bout via rear-naked choke in the third round.

== Professional boxing career ==
Ford made his professional boxing debut on February 13, 2010, winning a four-round majority decision over Willard Lewis. On June 8, 2015, it was announced that Ford was retiring from MMA to focus on a career in professional boxing.

Ford fought on September 11, 2015, against Gary Kopas competing for the KO Boxing promotion. He won a four-round unanimous decision.

On September 20, 2015, it was announced that Ford will fight on October 16, 2015, against Antonio Dos Santos at Dekada Premier Fight Night. He won via knockout in the first round.

On November 13, 2015, it was announced that Ford will fight on December 4, 2015, against Alvaro Enriquez for the KO Boxing promotion. He won via technical knockout in the second round.

On February 22, 2016, it was announced that Ford will fight on March 11, 2016, against David Whittom for the KO Boxing promotion. He won via knockout in the first round.

On April 22, 2016, Ford faced former Thailand Olympic Gold and silver medalist Manus Boonjumnong. He won via fourth-round technical knockout after his opponent was no longer able to continue entering the fifth round.

On September 9, 2016, Ford faced former World Boxing Council Cruiserweight Champion Victor Manuel Palacios for the KO Boxing promotion. He won the fight via unanimous decision.

On October 29, 2016, it was announced that Ford would face IBO Asia Pacific Light Heavyweight Champion Sam Rapira on February 17, 2017, for the Vacant UBO Light Heavyweight Championship. He won the fight via TKO to become the UBO World Light Heavyweight Champion.

On November 10, 2016, it was announced that Ford would be facing Mario Baeza for the KO Boxing promotion on December 2, 2016. He won the fight via unanimous decision.

On March 13, 2017, it was announced that Ford would be making the first defense of his title against former WBC Asian World Champion New Zealand fighter Robert Berridge on May 27, 2017. He won the fight via technical decision after an accidental head butt.

On August 10, 2017, it as announced that Ford would be facing British fighter WBO European Light Heavyweight Champion Anthony Yarde on September 16, 2017, for the vacant WBO Intercontinental Light Heavyweight Championship. On August 25, 2017, it was announced that the fight was canceled after a contract dispute.

On September 6, 2017, it was announced that Ford would be facing Joaquin Murrieta on September 9, 2017, for Rixta Promotions. He won the fight via corner stoppage in the fourth round.

On November 17, 2017, it was announced that Ford would be facing former WBA Super Middleweight Champion Fedor Chudinov for the WBA International Super Middleweight Title on December 9, 2017. Ford lost via twelve round unanimous decision.

On February 9, 2019, Ford faced off against Nick Hannig for the vacant WBC International light heavyweight title. Ford lost via twelve round unanimous decision.

On April 6, 2019, Ford faced off against German Olympic boxer Serge Michel. Ford won the fight via knockout to win the WBC International Silver light heavyweight title.

On August 31, 2019, Ford faced undefeated Joshua Buatsi which ended in controversy after what appeared to be a low shot from Buatsi, the fight was stopped awarding Buatsi the victory via knockout

== Mixed martial arts record ==
Professional record breakdown
30 matches	24 wins	6 losses
By knockout	13	0
By submission	9	5
By decision	2	1

Res.	Record	Opponent	Method	Event	Date	Round	Time	Location	Notes
Loss	24–6	Fay Bursell	Submission (rear-naked choke)	Unified MMA 50	March 31, 2023	3	3:58	Enoch, Alberta, Canada	Lost the Unified Super Welterweight Championship
Win	24–5	Robert Hale	TKO (punches)	Unified MMA 45	May 27, 2022	1	3:56	Enoch, Alberta, Canada	Won the Unified Super Welterweight Championship
Win	23–5	Dawond Pickney	Submission (triangle choke)	Unified MMA 43	March 4, 2022	2	4:01	Enoch, Alberta, Canada	Catchweight (175 lb) bout.
Loss	22–5	Jake Shields	Submission (rear-naked choke)	WSOF 14	October 11, 2014	1	4:29	Edmonton, Alberta, Canada	
Win	22–4	Joel Powell	KO (front kick and punches)	WSOF Canada 1	February 21, 2014	1	0:53	Edmonton, Alberta, Canada	Won the WSOF Canadian Welterweight Championship.
Win	21–4	Michael Hill	Submission (rear-naked choke)	AFC 19	July 5, 2013	5	4:32	Edmonton, Alberta, Canada	Won the AFC Welterweight Championship
Win	20–4	Brendan Tierney	KO (punch)	AFC 17	March 23, 2013	2	3:11	Edmonton, Alberta Canada	
Win	19–4	Kyle Baker	Decision (unanimous)	Bellator 79	November 2, 2012	3	5:00	Rama, Ontario Canada	
Win	18–4	Luis Santos	TKO (knee and punches)	Bellator 67	May 4, 2012	2	1:24	Rama, Ontario Canada	
Win	17–4	Ricky Goodall	TKO (elbows)	AMMA 9: Aggression MMA 9	February 11, 2012	1	3:37	Edmonton, Alberta Canada	
Loss	16–4	David Hulett	Submission (guillotine choke)	AMMA 8: Unfinished Business	September 16, 2011	1	1:35	Edmonton, Alberta Canada	For AMMA Welterweight Championship
Win	16–3	Nick Hinchliffe	TKO (punches)	AMMA 7: Confrontation	June 10, 2011	3	0:18	Edmonton, Alberta Canada	
Win	15–3	Karo Parisyan	TKO (doctor stoppage)	JEG: MMA Live 1	May 19, 2011	3	1:26	London, Ontario Canada	
Win	14–3	Johnny Davis	TKO (punches)	AMMA 6: Edmonton	March 11, 2011	2	2:06	Edmonton, Alberta Canada	
Win	13–3	Pete Spratt	Submission (rear-naked choke)	MFC 27	November 12, 2010	2	3:07	Edmonton, Alberta Canada	
Loss	12–3	Douglas Lima	Submission (armbar)	MFC 26	September 10, 2010	2	0:48	Edmonton, Alberta Canada	
Win	12–2	Tom Speer	Submission (rear-naked choke)	TFC 10: High Voltage	March 19, 2010	1	4:29	Edmonton, Alberta Canada	Defended TFC Welterweight Championship
Win	11–2	John Walsh	KO (punches)	TFC 9: Total Chaos	December 5, 2009	1	0:13	Edmonton, Alberta Canada	Won vacant TFC Welterweight Championship
Win	10–2	Markhaile Wedderburn	Submission (rear-naked choke)	TFC 8: Salvation	September 18, 2009	1	1:24	Edmonton, Alberta Canada	Won Interim TFC Welterweight Championship
Win	9–2	Dave Mazany	TKO (punches)	TFC 7: Full Throttle	May 30, 2009	1	0:28	Edmonton, Alberta Canada	
Loss	8–2	Pat Healy	Decision (split)	MFC 20	February 20, 2009	5	5:00	Edmonton, Alberta Canada	For MFC Welterweight Championship
Win	8–1	Nabil Khatib	Decision (unanimous)	Raw Combat: Redemption	October 25, 2008	3	5:00	Calgary, Alberta Canada	
Win	7–1	Laverne Clark	Submission (guillotine choke)	MFC 18: Famous	September 28, 2008	2	2:30	Edmonton, Alberta Canada	
Loss	6–1	Pat Healy	Submission (armbar)	MFC 17: Hostile Takeover	July 25, 2008	3	3:00	Edmonton, Alberta Canada	For MFC Welterweight Championship
Win	6–0	CJ Fernandes	Submission (rear-naked choke)	MFC 16: Anger Management	May 9, 2008	1	2:32	Edmonton, Alberta Canada	
Win	5–0	Pete Spratt	Submission (rear-naked choke)	MFC 15: Rags to Riches	February 22, 2008	2	4:01	Edmonton, Alberta Canada	
Win	4–0	Mike Sorenson	TKO (punches)	MFC 14: High Rollers	November 23, 2007	2	0:51	Edmonton, Alberta Canada	
Win	3–0	Adil Abbas	Submission (rear-naked choke)	ECC 6: Hometown Heroes	October 20, 2007	1	1:21	Halifax, Nova Scotia Canada	
Win	2–0	Randy Valette	TKO (punches and elbows)	MFC 13: Lucky 13	August 24, 2007	1	2:07	Edmonton, Alberta Canada	
Win	1–0	Aaron Gallant	TKO (punches)	MFC 12: High Stakes	June 22, 2007	2	4:15	Edmonton, Alberta Canada	

== Professional boxing record ==
26 fights	17 wins	9 losses
By knockout	12	1
By decision	5	8

No.	Result	Record	Opponent	Type	Round, time	Date	Location	Notes
26	Loss	17–9	Curtis Millender	UD	8	May 26, 2023	The Venue at River Cree, Enoch, Canada	
25	Loss	17–8	Shefat Isufi	UD	12	Sep 16, 2022	Rudolf Weber-Arena, Oberhausen, Germany	For WBF light-heavyweight title
24	Loss	17–7	Lukasz Stanioch	UD	10	Oct 29, 2021	MCKiS Hall, Jaworzno, Poland	
23	Loss	17–6	Aslambek Idigov	MD	10	Feb 21, 2020	Dynamo Palace of Sports, Moscow, Russia	
22	Win	17–5	Orlando Vazquez	TKO	6 (6), 2:59	Dec 6, 2019	Shaw Conference Centre, Edmonton, Canada	
21	Loss	16–5	Joshua Buatsi	KO	7 (10), 1:07	31 Aug 2019	The O2 Arena, London, England	For WBA International light-heavyweight title
20	Win	16–4	Serge Michel	KO	8 (12), 0:37	Apr 6, 2019	Ballhaus Forum, Unterschleißheim, Germany	Won vacant WBC International Silver light-heavyweight title
19	Loss	15–4	Nick Hannig	UD	12	Feb 9, 2019	Verti Music Hall, Berlin, Germany	For vacant WBC International light-heavyweight title
18	Win	15–3	Jovica Kokot	KO	2 (6), 1:05	Dec 15, 2018	Stockschützenhalle, Kühbach, Germany	
17	Loss	14–3	Avni Yildirim	UD	12	May 12, 2018	Nobeo Studios, Cologne, Germany	For WBC International super-middleweight title
16	Loss	14–2	Andrey Sirotkin	UD	12	Mar 24, 2018	Basket Hall, Krasnodar, Russia	For vacant WBA Inter-Continental super-middleweight title
15	Loss	14–1	Fedor Chudinov	UD	12	Dec 9, 2017	Arena, Kemerovo, Russia	For vacant WBA International super-middleweight title
14	Win	14–0	Miguel Cubos	TKO	3 (6), 2:36	Oct 21, 2017	Deerfoot Inn & Casino, Calgary, Canada	
13	Win	13–0	Joaquin Murrieta	RTD	4 (6), 3:00	Sep 9, 2017	Tohu Theatre, Montreal, Canada	
12	Win	12–0	Robert Berridge	TD	7 (12), 3:00	May 27, 2017	Resorts World Sentosa, Singapore	Retained UBO light-heavyweight title
11	Win	11–0	Rob Nichols	RTD	5 (6), 3:00	Mar 10, 2017	Shaw Conference Centre, Edmonton, Canada	
10	Win	10–0	Sam Rapira	TKO	9 (12), 2:09	Feb 17, 2017	Foochow Building, Singapore	Won vacant UBO light-heavyweight title
9	Win	9–0	Mario Baeza	UD	6	Dec 2, 2016	Shaw Conference Centre, Edmonton, Canada	
8	Win	8–0	Victor Manuel Palacios	UD	6	Sep 9, 2016	Shaw Conference Centre, Edmonton, Canada	
7	Win	7–0	Muhammad Meeraj	TKO	1 (6), 1:35	Jul 23, 2016	Far East Plaza, Singapore	
6	Win	6–0	Manus Boonjumnong	TKO	5 (8)	Apr 22, 2016	7th Infantry Division, Mae Rim district, Thailand	
5	Win	5–0	David Whittom	TKO	1 (4), 1:18	Mar 11, 2016	Shaw Conference Centre, Edmonton, Canada	
4	Win	4–0	Alvaro Enriquez	TKO	2 (4), 1:22	Dec 4, 2015	Shaw Conference Centre, Edmonton, Canada	
3	Win	3–0	Antonio Dos Santos	TKO	1 (5), 2:29	Oct 16, 2015	Genesis Centre, Calgary, Canada	
2	Win	2–0	Gary Kopas	UD	4	Sep 11, 2015	Shaw Conference Centre, Edmonton, Canada	
1	Win	1–0	Willard Lewis	MD	4	Feb 13, 2010	Shaw Conference Centre, Edmonton, Canada	

== Personal life ==
Ford is married to wife Nina & has two children, a son, Ryan Jr. and a daughter, Bella. He is the son of retired professional boxer Al Ford.

In 2003, Ford was the participant in an armed robbery home invasion. During the robbery, Ford used a knife on the home owner and cut the victim's left index and middle finger to the bone. The victim's wife and two children were present in the house at the time. Ford served a four-year sentence for this crime.

== Championships and accomplishments ==
=== Boxing ===
- Universal Boxing Organization
  - UBO World Light Heavyweight Championship (One time)
- World Boxing Council
  - WBC International Silver Light Heavyweight Championship (One time)

=== Mixed martial arts ===
- Aggression Fighting Championship
  - AFC Welterweight Championship (One time)
- The Fight Club
  - TFC Welterweight Championship (One time)
  - Interim TFC Welterweight Championship (One time)
- Unified MMA
  - Unified Super Welterweight Championship (One time, current)
- World Series of Fighting: Canada
  - WSOF Canadian Welterweight Championship (One time)

== See also ==
- List of male boxers
- List of male mixed martial artists

Sporting positions
Regional boxing titles
Vacant Title last held by Adam Deines	WBC International Silver light-heavyweight champion April 6, 2019 – 2020; Vacated	Vacant Title next held by Rostam Ibrahim
Minor world boxing titles
Vacant Title last held by Matamba Debatch Postolo	UBO light-heavyweight champion February 17, 2017 – 2018; Vacated	Vacant Title next held by Cedric Bellais
