= World Series of Fighting: Canada =

Canadian MA promoter based in Edmonton, Canada

World Series of Fighting (Canada)
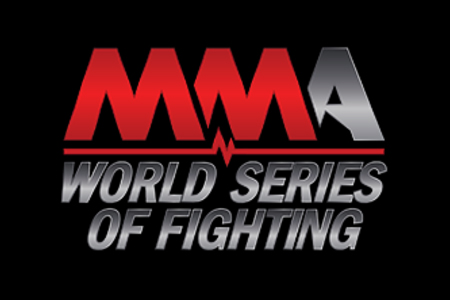
- Type: Private
- Industry: Mixed martial arts promotion
- Founded: 2013
- Headquarters: Edmonton, Alberta, Canada
- Key people: Darren Owen (COO); Ray Sefo (President)
- Website: http://wsofcanada.com/

World Series of Fighting (Canada) formerly Aggression Fighting Championship, Aggression MMA and Armageddon Fighting Championship is a Canadian Mixed Martial Arts promotion based out of Edmonton, Alberta, Canada. The promotions made their debuts in 2009. Armageddon Fighting Championship and Aggression MMA merged in 2012 to create Aggression Fighting Championship. In September 2013, World Series of Fighting purchased the Aggression Fighting Championship organization to enter the Canadian market, but it was later found out the AFC executives closed down the company to join a new organization WSOF Canada.

== Rules ==
AFC employs the Unified Rules of Mixed Martial Arts as Fighters compete in a cage.

=== Rounds ===
Every round in AFC competition is contested with a five-minute time limit. Championship bouts are contested with five, five-minute rounds, and non-title bouts are contested with three, five-minute rounds. There is a one-minute rest period in between rounds.

=== Attire ===
All competitors must fight in approved shorts, without shoes. Shirts, gis or long pants (including gi pants) are not allowed. Fighters must use approved light-weight open-fingered gloves, that include at least 1" of padding around the knuckles, (110 to 170 g / 4 to 6 ounces) that allow fingers to grab. These gloves enable fighters to punch with less risk of an injured or broken hand, while retaining the ability to grab and grapple.

=== Match outcome ===
Matches usually end via:

- Submission: a fighter clearly taps on the mat or his opponent or verbally submits.
- Technical Submission: A technical submission is achieved when the referee stops a fight due to an injury resulting from a submission hold or due to a fighter going unconscious from a choke.
- Knockout: a fighter falls from a legal blow and is either unconscious or unable to immediately continue.
- Technical Knockout (TKO): If a fighter cannot continue, the fight is ended as a technical knockout. Technical knockouts can be classified into three categories:
  - referee stoppage: (the referee determines a fighter cannot "intelligently defend" himself; if warnings to the fighter to improve his position or defense go unanswered—generally, two warnings are given, about 5 seconds apart)
  - doctor stoppage (a ringside doctor due to injury or impending injury, as when blood flows into the eyes and blinds a fighter)
  - corner stoppage (a fighter's own corner-man signals defeat for their own fighter)
- Judges' Decision: Depending on scoring, a match may end as:
  - unanimous decision (all three judges score a win for fighter A)
  - majority decision (two judges score a win for fighter A, one judge scores a draw)
  - split decision (two judges score a win for fighter A, one judge scores a win for fighter B)
  - unanimous draw (all three judges score a draw)
  - majority draw (two judges score a draw, one judge scoring a win)
  - split draw (one judge scores a win for fighter A, one judge scores a win for fighter B, and one judge scores a draw)

Note: In the event of a draw, it is not necessary that the fighters' total points be equal. However, in a unanimous or split draw, each fighter does score an equal number of win judgments from the three judges (0 or 1, respectively).

A fight can also end in a technical decision, disqualification, forfeit, technical draw, or no contest. The latter two outcomes have no winners.

=== Judging criteria ===
The ten-point must system is in effect for all fights; three judges score each round and the winner of each receives ten points, the loser nine points or fewer. If the round is even, both fighters receive ten points.

=== Fouls ===
The Athletic Commission currently lists the following as fouls:

1. Butting with the head
2. Eye gouging of any kind
3. Biting
4. Hair pulling
5. Fish hooking, as in self-defense and some forms of martial arts.
6. Groin attacks of any kind
7. Putting a finger into any orifice or into any cut or laceration on an opponent.
8. Small joint manipulation
9. Striking to the spine or the back of the head (see Rabbit punch)
10. Striking downward using the point of the elbow (see Elbow (strike))
11. Throat strikes of any kind, including, without limitation, grabbing the trachea
12. Clawing, pinching or twisting the flesh
13. Grabbing the clavicle
14. Kicking the head of a grounded opponent
15. Kneeing the head of a grounded opponent
16. Stomping a grounded opponent
17. Kicking to the kidney with the heel
18. Spiking an opponent to the canvas on his head or neck. (see piledriver)
19. Throwing an opponent out of the ring or fenced area
20. Holding the shorts or gloves of an opponent
21. Spitting at an opponent
22. Engaging in unsportsmanlike conduct that causes an injury to an opponent
23. Holding the ropes or the fence
24. Using abusive language in the ring or fenced area
25. Attacking an opponent on or during the break
26. Attacking an opponent who is under the care of the referee
27. Attacking an opponent after the bell (horn) has sounded the end of a round
28. Flagrantly disregarding the instructions of the referee
29. Timidity, including, without limitation, avoiding contact with an opponent, intentionally or consistently dropping the mouthpiece or faking an injury
30. Interference by the corner
31. Throwing in the towel during competition

When a foul is charged, the referee in their discretion may deduct one or more points as a penalty. If a foul incapacitates a fighter, then the match may end in a disqualification if the foul was intentional, or a no contest if unintentional. If a foul causes a fighter to be unable to continue later in the bout, it ends with a technical decision win to the injured fighter if the injured fighter is ahead on points, otherwise it is a technical draw.

=== Match conduct ===
- After a verbal warning the referee can stop the fighters and stand them up if they reach a stalemate on the ground (where neither are in a dominant position or working towards one).
- If the referee pauses the match, it is resumed with the fighters in their prior positions.
- Grabbing the ring ropes brings a verbal warning, followed by an attempt by the referee to release the grab by pulling on the grabbing hand. If that attempt fails or if the fighter continues to hold the ropes, the referee may charge a foul.

== Current Champions ==
Division	Weight	Champion	Since	Defenses
Light Heavyweight	Until 93 kg	Vacant		
Middleweight	Until 84 kg	Vacant		
Welterweight	Until 77 kg	(Canada) Ryan Ford	February 21, 2014 (WSOF Canada 1)	0
Lightweight	Until 70 kg	Vacant		
Bantamweight	Until 61 kg	Vacant		

== Title history ==
=== Light Heavyweight Championship ===
190 to 205 lbs (84 to 93 kg)

No.	Name	Event	Date	Defenses
1	(United States) Razak Al-Hassan def. Tim Chemelli	AFC 17: Anarchy; Edmonton, Alberta, Canada	March 23, 2013	
All AFC titles were vacated after they were purchased by WSOF.

=== Middleweight Championship ===
171 to 185 lbs (77 to 84 kg)

No.	Name	Event	Date	Defenses
1	(United States) John Salter def. Kalib Starnes	AFC 6: Conviction; Victoria, British Columbia, Canada	June 18, 2011	
All AFC titles were vacated after they were purchased by WSOF.

=== Welterweight Championship ===
156 to 170 lbs (77 to 84 kg)

No.	Name	Event	Date	Defenses
1	(Canada) Ryan Ford def. Michael Hill	AFC 19: Undisputed; Edmonton, Alberta, Canada	July 5, 2013	
All AFC titles were vacated after they were purchased by WSOF.
2	(Canada) Ryan Ford def. Joel Powell	WSOF Canada 1 Edmonton, Alberta, Canada	February 21, 2014	

=== Lightweight Championship ===
146 to 155 lbs (77 to 84 kg)

No.	Name	Event	Date	Defenses
1	(Canada) Stephen Beaumont def. Evan Sanguin	AFC 9: Inception; Edmonton, Alberta, Canada	June 8, 2012	
2	(Canada) Shane Campbell	AFC 14: Invasion; Edmonton, Alberta, Canada	November 23, 2012	
3	(Canada) Jesse Ronson	AFC 19: Undisputed; Edmonton, Alberta, Canada	July 5, 2013	
Ronson vactated the title when he left AFC for the UFC.

=== Bantamweight Championship ===
126 to 135 lbs (77 to 84 kg)

No.	Name	Event	Date	Defenses
1	(Canada) Curtis Brigham def. Mike Adams	AFC 16: Uprising; Winnipeg, Manitoba, Canada	March 23, 2013	
All AFC titles were vacated after they were purchased by WSOF.

== See also ==
- World Series of Fighting
- World Series of Fighting: Central America
