= List of AFC events =

This is a list of events held and scheduled by the Aggression Fighting Championship (AFC), a mixed martial arts organization based in Canada.

== Events ==
=== Aggression MMA ===
==== AMMA 1 ====
AMMA 1: First Blood
- Promotion: Aggression MMA
- Date: October 24, 2009
- Venue: Edmonton Expo Centre
- City: Edmonton, Alberta, Canada

Event chronology
AMMA 1: First Blood	AMMA 2: Vengeance

AMMA 1: First Blood was held on October 24, 2009, at the Edmonton Expo Centre in Edmonton, Alberta.

Results

Main Card
Weight class				Method	Round	Time	Notes
Light Heavyweight	Matt Horwich	def.	Jason Lambert	Decision (split)	3	5:00
Bantamweight	Nick Denis	def.	Jason Townes	TKO (knee and kick to the body)	2	1:26
Middleweight	Nick Ring	def.	Yannick Galipeau	Submission (armbar)	1	2:30
Light Heavyweight	Cyrille Diabaté	def.	Marcus Hicks	Submission (armbar)	1	1:29
Welterweight	Len Bentley	def.	Kurt Southern	Submission (armbar)	1	0:20
Bantamweight	Corey Lautischer	def.	Robin Black	Submission (guillotine choke)	1	0:31
Featherweight	Adam Lorenz	def.	Rolando Perez	Decision (unanimous)	3	5:00
Featherweight	Lenny Wheeler	def.	Amir Uddin	TKO (punches)	1	0:30
Bantamweight	Tony Bibby	def.	Corey Knapp	Submission (guillotine choke)	1	0:54
Lightweight	Jason Tardif	def.	James Petryk	TKO (punches)	2	4:23
Lightweight	Sean Carr	def.	Ivan Lepki	Submission (punches)	1	0:45

==== AMMA 2 ====
AMMA 2: Vengeance
- Promotion: Aggression MMA
- Date: February 5, 2010
- Venue: Edmonton Expo Centre
- City: Edmonton, Alberta, Canada

Event chronology
AMMA 1: First Blood	AMMA 2: Vengeance	AMMA 3: Trilogy

AMMA 2: Vengeance was held on February 5, 2010, at the Edmonton Expo Centre in Edmonton, Alberta.

Results

Main Card
Weight class				Method	Round	Time	Notes
Middleweight	Jesse Taylor	def.	Jason Day	Submission (rear naked choke)	1	1:14
Welterweight	Claude Patrick	def.	Matt MacGrath	Submission (guillotine choke)	3	2:29
Bantamweight	Hardeep Singh	def.	Ryan Brigham	TKO (punches)	1	N/A
Bantamweight	Robin Black	def.	Matt Knysh	TKO (punches)	2	1:20
Middleweight	Chase Degenhardt	def.	Dan Chambers	TKO (punches)	2	0:55
Heavyweight	Ilya Woronowski	def.	Lee Mein	TKO (punches)	1	4:24
Featherweight	Adam Lorenz	def.	Tim Tamaki	Submission (arm triangle choke)	1	4:01
Middleweight	Matt McDonald	def.	Marcus Hicks	TKO (punches)	1	3:30
Middleweight	Igor Caetano	def.	Ben Snyder	Submission (arm triangle choke)	1	2:18

==== AMMA 3 ====
AMMA 3: Trilogy
- Promotion: Aggression MMA
- Date: May 21, 2010
- Venue: Wesbild Centre
- City: Vernon, British Columbia, Canada

Event chronology
AMMA 1: First Blood	AMMA 3: Trilogy	AMMA 4: Victory

AMMA 3: Trilogy was held on May 21, 2010, at the Wesbild Centre in Vernon, British Columbia.

Results

Main Card
Weight class				Method	Round	Time	Notes
Welterweight	Nick Hinchliffe	def.	Craig Brown	Submission (rear naked choke)	3	2:45
Featherweight	Baz Cunningham	def.	Brendan Frost	TKO (retirement)	2	5:00
Lightweight	Mike Adams	def.	Graham Spencer	Submission (guillotine choke)	2	2:59
Middleweight	David Perron	def.	Nolan Clark	Submission (punches)	1	4:25
Middleweight	Clay Davidson	def.	Devon Neis	Submission (kimura)	1	2:24
Lightweight	Dia Grant	def.	Darcy James	Submission (rear naked choke)	1	1:20
Flyweight	Rachael Swatez	def.	Lori Ann Hilland	TKO (punches)	1	4:50
Featherweight	Russell Davies	def.	Upneet Rai	TKO (punches)	1	2:19
Welterweight	Chris Jones	def.	Rob Bastone	Submission (rear naked choke)	2	1:24
Bantamweight	Phil Wark	def.	Chris Lesley	Decision (unanimous)	3	5:00

==== AMMA 4 ====
AMMA 4: Victory
- Promotion: Aggression MMA
- Date: July 9, 2010
- Venue: Edmonton Expo Centre
- City: Edmonton, Alberta, Canada

Event chronology
AMMA 3: Trilogy	AMMA 4: Victory	AMMA 5: Uprising

AMMA 4: Victory was held on July 9, 2010, at the Edmonton Expo Centre in Edmonton, Alberta.

Results

Main Card
Weight class				Method	Round	Time	Notes
Heavyweight	Tim Hague	def.	Zak Jensen	TKO (knees)	1	2:11
Welterweight	Sheldon Westcott	def.	Simon Marini	Submission (guillotine choke)	1	0:28
Lightweight	Josh Machan	def.	Lenny Wheeler	Submission (armbar)	1	3:08
Middleweight	Ryan Machan	def.	Spencer Rohovie	Submission (rear naked choke)	1	3:41
Welterweight	Ryan McGillivary	def.	Andrew Buckland	Submission (kimura)	1	2:04
Lightweight	Mukai Maromo	def.	David Fuentes	Decision (unanimous)	3	5:00
Welterweight	Aaron Zimmerman	def.	Barret Coates	TKO (punches)	1	2:58
Flyweight	Mike Davis	def.	Matt Knysh	TKO (punches)	1	4:09
Featherweight	Allan Munroe	def.	Ryan Knysh	TKO (punches)	2	3:25
Heavyweight	Kurtis Higgins	def.	Cody Cullinan	Submission (guillotine choke)	1	0:38
Lightweight	Mark Sawka	def.	Johnathan Pridham	TKO (punches)	1	3:54
Bantamweight	Sy Jewett	def.	Kellie Cardinal	TKO (punches)	1	1:38
Light Heavyweight	Siarhei Misialik	def.	Brad Butt	TKO (punches)	1	2:11
Featherweight	Deven Jones	def.	Drew Weatherhead	TKO (punches)	1	4:42
Lightweight	Parwez Ghulam	def.	David Isadoro	TKO (punches)	1	1:20

==== AMMA 5 ====
AMMA 5: Uprising
- Promotion: Aggression MMA
- Date: October 1, 2010
- Venue: Edmonton Expo Centre
- City: Edmonton, Alberta, Canada

Event chronology
AMMA 4: Vengeance	AMMA 5: Uprising	AMMA 6: Edmonton

AMMA 5: Uprising was held on October 1, 2010, at the Edmonton Expo Centre in Edmonton, Alberta.

Results

Main Card
Weight class				Method	Round	Time	Notes
Heavyweight	Tim Hague	def.	Travis Wiuff	KO (punch)	1	1:50
Lightweight	Kurt Southern	def.	Mukai Maromo	Submission (triangle choke)	1	2:18
Middleweight	Luke Harris	def.	Siarhei Misialik	Submission (arm triangle choke)	1	1:23
Middleweight	Simon Marini	def.	Jason Gorny	Submission (rear naked choke)	2	4:34
Light Heavyweight	Zach Blader	def.	Devon Neis	TKO (punches)	2	4:22
Middleweight	Cody Krahn	def.	Tim Skidmore	Submission (bar arm choke)	1	0:32
Bantamweight	Corey Lautischer	def.	Adam Bodwell	Submission (guillotine choke)	1	0:25
Catchweight (149lbs)	Mike Davis	def.	Corey Knapp	Submission (rear naked choke)	1	2:06

==== AMMA 6 ====
AMMA 6: Edmonton
- Promotion: Aggression MMA
- Date: March 11, 2011
- Venue: Shaw Conference Centre
- City: Edmonton, Alberta, Canada

Event chronology
AMMA 5: Uprising	AMMA 6: Edmonton	AMMA 7: Confrontation

AMMA 6: Edmonton was held on March 11, 2011, at the Shaw Conference Centre in Edmonton, Alberta.

Results

Main Card
Weight class				Method	Round	Time	Notes
Welterweight	Ryan Ford	def.	Johnny Davis	TKO (punches)	2	2:06
Bantamweight	Josh Hill	def.	Diego Wilson	Decision (unanimous)	5	5:00
Lightweight	Dave Mazany	def.	Shane Campbell	Decision (unanimous)	3	5:00
Featherweight	Adam Lorenz	def.	Will Romero	Decision (unanimous)	3	5:00
Lightweight	Kurt Southern	def.	Brad Cardinal	Decision (unanimous)	3	5:00
Lightweight	Evan Sanguin	def.	Trevor Wright	Submission (guillotine choke)	1	4:56
Lightweight	Mukai Maromo	def.	Tim Tamaki	Submission (rear naked choke)	1	3:30
Middleweight	Jason Gorny	def.	Trent Thorne	TKO (punches)	2	4:57
Welterweight	Mike Scarcello	vs.	Brandt Dewsberry	Draw	3	5:00
Bantamweight	Owen Carr	vs.	Keenan Feeney	Technical Draw	3	5:00

==== AMMA 7 ====
AMMA 7: Confrontation
- Promotion: Aggression MMA
- Date: June 10, 2011
- Venue: Shaw Conference Centre
- City: Edmonton, Alberta, Canada

Event chronology
AMMA 6: Edmonton	AMMA 7: Confrontation	AMMA 8: Unfinished Business

AMMA 7: Confrontation was held on June 10, 2011, at the Shaw Conference Centre in Edmonton, Alberta.

Results

Main Card
Weight class				Method	Round	Time	Notes
Welterweight	Ryan Ford	def.	Nick Hinchliffe	TKO (punches)	3	0:18
Middleweight	Luke Harris	vs.	John Troyer	NC (cage malfunction)	1	3:14
Lightweight	Stephen Beaumont	def.	James Haddad	Decision (unanimous)	3	5:00
Welterweight	Elmer Waterhen	def.	Jason Gorny	Decision (split)	3	5:00
Welterweight	Rio Wells	def.	Mark Burns	Submission (rear naked choke)	2	1:53
Lightweight	James Edwards	def.	Mark Sawka	Decision (majority)	3	5:00
Welterweight	Paapa Inkumsah	def.	Dejan Kajic	Submission (rear naked choke)	1	2:23
Featherweight	Matt Trudeau	def.	Levi Kump	TKO (elbows)	1	3:56

==== AMMA 8 ====
AMMA 8: Unfinished Business
- Promotion: Aggression MMA
- Date: September 16, 2011
- Venue: Shaw Conference Centre
- City: Edmonton, Alberta, Canada

Event chronology
AMMA 7: Confrontation	AMMA 8: Unfinished Business	AMMA 9: Aggression MMA 9

AMMA 8: Unfinished Business was held on September 16, 2011, at the Shaw Conference Centre in Edmonton, Alberta.

Results

Main Card
Weight class				Method	Round	Time	Notes
Welterweight	David Hulett	def.	Ryan Ford	Submission (guillotine choke)	1	1:35
Heavyweight	Tim Hague	def.	Vince Lucero	Submission (guillotine choke)	1	1:14
Light Heavyweight	Nick Penner	def.	Tim Chemelli	Decision (unanimous)	3	5:00
Featherweight	Alvin Robinson	def.	Adam Lorenz	Submission (rear naked choke)	1	0:54
Lightweight	Stephen Beaumont	def.	Warren Phillips	Submission (guillotine choke)	1	1:05
Featherweight	Freddy Assunção	def.	Baz Cunningham	TKO (punches)	1	2:48
Welterweight	Rio Wells	def.	Bill Fraser	Decision (unanimous)	3	5:00
Featherweight	Deven Jones	def.	Keenan Feeney	Submission (rear naked choke)	1	3:20
Welterweight	Mike Hill	def.	Mike Scarcello	Decision (unanimous)	3	5:00

==== AMMA 9 ====
AMMA 9: Aggression MMA 9
- Promotion: Aggression MMA
- Date: February 11, 2012
- Venue: Shaw Conference Centre
- City: Edmonton, Alberta, Canada

Event chronology
AMMA 8: Unfinished Business	AMMA 9: Aggression MMA 9

AMMA 9: Aggression MMA 9 was held on February 11, 2012, at the Shaw Conference Centre in Edmonton, Alberta.

Results

Main Card
Weight class				Method	Round	Time	Notes
Welterweight	Ryan Ford	def.	Ricky Goodall	TKO (elbows)	1	3:37
Light Heavyweight	Victor Valimaki	def.	Tim Chemelli	TKO (punches)	2	1:21
Lightweight	Stephen Beaumont	def.	Nick Heynen	Submission (rear naked choke)	1	2:57
Welterweight	Sheldon Westcott	def.	Jay Jensen	Submission (guillotine choke)	1	0:26
Lightweight	Matt Bagshaw	def.	Greg Welsh	Submission (heel hook)	1	0:38
Middleweight	Jared McComb	def.	Chase Degenhardt	TKO (doctor stoppage)	3	0:45
Middleweight	Luke Harris	def.	Elliot Duff	Submission (rear naked choke)	1	0:52
Welterweight	Paulo Azambuja	def.	Adrian Cardinal	Submission (rear naked choke)	1	0:17
Middleweight	K.B. Bhullar	def.	Simon Shirt	TKO (punches)	1	4:28

=== Aggression / Armageddon Fighting Championship ===
==== AFC 1 ====
AFC 1: Big Bang
- Promotion: Armageddon Fighting Championship
- Date: August 22, 2009
- Venue: Bear Mountain Arena
- City: Victoria, British Columbia, Canada

Event chronology
AFC 1: Big Bang	AFC 2: Aftershock

AFC 1: Big Bang was held on August 22, 2009, at the Bear Mountain Arena in Victoria, British Columbia.

Results

Main Card
Weight class				Method	Round	Time	Notes
Middleweight	Nick Hinchliffe	def.	Dan Chambers	KO (punches)	1	2:49
Middleweight	Daniel MacIver	def.	Duncan Wilson	TKO (punches)	1	1:55
Light Heavyweight	Marcus Hicks	def.	Chris Peak	Submission (rear naked choke)	1	1:38
Lightweight	Matt Bagshaw	def.	Tyler Lynk	KO (punches)	1	4:17
Welterweight	Derek Medler	def.	Brandon MacArthur	TKO (punches)	1	4:45
Lightweight	Gavin Neil	def.	Curtis Demarce	Decision (unanimous)	3	5:00
Featherweight	Shawn Albrecht	def.	Tim Tamaki	TKO (punches)	2	4:29
Featherweight	Nick Driedger	def.	Tim Jefferys	TKO (punches)	1	2:46
Welterweight	Iury Aquiano	def.	Arran Mclellan	KO (punch)	1	4:02
Lightweight	Connor Riddell	def.	Dustin Dickerson	Submission (armbar)	1	1:17
Middleweight	Jonathon Kirk	def.	Ryan Gustafson	TKO (punches)	2	2:14
Bantamweight	Josh Spong	def.	Jason Weare	KO (punches)	2	2:53

==== AFC 2 ====
AFC 2: Aftershock
- Promotion: Armageddon Fighting Championship
- Date: March 6, 2010
- Venue: Bear Mountain Arena
- City: Victoria, British Columbia, Canada

Event chronology
AFC 1: Big Bang	AFC 2: Aftershock	AFC 3: Evolution

AFC 2: Aftershock was held on March 6, 2010, at the Bear Mountain Arena in Victoria, British Columbia.

Results

Main Card
Weight class				Method	Round	Time	Notes
Middleweight	Kalib Starnes	def.	Marcus Hicks	Submission (rear naked choke)	1	1:22
Middleweight	Nick Hinchliffe	def.	Daniel MacIver	KO (punches)	2	2:07
Heavyweight	Phil Friedman	def.	Jason Fairn	Submission (rear naked choke)	1	0:38
Bantamweight	Diego Wilson	def.	Ryan Leef	Submission (rear naked choke)	1	1:58
Heavyweight	Justin Shaw	def.	Nathan Williamson	TKO (doctor stoppage)	1	0:58
Featherweight	Nick Driedger	def.	Patrick Bessarra	TKO (punches)	1	4:42
Welterweight	Derek Medler	def.	Dave Logan	Submission (guillotine choke)	1	0:48
Bantamweight	Josh Spong	def.	Tim Jefferys	TKO (punches)	1	2:38
Welterweight	Josh Bohnen	def.	Chris Jones	Decision (unanimous)	3	5:00
Lightweight	Tristan Connelly	def.	Jimmy Phan	Submission (rear naked choke)	1	2:26
Middleweight	Karel Bergen	def.	Cody Heatherington	TKO (knees)	1	3:35

==== AFC 3 ====
AFC 3: Evolution
- Promotion: Armageddon Fighting Championship
- Date: July 17, 2010
- Venue: Bear Mountain Arena
- City: Victoria, British Columbia, Canada

Event chronology
AFC 2: Aftershock	AFC 3: Evolution	AFC 4: Revelation

AFC 3: Evolution was held on July 17, 2010, at the Bear Mountain Arena in Victoria, British Columbia.

Results

Main Card
Weight class				Method	Round	Time	Notes
Middleweight	Kalib Starnes	def.	Nick Hinchliffe	Submission (armbar)	1	3:49
Light Heavyweight	Robert Drysdale	def.	Bastien Huveneers	Submission (arm triangle choke)	1	1:12
Featherweight	Nick Driedger	def.	Baz Cunningham	Submission (rear naked choke)	1	2:18
Light Heavyweight	Mike Hackert	def.	Daniel MacIver	Decision (unanimous)	3	5:00
Bantamweight	Diego Wilson	def.	Dan Lin	Technical Submission (armbar)	1	0:46
Heavyweight	Justin Shaw	def.	Rob McCormack	TKO (punches and elbows)	1	0:19
Light Heavyweight	Misha Cirkunov	def.	Shawn Pauliuk	Submission (punches)	1	0:57
Welterweight	Derek Medler	def.	Myles Dearden	Submission (punches)	1	2:56
Lightweight	Darcy James	def.	Connor Wood	KO (punches)	1	1:36
Bantamweight	Keri Scarr	vs.	Sarah McLeod	NC	1	5:00
Lightweight	Connor Riddell	vs.	Dan Ring	Draw	3	5:00
Welterweight	Theo Brisley	def.	Iury Aquiano	Submission (guillotine choke)	2	1:14

==== AFC 4 ====
AFC 4: Revelation
- Promotion: Armageddon Fighting Championship
- Date: November 6, 2010
- Venue: Bear Mountain Arena
- City: Victoria, British Columbia, Canada

Event chronology
AFC 3: Evolution	AFC 4: Revelation	AFC 5: Judgement Day

AFC 4: Revelation was held on November 6, 2010, at the Bear Mountain Arena in Victoria, British Columbia.

Results

Main Card
Weight class				Method	Round	Time	Notes
Light Heavyweight	Robert Drysdale	def.	Clay Davidson	Submission (armbar)	1	2:06
Light Heavyweight	Nick Hinchliffe	def.	Mike Hackert	Decision (unanimous)	3	5:00
Welterweight	Derek Medler	def.	Del Melnyk	TKO (punches)	1	3:51
Featherweight	Daniel Swain	def.	Baz Cunningham	Submission (rear naked choke)	1	1:58
Middleweight	Karel Bergen	def.	Todd Stewart	Decision (unanimous)	3	5:00
Light Heavyweight	David Perron	def.	Nathan Swayze	KO (punch)	1	2:52
Welterweight	Jordan Knippelberg	def.	Connor Riddell	Decision (unanimous)	3	5:00
Lightweight	Connor Wood	def.	Dan Laughey	KO (punches)	1	1:30
Lightweight	Dan Ring	def.	Tristan Connelly	Decision (unanimous)	3	5:00
Bantamweight	Corey Gower	def.	Ryan Leef	TKO (punches)	2	1:50
Welterweight	Chris Jones	def.	Theo Brisley	Submission (rear naked choke)	1	3:40

==== AFC 5 ====
AFC 5: Judgement Day
- Promotion: Armageddon Fighting Championship
- Date: April 2, 2011
- Venue: Bear Mountain Arena
- City: Victoria, British Columbia, Canada

Event chronology
AFC 4: Revelation	AFC 5: Judgement Day	AFC 6: Conviction

AFC 5: Judgment Day was held on April 2, 2011, at the Bear Mountain Arena in Victoria, British Columbia.

Results

Main Card
Weight class				Method	Round	Time	Notes
Bantamweight	Sarah Kaufman	def.	Megumi Yabushita	TKO (punches)	3	3:34
Welterweight	Nick Hinchliffe	def.	Ryan Machan	Decision (majority)	3	5:00
Light Heavyweight	Andrew Buckland	def.	David Perron	Submission (guillotine choke)	2	3:47
Welterweight	Derek Medler	def.	Jarod Milko	Submission (rear naked choke)	2	3:30
Featherweight	Nick Driedger	def.	Brendan Frost	Decision (unanimous)	3	5:00
Bantamweight	Dan Lin	def.	Josh Spong	TKO (elbows)	3	3:02
Lightweight	Connor Wood	def.	Dia Grant	TKO (punches)	1	4:29
Middleweight	Karel Bergen	def.	Todd Mabbott	Submission (kimura)	2	4:48
Light Heavyweight	Nathan Swayze	def.	Warren Anderson	Submission (rear naked choke)	3	1:53
Welterweight	Chris Jones	def.	Leif Optland	Submission (heel hook)	1	1:42

==== AFC 6 ====
AFC 6: Conviction
- Promotion: Armageddon Fighting Championship
- Date: June 18, 2011
- Venue: Bear Mountain Arena
- City: Victoria, British Columbia, Canada

Event chronology
AFC 5: Judgement Day	AFC 6: Conviction	AFC 7: Break Out

AFC 6: Conviction was held on June 18, 2011, at the Bear Mountain Arena in Victoria, British Columbia.

Results

Main Card
Weight class				Method	Round	Time	Notes
Middleweight	John Salter	def.	Kalib Starnes	TKO (punches)	2	4:14	(Note: For the AFC Middleweight Championship)
Light Heavyweight	Robert Drysdale	def.	Mike Nickels	Submission (guillotine choke)	1	1:04
Welterweight	Derek Medler	def.	Jaret Evans	TKO (punches)	2	2:06
Featherweight	Baz Cunningham	def.	Corey Gower	Decision (unanimous)	3	5:00
Heavyweight	Paul Cheng	def.	Adam Querido	Decision (unanimous)	3	5:00
Middleweight	Ryan Janes	def.	Duncan Wilson	Submission (rear naked choke)	1	1:17
Lightweight	Dan Ring	def.	Chris Jones	Decision (unanimous)	3	5:00
Middleweight	Karel Bergen	def.	Bill Fraser	Decision (unanimous)	3	5:00
Middleweight	Tristan Connelly	def.	Upneet Rai	Submission (rear naked choke)	1	2:30

==== AFC 7 ====
AFC 7: Break Out
- Promotion: Armageddon Fighting Championship
- Date: November 5, 2011
- Venue: Bear Mountain Arena
- City: Victoria, British Columbia, Canada

Event chronology
AFC 6: Conviction	AFC 7: Break Out	AFC 8: Vengeance

AFC 7: Break Out was held on November 5, 2011, at the Bear Mountain Arena in Victoria, British Columbia.

Results

Main Card
Weight class				Method	Round	Time	Notes
Welterweight	Derek Medler	def.	Brian Grimshaw	Submission (guillotine choke)	1	0:00
Middleweight	Karel Bergen	def.	Dave Logan	Submission (kimura)	1	3:11
Light Heavyweight	Peter Nolan	def.	Paul Cheng	Submission (arm triangle choke)	1	4:06
Light Heavyweight	Nathan Swayze	def.	Brad Robinson	Decision (unanimous)	3	5:00
Featherweight	Matt Trudeau	def.	Tristan Connelly	TKO (retirement)	1	5:00
Bantamweight	Tyler Dolby	def.	Shane Jung	Submission (rear naked choke)	1	2:19
Flyweight	Jean-Marc de Groot	def.	James Pratt	Submission (armbar)	2	0:50
Featherweight	Craig McLean	def.	Blake McVittie	Decision (unanimous)	3	5:00
Bantamweight	Dustin Porter	def.	Sanjeev Sharma	Decision (unanimous)	3	5:00
Lightweight	Johnny Williams	def.	Guy Gauthier	Submission (rear naked choke)	3	1:10
Lightweight	Dillon Brown	def.	Ron Pierce	Decision (unanimous)	3	5:00
Bantamweight	Ty Daggis	def.	Joel Conway	TKO (punches)	2	1:21

==== AFC 8 ====
AFC 8: Vengeance
- Promotion: Aggression Fighting Championship
- Date: April 14, 2012
- Venue: Bear Mountain Arena
- City: Victoria, British Columbia, Canada

Event chronology
AFC 7: Break Out	AFC 8: Vengeance	AFC 9: Inception

AFC 8: Vengeance was held on April 14, 2012, at the Bear Mountain Arena in Victoria, British Columbia.

Results

Main Card
Weight class				Method	Round	Time	Notes
Bantamweight	Diego Wilson	def.	Corey Gower	TKO (punches)	2	1:27
Welterweight	Adam Smith	def.	Karel Bergen	Decision (split)	3	5:00
Lightweight	Bruno Capdeville	def.	Nick Driedger	TKO (doctor stoppage)	1	2:24
Welterweight	Advin Omic	def.	Marcus Vinicios	Submission (armbar)	2	4:42
Middleweight	Ryan Janes	def.	Marcus Hicks	Submission (rear naked choke)	2	2:04
Light Heavyweight	Nathan Swayze	def.	Derek Mrak	Decision (split)	3	5:00
Welterweight	Dejan Kajic	def.	Ash Mashreghi	Decision (split)	3	5:00
Lightweight	Alexi Argyriou	def.	Guy Gauthier	TKO (punches)	1	1:07
Middleweight	Bronson Peterson	def.	Chris Anderson	TKO (punches)	1	1:17
Heavyweight	Dustin Joynson	def.	Dylan Moore	TKO (punches)	3	1:51
Lightweight	Dillon Brown	def.	Brandon Shorter	Submission (rear naked choke)	3	1:30
Lightweight	Dee Obaro	def.	Josh Williams	TKO (punches)	3	2:01

==== AFC 9 ====
AFC 9: Inception
- Promotion: Aggression Fighting Championship
- Date: June 8, 2012
- Venue: Shaw Conference Centre
- City: Edmonton, Alberta, Canada

Event chronology
AFC 8: Vengeance	AFC 9: Inception	AFC 10: Rise

AFC 9: Inception was held on June 8, 2012, at the Shaw Conference Centre in Edmonton, Alberta.

Results

Main Card
Weight class				Method	Round	Time	Notes
Lightweight	Stephen Beaumont	def.	Evan Sanguin	Decision (uniamous)	5	5:00	(Note: For AFC Lightweight Championship)
Light Heavyweight	Tim Chemelli	def.	Simon Marini	Decision (uniamous)	3	5:00
Catchweight (195lbs)	Zach Blader	def.	Andrew Buckland	KO (punches)	1	0:10
Featherweight	Tito Jones	def.	Deven Jones	KO (punch)	1	0:21
Catchweight (156lbs)	Robbie Merrill	def.	Joe Keesick	Submission (rear naked choke)	1	3:14
Welterweight	Mike Newton	def.	Adrian Cardinal	Submission (rear naked choke)	1	1:50
Heavyweight	Nick Dragich	def.	Matthew Swimmer	TKO (punches)	1	2:30
Middleweight	K.B. Bhullar	def.	Ben Snyder	KO (head kick and punches)	1	2:46
Catchweight (160lbs)	Nick Heynen	def.	T.J. Penner	Decision (unanimous)	3	5:00

==== AFC 10 ====
AFC 10: Rise
- Promotion: Aggression Fighting Championship
- Date: June 15, 2012
- Venue: Telus Convention Centre
- City: Calgary, Alberta, Canada

Event chronology
AFC 9: Inception	AFC 10: Rise	AFC 11: Takeover

AFC 10: Rise was held on June 15, 2012, at the Telus Convention Centre in Calgary, Alberta.

Results

Main Card
Weight class				Method	Round	Time	Notes
Middleweight	Joe Doerksen	def.	Joel Powell	Submission (rear naked choke)	2	3:25
Heavyweight	Smealinho Rama	def.	Craig Hudson	Submission (rear naked choke)	1	3:50
Bantamweight	Noah Ali	def.	Matt Knysh	Submission (guillotine choke)	1	1:57
Welterweight	Mark Dobie	def.	Jason Gorny	Submission (rear naked choke)	1	1:26
Lightweight	Nathan Wilkins	def.	Hayden Harrison	Submission (triangle choke)	3	2:49
Lightweight	Trent House	def.	Adam Wills	Submission (triangle choke)	3	2:44
Catchweight (195lbs)	Darcy McKenna	def.	Mike Downey	Submission (punches)	1	2:00
Lightweight	Chris Darula	def.	Chris Campbell	Decision (unanimous)	3	3:00

==== AFC 11 ====
AFC 11: Takeover
- Promotion: Aggression Fighting Championship
- Date: September 15, 2012
- Venue: Winnipeg Convention Centre
- City: Winnipeg, Manitoba, Canada

Event chronology
AFC 10: Rise	AFC 11: Takeover	AFC 12: Domination

AFC 11: Takeover was held on September 15, 2012, at the Winnipeg Convention Centre in Winnipeg, Manitoba.

Results

Main Card
Weight class				Method	Round	Time	Notes
Middleweight	Joe Doerksen	def.	Kalib Starnes	Decision (unanimous)	3	5:00
Catchweight (140lbs)	Curtis Brigham	def.	Matt Trudeau	Submission (rear naked choke)	1	4:55
Welterweight	Tyson Steele	def.	Jarod Milko	Decision (unanimous)	3	5:00
Bantamweight	Agostino DeNatale	def.	Chuck Mady	Submission (punches)	2	2:08
Catchweight (150lbs)	Dominick Blais	def.	Yoon Heo	Decision (unanimous)	3	5:00
Catchweight (137lbs)	Louis Fisette	def.	Allan Munroe	Submission (rear naked choke)	1	2:41
Featherweight	Jon Henderson	def.	Dwight Sutherland	Decision (unanimous)	3	5:00
Catchweight (162lbs)	Mark Durant	def.	Joe Keesick	Submission (guillotine choke)	1	4:17
Lightweight	Tristan Connelly	def.	Cory Houston	Submission (rear naked choke)	1	4:47
Catchweight (171lbs)	Mariusz Książkiewicz	def.	Dejan Kajic	Decision (unanimous)	3	5:00
Catchweight (140lbs)	Sarah Moras	def.	Christina Barry	Technical Submission (armbar)	1	1:33
Welterweight	Martin Trendota	def.	Chris Jones	Submission (triangle choke)	2	0:43

==== AFC 12 ====
AFC 12: Domination
- Promotion: Aggression Fighting Championship
- Date: November 2, 2012
- Venue: Telus Convention Centre
- City: Calgary, Alberta, Canada

Event chronology
AFC 11: Takeover	AFC 12: Domination	AFC 13: Natural Selection

AFC 12: Domination was held on November 2, 2012, at the Telus Convention Centre in Calgary, Alberta.

Results

Main Card
Weight class				Method	Round	Time	Notes
Heavyweight	Paul Cheng	def.	Ryan Hunter	KO (punches)	1	1:42
Bantamweight	Sheila Bird	def.	Christina Barry	KO (punches)	1	0:11
Catchweight (177lbs)	Joel Powell	def.	Andrew Buckland	Submission (rear naked choke)	1	1:30
Bantamweight	Allan Munroe	def.	Owen Carr	Decision (unanimous)	3	5:00
Lightweight	Tony Stiles	def.	Trevor Wright	Submission (rear naked choke)	2	1:57
Featherweight	Nathan Wilkins	def.	Jon Henderson	Submission (triangle choke)	2	4:08
Lightweight	Trent House	def.	Mitchell Carlson	TKO (leg kicks and punches)	2	2:35
Middleweight	Dusty Kramps	def.	Josh Fried	Decision (unanimous)	3	3:00
Lightweight	Andrew Kloot	def.	Keegan Cassell	TKO (punches)	1	0:22

==== AFC 13 ====
AFC 13: Natural Selection
- Promotion: Aggression Fighting Championship
- Date: November 3, 2012
- Venue: Bear Mountain Arena
- City: Victoria, British Columbia, Canada

Event chronology
AFC 12: Domination	AFC 13: Natural Selection	AFC 14: Invasion

AFC 13: Natural Selection was held on November 3, 2012, at the Bear Mountain Arena in Victoria, British Columbia.

Results

Main Card
Weight class				Method	Round	Time	Notes
Catchweight (160lbs)	John Alessio	vs.	Dave Mazany	NC (eye poke)	1	N/A
Middleweight	Kendall Grove	def.	Ariel Gandulla	TKO (punches)	2	4:42
Bantamweight	Louis Fisette	def.	Diego Wilson	KO (punch)	1	0:37
Middleweight	David Perron	def.	Daniel MacIver	Submission (guillotine choke)	1	2:07
Middleweight	Ryan Janes	def.	Keto Allen	Decision (unanimous)	3	5:00
Lightweight	Myles Merola	def.	Tristan Connelly	Decision (unanimous)	3	5:00
Catchweight (180lbs)	Miles Anstead	def.	Bill Fraser	Decision (unanimous)	3	5:00
Lightweight	Alexi Argyriou	def.	Andy Jack	Submission (guillotine choke)	2	1:19
Catchweight (152lbs)	Dillion Brown	def.	Johnny Williams	Submission (rear naked choke)	1	2:08
Featherweight	Guy Gauthier	def.	Steven Best	Decision (unanimous)	3	5:00

==== AFC 14 ====
AFC 14: Invasion
- Promotion: Aggression Fighting Championship
- Date: November 23, 2012
- Venue: Shaw Conference Centre
- City: Edmonton, Alberta, Canada

Event chronology
AFC 13: Natural Selection	AFC 14: Invasion	AFC 15: The Ides

AFC 14: Invasion was held on November 23, 2012, at the Shaw Conference Centre in Edmonton, Alberta.

Results

Main Card
Weight class				Method	Round	Time	Notes
Lightweight	Shane Campbell	def.	Stephen Beaumont	Submission (guillotine choke)	1	2:50	(Note: For AFC Lightweight Championship)
Light Heavyweight	Tim Chemelli	def.	Mike Kent	KO (punch)	2	1:06
Featherweight	Lenny Wheeler	def.	Adam Lorenz	Submission (guillotine choke)	1	0:33
Middleweight	K.B. Bhullar	def.	Jason Gorny	KO (knee)	1	1:17
Welterweight	Joe Keesick	def.	Mike Newton	TKO (corner stoppage)	2	5:00
Lightweight	Brent Harvie	def.	Cole Campbell	Submission (rear naked choke)	1	1:04
Welterweight	Travis Cardinal	def.	Ivan MacKenzie	Submission (rear naked choke)	1	1:27

==== AFC 15 ====
AFC 15: The Ides
- Promotion: Aggression Fighting Championship
- Date: March 15, 2013
- Venue: Telus Convention Centre
- City: Calgary, Alberta, Canada

Event chronology
AFC 14: Invasion	AFC 15: The Ides	AFC 16: Uprising

AFC 15: The Ides was held on March 15, 2013, at the Telus Convention Centre in Calgary, Alberta.

Results

Main Card
Weight class				Method	Round	Time	Notes
Welterweight	Michael Hill	def.	Josh Kitchen	TKO (punches)	1	4:43
Lightweight	Trent House	def.	Nathan Wilkins	Submission (liver kick)	2	1:57
Welterweight	Jaret Evans	def.	Joe Keesick	Submission (kimura)	1	1:20
Bantamweight	Owen Carr	vs.	Mike O'Neil	NC	3	5:00
Catchweight (160lbs)	Aaron Armstrong	def.	Matt Krayco	Submission (rear naked choke)	3	1:02
Lightweight	Dia Grant	def.	Jesse Arnett	Submission (armbar)	1	2:26
Bantamweight	Noah Ali	def.	Mike Lapierre	KO (head kick)	1	0:27
Featherweight	Charmaine Tweet	def.	Sy Jewett	Submission (rear naked choke)	1	2:25
Middleweight	Dusty Kramps	def.	Zach Manywounds	Submission (triangle choke)	1	1:31
Bantamweight	Zamir Safi	def.	Will Monzon	Decision (unanimous)	3	3:00

==== AFC 16 ====
AFC 16: Uprising
- Promotion: Aggression Fighting Championship
- Date: March 23, 2013
- Venue: Winnipeg Convention Centre
- City: Winnipeg, Manitoba, Canada

Event chronology
AFC 15: The Ides	AFC 16: Uprising	AFC 17: Anarchy

AFC 16: Uprising was held on March 23, 2013, at the Winnipeg Convention Centre in Winnipeg, Manitoba.

Results

Main Card
Weight class				Method	Round	Time	Notes
Bantamweight	Curtis Brigham	def.	Mike Adams	Submission (armbar)	4	1:19	(Note: For AFC Bantamweight Championship)
Catchweight (140lbs)	Louis Fisette	def.	Brent Fryia	Submission (armbar)	1	1:34
Welterweight	Jarod Milko	def.	Chris Stranger	TKO (punches)	2	0:47
Lightweight	Travis Gervais	def.	Buddy Wright	TKO (punches)	1	3:34
Featherweight	Dwight Sutherland	def.	Mitch Fryia	Submission (triangle choke)	2	2:23
Lightweight	Lee Gaudet	def.	Mark Durant	Submission (triangle choke)	1	3:44
Welterweight	Mariusz Książkiewicz	def.	Ash Mashreghi	Submission (rear naked choke)	1	1:55

==== AFC 17 ====
AFC 17: Anarchy
- Promotion: Aggression Fighting Championship
- Date: March 23, 2013
- Venue: Shaw Conference Centre
- City: Edmonton, Alberta, Canada

Event chronology
AFC 16: Uprising	AFC 17: Anarchy	AFC 18: Mayhem

AFC 17: Anarchy was held on March 23, 2013, at the Shaw Conference Centre in Edmonton, Alberta.

Results

Main Card
Weight class				Method	Round	Time	Notes
Light Heavyweight	Razak Al-Hassan	def.	Tim Chemelli	Submission (rear naked choke)	1	4:13	(Note: For AFC Light Heavyweight Championship)
Welterweight	Ryan Ford	def.	Brendan Tierney	KO (punch)	2	3:11
Lightweight	Stephen Beaumont	def.	Tim Jenson	Submission (rear naked choke)	1	3:13
Welterweight	Sheldon Westcott	def.	Nic Herron-Webb	Decision (unanimous)	3	5:00
Catchweight (180lbs)	Steve Dubeck	def.	Simon Shirt	Submission (guillotine choke)	1	0:33
Light Heavyweight	Teddy Ash	def.	Terick Carter	TKO (punches)	2	3:55
Catchweight (159lbs)	Mark White	def.	Tony Touch	TKO (punches)	2	1:24
Catchweight (196lbs)	Aaron Bosiak	def.	Boris Babski	TKO (punches)	2	0:26

==== AFC 18 ====
AFC 18: Mayhem
- Promotion: Aggression Fighting Championship
- Date: May 19, 2013
- Venue: Bear Mountain Arena
- City: Victoria, British Columbia, Canada

Event chronology
AFC 17: Anarchy	AFC 18: Mayhem	AFC 19: Undisputed

AFC 18: Mayhem was held on May 19, 2013, at the Bear Mountain Arena in Victoria, British Columbia.

Results

Main Card
Weight class				Method	Round	Time	Notes
Welterweight	Joel Powell	def.	Michael Hill	Decision (split)	3	5:00
Middleweight	Kalib Starnes	def.	Dave Perron	TKO (punches)	2	4:05
Middleweight	Tristan Connelly	def.	Jonathan Dubois	Submission (rear naked choke)	1	2:48
Welterweight	Miles Anstead	def.	Ash Mashreghi	Submission (guillotine choke)	2	0:40
Featherweight	Dillon Brown	def.	Taylor Parker	Submission (rear naked choke)	1	2:02
Catchweight (160lbs)	Alexi Argyriou	def.	Thomas Proppe	TKO (punches)	1	1:45
Featherweight	Guy Gauthier	def.	Shane Jung	Submission (guillotine choke)	2	1:20
Featherweight	Ty Daggis	def.	JR Cuevas	Decision (unanimous)	3	3:00
Catchweight (148lbs)	Marcos da Silva	def.	Jason Driese	Decision (split)	3	3:00

==== AFC 19 ====
AFC 19: Undisputed
- Promotion: Aggression Fighting Championship
- Date: July 5, 2013
- Venue: Shaw Conference Centre
- City: Edmonton, Alberta, Canada

Event chronology
AFC 18: Mayhem	AFC 19: Undisputed	AFC 20: Stampede Fight Night

AFC 19: Undisputed was held on July 5, 2013, at the Shaw Conference Centre in Edmonton, Alberta.

Results

Main Card
Weight class				Method	Round	Time	Notes
Welterweight	Ryan Ford	def.	Michael Hill	Submission (rear naked choke)	5	4:29	(Note: For AFC Welterweight Championship)
Lightweight	Jesse Ronson	def.	Shane Campbell	Submission (rear naked choke)	2	1:59	(Note: For AFC Lightweight Championship)
Catchweight (215lbs)	Dwayne Lewis	def.	Tim Chemelli	Decision (unanimous)	3	5:00
Lightweight	Jason Saggo	def.	Stephen Beaumont	Submission (rear naked choke)	1	3:46
Heavyweight	Kalib Starnes	def.	Tim Hague	Decision (unanimous)	3	5:00
Middleweight	K.B. Bhullar	def.	Derek Parker	Decision (unanimous)	3	5:00
Catchweight (200lbs)	Teddy Ash	def.	Bobby Kalmakoff	Submission (rear naked choke)	1	1:30
Welterweight	Jemark Brady	def.	Travis Cardinal	Decision (unanimous)	3	5:00
Bantamweight	Ben Jansen	def.	Radley Da Silva	Submission (rear naked choke)	3	1:24
Catchweight (180lbs)	Steve Dubeck	def.	Marcus Hicks	TKO (punches)	2	2:30
Featherweight	Sarah McRann	def.	Fairlynn Smallchild	TKO (punches)	1	3:20
Catchweight (160lbs)	Ralph Mendita	def.	Tony Touch	Submission (rear naked choke)	1	1:19

==== AFC 20 ====
AFC 20: Stampede Fight Night
- Promotion: Aggression Fighting Championship
- Date: July 12, 2013
- Venue: Telus Convention Centre
- City: Calgary, Alberta, Canada

Event chronology
AFC 19: Undisputed	AFC 20: Stampede Fight Night	AFC 21:

AFC 20: Stampede Fight Night was held on July 12, 2013, at the Telus Convention Centre in Calgary, Alberta.

Results

Main Card
Weight class				Method	Round	Time	Notes
Bantamweight	Noah Ali	def.	Mike O'Neill	Submission (guillotine choke)	1	1:45
Lightweight	Trent House	def.	Brandon Shorter	KO (punch)	2	0:36
Bantamweight	Owen Carr	def.	Brent Fryia	Submission (front choke)	2	4:40
Lightweight	Matthew Spisak	def.	Matt Krayco	Submission (rear naked choke)	1	3:35
Welterweight	Marcus Vinicios	def.	Dia Grant	Submission (rear naked choke)	1	2:55
Featherweight	Corey Houston	def.	Nathan Wilkins	Submission (triangle choke)	1	2:30
Middleweight	Dusty Kramps	vs.	Zach Manywounds	NC (groin kick)	1	0:42
Featherweight	Will Monzon	def.	Jared Silverthorn	TKO (punches)	1	0:45
Welterweight	Brandon Ypma	def.	Beau Bentley	TKO (punches)	2	3:38

== Event locations ==
These cities have hosted the following numbers of AFC and Aggression MMA events as of AFC 20

- Canada (29)

Edmonton, Alberta – 12
Calgary, Alberta - 4
Winnipeg, Manitoba - 2
Vernon, British Columbia - 1
Victoria, British Columbia - 10
