= Jesse Ronson =

Canadian mixed martial arts fighter

- Born: December 24, 1985 (age 40); London, Ontario, Canada
- Other names: The Body Snatcher
- Height: 5 ft 10 in (1.78 m)
- Weight: 171 lb (78 kg; 12.2 st)
- Division: Lightweight; Welterweight
- Reach: 72 in (180 cm)
- Style: Kickboxing
- Fighting out of: London, Ontario, Canada
- Team: Adrenaline Training Centre
- Years active: 2009–present

Mixed martial arts record
- Total: 41
- Wins: 28
- By knockout: 13
- By submission: 11
- By decision: 4
- Losses: 12
- By knockout: 3
- By submission: 2
- By decision: 7
- No contests: 1

Other information
- Mixed martial arts record from Sherdog

Jesse Ronson (born December 24, 1985) is a Canadian mixed martial artist who competed the Ultimate Fighting Championship (UFC) in the Lightweight division. A professional fighter since 2009, he has previously competed in promotions such as UFC, Aggression FC, Score Fighting Series and TKO Major League MMA, where he was the former Lightweight and Welterweight Champion. Ronson is currently signed to BKB Bare Knuckle Boxing.

== Background ==
A native of the streets of London, Ontario, he claims he fought a lot in the streets as a young kid. Ronson brags "...Being naturally good [at fighting], I figured I should make something of it instead of doing it on the streets and potentially getting arrested or charged." A wrestler in high school, he decided to start training in kickboxing and boxing in 2006 and switched over to MMA not long after. He got his nickname, "Body Snatcher," in 2006, after he had 3 fights in 3 days and won all three by first-round TKO with body shots.

== Mixed martial arts career ==
=== Early career ===
He made his professional MMA debut on November 28, 2009, at Elite 1 - Resurrection in Moncton. He defeated local favorite Eric St. Pierre with a first-round KO. He went on to win his next three bouts, but suffered his first career loss against Lindsey Hawkes at a catch weight of 163lbs.

He defeated current UFC fighter Jason Saggo by decision in August 2011. After this impressive showing, he received a shot at the AM Ford Fight Night Lightweight Championship. He defeated the champ, Brad Causey (who was coming in at 10-1 into the bout), on April 14, 2012, at AM Ford Night 2012 - Demolition via first-round KO to capture the belt.

At Score Fighting Series 7, Ronson defeated WEC and Strikeforce vet Ryan Healy, and received a shot at the Aggression FC Lightweight Championship on July 5, 2013, against Shane Campbell at AFC 19: Undisputed, where he captured the belt with a second round submission victory.

=== Ultimate Fighting Championship ===
On August 22, 2013, the UFC announced that it had signed Jesse Ronson to replace an injured Mark Bocek to take on Michel Prazeres at UFC 165 in Toronto. He lost the fight via split decision.

Ronson faced Francisco Trinaldo on January 2, 2014, at UFC Fight Night: Machida vs. Mousasi in Brazil, but lost again via split decision.

Ronson next fought Kevin Lee on July 6 at The Ultimate Fighter 19 Finale. Ronson was handed his third split decision loss in the UFC, and his third consecutive loss overall.

=== Post-UFC ===
Ronson was released after racking up three straight losses, and went on to fight Dom O'Grady at PFC 3 - Showdown in the Downtown on October 18, 2014, in London, where he dominated and won by way of TKO in the second round.

After winning at Abu Dhabi Warriors 2 against Gadji Zaipulaev by the way of D'Arce choke, he would lose by unanimous decision to Alexander Sarnavskiy on October 3, 2015, at Abu Dhabi Warriors 3.

Ronson was scheduled to face Stephen Beaumont at XFFC 8. However, Beaumont pulled out due to injury and Ronson instead faced Matt MacGrath for the XFFC Welterweight title in Grande Prairie, Alberta on December 11, 2015, losing the bout via unanimous decision.

He would follow that performance by losing to Matt Dwyer by unanimous decision on July 8, 2016, at XFFC 10, but would follow that with 5 straight wins on the regional scene, Ronson was scheduled to face Carlos Diego Ferreira on December 8, 2018, at UFC 231, replacing an injured John Makdessi. However, on December 4, 2018. It was announced that Ronson was pulled out of the fight due to being too heavy to safely make Lightweight and was released from UFC.

Instead he signed with Professional Fighters League (PFL) to take on Natan Schulte on July 25, 2019, at PFL 5, in a bout that he would lose by unanimous decision.

Ronson made his sophomore PFL performance against Nikolay Aleksakhin on October 11, 2019, at PFL 7, losing by TKO stoppage in the first round.

=== Return to Ultimate Fighting Championship ===
After rebounding with a first round rear-naked choke against Troy Lamson at BTC 9, Ronson faced Nicolas Dalby, replacing Danny Roberts on July 26, 2020, at UFC on ESPN 14. He won the fight via submission in round one, earning his first win in the promotion. This win also earned him the Performance of the Night award. The fight result was overturned to a no contest after USADA handed Ronson a 22-month suspension for testing positive for the banned, performance enhancing drug, Metandienone, making him ineligible to fight again until March 22, 2022.

Ronson faced Rafa García on April 16, 2022, at UFC on ESPN 34. He lost the fight via rear-naked choke in round two.

Ronson was scheduled to face Vinc Pichel on October 1, 2022, at UFC Fight Night 211. However, Pichel withdraw due to an undisclosed injury and was replaced by Joaquim Silva. He lost the bout in the second round, getting dropped with a flying knee and then getting finished with ground and pound.

In late October 2022, it was reported that Ronson was released by UFC.

=== Post-UFC 2.0 ===
In his first bout post UFC, Ronson faced Nordin Asrih on December 10, 2022, at BTC 18, where he won the bout via first-round rear-naked choke.

Ronson then challenged Robert Seres for the Samourai MMA Super Lightweight Championship on March 11, 2023 at Samourai MMA 5, winning the bout and title via first round rear-naked choke.

Ronson defended his title against fellow UFC vet Kazula Vargas on May 26, 2023 at Samourai MMA 6, winning the bout in the first round after Vargas tapped out due to a liver shot.

Ronson faced Ricardo Chavez on August 5, 2023 at BTC 21 for the vacant BTC Welterweight Championship, winning the title and bout via TKO stoppage 56 seconds into the bout.

Ronson faced Robert Hale on November 18, 2023 at BTC 22, winning the bout via first round TKO.

Ronson faced Anthony Njokuani at Gamebred Bareknuckle MMA 7 on March 2, 2024. Ronson won by a kimura submission in the first round.

== Championships and accomplishments ==
=== Mixed martial arts ===
- Ultimate Fighting Championship
  - Performance of the Night (One time) vs. Nicolas Dalby
  - Tied (Zhalgas Zhumagulov & Dennis Bermudez) for most consecutive split decision losses in UFC history (3)
- TKO Major League MMA
  - TKO Welterweight Champion (One time)
  - TKO Lightweight Champion (One time)
- Aggression Fighting Championship
  - AFC Lightweight Championship (One time)
- AM Ford Fight Night
  - AMFFN Lightweight Champion (One time)

=== Boxing ===
- Canadian Amateur Boxing Association
  - Provincial boxing champion

=== Kickboxing ===
- Kickboxing Canada
  - Canadian Low-Kick Middleweight Champion
  - Canadian Full Contact Middleweight Champion
  - Provincial Full Contact Middleweight champion
- World Pan-Amateur Kickboxing Association
  - WPKA Full Contact Super Middleweight Champion
  - WPKA K-1 Super Middleweight Champion

== Mixed martial arts record ==
Professional record breakdown
41 matches	28 wins	12 losses
By knockout	13	3
By submission	11	2
By decision	4	7
No contests	1	

Res.	Record	Opponent	Method	Event	Date	Round	Time	Location	Notes
Win	28–12 (1)	Curtis Millender	Submission (rear-naked choke)	Gamebred Bareknuckle MMA 8	November 15, 2024	1	4:49	Biloxi, Mississippi, United States	Catchweight (175 lb) bout. Bare knuckle MMA.
Win	27–12 (1)	Anthony Njokuani	Submission (kimura)	Gamebred Bareknuckle MMA 7	March 2, 2024	1	4:26	Orlando, Florida, United States	Bare knuckle MMA.
Win	26–12 (1)	Robert Hale	TKO (punches)	BTC 22	November 18, 2023	1	3:54	Burlington, Ontario, Canada	Catchweight (180 lb) bout.
Win	25–12 (1)	Ricardo Chavez	TKO (punches)	BTC 21	August 5, 2023	1	0:56	Kitchener, Ontario, Canada	Won the vacant BTC Welterweight Championship.
Win	24–12 (1)	Kazula Vargas	TKO (submission to punches)	Samourai MMA 6	May 26, 2023	1	1:35	Gatineau, Canada	Defended the SMMA Super Lightweight Championship.
Win	23–12 (1)	Robert Seres	Submission (rear-naked choke)	Samourai MMA 5	March 11, 2023	1	0:42	Laval, Quebec, Canada	Won the SMMA Super Lightweight Championship.
Win	22–12 (1)	Nordin Asrih	Submission (rear-naked choke)	BTC 18	December 10, 2022	1	3:32	Burlington, Ontario, Canada	Catchweight (165 lb) bout.
Loss	21–12 (1)	Joaquim Silva	TKO (knee and punches)	UFC Fight Night: Dern vs. Yan	October 1, 2022	2	3:08	Las Vegas, Nevada, United States	
Loss	21–11 (1)	Rafa García	Submission (rear-naked choke)	UFC on ESPN: Luque vs. Muhammad 2	April 16, 2022	2	4:50	Las Vegas, Nevada, United States	Return to Lightweight.
NC	21–10 (1)	Nicolas Dalby	NC (overturned)	UFC on ESPN: Whittaker vs. Till	July 26, 2020	1	2:48	Abu Dhabi, United Arab Emirates	Performance of the Night. Originally a submission (rear-naked choke) win for Ronson; overturned after he tested positive for metandienone.
Win	21–10	Troy Lamson	Submission (rear-naked choke)	BTC 9	February 29, 2020	1	4:16	Kitchener, Ontario, Canada	Catchweight (160 lb) bout.
Loss	20–10	Nikolay Aleksakhin	TKO (punches)	PFL 7 (2019)	October 11, 2019	1	3:37	Las Vegas, Nevada, United States	Return to Welterweight. 2019 PFL Welterweight Tournament Alternate bout.
Loss	20–9	Natan Schulte	Decision (unanimous)	PFL 5 (2019)	July 25, 2019	3	5:00	Atlantic City, New Jersey, United States	
Win	20–8	Michael Dufort	Decision (split)	TKO 44	September 21, 2018	5	5:00	Quebec City, Quebec, Canada	Won the vacant TKO Welterweight Championship.
Win	19–8	Derek Gauthier	TKO (punches)	TKO 41	December 8, 2017	1	1:10	Montreal, Quebec, Canada	Won the vacant TKO Lightweight Championship.
Win	18–8	Jeremie Capony	Submission (rear-naked choke)	ACB 72	October 14, 2017	2	1:20	Montreal, Quebec, Canada	
Win	17–8	Derek Gauthier	TKO (punches)	TKO 38	April 7, 2017	3	3:49	Montreal, Quebec, Canada	
Win	16–8	Jimmy Spicuzza	TKO (knees and punch)	TKO 36	November 4, 2016	2	3:06	Montreal, Quebec, Canada	Return to Lightweight.
Loss	15–8	Matt Dwyer	Decision (unanimous)	Xcessive Force FC 10	July 8, 2016	3	5:00	Grande Prairie, Alberta, Canada	
Loss	15–7	Matt MacGrath	Decision (unanimous)	Xcessive Force FC 9	April 15, 2016	5	5:00	Grande Prairie, Alberta, Canada	Return to Welterweight. For the XFFC Welterweight Championship.
Loss	15–6	Alexander Sarnavskiy	Decision (unanimous)	Abu Dhabi Warriors 3	October 3, 2015	3	5:00	Abu Dhabi, United Arab Emirates	
Win	15–5	Gadji Zaipulaev	Submission (brabo choke)	Abu Dhabi Warriors 2	March 26, 2015	2	3:24	Abu Dhabi, United Arab Emirates	
Win	14–5	Dom O'Grady	TKO (punches)	Provincial FC 3	October 18, 2014	2	0:45	London, Ontario, Canada	Catchweight (171 lb) bout.
Loss	13–5	Kevin Lee	Decision (split)	The Ultimate Fighter: Team Edgar vs. Team Penn Finale	July 6, 2014	3	5:00	Las Vegas, Nevada, United States	
Loss	13–4	Francisco Trinaldo	Decision (split)	UFC Fight Night: Machida vs. Mousasi	February 15, 2014	3	5:00	Jaraguá do Sul, Brazil	
Loss	13–3	Michel Prazeres	Decision (split)	UFC 165	September 21, 2013	3	5:00	Toronto, Ontario, Canada	
Win	13–2	Shane Campbell	Submission (rear-naked choke)	Aggression FC 19	July 5, 2013	2	1:59	Edmonton, Alberta, Canada	Won the AFC Lightweight Championship.
Win	12–2	Ryan Healy	Decision (unanimous)	Score Fighting Series 7	November 23, 2012	3	5:00	Hamilton, Ontario, Canada	
Win	11–2	Alex Ricci	Decision (unanimous)	Score Fighting Series 5	August 25, 2012	3	5:00	Hamilton, Ontario, Canada	Catchweight (156 lb) bout.
Win	10–2	Eric St. Pierre	TKO (punches)	Elite 1: Redemption	July 28, 2012	1	2:17	Moncton, New Brunswick, Canada	Catchweight (160 lb) bout.
Win	9–2	Brad Causey	KO (punches)	AM Ford Fight Night 2012: Demolition	April 14, 2012	1	4:54	Trail, British Columbia, Canada	Won the AMFFN Lightweight Championship.
Win	8–2	Tony Hervey	Submission (rear-naked choke)	Score Fighting Series 3	December 3, 2011	2	4:25	Sarnia, Ontario, Canada	
Win	7–2	Jason Saggo	Decision (split)	Global Warriors FC 1	August 13, 2011	3	5:00	Hamilton, Ontario, Canada	Return to Lightweight.
Win	6–2	Brandon Chagnon	TKO (punches)	SITH: Slammer in the Hammer	June 17, 2011	1	4:40	Hamilton, Ontario, Canada	Welterweight bout.
Loss	5–2	Mike Ricci	TKO (punches)	Ringside MMA 10	April 9, 2011	1	3:12	Montreal, Quebec, Canada	Catchweight (157 lb) bout; Ricci missed weight.
Win	5–1	Alka Matewa	Submission (armbar)	Wreck MMA: Strong and Proud	January 28, 2011	1	4:51	Gatineau, Quebec, Canada	Catchweight (165 lb) bout.
Loss	4–1	Lindsey Hawkes	Submission (rear-naked choke)	Canadian FC 6	October 8, 2010	1	4:47	Winnipeg, Manitoba, Canada	
Win	4–0	Mark Durant	Submission (rear-naked choke)	Canadian FC 5	June 4, 2010	1	4:51	Winnipeg, Manitoba, Canada	
Win	3–0	Mike Thibodeau	KO (punches)	Elite 1: First Blood	April 24, 2010	2	2:34	Moncton, New Brunswick, Canada	
Win	2–0	Luis Cepeda-Javier	TKO (punches)	Canadian FC 4	February 26, 2010	2	3:17	Winnipeg, Manitoba, Canada	
Win	1–0	Eric St. Pierre	KO (punches)	Elite 1: Resurrection	November 28, 2009	1	3:52	Moncton, New Brunswick, Canada	
