= Claude Patrick =

Canadian mixed martial artist

- Born: June 14, 1980 (age 46); Mississauga, Ontario, Canada
- Other names: The Prince
- Height: 5 ft 11 in (1.80 m)
- Weight: 170 lb (77 kg; 12 st)
- Division: Welterweight
- Reach: 75 in (191 cm)
- Fighting out of: Toronto, Ontario, Canada
- Team: Blackzilians; Elite Training Center
- Rank: Black Belt in Brazilian Jiu-Jitsu
- Years active: 2002–2011

Mixed martial arts record
- Total: 16
- Wins: 14
- By knockout: 3
- By submission: 9
- By decision: 2
- Losses: 2
- By decision: 2

Other information
- Mixed martial arts record from Sherdog
- Last updated on: October 17, 2010

Claude Patrick (born June 14, 1980) is a Canadian retired mixed martial artist. Patrick most recently competed in the Ultimate Fighting Championship (UFC), fighting in their Welterweight division.

== Early life ==
Claude Patrick was born and raised in Mississauga, Ontario, just outside Toronto. His parents are from Jamaica. Patrick's martial arts journey started with karate at the age of thirteen. His parents signed him up for three months, then he took up Muay Thai and jiu-jitsu, and has been using those styles ever since. He went to school at Port Credit Secondary School in Mississauga.

== Mixed martial arts ==
Patrick made his professional debut in 2002. He has fought for smaller promotions, including King of the Cage Canada, The Fight Club and the International Fight League. In 2006 he moved to Montreal, Quebec, for eight months to train with Georges St-Pierre. Before signing with the UFC, he amassed a career of 11 wins and 1 loss.

=== Ultimate Fighting Championship ===
In March 2010, the UFC announced it had signed Patrick to a four-fight contract.

He made his UFC debut on against Ricardo Funch on June 12, 2010, at UFC 115. In the second round, Patrick submitted his opponent with a guillotine choke.

Patrick next defeated TUF 9 winner James Wilks via unanimous decision at UFC 120 on October 16, 2010.

Patrick faced Daniel Roberts on April 30, 2011, at UFC 129. Patrick won via unanimous decision in a close fight after winning the first two rounds.

Patrick replaced an injured Rory MacDonald at UFC 140 and faced Brian Ebersole, losing for the first time in the UFC via split decision.

Patrick was expected to face James Head on July 21, 2012, at UFC 149. However, Patrick was forced out of the bout with an injury and replaced by Brian Ebersole.

After not stepping into the octagon for two years, Patrick was finally healthy and looking for a spot on the UFC 174 card in Vancouver, British Columbia. However, Patrick never had a fight scheduled for the event.

== Personal life ==
Patrick hails from Mississauga, Ontario. He trains with UFC fighters Mark Bocek and Sean Pierson and co-owns the a BJJ & Mixed Martial Arts Academy in Mississauga.

Patrick was the victim of a highly publicized taser gun attack following an MMA event in Gatineau, Quebec. He woke up two days later in the hospital after doctors put him in a medically induced coma. He states that he has no recollection of the attack.

== Championship and accomplishments ==
=== Mixed martial arts ===
- Ultimate Fighting Championship
  - UFC.com Awards
    - 2010: Ranked #10 Newcomer of the Year
- The Fight Club
  - TFC Canadian Welterweight Championship (One time)

== Mixed martial arts record ==
Professional record breakdown
| 16 matches | 14 wins | 2 losses |
| By knockout | 3 | 0 |
| By submission | 9 | 0 |
| By decision | 2 | 2 |

| Res. | Record | Opponent | Method | Event | Date | Round | Time | Location | Notes |
|---|---|---|---|---|---|---|---|---|---|
| Loss | 14–2 | Brian Ebersole | Decision (split) | UFC 140 | December 10, 2011 | 3 | 5:00 | Toronto, Ontario, Canada | |
| Win | 14–1 | Daniel Roberts | Decision (unanimous) | UFC 129 | April 30, 2011 | 3 | 5:00 | Toronto, Ontario, Canada | |
| Win | 13–1 | James Wilks | Decision (unanimous) | UFC 120 | October 16, 2010 | 3 | 5:00 | London, England | |
| Win | 12–1 | Ricardo Funch | Submission (guillotine choke) | UFC 115 | June 12, 2010 | 2 | 1:48 | Vancouver, British Columbia, Canada | |
| Win | 11–1 | Matt MacGrath | Submission (guillotine choke) | AMMA 2: Vengeance | February 5, 2010 | 3 | 2:29 | Edmonton, Alberta, Canada | |
| Win | 10–1 | Daniel Grandmaison | Submission (guillotine choke) | Canadian Fighting Championship 3 | November 13, 2009 | 1 | 2:42 | Winnipeg, Manitoba, Canada | |
| Win | 9–1 | Dave Mazany | TKO (punches) | TFC 6: Domination | March 20, 2009 | 2 | 2:27 | Edmonton, Alberta, Canada | Defended the TFC Canadian MMA Welterweight title. |
| Win | 8–1 | Victor Bachmann | Submission (guillotine choke) | TFC 5: Armageddon | December 5, 2008 | 1 | 4:48 | Edmonton, Alberta, Canada | Won the TFC Canadian MMA Welterweight title. |
| Win | 7–1 | Dan Chambers | Submission (north-south choke) | TFC 3: This Means War | May 31, 2008 | 1 | 0:51 | Edmonton, Alberta, Canada | |
| Win | 6–1 | Ray Steinbeiss | Submission (guillotine choke) | 2006 International Fight League | September 23, 2006 | 1 | 3:12 | Moline, Illinois, United States | |
| Win | 5–1 | Neil Berry | Submission (rear-naked choke) | King of the Cage: Widowmaker | June 18, 2006 | 1 | N/A | Edmonton, Alberta, Canada | |
| Win | 4–1 | Chris Peak | Submission (guillotine choke) | King of the Cage: Karnage | April 22, 2006 | 1 | 1:31 | Calgary, Alberta, Canada | |
| Win | 3–1 | Mandela Kponou | Submission (rear-naked choke) | APEX: Undisputed | September 3, 2005 | 1 | 3:26 | Montreal, Quebec, Canada | |
| Win | 2–1 | Marcus Celestin | TKO (knees) | Ultimate Generation Combat 10 | April 23, 2005 | 1 | 2:55 | Quebec, Canada | |
| Loss | 1–1 | Drew McFedries | Decision (unanimous) | UCC 10: Battle for the Belts 2002 | June 15, 2002 | 3 | 5:00 | Quebec, Canada | |
| Win | 1–0 | Guillaume Desrosiers | TKO (punches) | UCC 8: Fast and Furious | March 30, 2002 | 1 | 2:06 | Rimouski, Quebec, Canada | |

== See also ==
- List of current UFC fighters
- List of male mixed martial artists
- List of Canadian UFC fighters
