= Shefat Isufi =

German Boxer (born 1990)

Personal information
- Nationality: German
- Born: Shefat Isufi; 22 January 1990 (age 36) Veliki Trnovac, SFR Yugoslavia
- Height: 1.80 m (5 ft 11 in)
- Weight: Light-heavyweight; Super middleweight

Boxing career
- Stance: Orthodox

Boxing record
- Total fights: 42
- Wins: 36
- Win by KO: 24
- Losses: 4
- Draws: 2

Shefat Isufi (born 22 January 1990), is a German professional boxer who held the WBF World light-heavyweight title from 16 April 2022. He previously held the WBO Inter-Continental Title in Super Middle Weight from 8 July 2017 to 18 May 2019.

== Background ==
Isufi was born in Veliki Trnovac, Serbia, but in 2010 moved to Munich, Germany to continue his professional boxing career.

== Professional career ==
Isufi made his professional debut on 10 April 2010, went his first 14 fights unbeaten until he lost to fellow German Dennis Ronert, but in his first three fights, two of them were draws.

On 29 December 2015 Isufi won the vacant International Boxing Federation East/West Europe Light heavyweight Title against Slavisa Simeunovic in Regensburg, Germany.

Right after the first title on 7 May 2016, Isufi won the vacant Pan Asian Boxing Association Light heavyweight Title against Giorgi Beroshvili with TKO in round 2 and defended that title again after three months on 20 August 2016 against Mikheil Khutsishvili in Alanya, Turkey.

Isufi started to compete to Super middleweight and on 8 July 2017 he won the vacant World Boxing Organization Inter-Continental Title against David Zegarra with Knockout in round 11. Isufi was able to defend the title twice, on 16 February 2018 against Rafael Sosa Pintos and on 21 July 2018 against Mohamed El Achi, both fights Isufi won with unanimous decision after 10 rounds.

From December 2018 to May 2019, Isufi was listed as a number 1 contender in the world in WBO Super middleweight.

On 18 May 2019, Isufi made his first attempt at a world title, by challenging Billy Joe Saunders for a vacant World Title in Super middleweight who lost with unanimous decision after 12 rounds.

After winning the Interim German International (BDB) Light Heavyweight Title against Bosko Misic with TKO in round 3, Isufi fought Tomasz Adamek for WBF Intercontinental Light Heavyweight Title on 18 July 2021 and won the fight with unanimous decision after 10 rounds.

On 16 April 2022 Isufi won the vacant WBF World title when he out-scored Bulgarian Grigor Saruhanian after 12 rounds with unanimous decision. Isufi is still the WBF World Light Heavyweight champion after retaining his title against Canadian Ryan Ford, and after a close and entertaining encounter he emerged victorious by unanimous decision on 16 September 2022 at the Rudolf Weber Arena in Oberhausen, Germany.

== Accomplishments ==
- International Boxing Federation Youth Cruiser Champion 2014
- International Boxing Federation East/West Europe Light Heavyweight Champion 2015, 2016
- Pan Asian Boxing Association Light Heavyweight Champion 2016
- World Boxing Organization Inter-Continental Super Middleweight Champion 2017, 2018
- Interim German International (BDB) Light Heavy Title 2020
- World Boxing Federation Inter-Continental Light Heavyweight Champion 2021
- World Boxing Federation World Light Heavyweight Champion 2022

== Professional boxing record ==
42 fights	36 wins	4 losses
By knockout	24	1
By decision	12	3
Draws	2	

No.	Result	Record	Opponent	Type	Round	Date	Location	Notes
42	Win	36-4-2	Ryan Ford	UD	12	16 Sep 2022	Rudolf Weber-Arena, Oberhausen, Germany	Defended WBF World Light Heavyweight Title
41	Win	35-4-2	Bernard Donfack	UD	8	2 July 2022	Pyramide Mainz, Mainz, Rheinland-Pfalz, Germany	
40	Win	34-4-2	Grigor Saruhanian	UD	12	16 Apr 2022	Ballhaus Forum, Unterschleißheim, Germany	Won vacant WBF World Light Heavyweight Title
39	Win	33-4-2	Slavisa Simeunovic	RTD	2 (6), 3:00	30 Jan 2022	Boxclub Home of Champions-Ka, Eggenstein-Leopoldshafen, Germany	
38	Win	32-4-2	Tomasz Adamek	UD	10	04 Sep 2021	Hansehalle, Lübeck, Germany	Won World Boxing Federation Intercontinental Light Heavyweight Title
37	Win	31-4-2	Ericles Torres Marin	KO	2 (8), 1:44	21 May 2021	Hyatt Regency Hotel, Belgrade, Serbia	
36	Win	30-4-2	Bosko Misic	TKO	3	18 Jul 2020	Vitis Event Sportcenter, Wiesbaden, Germany	Won Interim German International (BDB) Light Heavyweight Title
35	Win	29-4-2	Nicolas Holcapfel	TKO	4	26 Dec 2019	Kursaal, Berne, Switzerland	
34	Win	28-4-2	Levan Shonia	UD	6	08 Nov 2019	Bergisch Gladbach, Germany	
33	Loss	27-4-2	Billy Joe Saunders	UD	12	18 May 2019	Lamex Stadium, Stevenage, UK	vacant World Boxing Organisation World Super Middleweight Title
32	Win	27-3-2	Mohamed El Achi	UD	12	21 Jul 2018	Munich, Germany	Won World Boxing Organisation Inter-Continental Super Middleweight Title
31	Win	26-3-2	Rafael Sosa Pintos	UD	10	16 Feb 2018	Sporthall Budakalász, Budakalász, Hungary	Won World Boxing Organisation Inter-Continental Super Middleweight Title
30	Win	25-3-2	Badri Kereselidze	TKO	1	15 Dec 2017	Lake Side Hotel, Szekesfehervar, Hungary	
29	Win	24-3-2	David Zegarra	KO	11	08 Jul 2017	LEO's Boxgym, Munich, Germany	Won vacant World Boxing Organisation Inter-Continental Super Middleweight Title
28	Win	23-3-2	Soso Abuladze	TKO	4	29 Apr 2017	Unterschleißheim, Germany	
27	Win	22-3-2	Daniel Urbanski	KO	3	19 Nov 2016	Tui Arena, Hannover, Germany	
26	Win	21-3-2	Mikheil Khutsishvili	RTD	8	20 Aug 2016	Wikingen Beach Resort, Alanya, Turkey	Won PABA Light Heavyweight Title
25	Win	20-3-2	Giorgi Beroshvili	TKO	2	7 May 2016	Planegg, Germany	Won vacant PABA Light Heavyweight Title
24	Win	19-3-2	Slavisa Simeunovic	TKO	3	29 Dec 2015	Antoniushaus, Regensburg, Germany	Won vacant International Boxing Federation East/West Europe Light Heavyweight Title
23	Win	18-3-2	Paata Aduashvili	UD	6	12 Dec 2015	Schützen- und Bürgerhaus, Hoevelhof, Germany	
22	Loss	17-3-2	Dariusz Sek	RTD	8	04 Jul 2015	Circus Krone, Munich, Germany	
21	Win	17-2-2	Achilles Szabo	TKO	5	2 May 2015	ASV Halle, Dachau, Germany	
20	Win	16-2-2	Istvan Zeller	TKO	3	28 Mar 2015	Dreifachsporthalle, Altoetting, Germany	
19	Win	15-2-2	Ata Dogan	TKO	4	24 Jan 2015	ASV Halle, Dachau, Germany	
18	Win	14-2-2	Allou Diallo Ali	KO	2	18 Oct 2014	ASV Halle, Dachau, Germany	
17	Win	13-2-2	Dejan Krneta	TKO	6	07 Jun 2014	ASV Halle, Dachau, Germany	
16	Loss	12-2-2	Tasos Berdesis	UD	6	15 Mar 2014	Olympic Center Palation Faliron, Athens, Greece	
15	Loss	12-1-2	Dennis Ronert	UD	10	01 Mar 2014	GETEC Arena, Magdeburg, Germany	International Boxing Federation Youth Cruiser Title
14	Win	12-0-2	Vasile Dragomir	RTD	4	01 Nov 2013	ASV Halle, Dachau, Germany	
13	Win	11-0-2	Ognjen Zekanovic	TKO	3	29 Jun 2013	Dachau, Germany	
12	Win	10-0-2	Emil Markic	TKO	4	23 Mar 2013	Merkur Arena Luebbecke, Luebbecke, Germany	
11	Win	9-0-2	Nersad Malicevic	RTD	3	16 Mar 2013	Qendra Sportive Rinia, Bujanovac, Serbia	
10	Win	8-0-2	Mesud Selimovic	UD	4	10 Nov 2012	Impact Gym, Munich, Germany	
9	Win	7-0-2	Valeri Qade	MD	4	21 Apr 2012	Hotel Marsoel, Chur, Switzerland	
8	Win	6-0-2	Mesud Selimovic	PTS	4	03 Mar 2012	Impact Gym, Munich, Germany	
7	Win	5-0-2	Fred Lemare	TKO	2	12 Nov 2011	Impact Gym, Munich, Germany	
6	Win	4-0-2	Mutlu Aksu	TKO	1	14 Oct 2011	Mehrzweckhalle, Obertraubling, Germany	
5	Win	3-0-2	Jameil Bleind	TKO	4	20 May 2011	Zenith - Die Kulturhalle, Munich, Germany	
4	Win	2-0-2	Nenad Kovac	TKO	1	7 May 2011	Impact Gym, Munich, Germany	
3	Draw	1-0-2	Tani Dima	PTS	6	20 Jun 2010	Gmund am Tegernsee, Germany	
2	Win	1-0-1	Richard Herzog	PTS	4	13 May 2010	Festzelt Trudering, Munich, Germany	
1	Draw	0-0-1	Ali Chakiev	MD	4	10 Apr 2010	Gaswerk, Augsburg, Germany	
