= World Series of Fighting Canada 1: Ford vs. Powell =

World Series of Fighting MMA event in 2014

- Promotion: World Series of Fighting: Canada
- Date: February 21, 2014
- Venue: Edmonton Expo Centre
- City: Edmonton, Alberta, Canada
- Attendance: 2,100

Event chronology
WSOF 8: Gaethje vs. Patishnock	World Series of Fighting Canada 1: Ford vs. Powell	WSOF 9: Carl vs. Palhares

World Series of Fighting Canada 1: Ford vs. Powell was a mixed martial arts event held February 21, 2014 in Edmonton, Alberta, Canada.

== Background ==
Headlining the card is top Canadian welterweight prospect Ryan "The Real Deal" Ford taking on Joel Powell for the inaugural WSOF Canadian welterweight champion. Undefeated heavyweight Steve Mocco takes on Smealinho Rama in the co-main event.

Ultimate Fighter alum Michael Hill takes on Ryan Dickson. Former UFC vet Tim Hague is featured to be on the undercard taking on Lee Mein, the father of current UFC Welterweight fighter Jordan Mein.

== Results ==
Main Card (NBC Sports)
Weight class				Method	Round	Time	Notes
Welterweight	Ryan Ford	def.	Joel Powell	KO (front kick and punch)	1	0:53	(Note: For the inaugural WSOF Canadian Welterweight Championship)
Heavyweight	Smealinho Rama	def.	Steve Mocco	Decision (unanimous) (29–27, 30–27, 29–28)	3	5:00
Welterweight	Michael Hill	def.	Ryan Dickson	Decision (unanimous) (29–28, 29–28, 29–28)	3	5:00
Featherweight	Josh Machan	def.	Adam Lorenz	Decision (split) (29–28, 28–29, 29–28)	3	5:00
Welterweight	Brandt Dewsbery	def.	Mark Drummond	Submission (rear-naked choke)	1	4:31
Preliminary card
Featherweight	Lenny Wheeler	vs.	Will Romero	No Contest (accidental punches to back of head)	1	4:47	(Note: Bout ruled a No Contest due to unintentional illegal blows to back of the head of Wheeler.)
Light Heavyweight	Mike Kent	def.	Matt Baker	Decision (split) (29–28, 28–29, 29-28)	3	5:00
Heavyweight	Tim Hague	def.	Lee Mein	TKO (punches)	1	4:21
Bantamweight	Owen Carr	def.	Maged Hammo	Decision (unanimous) (30–27, 30–27, 30–27)	3	5:00
Featherweight	Hakeem Dawodu	def.	Behrang Yousefi	KO (punch)	1	1:07
Lightweight	Roger Alves	def.	Jemark Brady	Decision (unanimous) (30–27, 30–26, 30–25)	3	5:00
Welterweight	Stuart Fontaine	def.	Justin Evans	TKO (punches)	1	2:11

== Bonus awards ==
The following fighters were awarded fight night bonuses:

- Fight of The Night: Ryan Dickson vs Michael Hill
- Knockout of The Night: Ryan Ford
- Submission of the Night: Brandt Dewsbery

== See also ==
- World Series of Fighting
- List of WSOF champions
- List of WSOF events
