= Broadhall Way =

Football stadium

Coordinates: 51°53′23″N 0°11′37″W

SPORTA Arena
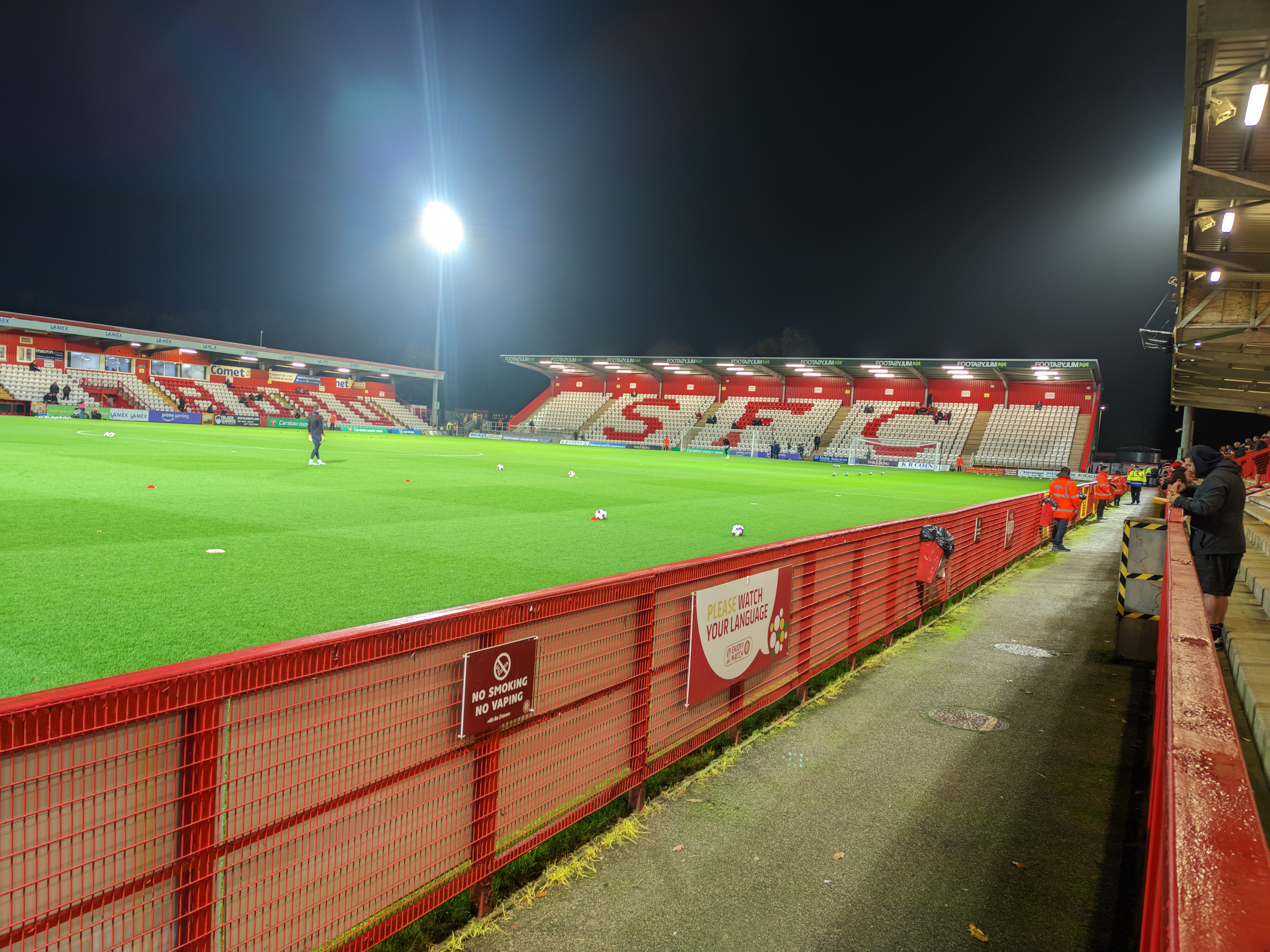
- Interactive map of SPORTA Arena
- Full name: SPORTA Arena
- Location: Stevenage, Hertfordshire
- Owner: Stevenage F.C.
- Operator: Stevenage F.C.
- Capacity: 7,318
- Surface: Hybrid grass
- Record attendance: 8,040
- Field size: 110 x 70 yards

Construction
- Built: 1960
- Opened: 1961
- Renovated: 2001
- Expanded: 2019

Tenants
- Stevenage Town F.C. (1961–1968); Stevenage Athletic F.C. (1968–1976); Stevenage F.C. (1980–present)

Broadhall Way, known as the SPORTA Arena for sponsorship reasons, is a football stadium located in Stevenage, Hertfordshire, England. Built in 1960 and opened the following year, it has been the home ground of Stevenage Football Club, formerly Stevenage Borough, since 1980.

The stadium was previously occupied by Stevenage's former clubs: initially Stevenage Town from 1961 to 1968 and then Stevenage Athletic from 1968 to 1976. It has a capacity of 7,318, with a record attendance of 8,040 set during an FA Cup fourth-round tie against Newcastle United in 1998, when a temporary stand was erected to accommodate additional spectators. Broadhall Way was constructed on the site of a former sewage works and initially featured stands relocated from the club's previous ground. Following Stevenage Borough's tenancy, the stadium underwent incremental improvements. After winning the Football Conference in 1995–96, Stevenage were denied promotion to the Football League due to inadequate facilities and insufficient capacity, prompting further redevelopment in the late 1990s and early 2000s. Promotion to the Football League was eventually achieved in 2010, following the club's Conference Premier title in 2009–10. The North Stand, completed in 2019, increased capacity and modernised facilities.

== History ==
=== Stevenage Town ===
In 1960, the Stevenage Development Corporation constructed Broadhall Way, financed through contributions of £12,000 from the Corporation, £4,000 from Stevenage Town, and £1,000 from the Football Association. The site, formerly occupied by a sewage works, hosted its first fixture on 26 August 1961, when Stevenage Town played Ware in a Delphian League match. In its early years, the ground utilised stands relocated from the club's former London Road stadium, which had been its home since 1900, before permanent stands were erected on both the east and west sides. The pitch was of particularly poor quality, consisting largely of mud and stones. Floodlights were installed in 1964, but few other improvements were made before the club folded in 1968.

=== Stevenage Athletic ===
The stadium subsequently became home to Stevenage Athletic, who played there from 1968 until their bankruptcy in 1976. Broadhall Way then remained unused for three years. In November 1976, the newly founded Stevenage Borough attempted to stage their first fixture at the ground, against Hitchin Town Youth, but the match was abandoned after Javier Revuelta, the former chairman of Stevenage Athletic and holder of the lease, had a trench dug across the pitch.

=== Stevenage ===
The Stevenage Borough Council repurchased the stadium in 1980 and installed Stevenage Borough F.C. as tenants. The club's first competitive match at the ground took place on 16 August 1980, a 3–1 victory over ON Chenecks in the United Counties League, attended by 421 spectators. The stadium remained largely unchanged during the 1980s, but in 1994 underwent renovations, including the construction of a terrace and a 460-seat West Stand, following three promotions in four seasons. Stevenage were denied promotion to the Football League after winning the Football Conference in 1995–96 due to insufficient capacity and inadequate facilities. Subsequent redevelopment in the late 1990s and early 2000s included the construction of a £600,000 South Stand incorporating an executive suite.

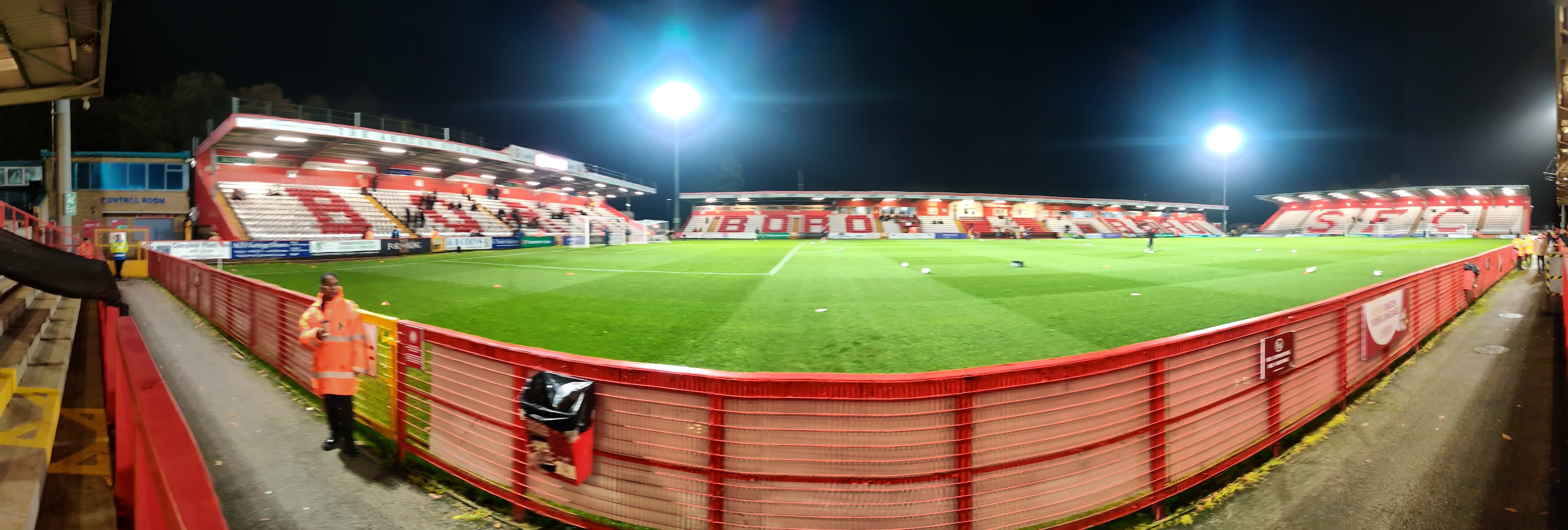
Panorama view from the East Terrace

In January 2009, the club agreed a six-figure sponsorship deal with the Lamex Food Group, leading to the renaming of Broadhall Way to the Lamex Stadium. Following promotion as Conference Premier champions in 2009–10, the club dropped the word 'Borough' from its name, and the stadium hosted Football League matches for the first time in the 2010–11 season. Capacity stood at 6,722, including 3,142 seats (reduced from 7,100 following promotion), until the North Stand was completed in December 2019, raising capacity to 7,318. The naming rights agreement with Lamex Food Group expired in October 2025 when club chairman Phil Wallace retired from the company. The ground was subsequently known as the Stevenage F.C. Stadium until August 2026, when the club agreed a 10-year naming rights deal with SPORTA, a financial services company, and renamed it SPORTA Arena.

== Structure and facilities ==
=== West Stand ===
The stadium comprises four stands: the East Terrace, the North Stand, the West Stand, and the South Stand. The first grandstand on the west side was built in 1964 following Stevenage Town's entry into the Southern League. It was a propped, cantilevered structure with six steps of terracing at the front and an elevated seating area for 440 spectators. This was replaced in 1994 by a 460-capacity all-seater stand, which was extended to cover the full length of the pitch after Stevenage won the Conference Premier title in 1996, increasing the stand's capacity to 1,800. This extended structure forms the present West Stand. The West Stand is a covered all-seater stand, with open corners on either side. At its rear are glass-fronted club offices and executive boxes, while the club shop is located adjacent to the stand, opposite the official car park.

Stand	Capacity
West Stand	1,800
East Terrace	2,700
North Stand	1,428
South Stand	1,390

=== East Terrace ===
When the ground was first built, a cantilevered East Stand was constructed at a cost of £2,500. It seated 230 spectators on benches and was built in brick with an asbestos roof. On either side of the stand were covered sections relocated from the club's former London Road ground, each with a few steps of terracing beneath. These were later replaced by small, uncovered terraces. The original East Stand remained in place until 1996, when it was demolished and replaced by the East Terrace, which runs the full length of the pitch. A roof was added in 1998. The East Terrace has an approximate capacity of 2,700, designated for home supporters. It features a central gable with a clock above the halfway line, and supports a television gantry on its roof.

=== North Stand ===
At the time of the ground's opening, the north end accommodated a clubhouse and changing rooms, with several rows of terracing provided for spectators. A permanent terrace was constructed in 1994, featuring seven steps and a partially covered structure; three-quarters of the terrace was roofed, while the remainder was uncovered. With a capacity of 700, it also provided facilities for disabled supporters. In January 2013, the club announced plans for a new £1.2 million, 1,700-seat stand to replace the North Terrace, though the project was delayed due to "numerous obstacles". To help fund the redevelopment, the club launched a mini-bond scheme through the sports investment platform Tifosy in July 2017, raising over £500,000 from more than 200 supporters within five weeks, with a further £100,000 contributed shortly afterwards.

The North Terrace was demolished in January 2018. Construction of the replacement stand was temporarily halted in June 2018 after UK Power Networks refused permission to build around an existing substation, but resumed in February 2019 following the installation of a new one. The 1,428-seat, all-seater North Stand was officially opened in December 2019. The stand includes a bar and lounge, named The 76 Lounge in reference to the club's formation in 1976, which is available to both home and away supporters on matchdays.

=== South Stand ===
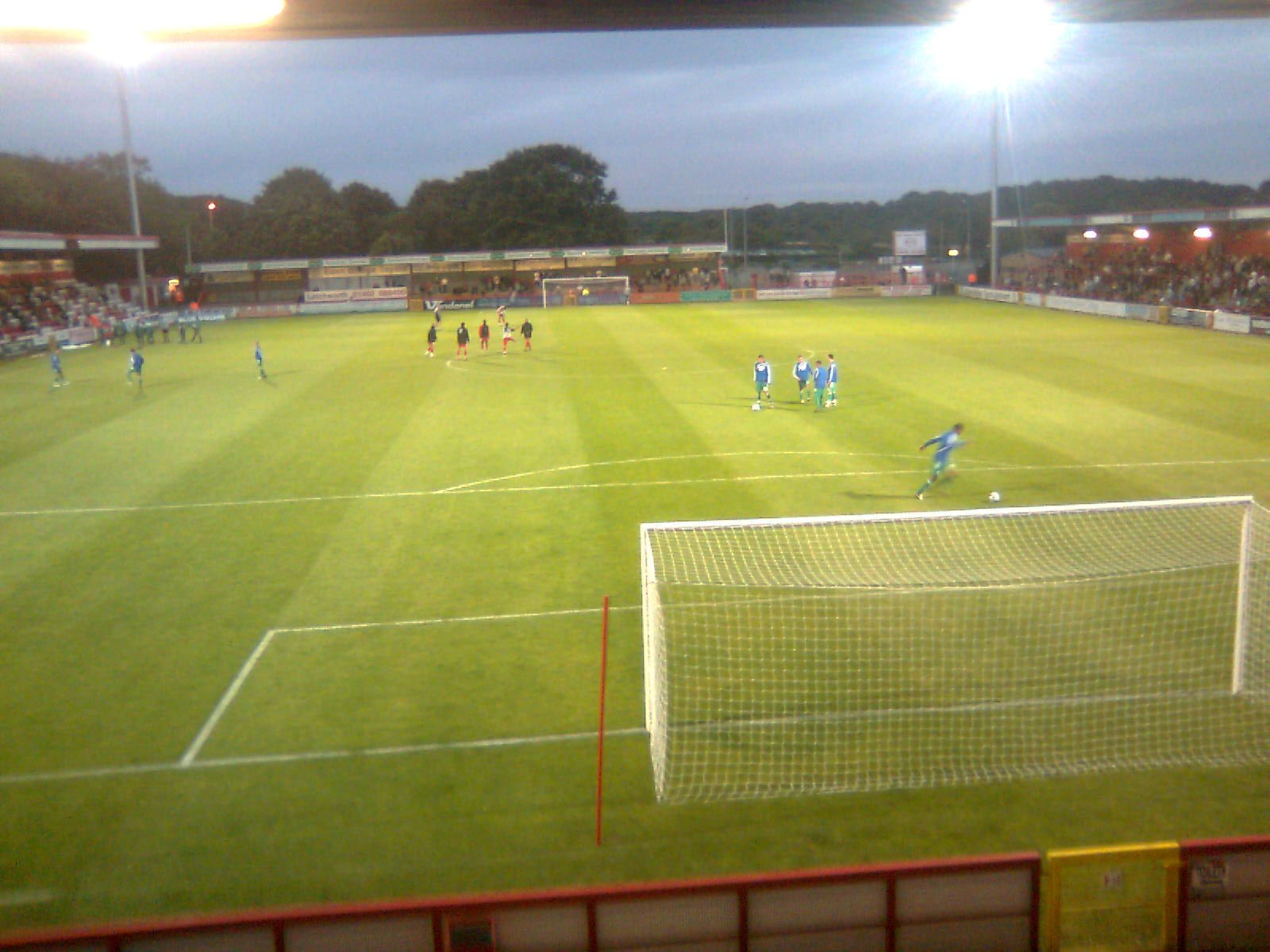
View from the South Stand prior to the 2019 renovation

Until the 1990s, the southern end of Broadhall Way consisted of a grass bank. In 1994, a small terraced stand was erected, mirroring the design of the North Terrace with a covered central section and uncovered sides; the roof was removed two years later. A replacement all-seater structure was constructed in 2001 at a cost of £600,000 and brought into use during the 2001–02 season. Designated for away supporters, the single-tiered, covered stand has a capacity of 1,390. An electronic scoreboard, originally installed in 2001 and replaced in 2011, is mounted at the centre of the roof for visibility to home spectators. The supporters' club is situated directly behind the stand, while a new set of floodlights was installed in advance of the 2007–08 season.

=== Training facilities ===
A £5 million training facility at Shephalbury Park was announced and subsequently opened in autumn 2002. In June 2011, the club acquired a 42-acre former sports ground at Bragbury End for the development of a new training complex. Construction began that summer, with club staff commencing use of the facility during the latter stages of the 2012–13 season. Since the opening of Bragbury End, Shephalbury Park has been used by the club's academy.

== Other uses ==
The stadium hosted its first international fixture on 1 March 2001, when the England under-19 team drew 1–1 with the Netherlands in front of 1,616 spectators. Over the following two years, it also staged England under-17, England under-20, and England National Game XI fixtures. In July 2012, it was the venue for a warm-up match for the 2012 Summer Olympics between the Senegal and South Korea under-23 teams. The ground served as the home venue for the Tottenham Hotspur reserve team in 2002, and since September 2014 has regularly hosted a number of Tottenham under-21 fixtures each season.

Broadhall Way was the neutral venue for the Conference South play-off finals in 2006, 2007, and 2008. Beyond professional football, it has staged a range of sporting and community events, including charity matches. It hosted a professional boxing event on 18 May 2019, in which Billy Joe Saunders defeated Shefat Isufi to win the WBO super-middleweight title. In May 2025, the stadium staged SMR 25, a three-day music festival.

Other matches hosted at Broadhall Way
Date	Home team	Result	Away team	Competition	Attendance	Ref
1 March 2001	England U19	1–1	Netherlands U19	Friendly	1,616	
13 February 2002	England U17	2–2	Slovakia U17	Friendly	—	
20 March 2003	England National Game XI	2–1	United States XI	Friendly	548	
9 October 2003	England U20	2–0	Czech Republic U20	Friendly	5,000	
7 May 2006	St Albans City	2–0	Histon	Conference South play-off final	3,175	
13 May 2007	Salisbury City	1–0	Braintree Town	Conference South play-off final	3,167	
8 May 2008	Eastbourne Borough	2–0	Hampton & Richmond Borough	Conference South play-off final	—	
20 July 2012	South Korea U23	3–0	Senegal U23	Friendly	—	
25 February 2025	England U23 women	1–0	France U23 women	Friendly	2,809	

== Records ==
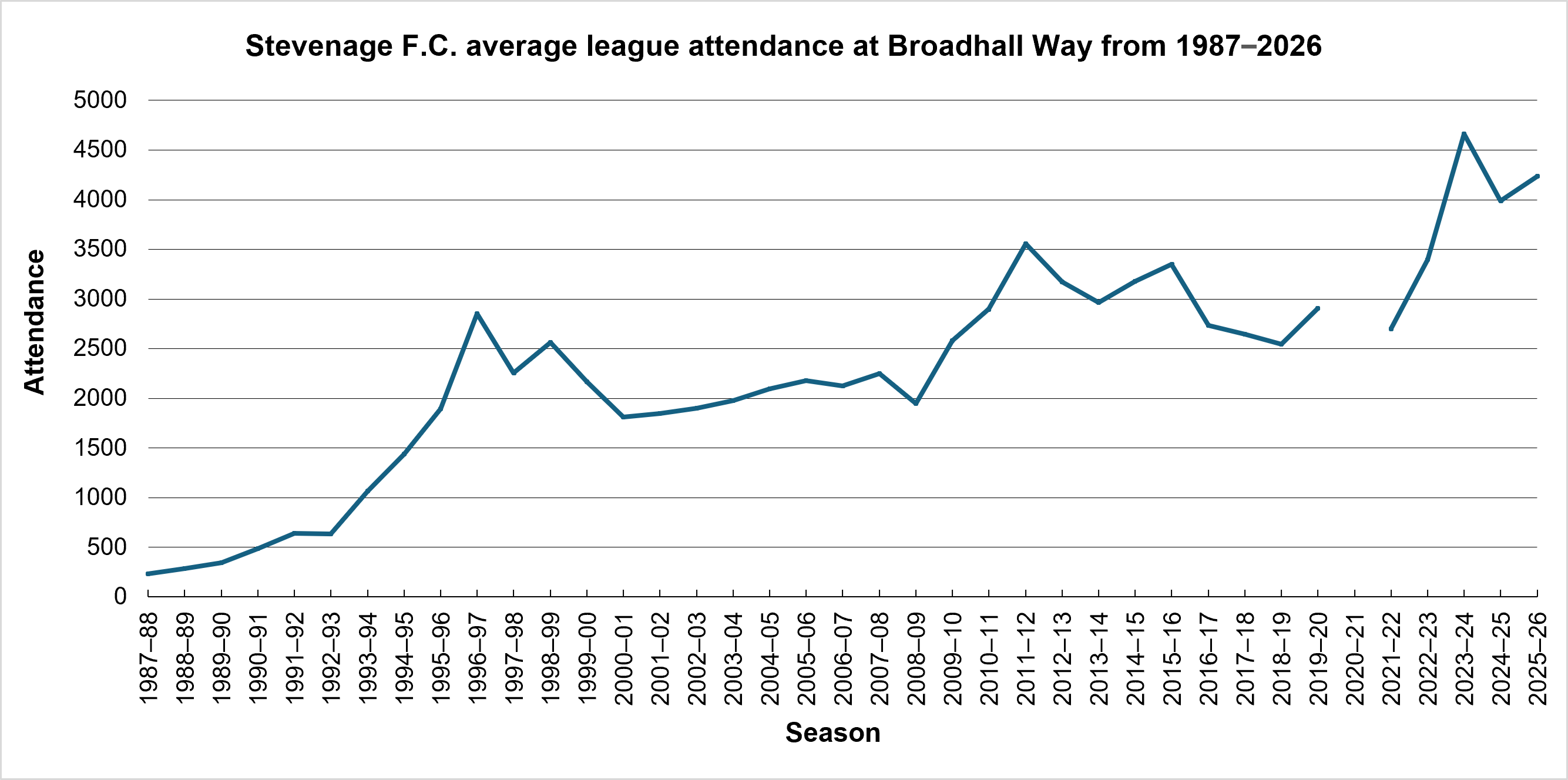
Stevenage's average league attendance at Broadhall Way since 1987.

The highest attendance recorded at Broadhall Way was 8,040 for a match against Newcastle United in the FA Cup fourth round on 25 January 1998. A temporary stand was erected by the club to increase the stadium capacity to 8,100 in order to meet the Football Association's requirements. The record league attendance is 7,228, set during a EFL League One fixture against Luton Town on 4 October 2025. The club's lowest attendance while competing in the highest tier of non-League football was 879 for a match against Stalybridge Celtic on 18 March 1995. The lowest overall attendance for a first-team fixture was 152 for an Isthmian League match against Billericay Town on 31 August 1987.

Since Stevenage's promotion to the Football Conference in 1994, average attendances at Broadhall Way have demonstrated a steady overall increase. The club's first season in the Football League produced an average attendance of 2,897, surpassing the previous high of 2,855 set during the 1996–97 season. This figure rose significantly in the following season, with an average of 3,559 recorded during the club's first season in League One, marking both the first time the club averaged over 3,000 and exceeding a cumulative home attendance of 100,000 across the season. Attendances fluctuated during subsequent years, correlating with changes in league position and division. Following the COVID-19 pandemic, which prevented supporters from attending matches in the 2020–21 season, figures began to rise again. A new record seasonal average was established in the club's 2023–24 season, with 4,660 spectators attending League One fixtures on average. Although this slightly declined to 3,989 during the 2024–25 season, it remained well above historical averages. The club's lowest average attendance during their time in the top five tiers of English football was recorded in the 1994–95 season, their first in the Conference, with an average of 1,440.

== Transport ==
The ground is located just over a mile away from Stevenage railway station, which is adjacent to the town centre; the station lies on the East Coast Main Line north of King's Cross station. A shuttle bus service operates on matchdays between the station, town centre, and the stadium. Parking for around 500 vehicles is available opposite the ground free of charge.
