= World Series of Fighting: Central America =

MMA promoter based in Nicaragua

World Series of Fighting (Central America)
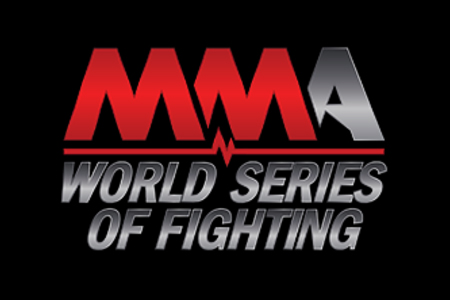
- Type: Private
- Industry: Mixed martial arts promotion
- Founded: 2013
- Headquarters: Managua, Nicaragua
- Key people: Ray Sefo (President)
- Website: http://centam.wsof.com/

World Series of Fighting (Central America) formerly Omega MMA is a Nicaraguan Mixed Martial Arts promotion based out of Managua, Nicaragua. The promotion made its debut on May 3, 2013. In the Summer of 2013, Omega MMA was quietly purchased by WSOF, and was rebranded as World Series of Fighting: Central America. The promotion held its first event on July 27, 2013, headlined by former boxing world champion Ricardo Mayorga.

== Rules ==
WSOF employs the Unified Rules of Mixed Martial Arts as Fighters compete in a cage.

=== Rounds ===
Every round in WSOF competition is contested with a five-minute time limit. Championship bouts are contested with five, five-minute rounds, and non-title bouts are contested with three, five-minute rounds. There is a one-minute rest period in between rounds.

=== Match outcome ===
Matches usually end via:

- Submission: a fighter clearly taps on the mat or his opponent or verbally submits.
- Technical Submission: A technical submission is achieved when the referee stops a fight due to an injury resulting from a submission hold or due to a fighter going unconscious from a choke.
- Knockout: a fighter falls from a legal blow and is either unconscious or unable to immediately continue.
- Technical Knockout (TKO): If a fighter cannot continue, the fight is ended as a technical knockout. Technical knockouts can be classified into three categories:
  - referee stoppage: (the referee determines a fighter cannot "intelligently defend" himself; if warnings to the fighter to improve his position or defense go unanswered—generally, two warnings are given, about 5 seconds apart)
  - doctor stoppage (a ringside doctor due to injury or impending injury, as when blood flows into the eyes and blinds a fighter)
  - corner stoppage (a fighter's own corner-man signals defeat for their own fighter)
- Judges' Decision: Depending on scoring, a match may end as:
  - unanimous decision (all three judges score a win for fighter A)
  - majority decision (two judges score a win for fighter A, one judge scores a draw)
  - split decision (two judges score a win for fighter A, one judge scores a win for fighter B)
  - unanimous draw (all three judges score a draw)
  - majority draw (two judges score a draw, one judge scoring a win)
  - split draw (one judge scores a win for fighter A, one judge scores a win for fighter B, and one judge scores a draw)

Note: In the event of a draw, it is not necessary that the fighters' total points be equal. However, in a unanimous or split draw, each fighter does score an equal number of win judgments from the three judges (0 or 1, respectively).

A fight can also end in a technical decision, disqualification, forfeit, technical draw, or no contest. The latter two outcomes have no winners.

== Current Champions ==
Division	Upper weight limit	Champion	Since	Title Defenses
Heavyweight	265 lb (120 kg; 18.9 st)			
Light Heavyweight	205 lb (93 kg; 14.6 st)			
Middleweight	185 lb (84 kg; 13.2 st)			
Welterweight	170 lb (77 kg; 12 st)			
Lightweight	155 lb (70 kg; 11.1 st)			
Featherweight	145 lb (66 kg; 10.4 st)			
Bantamweight	135 lb (61 kg; 9.6 st)			

== Title history ==
=== Heavyweight Championship ===
206 to 265 lbs (93 to 120 kg)

No.	Name	Event	Date	Defenses
1	N/A	N/A	N/A	

=== Light Heavyweight Championship ===
186 to 205 lbs (84 to 93 kg)

No.	Name	Event	Date	Defenses
1	N/A	N/A	N/A	

=== Middleweight Championship ===
171 to 185 lbs (77 to 84 kg)

No.	Name	Event	Date	Defenses
1	N/A	N/A	N/A	

=== Welterweight Championship ===
156 to 170 lbs (70 to 77 kg)

No.	Name	Event	Date	Defenses
1	N/A	N/A	N/A	

=== Lightweight Championship ===
146 to 155 lbs (66 to 70 kg)

No.	Name	Event	Date	Defenses
1	N/A	N/A	N/A	

=== Featherweight Championship ===
136 to 145 lbs (61 to 66 kg)

No.	Name	Event	Date	Defenses
1	N/A	N/A	N/A	

=== Bantamweight Championship ===
126 to 135 lbs (up to 61 kg)

No.	Name	Event	Date	Defenses
1	N/A	N/A	N/A	

== See also ==
- World Series of Fighting
- World Series of Fighting: Canada
