= Fish-hooking =

Inserting one's fingers into another's mouth or nostrils and pulling away

- Illustration of a man being fish-hooked
- Style: Self-defense
- Parent hold: Headlock, Chokeholds
- Attacks: Mouth, Nostril, or other facial orifices
- Counters: Biting of the applicable finger(s)

Fish-hooking is the act of inserting a finger or fingers of one or both hands into the mouth, nostrils or other orifices of a person, and pulling away from the centerline of the body; in most cases with the intention of pulling, tearing, or lacerating the surrounding tissue. Forceful fish-hooking involves a high risk of permanent facial or orifice damage. Sometimes, the term fish hooking refers to a type of eye gouging.

Fish-hooking techniques are disallowed in modern combat sports, mixed martial arts and martial arts competitions due to the risk of permanent injury. This technique is, however, occasionally taught as part of self-defense curricula in some martial arts such as Krav Maga and Gōjū-ryū karate, and used to be part of catch wrestling as well.

== See also ==
- Pain compliance
- Self-defense
- Combatives
