= Boxing at the 2015 Pan American Games =

- Boxing pictogram for the games
- Venue: Oshawa Sports Centre
- Dates: July 18–25
- No. of events: 13 (10 men, 3 women)
- Competitors: 120 from 24 nations

Boxing competitions at the 2015 Pan American Games in Toronto were held from July 18 to 25 at the General Motors Centre (Oshawa Sports Centre) in Oshawa. Due to naming rights the arena was known as the latter for the duration of the games. A total of thirteen boxing events will be held: ten for men and three for women.

== Venue ==
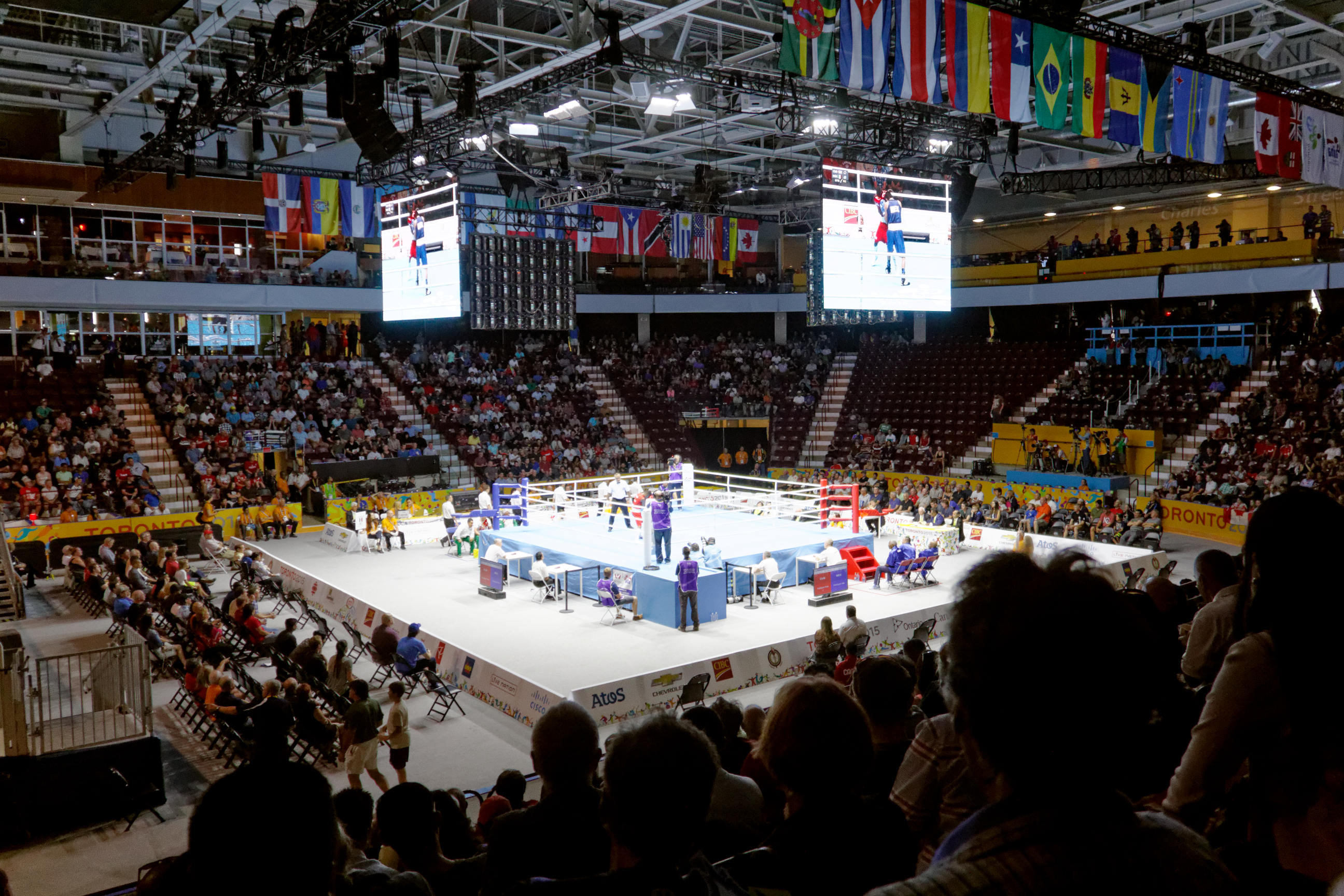
The General Motors Centre (Oshawa Sports Centre), in Oshawa, was the venue for the boxing competitions

The competitions will take place at the General Motors Centre (Oshawa Sports Centre) located about in the city of Oshawa, about 60 kilometers from the athletes village. The arena will have a reduced capacity (from its normal of about 5,500) of about 3,000 people per session. The venue will also host weightlifting competitions earlier during the games.

== New rules ==
To harmonise with the rules of amateur boxing decided by the Association Internationale de Boxe Amateur (AIBA), Pan Am Boxing will feature new rules. There will be an introduction of the "10-point must" scoring system used in the pro game, where the winner of each round must be awarded 10 points and the loser a lesser amount, and the elimination of the padded headgear. AIBA new rules want to take away the focus on the head as the key scoring location. The AIBA, boxing's world body, said removing the headgear would actually make things safer by reducing concussions, and the jury is out on that. Now, the boxer will have to concentrate on the whole body and proper ring tactics. The International Olympic Committee has not as yet decided whether to permit boxing without headgear for Rio in 2016. How thing go in Toronto this year may go a long way to a final decision. AIBA officials are also waiting to see how things go in the men's game before making a decision to take headgear off women fighters.

== Competition schedule ==
The following is the competition schedule for the boxing competitions:

P	Preliminaries	¼	Quarterfinals	½	Semifinals	F	Final

Event↓/Date →	Sat 18	Sun 19	Mon 20	Tue 21	Wed 22	Thu 23	Fri 24	Sat 25
Men's light flyweight	P		¼		½		F	
Men's flyweight		P		¼		½		F
Men's bantamweight	P		¼		½		F	
Men's lightweight		P		¼		½		F
Men's light welterweight	P			¼	½		F	
Men's welterweight		P		¼		½		F
Men's middleweight	P		¼		½		F	
Men's light heavyweight		P		¼		½		F
Men's heavyweight	¼				½		F	
Men's super heavyweight		¼				½		F
Women's flyweight			¼	½				F
Women's lightweight			¼	½				F
Women's light heavyweight			¼	½			F	

== Medal table ==
* Host nation (Canada)

Rank	Nation	Gold	Silver	Bronze	Total
1	Cuba	6	4	0	10
2	Canada*	3	0	3	6
3	United States	2	1	2	5
4	Venezuela	1	2	3	6
5	Mexico	1	1	3	5
6	Colombia	0	2	3	5
6	Dominican Republic	0	2	3	5
8	Argentina	0	1	2	3
9	Brazil	0	0	2	2
9	Puerto Rico	0	0	2	2
11	Chile	0	0	1	1
11	Costa Rica	0	0	1	1
11	Guatemala	0	0	1	1
Totals (13 entries)		13	13	26	52

== Medalists ==
=== Men's events ===
Event	Gold	Silver	Bronze
Light flyweight	Joselito Velázquez; Mexico	Joahnys Argilagos; Cuba	Yoel Finol Rivas; Venezuela
Light flyweight	Joselito Velázquez; Mexico	Joahnys Argilagos; Cuba	Victor Santillan; Dominican Republic
Flyweight	Antonio Vargas; United States	Yosvany Veitía; Cuba	Ceiber Ávila; Colombia
Flyweight	Antonio Vargas; United States	Yosvany Veitía; Cuba	David Jimenez; Costa Rica
Bantamweight	Andy Cruz Gómez; Cuba	Héctor García; Dominican Republic	Kenny Lally; Canada
Bantamweight	Andy Cruz Gómez; Cuba	Héctor García; Dominican Republic	Francisco Martinez; United States
Lightweight	Lázaro Álvarez; Cuba	Lindolfo Delgado; Mexico	Kevin Luna; Guatemala
Lightweight	Lázaro Álvarez; Cuba	Lindolfo Delgado; Mexico	José Rosario; Puerto Rico
Light welterweight	Arthur Biyarslanov; Canada	Yasniel Toledo; Cuba	Joedison Teixeira; Brazil
Light welterweight	Arthur Biyarslanov; Canada	Yasniel Toledo; Cuba	Luis Arcon; Venezuela
Welterweight	Gabriel Maestre; Venezuela	Roniel Iglesias; Cuba	Juan Ramón Solano; Dominican Republic
Welterweight	Gabriel Maestre; Venezuela	Roniel Iglesias; Cuba	Alberto Palmetta; Argentina
Middleweight	Arlen López; Cuba	Jorge Vivas; Colombia	Misael Rodríguez; Mexico
Middleweight	Arlen López; Cuba	Jorge Vivas; Colombia	Endry Saavedra; Venezuela
Light heavyweight	Julio César la Cruz; Cuba	Albert Ramirez Duran; Venezuela	Juan Carlos Carrillo; Colombia
Light heavyweight	Julio César la Cruz; Cuba	Albert Ramirez Duran; Venezuela	Rogelio Romero; Mexico
Heavyweight	Erislandy Savón; Cuba	Deivi Julio; Colombia	Samir El-Mais; Canada
Heavyweight	Erislandy Savón; Cuba	Deivi Julio; Colombia	Miguel Veliz; Chile
Super heavyweight	Lenier Pero; Cuba	Edgar Muñoz; Venezuela	Cam Awesome; United States
Super heavyweight	Lenier Pero; Cuba	Edgar Muñoz; Venezuela	Rafael Lima; Brazil

=== Women's events ===
Event	Gold	Silver	Bronze
Flyweight	Mandy Bujold; Canada	Marlen Esparza; United States	Monica Gonzalez Rivera; Puerto Rico
Flyweight	Mandy Bujold; Canada	Marlen Esparza; United States	Ingrit Valencia; Colombia
Lightweight	Caroline Veyre; Canada	Dayana Sánchez; Argentina	Victoria Torres; Mexico
Lightweight	Caroline Veyre; Canada	Dayana Sánchez; Argentina	Mirquin Sena; Dominican Republic
Light heavyweight	Claressa Shields; United States	Yenebier Guillén; Dominican Republic	Ariane Fortin; Canada
Light heavyweight	Claressa Shields; United States	Yenebier Guillén; Dominican Republic	Lucía Pérez; Argentina

== Participating nations ==
A total of 24 countries have qualified athletes. The number of athletes a nation has entered is in parentheses beside the name of the country.

- Argentina (7)
- Bahamas (3)
- Barbados (1)
- Bolivia (1)
- Brazil (8)
- Canada (10)
- Chile (2)
- Colombia (8)
- Costa Rica (4)
- Cuba (10)
- Dominica (1)
- Dominican Republic (9)
- Ecuador (3)
- El Salvador (1)
- Guatemala (5)
- Honduras (1)
- Mexico (10)
- Nicaragua (4)
- Peru (2)
- Puerto Rico (5)
- Trinidad and Tobago (1)
- United States (11)
- Venezuela (12)
- Virgin Islands (1)

== Qualification ==
A total of 120 boxers (96 male and 24 women) will qualify to compete at the games. The top three boxers in each men's category at the 2015 World Series of Boxing will qualify. The rest of the quotas (including all the women's quotas) will be awarded at a qualification tournament in June 2015. Canada as host nation has an automatic berth in one women's and five men's categories, and will need to qualify in all other categories.

== See also ==
- Boxing at the 2016 Summer Olympics
