= Lenier Peró =

Cuban boxer

Personal information
- Nickname: El Justiciero
- Born: Lenier Eunice Peró Justiz; 24 November 1992 (age 33) Camagüey, Cuba
- Height: 6 ft 3 1/2 in (192 cm)
- Weight: Heavyweight

Boxing career
- Reach: 79 in (201 cm)
- Stance: Southpaw

Boxing record
- Total fights: 14
- Wins: 13
- Win by KO: 8
- Losses: 1
Medal record
Men's amateur boxing
Representing Cuba
Pan American Games
| Gold medal – first place | 2011 Guadalajara | Heavyweight |
| Gold medal – first place | 2015 Toronto | Super heavyweight |
Youth Olympics
| Gold medal – first place | 2010 Singapore | Heavyweight |
Youth World Championships
| Gold medal – first place | 2010 Baku | Heavyweight |

Lenier Eunice Peró Justiz (24 November 1992) is a Cuban professional boxer. As an amateur, he won a gold medal at both the 2011 and 2015 Pan American Games, whilst also competing at the 2016 Olympics. Professional boxer Dainier Peró, who won the 2019 Pan Am Games super heavyweight gold medal and unsuccessfully competed at the 2020 Olympics, is his younger brother.

== Amateur career ==
=== Highlights ===
Olympic result Rio 2016

- Round of 16: Defeated Guido Vianello (Italy) 3–0
- Quarter-finals: Lost to Filip Hrgović (Croatia) TKO

Pan American Games results 2011 Guadalajara

- Quarter-finals: Defeated Steven Couture (Canada) 22–2
- Semi-finals: Defeated Yamil Peralta (Argentina) 13–9
- Final: Defeated Julio Castillo (Ecuador) 16–10

2015 Toronto

- Quarter-finals: Defeated Kieshno Major (Bahamas) 3–0
- Semi-finals: Defeated Cam Awesome (USA) 2–1
- Final: Defeated Edgar Muñoz (Venezuela) 2–1

Youth Olympics results 2010 Singapore

- Preliminaries: Defeated Joshua Temple (USA) RSC
- Semi-finals: Defeated Umit Can Patir (Turkey) 6–0
- Final: Defeated Fabio Turchi (Italy) RSCH

== Professional career ==
Peró made his professional debut on 25 May 2019 against Maksym Pedyura. Peró knocked his opponent down twice en route to securing a first round, technical knockout victory.

After amassing a 3–0 record throughout the rest of 2019, Peró faced Jorge Alejandro Arias for the vacant WBA Fedelatin heavyweight title on 11 December 2020. He won the fight by a second-round knockout. Peró made his first title defense against Dumar Carrascal on 26 June 2021. He made quick work of his opponent, stopping Carrascal in just 111 seconds.

Peró faced Geovany Bruzon on 1 January 2022, on the undercard of the Luis Ortiz vs. Charles Martin pay-per-view bout. He won the fight by unanimous decision. Although Premier Boxing Champions head Al Haymon stated he would sign the winner of the bout, he announced that he had signed both fighters. Peró next faced Hector Perez in the main event of a FITE TV broadcast card, which took place at the Seminole Hard Rock Hotel & Casino Hollywood in Hollywood, Florida on 7 May 2022. He retained the WBA Fedelatin title by a third-round technical knockout. Peró faced the journeyman Joel Caudle in a stay-busy fight on 20 August 2022. He made quick work of his opponent, as he won by a first-round knockout.

On February 12, 2023, Peró pulled off an upset over a previously professionally unbeaten two-time amateur world champion Victor Vykhryst with continuous body shots that broke the latter by the eighth round.

Peró was scheduled to face Jordan Thompson in Orlando, Florida, on November 1, 2025. Pero won the fight by unanimous decision.

Peró faced Jarrell Miller in a WBA heavyweight title eliminator on April 25, 2026, at Fontainebleau Las Vegas in Winchester, Nevada. He lost by unanimous decision.

== Professional boxing record ==
| 14 fights | 13 wins | 1 loss |
|---|---|---|
| By knockout | 8 | 0 |
| By decision | 5 | 1 |

| No. | Result | Record | Opponent | Type | Round, time | Date | Location | Notes |
|---|---|---|---|---|---|---|---|---|
| 14 | Loss | 13–1 | Jarrell Miller | UD | 12 | Apr 25, 2026 | Fontainebleau Las Vegas, Winchester, Nevada, U.S. | |
| 13 | Win | 13–0 | Jordan Thompson | UD | 10 | 1 Nov 2025 | Caribe Royale Orlando, Orlando, Florida, U.S. | |
| 12 | Win | 12–0 | Detrailous Webster | UD | 10 | 18 Apr 2025 | Caribe Royale Orlando, Orlando, Florida, U.S. | |
| 11 | Win | 11–0 | Donnie Palmer | TKO | 1 (10), 2:42 | 22 Mar 2024 | Seminole Hard Rock Hotel and Casino, Hollywood, Florida, U.S. | |
| 10 | Win | 10–0 | Guillermo Ruben Andino | TKO | 1 (10), 2:23 | 29 Sep 2023 | Seminole Hard Rock Hotel and Casino, Hollywood, Florida, U.S. | |
| 9 | Win | 9–0 | Victor Vykhryst | TKO | 8 (10), 2:28 | 12 Feb 2023 | Alamodome, San Antonio, Texas, U.S. | Retained WBA Fedelatin heavyweight title |
| 8 | Win | 8–0 | Joel Caudle | KO | 1 (8), 2:29 | 20 Aug 2022 | Seminole Hard Rock Hotel and Casino, Hollywood, Florida, U.S. | |
| 7 | Win | 7–0 | Hector Perez | TKO | 3 (10), 2:04 | 7 May 2022 | Hialeah Park Racing & Casino, Hialeah, Florida, U.S. | Retained WBA Fedelatin heavyweight title |
| 6 | Win | 6–0 | Geovany Bruzon | UD | 8 | 1 Jan 2022 | Seminole Hard Rock Hotel & Casino, Hollywood, Florida, U.S. | |
| 5 | Win | 5–0 | Dumar Carrascal | KO | 1 (11), 1:51 | 26 Jun 2021 | Discoteca Kilymandiaro, Puerto Colombia, Colombia | Retained WBA Fedelatin heavyweight title |
| 4 | Win | 4–0 | Jorge Alejandro Arias | KO | 2 (10) | 11 Dec 2020 | Estadio Mary Terán de Weiss, Buenos Aires, Argentina | Won vacant WBA Fedelatin heavyweight title |
| 3 | Win | 3–0 | Pavel Doroshilov | MD | 6 | 21 Sep 2019 | Sporthalle, Zinnowitz, Germany | |
| 2 | Win | 2–0 | Artur Kubiak | UD | 6 | 15 Jun 2019 | Sport- und Kongresshalle, Schwerin, Germany | |
| 1 | Win | 1–0 | Maksym Pedyura | TKO | 1 (6), 1:59 | 25 May 2019 | OSZ Sporthalle, Wittenberge, Germany | |

Sporting positions
Regional boxing titles
| Vacant Title last held by Guillermo Jones | WBA Fedelatin heavyweight champion 11 December 2020 – present | Incumbent |
