= Sode guruma jime =

Judo chokehold

Sode guruma jime 袖車絞め
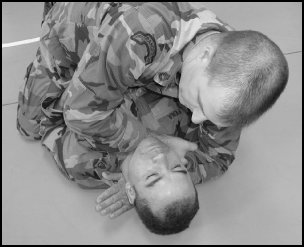
- The top fighter wraps an arm behind his opponent's head and grabs his own sleeve to complete the choke.
- Classification: Katame-waza
- Sub classification: Shime-waza
- Targets: Throat
- Kodokan: Yes

Technique name
- Rōmaji: Sode-guruma Jime
- Japanese: 袖車絞め
- English: Sleeve wheel choke

Sode guruma jime (袖車絞め) ("sleeve wheel constriction"), also known as Ezekiel choke, is a type of chokehold which compresses the opponent’s trachea or the carotid arteries. The choke is commonly used in judo and jiu jitsu.

== Technique ==
The technique can be executed from a variety of positions, but is generally performed by wrapping one arm behind the opponent’s head and grasping onto the sleeve of the gi with the opposite hand. While holding onto the sleeve for leverage, the opposite forearm is brought down across the throat and clinched tight. The choke is directly aided by the use of a gi, but it has also been adapted for no-gi application.

=== No-gi variation ===
Since the choke relies on the leverage created by the gripping of a sleeve, it must be altered slightly to be performed without a gi. Typically, this is accomplished by using the bottom arm to grip the opposite elbow or forearm. It can also be performed without a gi using the fist or wrist instead of the forearm.

== Brazilian jiu-jitsu ==
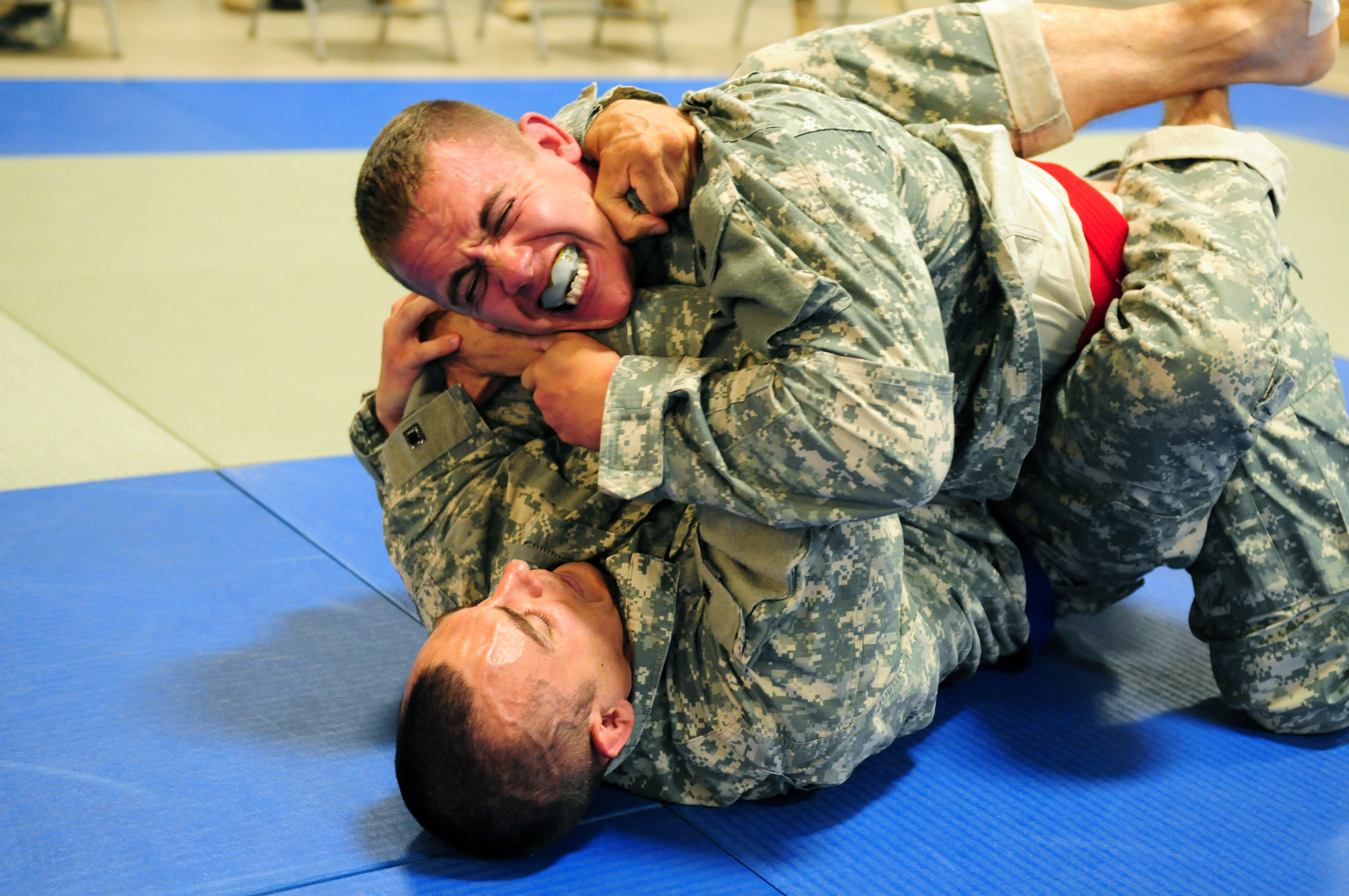
Soldier applying the choke from inside his guard, during US Army combatives competition at the 807th MDSC Best Warrior Competition.

Sode guruma jime is widely known as an Ezequiel choke (Portuguese: estrangulamento Ezequiel) in Brazilian Jiu-Jitsu.

The choke became associated with the judoka Ezequiel Paraguassu from the time he spent at Carlson Gracie’s gym in Copacabana, Rio de Janeiro in 1988 while preparing for the 1988 Olympics in South Korea, in order for him to better his newaza. While training at the gym he had a hard time trying to escape the closed guards of his opponents. Growing increasingly frustrated he decided to use the judo technique and managed to submit a number of his opponents. After a while he was asked to teach the technique to the other students and they soon began referring to it as the Ezequiel choke.

== Notable uses in competition ==
- Remco Pardoel defeated Ryan Parker via sode guruma jime at UFC 7 on 1995.
- The technique has been used successfully in mixed martial arts competition by Hidehiko Yoshida, a 1992 Olympic gold medalist in judo. Yoshida defeated Kiyoshi Tamura via sode guruma jime during Pride Total Elimination 2003, the opening round of Pride Fighting Championship’s 2003 grand prix. Yoshida also won a controversial decision over Royce Gracie at Pride Shockwave in 2002, when the referee thought Gracie had passed out from sode guruma jime.
- Yoshihiro Akiyama defeated Katsuyori Shibata via sode guruma jime during Dream 5 the Lightweight Grand Prix Final Round 2008.
- UFC, M-1 and Bellator MMA veteran and Russian Sambo practitioner Alexey Oleinik has won fourteen fights via Ezekiel choke, including using the Ezekiel choke to defeat Viktor Pešta at UFC Fight Night 103, becoming the first fighter in the company's history to win a match using the move. He subsequently repeated successful use of the technique in his win over Júnior Albini at UFC 224 on May 12, 2018 in Brazil; the first 2 times the move has been used to win a match in the UFC: And the only times until September 10, 2023. In a YouTube interview after the fight, he claimed that his opponent's coach is also affiliated with the gym that Oleynik attends, and that Albini's preparation specifically included defense against this choke.
- Ranked UFC heavyweight fighter, Alexander Volkov (fighter), defeated Tai Tuivasa with this technique on September 10, 2023 at UFC 293, becoming the second man in the UFC to finish someone with this technique: And it being the third time that it had been done to win a match in the UFC. Unlike with the two occasions with Oleinik, Volkov performed the Ezekiel choke on top of his opponent.
- Rani Yahya defeated Eben Kaneshiro by Ezekiel choke at UAGF: Kaos on Kampus on 20 May 2006.

== Included systems ==
- Kodokan judo
- Brazilian jiu-jitsu
- Combat Sambo

== Aliases ==
- Ezequiel choke
- Ezekiel choke
- Sleeve wheel choke
- Sleeve choke
- Scissor choke
- Sleeve wheel constriction
