= USA National Championships Boxing 2014 =

Boxing competitions

The Men's 2014 USA National Championships Boxing 2014 were held in Spokane, USA from January 20 to January 25. It is the 124th edition of this annual competition.

== Medal winners ==
Kategoria wagowa	Gold Medal	Silver Medal	Brown Medal
Light Flyweight (- 49 kg.)	Leroy Davila	Joshua Franco	Melik Elliston; Dominique Sosa
Flyweight (- 52 kg.)	Malik Jackson	Shawn Simpson	Aurel Love; Marshall Sanchez
Bantamweight (- 56 kg.)	JaRico O'Quinn	Sharone Carter	Ramon Cardenas; Jesus Vasquez
Lightweight (- 60 kg.)	Genaro Gamez	Jousce Gonzalez	Charles Vasquez
Light Welterweight (- 64 kg.)	Abraham Nova	Efrain Estrada	Thomas Mattice; Alfonso Olvera
Welterweight (- 69 kg.)	Jose Alday	Chardale Booker	Jeremiah Millett; Timothy Lee
Middleweight (- 75 kg.)	LeShawn Rodriguez	Anthony Campbell	Bryan Flores; Jonathan Esquivel
Light Heavyweight (- 81 kg.)	Julius Butler	Jasper McCargo	Nico Valdes; Dugon Lawton
Heavyweight (- 91 kg.)	Joshua Temple	Sardius Simmons	Earl Newman Jr. Smbat Bagdassarian
Super Heavyweight (+ 91 kg.)	Cam Awesome	Elvis Garcia	Cassius Chaney; Marcellus Williams
