= Boxing at the 2010 Summer Youth Olympics – Men's 91 kg =

Boxing competitions

These are the results of the Men's Heavy 91 kg competition in boxing at the 2010 Summer Youth Olympics in Singapore. Preliminaries were held on August 21, semifinals on August 22, 5th place bout on August 23, the bronze medal bout on August 24 and the Final bout on August 25. Unlike world championships and the Olympic Games, only one bronze medal is awarded.

== Medalists ==
Lenier Eunice Pero
Cuba
Fabio Turchi
Italy
Umit Can Patir
Turkey

== Results ==
Preliminaries
Umit Can Patir (TUR)	4
Alexander Ivanov (RUS)	1
Joshua Temple (USA)
Lenier Eunice Pero (CUB)	RSC

Semifinals
Fabio Turchi (ITA)	7
Siyovush Zukhurov (TJK)	0
Umit Can Patir (TUR)	0
Lenier Eunice Pero (CUB)	6

Final
Fabio Turchi (ITA)
Lenier Eunice Pero (CUB)	RSCH
Third place
Siyovush Zukhurov (TJK)
Umit Can Patir (TUR)	RSC

5th place bout
Alexander Ivanov (RUS)	5
Joshua Temple (USA)	3
