= Simon Kean =

Canadian boxer (born 1989)

Personal information
- Nickname: The Grizzly
- Born: 11 January 1989 (age 37) Trois-Rivières, Quebec, Canada
- Height: 1.96 m (6 ft 5 in)
- Weight: Heavyweight

Boxing career
- Stance: Orthodox

Boxing record
- Total fights: 25
- Wins: 23
- Win by KO: 22
- Losses: 2
Medal record
Men's amateur boxing
Representing Canada
Canadian National Championships
Bronze medal – third place	2009 Trois-Rivières	Super-heavyweight
Gold medal – first place	2010 Quebec City	Super-heavyweight
Gold medal – first place	2014 Mississauga	Super-heavyweight

Simon Kean (born 11 January 1989) is a former Canadian professional boxer. Competing at heavyweight, he was the WBC Francophone champion and held the WBC International Silver and IBO Intercontinental titles during a nine year career. As an amateur he represented Canada at the 2012 Summer Olympics, reaching the super-heavyweight quarter-finals.

== Amateur career ==
Kean qualified for the 2012 Olympics by winning the bronze medal in the super-heavyweight division at the regional qualification tournament in Rio de Janeiro, Brazil. At the Games in London, he defeated France's Tony Yoka on countback in the first round, but then lost to Ivan Dychko from Kazakhstan in the quarter-finals.

He participated at the 2015 Pan American Games in Toronto, losing in the quarter-finals against Cam F. Awesome of the United States.

Kean finished his amateur career with a record of 54 wins and 15 losses.

== Professional career ==
Kean made his professional debut at Parc de l'Exposition in Trois-Rivières on 6 November 2015, stopping Balazs Bodo in the first of their scheduled four rounds.

In his 10th contest in the paid ranks, he won the vacant IBO Intercontinental heavyweight title on 17 June 2017, with a fifth round knockout success over Marcelo Nascimento at the Olympia Theatre in Montreal.

Kean added the vacant WBC Francophone heavyweight title to his collection by stopping Adam Braidwood in the third round at Centre Gervais Auto in Shawinigan on 16 June 2018.

On 6 October 2018, he lost his titles, and unbeaten professional record, when he was stopped in the fourth round by Dillon Carman at Videotron Centre in Quebec City in a contest where the vacant WBA-NABA heavyweight title was also on the line.

A rematch was held at Centre Gervais Auto in Shawinigan on 15 June 2019, and Kean gained revenge for his defeat by stopping Carman in the third round.

He won the vacant WBC International Silver heavyweight title with a final round stoppage of Siarhei Liakhovich at the Bell Centre in Montreal on 7 December 2019.

Kean claimed arguably the biggest scalp of his pro-career on 23 March 2023, when he stopped two-time world title challenger Eric Molina in the seventh round at Montreal Casino.

He faced Joseph Parker for the vacant IBF and WBO Intercontinental heavyweight titles on the undercard of the Tyson Fury vs. Francis Ngannou fight at Kingdom Arena in Riyadh, Saudi Arabia, on 28 October 2023.

Kean announced his retirement from professional boxing on 30 January 2024.

== Professional boxing record ==
25 fights	23 wins	2 losses
By knockout	22	2
By decision	1	0

No.	Result	Record	Opponent	Type	Round, time	Date	Location	Notes
25	Loss	23–2	Joseph Parker	KO	3 (10), 2:04	28 Oct 2023	Kingdom Arena, Riyadh, Saudi Arabia	For vacant IBF and WBO Inter-Continental heavyweight titles
24	Win	23–1	Eric Molina	TKO	7 (10), 2:39	23 Mar 2023	Montreal Casino, Montréal, Quebec, Canada	
23	Win	22–1	Newfel Ouatah	TKO	1 (10), 0:11	9 Sep 2022	Montreal Casino, Montréal, Quebec, Canada	
22	Win	21–1	Shawndell Winters	TKO	9 (10), 1:25	19 Feb 2022	Montreal Casino, Montréal, Quebec, Canada	
21	Win	20–1	Don Haynesworth	RTD	4 (8), 3:00	4 Jun 2021	Hotel Holiday Inn, Cuernavaca, Mexico	
20	Win	19–1	Daniel Martz	KO	3 (10), 0:46	21 Feb 2020	Le Centre Financiere Sun Life, Rimouski, Canada	Retained WBC International Silver heavyweight title
19	Win	18–1	Siarhei Liakhovich	TKO	10 (10), 2:04	7 Dec 2019	Bell Centre, Montréal, Canada	For vacant WBC International Silver heavyweight title
18	Win	17–1	Dillon Carman	TKO	3 (10), 2:56	15 Jun 2019	Centre Gervais Auto, Shawinigan, Quebec, Canada	
17	Win	16−1	Rogelio Omar Rossi	TKO	2 (10), 0:29	16 Mar 2019	Montreal Casino, Montréal, Quebec, Canada	
16	Loss	15–1	Dillon Carman	KO	4 (12), 1:28	6 Oct 2018	Videotron Centre, Quebec City, Canada	Lost WBC Francophone heavyweight title; For WBA-NABA heavyweight title
15	Win	15–0	Adam Braidwood	TKO	3 (10), 1:32	16 Jun 2018	Centre Gervais Auto, Shawinigan, Canada	Retained IBO Inter-Continental heavyweight title; Won vacant WBC Francophone heavyweight title
14	Win	14–0	Ignacio Esparza	KO	5 (10), 2:56	7 Apr 2018	Centre Videotron, Quebec City, Canada	
13	Win	13–0	Alexis Santos	KO	8 (10), 2:01	10 Feb 2018	Centre Gervais Auto, Shawinigan, Canada	Retained IBO Inter-Continental heavyweight title
12	Win	12–0	Mike Sheppard	TKO	2 (8), 0:39	16 Dec 2017	Place Bell, Laval, Canada	
11	Win	11–0	Randy Johnson	KO	2 (10), 0:34	27 Oct 2017	M Telus, Montréal, Canada	
10	Win	10–0	Marcelo Nascimento	KO	5 (10), 0:59	17 Jun 2017	Olympia Theatre, Montréal, Canada	Won vacant IBO Inter-Continental heavyweight title
9	Win	9–0	Mike Marrone	TKO	1 (8), 0:50	6 Apr 2017	Metropolis, Montréal, Canada	
8	Win	8–0	Avery Gibson	UD	8	28 Jan 2017	Bell Centre, Montréal, Canada	
7	Win	7–0	Danny Calhoun	TKO	1 (6), 2:40	19 Nov 2016	Hershey Centre, Mississauga, Canada	
6	Win	6–0	David Torres Garcia	TKO	2 (8), 1:28	22 Oct 2016	Bell Centre, Montréal, Canada	
5	Win	5–0	Daniel Cota	TKO	5 (8), 1:56	27 May 2016	Parc de l'Exposition, Trois-Rivières, Canada	
4	Win	4–0	Travis Fulton	TKO	2 (6), 0:56	12 Mar 2016	Olympia, Montréal, Canada	
3	Win	3–0	Tomas Mrazek	TKO	2 (4), 2:16	21 Feb 2016	Casino du Lac-Leamy, Gatineau, Canada	
2	Win	2–0	Alex Nicholson	KO	1 (4), 2:38	4 Dec 2015	Métropolis, Montréal, Canada	
1	Win	1–0	Balazs Bodo	TKO	1 (4), 1:59	6 Nov 2015	Parc de l'Exposition, Trois-Rivières, Canada	
