= Boxing at the 2010 South American Games – Men's 91kg =

The Men's 91 kg event at the 2010 South American Games had its semifinals held on March 24 and the final on March 27.

== Medalists ==
Gold	Silver	Bronze
Julio Castillo; Ecuador	Jeisson Monroy; Colombia	Rafael Lima; Brazil; Maximiliano Sosa; Argentina

== Results ==
Semifinals
1	Jeisson Monroy (COL)	7
4	Rafael Lima (BRA)	4
3	Maximiliano Sosa (ARG)	5
2	Julio Castillo (ECU)	17

Final
Jeisson Monroy (COL)	1
Julio Castillo (ECU)	8
