= Jordan Thompson (boxer) =

British boxer (born 1993)

Personal information
- Nickname: Troublesome
- Nationality: British
- Born: 7 June 1993 (age 33) Manchester, England
- Height: 6 ft 6 in (198 cm)
- Weight: Cruiserweight

Boxing career
- Stance: Orthodox

Boxing record
- Total fights: 16
- Wins: 15
- Win by KO: 12
- Losses: 2

Jordan Thompson is a British professional boxer. He is a one-time cruiserweight world title challenger.

== Early life ==
Thompson was born in Manchester but has recently moved to London. He is the son of five time martial arts world champion Geoff Thompson and used to play tennis in his youth.

== Professional career ==
Thompson began his pro career in 2015 without having any amateur experience. After 13 fairly easy victories, Thompson fought his first real test against former IBO Cruiserweight challenger Vasil Ducar. Despite getting knocked down in the last round, Thompson did enough to win on points. Thompson then faced British rival Luke Watkins for his next fight in his first defence of his IBF European cruiserweight title. Despite taking a lot of punishment, Thompson dropped Watkins twice in the sixth rounds before the ref waved it off. Thompson then challenged Australian Jai Opetaia for the IBF world title at the Wembley Arena. Opetaia showed the difference in class and easily stopped Thompson in the fourth dropping him twice in the process.

Thompson is scheduled to make his ring return against Lenier Peró in Orlando, FL, on November 1, 2025.

== Professional boxing record ==
17 fights	15 wins	2 losses
By knockout	12	1
By decision	3	1

No.	Result	Record	Opponent	Type	Round, time	Date	Location	Notes
17	Loss	15–2	Lenier Peró	UD	10	1 Nov 2025	Caribe Royale Orlando, Orlando, Florida, USA	
16	Loss	15–1	Jai Opetaia	TKO	4 (12), 0:20	30 Sep 2023	Wembley Arena, London, England	For IBF and The Ring cruiserweight titles
15	Win	15–0	Luke Watkins	TKO	6 (10) 2:07	22 Apr 2023	Cardiff International Arena, Cardiff, Wales	
14	Win	14–0	Vasil Ducar	PTS	10	6 Aug 2022	Sheffield Arena, Sheffield, England	
13	Win	13–0	Mariano Angel Gudino	TKO	2 (8), 0:47	16 Apr 2022	Manchester Arena, Manchester, England	
12	Win	12–0	Piotr Budziszewski	TKO, 0:53	1 (6)	18 Dec 2021	Manchester Arena, Manchester, England	
11	Win	11–0	Piotr Podlucki	KO	1 (4), 2:52	30 Oct 2021	02 Arena, London, England	
10	Win	10–0	Istvan Orsos	KO	3 (6), 1:24	18 Nov 2019	Hilton Hotel, Mayfair, England	
9	Win	9–0	Dmitrij Kalinovskij	TKO	2 (6),	9 Jun 2018	Manchester Arena, Manchester, England	
8	Win	8–0	Michael Pareo	TKO	1 (10), 1:37	7 Oct 2017	Bowlers Exhibition Center, Manchester, England	
7	Win	7–0	Jan Hrazdira	PTS	4	8 Jul 2017	Copper Box Arena, London, England	
6	Win	6–0	Jevgenijs Andrejevs	TKO	2 (4), 0:14	8 Apr 2017	Manchester Arena, Manchester, England	
5	Win	5–0	Florians Strupits	TKO	2 (6), 0:40	18 Nov 2016	Victoria Warehouse, Manchester, England	
4	Win	4–0	Remigijus Ziausys	PTS	4	18 Jun 2016	Guild Hall, Preston, England	
3	Win	3–0	Mateusz Gatek	TKO	1 (4), 1:15	13 May 2016	Bolton Whites Arena, Bolton, England	
2	Win	2–0	Shane Dragonslayer	TKO	1 (4), 0:48	20 Feb 2016	Guild Hall, Preston, England	
1	Win	1–0	Paul Morris	TKO	1 (4), 1:53	16 Dec 2015	Village Hotel, Ashton under Lyne, England	
