= Chris Tuchscherer =

American mixed martial arts fighter

- Born: September 8, 1975 (age 51); Rugby, North Dakota, United States
- Other names: The Crowbar
- Height: 6 ft 2 in (1.88 m)
- Weight: 260.9 lb (118 kg; 18 st 9 lb)
- Division: Heavyweight
- Reach: 76.0 in (193 cm)
- Stance: Orthodox
- Fighting out of: Oak Grove, Minnesota, United States
- Team: Team DeathClutch; Minnesota Martial Arts Academy
- Wrestling: NCAA Division II Wrestling
- Years active: 2004–2011 (MMA)

Mixed martial arts record
- Total: 26
- Wins: 21
- By knockout: 12
- By submission: 4
- By decision: 5
- Losses: 4
- By knockout: 3
- By decision: 1
- No contests: 1

Other information
- Mixed martial arts record from Sherdog

Chris Tuchscherer (born September 8, 1975) is a retired American mixed martial artist who last competed as a Heavyweight for the Ultimate Fighting Championship.

== Background ==
Born in Rugby, North Dakota, Tuchscherer competed in wrestling for Bowman County High School, continuing with the sport at North Dakota State before eventually transferring to NCAA Division II Minnesota State University, Moorhead. At MSUM Tuchscherer participated in Heavyweight NCAA Division II competitions and became a two-time All-American as well as an NCAA Division II Championship Runner-Up.

== Mixed martial arts career ==
=== Early career ===
After using up all of his college eligibility, Tuchscherer - who was already a fan of MMA - was urged by his friends to try competing himself. He tried out for and earned a spot on a local fight card where he won his first amateur match in less than a minute. Tuchscherer continued training at MSUM while helping to coach the university's wrestling team. He later began training at Minnesota Martial Arts Academy with fellow All-American Brock Lesnar.

In his first professional MMA bout Tuchscherer defeated Krzysztof Soszynski by decision. Later in his career, he won the Dakota Fighting Championships Heavyweight Championship, and at Extreme Challenge 85 on October 6, 2007, Tuchscherer defeated Jimmy Ambriz for the EC Heavyweight Championship. He later participated at YAMMA Pit Fighting's only event in a heavyweight tournament where he defeated both Tony Sylvester and Alexey Oleinik by unanimous decision before losing by unanimous decision in the final to Travis Wiuff. Tuchscherer then won the Max Fights Heavyweight Championship on July 19, 2008, by defeating Tony Mendoza at Max Fights 4 before defeating Branden Lee Hinkle on March 21, 2009, at "Beatdown 4" to win the first SNMAA heavyweight championship.

=== Ultimate Fighting Championship ===
Chris Tuchscherer tried out for the tenth season of the Ultimate Fighting Championship's (UFC) reality show, The Ultimate Fighter. The UFC scouts at the tryouts noticed Tuchscherer's professional record and decided to give him a fight at a UFC event rather than go through the show's tournament. As a result, Tuchscherer debuted with the UFC at UFC 102 against Gabriel Gonzaga. Early in their fight Tuchscherer was hit with a hard kick to his groin by Gonzaga. Tuchscherer required several minutes to recover during which he nearly vomited. He managed to convince a group of officials that he was willing and able to continue in the fight. Following the restart of the match, Tuchscherer lost to Gonzaga by technical knockout at 2:27 of the first round.

His next fight was with Tim Hague who was coming off being the subject of the UFC's fastest knockout. Occurring on February 6, 2010, at UFC 109, Tuchscherer was once again faced with being on the receiving end of a low blow early in the first round. He managed to continue this time. However, conditioning for both fighters seemed to be poor as the action throughout the match was sporadic and they were visibly exhausted in the third round. Tuchscherer won the fight by majority decision (29–28, 29–28, and 28–28).

On July 3, 2010, at UFC 116, Tuchscherer faced Brendan Schaub. Tuchscherer lost the fight by TKO in the first round.

Tuchscherer's next bout was against Mark Hunt on February 27, 2011, at UFC 127. Tuchscherer suffered his second consecutive loss when Hunt knocked him out at 1:41 into the second round.

Following his loss to Hunt, Tuchscherer was released from the UFC.

=== Crowbar MMA ===
Chris Tuchscherer ran his own promotion, "Crowbar MMA", that held five events in Fargo, North Dakota and Grand Forks, North Dakota.

== Personal life ==
Tuchscherer and his wife have a daughter and a son. Before becoming a professional fighter, Tuchscherer worked as a plumber.

== Mixed martial arts record ==
Professional record breakdown
26 matches	21 wins	4 losses
By knockout	12	3
By submission	4	0
By decision	5	1
No contests	1	

Res.	Record	Opponent	Method	Event	Date	Round	Time	Location	Notes
Loss	21–4 (1)	Mark Hunt	KO (punch)	UFC 127	February 27, 2011	2	1:41	Sydney, Australia	
Loss	21–3 (1)	Brendan Schaub	TKO (punches)	UFC 116	July 3, 2010	1	1:07	Las Vegas, Nevada, United States	
Win	21–2 (1)	Tim Hague	Decision (majority)	UFC 109	February 6, 2010	3	5:00	Las Vegas, Nevada, United States	
Loss	20–2 (1)	Gabriel Gonzaga	TKO (punches)	UFC 102	August 29, 2009	1	2:27	Portland, Oregon, United States	
Win	20–1 (1)	Jamie Klair	TKO (punches)	SNMMA: Extreme Beatdown	April 11, 2009	1	2:19	Phoenix, Arizona, United States	Defended SNMAA Heavyweight Championship.
Win	19–1 (1)	Branden Lee Hinkle	TKO (punches)	SNMMA: Beatdown at 4 Bears	March 21, 2009	4	4:43	New Town, North Dakota, United States	Won SNMAA Heavyweight Championship.
Win	18–1 (1)	Tony Mendoza	Submission (armbar)	Max Fights 4	July 19, 2008	1	2:43	North Dakota, United States	Won Max Fights Heavyweight Championship.
Loss	17–1 (1)	Travis Wiuff	Decision (unanimous)	YAMMA Pit Fighting	April 11, 2008	3	5:00	Atlantic City, New Jersey, United States	Finals of YAMMA Heavyweight Tournament.
Win	17–0 (1)	Aleksei Oleinik	Decision (unanimous)	YAMMA Pit Fighting	April 11, 2008	1	5:00	Atlantic City, New Jersey, United States	
Win	16–0 (1)	Tony Sylvester	Decision (unanimous)	YAMMA Pit Fighting	April 11, 2008	1	5:00	Atlantic City, New Jersey, United States	
Win	15–0 (1)	Travis Fulton	Decision (unanimous)	Max Fights 2	January 26, 2008	3	5:00	Fargo, North Dakota, United States	
Win	14–0 (1)	Jimmy Ambriz	Submission (rear-naked choke)	Extreme Challenge 85	October 6, 2007	1	4:43	Bismarck, North Dakota, United States	Won EC Heavyweight Championship.
Win	13–0 (1)	Matt Eckerle	TKO (punches)	DFC 9: Dakota vs. the World	March 24, 2007	1	2:17	Grand Forks, North Dakota, United States	
Win	12–0 (1)	Chuck Grigsby	TKO (punches)	DFC 8: Proving Grounds	December 2, 2006	1	3:49	Fargo, North Dakota, United States	
Win	11–0 (1)	Demian Decorah	TKO (punches)	DFC 7: Revolution	October 7, 2006	1	4:24	Bismarck, North Dakota, United States	
NC	10–0 (1)	Josh Hendricks	NC (overturned)	Fightfest 2	April 14, 2006	1	N/A	Canton, Ohio, United States	
Win	10–0	Ed Myers	TKO (punches)	Royce Gracie Fightfest 1	December 9, 2005	1	1:05	Evansville, Indiana, United States	
Win	9–0	Jim Dobson	TKO (punches)	DFC 5: Legends of the Falls	August 13, 2005	1	0:55	Thief River Falls, Minnesota, United States	
Win	8–0	Matt Lafromboise	TKO (submission to punches)	NFA: Last Dam Fights	June 30, 2005	1	1:44	Fargo, North Dakota, United States	
Win	7–0	Chris Clark	TKO (submission to punches)	DFC 4: Nowhere to Run	June 4, 2005	1	1:06	Fargo, North Dakota, United States	
Win	6–0	Jason Miller	TKO (submission to punches)	NFA: Throwdown in Jamestown 2	May 20, 2005	1	0:18	Fargo, North Dakota, United States	
Win	5–0	Karl Knothe	Submission (rear-naked choke)	Cage Fighting Xtreme 3	April 23, 2005	2	N/A	Brainerd, Minnesota, United States	
Win	4–0	Marc Zee	TKO (punches)	DFC 3: Submission Impossible	April 9, 2005	1	2:25	Fargo, North Dakota, United States	
Win	3–0	Noah Inhofer	TKO (punches)	DFC 2: Reloaded	September 25, 2004	1	2:02	Fargo, North Dakota, United States	
Win	2–0	Krzysztof Soszynski	Decision (unanimous)	NFA: Title Trials	June 12, 2004	3	3:00	Moorhead, Minnesota, United States	
Win	1–0	Sean Cooke	Submission (choke)	Dakota Fighting Championships 1	April 17, 2004	1	0:28	Fargo, North Dakota, United States	

== See also ==
- List of current UFC fighters
- List of male mixed martial artists
