= Adam Braidwood =

Canadian football player, boxer and actor (born 1984)

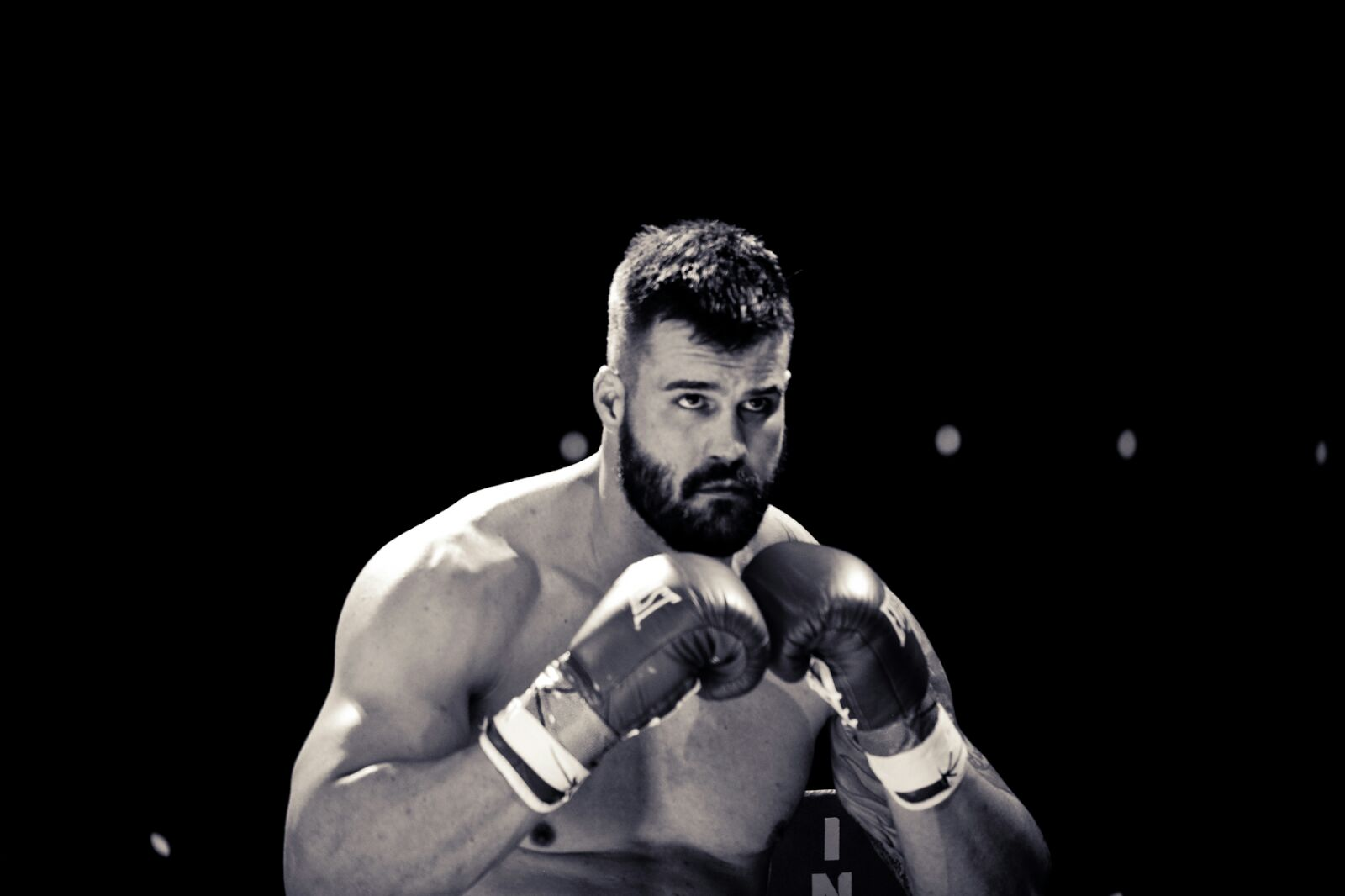
- Braidwood vs. Valimaki 2016
- Born: June 1, 1984 (age 42); Richmond, British Columbia, Canada
- Other names: The Boogeyman
- Height: 6 ft 4 in (1.93 m)
- Weight: 250 lb (110 kg; 18 st)
- Division: Heavyweight
- Stance: Orthodox
- Fighting out of: Delta, British Columbia, Canada
- Team: Pro Camp
- Years active: 2007 (MMA); 2009, 2015–present (Boxing)

Professional boxing record
- Total: 17
- Wins: 14
- By knockout: 13
- Losses: 3
- By knockout: 3

Mixed martial arts record
- Total: 1
- Wins: 1
- Losses: 0

Other information
- Mixed martial arts record from Sherdog

Adam Braidwood (born June 1, 1984) is a Canadian professional boxer, actor, martial artist and retired professional football defensive end.

He spent the entirety of his professional football career with the Edmonton Eskimos of the Canadian Football League, having started with the team in 2006.

== Early career ==
While attending Seaquam Secondary School in Delta, Braidwood got his start in major football competition when he attended Washington State University, making their football squad as a true freshman in 2002 (and making the conference all-freshman team). Over the course of his collegiate career, Braidwood recorded 13.5 sacks, 8.5 of which came in his senior year where he started all thirteen games and was among the top ten in the Pacific-10 conference in tackles.

== Professional football career ==
Adam Braidwood
No. 91
- Position: Defensive end

Personal information
- Listed height: 6 ft 4.20 in (1.94 m)
- Listed weight: 250 lb (113 kg)

Career information
- High school: Seaquam
- College: Washington State
- CFL draft: 2006: 1st round, 1st overall pick

Career history
- 2006–2010: Edmonton Eskimos

Awards and highlights
- Eskimos' Most Outstanding Rookie (2006)

Braidwood was drafted first overall by the Edmonton Eskimos in the 2006 Canadian College Draft. Despite playing college football in the United States, as a Canadian-born player he was considered a non-import under CFL roster rules.

At 6'4" and 250 pounds, Braidwood was known for his strength on the outside. He is the two-time winner of the strongest man award at Washington State. He recorded his first professional touchdown on September 8, 2006, recovering a fumble from Calgary Stampeders quarterback Henry Burris and taking it into the endzone during the rematch of the Labour Day Classic in Edmonton.

== Professional boxing career ==
Braidwood has been ranked as the number one heavyweight in Western Canada and the ninth ranked overall with KO boxing and The Firm Sports Management. In 2009, Braidwood defeated Devon Garnon by knockout. More recently, December 2015, the former Edmonton Eskimo fought Paul MacKenzie (P-Mac), defeating him by technical knot.

In March 2016, Braidwood's fight against Victor Välimäki came to a decision at the end of the third round. Since then, the heavyweight has consistently won by TKO, maintaining an almost-perfect record of wins by TKO in 2016. In June 2016, Braidwood defeated Todd Stoute by KO at 3:00 of round 2. Braidwood added another win to his record in September 2016, when he knocked out Adam Queried at 2:30 of the first round. Again, Braidwood emerged victorious over Lee Mein at 2:07 in the first round on December 2, 2016, in Edmonton, AB . This year, Braidwood has racked up four more victories, making him the number one heavyweight in Western Canada.

Braidwood defeated Eric Martel Bahoeli on February 24, 2017, to win the WBU Heavyweight Title, in Quebec City making him the number one heavyweight boxer of the WBU. Bahoeli was ranked seventh (11-6-1) at the time of the fight in World Boxing Union (WBU) ranks. The 12-round title fight lasted a total of 5 rounds (2:50), before finally knocking him out. In the 4th round, Braidwood sustained a large cut above one of his eyes from a series of seconds in which he taunted Bahoeli to "hit me harder." It was a violent matchup, but it is no surprise that Braidwood emerged victorious, as he packs one of the heaviest punches in the league.

On June 16, 2017, he competed against Tim Hague in Edmonton. Hague suffered a serious brain injury in the fight, and died two days later in a nearby hospital.

Braidwood challenged IBO Intercontinental heavyweight champion Simon Kean at Centre Gervais Auto in Shawinigan, on 16 June 2018, with the vacant WBC Francophone heavyweight title also on the line. He lost by stoppage in the third round.

== Legal troubles ==
On November 23, 2010, Braidwood and two other men were charged after an incident late the previous Friday afternoon in Spruce Grove, Alberta.

On April 19, 2013, Braidwood was sentenced to 4 1/2 years for sexually assaulting a former girlfriend.

On September 10, 2013, Braidwood pleaded guilty to other remaining Alberta charges and sentencing proceeded. The sentence ran concurrently with his other convictions.

In June 2018, Braidwood was arrested and charged for assaulting a girlfriend and parole violations. He served four months in prison and was released October 2018.

In June 2019, Braidwood was charged for domestic assault and forcible confinement to another girlfriend. On July 6, 2020 he pleaded guilty to assault charges.

In December 2019, Braidwood violated parole conditions of no contact and was arrested and charged with breach of parole and intimidation of justice. On November 25, 2020, he pleaded guilty to charges.

== Championships and accomplishments ==
- World Boxing Union
  - WBU Heavyweight Championship (One time)

== Professional boxing record ==
16 fights	14 wins	2 losses
By knockout	13	2
By decision	1	0

No.	Result	Record	Opponent	Method	Round, time	Date	Location	Notes
16	Win	14–2	(United States) Andrew Satterfield	TKO	2 (8), 1:17	Jun 15, 2019	(Canada) Centre Gervais Auto, Shawinigan, Quebec	
15	Loss	13–2	(Canada) Simon Kean	TKO	3 (10), 1:32	Jun 16, 2018	(Canada) Centre Gervais Auto, Shawinigan, Quebec	For the IBO Inter-Continental Heavyweight Title; For Vacant WBC Francophone Heavyweight Title
14	Win	13–1	(Mexico) Hugo Leon	TKO	4 (6), 1:21	Apr 28, 2018	(Canada) Shaw Conference Centre, Edmonton, Alberta	
13	Win	12–1	(Mexico) Jesus Manuel Paez	KO	1 (6), 2:15	Mar 31, 2018	(Canada) Montreal Casino, Montreal, Quebec	
12	Win	11–1	(Mexico) Misael Sanchez	TKO	2 (8), 1:26	Dec 8, 2017	(Canada) Shaw Conference Centre, Edmonton, Alberta	
11	Win	10–1	(Mexico) Christian Larrondo	TKO	4 (6), 2:02	Sep 22, 2017	(Canada) Shaw Conference Centre, Edmonton, Alberta	
10	Win	9–1	(Mexico) Wilfrido Leal	KO	1 (8), 1:58	Sep 8, 2017	(Canada) Western Speedway, Victoria, British Columbia	
9	Win	8–1	(Canada) Tim Hague	KO	2 (8), 2:08	June 16, 2017	(Canada) Shaw Conference Centre, Edmonton, Alberta	
8	Win	7–1	(Canada) Eric Martel Bahoeli	KO	5 (12), 2:01	Feb 24, 2017	(Canada) Centre Videotron, Quebec City, Quebec	Won Vacant WBU Heavyweight Title
7	Win	6–1	(Canada) Lee Mein	KO	1 (4), 2:20	Dec 2, 2016	(Canada) Shaw Conference Centre, Edmonton, Alberta	
6	Win	5–1	(United States) Adam Querido	TKO	1 (6), 2:35	Sep 9, 2016	(Canada) Shaw Conference Centre, Edmonton, Alberta	
5	Win	4–1	(Canada) Todd Stoute	KO	2 (4), 3:00	June 17, 2016	(Canada) Shaw Conference Centre, Edmonton, Alberta	
4	Win	3–1	(Canada) Victor Valimaki	MD	4	Mar 11, 2016	(Canada) Shaw Conference Centre, Edmonton, Alberta	
3	Win	2–1	(Canada) Paul Mackenzie	TKO	2 (4), 0:53	Dec 4, 2015	(Canada) Shaw Conference Centre, Edmonton, Alberta	
2	Loss	1–1	(Canada) Lee Mein	TKO	1 (4), 1:06	April 9, 2009	(Canada) Shaw Conference Centre, Edmonton, Alberta	
1	Win	1–0	(Canada) Devon Garnon	TKO	1 (4), 0:47	Jan 24, 2009	(Canada) Shaw Conference Centre, Edmonton, Alberta	Professional debut

== Mixed martial arts record ==
Professional record breakdown
1 match	1 win	0 losses
By knockout	1	0

Res.	Record	Opponent	Method	Event	Date	Round	Time	Location	Notes
Win	1–0	Ryan Jimmo	TKO (punches)	MFC 11: Gridiron	February 3, 2007	1	1:54	Edmonton, Alberta, Canada	
