= Tim Hague =

Canadian mixed martial artist (1983–2017)

- Born: Timothy Edward Lee Hague; May 9, 1983; Boyle, Alberta, Canada
- Died: June 18, 2017 (aged 34); Edmonton, Alberta
- Other names: The Thrashing Machine
- Height: 6 ft 4 in (1.93 m)
- Weight: 264 lb (120 kg; 18 st 12 lb)
- Division: Heavyweight (265 lb)
- Reach: 76 in (190 cm)
- Style: Wrestling, BJJ, Boxing
- Stance: Orthodox
- Fighting out of: Edmonton, Alberta, Canada
- Team: Cardinal BJJ & MMA
- Rank: Purple belt in Brazilian Jiu-Jitsu
- Years active: 2006–2017 (MMA) 2011, 2016–2017 (Boxing)

Professional boxing record
- Total: 4
- Wins: 1
- By knockout: 1
- Losses: 3
- By knockout: 2

Mixed martial arts record
- Total: 34
- Wins: 21
- By knockout: 15
- By submission: 4
- By decision: 2
- Losses: 13
- By knockout: 8
- By decision: 5

Other information
- Boxing record from BoxRec
- Mixed martial arts record from Sherdog

Timothy Edward Lee Hague (May 9, 1983 – June 18, 2017) was a Canadian mixed martial artist and boxer who competed in the heavyweight division, most recently for Absolute Championship Berkut. He became a professional fighter in 2006, and formerly competed for the Ultimate Fighting Championship, World Series of Fighting and King of the Cage, where he went 11–0 and was the King of the Cage Canada Heavyweight Champion. On June 16, 2017, he suffered a brain hemorrhage after being knocked out in a boxing match against Adam Braidwood in Edmonton, Alberta. He died on June 18, 2017.

== Biography ==
Hague had a Bachelor of Arts from Augustana University College and an Elementary Education degree from the University of Alberta. Prior to beginning his MMA career, he was an elementary school teacher at École Bellevue School in Beaumont, Alberta. Hague died on June 18, 2017, after suffering a brain injury in a match with former Canadian Football League (CFL) defensive end Adam Braidwood.

== Mixed martial arts career ==
=== Early career ===
Hague made his MMA debut against Eric MacDonald at King Of The Cage Canada: Detonator in 2006. Hague came out victorious winning via submission. Hague went on to win his next 3 fights and subsequently won the vacant KOTC Canada heavyweight title over Adriano Bernardo in only his fifth fight. His only loss came to Miodrag Petkovic in a split decision. Before signing with Ultimate Fighting Championship, Hague got a rematch against Petkovic and won by unanimous decision.

=== Ultimate Fighting Championship ===
Hague made his debut against former professional kickboxer, Pat Barry at UFC 98. Hague upset Barry by submitting him using a guillotine choke early in the first round.

Hague fought Todd Duffee on the UFC 102 preliminary card on August 29, 2009. Heavyweight Todd Duffee scored, what was then the fastest official KO in UFC history over Hague at 0:07 into the fight. In his fight against Chris Tuchscherer on February 6, 2010, at UFC 109, Hague lost a controversial majority decision after 3 rounds (29–28, 29–28, and 28–28). Joe Rogan said that it may have been the worst decision he had ever seen in his entire life. Following his loss to Tuchscherer, Hague was released from the promotion.

==== UFC Return ====
On April 21, 2010, it was reported that Chad Corvin had pulled out of his UFC 113 bout against Joey Beltran due to his medical paperwork not being approved by the Quebec Athletic Commission, and Hague had been selected to step in. Hague faced Beltran on the preliminary card of the May 8 event and lost via unanimous decision (30–27, 30–26, and 29–28).

Hague faced Matt Mitrione on January 22, 2011, at UFC Fight Night 23. He lost the fight via TKO due to punches in the first round. He was then released from the UFC with a promotional record of 1–4.

=== The Fight Club ===
Shortly after being released from his UFC contract, Hague signed a multi-fight deal with Edmonton, Alberta-based promotion The Fight Club. His first fight was scheduled to be on March 19 at TFC 10, against Tyler East. East, however, was forced to withdraw and Ed Carpenter was named as his replacement. Carpenter was then sent to the hospital with an undisclosed medical issue an hour prior to the event.

=== Regional promotions ===
On July 9, 2010, Hague faced Ultimate Fighter Season 10 veteran Zak Jensen at AMMA 4: Victory, and won via KO due to knees in the first round.

Hague then faced fellow UFC vet, Travis Wiuff, at AMMA 5: Uprising on October 1, 2010, event in Edmonton, Alberta. He won the fight via Knockout in the first round.

Hague made a valiant 3 Full Round effort against Mike Hackert facing a loss in Fort McMurray, Alberta. Following this loss he went back to the drawing board, took a vacation to Mexico with friend and fellow fighter Spencer Hendricks, and came back with a mindset to get himself UFC bound. Hague then rematched Hackert at the Mayfield Trade Center for the #1 Canadian Heavyweight Ranking. Facing a first-round TKO, Hague announced his retirement from MMA following the bout.

In March 2013, Hague announced his return to the cage. He fought former UFC middleweight Kalib Starnes at Aggression Fighting Championship 19 in Edmonton, Alberta on July 5, 2013. He lost the fight via unanimous decision.

Hague faced Smealinho Rama on May 23, 2014, in Edmonton, Alberta for the Unified MMA promotion. He lost via TKO in the first round.

Hague faced Dwayne Lewis on September 19, 2014, in Fort McMurray, Alberta at Prestige Fighting Championship 6. He won the fight via KO in the first round.

Hague faced to Evgeny Erokhin on August 29, 2015, at League S-70: Russia vs. World. He lost via knockout.

=== World Series of Fighting ===
Hague made his World Series of Fighting debut against Lee Mein on February 21, 2014, at WSOF Canada 1. He won the fight via TKO in the first round.

Hague faced Matt Baker on June 7, 2014, at WSOF Canada 2. He won the fight via TKO in the first round.

Hague faced Craig Hudson on October 11, 2014, at WSOF 14 in a rematch where Hague was previously victorious. He won the fight via TKO in the third round.

=== Absolute Championship Berkut ===
In his final MMA fight, Hague was quickly knocked out by a head kick from Michał Andryszak at ACB 41.

== Boxing and death ==
Hague made his boxing debut on December 9, 2011, knocking out Patrick Graham in the Shaw Conference Centre in Edmonton. After a hiatus, he returned to the venue twice in 2016, dropping a unanimous decision to Stan Ahumada in September and losing by TKO to Mladen Miljas that December. Hague was removed from life support and died on June 18, 2017, of injuries sustained during a boxing match at the Shaw Conference Centre on June 16, 2017, at Edmonton, Canada, with Adam Braidwood. He was 34 years old at the time of his death. His death triggered the Edmonton city council to pass a new law to impose a ban of one year on combat sports in Edmonton. On January 23, 2018, the ban was lifted.

== Championships and accomplishments ==
- Ultimate Fighting Championship
  - UFC.com Awards
    - 2009: Ranked #10 Submission of the Year vs. Pat Barry
- King of the Cage
  - KOTC Canada Heavyweight Championship (One time)
- Unified MMA
  - Unified MMA Heavyweight Championship (One time)

== Mixed martial arts record ==
Professional record breakdown
34 matches	21 wins	13 losses
By knockout	15	8
By submission	4	0
By decision	2	5

Res.	Record	Opponent	Method	Event	Date	Round	Time	Location	Notes
Loss	21–13	Michał Andryszak	TKO (head kick and punches)	ACB 41	July 15, 2016	1	0:33	Sochi, Russia	
Win	21–12	Kalib Starnes	TKO (leg kicks)	Xcessive Force FC 9	April 15, 2016	4	0:13	Grande Prairie, Alberta, Canada	Won the XFFC Heavyweight Championship.
Loss	20–12	Tanner Boser	KO (elbows)	Unified MMA 26	March 4, 2016	2	2:30	Edmonton, Alberta, Canada	
Loss	20–11	Tony Lopez	TKO (punches)	Unified MMA 25	December 18, 2015	3	3:24	Edmonton, Alberta, Canada	Lost the Unified MMA Heavyweight Championship.
Loss	20–10	Evgeny Erokhin	KO (punch)	League S-70: Plotforma Cup 2015	August 29, 2015	1	3:05	Sochi, Russia	
Win	20–9	Tanner Boser	KO (punch)	Unified MMA 22	March 27, 2015	1	0:06	Edmonton, Alberta, Canada	Won the Unified MMA Heavyweight Championship.
Win	19–9	Craig Hudson	TKO (punches)	WSOF 14	October 11, 2014	3	2:55	Edmonton, Alberta, Canada	
Win	18–9	Dwayne Lewis	KO (punch)	Prestige FC 6	September 19, 2014	1	3:09	Fort McMurray, Alberta, Canada	Catchweight (280 lb) bout; Hague missed weight.
Win	17–9	Matt Baker	TKO (punches)	WSOF Canada 2	June 7, 2014	1	3:56	Edmonton, Alberta, Canada	
Loss	16–9	Smealinho Rama	TKO (punches)	Unified MMA 19	May 23, 2014	1	1:41	Edmonton, Alberta, Canada	
Win	16–8	Lee Mein	TKO (punches)	WSOF Canada 1	February 21, 2014	1	4:21	Edmonton, Alberta, Canada	
Loss	15–8	Kalib Starnes	Decision (unanimous)	Aggression FC 19	July 5, 2013	3	5:00	Edmonton, Alberta, Canada	
Win	15–7	Jordan Tracey	TKO (punches)	KOTC: Earthquake	June 7, 2013	1	2:25	Edmonton, Alberta, Canada	
Loss	14–7	Mike Hackert	TKO (punches)	Maximum FC 34	August 10, 2012	1	2:27	Edmonton, Canada, Canada	
Loss	14–6	Mike Hackert	Decision (unanimous)	Prestige FC 4	May 18, 2012	3	5:00	Fort McMurray, Alberta, Canada	
Win	14–5	Craig Hudson	KO (punch)	KOTC: Unified	April 28, 2012	1	2:06	Grande Prairie, Alberta Canada	
Win	13–5	Vince Lucero	Submission (guillotine choke)	Aggression MMA 8	September 16, 2011	1	1:14	Edmonton, Alberta Canada	
Loss	12–5	Matt Mitrione	TKO (punches)	UFC: Fight for the Troops 2	January 22, 2011	1	2:59	Killeen, Texas, United States	
Win	12–4	Travis Wiuff	KO (punch)	Aggression MMA 5	October 1, 2010	1	1:50	Edmonton, Alberta, Canada	
Win	11–4	Zak Jensen	TKO (knees)	Aggression MMA 4	July 9, 2010	1	2:11	Edmonton, Alberta, Canada	
Loss	10–4	Joey Beltran	Decision (unanimous)	UFC 113	May 8, 2010	3	5:00	Montreal, Quebec, Canada	
Loss	10–3	Chris Tuchscherer	Decision (majority)	UFC 109	February 6, 2010	3	5:00	Las Vegas, Nevada, United States	
Loss	10–2	Todd Duffee	KO (punches)	UFC 102	August 29, 2009	1	0:07	Portland, Oregon, United States	
Win	10–1	Pat Barry	Submission (guillotine choke)	UFC 98	May 23, 2009	1	1:42	Las Vegas, Nevada, United States	
Win	9–1	Miodrag Petković	Decision (unanimous)	Raw Combat: Redemption	October 25, 2008	3	5:00	Calgary, Alberta, Canada	
Win	8–1	Sherman Pendergarst	TKO (punches)	KOTC: Unrefined	September 18, 2008	2	0:37	Edmonton, Alberta, Canada	
Win	7–1	Jeff Lundburg	KO (knee)	KOTC: Moment de Vérité	June 20, 2008	1	N/A	Montreal, Quebec, Canada	Defended the KOTC Canada Heavyweight Championship.
Win	6–1	Jared Kilkenny	KO (punch)	KOTC: Brawl in the Mall 3	April 4, 2008	1	0:09	Edmonton, Alberta, Canada	Defended the KOTC Canada Heavyweight Championship.
Loss	5–1	Miodrag Petković	Decision (split)	Hardcore CF: Destiny	February 1, 2008	3	5:00	Calgary, Alberta, Canada	
Win	5–0	Adriano Bernardo	TKO (punches)	KOTC: Brawl in the Mall 1	August 17, 2007	2	3:49	Edmonton, Alberta, Canada	Won the inaugural KOTC Canada Heavyweight Championship.
Win	4–0	Ruben Villareal	Decision (unanimous)	KOTC: Megiddo	April 28, 2007	3	5:00	Vernon, British Columbia, Canada	
Win	3–0	Jared Kilkenny	TKO (punches)	KOTC: Amplified	November 26, 2006	2	0:31	Edmonton, Alberta, Canada	
Win	2–0	Jessie Jones	Submission (verbal)	KOTC: Icebreaker	November 3, 2006	1	3:12	Prince George, British Columbia, Canada	
Win	1–0	Eric Macdonald	Submission (guillotine choke)	KOTC: Detonator	September 29, 2006	2	N/A	Calgary, Alberta, Canada	Heavyweight debut.

== Professional boxing record ==
4 fights	1 win	3 losses
By knockout	1	2
By decision	0	1

No.	Result	Record	Opponent	Type	Round, time	Date	Location	Notes
4	Loss	1–3	(Canada) Adam Braidwood	KO	2 (8), 2:08	Jun 16, 2017	Shaw Conference Centre, Edmonton, Alberta, Canada	Died 2 days later due to injuries sustained during the bout.
3	Loss	1–2	(Canada) Mladen Miljas	TKO	1 (4), 2:58	Dec 2, 2016	Shaw Conference Centre, Edmonton, Alberta, Canada	
2	Loss	1–1	(Canada) Stan Surmacz Ahumada	UD	4	Sep 9, 2016	Shaw Conference Centre, Edmonton, Alberta, Canada	
1	Win	1–0	(Canada) Patrick Graham	KO	2 (4), 1:31	Dec 9, 2011	Shaw Conference Centre, Edmonton, Alberta, Canada	
