= Anthony Campbell (boxer) =

American boxer (born 1990)

Personal information
- Born: 27 May 1990 (age 35); Covington, Tennessee, U.S.

Sport
- Sport: Boxing

Anthony Campbell (born May 27, 1990) is an amateur boxer from the United States.

== Career ==
Campbell was a silver medalist at the USA National Championships Boxing 2014.

At the 2015 Pan American Games, Campbell fought as a middleweight, but lost in the quarterfinals.

At the 2015 AIBA World Boxing Championships, Campbell fought as a middleweight, winning his first match and losing his second match.
