= Branden Lee Hinkle =

American MMA fighter

- Born: July 29, 1973 (age 53); Jefferson, Ohio, United States
- Other names: The Iron Lion
- Height: 6 ft 2 in (1.88 m)
- Weight: 230 lb (104 kg; 16 st 6 lb)
- Division: Heavyweight; Light Heavyweight
- Reach: 76 in (193 cm)
- Stance: Orthodox
- Fighting out of: Weirton, West Virginia, United States
- Team: Team Hammer House
- Years active: 1998-2016

Mixed martial arts record
- Total: 29
- Wins: 17
- By knockout: 12
- By submission: 3
- By decision: 2
- Losses: 11
- By knockout: 2
- By submission: 8
- By decision: 1
- No contests: 1

Other information
- Mixed martial arts record from Sherdog

Branden Lee Hinkle is a retired American professional mixed martial artist. A professional competitor from 1998 until 2016, he competed for the UFC, RINGS, Vale Tudo Japan, Pancrase, the WEF, and the International Vale Tudo Championship.

== Background ==
Born and raised in Jefferson, Ohio, Hinkle holds an accomplished wrestling background, competing at West Liberty State College in West Virginia where he was a two-time NCAA Division II Champion, a U.S. National Freestyle Wrestling All-American and also excelled at tennis, being a West Virginia College Conference Tennis Champion.

== Mixed martial arts career ==
=== Early career ===
Hinkle was offered a fight in Brazil for $1,000 and an all-expenses paid trip. He accepted and made his professional debut against future PRIDE veteran Ebenezer Fontes Braga in 1998 for the International Vale Tudo organization in Brazil. The inexperienced Hinkle lost the fight by submission (triangle choke). After amassing a 12-6-1 record, with wins over Travis Fulton, Yoshihisa Yamamoto, and Jorge Rivera, Hinkle was signed by the UFC.

=== Ultimate Fighting Championship ===
Hinkle made his UFC debut against Sean Gannon at UFC 55. Gannon, a former Boston police officer, had gained fame for defeating Kimbo Slice in an organized but unsanctioned fight that was uploaded to YouTube. Hinkle won the fight by TKO, but dropped his next three consecutive fights against veteran Jeff Monson, former WEC Light Heavyweight Champion Jason Lambert, and another UFC veteran, Alexandre Ferreira.

=== Post-UFC ===
Hinkle then bounced back with a unanimous decision win over former PRIDE veteran Roman Zentsov before facing fellow collegiate wrestler and future UFC veteran, Chris Tuchscherer. Hinkle was knocked out by punches. In his next fight he faced UFC and Strikeforce veteran Kevin Jordan, and won by TKO.

Hinkle then debuted in Pancrase, but lost by submission (rear-naked choke). Hinkle's last professional fight was in 2016, in Woodward, Oklahoma, which he won by submission.

== Championships and accomplishments ==
=== Wrestling ===
- National Collegiate Athletic Association
  - NCAA Division II Champion
- USA Wrestling
  - US National Freestyle Wrestling All-American

=== Mixed martial arts ===
- Neo Fight
  - Korean Neo Fight World Heavyweight Champion
- World Extreme Fighting
  - World Extreme Fighting Heavyweight Champion

=== Tennis ===
- West Virginia Intercollegiate Athletic Conference
  - WV College Conference Tennis Champion

== Mixed martial arts record ==
Professional record breakdown
31 matches	19 wins	11 losses
By knockout	12	2
By submission	5	8
By decision	2	1
No contests	1	

Res.	Record	Opponent	Method	Event	Date	Round	Time	Location	Notes
Win	17–11 (1)	Marvin Babe	Submission	Horsepower Promotions: Fists of Fury 10	February 6, 2016	1	2:43	Woodward, Oklahoma United States	
Win	16–11 (1)	Alonzo Roane	TKO (punches)	Reality Cage Combat: West Virginia vs. the World	May 18, 2012	2	1:39	Charleston, West Virginia United States	
Loss	15–11 (1)	Jessie Gibbs	Submission (rear-naked choke)	PFC 3: Pancrase Fighting Championship 3	April 2, 2011	1	2:25	Marseille, France	
Win	15–10 (1)	Kevin Jordan	TKO (punches)	DFL 1: The Big Bang	November 24, 2010	1	2:30	Atlantic City, New Jersey, United States	
Loss	14–10 (1)	Chris Tuchscherer	TKO (punches)	SNMMA: Beatdown at 4 Bears	March 21, 2009	4	4:43	New Town, North Dakota, United States	
Win	14–9 (1)	Roman Zentsov	Decision (unanimous)	BodogFIGHT: Alvarez vs Lee	July 14, 2007	3	5:00	Trenton, New Jersey, United States	
Loss	13–9 (1)	Alexandre Ferreira	Submission (heel hook)	GFC: Evolution	May 19, 2007	1	0:37	Columbus, Ohio, United States	Return to Heavyweight.
Loss	13–8 (1)	Jason Lambert	TKO (punches)	UFC Fight Night 5	June 28, 2006	1	5:00	Las Vegas, Nevada, United States	Light Heavyweight debut.
Loss	13–7 (1)	Jeff Monson	Technical Submission (north-south choke)	UFC 57: Liddell vs. Couture 3	February 4, 2006	1	4:35	Las Vegas, Nevada, United States	
Win	13–6 (1)	Sean Gannon	TKO (punches)	UFC 55	October 7, 2005	1	4:14	Uncasville, Connecticut, United States	
Win	12–6 (1)	Jason DeAngelo	TKO (submission to strikes)	HHCF 21: Redemption	August 26, 2005	1	N/A	Columbus, Ohio, United States	
Win	11–6 (1)	Tommy Sauer	TKO (punches)	WEF: Sin City	May 20, 2005	1	2:19	Las Vegas, Nevada, United States	
Win	10–6 (1)	Daisuke Watanabe	Decision	NF 5: Neo Fight 5	October 2, 2004	3	5:00	South Korea	
Win	9–6 (1)	Sim Kyum Kim	TKO (punches)	NF 5: Neo Fight 5	October 2, 2004	1	3:26	South Korea	
Win	8–6 (1)	Sang Hyun Park	TKO (leg kick)	NF 2: Neo Fight 2	December 20, 2003	1	1:00	Seoul, South Korea	
NC	7–6 (1)	Sang Min Lee	No Contest	NF 2: Neo Fight 2	December 20, 2003	N/A	N/A	Seoul, South Korea	
Win	7–6	Rogelio Sanchez	Submission (armbar)	VTX: Vale Todo Xtremeo 1	November 22, 2003	1	1:23	Nuevo Laredo, Mexico	
Win	6–6	Eric Knox	TKO (submission to punches)	NLF: Next Level Fighting	September 13, 2003	1	1:00	Steubenville, Ohio, United States	
Loss	5–6	Gabriel Gonzaga	Submission (triangle choke)	Meca 9: Meca World Vale Tudo 9	August 1, 2003	1	3:54	Rio de Janeiro, Brazil	
Win	5–5	Jorge Rivera	TKO (corner stoppage)	RSF 2: Attack at the Track	June 23, 2001	2	1:54	Chester, West Virginia, United States	
Win	4–5	George Allen	TKO (punches)	RSF 1: Redemption in the Valley	April 21, 2001	2	N/A	Wheeling, West Virginia, United States	
Loss	3–5	Volk Han	Submission (triangle armbar)	RINGS: Millennium Combine 2	June 15, 2000	1	8:11	Tokyo, Japan	
Win	3–4	Yoshihisa Yamamoto	Submission (rear-naked choke)	WEF 9: World Class	May 13, 2000	1	2:21	Evansville, Indiana, United States	
Loss	2–4	Wataru Sakata	Submission (leg lock)	RINGS: Millennium Combine 1	April 20, 2000	1	7:23	Tokyo, Japan	
Loss	2–3	Maurice Smith	Decision (majority)	RINGS: King of Kings 1999 Block B	December 22, 1999	2	5:00	Osaka, Japan	
Win	2–2	Travis Fulton	TKO (injury)	HFP: Holiday Fight Party	December 11, 1999	1	12:38	Georgia, United States	
Loss	1–2	Carlos Barreto	Submission (guillotine choke)	IVC 8: The Road Back to the Top	January 20, 1999	1	4:32	Aracaju, Brazil	
Win	1–1	Masanori Suda	TKO (upkicks)	VTJ 1998: Vale Tudo Japan 1998	October 25, 1998	1	5:26	Urayasu, Japan	
Loss	0–1	Ebenezer Fontes Braga	Submission (triangle choke)	IVC 6: The Challenge	August 23, 1998	1	12:33	São Paulo, Brazil	
