= Aleksei Oleinik =

Russian mixed martial artist (born 1977)

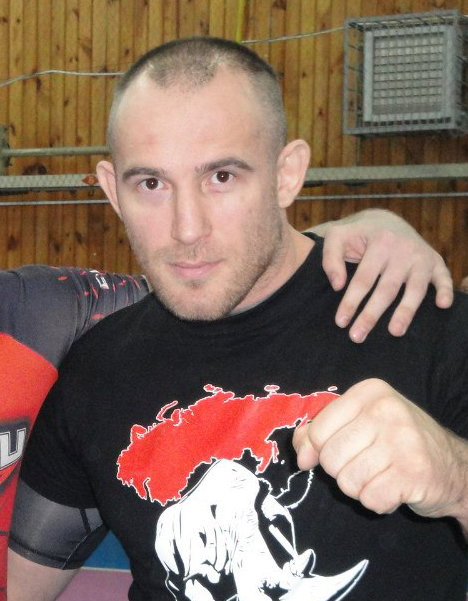
- Oleinik in 2012
- Born: Oleksíy Oleksíyovych Olíynyk; June 25, 1977 (age 49); Kharkiv, Ukrainian SSR, Soviet Union
- Native name: Uk: Олексі́й Олексі́йович Олі́йник; Ru: Алексей Алексеевич Олейник
- Other names: The Boa Constrictor
- Nationality: Russian (naturalised); Ukrainian (expatriate)
- Height: 6 ft 2 in (188 cm)
- Weight: 254 lb (115 kg; 18 st 2 lb)
- Division: Heavyweight; Light heavyweight Middleweight
- Reach: 80 in (203 cm)
- Style: Combat Sambo, Brazilian Jiu-Jitsu
- Fighting out of: Moscow, Russia
- Team: K-Dojo Warrior Tribe (current); American Top Team (current); Team Oplot (founder); Red Devil Sport Club (former)
- Rank: International Master of Sports in Combat Sambo; 4th degree black belt in Jujutsu; Black belt in Brazilian Jiu-Jitsu
- Years active: 1996-2023, 2025-present

Mixed martial arts record
- Total: 81
- Wins: 62
- By knockout: 8
- By submission: 49
- By decision: 5
- Losses: 18
- By knockout: 10
- By submission: 2
- By decision: 6
- Draws: 1

Other information
- University: Kharkiv Polytechnic Institute
- Mixed martial arts record from Sherdog

Aleksei Alexeyevich Oleinik (born June 25, 1977, as Oleksíy Oleksíyovych Olíynyk) is a retired Russian mixed martial artist and combat sambo practitioner. He most notably fought for the Ultimate Fighting Championship, competing in their heavyweight division. A professional mixed martial artist since 1997, he has also competed for M-1 Global, ProFC, IAFC, Bellator FC, KSW and YAMMA Pit Fighting. He is one of only two fighters to win a UFC fight via Ezekiel choke, and has done so twice. Oleinik also holds the record for most Ezekiel choke wins in MMA competition, with fourteen.

== Grappling career ==
During his training camp with K-Dojo Warrior Tribe in April 2011, Oleinik participated in two Grappling tournaments, he won the Absolute division in an Eddie Alvarez hosted grappling tournament, and also won the Men's black belt No-Gi Advanced Super weight (210 lbs and over) division in the Grapplers Quest "Beast of the East 2011" tournament.

Oleinik made his return to grappling in a superfight against multiple-time World Champion Gordon Ryan on December 12, 2019 at Quintet: Ultra. He lost the match quickly by kneebar.

== Mixed martial arts career ==
Oleinik originally started MMA to prove himself to be strong. “I just wanted to prove to myself and others that I could be strong, to protect yourself and others. Then, it turned out that I do it very well, and became my profession.”

Oleinik represented Russia for the Imperial Team in the M-1 Challenge 2009 season, where he defeated Sang Soo Lee. Alexey has highly regarded submission grappling skills which he developed from his background in training in traditional Japanese jujutsu and competition in Combat Sambo. He fought Robin Gracie trained Spanish BJJ black belt Rogent Lloret in a fight that ended in a draw. After his loss to Chris Tuchscherer he went 12 fights without a loss. That streak came to a halt when he lost via TKO in the first round against Michal Kita at the ProFC Heavyweight Grand Prix 2009.

=== Bellator MMA ===
In the summer of 2010, under the tutelage of K-Dojo Head Coach Murat Keshtov, Oleinik participated in the inaugural heavyweight tournament for Bellator Fighting Championships. He faced Mike Hayes in the opening round and won the match via a split decision.

In his next bout, he was stopped in the semi-finals by Neil Grove. He lost via TKO, the referee stopped the fight at 0:45 of the opening round.

=== Ultimate Fighting Championship ===
==== 2014 ====
In November 2013 Oleinik announced that he signed a contract with the UFC, and was expected to face Jared Rosholt on January 25, 2014, at UFC on Fox 10. However, Oleinik was forced out of the bout with an injury and Rosholt was pulled from the card altogether.

In his debut, Oleinik faced fellow newcomer Anthony Hamilton on June 28, 2014, at UFC Fight Night: Swanson vs. Stephens. He won the fight via scarf hold headlock submission early in the first round.

The rescheduled bout with Jared Rosholt took place on November 22, 2014, at UFC Fight Night 57. Oleinik won the fight via knockout in the first round. The win also earned Oleinik his first Performance of the Night bonus award.

==== 2015 ====
In an interview on September 9, 2015, Oleinik indicated that he had been sidelined by multiple knee surgeries and subsequent rehabilitation. Oleinik said he has no intention of retiring and expects a possible return sometime in the middle of 2016.

==== 2016 ====
Oleinik next faced Daniel Omielańczuk on July 13, 2016, at UFC Fight Night 91. He lost the fight via majority decision.

==== 2017 ====
Oleinik next faced Viktor Pešta on January 15, 2017, at UFC Fight Night 103. He won the fight in the first round via Ezekiel choke, the first in UFC history and was awarded a Performance of the Night bonus. In unbelievable circumstances, it was executed while in Pešta's "full mount" position, where it is very rarely seen executed without the usage of a 'gi. However, the Ezekiel choke technique was not new to Oleinik, who had already won 12 fights by the same submission earlier in his career.

Oleinik faced Travis Browne on July 8, 2017, at UFC 213. He dropped Browne with a right hook in the first round and showed his superior grappling when he won the fight via submission, due to a rear-naked choke (with a modified grip and without a complete full back mount) in the second round.

Oleinik faced Curtis Blaydes on November 4, 2017, at UFC 217. The referee stopped the fight in the second round after Blaydes delivered an illegal kick to a downed opponent and called a doctor to check on Oleinik. The fight was stopped due to the doctor's advice. The replay, however, showed the strike did not deliver significant damage (as it only grazed the ear), and the fight was ruled a TKO win for Blaydes.

==== 2018 ====
Oleinik faced Júnior Albini on May 12, 2018, at UFC 224. He won the fight in the first round via Ezekiel choke, marking his second win via this rare choke in the UFC. This win earned him the Performance of the Night award.

Oleinik was briefly linked to a bout with Fabrício Werdum on September 15, 2018, at UFC Fight Night 136. However, on May 22, Werdum was flagged for a potential USADA doping violation, and was later suspended for 2 years. Oleinik instead faced Mark Hunt on the card. He won the fight via rear-naked choke submission in the first round. This marked Oleinik's 45th submission win in his MMA career. This win earned him the Performance of the Night award.

==== 2019 ====
Oleinik was expected to face Walt Harris on May 4, 2019, at UFC Fight Night 150. On April 3, 2019 news surfaced that he was withdrawn from the bout in order to headline UFC Fight Night: Volkov vs. Overeem against Alistair Overeem after Alexander Volkov had to withdraw.

Oleinik faced Alistair Overeem on 20 April 2019 at UFC Fight Night 149, replacing Alexander Volkov. He lost the fight via technical knockout in round one.

The bout between Oleinik and Walt Harris rescheduled for July 20, 2019, at UFC on ESPN 4. He lost the fight via knockout in the first round.

==== 2020 ====
Oleinik faced Maurice Greene on January 18, 2020, at UFC 246. He won the fight via a submission in the second round. This win earned him a Performance of the Night award. As a result, Oleinik became the first in history both to compete and secure a victory in an MMA fight across four different decades (1990s, 2000s, 2010s, 2020s).

Oleinik was scheduled to face Fabrício Werdum on May 9, 2020, at UFC 250. However, on April 9, Dana White, the president of UFC announced that this event was postponed and the bout eventually took place on May 9, 2020 at UFC 249. Oleinik won the fight by split decision.

When he announced he was taking another fight, Oleinik "received a message in a bottle" on the beach of Miami, signed his contract, and sent it back to Dana White and Mick Maynard. When asked if Oleinik planned on retiring any time soon, he jokingly responded that he has "only 10 years left." Ahead of his fight with Lewis, Oleinik parted ways with his long-time management company representatives, First Round Management. He stated that he wanted a manager that would focus on all fighters, not just the top two or three fighters in their stable.

Oleinik faced Derrick Lewis on August 8, 2020, at UFC Fight Night 174. He lost the fight via technical knockout in round two.

==== 2021 ====
Oleinik faced Chris Daukaus on February 20, 2021, at UFC Fight Night: Blaydes vs. Lewis. He lost the fight via technical knockout in round one.

Oleinik faced Serghei Spivac on June 19, 2021, at UFC on ESPN 25. He lost the bout via unanimous decision.

==== 2022 ====
Oleinik was scheduled to face Greg Hardy on January 22, 2022, at UFC 270. However, Oleinik withdrew from the event for undisclosed reasons and he was replaced by Sergey Spivak.

Oleinik was scheduled to face Ilir Latifi on March 26, 2022, at UFC Fight Night 205. However, the day of the event, Latifi withdrew due to illness and the bout was cancelled. The pair was rescheduled to meet on two weeks later at UFC 273 on April 9, 2022. In turn, Latifi withdrew again for unknown reasons and was replaced by Jared Vanderaa. He won the bout via scarf hold submission in the first round. The win also earned him the Performance of the Night award.

The match with Ilir Latifi was yet to rescheduled again for UFC Fight Night 211 on October 1, 2022. Oleinik lost the bout via unanimous decision.

On October 10, 2022, it was announced that Oleinik was a free agent after completing his UFC contract.

=== Post UFC ===
Oleinik faced Oli Thompson at REN TV Fight Club: Oleinik vs. Thompson on May 26, 2023, and lost via knock out in the first round.

On December 11, 2024, it was announced that Oleninik was signed by Global Fight League. However, events for this organization never materialized.

In June 2026, Oleinik announced he would have his final mixed martial arts fight on July 11, 2026. He faced Antonio Zovak at Open FC 67 and won via his patented Ezekiel choke submission in the first round.

== Bare-knuckle boxing ==
Oleinik made his Bare Knuckle Fighting Championship debut against Gerônimo dos Santos on April 4, 2025 at BKFC 71 Dubai: Day 1. He lost the fight by knockout late into the first round.

== Personal life ==
Oleinik and his ex-wife have 5 children. He and his family moved to Florida in December 2016. The eldest, Polina, attended Stoneman Douglas High School, and was present at the school during the mass shooting but was unharmed. As of March 2025, Oleinik is divorced and stated that his ex-wife took everything including his kids and property after the divorce.

He is a naturalised Russian citizen, and expressed support towards Russia following its 2014 military intervention in Ukraine. He wore a shirt with Putin's face and as a result was denied entry into Ukraine.

== Championships and accomplishments ==
=== Mixed martial arts ===
- Ultimate Fighting Championship
  - Performance of the Night (Six times) vs. Jared Rosholt, Viktor Pesta, Júnior Albini, Mark Hunt, Maurice Greene, and Jared Vanderaa
  - First fighter in UFC history to finish with an Ezekiel choke.
  - Most Ezekiel choke submissions in UFC history (2).
  - Second most submission wins in UFC Heavyweight division history (7)
  - Third most submission attempts in UFC Heavyweight division history (15)
  - Second most submissions-per-15 minutes in UFC Heavyweight division history (1.95)
  - UFC.com Awards
    - 2017: Ranked #2 Submission of the Year vs. Viktor Pesta & Half-Year Awards: Best Submission of the 1HY vs. Viktor Pešta
    - 2018: Ranked #4 Submission of the Year vs. Junior Albini
- Konfrontacja Sztuk Walki
  - 2007 KSW 8 Heavyweight Tournament Winner
- M-1 Global
  - 2004 Middleweight Russia Cup Tournament Winner
- ProFC
  - 2008 ProFC 4 President's Cup Heavyweight Tournament Winner
  - 2008 ProFC 3 Heavyweight Grand Prix Runner-Up
- International Absolute Fighting Council
  - 2006 Russia Cup Light heavyweight Tournament Winner
  - 2009 Mayor's Cup Heavyweight Tournament Winner
- Perm Region MMA Federation
  - 2007 Professional MMA Cup Heavyweight Tournament Winner
- Other tournaments
  - 2007 Yaroslavl Open Championship Heavyweight Tournament Winner
  - 1996 Minamoto Cup Heavyweight Tournament Winner
- World Cup of Mixed Martial Arts
  - WCMMA Heavyweight Championship (One time; first; last)
- MMA Mania
  - 2017 Submission of the Year (Top 5: #2) vs. Viktor Pešta
- MMA Weekly
  - 2018 Submission of the Year vs. Júnior Albini
- Bleacher Report
  - 2018 Submission of the Year vs. Júnior Albini at UFC 224
- MMA Junkie
  - 2017 #4 Ranked Submission of the Year vs. Viktor Pešta at UFC Fight Night: Rodríguez vs. Penn

=== Combat sambo ===
- World Combat Sambo Federation
  - World Combat Sambo Champion (2005)
  - Eurasian Combat Sambo Champion (2001)
- Combat Sambo Federation of Russia
  - Russian Combat Sambo Champion (2003, 2004)
  - Moscow Combat Sambo Champion (Five time)

=== Submission grappling ===
- Grapplers Quest
  - 2011 Black belt No-Gi Advanced Superweight (210 lbs ) Tournament Winner
- Eddie Alvarez Grappling Tournament
  - 2011 Absolute Division Tournament Winner

=== Records ===
- First fighter to compete across four different decades (1990s, 2000s, 2010s, 2020s)
- First fighter to secure a victory across four different decades (1990s, 2000s, 2010s, 2020s)

== Mixed martial arts record ==
Professional record breakdown
81 matches	62 wins	18 losses
By knockout	8	10
By submission	49	2
By decision	5	6
Draws	1	

Res.	Record	Opponent	Method	Event	Date	Round	Time	Location	Notes
Win	62–18–1	Antonio Zovak	Submission (Ezekiel choke)	Open FC 67	July 11, 2026	1	1:03	Moscow, Russia	
Win	61–18–1	Fernando Rodrigues Jr.	Submission (arm-triangle choke)	RCC 17	December 15, 2023	2	2:27	Yekaterinburg, Russia	
Loss	60–18–1	Oli Thompson	KO (punch)	REN TV Fight Club: Oleinik vs. Thompson	May 26, 2023	1	2:25	Moscow, Russia	
Loss	60–17–1	Ilir Latifi	Decision (unanimous)	UFC Fight Night: Dern vs. Yan	October 1, 2022	3	5:00	Las Vegas, Nevada, United States	
Win	60–16–1	Jared Vanderaa	Submission (scarf hold)	UFC 273	April 9, 2022	1	3:39	Jacksonville, Florida, United States	Performance of the Night.
Loss	59–16–1	Serghei Spivac	Decision (unanimous)	UFC on ESPN: The Korean Zombie vs. Ige	June 19, 2021	3	5:00	Las Vegas, Nevada, United States	
Loss	59–15–1	Chris Daukaus	TKO (punches)	UFC Fight Night: Blaydes vs. Lewis	February 20, 2021	1	1:55	Las Vegas, Nevada, United States	
Loss	59–14–1	Derrick Lewis	TKO (punches)	UFC Fight Night: Lewis vs. Oleinik	August 8, 2020	2	0:21	Las Vegas, Nevada, United States	
Win	59–13–1	Fabrício Werdum	Decision (split)	UFC 249	May 9, 2020	3	5:00	Jacksonville, Florida, United States	
Win	58–13–1	Maurice Greene	Submission (armbar)	UFC 246	January 18, 2020	2	4:38	Las Vegas, Nevada, United States	Performance of the Night.
Loss	57–13–1	Walt Harris	KO (knee and punches)	UFC on ESPN: dos Anjos vs. Edwards	July 20, 2019	1	0:12	San Antonio, Texas, United States	
Loss	57–12–1	Alistair Overeem	TKO (punches)	UFC Fight Night: Overeem vs. Oleinik	April 20, 2019	1	4:45	Saint Petersburg, Russia	
Win	57–11–1	Mark Hunt	Submission (rear-naked choke)	UFC Fight Night: Hunt vs. Oleinik	September 15, 2018	1	4:26	Moscow, Russia	Performance of the Night.
Win	56–11–1	Júnior Albini	Submission (Ezekiel choke)	UFC 224	May 12, 2018	1	1:45	Rio de Janeiro, Brazil	Performance of the Night.
Loss	55–11–1	Curtis Blaydes	TKO (doctor stoppage)	UFC 217	November 4, 2017	2	1:56	New York City, New York, United States	
Win	55–10–1	Travis Browne	Submission (neck crank)	UFC 213	July 8, 2017	2	3:44	Las Vegas, Nevada, United States	
Win	54–10–1	Viktor Pešta	Submission (ezekiel choke)	UFC Fight Night: Rodríguez vs. Penn	January 15, 2017	1	2:57	Phoenix, Arizona, United States	Performance of the Night.
Loss	53–10–1	Daniel Omielańczuk	Decision (majority)	UFC Fight Night: McDonald vs. Lineker	July 13, 2016	3	5:00	Sioux Falls, South Dakota, United States	
Win	53–9–1	Jared Rosholt	KO (punches)	UFC Fight Night: Edgar vs. Swanson	November 22, 2014	1	3:21	Austin, Texas, United States	Performance of the Night.
Win	52–9–1	Anthony Hamilton	Submission (scarf hold)	UFC Fight Night: Swanson vs. Stephens	June 28, 2014	1	2:18	San Antonio, Texas, United States	
Win	51–9–1	Mirko Cro Cop	Submission (scarf hold)	Legend Fight Show 2	November 8, 2013	1	4:42	Moscow, Russia	
Win	50–9–1	Dion Staring	Submission (arm-triangle choke)	ProFC 50	October 16, 2013	1	1:41	Rostov, Russia	
Win	49–9–1	Jeff Monson	Submission (rear-naked choke)	Oplot Challenge 54	June 20, 2013	2	2:12	Kharkiv, Ukraine	
Win	48–9–1	Tony Lopez	Submission (triangle choke)	Oplot Challenge 53	April 20, 2013	3	3:19	Kharkiv, Ukraine	
Win	47–9–1	Leo Pla	TKO (punches)	Oplot Challenge 43	March 16, 2013	1	2:56	Kharkiv, Ukraine	
Win	46–9–1	Martin Hudey	Submission (rear-naked choke)	Oplot Challenge 12	November 10, 2012	1	1:48	Kharkiv, Ukraine	
Win	45–9–1	Mike Stewart	Submission (Ezekiel choke)	WCMMA 1	September 15, 2012	2	1:03	Ledyard, Connecticut, United States	Won the vacant WCMMA Heavyweight Championship.
Win	44–9–1	Jerry Otto	Submission (ezekiel choke)	Oplot Challenge 2	May 13, 2012	1	2:20	Kharkiv, Ukraine	
Win	43–9–1	Sergey Terezinov	Submission (armbar)	Oplot Challenge 1	March 25, 2012	1	1:05	Moscow, Russia	
Loss	42–9–1	Jeff Monson	Decision (split)	M-1 Challenge 31	March 16, 2012	3	5:00	Moscow, Russia	
Loss	42–8–1	Magomed Malikov	TKO (punches)	Fight Star: Oleg Taktarov Cup 2011	July 22, 2011	1	2:39	Anapa, Russia	
Win	42–7–1	Ernest Kostanyan	Submission (rear-naked choke)	Razdolie Cup 2011	June 26, 2011	1	1:22	Moscow, Russia	
Loss	41–7–1	Neil Grove	TKO (punches)	Bellator 29	September 16, 2010	1	0:45	Milwaukee, Wisconsin, United States	Bellator Season Three Heavyweight Tournament Semifinal.
Win	41–6–1	Mike Hayes	Decision (split)	Bellator 26	August 26, 2010	3	5:00	Kansas City, Missouri, United States	Bellator Season Three Heavyweight Tournament Opening round.
Loss	40–6–1	Michał Kita	TKO (punches)	Union of Veterans: Cup of Champions 2009	November 28, 2009	1	1:17	Saint Petersburg, Russia	IAFC Mayor's Cup Heavyweight Tournament Final.
Win	40–5–1	Thiago dos Santos	Submission (Ezekiel choke)	Union of Veterans: Cup of Champions 2009	November 28, 2009	1	4:22	Saint Petersburg, Russia	IAFC Mayor's Cup Heavyweight Tournament Semifinal.
Win	39–5–1	Eddy Bengtsson	TKO (submission to punches)	Union of Veterans: Cup of Champions 2009	November 28, 2009	2	1:55	Saint Petersburg, Russia	IAFC Mayor's Cup Heavyweight Tournament Quarterfinal.
Draw	38–5–1	Rogent Lloret	Draw (unanimous)	M-1 Global: Breakthrough	August 28, 2009	3	5:00	Kansas City, Missouri, United States	
Win	38–5	Lee Sang-soo	Submission (Ezekiel choke)	M-1 Challenge 12	February 21, 2009	2	4:27	Tacoma, Washington, United States	
Win	37–5	Jessie Gibbs	Submission (ezekiel choke)	M-1 Challenge 11	January 11, 2009	2	3:42	Amstelveen, Netherlands	
Win	36–5	Islam Dadalov	TKO (punches)	ProFC 4: President's Cup	October 25, 2008	1	2:33	Grozny, Russia	Won the ProFC President's Cup Heavyweight Tournament.
Win	35–5	Abdülhalik Magomedov	Submission (heel hook)	ProFC 4: President's Cup	October 25, 2008	1	0:48	Grozny, Russia	ProFC President's Cup Heavyweight Tournament Semifinal.
Win	34–5	Telman Sherifov	Submission (guillotine choke)	ProFC 3: Heavyweight Grand Prix	October 4, 2008	1	1:25	Saint Petersburg, Russia	Won the ProFC Heavyweight Grand Prix.
Win	33–5	Oleg Kutepov	Submission (inverted armbar)	ProFC 3: Heavyweight Grand Prix	October 4, 2008	1	1:21	Saint Petersburg, Russia	ProFC Heavyweight Grand Prix Semifinal.
Win	32–5	Magomedbag Agaev	Submission (scarf hold)	ProFC 3: Heavyweight Grand Prix	October 4, 2008	1	3:47	Saint Petersburg, Russia	ProFC Heavyweight Grand Prix Quarterfinal.
Loss	31–5	Konstantyn Stryzhak	TKO (punches)	CSFU: Champions League	September 13, 2008	1	4:20	Poltava, Ukraine	
Win	31–4	Makasharip Makasharipov	Decision (unanimous)	CSFU: Champions League	September 13, 2008	3	5:00	Poltava, Ukraine	
Win	30–4	Alexander Timonov	Submission (ezekiel choke)	M-1 Challenge 4	June 27, 2008	1	1:09	Saint Petersburg, Russia	
Win	29–4	Daniel Dowda	Decision (unanimous)	KSW 9	May 9, 2008	2	5:00	Warsaw, Poland	Catchweight (209 lb) bout.
Loss	28–4	Chris Tuchscherer	Decision (unanimous)	YAMMA Pit Fighting 1	April 11, 2008	1	5:00	Atlantic City, New Jersey, United States	YAMMA Heavyweight Tournament Semifinal.
Win	28–3	Sherman Pendergarst	Submission (Ezekiel choke)	YAMMA Pit Fighting 1	April 11, 2008	1	4:18	Atlantic City, New Jersey, United States	YAMMA Middleweight Tournament Quarterfinal.
Win	27–3	Gela Getsadze	TKO (punches)	Yaroslavl Open Championship 2007	December 14, 2007	1	1:48	Yaroslavl, Russia	Won the Yaroslavl Open Cup Heavyweight Tournament.
Win	26–3	Ishkhan Zakharian	Submission (armbar)	Yaroslavl Open Championship 2007	December 14, 2007	1	2:56	Yaroslavl, Russia	Yaroslavl Open Cup Heavyweight Tournament Semifinal.
Win	25–3	Andrey Oleinik	Submission (heel hook)	Yaroslavl Open Championship 2007	December 14, 2007	1	1:30	Yaroslavl, Russia	Return to Heavyweight. Yaroslavl Open Cup Heavyweight Tournament Quarterfinal.
Win	24–3	Timur Gasanov	Submission (ezekiel choke)	Perm Region MMA Federation: Cup of Professional MMA 2007	November 23, 2007	1	1:19	Perm, Russia	Won the 2007 Perm MMA Middleweight Tournament.
Win	23–3	Alavutdin Gadzhiyev	Submission (ezekiel choke)	Perm Region MMA Federation: Cup of Professional MMA 2007	November 23, 2007	1	0:46	Perm, Russia	2007 Perm MMA Middleweight Tournament Semifinal.
Win	22–3	Adlan Amagov	Submission (ezekiel choke)	Perm Region MMA Federation: Cup of Professional MMA 2007	November 23, 2007	1	1:00	Perm, Russia	Return to Middleweight. 2007 Perm MMA Middleweight Tournament Quarterfinal.
Win	21–3	Krzysztof Kułak	Submission (ezekiel choke)	KSW 8	November 10, 2007	1	2:50	Warsaw, Poland	Won the KSW 8 Openweight Tournament.
Win	20–3	Karol Bedorf	Submission (triangle choke)	KSW 8	November 10, 2007	1	1:03	Warsaw, Poland	KSW 8 Openweight Tournament Semifinal.
Win	19–3	Łukasz Woś	Submission (rear-naked choke)	KSW 8	November 10, 2007	1	0:50	Warsaw, Poland	KSW 8 Openweight Tournament Quarterfinal.
Win	18–3	Shamil Nurmagomedov	Submission (neck crank)	Legion Fight 1	October 20, 2007	1	N/A	Rostov-on-Don, Russia	
Loss	17–3	Chael Sonnen	Decision (unanimous)	BodogFight: USA vs. Russia 2006	December 2, 2006	3	5:00	Vancouver, British Columbia, Canada	
Win	17–2	Ishkhan Zakharian	Submission (triangle choke)	Legion Fight: Black Sea Cup 2006 (Stage 3)	August 15, 2006	1	1:21	Anapa, Russia	Light Heavyweight debut.
Win	16–2	Vladimir Rudakov	Submission (triangle choke)	Union of Veterans: Cup of Champions 2006	April 14, 2006	1	2:41	Novosibirsk, Russia	Won the IAFC Pankration Russia Cup.
Win	15–2	Magomed Sultanakhmedov	Submission (Ezekiel choke)	Union of Veterans: Cup of Champions 2006	April 14, 2006	1	0:35	Novosibirsk, Russia	IAFC Pankration Russia Cup Semifinal.
Win	14–2	Shavkat Urakov	Submission (rear-naked choke)	Union of Veterans: Cup of Champions 2006	April 14, 2006	1	0:41	Novosibirsk, Russia	IAFC Pankration Russia Cup Quarterfinal.
Loss	13–2	Flavio Luiz Moura	Technical Submission (rear-naked choke)	M-1: Middleweight Grand Prix	October 9, 2004	1	1:11	Saint Petersburg, Russia	2004 M-1 Middleweight Grand Prix Semifinal.
Win	13–1	Marcelo Alfaya	Decision (unanimous)	M-1: Middleweight Grand Prix	October 9, 2004	2	5:00	Saint Petersburg, Russia	2004 M-1 Middleweight Grand Prix Quarterfinal.
Win	12–1	Azred Telkusheev	Submission (heel hook)	M-1: Middleweight Russia Cup	August 27, 2004	1	0:38	Saint Petersburg, Russia	Won the 2004 M-1 Middleweight Russia Cup.
Win	11–1	Ubaidula Chopolaev	Submission (rear-naked choke)	M-1: Middleweight Russia Cup	August 27, 2004	1	0:48	Saint Petersburg, Russia	2004 M-1 Middleweight Russia Cup Semifinal.
Win	10–1	Ramin Tagiev	Submission (rear-naked choke)	M-1: Middleweight Russia Cup	August 27, 2004	1	2:03	Saint Petersburg, Russia	Return to Middleweight. 2004 M-1 Middleweight Russia Cup Quarterfinal.
Win	9–1	Igor Bondarenko	Submission (rear-naked choke)	PFU: Land Of Peresvit	December 7, 2001	1	2:03	Kyiv, Ukraine	Won the 2001 PFU Heavyweight Tournament.
Win	8–1	Gennadiy Matsigora	Submission (triangle choke)	PFU: Land Of Peresvit	December 7, 2001	1	2:25	Kyiv, Ukraine	Return to Heavyweight. 2001 PFU Heavyweight Tournament Semifinal.
Win	7–1	Gennadiy Matsigora	Submission (armbar)	InterPride 1999	May 16, 1999	1	2:03	Kharkiv, Ukraine	Won the InterPride Middleweight Tournament.
Win	6–1	Vladimir Malyshev	TKO (punches)	InterPride 1999	May 16, 1999	1	2:30	Kharkiv, Ukraine	Middleweight debut. InterPride Middleweight Tournament Semifinal.
Win	5–1	Clarence Thatch	TKO (submission to punches)	International Super Challenge 1998	March 16, 1998	1	3:43	Kyiv, Ukraine	
Loss	4–1	Leonid Efremov	Submission (rear-naked choke)	IAFC: Absolute FC 2	April 30, 1997	1	2:48	Moscow, Russia	IAFC Heavyweight Tournament Semifinal.
Win	4–0	Igor Akinin	Submission (guillotine choke)	IAFC: Absolute FC 2	April 30, 1997	1	N/A	Moscow, Russia	IAFC Heavyweight Tournament Quarterfinal.
Win	3–0	Artem Kondratko	Submission (rear-naked choke)	Minamoto Cup 1996	November 10, 1996	1	4:09	Kharkiv, Ukraine	Won the 1996 Minamoto Cup Heavyweight Tournament.
Win	2–0	Sergey Zalikhvatko	TKO (punches)	Minamoto Cup 1996	November 10, 1996	1	1:52	Kharkiv, Ukraine	1996 Minamoto Cup Heavyweight Tournament Semifinal.
Win	1–0	Alexandr Kruglenko	Submission (rear-naked choke)	Minamoto Cup 1996	November 10, 1996	1	3:06	Kharkiv, Ukraine	Heavyweight debut. 1996 Minamoto Cup Heavyweight Tournament Quarterfinal.

== Professional boxing record ==
1 fight	1 win	0 losses
By knockout	1	0

No.	Result	Record	Opponent	Type	Round, time	Date	Location	Notes
1	Win	1–0	Takhir Dzablaev	TKO	1 (8), 0:34	Aug 26, 2023	Pyramide, Kazan, Russia	

== Bare knuckle boxing record ==
Professional record breakdown
1 match	0 wins	1 loss
By knockout	0	1

Res.	Record	Opponent	Method	Event	Date	Round	Time	Location	Notes
Loss	0–1	Gerônimo dos Santos	KO	BKFC 71 Dubai: Day 1	April 4, 2025	1	1:49	Dubai, United Arab Emirates	

== See also ==
- List of male mixed martial artists
