= UFC 224 =

UFC mixed martial arts event in 2018

UFC 224: Nunes vs. Pennington
- The poster for UFC 224: Nunes vs. Pennington
- Promotion: Ultimate Fighting Championship
- Date: May 12, 2018
- Venue: Jeunesse Arena
- City: Rio de Janeiro, Brazil
- Attendance: 10,696
- Buyrate: 85,000

Event chronology
UFC Fight Night: Barboza vs. Lee	UFC 224: Nunes vs. Pennington	UFC Fight Night: Maia vs. Usman

UFC 224: Nunes vs. Pennington was a mixed martial arts event produced by the Ultimate Fighting Championship that was held on May 12, 2018, at the Jeunesse Arena in Rio de Janeiro, Brazil.

== Background ==
The UFC was initially targeting a UFC Women's Featherweight Championship bout between the current champion Cris Cyborg and the current UFC Women's Bantamweight Champion Amanda Nunes to take place at this event and potentially serve as the headliner. However, Cyborg was instead scheduled for a title defense at UFC 222 in March, and the plans were scrapped. In turn, it was announced on February 23 that Raquel Pennington would instead face Nunes for the bantamweight title.

A light heavyweight bout between former UFC Light Heavyweight Championship title challengers Volkan Oezdemir and Glover Teixeira was briefly linked to take place at the event. However, Oezdemir was pulled from that pairing in favor of a matchup with former UFC Light Heavyweight Champion Maurício Rua the following week at UFC Fight Night: Maia vs. Usman.

At the weigh-ins, Mackenzie Dern weighed in at 123 pounds, seven pounds over the strawweight non-title fight upper limit of 116 pounds. As a result, the bout proceeded at catchweight, and Dern was fined 30% of her purse which went to her opponent Amanda Cooper.

== Results ==
Main Card
Weight class				Method	Round	Time	Notes
Women's Bantamweight	Amanda Nunes (c)	def.	Raquel Pennington	TKO (punches)	5	2:36	(Note: For the UFC Women's Bantamweight Championship.)
Middleweight	Kelvin Gastelum	def.	Ronaldo Souza	Decision (split) (29–28, 28–29, 29–28)	3	5:00
Catchweight (123 lb)	Mackenzie Dern	def.	Amanda Cooper	Submission (rear naked choke)	1	2:27
Bantamweight	John Lineker	def.	Brian Kelleher	KO (punch)	3	3:43
Middleweight	Lyoto Machida	def.	Vitor Belfort	KO (front kick)	2	1:00
Preliminary Card (FX)
Middleweight	Cezar Ferreira	def.	Karl Roberson	Technical Submission (arm-triangle choke)	1	4:45
Heavyweight	Aleksei Oleinik	def.	Júnior Albini	Submission (Ezekiel choke)	1	1:45
Lightweight	Davi Ramos	def.	Nick Hein	Submission (rear-naked choke)	1	4:15
Welterweight	Elizeu Zaleski dos Santos	def.	Sean Strickland	KO (spinning wheel kick and punches)	1	3:40
Preliminary Card (UFC Fight Pass)
Welterweight	Warlley Alves	def.	Sultan Aliev	TKO (doctor stoppage)	2	5:00
Middleweight	Jack Hermansson	def.	Thales Leites	TKO (punches)	3	2:10
Welterweight	Ramazan Emeev	def.	Alberto Mina	Decision (unanimous) (30–27, 30–27, 30–27)	3	5:00
Middleweight	Markus Perez	def.	James Bochnovic	Submission (rear-naked choke)	1	4:28

== Bonus awards ==
The following fighters were awarded $50,000 bonuses:

- Fight of the Night: Kelvin Gastelum vs. Ronaldo Souza
- Performance of the Night: Lyoto Machida and Aleksei Oleinyk

== Aftermath ==
This event tied the record, with UFC Fight Night: Rockhold vs. Bisping, UFC 281, UFC Fight Night: Imavov vs. Borralho and UFC 329 for having the most finishes on a single modern UFC card with 11 finishes. The record was ultimately surpassed in August 2026 when UFC Fight Night: Medić vs. Rodriguez recorded twelve finishes.

== See also ==
- List of UFC events
- List of current UFC fighters
- 2018 in UFC
