= Cam F. Awesome =

American boxer (born 1988)

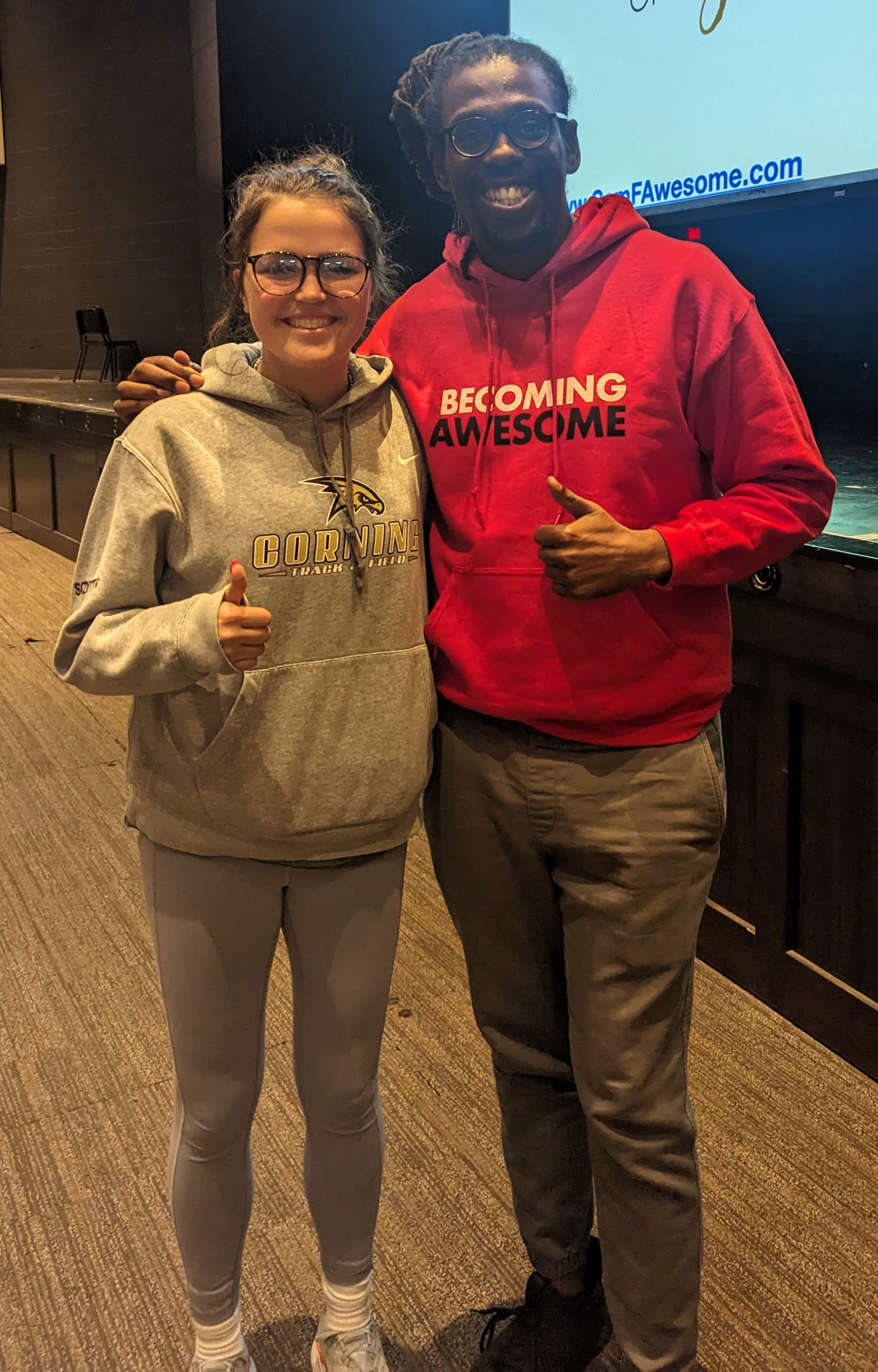
- Awesome (right) with a student during a motivational talk, November 2023

Personal information
- Born: Lenroy Thompson; 6 August 1988 (age 38) Uniondale, New York, United States
- Website: https://camfawesome.com/

Sport
- Sport: Boxing
Medal record
Representing the United States
Pan American Games
Bronze medal – third place	2015 Toronto	Super heavyweight

Cam F. Awesome (born August 6, 1988 in Uniondale, New York), formerly known as Lenroy Thompson, is an American amateur boxer best known for winning the US title in 2008, 2010, 2013 and 2014 and the Golden Gloves in 2009, 2011 and 2013 at super heavyweight.

He is featured in the 2017 Netflix boxing documentary, Counter Punch. He frequently fights in pink to show his commitment to and involvement with the Breast Cancer Awareness Program. Awesome is the U.S. National Team Captain and is also the Athlete Director on USA Boxing Board of Directors. He is a vegan since 2012 and promotes the lifestyle.

== Amateur boxing career ==
Awesome is a Southpaw that fights with a counterpuncher style. He first started boxing in 2005 to lose weight. A few months later he moved to Port St. Lucie, Florida, where he continued to box for Fort Pierce P.A.L. and won 18 consecutive matches in the super heavyweight class.

Awesome won the 2008 Golden Gloves, he won them again in 2011. He also won the U.S. National Championships in 2008, he won them again in 2010. In 2011,Awesome won the US Olympic trials in Mobile, by winning he qualified as the U.S. Olympic team’s Super Heavyweight boxer. Awesome competed in the AIBA World Championships in Baku, defeating Alexey Mukhin, before to Viktar Zuyev in Round Three. He also competed in the Olympic test event, losing in the Semifinals to Evgenios Lazaridis. In 2012, he was suspended for a year by the United States Anti-Doping Agency for multiple failures to provide his location in order to be available for drug testing. On his return from the suspension, he legally changed his name to "Cam F. Awesome" and resumed his pursuit of the 2016 Olympic Games in Rio de Janeiro, where he became a leading frontrunner to represent the United States as a super-heavyweight. He lost to Lenier Pero at the 2015 Pan American Games but was noted for his energetic performance during the bout and in post-fight interviews, where he gained attention for calling himself "the Taylor Swift of boxing".

At the U.S. Olympic team trials in December 2015, he won the 201-pound weight class. However, due to his international ranking, this only qualified him for the 2016 APB and WSB Olympic Qualifier where he was eliminated in the quarterfinals. Awesome fought Trevor Bryan, Lawrence Okolie, Guido Vianello, Frazer Clarke, Michael Hunter, Lenier Peró, and Dominic Breazeale

He lives and trains in Lenexa, Kansas.

Boxing record 326-30

Pan American Games results

2015 Pan American Games

- Defeated Simon Kean (Canada) 2:1
- Lost to Lenier Peró (Cuba) 1:2

World Championship results

2011 AIBA World Boxing Championships

- Defeated Alexey Mukhin (Australia) 18:9
- Lost to Viktar Zuyev (Belarus) 18:15

== See also ==
- List of vegans
