= Boxing at the 2015 Pan American Games – Men's super heavyweight =

Men's Super heavyweight at the 2015 Pan American Games
- Venue: Oshawa Sports Centre
- Dates: July 19–25
- Competitors: 8 from 8 nations

Medalists
Gold medal	Lenier Pero	Cuba
Silver medal	Edgar Muñoz	Venezuela
Bronze medal	Cam Awesome	United States
Bronze medal	Rafael Lima	Brazil

The super heavyweight competition of the boxing events at the 2015 Pan American Games in Toronto, Ontario, Canada, was held between the 19 and 25 of July at the Oshawa Sports Centre. The defending champion is Italo Perea of Ecuador. Super heavyweights is limited to those boxers weighing greater than 91 kilograms.

Like all Pan American boxing events, the competition is a straight single-elimination tournament. Both semifinal losers are awarded bronze medals, so no boxers compete again after their first loss. Bouts consist of a 3 rounds "10-point must" scoring system used in the pro game, where the winner of each round must be awarded 10 points and the loser a lesser amount, and the elimination of the padded headgear. Five judges scored each bout. The winner will be the boxer who scored the most at the end of the match.

== Qualification ==
A total of eight boxers qualified to compete.

== Results ==
=== Bracket ===
Quarterfinals; July 19, 2015
Lenier Pero (CUB)	3
Kieshno Major (BAH)	0
Cam Awesome (USA)	2
Simon Kean (CAN)	1
Rafael Lima (BRA)	2
Clayton Laurent (ISV)	1
Édgar Ramírez (MEX)	0
Edgar Muñoz (VEN)	3

Semifinals; July 23, 2015
Lenier Pero (CUB)	2
Cam Awesome (USA)	1
Rafael Lima (BRA)	1
Edgar Muñoz (VEN)	2

Finals; July 25, 2015
Lenier Pero (CUB)	2
Edgar Muñoz (VEN)	1
