= Olympia Theatre (Montreal) =

Theatre and cinema in Montreal, Quebec, Canada

Coordinates: 45°31′01″N 73°33′26″W

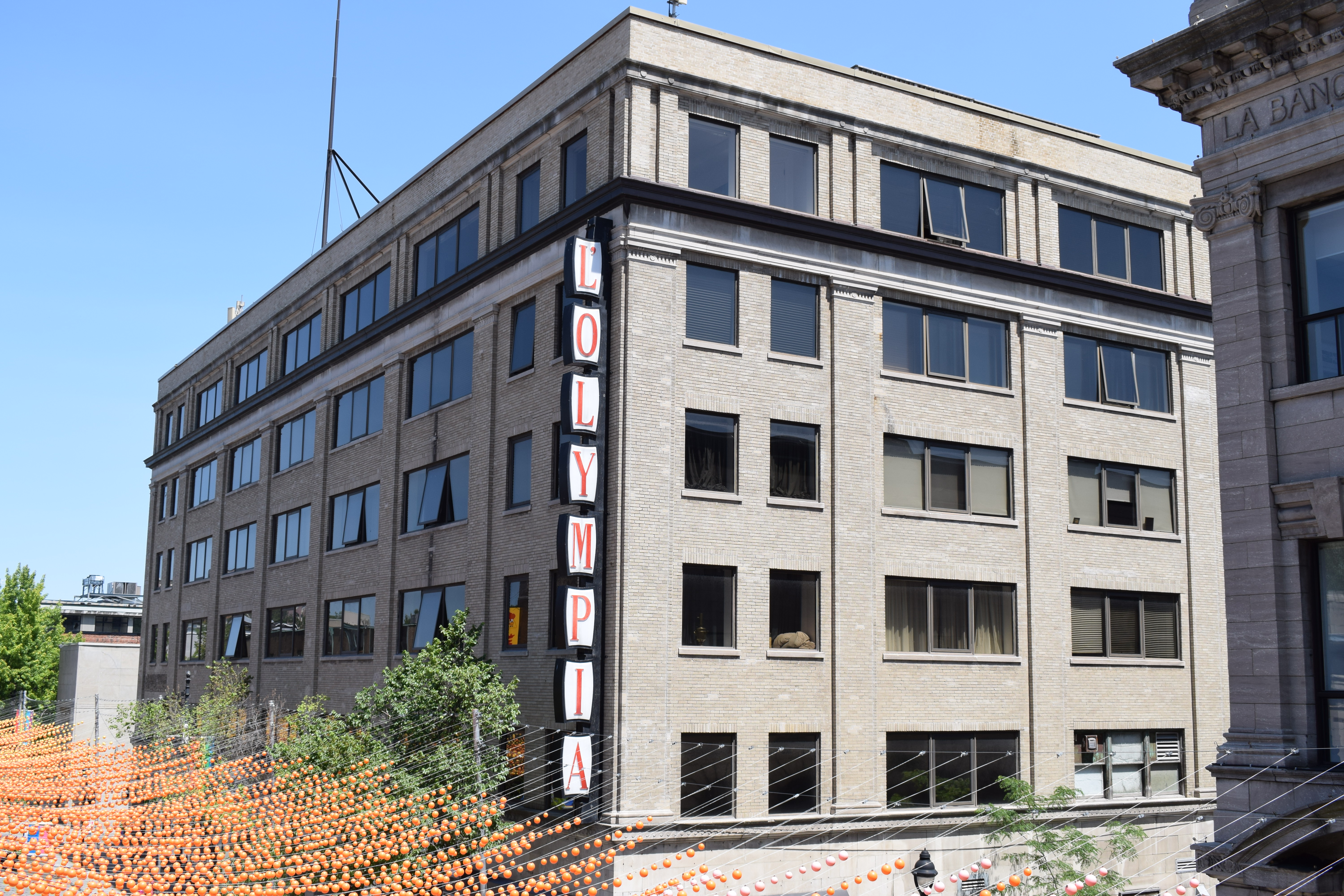
The Olympia Theatre

Olympia Theatre is an historic concert venue in Gay Village, Montreal, Quebec. Built in 1925, it is located at 1004 Saint Catherine Street East. The hall has a capacity of up to 2,438 seats.
