= Júnior Albini =

Brazilian mixed martial arts fighter

- Born: 15 March 1991 (age 35); Paranagua, Parana, Brazil
- Other names: Baby
- Height: 6 ft 3 in (1.91 m)
- Weight: 265 lb (120 kg; 18.9 st)
- Division: Heavyweight; Light Heavyweight
- Reach: 74 in (190 cm)
- Stance: Orthodox
- Fighting out of: Parnagua, Piauí, Brazil
- Team: Astra Fight Team
- Rank: Brown belt in Brazilian Jiu-Jitsu; Purple belt in Luta Livre
- Years active: 2009–present

Mixed martial arts record
- Total: 25
- Wins: 18
- By knockout: 10
- By submission: 6
- By decision: 2
- Losses: 7
- By knockout: 3
- By submission: 3
- By decision: 1

Other information
- Mixed martial arts record from Sherdog

Júnior Albini (born 15 March 1991) is a Brazilian professional mixed martial artist who competed in the Heavyweight division of the Ultimate Fighting Championship.

== Early life ==
Albini started boxing at 13 years old to lose weight. At that time he weighed over 350 lb (160 kg; 25 st).

== Mixed martial arts career ==
=== Early career ===
Albini made his professional debut in August 2009. Over the next seven years he fought fifteen times and amassed a record of 13-2; 11 of his 13 wins came by stoppage.

=== Ultimate Fighting Championship ===
Albini made his promotional debut in the UFC against 11th ranked opponent Timothy Johnson at UFC on Fox: Weidman vs. Gastelum. He won the fight via knockout in the first round. This win earned him the Performance of the Night bonus of US$50 thousand. At the post fight interview, Albini was pleased with the prize money where he stated he now was in the position to buy real toys for his daughter.

It's so much money. I've never seen that kind of money. I was never able to buy her (his daughter) a toy or something like that. All of her toys were like shampoos, empty bottles, because we didn't have much money. My wife was following my dream, too, together, so it means a lot to me right now that I can make a living and give back to them what they suffered together with me – the pursuing of this dream.

Albini faced Andrei Arlovski at UFC Fight Night: Poirier vs. Pettis on 11 November 2017. He lost the fight via unanimous decision.

Albini faced Aleksei Oleinik on 12 May 2018, at UFC 224. He lost the fight via submission in the first round.

Albini was scheduled to face Dmitry Sosnovskiy on 2 February 2019, at UFC Fight Night 144. However, Sosnovskiy pulled out of the fight in early January after undergoing surgery to correct a recent injury. Albini instead faced promotional newcomer Jairzinho Rozenstruik. He lost the fight via TKO in the second round, the first TKO loss of his MMA career.

Albini faced Maurice Greene on 29 June 2019 at UFC on ESPN 3. He lost the fight via TKO in the first round.

In January 2020, it was reported that Albini was released by UFC.

=== Post-UFC career ===
After the stint in the UFC, Albini made his first appearance against Adnan Alić at Serbian Battle Championship 27 on 14 March 2020. He won the fight via knockout less than a minute into round one.

Albini next faced Gabriel Kanabo at Warriors Combat - on 30 July 2021. He won the fight via knockout in round one.

Albini faced Davi Lucas da Silva at AFT 30 on 31 August 2021. He won the bout via TKO in round one.

== Personal life ==
Albini is married and has a daughter. Before signing with the UFC, Albini worked full-time as a security guard.

== Championships and accomplishments ==
- Ultimate Fighting Championship
  - Performance of the Night (One time) vs. Timothy Johnson
- Aspera Fighting Championship
  - Aspera FC Heavyweight Championship (One time)

== Mixed martial arts record ==
Professional record breakdown
| 26 matches | 18 wins | 8 losses |
| By knockout | 10 | 4 |
| By submission | 6 | 3 |
| By decision | 2 | 1 |

| Res. | Record | Opponent | Method | Event | Date | Round | Time | Location | Notes |
|---|---|---|---|---|---|---|---|---|---|
| Win | 18–8 | Reymond Jimenez | TKO (punches) | Gamebred Bareknuckle MMA 12 | October 2, 2026 | 1 | 3:43 | Santo Domingo, Dominican Republic | |
| Loss | 17–8 | Lucas Camacho | TKO (punches) | Liga Monstro Combate 1 | June 6, 2026 | 1 | 4:48 | Curitiba, Brazil | |
| Loss | 17–7 | Viktor Nemkov | TKO (punches) | Sokol 1 | September 26, 2025 | 1 | 4:56 | Krasnodar, Russia | |
| Win | 17–6 | Davi Lucas da Silva | TKO (punches) | Adventure Fighters Tournament 30 | 30 August 2021 | 1 | 2:35 | Curitiba, Brazil | |
| Win | 16–6 | Gabriel Kanabo | KO (punch) | Face the Danger: Warriors Combat | 30 July 2021 | 1 | 2:15 | Curitiba, Brazil | |
| Win | 15–6 | Adnan Alić | KO (flying knee) | Serbian Battle Championship 27 | 14 March 2020 | 1 | 0:45 | Vrbas, Serbia | |
| Loss | 14–6 | Maurice Greene | TKO (punches) | UFC on ESPN: Ngannou vs. dos Santos | 29 June 2019 | 1 | 3:38 | Minneapolis, Minnesota, United States | |
| Loss | 14–5 | Jairzinho Rozenstruik | TKO (head kick and punches) | UFC Fight Night: Assunção vs. Moraes 2 | 2 February 2019 | 2 | 0:54 | Fortaleza, Brazil | |
| Loss | 14–4 | Aleksei Oleinik | Submission (Ezekiel choke) | UFC 224 | 12 May 2018 | 1 | 1:45 | Rio de Janeiro, Brazil | |
| Loss | 14–3 | Andrei Arlovski | Decision (unanimous) | UFC Fight Night: Poirier vs. Pettis | 11 November 2017 | 3 | 5:00 | Norfolk, Virginia, United States | |
| Win | 14–2 | Timothy Johnson | TKO (punches) | UFC on Fox: Weidman vs. Gastelum | 22 July 2017 | 1 | 2:51 | Uniondale, New York, United States | Performance of the Night. |
| Win | 13–2 | José Rodrigo Guelke | Decision (unanimous) | Aspera FC 43 | 13 August 2016 | 3 | 5:00 | Paranaguá, Brazil | Defended the Aspera FC Heavyweight Championship. |
| Win | 12–2 | Ivan Vičić | TKO (punches) | Serbian Battle Championship 10 | 9 July 2016 | 1 | 0:58 | Bačka Palanka, Serbia | |
| Win | 11–2 | Tiago Cardoso | KO (elbow) | Aspera FC 38 | 27 May 2016 | 3 | 4:45 | Barueri, Brazil | Won the vacant Aspera FC Heavyweight Championship. |
| Win | 10–2 | Paulo Ferreira | Submission (heel hook) | Aspera FC 14 | 29 November 2014 | 1 | 1:12 | Lages, Brazil | |
| Win | 9–2 | Arley Simetti | Submission (armbar) | Aspera FC 13 | 2 November 2014 | 1 | 2:22 | Itapema, Brazil | |
| Win | 8–2 | Diogo Joaquim Silveira | KO (knee) | Aspera FC 11 | 30 August 2014 | 1 | 3:37 | Curitibanos, Brazil | |
| Win | 7–2 | Bruno Polaco | Submission (arm-triangle choke) | Aspera FC 8 | 14 June 2014 | 1 | 0:36 | Paranaguá, Brazil | |
| Win | 6–2 | Alison Vicente | Decision (unanimous) | SMASH Fight 3 | 7 December 2013 | 3 | 5:00 | Curitiba, Brazil | |
| Win | 5–2 | Julio Bizzarri | Submission (guillotine choke) | Felino Fight 3 | 21 September 2013 | 1 | 0:42 | Criciúma, Brazil | Heavyweight debut. |
| Loss | 4–2 | Alberto Emiliano Pereira | Submission (triangle choke) | Nitrix Champion Fight 12 | 18 August 2012 | 2 | 2:42 | Blumenau, Brazil | |
| Loss | 4–1 | Nelson Jaca | Submission (rear-naked choke) | Power Fight Extreme 6 | 19 November 2011 | 2 | 2:53 | Curitiba, Brazil | |
| Win | 4–0 | Fernando Tressino | TKO (knee) | Max Fight 9 | 16 July 2011 | 1 | 2:01 | Campinas, Brazil | |
| Win | 3–0 | Everton Panda | Submission (armbar) | Cristiano Marcello System: Challenger | 19 September 2010 | 1 | 0:50 | Curitiba, Brazil | |
| Win | 2–0 | Marcos Vinicius | Submission (triangle choke) | Arena Gold Fights 2 | 17 July 2010 | 1 | 3:55 | Curitiba, Brazil | |
| Win | 1–0 | Bruno Alboitt | TKO (punches) | Paranaguá Fight 5 | 7 August 2009 | 1 | 4:10 | Paranaguá, Brazil | Light Heavyweight debut. |
