= Edgar Muñoz =

Venezuelan boxer (born 1983)

Personal information
- Full name: Edgar Ramón Muñoz Mata
- Born: 22 December 1983 (age 42) Porlamar, Nueva Esparta, Venezuela
- Height: 184 cm (6 ft 0 in)
- Weight: 81 kg (179 lb)

Sport
- Sport: Boxing
Medal record
Men's amateur boxing
Representing Venezuela
Pan American Games
Silver medal – second place	2015 Toronto	Super heavyweight
Bronze medal – third place	2003 S. Domingo	Light heavyweight
South American Games
Silver medal – second place	2002 Belém	Light heavyweight
Central American and Caribbean Games
Bronze medal – third place	2014 Veracruz	Super heavyweight
Military World Games
Bronze medal – third place	2019 Wuhan	+91 kg

Edgar Ramón Muñoz Mata (Note: In this Spanish name, the first or paternal surname is Muñoz and the second or maternal family name is Mata.) (born 22 December 1983) is a boxer from Venezuela, who participated in the 2004 Summer Olympics for his native South American country.

Muñoz won the bronze medal in the same division in 2003 at the Pan American Games in Santo Domingo. He qualified for the Olympic Games by ending up in first place at the 1st AIBA American 2004 Olympic Qualifying Tournament in Tijuana, Mexico.

At the Olympics he upset Marijo Šivolija but was eliminated 10–18 in the second round of the Light heavyweight (81 kg) division by eventual Belarusian runner-up: Magomed Aripgadjiev.

In 2019 he represented Venezuela at the 2019 Military World Games and he won a bronze medal in the men's +91 kg event.
