= Fabio Turchi =

Italian boxer (born 1993)

Personal information
- Nickname: The Stone Crusher
- Nationality: Italian
- Born: 24 July 1993 (age 32) Florence, Tuscany, Italy
- Height: 6 ft 2 in (188 cm)
- Weight: Cruiserweight

Boxing career
- Reach: 70 in (178 cm)
- Stance: Southpaw

Boxing record
- Total fights: 26
- Wins: 23
- Win by KO: 16
- Losses: 3
Medal record
Men's amateur boxing
Representing Italy
Mediterranean Games
Gold medal – first place	2013 Mersin	Heavyweight
Youth Olympic Games
Silver medal – second place	2010 Singapore	Heavyweight
Youth World Championships
Bronze medal – third place	2010 Baku	Heavyweight

Fabio Turchi (born 24 July 1993) is an Italian professional boxer who held the WBC International cruiserweight title in 2019. As an amateur he won a gold medal at the 2013 Mediterranean Games, silver at the 2010 Youth Olympics and 2014 World Military Championships, and bronze at the 2010 Youth World Championships.

== Professional boxing career ==
Turchi made his professional debut against Adis Dadovic on 31 October 2015. He won the fight by a first-round technical knockout. Turchi amassed an 8–0 record during the next year, with six victories coming by way of stoppage, before being booked to face Maurizio Lovaglio for the vacant Italian cruiserweight title on 23 December 2016. He captured his first professional title with a sixth-round technical knockout of Lovaglio.

Turchi had two more fights before fighting for his first regional title. On 11 March 2017, he beat Isossa Mondo on points and on 2 June 2017, he beat Tamas Kozma by a fourth-round technical knockout. Following these two victories, Turchi was scheduled to face Cesar David Crenz for the vacant WBC International Silver cruiserweight title on 15 July 2017. He won the fight by a fourth-round technical knockout.

Turchi made his United States debut against Demetrius Banks on 1 December 2017. He won the fight by a fourth-round stoppage, as Banks retired at the end of the round. Turchi made his first WBC International Silver title defense against Dario German Balmaceda on 2 February 2018. He won the fight by a first-round technical knockout, stopping Balmaceda at the very last second of the opening round. Turchi made his second title defense against Tony Conquest on 30 November 2018. He won the fight by a seventh-round knockout.

Turchi was expected to face Sami Enbom for the vacant WBC International cruiserweight title on 26 April 2019. On 22 April, it was revealed that Enbom had withdrawn from the bout due to an undisclosed reason, and was replaced by Sami Enbom. Turchi won the fight by a first-round knockout, stopping the Finnish boxer at the 1:16 minute mark of the opening round. Turchi made his first WBC International title defense against Tommy McCarthy on 11 October 2019. McCarthy won the fight by split decision. Two judges scored the fight 115–113 and 116–112 in favor of McCarthy, while the third judge scored the bout 116–112 for Turchi.

Turchi was booked to face Nikolajs Grisunins for the vacant IBF International Cruiserweight title on 23 October 2020. Turchi successfully rebounded from his first professional loss, as he won the fight by unanimous decision, with scores of 100–90, 99–91 and 98–92. Turchi next challenged the EBU cruiserweight champion Dylan Bregeon on 16 April 2019, in the main event of a DAZN broadcast card. He won the fight by unanimous decision, with all three judges scoring the fight 115–113 in his favor.

== Professional boxing record ==
22 fights	20 wins	2 losses
By knockout	14	1
By decision	6	1

No.	Result	Record	Opponent	Type	Round, time	Date	Location	Notes
22	Loss	20–2	(United Kingdom) Richard Riakporhe	TKO	2 (12)	11 Jun 2022	(United Kingdom) The SSE Arena Wembley, London, England	
21	Win	20–1	(Serbia) Vukasin Obradovic	TKO	1 (6)	11 Dec 2021	MGM Gym Via Marco D’Agrate, Milan, Italy	
20	Win	19–1	(France) Dylan Bregeon	UD	12	16 Apr 2021	Allianz Cloud, Milan, Italy	Won EBU Cruiserweight title
19	Win	18–1	(Latvia) Nikolajs Grisunins	UD	10	23 Oct 2020	Allianz Cloud, Milan, Italy	Won vacant IBF International Cruiserweight title
18	Loss	17–1	(United Kingdom) Tommy McCarthy	SD	12	11 Oct 2019	PalaTrento, Trento, Italy	Lost WBC International cruiserweight title
17	Win	17–0	(Finland) Sami Enbom	KO	1 (12), 1:16	26 Apr 2019	Tuscany Hall, Florence, Italy	Won vacant WBC International cruiserweight title
16	Win	16–0	(United Kingdom) Tony Conquest	KO	7 (12), 0:16	30 Nov 2018	Teatro Obi Hall, Florence, Italy	Retained WBC International Silver cruiserweight title
15	Win	15–0	(Italy) Yassine Habachi	UD	6	6 Jul 2018	Teatro Principe, Milan, Italy	
14	Win	14–0	(Argentina) Dario German Balmaceda	TKO	1 (12), 2:59	2 Feb 2018	Nelson Mandela Forum, Florence, Italy	Retained WBC International Silver cruiserweight title
13	Win	13–0	(United States) Demetrius Banks	RTD	4 (8), 3:00	1 Dec 2017	(United States) Strand Ballroom & Theatre, Providence, Rhode Island, U.S.	
12	Win	12–0	(Argentina) Cesar David Crenz	KO	4 (12), 2:09	15 Jul 2017	Piazza Municipale, Sequals, Italy	Won vacant WBC International Silver cruiserweight title
11	Win	11–0	(Hungary) Tamas Kozma	TKO	4 (6), 1:23	2 Jun 2017	Palasport San Filippo, Brescia, Italy	
10	Win	10–0	(France) Isossa Mondo	PTS	6	11 Mar 2017	PalaGiannelli, Siena, Italy	
9	Win	9–0	(Italy) Maurizio Lovaglio	TKO	6 (10), 1:55	23 Dec 2016	Scandicci, Italy	Won vacant Italian cruiserweight title
8	Win	8–0	(Latvia) Arturs Kulikauskis	UD	8	5 Nov 2016	Palasport Mens Sana, Siena, Italy	
7	Win	7–0	(Serbia) Slobodan Culum	TKO	1 (8)	16 Jul 2016	Sequals, Italy	
6	Win	6–0	(Czech Republic) Jiri Svacina	UD	8	24 Jun 2016	Stadio Mario Rigamonti, Brescia, Italy	
5	Win	5–0	(Croatia) Toni Visic	KO	2 (8), 2:28	22 Apr 2016	Nelson Mandela Forum, Florence, Italy	
4	Win	4–0	(Georgia (country)) Shalva Meleksishvili	TKO	2 (6)	18 Mar 2016	PalaGoldoni, Vicenza, Italy	
3	Win	3–0	(Croatia) Marko Martinjak	TKO	2 (6), 1:55	26 Dec 2015	Palasport ITI/Palamattioli, Florence, Italy	
2	Win	2–0	(Hungary) Gyorgy Novak	TKO	1 (6)	27 Nov 2015	Scandicci, Italy	
1	Win	1–0	(Bosnia and Herzegovina) Adis Dadovic	TKO	1 (6), 1:01	31 Oct 2015	Pala Hilton Pharma, Ferrara, Italy	
