= Rafael Lima (boxer) =

Brazilian boxer (born 1983)

Personal information
- Born: 9 March 1983 (age 43) Belém, Brazil

Sport
- Sport: Boxing
Medal record
Representing Brazil
Pan American Games
Bronze medal – third place	2007 Rio de Janeiro	Heavyweight
Bronze medal – third place	2015 Toronto	Super heavyweight

Rafael Duarte Lima (born March 9, 1983) is a Brazilian boxer best known to win the bronze medal in heavyweight event at the 2007 Pan American Games.

== Career ==
Lima started to box at the age of 18 and won the National Championships at 201 lbs from 2003 to 2007.

He won silver medal at the 2006 South American Games when he lost the final to José Payares .

In 2007 he lost his semifinal to top favorite Osmay Acosta winning the bronze medal at the Pan American Games in Rio de Janeiro.
