= Joshua Temple =

American boxer

Joshua Temple (born October 12, 1992) is an American professional boxer.

Temple won the heavyweight title at the USA National Championships Boxing 2014.

At the 2015 AIBA World Boxing Championships he fought as a heavyweight, winning his first match and losing his second.
