= K-1 Premium Dynamite!! =

Annual K-1 martial arts megaevent

Dynamite!!
- The poster for Dynamite!!
- Promotion: K-1, PRIDE, Hero's, EliteXC, DREAM, SRC
- Date: December 31
- Venue: Various
- City: Various

K-1 PREMIUM Dynamite!! (or simply Dynamite!!) was an annual kickboxing and mixed martial arts (MMA) event held in Japan by the Fighting and Entertainment Group (FEG), traditionally held on New Year's Eve. The events were known for their large-scale production, crossover matchups, and combination of kickboxing and MMA bouts, often featuring prominent fighters from both disciplines.

The series became one of the major fixtures of Japan's New Year's Eve combat sports tradition and featured competitors from promotions including K-1, PRIDE Fighting Championships, Hero's, DREAM, EliteXC, and Sengoku Raiden Championship. The Dynamite!! series ran from 2002 to 2010 and included one event held outside Japan, Dynamite!! USA, in 2007.

== History ==
It began as a co-production between the Pride Fighting Championships (PRIDE) and FEG's K-1 group, with the first event being held on August 28, 2002. The inaugural event was referred to by K-1 as "Dynamite!!" while PRIDE called the event "Shockwave". Its live audience totaled 91,108 people, which is the largest on-record attendance for either organization and the largest attendance in the history of MMA. However, disagreements between FEG and Pride FC's parent company Dream Stage Entertainment (DSE) led to the end of their partnership, and the two promotions began organizing separate events. K-1 subsequently continued the Dynamite!! series under the K-1 Premium banner, while PRIDE held its own New Year's Eve event under the Shockwave name. The first independently produced K-1 Premium Dynamite!! event was held on December 31, 2003, establishing the series as K-1's annual New Year's Eve event.

Even after the end of the participation of fighters from PRIDE, Dynamite!! events remained unique from other K-1 events in that they featured cards with both MMA and kickboxing bouts on them. Later, the Dynamite!! events became co-productions between K-1 and FEG's own MMA promotions — first Hero's and later DREAM. In addition to FEG's own MMA promotions, the Dynamite!! 2009 event was co-produced with the Sengoku Raiden Championship (SRC) MMA promotion.

In 2007, the only Dynamite!! event to be hosted outside of Japan, Dynamite!! USA, was held. Dynamite!! USA was a co-production with Elite Xtreme Combat (EliteXC) and the only pure MMA event of the Dynamite!! series. The event was considered a commercial disaster, drawing a significantly smaller audience than the Dynamite!! events held in Japan and generating only around 35,000 pay-per-view buys. Although an attendance of more than 40,000 was initially announced, the California State Athletic Commission reported that only 3,674 tickets had been purchased by the public, with much of the remaining attendance consisting of tickets purchased or distributed by the organizers.

The Dynamite!! series came to an end following the financial decline of FEG and its K-1 and DREAM promotions. Dynamite!! 2010, held on December 31, 2010, was the final event to use the Dynamite!! name under FEG. FEG subsequently entered a period of financial restructuring and was unable to continue operating its promotions at the same level. For New Year's Eve 2011, the traditional Dynamite!! event was replaced by Fight for Japan: Genki Desu Ka!! Omisoka!! 2011, which was jointly promoted by DREAM, the Inoki Genome Federation and M-1 Global. FEG's financial difficulties continued into 2012, when the company was declared bankrupt, effectively bringing the original Dynamite!! series to an end.

== Events ==
| Event | Date | Location | Venue | Attendance |
|---|---|---|---|---|
| Dynamite!! | August 28, 2002 | (Japan) Shinjuku, Tokyo Metropolis | Tokyo National Stadium | 91,107 |
| K-1 PREMIUM 2003 Dynamite!! | December 31, 2003 | (Japan) Nagoya, Aichi Prefecture | Nagoya Dome | 43,500 |
| K-1 PREMIUM 2004 Dynamite!! | December 31, 2004 | (Japan) Osaka, Osaka Prefecture | Osaka Dome | 52,918 |
| K-1 PREMIUM 2005 Dynamite!! | December 31, 2005 | (Japan) Osaka, Osaka Prefecture | Osaka Dome | 53,025 |
| K-1 PREMIUM 2006 Dynamite!! | December 31, 2006 | (Japan) Osaka, Osaka Prefecture | Osaka Dome | 51,930 |
| Dynamite!! USA | June 2, 2007 | (United States) Los Angeles, California | Los Angeles Coliseum | 18,340 |
| K-1 PREMIUM 2007 Dynamite!! | December 31, 2007 | (Japan) Osaka, Osaka Prefecture | Osaka Dome | 47,928 |
| Dynamite!! 2008 | December 31, 2008 | (Japan) Saitama, Saitama Prefecture | Saitama Super Arena | 25,634 |
| Dynamite!! 2009 | December 31, 2009 | (Japan) Saitama, Saitama Prefecture | Saitama Super Arena | 45,606 |
| Dynamite!! 2010 | December 31, 2010 | (Japan) Saitama, Saitama Prefecture | Saitama Super Arena | 26,729 |

== See also ==
- K-1
- List of K-1 Events
- Pride Fighting Championships
- List of Pride FC events
- Kickboxing
- Mixed martial arts
