= Nobuyuki Sakakibara =

Japanese MMA executive (born 1963)

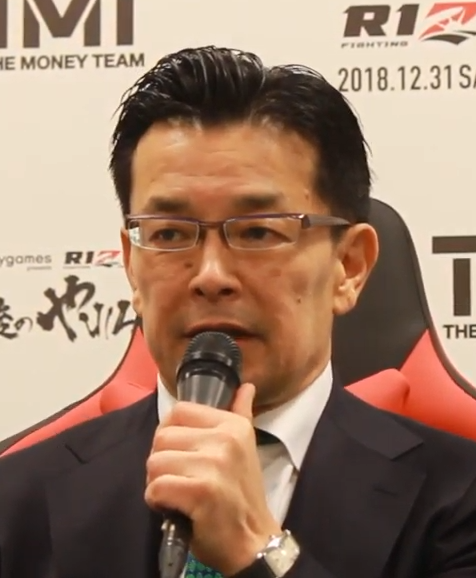
- 2019
- Born: November 18, 1963 (age 62); Handa, Aichi, Japan
- Occupation: Businessman

Nobuyuki Sakakibara (榊原信行, Sakakibara Nobuyuki; born November 18, 1963) is a Japanese businessman and mixed martial arts (MMA) promoter. He is known for his executive role in Dream Stage Entertainment, including its promotions Pride Fighting Championships and Fighting Opera Hustle, and works as the current president of Rizin Fighting Federation.

== Career ==
After graduating from Aichi University in 1987, Sakakibara started working at Tōkai Television Broadcasting, where he organized combat sports events, among them K-1 and Union of Wrestling Forces International. In October 1997, he joined Hiromichi Momose and Naoto Morishita to form Kakutogi Revolution Sports, which produced the first Pride event. KRS dissolved shortly after and its member founded Dream Stage Entertainment as Pride's mother company. In 2003, after Morishita's death, Sakakibara was ascended to Pride presidency. The next year, he also founded and directed Dream Stage Pictures, and participated in the first event of DSE professional wrestling promotion Fighting Opera Hustle. In March 2007, Sakakibara sold Pride to Lorenzo Fertitta and Frank Fertitta III, co-owners of Zuffa, which owned rival MMA promotion the Ultimate Fighting Championship (UFC). Though the figure was not publicly disclosed, a person familiar with the negotiations told the Associated Press it was for less than $70 million.

Sakakibara then served as a backer for soccer team FC Ryukyu. He also produced events for singer Gackt and kabuki actor Ichikawa Ebizō.

Regardless of the fact that he had to abide by a non-compete clause as part of the sale of Pride, Sakakibara originally had no intention of returning to the MMA business. However, he returned in October 2015 by launching Rizin Fighting Federation. In 2019, it was learned that Zuffa had paid Sakakibara $10 million when they bought Pride as part of a 7-year non-compete clause.

== Accomplishments ==
- Wrestling Observer Newsletter
  - Promoter of the Year (2003, 2004)
