= Pride Shockwave =

Pride FC MMA events in 2002

Pride Shockwave Dynamite!!
- The poster for Pride Shockwave; Dynamite!!
- Promotion: PRIDE FC, K-1
- Date: August 28, 2002
- Venue: Tokyo National Stadium
- City: Tokyo
- Attendance: 91,107 (disputed claim)

Event chronology
Pride The Best Vol.2	Pride Shockwave; Dynamite!!	Pride 22

Pride Shockwave is the international PPV broadcast name for the mixed martial arts and kickboxing event co-promoted by the PRIDE Fighting Championships and K-1 on August 28, 2002. It was held at the Tokyo National Stadium in Tokyo, Japan. The proper name for the event was Dynamite!! Biggest Mixed Martial Arts World Cup - Summer Night Fever in the National Stadium, also known shortly as Dynamite!!

A co-production between the two leading combat sports promotions in Japan, the event was promoted as a celebration of martial arts and brought together competitors from a variety of fighting disciplines. With a reported attendance of 91,107 (though other sources claim 71,000), it remains the highest number of attendance for a live MMA event in the sport's history. The event had a big opening ceremony, which featured Antonio Inoki dropping into the stadium by parachute. He then joined Hélio Gracie and the two "founding fathers of MMA" lit a ceremonial olympic torch together.

The actual event was marked by a "freak show fight" between 223 lb (101 kg) Antônio Rodrigo Nogueira and 350 lb (158 kg) Bob Sapp. The match had a special rule to ban knee strikes on the ground, making it a more even affair. In the first seconds of the match, Nogueira was dropped in a piledriver and got slammed on his head, despite that and Sapp's strong punches, Nogueira was able to defend himself for 19-minutes and defeat Sapp at the second round with an armbar. The other famous event was Hidehiko Yoshida vs. Royce Gracie, a "special rules match" with both fighters wearing keikogis and with limited striking allowed, billed as a "rematch" of Masahiko Kimura vs. Hélio Gracie, which had happened 50 years earlier. The match would end controversially as Gracie was caught in a sode guruma jime ("Ezekiel") chokehold from the mount. The referee felt Gracie passed out from the choke but was unable to see his face, still he awarded the victory to Yoshida by knockout. Royce stood up and protested the win, claiming he was neither unconscious nor tapped out and demanded the referees to declare a tie or rematch, the squabble soon resulted into a full on brawl between the corners of the two fighters.

Following disagreements between DSE and FEG, the two companies ended their partnership. Inspired by the success of Antonio Inoki's Inoki Bom-Ba-Ye events, which had been held on New Year's Eve, both promotions began holding separate year-end events. As a result, the Dynamite!! and Shockwave series were split, with K-1 continuing Dynamite!! and PRIDE organizing its own New Year's Eve events under the Shockwave name.

== Results ==
Main Card
Weight class				Method	Round	Time	Notes
	Mirko Cro Cop	def.	Kazushi Sakuraba	TKO (Doctor Stoppage)	2	5:00
	Antônio Rodrigo Nogueira	def.	Bob Sapp	Submission (Armbar)	2	4:03
	Jerome Le Banner	def.	Don Frye	KO (Right Hook)	1	1:30	(Note: Kickboxing bout)
	Ernesto Hoost	drew.	Semmy Schilt	Unanimous Draw	3		(Note: Kickboxing bout)
	Gary Goodridge	def.	Lloyd Van Dams	TKO (Punches)	1	3:39
	Jerrel Venetiaan	def.	Daijiro Matsui	Decision (Split)	3	5:00
	Wanderlei Silva	def.	Tatsuya Iwasaki	TKO (Head Kick and Punches)	1	1:16

== See also ==
- Pride Fighting Championships
- List of Pride Fighting Championships champions
- List of Pride Fighting events
- 2002 in Pride FC
- List of K-1 events
- K-1 PREMIUM Dynamite!!
