= Shigeru Saeki =

Japanese sports promoter

Shigeru Saeki (佐伯 繁, Saeki Shigeru; born June 24, 1969 in Toyama Prefecture, Japan) is a Japanese mixed martial arts promoter and executive.

Saeki had worked as a photojournalist in various sports media and in 2001, he became the president of the promotion Deep 2001. Saeki joined Dream Stage Entertainment (DSE) to promote Pride Bushido series that started in 2003, where he held the position of public relations director.

After the dissolution of DSE in 2007, Saeki continued to act as the president of Deep and later also became the supervisor of the female promotion Jewels formed in 2008. In 2011, Saeki became one of the co-promoters for the amateur promotion Japan MMA League (JML).
