= 1983 in professional wrestling =

1983 in professional wrestling describes the year's events in the world of professional wrestling.

== List of notable promotions ==
These promotions held notable shows in 1983.

Promotion Name	Abbreviation
American Wrestling Association	AWA
Empresa Mexicana de Lucha Libre	EMLL
Jim Crockett Promotions	JCP
Maple Leaf Wrestling	MLW
New Japan Pro Wrestling	NJPW
World Wrestling Council	WWC

== Calendar of notable shows ==
Date	Promotion(s)	Event	Location	Main Event
April 22	EMLL	27. Aniversario de Arena México	Mexico City, Mexico	Super Halcón (c) defeated Pirata Morgan in a best two-out-of-three falls match for the Mexican National Heavyweight Championship
April 24	AWA	AWA Super Sunday	St. Paul, Minnesota	Nick Bockwinkel (c) defeated Hulk Hogan by reverse decision disqualification in a singles match for the AWA World Heavyweight Title with Lord James Blears as special guest referee
June 2	NJPW	IWGP League	Tokyo, Japan	Hulk Hogan defeated Antonio Inoki
June 10	MLW	Night of the Champions	Toronto, Ontario	Ric Flair defeated NWA World Heavyweight Champion Harley Race by disqualification in a singles match
July 24	MLW	Return of the Champions	Toronto, Ontario	NWA World Heavyweight Champion Harley Race defeated Ric Flair by disqualification in a singles match with Johnny Weaver as special guest referee
September 17	WWC	WWC 10th Aniversario	San Juan, Puerto Rico	André the Giant defeated Abdullah the Butcher via countout in a singles match
September 23	EMLL	EMLL 50th Anniversary Show	Mexico City, Mexico	Sangre Chicana defeated MS-1 in a Lucha de Apuestas Hair vs. Hair match
October 23	JCP	The Last Battle of Atlanta	Atlanta, Georgia	Tommy Rich defeated Buzz Sawyer in a Steel Cage Match with Paul Ellering suspended above the cage
November 24	JCP	Starrcade	Greensboro, North Carolina	Ric Flair defeated Harley Race (c) in a steel cage match for the NWA World Heavyweight Championship with Gene Kiniski as special guest referee
December 8	NJPW	MSG Tag League	Tokyo, Japan	Antonio Inoki and Hulk Hogan defeated Adrian Adonis and Dick Murdoch
December 9	EMLL	Juicio Final	Mexico City, Mexico	Rayo de Jalisco Jr. defeated El Egipico in a Lucha de Apuestas, mask vs. mask match
(c) – denotes defending champion(s)

== Notable events ==
- January 22: The Don Muraco-Pedro Morales rivalry reached its peak at Madison Square Garden in New York City when Muraco pinned Morales to become the new WWF Intercontinental champion.
- March 8: The Wild Samoans defeated Jules Strongbow and Chief Jay Strongbow to win their 3rd WWF Tag Team Championship on WWF Championship Wrestling.
- March 10–11: The WWF holds its first ever live events outside the Northeast in San Diego and Los Angeles, California
- The WWF now fully owned by Vince McMahon seceded from the National Wrestling Alliance at the annual NWA Convention.
- Wrestling All Stars magazine published its first issue.
- September 4: WWF All-American Wrestling debut on the USA Network
- September 10: Wrestling at the Chase ended its 24 year run on St. Louis television station KPLR-TV
- November 15: Tony Atlas and Rocky Johnson made WWF history as they became the first African-Americans to win the WWF Tag Team Championship in a no-disqualification match against The Wild Samoans on WWE Championship Wrestling.
- December 26: Iron Sheik managed by "Classy" Freddie Blassie defeated WWF World Heavyweight Champion Bob Backlund ending Backlund's nearly 6 year run when his manager Arnold Skaaland threw in his towel in New York, NY

== Accomplishments and tournaments ==
=== AJW ===
Accomplishment	Winner	Date won	Notes
Rookie of the Year Decision Tournament	Keiko Nakano		

=== AJPW ===
Accomplishment	Winner	Date won	Notes
Lou Thesz Cup 1983	Shiro Koshinaka	April 22	

=== NJPW ===
Accomplishment	Winner	Date won	Notes
IWGP League	Hulk Hogan	June 4	defeated Antonio Inoki in the finals

== Awards and honors ==
=== Pro Wrestling Illustrated ===
Category	Winner
PWI Wrestler of the Year	Harley Race
PWI Tag Team of the Year	The Road Warriors (Hawk and Animal)
PWI Match of the Year	Ric Flair vs. Harley Race
PWI Most Popular Wrestler of the Year	Jimmy Snuka
PWI Most Hated Wrestler of the Year	Greg Valentine
PWI Most Improved Wrestler of the Year	Brett Wayne Sawyer
PWI Most Inspirational Wrestler of the Year	Hulk Hogan
PWI Rookie of the Year	Angelo Mosca Jr.
PWI Manager of the Year	J. J. Dillon
PWI Editor's Award	The Grand Wizard

=== Wrestling Observer Newsletter ===
Category	Winner
Wrestler of the Year	Ric Flair
Feud of the Year	The Freebirds vs. The Von Erichs
Tag Team of the Year	Ricky Steamboat and Jay Youngblood
Most Improved	Curt Hennig
Best on Interviews	Roddy Piper

== Births ==
- Date of birth uncertain:
  - Quicksilver
- January 8 – Chris Masters
- January 18 - Adam Thornstowe
- January 21 – Maryse Ouellet
- January 30 – Rockstar Spud
- February 10:
  - Taiji Ishimori
  - Kevin Matthews
- February 21 – Wes Brisco
- February 25 - Steven Lewington
- March 1
  - Davey Richards
  - Mark Sterling
- March 17 - Timothy Thatcher
- March 18 – Ethan Carter III
- March 19 – Matt Sydal
- March 26 - Mike Mondo
- March 30 – Zach Gowen
- March 31 – Iestyn Rees
- April 2 - Scorpio Sky
- April 5:
  - Bushi
  - Chie Ishii
- April 9 - Hade Vansen
- April 25 - DeAngelo Williams
- April 27 - Lacey
- May 1 - Human Tornado
- May 7 - Tanga Loa
- May 11 - Daizee Haze
- May 15 - Tom Lawlor
- May 18 - Matt Riviera
- May 19 - Chris Van Vliet
- May 21 – Leva Bates
- May 23 – Alex Shelley
- June 23 - Brandi Rhodes
- July 11 - Marcus Louis
- July 15 – Heath Slater
- July 22 - Fandango (wrestler)
- July 24 - Joey Kovar (died in 2012)
- July 26 – Roderick Strong
- August 3 - Ladybeard
- August 8 - Rampage Brown
- August 23 – J.C. Bailey (died in 2010)
- August 24 – Tino Sabbatelli
- September 6:
  - Sam Roberts
  - Braun Strowman
- September 16 – Jennifer Blake
- September 22 - Absolute Andy (died in 2023)
- September 30 - Pacman Jones
- October 1 – Robbie E
- October 3 - Mikey Batts
- October 8 – Hiro Tonai
- October 10 – Daisuke Masaoka
- October 16 – Kenny Omega
- October 19 – Robert Evans
- October 22 – Taya Valkyrie
- November 2 – Darren Young
- November 8 - Lucky Cannon
- November 11 – Kristal Marshall
- November 21:
  - Nikki Bella
  - Brie Bella
- November 25 - Kirby Mack
- November 28 –
  - Summer Rae
  - Gota Ihashi
- November 29 - Rosemary
- December 7 - Matt Menard
- December 15 – Rene Dupree
- December 16 :
  - Kris Travis (died in 2016)
  - Jigsaw
- December 22 – Luke Gallows
- December 29 - El Desperado (wrestler)
- December 30 - Eddie Edwards

== Debuts ==
- Uncertain debut date

- Scott Armstrong
- Desiree Petersen
- William Regal
- Rick Steiner
- Ben Bassarab
- Ramón Álvarez (wrestler)
- Bull Nakano
- Dan Spivey
- Ken Resnick
- Yumi Ogura (All Japan Women)

- March 5 - Cueball Carmichael
- June 6 - Road Warrior Hawk
- June 12 - Bestia Salvaje
- June 24 - Mick Foley and Kanako Nagatomo (All Japan Women's)
- September 23 - Tommy Ran (All Japan Women's) and Mika Komatsu (All Japan Women's)

== Retirements ==
- Dean Ho (1962 - 1983)
- Mikel Scicluna (1953 - 1983)

== Deaths ==
- February 7 - Miguel Ángel Delgado, 35
- March 6 - Mayes McLain, 77
- March 12 - Fred Meyer (wrestler), 82
- May 10 - Frank Tunney, 70
- May 25 - Johnny Rougeau, 53
- May 31 - Jack Dempsey, 87
- October 1 - Johan Richthoff, 85
- October 12 - The Grand Wizard, 57
- October 28 - Art Neilson, 56
- December 9 - Earl McCready, 78
- December 19 - Dizzy Davis, 69

== See also ==
- List of WCW pay-per-view events
