= Shinya Hashimoto Memorial Legacy Cup Tournament =

Annual wrestling tournament

- Promotion: Pro Wrestling WORLD-1
- Date: 2008-
- City: Limerick, Pennsylvania (2008); Morganville, New Jersey (2009); Jackson, New Jersey (2010)
- Venue: Gold's Gym (2008); Langan Baseball Arena (2009); Knights of Columbus (2010)

The Shinya Hashimoto Memorial Tournament is an annual professional wrestling memorial event produced by Steve Corino's Pro Wrestling WORLD-1 (WORLD-1) promotion, typically between July and September. It is held in honor of Japanese wrestler Shinya Hashimoto, one of the most popular stars in Japan during the 1990s, who died of a brain aneurysm in Tokyo, Japan, on July 11, 2005. It is the second Hashimoto memorial show following HUSTLE's Shinya Hashimoto Memorial Six Man Tag Team Tournament in 2006. Officially sanctioned by Pro Wrestling Zero1, is the first and only Hashimoto memorial event ever held outside Japan.

Traditionally a standard 8-man single-elimination tournament, the wrestlers in the tournament are most often junior heavyweight wrestlers from independent promotions in the United States and other parts of the world. The tournament has been hosted by the New Jersey–based Pro Wrestling WORLD-1 since 2008 and has held three Hashimoto Memorial tournaments. In 2010, the tournament was renamed the Shinya Hashimoto Memorial Legacy Cup and held as a Puroresu-style round-robin tournament. No wrestler has ever won the tournament twice, however, both Steve Corino and Ryan Sawyer are the only wrestlers to have participated in the event more than once.

== History and format ==
The tournament was conceived in early-2008 by Japanese promoter Yoshiyuki Nakamura and American wrestler Steve Corino as a joint project between their respective promotions, ZERO-ONE Fighting Athletes and 3K Wrestling Fighting Athletes (which would later combine with B4W Pro Wrestling to form Pro Wrestling WORLD-1) respectively, as memorial event for Japanese wrestler Shinya Hashimoto. Both Hashimoto and Nakamura, though their ZERO1 promotion, assisted many young American wrestlers, including Corino, by bringing them to compete in Japan. Proposing a U.S.-based tournament for young independent wrestlers from throughout the world to compete in his memory, the two were granted permission to hold the event by Hashimoto's widow. She later expressed interest in their son, Daichi Hashimoto, to someday participate in the tournament.

In 2010, the tournament was renamed to the Shinya Hashimoto Memorial Legacy Cup to signify the addition of the "Legacy Cup" formerly used by the defunct Premier Wrestling Federation. The tournament was also divided into a two-block system commonly used in Japanese wrestling tournaments. In this format the top two scorers in each block advance to the semi-finals, which is decided by a standard wrestling match. In the scoring for the round-robin portion, a win is worth two points, a draw is worth one, and a loss zero; all matches have a 15-minute time limit.

== Tournament winners ==
| Tournament | Year | Winner | Total won | Reference |
|---|---|---|---|---|
| Hashimoto Memorial Tournament | 2008 | Ricky Reyes | 1 | |
| Hashimoto Memorial Tournament II | 2009 | Ryan Sawyer | 1 | |
| Hashimoto Legacy Cup III | 2010 | Adam Cole | 1 | |

== 2008 ==
The 2008 Shinya Hashimoto Memorial Tournament was an 8-man single elimination tournament held on July 11, 2008, at Gold's Gym in Limerick, Pennsylvania. Wrestlers from several promotions, including 3K Wrestling Fighting Athletes, took part in the inaugural tournament including Jerry Lynn, Ricky Landell, Josh Daniels, Chuck "Guillotine" LeGrande, Jake Manning and King Kaluha. C. W. Anderson was also scheduled to be on the card but was replaced by Steve Corino at the last minute.

Ricky Reyes won the tournament by winning two matches at the event. Over the course of the evening, he defeated Josh Daniels in the opening round and, as the result of an unexpected time-limit draw between King Kaluha and Steve Corino, wrestled both Jerry Lynn and Ricky Landell in a Three-Way Dance to win the tournament. In addition to the tournament, several other matches were held at the event. On the undercard, Alex Balboa wrestled Are$, accompanied by Allison Danger, a match which was won by Balboa. The WORLD-1 Premier Tag Team Championship was also defended for the first time, as The Inner Circle (Tommy Thunda and Vinnie Vertigo) successfully defended the championship in a Three-Way Dance against Team MackTion (Kirby Mack and T.J. Mack) and The Best Around (Bruce Maxwell and TJ Cannon).

=== Results ===
July 11, 2008 in Limerick, Pennsylvania (Gold's Gym)

| No. | Results | Stipulations | Times |
|---|---|---|---|
| 1 | Ricky Reyes defeated Josh Daniels | First Round Tournament match | 12:41 |
| 2 | Ricky Landell defeated Chuck LeGrande by TKO | First Round Tournament match | 06:27 |
| 3 | Jerry Lynn defeated Jake Manning | First Round Tournament match | 07:43 |
| 4 | King Kaluha vs. Steve Corino ended in a time-limit draw | First Round Tournament match | 15:00 |
| 5 | The Inner Circle (Tommy Thunda and Vinnie Vertigo) (c) defeated Team MackTion (Kirby Mack and T.J. Mack) and The Best Around (Bruce Maxwell and TJ Cannon) | Three-Way Tag Team match for the WORLD-1 Premier Tag Team Championship | 15:29 |
| 6 | Alex Balboa defeated Are$ (with Allison Danger) | Singles match | 07:23 |
| 7 | Kevin Payne, Kid America and Ryan Sawyer defeated The Axis Of Evil (Chemical Khan, Greg Spitz and The Monster C) | Six-Man Tag Team match | 10:08 |
| 8 | Ricky Reyes defeated Jerry Lynn and Ricky Landell | Finals match | 10:31 |
(c) / – the champion(s) heading into the match

=== Tournament brackets ===
The tournament took place on July 11, 2008. The tournament brackets were:

Pin-Pinfall; Sub-Submission; CO-Countout; DCO-Double countout; DQ-Disqualification; Ref-Referee's decision

First round
Ricky Reyes | Pin
Josh Daniels
Ricky Landell
Chuck LeGrande | Ref

Semifinals
Ricky Reyes
Ricky Landell

First round
Jerry Lynn | Pin
Jake Manning
King Kaluha | Draw
Steve Corino

Semifinals
Jerry Lynn
BYE

=== Finals ===
Semi-Finals
Ricky Reyes
Josh Daniels | Pin
Ricky Landell
Chuck LeGrande | Ref
Jerry Lynn
BYE

Finals^{1}
1 | Ricky Reyes | Pin
2 | Ricky Landell
3 | Jerry Lynn

1. Instead of Lynn receiving a bye to the finals, WORLD-1 officials ordered the tournament to be decided among the three remaining participants in a final three-way elimination match. Lynn eliminated Ricky Landell (7:44) and Ricky Reyes eliminated Lynn.

== 2009 ==
The 2009 Shinya Hashimoto Memorial Tournament was an 8-man single elimination tournament held on August 28, 2009, at the Langan Baseball Arena in Morganville, New Jersey. Wrestlers from eight promotions, including Pro-Wrestling WORLD-1, were represented at the tournament including All Action Wrestling Australia, B4W Fighting Athletes, Free Female Wrestling, Platinum Pro Wrestling, Survivor, Warriors of Wrestling, and World Xtreme Wrestling C4.

"Ruthless" Ryan Sawyer won the tournament by winning three matches at the event. Over the course of the evening, he defeated Craven in the quarter-finals, Steve Corino in the semi-finals and WORLD-1 North American Champion Alex Anthony in the final match by referee decision. At age 18, Sawyer became the youngest winner in the tournament's history. Sawyer's victory over Corino, one of his two original trainers, signaled a major highlight in his career. His second trainer, Ricky Reyes, had won the inaugural tournament the previous year and, at the time, it was hinted a future match between the two in the near future.

=== Results ===
August 28, 2009 in Morganville, New Jersey (Langan Baseball Arena)

| No. | Results | Stipulations | Times |
|---|---|---|---|
| 1 | Alex Anthony (B4W) defeated Havoc (WXW C4) | Quarter-Final Tournament match | 08:57 |
| 2 | Erico (PPW) vs. Sean Haze (FREE) ended in a time-limit draw | Quarter-Final Tournament match | 15:00 |
| 3 | Steve Corino (Survivor) defeated Damian Dragon (WOW) | Quarter-Final Tournament match | 10:02 |
| 4 | Ryan Sawyer (3KWrestling) defeated Craven (AAW Australia) | Quarter-Final Tournament match | 07:45 |
| 5 | Foxxy Foxx and Reiko DMF defeated Roxie Cotton and Super Sweet | Mixed tag team match | 08:12 |
| 6 | Alex Anthony defeated Erico and Sean Haze | Semi-Final Tournament match | 12:39 |
| 7 | Ryan Sawyer defeated Steve Corino by disqualification | Semi-Final Tournament match | 06:22 |
| 8 | Chris Rockwell and Tommy Thunda (c) defeated GPS and The Beast | Tag Team match for the WORLD-1 Tag Team Championship | 11:11 |
| 9 | Ryan Sawyer defeated Alex Anthony by referee decision | Tournament Finals match | 08:51 |
(c) / – the champion(s) heading into the match

=== Tournament brackets ===
The tournament took place on August 28, 2009. The tournament brackets were:

Pin-Pinfall; Sub-Submission; CO-Countout; DCO-Double countout; DQ-Disqualification; Ref-Referee's decision

Quarterfinals
Alex Anthony | Pin
Havoc
Erico
Sean Haze | Draw
Steve Corino | Pin
Damian Dragon
Ryan Sawyer | Pin
Craven

Semifinals
Alex Anthony^{1}
Erico and Sean Haze | Pin
Steve Corino
Ryan Sawyer | DQ

Final
Alex Anthony
Ryan Sawyer | Ref

1. Instead of Anthony receiving a bye to the finals, WORLD-1 officials ordered the semi-finals to be decided in a three-way elimination match.

== 2010 ==
The 2010 Shinya Hashimoto Memorial Legacy Cup was a two-block, 8-man tournament held between September 12 and December 5, 2010, at the Knights of Columbus in Jackson, New Jersey. The name change was to reflect the revival of the Premier Wrestling Federation "Legacy Cup" previously won by Johnny Kashmere (2001) and Christopher Daniels (2002). Wrestlers from six promotions, including Pro Wrestling WORLD-1, were represented at the tournament including ACE Pro Wrestling, Combat Zone Wrestling, Pro Wrestling Zero1, Ring of Honor and Tri-State Wrestling Alliance.

Unlike the traditional 8-man single elimination tournament, the 2010 event was held as a Puroresu-style round-robin tournament with a points system similar to Champion Carnival or the World's Strongest Tag Determination League. The eight participants were split into two groups, A-Block and B-Block, with the winners of each meeting in a final match to determine the winner. Points were awarded under the following conditions:

- Two points were awarded for each win by pinfall or submission.
- One point were awarded for a draw, double-countout, or double-disqualification.
- Zero points for a loss.

The participants were separated into two separate blocks; Adam Cole (CZW), Bobby Dempsey (ROH), Original Monster C (ZERO1) and Kid America (TWA) were in "Block A" and Ryan Sawyer (WORLD-1), Damian Dragon (WORLD-1), Sam Shields (ACE) and Super Sweet (WORLD-1) were in "Block B". The winners of each block, Adam Cole and Ryan Sawyer, faced each other in the tournament finals at the Knights of Columbus in Jackson, New Jersey on December 5, 2010. Cole, who was also then reigning WORLD-1 North American Champion, defeated Sawyer to win the tournament.

=== Results (Day 1) ===
September 12, 2010 in Jackson, New Jersey (Knights of Columbus)

| No. | Results | Stipulations | Times |
|---|---|---|---|
| 1 | The Funky Fresh Boyz (K-Fresh and K-Funk) defeated Bobby Shields and Rapid Fire Maldonado (with Big Sal and Rob Dimension) | Tag Team match | 12:12 |
| 2 | Original Monster C (ZERO1) [2] defeated Adam Cole (CZW) [0] | Hashimoto Legacy Cup 2010 Block A Match | 10:59 |
| 3 | Bobby Dempsey (ROH) [2] defeated Kid America (TWA) [0] | Hashimoto Legacy Cup 2010 Block A Match | 09:34 |
| 4 | Damian Dragon [2] (WORLD-1) defeated Sam Shields (ACE) [0] | Hashimoto Legacy Cup 2010 Block B Match | 14:39 |
| 5 | Ryan Sawyer (WORLD-1) [2] defeated Super Sweet (WORLD-1) [0] | Hashimoto Legacy Cup 2010 Block B Match | 06:14 |
| 6 | Colby Corino and Steve Corino (c) defeated Chris Rockwell and Sam Shields (with Denver Street and Richard Guille) | Tag Team match for the WORLD-1 Tag Team Championship | 20:10 |
(c) / – the champion(s) heading into the match

=== Results (Day 2) ===
October 24, 2010 in Jackson, New Jersey (Knights of Columbus)

| No. | Results | Stipulations |
|---|---|---|
| 1 | Roxie Cotton defeated 15 other participants by last eliminating Chris Rockwell | 15-man battle royal; As per the pre-match stipulations, the winner became the number one contender for the WORLD-1 Heavyweight Championship |
| 2 | Damian Dragon (WORLD-1) [4] defeated Super Sweet (WORLD-1) [0] | Hashimoto Legacy Cup 2010 Block B Match with special guest referee Reiko DMF |
| 3 | Bobby Dempsey (ROH) [3] vs. Original Monster C (ZERO1) [3] ended in a double-countout | Hashimoto Legacy Cup 2010 Block A Match with special guest referee Tommy Thunda |
| 4 | Ryan Sawyer (WORLD-1) [4] defeated Sam Shields (ACE) [0] | Hashimoto Legacy Cup 2010 Block B Match with special guest referee Reiko DMF |
| 5 | Adam Cole (c) (CZW) [2] defeated Kid America (TWA) [0] | Hashimoto Legacy Cup 2010 Block A Match; As per the pre-match stipulations, the WORLD-1 North American Championship was also on the line. |
| 6 | GPS defeated Denver Street | Singles match with special guest referee Reiko DMF |
| 7 | Chris Rockwell (c) defeated Roxie Cotton | Singles match for the WORLD-1 Heavyweight Championship with special guest referee Tommy Thunda |
(c) / – the champion(s) heading into the match

=== Results (Day 3) ===
December 5, 2010 in Jackson, New Jersey (Knights of Columbus)

| No. | Results | Stipulations | Times |
|---|---|---|---|
| 1 | Bobby Shields and Kid America defeated Colby Corino and Steve Corino (c) | Tag Team match for the WORLD-1 Tag Team Championship | 13:13 |
| 2 | Adam Cole (c) vs. Sam Shields ended in a time-limit draw | Singles match for the WORLD-1 North American Championship | 20:00 |
| 3 | Kid America (TWA) [2] defeated Original Monster C (ZERO1) [3] (with Rob Dimension) | Hashimoto Legacy Cup 2010 Block A Match | 06:35 |
| 4 | Sam Shields (ACE) [2] defeated Super Sweet (WORLD-1) [0] | Hashimoto Legacy Cup 2010 Block B Match | 06:53 |
| 5 | Adam Cole (CZW) [4] defeated Bobby Dempsey (ROH) [3] | Hashimoto Legacy Cup 2010 Block A Match | 08:04 |
| 6 | Ryan Sawyer (WORLD-1) [6] defeated Damian Dragon (WORLD-1) [4] | Hashimoto Legacy Cup 2010 Block B Match | — |
| 7 | GPS (c), Colby Corino, and Roxie Cotton defeated Reiko DMF, Richard Guille and Sumie Sakai (with Denver Street (c)) | Mixed Six-Man Tag Team match; As per the pre-match stipulations, the losing team captain (Denver Street) had to leave WORLD-1 for one year. | 12:41 |
| 8 | Chris Rockwell (c) defeated Steve Corino | Singles match for the WORLD-1 Heavyweight Championship | 17:01 |
| 9 | Adam Cole defeated Ryan Sawyer | Hashimoto Legacy Cup 2010 Final match | 12:59 |
(c) / – the champion(s) heading into the match

=== Tournament brackets ===
The Shinya Hashimoto Memorial Legacy Cup was a round-robin tournament consisting of two six-man blocks, and running from September 12 to December 5, 2010.

Final standings
| Block A | | Block B | |
| Adam Cole | 8 | Ryan Sawyer | 6 |
| Bobby Dempsey | 3 | Damian Dragon | 4 |
| Original Monster C | 3 | Sam Shields | 2 |
| Kid America | 2 | Super Sweet | 0 |

| Block A | Adam Cole | Original Monster C | Kid America | Bobby Dempsey |
|---|---|---|---|---|
| Adam Cole | X | Original Monster C (10:59) | Adam Cole (n/a) | Adam Cole (8:04) |
| Original Monster C | Original Monster C (10:59) | X | Kid America (6:35) | DCO (n/a) |
| Kid America | Adam Cole (n/a) | Kid America (6:35) | X | Bobby Dempsey (9:34) |
| Bobby Dempsey | Adam Cole (8:04) | DCO (n/a) | Bobby Dempsey (9:34) | X |
| Block B | Damian Dragon | Sam Shields | Super Sweet | Ryan Sawyer |
| Damian Dragon | X | Damian Dragon (14:39) | Damian Dragon (n/a) | Ryan Sawyer (n/a) |
| Sam Shields | Damian Dragon (14:39) | X | Sam Shields (6:53) | Ryan Sawyer (n/a) |
| Super Sweet | Damian Dragon (n/a) | Sam Shields (6:53) | X | Ryan Sawyer (6:14) |
| Ryan Sawyer | Ryan Sawyer (n/a) | Ryan Sawyer (n/a) | Ryan Sawyer (6:14) | X |

| Final |
| A1 | Adam Cole | Pin |
| B1 | Ryan Sawyer | 12:59 |
