= Chie Ishii =

Japanese professional wrestler

Chie
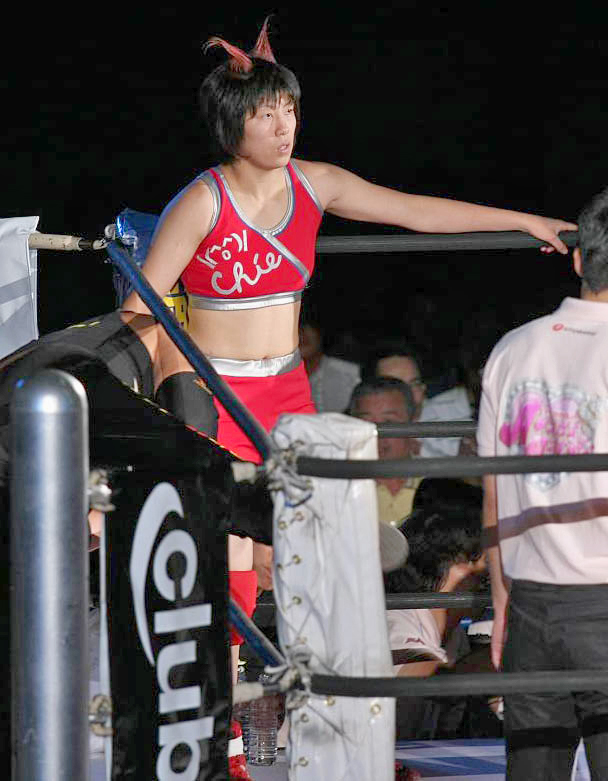
- Chie in July 2008.

Personal information
- Born: Chie Ishii; April 5, 1983 (age 43) Nagano, Japan

Professional wrestling career
- Ring name(s): \(^o^)/ Chie; Chie Ishii
- Billed height: 1.68 m (5 ft 6 in)
- Billed weight: 64 kg (141 lb)
- Trained by: Yoshihiro Tajiri
- Debut: October 9, 2006
- Retired: April 29, 2009

Chie Ishii (石井 千恵, Ishii Chie; born April 5, 1983) is a Japanese retired professional wrestler, better known for her ring name Banzai Chie (stylised as \(^o^)/ Chie (＼(^o^)／チエ, Banzai Chie)). She is known for her work in Hustle.

== Background ==
Chie first competed as a decorated amateur wrestler in high school, reaching third place in the Junior Olympic Cup. In 2006, after graduating from Shigakkan University, Ishii was signed by Dream Stage Entertainment and moved to the Hustle promotion.

== Professional wrestling career ==
=== Hustle (2005-2009) ===
She debuted in 2005 as a member of the face stable Hustle Army, going under the name of Banzai Chie (＼(^o^)／チエ, \(^o^)/ Chie), which was unique for using a Japanese emoticon meaning "banzai". She was introduced as an apprentice to Tajiri, serving as his valet, and later teamed with Tajiri's next protégé, Kushida.

In 2007, she feuded with Monster Army member Giant Vabo and allied with model Hitomi Kaikawa, though being defeated in several occasions. The feud ended in February 2008, when Chie defeated Vabo in a singles match. As Kushida focused in his confrontation with Ray Ohara, Chie then formed a tag team with the new HUSTLE Army recruit, her kohai KG. However, during a tag match, KG accidentally kicked Chie in the head, causing the team to lose. At the next show, the two were teaming up again when suddenly Chie turned on her and mercilessly attacked KG, causing the two to feud.

Chie won their first match and badmouthed her after the bout, but one month later, KG retaliated by beating her in the rematch. Chie, impressed with her effort, reconciled with her and the two hugged in an emotional moment. The same night, Chie announced that she would be retiring from wrestling to get married. Her retirement match was stipulated against her mentor Tajiri, but was changed to a trios match when the Monster Army interfered and KG came to her aid. In Chie's last match, she, KG and Tajiri defeated Ohara, Commander An Jo and Blue Onigumo. Shortly after, Chie was released from her contract.

== Mixed martial arts record ==
Professional record breakdown
1 match	1 win	0 losses
By knockout	1	0

Res.	Record	Opponent	Method	Event	Date	Round	Time	Location	Notes
Win	1–0	Miyuki Ariga	TKO (punches)	G-Shooto: Wrestle Expo 2006	August 19, 2006	1	4:08	Tokyo, Japan	
