= List of mixed martial arts attendance records =

List of the largest attendances in the history of mixed martial arts

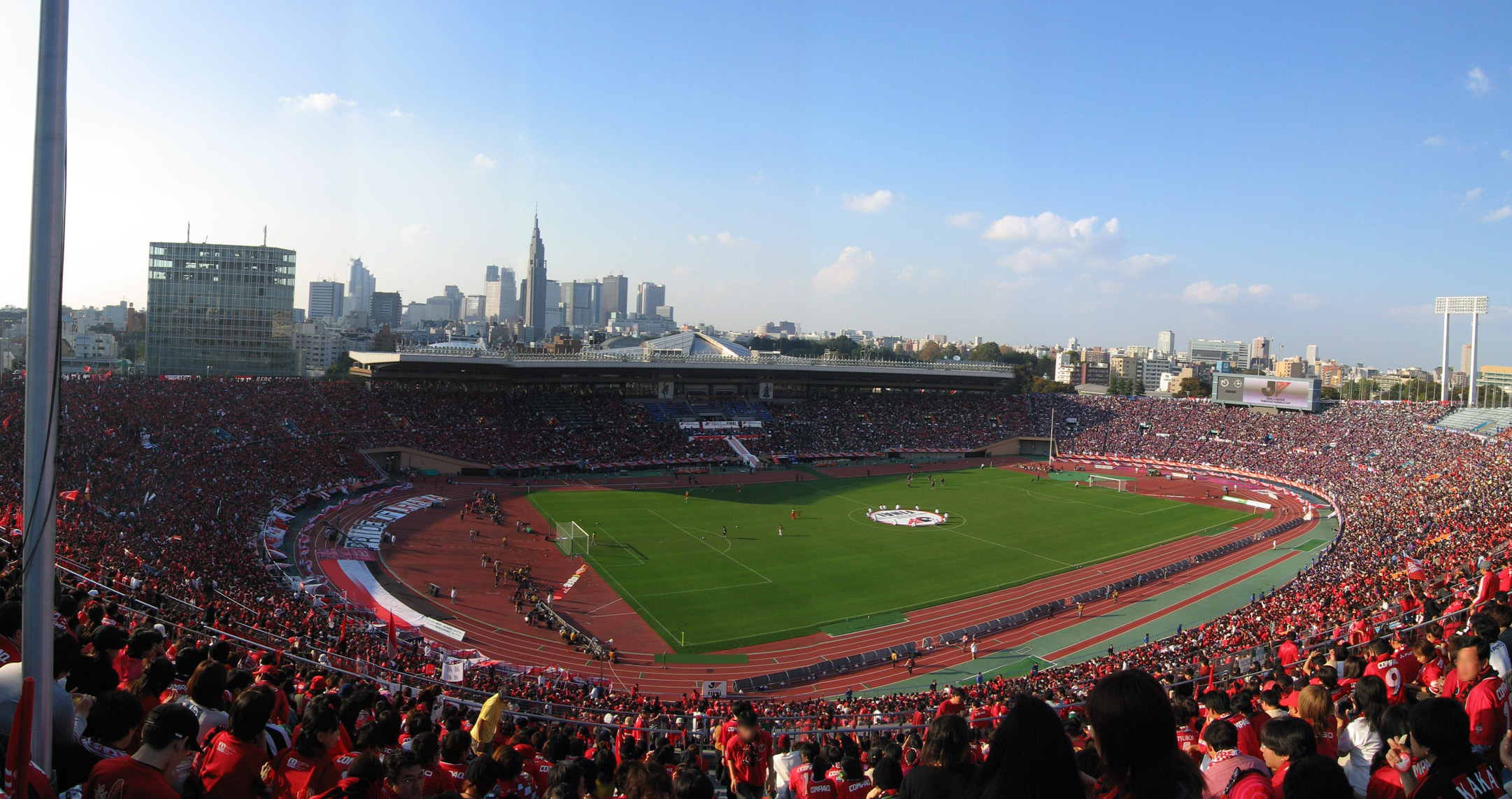
The National Stadium hosted Shockwave in 2002, a supercard event co-promoted by PRIDE and K-1. The event was attended by a crowd of 91,107, the largest attendance in the history of mixed martial arts.

The following is a list of mixed martial arts attendance records. The highest number of events on the list have been promoted by the Pride Fighting Championships (PRIDE), the largest mixed martial arts (MMA) promotion company in Japan until 2007.

Shockwave in August 2002, an event co-promoted by PRIDE and K-1 at the National Stadium, was attended by 91,107 spectators. (Note: The attendance for Shockwave is disputed. Some sources list the attendance of the event at 71,000 spectators.) This remains the largest attendance in the history of MMA.

== Events and attendances ==
Note: Minimum attendance of 30,000.

Promotion	Event	Venue	Attendance	Headline fight	Ref.
PRIDE / K-1	Shockwave; August 28, 2002	National Stadium; Tokyo, Japan	91,107	Mirko Cro Cop vs. Kazushi Sakuraba	
K-1	K-1 World Grand Prix 2000 Final; December 10, 2000	Tokyo Dome; Tokyo, Japan	70,200 (Note: The attendance for the K-1 World Grand Prix 2000 Final is disputed. Some sources list the attendance of the event at 65,000 spectators.)	Frank Shamrock vs. Elvis Sinosic (Note: This event featured both MMA and kickboxing. Frank Shamrock vs. Elvis Sinosic was the final MMA fight featured on the event but the overall final fight was Ernesto Hoost vs. Ray Sefo under kickboxing rules.)	
PRIDE	Final Conflict 2003; November 9, 2003	Tokyo Dome; Tokyo, Japan	67,451 (Note: The attendance for Final Conflict 2003 is disputed. Some sources list the attendance of the event at 53,000 spectators.)	Wanderlei Silva vs. Quinton Jackson	
—	Bridge of Dreams; April 2, 1995	Tokyo Dome; Tokyo, Japan	60,000 (Note: The attendance for Bridge of Dreams is disputed. Some sources list the attendance of the event at 50,000 spectators)	Minoru Suzuki vs. Christopher DeWeaver (Note: This event featured both MMA and professional wrestling. Minoru Suzuki vs. Christopher DeWeaver was the final MMA fight featured on the event but the overall final fight was Shinya Hashimoto vs. Masahiro Chono under professional wrestling rules.)	
Oktagon MMA	Oktagon 62: Bigger Than Ever; October 12, 2024	Deutsche Bank Park; Frankfurt, Germany	59,148	Christian Eckerlin vs. Christian Jungwirth	
KSW	KSW 39: Colosseum; May 27, 2017	PGE Narodowy; Warsaw, Poland	57,776	Mamed Khalidov vs. Borys Mańkowski	
UFC	UFC 243: Whittaker vs. Adesanya; October 6, 2019	Marvel Stadium; Melbourne, Australia	57,127	Robert Whittaker vs. Israel Adesanya	
UFC	UFC 193: Rousey vs. Holm; November 14, 2015	Marvel Stadium; Melbourne, Australia	56,214	Ronda Rousey vs. Holly Holm	
UFC	UFC 129: St-Pierre vs. Shields; April 30, 2011	Rogers Centre; Toronto, Ontario, Canada	55,724	Georges St-Pierre vs. Jake Shields	
PRIDE	PRIDE 17: Championship Chaos; November 3, 2001	Tokyo Dome; Tokyo, Japan	53,246	Wanderlei Silva vs. Kazushi Sakuraba	
K-1 / Hero's	K-1 PREMIUM 2005 Dynamite!! December 31, 2005	Osaka Dome; Osaka, Japan	53,025	Norifumi Yamamoto vs. Genki Sudo	
K-1	K-1 PREMIUM 2004 Dynamite!! December 31, 2004	Osaka Dome; Osaka, Japan	52,918 (Note: The attendance for K-1 PREMIUM 2004 Dynamite!! is disputed. Some sources list the attendance of the event at 52,914 spectators.)	Royce Gracie vs. Akebono Tarō	
PRIDE	PRIDE 23: Championship Chaos 2 November 24, 2002	Tokyo Dome; Tokyo, Japan	52,228	Kazushi Sakuraba vs. Gilles Arsene	
K-1 / Hero's	K-1 PREMIUM 2006 Dynamite!! December 31, 2006	Kyocera Dome Osaka; Osaka, Japan	51,930	Kazushi Sakuraba vs. Yoshihiro Akiyama	
KSW	XTB KSW 83: Colosseum 2 June 3, 2023	PGE Narodowy; Warsaw, Poland	50,000	Mamed Khalidov vs. Scott Askham	
PRIDE	Shockwave 2005; December 31, 2005	Saitama Super Arena; Saitama, Japan	49,801 (Note: The attendance for Shockwave 2005 is disputed. Some sources list the attendance of the event at 35,000 spectators.)	Hidehiko Yoshida vs. Naoya Ogawa	
Rizin FF	Super Rizin 5 September 10, 2026	Kyocera Dome Osaka; Osaka, Japan	49,000	Razhabali Shaydullaev vs. A. J. McKee	
PRIDE	Shockwave 2006; December 31, 2006	Saitama Super Arena; Saitama, Japan	48,709 (Note: The attendance for Shockwave 2006 is disputed. Some sources list the attendance of the event at 35,000 spectators.)	Fedor Emelianenko vs. Mark Hunt	
PRIDE	Shockwave 2004; December 31, 2004	Saitama Super Arena; Saitama, Japan	48,398 (Note: The attendance for Shockwave 2004 is disputed. Some sources list the attendance of the event at 35,000 spectators.)	Fedor Emelianenko vs. Antônio Rodrigo Nogueira	
PRIDE	PRIDE: Grand Prix 2000 - Opening Round; January 30, 2000	Tokyo Dome; Tokyo, Japan	48,316	Royce Gracie vs. Nobuhiko Takada	
Rizin FF	Super Rizin 3 July 28, 2024	Saitama Super Arena; Saitama, Japan	48,117	Ren Hiramoto vs. Mikuru Asakura	
K-1 / Hero's	K-1 PREMIUM 2007 Dynamite!! December 31, 2007	Kyocera Dome Osaka; Osaka, Japan	47,928	Kazushi Sakuraba vs. Masakatsu Funaki	
PRIDE	KRS-PRIDE 1 October 11, 1997	Tokyo Dome; Tokyo, Japan	47,860 (Note: The attendance for KRS-PRIDE 1 is disputed. Some sources list the attendance of the event at 37,000 spectators.)	Rickson Gracie vs. Nobuhiko Takada	
PRIDE	Final Conflict 2004; August 15, 2004	Saitama Super Arena; Saitama, Japan	47,629 (Note: The attendance for Final Conflict 2004 is disputed. Some sources list the attendance of the event at 35,000 spectators.)	Fedor Emelianenko vs. Antônio Rodrigo Nogueira	
K-1 / DREAM / SRC	Dynamite!! 2009; December 31, 2009	Saitama Super Arena; Saitama, Japan	45,606 (Note: The attendance for Dynamite!! 2009 is disputed. Some sources list the attendance of the event at 35,000 spectators.)	Ikuhisa Minowa vs. Rameau Thierry Sokoudjou	
PRIDE	Total Elimination 2005; April 23, 2005	Osaka Dome; Osaka, Japan	45,423 (Note: The attendance for Total Elimination 2005 is disputed. Some sources list the attendance of the event at 43,000 spectators.)	Wanderlei Silva vs. Hidehiko Yoshida	
UFC	UFC 198: Werdum vs. Miocic; May 14, 2016	Arena da Baixada; Curitiba, Brazil	45,207	Fabrício Werdum vs. Stipe Miocic	
PRIDE	Critical Countdown 2004; June 20, 2004	Saitama Super Arena; Saitama, Japan	43,721	Fedor Emelianenko vs. Kevin Randleman	
Rizin FF	Otoko Matsuri; May 4, 2025	Tokyo Dome; Tokyo, Japan	42,706	Kleber Koike Erbst vs. Razhabali Shaydullaev	
PRIDE	Total Elimination 2004; April 25, 2004	Saitama Super Arena; Saitama, Japan	42,110 (Note: The attendance for Total Elimination 2004 is disputed. Some sources list the attendance of the event at 35,000 spectators.)	Fedor Emelianenko vs. Mark Coleman	
PRIDE	Total Elimination 2003; August 10, 2003	Saitama Super Arena; Saitama, Japan	40,316 (Note: The attendance for Total Elimination 2003 is disputed. Some sources list the attendance of the event at 35,000 spectators.)	Wanderlei Silva vs. Kazushi Sakuraba	
—	Colosseum 2000; May 26, 2000	Tokyo Dome; Tokyo, Japan	40,240 (Note: The attendance for Colosseum 2000 is disputed. Some sources list the attendance of the event at 25,000 spectators.)	Masakatsu Funaki vs. Rickson Gracie	
PRIDE	PRIDE: Grand Prix 2000 - Finals; May 1, 2000	Tokyo Dome; Tokyo, Japan	38,429 (Note: The attendance for the PRIDE: Grand Prix 2000 - Finals is disputed. Some sources list the attendance of the event at 38,000 spectators.)	Mark Coleman vs. Igor Vovchanchyn	
PRIDE	Shockwave 2003; December 31, 2003	Saitama Super Arena; Saitama, Japan	36,716 (Note: The attendance for Shockwave 2003 is disputed. Some sources list the attendance of the event at 35,000 spectators.)	Kazushi Sakuraba vs. Antônio Rogério Nogueira	
—	Inoki Bom-Ba-Ye 2002; December 31, 2002	Saitama Super Arena; Saitama, Japan	35,674	Bob Sapp vs. Yoshihiro Takayama	
—	Inoki Bom-Ba-Ye 2001; December 31, 2001	Saitama Super Arena; Saitama, Japan	35,492	Tadao Yasuda vs. Jérôme Le Banner	
PRIDE	PRIDE 10: Return of the Warriors; August 27, 2000	Seibu Dome; Saitama, Japan	35,000 (Note: The attendance for PRIDE 10: Return of the Warriors is disputed. Some sources list the attendance of the event at 32,919 spectators, while other list it at 38,429 spectators.)	Kazushi Sakuraba vs. Renzo Gracie	
UFC	UFC on FOX 14: Gustafsson vs. Johnson; January 24, 2015	Tele2 Arena; Stockholm, Sweden	30,000	Alexander Gustafsson vs. Anthony Johnson	
