= Deep (mixed martial arts) =

Japanese mixed martial arts

- Type: Private
- Industry: Mixed martial arts promotion
- Founded: 2001; 25 years ago
- Founder: Shigeru Saeki
- Headquarters: Nagoya, Japan
- Website: http://www.deep2001.com

Deep (previously Deep2001) is a Japan-based mixed martial arts promoting and sanctioning organization. It is promoted by Shigeru Saeki who is also the former Public Relations Director of Pride Fighting Championships. Their inaugural event took place in 2001 and featured Paulo Filho and Royler Gracie.

Originally founded in 2001 as an independent promotion, Deep became closely associated with Pride Fighting Championships during the 2000s, serving as a developmental platform for Japanese fighters, particularly through Pride Bushido. The promotion also provided a venue for fighters from Japan's major MMA organizations, including Shooto and Pancrase, to compete against one another. Following the closure of Pride in 2007, Deep continued to operate independently and became one of Japan's longest-running MMA promotions. It subsequently expanded into other formats and promotions, including DEEP X for grappling, DEEP JEWELS for women's MMA, and DEEP TOKYO IMPACT as a regional event series.

== History ==
Deep was established in 2000 as "Deep2001", and the first event was promoted on January 8, 2001. It was founded by businessman Shigeru Saeki, who owned a commercial/magazine photographer and publisher named DEEP International. In 2003, Deep2001 changed its name to simply Deep.

Deep started playing the role of a subcontractor for Pride Fighting Championships since Dream Stage Entertainment (DSE) started promoting the Pride Bushido series in September 2003, which focused training Japanese fighters at middleweight and lightweight. As a result, a number of Japanese fighters, such as Ryo Chonan and Ikuhisa Minowa, started their careers fighting in DEEP before moving on to larger and more famous MMA promotions.

Deep is also known as one of the few major Japanese organizations to cultivate Korean talent, including Dong Hyun Kim, Chan Sung Jung, and Doo Ho Choi - all of which have moved on to successful careers in the Ultimate Fighting Championship.

Deep began promoting bouts with female fighters at its 13th event on July 13, 2003.

On February 22, 2008, Deep implemented the weight division system created by Nevada State Athletic Commission (NSAC) for its male fighters.

Following the closure of Pride in 2007 and the formation of Dream in 2008, Deep expanded its cooperation with other Japanese promotions. On May 17, 2008, Deep announced a partnership with ZST to share fighters, co-promote shows and eventually unify the promotions. With the partnership intended to develop talent for Dream.

On December 19, 2009, Deep started to use a UFC-style octagon for their Cage Impact events.

At a press conference held in Macau on December 1, 2010, DEEP announced its first international event, which was to be held in Macau in 2011. However, low levels of interest and dismal tickets sales led DEEP to cancel the event. Deep has yet to host an event outside Japan.

In February 2011, it was announced that Deep and the MMA division of Smash had formed an amateur promotion named the Japan MMA League (JML).

=== Deep Jewels ===
On May 25, 2013 the all-female MMA promotion Jewels announced that it would cease operations as an independent company, with Yuichi Ozono, then head of Jewels, stepping down and Shigeru Saeki from Deep, formerly supervisor, taking the full direction, and transferring fighters and brand to the new Deep Jewels brand, which would be managed by Deep.

== Events ==
As of April 16, 2013, Deep has held a total of 194 events comprising 2202 fights, all of which have taken place in Japan. As of December 23, 2013, two events of the all-female fighters brand Deep Jewels have been held.

== Current champions ==
Men: Deep
Division	Champion	Since	Defenses
Megatonweight	(Guam) Roque Martinez	July 15, 2017	3
Heavyweight	Vacant		–
Middleweight	(Brazil) Joao Batista Yoshimura	Jul 4, 2021	0
Welterweight	(Japan) Yoichiro Sato	Jul 14, 2024	0
Lightweight	(Japan) Kimihiro Eto	Mar 9, 2024	0
Featherweight	(Japan) Jin Aoi	Mar 9, 2024	0
Bantamweight	Vacant	Mar 30, 2024	–
Flyweight	(Japan) Ryuya Fukuda	Mar 29, 2024	1
Strawweight	(Japan) Haruo Ochi	May 26, 2024	0

Women: Deep
Division	Champion	Since	Defenses
Openweight	(United States) Amanda Lucas	Febr 18, 2012	0
Atomweight	Vacant	Mar 9, 2019	–
Microweight	(Japan) Saori Oshima	Sep 20, 2020	1

== Broadcasters ==
Deep Based out of Nagoya, Japan. Broadcast their fights locally on SKY PerfecTV! (Fighting TV Samurai channel) and streaming on AbemaTV.

== See also ==
- List of Deep champions
- List of Deep events
- Deep Jewels events
- Jewels (mixed martial arts)
