= Yinling =

Taiwanese wrestler and model (born 1976)

Yinling (垠凌)
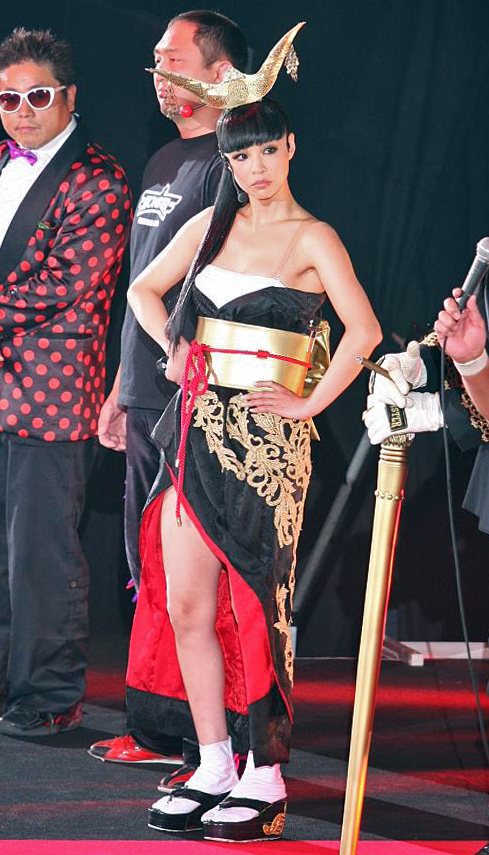
- Yinling at the Hustle 30 in April 2008.

Background information
- Born: February 15, 1976 (age 50); Taipei, Taiwan
- Occupations: Model; Entertainer
- Website: mostsexy.net

Yan Yinling (simplified Chinese: 颜垠凌; traditional Chinese: 顔垠凌; pinyin: Yán Yínlíng or in Japanese, Inrin (インリン); born February 15, 1976) is a Taiwanese-born, Japan-based swimsuit model, race queen, singer, and former professional wrestler. She is called also Yinling of Joytoy (インリン・オブ・ジョイトイ), when she appears on television.

== Biography ==
=== Career ===
She began modelling at 16 and started working with photographer Hiraokanovsky Kuratachenko at 19, forming the duo JOYTOY. Kuratachenko is suspected to be in fact Japanese, but he is often labeled a Russian photographer. Much of their work is politically themed, often infused with symbols and references to communism and the Soviet Union. JOYTOY's campaign has been noteworthy for being overly sexual and provocative in nature. A notable example was an exhibit that was hosted in the National Museum of History (ROC) in 2004. The exhibit took the form of an anti-war and anti-prejudice art display of mildly erotic photography.

In 2008, Yinling published an autobiography by the title LOVE ERO-Terrorism/Yinling of JOYTOY. In that same year, she provided the voice for Libido Waterfall, a tertiary character in video game Ryū ga Gotoku Kenzan! who was modeled after Yinling.

=== Professional wrestling ===
Yinling also appeared for the professional wrestling promotion Hustle, a venture led by Nobuhiko Takada. She originally appeared under the heel alias "Yinling the Erotic Terrorist", but then appeared as a face, under the name Newling-sama (Mistress Newling), who was in storyline the Erotic Terrorist's daughter.

=== Personal life ===
In 2007, a scandal resulted in Yinling being accused of having ties to the yakuza. Her management has denied the accusations.

Yinling is a supporter of the Social Democratic Party of Japan which advocates for social welfare reform and alternatives to nuclear energy. In 2010, she attended a conference held by Mizuho Fukushima and spoke of the party's policies.

In 2008, she announced her marriage to an anonymous employee of the ZERO1-MAX wrestling agency. In 2010, she revealed that she had given birth to her first child, a son. She currently lives in Taiwan.

== Championships and accomplishments ==
- Tokyo Sports
  - Topic Award (2005)

== Discography ==
- Gumin no Koi (2003)
- Ai wa Maboroshi (2005)

== See also ==
- List of race queens
