= Hustle (professional wrestling) =

Japanese professional wrestling promotion

- Acronym: Hustle
- Founded: 2004
- Defunct: October 10, 2009
- Style: "Fighting Opera"
- Founder: Nobuhiko Takada
- Owner: Hustle Entertainment
- Successor: Smash

Hustle (ハッスル, Hassuru) was a Japanese professional wrestling promotion managed by Nobuhiko Takada. Hustle can be described as an industry experiment to market the sports entertainment style of professional wrestling in Japan.

== History ==
Booked primarily by Nobuhiko Takada and Yuji Shimada, the promotion's basic premise pits the babyface, or good guy, Hustle faction whose goal is to “defend the industry”, against Generalissimo Takada's heel, or bad guy, Monster Faction, whose mission is to destroy the sport. Unlike the traditional puroresu, the company emphasizes melodrama and caricatures over realism and athleticism. The group once maintained a close affiliation with mixed martial arts promoters PRIDE Fighting Championships when both were owned by Dream Stage Entertainment, or DSE.

Fans in the U.S. considered HUSTLE to be an answer to Takada's original wrestling style, the serious shoot style, having lost its popularity in Japan as a result of the UWFi vs. New Japan Pro-Wrestling feud and the rise of Pride and K-1.

On April 24, 2007, Hustle's ownership group (made up of former DSE employees) became "Hustle Entertainment" and former Kami no Puroresu editor Noboru Yamaguchi (who was part of the original Hustle brain trust) became President of the new organization. The group is still running their business at the old Dream Stage Entertainment offices, which became the PRIDE Worldwide Holding offices.

Earlier in 2007, Hustle ran a storyline where General Takada bought out Hustle for 1 billion Monster dollars and that everyone within the Hustle army became part of the Takada Monster Army. Some wrestlers received new gimmicks, like Naoya Ogawa turning into "Celeb" Ogawa, where he acted like a celebrity. The storyline was in response to DSE's bleak future due to financial troubles caused by yakuza scandals; DSE would eventually close doors after Pride Fighting Championships was officially bought out by Zuffa (the organization that owned UFC at the time).

In July 2009, the leader of the Monster Army, Generalissimo Takada was "killed" when a new enemy by the name of "King RIKI" (played by actor/singer Riki Takeuchi) showed up at the "HUSTLE AID 2009" event and repelled one of Takada's lasers, sending it back towards him and wounding him. The following show the Monster Army was disbanded, as the direction of the company started to change.

In August 2009, President Noburo Yamaguchi stated that Hustle would be entering a new era. Straying away from the over the top storylines & gimmick-oriented "Fighting Opera" style that made them popular, to a more traditional wrestling "Professional Fighting" style.

Hustle president Nobuo Yamaguchi announced on October 28 that the promotion was folding. He made the announcement that they were out of money, and could no longer pay the staff and the wrestlers. He said that the scheduled 10/29 show at Korakuen Hall was canceled, as are all the rest of the shows on the schedule. Since Nobuhiko Takada left the promotion as the top heel, interest had gone way down. Many of the shows were before small crowds, and most of those crowds were papered. While nobody would say so publicly, they were behind on paying a lot of the wrestlers, and the demise of the promotion has been expected for the last couple of months. Yamaguchi said his goal was to eventually bring the promotion back. Wataru Sakata still runs Hustle shows under the banner "HUSTLE Man's World", with wrestler @UEXIL as the main eventer; however, they're only run sporadically and at the small venue Shin-Kiba FIRST Ring (approx. 250 capacity), without television exposure and attendance figures not posted.

In the beginning of 2010 some of Hustle's biggest names announced that they would be forming a new promotion, Smash, intended to replace the dead promotion. Smash held its first show on March 26, 2010. After a six-month hiatus, Hustle held two shows on April 30 and May 30, 2010. After another four-month break, the promotion held two more shows in October. In 2011, the Bleacher Report ranked Hustle No.13 on its list of the 25 worst professional wrestling promotions in history.

== Final roster ==
=== Hustle Union Army ===
- Magnum Tokyo (formerly "Detective" Alan Kuroki) - inactive
- Toshiaki Kawada - freelancer, inactive since 2010
- "Karate Girl" KG
- \(^o^)/ Chie (pronounced "Banzai Chie") - retired
- Punch the C - returned to NOAH, inactive since 2013
- Akira Shoji (formerly Private Shoji) - jumped to Smash, returned to MMA in 2011

=== Riki Army ===
- King Riki - inactive
- Wataru Sakata - promoted successor promotion Hustle Man's World until 2011, went into inactivity
- Genichiro Tenryu - formed Tenryu Project, retired in 2015
- Yoji Anjo - inactive; retired in 2015 in a six-man match
- Riki Choshu - inactive, retired in 2019
- Yoshihiro Takayama - inactive since 2017 due to career-ending injury; freelancer

== Alumni ==
Deceased individuals are indicated with a dagger (†).

- “Generalissimo” Takada (Nobuhiko Takada)
- The Esperanza (Occasional)
- "Hard Gay" HG
- "Real Gay" RG
- Bono-kun (Akebono) (formerly Monster Bono/Bono-Chan) †
- Monster C
- Nise HG (Fake HG) (Keizo Matsuda)
- Hiroshi Nagao (formerly "Giant Voba")- Retired in late 2008
- "Hustle Buzzsaw" Tajiri
- "Hustle Supernova" Kushida
- Rey Ohara
- Naoya Ogawa
- Shinya Hashimoto †
- "The Erotic Terrorist" Yinling
- Abdullah the Butcher (Occasional)
- Tiger Jeet Singh (Occasional)
- Bob Sapp
- Scott Norton
- Bill Goldberg (one time)
- Giant Silva
- Rene Bonaparte
- Tiger Jeet Singh Jr.
- The Great Muta
- Zeus (Osaka Pro)
- A-chan (Nobutaka Araya)
- Yoshie-chan (Yutaka Yoshie) †
- "Fire Monster" Shinjiro Otani
- "Super Cyborg" Ryouji Sai
- "Monster K'" Kohei Sato
- Yosei (Wataru Sakata's Wife)
- Keroro Gunsou
- Erica (Aja Kong)
- Dump Matsumoto
- Minoru Suzuki
- Warren Cromartie
- Randleman †
- Coleman
- Kurodaman
- Mitsuyaman (Mitsuya Nagai)
- Nosawa Rongai
- Mazada
- Masato Tanaka
- Sodom & Gomora
- Tadao Yasuda
- Team 3D (Brother Ray and Brother Devon)
- The Neo Devil Pierrots 1 & 2
- Flying Vampire 16 & 23 & 25 & 28
- Madama Devil (Devil Masami) (parody of Madama Butterfly and Dewi Sukarno)
- Kaz Hayashi
- Margaret (Amazing Kong)
- "Hustle I" Taichi Ishikari
- Hirotaka Yokoi
- Arisin Z (Ayako Hamada)
- Blanca X (Saki Maemura)
- Caiya
- Demon Spider
- Jaguar Y (Jaguar Yokota)
- Monster C (Steve Corino)
- Monster J (Sonjay Dutt)
- Seiichi Kusama
- Kei Sasahara
- Kyo Itako
- Kidata-Low
- Fujin & Raijin
- Count Poisonous Cobra
- Monster MAX (Maximum Capacity) †
- Super Virus

=== Hustle Kamen ===
- Hustle Kamen Blue
- Hustle Kamen Green (Lil' Nate)
- Hustle Kamen Red
- Hustle Kamen Pink
- Hustle Kamen Yellow
- Hustle Kamen Orange
- Hustle Kamen Silver
- Hustle Kamen Gold

== Championships ==
No.	Championship	Date of entry	First champion(s)	Date retired	Final champion(s)	Years active	Notes
1	Hustle Hardcore Hero Championship	March 18, 2005	Masato Tanaka	October 10, 2009	Tadao Yasuda	4 years, 206 days	Title abandoned on October 10, 2009, when promotion shuts down.
2	Hustle Super Tag Team Championship	November 3, 2005	Genichiro Tenryu and Tadao Yasuda	October 10, 2009	Team 3D (Brother Ray and Brother Devon)	3 years, 341 days	Title abandoned on October 10, 2009, when promotion shuts down.

=== Hustle Hardcore Hero Championship ===
The Hustle Hardcore Hero Championship (also referred to as the HHH Championship) was the top championship in the Japanese professional wrestling promotion Hustle. The title was more of a joke title since the Hustle promotion was never meant to be taken seriously. The title was represented by a giant gold and black spiked baseball bat.

Key
No.	Overall reign number
Reign	Reign number for the specific champion
Days	Number of days held

No.	Champion	Championship change			Reign statistics		Notes	Ref.
No.	Champion	Date	Event	Location	Reign	Days	Notes	Ref.
1	Masato Tanaka	March 18, 2005	Hustle 8	Tokyo, Japan	1	176	Won an eight-man battle royal, last eliminating Wataru Sakata, to become the first champion. Other participants included Giant Silva, Dan Bobish, The Flying Vampire XVI, Kintaro Kanemura, Tetsuhiro Kuroda and Leonardo Spanky.	
2	Tadao Yasuda	September 10, 2005	Hustle 12	Nagoya, Japan	1	1,491	This was a six-man battle royal also involving Monster C, King Giraffa, Quick Cook Lee and Tetsuhiro Kuroda.	
—	Deactivated	October 10, 2009	—	—	—	—	Championship deactivated when Hustle folded.	

=== Hustle Super Tag Team Championship ===
The Hustle Super Tag Team Championship was the tag team championship in the Japanese professional wrestling promotion Hustle.

Key
No.	Overall reign number
Reign	Reign number for the specific team—reign numbers for the individuals are in parentheses, if different
Days	Number of days held

No.	Champion	Championship change			Reign statistics		Notes	Ref.
No.	Champion	Date	Event	Location	Reign	Days	Notes	Ref.
1	Tadao Yasuda and Genichiro Tenryu	November 3, 2005	Hustle Mania 2005	Yokohama, Japan	1	122	Defeated Kintaro Kanemura and Masato Tanaka to win the inaugural title.	
2	Wakaru Sakata and Ryoji Sai	March 5, 2006	Hustle 14	Yokohama, Japan	1	104		
3	Erica and Margaret	June 17, 2006	Hustle Aid 2006	Saitama, Japan	1	114		
4	Team 3D (Bubba Ray and Devon)	October 9, 2006	Hustle 20	Nagoya, Japan	1	1,097	This was three-way tag team match also involving Sodom and Gomorrah.	
—	Deactivated	October 10, 2009	—	—	—	—	Championship deactivated when Hustle folded.	

== Events ==
#	Event title	Date	Location
1	HUSTLE 1	January 4, 2004	Saitama, Japan
2	HUSTLE 2	March 7, 2004	Yokohama, Japan
3	HUSTLE 3	May 8, 2004	Yokohama, Japan
4	HUSTLE House Vol. 1	June 28, 2004	Tokyo, Japan
5	HUSTLE 4	July 25, 2004	Yokohama, Japan
6	HUSTLE House Vol. 2	September 2, 2004	Tokyo, Japan
7	HUSTLE 5	September 20, 2004	Yokohama, Japan
8	HUSTLE House Vol. 3	October 21, 2004	Tokyo, Japan
9	HUSTLE 6	October 23, 2004	Nagoya, Japan
10	HUSTLE House: Christmas Special - Night 1	December 24, 2004	Tokyo, Japan
11	HUSTLE House: Christmas Special - Night 2	December 25, 2004	Tokyo, Japan
12	HUSTLE House Vol. 4	February 8, 2005	Tokyo, Japan
13	HUSTLE House Vol. 5	February 9, 2005	Tokyo, Japan
14	HUSTLE 7	February 11, 2005	Nagoya, Japan
15	HUSTLE 8	March 18, 2005	Tokyo, Japan
16	HUSTLE House Vol. 6	March 19, 2005	Shizuoka, Japan
17	HUSTLE 9	May 10, 2005	Niigata, Japan
18	HUSTLE House Vol. 7	May 14, 2005	Sapporo, Japan
19	HUSTLE House Vol. 8	May 15, 2005	Sapporo, Japan
20	HUSTLE 10	July 13, 2005	Fukuoka, Japan
21	HUSTLE 11	July 15, 2005	Osaka, Japan
22	HUSTLE House Vol. 9	September 8, 2005	Tokyo, Japan
23	HUSTLE 12	September 10, 2005	Nagoya, Japan
24	HUSTLE House Vol. 10	October 26, 2005	Tokyo, Japan
25	HUSTLE 13	October 30, 2005	Amori, Japan
26	HUSTLEMANIA	November 3, 2005	Yokohama, Japan
27	HUSTLE House: Christmas Special 2005 - Night 1	December 24, 2005	Tokyo, Japan
28	HUSTLE House: Christmas Special 2005 - Night 2	December 25, 2005	Tokyo, Japan
29	HUSTLE House Vol. 11	February 2, 2006	Tokyo, Japan
30	HUSTLE 14	February 10, 2006	Yokohama, Japan
31	HUSTLE House Vol. 12	March 9, 2006	Tokyo, Japan
32	HUSTLE 15	March 12, 2006	Nagoya, Japan
33	HUSTLE 16	April 20, 2006	Osaka, Japan
34	HUSTLE House Vol. 13	April 22, 2006	Tokyo, Japan
35	HUSTLE House Vol. 14	April 23, 2006	Tokyo, Japan
36	HUSTLE 17	May 13, 2006	Sendai, Japan
37	HUSTLE House Vol. 15: Road To HUSTLE Aid - Night 1	June 10, 2006	Hamamatsu, Japan
38	HUSTLE House Vol. 16: Road To HUSTLE Aid - Night 2	June 15, 2006	Tokyo, Japan
39	HUSTLE Aid: Save The World By Hustling	June 17, 2006	Saitama, Japan
40	HUSTLE 18	July 9, 2006	Yokohama, Japan
41	HUSTLE House Vol. 17: Hustle King Forever	July 11, 2006	Tokyo, Japan
42	HUSTLE House Vol. 18	August 8, 2006	Tokyo, Japan
43	HUSTLE House Vol. 19	August 9, 2006	Tokyo, Japan
44	HUSTLE House Vol. 20	September 7, 2006	Tokyo, Japan
45	HUSTLE 19	October 6, 2006	Osaka, Japan
46	HUSTLE 20	October 9, 2006	Nagoya, Japan
47	HUSTLE House Vol. 21	November 15, 2006	Tokyo, Japan
48	HUSTLEMANIA 2006	November 23, 2006	Yokohama, Japan
49	HUSTLE House: Christmas Special 2006 - Part 1	December 25, 2006	Tokyo, Japan
50	HUSTLE House: Christmas Special 2006 - Part 2	December 26, 2006	Tokyo, Japan
51	HUSTLE House Vol. 22	March 15, 2007	Tokyo, Japan
52	HUSTLE House Vol. 23	March 17, 2007	Tokyo, Japan
53	HUSTLE 21	March 18, 2007	Nagoya, Japan
54	HUSTLE 22	April 21, 2007	Osaka, Japan
55	HUSTLE House Vol. 24	May 9, 2007	Tokyo, Japan
56	HUSTLE 23	June 10, 2007	Aomori, Japan
57	HUSTLE House Vol. 25	June 14, 2007	Tokyo, Japan
58	HUSTLE Aid 2007	June 17, 2007	Saitama, Japan
59	HUSTLE House Vol. 26	July 11, 2007	Tokyo, Japan
60	HUSTLE 24	July 14, 2007	Hamamatsu, Japan
61	HUSTLE House Vol. 27	August 15, 2007	Tokyo, Japan
62	HUSTLE 25	August 18, 2007	Nagoya, Japan
63	HUSTLE House Vol. 28	September 13, 2007	Tokyo, Japan
64	HUSTLE 26	September 22, 2007	Osaka, Japan
65	HUSTLE House Vol. 29	October 10, 2007	Tokyo, Japan
66	HUSTLE House Vol. 30	October 16, 2007	Tokyo, Japan
67	HUSTLE House Vol. 31	October 22, 2007	Tokyo, Japan
68	HUSTLEMANIA 2007	November 25, 2007	Yokohama, Japan
69	HUSTLE House: Christmas Special 2007	December 25, 2007	Tokyo, Japan
70	New Year's Eve: HUSTLE Festival 2007	December 31, 2007	Saitama, Japan
71	HUSTLE 27	January 13, 2008	Nagoya, Japan
72	HUSTLE House Vol. 32	January 17, 2008	Tokyo, Japan
73	HUSTLE House Vol. 33	February 21, 2008	Tokyo, Japan
74	HUSTLE 28	February 24, 2008	Saitama, Japan
75	HUSTLE House Vol. 34	March 17, 2008	Tokyo, Japan
76	HUSTLE 29	March 20, 2008	Osaka, Japan
77	HUSTLE 30	April 13, 2008	Tokyo, Japan
78	HUSTLE House Vol. 35	April 16, 2008	Tokyo, Japan
79	HUSTLE House Vol. 36	May 13, 2008	Tokyo, Japan
80	HUSTLE Aid 2008	May 24, 2008	Tokyo, Japan
81	HUSTLE House Vol. 37	June 18, 2008	Tokyo, Japan
82	HUSTLE Tour 2008 - Night 1	July 6, 2008	Fukuoka, Japan
83	HUSTLE Tour 2008 - Night 2	July 7, 2007	Tokyo, Japan
84	HUSTLE Tour 2008 - Night 3	July 27, 2008	Yokohama, Japan
85	HUSTLE Tour 2008 - Night 4	August 23, 2008	Osaka, Japan
86	HUSTLE Tour 2008 - Night 5	September 19, 2008	Tokyo, Japan
87	HUSTLE Tour 2008 - Night 6	September 28, 2009	Nagoya, Japan
88	HUSTLE Tour 2008 - Night 7	October 16, 2008	Tokyo, Japan
89	HUSTLE Tour 2008 - Night 8	October 26, 2008	Kiyohara, Japan
90	HUSTLE Tour 2008 - Night 9	November 20, 2008	Tokyo, Japan
91	HUSTLE Tour 2008 - Night 10	November 22, 2008	Mito, Japan
92	HUSTLE Tour 2008: Christmas Special Part 1	December 24, 2008	Tokyo, Japan
93	HUSTLE Tour 2008: Christmas Special Part 2	December 25, 2008	Tokyo, Japan
94	HUSTLEMANIA 2008	December 30, 2008	Tokyo, Japan
95	HUSTLE Tour 2009 - Night 1	January 29, 2009	Tokyo, Japan
96	HUSTLE Tour 2009 - Night 2	February 19, 2009	Tokyo, Japan
97	HUSTLE Tour 2009 - Night 3	February 22, 2009	Chiba, Japan
98	HUSTLE Tour 2009 - Night 4	March 25, 2009	Tokyo, Japan
99	HUSTLE Tour 2009 - Night 5	April 23, 2009	Tokyo, Japan
100	HUSTLE Tour 2009 - Night 6	April 23, 2009	Tokyo, Japan
101	HUSTLE Tour 2009 - Night 7	April 29, 2009	Nagoya, Japan
102	HUSTLE Tour 2009 - Night 8	May 4, 2009	Yokohama, Japan
103	HUSTLE Tour 2009 - Night 9	May 23, 2009	Soka, Japan
103	HUSTLE Tour 2009 - Night 10	May 27, 2005	Tokyo, Japan
104	HUSTLE Tour 2009 - Night 11	June 25, 2009	Tokyo, Japan
105	HUSTLE Tour 2009 - Night 12	June 27, 2009	Kiryu, Japan
106	HUSTLE Tour 2009 - Night 13	July 5, 2009	Fukuoka, Japan
107	HUSTLE Aid 2009	July 26, 2009	Tokyo, Japan
108	HUSTLE Tour 2009 - Night 14	July 30, 2009	Tokyo, Japan
109	HUSTLE Gaiden: Shiro Koshinaka 30th Anniversary	August 27, 2009	Tokyo, Japan
110	HUSTLE Tour 2009 - Night 15	September 26, 2009	Tokyo, Japan
111	HUSTLE Jihad	October 10, 2009	Tokyo, Japan
112	HUSTLE Jets: Judgement Day	April 30, 2010	Tokyo, Japan
113	HUSTLE Jets: Chapter 2	May 30, 2010	Tokyo, Japan
114	HUSTLE Man's World 1	September 10, 2010	Tokyo, Japan
115	HUSTLE Man's World 2	October 27, 2010	Tokyo, Japan
116	HUSTLE Man's World 3	December 2, 2010	Tokyo, Japan
117	HUSTLE Jets 3: Road to Hustle	December 4, 2010	Tokyo, Japan
118	HUSTLE Jets 4: The Wrestling Year-End Party ~ Revenge!	December 28, 2010	Tokyo, Japan
119	HUSTLE Man's World 4	January 27, 2011	Tokyo, Japan
120	HUSTLE Man's World 5	April 2, 2011	Tokyo, Japan
121	HUSTLE Man's World 6	May 28, 2011	Tokyo, Japan

== See also ==
- Professional wrestling in Japan
