= Weekly Pro Wrestling Tokyo Dome Show =

Professional wrestling and mixed martial arts event

- Promotion: Weekly Pro Wrestling magazine
- Date: April 2, 1995
- City: Tokyo, Japan
- Venue: Tokyo Dome
- Attendance: 50,000

The Weekly Pro Wrestling Tokyo Dome Show, often referred to as Bridge of Dreams (Japanese: 夢の架け橋～憧夢春爛漫～, Hepburn: Yume no Kakehashi: Dōmu Haruranman), was a multi-promotional professional wrestling and mixed martial arts television special event hosted by Japanese wrestling magazine, Weekly Pro Wrestling. The event took place on April 2, 1995 at the Tokyo Dome in Tokyo, Japan.

== Event details ==
The Bridge of Dreams event was a multi-promotional wrestling event organized by the Weekly Pro Wrestling magazine. According to American wrestling journalist Dave Meltzer, the event was only initially supposed to feature the participation of 8 promotions. However, due to increased interest, 13 professional wrestling and mixed martial arts promotions from Japan took part in the event. Genichiro Tenryu's WAR promotion notably did not take part in the event as they had a previously planned event the same day at Korakuen Hall. Weekly Gong, another Japanese wrestling magazine, did not cover Bridge of Dreams, opting instead to cover WAR's event, leading that event to be nicknamed "The Anti-Dream Bridge". Tokyo Sports reported on the event, but did not mention that it was hosted by Weekly Pro Wrestling. Baseball Sha Magazine, a mainstream sports magazine that is the sister company of Weekly Pro Wrestling, briefly covered the event.

The event was not released officially on video due to issues with the companies involved, with only unofficial recordings of the event existing.

== Participating promotions ==
- All Japan Pro Wrestling
- All Japan Women's Pro-Wrestling
- Fighting Network Rings
- Frontier Martial-Arts Wrestling
- Go Gundan
- International Wrestling Association of Japan
- JWP Joshi Puroresu
- Ladies Legend Pro-Wrestling
- Michinoku Pro Wrestling
- New Japan Pro-Wrestling
- Pancrase
- Pro Wrestling Fujiwara Gumi
- UWF International

== Results ==
No.	Results	Stipulations	Times
1	Candy Okutsu, Dynamite Kansai, Fusayo Nochi, and Hikari Fukuoka defeated Cutie Suzuki, Devil Masami, Hiromi Yagi, and Mayumi Ozaki	Eight-woman tag team match	17:29
2	Shinobu Kandori defeated Harley Saito	Ultimate Rules match	1:12
3	Ryuma Go defeated Uchu Majin Silver X	Alien Deathmatch for the vacant Go Gudan Interplanetary Championship	15:11
4	Aja Kong and Kyoko Inoue defeated Blizzard Yuki and Manami Toyota	Tag team match	17:40
5	Minoru Suzuki defeated Christopher DeWeaver	Pancrase Rules match	1:50
6	Leatherface, Shoji Nakamaki, and Terry Funk defeated Headhunter A, Headhunter B, and Cactus Jack	Barbed Wire Board and Barbed Wire Baseball Bat Bunkhouse Deathmatch	18:28
7	Yoshiaki Fujiwara and Yuki Ishikawa defeated Carl Greco and Don Arakawa	Tag team match	16:30
8	Gran Naniwa, Super Delfin, and Taka Michinoku defeated Sato, Shiryu, and The Great Sasuke	Six-man tag team match	22:25
9	Akira Maeda defeated Chris Dolman	Fighting Network Rings Rules match	05:26
10	Nobuhiko Takada, Billy Scott, and Masahito Kakihara defeated Gary Albright, Gene Lydick, and Kazuo Yamazaki	UWF International Rules six-man tag team match	15:17
11	Great Nita defeated Pogo Daioh	No Ropes Exploding Barbed Wire Deathmatch	13:59
12	Akira Taue, Johnny Ace, and Toshiaki Kawada vs. Kenta Kobashi, Mitsuharu Misawa, and Stan Hansen ended in a time-limit draw	Six-man tag team match	30:00
13	Shinya Hashimoto defeated Masahiro Chono	Singles match	15:56

== See also ==
- Professional wrestling in Japan
- List of professional wrestling promotions in Japan
