= Pride Fighting Championships =

Japanese mixed martial arts promotion

PRIDE Fighting Championships
- Type: Private
- Industry: Mixed martial arts promotion
- Predecessor: Kingdom Professional Wrestling
- Founded: 1997
- Founder: Nobuyuki Sakakibara; Hiromichi Momose; Naoto Morishita
- Defunct: 2007
- Fate: Acquired and deactivated by Zuffa
- Successor: Rizin Fighting Federation
- Headquarters: Tokyo, Japan
- Area served: Japan; United States
- Key people: Nobuyuki Sakakibara; Hiromichi Momose; Naoto Morishita; Nobuhiko Takada
- Parent: Kakutougi Revolutionary Spirits (1997–1999); Dream Stage Entertainment (1999–2007); Zuffa (2007)
- Website: http://www.pridefc.com

PRIDE Fighting Championships (Pride or Pride FC, founded as KRS-Pride) was a Japanese mixed martial arts promotion company. Its inaugural event was held at the Tokyo Dome on October 11, 1997. Pride held more than sixty mixed martial arts events, broadcast to about 40 countries worldwide. PRIDE was owned by the holding company Dream Stage Entertainment (DSE).

For the ten years of its existence, PRIDE was one of the most popular MMA organizations in the world. Pride broadcast its event on Japanese pay-per-view and free-to-air television for millions of spectators in Japan, holding large events in sports stadiums, including the largest live MMA event audience record of 91,107 spectators at the Pride and K-1 co-production, Shockwave/Dynamite, held in August 2002, as well as the audience record of over 67,450 people at the Pride Final Conflict 2003.

Pride was devised in 1997 as a way to promote a fight between Nobuhiko Takada, a professional wrestler at the time considered one of the leading stars of the shoot-style wrestling circuit and the top star of UWF International (UWFi), and Rickson Gracie, a Brazilian Jiu-jitsu fighter from the Gracie family and vale tudo champion. The first event (later known as Pride 1) at the Tokyo Dome drew an audience of 40,000 spectators and attracted the attention of the Japanese media. With the success of the first events, and the Ultimate Fighting Championship (UFC) in crisis at the time, PRIDE became the leading organization in the nascent sport of MMA.

With its origins in Japanese professional wrestling, PRIDE was known for its focus on spectacle and entertainment. Events were proceeded with opening ceremonies and fighters had elaborate entrances. There were no formal weight classes—except for championship belt bouts and the Grand Prix tournaments—and fighters would often be matched with opponents of wildly different weights. Including the frequent promotion of "technique vs size" freakshow fights. Pride's New Year's Eve cards were considered its flagship events, traditionally held at the Saitama Super Arena and featured some of the promotion's biggest fights. Pride also had the Grand Prix, one-night single-elimination tournaments with multiple fighters. The PRIDE ruleset was also more permissive than the Unified Rules of Mixed Martial Arts, permitting soccer kicks, stomps and knees to downed opponents, body slams directly in the head ("spiking"), and allowed more fighting outfits, including wrestling shoes and keikogis. Matches were done in a boxing-style roped ring and went for an opening ten minute round followed by two rounds of five minutes.

In 2006, DSE started to have financial issues, as a scandal revealing ties between the company and yakuza resulted in the end of multiple lucrative contracts with Japanese broadcasters. In March 2007, DSE sold Pride to Lorenzo Fertitta and Frank Fertitta III, co-owners of Zuffa, which, at the time, owned the UFC. While remaining as legally separate entities with separate managements, the two promotions were set to cooperate in a manner akin to the AFL-NFL merger. However, such an arrangement did not materialize, and in October 2007, Pride Worldwide's Japanese staff was laid off, marking the end of the organization as an active fight promoter, while the top and most popular fighters were brought to the UFC. As a result, many of the Pride staff left to form a new organization alongside K-1 parent company Fighting and Entertainment Group. That new organization, founded in February 2008, was named DREAM. However, this promotion would close in 2012 after the bankruptcy of FEG.

In 2015, Pride's co-founder and former president Nobuyuki Sakakibara established Rizin Fighting Federation in Japan with the same philosophy and ambition as for the defunct Pride organization.

== History ==
=== The Origins of Pride ===
Pride has its roots on Japanese Professional wrestling (Puroresu). In the 1970s, Antonio Inoki rose to pronominance in Japan by founding New Japan Pro-Wrestling (NJPW) and introducing his own style of wrestling he dubbed "Strong-style", derived from training in Karate and Catch-As-Catch-Can, an earlier style of legit Professional wrestling and submission grappling, taught by Karl Gotch. This style was more realistic, using full contact strikes and a lot of kicks, as well as realistic grappling moves from his Catch Wrestling training. Inoki promoted professional wrestling as a legit and real combat sport and the "strongest" fighting style, and to prove it he fought worked (i.e. predetermined) matches against fighters from other martial arts and combat sports, such as judo, kickboxing, sumo and karate, known as "heterogeneous combat sports bouts" (Ishu Kakutōgi Sen; 異種格闘技戦). In 1976 Inoki fought a match against boxing world-champion Muhammad Ali, since neither fighter could agree on who would be the loser, the match evolved into a shoot (i.e. real) fight between the two contestants, eventually resulting in a draw.

The match against Muhammad Ali, as well the other heterogeneous style bouts inspired a lot of Inoki's students. They left NJPW and founded a new company named Universal Wrestling Federation (UWF), which promoted a realistic style of pro-wrestling that eschewed the most theatrical elements of wrestling and resembled closer to an actual fight, but it was still predetermined. This style would become known as "Shoot Wrestling". The UWF closed in 1990 and was succeeded in 1991 by the UWFi, which became one of the top professional wrestling promotions in Japan, as their brand of shoot wrestling proved to be exceedingly popular with the Japanese public. The main attraction and most popular star of the UWFi was Nobuhiko Takada. The other precursors of Pride were the Japanese mixed martial arts competitions and shoot style pro wrestling promotions Shooto, a self-styled hybrid martial art organization founded in 1985 by former shoot wrestler "Tiger Mask" Satoru Sayama, Pancrase founded in 1993 by wrestlers Masakatsu Funaki and Minoru Suzuki attempting to create a non-scripted shoot wrestling promotion, Vale Tudo Japan, a Vale Tudo tournament organized in 1994 by Satoru Sayama based on the Ultimate Fighting Championship and Brazilian Vale Tudo and Kingdom, founded in 1997 as a successor to the UWFi. Pride was also influenced by the wild rise of K-1, a kickboxing promotion founded in 1993 which became very popular in Japan for its huge and action-packed tournaments.

=== Early years (1997–1999) ===
Pride Fighting Championships was initially conceived of in 1997, to match popular Japanese pro-wrestler Nobuhiko Takada with Rickson Gracie, the purported champion of the Gracie family of Brazilian jiu-jitsu practitioners, who gained popularity in Japan after winning the 1994 and 1995 Vale Tudo Japan tournaments. The UWFi tried to recruit Gracie in 1994, but the negotiations failed, reportedly as he expressed little interest in working or participating in matches that he regarded as staged rather than legitimate. UWFi wrestler Yoji Anjo answered the purported insult by travelling to Los Angeles with several associates and journalists and did a dojo storm on Gracie's academy. Anjo challenged Gracie to a fight, Gracie accepted and violently defeated him in front of the assembled group, ultimately choking Anjo unconscious after the refused to surrender to Gracie's ground-and-pound. The incident was filmed and subsequently circulated in Japan, where it became a source of considerable embarrassment for the UWFi and enhanced Gracie's reputation as a legitimate fighter. By this point, Takada had become one of Japan's most prominent combat sports figures through the UWFi's shoot-style wrestling, which presented him as a legitimate fighter, making him the promotion's natural candidate to answer Gracie's challenge. Anjo's defeat, however, left the promotion without a satisfactory answer to the humiliation. The UWFi eventually collapsed in December 1996, leaving Takada without a promotion, but the unresolved rivalry between Takada and Gracie provided the foundation for a new event. In the aftermath of the collapse, promoters saw an opportunity to turn the long-standing conflict into a legitimate contest, with Takada positioned as the man who could answer Gracie's challenge and avenge Anjo's defeat. The proposed bout would pit one of Japan's most prominent professional wrestlers against Gracie in a legitimate mixed martial arts fight, rather than a staged professional wrestling match. This concept ultimately led to the creation of the first Pride event.

The event, held at the Tokyo Dome on October 11, 1997, and organised by Hiromichi Momose, Naoto Morishita and Nobuyuki Sakakibara, who had established the Kakutougi Revolutionary Spirits (KRS) promotion, specifically to promote the event. PRIDE.1 attracted 47,000 fans, as well as Japanese mass media attention. Despite the event being conceived largely as a one-off spectacle, the success of the event showed there was a significant audience for large Mixed Martial Arts events. KRS subsequently promoted three more events, including the highly anticipated rematch between Takada and Gracie a year later in 1998. However, KRS was never intended to become the permanent corporate structure behind the promotion. Following its fourth event, the organization was dissolved and its members established Dream Stage Entertainment (DSE), which took over the promotion and its assets. Under DSE, the series' name was formally established as the PRIDE Fighting Championships.

With K-1 enjoying popularity in Japan, Pride began to compete with monthly showings on Fuji Television, as well as pay per view on the newly formed satellite television channel SKY PerfecTV.

=== Pride Grand Prix, Bushido and further rise (2000–2006) ===
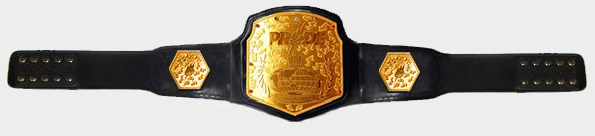
The PRIDE Grand Prix championship belt

In 2000, Pride hosted the first Pride Grand Prix, a two-part openweight tournament held to find the "world's best fighter". The tournament was held over the course of two events, with sixteen fighters competing in an opening round and the eight winners returning three months later for the final round. The second round of the tournament marked the first time Pride was broadcast in the United States and featured a 90-minute match between Kazushi Sakuraba and Royce Gracie and American fighter Mark Coleman winning the tournament by defeating Igor Vovchanchyn in the final round. Pride would gain a fervent cult fanbase in the US, boosted by a highlights deal with Fox Sports Networks and regular DVD releases of Pride shows including older cards that were not initially screened outside of Japan. English-language commentary for Pride was provided by Stephen Quadros or Mauro Ranallo, with Bas Rutten or Frank Trigg providing analysis.

In August 2002, Pride teamed up with Japan's leading kickboxing and fight promotion, K-1, and held the world's biggest fight event, PRIDE Shockwave (known as Pride/K-1 Dynamite!! in Japan), which attracted over 71,000 fans (with some sources claiming 91,107 fans). The event had a big opening ceremony, which featured Antonio Inoki dropping into the stadium by parachute. He then joined Hélio Gracie and the two "founding fathers of MMA" lit a ceremonial olympic torch together. The actual event was marked by a "freak show fight" between 223 lb (101 kg) Antônio Rodrigo Nogueira and 350 lb (158 kg) Bob Sapp, and Hidehiko Yoshida vs. Royce Gracie, a "Judo vs. Jiu-jitsu special rules match" between Yoshida, an Olympic gold medalist in judo and Royce Gracie, the first champion of the UFC. The fight ended in controversy.

On January 13, 2003, the Pride MMA production was thrown into turmoil when DSE president Naoto Morishita was found dead hanging by his neck in his hotel room, apparently after his mistress told him she wanted to end their affair. One of the stories go that Fedor Emelianenko was held at gunpoint to re-sign with Pride Nobuyuki Sakakibara later assumed the presidency, later joined by Takada as a general manager.

In 2003, Pride introduced the Bushido series of events, which focused mainly, but not exclusively, on the lighter weight classes of lightweights and welterweights. The Bushido series also stressed a faster pace, with bouts consisting of only one ten-minute round and one five-minute round, as well as quicker referee intervention of stalling tactics, using the new "yellow card" system of purse deduction.

Also in 2003, Pride returned to the tournament format, with a middleweight grand prix spanning two events, Pride Total Elimination 2003 and Final Conflict 2003. The format was expanded to three events in 2004, adding Critical Countdown 2004 as the second round. Pride would go on to hold annual tournaments, a heavyweight tournament in 2004, a middleweight in 2005, and an openweight in 2006.

Finally, on December 31, 2003, Pride held its first New Year's Eve event, Pride FC: Shockwave 2003 at the Saitama Super Arena. New Year's Eve events subsequently became Pride's largest and most prestigious annual cards, serving as the culmination of the promotion's yearly schedule and featuring many of its biggest stars and most important fights. The tradition reflected the importance of December 31 in Japanese television, where broadcasters competed for large audiences with special programming and major entertainment events. The concept had already been established in combat sports through Antonio Inoki's Inoki Bom-Ba-Ye series: the 2001 edition, produced in cooperation with K-1 and Pride, featured a combination of kickboxing, professional wrestling and mixed martial arts, which demonstrated the potential of a major New Year's Eve fight broadcast. Following the deterioration of relations between DSE and K-1 in 2003, PRIDE began promoting its own New Year's Eve event, while K-1 held K-1 PREMIUM 2003 Dynamite!! and Inoki promoted Inoki Bom-Ba-Ye 2003, resulting in three major competing fight events being held on December 31, 2003.

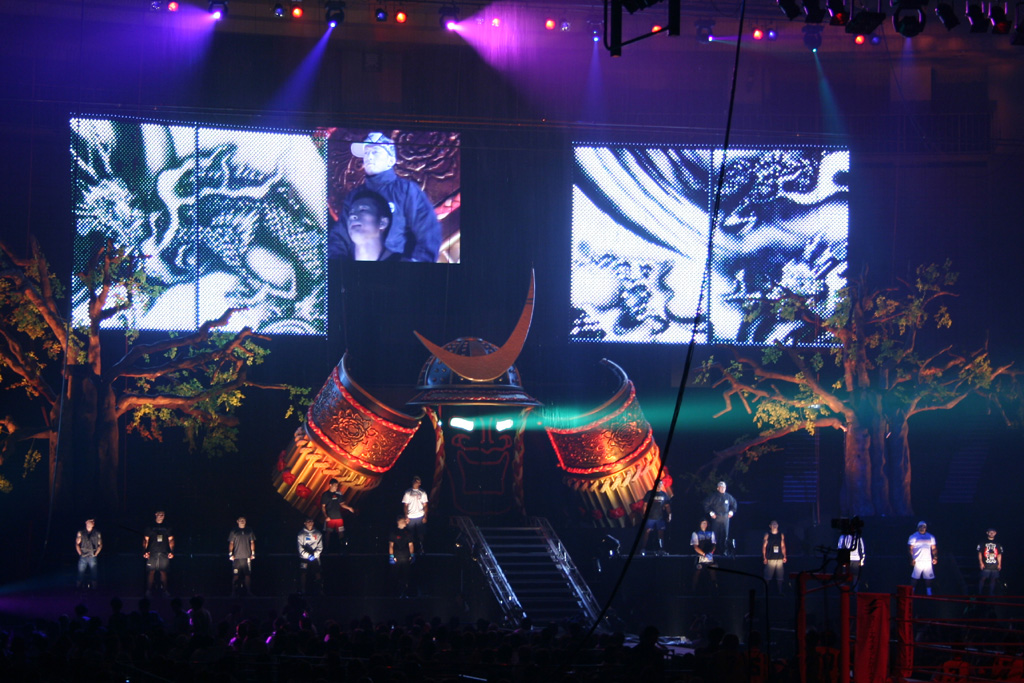
A Pride Fighting Championships fighter introduction in 2005

=== Decline (2006–2007) ===
In 2006, DSE announced it would showcase Pride alongside the Ultimate Fighting Championship, North America's largest MMA event, and would be integrating their fighters, including Wanderlei Silva and Kazuyuki Fujita, at a UFC MMA show in November. However, Dana White, speaking on behalf of Zuffa then commented that the announced bout between Chuck Liddell and Wanderlei Silva was unlikely to happen because "the Japanese are very hard to do business with". This statement was likely due to the failure of previous attempts between Zuffa and DSE to organize a fighter exchange agreement. Specifically after entering Liddell in Pride's 2003 middleweight tournament, which was also with the intention of Liddell eventually fighting Silva, which fell through when Liddell lost in the semi-finals to Quinton Jackson (Jackson subsequently lost to Silva by technical knockout in the finals.)

Pride continued to enjoy success, holding roughly ten events per year, and even out-drawing rival K-1 at the annual New Year's Eve show Pride Shockwave 2005. On October 21, 2006, Pride held its first MMA event in US, Pride 32: The Real Deal took place in front of an audience of 11,727 at the Thomas & Mack Center in Paradise, Nevada, and was the first Pride event to be held outside Japan.

On June 5, 2006, the Fuji Network announced that they were terminating their television contract with Pride Fighting Championships effective immediately due to a breach of contract by DSE. This left Pride with only SKY PerfecTV, a pay-per-view carrier, as a television outlet in Japan, and the loss of the substantial revenues from the Fuji deal threatened its sustainability. Dream was surrounded by speculation in the Japanese media, especially in the Japanese tabloid Shukan Gendai, that it may be a front for the notorious yakuza crime organization. Dream responded to the loss by stating they will continue with their schedule as currently planned, including an event in Las Vegas, Pride 33: Second Coming which took place on February 24, 2007, Pride's second event outside Japan.

In late 2006, DSE hinted at plans for Mike Tyson to fight in the organization's New Year's Eve show. Tyson was to face a Pride fighter under boxing rules. Since Tyson is not allowed to fight in Japan because of his criminal record, Pride wanted to stage the fight in an alternate country, possibly Macau, China. The fight would be broadcast live on large television screens in the Saitama Super Arena, where the regular mixed martial arts bouts were held. The fight did not occur, however.

On November 29, 2006, Pride announced the discontinuation of its Bushido events, with the intention of integrating the matches from lighter weight classes, mainly featured in Bushido, into regular Pride events. Pride also announced that future Grand Prix tournaments would take place on a four-year weight class cycle, with one Grand Prix per year. The first expected one, a lightweight Grand Prix, ended up being cancelled.

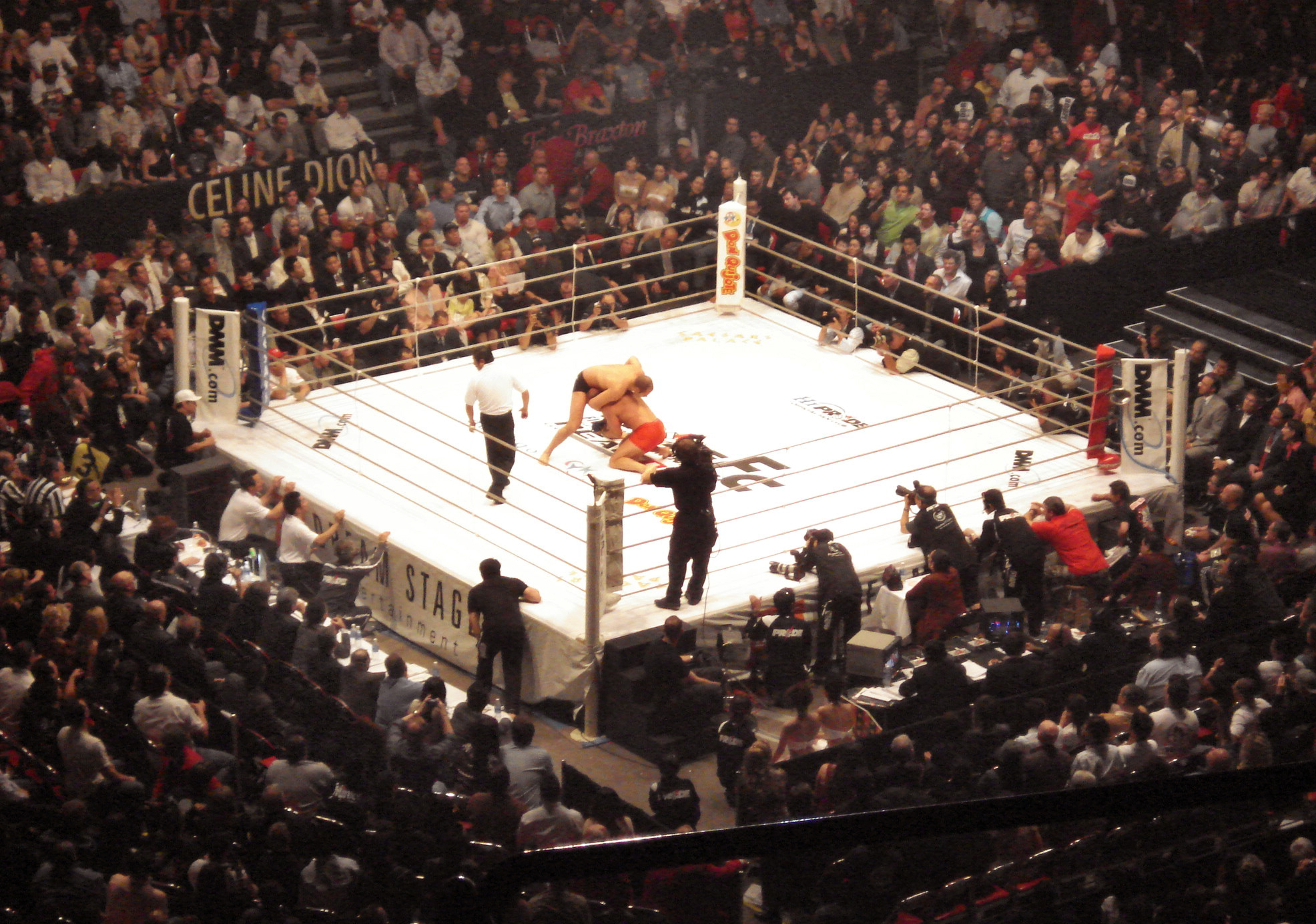
Fedor Emelianenko vs Mark Coleman at Pride 32 in 2006. It was Pride's first international event, taking place in Las Vegas, United States.

=== Acquisition by Zuffa (2007) ===
On Tuesday, March 27, 2007, Pride executives Nobuyuki Sakakibara and Nobuhiko Takada announced that Station Casinos Inc. magnate Lorenzo Fertitta, co-owner of Zuffa and its subsidiary MMA production Ultimate Fighting Championship, had made a deal to acquire all assets of Pride Fighting Championships from Dream Stage Entertainment after Pride 33: The Second Coming in a deal reportedly worth USD$65 million, though the figure was not publicly disclosed. Managing the assets under the newly created Pride FC Worldwide Holdings, LLC, including their video library and the contracts of the fighters currently on the Pride roster, the new management company had originally planned to continue to promote Pride events in Japan and keep to its previously announced schedule. Lorenzo Fertitta announced they planned to operate Pride separately from Zuffa's two MMA brands, the UFC and WEC, planned on having occasional crossover shows and matches, pitting fighters from Pride against fighters "from the UFC," using the metaphor of the AFL-NFL merger to compare the situation.

Subsequent remarks by Zuffa spokesperson Dana White however cast doubt as to what the new owners would actually do with Pride. After the sale officially closed on May 25, 2007, White remarked that he planned on bringing Pride's biggest names into UFC competition instead of keeping them in Pride and that they were still deciding on what to do with Pride itself. In later comments made in August 2007, White expressed doubt that Zuffa can resurrect Pride in Japan, claiming, "I've [or, we] pulled everything out of the trick box that I can and I can't get a TV deal over there with Pride. I don't think they want us there. I don't think they want me there."

On October 4, 2007, Pride Worldwide closed its Japanese office, laying off 20 people who were working there since the closing of DSE.

=== Successors ===
On 31 December 2007, former PRIDE executives, in partnership with Russian promotion M-1 Global and K-1 promoters Fighting and Entertainment Group (FEG) organized Yarennoka!, a New Year's Eve event held at the Saitama Super Arena. The event served as the final installment of PRIDE's traditional New Year's Eve cards and as a farewell to the promotion, bringing together many former PRIDE fighters and staff.

However, the success of the event and subsequent petitions from Japanese MMA fans prompted FEG and former PRIDE staff to combine their efforts to establish a new promotion. In February 2008, many of the former PRIDE staff joined Fighting and Entertainment Group (FEG) to establish DREAM, which became the principal successor to PRIDE's Japanese MMA operations.

A separate successor promotion, World Victory Road, was established in 2007 and launched the Sengoku Raiden Championship (SRC) in 2008. It recruited several former PRIDE fighters, including Takanori Gomi, Kazuo Misaki, Josh Barnett, Hidehiko Yoshida, Kazuyuki Fujita, and Kevin Randleman. In 2011, left without a sponsor, WVR ceased operations.

FEG's financial difficulties eventually led to the company's bankruptcy in May 2012, resulting in the closure of DREAM. In 2015, former PRIDE president Nobuyuki Sakakibara returned to MMA and founded Rizin Fighting Federation, which was positioned as a spiritual successor to both PRIDE and DREAM. Rizin held its inaugural event at the Saitama Super Arena on 29 December 2015, reviving several traditions associated with PRIDE, including its use of a ring, lighter ruleset and annual New Year's Eve events.

== Multimedia ==
=== Video ===
The final Pride events have been released on DVD under the Pride Worldwide label.

Past fights from Pride are shown on Best of Pride Fighting Championships. The program premiered January 15, 2010, on Spike TV. The program's host is Kenda Perez.

=== Video games ===
Pride Fighting Championships released two licensed video games during its time in business, as well as being featured in an Ultimate Fighting Championship game in 2012.

- The first game, Pride FC: Fighting Championships was developed by Anchor Inc. and released by THQ for the PlayStation 2 in February 2003 in Japan and North America and April 2003 in Europe. The game received an aggregate score of 73/100 on Metacritic, based on 19 critic reviews.
- The second game, PrideGP Grand Prix 2003 was developed and released by Capcom also for the PlayStation 2 in November 2003, but was only released in Japan.
- Pride Fighting Championships was also featured in the video game UFC Undisputed 3. Featuring main Pride event rules and 33 Pride fighters (not counting the Pride alumni on the UFC roster to date), the mode also has commentary provided by Bas Rutten and Stephen Quadros, with Lenne Hardt as the English Ring Announcer and Kei Grant as the Japanese Ring Announcer.

== Rules ==
Pride's rules differed between main Pride events and Bushido events. It was announced on November 29, 2006, that Bushido events would be discontinued.

=== Match length ===
Pride matches originally consisted of three rounds; the first lasted ten minutes and the second and third each lasted five minutes. Intermissions between each round were two minutes long. In Pride events held in the United States, the NSAC unified MMA rules were used: non-title matches consisted of three five-minute rounds and title matches consisted of five five-minute rounds, both with 60-second intermissions.

When two rounds of a Grand Prix took place on the same night, bouts consisted of two rounds, the first lasting ten minutes and the second lasting five. Intermissions between each round remained two minutes long.

=== Weight classes ===
Pride Fighting Championships did not divide their fighters based on weight divisions per se. A fighter could be booked to fight an opponent of any weight. Weight divisions were used for championship bouts and for Grands Prix to decide a best fighter at a given weight class.

Weight class name	Weight limit	Since
Lightweight	73 kg (161 lb)	2004
Welterweight	83 kg (183 lb)	2004
Middleweight	93 kg (205 lb)	2000
Heavyweight	Unlimited	2000
Openweight	No weight restrictions	1997

=== Ring ===
Pride used a five-roped square ring with sides 7 m in length (approximately 23 ft). The same was used at Pride: Bushido events.

=== Attire ===
Pride allowed fighters latitude in their choice of attire, but open finger gloves, a mouthguard and a protective cup were mandatory. Fighters were allowed to use tape on parts of their body or to wear a gi top, gi pants, wrestling shoes, kneepads, elbow pads, or ankle supports, and masks at their own discretion, though each was checked by the referee before the fight.

=== Victory ===
Matches could be won via:

- Submission
  - A fighter taps either his opponent or the mat three times
  - A fighter verbally submits
- Technical submission
  - A fighter goes unconscious from a choke
  - An arm, or any other body part, is broken by the submission
- Knockout
  - A fighter falls from a legal blow and is either unconscious or unable to immediately continue
- Technical knockout
  - Referee stoppage (the referee stops the match after seeing that one fighter is completely dominant to the point of endangering his opponent)
  - Doctor stoppage (the referee stops the match in the event that a fighter is injured via a legal blow and the ring doctor determines that he cannot continue)
  - Forfeited match (a fighter's corner throws in the towel)
- Decision
  - If the match reaches its time limit then the outcome of the bout is determined by the three judges. The fight is scored in its entirety and not round-by-round. (In Pride events staged in the United States, however, the fights were scored round by round.) After the third round, each judge must decide a winner. Matches cannot end in a draw. A decision is made according to the following criteria in this order of priority:

1. The effort made to finish the fight via KO or submission
2. Damage given to the opponent
3. Standing combinations and ground control
4. Takedowns and takedown defense
5. Aggressiveness
6. Weight (in the case that the weight difference is 10 kg/22 lb or more)

If a fight was stopped on advice of the ring doctor after an accidental but illegal action, e.g. a clash of heads, and the contest is in its second or third round, the match was decided by the judges using the same criteria.

- Disqualification
  - A "warning" was given in the form of a yellow card or a green card (The green card gave a 10% deduction of a fighter's purse) when a fighter committed an illegal action or did not follow the referee's instruction. Three warnings resulted in a disqualification
  - A fighter was disqualified if a match was stopped, on the advice of the ring doctor, as a result of his deliberate illegal actions.
  - The application of oil, ointment, spray, Vaseline, massaging cream, hair cream, or any other substances to any part of the fighter's body before and during the fights was prohibited. The discovery of any of these substances resulted in a disqualification.
- No contest
  - In the event that both sides committed a violation of the rules, the bout would be declared a "no contest".
  - If a fight was stopped on the advice of the ring doctor after an accidental but illegal action, i.e. a clash of heads, the match would be declared a no contest in the first round only

=== Fouls ===
Pride Fighting Championships considered the following to be fouls:

- Head butting
- Eye gouging
- Hair pulling
- Biting
- Fish hooking
- Any attacks to the groin
- Purposely striking the back of the head (if a punch was thrown and the fighter turned away letting it land on the back of his head it was okay), which included the occipital region and the spine. The sides of the head and the area around the ears were not considered to be the back of the head (rabbit punch).
- Small joint manipulation (control of four or more fingers or toes was necessary).
- Elbow strikes to the head and face.
- Intentionally throwing the opponent out of the ring.
- Running out of the ring.
- Purposely holding the ropes. Fighters were not permitted to purposely hang an arm or leg on the ropes and it would result in an immediate warning.
- Stomps to a grounded fighter along with kicks and knees to the head of a grounded fighter (only for events held in the US).

In the event that a fighter was injured by illegal actions, then at the discretion of the referee and ring doctor, the round would attempt to be resumed after enough time had been given to the fighter to recover. Once the fight started again the fighters would be placed in the exact position when the referee called the time out. If the match could not be continued due to the severity of the injury then the fighter who perpetrated the action was disqualified.

=== Match conduct ===
- If both fighters were on the verge of falling out of the ring or became entangled in the ropes, the referee would stop the action. The fighters were required to immediately stop their movements and then would be repositioned in the center of the ring in the same relative position. Once they were comfortably repositioned, they would resume at the referee's instruction.
- Referees could give a fighter a penalty card for lack of activity. Every card, including warning cards, were a 10% deduction of a fighter's purse, this method was aimed to prevent inaction.

=== Matches between fighters of different weight classes ===
Pride made special provisions for fights between fighters of different weight classes or fighters with a large weight difference in the same weight class. The lighter fighter was given a choice of whether or not to permit knees or kicks to the face when in the "four points" position in the following cases:

- If both fighters were in the middleweight class and there was a weight difference of 10 kg/22 lb or more between the fighters.
- If the match was between a middleweight and heavyweight and there was a weight difference of 10 kg/22 lb or more between the fighters.
- If both fighters were in the heavyweight class and there was a weight difference of 15 kg/33 lb or more between the fighters.

=== Pride Bushido ===
PRIDE BUSHIDO were a series of PRIDE events with a special ruleset. The word BUSHIDO translates from the Japanese language as "the way of the warrior". More specifically, the term refers to the principals and moral code that developed among the samurai (military) class of Japan. BUSHIDO provided flexibility for more experimental fight card formats, such as "team" competitions pitting country versus country, or fight team versus fight team. BUSHIDO also gave an opportunity to up and coming fighters to prove themselves through matches with a special ruleset, known as "Challenge Matches." There were a few minor differences from main Pride events:

- Bouts on Pride Bushido events consisted of two rounds; the first lasting ten minutes and the second lasting five. Intermissions between each round were two minutes in length.
- Bushido "Challenge Matches" consisted of two rounds lasting five minutes each. Intermissions between each round were two minutes in length.
- In Bushido, red cards were issued in a similar way that yellow cards were used in Pride FC. A red card resulted in a 10% deduction of the fighter's fight purse. Red cards could be given out in an unlimited number without disqualification. If fighters committed the following actions, they were to be given a red card by officials:
  - stalling or failure to initiate any offensive attack
  - making no attempt to finalize the match or damage the opponent
  - holding the opponent's body with the arms and legs to produce a stalemate

=== Differences from the Unified Rules of Mixed Martial Arts ===
Some states' athletic commissions require mixed martial arts events to modify rules to match the Mixed Martial Arts Unified Rules of Combat, as introduced by the New Jersey State Athletic Control Board, and adopted by the Nevada State Athletic Commission in order to receive state sanctioning.

Pride's rules differed from the Unified Rules of Combat in the following ways:

- Pride allowed kicking and kneeing the head of a downed opponent. This is considered a foul in the unified rules, which only allows kicks and knees to the head of a standing opponent.
- Pride allowed a fighter to stomp the head of a downed opponent. This is considered a foul in the unified rules.
- Pride allowed a fighter to spike (piledrive) an opponent onto the canvas on his head or neck. This is considered a foul in the unified rules.
- Pride did not allow elbow strikes to the head of an opponent. The unified rules allow elbows provided they are not striking directly down with the point of the elbow (12 o'clock to 6 o'clock).
- Pride's matches included a ten-minute first round, with two-minute rest periods. The unified rules allow rounds no longer than five minutes, with rest periods not exceeding one minute.
- Pride's matches were not judged on the ten-point must system, rather judges scored the whole fight. The unified rules call for all matches to be judged using the ten-point must system.

At the announcement on March 27, 2007, that the Fertittas were purchasing Pride, it was stated that all future Pride events (after Pride 34) would be held under unified rules, eliminating 10-minute opening rounds, ground knees, stomps and more, though there were no more Pride events held to use these rules.

== Pride events ==
Events typically begin with the theme music entitled PRIDE, composed by Yasuharu Takanashi, with each fight ending with the music entitled Victory, also composed by Takanashi. In addition to their main, "numbered" events, Pride have staged other series of events for different purposes.

=== Pride Grand Prix ===
The Pride GP (Grand Prix) is the name of a series of tournaments held by Pride. In addition to a money prize, a championship belt was given to the winner of each tournament, though this belt only denoted the tournament winner and would never be defended. However, Pride's Shockwave 2005 event crowned not only the welterweight and lightweight tournament champions, but also Pride's inaugural welterweight and lightweight champions. Of note is the amount of past and future champions that would participate in these tournaments.

In 2000, Pride held their first Grand Prix. With no weight limits, it is now considered to be their first openweight grand prix. Held across two events, Pride Grand Prix 2000 Opening Round featured first round bouts and Pride Grand Prix 2000 Finals featured the quarter-finals, semi finals and final.

The concept was brought back in 2003, with a middleweight grand prix. Held across two cards, Pride Total Elimination 2003 featured the first round of the Grand Prix and Final Conflict 2003 featured the semi-finals and final. Subsequent middleweight, heavyweight and openweight grands prix had taken place across three events when, in 2004, Critical Countdown was introduced for second round bouts. Both Critical Countdown and Final Conflict had a mix of Grand Prix and non-Grand Prix matches.

In 2007, it was announced that Pride would hold only one Grand Prix a year and it would rotate between each of their four established weight classes.

==== Format ====
Except for the inaugural 2000 Grand Prix, tournament dates with only one round would adhere to normal Pride or Pride Bushido rules. For tournament dates that held two rounds, a fight had a 10-minute first round, followed by a two-minute rest period for the fighters, and then a five-minute last round.

===== Exceptions =====
The 2000 Finals held a 90-minute contest between Kazushi Sakuraba and Royce Gracie. Gracie had requested that there be no judging and no limit to the number of rounds. Sakuraba agreed to fight under these rules, and the contest went to a total of 90 minutes of fighting, after which Gracie's corner threw in the towel due to damage to Gracie's legs. Sakuraba advanced to the next round, fighting a fifteen-minute first round against eventual runner up Igor Vovchanchyn, after which Sakuraba's corner threw in the towel citing his exhaustion.

==== List of events ====
Year	Weight class	Events	Winner
2000	Openweight	Opening round, finals	(United States) Mark Coleman
2003	Middleweight	Pride Total Elimination 2003, Final Conflict	(Brazil) Wanderlei Silva
2004	Heavyweight	Total Elimination, Critical Countdown, Final Conflict	(Russia) Fedor Emelianenko
2005	Middleweight	Total Elimination, Critical Countdown, Final Conflict	(Brazil) Mauricio Rua
2005	Welterweight	Bushido 9, Shockwave	(United States) Dan Henderson
2005	Lightweight	Bushido 9, Shockwave	(Japan) Takanori Gomi
2006	Openweight	Total Elimination, Critical Countdown, Final Conflict	(Croatia) Mirko Filipović

=== Pride Bushido ===
With Pride's numbered shows and Grands Prix focused on heavier fighters, in October 2003, Pride started a series of events entitled "Bushido". With the focus on lighter combatants, two weight classes, lightweight and welterweight, were formed at 73 and 83 kg respectively. After Pride Bushido 13, it was announced that the series would end and these weight classes would transfer to main Pride shows.

In 2005, Pride Bushido staged welterweight and lightweight Grands Prix. Two eight-man brackets were set up and the quarter-finals and semi finals were held at Pride Bushido 9, along with an alternate bout in each bracket. The finals were held at Pride Shockwave 2005, with the winners subsequently being crowned as champions for their division. A sixteen-man welterweight grand prix was held in 2006.

=== Pride The Best ===
In 2002, Pride launched The Best, a series of shows featuring up-and-coming fighters, using an eight-sided roped ring. However, after the third show in October 2002, the series was discontinued. The concept was later refined into the Pride Bushido events.

== Final champions ==
When Zuffa LLC bought Pride, it moved to unify the Pride middleweight and welterweight titles with its own light-heavyweight (205 lbs) and middleweight (185 lbs) titles. Dan Henderson, who held both the Pride middleweight and welterweight belts at the time of the Zuffa buy-out, was beaten in two unification bouts, first to Quinton 'Rampage' Jackson in September 2007 and then to middleweight Anderson Silva in March 2008.

The titleholders below were those who held the titles on April 8, 2007, the date of the last Pride FC promoted show.

=== Weight divisions ===
Division	Weight limit	Champion	Since	Title defenses
Heavyweight	Unlimited	(Russia) Fedor Emelianenko	March 16, 2003	3
Middleweight	93 kg (205 lb)	(United States) Dan Henderson	February 24, 2007	0
Welterweight	83 kg (183 lb)	(United States) Dan Henderson	December 31, 2005	0
Lightweight	73 kg (161 lb)	(Japan) Takanori Gomi	December 31, 2005	1

=== Tournaments ===
An asterisk (*) indicates that the tournament was also a title fight.

Year/weight division	Champion	Runner up	Event
2000 Openweight	(United States) Mark Coleman	(Ukraine) Igor Vovchanchyn	Pride Grand Prix 2000 Finals
2003 Middleweight	(Brazil) Wanderlei Silva	(United States) Quinton Jackson	Pride Final Conflict 2003
2004 Heavyweight	(Russia) Fedor Emelianenko	(Brazil) Antônio Rodrigo Nogueira	Pride Shockwave 2004*
2005 Middleweight	(Brazil) Mauricio Rua	(Brazil) Ricardo Arona	Pride Final Conflict 2005
2005 Welterweight	(United States) Dan Henderson	(Brazil) Murilo Bustamante	Pride Shockwave 2005*
2005 Lightweight	(Japan) Takanori Gomi	(Japan) Hayato Sakurai	Pride Shockwave 2005*
2006 Openweight	(Croatia) Mirko Filipović	(United States) Josh Barnett	Pride Final Conflict Absolute
2006 Welterweight	(Japan) Kazuo Misaki	(Canada) Denis Kang	Pride Bushido 13

== Notable fighters ==
The following fighters have won a tournament or championship titles or were high contenders in Pride. Some have competed in different weight classes.

=== Heavyweight ===
- (Russia) Fedor Emelianenko (last Pride FC Heavyweight Champion, Pride FC 2004 Heavyweight Grand Prix Champion, undefeated in Pride)
- (Brazil) Antônio Rodrigo Nogueira (first Pride FC Heavyweight Champion, Pride FC Heavyweight Interim Champion, Pride FC 2004 Heavyweight Grand Prix runner-up, former UFC Interim Heavyweight Champion)
- (Croatia) Mirko Filipović (Pride FC 2006 Openweight Grand Prix Champion, Pride FC 2005 Heavyweight title challenger, K-1 World Grand Prix 2012 Champion, former IGF Heavyweight Champion, Rizin FF 2016 Openweight Grand Prix Champion)
- (United States) Mark Coleman (Pride FC 2000 Openweight Grand Prix Champion, former UFC Heavyweight Champion)
- (United States) Josh Barnett (Pride FC 2006 Openweight Grand Prix runner-up, former UFC Heavyweight Champion)
- (Ukraine) Igor Vovchanchyn (Pride FC 2000 Openweight Grand Prix runner-up)
- (United States) Ken Shamrock (Pride FC 2000 Superfight winner, former UFC Superfight Champion)
- (New Zealand) Mark Hunt (Pride FC 2006 Heavyweight Title challenger, K-1 World Grand Prix 2001 Champion)
- (Russia) Sergei Kharitonov (Pride FC 2004 Heavyweight Grand Prix semi-finalist)
- (Japan) Kazuyuki Fujita (Pride FC 2000 Openweight Grand Prix Semi-finalist)
- (United States) Mark Kerr (Pride FC 2000 Openweight Grand Prix quarter-finalist, two-time UFC Heavyweight Tournament Champion, WVC Championship tournament winner)
- (Netherlands) Semmy Schilt (four-time K-1 World Grand Prix Champion, former K-1 Super Heavyweight Champion, current Glory Heavyweight Champion, Glory Heavyweight Grand Slam 2012 Champion)
- (United States) Don Frye (UFC 8 and Ultimate Ultimate 1996 Tournament Champion)
- (United States) Kevin Randleman (former UFC Heavyweight Champion)
- (Brazil) Fabrício Werdum (Former UFC Heavyweight Champion)

=== Middleweight ===
- (Brazil) Wanderlei Silva (first Pride FC Middleweight Champion and Pride FC 2003 Middleweight Grand Prix Champion, most wins, title defenses, fights, and knockouts in Pride history)
- (Brazil) Mauricio "Shogun" Rua (Pride FC 2005 Middleweight Grand Prix Champion and former UFC Light Heavyweight Champion)
- (Brazil) Anderson Silva (Unified the Pride World Welterweight Champion and UFC Middleweight champion, and former Shooto 修斗 Middleweight Champion)
- (United States) Quinton "Rampage" Jackson (Pride FC 2003 Middleweight Grand Prix runner-up, Pride FC 2004 Middleweight Title challenger, and former UFC Light Heavyweight Champion)
- Kazushi Sakuraba (Pride FC 2000 Openweight Grand Prix semi-finalist, Pride FC 2001 Middleweight Title challenger, and UFC Japan Heavyweight Tournament Champion)
- (Brazil) Ricardo Arona (Pride FC 2005 Middleweight Grand Prix runner-up)
- (Japan) Kiyoshi Tamura (Pride FC 2002 Middleweight Title challenger)
- (United States) Chuck Liddell (2003 Pride FC Middleweight Grand Prix semi-finalist and former UFC Light Heavyweight Champion)
- (Netherlands) Alistair Overeem (Pride FC 2005 Middleweight Grand Prix semi-finalist, former Dream and Strikeforce heavyweight champion, 2010 K-1 World Grand Prix Champion)
- (Japan) Hiromitsu Kanehara (Pride FC 2002 Middleweight Title challenger)
- (Japan) Hidehiko Yoshida (1992 Summer Olympics 78 kg Judo gold medalist and Pride FC 2003 Middleweight Grand Prix semi-finalist)
- (Brazil) Vitor Belfort (2005 Pride FC Middleweight Grand Prix participant and former UFC Light Heavyweight Champion)
- (Brazil) Royce Gracie (2000 Pride FC Openweight Grand Prix Quarterfinal, UFC One, Two and Four champion)
- (Japan) Kazuhiro Nakamura (2005 Pride FC Middleweight Grand Prix quarter-finalist)
- (Brazil) Murilo Rua (Pride FC participant, former Elite XC Middleweight Champion)

=== Welterweight ===
- (United States) Dan Henderson (Pride FC 2005 Welterweight Grand Prix Champion, last Pride FC Welterweight Champion and Middleweight Champion, last Strikeforce Light Heavyweight Champion)
- (Canada) Carlos Newton (former UFC Welterweight Champion)
- (Japan) Kazuo Misaki (Pride FC 2006 Welterweight Grand Prix Champion)
- (Brazil) Murilo Bustamante (Pride FC 2005 Welterweight Grand Prix runner-up and former UFC Middleweight Champion)
- (Canada) Denis Kang (Pride FC 2006 Welterweight Grand Prix runner-up)
- (Brazil) Paulo Filho (former WEC Middleweight Champion and Pride FC 2006 Welterweight Grand Prix finalist: replaced due to injury by Kazuo Misaki)
- (Japan) Ikuhisa Minowa (Pride FC 2005 Welterweight Grand Prix semi-finalist)
- (Japan) Akihiro Gono (Pride FC 2005 and 2006 Welterweight Grand Prix semi-finalist)
- (Netherlands) Gegard Mousasi (Bellator middleweight champion, former Strikeforce Light Heavyweight Champion, former Dream Light Heavyweight and Middleweight Champion, 2010 DREAM Light Heavyweight Grand Prix Champion and 2008 Dream Middleweight Grand Prix Champion)
- (Cuba) Hector Lombard (former Bellator Middleweight Champion)

=== Lightweight ===
- (Japan) Takanori Gomi (only Pride FC Lightweight Champion and Pride FC 2005 Lightweight Grand Prix Champion)
- (Japan) Hayato Sakurai (Pride FC 2005 Lightweight Grand Prix runner-up and former Shooto Middleweight Champion)
- (Brazil) Marcus Aurélio (Pride FC 2006 Lightweight Title challenger)
- (Norway) Joachim Hansen (Pride FC 2005 Lightweight Grand Prix semi-finalist, former Shooto Welterweight Champion and former Dream Lightweight Champion)
- (Brazil) Luiz Azeredo (Pride FC 2005 Lightweight Grand Prix semi-finalist)
- (Japan) Shinya Aoki (former One Fighting Championship Lightweight Champion, former Dream Lightweight Champion and former Shooto Welterweight Champion)
- (United States) Jens Pulver (former UFC Lightweight Champion)
- (Japan) Tatsuya Kawajiri (former Shooto Welterweight Champion)
- (United States) Gilbert Melendez (former Strikeforce Lightweight Champion and Former WEC Lightweight Champion)
- (Japan) Daisuke Nakamura (former Deep Lightweight Champion)
- (United States) Nick Diaz (former Strikeforce Welterweight Champion)

== See also ==
- List of Pride events
- List of Pride champions
- List of Pride FC fighters
- List of Pride Fighting Championships records
- List of male mixed martial artists
- Yarennoka
