= Dream Stage Entertainment =

Mixed martial arts promoter based in Japan

- Abbreviation: DSE
- Location: Japan

Dream Stage Entertainment (DSE) was a Japanese company that promoted various wrestling and mixed martial arts events, most notably mixed martial arts Pride Fighting Championship and Hustle professional wrestling events.

== Company history ==
=== Allegations of links to organized crime ===
There was speculation in the Japanese press that DSE was a front for Yamaguchi-gumi, a notorious yakuza organization. On June 5, 2006, Fuji Television announced that they were terminating their television contract with DSE effective immediately due to a breach of contract. This left Pride and Hustle without a television outlet in Japan, and the lack of the substantial revenues from the deal threatens its sustainability. Furthermore, Fuji banned anyone connected with DSE on their programs.

On June 12, 2006, SKY PerfecTV!, Japan's leading satellite broadcasting company, announced that they would continue to carry DSE programming, such as Pride and Hustle. Hustle, and the second round of the Pride Open Weight Grand Prix, both scheduled for the Saitama Super Arena, would be broadcast live to millions of homes across Japan. SKY PerfectTV! executives mentioned the decision to carry DSE events was not final and any future problems regarding the alleged connection between DSE and Japanese mafia, as reported by Shukan Gendai, might be reason enough to discontinue the relationship.

=== DSE's impacts in the US ===
On October 21, 2006, Pride held its first MMA event in USA, Pride 32: The Real Deal' took place at the Thomas & Mack Center in Las Vegas. It was the first Pride event to be held outside Japan, and in front of an audience of 11,727.

=== Dissolution ===
A buyout of the company by Zuffa, the operators of UFC, had been rumored since late 2006, but on 26 March 2007, Dana White and Lorenzo Fertitta held a press conference in Japan alongside Pride F.C. Executive Nobuyuki Sakakibara, announcing the complete buyout of Pride F.C. and all of its assets by Zuffa (sources close have indicated the buyout to be slightly under US$70 million). While little official information has been released following the buy-out, it is presumed that DSE will fold and PRIDE F.C. will be operated by the newly created parent company, PRIDE F.C. Worldwide.

In 2008, various executives and on-screen personnel from Dream Stage Entertainment joined FEG latest MMA endeavor, DREAM replaced FEG's previous mixed martial arts fight series, HERO'S. The series retained many of the stylistic flourishes and personnel from Pride FC broadcasts, including fight announcer Lenne Hardt and veteran referee Yuji Shimada.

== Head officials ==
- Nobuyuki Sakakibara - President and CEO
- Nobuhiko Takada - General director and president of Hustle
- Sotaro Shinoda - Vice president
- Shigeru Saeki - Public relations director and deep promoter

== See also ==
- Dream (mixed martial arts)
- Pride Fighting Championship
