= Muhammad Ali vs. Antonio Inoki =

Fight between American boxer and Japanese wrestler

The War of the Worlds
- Date: June 26, 1976
- Venue: Nippon Budokan, Tokyo, Japan

Tale of the tape
Boxer	Muhammad Ali	Antonio Inoki
Nickname	The Greatest	Moeru Toukon ("Burning Fighting Spirit")
Hometown	Louisville, Kentucky, U.S.	Yokohama, Japan
Purse	$6,100,000	$2,000,000
Pre-fight record	52–2 (Professional boxing)	0–0 (Professional boxing)
Age	34 years, 5 months	33 years, 4 months
Height	6 ft 3 in (191 cm)	6 ft 3 in (191 cm)
Weight	218 lb (99 kg)	220 lb (100 kg)
Style	Western boxing	Catch wrestling, karate
Recognition	WBC, WBA, The Ring and Lineal Heavyweight Champion; Undisputed World Heavyweight Champion	NWF Heavyweight Champion

Result
- 15-round draw

Muhammad Ali vs. Antonio Inoki, billed as The War of the Worlds, was a fight between American professional boxer Muhammad Ali and Japanese professional wrestler Antonio Inoki, held at the Nippon Budokan arena in Tokyo, Japan, on June 26, 1976. At the time, Ali had come off a knockout victory over Richard Dunn in May and was the undisputed heavyweight boxing champion. Inoki, who had been taught catch wrestling by wrestler Karl Gotch, was staging exhibition fights against champions of various martial arts, in an attempt to show that pro wrestling was the dominant fighting discipline.

The fight itself, which was fought under special rules, is seen as a precursor to modern mixed martial arts (MMA). The majority of the fight saw Inoki on his back kicking Ali's legs 107 times uninhibited by the referee (due to a particular rule negotiated shortly before the fight, which allowed him to do so without being disqualified). The result of the fight, a draw, has long been debated by the press and fans. The fight was refereed by Gene LeBell.

== Background ==
In April 1975, at a reception held in the United States, Muhammad Ali was introduced to Ichiro Hatta, president of the Japanese Amateur Wrestling Association. Ali characteristically bragged to Hatta: "Isn't there any Oriental fighter who will challenge me? I'll give him one million dollars if he wins". This flippant remark made headlines in Japan, and Ali's challenge was accepted by Inoki, whose financial backers offered the boxer $6 million for the fight. The deal was struck in March 1976, and the fight was scheduled for June 26 at Tokyo's Nippon Budokan.

Several press conferences were held to promote the fight. When the two men first met, Ali announced he would nickname Inoki "The Pelican", because of his prominent chin. Inoki replied, via an interpreter: "When your fist connects with my chin, take care that your fist is not damaged". He then presented Ali with a crutch, to use after he had been thrown from the ring. Inoki said afterwards: "I don't know how seriously Muhammad Ali is taking the fight, but if he doesn't take it seriously, he could suffer damage. I'm going in there fighting. I may even break his arm".

In preparation for the fight, Ali trained with a wrestler, The Sheik. Ali also sparred with wrestlers Kenny Jay and Buddy Wolff, defeating both in televised exhibition matches.

The Associated Press prefaced a report by its correspondent John Roderick written on the eve of the fight by describing it as "...what is called by some the world's first Martial Arts Championship — and by others a multi-million-dollar sham".

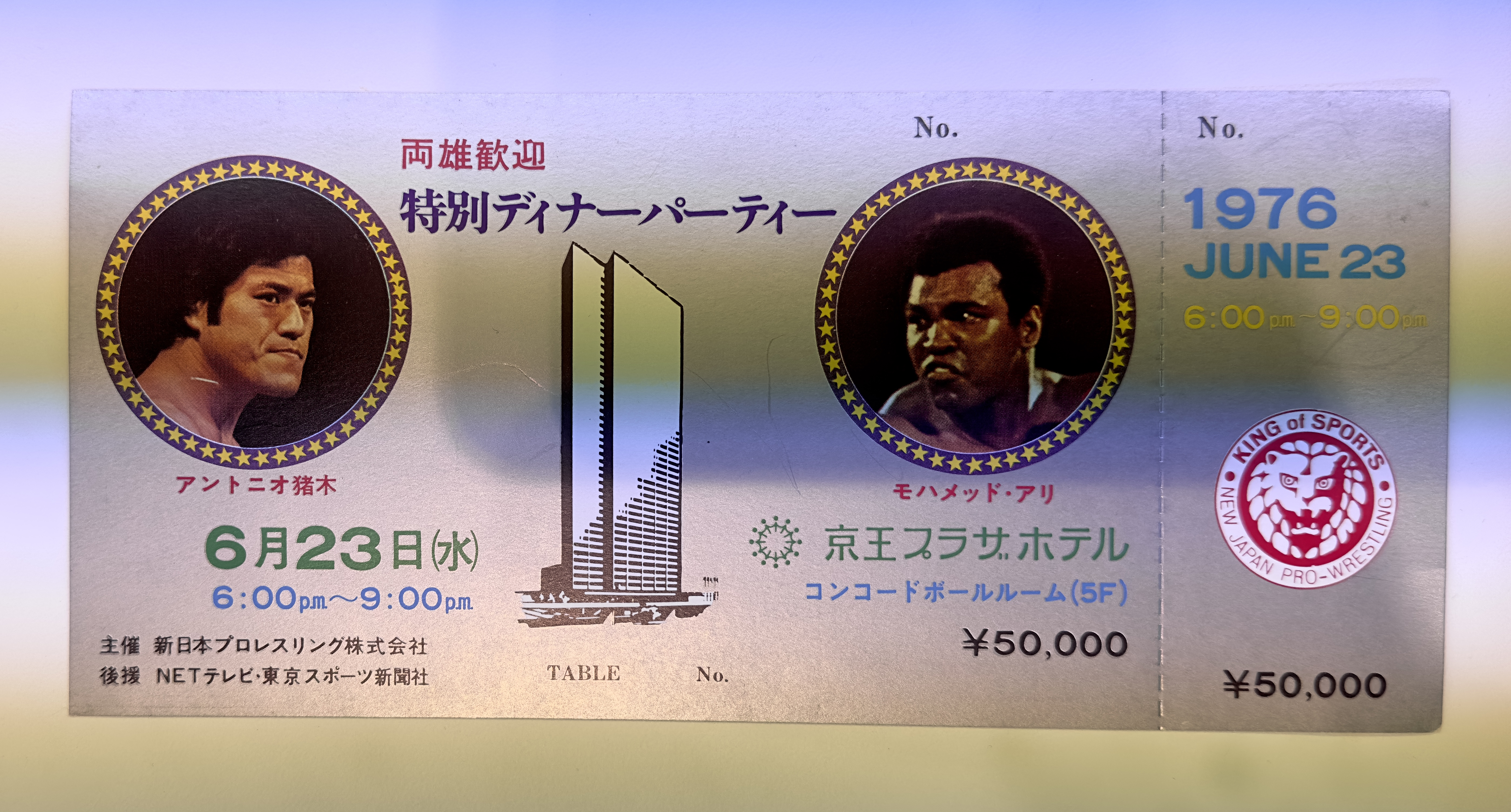
¥50,000 ticket for the special welcome dinner party held three days before Muhammad Ali vs. Antonio Inoki match.

On the day of the fight Ali made a scene upon his arrival at the airport, bellowing "There will be no Pearl Harbor! Muhammad Ali has returned! There will be no Pearl Harbor!" as he walked past the mass of journalists. Anticipation for the fight was huge; it would be broadcast to 34 countries around the world to an estimated audience of 1.4 billion. Because of time zone differences, the bout was seen on June 25 at over 150 closed circuit TV locations in the US. In New York, pro-wrestling promoter Vince McMahon, Sr. sold tickets to a closed-circuit telecast of the fight at Shea Stadium, and drew a crowd of 32,897. At Showdown at Shea, the Ali and Inoki fight would be the main event on a card that also featured wrestler André the Giant vs. boxer Chuck Wepner. The Budokan itself was sold out, with the most expensive seats costing ¥300,000 (equivalent to about US$1,000 at the time and US$5,700 currently).

Martial arts expert Donn F. Draeger was skeptical of the match, believing it would be a choreographed professional wrestling bout given that in his opinion, any competent wrestler had the advantage over a boxer in a real fight. He shared to Robert W. Smith that he believed himself capable of submitting Ali in the ring by using judo. According to him, fellow high level jūdōka Isao Inokuma and Kisaburo Watanabe also believed they could submit Ali in under one minute.

== Rules ==
The fight was contested under specially created rules. Due to varying claims over the years, it is difficult to know the reasons behind their implementation. Inoki initially responded to Ali's 'challenge' to having a bare-knuckle match in a letter to Angelo Dundee and promoter Don King in early June, 1975.

On March 25, 1976, Ali and Inoki held a press conference at the Plaza Hotel in New York City. It included a signing ceremony to officially declare a match between the world heavyweight boxing champion and the Japanese wrestling star, the latter also a world champion of the National Wrestling Federation. Both parties agreed to a KO or submission in order to recognize the victor, with Ali wearing boxing gloves and Inoki fighting barehanded. These terms were negotiated and agreed upon by Angelo Dundee, Vince McMahon Sr., and Mike LeBell, Gene's brother and promoter.

It has been alleged that Ali's handlers originally agreed to a worked match, but that Ali never agreed to fix the fight. According to boxing journalist Jim Murphy, the original plan was for Ali to accidentally punch the referee and knock him out. While standing over the referee, looking concerned, Inoki would knock him out with an enzuigiri or a roundhouse kick to the head. The referee would then come around and count Ali out, giving Inoki the win in front of his fellow countrymen, and allowing Ali to save face. However, when Ali found out he had to lose, he refused, turning the fixed fight into a real one.

According to Inoki, Ali and his entourage had signed on expecting the fight to be an exhibition rather than a real contest. It was only when they went to see Inoki train six days before the fight, and saw him use a series of brutal kicks and grapples on sparring partners, that they sensed it would be a legitimate fight. Inoki alleges he was asked by Ali, "OK, so when do we do the rehearsal?", with Inoki replying: "No, no. This isn't an exhibition. It's a real fight!"

In the days leading up to the fight, Ali and Inoki's representatives began to renegotiate the rules. A list of restrictions was imposed on Inoki. He would not be allowed to throw, grapple or tackle Ali and could not land any kicks unless he had one knee on the mat. Ali's camp also demanded that the rules not be made public before the fight. The rule stipulations were made public by New Japan Pro-Wrestling on May 25, 1976, and an amended version reflecting Ali's additional demands on June 23. Draeger noted, "The rules have been so seriously modified that the contest is no longer boxing versus wrestling. Unless this were done there would be no way to choreograph the match and make it look convincing. Ali can grapple or punch the man down; Inoki is not allowed to leg-dive or tackle. That latter restriction is the same as prohibiting Ali from jabbing. What a farce!"

On June 23, 1976, frustrated by repeated rule changes clearly designed to limit what he could do against Ali, Inoki proposed a winner-take-all of personal assets and the entire promotional revenue as proof of how serious he was about the match during the final signing ceremony three days before the battle; Ali accepted and signed the contract. However, on the next day, Ali's people demanded the contract to be voided, explaining that Ali could not singlehandedly agree to any match without consulting his manager and promoter.

Professional wrestler Bret Hart, who started touring Japan in 1980, claimed in his 2008 autobiography that "the black Muslims who were backing Ali made it clear that if Inoki laid a finger on their champ, they would kill him. That's why Inoki lay on his back for fifteen rounds, kicking Ali in the shins so as not to use his hands". This claim was lent credibility by then NJPW referee Mr. Takahashi, who assured it was Ali's entourage and not Ali himself who demanded the restriction. In 2016, the referee Gene LeBell further denied that there were actual limitations on kicking or grappling and said all types of kicking, throwing and grappling were allowed.

At a public weigh-in the day before the match, Ali came in at slightly above 99 kg (218.3 lbs.) and Inoki tipped the scales at around 100.5 kg (221.6 lbs.)

== Fight summary ==
=== Entrances ===
Inoki made his entrance first, wearing his signature purple robe and being accompanied by former professional and Olympic amateur wrestler Karl Gotch, Olympic judo medalist Seiji Sakaguchi, wrestling trainer Kotetsu Yamamoto, and star wrestler (and former boxer) Kantaro Hoshino. Ali was the second entrance, sporting a red and white robe and being followed by his manager Herbert Muhammad, his trainers Angelo Dundee and Wali Muhammad, his cornerman Drew Bundini Brown, and Dr. Ferdie Pacheco. For this occasion, his entourage had been reinforced with professional wrestler Freddie Blassie, taekwondo master Jhoon Goo Rhee (considered the "Father of American Taekwondo"), and promoter Butch Lewis. He donned specially made four-ounce Everlast gloves, unusually smaller than those typically used in heavyweight boxing matches, loaded with tape and gauze.

=== Rounds 1–5 ===
As soon as the opening bell rang, Inoki ran the 16 ft (4.9 m) distance between Ali and himself and slid at the legs of Ali, who sidestepped the attack. Inoki stayed on the ground and started kicking and sweeping for Ali's legs. After scoring a hard kick to the right leg, Inoki stood up momentarily, but returned to his field and continued throwing kicks, landing a side kick which forced Ali's corner to instruct him to back away from Inoki. Ali taunted Inoki to stand up, but the wrestler answered by continuing his kicking strategy, connecting with a few of them until the end of the round.

The second and third rounds unfolded the same way, with Inoki taking refuge from possible punches on the mat and kicking the legs of an infuriated Ali. The boxer, who taunted the wrestler unceasingly, maneuvered to avoid several of the kicks, but Inoki crab crawled across the mat towards him and kept connecting kicks to the legs. By the third round, a wound had appeared on Ali's left knee, and the crowd had started to boo at the lack of solid action. After harshly arguing with his corner, Ali began walking around the ring, out of reach of Inoki's kicks, taunting him by shouting "Coward Inoki! Inoki no fight!" and "One punch! I want one punch!"

In the fourth round, Inoki missed a jumping side kick but, still on his back, crawled towards Ali, trapping him in a corner. While LeBell restarted action in the center of the ring, Ali mockingly pushed the referee with his chest, earning an admonition. Inoki returned to his strategy, prompting Ali to scream "I thought Inoki could wrestle!" and "Inoki girl!" multiple times. The Japanese eventually trapped him again in a corner and started kicking wildly at his thighs, prompting Ali to leap up on to the ropes and tuck his legs underneath him in an attempt to avoid the strikes. A new restart by LeBell came near of the end of the round.

The fifth round followed closely the already familiar pattern of the match, with Inoki landing kicks from his back and Ali looking for ways to counter it. The round did feature, however, an instance in which Inoki knocked Ali off his feet with one of his kicks. Upon recovering and dancing around to avoid more hits, the boxer managed to grab Inoki's boot and drag him a short distance, but the bell sounded before anything could follow up. Ali's legs were already bruised and bleeding due to the accumulated kicks, the sight of which finally drew some appreciation from the crowd after the round ended.

=== Rounds 6–10 ===
In round six, Inoki repeated his usual jumping side kick into lying on the canvas. One of the subsequent kicks landed toe-first on Ali's groin, gaining a warning from LeBell for an illegal groin attack, but he followed up with two more successful legal kicks. Ali got hold of Inoki's boots with the goal of immobilizing him for a punch, but Inoki, wiser in grappling, countered by grabbing Ali's left shoe, wrapping his right leg around Ali's right calf and sweeping down to the mat. Inoki sat on Ali and turned towards his legs, pursuing a leglock, but Ali managed to swing one of his feet over the ring rope, which called for a standing restart. Knowing his chance had waned, Inoki still threw a back elbow strike to Ali's face while action was being stopped, gaining a warning and a point deducted by LeBell due to the boxer's protests. As the bout resumed, Ali tried to kick Inoki while illegally holding the ropes for balance, attracting his own reprimand.

In the seventh round, it was Inoki who goaded Ali to meet him on the ground, but Ali refused and threw a pair of kicks that missed. Ali finally threw his first punch, a long jab to Inoki's face, only for Inoki to knock him down with a sweeping kick. Although the crowd chanted for Ali, he seemed wary of trying to strike again, allowing for another landed kick for the wrestler. After the round ended, the bloody state of Ali's left leg worried Dr. Pacheco, who rubbed it with ice and ointment. Meanwhile, Dundee went over to the Japanese corner and talked to Gotch, claiming that one of Inoki's brass eyelets had come loose from his boot and was cutting Ali's legs. He demanded that they tape the tips of his shoelaces, and so they did.

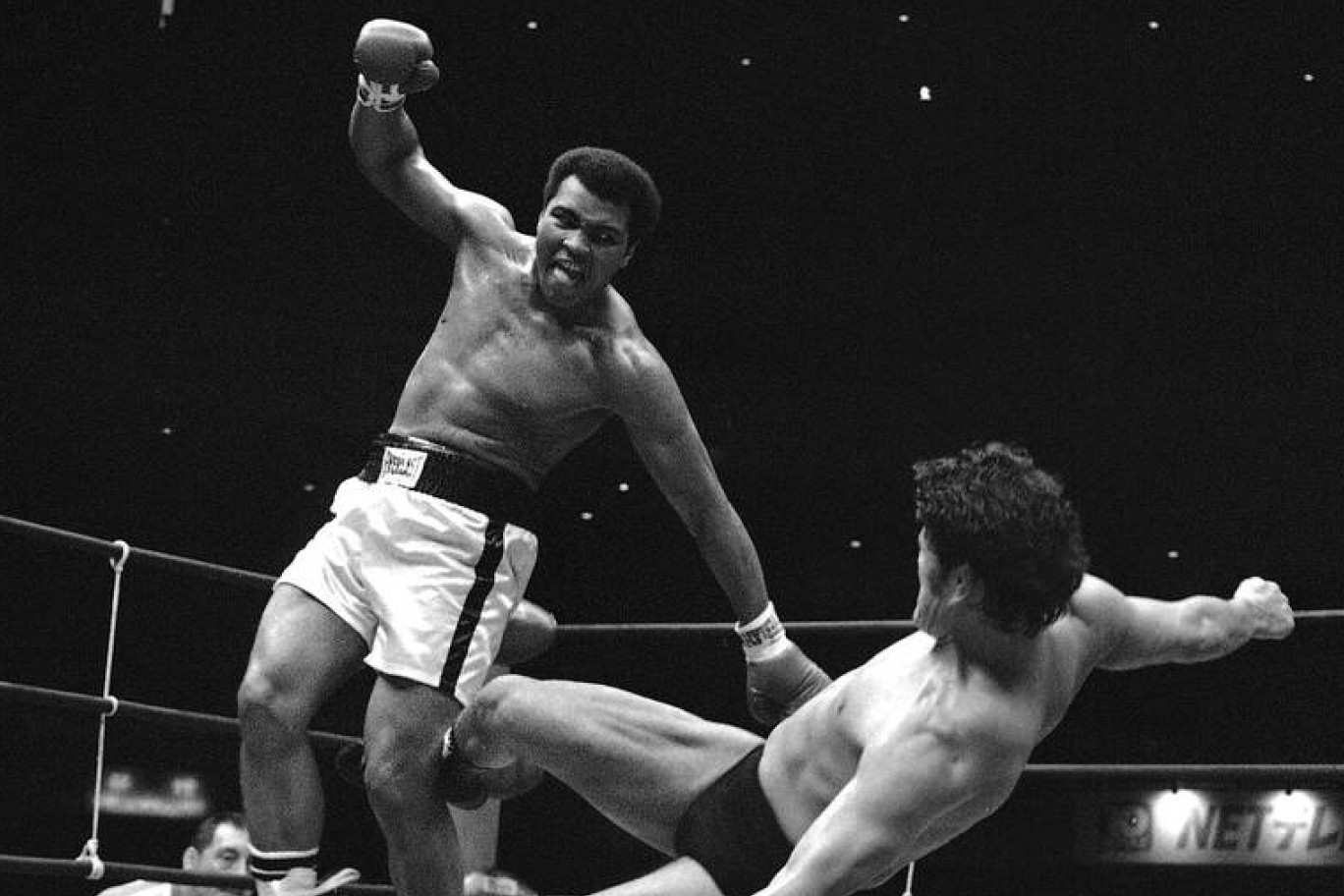
Inoki kicking Ali in the 8th round

The match's pattern did not change in round eight, where Ali had predicted he would finish Inoki. The Japanese wrestler connected a pair of kicks that dropped Ali again, although LeBell mistakenly warned him for a low blow. He was also forced to stop the match several times to reapply tape onto the tip of Inoki's right boot. Inoki showed irritation by these repeated halts by LeBell. The uneventful round then ended with Ali still taunting Inoki and shouting "Inoki nothing!" The mistaken low blow was owing to LeBell's not having a clear view, yet it cost Inoki a point deduction.

In the ninth, Ali passed to attack. He crouched down and sought for jabs while dancing, drawing chants from the crowd. He also attempted to circle the supine Inoki around, trying to get Inoki to return to his feet to avoid being outmaneuvered, and thus forcefully entering hitting range. However, Inoki adhered to his own strategy and landed a kick that sent Ali staggering to his corner. Inoki connected another, and by this point Ali's repeated tumbling made evident to the crowd the damage to his legs.

In the tenth, Ali threw his second punch, landing a jab in Inoki's face, but the execution of the move left his leg open to another kick. Although Inoki followed up with an inside leg kick and an outside one to the same leg, the crowd chanted for him to fight standing, so he charged at Ali, who clamped to the ring ropes. The rest of the round went without new events, so the crowd was now solidly against Inoki, despite Ali engaging in increasingly worried talks with his team.

=== Rounds 11–15 ===
The eleventh round saw Ali trying a new tactic. As suggested by his cornerman Rhee, a taekwondo expert, Ali would try to block Inoki's kicks with his gloves and arms in order to protect his leg. This allowed Ali to catch and twist Inoki's foot, although he lacked the grappling knowledge to turn it into a submission move. The boxer's blocks were relatively successful, but Inoki had continued to land kicks, and Ali's corner was forced to tend his leg again. In Inoki's own corner, Gotch advised Inoki to either tackle Ali down or capitalize on the next time Ali fell down, so he could pin him and finish him by submission.

In round twelve, Ali became confident after blocking several, though not all, of Inoki's kicks. Inoki then got up and landed a clean low kick, but this drew protests, as rules impeded him from kicking standing. Ali's corner told him to capitalize and attack Inoki, but the latter immediately returned to safe ground, impeding further action. When the round ended, Ali's left leg was so swollen that, according to reviewers, it "appeared to be double the size of the right."

In the thirteenth round, Ali again became the aggressor, taking the center of the ring and backing Inoki towards a corner. The wrestler then feigned a takedown attempt to push Ali towards the ropes, as he could not execute a true technique due to the ruleset. Afterwards, Ali taunted him by blocking with his glove, but Inoki did not kick as expected, as he charged at Ali again. The wrestler grabbed a waist lock, threatening with a suplex, but Ali hurriedly grabbed the rope. During the subsequent clinch, Ali put his weight on Inoki, to which the latter answered with an illegal knee strike to the groin. Among the protests, LeBell asked Ali if he could continue, and it seemed the boxer was going to exit the ring, but the referee convinced him to return. Restarting the bout, Inoki threw a tentative low kick, but Ali responded by firing and connecting two jabs, forcing him to go to the canvas as usual. After the round ended, Inoki was deducted another point due to the new groin strike.

In the fourteenth round, Inoki feigned some bare-fisted jabs and a takedown before dropping low for another of his kicks. Ali clamped to the ropes without provocation, drawing protests by Inoki. The contenders exchanged taunts, goading each other to meet in their respective field of expertise. Ali then landed a stiff left jab at the very end of the round.

Before the fifteenth and final round, Inoki and Ali shook hands while the crowd acclaimed in anticipation of a possible climactic finish. However, Inoki's strategy went unchanged, even though Ali openly reminded him of the bout's approaching end. Inoki landed several kicks more before Ali landed a counter jab, but nothing came from it, and when the final bell sounded, both men shook hands again and embraced among a mix of cheers and jeers.

After Ali gave a speech about how he thought himself as the winner due to Inoki's "cowardice", the judges gathered to decide the result. Veteran professional wrestler Kokichi Endo scored it 74–72 for Ali, while boxing judge Ko Toyama scored it 72–68 for Inoki, thus leaving the weight of the decision to referee LeBell. Taking into consideration the points deducted from Inoki, he scored it 71–71 and thereby a draw. According to modern estimations by FightMetric, Ali landed nine significant strikes during the fight, while Inoki landed 78.

== Aftermath ==
The result meant no one had to lose face; Inoki could claim he would have won had it not been for the penalties, whereas Ali could defend himself by saying his opponent had cheated. However, the fight was poorly received. The crowd at the Budokan threw rubbish into the ring and chanted "Money back! Money back!" Donn Draeger said of the response: "The Budokan janitorial people took almost a full day to clean up the garbage that was hurled at the two 'combatants' as the result of their lousy performance". Ali's left leg was so badly swollen and bleeding that it led to an infection. He also suffered two blood clots in his legs affecting his mobility for the remainder of his boxing career. At one point amputation was also discussed, although Ali insisted to the press that it was nothing serious.

Riots and boos happened not only in the Budokan, but also among the crowds of broadcasts of the event, as they were unaware of the restrictions put on Inoki. Dave Meltzer explained it as "they were expecting something like a cross between a boxing match and a pro wrestling match and got nothing resembling either." According to Inoki's attendant Yoshiaki Fujiwara, the situation drove Inoki to tears when he was left alone with him in the dressing room. Only after the fight could Inoki explain himself to a world critical of his tactics during the fight. "I was handicapped by the rules that said no tackling, no karate chops, no punching on the mat. I kept my distance to stay away [from] Ali's punches."

== Viewership and revenue ==
The 14,500-seat Nippon Budokan arena was sold out. Ticket prices started from ¥5,000 for the nosebleed section (equivalent to about US$17 at the time and US$95 currently), while ringside seats for the public cost ¥300,000 (equivalent to about US$1,000 at the time and US$5,700 currently) and "royal ringside" seats for sponsors cost US$3,000 (equivalent to about US$17,000 currently).

The fight was watched by an estimated 1.4 billion viewers worldwide, including more than 54 million viewers in Japan. In the United States, the fight sold at least 2 million or more pay-per-view buys on closed-circuit theater TV. At a ticket price of US$10 (equivalent to about US$57 currently), the fight grossed at least US$20 million (equivalent to about US$113 million currently) or more from closed-circuit theater TV revenue in the United States.

== Legacy ==
The fight is considered by boxing writers and fans as one of the most embarrassing moments in the careers of both Ali and his cornermen. Rhee considered the match and their participation as "shameful", and Pacheco would even deny to have taken part in the event until forty years later. Referee LeBell was the only person who remembered the match in a positive light, calling it a "very interesting, and a great memory. [...] It was a 'thinking' fight. It was two champions in their arts."

Despite the challenge, Ali and Inoki became good friends following the fight. Inoki started using Ali's theme music, "Ali Bombaye (Zaire Chant) I" (taken from Ali's 1977 biographical film), as his own signature tune, and borrowed the catchphrase "boma ye" from Ali's fans at the Rumble in the Jungle. Ali would continue to box for the next five years. In 1978, he lost the WBA and WBC heavyweight championships to Leon Spinks, but regained the WBA title (the WBC had stripped Spinks of his title due to his refusal to fight Ken Norton, the Number 1 contender) in a rematch the same year. In 1986, Spinks would also fight and lose to Inoki in the eighth round of a match for the WWF World Martial Arts Heavyweight Championship. After a two-year retirement, Ali would lose to Larry Holmes in 1980, and following a unanimous-decision loss to Trevor Berbick in 1981, retired from boxing.

Inoki continued to wrestle for the next 22 years. In 1989, Inoki established his own political group, the Sports and Peace Party. He was elected to the House of Councillors of the Diet of Japan. In 1990, he went to negotiate with Saddam Hussein over the release of Japanese citizens being held hostage in Iraq. Ali took part in Inoki's controversial two-day pro wrestling event in Pyongyang, North Korea, titled the Pyongyang International Sports and Culture Festival for Peace, where Inoki wrestled Ric Flair in the main event. Inoki eventually left office in 1995 amid accusations he had been bribed by the Yakuza. In 2012, Inoki revealed that he had converted to Shia Islam in 1990 and adopted the Islamic name "Muhammad Hussain Inoki".

The fight played a role in the history of mixed martial arts, particularly in Japan. The match inspired Inoki's students Masakatsu Funaki and Minoru Suzuki to found Pancrase in 1993, which in turn inspired the foundation of Pride Fighting Championships in 1997. Pride was later acquired by its rival Ultimate Fighting Championship in 2007.

In 1998, 38 years after his wrestling debut, Inoki retired. Ali flew out from the United States to watch Inoki win his final match against Don "The Predator" Frye. After the match, Ali climbed into the ring and hugged Inoki. Ali's representative read a message over the PA:

It was 1976 when I fought Antonio Inoki at the Budokan. In the ring, we were tough opponents. After that, we built love and friendship with mutual respect. So, I feel a little less lonely now that Antonio has retired. It is my honour to be standing on the ring with my good friend after 22 years. Our future is bright and has a clear vision. Antonio Inoki and I put our best efforts into making world peace through sports, to prove there is only one mankind beyond the sexual, ethnical [sic] or cultural differences. It is my pleasure to come here today."

== See also ==
- Masahiko Kimura vs. Hélio Gracie
- Kazushi Sakuraba vs. Royce Gracie
- Trevor Berbick

== Bibliography ==
- Gross, Josh (June 21, 2016). Ali vs. Inoki: The Forgotten Fight That Inspired Mixed Martial Arts and Launched Sports Entertainment. BenBella Books. ISBN 978-1-942-95219-0.
- Takeuchi, Kōsuke (July 1996). The Truth of the Inoki vs. Ali Match: Examining after 20 Years. Nippon Sports Publishing.
