= Hidehiko Yoshida vs. Royce Gracie =

Mixed martial arts matches

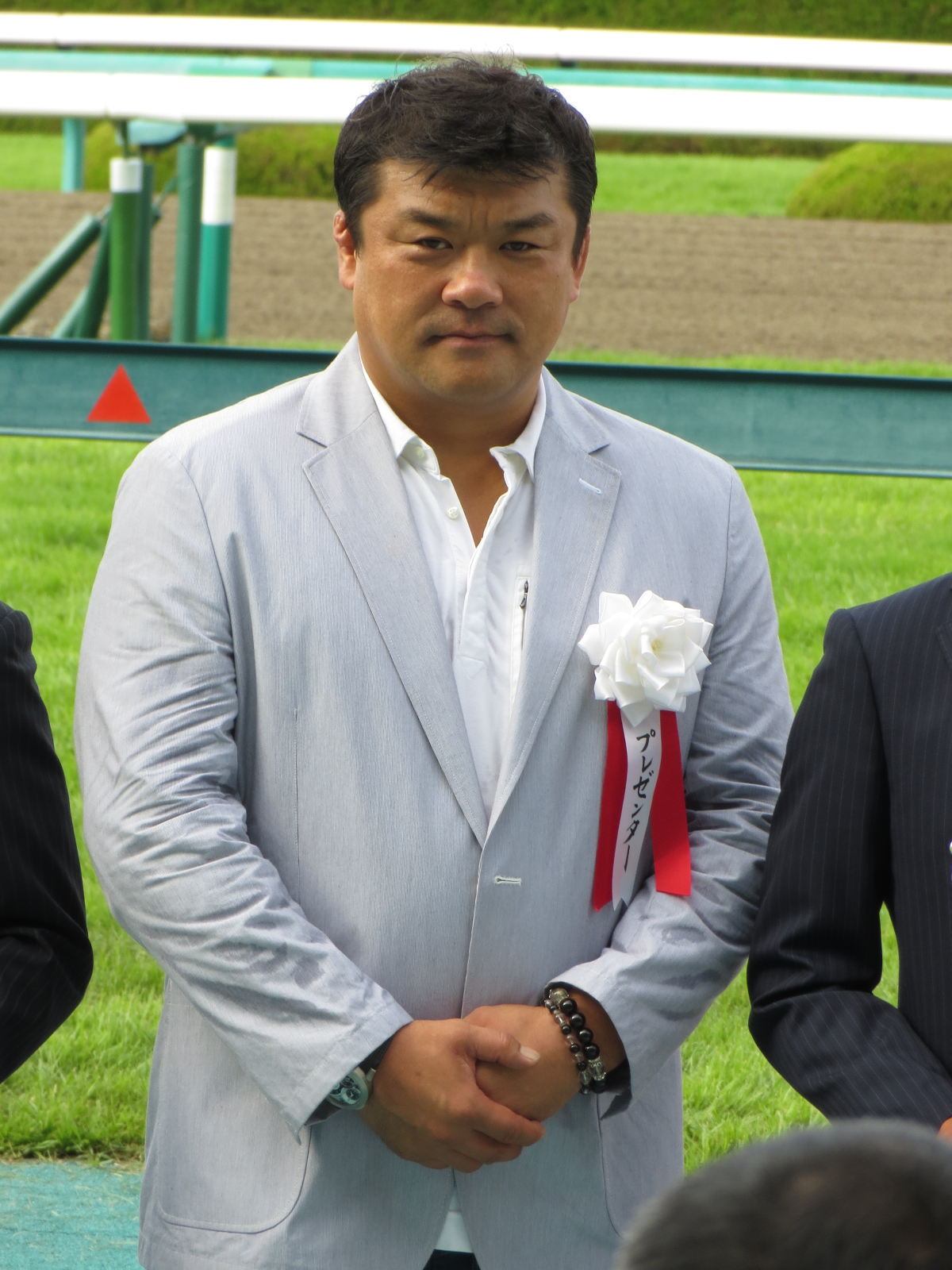
Hidehiko Yoshida in 2013.

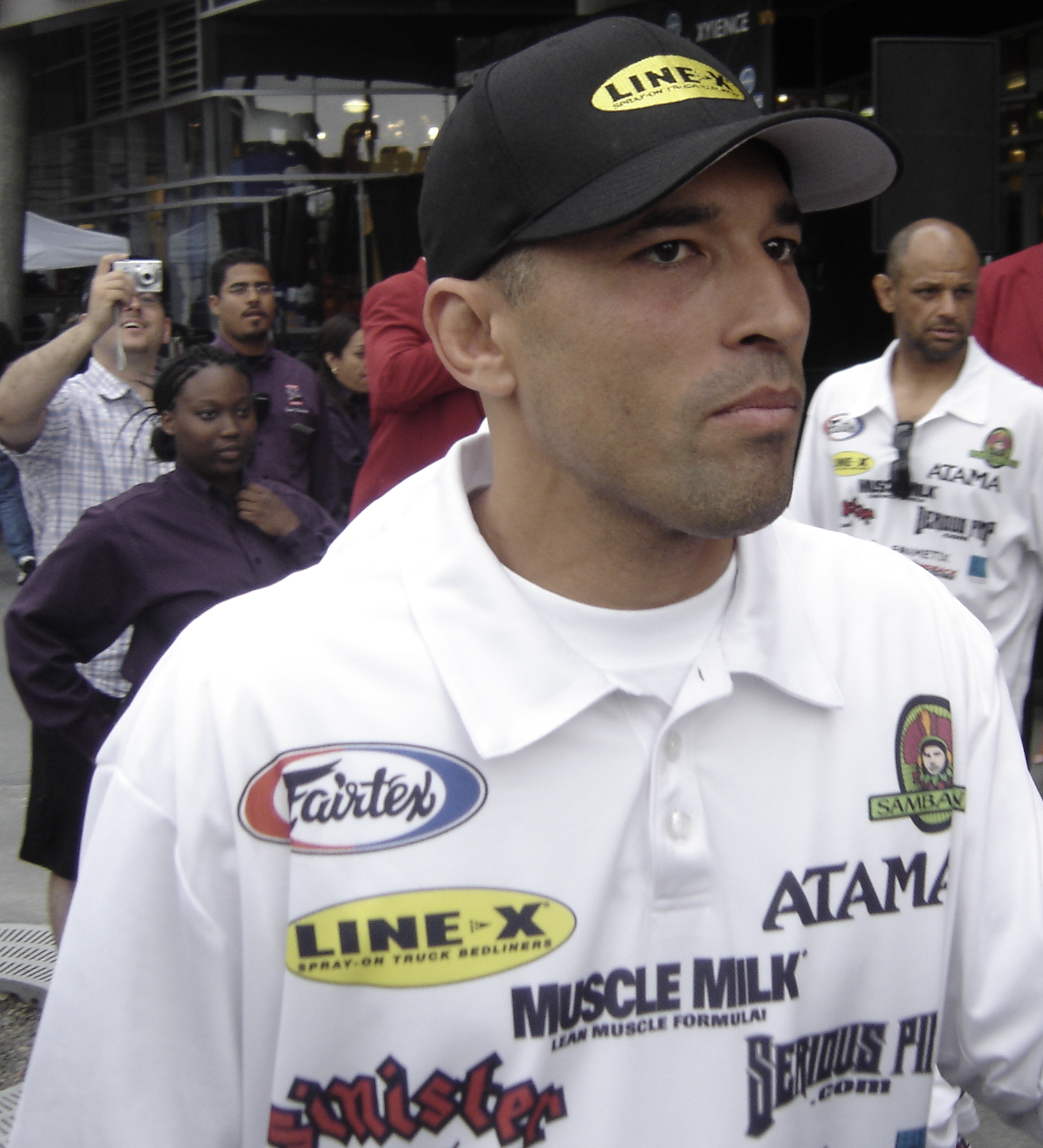
Royce Gracie in 2007.

Two fights between Hidehiko Yoshida and Royce Gracie were held in 2002 and 2003 at mixed martial arts organization PRIDE Fighting Championships. The first bout was disputed under special rules, and ended with Yoshida being declared the winner by the controversial application of a choke. A rematch under full MMA rules happened a year later, ending in a draw due to the absence of judges demanded by Gracie. The whole affair attracted notoriety and controversy in the mixed martial arts world due to those and other factors.

== Background ==
When Yoshida signed up with Pride in 2002 to start a career in MMA, promoters worked for him to have his debut against Ultimate Fighting Championship pioneer Royce Gracie, son of the renowned Hélio Gracie. However, having just celebrated the 50th anniversary of the 1951 Masahiko Kimura vs. Hélio Gracie fight, Royce suggested the match to be hosted under similar rules as a homage, turning it into an unofficial "judo vs. Brazilian jiu-jitsu" challenge. He had the blessings of Hélio himself, though he dismissed billing it as a revenge bout, preferring to think of it as a personal challenge. Similarly, Yoshida described it as just a chance to showcase his particular judo skills, also considering that he "could not be mentioned in the same breath as Kimura-sensei."

In order to recreate faithfully the Kimura vs. Gracie bout, special "jacket match" rules were created to be used instead of the regular MMA format. The fight would be contested in two 10-minute rounds and would be declared a draw if no result was achieved. Strikes to the head were disallowed, as was any kind of strike if both opponents were on the ground. Lying on the mat or dropping down without touching the opponent would be banned as well. Both fighters would wear a keikogi as per their respective disciplines's preference. The fight would take place at the Pride Shockwave event on August 28, 2002, co-produced between Pride and K-1.

Despite the personal approach of the contenders, the match attracted a great deal of anticipation due to the clash of their fighting styles. Yoshida described himself as unskilled in groundfighting, as he had built his judo career mainly on his throwing abilities, so he made sure to hone his grappling with his long time friend Tsuyoshi "TK" Kohsaka, a judoka and mixed martial artist. However, Yoshida also noted that judo and Brazilian jiu-jitsu were not so different, and even if he was wary of unfamiliar jiu-jitsu techniques, he was ultimately confident that his judo background would serve him well. For their part, the Gracie side were sure of their victory, trusting the superiority of their style of jiu-jitsu over any eventuality, including Yoshida's 18 kg weight advantage. Hélio summed it by stating, "me and my son didn't come all this way from Brazil to lose. Royce will win for sure."

Other fighters were also outspoken about it. Mário Sperry from Brazilian Top Team agreed with the Gracie side, noting that, "unlike the days when Kimura was touring Brazil, when Japanese judokas were very strong on the ground, judo players since the 1964 Olympics have lost their feel for the floor. Royce will not have a problem with Yoshida on the ground."

== Fight ==
- Date: August 28, 2002
- Venue: National Stadium, Tokyo, Japan
- Title(s) on the line: N/A

Tale of the tape
Boxer	(Japan) Hidehiko Yoshida	(Brazil) Royce Gracie
Nickname	"The Golden Judo King"	"The Ultimate Fighter”
Hometown	Obu, Aichi, Japan	Torrance, California, United States
Pre-fight record	0–0	0–0
Height	5 ft 11 in (1.80 m)	6 ft 0 in (1.83 m)
Weight	225 lb (102 kg)	176 lb (80 kg)
Style	Judo	Brazilian jiu-jitsu
Recognition	1992 Summer Olympics judo gold medalist 1999 World Judo Championships gold medalist	UFC 1 Tournament winner UFC 2 Tournament winner UFC 4 Tournament winner

Result
- Yoshida won by technical submission in the first round

Gracie made his entrance first on the Tokyo National Stadium. He was accompanied by Hélio and the rest of the Gracie Academy, including their relatives Royler, Renzo, Rodrigo, Carlos Jr. and Rolker, performing their characteristic "Gracie train" formation. Yoshida entered afterwards, cornered by Kohsaka and his Alliance-Squared team. The referee would be Pride official Daisuke Noguchi.

Started the match, after some circling, Gracie advanced with a front kick feint and gripped up with Yoshida. Although the judoka overrode him, Gracie pulled guard to avoid his standing game, frustrating Yoshida's intentions to enter groundwork through a throw. Yoshida remained standing, still gripped to the supine Royce, and avoided an armbar attempt from the bottom. After struggling at their positions for some minutes, Gracie reached for an ankle lock, to which the Japanese fell back and attempted a heel hook. Showing signs of pain, Gracie tried to counter with another ankle lock, which looked fruitful, but as the hold exchange became stagnant, Noguchi stood the contenders back.

After the pause, Gracie gripped up and pulled guard again. The now crouched Yoshida grabbed Gracie, lifted him up and slammed him in the way of daki age, but Gracie resisted and worked new leglock and armlock attempts. However, the judoka capitalized on this to pass his guard and achieve half mount, eventually fully mounting him. From there, Yoshida reached down for Royce's neck and locked a sode guruma jime, which was followed by a moment of inactivity.

Feeling Gracie had lost his strength, but unable to see clearly his face from his own position, Yoshida asked Noguchi verbally whether Gracie had lost consciousness. The referee judged so, helped by the visual impression that Gracie's arm had become limp, and called for the fight to be stopped, giving the win to Yoshida by technical submission. While the judoka celebrated with his team, Gracie returned to his feet and protested vigorously, claiming he had not been rendered unconscious. Gracie chased Noguchi, throwing punches at the ring crew when he was restrained, and grabbed Yoshida's jacket to demand him to tell the judges. The crowd, who had been cheering moments before, booed heavily at Royce's behavior. Yoshida took the microphone to explain Gracie's claims to the audience, humorously speculating about a rematch.

Later into the show, the Gracie team issued an apology for the brawl. Nevertheless, after the main event, Hélio and Royce jumped into the ring and issued a complaint on the mic, again among heavy booing. They stated that only Hélio could stop the match by throwing the towel if Royce didn't surrender, and demanded their loss to be turned into no contest. K-1 executive Kazuyoshi Ishii joined them and asked for two weeks for the judges to gather and revise the result.

== Reception ==
The Pride Shockwave event was a critical and economic success, and the bout between Yoshida and Gracie in particular attracted a 28.7 rating, becoming the match with the biggest rating in the history of Pride up to that point. However, its result attracted a comparable controversy, dividing media among those who believed Yoshida's victory was justified and those who purported Gracie had suffered a fraudulent loss.

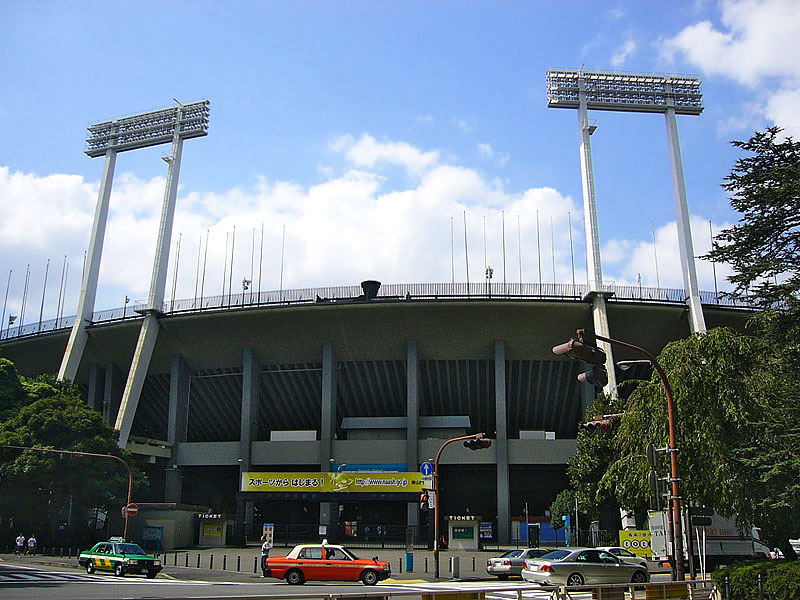
The Tokyo National Stadium, where the Shockwave event was celebrated.

As the Gracie side had demanded, the ruleset was revised. It was found that, according to the special rules, only cornermen had the authority to stop the match by throwing the towel, which ruled Noguchi's decision illegal. The Gracie side insisted further that the chokehold had been defended and therefore Royce had not fallen unconscious. Hélio initially believed Yoshida had no fault on the incident, but after hearing him stating in an interview his belief that Royce had been choked out, Hélio and Royce accused the judoka of lacking "courage and morality," They also accused the promoters and specialized press of unfairly favoring Yoshida out of nationalism. When asked about the instance in which Royce's hand seemed to go limp, his cornerman Pedro Valente claimed Royce was actually "relaxing so that he could catch Yoshida's movement."

For his part, Yoshida reiterated he felt no resistance on Gracie before calling the referee's attention, and addressed the illegal stoppage by opining it was the promoters' responsibility to deal with. However, as he had previously said the mic, he was open to the possibility of a rematch, stating, "we can do it separately. If [the Gracies] aren't satisfied, I will do it until they are."

Judges were gathered in the time scheduled by Ishii, but despite confirming the technical incorrection of the stoppage, deliberations extended until November 11. After interviewing Noguchi, examining video footage, and consulting combat sports experts, Pride rule director Yuji Shimada declared the promoters would finally keep the result as Yoshida's victory by knockout. They concluded there were reasons to argue that Royce had lost consciousness for a brief time, and it was approved that Noguchi had acted out to protect Royce's life, fearing the possibility that the Gracie team could leave Royce to die on a locked chokehold. Under those circumstances, victory was implicitly supported by the danger having come from a legal technique. However, Pride chairman Naoto Morishita acknowledged the fiasco, and promised the promotion would ban rulesets that obstructed the referee's power to stop the match, arguing humanitary reasons. Although the next matchup discussed for Yoshida was a possible place as Nobuhiko Takada's retirement opponent, Morishita also revealed they intended to host a rematch with Royce.

In any case, reception in the martial arts community remained divided. The North American mixed martial arts community sided with the Gracies through the process, calling Yoshida a "cheater" without any real skill who was being protected by Pride. Meanwhile, combat sports press in Japan considered Yoshida a clean winner regardless of the controversy, with Goro Takamura commenting that, analyzing Royce's position, "it would have been almost impossible for him to advance the game in any advantageous manner and escape the hold" even if the match was not stopped. The resultant controversy affected Yoshida for the rest of his career, earning the description by Dave Meltzer that, "There are two different versions of Yoshida — the Japanese and the American. The Japanese version has Yoshida as a submission expert, one of the best judokas of modern times, anywhere in the world. [...] In the U.S., while not universal, there is a common theme among many people. He’s a fake. A cheater."

== Rematch ==
After intense negotiations, the long-awaited rematch was finally realized in 2003, being scheduled for the Pride Shockwave event in December. There were problems in Yoshida's camp about accepting the matchup, as Yoshida had participated in the PRIDE 2003 Middleweight Grand Prix two months before and still carried injuries from his famously brutal bout with Wanderlei Silva, but he accepted nonetheless, declaring, "I want to get over my injuries through my mental strength." He had to rest through the first month and train the second. On the other hand, Royce underwent an intense training designed to avoid further gi chokes, expressing "I will be happy punching Yoshida's face."

The match was hosted under full MMA rules, but the Gracie camp demanded a series of modifications in order to prevent another compromising situation. It would be contested again in two 10-minute rounds, though this time stalling at the mat would be limited to a period of one minute, leading to a standing restart afterwards. Another of the Gracie demands banned Noguchi or Shimada from serving as the referees of the match, leading Pride to appoint Matt Hume, usually a judge for Pride, as a special referee. There would not be judges either, meaning the match would go automatically to draw if lacking a finish. Finally, and despite Morishita's claims, the bout would feature again a rule forbidding the referee from stopping the match, allowing only the cornermen to do so by throwing the towel. By security reasons, only one cornerman would be let at ringside.

=== The fight ===
- Date: December 31, 2003
- Venue: Saitama Super Arena, Saitama, Japan
- Title(s) on the line: N/A

Tale of the tape
Boxer	(Japan) Hidehiko Yoshida	(Brazil) Royce Gracie
Nickname	"The Golden Judo King"	"The Ultimate Fighter”
Hometown	Obu, Aichi, Japan	Torrance, California, United States
Pre-fight record	3–1–1	12–1–2
Height	5 ft 11 in (1.80 m)	6 ft 0 in (1.83 m)
Weight	225 lb (102 kg)	176 lb (80 kg)
Style	Judo	Brazilian jiu-jitsu
Recognition	1992 Summer Olympics judo gold medalist 1999 World Judo Championships gold medalist	UFC 1 Tournament winner UFC 2 Tournament winner UFC 4 Tournament winner

Result
- Technical draw after two rounds

Gracie entered the arena with his brother Royler as his selected cornerman, while Yoshida did the same with Tsuyoshi Kohsaka. Right before the bell rang, Gracie took off his gi jacket, electing to fight without it for the first time in his career. This was done in order to reduce Yoshida's chances to grip at his upper body.

The fight opened with Royce feinting strikes before hitting Yoshida with an illegal low blow. While Yoshida recovered from the pain, Hume warned Gracie with a yellow card, although the absence of judges meant warnings would be only decisive in case of a fight-stopping foul. After the fight restarted, the judoka landed a left hook/right uppercut combination and forced Gracie to drop down to the mat. The Brazilian attempted an ankle lock from the ground, but Yoshida blocked it and captured the Brazilian's back, ending up on half mount. The judoka then stood up and fought his opponent's grips from the feet, while Gracie controlled his sleeves and pursued a heel hook from the bottom. After interrupting the subsequent leglock exchange, Yoshida stood up again and the action slowed down for minutes, with Gracie pursuing further leglocks from a leg entanglement.

Roughly five minutes into the match, Yoshida escaped the hold and captured Gracie's back again, but the Brazilian managed to roll him to the side and escape. Although Yoshida then tried an armbar, Gracie avoided it and achieved his own half mount. The Brazilian scored several punches to the ribs in an attempt to fully mount him, to which the Japanese answered by trying a sode guruma jime from the bottom. At the ending minutes of the round, capitalizing on a failed escape by Yoshida, Royce captured his back. He spent the rest of the round pursuing a choke and scoring light punches, while Yoshida defended from behind until the end of the time.

At the second round, avoiding Yoshida's punches via ranged kicks, Gracie shot for a single leg takedown. Yoshida blocked and kneeled down on half mount, but Gracie answered by pursuing an ankle lock from the bottom. As in the previous round, the Japanese stood up and fought grips with a supine Royce, who benefitted from his lack of jacket to grapple with less risk of being grabbed. After some minutes, Yoshida eventually fell back for his own ankle hold. The fighters struggled with the exchange, reversing their positions back and forth, until Gracie capitalized on a visibly tired Yoshida to gain the mount. Royce landed several punches, eventually getting Yoshida to turtle up underneath him. The judoka then focused on preventing any submission and just enduring the strikes, while Gracie continued punching methodically for the next minutes, without attempting ulterior moves, until the end of the match.

With the bout's result being announced as the perfunctory draw, Royce immediately engaged in winning celebrations, while Yoshida recovered from his knees with the opposite appearance.

=== Reception ===
Despite the technical draw, most pundits acknowledged Gracie's dominant performance this time, albeit without missing the irony that it had been precisely due to the rules demanded by the Gracie team that Royce had not won a unanimous decision. Still, the bout's critical reception was mixed, with Maxfighting.com reviewing it under the quote, "I'm not sure if the fans got what they wanted, but Royce sure seemed happy. [...] Other than that, no one really seemed in trouble." Accordingly, the Gracie side was satisfied with the outcome. Royce praised Yoshida's toughness and will, but reaffirmed his own victory and considered it a worthy rematch.

On the other side, Japanese fans were upset at Yoshida's role in the match. Even if it was acknowledged that his injuries and Royce's sudden decision to fight without jacket had stunted his performance, Japanese fans considered his performance underwhelming. The judoka himself expressed frustration with his own health and performance, and reiterated his wish of a rubber match against Royce. He was quoted as, "this time it ended in his way, but if there's a chance to do it again, I wonder if [Gracie] will be so satisfied. I want to properly if I have the opportunity to do it again." A rubber match was sought after by the Pride promoters, but Gracie declined and it never took place.
