= Mixed martial arts in Japan =

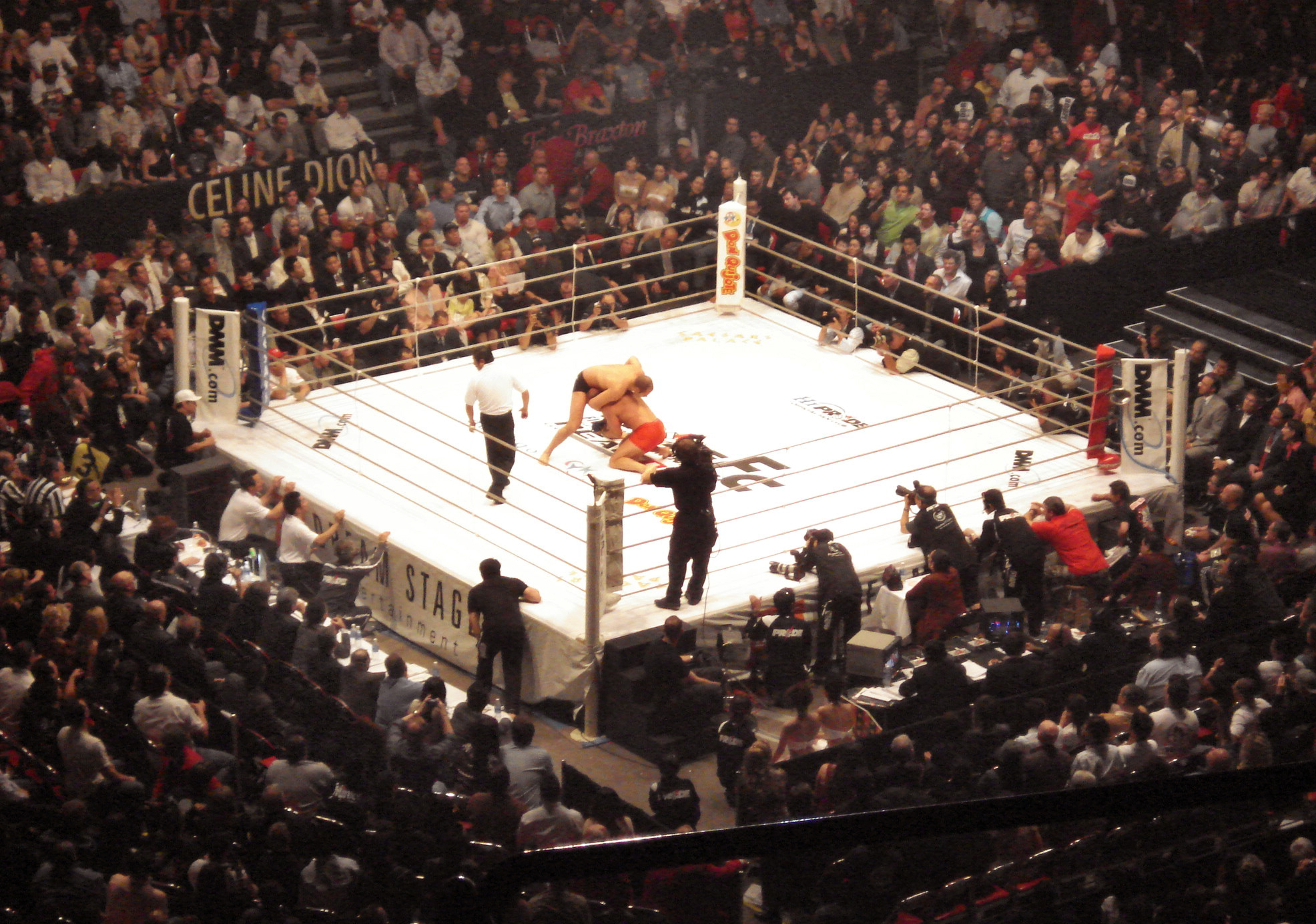
- A Pride Fighting Championships bout in 2006

Audience records
- Single match: 91,107

Mixed martial arts in Japan has been a popular sport since at least the 1980s, practiced at both the professional and amateur levels. Today, Japan is considered one of the birthplaces of modern MMA, and many fans credit the country with the existence of this modern combat sport.

== History ==
Muhammad Ali vs. Antonio Inoki took place in Japan between American boxer Muhammad Ali and Japanese wrestler Antonio Inoki in 1976. The classic match-up between professional boxer and professional wrestler turned sour as each fighter refused to engage in the other's style of fighting style, and after 15 round stalemate it was declared a draw. This was the earliest example of modern mixed martial arts in Japan.

Pride FC for much of early 21st century in the 2000s was one of the preeminent Mixed martial arts organizations until it was discovered it was being run by the Yakuza.

Since the 2010s, MMA in Japan has seen a sharp decline in popularity in television viewership and popularity.

== Domestic organizations ==
The major MMA organizations in Japan are Rizin Fighting Federation, DEEP, Pancrase, Shooto and ROMAN COMBAT.
