= Kazushi Sakuraba vs. Royce Gracie =

Mixed martial arts fight between Kazushi Sakuraba and Royce Gracie in 2000

The mixed martial arts fight between Kazushi Sakuraba and Royce Gracie was held in 2000 at PRIDE Fighting Championships. Due to its special rules, it lasted 90 minutes before ending with the victory of Sakuraba by TKO. It has been widely considered one of the greatest and most influential MMA fights of all time, as well as a vital part of the rivalry between the Gracie family and Sakuraba, who gained the nickname "Gracie Hunter" after the match. It was followed by a rematch in 2007 in K-1 Dynamite!! USA, where Gracie defeated Sakuraba in controversial fashion and tested positive for steroids after the bout.

== Background ==
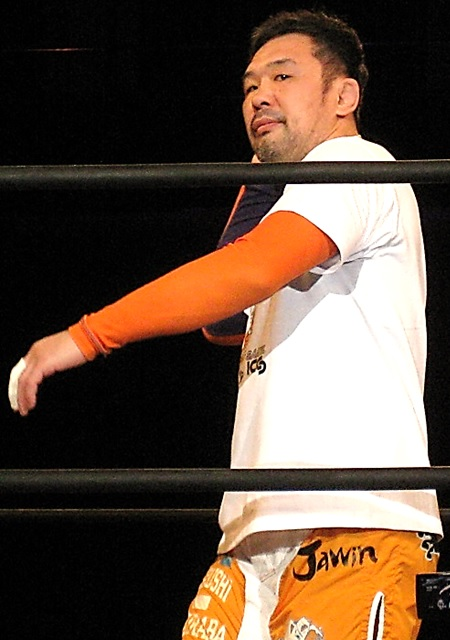
Kazushi Sakuraba in 2015.

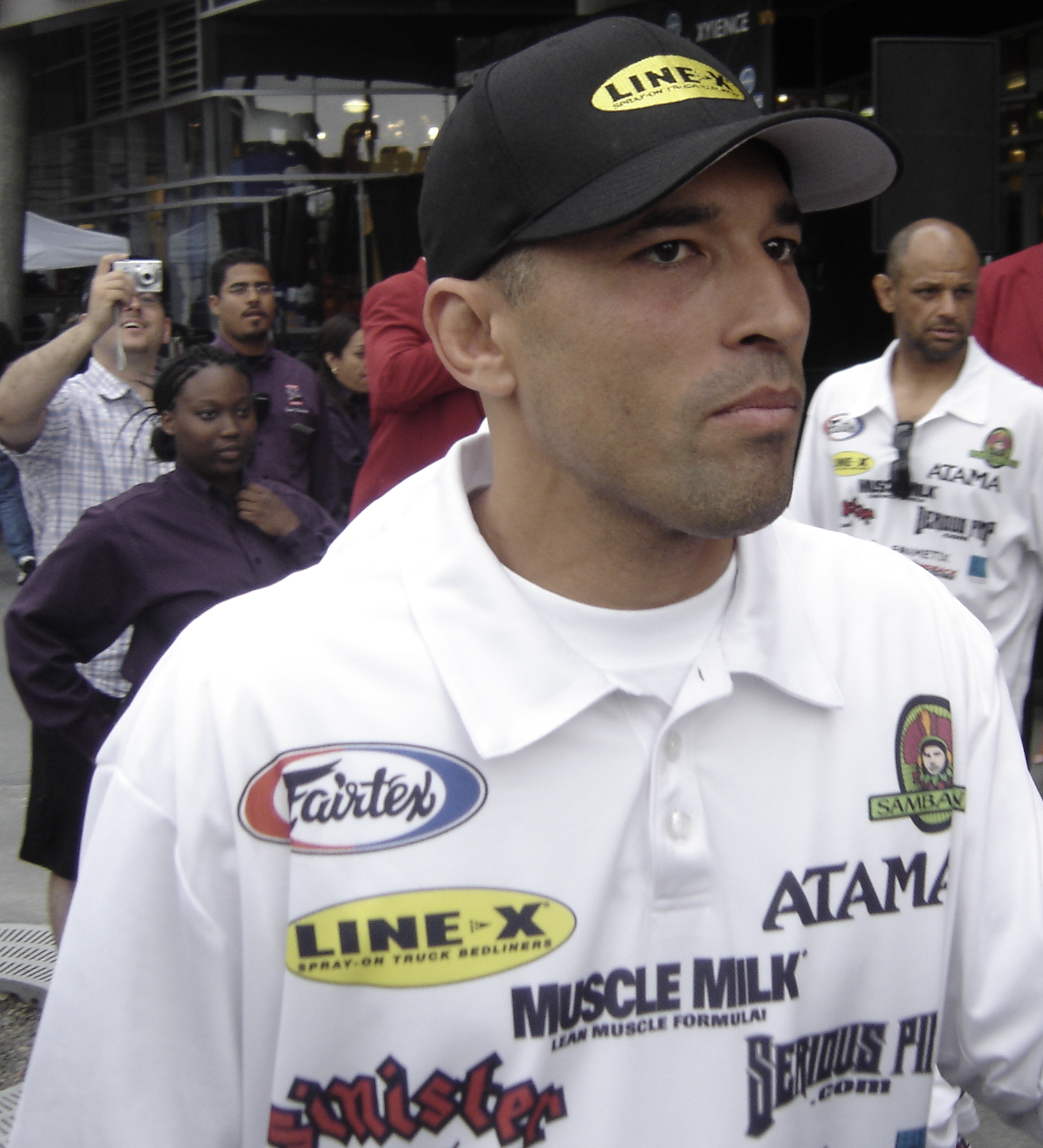
Royce Gracie in 2007.

The rivalry between Kazushi Sakuraba from Takada Dojo and the Gracie family of Brazilian jiu-jitsu practitioners started in PRIDE 8, when Sakuraba faced Royler Gracie, though it actually traced back to the first PRIDE Fighting Championships event, PRIDE 1, where Royler's brother Rickson had defeated Sakuraba's stablemaster Nobuhiko Takada. The victory over Takada had served to cement the Gracie family's reputation in Japan and continue the spreading of their family art as it had happened in United States with the Ultimate Fighting Championship venture. However, the match between Sakuraba and Royler changed this opinion. Sakuraba, a professional wrestler of the shoot-style kind (a mixture of catch wrestling, judo, sambo, muay thai and other arts), dominated Royler both standing and on the ground and defeated him by the way of Kimura lock, following up with a challenge to Rickson himself. This loss was the first for the Gracie family in decades (coincidentally, by the same move as the last time they lost to a Japanese fighter in Masahiko Kimura vs. Hélio Gracie), and marked the question whether their approach to mixed martial arts, mainly based on Brazilian jiu-jitsu alone, could still hold up against a well-rounded, cross-trained fighter like Sakuraba. The Gracie side argued Royler's loss should not be counted, as it had happened by referee stoppage, an action that went directly against the special ruleset they had requested for that fight. In order to clear this out and issue a challenge, undefeated UFC champion and Royler's and Rickson's brother Royce agreed to sign up with PRIDE, which had previously been in contact with him for an abandoned matchup with Mark Kerr.

"I have my demands. It’s not exactly special treatment. My family, my father, created this fighting business. What he created in Brazil a long time ago, the challenge matches, it’s why we have Pride, the UFC, Strikeforce."

— Royce Gracie about the match's rules.

Upon the annunciation of the PRIDE Grand Prix openweight tournament in 2000, it was known both Royce and Sakuraba were going to partake, so a match between the two was anticipated. This matchup eventually realized after the first round of the tournament on January 30, as they both eliminated their respective opponents: Gracie defeated Nobuhiko Takada by decision, while Sakuraba defeated Guy Mezger after a retirement due to contract issues. With this resolution, they were slated to fight each other. However, seeking to prevent a situation like the Royler match, the Gracie side demanded special rules for the match. Their representative Rorion Gracie called for an unlimited number of 15 minute rounds, no judges, no referee stoppages, and only knockout, submission or towel throw as ways to win. Sakuraba found these demands inappropriate, while Royce defended himself by underlining the role of his family in the history of MMA and by pointing out he was already at a weight disadvantage in the match (actually just 7 lbs). Mark Kerr, who competed at the same tournament, supported Sakuraba's criticism on the personalized rules. Eventually, Sakuraba accepted, and characteristically joked about wearing a diaper to the match in prevision of its unlimited length, as well as learning ventriloquism to deceive the referee into believing Gracie had submitted. However, upon finding Royce absent from the rule meeting the day before the match, he engaged in a brief trash talking, criticizing the Gracie family and accusing them of hypocrisy and cowardice.

"Crazy and Gracie sound more similar in Japanese, but they really are crazy. I can't even put into words my feelings for them. I'll take you on, with your own rules. Let me say that it is due to expressionless Royce and his relative Rorion that we have this no-rules fighting. But isn't it that this fire that they lit has gotten bigger than them and now they are running away from it?"

— Kazushi Sakuraba at the rule meeting on April 30, 2000.

Sakuraba would reveal that, although Gracie's cornermen later reacted at these declarations, Royce himself took no offense and wished them both for a good fight.

== The fight ==
- Date: May 1, 2000
- Venue: Tokyo Dome, Tokyo, Japan
- Title(s) on the line: N/A

Tale of the tape
Boxer	(Japan) Kazushi Sakuraba	(Brazil) Royce Gracie
Nickname	"The I.Q. Wrestler"	"The Ultimate Fighter”
Hometown	Showa, Akita, Japan	Torrance, California, United States
Pre-fight record	8–1–1 (1)	12–0–1
Height	5 ft 11 in (1.80 m)	6 ft 0 in (1.83 m)
Weight	183 lb (83 kg)	176 lb (80 kg)
Style	Shoot wrestling	Brazilian jiu-jitsu
Recognition	UFC Ultimate Japan Heavyweight Tournament winner Kingdom One Million Yen Tournament winner	UFC 1 Tournament winner UFC 2 Tournament winner UFC 4 Tournament winner

Result
- Sakuraba won by TKO at the sixth round

The match took place at the Tokyo Dome in front of an audience of 38,429 people. While Gracie made his entrance performing the famous "Gracie train" with his relatives and teammates, including Rorion and Hélio Gracie, Sakuraba came wearing a Super Strong Machine wrestling mask and accompanied by Daijiro Matsui and Minoru Toyonaga in identical attires and masks, making impossible to tell which of them was the Japanese fighter until he unmasked in the ring. At that moment, Sakuraba revealed his hair dyed bright orange, which was part of a bet he had made with a Japanese TV comedian. Unlike Royce, who chose to wear a full Brazilian jiu-jitsu gi for the fight, the Japanese wore his orange wrestling tights. Professional wrestler Antonio Inoki and musician Eric Clapton came to the ring to present them with flower bouquets.

Sakuraba opened the fight scoring a single leg takedown right after the opening bell. When Gracie returned to his feet, they clinched and went against the ropes. Unable to properly hit Sakuraba, Gracie pulled guard and attempted to seize his opponent's leg for a leglock, but Sakuraba escaped by turning his back. The Brazilian then got up and clamped to his back, only for Sakuraba to grab a Kimura lock from behind and drop down to try to complete the hold. The fight moved to the corner, where Gracie tried to free himself from the hold by raining hammerfists on Sakuraba's back and head, while the latter held position and stuck his head outside the ropes to counterbalance himself. Knowing the strikes lacked power to inflict damage, Sakuraba spent the time looking directly to a cameraman outside the ring and smiling to him, which drew cheers and laughs from the crowd. Referee Yuji Shimada separated them and restarted the fight, but the situation repeated itself, with Kazushi pursuing submissions from behind and Royce keeping himself active with short strikes. At the last seconds, the wrestler locked a kneebar that seemed decisive, but Royce managed to resist until the round time went out.

At the second round, the contenders clinched again against the ropes, where Gracie threw knee strikes to Kazushi's bandaged knee. A discussion happened at the four minutes mark, as Gracie refused to let the referee restart the fight. Still on the ropes, Sakuraba gripped the Brazilian's sleeve to hinder his strikes, and when Gracie tried to free it, the wrestler capitalized on the distraction to undo Gracie's obi, allowing him to grab more freely his uwagi. In response, Royce tried to drop down to guard, but Kazushi was able to pull him up back to standing. Finally finding an opening, the Brazilian scored several punches, but Sakuraba's control on his jacket shut his offense off, at one point even pulling the cloth over Royce's shoulders to confuse him while trying to cover his head with it. Gracie attempted now a standing guillotine choke, which Sakuraba countered with a takedown to half guard. Another tumult broke up when Royce hit an accidental knee to the groin, although not by the blow itself, which went unnoticed, but by their reactions; Royce apologized to Sakuraba, and the latter signaled his understanding by patting him reassuringly in the rear, making the Gracie corner believe he had tapped out. In any case, the choke was ultimately ineffective, with Sakuraba even toying with Royce's pants while trying to grab his belt. Again, the time ran off again without a conclusion.

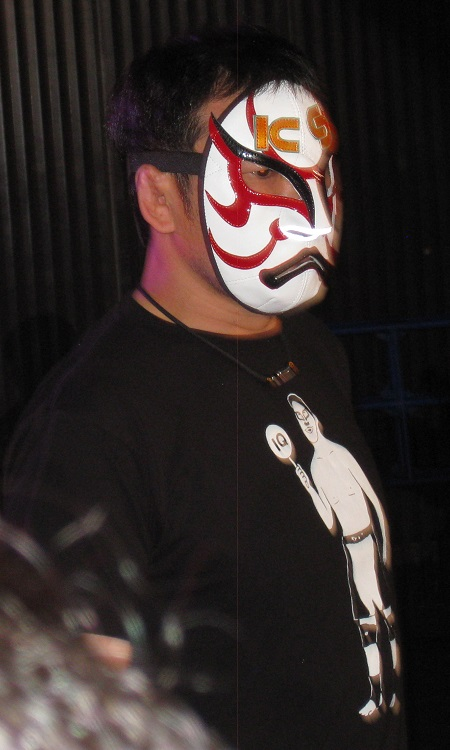
Sakuraba in one of his signature entrance masks.

The third round began with the already usual clinch against the ropes. After the Brazilian scored several punches, Sakuraba accidentally hit him with his own low blow, leading the referee to warn him. Once Gracie was given some minutes to recover, he tried a sweep, but the Japanese reversed it with a takedown and dropped him to his guard. As Sakuraba wasn't engaging him on the ground, Gracie got up and rammed him to the corner, where he looked to score foot stomps and knees, but the Japanese suddenly attacked with a flurry of right punches that knocked Gracie to the mat. Taken by surprise, the Brazilian initially opted to remain on the mat to stay safe, although he returned to his feet when Sakuraba started kicking his legs as he had done in the fight against Royler. As soon as the Brazilian fighter got up, Sakuraba landed a heavy low kick that made Gracie falter noticeably. During the next minutes, Royce attempted to reestablish the clinch, only for the now openly offensive Sakuraba to land both punching combinations and low kicks in every attempt. Shortly after, Sakuraba added theatrical Mongolian chops to his offense, using them to set up strikes and confuse his opponent. Royce eventually accomplished the clinch, but just a few seconds before the end of the round.

Finally acknowledging he was facing unexpected difficulties, Gracie decided to focus completely on the match instead of looking up to continue on the tournament. He started the fourth round aggressively, but Sakuraba grabbed his uwagi and dragged it around to nullify Gracie's offense. The Brazilian jiu-jitsu expert dropped down to his guard in an attempt to avoid the new tactic, which Sakuraba capitalized on to control him further by grabbing his gi trousers. This forced Gracie to stand up and keep himself mobile to avoid more grabs, but at the same time allowed Sakuraba to score more punching combinations and low kicks, clearly seeking to accumulate damage on Gracie's legs. Already limping and with a cut on his eye, Royce returned to his previous offensive strategy and tried his best to take Sakuraba down, but although he managed to capture Sakuraba's back, the shoot wrestler blocked all his takedown attempts. The round ended with Sakuraba on Gracie's half guard.

Sakuraba opened the fifth round with a low kick and a takedown, showing no signs of fatigue yet in stark contrast to his clearly worn down opponent. He besieged Royce's closed guard and landed ground and pound in the form of punches and Mongolian chops, which forced Gracie to open his legs. At that moment, the Japanese grabbed the Brazilian's trousers and dumped him over his head, capitalizing on the confusion to score several punches to the face. Gracie answered with a few strikes from the bottom and avoided a guard pass by establishing a butterfly guard, but Sakuraba stood up and scored a clean stomp on Gracie's face before the time expired.

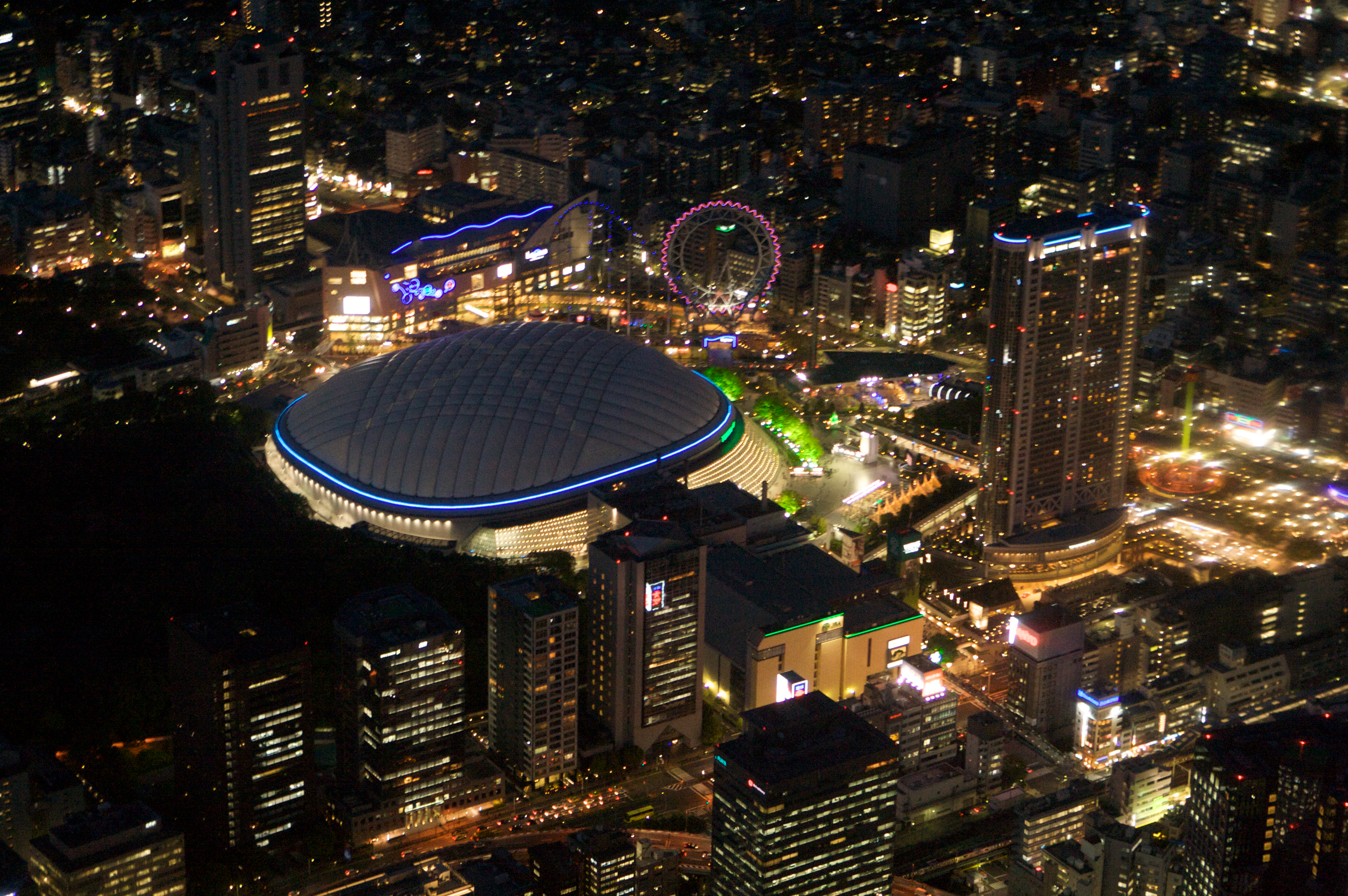
Tokyo Dome.

At the opening of the sixth round, Sakuraba took Gracie down and attacked his guard again. This time, Gracie hit a few heel kicks to the back of Sakuraba's head, pursuing an Ezequiel choke from the bottom that was unsuccessful. With both fighters standing again, Sakuraba landed repeated low kicks, punishing his opponent's legs even when the latter dropped to the mat in an attempt to avoid it. Gracie was able to slow the pace standing by ramming Sakuraba against a corner, but by this point the Brazilian was too exhausted and worn to follow up with a takedown attempt or a try to capture his back. A new low kick by the shoot wrestler sent Gracie to the mat, where Sakuraba rained strikes and punches through his guard. Sensing the final of the bout was approaching, Gracie tried takedowns and guard pulls in a last attempt, only for Sakuraba to block all of them and keep punishing his legs with kicks. The Japanese then jumped high over the jiu-jitsu expert's guard and landed a heavy flying punch just before the end of the time. During the rest, Royce sat on his corner stool and informed his teammates he was unable to walk because the damage to his legs (one of his femurs would be found to be fractured due to the accumulated kicks), and after some deliberation, finally Rorion Gracie threw the towel to concede the fight. Sakuraba was declared the winner after 90 minutes of fighting.

Despite the effort of such a fight, Sakuraba chose to advance round and continue fighting through the card, which put in a match minutes later against Igor Vovchanchyn. The Japanese performed dominantly enough to be granted an extra round, but the effects of his previous battle showed up and he decided to bow out of the tournament, being eliminated.

== Reception ==
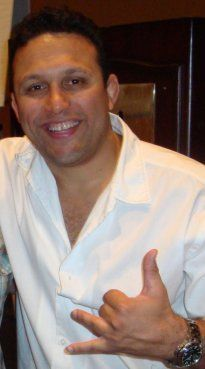
Renzo Gracie, Royce's second cousin, praised Sakuraba's skill and became his next opponent.

The match was not only met with appraisal, but also called one of the greatest matches in MMA history. Only in 2000, Dave Meltzer from Wrestling Observer Newsletter gave it the MMA Match of the Year award, while years later, Stephen Quadros put it as the receiver of "the biggest ovation he witnessed in his entire career", the first of many "pivotal events in mixed martial arts", and "the greatest fight in PRIDE Fighting Championships". These consideration have been echoed through the years, with Brain Knapp of Sherdog calling the fight "its historical significance off the charts", Mike Sloan from the same website placing it as the second top mixed martial arts bout ever, Pedro Olavarria from Fightland comparing it to the "Fight of the Century" between Joe Frazier and Muhammad Ali, and Jonathan Snowden stating in SB Nation that it "changed MMA history forever". In his book UFC's Ultimate Warriors: The Top 10, mixed martial arts insider Jeremy Wall commented: "No fight in MMA history, before or since, has come close to that length and still remained an exciting bout."

The fight, along with his performance the rest of the year, gained Sakuraba Wrestling Observer Newsletter´s 2000 Best Shootfighter and Tokyo Sports's Most Valuable Player awards, and cemented his rising status as PRIDE's main Japanese player. Also, even although defeated, Gracie also experienced a surge in popularity due to his own performance and will to fight through the many rounds. However, attention was put in the symbolic passing of the torch between Gracie, the original mixed martial arts icon and popularizer of groundfighting, and Sakuraba, the new generation fighter and emissary of a well-rounded fighting game. In his article "Sakuraba and NHB Fighting" for Black Belt in October 2000, Steven Keckan pondered: "Ten years ago, the no-holds-barred was still on its infancy in the United States and jujutsu stylists dominated the fighting circuit. [...] Now Sakuraba is turning the tables on the jujutsu fighters." He also concluded: "Other fighters should study this man carefully. We have seen the future of NHB fighting, and its name is Sakuraba."

Reception within the Gracie family was positive too. Renzo Gracie, second cousin to Royce, praised Sakuraba's spirit, fighting skill and entertaining ability during the fight, and stated he would fight him in the future. Royce and Rorion themselves appreciated his opponent's intelligence, and the former stated his belief Sakuraba would have won the entire tournament had not met him on the bracket. Royce also claimed he was willing to rematch him under different special rules, an idea supported by then PRIDE executive Naoto Morishita. However, this rematch didn't materialize, so Sakuraba fought Renzo instead in August at PRIDE 10. While there was expectation towards a possible match between Sakuraba and Rickson Gracie, whom the Japanese fighter had originally challenged after his bout with Royler, Morishita considered it improbable due to Rickson's own demands.

== Rematch ==
In May 2007, seven years after their fight, it was announced a rematch between Sakuraba and Gracie as part of the Dynamite!! USA event in June co-produced between K-1 and EliteXC. The announcement met a mixed reception, as while Gracie had fought only 4 bouts in the hiatus, Sakuraba had added a number of 21 fights to his record and was considered to be in significantly deficient health due to their toll. It was even questioned whether he could pass the medical tests mandated by the California State Athletic Commission, especially after he fainted during training months earlier and was diagnosed with vertebrobasilar damage, though he eventually passed them without trouble. Gracie, while acknowledged as in much better shape, was confident in that the Japanese fighter could fight him. The Brazilian fighter had cross-trained in muay thai for his previous fight against Matt Hughes at UFC 60, while the Japanese had polished his own skills in said art in the Chute Boxe camp after his bouts against CB member Wanderlei Silva.

=== The fight ===
- Date: June 2, 2007
- Venue: Los Angeles Memorial Coliseum, Los Angeles, California, United States
- Title(s) on the line: N/A

Tale of the tape
Boxer	(Japan) Kazushi Sakuraba	(Brazil) Royce Gracie
Nickname	"The I.Q. Wrestler" "The Gracie Hunter"	"The Ultimate Fighter”
Hometown	Showa, Akita, Japan	Torrance, California, United States
Pre-fight record	21–9–1 (2)	13–2–3
Height	5 ft 11 in (1.80 m)	6 ft 0 in (1.83 m)
Weight	187 lb (85 kg)	188 lb (85 kg)
Style	Shoot wrestling	Brazilian jiu-jitsu Muay thai
Recognition	UFC Ultimate Japan Heavyweight Tournament winner Kingdom One Million Yen Tournament winner	UFC 1 Tournament winner UFC 2 Tournament winner UFC 4 Tournament winner

Result
- Gracie won by unanimous decision

Royce made his entrance to the event wearing his trademark gi, but this time he took it off in order to fight in MMA shorts. Sakuraba followed shortly after, wearing a Chute Boxe jersey and a series of wrestling masks that he went peeling off theatrically while walking the ramp.

Sakuraba opened this fight by immediately knocking Royce down with a low kick and a right hand. Choosing to remain on the mat, the Brazilian defended with vigorous punches and upkicks when Sakuraba threatened with an ankle lock, so the Japanese resorted to kick his legs in trademark fashion, an exchange that drew boos from the crowd. When the Japanese fighter finally acceded to engage Gracie on the ground, he passed his guard with some punches and captured his back on the side, forcing Royce to stand up. After some struggle, in a reminiscence of their first match, Sakuraba grabbed a Kimura lock attempt and caused them to go between the ropes while Gracie struck him in an attempt to get free. The round ended with both exchanging kicks again.

At the next round, Sakuraba blocked a takedown attempt and tried to attack, but Royce charged with a clinch against the ropes. Advised of the wrestler's long time injury, Gracie focused his efforts in landing knees at Sakuraba's bandaged knee. The action slowed down while they fought at the clinch, which attracted again the crowd's disapproval, and it was only interrupted when referee Mario Yamasaki restarted the bout. Retaking the action, Sakuraba stopped another takedown and landed several knees from a classic muay thai clinch. In response, Royce moved them against the ropes, where they exchanged body shots and knees until the end of the round. Both fighters acknowledged the other's effort and hugged in the rest time.

At the third and final round, the Japanese scored a takedown. When Royce answered with a Kimura lock attempt from his guard, Sakuraba capitalized on it to pass his guard and catch his back. Gracie stood up, but Sakuraba threatened him again with his own Kimura attempt, so the Brazilian threw strikes at his head, although the wrestler managed to block most of them with his glove and shoulder. With 40 seconds remaining, Gracie shot for two takedowns, but Sakuraba blocked them, captured his back again and started to work for an armbar while Gracie defended. However, the time expired with the Japanese still pursuing the submission.

After the match, judges Richard Bertrand, Nelson Hamilton and Cecil Peoples scored the contest as 30–27, 29–28, and 29–28, all three for Gracie, who was thus declared winner by unanimous decision. Sakuraba and him hugged again and were greeted on the ring by Hélio Gracie.

=== Reception ===
In marked contrast to their first bout, the match's reception was negative. Not only the fight was considered "lackluster" or even "embarrassing" by a number of reviewers, the very decision of the judges to award Gracie the victory instead of Sakuraba garnered a heated controversy. In its official play-by-play of the match, MMA website Sherdog actually scored the bout two rounds to one in favor of Sakuraba, a score agreed upon by a majority of fans polled, and deemed him the victor over Gracie. Even Jake Rossen's later review from the same website, while criticizing both men's performances and ultimately considering the match a draw, disagreed with Gracie being given all the three rounds. The sentiment was summed by MMA Oddsbreaker by stating: "no one but Royce can say with much confidence that he beat Sakuraba that night".

Chemical formula of Nandrolone.

== Steroids results ==
On 14 June, the CSAC revealed Gracie had tested positive for the anabolic steroid Nandrolone, a performance enhancing drug banned in all professional sports, in his pre and postfight drug tests. While Nandrolone occurs naturally in the human body in amounts between 2 ng/mL and 6 ng/mL, both of Gracie's samples provided a level of over 50 ng/mL, ruling out the possibility of a false positive. He was suspended for 12 months after the date of the match and fined with $2,500, the maximum penalty allowable in California. Gracie pleaded ignorance and claimed he had not increased any mass for the match, but this was contradicted by observation and an official ESPN article about their official weights. Unlike most MMA promotions in American ground, Dynamite!! could not legally overturn the result of the match due to an infraction, so Royce's victory was kept in his record. Nevertheless, the revelation impacted even more negatively on the sport's perception of the Brazilian fighter and his achievement, eventually becoming one of the top steroid scandals in MMA history. Carlos Matallanas from El Confidencial wrote: "what may have been the definitive redemption of the Gracies turned out another taint, this time indelible, in the honor of their family".
