= Masahiko Kimura vs. Hélio Gracie =

Martial arts fight between Kimura and Gracie

- Date: October 23, 1951
- Venue: Maracanã Stadium, Rio de Janeiro, Brazil
- Title(s) on the line: N/A

Tale of the tape
Boxer	(Brazil) Hélio Gracie	(Japan) Masahiko Kimura
Hometown	Rio de Janeiro, Brazil	Tokyo, Japan
Style	Brazilian jiu-jitsu	Judo
Recognition	None	None at the time

Result
- Kimura won by technical submission at the second round

The fight between Japanese judoka Masahiko Kimura and Brazilian jiu-jitsu founder Hélio Gracie was held at the Maracanã Stadium in Rio de Janeiro, Brazil on October 23, 1951. It was held as a special challenge, with no titles on the line: Gracie was the self-proclaimed national jiu-jitsu champion, seen as a regular judo 6th dan by Kimura, while Kimura, dubbed the world's jiu-jitsu champion by the Brazilian press, was coming from a career in professional wrestling and teaching of judo. The result of the fight was a victory for Kimura by technical submission.

== Background ==
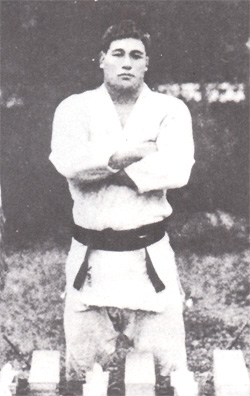
Kimura in 1941.

In 1949, after competing in Hawaii, Kimura and his professional wrestling troupe formed by 6th dan Toshio Yamaguchi and 5th dan Yukio Kato traveled to Brazil by invitation of Ryo Mizuno from the São Paulo Shimbun newspaper. The idea had been proposed by resident judoka Takeo Yano due to his very public enmity with the brothers Carlos and Hélio Gracie, practitioners of "jiu-jitsu" (as judo was called in Brazil at the time). Yano had competed against Hélio in a jiu-jitsu match in 1937, dominating the bout but being unable to avoid a time draw, so he had asked for a rematch over the years to no avail (he had also worked extensively in catch wrestling events with George Gracie, who wasn't considered to be at Carlos' and Hélio's side at the time). Expecting Kimura's troupe to attract Gracie's interest for a challenge match, Yano and his partner Yasuichi Ono helped Mizuno to bring them to Brazil.

When the troupe arrived at São Paulo, Kimura was bestowed with the fictional title of "world's jiu-jitsu champion" by the Brazilian press, which saw it as an opportunity to draw attention. The newspapers also hailed the three judokas as legitimate black belts in the art of jiu-jitsu while deriding the Gracie brothers as fake black belts. As expected, Hélio Gracie challenged the alleged champion to a match, though demanding Kimura to fight Gracie's apprentice Pedro Hemeterio first in order to prove he was a true champion. In response, the troupe demanded Hélio face Yukio Kato, the lowest ranked member of the group and the most similar to him in size, weighing both around 70 kg (154 lbs). After some negotiations, Hélio accepted and trained to fight Kato. As Kato was relatively inexperienced in challenge matches, while Gracie had several on his record, the bout was advertised as a special fight between a professional and an amateur.

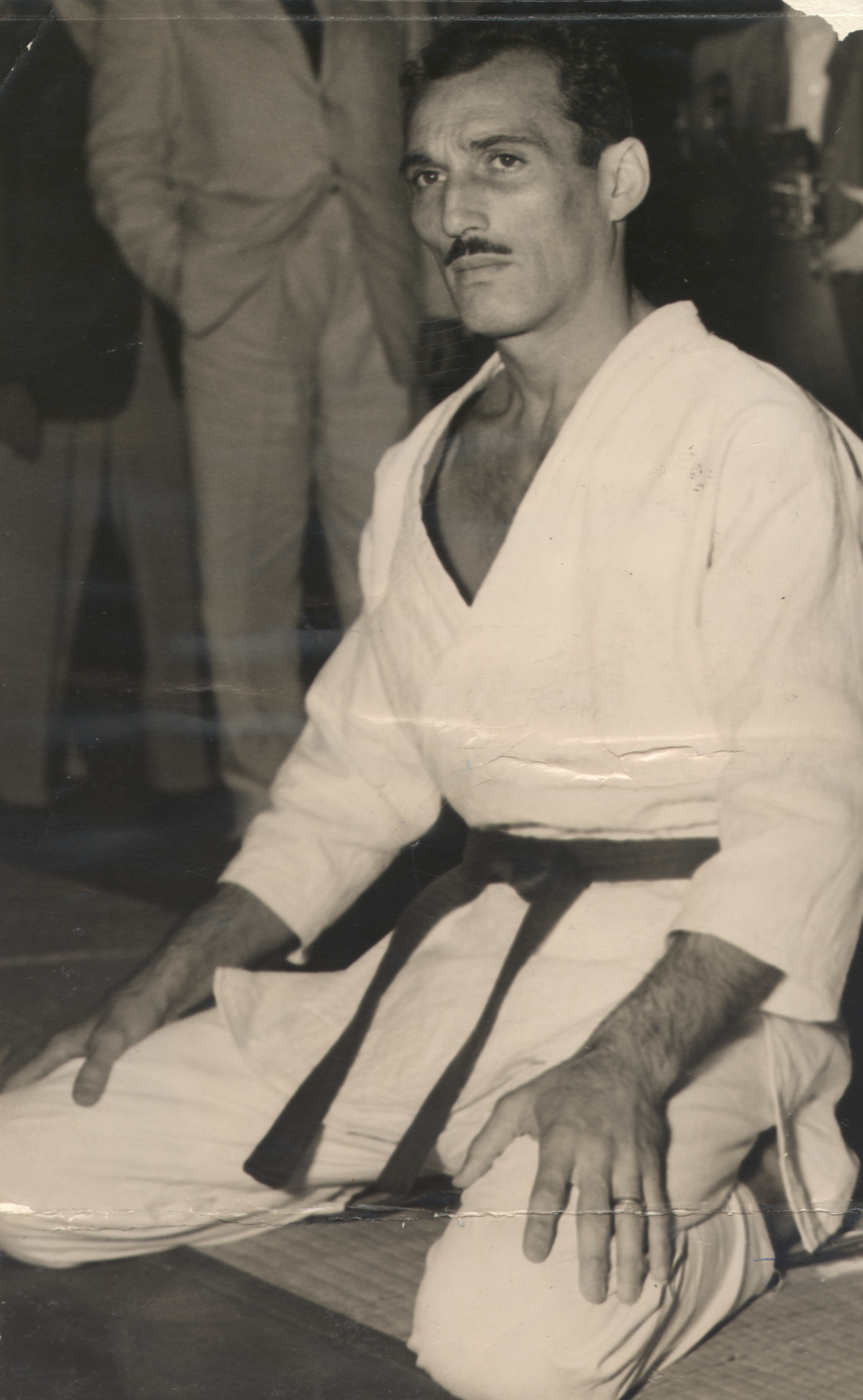
Gracie in 1952.

Kato and Hélio faced off on September 6, 1951 at Maracanã Stadium in Rio de Janeiro. The three-round match was controlled by Kato thanks to his superiority at throwing, but the mats were too soft to make his throws decisive and thus Hélio was able to perform ukemi-waza until the end of the time, ending the match in a draw. As the crowds were unsatisfied, Kato offered Hélio a rematch, this time without time limits. The match took place on September 29 at the Ginásio do Ibirapuera in São Paulo. Again, Kato dominated the early rounds and threw Hélio several times, even tossing him out of the ring at one point. After half an hour of fighting, Kato decided to take the bout to the ground and attempted to choke Gracie with juji-jime, which caused them to become entangled with the ring ropes when Hélio tried to counter with his own. At that moment, Kato froze in the belief the referee would stop the action to disentangle them and drag them away from the ropes, but it didn't happen, which allowed Hélio to lock his choke during Kato's mistake. Although Kato, whom the ropes impeded from repositioning, tried to counter it by resuming his hold, he lost consciousness, forcing Kimura to throw the towel.

While newspapers immediately questioned Hélio’s victory, with Diário de Notícias pointing out the illegality of his action, the loss still affected the troupe's reputation among the Japanese population of Brazil, who now saw them as phonies. Gracie's students paraded through the streets carrying a coffin, symbolizing Kato's defeat, and Hélio challenged next Toshio Yamaguchi, the second in rank and experience of the three Japanese men. Yamaguchi accepted, but Kimura volunteered himself to fight in his place. It was announced that Yamaguchi rejected the challenge for fear of injury and that he would be replaced by Kimura, and the match was set in October 23. Until then, Hélio trained at the Gracie Academy, while Kimura trained at Yasuichi and Naoichi Ono's academy. Expectation was such that, according to Georges Mehdi, Kimura was warned by the Japanese embassy that he would not be welcomed back in Japan if he lost the match.

A peculiar incident happened three days before the bout when a newspaper published a headline saying Kimura was not a Japanese martial artist, but a bluffer of Japanese-Peruvian descent (or Cambodian, according to Kimura's account). Kimura was forced to present his passport at the Japanese embassy to get the newspaper to rectify.

== Rules ==
The match was contested under what Hélio called the jiu-jitsu rule. They would fight in judogi, with all sorts of grappling moves allowed and the winner decided by submission or TKO only. The match was set for three ten-minute rounds. Kimura saw it as different from the judo or professional wrestling ruleset he was accustomed to working under. The referee chosen by the Confederação Brasileira de Pugilismo, not without some dispute with the Gracie side, was Eusébio de Queirós Filho.

The match had no weigh-in and none of the fighters were weighed in earlier, so the exact weights of Gracie and Kimura remain unknown. While shorter than Hélio, Kimura was certainly the heavier of the two, with an advantage that has been estimated between 10 kg (22 lbs.) and 15 kg (33 Ibs.)

== The match ==
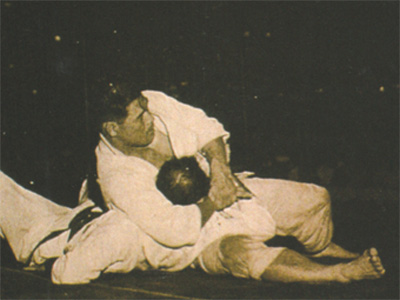
Kimura holding Gracie in kesa-gatame.

The bout between Gracie and Kimura took place again in the Maracanã Stadium in front of an audience of 20,000 people, including president of Brazil Getúlio Vargas and vice president João Café Filho, as well as renowned Japanese writer Michiharu Mishima. The Gracie sympathizers brought another coffin to symbolize Kimura would lose just like Kato, and Kimura himself was received in the arena with raw eggs and insults by the Brazilian crowds.

At the start of the first round, Hélio and Kimura immediately went to a clinch. The Brazilian tried to throw his opponent down with osoto gari and kouchi gari, but Kimura blocked them and in turn started scoring multiple throws, including ouchi gari, harai goshi, uchi mata and ippon seoi nage. However, Gracie was able to perform ukemi safely thanks to the soft mat used in the match, so Kimura couldn't subdue him by throwing alone. At the end of the round, the Japanese dropped Gracie with osoto gari and engaged in a brief ground struggle. He pinned Hélio and switched between kuzure-kami-shiho-gatame, yoko-shiho-gatame, yoko-sankaku-jime and kesa-gatame. At one point, probably during the yoko-sankaku-jime, the pressure was such that Gracie lost consciousness without Kimura noticing, only waking up when Kimura released his hold in order to switch to another position. Later, Kimura realized Gracie's ear was dripping blood and asked if he was okay. As Hélio nodded, Kimura continued until the bell call.

During the rest between the rounds, Masahiko told his cornerman Hikaru Kurachi that he had used the time of the round to punish Hélio and to put a show of dominance for the fans who were upset by Kato's loss. He also said he had grappled with Gracie on the ground in the last minutes in order to test his ground fighting skills, and that he would finish him off at the next round. In his autobiography, he recounted how he had been forced to relinquish his initial plan of knocking out Gracie due to the mat's softness and to plan a new way to win between throw and throw. Meanwhile, Gracie was confident in his skills to keep avoiding Kimura's throws and find his opportunity to submit him.

Entering the second round, after blocking a tomoe nage attempt by Gracie, Kimura threw him to the mat by osoto gari, and this time he followed him to the ground right after and pinned him with kuzure-kami-shiho-gatame. The judoka held him in place for almost three minutes before moving his weight over Gracie's head. Unable to breathe under Kimura, Gracie tried to get out by pushing with his arm, and at the moment Kimura seized the limb and executed gyaku-ude-garami. Hélio did not surrender, so Kimura rotated the arm until it broke. As Gracie still refused to give up, Masahiko twisted the arm further and broke it again. Finally, when the judoka was about to twist it a third time, Hélio's brother Carlos threw the towel. He also walked into the mat and tapped Kimura's back twice, signaling desistance. Kimura was thus declared winner. A crowd of Japanese people came and tossed Kimura high in celebration while Hélio was helped out to tend his arm.

== Aftermath ==
The match was well received by the press, which focused on how easily Kimura had disposed of Gracie, yet also on how valiantly Gracie had faced such a strong opponent, calling the match both an "Easy Victory for Kimura" ("Vitória Fácil de Kimura") and "13 Minutes of Intense Emotion" ("13 Minutos de Intensa Emoção"). However, at least one newspaper called it a moral victory for Gracie, an opinion shared by the Gracie side, with Hélio claiming to consider himself a world champion too after the match. On the other hand, Kimura declared himself disappointed with Hélio and criticized his inability to fight by the Kodokan judo rule and his excessive defensiveness, although he praised his defense itself and his fighting spirit. He also offered Gracie a rematch in Japan, but the offer met no answer.

After his 1951 tour through Brazil, Kimura and his troupe returned to Japan, founding Kokusai Pro Wrestling Association in order to continue doing professional wrestling. Hélio and Carlos continued fighting and teaching in Brazil for the rest of their careers, facing next the challenge of judokas Yasuichi Ono (who had already fought Hélio in 1935) and Augusto Cordeiro. However, this next feud was short-lived, as Cordeiro and Ono eventually distanced themselves from different style matches in order to join the rising judo scene. Their role was occupied instead by Mestre Sinhozinho, an associate to Cordeiro who challenged the Gracies in 1953.

== Legacy ==
As a tribute to Kimura's victory, the gyaku-ude-garami he used to defeat Gracie was renamed as "Kimuriana" by sports writers as soon as his second tour in Brazil in 1959. The name was eventually shortened to "Kimura", which has since been commonly referred to as in Brazilian jiu-jitsu and more recently mixed martial arts circles.

The match was introduced in American popular culture in 1992 with the documentary Gracies in Action, in which it featured heavily as one of the Gracie family's challenge matches. The tape contained a number of inaccuracies, like listing Kato' and Kimura's weight advantages over Hélio in respectively 40 Ibs and 80 Ibs, claiming Kimura had said that if Helio could resist him for 3 minutes he and not Kimura should be considered the winner, and having Kimura supposedly inviting Gracie to teach in an "Imperial Academy" in Japan. A similar version was given in the 1989 Playboy magazine article. Those claims have been since discredited as propaganda by the Brazilian jiu-jitsu community.

In 2002, Japanese MMA promotion PRIDE Fighting Championships hosted a special "judo vs Brazilian jiu-jitsu" bout as a tribute to the match between Kimura and Gracie. It took place on August 28, 2002 at the event PRIDE Shockwave and pitted Olympic gold medalist judoka Hidehiko Yoshida against Ultimate Fighting Championship tournament winner Royce Gracie, Hélio's own son. Fighting under grappling rules with limited striking, the two fought for seven minutes, with Yoshida ultimately applying a sode guruma jime for the referee stoppage. This ending was controversial, however, as Royce claimed the stoppage to have been unjustified, and it was changed to a no contest by Hélio Gracie's demand.

In his 2008 book The Pyjama Game, British judoka Mark Law mentions the match between Kimura and Gracie while reviewing a sparring session at the Budokwai between Olympic gold medalist Kenzo Nakamura and multiple BJJ world champion Roger Gracie, an affair he described as "prolonged and inconclusive, but nevertheless quite extraordinary."

== See also ==
- Kazushi Sakuraba vs. Royce Gracie
- Hidehiko Yoshida vs. Royce Gracie
- Mestre Sinhozinho
