= Yuji Shimada =

Japanese martial arts referee

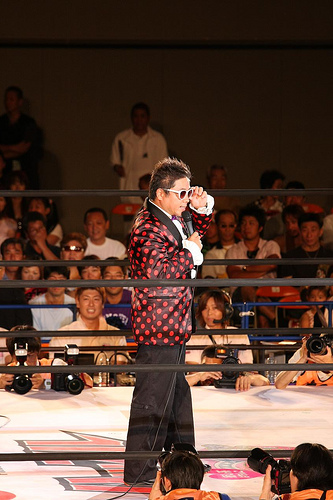
- Shimada in HUSTLE in 2008.
- Born: Yuji Shimada; November 24, 1966 (age 59)
- Occupations: MMA and professional wrestling referee

Yuji Shimada (島田 裕二, Shimada Yūji; born November 24, 1966 in Fukuyama, Hiroshima) is a Japanese mixed martial arts and professional wrestling referee, as well as professional wrestling booker, authority figure and occasional wrestler. He has refereed more than 1,000 contests in major MMA promotions including Pride Fighting Championships, Strikeforce, One, M-1 Global, Dream, Deep, Super Fight League and Rizin Fighting Federation. He was formerly the head referee and head of the rules committee for Icon Sport.

== Biography ==
He started his career in combat sports when he moved to United States to learn catch wrestling after graduating from Toyo University. Shimada trained under Masami Soranaka, Karl Gotch's student and son-in-law, who also taught him the job of refereeing. After returning to Japan, he started his referee career for Soranaka's promotion Pro Wrestling Fujiwara Gumi, moving to Battlarts after its demise. Around this time, he also worked for K-1, Fighting Network Rings and All Japan Pro Wrestling.

With the establishing of Pride in 1997, Shimada became its main referee. He became known for his personal style, which included gesticulating and yelling his orders, demanding aggression from the fighters at all times (usually by giving the command "Action!"), and asking insistently "give up?" every time one of them attempted a submission move. He was booed in every introduction, although reasons were unclear but likely due to him playing villainous characters in Japanese professional wrestling.

== Professional wrestling career ==
=== Hustle (2004-2008) ===
Shimada appeared in professional wrestling promotion Hustle from its starting in 2004. Playing a villainous character, he was introduced as a staff officer and spokesperson for the heel faction Takada Monster Army. He often appeared along with Commander An Jo and Generalissimo Takada, who typically ordered him to make plans against the heroic faction Hustle Army. After many failures, Shimada was demoted to private in February 2005. During this period, in order to save himself from dishonor, he claimed not to be Shimada himself, but a relative of his named Yuzo Shimada. He got to be chosen as Hustle's general manager in September 2008, passing his role as a soldier to Private Shoji, but he left the promotion in storyline due to a loss against Genichiro Tenryu in a special match. Shimada stopped working for Hustle shortly after.

== Filmography ==
| Year | Title | Role | Notes |
|---|---|---|---|
| 2005 | Nagurimono | Himself | |
