= 2009 in King of the Cage =

Mixed martial arts events

Information
- First date: January 17, 2009
- Last date: December 17, 2009

Events
- Total events: 37

Fights
- Total fights: 450
- Title fights: 21

Chronology
2008 in KOTC	2009 in King of the Cage	2010 in KOTC

The year 2009 is the 11th year in the history of King of the Cage, a mixed martial arts promotion based in the United States. In 2009 King of the Cage held 37 events, KOTC: Fusion.

== Title fights ==
Title fights in 2009
Weight class				Method	Round	Time	Event	Notes
Junior Welterweight	Victor Valenzuela (c)	def.	Donald Sanchez	Decision (Unanimous)	5	5:00	KOTC: Immortal	(Note: For the King of the Cage Junior Welterweight Championship.)
Light Heavyweight	Tony Lopez (c)	def.	Keith Berry	TKO (Punches)	3	4:29	KOTC: Immortal	(Note: For the King of the Cage Light Heavyweight Championship.)
Super Heavyweight	Neil Cooke	def.	Chance Williams (c)	TKO (Punches)	1	2:21	KOTC: Immortal	(Note: For the King of the Cage Super Heavyweight Championship.)
Bantamweight	Angelo Sanchez (c)	def.	Nathan Torrez	Submission (Armbar)	1	3:58	KOTC: New Breed	(Note: For the King of the Cage Bantamweight Championship.)
Light Heavyweight	Tony Lopez (c)	def.	Fernando Gonzalez	Submission (Rear-Naked Choke)	5	1:48	KOTC: Storm	(Note: For the King of the Cage Light Heavyweight Championship.)
Bantamweight	Angelo Sanchez (c)	def.	Donald Sanchez	Decision (Split)	5	5:00	KOTC: Retribution II	(Note: For the King of the Cage Bantamweight Championship.)
Junior Welterweight	Victor Valenzuela (c)	def.	Gabe Rivas	TKO (Punches)	1	3:23	KOTC: Legends	(Note: For the King of the Cage Junior Welterweight Championship.)
Light Heavyweight	Tony Lopez (c)	def.	Chad Herrick	KO (Head Kick)	5	0:19	KOTC: Encore	(Note: For the King of the Cage Light Heavyweight Championship.)
Middleweight	Brad Burrick	def.	Brandon Hunt (c)	Decision (Unanimous)	5	5:00	KOTC: Encore	(Note: For The King of the Cage Middleweight Championship.)
Flyweight	Abel Cullum (c)	def.	Richard Montano	Decision (Unanimous)	5	5:00	KOTC: Gate Keeper	(Note: For the King of the Cage Flyweight Championship.)
Bantamweight	Donald Sanchez	def.	Lazar Stojadinovic	Decision (Unanimous)	5	5:00	KOTC: Gate Keeper	(Note: For the King of the Cage Bantamweight Championship.)
Lightweight	Tony Hervey	def.	Victor Valenzuela	TKO (Doctor Stoppage)	2	1:32	KOTC: Super Stars	(Note: For the King of the Cage Lightweight Championship.)
Light Heavyweight	Tony Lopez (c)	def.	Dave Cryer	Decision (Unanimous)	5	5:00	KOTC: Super Stars	(Note: For the King of the Cage Light Heavyweight Championship.)
Super Heavyweight	Neil Cooke (c)	def.	Sal Farnetti	Submission (Rear-Naked Choke)	1	1:57	KOTC: Super Stars	(Note: For the King of the Cage Super Heavyweight Championship.)
Heavyweight	Tony Lopez (c)	def.	Joey Beltran	Decision (Unanimous)	5	5:00	KOTC: Distorted	(Note: For the King of the Cage Heavyweight Championship.)
Welterweight	Michael Guymon (c)	def.	Quinn Mulhern	Submission (Punch)	4	4:32	KOTC: Distorted	(Note: For the King of the Cage Welterweight Championship.)
Junior Welterweight	Ricky Legere Jr.	def.	Waachiim Spiritwolf	TKO (Punches)	2	2:25	KOTC: Distorted	(Note: For the King of the Cage Junior Welterweight Championship.)
Bantamweight	Donald Sanchez (c)	def.	Richard Montano	Decision (Unanimous)	5	5:00	KOTC: Horse Power	(Note: For the King of the Cage Bantamweight Championship.)
Lightweight	David Shepherd	def.	Tony Hervey (c)	Submission (Rear-Naked Choke)	1	4:19	KOTC: Title Defense	(Note: For the King of the Cage Lightweight Championship.)
Heavyweight	Tony Lopez (c)	def.	Tyler East	Decision (Split)	5	5:00	KOTC: Fight 4 Hope	(Note: For the King of the Cage Heavyweight Championship.)
Junior Welterweight	Ricky Legere Jr. (c)	def.	Eric Moon	Submission (Armbar)	1	3:04	KOTC: Fight 4 Hope	(Note: For the King of the Cage Junior Welterweight Championship.)

== Events list ==
#	Event Title	Date	Arena	Location
171	KOTC: Fight 4 Hope	December 17, 2009	San Manuel Casino	Highland, California
170	KOTC: Title Defense	December 12, 2009	Kewadin Casino	Sault Ste. Marie, Michigan
169	KOTC: Horse Power	November 28, 2009	Inn of the Mountain Gods Resort and Casino	Mescalero, New Mexico
168	KOTC: Wreckage	October 30, 2009	Lucky Star Casino	Clinton, Oklahoma
167	KOTC: Rip Tide	October 10, 2009	Quinault Beach Resort and Casino	Ocean Shores, Washington
166	KOTC: Strike Point	October 10, 2009	Lake of the Torches Casino	Lac du Flambeau, Wisconsin
165	KOTC: Jolted	October 3, 2009	Avi Resort and Casino	Laughlin, Nevada
164	KOTC: Distorted	October 1, 2009	San Manuel Casino	Highland, California
163	KOTC: Forged Steel	September 26, 2009	Ute Mountain Casino	Cortez, Colorado
162	KOTC: Turmoil	September 5, 2009	Northern Lights Casino	Walker, Minnesota
161	KOTC: Eruption	August 29, 2009	Leelanau Sands Casino	Peshawbestown, Michigan
160	KOTC: Thunderstruck	August 15, 2009	Comcast Arena	Everett, Washington
159	KOTC: Super Stars	August 13, 2009	San Manuel Casino	Highland, California
158	KOTC: Gunslinger	August 8, 2009	Lucky Star Casino	Concho, Oklahoma
157	KOTC: Gate Keeper	August 1, 2009	Inn of the Mountain Gods Resort and Casino	Mescalero, New Mexico
156	KOTC: Disputed	July 25, 2009	Kewadin Casino	Sault Ste. Marie, Michigan
155	KOTC: Connection	July 18, 2009	Lake of the Torches Casino	Lac du Flambeau, Wisconsin
154	KOTC: The Renewal	June 20, 2009	Tyndall Armory	Indianapolis, Indiana
153	KOTC: Encore	June 19, 2009	Soaring Eagle Casino	Mount Pleasant, Michigan
152	KOTC: Militia	June 11, 2009	San Manuel Casino	San Bernardino, California
151	KOTC: Legends	June 6, 2009	Quechan Casino	Winterhaven, California
150	KOTC: Retribution II	May 30, 2009	Inn of the Mountain Gods Resort and Casino	Mescalero, New Mexico
149	KOTC: El Lobo	May 23, 2009	Ute Mountain Casino	Towaoc, Colorado
148	KOTC: Storm	May 16, 2009	Diamond Stadium	Lake Elsinore, California
147	KOTC: Battle on the Bay	April 18, 2009	Leelanau Sands Casino	Peshawbestown, Michigan
146	KOTC: Insanity	April 4, 2009	Lake of the Torches Casino	Lac du Flambeau, Wisconsin
145	KOTC: Invincible	March 27, 2009	Georgia International Convention Center	Atlanta, Georgia
144	KOTC: Border Wars	March 21, 2009	MBT Expo Center	Monroe, Michigan
143	KOTC: Dividing Lines	March 14, 2009	Kewadin Casino	Sault Ste. Marie, Michigan
142	KOTC: Last Resort	March 14, 2009	Avi Resort and Casino	Laughlin, Nevada
141	KOTC: New Breed	March 7, 2009	Inn of the Mountain Gods Resort and Casino	Mescalero, New Mexico
140	KOTC: Rapture	February 28, 2009	Ute Mountain Casino	Towaoc, Colorado
139	KOTC: Northern Lights	February 28, 2009	Northern Lights Casino	Walker, Minnesota
138	KOTC: Immortal	February 26, 2009	San Manuel Casino	Highland, California
137	KOTC: Hurricane	February 21, 2009	War Memorial Auditorium	Fort Lauderdale, Florida
136	KOTC: Impulse	January 17, 2009	Chevrolet Centre	Youngstown, Ohio
135	KOTC: Fusion	January 17, 2009	Soaring Eagle Casino	Mount Pleasant, Michigan

== KOTC: Fusion ==
KOTC: Fusion was an event held on January 17, 2009, at the Soaring Eagle Casino in Mount Pleasant, Michigan.

=== Results ===
Main Card
Weight class				Method	Round	Time	Notes
	Lyle Beerbohm	def.	Jorge Sarat	TKO (Punches)	2	3:48
	Tony Hervey	def.	Mike Roberts	TKO (Punches)	2	1:19
	Ben Lagman	def.	Nick Verrett	Submission (Kimura)	1	1:09
	Angelo Popofski	def.	Joshua Taibl	Submission (Rear-Naked Choke)	1	0:45
	Jay Freeman	def.	Terry Davinney	TKO (Punches)	1	0:18
	Scott Bickerstaff	def.	Mark Lichti	Submission (Punches)	1	1:48
	Nick Bismack	def.	Cody Camp	Submission (Leg Scissor Choke)	2	1:52
	Nick Gaston	def.	Troy Fox	TKO (Doctor Stoppage)	1	3:00
	David Newport	def.	Mike Sommer	TKO (Punches)	1	1:36
	John Durran	def.	Justin Naylor	Submission (Rear-Naked Choke)	2	0:21
	Robert Richardson	def.	Calem Willis	Submission (Punches)	1	1:50

== KOTC: Impulse ==
KOTC: Impulse was an event held on January 17, 2009, at the Chevrolet Centre in Youngstown, Ohio.

=== Results ===
Main Card
Weight class				Method	Round	Time	Notes
	Mitch Whitesel	def.	Micah Bender	Submission (Guillotine Choke)	1	1:26
	Brandon Ezzo	def.	John Fields	Submission (Triangle Choke)	1	2:24
	Victor O'Donnell	def.	Jim Bundy	Submission (Armbar)	1	1:15
	Chad Riedmiller	def.	Tony Abbate	Submission (Guillotine Choke)	1	0:39
	Mike Bogner	vs.	Curtis Hall	No Contest	1	0:00
	T.J. Finley	def.	Braden Bice	Submission (Kimura)	1	0:33
	Marcos Pecina	def.	Louis Armezzani	Submission (Triangle Choke)	1	2:48
	Frank Armstrong	def.	Mike Fair	Decision (Unanimous)	3	3:00
	Jacob Liss	def.	Mike Wiseman	KO	1	1:38
	Thad Benton	def.	Ben Grove	Submission (Rear-Naked Choke)	2	2:03
	Chris Curtis	def.	Michael Cardona	Decision (Unanimous)	3	3:00
	Kyle Dolan	def.	Jordan Albright	KO (Punches)	1	0:05
	Corey Bice	def.	Mike Passio	TKO (Punches)	1	0:57
	Charles Sosbe	def.	Dan Jones	Decision (Unanimous)	3	3:00
	Mark Wiant	def.	Oliver Vickers	Submission (Armbar)	2	1:31
	Frank Shultz	def.	Ben Drew Parks	Submission (Anaconda Choke)	2	1:21

== KOTC: Hurricane ==
KOTC: Hurricane was an event held on February 21, 2009, at War Memorial Auditorium in Fort Lauderdale, Florida.

=== Results ===
Main Card
Weight class				Method	Round	Time	Notes
	Crafton Wallace	def.	Todd Carney	Submission (Rear-Naked Choke)	1	2:04
	Rich Attonito	def.	Uber Gallegos	Submission (Arm-Triangle Choke)	1	3:31
	Alex Caceres	def.	Eric Kovarik	Submission (Rear-Naked Choke)	1	1:58
	Nico Parella	def.	Bounmy Somchay	Submission (Rear-Naked Choke)	1	2:19
	Jarod Lawton	def.	Lindon Mitchell	Submission (Triangle Choke)	1	1:10
	Ketema Jahmal McLennan	def.	Doug Rossi	Submission (Triangle Choke)	1	1:32
	Tony Leone	def.	Jason Jimenez	Submission (Guillotine Choke)	2	1:39
	Mackenzie Briggs	def.	Brann Redl	Submission (Guillotine Choke)	1	3:03
	Hayder Hassan	def.	Kenny Allen	TKO (Punches)	1	0:09
	Edvan Barros	def.	Ryan Buhl	TKO (Punches)	3	4:54

== KOTC: Immortal ==
KOTC: Immortal was an event held on February 26, 2009, at San Manuel Casino in Highland, California.

=== Results ===
Main Card
Weight class				Method	Round	Time	Notes
Junior Welterweight	Victor Valenzuela (c)	def.	Donald Sanchez	Decision (Unanimous)	5	5:00	(Note: For the King of the Cage Junior Welterweight Championship.)
Light Heavyweight	Tony Lopez (c)	def.	Keith Berry	TKO (Punches)	3	4:29	(Note: For the King of the Cage Light Heavyweight Championship.)
	Travis Browne	def.	Michael Westbrook	TKO (Punches)	3	1:22
Super Heavyweight	Neil Cooke	def.	Chance Williams (c)	TKO (Punches)	1	2:21	(Note: For the King of the Cage Super Heavyweight Championship.)
	Roberto Vargas	def.	Aaron Miller	Submission (Guillotine Choke)	1	0:28
	Dave Cryer	def.	Lucas Taber	Decision (Unanimous)	3	5:00
	Bobby Green	def.	John Ulloa	Submission (Armbar)	1	0:00
	David Vessup	def.	Josh Ilui	Submission (Rear-Naked Choke)	1	0:30

== KOTC: Northern Lights ==
KOTC: Northern Lights was an event held on February 29, 2009, at Northern Lights Casino in Walker, Minnesota.

=== Results ===
Main Card
Weight class				Method	Round	Time	Notes
	Caleb Nelson	def.	Travis Mccullough	Submission (Armbar)	1	2:26
	Jesse Barbot	def.	Adam Johnson	TKO (Punches)	1	0:40
	Andrew Johnson	def.	Jonathan Fairbanks	TKO (Punches)	1	1:05
	Chuck Humphrey	def.	Jay Grave	Submission (Punches)	1	0:30
	Tammy Piper	def.	Kelly Warren	TKO (Punches)	1	0:49
	Dean Lamb	def.	Nick Klubben	Submission (Guillotine Choke)	1	2:28
	Braden Bice	def.	John Gonzales	Submission (Armbar)	1	1:32
	Roger Hartwell	def.	Shawn Ringeisen	KO (Punches)	2	0:46
	Robert Olson	def.	Alex Piper	TKO (Retirement)	2	3:00
	Reese Hernandez	def.	Dante Harris	TKO (Punches)	1	1:05
	Buffi Hayes	def.	Amy Hrzic	TKO (Punches)	1	2:40

== KOTC: Rapture ==
KOTC: Rapture was an event held on February 28, 2009, at Ute Mountain Casino in Towaoc, Colorado.

=== Results ===
Main Card
Weight class				Method	Round	Time	Notes
	Levi Stout	def.	Adam Madrid	Submission (Rear-Naked Choke)	1	2:53
	Jason Keith	def.	Derique Duran	Submission (Arm-Triangle Choke)	1	3:26
	Jacob Clark	def.	James Mead	Submission (Armbar)	1	1:43
	Isaque Martinez	def.	Jacob Cottrell	TKO (Punches)	1	2:19
	Tim Means	def.	Brad Nordquist	KO (Punches)	1	2:07
	Jerome Griego	def.	Gabe Francis	TKO (Punches)	2	2:04
	Cris Leyva	def.	Abross Tsyatwho	Submission (Punches)	1	2:58
	Darrell Euler	def.	Travis Hansen	TKO (Retirement)	2	0:00
	Sidiah Parker	def.	Reggie Candelaria	Decision (Unanimous)	3	3:00
	John Paul Gallegos	def.	Byron Hacket	Submission (Armbar)	2	0:56
	Martine Gonzales	def.	Chris Nelson	TKO (Punches)	1	2:29
	Paul Ray	def.	Gabe Gallegos	Submission (Anaconda Choke)	1	0:22
	Carlos Henri	def.	Daniel Gonzales	KO (Knee)	1	0:03
	Jessie Williamson	def.	Jayson Bedker	Submission (Punches)	1	1:54
	Matt Goff	def.	Sooksan Simpleman	TKO (Retirement)	2	0:00
	Michael Hovenstein	def.	Michael Armendariz	Decision (Split)	3	3:00

== KOTC: New Breed ==
KOTC: New Breed was an event held on March 7, 2009, at the Inn of the Mountain Gods Resort and Casino in Mescalero, New Mexico.

=== Results ===
Main Card
Weight class				Method	Round	Time	Notes
	Coty Wheeler	def.	Jasper Church	TKO (Punches)	1	0:28
Bantamweight	Angelo Sanchez (c)	def.	Nathan Torrez	Submission (Armbar)	1	3:58	(Note: For the King of the Cage Bantamweight Championship.)
	Quinn Mulhern	def.	Ricky Legere Jr.	Submission (Triangle Choke)	2	2:52
	Tim Means	def.	Matt Green	TKO (Punches)	1	0:09
	Andreas Mercado	def.	Art Mesa	Submission (Rear-Naked Choke)	2	0:43
	John Strong	vs.	Levi Price	NC	0	0:00
	Frank Baca	def.	Duane Geckler	TKO (Punches)	1	1:34
	Isaiah Reyes	def.	Nick McCurdy	Submission (Armbar)	1	0:51
	Mike Orchowski	def.	Eric Polaco	Submission (Shoulder Choke)	2	0:27
	Levi Green	def.	Brian Chavez	TKO (Punches)	1	0:43
	Onecimo Mirabal	def.	Andre Black	Submission (Punches)	2	1:55
	Desmond Walker	def.	James Hazel	Submission (Rear-Naked Choke)	2	2:59
	Josh Burns	def.	Matt Goff	Submission (Triangle Choke)	2	1:22

== KOTC: Last Resort ==
KOTC: Last Resort was an event held on March 14, 2009, at the Avi Resort and Casino in Laughlin, Nevada.

=== Results ===
Main Card
Weight class				Method	Round	Time	Notes
	Wes Combs	def.	Jason Weiss	TKO (Punches)	2	0:48
	Junior Kling	def.	Matt Muramoto	TKO (Retirement)	2	3:00
	Nick Woods	def.	Ernie Calma	TKO (Punches)	1	0:50
	Jason Trevino	def.	Travis LeBurn	Decision (Unanimous)	3	3:00
	Greg Guzman	def.	Garrett Ludwig	Submission (Triangle Choke)	1	0:46
	Jason Lane	def.	Jason Squyer	TKO (Punches)	1	0:11
	Joe Kling	def.	Peter Dominguez	Submission (Armbar)	2	2:59
	Ramon Fajardo	def.	Jeff Torch	Submission (Rear-Naked Choke)	1	1:38
	Danny Davis Jr.	def.	Matt Harvey	TKO (Punches)	1	0:27
	Rich Campbell	def.	Zach Matthews	Submission (Armbar)	1	1:31
	Sean Strickland	def.	Brandon Ellsworth	TKO (Punches)	1	1:28
	George Wright	def.	Scott Royer	TKO (Punches)	2	2:00

== KOTC: Dividing Lines ==
KOTC: Dividing Lines was an event held on March 14, 2009, at the Kewadin Casino in Sault Ste. Marie, Michigan.

=== Results ===
Main Card
Weight class				Method	Round	Time	Notes
	Don Richards	def.	Jonathan Spears	KO	1	0:55
	Cody Camp	def.	Brent Fryia	Submission (Guillotine Choke)	1	2:40
	Joe Galer	def.	William Carpenter	Submission (Armbar)	1	0:24
	Brett Sbardella	def.	Mark Lichti	Submission (Punches)	1	1:54
	Bruce Spencer	def.	Darryl Daoust	KO (Punches)	1	1:11
	Owen Martin	def.	Bruce Spencer	TKO (Corner Stoppage)	2	2:21
	Dyllan Ford	def.	Ray Gowlet	Submission (Triangle Choke)	1	1:02
	Luc Nadeau	def.	Loren Hins	Submission (Punches)	1	1:01
	Jeremy Gagnon	def.	Anthony Ciotti	Submission (Guillotine Choke)	1	1:22
	Nate Cremains	def.	Bruce Spencer	Submission (Triangle Choke)	3	1:27
	Josten Tardif	def.	Jeff Ferrell	Submission (Armbar)	1	1:59
	Rob Mcrorie	def.	Travis Machlamore	Submission (Armbar)	1	0:37
	Aaron Haney	def.	Travis Gardner	TKO (Punches)	2	0:34
	Luis Cote	def.	Scott Spears	Submission (Guillotine Choke)	1	0:34
	Buckshot Gravelle	def.	PJ Roe	Submission (Guillotine Choke)	2	1:45

== KOTC: Border Wars ==
KOTC: Border Wars was an event held on March 21, 2009, at the MBT Expo Center in Monroe, Michigan.

=== Results ===
Main Card
Weight class				Method	Round	Time	Notes
	Brandon Hance	def.	Gabe Brooks	Submission (Rear-Naked Choke)	1	1:13
	Drew Morais	def.	Brian Smiley	TKO (Punches)	1	2:27
	Josh Johnson	def.	Clayton Burch	Submission (Armbar)	1	2:35
	George Keting	def.	Matt Austin	Submission (Achilles Lock)	1	2:52
	Antonio Castillo Jr.	def.	Christopher Moore	Submission (Armbar)	3	1:49
	Corey O'Dell	def.	Jacob Liss	Decision (Unanimous)	3	3:00
	Dan Truax	def.	Chauncey Alcorn	Submission (Arm-Triangle Choke)	1	2:30
	Ray Hernandez	def.	Brad Brettsnider	TKO (Punches)	1	2:42
	Henry Douglas	def.	Craig Hogan	Decision (Unanimous)	3	3:00
	Rick Day	def.	Dante Harris	TKO (Punches)	1	1:53
	Dave Corbin	def.	Derek Mittendorf	Decision (Unanimous)	3	3:00
	Charles Sosbe	def.	Nate Brow	Submission (Guillotine Choke)	1	2:58

== KOTC: Invincible ==
KOTC: Invincible was an event held on March 27, 2009, at the Georgia International Convention Center in Atlanta, Georgia.

=== Results ===
Main Card
Weight class				Method	Round	Time	Notes
	Charles Blanchard	def.	Douglas Lima	Decision (Unanimous)	3	5:00
	Junior Assuncao	def.	Kamrin Naville	Decision (Unanimous)	3	5:00
	George Allen	def.	Bryan Pardoe	TKO (Punches)	1	3:11
	Jeremy Germenis	def.	Anthony Nieves	Submission (Rear-Naked Choke)	1	2:21
	Cale Yarbrough	def.	Justin Hall	KO (Punches)	2	1:14
	John Salter	def.	Patrick Mandio	Submission (Armbar)	1	4:35
	Nathan Gaylord	def.	Dickie Wilson	Decision (Unanimous)	3	3:00
	Lance Evans	def.	David Pope	Decision (Unanimous)	3	3:00
	Josh Ward	def.	Andre Camarena-Allen	Submission (Rear-Naked Choke)	2	2:45
	Jeremy Wright	def.	Dare Shorunke	Submission (Rear-Naked Choke)	1	2:55
	Greg Lawrence	def.	Corey Smith	Submission (Shoulder Crank)	1	1:00
	William Kuhn	def.	Jeremy Neal	TKO (Punches)	1	1:32
	Jacob DeLarosa	def.	James Robinson	Submission (Kimura)	1	1:40
	Chris Ruiz	def.	Tony Crook	Submission (Kimura)	3	1:56

== KOTC: Insanity ==
KOTC: Insanity was an event held on April 4, 2009, at Lake of the Torches Casino in Lac du Flambeau, Wisconsin.

=== Results ===
Main Card
Weight class				Method	Round	Time	Notes
	Sam Alvey	def.	Jason Sink	TKO (Punches)	1	1:10
	Jon Friedland	def.	Ernie Paulson	Submission (Scissor Choke)	1	2:06
	Myles Jury	def.	Karl Kelly	Submission (Punches)	1	0:20
	Adam Kope	def.	Joel Wortner	TKO (Punches)	1	2:37
	Mike Meyers	def.	John Gonzales	TKO (Punches)	1	2:30
	Will Dicke	def.	Alex Lundgren	TKO (Punches)	1	2:06
	Jason Mills	def.	Jon Kertz	Submission (Rear-Naked Choke)	1	1:17
	Joe Krus	def.	Josh Greetan	Submission (Triangle Choke)	1	2:00
	Shane Cadotte	def.	Dylan Copeskey	Submission (Guillotine Choke)	1	0:34
	Tom Ahlborn	def.	Pete Vargo	Submission (Guillotine Choke)	1	1:34
	Jimmy Zidek	def.	Dave Hipke	Decision (Unanimous)	3	3:00
	Dave Parker	def.	Travis Larson	TKO (Punches)	1	2:21
	Ryan White	def.	Dustin Johnson	TKO (Punches)	1	1:18
	Jon Barker	def.	Mitch Tiesman	TKO (Punches)	1	2:56

== KOTC: Battle on the Bay ==
KOTC: Battle on the Bay was an event held on April 18, 2009, at Leelanau Sands Casino in Peshawbestown, Michigan.

=== Results ===
Main Card
Weight class				Method	Round	Time	Notes
	Chad Herrick	def.	Nick Verrett	TKO (Punches)	1	0:51
	Andy Hahn	def.	Tyrone Holmes	TKO (Punches)	1	1:50
	Joe Galer	def.	Jonathan Spears	KO (Punches)	1	0:09
	Josh Johnson	def.	Lance Snow	TKO (Punches)	1	1:48
	David Harris	def.	Eric Myas	TKO (Punches)	1	1:51
	Jason Pleak	def.	Josh Boyer	TKO (Retirement)	2	3:00
	Andy Sakic	def.	Bill Stauffer	KO (Punches)	1	0:13
	Brandon Hance	def.	Jacob Ott	Submission (Guillotine Choke)	1	0:53
	Mike Opper	def.	Unknown Fighter	Submission (Rear-Naked Choke)	1	0:29
	Mike Holmes	def.	Aaron Haney	Submission (Rear-Naked Choke)	2	2:24

== KOTC: Storm ==
KOTC: Storm was an event held on May 16, 2009, at Diamond Stadium in Lake Elsinore, California.

=== Results ===
Main Card
Weight class				Method	Round	Time	Notes
Light Heavyweight	Tony Lopez (c)	def.	Fernando Gonzalez	Submission (Rear-Naked Choke)	5	1:48	(Note: For the King of the Cage Light Heavyweight Championship.)
	Ricky Legere Jr.	def.	Erik Meaders	KO (Punches)	1	2:20
	Joe Crilly	def.	Ruben Tagle	KO (Punches)	1	0:11
	Dave Cryer	def.	Paul Karsky	TKO (Punches)	1	4:17
	Aaron Miller	def.	Junior Kling	Decision (Unanimous)	3	5:00
	Thomas Casarez	def.	Javi Alanis	Submission (Armbar)	1	0:51
	Greg Guzman	def.	Federico Lopez	Decision (Unanimous)	3	3:00
	Marcos Gonzalez	def.	Niko Medina	Decision (Unanimous)	3	3:00
	Victor Rodarte	def.	Bryan Colebrook	Decision (Unanimous)	3	3:00

== KOTC: El Lobo ==
KOTC: El Lobo was an event held on May 23, 2009, at Ute Mountain Casino in Towaoc, Colorado.

=== Results ===
Main Card
Weight class				Method	Round	Time	Notes
	Levi Stout	def.	Sidiah Parker	Submission (Rear-Naked Choke)	2	2:33
	Isaque Martinez	def.	Andre Black	Submission (Rear-Naked Choke)	1	4:19
	Richard Montano	def.	Jacob Clark	Decision (Unanimous)	3	5:00
	Daniel Armendariz	def.	Lorenzo Coca	KO (Elbows)	2	2:17
	Cris Leyva	def.	Nathan Randall	TKO (Retirement)	1	5:00
	Tim Means	def.	Matt Butterfield	KO (Knee)	1	0:04
	Elsie Zwicker	def.	Loren Ortiz	Decision (Split)	3	5:00
	Ricardo Juan McCall	def.	Shalako Powers	TKO (Punches)	1	0:18
	Joey Lujan	def.	Josh Lanier	TKO (Retirement)	1	5:00
	Liron Wilson	def.	Jayson Bedker	Submission (Armbar)	1	1:09
	Hector Saillant	def.	Curtis Johnson	Decision (Unanimous)	3	5:00
	Matt Goff	def.	Bruce Harris	Submission (Armbar)	1	1:41
	Anthony Werner	def.	George Roybal	Submission (Triangle Choke)	1	2:35
	Efrin Solis	def.	Richard Killingbeck	Submission (Punches)	3	1:05
	Marcie Walker	def.	Jessica Gonzalez	Decision (Split)	3	5:00
	James Hazel	def.	Dominic Contreras	Submission (Punches)	1	2:12
	Randy Sandoval	def.	Andrew Jaramillo	Submission (Punches)	1	1:32
	Eugene Rodriguez	def.	Lucas Wells	TKO (Punches)	1	1:21

== KOTC: Retribution II ==
KOTC: Retribution II was an event held on May 30, 2009, at the Inn of the Mountain Gods Resort and Casino in Mescalero, New Mexico.

=== Results ===
Main Card
Weight class				Method	Round	Time	Notes
Bantamweight	Angelo Sanchez (c)	def.	Donald Sanchez	Decision (Split)	5	5:00	(Note: For the King of the Cage Bantamweight Championship.)
	Andreas Mercado	def.	Donnie Martinez	Decision (Split)	3	5:00
	Monica Lovato	def.	Melissa Vasquez	TKO (Retirement)	1	5:00
	Brad Nordquist	def.	Joey Avey	Submission (Punches)	1	0:38
	Gerald Lovato	def.	John Craycraft	TKO (Punches)	1	1:19
	Ulpiano Malachias	def.	David Davis	Submission (Armbar)	1	0:42
	Richard Montano	def.	J.R. Sotelo	Decision (Unanimous)	3	3:00
	Levi Price	def.	Bruce Conat	Submission (Armbar)	1	2:21
	Jesus Rubio	def.	Isaac Olmos	TKO (Punches)	1	1:19
	Eric Garcia	def.	Eric Polaco	Submission (Guillotine Choke)	1	2:06
	Mario Pulido	def.	Chris Gladman	Submission (Rear-Naked Choke)	1	1:27
	Jesus Lopez	def.	Alex Polaco	Submission (Rear-Naked Choke)	3	2:53
	Brian Chavez	def.	Denton Comyford	Submission (Rear-Naked Choke)	1	0:47
	Marcel Cloud	def.	Darian Allen	Submission (Rear-Naked Choke)	1	2:09
	Eddie Deluca	def.	Emil Dubine	Submission (Neck Crank)	1	0:13

== KOTC: Legends ==
KOTC: Legends was an event held on June 6, 2009, at Quechan Casino in Winterhaven, California.

=== Results ===
Main Card
Weight class				Method	Round	Time	Notes
Junior Welterweight	Victor Valenzuela (c)	def.	Gabe Rivas	TKO (Punches)	1	3:23	(Note: For the King of the Cage Junior Welterweight Championship.)
	Anthony McDavitt	def.	Charles Bennett	Decision (Split)	3	5:00
	Joey Beltran	def.	Wes Combs	TKO (Punches)	1	0:25
	Joey Rivera	def.	Shannon Ritch	Submission (Injury)	1	1:17
	Scotty Merrit	def.	Ryan Miller	Submission (Punches)	1	2:03
	Andy Murad	def.	Mike Lemaire	Decision (Unanimous)	3	5:00
	Rob Jankowski	def.	Garrett Ludwig	Submission (Rear-Naked Choke)	1	1:07
	Justin Berryhill	def.	Nick Woods	Submission (Rear-Naked Choke)	1	1:06
	Roscoe Jackson	def.	Anthony Rowland	Submission (Rear-Naked Choke)	2	2:01
	Dan Hark	def.	Greg Contrado	TKO (Punches)	3	1:06
	Cale Errigo	def.	Chris Shnyder	Submission (Guillotine Choke)	2	0:44

== KOTC: Militia ==
KOTC: Militia was an event held on June 11, 2009, at San Manuel Casino in San Bernardino, California.

=== Results ===
Main Card
Weight class				Method	Round	Time	Notes
	Quinn Mulhern	def.	Chris Brennan	Submission (Omoplata)	1	2:01
	Tony Hervey	def.	Alberto Crane	KO (Punches)	1	0:12
	Michael Guymon	def.	Kyacey Uscola	TKO (Punches)	2	1:12
	Ricky Legere Jr.	def.	Mike Robles	TKO (Punches)	3	2:12
	David Vessup	def.	Uber Gallegos	Decision (Split)	3	3:00
	Corey Grant	def.	Charles Evan Thompson	Decision (Unanimous)	3	3:00
	Jose Morales	def.	John Sassone	Decision (Unanimous)	3	3:00
	Joe Lewis	def.	George Sanchez	Decision (Split)	3	3:00
	Armando Montoya Jr.	def.	Estephan Jiminez	Submission (Guillotine Choke)	2	1:23

== KOTC: Encore ==
KOTC: Encore was an event held on June 19, 2009, at Soaring Eagle Casino in Mount Pleasant, Michigan.

=== Results ===
Main Card
Weight class				Method	Round	Time	Notes
Light Heavyweight	Tony Lopez (c)	def.	Chad Herrick	KO (Head Kick)	5	0:19	(Note: For the King of the Cage Light Heavyweight Championship.)
Middleweight	Brad Burrick	def.	Brandon Hunt (c)	Decision (Unanimous)	5	5:00	(Note: For The King of the Cage Middleweight Championship.)
	Myles Jury	def.	Tyrone Holmes	TKO (Punches)	1	2:20
	Angelo Popofski	def.	Eddie Sanchez	Submission (Kimura)	1	2:50
	Ben Lagman	def.	Joshua Taibl	TKO (Punches)	1	1:46
	Cody Camp	def.	Eric Shellenbarger	TKO (Punches)	1	2:38
	William Penn	def.	Jason Fish	Submission (Punches)	1	0:55
	Caleb Grummet	def.	Joseph Beal	TKO (Punches)	1	0:40
	Eric Moon	def.	Dyllan Ford	TKO (Punches)	1	0:51
	Brandon Johnson	def.	William Knox	Submission (Arm-Triangle Choke)	1	1:34

== KOTC: The Renewal ==
KOTC: The Renewal was an event held on June 20, 2009, at Tyndall Armory in Indianapolis, Indiana.

=== Results ===
Main Card
Weight class				Method	Round	Time	Notes
	Johnny Rees	vs.	Steve Conley	No Contest	0	0:00
	Joe Kielur	def.	Michael Morrison	TKO (Punches)	1	0:33
	Shamar Bailey	def.	Rodney Sleepers	Decision (Unanimous)	3	3:00
	Justin Robbins	def.	Tom Osborne	TKO (Punches)	2	0:38
	Steve Cotterman	def.	Steve Yavo	Submission (Rear-Naked Choke)	3	2:58
	Kurt Kinser	def.	Daniel Head	Decision (Unanimous)	3	3:00
	Jeremy Carver	def.	Jack O'Neil	Submission (Punches)	1	0:08
	Tim Bradley	def.	Matt Wilson	Submission (Arm-Triangle Choke)	1	1:31
	Lloyd Carter	def.	Darnell Davis	Decision (Unanimous)	3	3:00
	J.D. Craft	def.	Morgan Regnier	TKO (Punches)	1	1:29
	Clay French	def.	Bryan Neville	Submission (Neck Crank)	1	0:28
	Jason Law	def.	Josh Donough	KO (Head Kick)	1	0:07
	John Manley	def.	Casey Large	Submission (Rear-Naked Choke)	1	0:33
	Marc Bennett	def.	James Blackburn	Decision (Unanimous)	3	3:00
	Robert Simpson	def.	Ryan Driver	Submission (Guillotine Choke)	2	1:19
	Garett Whiteley	def.	Chad Kelly	Decision (Unanimous)	3	3:00
	Shane Rece	def.	Jose Escobedo	Submission (Triangle Choke)	1	1:54

== KOTC: Connection ==
KOTC: Connection was an event held on July 18, 2009, at Lake of the Torches Casino in Lac du Flambeau, Wisconsin.

=== Results ===
Main Card
Weight class				Method	Round	Time	Notes
	Michael Westbrook	vs.	Nick Gaston	NC (Accidental Groin Strike)	1	1:04
	Sam Alvey	def.	Ron Carter	Decision (Unanimous)	3	3:00
	Dave Roberts	def.	Chris Skoglund	Submission (Rear-Naked Choke)	1	2:30
	Caleb Nelson	def.	Lukas Bowar	TKO (Slam)	2	0:39
	Ricky Stettner	def.	Ernie Paulson	Submission (Armbar)	1	1:27
	Torre Reams	def.	Ken Richards	Submission (Rear-Naked Choke)	1	1:34
	Eric Moon	def.	Kyle Kennedy	KO (Punches)	1	0:50
	Jon Barker	vs.	Rob Mondloch	Draw	3	3:00
	Dave Hipke	def.	Jimmy Zidek	Decision (Split)	3	3:00
	William Penn	def.	Mike Meyers	Submission (Guillotine Choke)	2	1:10
	Bryce Lee Jackson	def.	Ryan White	Decision (Unanimous)	3	3:00
	Matt Schaeffer	def.	Alex Lundgren	Submission (Kimura)	1	2:43
	Jason Gignac	def.	Shane Cadotte	Submission (Guillotine Choke)	2	2:28
	Adrian Pierson	def.	Andy Mitchell	Submission (Triangle Choke)	1	1:31
	Amanda Wilcoxen-Morgan	def.	Stephanie Schneider	Submission (Armbar)	1	1:09
	Adam Cope	def.	Ryan Wortner	Submission (Guillotine Choke)	1	1:20
	Moriel Charneski	def.	Katie Maki	Decision (Majority)	3	3:00
	Joe Krus	def.	Mark Gentry	TKO (Slam)	1	1:42

== KOTC: Disputed ==
KOTC: Disputed was an event held on July 25, 2009, at Kewadin Casino in Sault Ste. Marie, Michigan.

=== Results ===
Main Card
Weight class				Method	Round	Time	Notes
	Dan Severn	def.	Woody Young	Submission (Arm-Triangle Choke)	2	2:31
	Brent Fryia	def.	Derek O'Neil	Submission (Rear-Naked Choke)	1	1:23
	Brett Sbardella	def.	Ron Krull	Submission (Rear-Naked Choke)	1	0:56
	Todd Canter	def.	Solomon Blake	Submission (Punches)	2	1:12
	Jeff Elliot	def.	Owen Martin	TKO (Punches)	1	1:40
	Buckshot Gravelle	def.	PJ Roe	Submission (Armbar)	1	2:50
	Dan Claus	def.	Marcel Gibbs	Submission (Arm-Triangle Choke)	1	0:35
	Richard Wells	def.	Anthony Williams	Submission (Armbar)	1	1:29
	Joe Marcotti	def.	Nathan Cremens	Submission (Guillotine Choke)	1	1:15
	Adrian Vilic	def.	Joe Dupui	Submission (Triangle Choke)	1	1:46
	Trevor Manchester	def.	Joe Gravelle	TKO (Punches)	1	1:19
	Travis McCloud	def.	Rob McCrorie	TKO (Corner Stoppage)	1	2:10
	Robin Cook	def.	John Mclarmaore	Submission (Guillotine Choke)	2	1:09
	John Veltri	def.	Nate Case	KO (Punches)	3	0:18
	Kyle Esson	def.	Travis Gardner	KO (Punches)	1	0:31

== KOTC: Gate Keeper ==
KOTC: Gate Keeper was an event held on August 1, 2009, at the Inn of the Mountain Gods Resort and Casino in Mescalero, New Mexico.

=== Results ===
Main Card
Weight class				Method	Round	Time	Notes
Flyweight	Abel Cullum (c)	def.	Richard Montano	Decision (Unanimous)	5	5:00	(Note: For the King of the Cage Flyweight Championship.)
Bantamweight	Donald Sanchez	def.	Lazar Stojadinovic	Decision (Unanimous)	5	5:00	(Note: For the King of the Cage Bantamweight Championship.)
	Monica Lovato	def.	Elsie Zwicker	Submission (Rear-Naked Choke)	1	4:28
	Cody Fredrickson	def.	Brad Nordquist	Submission (Rear-Naked Choke)	1	2:05
	Andreas Mercado	def.	Keith Armijo	Submission (Rear-Naked Choke)	2	2:45
	Boban Simic	def.	Tyler East	Decision (Unanimous)	3	3:00
	Carlos Henri	def.	Matt Goff	KO (Knee)	1	2:26
	Joe Coca	def.	Joe Salazar	Submission (Punches)	1	0:31
	Levi Price	def.	Oscar Trejo	TKO (Punches)	1	2:24
	Javier Rubio	def.	Luke Frahm	Submission (Rear-Naked Choke)	1	0:41
	Pancho Montano	def.	Julian Flores	Decision (Unanimous)	3	3:00
	Jaime Carreras	def.	Brian Chavez	TKO (Punches)	2	2:06
	Saxon Gladwell	def.	Eric Polaco	TKO (Retirement)	1	3:00
	Justice Quintana	def.	Dave Monogye	TKO (Retirement)	1	3:00

== KOTC: Gunslinger ==
KOTC: Gunslinger was an event held on August 8, 2009, at Lucky Star Casino in Concho, Oklahoma.

=== Results ===
Main Card
Weight class				Method	Round	Time	Notes
	Bill Albrecht	def.	Ruben Zamarron	Submission (Triangle Choke)	2	2:18
	Thricia Poovey	def.	Amber Powell	Submission (Kimura)	1	4:11
	Tim Means	def.	Marcio Navarro	TKO (Punches)	1	3:53
	Brandon Gaines	def.	Cody Garlett	Submission (Armbar)	1	0:51
	Nathan Torrez	def.	Chris Barnes	TKO (Punches)	1	2:02
	Rico Cato	def.	Marvin Babe	TKO (Punches)	1	1:23
	Kody Powell	def.	Anthony Sessions	Decision (Majority)	3	3:00
	Jacob Johnson	def.	Jason Everhart	TKO (Punches)	1	0:46
	Tavares Collins	def.	Ryan Neese	TKO (Punches)	1	1:18
	Alan Smarr	def.	Eric Clowers	TKO (Punches)	1	0:58
	Edwin Coleman	def.	Mike Lemaire	Submission (Guillotine Choke)	1	2:09

== KOTC: Super Stars ==
KOTC: Super Stars was an event held on August 13, 2009, at San Manuel Casino in Highland, California.

=== Results ===
Main Card
Weight class				Method	Round	Time	Notes
Lightweight	Tony Hervey	def.	Victor Valenzuela	TKO (Doctor Stoppage)	2	1:32	(Note: For the King of the Cage Lightweight Championship.)
Light Heavyweight	Tony Lopez (c)	def.	Dave Cryer	Decision (Unanimous)	5	5:00	(Note: For the King of the Cage Light Heavyweight Championship.)
	Charles Bennett	def.	Eric Moon	KO (Punches)	1	3:32
Super Heavyweight	Neil Cooke (c)	def.	Sal Farnetti	Submission (Rear-Naked Choke)	1	1:57	(Note: For the King of the Cage Super Heavyweight Championship.)
	Reuben Duran	def.	Greg Guzman	Decision (Unanimous)	3	3:00
	Brian Abram	def.	Chris Culley	Submission (Rear-Naked Choke)	2	2:46
	Ulises Figueroa	def.	Mauro Brenes	Submission (Rear-Naked Choke)	1	2:17

== KOTC: Thunderstruck ==
KOTC: Thunderstruck was an event held on August 15, 2009, at Comcast Arena in Everett, Washington.

=== Results ===
Main Card
Weight class				Method	Round	Time	Notes
	Tim Boetsch	def.	Aaron Stark	Submission (Guillotine Choke)	2	1:18
	Caros Fodor	def.	Nick Meginness	Submission (Guillotine Choke)	1	1:50
	Tyson Jeffries	def.	Brad Nordquist	Submission (Arm-Triangle Choke)	1	1:00
	Demetrious Johnson	def.	Frankie Mendez	Submission (Rear-Naked Choke)	1	4:38
	Tyson Nam	def.	Zach Skinner	KO (Punches)	1	4:58
	Daniel Stewart	def.	Rob Gibbs	TKO (Punches)	1	3:08
	Jared Torgeson	def.	Cain Spalding	TKO (Punches)	1	2:38
	Nic Kuning	def.	Butch McGavran	KO (Head Kick)	1	0:08

== KOTC: Eruption ==
KOTC: Eruption was an event held on August 29, 2009, at Leelanau Sands Casino in Peshawbestown, Michigan.

=== Results ===
Main Card
Weight class				Method	Round	Time	Notes
	Patrick Harman	def.	Joe Galer	KO (Punches)	3	2:10
	David Harris	vs.	Mike Roberts	Draw	3	3:00
	Chris Franks	vs.	Dan Claus	Draw	3	3:00
	Charlie Cosins	def.	Mike Paul	TKO (Punches)	2	2:19
	Ronnie Carr	def.	Dave Harris	Submission (Guillotine Choke)	1	2:13
	James Carrow	def.	Clay Belka	Submission (Rear-Naked Choke)	1	1:52
	Justin Zeno	def.	Jake Endline	Submission (Armbar)	1	1:21
	Alan Russell	def.	Chris Gonzalez	Submission (Guillotine Choke)	1	1:42
	Brandon Pratt	def.	Adam Marshall	TKO (Punches)	1	0:45
	Clarence Spurlock	def.	Frank Sade	KO (Head Kick)	1	0:12
	Aaron Carr	def.	Joey Caudill	TKO (Punches)	2	1:23
	Joey Bankroft	def.	Nate Darnell	Submission (Rear-Naked Choke)	1	1:49

== KOTC: Turmoil ==
KOTC: Turmoil was an event held on September 5, 2009, at Northern Lights Casino in Walker, Minnesota.

=== Results ===
Main Card
Weight class				Method	Round	Time	Notes
	Kurt Atchison	def.	Sheldon Martin	Submission (Rear-Naked Choke)	1	2:26
	Andrew Johnson	def.	Jeremy Froemke	Submission (Punches)	1	1:48
	Torri Lester	def.	Corina Grimm	Submission (Rear-Naked Choke)	1	1:53
	Reese Hernandez	def.	Mike Bannister	Submission (Punches)	1	1:07
	R.T. Hicks	def.	Kyle Fletcher	Submission (Rear-Naked Choke)	1	1:12
	Carlos Pitino	def.	Billy Fisher	Submission (Armbar)	1	2:30
	Bryan Barberena	def.	Brandon Rossbach	Decision (Unanimous)	3	3:00
	Brohdy Avery	def.	Dusty Burford	Submission (Triangle Choke)	2	2:28
	Chase Kerber	def.	Matt Rhiger	KO (Punches)	1	2:48
	Storm Rahlf	def.	Alex Castrow	Submission (Armbar)	1	2:30
	Steve Moreno	def.	Adam Techau	Submission (Triangle Choke)	1	2:36
	Joe Pawlenty	def.	Eric Kagle	TKO (Punches)	2	1:45

== KOTC: Forged Steel ==
KOTC: Forged Steel was an event held on September 26, 2009, at Ute Mountain Casino in Cortez, Colorado.

=== Results ===
Main Card
Weight class				Method	Round	Time	Notes
	Jayson Bedker	def.	Devin Lucero	Submission (Rear-Naked Choke)	1	1:32
	Joshua Montoya	def.	Daniel Armendariz	Submission (Arm-Triangle Choke)	3	2:48
	Darrel Priddy	def.	Victor Chavez	TKO (Punches)	1	1:55
	Mike Orchowski	def.	Rylan Sandoval	Decision (Unanimous)	3	5:00
	Armando Irigoyen	def.	Darrell Euler	Submission (Rear-Naked Choke)	1	1:06
	Isaque Martinez	def.	Rafael Irigoyen	Submission (Keylock)	1	1:20
	Sidiah Parker	def.	Freddy Sandoval	TKO (Punches)	1	4:38
	Oliver Parker	def.	Abross Tsyatwho	Submission (Punches)	1	2:58
	Eugene Rodriguez	def.	Josh Wilner	Submission (Armbar)	2	1:05
	Roger Kelly	def.	Josh Nilson	Submission (Punches)	2	0:46
	Marcie Walker	def.	Melody Nanez	Decision (Unanimous)	3	5:00
	Jesse Jaramillo	def.	Terry Yazzie	TKO (Punches)	2	3:40

== KOTC: Distorted ==
KOTC: Distorted was an event held on October 1, 2009, at San Manuel Casino in Highland, California.

=== Results ===
Main Card
Weight class				Method	Round	Time	Notes
Heavyweight	Tony Lopez (c)	def.	Joey Beltran	Decision (Unanimous)	5	5:00	(Note: For the King of the Cage Heavyweight Championship.)
Welterweight	Michael Guymon (c)	def.	Quinn Mulhern	Submission (Punch)	4	4:32	(Note: For the King of the Cage Welterweight Championship.)
Junior Welterweight	Ricky Legere Jr.	def.	Waachiim Spiritwolf	TKO (Punches)	2	2:25	(Note: For the King of the Cage Junior Welterweight Championship.)
	Nick Gaston	def.	Boban Simic	Decision (Unanimous)	3	3:00
	Brandon Hunt	def.	Joe Crilly	KO (Punches)	3	0:24
	Ben Lagman	def.	Uber Gallegos	Submission (Guillotine Choke)	1	0:28
	Liron Wilson	def.	Mike Bourke	Submission (Kimura)	1	2:12

== KOTC: Jolted ==
KOTC: Jolted was an event held on October 3, 2009, at Avi Resort and Casino in Laughlin, Nevada.

=== Results ===
Main Card
Weight class				Method	Round	Time	Notes
	Scotty Merrit	def.	Shawn Canova	Decision (Unanimous)	3	3:00
	Zachary Brennan	def.	Eric King	Submission (Triangle Choke)	1	1:24
	Sean Strickland	def.	William Wheeler	Submission (Rear-Naked Choke)	1	1:55
	Richard Solis	def.	Josh Kistner	TKO (Punches)	2	1:08
	Jason Lane	def.	Josh Lewis	TKO (Punches)	1	1:10
	Greg Guzman	def.	Chris Wolf	Submission (Armbar)	1	2:21
	Ernie Calma	def.	Kasey Roberts	TKO (Punches)	1	2:13
	Matt Muramoto	def.	Joseph Urias	TKO (Punches)	1	2:52
	Alex Silva	def.	Garrett Ludwig	Submission (Guillotine Choke)	1	0:30
	Ramon Fajardo	def.	Adriel Montes	Submission (Arm-Triangle Choke)	N/A	N/A
	Victor Rodarte	def.	John Duran	Decision (Unanimous)	3	3:00
	Bobby Green	def.	Jeff Torch	TKO (Submission to Punches)	1	1:29
	Jonathan Brandon	def.	Zach Matthews	Submission (Kimura)	2	1:45
	Scott Brommage	def.	Oscar Hernandez	TKO (Punches)	2	2:38
	Joe Acuna	def.	George Wright	TKO (Punches)	1	1:55

== KOTC: Strike Point ==
KOTC: Strike Point was an event held on October 10, 2009, at Lake of the Torches Casino in Lac du Flambeau, Wisconsin.

=== Results ===
Main Card
Weight class				Method	Round	Time	Notes
	Ray Lopez	def.	Caleb Nelson	Submission (Guillotine Choke)	2	0:46
	Myles Jury	def.	Garrett Olson	Submission (Armbar)	1	1:09
	Wes Ronchi	vs.	Eric Moon	No Contest (Illegal Axe Kick)	1	0:00
	Daron Cruickshank	def.	Ricky Stettner	KO (Spinning Backfist)	1	2:23
	Luis Ramirez	def.	Adam Kope	Submission (Armbar)	1	2:31
	Jon Barker	def.	Chris Beck	TKO (Punches)	2	2:30
	Rocky Delorme	def.	Shane Cadotte	Decision (Unanimous)	3	3:00
	Brandon Johnson	def.	Joe Kruz	Submission (Rear-Naked Choke)	1	1:19
	Andrew Trace	def.	Justin Jaynes	TKO (Punches)	2	1:38
	Anthony Christodoulou	def.	Adrian Pierson	TKO (Punches)	3	1:00
	John Duch	def.	Josh Johnson	Submission (Rear-Naked Choke)	1	0:30
	Dale Bennett	def.	Charlie Wilczek	Decision (Unanimous)	3	3:00

== KOTC: Rip Tide ==
KOTC: Rip Tide was an event held on October 10, 2009, at Quinault Beach Resort and Casino in Ocean Shores, Washington.

=== Results ===
Main Card
Weight class				Method	Round	Time	Notes
	Jason Monroy	def.	John Daigneault	TKO (Punches)	1	1:18
	Arjay Murphy	def.	Gurdarshan Mangat	Submission (Punches)	1	2:45
	Brandon Shorter	def.	Chris Eggleston	TKO (Punches)	1	2:04
	Joe Fallis	def.	Ollie Tiglao	TKO (Punches)	3	2:52
	Mike Stokes	def.	Eddie Serrano	Submission (Punches)	1	2:35
	Billy Sullivan	def.	Paul Begnaud	Submission (Guillotine Choke)	1	1:23
	Nick Ryan	def.	Jorey Taylor	TKO (Punches)	1	0:52
	Erik Larson	def.	Jake Fletcherby	Submission (Kimura)	1	1:25
	Tommy Fasu	def.	Adam Marshall	Submission (Guillotine Choke)	1	2:45
	Taki Uluilakepa	def.	Eric Armey	Decision (Unanimous)	3	3:00
	Kina Peneueta	def.	Harrison Bevens	TKO (Punches)	2	2:25

== KOTC: Wreckage ==
KOTC: Wreckage was an event held on October 30, 2009, at Lucky Star Casino in Clinton, Oklahoma.

=== Results ===
Main Card
Weight class				Method	Round	Time	Notes
	Jon Hill	def.	John Orr	KO (Punch)	1	0:28
	Ruben Zamarron	def.	David Davis	Submission (Punches)	1	0:41
	Isaiah Reyes	def.	Joe Blurton	Submission (Guillotine Choke)	1	1:55
	Tyler East	def.	Joel Traves	TKO (Punches)	1	3:23
	Turrell Galloway	def.	Michael Hannan	Submission (Rear-Naked Choke)	1	2:49
	Rico Cato	def.	Brad Nordquist	TKO (Punches)	2	0:36
	Jerry Preece	def.	Edwin Coleman	Submission (Rear-Naked Choke)	2	1:12
	David Patterson	def.	Eric Medina	Submission (Guillotine Choke)	2	0:53
	Alan Gomez	def.	Jeremy Cantley	TKO (Punches)	2	1:16
	Jacob Johnson	def.	Karl Mason	Submission (Punches)	1	1:39
	James Thomas	def.	Cael Shields	TKO (Punches)	1	1:38

== KOTC: Horse Power ==
KOTC: Horse Power was an event held on November 28, 2009, at the Inn of the Mountain Gods Resort and Casino in Mescalero, New Mexico.

=== Results ===
Main Card
Weight class				Method	Round	Time	Notes
Bantamweight	Donald Sanchez (c)	def.	Richard Montano	Decision (Unanimous)	5	5:00	(Note: For the King of the Cage Bantamweight Championship.)
	Barb Honchak	def.	Monica Lovato	Submission (Rear-Naked Choke)	2	3:58
	Tim Means	def.	John Cronk	Submission (Rear-Naked Choke)	1	0:46
	Javier Rubio	def.	Brad Nordquist	Submission (Arm-Triangle Choke)	2	3:59
	Frank Baca	def.	Joe Salazar	Submission (Guillotine Choke)	1	0:54
	Tyler East	def.	Mark Martinez	TKO (Punches)	1	2:02
	Lafayette Barela	def.	John Craycraft	TKO (Punches)	1	0:38
	Boy Morgan	def.	Josh Salazar	TKO (Punches)	1	2:25
	Marcel Cloud	def.	Frank Kratochvil	TKO (Knees)	1	1:02
	Frank Martinez	def.	David Mejias	TKO (Punches)	1	0:58
	Robert Patino	def.	Brian Chavez	Submission (Guillotine Choke)	1	0:46
	Trey Solomon	def.	Andrew Vasquez	Submission (Rear-Naked Choke)	2	1:24
	Edward Misquez	def.	Edward Smith	Submission (Guillotine Choke)	1	0:36

== KOTC: Title Defense ==
KOTC: Title Defense was an event held on December 12, 2009, at Kewadin Casino in Sault Ste. Marie, Michigan.

=== Results ===
Main Card
Weight class				Method	Round	Time	Notes
Lightweight	David Shepherd	def.	Tony Hervey (c)	Submission (Rear-Naked Choke)	1	4:19	(Note: For the King of the Cage Lightweight Championship.)
	Chad Herrick	def.	Andy Coranado	TKO (Punches)	1	1:40
	Jeff Elliot	def.	Jonathan Spears	TKO (Punches)	1	0:26
	Gerald Lovato	def.	York Ash	Decision (Unanimous)	3	3:00
	Eddie Deluca	def.	Mark Rojo	TKO (Punches)	1	0:38
	Charlie Cosins	def.	Robby Longwith	Submission (Rear-Naked Choke)	1	1:04
	Brian Kent	def.	Mitch Rice	TKO (Punches)	1	1:27
	Trevor Manchester	def.	Joey Baycroft	Decision (Unanimous)	3	3:00
	Branden Mead	def.	Chris Gonzalez	Decision (Unanimous)	3	3:00
	Dulton McFarlden	def.	Ricky Patton	Submission (Punches)	2	2:14
	Ray Gowlet	def.	Richard Wells	Decision (Unanimous)	3	3:00
	Carl Deaton	def.	Derrick Tumbull	TKO (Punches)	1	1:02
	Adrian Vilaca	def.	Joe Marcotti	Submission (Rear-Naked Choke)	2	2:13

== KOTC: Fight 4 Hope ==
KOTC: Fight 4 Hope was an event held on December 17, 2009, at San Manuel Casino in Highland, California.

=== Results ===
Main Card
Weight class				Method	Round	Time	Notes
Heavyweight	Tony Lopez (c)	def.	Tyler East	Decision (Split)	5	5:00	(Note: For the King of the Cage Heavyweight Championship.)
Junior Welterweight	Ricky Legere Jr. (c)	def.	Eric Moon	Submission (Armbar)	1	3:04	(Note: For the King of the Cage Junior Welterweight Championship.)
	Bobby Green	def.	Charles Bennett	KO (Punch)	1	2:17
	Jon Murphy	def.	Dave Huckaba	Submission (North-South Choke)	1	4:14
	Kenny McCorkell	def.	Ben Lagman	Submission (Triangle Choke)	1	1:13
	Danny Davis Jr.	def.	Jared Lara	Decision (Split)	3	5:00
	Adam Rothweiler	def.	Ston Lee	Submission (Rear-Naked Choke)	2	1:47
	David Gomez	def.	Charles Evan Thompson	Decision (Unanimous)	3	5:00

== See also ==
- List of King of the Cage events
- List of King of the Cage champions
