= Angelo Sanchez =

American mixed martial arts (MMA) fighter

- Other names: The San-I Warrior
- Nationality: American
- Height: 5 ft 7 in (1.70 m)
- Weight: 145 lb (66 kg; 10.4 st)
- Division: 145
- Fighting out of: Santa Fe, New Mexico
- Years active: 2007–present

Mixed martial arts record
- Total: 18
- Wins: 12
- By knockout: 3
- By submission: 7
- By decision: 2
- Losses: 6
- By knockout: 1
- By submission: 2
- By decision: 3

Other information
- Mixed martial arts record from Sherdog
- Last updated on: June, 2010

Angelo Sanchez is an American mixed martial artist fighting primarily fighting for King of the Cage. Sanchez is a former KOTC Bantamweight and Interim Champion.

== Mixed martial arts career ==
Sanchez made his professional debut on June 9, 2007, with a submission loss to Jerome Griego at Gladiator Challenge 65.

Sanchez won the KOTC Interim Bantamweight championship with a victory over Tony Hervey at King of the Cage: Goodfellas on December 6, 2008. Sanchez was supposed to face the Bantamweight Champion Lazar Stojadinovic at that event, but Stojadinovic could not defend the belt due to injury. Sanchez has defended that championship against Nathan Torrez and Donald Sanchez and was then awarded the actual KOTC Bantamweight Champion. Sanchez's second fight against Donald Sanchez unified the KOTC Bantamweight titles as, Donald Sanchez had been awarded the Interim title after defeating Stojadinovic in August 2009. He lost the KOTC Bantamweight title to Donald Sanchez at KOTC Honor on May 14, 2010.

== Mixed martial arts record ==
Professional record breakdown
18 matches	12 wins	6 losses
By knockout	3	1
By submission	7	2
By decision	2	3

Res.	Record	Opponent	Method	Event	Date	Round	Time	Location	Notes
Loss	12–6	Gabriel Benitez	Decision (unanimous)	Triple A MMA 5	March 29, 2014	3	5:00	Albuquerque, New Mexico, United States	
Loss	12–5	Desmond Green	TKO (cut)	Bellator 105	October 25, 2013	2	1:04	Rio Rancho, New Mexico, United States	
Loss	12–4	Ray Borg	Decision (unanimous)	Triple A MMA 3	August 18, 2013	3	5:00	Albuquerque, New Mexico, United States	
Win	12–3	Richard Schiller	Submission (arm triangle choke)	King of the Cage: Night Stalker	January 16, 2012	1	4:01	Santa Fe, New Mexico, United States	
Win	11–3	Jacob Clark	Submission (armbar)	KOTC: High Performance	November 19, 2011	2	2:08	Santa Fe, New Mexico, United States	
Win	10–3	Amross Teasaytwho	Submission (armbar)	KOTC: Underground 71	October 15, 2011	1	2:08	Cortez, Colorado, United States	
Win	9–3	Daniel Armendariz	Submission (triangle choke)	KOTC: Adrenaline	June 4, 2010	2	1:47	Mescalero, New Mexico, United States	
Loss	8–3	Donald Sanchez	Decision (split)	KOTC: Honor	May 14, 2010	5	5:00	Mescalero, New Mexico, United States	Lost the KOTC Bantamweight Championship.
Win	8–2	Richard Montano	TKO (punches)	KOTC: Native Warriors	March 6, 2010	2	4:20	Santa Fe, New Mexico, United States	Catchweight (150 lb) bout.
Win	7–2	Donald Sanchez	Decision (split)	KOTC: Retribution II	May 30, 2009	5	5:00	Mescalero, New Mexico, United States	Defended the interim KOTC Bantamweight Championship. Later promoted to undisputed champion.
Win	6–2	Nathan Torrez	Submission (armbar)	KOTC: New Breed	March 7, 2009	1	3:58	Mescalero, New Mexico, United States	Defended the interim KOTC Bantamweight Championship.
Win	5–2	Tony Hervey	Decision (split)	KOTC: Goodfellas	December 6, 2008	5	3:00	Albuquerque, New Mexico, United States	Won the interim KOTC Bantamweight Championship.
Win	4–2	Eric Buck	TKO	Fightworld 16: International	November 1, 2008	1	3:21	Albuquerque, New Mexico, United States	
Win	3–2	Mike Alirez	Submission (armbar)	KOTC: Badlands	July 12, 2008	2	2:54	Albuquerque, New Mexico, United States	
Loss	2–2	Matt Young	Submission	Sky UTE Fighting	March 15, 2008	2	1:36	Ignacio, Colorado, United States	
Win	2–1	Carlos Lopez	TKO	Desert Extreme: Toe 2 Toe	February 2, 2008			New Mexico, United States	
Win	1–1	David Valverde	Submission (rear-naked choke)	KOTC: Hierarchy	October 13, 2007	1	1:45	Albuquerque, New Mexico, United States	
Loss	0–1	Jerome Griego	Submission (rear-naked choke)	Gladiator Challenge 65: Global War	June 9, 2007	3	1:26	New Mexico, United States	

== See also ==
- List of KOTC champions

Awards and achievements
Preceded by Lazar Stojadinovic	7th King of the Cage Bantamweight Champion; August 1, 2009 – May 14, 2010	Succeeded by Donald Sanchez
