= Donald Sanchez =

American mixed martial arts fighter

- Born: August 18, 1984 (age 42); Albuquerque, New Mexico, United States
- Nationality: American
- Height: 5 ft 10 in (1.78 m)
- Weight: 145 lb (66 kg; 10.4 st)
- Division: Featherweight; Lightweight; Welterweight
- Reach: 70.0
- Fighting out of: Albuquerque, New Mexico, United States
- Team: Jackson-Wink MMA
- Years active: 2005–present

Mixed martial arts record
- Total: 49
- Wins: 31
- By knockout: 12
- By submission: 11
- By decision: 8
- Losses: 18
- By knockout: 1
- By submission: 7
- By decision: 10

Bare-knuckle boxing record
- Total: 7
- Wins: 4
- By knockout: 2
- Losses: 3
- By knockout: 0

Other information
- Mixed martial arts record from Sherdog

Donald Sanchez (born August 8, 1984) is an American bare-knuckle boxer currently competing in the Bare Knuckle Fighting Championship. He is also a mixed martial artist who competed in the Featherweight division. A professional competitor since 2005, he has also competed for Bellator, Absolute Championship Berkut, King of the Cage, the MFC, Legacy FC, and the RFA.

As of April 13, 2026, he is #5 in the BKFC middleweight rankings.

== Mixed martial arts career ==
=== Bellator MMA ===
Sanchez faced Johnny Eduardo on April 17, 2009, at Bellator III. He lost the fight via unanimous decision.

Sanchez defeated Cliff Wright at Bellator 97 on July 31, 2013, via split decision.

=== Absolute Championship Berkut ===
Sanchez signed a four-fight deal with the ACB in October 2016.

His debut at ACB were on 18 December 2016 at ACB 50: Rasulov vs. Goltsov in St.Petersburg, Russia against Adlan Bataev. He lost the fight via unanimous decision (29–28, 29–28, 29–28).

Sanchez was expected to face Yusuf Raisov on March 24, 2017, at the ACB 55. However, Sanchez pulled out a few days before the fight and was replaced by Valdines Silva.

Sanchez faced Alexey Polpudnikov on July 23, 2017, at ACB 65. He lost the fight via knockout in the first round.

== Bare-knuckle boxing ==
After four bouts with the Bare Knuckle Fighting Championship, Sanchez competed against Harrison Aiken on February 28, 2025 at BKFC Fight Night 21 and won the bout by unanimous decision.

Sanchez challenged David Mundell for the BKFC Middleweight Championship at BKFC 75 on June 6, 2025 in Albuquerque, NM. He lost the fight by unanimous decision.

Sanchez faced Jeremy Smith at BKFC 87 on March 20, 2026. He lost the fight by split decision.

== Mixed martial arts record ==
Professional record breakdown
51 matches	31 wins	20 losses
By knockout	12	3
By submission	11	6
By decision	8	11

Res.	Record	Opponent	Method	Event	Date	Round	Time	Location	Notes
Loss	31–20	Fernando Padilla	TKO (punches)	LFA 58	January 25, 2019	2	1:27	Albuquerque, New Mexico, United States	
Loss	31–19	Lorawnt-T Nelson	Decision (unanimous)	SCL - Army vs Marines 9	June 30, 2018	3	5:00	Denver, Colorado, United States	
Loss	31–18	Rey Trujillo	KO (punches)	Rocks Xtreme MMA 23	March 10, 2018	3	5:00	Corpus Christi, Texas, United States	
Loss	31–17	Alexey Polpudnikov	KO (punches)	ACB 65: Silva vs. Agnaev	July 22, 2017	3	5:00	Sheffield, England	
Loss	31–16	Adlan Bataev	Decision (unanimous)	ACB 50: Stormbringer	December 18, 2016	3	5:00	St.Petersburg, Leningrad, Russia	
Win	31–15	Nick Rhoads	Decision (unanimous)	Jackson's MMA Series 16	October 17, 2015	3	5:00	Santa Fe, New Mexico, United States	
Loss	30–15	Mark Dickman	Submission (kimura)	RFA 22: Smith vs. Njokuani	January 9, 2015	1	1:37	Colorado Springs, Colorado, United States	
Win	30–14	Charles Cheeks III	Decision (unanimous)	LFC 36: Legacy Fighting Championship 36	October 17, 2014	3	5:00	Allen, Texas, United States	
Loss	29–14	Flavio Alvaro	Decision (unanimous)	LFC 30: Legacy Fighting Championship 30	April 4, 2014	3	5:00	Albuquerque, New Mexico, United States	
Win	29–13	Cliff Wright	Decision (split)	Bellator XCVII	July 31, 2013	3	5:00	Rio Rancho, New Mexico, United States	
Win	28–13	Matt Comeau	TKO (punches)	KOTC: Regulators	January 19, 2013	2	4:46	Scottsdale, Arizona, United States	Defended the KOTC Bantamweight Championship.
Win	27–13	Jimmy Van Horn	Submission (punches)	KOTC: Ignite	August 11, 2012	1	2:32	Santa Fe, New Mexico, United States	Defended the KOTC Bantamweight Championship.
Win	26–13	Warren Stewart	Decision (unanimous)	KOTC: Nightmare	May 12, 2012	5	5:00	Santa Fe, New Mexico, United States	Defended the KOTC Bantamweight Championship.
Loss	25–13	Tatsuya Kawajiri	Submission (triangle choke)	One FC 3: War of the Lions	March 31, 2012	1	3:27	Kallang, Singapore	Featherweight bout.
Win	25–12	Jamie Steichen	TKO (punches)	KOTC: Prohibited	March 17, 2012	1	2:05	Norman, Oklahoma, United States	Won the vacant KOTC Bantamweight Championship.
Win	24–12	Chris Culley	KO (punches)	KOTC: Night Stalker	January 14, 2012	1	4:45	Santa Fe, New Mexico, United States	
Win	23–12	Ira Boyd	Submission (rear-naked choke)	KOTC: Apocalypse	September 17, 2011	1	2:52	Thackerville, Oklahoma, United States	
Loss	22–12	Jeremy Spoon	Decision (split)	KOTC: Overdrive	August 20, 2011	5	5:00	Norman, Oklahoma, United States	Lost the KOTC Bantamweight Championship.
Loss	22–11	Hatsu Hioki	Submission (triangle choke)	Shooto: Shooto Tradition 2011	April 29, 2011	2	1:36	Tokyo, Japan	
Win	22–10	Scott Bear	Submission (guillotine choke)	KOTC: Confrontation	January 15, 2011	1	3:02	Santa Fe, New Mexico, United States	Defended the KOTC Bantamweight Championship.
Win	21–10	Pat McGreal	Submission (rear-naked choke)	KOTC: No Mercy	September 17, 2010	1	2:27	Mashantucket, Connecticut, United States	Defended the KOTC Bantamweight Championship.
Win	20–10	Angelo Sanchez	Decision (split)	KOTC: Honor	May 14, 2010	5	5:00	Mescalero, New Mexico, United States	Won and unified the KOTC Bantamweight Championship.
Win	19–10	Victor Valenzuela	TKO (punches)	KOTC: Vengeance	February 12, 2010	4	4:05	Mescalero, New Mexico, United States	Defended the interim KOTC Bantamweight Championship.
Win	18–10	Richard Montano	Decision (unanimous)	KOTC: Horse Power	November 28, 2009	5	5:00	Mescalero, New Mexico, United States	Defended the interim KOTC Bantamweight Championship.
Win	17–10	John Sargent	TKO (punches)	NLCF: Storm	August 15, 2009	1	1:23	Cheyenne, Wyoming, United States	
Win	16–10	Lazar Stojadinovic	Decision (unanimous)	KOTC: Gate Keeper	August 1, 2009	5	5:00	Mescalero, New Mexico, United States	Won the interim KOTC Bantamweight Championship.
Loss	15–10	Angelo Sanchez	Decision (split)	KOTC: Retribution II	May 30, 2009	5	5:00	Mescalero, New Mexico, United States	For the interim KOTC Bantamweight Championship.
Loss	15–9	Johnny Eduardo	Decision (unanimous)	Bellator III	April 17, 2009	3	5:00	Norman, Oklahoma, United States	Catchweight (147 lbs) bout.
Loss	15–8	Victor Valenzuela	Decision (unanimous)	KOTC: Immortal	February 27, 2009	5	5:00	Highland, California, United States	For the KOTC Light Welterweight Championship.
Win	15–7	Nathan Randall	TKO (punches)	KOTC: Goodfellas	December 6, 2008	1	4:41	Albuquerque, New Mexico, United States	
Win	14–7	Darryl Madison	Submission	FW 16: International	November 1, 2008	1	4:00	Albuquerque, New Mexico, United States	
Win	13–7	Jason Maxwell	Submission (triangle choke)	MFC 17: Hostile Takeover	July 25, 2008	2	4:03	Edmonton, Alberta, Canada	
Win	12–7	Titus Holmes	Submission (rear-naked choke)	KOTC: Badlands	July 12, 2008	1	3:14	Albuquerque, New Mexico, United States	
Win	11–7	William Sriyapai	TKO	KOTC: Opposing Force	May 15, 2008	2	3:41	Highland, California, United States	
Loss	10–7	Justin Moore	Decision (split)	FCF: Freestyle Cage Fighting 17	March 15, 2008	3	3:00	Shawnee, Oklahoma, United States	
Win	10–6	R Romero	Submission (armbar)	KOTC: Warlords	February 9, 2008	2	0:00	Towaoc, Colorado, United States	
Loss	9–6	Ryan Heck	Decision (unanimous)	MFC 14: High Rollers	November 23, 2007	3	5:00	Edmonton, Alberta, Canada	
Loss	9–5	Vito Woods	Decision (unanimous)	KOTC: Hierarchy	October 13, 2007	2	5:00	Albuquerque, New Mexico, United States	
Win	9–4	Ryan McGillivray	Decision (unanimous)	MFC 13: Lucky 13	August 24, 2007	3	5:00	Edmonton, Alberta, Canada	
Loss	8–4	Cody Shipp	Submission (armbar)	FW 15: Rumble at Rt. 66 Casino	July 28, 2007	3	0:38	Albuquerque, New Mexico, United States	
Win	8–3	Donnie Frye	Submission (armbar)	MCC: Midwest Cage Combat	June 23, 2007	1	4:30	Wichita, Kansas, United States	
Win	7–3	Patrick Lopez	KO (knee)	FW 14: Cinco de Whoop Ass 2	May 6, 2007	1	0:00	New Mexico, United States	
Win	6–3	Donnie Martinez	KO (punches)	DE: World War	January 26, 2007	2	0:30	New Mexico, United States	
Loss	5–3	Buddy Clinton	Submission (rear-naked choke)	KOTC: Cyclone	November 11, 2006	1	2:51	Tulsa, Oklahoma, United States	
Win	5–2	Mark Kempthorne	TKO (punches)	KOTC: BOOYAA	October 13, 2006	2	4:14	San Jacinto, California, United States	
Loss	4–2	Johnny Vasquez	Submission	KOTC: Rapid Fire	August 4, 2006	2	2:44	San Jacinto, California, United States	
Win	4–1	Robert Montiel	TKO (corner stoppage)	DE: Desert Extreme	June 17, 2006	1	5:00	New Mexico, United States	
Win	3–1	Christian Montano	Submission (triangle choke)	DE: Mayhem	May 26, 2006	1	1:54	Santa Fe, New Mexico, United States	
Loss	2–1	Donnie Martinez	Submission (guillotine choke)	DE: Socorro	April 8, 2006	1	2:53	New Mexico, United States	
Win	2–0	Joe Montoya	TKO	DE: Tribal Nation	February 4, 2006	1	0:00	New Mexico, United States	
Win	1–0	Joseph Davidson	Submission (rear-naked choke)	DE: Socorro Showdown	December 10, 2005	1	1:02	New Mexico, United States	

== Bare knuckle record ==
Professional record breakdown
7 matches	4 wins	3 losses
By knockout	2	0
By decision	2	3

Res.	Record	Opponent	Method	Event	Date	Round	Time	Location	Notes
Loss	4–3	Jeremy Smith	Decision (split)	BKFC 87	March 20, 2026	5	2:00	Hollywood, Florida, United States	
Loss	4–2	David Mundell	Decision (unanimous)	BKFC 75	June 6, 2025	5	2:00	Albuquerque, New Mexico, United States	For the BKFC Middleweight Championship.
Win	4–1	Harrison Aike	Decision (unanimous)	BKFC Fight Night Albuquerque: Richardson vs. Usmanov	February 28, 2025	5	2:00	Albuquerque, New Mexico, United States	
Win	3–1	Dallas Davison	KO	BKFC 59	March 29, 2024	3	1:19	Albuquerque, New Mexico, United States	
Win	2–1	Noah Cutter	KO	BKFC Fight Night Prospects: Albuquerque	January 27, 2024	1	0:35	Albuquerque, New Mexico, United States	Middleweight debut.
Win	1–1	Anthony Lacaze	Decision (unanimous)	BKFC 48	August 11, 2023	5	2:00	Albuquerque, New Mexico, United States	
Loss	0–1	Jeremy Smith	Decision (unanimous)	BKFC 28	August 27, 2022	5	2:00	Albuquerque, New Mexico, United States	Light Heavyweight debut.

== See also ==
- List of male mixed martial artists

Awards and achievements
Preceded by Angelo Sanchez	8th King of the Cage Bantamweight Champion; May 14, 2010 – August 20, 2011	Succeeded by Jeremy Spoon
Awards and achievements
Preceded by Jeremy Spoon	10th King of the Cage Bantamweight Champion; March 17, 2012 – 2013	Succeeded by Henry Corrales
