= 2007 in Maximum Fighting Championship =

Information
- First date: February 3, 2007
- Last date: November 23, 2007

Events
- Total events: 5

Fights
- Total fights: 53
- Title fights: 1

Chronology
| 2006 in MFC | 2007 in Maximum Fighting Championship | 2008 in MFC |

The year 2007 is the 6th year in the history of the Maximum Fighting Championship, a mixed martial arts promotion based in Canada. In 2007 Maximum Fighting Championship held 5 events beginning with, MFC 11: Gridiron.

== Title fights ==
Title fights in 2007
| Weight class | | | | Method | Round | Time | Event | Notes |
|---|---|---|---|---|---|---|---|---|
| Light Heavyweight | Roger Hollett | def. | Victor Valimaki (c) | Submission (Punches) | | 2:06 | MFC 13: Lucky 13 | (Note: For the MFC Light Heavyweight Championship) |

== Events list ==
| # | Event title | Date | Arena | Location | Attendance |
|---|---|---|---|---|---|
| 17 | MFC 14: High Rollers | November 23, 2007 | River Cree Resort and Casino | Edmonton, Alberta | |
| 16 | MFC 13: Lucky 13 | August 24, 2007 | River Cree Resort and Casino | Edmonton, Alberta | |
| 15 | MFC 12: High Stakes | June 22, 2007 | River Cree Resort and Casino | Edmonton, Alberta | |
| 14 | MFC: Unplugged 3 | April 20, 2007 | River Cree Resort and Casino | Edmonton, Alberta | |
| 13 | MFC 11: Gridiron | February 3, 2007 | Shaw Conference Centre | Edmonton, Alberta | |

== MFC 11: Gridiron ==
MFC 11: Gridiron was an event held on February 3, 2007, at the Shaw Conference Centre in Edmonton, Alberta, Canada.

=== Results ===
Main Card
| Weight class | | | | Method | Round | Time | Notes |
|---|---|---|---|---|---|---|---|
| | Victor Valimaki | def. | Jared Kilkenny | KO (Punches) | 1 | 3:26 |
| | Adam Braidwood | def. | Ryan Jimmo | TKO (Punches) | 1 | 1:54 |
| | Roger Hollett | def. | Mike Maurer | KO (Head Kick and Punches) | 1 | 0:36 |
| | Steve Bruno | def. | Graydon Tannas | Submission (Rear-Naked Choke) | 1 | 1:15 |
| | Matt MacGrath | def. | Nigel Zettergreen | Decision (Split) | 3 | 5:00 |
| | Ryan McGillivray | def. | Aaron Gallant | Submission (Armbar) | 1 | 2:45 |
| | Sean Locke | def. | Dan Chambers | Submission (Arm-Triangle Choke) | 1 | 4:50 |
| | Ryan Machan | def. | Tim Blanchard | TKO (Punches) | 1 | 2:01 |
| | Kyle Ayotte | def. | Mike Bell | Submission (Rear-Naked Choke) | 1 | 2:12 |
| | Josh Kyrejto | def. | Paul Ebejer | Submission (Guillotine Choke) | 1 | 0:21 |

== MFC: Unplugged 3 ==
MFC: Unplugged 3 was an event held on April 20, 2007, at the River Cree Resort and Casino in Edmonton, Alberta, Canada.

=== Results ===
Main Card
| Weight class | | | | Method | Round | Time | Notes |
|---|---|---|---|---|---|---|---|
| | Scott Junk | def. | Dominic Richard | Submission (Verbal) | 2 | 1:23 |
| | Ryan Jimmo | def. | Dwayne Lewis | Decision (Unanimous) | 3 | 5:00 |
| | Ryan McGillivray | def. | Kyle Ayotte | Submission (Armbar) | 1 | 4:42 |
| | Ryan Lawley | def. | Tim Blanchard | Decision (Unanimous) | 3 | 5:00 |
| | Sean Wright | def. | Tim Kelly | Submission (Rear-Naked Choke) | 1 | 0:45 |
| | Garrett Curran | def. | Josh Kyrejto | Submission (Rear-Naked Choke) | 3 | 3:28 |
| | Kevin Dolan | def. | Dave Pogson | Submission (Guillotine Choke) | 1 | 3:23 |
| | Ryan Heck | def. | Adam MacDonald | Submission (Rear-Naked Choke) | 1 | 0:53 |
| | Mike Sorenson | def. | Mike Tubbs | Decision (Unanimous) | 3 | 5:00 |

== MFC 12: High Stakes ==
MFC 12: High Stakes was an event held on June 22, 2007, at the River Cree Resort and Casino in Edmonton, Alberta, Canada.

=== Results ===
Main Card
| Weight class | | | | Method | Round | Time | Notes |
|---|---|---|---|---|---|---|---|
| | Scott Junk | def. | Jimmy Ambriz | TKO (Corner Stoppage) | 1 | 5:00 |
| | Roger Hollett | def. | Shane Biever | KO (Punches) | 1 | 0:15 |
| | Fabio Holanda | def. | Shaun Krysa | Submission (Punches) | 2 | 1:48 |
| | Ryan McGillivray | def. | Graydon Tannas | Decision (Split) | 3 | 5:00 |
| | Jason Biggeman | def. | Gerry Johnson | Submission (Kimura) | 1 | 2:59 |
| | Andrew Buckland | def. | Sean Wright | Submission (Guillotine Choke) | 2 | 0:39 |
| | Ryan Ford | def. | Aaron Gallant | TKO (Punches) | | 4:15 |
| | Jason Zorthian | def. | Kevin Dolan | Submission (Armbar) | 1 | 0:35 |
| | Josh Kyrejto | def. | Dillon Walton | TKO (Punches) | 2 | 2:15 |
| | Josh Gallant | def. | Justin Graber | Submission (Rear Naked Choke) | 1 | 1:50 |
| | Brad Zazulak | def. | Ron McNulty | Submission (Guillotine Choke) | 2 | 0:23 |

== MFC 13: Lucky 13 ==
MFC 13: Lucky 13 was an event held on August 24, 2007, at the River Cree Resort and Casino in Edmonton, Alberta, Canada.

=== Results ===
Main Card
| Weight class | | | | Method | Round | Time | Notes |
|---|---|---|---|---|---|---|---|
| Light Heavyweight | Roger Hollett | def. | Victor Valimaki (c) | Submission (Punches) | | 2:06 | (Note: MFC 13: Lucky 13) |
| | Donald Sanchez | def. | Ryan McGillivray | Decision (Unanimous) | 3 | 5:00 |
| | Brad Zazulak | def. | Luke Harris | TKO (Punches) | 1 | 1:27 |
| | Ryan Ford | def. | Randy Valette | TKO (Punches and Elbows) | 1 | 2:07 |
| | Ryan Heck | def. | Mike Bell | Submission (Rear Naked Choke) | 1 | 3:44 |
| | Dwayne Lewis | def. | Clay Davidson | TKO (Punches) | 1 | 1:41 |
| | Jason Kuchera | def. | Steve Dubeck | TKO (Punches) | 1 | 0:28 |
| | Nick Penner | def. | David Lainoff | Submission (Kimura) | 1 | 1:57 |
| | Mike Gates | def. | Jason Biggeman | Submission (Armbar) | 1 | 1:23 |
| | Mike Sorenson | def. | Joshua Fletcher | TKO (Punches) | 2 | 4:46 |
| | Jason Randle | def. | JC Cousins | TKO (Punches) | 1 | 1:13 |

== MFC 14: High Rollers ==
MFC 14: High Rollers was an event held on November 23, 2007, at the River Cree Resort and Casino in Edmonton, Alberta, Canada.

=== Results ===
Main Card
| Weight class | | | | Method | Round | Time | Notes |
|---|---|---|---|---|---|---|---|
| | Brad Zazulak | def. | Shonie Carter | TKO (Injury) | 1 | 2:09 |
| | Ryan Ford | def. | Mike Sorenson | TKO (Punches) | 2 | 0:51 |
| | Ryan Heck | def. | Donald Sanchez | Decision (Unanimous) | 3 | 5:00 |
| | Stjepan Vujnovic | def. | Ryan McGillivray | Technical Submission (Triangle Choke) | 2 | 2:48 |
| | Ryan Jimmo | def. | Nick Goetz | Submission (Rear Naked Choke) | 1 | 0:44 |
| | Ray Penny | def. | Dwayne Lewis | Decision (Unanimous) | 3 | 5:00 |
| | Jason Kuchera | def. | David Lainoff | TKO (Punches) | 1 | 0:23 |
| | Daniel Ferguson | def. | Josh Kyrejto | Submission (Guillotine Choke) | 1 | 2:51 |
| | Sean Wright | def. | Dave Logan | Technical Submission (Guillotine Choke) | 1 | 0:42 |
| | Gavin Neil | def. | Jason Zorthian | Submission (Triangle Choke) | 1 | 2:20 |
| | Jason Biggeman | def. | Kevin Dolan | TKO (Punches) | 1 | 4:21 |
| | Troy Sorensen | def. | Randy Valette | Submission (Armbar) | 2 | 2:33 |

== See also ==
- Maximum Fighting Championship
- List of Maximum Fighting Championship events
