= 2006 in King of the Cage =

Information
- First date: January 21, 2006
- Last date: December 1, 2006

Events
- Total events: 20

Fights
- Total fights: 231
- Title fights: 10

Chronology
2005 in KOTC	2006 in King of the Cage	2007 in KOTC

The year 2006 is the eighth year in the history of King of the Cage, a mixed martial arts promotion based in the United States. In 2006 King of the Cage held 20 events, KOTC – Outlaws.

== Title fights ==
Title fights in 2006
Weight class				Method	Round	Time	Event	Notes
Light Heavyweight	James Lee	def.	James Te Huna	Submission (Rear-Naked Choke)	1	1:37	KOTC: Gunfather	(Note: For the King of the Cage Light Heavyweight Championship.)
Lightweight	Mac Danzig (c)	def.	Jason Ireland	Decision (Unanimous)	3	5:00	KOTC: Drop Zone	(Note: For the King of the Cage Lightweight Championship.)
Light Heavyweight	James Lee (c)	def.	Brian Hawkins	Submission (Heel Hook)	1	0:24	KOTC: Drop Zone	(Note: For the King of the Cage Light Heavyweight Championship.)
Welterweight	Matt Stansell	def.	Thomas Denny (c)	Submission (Triangle Choke)	1	3:18	KOTC: The Return 2	(Note: For the King of the Cage Welterweight Championship.)
Bantamweight	Urijah Faber (c)	def.	Charlie Valencia	Submission (Rear-Naked Choke)	1	3:09	KOTC: Predator	(Note: For the King of the Cage Bantamweight Championship.)
Middleweight	Joey Villasenor (c)	def.	John Cronk	TKO	1	4:04	KOTC: Civil War	(Note: For The King of the Cage Middleweight Championship.)
Lightweight	Mac Danzig (c)	def.	Buddy Clinton	Decision (Unanimous)	3	5:00	KOTC: Rapid Fire	(Note: For the King of the Cage Lightweight Championship.)
Welterweight	Aaron Wetherspoon	def.	Thomas Kenney	KO (Punch)	2	4:54	KOTC: Rapid Fire	(Note: For the King of the Cage Welterweight Championship.)
Bantamweight	Urijah Faber (c)	def.	Bibiano Fernandes	TKO (Doctor Stoppage)	1	4:16	KOTC: All Stars	(Note: For the King of the Cage Bantamweight Championship.)
Welterweight	Aaron Wetherspoon (c)	def.	Dave Terrel	Decision (Unanimous)	3	5:00	KOTC: Destroyer	(Note: For the King of the Cage Welterweight Championship.)

== Events list ==
#	Event title	Date	Arena	Location
84	KOTC: Destroyer	December 1, 2006	Soboba Casino	San Jacinto, California
83	KOTC: Cyclone	November 11, 2006	N/A	Tulsa, Oklahoma
82	KOTC: All Stars	October 28, 2006	Reno Events Center	Reno, Nevada
81	KOTC: BOOYAA	October 13, 2006	Soboba Casino	San Jacinto, California
80	KOTC: Meltdown	October 7, 2006	Murat Theater	Indianapolis
79	KOTC: Rapid Fire	August 4, 2006	Soboba Casino	San Jacinto, California
78	KOTC: Civil War	July 29, 2006	Ute Mountain Casino	Towaoc, Colorado
77	KOTC: Shoot Out	July 22, 2006	Tulalip Resort Casino	Seattle
76	KOTC: Australia	July 8, 2006	N/A	Australia
75	KOTC: Mangler	June 9, 2006	Soboba Casino	San Jacinto, California
74	KOTC: Predator	May 13, 2006	Apache Gold Casino	Globe, Arizona
73	KOTC: Unfinished Business	April 28, 2006	N/A	Sydney, Australia
72	KOTC: Heavy Hitters	April 2, 2006	Chukchansi Gold Resort & Casino	Coarsegold, California
71	KOTC: The Return 2	March 25, 2006	N/A	San Jacinto, California
70	KOTC: The Return	March 19, 2006	Soboba Casino	San Jacinto, California
69	KOTC: Drop Zone	March 18, 2006	N/A	Mount Pleasant, Michigan
68	KOTC: Battle at Ute Mountain	March 4, 2006	Ute Mountain Casino	Towaoc, Colorado
67	KOTC: Redemption on the River	February 17, 2006	MARK of the Quad Cities	Moline, Illinois
66	KOTC: Gunfather	February 10, 2006	N/A	Australia
65	KOTC: Outlaws	January 21, 2006	N/A	Globe, Arizona

== KOTC: Outlaws ==
KOTC: Outlaws was an event held on January 21, 2006, in Globe, Arizona.

=== Results ===
Main Card
Weight class				Method	Round	Time	Notes
	Edwin Dewees	def.	Buckley Acosta	Submission (Triangle Choke)	1	0:57
	Kyacey Uscola	def.	Robert Sarkozi	Decision (Unanimous)	2	5:00
	Del Hawkins	def.	Gabe Brockmier	KO (Punch)	1	2:04
	Paul O'Keefe	def.	Johnathon Wesson	Submission (Choke)	1	2:24
	Emanuel Newton	def.	John Lansing	TKO (Punches)	1	1:04
	Matt Dell	def.	Shawn Canova	Submission (Exhaustion)	2	1:47
	Chance Williams	def.	Ron Rumpf	TKO (Punches)	1	0:21
	Jon Kessler	def.	Tony Roybal	Submission (Armbar)	1	1:54
	Esteves Jones	def.	Ryan Potter	KO (Punch)	2	1:55
	Daniel Madrid	def.	Gilbert Velez	Submission (Choke)	2	0:55
	Luke Hodges	def.	Jacob Chagolla	Decision (Unanimous)	2	5:00
	Travis Hooke	def.	Justin Scott	Submission (Guillotine Choke)	1	3:13
	Jesse Moreng	def.	Victor Hernandez	Submission (Rear-Naked Choke)	1	2:46
	Leroy Fornof	def.	Joe Castillo	TKO (Punches)	2	1:23
	David Carrasco	def.	Keith Dixon	Submission (Punches)	1	4:11
	Bryan Pardoe	def.	Ryan Pray	TKO (Punches)	1	1:30

== KOTC: Gunfather ==
KOTC: Gunfather was an event held on February 10, 2006, in Australia.

=== Results ===
Main Card
Weight class				Method	Round	Time	Notes
	Tony Bonello	vs.	Bobby Hoffman	No Contest	1	2:28
Light Heavyweight	James Lee	def.	James Te Huna	Submission (Rear-Naked Choke)	1	1:37	(Note: For the King of the Cage Light Heavyweight Championship.)
	Matt Te Paa	def.	Rhys Whitmore	Submission (Armbar)	1	0:58
	Ruben Villareal	def.	Nathan White	TKO (Punches)	1	2:54
	Jim Yorke	def.	Brad Morris	KO (Head Kick)	3	2:59
	Dylan Smith	def.	Gordon Graff	Decision (Unanimous)	2	5:00
	Adam O'Brien	def.	Andrew Morris	Submission (Rear-Naked Choke)	1	2:14
	Aaron Ryan	def.	Ali Khanchedar	KO (Punch)	1	1:26
	Roy Pariente	def.	Adam Bourke	Submission (Armbar)	1	3:53

== KOTC: Redemption on the River ==
KOTC: Redemption on the River was an event held on February 17, 2006, at MARK of the Quad Cities in Moline, Illinois.

=== Results ===
Main Card
Weight class				Method	Round	Time	Notes
	Shonie Carter	def.	Jason Black	TKO (Arm Injury)	1	1:18
	Jeff Curran	def.	Charles Bennett	Submission (Armbar)	1	3:23
	Terry Martin	def.	Trevor Garrett	KO (Knees)	1	1:40
	Gideon Ray	def.	Brendan Seguin	Submission (Heel Hook)	1	2:52
	LaVerne Clark	def.	Víctor Moreno	Decision (Unanimous)	3	5:00
	Joey Clark	def.	Brian Gassaway	Decision (Unanimous)	3	5:00
	Joe Jordan	def.	John Strawn	KO (Punch)	3	2:25
	Tristan Yunker	def.	Clay Guida	Submission (Rear-Naked Choke)	1	1:17
	Jason Reinhardt	def.	Mike Lindquist	Submission (Rear-Naked Choke)	1	2:14
	Jerry Spiegel	def.	Neal Rowe	Submission (Heel Hook)	1	1:35
	Bart Palaszewski	def.	Wayne Weems	TKO (Punches)	1	1:11
	Justin Robbins	def.	Matt Jaggers	Submission (Triangle Choke)	1	1:32
	Sean Salmon	def.	Bryan Zanders	TKO (Punches)	2	1:46
	Billy Ayash	def.	Dennis Reed	KO (Punch)	1	1:30

== KOTC: Battle at Ute Mountain ==
KOTC: Battle at Ute Mountain was an event held on March 4, 2006, at Ute Mountain Casino in Towaoc, Colorado.

=== Results ===
Main Card
Weight class				Method	Round	Time	Notes
	Floyd Sword	def.	Bryan Pardoe	Submission (Triangle Choke)	1	1:34
	Gabe Rivas	def.	Leroy Fornof	TKO	1	1:24
	Victor Valla	def.	Abe Vining	Submission (Rear Naked Choke)	1	0:40
	David Carrasco	def.	Jeff Rutheford	Submission (Guillotine Choke)	1	2:47
	Jason Keith	def.	Ron Rumpf	Submission (Rear Naked Choke)	1	1:12
	Joe Padilla	def.	Josh Peterson	TKO	1	0:36
	Gabe Brockmier	def.	Eric Swatkin	Submission (Guillotine Choke)	1	1:16
	Chris Stranger	def.	Ron Paup	TKO	1	0:30
	Jon Kessler	def.	Steve Marquez	Submission (Choke)	1	0:24
	Jacob Chagolla	def.	Jeremy Madrid	Submission (Armbar)	1	3:10
	Isaias Martinez	def.	Bryson Kratz	TKO (Corner Stoppage)	1	5:00

== KOTC: Drop Zone ==
KOTC: Drop Zone was an event held on March 18, 2006, in Mount Pleasant, Michigan.

=== Results ===
Main Card
Weight class				Method	Round	Time	Notes
Lightweight	Mac Danzig (c)	def.	Jason Ireland	Decision (Unanimous)	3	5:00	(Note: For the King of the Cage Lightweight Championship.)
Light Heavyweight	James Lee (c)	def.	Brian Hawkins	Submission (Heel Hook)	1	0:24	(Note: For the King of the Cage Light Heavyweight Championship.)
	Buddy Clinton	def.	Charles Bennett	Technical Submission (Rear-Naked Choke)	1	0:18
	Matt Shaw	def.	Dereck Keasley	Submission (Armbar)	2	N/A
	Jason Dent	def.	Joe Voisin	Submission (Guillotine Choke)	1	4:50
	Brendan Seguin	def.	Thomas Russell	Decision (Unanimous)	2	5:00
	Joshua Taibl	def.	Josh Martin	TKO (Punches)	1	2:15
	Don Richards	def.	Allan Weickert	Submission (Armbar)	1	1:55
	Tony Forgione	def.	Count Blackula	Submission (Verbal)	1	N/A
	Bryan Harper	def.	Kevin Brent	Submission (Choke)	1	0:32

== KOTC: The Return ==
KOTC: The Return was an event held on March 19, 2006, at Soboba Casino in San Jacinto, California.

=== Results ===
Main Card
Weight class				Method	Round	Time	Notes
	Victor Valenzuela	def.	Tim Cree	KO	1	0:12
	Brandon Magana	def.	Santos González	TKO	1	1:47
	George Fullwood	def.	Marshall Rodriguez	Submission (Guillotine Choke)	1	0:26
	Saad Awad	def.	Art Ruiz	DQ	1	4:43
	Dale Breese	def.	Shane Rydell	Submission (Rear Naked Choke)	1	1:45
	William Robertson	def.	Baki Baki	TKO	2	1:46
	Rubin Taigle	def.	Rocky Williams	Submission (Guillotine Choke)	2	4:02
	Sam Morgan	def.	Shannon Ritch	Submission (Toe Hold)	1	1:29
	Wes Combs	def.	Alan Zunner	Submission (Rear Naked Choke)	1	0:19
	Chris Ruyle	def.	John Incorvaia	Submission (Guillotine Choke)	1	1:26
	Jacob Chagolla	def.	Buckley Acosta	Decision	2	5:00
	Efran Deleon	def.	Bobby Lee	Decision	2	5:00

== KOTC: The Return 2 ==
KOTC: The Return 2 was an event held on March 25, 2006, in San Jacinto, California.

=== Results ===
Main Card
Weight class				Method	Round	Time	Notes
	Charlie Valencia	def.	Del Hawkins	Submission (Rear Naked Choke)	1	2:04
Welterweight	Matt Stansell	def.	Thomas Denny (c)	Submission (Triangle Choke)	1	3:18	(Note: For the King of the Cage Welterweight Championship.)

== KOTC: Heavy Hitters ==
KOTC: Heavy Hitters was an event held on April 2, 2006, at Chukchansi Gold Resort & Casino in Coarsegold, California.

=== Results ===
Main Card
Weight class				Method	Round	Time	Notes
	Emanuel Newton	def.	Richard Montoya	Decision (Unanimous)	3	5:00
	Shawn Bias	def.	Josh Gardner	Decision (Unanimous)	2	5:00
	Bo Cantrell	def.	Brian Sesma	KO (Punch)	1	0:12
	Andy Maccarone	def.	Shannon Ritch	Submission (Punches)	1	2:28
	Kyacey Uscola	def.	Steve Ramirez	TKO (Punches)	1	0:33
	Anthony Ruiz	def.	Shannon Kilgore	KO (Punches)	1	1:05
	Tosh Cook	def.	Eddie Calantas	TKO (Punches)	1	3:49
	Eli Joslin	def.	Aaron Brink	Submission (Guillotine Choke)	1	1:52
	Darren Crisp	def.	Justin Truesdale	Decision (Unanimous)	2	5:00
	Shane Stewart	def.	Frank Megallon	TKO (Punches)	1	2:21
	David Granados	def.	Ben Flores	TKO (Punches)	1	1:29
	Steve Dennison	def.	Ben Davis	Submission (Guillotine Choke)	1	1:44

== KOTC: Unfinished Business ==
KOTC: Unfinished Business was an event held on April 28, 2006, in Sydney, Australia.

=== Results ===
Main Card
Weight class				Method	Round	Time	Notes
	Tony Bonello	def.	Bobby Hoffman	Submission (Strikes)	1	0:00
	Gordon Graff	def.	David Frendin	TKO	2	0:00
	Aaron Ryan	def.	Ali Khanchedar	Submission (Guillotine Choke)	1	0:00
	Steven Lynch	def.	Daniel Collins	Submission (Rear Naked Choke)	0	0:00
	Justin Murray	def.	Adam Bourke	TKO	1	0:00
	James Lee	vs.	Roy Pariente	No Contest	0	0:00
	Roy Pariente	def.	Adrian Leatuna	Submission (Armbar)	1	0:00
	James Lee	def.	Nathan White	Submission (Rear Naked Choke)	1	0:00
	Adam O'Brien	def.	Andrew Molesi	Decision	2	0:00

== KOTC: Predator ==
KOTC: Predator was an event held on May 13, 2006, the Apache Gold Casino in Globe, Arizona.

=== Results ===
Main Card
Weight class				Method	Round	Time	Notes
	Ruben Villareal	vs.	Don Frye	Draw	3	5:00
Bantamweight	Urijah Faber (c)	def.	Charlie Valencia	Submission (Rear-Naked Choke)	1	3:09	(Note: For the King of the Cage Bantamweight Championship.)
	Bobby Hoffman	def.	Paul O'Keefe	Submission (Arm-Triangle Choke)	1	1:29
	Brett Slone	def.	Bryan Pardoe	TKO (Punches)	1	0:40
	Kyacey Uscola	def.	Jacob Chagolla	TKO (Doctor Stoppage)	1	5:00
	Matt Dell	def.	Matt Ver Halen	Decision (Split)	2	5:00
	Ron Rumpf	def.	Shane French	KO (Punch)	1	0:08
	Chad Dietmeyer	def.	Vincent Pérez	Submission (Armbar)	1	1:06
	Bob Calnin	def.	David Carrasco	Submission (Punches)	2	2:50
	Daniel Madrid	def.	Leroy Fornof	Submission (Armbar)	1	4:51
	Justin Bailey	def.	DJ Hollingsworth	Submission (Rear-Naked Choke)	1	1:55

== KOTC: Mangler ==
KOTC: Mangler was an event held on June 9, 2006, at Soboba Casino in San Jacinto, California.

=== Results ===
Main Card
Weight class				Method	Round	Time	Notes
	Thomas Kenney	def.	Bryson Kamaka	TKO (Corner Stoppage)	1	5:00
	Aaron Wetherspoon	def.	Jeremiah Metcalf	Decision (Majority)	2	5:00
	Shawn Bias	def.	Al Garza	TKO	1	1:40
	Chance Williams	def.	Big Will	TKO	1	1:40
	William Sriyapai	def.	Charles Benway	KO	1	1:06
	Jerry Davis	def.	Alan Zunner	TKO	1	4:21
	Elijah Young	def.	Aaron Cruz	Submission (Rear Naked Choke)	1	0:00
	Brian Sesma	def.	Moises Castillo	Submission (Strikes)	1	2:08
	Manny Rodriguez	def.	Adrian Perez	TKO	1	1:43
	Shad Smith	vs.	Richard Montano	Draw	2	5:00
	Brandon Beckering	def.	Brian Savoia	Submission	1	1:22
	Mike Mirelez	def.	Jason Allsman	Submission (Choke)	2	4:29
	Keith McDaniel	def.	Chris Ruyle	TKO (Corner Stoppage)	1	5:00
	Keith Berry	def.	Aiki Cavanaugh	KO	1	0:06
	Ernie Perea	def.	Sambo Blankenship	TKO	1	1:27
	Rubin Taigle	def.	Ron Cushen	TKO	1	4:05
	Clark Bevans	def.	Randy Palmer	Decision (Unanimous)	2	5:00
	Jamie Sandec	def.	Gene Gilsdorf	TKO	2	2:22
	Patrick Nannery	def.	Mark Barelo	TKO (Corner Stoppage)	1	5:00

== KOTC: Australia ==
KOTC: Australia was an event held on July 8, 2006, in Australia.

=== Results ===
Main Card
Weight class				Method	Round	Time	Notes
	Brad Morris	def.	Steve Mckinnon	Decision (Unanimous)	3	5:00
	Charles Bennett	def.	Adam Bourke	Submission (Punches)	2	N/A
	Felise Leniu	def.	Hiriwa Te Rangi	TKO (Cut)	1	N/A
	Gordon Graff	def.	Adrian Leatuna	KO (Punch)	1	N/A

== KOTC: Shoot Out ==
KOTC: Shoot Out was an event held on July 22, 2006, at Tulalip Resort Casino in Seattle, Washington.

== KOTC: Civil War ==
KOTC: Civil War was an event held on July 29, 2006, at Ute Mountain Casino in Towaoc, Colorado.

=== Results ===
Main Card
Weight class				Method	Round	Time	Notes
Middleweight	Joey Villasenor (c)	def.	John Cronk	TKO	1	4:04	(Note: For The King of the Cage Middleweight Championship.)
	Floyd Sword	def.	Jake Paul	TKO	2	3:05
	Joe Padilla	def.	Robert Kelley	TKO	1	0:17
	Mike Terrazas	def.	Keoki Zwicker	Submission (Strikes)	2	1:49
	Rylan Sandoval	def.	Albert Hill	Submission (Rear Naked Choke)	1	3:00
	Jose Lujan	def.	Jericho Valle	KO	2	3:17
	Jason Keith	def.	Gabriel Munoz	Submission (Rear Naked Choke)	1	2:02
	Chris Stranger	vs.	Steve Berlanga	Draw	2	5:00
	Darrell Euler	def.	Josh Peterson	TKO	1	3:09
	Isaque Martinez	def.	Efrem Atene	TKO	1	1:11
	Jeremy Ferguson	def.	Darrell Hackett	Submission (Choke)	2	1:11
	Jeremy Madrid	def.	Terry Alcon	TKO	1	0:42
	Eddie Bortort	def.	Corey Sanford	TKO	1	1:57
	Kaan Clark	def.	Eddie Armendariz	Submission (Armbar)	1	4:04
	Steve Routt	def.	Wes Williams	Submission (Rear Naked Choke)	1	2:30
	Corey Jagger	def.	Gilbert Clark	TKO	1	0:47

== KOTC: Rapid Fire ==
KOTC: Rapid Fire was an event held on August 4, 2006, at Soboba Casino in San Jacinto, California.

=== Results ===
Main Card
Weight class				Method	Round	Time	Notes
Lightweight	Mac Danzig (c)	def.	Buddy Clinton	Decision (Unanimous)	3	5:00	(Note: For the King of the Cage Lightweight Championship.)
Welterweight	Aaron Wetherspoon	def.	Thomas Kenney	KO (Punch)	2	4:54	(Note: For the King of the Cage Welterweight Championship.)
	Manny Tapia	def.	Shad Smith	Decision (Unanimous)	2	5:00
	Akira Shoji	def.	Todd Medina	Decision (Unanimous)	3	5:00
	Nam Phan	def.	Ryan Diaz	Decision (Split)	2	5:00
	James Fanshier	def.	Brian Warren	TKO (Doctor Stoppage)	2	2:30
	Charlie Kohler	def.	Kenneth Tenorio	Submission (Rear-Naked Choke)	1	0:42
	Cub Swanson	def.	Richard Montano	Decision (Unanimous)	2	5:00
	William Sriyapai	def.	Albert Hill	KO (Punch)	2	2:09
	Marcus Nava	def.	John Burgos	TKO (Punches)	1	1:18
	Manny Rodriguez	def.	Brian Sesma	TKO (Punches)	1	4:26
	Shane del Rosario	def.	Gabor Nemeth	TKO (Punches)	1	3:53
	Rudy Duran	def.	Gerry Noche	Decision	2	5:00
	Brandon Bender	def.	Brian Whiteaker	Decision (Unanimous)	2	5:00
	Jesse Taylor	def.	Robert Sarkozi	Decision (Unanimous)	2	5:00
	Daniel Williams	def.	Tim Cree	Submission (Armbar)	1	3:40
	Cody Bollinger	def.	John Colley	TKO (Punches)	1	0:50
	Johnny Vasquez	def.	Donald Sanchez	Submission	2	2:44

== KOTC: Meltdown ==
KOTC: Meltdown was an event held on October 7, 2006, at Murat Theater in Indianapolis.

=== Results ===
Main Card
Weight class				Method	Round	Time	Notes
	Gary Myers	def.	William Clifford	TKO (Punches)	1	2:40
	Jason Gilliam	def.	Darrell Smith	TKO (Punches)	1	4:57
	Julie Kedzie	def.	Jan Finney	Decision (Unanimous)	2	5:00
	Ron Fields	def.	Daniel Sandmann	Decision (Majority)	3	5:00
	Tyler Combs	def.	Matt Jaggers	TKO (Punches)	2	2:59
	Sean McCorkle	def.	Robert Hogan	TKO (Punches)	1	0:30
	Anthony Lapsley	def.	Curt Bee	TKO (Punches)	2	1:34
	Billy Ayash	def.	Shane Pinkerman	Submission (Rear-Naked Choke)	1	0:28
	Joe Kielur	def.	Jeremy Carver	TKO (Punches)	1	2:05
	Elton Chavez	vs.	Justin Robbins	Draw	2	5:00
	Cory Garner	def.	Jimmy Boyd	TKO (Cut)	1	0:34
	Bryan Harper	def.	Rich Weeks	Submission (Rear-Naked Choke)	1	1:16
	Aung La N Sang	def.	Brandon Griffin	Submission (Armbar)	1	0:52
	Myles Jury	def.	Mikey Bennett	Submission (Rear-Naked Choke)	1	1:45

== KOTC: BOOYAA ==
KOTC: BOOYAA was an event held on October 13, 2006, at Soboba Casino in San Jacinto, California.

=== Results ===
Main Card
Weight class				Method	Round	Time	Notes
	Cub Swanson	def.	Charlie Valencia	TKO (Punches)	1	4:52
	Gabe Rivas	def.	Ismael Gonzalez	Submission (Kimura)	2	4:34
	Umar Luv	def.	Casius Aurelius	TKO (Punches)	1	2:49
	Ernie Perea	def.	Albert Hill	Submission (Guillotine)	1	1:47
	Buckley Acosta	def.	Edgar Cruz	Submission (Rear-Naked Choke)	1	0:30
	Ben Beebe	def.	Mike Bourke	TKO (Punches)	1	3:00
	William Sriyapai	def.	Kenneth Tenorio	TKO (Punches)	1	1:36
	Kyle Olsen	def.	Gerry Noche	Submission (Toe Hold)	1	2:52
	Frank Guerrero	def.	Kasey Donovan	Submission	1	1:30
	Georgi Karakhanyan	def.	Brent Wooten	Submission (Guillotine Choke)	2	1:18
	Joe Phebus	def.	Alan Zunner	TKO (Punches)	1	1:19
	Adrian Perez	def.	Josh Lewis	Submission (Neck Crank)	1	1:12
	Chris Reedy	def.	Conrad Miles	TKO (Punches and Elbows)	1	1:15
	Donald Sanchez	def.	Mark Kempthorne	TKO (Punches)	2	4:14
	Rubin Taigle	def.	Brian Savoia	KO (Knee)	1	0:46
	Bill Monsoor	def.	Ricky Cantrell	Submission (Guillotine Choke)	1	0:42
	Robert Dupont	def.	John Delacole	Submission (Rear-Naked Choke)	1	1:10
	David Kiley	def.	Keith McDaniel	Submission (Rear-Naked Choke)	1	1:58

== KOTC: All Stars ==
KOTC: All Stars was an event held on October 28, 2006, at the Reno Events Center in Reno, Nevada.

=== Results ===
Main Card
Weight class				Method	Round	Time	Notes
Bantamweight	Urijah Faber (c)	def.	Bibiano Fernandes	TKO (Doctor Stoppage)	1	4:16	(Note: KOTC: All Stars)
	Kyacey Uscola	def.	Akira Shoji	TKO (Punches)	2	2:23
	A.J. Fonseca	def.	Danny Ailes	Decision (Unanimous)	2	5:00
	Gigo Jara	def.	Khomkrit Niimi	TKO	1	4:55
	Jeremy Freitag	def.	Rolando Torres	Submission (Armbar)	1	2:47
	Ben Sattler	def.	Cody Canterbury	Submission (Rear Naked Choke)	1	2:16
	Jeff Morris	def.	Steven Rivenbark	TKO	1	1:20
	Justin Sampson	def.	Brad Sandaval	KO (Head Kick)	1	3:01

== KOTC: Cyclone ==
KOTC: Cyclone was an event held on November 11, 2006, in Tulsa, Oklahoma.

=== Results ===
Main Card
Weight class				Method	Round	Time	Notes
	Jason Lee	def.	Moises Castillo	Submission (Punches)	2	1:01
	Mikey Bennett	def.	Jared Weise	TKO (Elbows)	2	1:42
	Dewayne Haynes	def.	Ryan Gillman	Submission (Armbar)	1	2:05
	Abel Cullum	def.	John Chester	Submission (Rear-Naked Choke)	2	1:27
	Buddy Clinton	def.	Donald Sanchez	Submission (Rear Naked Choke)	1	2:51
	Gabe Rivas	def.	Melvin Scott	TKO (Punches)	1	1:47
	Jimmy Johnson	def.	Red Cloud Anquoe	Submission (Punches)	1	4:24
	Mark Barrett	def.	Matt Jaggers	Submission (Guillotine Choke)	1	3:24
	Chris Bowles	def.	Kenny Giddens	Submission (Armbar)	1	4:04
	Johnny Hughes	def.	Shane Jackson	TKO (Punches)	1	2:21
	Joe Geromiller	def.	Gabe Morantes	Submission (Rear Naked Choke)	1	3:09

== KOTC: Destroyer ==
KOTC: Destroyer was an event held on December 1, 2006, at Soboba Casino in San Jacinto, California.

=== Results ===
Main Card
Weight class				Method	Round	Time	Notes
	Sean Mccafferty	def.	David Zuniga	Submission (Rear-Naked Choke)	1	0:35
	Ben Beebe	def.	Timothy Mendoza	Decision (Split)	2	5:00
	Michael Sandec	def.	Art Ramirez	TKO (Punches)	1	3:37
	Calvin Bell	def.	Jeremy Ybara	TKO (Punches)	1	3:54
	Sean Loeffler	def.	David Beebe	Submission (Rear-Naked Choke)	1	1:08
Welterweight	Aaron Wetherspoon (c)	def.	Dave Terrel	Decision (Unanimous)	3	5:00	(Note: For the King of the Cage Welterweight Championship.)
	Fernando González	def.	Umar Luv	Submission (Injury)	2	0:28
	Manny Tapia	def.	Richard Montano	TKO (Punches)	3	3:24
	Jared Rollins	def.	Richard Solis	Submission (Armbar)	2	4:59
	Charlie Kohler	def.	Donald Molinas	Submission (Punches)	1	0:47
	Kyle Olsen	def.	Fred Leavy	Submission (Triangle Choke)	1	3:54
	David Kiley	def.	Frank Guerrero	Submission (Armbar)	1	3:36
	Michael Guymon	def.	Josh Ramage	Submission (Triangle Choke)	1	1:52
	Shad Smith	def.	Kei Maeda	TKO (Punches)	1	1:58
	Buckley Acosta	def.	Tim Alberty	Submission (Punches)	1	1:18
	Taylor Schmidt	def.	Dustin Mast	Submission (Verbal)	2	1:09
	John De La O	def.	Adrian Perez	Submission (Armbar)	1	2:52

== See also ==
- List of King of the Cage events
- List of King of the Cage champions
