= Charles Bennett (fighter) =

American mixed martial artist

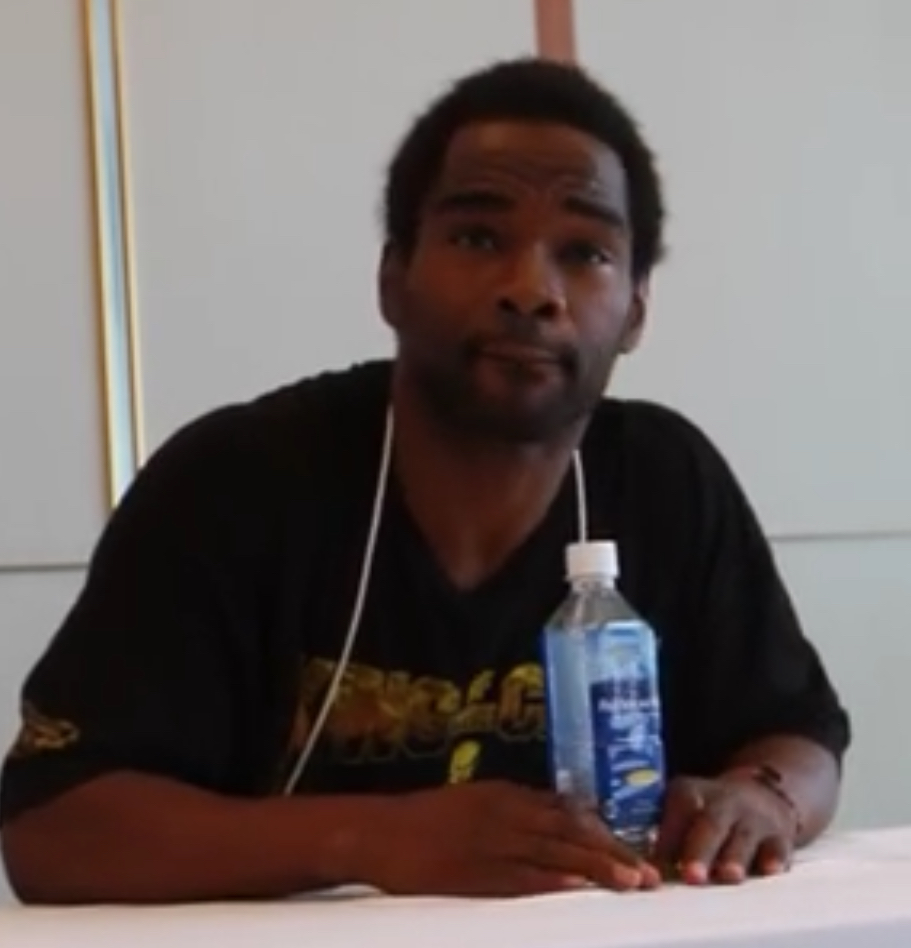
- Bennett in September 2016
- Born: November 23, 1979 (age 46); Gainesville, Florida, United States
- Other names: Felony, Krazy Horse
- Height: 5 ft 5 in (165 cm)
- Weight: 145 lb (66 kg; 10 st 5 lb)
- Division: Welterweight; Lightweight; Featherweight
- Style: MMA, Boxing
- Fighting out of: Ocala, Florida, United States
- Team: FIT/NHB (2008–2013)
- Years active: 1999–present

Mixed martial arts record
- Total: 81
- Wins: 31
- By knockout: 21
- By submission: 7
- By decision: 3
- Losses: 48
- By knockout: 10
- By submission: 27
- By decision: 11
- Draws: 2

Other information
- Mixed martial arts record from Sherdog

Charles Daniel Bennett (born November 23, 1979) is an American mixed martial artist currently competing in the featherweight division of Gamebred Fighting Championship. He is also a bare-knuckle boxer who competes in Bare Knuckle Fighting Championship (BKFC).

Characterized by his explosive fighting style , Bennett has been a professional competitor since 1999, with time spent in PRIDE Fighting Championships, Rizin FF, EliteXC, King of the Cage, World Extreme Fighting, and ShoXC. Although he has never won a championship in MMA, Bennett has gained a cult following among fans.

== Background ==
Bennett was born in Gainesville, Florida, and is the second-oldest boy out of his 11 siblings. He lived in Gainesville for the first eight years of his life before moving to Ocala, Florida to live with his father after his mother was arrested on a drug charge. Bennett had a troubled upbringing as he came from a broken home, often getting into fights, and both of his parents abused crack cocaine.

Growing up, Bennett was a self-described "black sheep" of the family, but was very athletic and was a talented football player in high school, where he played running back, linebacker, and was even a defensive lineman despite his small stature. However, Bennett was kicked off of the team during his sophomore year. During his junior year, his father kicked him out of the house. Bennett eventually dropped out of high school, and turned his attention to selling narcotics.

In between jail stints, he found a newspaper advertisement for a mixed martial arts gym in Ocala, and decided to sign up and join the gym. His coaches were very impressed with his speed and strength, but at the time, Bennett was still dealing drugs. Eventually, Bennett stopped selling narcotics, and focused on mixed martial arts, motivated by the birth of his first child to change his lifestyle—although he continued to be arrested on drug charges until 2011. Bennett also credits King of the Cage owner Terry Trebilcock Jr. in helping turn his life around.

== Mixed martial arts career ==
=== Early career ===
In September 1999 and at only 19 years old, Bennett made his professional debut on a regional promotion in Atlanta, Georgia, competing in the lightweight weight class, where he lost to John Swift via submission. In his next bout a year later, he received his first professional win after he knocked out Todd Carney with a slam in the first round at the New Blood Conflict event for World Extreme Fighting. In Bennett's second WEF bout, he lost to Rich Clementi after tapping out to strikes in the first round. Bennett won his next two fights via strikes, before making his King of the Cage debut at KOTC 10 against Duane Ludwig. Bennett lost after he submitted due to exhaustion in the second round. Bennett then won 9 of his next 10 fights, including a win over former U.S. Marine Gerald Strebendt via submission due to strikes. His four-fight winning streak was snapped by future Pancrase Featherweight Champion Takumi Nakayama via submission.

=== Pride Fighting Championship and King of the Cage ===
With a record of 12-5, Bennett signed with Japanese promotion Pride Fighting Championships, making his promotional debut against Takanori Gomi at Pride FC: Bushido 5 on October 14, 2004, in what was also Bennett's overseas debut. Bennett lost via kimura within the first round. After a return to King of the Cage in which he achieved mixed results, Bennett returned to Pride at Pride FC: Bushido 7 on May 22, 2005, defeating Yoshiro Maeda via knockout just under two minutes in the first round.

On September 25, Bennett made his next appearance for the promotion at Pride FC: Bushido 9, losing a bout to Dokonjonosuke Mishima by submission in the first round. After failing to capture the King of the Cage Bantamweight Championship fight against future WEC Featherweight Champion Urijah Faber, Bennett fought at Pride FC: Shockwave 2005 against Japanese fighter Ken Kaneko, and won via armbar submission. After winning the bout, Bennett tackled the referee, who in response pulled out a yellow card.

After his bout with Kaneko, Bennett was involved in a backstage altercation with Cristiano Marcello, a member of the Chute Boxe Academy. In a video posted on Chute Boxe's official website, Bennett is seen attacking Marcello. Bennett supposedly insulted the Chute Boxe Academy and Wanderlei Silva, prompting a scuffle between Marcello and Bennett. Bennett charged at Marcello while throwing punches, and both men went to the ground, where Marcello put Bennett to sleep with a triangle choke before the fight was broken up. After becoming conscious, Bennett knocked Wanderlei Silva unconscious.

On June 4, 2006, Bennett made his last appearance for the organization in at Pride FC: Bushido 11 against Tatsuya Kawajiri. Bennett lost the bout via kneebar submission in the first round. He held a record of 2-3 with the promotion.

=== EliteXC ===
On February 10, 2007, Bennett made his debut for EliteXC, at the company's inaugural event EliteXC: Destiny against K. J. Noons. Bennett defeated Noons via knockout in an upset.

=== Later career and other ventures ===
In 2004, Bennett, along with fighters Din Thomas and Aaron Riley, appeared in the Chris Fuller film Loren Cass.

In September 2010, Bennett showed up at the tryouts for The Ultimate Fighter: Team GSP vs. Team Koscheck, but did not make it to the final cast.

=== Return to MMA ===
In October 2015, after being away from the sport for nearly three years, Bennett returned to active MMA competition for his former organization, King of the Cage. Bennett fought six times in the next eleven months, and posted a record of four wins and two losses.

In September 2016, Bennett made an appearance for Rizin Fighting Federation, and competed in the featherweight division. He defeated Minoru Kimura by technical knockout in 7 seconds of the first round at the Rizin World Grand Prix 2016: 1st Round. After the fight, Bennett called out long-time rival Wanderlei Silva in an attempt to fight him, which did not occur. The callout later went viral on the internet due to Bennetts erratic nature, calling Silva 'Candylei' and ending it by saying that he 'could run fast', along with using a racial slur to describe himself.

=== Fight Circus ===
On September 29, 2024, Bennet competed in Full Metal Dojo's Fight Circus 8 main event in Phuket, Thailand. He fought in a special rules 2-on-1 MMA match against Thai fighters "Bank" and "No Money". The Thai fighters won the match by submitting Bennet via rear naked choke.

== Bare-knuckle fighting ==
=== Bare Knuckle Fighting Championship ===
On August 25, 2018, Bennett faced Michael McDonald at BKFC 2. He lost the fight via TKO in the 4th round with 10 seconds left.

Bennett made his sophomore appearance in the sport against Johnny Bedford at BKFC 9 on November 16, 2019. He lost the fight via second-round technical knockout due to a hand injury.

He then faced Tyler Goodjohn at BKFC 15 on December 11, 2020, losing the fight via unanimous decision.

Bennett faced Pat Sullivan on February 7, 2026, at BKFC Knucklemania VI. He won by technical knockout at the end of the second round.

Bennett faced Toby Misech on April 11, 2026, at BKFC Fight Night 36. He lost the fight by unanimous decision.

Bennett faced Bryan Duran on September 11, 2026 at BKFC 93. He lost by decision.

=== Gamebred Fighting Championship ===
On June 18, 2021, Bennett faced Jason Knight for the main event of Jorge Masvidal's Gamebred Fighting Championship (GFC), a typical MMA bout but contested bare-knuckle style. Bennett knocked down Knight early, and opened up a cut on his face, but would be taken down and submitted with a rear-naked choke in round one.

On October 1, 2021, Bennett faced Rob Emerson in the co-main event of Gambred FC 2. He lost by knockout with 24 seconds left in the first round.

After losing to Ramon Taveras at Combat Night Pro event, Bennett then faced Keith Speed at Gamebred FC 4 on May 5, 2023. He lost the bout via third-round submission.

Bennett faced Joe Penafiel at Gamebred Bareknuckle MMA 7 on March 2, 2024, and lost by technical knockout in the third round.

== Other ventures ==
=== Misfits Boxing ===
On September 26, 2026, during the broadcast of Henry Cejudo vs. Javon Walton, Bennett made an appearances after influencer FoxTheG defeated bare-knuckle boxer Justin Ibarrola. On October 8, Misfits Boxing announced that Bennett would have a Survivor Tag boxing match on the Joey Essex vs. Dapper Laughs undercard as a last minute addition. His opponents included Lil Cracra, Joey Knight and Andy Howson. However, the bout was cancelled on October 9, one day before the bout and Bennett was replaced by Tolbzter, but was ultimately changed to just three fighters on the night.

On November 15, Misfits Boxing announced that Barnett would make his professional boxing debut against FoxTheG for the MFB lightweight title on the Chase DeMoor vs. Andrei Arlovski undercard. The bout is scheduled to take place on December 18 at the Nashville Auditorium in Nashville, Tennessee, U.S.

== Legal troubles ==
Between 1999 and 2009, he was arrested 14 times on charges that included: selling cocaine, burglary, aggravated battery on a pregnant woman, and possession of MDMA. The charge of aggravated battery on a pregnant woman relating to an incident from 2002 was dropped; he was found guilty on two drug charges in 2000 and 2001, and was also found guilty of another aggravated battery in 2008, which stemmed from a domestic dispute.

On January 16, 2011, Bennett was training at a gym in Bernalillo County, New Mexico, and got into a physical altercation with a teammate. According to a police report, tempers flared between the two, and the other fighter knocked down Bennett, who then got dressed and left the building. However, Bennett unexpectedly returned 15 minutes later armed with a heavy piece of steel, and attacked the fighter from behind. He was charged with aggravated battery.

In 2013, he was again arrested for battery.

== Personal life ==
Bennett is divorced and has two children.

== Mixed martial arts record ==
Professional record breakdown
81 matches	31 wins	48 losses
By knockout	21	10
By submission	7	27
By decision	3	11
Draws	2	

Res.	Record	Opponent	Method	Event	Date	Round	Time	Location	Notes
Loss	31–48–2	Cam Teague	Submission (rear-naked choke)	Island Fights 97	May 22, 2026	1	2:32	Biloxi, Mississippi, United States	Return to Lightweight.
Loss	31–47–2	Cameron Bennett	Submission (rear-naked choke)	Island Fights 90	July 25, 2025	2	1:22	Biloxi, Mississippi, United States	
Win	31–46–2	Justin Howard	Submission (rear-naked choke)	Island Fights 84	August 9, 2024	2	0:57	Pensacola, Florida, United States	
Loss	30–46–2	Joe Penafiel	TKO (punches)	Gamebred Bareknuckle MMA 7	March 2, 2024	3	3:49	Orlando, Florida, United States	Return to Featherweight. Bare knuckle MMA.
Loss	30–45–2	Keith Speed	Submission (rear-naked choke)	Gamebred Bareknuckle MMA 4	May 5, 2023	3	4:22	Fort Lauderdale, Florida, United States	Bare Knuckle MMA.
Loss	30–44–2	Ramon Taveras	TKO	Combat Night Pro 20	March 4, 2023	1	2:10	Orlando, Florida, United States	
Loss	30–43–2	Rob Emerson	KO (punches)	Gamebred Bareknuckle MMA 2	October 1, 2021	1	4:36	Biloxi, Mississippi, United States	Bare Knuckle MMA.
Loss	30–42–2	Jason Knight	Submission (rear-naked choke)	Gamebred Bareknuckle MMA 1	June 19, 2021	1	2:15	Biloxi, Mississippi, United States	Bare Knuckle MMA.
Loss	30–41–2	Kevin Croom	Submission (rear-naked choke)	FAC 1	August 24, 2019	1	2:15	Independence, Missouri, United States	
Loss	30–40–2	Zach Shaw	Submission (rear-naked choke)	Total Warrior Combat: Bennett vs. Shaw	December 1, 2018	1	3:29	Lansing, Michigan, United States	
Loss	30–39–2	James Freeman	Technical Submission (rear-naked choke)	Island Fights 48	June 2, 2018	2	0:44	Pensacola, Florida, United States	
Loss	30–38–2	Bruce Lutchmedial	Decision (unanimous)	CamSoda Legends 1	April 26, 2018	3	5:00	Fort Lauderdale, Florida, United States	Featherweight bout.
Loss	30–37–2	Brok Weaver	Decision (split)	Island Fights 46	February 8, 2018	3	5:00	Pensacola, Florida, United States	
Loss	30–36–2	Cody Pfister	Submission (rear naked choke)	Fist Fight League: Fight Night 2	September 30, 2017	1	2:36	Amarillo, Texas, United States	Return to Lightweight. For the inaugural FFL Lightweight Championship.
Loss	30–35–2	Ray Cooper III	KO (punches)	X-1 World Events 48	August 12, 2017	2	2:48	Honolulu, Hawaii, United States	For the X-1 Welterweight Championship.
Loss	30–34–2	Balajin	Submission (rear-naked choke)	Kunlun Fight MMA 13	July 6, 2017	2	0:55	Qingdao, China	
Loss	30–33–2	Lu Zhenhong	TKO (corner stoppage)	Kunlun Fight MMA 11	May 4, 2017	1	5:00	Jining, China	
Loss	30–32–2	Cody Stevens	Decision (unanimous)	Revelation Fight Organization: Big Guns 23	March 24, 2017	3	5:00	Cleveland, Ohio, United States	
Loss	30–31–2	Lawrence Fitzpatrick	Submission (rear-naked choke)	Tanko FC 3	February 11, 2017	1	4:42	Manchester, England	Lightweight bout.
Win	30–30–2	Minoru Kimura	TKO (punches)	Rizin World Grand Prix 2016: 1st Round	September 25, 2016	1	0:07	Saitama, Japan	
Win	29–30–2	Paul Rodriguez	Submission (heel hook)	Battleground: Perry vs. Mundell	May 14, 2016	1	0:43	Kissimmee, Florida, United States	Lightweight bout; Bennett missed weight (159 lb).
Loss	28–30–2	Matt DiMarcantonio	Decision (unanimous)	KOTC: Extreme Horsepower	March 12, 2016	3	5:00	Niagara Falls, New York, United States	
Win	28–29–2	Terrell Hobbs	Submission (heel hook)	Elite Warrior Challenge 9	February 4, 2016	1	1:17	Salem, Virginia, United States	Catchweight (150 lb) bout.
Loss	27–29–2	Jimmy Zidek	Decision (split)	KOTC: Thunder & Lightning	January 8, 2016	3	5:00	Carlton, Minnesota, United States	
Win	27–28–2	Danny Black	KO (punches)	KOTC: Harvest of Champions	October 24, 2015	1	1:41	Sloan, Iowa, United States	Catchweight (150 lb) bout.
Loss	26–28–2	Ronnie Rogers	Submission (triangle choke)	Warfare FC 7	December 7, 2012	1	3:45	Myrtle Beach, South Carolina, United States	
Loss	26–27–2	Johnavan Vistante	Decision (unanimous)	Destiny MMA: Na'Koa	September 8, 2012	5	5:00	Honolulu, Hawaii, United States	For the Destiny MMA Lightweight Championship.
Loss	26–26–2	Chris McDaniel	Submission (triangle choke)	ShoFight 20	June 16, 2012	1	2:52	Springfield, Missouri, United States	Catchweight (150 lb) bout.
Win	26–25–2	John Mahlow	TKO (punches)	Art of Fighting 15	May 15, 2012	1	3:23	Jacksonville, Florida, United States	Lightweight bout.
Loss	25–25–2	Peter Grimes	Submission (guillotine choke)	CFA 6	April 13, 2012	2	3:36	Miami, Florida, United States	
Loss	25–24–2	Luis Palomino	KO (punch)	CFA 4	December 17, 2011	1	3:59	Coral Gables, Florida, United States	Lightweight bout.
Win	25–23–2	Michael Casteel	TKO (slam and punches)	KOTC: Rising Sun	September 10, 2011	1	0:56	Santa Fe, New Mexico, United States	
Loss	24–23–2	Matt Muramoto	Submission (rear-naked choke)	KOTC: Shockwave	July 23, 2011	1	2:48	Oroville, California, United States	Featherweight debut.
Loss	24–22–2	Jason Gybels	Submission (rear-naked choke)	United Combat Sports: Caged Combat 3	April 16, 2011	3	4:14	Grand Ronde, Oregon, United States	
Loss	24–21–2	John Harris	Decision (split)	Hess Extreme Fighting 1	March 15, 2011	3	5:00	Panama City Beach, Florida, United States	
Loss	24–20–2	Fábio Mello	Decision (split)	World Extreme Fighting 45	January 22, 2011	3	5:00	Jacksonville, Florida, United States	
Loss	24–19–2	Drew Fickett	Submission (guillotine choke)	Shine Fights 3	September 10, 2010	1	3:34	Newkirk, Oklahoma, United States	
Win	24–18–2	Harris Norwood	Submission (guillotine choke)	World Extreme Fighting: Lee vs. Moore	July 10, 2010	2	4:55	Kissimmee, Florida, United States	
Loss	23–18–2	Sterling Ford	Decision (unanimous)	Action Fight League: Rock-N-Rumble 3	June 4, 2010	3	5:00	Hollywood, Florida, United States	
Loss	23–17–2	Bobby Green	KO (punches)	KOTC: Fight For Hope	December 17, 2009	1	2:17	San Bernardino, California, United States	
Win	23–16–2	Eric Moon	KO (punches)	KOTC: Super Stars	August 13, 2009	1	3:32	Highland, California, United States	
Loss	22–16–2	Anthony McDavitt	Decision (split)	KOTC: Legends	June 6, 2009	3	3:00	Winterhaven, California, United States	
Win	22–15–2	Donnie Martinez	Submission (guillotine choke)	KOTC: Hierarchy	October 13, 2007	1	1:39	Albuquerque, New Mexico, United States	
Loss	21–15–2	Victor Valenzuela	TKO (submission to punches)	ShoXC: Elite Challenger Series	August 25, 2007	1	3:23	Vicksburg, Mississippi, United States	
Win	21–14–2	Dan Loman	KO (punch)	KOTC: Battle at the Bowl	July 21, 2007	2	3:15	Wisconsin, United States	
Win	20–14–2	Robert Martz	KO (slam)	KOTC: Caged Chaos	March 10, 2007	1	0:29	Laughlin, Nevada, United States	
Win	19–14–2	K. J. Noons	KO (punch)	EliteXC: Destiny	February 10, 2007	1	3:43	Southaven, Mississippi, United States	
Win	18–14–2	Adam Bourke	TKO (submission to punches)	KOTC: Warpath	July 8, 2006	2	N/A	Penrith, Australia	
Loss	17–14–2	Tatsuya Kawajiri	Submission (kneebar)	Pride Bushido 11	June 4, 2006	1	2:30	Saitama, Japan	
Loss	17–13–2	Buddy Clinton	Submission (rear-naked choke)	KOTC: Drop Zone	March 18, 2006	1	0:18	Mount Pleasant, Michigan, United States	
Loss	17–12–2	Jeff Curran	Submission (armbar)	KOTC: Redemption on the River	February 17, 2006	1	4:32	Moline, Illinois, United States	
Win	17–11–2	Ken Kaneko	Submission (armbar)	Pride Shockwave 2005	December 31, 2005	1	4:14	Saitama, Japan	
Loss	16–11–2	Urijah Faber	Technical Submission (rear-naked choke)	Gladiator Challenge 46	December 11, 2005	1	4:38	Coarsegold, California, United States	For the KOTC Bantamweight Championship.
Loss	16–10–2	Dokonjonosuke Mishima	Submission (ankle lock)	PRIDE Bushido 9	September 25, 2005	1	4:04	Tokyo, Japan	2005 Pride Lightweight Grand Prix Alternate bout.
Loss	16–9–2	John Gunderson	Submission (rear-naked choke)	Gladiator Challenge 40	August 13, 2005	2	1:28	Bend, Oregon, United States	
Draw	16–8–2	Victor Valenzuela	Draw (unanimous)	KOTC: Prime Time	August 5, 2005	2	5:00	San Jacinto, California, United States	
Win	16–8–1	Gabe Rivas	TKO (thumb injury)	KOTC: Caliente	July 9, 2005	1	2:21	San Carlos, Arizona, United States	
Win	15–8–1	Theo McDonald	TKO (punches)	KOTC: Grudge Match	June 17, 2005	1	4:40	Albuquerque, New Mexico, United States	
Win	14–8–1	Yoshiro Maeda	KO (punch)	Pride Bushido 7	May 22, 2005	1	1:55	Tokyo, Japan	
Draw	13–8–1	Gabe Rivas	Draw (unanimous)	KOTC: Soboba	March 20, 2005	2	5:00	San Jacinto, California, United States	Return to Lightweight.
Loss	13–8	Forrest Petz	Submission (arm-triangle choke)	KOTC: Payback	February 25, 2005	1	3:40	Cleveland, Ohio, United States	Welterweight debut.
Win	13–7	Victor Hernandez	KO (slam)	KOTC: Uprising	February 5, 2005	1	0:11	Albuquerque, New Mexico, United States	
Loss	12–7	Dave Hisquierdo	Submission (arm-triangle choke)	KOTC: Revenge	November 14, 2004	2	1:56	San Jacinto, California, United States	
Loss	12–6	Takanori Gomi	Submission (kimura)	Pride Bushido 5	October 14, 2004	1	5:52	Osaka, Japan	
Loss	12–5	Takumi Nakayama	Submission (rear-naked choke)	KOTC: Hitmaster	August 6, 2004	1	2:46	San Jacinto, California, United States	
Win	12–4	William Sriyrapai	Decision (unanimous)	KOTC: Unfinished Business	June 12, 2004	2	5:00	San Jacinto, California, United States	
Win	11–4	Shad Smith	KO (punches)	KOTC: After Shock	February 20, 2004	1	0:40	San Jacinto, California, United States	
Win	10–4	Glen Mincer	KO (punches)	World Extreme Fighting	December 20, 2003	1	2:08	Orlando, Florida, United States	
Win	9–4	William Sriyrapai	Decision (split)	KOTC: Renegades	September 5, 2003	2	5:00	San Jacinto, California, United States	
Loss	8–4	Rick Davis	Decision (unanimous)	World Extreme FC 1	June 29, 2002	4	4:00	Marietta, Georgia, United States	
Win	8–3	Aristides Britto	Submission (heel hook)	Dixie Rumble 1	November 17, 2001	1	3:09	United States	
Win	7–3	Scott Johnson	TKO (punches)	Rumble in the Valley 1	November 15, 2001	1	2:00	Ocala, Florida, United States	
Win	6–3	Gerald Strebendt	TKO (submission to punches)	Gladiator Challenge 7	November 4, 2001	1	1:40	Colusa, California, United States	
Win	5–3	Jon Weidler	Decision (majority)	Reality Super Fighting 5	October 27, 2001	3	4:00	Augusta, Georgia, United States	
Win	4–3	Todd Carney	KO (punches)	Reality Super Fighting 4	September 22, 2001	1	N/A	Savannah, Georgia, United States	
Loss	3–3	Duane Ludwig	TKO (exhaustion)	KOTC: Critical Mass	August 4, 2001	2	2:38	San Jacinto, California, United States	
Win	3–2	John Wehbey	TKO (corner stoppage)	Reality Super Fighting: Circle of Truth 1	April 7, 2001	3	1:12	Savannah, Georgia, United States	
Win	2–2	Robert Irizarry	TKO (submission to punches)	World Extreme Fighting: Rumble at the Rodeo 2	March 17, 2001	3	1:43	Kissimmee, Florida, United States	
Loss	1–2	Rich Clementi	TKO (submission to punches)	World Extreme Fighting: Rumble at the Rodeo 1	December 16, 2000	1	N/A	N/A	
Win	1–1	Todd Carney	KO (slam)	World Extreme Fighting: New Blood Conflict	August 26, 2000	1	2:21	N/A	
Loss	0–1	John Swift	Submission (rear-naked choke)	Lionheart Invitational 1	September 1, 1999	1	12:46	Atlanta, Georgia, United States	

== Bare knuckle record ==
Professional record breakdown
6 matches	1 win	5 losses
By knockout	1	2
By decision	0	3

Res.	Record	Opponent	Method	Event	Date	Round	Time	Location	Notes
Loss	1–5	Bryan Duran	Decision (unanimous)	BKFC 93	September 11, 2026	5	5:00	Hollywood, Florida, United States	
Loss	1–4	Toby Misech	Decision (unanimous)	BKFC Fight Night Honolulu: Pitolo vs. Coltrane	April 11, 2026	5	5:00	Honolulu, Hawaii, United States	
Win	1–3	Pat Sullivan	TKO (punches)	BKFC Knucklemania VI	February 7, 2026	2	1:56	Philadelphia, Pennsylvania, United States	
Loss	0–3	Tyler Goodjohn	Decision (unanimous)	BKFC 15	December 11, 2020	5	2:00	Biloxi, Mississippi, United States	
Loss	0–2	Johnny Bedford	TKO (hand injury)	BKFC 9	November 16, 2019	2	2:00	Biloxi, Mississippi, United States	
Loss	0–1	Michael McDonald	TKO (hand injury)	BKFC 2	August 25, 2018	4	1:49	Biloxi, Mississippi, United States	

== Fight Circus record ==
0 win (0 TKO), 1 loss
Result	Record	Opponent	Method	Event	Date	Round	Time	Location	Notes
Loss	0–1	Bank & No Money	Submission (rear-naked choke)	Fight Circus 8: Running Man the Musical	September 29, 2024			Phuket, Thailand	2-on-1 MMA
Legend Win Loss Draw/No contest

== Survivor Tag boxing record ==
0 fights	0 wins	0 losses

No.	Result	Record	Opponents	Type	Round, time	Date	Location	Notes
1	Upcoming		Lil Cracra	—N/a	—N/a	10 Oct 2026	Copper Box Arena, London, England	
1	Upcoming		Joey Knight	—N/a	—N/a	10 Oct 2026	Copper Box Arena, London, England	
1	Upcoming		Andy Howson	—N/a	—N/a	10 Oct 2026	Copper Box Arena, London, England	

== See also ==
- List of male mixed martial artists
