= Mescalero Apache Schools =

Tribal school in New Mexico, USA

Coordinates: 33.2254°N 105.7429°W

Mescalero Apache Schools (MAS), also known as Mescalero Apache School, is a tribal K-12 school in unincorporated Otero County, New Mexico, associated with the Bureau of Indian Education (BIE). It is of the Mescalero Apache tribe.

It is outside of the Mescalero census-designated place although it has a Mescalero post office address.

In 2011 it had about 500 students.

== History ==
In 1954 the tribe asked for the school to be placed in the Otero County school system.

By 2009 there was an epidemic of suicides among young people on the reservation. By September 2009, Mescalero Apache School established a suicide crisis center. Additionally the U.S. Department of Education in 2010 gave the school $48,000 for suicide prevention programs.

== Curriculum ==
Every student in elementary and middle school must take classes in the Apache language, and every high school student must take at least one year of Apache language classes. In the early 1990s the school introduced Apache language classes.
