= Mescalero, New Mexico =

- Census-designated place
- Location of Mescalero, New Mexico

- Location in the United States Mescalero (the United States)
- Coordinates: 33°08′10″N 105°47′20″W
- Country: United States
- State: New Mexico
- County: Otero

Area
  - Total: 17.90 sq mi (46.36 km^{2})
  - Land: 17.89 sq mi (46.33 km^{2})
  - Water: 0.012 sq mi (0.03 km^{2})
- Elevation: 7,425 ft (2,263 m)

Population (2020)
  - Total: 1,480
  - Density: 82.8/sq mi (31.95/km^{2})
- Time zone: UTC-7 (Mountain (MST))
  - Summer (DST): UTC-6 (MDT)
- ZIP code: 88340
- Area code: 575
- FIPS code: 35-47920
- GNIS feature ID: 2408821

Mescalero (Mescalero-Chiricahua: Mashgal) is a census-designated place (CDP) in Otero County, New Mexico, United States, located on the Mescalero Apache Reservation. As of the 2020 census, Mescalero had a population of 1,480.

== History ==
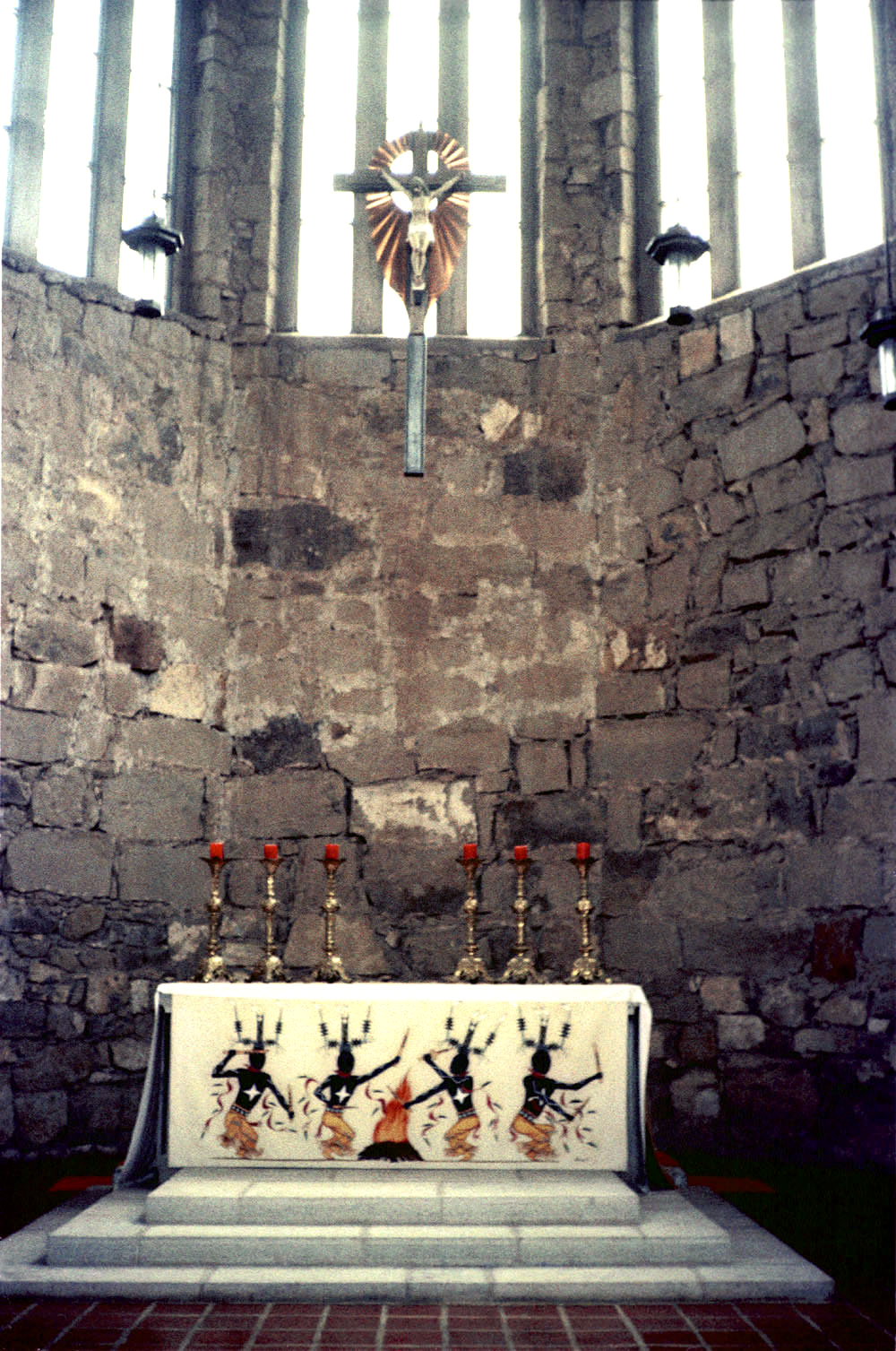
St. Joseph's Catholic Church, Mescalero 1975

The settlement was originally called Blazer's Mill, the location of a famous gunfight during the Lincoln County War.

== Geography ==
According to the United States Census Bureau, the CDP has a total area of 17.9 square miles (46 km^{2}) 17.9 square miles (46.3 km^{2}), all land.

== Demographics ==
Historical population
Census	Pop.	Note	%±
2020	1,480		—
U.S. Decennial Census

As of the census of 2010, there were 1,338 people, 404 households, and 283 families residing in the CDP. The population density was 68.9 inhabitants per square mile (26.6/km^{2}). There were 373 housing units at an average density of 20.9 per square mile (8.1/km^{2}). The racial makeup of the CDP was 4.06% White, 0.16% African American, 90.59% Native American, 0.08% Asian, 0.08% Pacific Islander, 2.27% from other races, and 2.76% from two or more races. Hispanic or Latino of any race were 8.68% of the population.

There were 351 households, out of which 49.9% had children under the age of 18 living with them, 40.5% were married couples living together, 33.3% had a female householder with no husband present, and 20.2% were non-families. 16.2% of all households were made up of individuals, and 2.8% had someone living alone who was 65 years of age or older. The average household size was 3.50 and the average family size was 3.88.

In the CDP, the population was spread out, with 38.4% under the age of 18, 12.0% from 18 to 24, 28.8% from 25 to 44, 16.3% from 45 to 64, and 4.5% who were 65 years of age or older. The median age was 25 years. For every 100 females, there were 93.9 males. For every 100 females age 18 and over, there were 88.8 males.

The median income for a household in the CDP was $22,353, and the median income for a family was $22,969. Males had a median income of $23,125 versus $20,573 for females. The per capita income for the CDP was $8,554. About 34.5% of families and 39.0% of the population were below the poverty line, including 40.7% of those under age 18 and 34.0% of those age 65 or over.

== Education ==
Mescalero Apache Schools is a tribal K-12 school associated with the Bureau of Indian Education (BIE). It is outside of the Mescalero CDP although it has a Mescalero post office address.

Tularosa Municipal Schools is the local school district.

== See also ==
- List of census-designated places in New Mexico
