= List of KOTC events =

This is a list of events held and scheduled by King of the Cage (KOTC), a mixed martial arts organization based primarily in the United States, but which holds branded events worldwide. The first event, Bas Rutten's King of the Cage, took place on October 30, 1999. All events are confirmed by Sherdog.

== Scheduled events ==
#	Event title	Date	Arena	Location
624	KOTC: Warborn	August 15, 2026	Chinook Winds Casino	Lincoln City, Oregon, USA
625	KOTC: Silver Legacy	August 22, 2026	Silver Legacy Resort Casino	Reno, Nevada, USA

== Past events ==
#	Event title	Date	Arena	Location
623	KOTC: Final Option	May 28, 2026	Grand Hyatt Indian Wells Resort & Villas	Indian Wells, California, USA
622	KOTC: Future Legends 67	May 16, 2026	Silver Legacy Resort Casino	Reno, Nevada, USA
621	KOTC: Warranted Aggression	May 14, 2026	Coeur d'Alene Casino	Worley, Idaho, USA
620	KOTC: Strike Zone 2	April 18, 2026	San Manuel Stadium	San Bernardino, California, USA
619	KOTC: Future Legends 66	February 14, 2026	Silver Legacy Resort Casino	Reno, Nevada, USA
618	KOTC: Rise of the Warriors	February 5, 2026	Coeur d'Alene Casino	Worley, Idaho, USA
617	KOTC: Future Legends 65	November 8, 2025	Silver Legacy Resort Casino	Reno, Nevada, USA
616	KOTC: Strike Zone	October 25, 2025	Chinook Winds Casino	Lincoln City, Oregon, USA
615	KOTC: JRP	October 4, 2025	San Manuel Stadium	San Bernardino, California, USA
614	KOTC: Class Action	September 25, 2025	Coeur d'Alene Casino	Worley, Idaho, USA
613	KOTC: Apocalypse	August 16, 2025	Chinook Winds Casino	Lincoln City, Oregon, USA
612	KOTC: Future Legends 64	August 2, 2025	Silver Legacy Resort Casino	Reno, Nevada, USA
611	KOTC: Violent Justice	May 31, 2025	San Manuel Stadium	San Bernardino, California, USA
610	KOTC: Restitution	May 17, 2025	Chinook Winds Casino	Lincoln City, Oregon, USA
609	KOTC: Future Legends 63	May 10, 2025	Silver Legacy Resort Casino	Reno, Nevada, USA
608	KOTC: No Loose Ends	April 10, 2025	Coeur d'Alene Casino	Worley, Idaho, USA
607	KOTC: Future Legends 62	February 15, 2025	Silver Legacy Resort Casino	Reno, Nevada, USA
606	KOTC: Super Brawl	February 8, 2025	Chinook Winds Casino	Lincoln City, Oregon, USA
605	KOTC: Future Legends 61	November 16, 2024	Silver Legacy Resort Casino	Reno, Nevada, USA
604	KOTC: Clash of Champions	November 2, 2024	Chinook Winds Casino	Lincoln City, Oregon, USA
603	KOTC: Forged Steel	October 19, 2024	Segra Stadium	Fayetteville, North Carolina, USA
602	KOTC: Havoc	October 10, 2024	Coeur d'Alene Casino	Worley, Idaho, USA
601	KOTC: Line of Fire	October 5, 2024	San Manuel Stadium	San Bernardino, California, USA
600	KOTC: Attack Point	September 7, 2024	Chinook Winds Casino	Lincoln City, Oregon, USA
599	KOTC: Future Legends 60	August 3, 2024	Silver Legacy Resort Casino	Reno, Nevada, USA
598	KOTC: Twilight	July 27, 2024	Chinook Winds Casino	Lincoln City, Oregon, USA
597	KOTC: Clash	June 13, 2024	Coeur d'Alene Casino	Worley, Idaho, USA
596	KOTC: Comeback	June 1, 2024	San Manuel Stadium	San Bernardino, California, USA
595	KOTC: Future Legends 59	May 11, 2024	Silver Legacy Resort Casino	Reno, Nevada, USA
594	KOTC: Future Legends 58	February 24, 2024	Silver Legacy Resort Casino	Reno, Nevada, USA
593	KOTC: Future Legends 57	February 15, 2024	Coeur d'Alene Casino	Worley, Idaho, USA
592	KOTC: Grudge Match	February 10, 2024	Chinook Winds Casino	Lincoln City, Oregon, USA
591	KOTC: Future Legends 56	November 11, 2023	Silver Legacy Resort Casino	Reno, Nevada, USA
590	KOTC: Destroy	October 7, 2023	Gold Country Casino	Oroville, California, USA
589	KOTC: Oceanside	September 30, 2023	Chinook Winds Casino	Lincoln City, Oregon, USA
588	KOTC: Rage	September 14, 2023	Coeur d'Alene Casino	Worley, Idaho, USA
587	KOTC: Future Legends 55	August 12, 2023	Silver Legacy Resort Casino	Reno, Nevada, USA
586	KOTC: Coastal Brawl	July 22, 2023	Chinook Winds Casino Resort	Lincoln City, Oregon, USA
585	KOTC: Summer Battle	June 17, 2023	Gold Country Casino	Oroville, California, USA
584	KOTC: Future Legends 54	May 20, 2023	Silver Legacy Resort Casino	Reno, Nevada, USA
583	KOTC: Knockout 2	Apr. 13, 2023	Coeur d'Alene Casino	Worley, Idaho, USA
582	KOTC: Future Legends 53	Feb. 25, 2023	Silver Legacy Resort Casino	Reno, Nevada, USA
581	KOTC: Coastline	Feb. 11, 2023	Chinook Winds Casino Resort	Lincoln City, Oregon, USA
580	KOTC: Slammed Down	Jan. 7, 2023	Gold Country Casino	Oroville, California, USA
579	KOTC: Future Legends 52	Nov. 19, 2022	Silver Legacy Resort Casino	Reno, Nevada, USA
578	KOTC: Enraged	Oct. 22, 2022	Harrah's Casino	Laughlin, Nevada, USA
577	KOTC: Split Second	Oct. 1, 2022	Chinook Winds Casino	Lincoln City, Oregon, USA
576	KOTC: Super Charged	Sept. 8, 2022	Coeur d'Alene Casino	Worley, Idaho, USA
575	KOTC: Future Legends 51	Aug. 27, 2022	Silver Legacy Casino	Reno, Nevada, USA
574	KOTC: Sandstorm	July 23, 2022	Chinook Winds Casino Resort	Lincoln City, Oregon, USA
573	KOTC: Destroyer 2	June 18, 2022	Gold Country Casino Resort	Oroville, California, USA
572	KOTC: Future Legends 50	June 4, 2022	Silver Legacy Resort Casino	Reno, Nevada, USA
571	KOTC: Recharge	March 31, 2022	Coeur D'Alene Casino, Resort and Hotel	Worley, Idaho, USA
570	KOTC: Future Legends 49	Feb. 26, 2022	Silver Legacy Resort Casino	Reno, Nevada, USA
569	KOTC: Firestorm 2	Jan. 15, 2022	Gold Country Casino & Resort	Oroville, California, USA
568	KOTC: Kick Start	December 5, 2021	Toyota Arena	Ontario, California, USA
567	KOTC: Homecoming 3	November 18, 2021	Coeur d'Alene Casino	Worley, Idaho, USA
566	KOTC: Future Legends 48	November 13, 2021	Silver Legacy Resort Casino	Reno, Nevada, USA
565	KOTC: Legendary	October 9, 2021	Seneca Niagara Resort & Casino	Niagara Falls, New York, USA
564	KOTC: Future Legends 47	August 21, 2021	Silver Legacy Resort Casino	Reno, Nevada, USA
563	KOTC: Cancelled	May 23, 2020	Chinook Winds Casino	Lincoln City, Oregon, USA
562	KOTC: Cage Wars 4	May 2, 2020	Two Rivers Convention Center	Grand Junction, Colorado, USA
561	KOTC: Fists N Fury	February 29, 2020	The Country Club Dance Hall & Saloon	Augusta, Georgia, USA
560	KOTC: Future Legends 46	February 22, 2020	Silver Legacy Resort Casino	Reno, Nevada, USA
559	KOTC: Pure Vengeance	February 1, 2020	Chinook Winds Casino	Lincoln City, Oregon, USA
558	KOTC: Golden Fights	January 25, 2020	Las Colonias Park Amphitheater	Grand Junction, Colorado, USA
557	KOTC: Return to Order	January 11, 2020	Gold Country Casino	Oroville, California, USA
556	KOTC: Hard Drive	December 8, 2019	Toyota Arena	Ontario, California, USA
555	KOTC: Future Legends 45	November 16, 2019	Silver Legacy Resort and Casino	Reno, Nevada, USA
554	KOTC: Rumble on the River 3	November 8, 2019	James Brown Arena	Augusta, Georgia, USA
553	KOTC: Showtime 2	September 21, 2019	Seneca Niagara Resort & Casino	Niagara Falls, New York, USA
552	KOTC: Capital Punishment	September 7, 2019	Pennsylvania Farm Show Complex	Harrisburg, Pennsylvania, USA
551	KOTC: Reaction Time	September 7, 2019	Bluewater Resort & Casino	Parker, Arizona, USA
550	KOTC: Future Legends 44	July 13, 2019	Silver Legacy Resort and Casino	Reno, Nevada, USA
549	KOTC: Golden Era	June 22, 2019	Citizens Business Bank Arena	Ontario, California, USA
548	KOTC: Resurgence	May 25, 2019	Chinook Winds Casino	Lincoln City, Oregon, USA
547	KOTC: River Wars	May 18, 2019	Bluewater Resort & Casino	Parker, Arizona, USA
546	KOTC: Rumble on the River 2	May 11, 2019	SRP Park	North Augusta, South Carolina, USA
545	KOTC: Supremacy 2	April 13, 2019	Yack Arena	Wyandotte, Michigan, USA
544	KOTC: Sin Rival	March 10, 2019	Citizens Arena Bank	Ontario, California, USA
543	KOTC: Awaited Return	March 2, 2019	North Star Casino Resort	Bowler, Wisconsin, USA
542	KOTC: Combat Zone	February 23, 2019	Seneca Niagara Resort & Casino	Niagara Falls, New York, USA
541	KOTC: Future Legends 43	February 9, 2019	Silver Legacy Casino	Reno, Nevada, USA
540	KOTC: Head Hunter	February 2, 2019	Chinook Winds Casino Resort	Lincoln City, Oregon, USA
539	KOTC: Hunting Season	January 26, 2019	WinnaVegas Casino	Sloan, Iowa, USA
538	KOTC: Starbound 2	December 2, 2018	Santa Ana Star Center	Rio Rancho, New Mexico, USA
537	KOTC: Future Legends 42	November 17, 2018	Silver Legacy Resort and Casino	Reno, Nevada, USA
536	KOTC: In The Mix	November 10, 2018	Seneca Allegany Resort & Casino	Salamanca, New York, USA
535	KOTC: 20th Anniversary	October 27, 2018	Citizens Arena Bank	Ontario, California, USA
534	KOTC: New Frontier	October 13, 2018	Live! Casino and Hotel	Hanover, Maryland, USA
533	KOTC: Epicenter 2	October 13, 2018	WinnaVegas Casino	Sloan, Iowa, USA
532	KOTC: Terminal Velocity	October 6, 2018	Gold Country Casino & Hotel	Oroville, California, USA
531	KOTC: Full Speed	September 28, 2018	Viejas Casino and Resort	Alpine, California, USA
530	KOTC: Territorial Conflict	September 15, 2018	Seneca Niagara Resort & Casino	Niagara Falls, New York, USA
529	KOTC: Demolition 2	September 8, 2018	Chinook Winds Casino	Lincoln City, Oregon, United States
528	KOTC: Aggressive Lifestyle	September 1, 2018	Sky Ute Casino Resort	Ignacio, Colorado, United States
527	KOTC: Future Legends 41	August 25, 2018	Silver Legacy Resort Casino	Reno, Nevada, United States
526	KOTC: Hard Knock 3	July 28, 2018	Yack Arena	Wyandotte, Michigan, United States
525	KOTC: Perennial	July 21, 2018	Sky Ute Casino Resort	Ignacio, Colorado, United States
524	KOTC: Impending Attack	July 14, 2018	WinnaVegas Casino & Resort	Sloan, Iowa, United States
523	KOTC: Highlight Reel	June 10, 2018	Citizen's Bank Arena	Ontario, California, United States
522	KOTC: Grand Finale	May 26, 2018	Chinook Winds Casino Resort	Lincoln City, Oregon, United States
521	KOTC: No Retreat	May 12, 2018	Seneca Allegany Casino	Salamanca, New York, United States
520	KOTC: Under Siege	May 4, 2018	Viejas Casino & Resort	Alpine, California, United States
519	KOTC: Anger Management	April 21, 2018	WinnaVegas Casino & Resort	Sloan, Iowa, United States
518	KOTC: No Escape	April 14, 2018	Gold Country Casino & Hotel	Oroville, California, United States
517	KOTC: Future Legends 40	March 16, 2018	Silver Legacy Resort Casino	Reno, Nevada, United States
516	KOTC: Energetic Pursuit	February 24, 2018	Citizens Business Bank Arena	Ontario, California, United States
515	KOTC: Prevail	February 17, 2018	Seneca Niagara Resort & Casino	Niagara Falls, New York, United States
514	KOTC: Fight to the Finish	February 3, 2018	Chinook Winds Casino	Lincoln City, Oregon, United States
513	KOTC: Horizon	January 27, 2018	Albuquerque Embassy Suites	Albuquerque, New Mexico, United States
512	KOTC: Mercenaries 2	January 13, 2018	WinnaVegas Casino and Resort	Sloan, Iowa, United States
511	KOTC: World Amateur Championships 4	December 9, 2017	Silver Legacy Resort Casino	Reno, Nevada, United States
510	KOTC: Conquistadores	December 3, 2017	Citizens Business Bank Arena	Ontario, California, United States
509	KOTC: Stone Cold	December 2, 2017	Menominee Casino Resort	Keshena, Wisconsin, United States
508	KOTC: Ultimate Mix	November 18, 2017	Seneca Allegany Resort & Casino	Salamanca, New York, United States
507	KOTC: New Beginning	November 16, 2017	Coeur d'Alene Casino	Worley, Idaho, United States
506	KOTC: Unstoppable 2	November 10, 2017	Black Bear Casino Resort	Carlton, Minnesota, United States
505	KOTC: Locked In	October 28, 2017	SugarHouse Casino	Philadelphia, Pennsylvania, United States
504	KOTC: Next Level	October 21, 2017	WinnaVegas Casino & Resort	Sloan, Iowa, United States
503	KOTC: Last Stand	October 7, 2017	Gold Country Casino & Hotel	Oroville, California, United States
502	KOTC: Future Legends 39	October 7, 2017	Cannery Casino & Hotel	Las Vegas, Nevada, United States
501	KOTC: Future Legends 38	September 16, 2017	Silver Legacy	Reno, Nevada, United States
500	KOTC: El Diablo	September 16, 2017	Ute Mountain Casino	Towaoc, Colorado, United States
499	KOTC: Never Surrender	September 9, 2017	Black Bear Casino Resort	Carlton, Minnesota, United States
498	KOTC: Never Quit	September 2, 2017	Citizens Business Bank Arena	Ontario, California, United States
497	KOTC: Next In Line	August 17, 2017	Coeur d'Alene Casino	Worley, Idaho, United States
496	KOTC: Counterstrike	August 12, 2017	Seneca Niagara Casino	Niagara Falls, New York, United States
495	KOTC: Fractured	August 5, 2017	Chinook Winds Casino	Lincoln City, Oregon, United States
494	KOTC: Second Coming	August 5, 2017	Yack Arena	Wyandotte, Michigan, United States
493	KOTC: Future Legends 37	July 15, 2017	Cannery Casino & Hotel	Las Vegas, Nevada, United States
492	KOTC: Maximum Intensity	July 15, 2017	WinnaVegas Casino & Resort	Sloan, Iowa, United States
491	KOTC: Short Range	July 8, 2017	The Meadows Casino Racetrack Hotel	Washington, Pennsylvania, United States
490	KOTC: Chosen Few	July 8, 2017	Santa Ana Star Center	Rio Rancho, New Mexico, United States
489	KOTC: Regulator	July 1, 2017	SugarHouse Casino	Philadelphia, Pennsylvania, United States
488	KOTC: Flashback	June 24, 2017	Gold Country Casino & Hotel	Oroville, California, United States
487	KOTC: Quick Draw	June 17, 2017	Shoshone-Bannock Hotel and Event Center	Fort Hall, Idaho, United States
486	KOTC: Canada 73	June 16, 2017	South Pavilion Exhibition Park	Lethbridge, Alberta, Canada
485	KOTC: Warlords 2	June 10, 2017	Ute Mountain Casino Hotel	Towaoc, Colorado, United States
484	KOTC: Fire Starter	June 9, 2017	Black Bear Casino Resort	Carlton, Minnesota, United States
483	KOTC: Head Strong	May 27, 2017	Chinook Winds Casino Resort	Lincoln City, Oregon, United States
482	KOTC: Future Kings	May 25, 2017	Coeur d'Alene Casino	Worley, Idaho, United States
481	KOTC: Future Legends 36	May 20, 2017	Silver Legacy	Reno, Nevada, United States
480	KOTC: Heavy Hands	May 13, 2017	The Meadows Casino	Washington, Pennsylvania, United States
479	KOTC: Groundbreaking	May 6, 2017	Soboba Casino	San Jacinto, California, United States
478	KOTC: Public Offense	May 6, 2017	Seneca Allegany Resort & Casino	Salamanca, New York, United States
477	KOTC: Supremacy	April 29, 2017	Yack Arena	Wyandotte, Michigan, United States
476	KOTC: Future Legends 35	April 15, 2017	Cannery Casino & Hotel	Las Vegas, Nevada, United States
475	KOTC: Territorial Dispute	April 15, 2017	WinnaVegas Casino & Resort	Sloan, Iowa, United States
474	KOTC: Starbound	April 8, 2017	Santa Ana Star Center	Rio Rancho, New Mexico, United States
473	KOTC: Supernova	March 18, 2017	Citizens Business Bank Arena	Ontario, California, United States
472	KOTC: Bloody War	March 11, 2017	Menominee Casino Resort	Keshena, Wisconsin, United States
471	KOTC: Canada 72	March 3, 2017	Energy Centre Fieldhouse	Cold Lake, Alberta, Canada
470	KOTC: Violent Confrontation	March 3, 2017	Black Bear Casino Resort	Carlton, Minnesota, United States
469	KOTC: Raw Deal	February 25, 2017	Seneca Niagara Resorts & Casino	Niagara Falls, New York, United States
468	KOTC: New Blood	February 16, 2017	Coeur D'Alene Casino and Resort	Worley, Idaho, United States
467	KOTC: Future Legends 34	February 11, 2017	Silver Legacy	Reno, Nevada, United States
466	KOTC: Heavy Trauma	February 4, 2017	Chinook Winds Casino Resort	Lincoln City, Oregon, United States
465	KOTC: Most Wanted	January 14, 2017	WinnaVegas Casino & Resort	Sloan, Iowa, United States
464	KOTC: Warranted Aggression	December 18, 2016	Citizens Business Bank Arena	Ontario, California, USA
463	KOTC: Declaring War	December 9, 2016	Black Bear Casino	Carlton, Minnesota, USA
462	KOTC: Hazzard Pay	December 3, 2016	Menominee Casino Resort	Keshena, Wisconsin, United States
461	KOTC: Desert Reign	November 26, 2016	Wassaja Ballroom at We-Ko-Pa Resort	Scottsdale, Arizona, United States
460	KOTC: Duke City 2	November 26, 2016	Embassy Suites by Hilton	Albuquerque, New Mexico, United States
459	KOTC: Warp Speed	November 19, 2016	Shoshone-Bannock Chief's Event Center	Fort Hall, Idaho, United States
458	KOTC: Fall Out	November 17, 2016	Coeur d'Alene Casino	Worley, Idaho, United States
457	KOTC: Revolutionary	October 22, 2016	Northern Lights Casino	Walker, Minnesota, United States
456	KOTC: Future Legends 33	October 15, 2016	Cannery Casino & Hotel	Las Vegas, Nevada, United States
455	KOTC: Equalizer	October 15, 2016	Lake of Torches Casino	Lac du Flambeau, Wisconsin, United States
454	KOTC: Unchallenged	October 8, 2016	Gold Country Casino & Hotel	Oroville, California, United States
453	KOTC: Social Disorder	October 8, 2016	WinnaVegas Casino & Resort	Sloan, Iowa, United States
452	KOTC: Reignite	October 1, 2016	Ute Mountain Casino	Towaoc, Colorado, United States
451	KOTC: High Caliber	October 1, 2016	Chinook Winds Casino Resort	Lincoln City, Oregon, United States
450	KOTC: National Dispute	September 24, 2016	Seneca Niagara Resort & Casino	Niagara Falls, New York, United States
449	KOTC: Lethbridge	September 23, 2016	South Pavilion Exhibition Park	Lethbridge, Alberta, Canada
448	KOTC: Martial Law	September 18, 2016	Citizen's Business Bank Arena	Ontario, California, United States
447	KOTC: Harm's Way	September 17, 2016	Meadows Casino	Washington, Pennsylvania, United States
446	KOTC: Due Process	September 9, 2016	Black Bear Casino Resort	Carlton, Minnesota, United States
445	KOTC: World Amateur Championships 3	September 3, 2016	Hard Rock Hotel & Casino	Las Vegas, Nevada, United States
444	KOTC: No Remorse	August 18, 2016	Coeur d'Alene Casino	Worley, Idaho, United States
443	KOTC: Will Power	August 13, 2016	Embassy Suites	Albuquerque, New Mexico, United States
442	KOTC: Provoked	August 6, 2016	Chinook Winds Casino Resort	Lincoln City, Oregon, United States
441	KOTC: Natural Instinct	July 30, 2016	Lake of the Torches Casino	Lac du Flambeau, Wisconsin, United States
440	KOTC: Destructive Intent	July 23, 2016	Meadows Casino	Washington, Pennsylvania, United States
439	KOTC: Ultimate Collision	July 8, 2016	Black Bear Casino Resort	Carlton, Minnesota, United States
438	KOTC: Summer Smash	June 25, 2016	WinnaVegas Casino & Resort	Sloan, Iowa, United States
437	KOTC: Wipeout	June 4, 2016	Chinook Winds Casino Resort	Lincoln City, Oregon, United States
436	KOTC: Firefight	June 4, 2016	Soboba Casino	San Jacinto, California, USA
435	KOTC: Counter Punch	May 21, 2016	Fort Hall Casino	Fort Hall, Idaho, USA
434	KOTC: Blood Enemies	May 21, 2016	Meadows Casino	Washington, Pennsylvania, USA
433	KOTC: Battle Zone	May 19, 2016	Coeur d'Alene Casino	Worley, Idaho, USA
432	KOTC: Risilient	May 14, 2016	Ute Mountain Casino	Towaoc, Colorado, USA
431	KOTC: Future Legends 32	April 30, 2016	Cannery Casino & Hotel	Las Vegas, Nevada, USA
430	KOTC: Total Devastation	April 23, 2016	Lake of the Torches Resort Casino	Lac du Flambeau, Wisconsin, USA
429	KOTC: New Era	April 9, 2016	WinnaVegas Casino Resort	Sloan, Iowa, USA
428	KOTC: Generation X	April 8, 2016	Black Bear Casino Resort	Carlton, Minnesota, USA
427	KOTC: Home Turf	March 19, 2016	Gold Country Casino & Hotel	Oroville, California, USA
426	KOTC: Extreme Horsepower	March 12, 2016	Seneca Niagara Resort & Casino	Niagara Falls, New York, USA
425	KOTC: Night of Champions	March 5, 2016	Citizens Business Bank Arena	Ontario, California, USA
424	KOTC: Shattered	March 5, 2016	Menominee Casino	Keshena, Wisconsin, USA
423	KOTC: Wrecking Ball	March 4, 2016	Genesis Centre	Calgary, Alberta, Canada
422	KOTC: Frozen War	February 20, 2016	Northern Lights Casino Hotel & Events Center	Walker, Minnesota, United States
421	KOTC: Explosive	February 18, 2016	Coeur D'Alene Casino Resort Hotel	Worley, Idaho, United States
420	KOTC: No Fear	February 6, 2016	Chinook Winds Casino	Lincoln City, Oregon, United States
419	KOTC: Cold War	January 30, 2016	WinnaVegas Casino Resort	Sloan, Iowa, United States
418	KOTC: Thunder n' Lightning	January 8, 2016	Black Bear Casino Resort	Carlton, Minnesota, United States
417	KOTC: Bitter Enemies	December 5, 2015	Menominee Casino Resort	Keshena, Wisconsin, United States
416	KOTC: Future Legends 31	December 5, 2015	Eastside Cannery	Las Vegas, Nevada, United States
415	KOTC: Bear Brawl	November 21, 2015	Black Bear Casino Resort	Carlton, Minnesota, United States
414	KOTC: Evolution	November 20, 2015	Sheraton Albuquerque Uptown	Albuquerque, New Mexico, United States
413	KOTC: Untamed	November 19, 2015	Coeur d'Alene Resort	Coeur d'Alene, Idaho, United States
412	KOTC: Battle at the Lake	November 14, 2015	Spirit Lake Casino	Saint Michael, North Dakota, United States
411	KOTC: Thunder	October 31, 2015	Socorro Entertainment Center	Socorro, Texas, United States
410	KOTC: Harvest of Champions	October 24, 2015	WinnaVegas	Sloan, Iowa, United States
409	KOTC: Sinister Intentions	October 17, 2015	Hard Rock Hotel and Casino	Las Vegas, Nevada, United States
408	KOTC: Title at the Torch	October 17, 2015	Lake of the Torches	Lac du Flambeau, Wisconsin, United States
407	KOTC: Gladiators Collide	October 10, 2015	Northern Lights Casino	Walker, Minnesota, United States
406	KOTC: Total Elimination	October 3, 2015	Gold Country Casino and Hotel	Oroville, California, United States
405	KOTC: Hands of Steel	September 26, 2015	The Meadows Racetrack and Casino	Washington, Pennsylvania, United States
404	KOTC: Rogue Wave	September 5, 2015	Chinook Winds Casino	Lincoln City, Oregon, United States
403	KOTC: Bitter Rivals	August 29, 2015	Citizens Business Bank Arena	Ontario, California, United States
402	KOTC: Power Surge	August 22, 2015	Black Bear Casino Resort	Carlton, Minnesota, United States
401	KOTC: Bad Reputation	August 20, 2015	Coeur d'Alene Resort	Coeur d'Alene, Idaho, United States
400	KOTC: Grind	August 15, 2015	Sheraton Albuquerque Uptown	Albuquerque, New Mexico, United States
399	KOTC: Future Legends 30	August 15, 2015	Eastside Cannery	Las Vegas, Nevada, United States
398	KOTC: Warriors	August 8, 2015	Socorro Entertainment Center	Socorro, Texas, United States
397	KOTC: Warriors Collide	August 8, 2015	Spirit Lake Casino	Saint Michael, North Dakota, United States
396	KOTC: Rumble on the River	August 1, 2015	WinnaVegas	Sloan, Iowa, United States
395	KOTC: Attack Mode	July 25, 2015	Lake of the Torches	Lac du Flambeau, Wisconsin, United States
394	KOTC: Counter Attack	July 11, 2015	The Meadows Racetrack and Casino	Washington, Pennsylvania, United States
393	KOTC: Undeniable	June 27, 2015	Chinook Winds Casino	Lincoln City, Oregon, United States
392	KOTC: Sanctioned	June 14, 2015	Soboba Casino	San Jacinto, California, United States
391	KOTC: Awakening	June 4, 2015	Coeur d'Alene Resort	Coeur d'Alene, Idaho, United States
390	KOTC: Future Legends 29	May 23, 2015	Eastside Cannery Hotel and Casino	Las Vegas, Nevada, United States
389	KOTC: Total Dominance	May 16, 2015	Black Bear Casino Resort	Carlton, Minnesota, United States
388	KOTC: Power Play	May 9, 2015	WinnaVegas	Sloan, Iowa, United States
387	KOTC: Bad Blood	May 2, 2015	Spirit Lake Casino	Saint Michael, North Dakota, United States
386	KOTC: Cutting Edge	April 25, 2015	Hotel Cascada	Albuquerque, New Mexico, United States
385	KOTC: Lone Survivor	April 25, 2015	The Meadows Racetrack and Casino	Washington, Pennsylvania, United States
384	KOTC: World Amateur Championships 2	April 18, 2015	Citizens Business Bank Arena	Ontario, California, United States
383	KOTC: Extreme Measures	April 18, 2015	Lake of the Torches	Lac du Flambeau, Wisconsin, United States
382	KOTC: Onslaught	April 11, 2015	Socorro Entertainment Center	Socorro, Texas, United States
381	KOTC: March Mayhem	March 28, 2015	Northern Lights Casino	Walker, Minnesota, United States
380	KOTC: Warriors Spirit	March 21, 2015	Chinook Winds Casino	Lincoln City, Oregon, United States
379	KOTC: Coming Home	March 15, 2015	Soboba Casino	San Jacinto, California, United States
378	KOTC: Blood Brothers	March 7, 2015	Menominee Casino Resort	Keshena, Wisconsin, United States
377	KOTC: Future Legends 28	February 28, 2015	Eastside Cannery	Las Vegas, Nevada, United States
376	KOTC: Public Enemy	February 21, 2015	Black Bear Casino Resort	Carlton, Minnesota, United States
375	KOTC: Short Fuse	February 12, 2015	Coeur d'Alene Resort	Coeur d'Alene, Idaho, United States
374	KOTC: Fierce	January 24, 2015	Socorro Entertainment Center	Socorro, Texas, United States
373	KOTC: Rough Justice	January 24, 2015	WinnaVegas	Sloan, Iowa, United States
372	KOTC: Fighting Spirit	January 17, 2015	Spirit Lake Casino	Saint Michael, North Dakota, United States
371	KOTC: Future Legends 27	December 6, 2014	Eastside Cannery	Las Vegas, Nevada, United States
370	KOTC: Beastmaster	December 5, 2014	Menominee Casino Resort	Keshena, Wisconsin, United States
369	KOTC: Fisticuffs	December 4, 2014	San Manuel Indian Bingo and Casino	Highland, California, United States
368	KOTC: Industrial Strength	November 21, 2014	Black Bear Casino Resort	Carlton, Minnesota, United States
367	KOTC: Tactical Strike	November 13, 2014	Coeur d'Alene Resort	Coeur d'Alene, Idaho, United States
366	KOTC: Duke City	November 1, 2014	Crowne Plaza Albuquerque	Albuquerque, New Mexico, United States
365	KOTC: Headhunter	October 25, 2014	Northern Lights Casino	Walker, Minnesota, United States
364	KOTC: Rebellion	October 18, 2014	Lake of the Torches	Lac du Flambeau, Wisconsin, United States
363	KOTC: Diversion	October 4, 2014	WinnaVegas	Sloan, Iowa, United States
362	KOTC: Battle For The Belt	October 2, 2014	San Manuel Indian Bingo and Casino	Highland, California, United States
361	KOTC: Haymaker	September 27, 2014	Las Cruces Convention Center	Las Cruces, New Mexico, United States
360	KOTC: Magnum Force	September 27, 2014	Black Bear Casino Resort	Carlton, Minnesota, United States
359	KOTC: Aerial Assault 2	September 20, 2014	Menominee Casino Resort	Keshena, Wisconsin, United States
358	KOTC: Future Legends 26	September 13, 2014	Edgewater Hotel and Casino	Laughlin, Nevada, United States
357	KOTC: Future Legends 25	August 30, 2014	Eastside Cannery	Las Vegas, Nevada, United States
356	KOTC: Steadfast	August 14, 2014	Coeur d'Alene Resort	Coeur d'Alene, Idaho, United States
355	KOTC: Point of Impact	August 7, 2014	San Manuel Indian Bingo and Casino	Highland, California, United States
354	KOTC: Damage Report	July 26, 2014	Lake of the Torches	Lac du Flambeau, Wisconsin, United States
353	KOTC: Battle Tested	July 12, 2014	Northern Lights Casino	Walker, Minnesota, United States
352	KOTC: Rise	July 11, 2014	Las Cruces Convention Center	Las Cruces, New Mexico, United States
351	KOTC: Future Legends 24	June 14, 2014	Edgewater Hotel and Casino	Laughlin, Nevada, United States
350	KOTC: Slugfest	June 5, 2014	San Manuel Indian Bingo and Casino	Highland, California, United States
349	KOTC: Viewers Discretion	May 31, 2014	Menominee Casino Resort	Keshena, Wisconsin, United States
348	KOTC: Alliance	May 26, 2014	Talking Stick Resort	Scottsdale, Arizona, United States
347	KOTC: Future Legends 23	May 24, 2014	Crowne Plaza Albuquerque	Albuquerque, New Mexico, United States
346	KOTC: Seek and Destroy	May 22, 2014	Coeur d'Alene Resort	Coeur d'Alene, Idaho, United States
345	KOTC: Future Legends 22	May 17, 2014	Eastside Cannery	Las Vegas, Nevada, United States
344	KOTC: Quarantined	May 10, 2014	Kewadin Casino	Sault Ste. Marie, Michigan, United States
343	KOTC: Clockwork	April 26, 2014	Lake of the Torches	Lac du Flambeau, Wisconsin, United States
342	KOTC: Throwdown	April 19, 2014	Las Cruces Convention Center	Las Cruces, New Mexico, United States
341	KOTC: Beaten Path	March 6, 2014	San Manuel Indian Bingo and Casino	Highland, California, United States
340	KOTC: Radar Lock	February 22, 2014	Talking Stick Resort	Scottsdale, Arizona, United States
339	KOTC: Unrestricted	February 15, 2014	Northern Lights Casino	Walker, Minnesota, United States
338	KOTC: Unleashed	February 13, 2014	Coeur d'Alene Resort	Coeur d'Alene, Idaho, United States
337	KOTC: Rumble	February 8, 2014	Crowne Plaza Albuquerque	Albuquerque, New Mexico, United States
336	KOTC: Future Legends 21	February 8, 2014	Eastside Cannery	Las Vegas, Nevada, United States
335	KOTC: Future Legends 20	January 10, 2014	Edgewater Hotel and Casino	Laughlin, Nevada, United States
334	KOTC: Driven	December 7, 2013	Ute Mountain Casino Hotel & Resort	Towaoc, Colorado, United States
333	KOTC: Future Legends 19	December 7, 2013	Eastside Cannery	Las Vegas, Nevada, United States
332	KOTC: Enemy Territory	November 30, 2013	Gold Country Casino and Hotel	Oroville, California, United States
331	KOTC: Dynamite	November 9, 2013	Menominee Casino Resort	Keshena, Wisconsin, United States
330	KOTC: Terrified	October 31, 2013	San Manuel Indian Bingo and Casino	Highland, California, United States
329	KOTC: All In 2	October 26, 2013	Northern Lights Casino	Walker, Minnesota, United States
328	KOTC: World Amateur Championships	October 19, 2013	Pearl Concert Theater at Palms Casino Resort	Las Vegas, Nevada, United States
327	KOTC: Under Fire	October 12, 2013	Lake of the Torches	Lac du Flambeau, Wisconsin, United States
326	KOTC: Future Legends 18	October 5, 2013	Crowne Plaza Albuquerque	Albuquerque, New Mexico, United States
325	KOTC: Double Impact	October 4, 2013	Coeur d'Alene Resort	Coeur d'Alene, Idaho, United States
324	KOTC: Boiling Point	September 28, 2013	Talking Stick Resort	Scottsdale, Arizona, United States
323	KOTC: Arsenal	September 14, 2013	Ute Mountain Casino Hotel & Resort	Towaoc, Colorado, United States
322	KOTC: Future Legends 17	September 7, 2013	Edgewater Hotel and Casino	Laughlin, Nevada, United States
321	KOTC: Maximum Speed	August 31, 2013	Menominee Casino Resort	Keshena, Wisconsin, United States
320	KOTC: Future Legends 16	August 31, 2013	Eastside Cannery	Las Vegas, Nevada, United States
319	KOTC: Split Decision	August 29, 2013	San Manuel Indian Bingo and Casino	Highland, California, United States
318	KOTC: Unprecedented	August 17, 2013	Gold Country Casino and Hotel	Oroville, California, United States
317	KOTC: Train Wreck	July 27, 2013	Lake of the Torches	Lac du Flambeau, Wisconsin, United States
316	KOTC: Heated Fury	July 20, 2013	Talking Stick Resort	Scottsdale, Arizona, United States
315	KOTC: Validation	July 11, 2013	San Manuel Indian Bingo and Casino	Highland, California, United States
314	KOTC: Patriarch	July 6, 2013	Northern Lights Casino	Walker, Minnesota, United States
313	KOTC: Worldwide	July 5, 2013	Mall of Asia Arena	Manila, National Capital Region, Philippines
312	KOTC: East vs. West	June 22, 2013	Sunshine Building	Albuquerque, New Mexico, United States
311	KOTC: Attrition	June 15, 2013	Ute Mountain Casino Hotel & Resort	Towaoc, Colorado, United States
310	KOTC: It's Personal	June 13, 2013	Coeur d'Alene Resort	Coeur d'Alene, Idaho, United States
309	KOTC: Unsigned	June 8, 2013	Maui War Memorial	Maui, Hawaii, United States
308	KOTC: Future Legends 15	June 1, 2013	Edgewater Hotel and Casino	Laughlin, Nevada, United States
307	KOTC: World Championships	May 25, 2013	Talking Stick Resort	Scottsdale, Arizona, United States
306	KOTC: Future Legends 14	May 25, 2013	Eastside Cannery	Las Vegas, Nevada, United States
305	KOTC: Certified	April 20, 2013	Menominee Casino Resort	Keshena, Wisconsin, United States
304	KOTC: Lights Out	April 13, 2013	Lake of the Torches	Lac du Flambeau, Wisconsin, United States
303	KOTC: Fighting Legends	April 13, 2013	Gold Country Casino and Hotel	Oroville, California, United States
302	KOTC: Devastation	April 11, 2013	San Manuel Indian Bingo and Casino	Highland, California, United States
301	KOTC: High Octane	March 16, 2013	Northern Lights Casino	Walker, Minnesota, United States
300	KOTC: Roughnecks	March 9, 2013	Ute Mountain Casino Hotel & Resort	Towaoc, Colorado, United States
299	KOTC: Future Legends 13	March 2, 2013	Eastside Cannery	Las Vegas, Nevada, United States
298	KOTC: Free Fall 2	February 22, 2013	Coeur d'Alene Resort	Coeur d'Alene, Idaho, United States
297	KOTC: New Vision	February 16, 2013	Jackpot Junction	Morton, Minnesota, United States
296	KOTC: Restitution	February 7, 2013	San Manuel Indian Bingo and Casino	Highland, California, United States
295	KOTC: Curtain Call	January 26, 2013	Riverwind Casino	Norman, Oklahoma, United States
294	KOTC: Regulators	January 19, 2013	Talking Stick Resort	Scottsdale, Arizona, United States
293	KOTC: Future Legends 12	January 5, 2013	Edgewater Hotel and Casino	Laughlin, Nevada, United States
292	KOTC: Vigilante	December 20, 2012	San Manuel Indian Bingo and Casino	Highland, California, United States
291	KOTC: Unification	December 8, 2012	River Spirit Casino	Tulsa, Oklahoma, United States
290	KOTC: Future Legends 11	December 8, 2012	Eastside Cannery	Las Vegas, Nevada, United States
289	KOTC: Battlegrounds	December 1, 2012	Ute Mountain Casino Hotel & Resort	Towaoc, Colorado, United States
288	KOTC: Fire and Ice	December 1, 2012	Northern Lights Casino	Walker, Minnesota, United States
287	KOTC: Final Countdown	November 10, 2012	Buffalo Thunder Casino and Resort	Santa Fe, New Mexico, United States
286	KOTC: Gun Show	October 25, 2012	San Manuel Indian Bingo and Casino	Highland, California, United States
285	KOTC: Mana	October 20, 2012	Neal S. Blaisdell Center	Honolulu, Hawaii, United States
284	KOTC: Future Legends 10	October 20, 2012	Edgewater Hotel and Casino	Laughlin, Nevada, United States
283	KOTC: Double Down	October 13, 2012	Gold Country Casino and Hotel	Oroville, California, United States
282	KOTC: Stranglehold	October 6, 2012	WinStar World Casino	Thackerville, Oklahoma, United States
281	KOTC: Survival	October 6, 2012	Lake of the Torches	Lac du Flambeau, Wisconsin, United States
280	KOTC: Heavy Duty	September 21, 2012	SpiritCasino	Tulsa, Oklahoma, United States
279	KOTC: Surgical Strike	September 15, 2012	Riverwind Casino	Norman, Oklahoma, United States
278	KOTC: Sandman	September 8, 2012	Ute Mountain Casino Hotel & Resort	Towaoc, Colorado, United States
277	KOTC: Future Legends 9	September 1, 2012	Eastside Cannery	Las Vegas, Nevada, United States
276	KOTC: Mercenaries	August 30, 2012	San Manuel Indian Bingo and Casino	Highland, California, United States
275	KOTC: Breaking Point	August 23, 2012	Coeur d'Alene Resort	Coeur d'Alene, Idaho, United States
274	KOTC: Future Legends 8	August 18, 2012	Edgewater Hotel and Casino	Laughlin, Nevada, United States
273	KOTC: Ignite	August 11, 2012	Buffalo Thunder Casino and Resort	Santa Fe, New Mexico, United States
272	KOTC: Sudden Strike	August 4, 2012	Northern Lights Casino	Walker, Minnesota, United States
271	KOTC: Ali'is	July 14, 2012	Neal S. Blaisdell Center	Honolulu, Hawaii, United States
270	KOTC: Wrangler	July 7, 2012	Ute Mountain Casino Hotel & Resort	Towaoc, Colorado, United States
269	KOTC: Aerial Assault	June 30, 2012	WinStar World Casino	Thackerville, Oklahoma, United States
268	KOTC: Trump Card	June 30, 2012	Lake of the Torches	Lac du Flambeau, Wisconsin, United States
267	KOTC: Hostile Territory	June 22, 2012	River Spirit Casino	Tulsa, Oklahoma, United States
266	KOTC: Thunderstorm	June 16, 2012	Riverwind Casino	Norman, Oklahoma, United States
265	KOTC: Future Legends 7	June 2, 2012	Eastside Cannery	Las Vegas, Nevada, United States
264	KOTC: Future Legends 6	May 19, 2012	Edgewater Hotel and Casino	Laughlin, Nevada, United States
263	KOTC: Wild Card	May 17, 2012	Coeur d'Alene Resort	Coeur d'Alene, Idaho, United States
262	KOTC: Nightmare	May 12, 2012	Buffalo Thunder Casino and Resort	Santa Fe, New Mexico, United States
261	KOTC: Hardcore	April 26, 2012	San Manuel Indian Bingo and Casino	Highland, California, United States
260	KOTC: Underground 73	April 21, 2012	Ute Mountain Casino Hotel & Resort	Towaoc, Colorado, United States
259	KOTC: All In	April 21, 2012	Gold Country Casino and Hotel	Oroville, California, United States
258	KOTC: Punch Out	April 14, 2012	Lake of the Torches	Lac du Flambeau, Wisconsin, United States
257	KOTC: Bad Intentions II	April 14, 2012	WinStar World Casino	Thackerville, Oklahoma, United States
256	KOTC: March Mania	March 17, 2012	Northern Lights Casino	Walker, Minnesota, United States
255	KOTC: Prohibited	March 17, 2012	Riverwind Casino	Norman, Oklahoma, United States
254	KOTC: Breakthrough	March 10, 2012	River Spirit Casino	Tulsa, Oklahoma, United States
253	KOTC: Future Legends 5	March 3, 2012	Eastside Cannery	Las Vegas, Nevada, United States
252	KOTC: Reckless Abandon	February 2, 2012	San Manuel Indian Bingo and Casino	Highland, California, United States
251	KOTC: Total Destruction	January 21, 2012	WinStar World Casino	Thackerville, Oklahoma, United States
250	KOTC: Night Stalker	January 14, 2012	Buffalo Thunder Casino and Resort	Santa Fe, New Mexico, United States
249	KOTC: Steel Curtain	December 17, 2011	Riverwind Casino	Norman, Oklahoma, United States
248	KOTC: Magnaflow	December 15, 2011	San Manuel Indian Bingo and Casino	Highland, California, United States
247	KOTC: Future Legends 4	December 10, 2011	Eastside Cannery	Las Vegas, Nevada, United States
246	KOTC: Winter Warriors	December 10, 2011	Northern Lights Casino	Walker, Minnesota, United States
245	KOTC: High Performance	November 19, 2011	Buffalo Thunder Casino and Resort	Santa Fe, New Mexico, United States
244	KOTC: Cage Quest	November 12, 2011	Gold Country Casino and Hotel	Oroville, California, United States
243	KOTC: Underground 72	November 12, 2011	Kewadin Casino	Sault Ste. Marie, Michigan, United States
242	KOTC: Underground 71	October 15, 2011	Ute Mountain Casino Hotel & Resort	Towaoc, Colorado, United States
241	KOTC: Interference	October 8, 2011	Lake of the Torches	Lac du Flambeau, Wisconsin, United States
240	KOTC: Homecoming	September 24, 2011	Soaring Eagle Casino & Resort	Mount Pleasant, Michigan, United States
239	KOTC: Apocalypse	September 17, 2011	WinStar World Casino	Thackerville, Oklahoma, United States
238	KOTC: First Defense	September 15, 2011	San Manuel Indian Bingo and Casino	Highland, California, United States
237	KOTC: Rising Sun	September 10, 2011	Buffalo Thunder Casino and Resort	Santa Fe, New Mexico, United States
236	KOTC: Future Legends 3	September 3, 2011	Eastside Cannery	Las Vegas, Nevada, United States
235	KOTC: Underground 70	August 27, 2011	Leelanau Sands Casino	Peshawbestown, Michigan, United States
234	KOTC: Kingpin	August 27, 2011	Lubbock Memorial Civic Center	Lubbock, Texas, United States
233	KOTC: Overdrive	August 20, 2011	Riverwind Casino	Norman, Oklahoma, United States
232	KOTC: Demolition	August 6, 2011	Northern Lights Casino	Walker, Minnesota, United States
231	KOTC: Compression Test	July 23, 2011	Lake of the Torches	Lac du Flambeau, Wisconsin, United States
230	KOTC: Shockwave	July 23, 2011	Gold Country Casino and Hotel	Oroville, California, United States
229	KOTC: Underground 69	July 16, 2011	Dream Makers Theater	Sault Ste. Marie, Michigan, United States
228	KOTC: High Altitude	July 16, 2011	Ute Mountain Casino Hotel & Resort	Towaoc, Colorado, United States
227	KOTC: Next Generation	June 30, 2011	San Manuel Indian Bingo and Casino	Highland, California, United States
226	KOTC: D-Day	June 25, 2011	Royal Oak Music Theatre	Royal Oak, Michigan, United States
225	KOTC: Epic Force	June 24, 2011	WinStar World Casino	Thackerville, Oklahoma, United States
224	KOTC: Future Legends 2	June 4, 2011	Eastside Cannery	Las Vegas, Nevada, United States
223	KOTC: Fight to Live	May 14, 2011	San Manuel Indian Bingo and Casino	San Bernardino, California, United States
222	KOTC: Moral Victory	April 21, 2011	San Manuel Indian Bingo and Casino	San Bernardino, California, United States
221	KOTC: Underground 68	April 16, 2011	Leelanau Sands Casino	Peshawbestown, Michigan, United States
220	KOTC: Texas	April 16, 2011	N/A	Lubbock, Texas, United States
219	KOTC: Outkasts	April 9, 2011	Lake of the Torches	Lac du Flambeau, Wisconsin, United States
218	KOTC: Underground 67	April 2, 2011	Ute Mountain Casino Hotel & Resort	Towaoc, Colorado, United States
217	KOTC: Underground 66	April 2, 2011	Kewadin Casino	Sault Ste. Marie, Michigan, United States
216	KOTC: Turning Point	March 27, 2011	Braemar Country Club	Tarzana, Los Angeles, California, United States
215	KOTC: Future Legends	March 5, 2011	Eastside Cannery	Las Vegas, Nevada, United States
214	KOTC: Northern Meltdown	February 19, 2011	Northern Lights Casino	Walker, Minnesota, United States
213	KOTC: Empire	February 3, 2011	San Manuel Indian Bingo and Casino	San Bernardino, California, United States
212	KOTC: Underground 65	January 22, 2011	Ute Mountain Casino Hotel & Resort	Towaoc, Colorado, United States
211	KOTC: Confrontation	January 15, 2011	Buffalo Thunder Casino and Resort	Santa Fe, New Mexico, United States
210	KOTC: Steel	December 9, 2010	San Manuel Indian Bingo and Casino	San Bernardino, California, United States
209	KOTC: Zero Tolerance	November 27, 2010	Inn of the Mountain Gods Resort & Casino	Mescalero, New Mexico, United States
208	KOTC: Platinum	November 25, 2010	Durban International Convention Centre	Durban, South Africa
207	KOTC: Infusion	November 13, 2010	Eastside Cannery	Las Vegas, Nevada, United States
206	KOTC: Underground 64	November 6, 2010	Kewadin Casino	Sault Ste. Marie, Michigan, United States
205	KOTC: Mainstream	October 29, 2010	Jackpot Junction	Morton, Minnesota, United States
204	KOTC: Free Fall	October 23, 2010	Northern Lights Casino	Walker, Minnesota, United States
203	KOTC: High Profile	October 9, 2010	Lake of the Torches	Lac du Flambeau, Wisconsin, United States
202	KOTC: Inferno	October 7, 2010	San Manuel Indian Bingo and Casino	Highland, California, United States
201	KOTC: Underground 63	October 2, 2010	Avi Resort & Casino	Laughlin, Nevada, United States
200	KOTC: Underground 62	September 18, 2010	Ute Mountain Casino Hotel & Resort	Towaoc, Colorado, United States
199	KOTC: No Mercy	September 17, 2010	MGM Grand Casino at Foxwoods	Mashantucket, Connecticut, United States
198	KOTC: Civil War 2	September 11, 2010	Royal Oak Music Theatre	Royal Oak, Michigan, United States
197	KOTC: Underground 61	August 28, 2010	Leelanau Sands Casino	Peshawbestown, Michigan, United States
196	KOTC: Underground 60	August 14, 2010	Kewadin Casino	Sault Ste. Marie, Michigan, United States
195	KOTC: Imminent Danger	August 13, 2010	Inn of the Mountain Gods Resort & Casino	Mescalero, New Mexico, United States
194	KOTC: Sniper	August 5, 2010	San Manuel Indian Bingo and Casino	San Bernardino, California, United States
193	KOTC: Underground 59	July 31, 2010	Storm Stadium	Lake Elsinore, California, United States
192	KOTC: Chain Reaction	July 17, 2010	Storm Stadium	Lake Elsinore, California, United States
191	KOTC: Tropical Storm	July 10, 2010	Storm Stadium	Lake Elsinore, California, United States
190	KOTC: Underground 58	June 5, 2010	Quinault Beach Resort and Casino	Ocean Shores, Washington, United States
189	KOTC: Adrenaline	June 4, 2010	Buffalo Thunder Casino and Resort	Santa Fe, New Mexico, United States
188	KOTC: Underground 57	May 22, 2010	Ute Mountain Casino Hotel & Resort	Towaoc, Colorado, United States
187	KOTC: Honor	May 14, 2010	Inn of the Mountain Gods Resort & Casino	Mescalero, New Mexico, United States
186	KOTC: Excessive Damage	May 13, 2010	San Manuel Indian Bingo and Casino	Highland, California, United States
185	KOTC: Underground 56	May 8, 2010	Kewadin Casino	Sault Ste. Marie, Michigan, United States
184	KOTC: Underground 55	April 30, 2010	Jackpot Junction	Morton, Minnesota, United States
183	KOTC: Turbulence 2	April 24, 2010	Lake of the Torches	Lac du Flambeau, Wisconsin, United States
182	KOTC: Underground 54	April 17, 2010	Leelanau Sands Casino	Peshawbestown, Michigan, United States
181	KOTC: Bad Boys II	April 16, 2010	Cobo Arena	Detroit, Michigan, United States
180	KOTC: Legacy	March 26, 2010	Silver Legacy Reno	Reno, Nevada, United States
179	KOTC: Upper Cut	March 13, 2010	Avi Resort & Casino	Laughlin, Nevada, United States
178	KOTC: Native Warriors	March 6, 2010	Buffalo Thunder Casino and Resort	Santa Fe, New Mexico, United States
177	KOTC: Ice Age	March 5, 2010	Shooting Star Casino	Mahnomen, Minnesota, United States
176	KOTC: Starlight	February 27, 2010	Ute Mountain Casino Hotel & Resort	Towaoc, Colorado, United States
175	KOTC: Arrival	February 25, 2010	San Manuel Indian Bingo and Casino	Highland, California, United States
174	KOTC: Vengeance	February 12, 2010	Inn of the Mountain Gods Resort & Casino	Mescalero, New Mexico, United States
173	KOTC: Offensive Strategy	February 6, 2010	Northern Lights Casino	Walker, Minnesota, United States
172	KOTC: Toryumon	January 30, 2010	Okinawa Convention Center	Ginowan, Okinawa, Japan
171	KOTC: Fight 4 Hope	December 17, 2009	San Manuel Indian Bingo and Casino	Highland, California, United States
170	KOTC: Title Defense	December 12, 2009	Kewadin Casino	Sault Ste. Marie, Michigan, United States
169	KOTC: Horse Power	November 28, 2009	Inn of the Mountain Gods Resort & Casino	Mescalero, New Mexico, United States
168	KOTC: Wreckage	October 30, 2009	Lucky Star Casino	Clinton, Oklahoma, United States
167	KOTC: Rip Tide	October 10, 2009	Quinault Beach Resort and Casino	Ocean Shores, Washington, United States
166	KOTC: Strike Point	October 10, 2009	Lake of the Torches	Lac du Flambeau, Wisconsin, United States
165	KOTC: Jolted	October 3, 2009	Avi Resort & Casino	Laughlin, Nevada, United States
164	KOTC: Distorted	October 1, 2009	San Manuel Indian Bingo and Casino	Highland, California, United States
163	KOTC: Forged Steel	September 26, 2009	Ute Mountain Casino Hotel & Resort	Towaoc, Colorado, United States
162	KOTC: Turmoil	September 5, 2009	Northern Lights Casino	Walker, Minnesota, United States
161	KOTC: Eruption	August 29, 2009	Leelanau Sands Casino	Peshawbestown, Michigan, United States
160	KOTC: Thunderstruck	August 15, 2009	Comcast Arena	Everett, Washington, United States
159	KOTC: Super Stars	August 13, 2009	San Manuel Indian Bingo and Casino	Highland, California, United States
158	KOTC: Gunslinger	August 8, 2009	Lucky Star Casino	Concho, Oklahoma, United States
157	KOTC: Gate Keeper	August 1, 2009	Inn of the Mountain Gods Resort & Casino	Mescalero, New Mexico, United States
156	KOTC: Disputed	July 25, 2009	Kewadin Casino	Sault Ste. Marie, Michigan, United States
155	KOTC: Connection	July 18, 2009	Lake of the Torches	Lac du Flambeau, Wisconsin, United States
154	KOTC: The Renewal	June 20, 2009	Tyndall Armory	Indianapolis, United States
153	KOTC: Encore	June 19, 2009	Soaring Eagle Casino & Resort	Mount Pleasant, Michigan, United States
152	KOTC: Militia	June 11, 2009	San Manuel Indian Bingo and Casino	San Bernardino, California, United States
151	KOTC: Legends	June 6, 2009	Quechan Casino	Winterhaven, California, United States
150	KOTC: Retribution II	May 30, 2009	Inn of the Mountain Gods Resort & Casino	Mescalero, New Mexico, United States
149	KOTC: El Lobo	May 23, 2009	Ute Mountain Casino Hotel & Resort	Towaoc, Colorado, United States
148	KOTC: Storm	May 16, 2009	Diamond Stadium	Lake Elsinore, California, United States
147	KOTC: Battle on the Bay	April 18, 2009	Leelanau Sands Casino	Peshawbestown, Michigan, United States
146	KOTC: Insanity	April 4, 2009	Lake of the Torches	Lac du Flambeau, Wisconsin, United States
145	KOTC: Invincible	March 27, 2009	Georgia International Convention Center	Atlanta, United States
144	KOTC: Border Wars	March 21, 2009	MBT Expo Center	Monroe, Michigan, United States
143	KOTC: Dividing Lines	March 14, 2009	Kewadin Casino	Sault Ste. Marie, Michigan, United States
142	KOTC: Last Resort	March 14, 2009	Avi Resort & Casino	Laughlin, Nevada, United States
141	KOTC: New Breed	March 7, 2009	Inn of the Mountain Gods Resort & Casino	Mescalero, New Mexico, United States
140	KOTC: Rapture	February 28, 2009	Ute Mountain Casino Hotel & Resort	Towaoc, Colorado, United States
139	KOTC: Northern Lights	February 28, 2009	Northern Lights Casino	Walker, Minnesota, United States
138	KOTC: Immortal	February 26, 2009	San Manuel Indian Bingo and Casino	Highland, California, United States
137	KOTC: Hurricane	February 21, 2009	War Memorial Auditorium	Fort Lauderdale, Florida, United States
136	KOTC: Impulse	January 17, 2009	Chevrolet Centre	Youngstown, Ohio, United States
135	KOTC: Fusion	January 17, 2009	Soaring Eagle Casino & Resort	Mount Pleasant, Michigan, United States
134	KOTC: Prowler	December 11, 2008	San Manuel Indian Bingo and Casino	Highland, California, United States
133	KOTC: Goodfellas	December 6, 2008	Isleta Casino & Resort	Albuquerque, New Mexico, United States
132	KOTC: Anticipation	November 26, 2008	Soaring Eagle Casino & Resort	Mount Pleasant, Michigan, United States
131	KOTC: Bragging Rights	November 20, 2008	Ohio Expo Center Coliseum	Columbus, Ohio, United States
130	KOTC: Frost Bite	November 7, 2008	Kewadin Casino	Sault Ste. Marie, Michigan, United States
129	KOTC: Level One	October 18, 2008	Lake of the Torches	Lac du Flambeau, Wisconsin, United States
128	KOTC: Misconduct	October 16, 2008	San Manuel Indian Bingo and Casino	Highland, California, United States
127	KOTC: Cage Masters	October 4, 2008	Avi Resort & Casino	Laughlin, Nevada, United States
126	KOTC: Retribution	August 30, 2008	Ute Mountain Casino Hotel & Resort	Towaoc, Colorado, United States
125	KOTC: Bio Hazard	August 14, 2008	San Manuel Indian Bingo and Casino	Highland, California, United States
124	KOTC: Rock Solid	July 19, 2008	Lake of the Torches	Lac du Flambeau, Wisconsin, United States
123	KOTC: Badlands	July 12, 2008	Isleta Casino & Resort	Albuquerque, New Mexico, United States
122	KOTC: Settlement	June 13, 2008	Soaring Eagle Casino & Resort	Mount Pleasant, Michigan, United States
121	KOTC: Smashing Machine	May 31, 2008	Ute Mountain Casino Hotel & Resort	Towaoc, Colorado, United States
120	KOTC: Rising Stars	May 24, 2008	Kiowa Casino	Devol, Oklahoma, United States
119	KOTC: Reckless	May 17, 2008	Harlow's Casino Resort	Greenville, Mississippi, United States
118	KOTC: Opposing Force	May 15, 2008	San Manuel Indian Bingo and Casino	Highland, California, United States
117	KOTC: Fight Nite @ The Shrine	April 19, 2008	N/A	N/A
116	KOTC: Twisted	April 5, 2008	N/A	Albuquerque, New Mexico, United States
115	KOTC: Tsunami II	March 27, 2008	San Manuel Indian Bingo and Casino	Highland, California, United States
114	KOTC: Protege	March 22, 2008	Avi Resort & Casino	Laughlin, Nevada, United States
113	KOTC: All Wisconsin Fight Quest	March 15, 2008	Lake of the Torches	Lac du Flambeau, Wisconsin, United States
112	KOTC: Stand Off	February 22, 2008	Soaring Eagle Casino & Resort	Mount Pleasant, Michigan, United States
111	KOTC: Warlords	February 9, 2008	Ute Mountain Casino Hotel & Resort	Towaoc, Colorado, United States
110	KOTC: Premiere	January 24, 2008	San Manuel Indian Bingo and Casino	Highland, California, United States
109	KOTC: Sub Zero	January 12, 2008	Lake of the Torches	Lac du Flambeau, Wisconsin, United States
108	KOTC: Final Chapter	December 2, 2007	Soboba Casino	San Jacinto, California, United States
107	KOTC: Bad Boys	November 21, 2007	Soaring Eagle Casino & Resort	Mount Pleasant, Michigan, United States
106	KOTC: Damage Inc.	November 17, 2007	Rockford MetroCentre	Rockford, Illinois, United States
105	KOTC: Arch Rivals	October 27, 2007	Reno Events Center	Reno, Nevada, United States
104	KOTC: Hierarchy	October 13, 2007	Isleta Casino & Resort	Albuquerque, New Mexico, United States
103	KOTC: Point of No Return	October 7, 2007	Soboba Casino	San Jacinto, California, United States
102	KOTC: Brimstone	October 6, 2007	Lake of the Torches Resort Casino	Lac du Flambeau, Wisconsin, United States
101	KOTC: Perth	October 5, 2007	Perth Convention and Exhibition Centre	Perth, Australia
100	KOTC: Jawbreaker	September 29, 2007	Kiowa Casino	Devol, Oklahoma, United States
99	KOTC: Unstoppable	September 15, 2007	Apache Gold Casino	Globe, Arizona, United States
98	KOTC: River Rage	September 15, 2007	Avi Resort & Casino	Laughlin, Nevada, United States
97	KOTC: Collision Course	August 5, 2007	Soboba Casino	San Jacinto, California, United States
96	KOTC: Battle at the Bowl	July 21, 2007	Lake of the Torches	Lac du Flambeau, Wisconsin, United States
95	KOTC: No Holds Barred	July 14, 2007	Eagle Mountain Casino	Porterville, California, United States
94	KOTC: Explosion	June 15, 2007	Soaring Eagle Casino & Resort	Mount Pleasant, Michigan, United States
93	KOTC: Reincarnated	June 9, 2007	Auburn RSL	Auburn, Sydney, Australia
92	KOTC: Epicenter	June 8, 2007	Soboba Casino	San Jacinto, California, United States
91	KOTC: Eliminator	June 2, 2007	Kiowa Casino	Devol, Oklahoma, United States
90	KOTC: Damage Control	May 26, 2007	UIC Pavilion	Chicago, Illinois, United States
89	KOTC: Eclipse	May 26, 2007	Apache Gold Casino	Globe, Arizona, United States
88	KOTC: Sinister	April 27, 2007	Soboba Casino	San Jacinto, California, United States
87	KOTC: Caged Chaos	March 10, 2007	Avi Resort & Casino	Laughlin, Nevada, United States
86	KOTC: Mass Destruction	January 26, 2007	Soaring Eagle Casino & Resort	Mount Pleasant, Michigan, United States
85	KOTC: Hard Knocks	January 19, 2007	Rockford MetroCentre	Rockford, Illinois, United States
84	KOTC: Destroyer	December 1, 2006	Soboba Casino	San Jacinto, California, United States
83	KOTC: Cyclone	November 11, 2006	Osage Casino	Tulsa, Oklahoma, United States
82	KOTC: All Stars	October 28, 2006	Reno Events Center	Reno, Nevada, United States
81	KOTC: BOOYAA	October 13, 2006	Soboba Casino	San Jacinto, California, United States
80	KOTC: Meltdown	October 7, 2006	Murat Theater	Indianapolis, United States
79	KOTC: Rapid Fire	August 4, 2006	Soboba Casino	San Jacinto, California, United States
78	KOTC: Civil War	July 29, 2006	Ute Mountain Casino Hotel & Resort	Towaoc, Colorado, United States
77	KOTC: Shoot Out	July 22, 2006	Tulalip Resort Casino	Seattle, United States
76	KOTC: Australia	July 8, 2006	N/A	Australia
75	KOTC: Mangler	June 9, 2006	Soboba Casino	San Jacinto, California, United States
74	KOTC: Predator	May 13, 2006	Apache Gold Casino	Globe, Arizona, United States
73	KOTC: Unfinished Business	April 28, 2006	N/A	Sydney, Australia
72	KOTC: Heavy Hitters	April 2, 2006	Chukchansi Gold Resort & Casino	Coarsegold, California, United States
71	KOTC: The Return 2	March 25, 2006	Soboba Casino	San Jacinto, California, United States
70	KOTC: The Return	March 19, 2006	Soboba Casino	San Jacinto, California, United States
69	KOTC: Drop Zone	March 18, 2006	Soaring Eagle Casino	Mount Pleasant, Michigan, United States
68	KOTC: Battle at Ute Mountain	March 4, 2006	Ute Mountain Casino Hotel & Resort	Towaoc, Colorado, United States
67	KOTC: Redemption on the River	February 17, 2006	Mark of the Quad-Cities	Moline, Illinois, United States
66	KOTC: Gunfather	February 10, 2006	Evan Theatre	Penrith, New South Wales, Australia
65	KOTC: Outlaws	January 21, 2006	Apache Gold Casino	Globe, Arizona, United States
64	KOTC 64: Raging Bull	December 16, 2005	Agora Theater	Cleveland, Ohio, United States
63	KOTC 63: Final Conflict	December 2, 2005	Soboba Casino	San Jacinto, California, United States
62	KOTC: Execution Day	October 29, 2005	Silver Legacy Reno	Reno, Nevada, United States
61	KOTC 61: Flash Point	September 23, 2005	Soboba Casino	San Jacinto, California, United States
60	KOTC: Xtreme Edge	September 17, 2005	Edge Sports Complex	Indianapolis, Indiana, United States
59	KOTC 58: Prime Time	August 5, 2005	Soboba Casino	San Jacinto, California, United States
58	KOTC: Socorro	July 23, 2005	N/A	Socorro, New Mexico, United States
57	KOTC 56: Caliente	July 9, 2005	Apache Gold Casino	Globe, Arizona, United States
56	KOTC: Warzone	June 24, 2005	IceSheffield	Sheffield, England
55	KOTC 55: Grudge Match	June 17, 2005	Kiva Auditorium	Albuquerque, New Mexico, United States
54	KOTC 54: Mucho Machismo	June 12, 2005	Soboba Casino	San Jacinto, California, United States
53	KOTC: Red Rock	May 21, 2005	Red Rock State Park	Gallup, New Mexico, United States
52	KOTC: Mortal Sins	May 7, 2005	Buffalo Bill's	Primm, Nevada, United States
51	KOTC 51: Natural Disaster	April 15, 2005	El Paso County Coliseum	El Paso, Texas, United States
50	KOTC 50: First Blood	March 26, 2005	National Guard Armory	Socorro, New Mexico, United States
49	KOTC 49: Soboba	March 20, 2005	N/A	San Jacinto, California, United States
48	KOTC 48: Payback	February 25, 2005	N/A	Cleveland, Ohio, United States
47	KOTC 47: Uprising	February 5, 2005	Albuquerque Convention Center	Albuquerque, New Mexico, United States
46	KOTC: Australia	February 4, 2005	N/A	Australia
45	KOTC: Hostile Takeover	December 4, 2004	Sky City Casino	Acoma Pueblo, New Mexico, United States
44	KOTC 45: King of the Cage 45	November 20, 2004	Belterra Casino Resort & Spa	Florence, Indiana, United States
43	KOTC 44: Revenge	November 14, 2004	Soboba Casino	San Jacinto, California, United States
42	KOTC: Sunland Park	October 29, 2004	Sunland Park Racetrack & Casino	Sunland Park, New Mexico, United States
41	KOTC 42: Buckeye Nuts	October 23, 2004	Hara Arena	Dayton, Ohio, United States
40	KOTC 41: Relentless	September 29, 2004	Soboba Casino	San Jacinto, California, United States
39	KOTC: New Mexico	August 28, 2004	Sky City Casino	Acoma Pueblo, New Mexico, United States
38	KOTC 39: Hitmaster	August 6, 2004	Soboba Casino	San Jacinto, California, United States
37	KOTC 37: Unfinished Business	June 12, 2004	Soboba Casino	San Jacinto, California, United States
36	KOTC 36: Albuquerque	May 15, 2004	Sky City Casino	Acoma Pueblo, New Mexico, United States
35	KOTC 35: Acoma	February 28, 2004	Sky City Casino	Acoma Pueblo, New Mexico, United States
34	KOTC 34: Ohio	February 28, 2004	Canton Memorial Civic Center	Canton, Ohio, United States
33	KOTC 33: After Shock	February 20, 2004	Soboba Casino	San Jacinto, California, United States
32	KOTC 32: Bringing Heat	January 24, 2004	Office Depot Center	Sunrise, Florida, United States
31	KOTC 31: King of the Cage 31	December 6, 2003	Soboba Casino	San Jacinto, California, United States
30	KOTC 30: The Pinnacle	November 12, 2003	Pala Casino Spa Resort	Pala, California, United States
29	KOTC 29: Renegades	September 5, 2003	Soboba Casino	San Jacinto, California, United States
28	KOTC 28: More Punishment	August 16, 2003	N/A	Reno, Nevada, United States
27	KOTC 27: Aftermath	August 10, 2003	Saboba Casino	San Jacinto, California, United States
26	KOTC 26: Gladiator Challenge	August 3, 2003	Sky City Casino	Acoma Pueblo, New Mexico, United States
25	KOTC 25: Flaming Fury	June 29, 2003	Soboba Casino	San Jacinto, California, United States
24	KOTC 24: Mayhem	June 14, 2003	N/A	Albuquerque, New Mexico, United States
23	KOTC 23: Sin City	May 16, 2003	Orleans Hotel Casino	Las Vegas, Nevada, United States
22	KOTC 22: Steel Warrior	March 23, 2003	Soboba Casino	San Jacinto, California, United States
21	KOTC 21: Invasion	February 21, 2003	Santa Ana Star Casino	Bernalillo, New Mexico, United States
20	KOTC 20: Crossroads	December 15, 2002	Santa Ana Star Casino	Bernalillo, New Mexico, United States
19	KOTC 19: Street Fighter	December 7, 2002	Soboba Casino	San Jacinto, California, United States
18	KOTC 18: Sudden Impact	November 1, 2002	Silver Legacy Reno	Reno, Nevada, United States
17	KOTC 17: Nuclear Explosion	October 19, 2002	Soboba Casino	San Jacinto, California, United States
16	KOTC 16: Double Cross	August 2, 2002	Soboba Casino	San Jacinto, California, United States
15	KOTC 15: Bad Intentions	June 22, 2002	Soboba Casino	San Jacinto, California, United States
14	KOTC 14: 5150	June 19, 2002	Santa Ana Star Casino	Bernalillo, New Mexico, United States
13	KOTC 13: Revolution	May 17, 2002	Silver Legacy Reno	Reno, Nevada, United States
12	KOTC 12: Cold Blood	February 9, 2002	Soboba Casino	San Jacinto, California, United States
11	KOTC 11: Domination	September 29, 2001	Soboba Casino	San Jacinto, California, United States
10	KOTC 10: Critical Mass	August 4, 2001	Soboba Casino	San Jacinto, California, United States
9	KOTC 9: Showtime	June 23, 2001	Soboba Casino	San Jacinto, California, United States
8	KOTC 8: Bombs Away	April 29, 2001	Colusa Casino	Williams, California, United States
7	KOTC 7: Wet and Wild	February 24, 2001	Soboba Casino	San Jacinto, California, United States
6	KOTC 6: Road Warriors	November 29, 2000	Soaring Eagle Casino & Resort	Mount Pleasant, Michigan, United States
5	KOTC 5: Cage Wars	September 16, 2000	Soboba Casino	San Jacinto, California, United States
4	KOTC 4: Gladiators	June 24, 2000	Soboba Casino	San Jacinto, California, United States
3	KOTC 3: Knockout Nightmare	April 15, 2000	Soboba Casino	San Jacinto, California, United States
2	KOTC 2: Desert Storm	February 5, 2000	Soboba Casino	San Jacinto, California, United States
1	Bas Rutten's King of the Cage	October 30, 1999	Soboba Casino	San Jacinto, California, United States

== See also ==
- King of the Cage
- List of King of the Cage champions
