= 2011 in King of the Cage =

Mixed martial arts events

Information
- First date: January 15, 2011
- Last date: December 17, 2011

Events
- Total events: 39

Fights
- Total fights: 408
- Title fights: 18

Chronology
2010 in KOTC	2011 in King of the Cage	2012 in KOTC

The year 2011 is the 13th year in the history of King of the Cage, a mixed martial arts promotion based in the United States. In 2011 King of the Cage held 39 events, KOTC: Confrontation.

== Title fights ==
Title fights in 2011
Weight class				Method	Round	Time	Event	Notes
Bantamweight	Donald Sanchez (c)	def.	Scott Bear	Submission (Guillotine Choke)	1	3:02	KOTC: Confrontation	(Note: For the King of the Cage Bantamweight Championship.)
Super Heavyweight	Esteves Jones	def.	Neil Cooke (c)	TKO (Punches)	1	0:15	KOTC: Empire	(Note: For the King of the Cage Super Heavyweight Championship.)
Flyweight	Jimmie Rivera (c)	def.	Jared Papazian	Decision (Unanimous)	5	5:00	KOTC: Empire	(Note: For the King of the Cage Flyweight Championship.)
Welterweight	Quinn Mulhern (c)	def.	Anselmo Martinez	Submission (Rear-Naked Choke)	1	4:48	KOTC: Texas	(Note: For The King of the Cage Welterweight Championship.)
Middleweight	Brandon Hunt (c)	def.	Kenny Mccorkell	Submission (Kimura)	5	2:33	KOTC: Moral Victory	(Note: For The King of the Cage Middleweight Championship.)
Lightweight	Bobby Green	def.	Dom O'Grady (c)	Decision (Unanimous)	5	5:00	KOTC: Moral Victory	(Note: For the King of the Cage Lightweight Championship.)
Junior Welterweight	Tim Means (c)	def.	Cris Leyva	TKO (Knees and Punches)	3	1:28	KOTC: Fight to Live	(Note: For The King of the Cage Junior Welterweight Championship.)
Heavyweight	Tyler East	def.	Nick Gaston	TKO (Punches)	2	2:40	KOTC: Epic Force	(Note: For the King of the Cage Heavyweight Championship.)
Flyweight	Jared Papazian	def.	Abel Cullum	Decision (Unanimous)	5	5:00	KOTC: Epic Force	(Note: For the King of the Cage Flyweight Championship.)
Welterweight	David Gomez	def.	Brendan Tierney	TKO (Corner Stoppage)	5	2:37	KOTC: Next Generation	(Note: For The King of the Cage Welterweight Championship.)
Cruiserweight	Wes Combs	def.	Boban Simic	Decision (Split)	3	5:00	KOTC: Compression Test	(Note: For the King of the Cage Cruiserweight Championship.)
Bantamweight	Jeremy Spoon	def.	Donald Sanchez (c)	Decision (Split)	5	5:00	KOTC: Overdrive	(Note: For the King of the Cage Bantamweight Championship.)
Junior Welterweight	Tim Means (c)	def.	Cody Pfister	Submission (Rear-Naked Choke)	1	2:15	KOTC: Kingpin	(Note: For The King of the Cage Junior Welterweight Championship.)
Flyweight	Jared Papazian (c)	def.	Marvin Garcia	Decision (Unanimous)	5	5:00	KOTC: First Defense	(Note: For the King of the Cage Flyweight Championship.)
Super Heavyweight	Tony Lopez	def.	Esteves Jones (c)	Submission (Rear-Naked Choke)	4	3:30	KOTC: Apocalypse	(Note: For the King of the Cage Super Heavyweight Championship.)
Welterweight	Bill Albrecht	def.	David Gomez (c)	Submission (Armbar)	2	3:55	KOTC: Apocalypse	(Note: For The King of the Cage Welterweight Championship.)
Middleweight	Brandon Hunt (c)	def.	Angelo Popofski	TKO (Punches)	1	2:10	KOTC: Homecoming	(Note: For The King of the Cage Middleweight Championship.)
Heavyweight	Tony Lopez	def.	Esteves Jones	TKO (Punches)	4	4:04	KOTC: Magnaflow	(Note: For the King of the Cage Heavyweight Championship.)

== Events list ==
#	Event title	Date	Arena	Location
249	KOTC: Steel Curtain	December 17, 2011	Riverwind Casino	Norman, Oklahoma, United States
248	KOTC: Magnaflow	December 15, 2011	San Manuel Indian Bingo and Casino	Highland, California, United States
247	KOTC: Future Legends 4	December 10, 2011	Eastside Cannery	Las Vegas, Nevada, United States
246	KOTC: Winter Warriors	December 10, 2011	Northern Lights Casino	Walker, Minnesota, United States
245	KOTC: High Performance	November 19, 2011	Buffalo Thunder Casino and Resort	Santa Fe, New Mexico, United States
244	KOTC: Cage Quest	November 12, 2011	Gold Country Casino and Hotel	Oroville, California, United States
243	KOTC: Underground 72	November 12, 2011	Kewadin Casino	Sault Ste. Marie, Michigan, United States
242	KOTC: Underground 71	October 15, 2011	Ute Mountain Casino Hotel & Resort	Towaoc, Colorado, United States
241	KOTC: Interference	October 8, 2011	Lake of the Torches	Lac du Flambeau, Wisconsin, United States
240	KOTC: Homecoming	September 24, 2011	Soaring Eagle Casino & Resort	Mount Pleasant, Michigan, United States
239	KOTC: Apocalypse	September 17, 2011	WinStar World Casino	Thackerville, Oklahoma, United States
238	KOTC: First Defense	September 15, 2011	San Manuel Indian Bingo and Casino	Highland, California, United States
237	KOTC: Rising Sun	September 10, 2011	Buffalo Thunder Casino and Resort	Santa Fe, New Mexico, United States
236	KOTC: Future Legends 3	September 3, 2011	Eastside Cannery	Las Vegas, Nevada, United States
235	KOTC: Underground 70	August 27, 2011	Leelanau Sands Casino	Peshawbestown, Michigan, United States
234	KOTC: Kingpin	August 27, 2011	Lubbock Memorial Civic Center	Lubbock, Texas, United States
233	KOTC: Overdrive	August 20, 2011	Riverwind Casino	Norman, Oklahoma, United States
232	KOTC: Demolition	August 6, 2011	Northern Lights Casino	Walker, Minnesota, United States
231	KOTC: Compression Test	July 23, 2011	Lake of the Torches	Lac du Flambeau, Wisconsin, United States
230	KOTC: Shockwave	July 23, 2011	Gold Country Casino and Hotel	Oroville, California, United States
229	KOTC: Underground 69	July 16, 2011	Dream Makers Theater	Sault Ste. Marie, Michigan, United States
228	KOTC: High Altitude	July 16, 2011	Ute Mountain Casino Hotel & Resort	Towaoc, Colorado, United States
227	KOTC: Next Generation	June 30, 2011	San Manuel Indian Bingo and Casino	Highland, California, United States
226	KOTC: D-Day	June 25, 2011	Royal Oak Music Theatre	Royal Oak, Michigan, United States
225	KOTC: Epic Force	June 24, 2011	WinStar World Casino	Thackerville, Oklahoma, United States
224	KOTC: Future Legends 2	June 4, 2011	Eastside Cannery	Las Vegas, Nevada, United States
223	KOTC: Fight to Live	May 14, 2011	San Manuel Indian Bingo and Casino	San Bernardino, California, United States
222	KOTC: Moral Victory	April 21, 2011	San Manuel Indian Bingo and Casino	San Bernardino, California, United States
221	KOTC: Underground 68	April 16, 2011	Leelanau Sands Casino	Peshawbestown, Michigan, United States
220	KOTC: Texas	April 16, 2011	N/A	Lubbock, Texas, United States
219	KOTC: Outkasts	April 9, 2011	Lake of the Torches	Lac du Flambeau, Wisconsin, United States
218	KOTC: Underground 67	April 2, 2011	Ute Mountain Casino Hotel & Resort	Towaoc, Colorado, United States
217	KOTC: Underground 66	April 2, 2011	Kewadin Casino	Sault Ste. Marie, Michigan, United States
216	KOTC: Turning Point	March 27, 2011	Braemar Country Club	Tarzana, Los Angeles, California, United States
215	KOTC: Future Legends	March 5, 2011	Eastside Cannery	Las Vegas, Nevada, United States
214	KOTC: Northern Meltdown	February 19, 2011	Northern Lights Casino	Walker, Minnesota, United States
213	KOTC: Empire	February 3, 2011	San Manuel Indian Bingo and Casino	San Bernardino, California, United States
212	KOTC: Underground 65	January 22, 2011	Ute Mountain Casino Hotel & Resort	Towaoc, Colorado, United States
211	KOTC: Confrontation	January 15, 2011	Buffalo Thunder Casino and Resort	Santa Fe, New Mexico, United States

== KOTC: Confrontation ==
KOTC: Confrontation was an event held on January 15, 2011 at the Buffalo Thunder Resort & Casino in Santa Fe, New Mexico.

=== Results ===
Main Card
Weight class				Method	Round	Time	Notes
Bantamweight	Donald Sanchez (c)	def.	Scott Bear	Submission (Guillotine Choke)	1	3:02	(Note: For the King of the Cage Bantamweight Championship.)
	Frank Baca	def.	Lewis McKenzie	TKO (Punches)	3	2:35
	Nate Vorel	def.	Gene Perez	Submission (Head & Arm Choke)	1	4:42
	Frank Morris	def.	Nathaniel Baker	Submission (Armbar)	1	3:52
	Melvin Costa	def.	Eric McElroy	TKO (Punches)	1	2:13
	Nick Piedmont	def.	Anthony Griego	Decision (Unanimous)	3	5:00
	Bill Albrecht	def.	Carlos Lopez	Submission (Armbar)	1	1:18
	Lorenzo Coca	def.	Joe Salazar	Submission (Rear-Naked Choke)	1	1:43
	Jeremy Oyenque	def.	Adam Apodaca	Decision (Unanimous)	3	3:00
	Reba Klimt	def.	Zuhey Quezeda Harris	Decision (Unanimous)	3	3:00
	Trey Solomon	def.	Fabian Vasquez	Submission (Kimura)	1	1:14
	Jesse Jaramillo	def.	Greg Varela	TKO (Punches)	1	1:04
	Skyler Pendleton	def.	P.J. Jaramillo	Decision (Unanimous)	3	3:00

== KOTC: Underground 65 ==
KOTC: Underground 65 was an event held on January 22, 2011 at the Ute Mountain Casino in Towaoc, Colorado.

=== Results ===
Main Card
Weight class				Method	Round	Time	Notes
	Billy Colon	def.	Isaque Martinez	Submission (Armbar)	2	3:35
	Ricky Musgrave	def.	Oliver Parker	Decision (Unanimous)	3	5:00
	Grant Hobbs	def.	Rudy Kennedy	TKO (Punches)	1	1:52
	Jeremy Osheim	def.	Jerry Castillo	Submission (Rear-Naked Choke)	1	0:54
	Tim Sosa	def.	Kevin Wirth	Submission (Armbar)	1	2:41
	Corey Jagger	def.	Dominic Gustamantes	Submission (Armbar)	1	2:14
	Luis Fernandez	def.	Dusty Dasugo	Submission (Rear-Naked Choke)	3	0:32
	Ambrose Teasyatwho	def.	Joe Hammons	Decision (Unanimous)	3	3:00
	Kasey Yates	def.	Manny Ruiz	TKO (Retirement)	2	3:00
	Zach Larimore	def.	Adrian Yazzi	Decision (Unanimous)	3	3:00
	Josh King	def.	Hector Salliant	Decision (Split)	3	3:00
	Gabe Chavez	def.	Dominic Gurule	Decision (Unanimous)	3	3:00

== KOTC: Empire ==
KOTC: Empire was an event held on February 3, 2011 at the San Manuel Casino in San Bernardino, California.

=== Results ===
Main Card
Weight class				Method	Round	Time	Notes
Super Heavyweight	Esteves Jones	def.	Neil Cooke (c)	TKO (Punches)	1	0:15	(Note: For the King of the Cage Super Heavyweight Championship.)
Flyweight	Jimmie Rivera (c)	def.	Jared Papazian	Decision (Unanimous)	5	5:00	(Note: For the King of the Cage Flyweight Championship.)
	Kenny McCorkell	def.	Jonathan Brandon	TKO (Punches)	1	2:26
	Paul Arras	def.	Demetrice Woods	Submission (Punches)	1	0:50
	Chris Camacho	def.	Erin Beach	TKO (Punches)	3	2:09
	Michael Parker	def.	Kana Hyatt	Submission (Guillotine Choke)	2	1:22
	Joe Williams	def.	Daniel Mancha	TKO (Punches)	2	2:06
	Kris Armbrister	def.	Andrew Pena	TKO (Elbows)	2	1:30

== KOTC: Northern Meltdown ==
KOTC: Northern Meltdown was an event held on February 19, 2011 at the Northern Lights Casino in Walker, Minnesota.

=== Results ===
Main Card
Weight class				Method	Round	Time	Notes
	Lucas Goulet	def.	Bruce Johnson	Submission (Punches)	1	4:21
	Randy Kittelson	def.	Joel Wales	Submission (Punches)	1	2:57
	Geshik Martin	def.	John Fioeck	Decision (Unanimous)	3	3:00
	Garrett Olson	def.	R.T. Hicks	Submission (Keylock)	1	1:21
	Daniel Wales	def.	Jarad Howard	Submission (Rear-Naked Choke)	1	1:21
	Chandra Engel	def.	Katherine Richter	Submission (Armbar)	2	2:55
	J.J. Holloway	def.	Dustin Campbell	TKO (Punches)	1	0:24
	Eli Finn	def.	Travis Smith	Submission (Rear-Naked Choke)	1	2:30
	Mike Garcia	def.	Kory Hueper	TKO (Punches)	1	0:26
	David Lovely	def.	Alex Busher	Submission (Rear-Naked Choke)	1	1:24
	Jake Henrickson	def.	Kyle Hueper	Submission (Rear-Naked Choke)	1	2:54
	Robbie Gotreau	def.	Paul Hesch	TKO (Punches)	1	0:35
	Marc Hummel	def.	Kevin Campbell	TKO (Punches)	1	0:48

== KOTC: Future Legends ==
KOTC: Future Legends was an event held on March 5, 2011 at the Eastside Cannery Casino and Hotel in Las Vegas, Nevada.

=== Results ===
Main Card
Weight class				Method	Round	Time	Notes
	Andrew Yates	def.	Tim Sosa	Decision (Split)	3	3:00
	Tom Cruz	def.	James Flores	Decision (Split)	3	3:00
	Antonio Sanchez	def.	Ross Bradshaw	Submission (Armbar)	1	2:52
	John Medina	def.	Jeff Scales	Submission (Rear-Naked Choke)	1	0:32
	Walter Hayes	def.	Josh Fry	KO (Punch)	1	1:02
	Aaron Williams	def.	Effren Carrera	TKO (Punches)	2	0:38
	Bercharis McGill	def.	Matt Dahlkemper	Decision (Split)	3	3:00
	Abraham Perez	def.	Thomas Pando	TKO (Punches)	2	0:38
	Jacob Faamaile Malili	def.	Frank Hayden	Decision (Unanimous)	3	3:00
	Jered Lowe	def.	Andrew Duarte	Submission (Rear-Naked Choke)	2	0:50
	Daniel Cuison	def.	Clayton Vanbuskirk	Decision (Unanimous)	3	3:00
	Kurt Crum	def.	John Overland	Submission (Rear-Naked Choke)	2	1:18
	Tom Wyatt	def.	Ralph Olivio	TKO (Punches)	1	1:57
	Justin Bonner	def.	Jeff Beck	TKO (Punches)	2	0:41
	Sean Cantor	def.	Daniel Langford	TKO (Punches)	2	1:19
	Shane Benbow	def.	Dustin Werner	TKO (Punches)	1	0:17

== KOTC: Turning Point ==
KOTC: Turning Point was an event held on March 27, 2011 at the Braemar Country Club in Tarzana, California.

=== Results ===
Main Card
Weight class				Method	Round	Time	Notes
	Jared Papazian	def.	Kana Hyatt	Decision (Unanimous)	3	5:00
	Jamie Toney	def.	Preston Scharf	Submission (Rear-Naked Choke)	2	1:42
	Ronda Rousey	def.	Ediane Gomes	Submission (Armbar)	1	0:25
	Rob Gooch	def.	Ty Freeman	Decision (Split)	3	3:00
	Martin Gantt	def.	John Hahn	Decision (Unanimous)	3	3:00
	Eric Winston	def.	Keenan Lewis	Submission (Heel Hook)	1	0:30
	Daniel Clark	def.	Jeremy Ramage	KO (Punch)	1	0:23
	Alberto Crane	def.	Gabe Rivas	Submission (Armbar)	1	2:23

== KOTC: Underground 66 ==
KOTC: Underground 66 was an event held on April 2, 2011 at the Kewadin Casino in Sault Ste Marie, Michigan.

=== Results ===
Main Card
Weight class				Method	Round	Time	Notes
	Nick Gaston	def.	Jerry Burns	TKO (Punches)	1	2:34
	Chad Herrick	def.	Jason Fish	Submission (Rear-Naked Choke)	1	2:07
	Ray Gowlet	def.	Blaine Bailey	TKO (Punches)	1	3:45
	Denato Richardson	def.	Mitch Rosted	TKO (Punches)	1	0:43
	John Thieubault	def.	Pat Gionette	TKO (Punches)	3	1:04
	Eric Sandy	def.	Jimmy Lyons	Submission (Rear-Naked Choke)	1	0:40
	Rustin Jones	def.	Ryan Harris	Submission (Rear-Naked Choke)	1	1:43
	Richard Wells	def.	Matt Tasker	Submission (Armbar)	1	1:22
	Adrian Vilaca	def.	Bill Bailey	Submission (Triangle Choke)	1	1:30
	Gary Conradson	def.	Larry Gordon-Badillo	Decision (Unanimous)	3	3:00
	Gabe Goneau	def.	Brandon Killip	TKO (Punches)	2	0:14
	Travis McCleod	def.	Adam Foor	Submission (Rear-Naked Choke)	1	1:13

== KOTC: Underground 67 ==
KOTC: Underground 67 was an event held on April 2, 2011 at the Ute Mountain Casino in Cortez, Colorado.

=== Results ===
Main Card
Weight class				Method	Round	Time	Notes
	Treston Thomison	def.	Cris Leyva	Submission (Armbar)	1	2:13
	Oliver Parker	def.	Mark Korzenowski	Decision (Split)	3	5:00
	Grant Hobbs	def.	Shelby Rice	Submission (Armbar)	1	2:59
	Jeremy Osheim	def.	Taylor Allison	KO (Punch)	1	0:59
	Gabe Eacker	def.	Ambrose Teasyatwho	Decision (Unanimous)	3	3:00
	Tim Sosa	def.	Joey Eisenbraun	Submission (Rear-Naked Choke)	2	2:38
	Rudy Kennedy	def.	Nick McNulty	Submission (Rear-Naked Choke)	1	1:49
	Timo Molina	def.	Dominic Gustamantes	Submission (Triangle Choke)	1	2:27
	Kevin Wirth	def.	Daniel Peterson	Submission (Rear-Naked Choke)	1	0:49
	Charlie Williams	def.	Adrian Yazzi	Decision (Unanimous)	3	3:00

== KOTC: Outkasts ==
KOTC: Outkasts was an event held on April 9, 2011 at the Lake of the Torches Casino in Lac Du Flambeau, Wisconsin.

=== Results ===
Main Card
Weight class				Method	Round	Time	Notes
	Jameel Massouh	def.	Steve Kinnison	Submission (Twister)	1	1:27
	Dallas O'Malley	def.	Karl Turek	Decision (Split)	3	5:00
	Charon Spain	def.	Ken Sitsler	Submission (Kimura)	1	1:39
	Jason Mills	def.	Adam Kope	Submission (Rear-Naked Choke)	1	4:57
	Thomas Soto	def.	Joe Krus	Decision (Unanimous)	3	5:00
	Ruddy Gray	def.	Evian Rodriguez	TKO (Punches)	1	3:20
	Moriel Charneski	def.	Katie Maki	TKO (Punches)	2	2:48
	Jeffrey Watts	def.	Alexander Wilbur	Submission (Rear-Naked Choke)	1	1:20
	Mike Myers	def.	Richard Denonnie	Submission (Guillotine Choke)	2	0:20
	Shane Cadotte	def.	Rusty Defoe	Submission (Arm-Triangle Choke)	3	2:25
	Kevin Barthman	def.	Brandon Adams	TKO (Punches)	1	0:19
	Ryan White	def.	Christopher Hicks	Submission	2	2:21
	Adam Merrill	def.	Jason Jungers	Decision (Unanimous)	3	3:00
	Mike Geldon	def.	Jon Anderson	TKO (Punches)	1	2:42

== KOTC: Texas ==
KOTC: Texas was an event held on April 16, 2011 in Lubbock, Texas, notable for Dan Severn securing his 100th professional win.

=== Results ===
Main Card
Weight class				Method	Round	Time	Notes
Welterweight	Quinn Mulhern (c)	def.	Anselmo Martinez	Submission (Rear-Naked Choke)	1	4:48	(Note: For The King of the Cage Welterweight Championship.)
	Josh Hill	def.	Louis Sims	Submission	1	0:51
	Zach Haney	def.	Jerardo Botello	Submission (Guillotine Choke)	2	0:13
	Dan Severn	def.	Aaron Garcia	Submission (Neck Crank)	1	2:18
	Bill Albrecht	def.	Patrick Dixon	Submission (Triangle Choke)	1	3:36
	Matt Espinoza	def.	Jeremiah Castillo	Decision (Unanimous)	3	3:00
	Mark Martinez	def.	Josh Luna	KO (Punch)	2	0:10
	Adenilson Clementino	def.	Joel Traves	KO (Punch)	2	0:12
	Javier Rubio	def.	Aaron Cantu	Submission (Rear-Naked Choke)	2	1:37
	Nathan Torrez	def.	Michael Casteel	Submission (Rear-Naked Choke)	1	2:47

== KOTC: Underground 68 ==
KOTC: Underground 68 was an event held on April 16, 2011 at the Leelanau Sands Casino in Peshawbestown, Michigan.

=== Results ===
Main Card
Weight class				Method	Round	Time	Notes
	Christos Piliafas	def.	Will Crockett	TKO (Punches)	1	1:37
	Eric Moon	def.	Chris Fernette	Submission (Rear-Naked Choke)	1	3:35
	John Schulz	def.	Brian Burgan	TKO (Punches)	2	1:47
	Josh Boyer	def.	Anthony Gott	Submission (Rear-Naked Choke)	2	1:41
	Kameron Snyder	def.	Kelly True	Submission (Rear-Naked Choke)	1	1:41
	Dingo Brown	def.	Anthony Coleman	KO (Punch)	3	0:40
	Theresa Sass	def.	Robin Smith	Decision (Unanimous)	3	3:00
	Ashley Patterson	def.	Paul Kwissa	TKO (Punches)	1	0:45
	Cody Vanklaveren	def.	George Snedden	TKO (Punches)	1	0:51
	Jay Jackson	def.	John Thieubault	TKO (Punches)	1	1:48
	Mitch Rice	def.	Joe Carson	TKO (Punches)	1	2:58
	Rob Kautman	def.	Mike Jamison	Decision (Majority)	3	3:00
	James Lambert	def.	Damien Petty	TKO (Doctor Stoppage)	1	1:04

== KOTC: Moral Victory ==
KOTC: Moral Victory was an event held on April 21, 2011 at the San Manuel Casino in San Bernardino, California.

=== Results ===
Main Card
Weight class				Method	Round	Time	Notes
Middleweight	Brandon Hunt (c)	def.	Kenny Mccorkell	Submission (Kimura)	5	2:33	(Note: For The King of the Cage Middleweight Championship.)
Lightweight	Bobby Green	def.	Dom O'Grady (c)	Decision (Unanimous)	5	5:00	(Note: For the King of the Cage Lightweight Championship.)
	Gerald Lovato	def.	Dave Rivas	KO (Flying Knee)	2	0:07
	Johnny Cisneros	def.	Paul Arras	TKO (Punches)	1	1:42
	David Gomez	def.	Scott Catlin	TKO (Punches)	1	1:24
	Ronald LeBreton Jr.	def.	Jonathan Brandon	TKO (Punches)	2	1:28
	Kris Armbrister	def.	Palika Drummondo	Decision (Unanimous)	3	3:00
	Leonardo Soares	def.	Chris Camacho	Decision (Unanimous)	3	3:00
	Jason Walraven	def.	Kosetatino Tali Sinoti	TKO (Elbows)	2	1:25

== KOTC: Fight to Live ==
KOTC: Fight to Live was an event held on May 14, 2011 at the San Manuel Casino in San Bernardino, California.

=== Results ===
Main Card
Weight class				Method	Round	Time	Notes
Junior Welterweight	Tim Means (c)	def.	Cris Leyva	TKO (Knees and Punches)	3	1:28	(Note: For The King of the Cage Junior Welterweight Championship.)
	Frank Baca	def.	Frank Morris	TKO (Punches)	2	1:07
	Isaque Martinez	def.	Guto Feliciano	Submission (Rear-Naked Choke)	1	2:47
	Brenda Gonzales	def.	Kyane Hampton	TKO (Punches and Elbows)	1	3:51
	Sergio Rodriguez	def.	Kevin Epley	TKO (Punches)	2	0:40
	Dan Gossett	def.	Phil Campanella	TKO (Punches)	1	0:28
	Zuhey Quezeda Harris	def.	Alyssha Garcia	TKO (Punches)	1	2:31
	Grant Hobbs	def.	Skyler Pendleton	Submission (Armbar)	3	1:35
	Brad Richardson	def.	Jerry Castillo	Submission (Punches)	1	1:31
	Ray Martinez	def.	Henry Adame	Submission (Knee Injury)	1	0:14

== KOTC: Future Legends 2 ==
KOTC: Future Legends 2 was an event held on June 4, 2011 at the Eastside Cannery Casino and Hotel in Las Vegas, Nevada.

=== Results ===
Main Card
Weight class				Method	Round	Time	Notes
	Kurt Crum	def.	Robert Hrcka	TKO (Punches)	2	2:56
	Matt Conte	def.	Brenden Upchurch	Submission (Guillotine Choke)	1	0:16
	Aaron Williams	def.	Zack Grossman	Decision (Unanimous)	3	3:00
	Daniel Cuison	def.	Justin Goularte	TKO (Punches)	1	2:17
	James Lanham	def.	Tyler Pavao	Decision (Split)	3	3:00
	Sean Cantor	def.	Richard Malisig	Decision (Unanimous)	3	3:00
	Jacob Faamaile Malili	def.	Frank Hayden	TKO (Punches)	2	0:22
	Kirby McKenzie	def.	Derek Imig	Submission (Guillotine Choke)	1	0:37
	Jose Lopez	def.	Ross Bradshaw	KO (Punch)	1	0:08
	Bridgette Batch	def.	Rebecca Main	TKO (Punches)	1	2:34
	Chris Dial	def.	Casey Clendenen	Submission (Rear-Naked Choke)	1	0:49
	Louis Cruz	def.	Jerry Norris	KO (Punch)	1	0:49
	John Medina	def.	Tyson Hewelu	KO (Punch)	1	0:24
	Khalil Rountree	def.	Niels Berlemann	KO (Punch)	1	0:16
	Chris Hoffman	def.	Javier Guzman	Submission (Rear-Naked Choke)	1	2:41

== KOTC: Epic Force ==
KOTC: Epic Force was an event held on June 24, 2011 at the Winstar Casino in Thackerville, Oklahoma.

=== Results ===
Main Card
Weight class				Method	Round	Time	Notes
Heavyweight	Tyler East	def.	Nick Gaston	TKO (Punches)	2	2:40	(Note: For the King of the Cage Heavyweight Championship.)
Flyweight	Jared Papazian	def.	Abel Cullum	Decision (Unanimous)	5	5:00	(Note: For the King of the Cage Flyweight Championship.)
	Ryan McCurdy	def.	Alex Rojas	KO (Knee)	1	2:33
	Treston Thomison	def.	Scott Bear	Submission (Rear-Naked Choke)	1	1:18
	Bill Albrecht	def.	Brandon Newsome	Submission (Armbar)	1	1:27
	David Roberts	def.	Kirk Gibson	TKO (Punches)	1	0:40
	Hunter Tucker	def.	Kyle Kelley	TKO (Punches)	1	2:27

== KOTC: D-Day ==
KOTC: D-Day was an event held on June 25, 2011 at the Royal Oak Music Theatre in Royal Oak, Michigan, United States.

=== Results ===
Main Card
Weight class				Method	Round	Time	Notes
	Anthony Coleman	def.	Carl Stansfield	TKO (Punches)	1	1:16
	Raylen Davis	def.	Ryan King	Submission (Armbar)	1	1:11
	Amber Ignatowski	def.	Theresa Sass	Submission (Rear-Naked Choke)	1	1:56
	Ruben Baraiac	def.	Sean Tempes	Submission (Guillotine Choke)	1	1:57
	Nick Booth	def.	Yanni Cavis	Decision (Split)	3	3:00
	Derek Williams	def.	Trent McGuffin	Decision (Unanimous)	3	3:00
	David Evans	def.	Billy Ward	TKO (Punches)	1	1:00
	Maria Putman	def.	Christina Danitz	TKO (Punches)	2	1:41
	Osama Abdul	def.	Joe Carson	TKO (Punches)	1	0:27
	Osama Abdul	def.	Tony Bradford	TKO (Punches)	1	1:21
	Mustafa Jordan	def.	Ryan Harris	TKO (Punches)	2	0:57

== KOTC: Next Generation ==
KOTC: Next Generation was an event held on June 30, 2011 at the San Manuel Casino in Highland, California.

=== Results ===
Main Card
Weight class				Method	Round	Time	Notes
Welterweight	David Gomez	def.	Brendan Tierney	TKO (Corner Stoppage)	5	2:37	(Note: For The King of the Cage Welterweight Championship.)
	Kana Hyatt	def.	Bobby Sanchez	Technical Submission (Triangle Choke)	1	1:55
	Marvin Garcia	def.	Shad Smith	Decision (Unanimous)	3	5:00
	Chris Culley	def.	Kris Armbrister	TKO (Punches)	1	2:51
	Jason Gonzalez	def.	Chris Camacho	TKO (Doctor Stoppage)	3	0:33
	Ryan Williams	def.	Kyle York	Decision (Split)	3	3:00
	Matt Conte	def.	Gabriel Lopez	Decision (Unanimous)	3	3:00
	Chris Holdsworth	def.	Juan Rivas	Submission (Armbar)	1	1:29

== KOTC: High Altitude ==
KOTC: High Altitude was an event held on July 16, 2011 at the Ute Mountain Casino in Highland, California.

=== Results ===
Main Card
Weight class				Method	Round	Time	Notes
	Isaque Martinez	def.	Javier Rubio	Submission (Punches)	3	2:52
	Elsie Zwicker	def.	Amylynn Salopek	TKO (Corner Stoppage)	1	5:00

== KOTC: Underground 69 ==
KOTC: Underground 69 was an event held on July 16, 2011 at the Dream Makers Theater in Sault Ste. Marie, Michigan.

=== Results ===
Main Card
Weight class				Method	Round	Time	Notes
	Brent Fryia	def.	Mike Hernandez	Submission (Armbar)	1	1:48
	Ray Lopez	def.	Robert Morrow	TKO (Punches)	1	1:15
	Caleb Grummet	def.	Chris Skoglund	Submission (Guillotine Choke)	1	1:12
	Gabe Goneau	def.	Zach McFarlane	Submission (Armbar)	2	1:19
	James Lambert	def.	Jimmy Lyons	TKO (Retirement)	1	3:00
	Eric Sandy	def.	Joe Cantwell	Submission (Rear-Naked Choke)	1	0:43
	Kyle Custer-Jones	def.	Trevor LeBlanc	Submission (Rear-Naked Choke)	1	1:44
	Chase Marshall	def.	Kyle Waisenen	Decision (Split)	3	3:00
	Pat Gionette	def.	James Ellis	TKO (Punches)	1	1:28
	Dave Bryan	def.	Niroop Sinha	TKO (Punches)	1	2:52
	Taylor Bumstead	def.	John Hughes	Submission (Rear-Naked Choke)	2	2:04

== KOTC: Shockwave ==
KOTC: Shockwave was an event held on July 23, 2011 at the Gold County Casino in Oroville, California.

=== Results ===
Main Card
Weight class				Method	Round	Time	Notes
	Jeremiah Metcalf	def.	Marcus Gaines	Submission (Rear-Naked Choke)	2	2:48
	Matt Muramoto	def.	Charles Bennett	Submission (Rear-Naked Choke)	1	2:48
	Randall Limond	def.	Ben Davis	TKO (Hand Injury)	1	0:50
	Zak Bucia	def.	Nick Christy	TKO (Punches)	2	1:39
	Elaina Maxwell	def.	Angela Samaro	TKO (Elbows)	3	1:00
	Zach Bunnell	def.	Francisco Aviles	Submission (Triangle Choke)	1	1:25
	Robert Johnson	def.	Christopher Magnani	Decision (Unanimous)	3	3:00
	Jairo Chavez	def.	Ray Mesa	TKO (Retirement)	2	3:00
	Steve Lara	def.	Josh Paiva	Decision (Split)	3	3:00
	Brandon Faumui	def.	Matt Rasso	Submission (Armbar)	1	1:18

== KOTC: Compression Test ==
KOTC: Compression Test was an event held on July 23, 2011 at the Lake of the Torches Resort & Casino in Lac du Flambeau, Wisconsin.

=== Results ===
Main Card
Weight class				Method	Round	Time	Notes
Cruiserweight	Wes Combs	def.	Boban Simic	Decision (Split)	3	5:00	(Note: For the King of the Cage Cruiserweight Championship.)
	Jimmy Zidek	def.	Morgan Sickinger	Decision (Split)	3	5:00
	Derrick Kaul	def.	Adam Kope	Submission (Arm-Triangle Choke)	1	2:04
	Dexter Wright	def.	Jon Barker	TKO (Doctor Stoppage)	2	4:26
	Reed Jensen	def.	Taylor Hartman	Submission (Rear-Naked Choke)	1	3:42
	Tony Zelinski	def.	Shane Cadotte	TKO (Punches)	1	3:41
	Heather Bassett	def.	Moriel Charneski	Decision (Unanimous)	3	3:00
	Adam Merrill	def.	Derek Schwartz	Decision (Unanimous)	3	3:00
	Nate Jennerman	def.	Will Pevytoe	TKO (Punches)	2	1:45
	Frank Schuman	def.	Jodi Butkovich	Submission (Guillotine Choke)	1	0:51
	Tom Ahlborn	def.	Kyle Mattmiller	Decision (Unanimous)	3	3:00
	Chris Wilke	def.	Ben Hocraffer	KO (Punch)	1	0:51
	Ross Schaldweiler	def.	Mike Maki	TKO (Punches)	1	0:51

== KOTC: Demolition ==
KOTC: Demolition was an event held on August 6, 2011 at the Northern Lights Casino in Walker, Minnesota.

=== Results ===
Main Card
Weight class				Method	Round	Time	Notes
	Sean Strickland	def.	Brett Sbardella	KO (Punches)	1	1:03
	Mark Stoddard	def.	Tony Rook	TKO (Punches)	1	4:53
	Tyler Hellenbrand	def.	Bobby Ferrier	TKO (Punches)	1	2:39
	Chris McCalister	def.	Jason Ehresmann	Submission (Triangle Choke)	1	1:09
	Jacob Juvland	def.	Terry Carmody	Submission (Armbar)	1	1:02
	Dan Church	def.	Daniel Soukup	Submission (Rear-Naked Choke)	1	1:06
	Jose Prieto	def.	Tyler Eakes	Decision (Unanimous)	3	3:00
	John Aultman	def.	J.J. Holloway	Submission (Rear-Naked Choke)	3	1:24
	Michael Froelich	def.	Josh Thompson	Decision (Unanimous)	3	3:00
	Marc Hummel	def.	Tyler Molitor	Submission (Neck Crank)	2	2:53
	Ernesto Martinez	def.	Jonathan Fairbanks	TKO (Retirement)	1	3:00
	Vernon Kingbird	def.	David Smith	Decision (Unanimous)	3	3:00
	Erick Dybvig	def.	Korey Blazek	Decision (Unanimous)	3	3:00

== KOTC: Overdrive ==
KOTC: Overdrive was an event held on August 20, 2011 at the Riverwind Casino in Norman, Oklahoma.

=== Results ===
Main Card
Weight class				Method	Round	Time	Notes
Bantamweight	Jeremy Spoon	def.	Donald Sanchez (c)	Decision (Split)	5	5:00	(Note: For the King of the Cage Bantamweight Championship.)
	Sidiah Parker	def.	Chris Jones	KO (Punch)	1	1:05
	Brenda Gonzales	def.	Trisha Clark	TKO (Punches)	2	3:16
	James Bailey	def.	Tim Papp	KO (Punch)	1	0:52
	Chevy Bridges	def.	Larry Wood	Submission (Rear-Naked Choke)	1	3:25
	Jamie Steichen	def.	Turrell Galloway	Decision (Unanimous)	3	5:00
	Brandon Newsome	def.	Ricky Compala	Submission (Guillotine Choke)	2	1:17
	Terry Acker	def.	Anthony Kellen	Decision (Unanimous)	3	5:00

== KOTC: Kingpin ==
KOTC: Kingpin was an event held on August 27, 2011 at the Lubbock Memorial Civic Center in Lubbock, Texas.

=== Results ===
Main Card
Weight class				Method	Round	Time	Notes
Junior Welterweight	Tim Means (c)	def.	Cody Pfister	Submission (Rear-Naked Choke)	1	2:15	(Note: For The King of the Cage Junior Welterweight Championship.)
	Gabriel Garcia	def.	Guto Feliciano	Decision (Unanimous)	3	3:00
	Zach Haney	def.	Jerry Hinojosa	Submission (Armbar)	1	0:54
	Matt Espinoza	def.	Zavier Garcia	Submission (Rear-Naked Choke)	1	1:54
	Dillon Rouse	def.	Saxon Gladwell	Decision (Unanimous)	3	3:00
	Josh Hill	def.	Ben Janeke	Decision (Unanimous)	3	3:00
	Brian Joseph	def.	Anthony Sessions	TKO (Punches)	1	1:18

== KOTC: Underground 70 ==
KOTC: Underground 70 was an event held on August 27, 2011 at the Leelanau Sands Casino in Peshawbestown, Michigan.

=== Results ===
Main Card
Weight class				Method	Round	Time	Notes
	Christos Piliafas	def.	Joe Mellotte	TKO (Punches)	1	0:55
	Danny Thomas	def.	Jason Fish	Submission (Choke)	1	4:20
	Dom O'Grady	def.	John Tarrh	Submission (Armbar)	1	1:22
	John Schulz	def.	Donte Adams	Submission (Rear-Naked Choke)	1	0:32
	Ryan King	def.	Cody Van Donkelaar	TKO (Punches)	1	1:32
	Troy Lamson	def.	Billy Ward	Decision (Split)	3	3:00
	Bill Nash	def.	Jay Jackson	TKO (Punches)	1	1:50
	Donnie Turner	def.	Joe Rogers	Decision (Unanimous)	3	3:00
	Brent Winekoff	def.	Dave Morgan	Submission (Punches)	1	2:20
	Kevin Lee	def.	Tom Stalteri	Submission (Rear-Naked Choke)	1	1:20
	Jason Austin	def.	Tony Bradford	Submission (Armbar)	1	0:54
	Bill Fent	def.	Josh Stephenson	TKO (Punches)	1	2:20

== KOTC: Future Legends 3 ==
KOTC: Future Legends 3 was an event held on September 3, 2011 at the Eastside Cannery Casino in Las Vegas, Nevada.

=== Results ===
Main Card
Weight class				Method	Round	Time	Notes
	Kurt Crum	def.	Kirby Mckenzie	Submission (Rear-Naked Choke)	1	2:25
	Jacob Faamaile Malili	def.	Aaron Williams	Decision (Split)	3	3:00
	Anthony Canal	def.	Dan Cusion	Submission (Triangle Choke)	1	1:27
	Louis Cruz	def.	Daniel Marino	KO (Punch)	1	0:04
	Andrew Windrem	def.	Casey Clendenen	Submission (Rear-Naked Choke)	2	2:54
	Brandon Horton	def.	Henry Verdugo	Submission (Rear-Naked Choke)	1	0:57
	Mike Hernandez	def.	Justin Bonner	Submission (Armbar)	1	0:43
	Jose Lopez	def.	Rick Fell	Submission (Rear-Naked Choke)	2	1:49
	Michael Sanchez	def.	Bob Villanueva	TKO (Punches)	1	2:06
	Rebecca Main	def.	Melissa Edwards	Decision (Unanimous)	3	3:00
	Sean Thompson	def.	Niels Berlemann	TKO (Punches)	2	2:23
	David Mitchell	def.	Ken Ocean	TKO (Retirement)	1	3:00
	Kawika Lagasca	def.	Roman Rodriguez	Submission (Rear-Naked Choke)	2	1:36
	Michael Lavell	def.	Dario Casteel	TKO (Punches)	1	1:32

== KOTC: Rising Sun ==
KOTC: Rising Sun was an event held on September 10, 2011 at the Buffalo Thunder Resort & Casino in Santa Fe, New Mexico.

=== Results ===
Main Card
Weight class				Method	Round	Time	Notes
	Gerald Lovato	def.	Jeremiah Castillo	Submission (Guillotine Choke)	1	4:55
	Charles Bennett	def.	Michael Casteel	TKO (Slam and Punches)	1	0:56
	Trey Solomon	def.	Danny August	TKO (Punches)	1	2:53
	Marciano Wilson	def.	Santana-Sol Martinez	TKO (Punches and Elbows)	1	0:31
	Gene Perez	def.	Nathaniel Baker	TKO (Punches)	2	3:33
	Miguel Delgado	def.	Mike Escobar	Submission (Armbar)	1	2:35
	Skyler Pendleton	def.	Rudy Kennedy	Decision (Unanimous)	3	3:00
	Asuncion Constantino	def.	Brad Richardson	Decision (Split)	3	3:00
	Derek Perez	def.	Lance Credeur	Submission (Guillotine Choke)	1	1:35
	Ray Borg	def.	Juan Aranda	Submission (Rear-Naked Choke)	1	1:23
	Ray Martinez	def.	Esias Gordo	Decision (Unanimous)	3	3:00
	Marcus Farmer	def.	Kar King	Submission (Punches)	1	2:56
	Ruben Garcia	def.	Fernando Sanchez	Decision (Unanimous)	3	3:00
	Chad Padilla	def.	Adrian Yazzi	Decision (Unanimous)	3	3:00

== KOTC: First Defense ==
KOTC: First Defense was an event held on September 15, 2011 at the San Manuel Casino in Highland, California.

=== Results ===
Main Card
Weight class				Method	Round	Time	Notes
Flyweight	Jared Papazian (c)	def.	Marvin Garcia	Decision (Unanimous)	5	5:00	(Note: For the King of the Cage Flyweight Championship.)
	Brian Warren	def.	Boyko Ranchev	Decision (Unanimous)	3	5:00
	Kris Armbrister	def.	Jesus Morales	Submission (Rear-Naked Choke)	1	1:37
	Gabe Rivas	def.	Alex Rickards	TKO (Punches)	1	2:57
	Lucas Taber	def.	Jimmy Stormo	Submission (Armbar)	1	0:42
	Manny Murillo	def.	Ronald LeBreton Jr.	TKO (Punches)	1	2:59

== KOTC: Apocalypse ==
KOTC: Apocalypse was an event held on September 17, 2011 at the WinStar World Casino in Thackerville, Oklahoma.

=== Results ===
Main Card
Weight class				Method	Round	Time	Notes
Super Heavyweight	Tony Lopez	def.	Esteves Jones (c)	Submission (Rear-Naked Choke)	4	3:30	(Note: For the King of the Cage Super Heavyweight Championship.)
Welterweight	Bill Albrecht	def.	David Gomez (c)	Submission (Armbar)	2	3:55	(Note: For The King of the Cage Welterweight Championship.)
	Donald Sanchez	def.	Ira Boyd	Submission (Rear-Naked Choke)	1	2:52
	Tye Brown	def.	David Roberts	Submission	3	4:35
	Treston Thomison	def.	Anthony Kellen	Decision (Split)	3	5:00
	Thomas Schulte	def.	Marcio Navarro	TKO (Punches)	1	1:30
	Frank Baca	def.	Francisco Barragan	Decision (Unanimous)	3	5:00
	Zac Kelley	def.	Wes Linsley	Submission (Guillotine Choke)	1	1:48

== KOTC: Homecoming ==
KOTC: Homecoming was an event held on September 24, 2011 at the Soaring Eagle Casino in Mt. Pleasant, Michigan.

=== Results ===
Main Card
Weight class				Method	Round	Time	Notes
Middleweight	Brandon Hunt (c)	def.	Angelo Popofski	TKO (Punches)	1	2:10	(Note: For The King of the Cage Middleweight Championship.)
	Brad Burrick	def.	Chad Herrick	TKO (Punches)	2	0:45
	Jason Ireland	def.	Michael Musslewhite	TKO (Punches)	1	1:40
	Dom O'Grady	def.	Victor Torres	Decision (Unanimous)	3	5:00
	Christos Piliafas	def.	Will Crockett	TKO (Punches)	1	2:17
	Jason Fischer	def.	Roger Bontrager	Submission (Rear-Naked Choke)	1	1:49
	Joe Voisin	def.	Adam Alvarez	Submission (Heel Hook)	1	2:18
	Drew Morais	def.	Hector Garcia	Decision (Unanimous)	3	5:00

== KOTC: Interference ==
KOTC: Interference was an event held on October 8, 2011 at the Lake of the Torches Casino in Lac du Flambeau, Wisconsin.

=== Results ===
Main Card
Weight class				Method	Round	Time	Notes
	Daniel Stittgen	def.	Mark Stoddard	Decision (Majority)	3	5:00
	Floyd Hodges	def.	Eugene Crisler	TKO (Punches)	3	3:03
	Jon Barker	def.	Zach Kellso	Submission (Rear-Naked Choke)	1	3:43
	Rick Glenn	def.	Gustavo Rodriguez	TKO (Punches)	2	1:46
	Shane Cadotte	def.	Dale Bennett	Submission (Guillotine Choke)	1	2:44
	Brian Householder	def.	Damon Butterfield	TKO (Punches)	1	3:31
	Tony Zelinski	def.	Matt Gaffney	Submission (Rear-Naked Choke)	1	4:56
	Adrian Pearson	def.	Mitchell Justinak	Submission (Rear-Naked Choke)	1	1:59
	Adam Merrill	def.	Conner Moore	TKO (Doctor Stoppage)	1	3:00
	Doug Deback	def.	Jay Lange	Decision (Unanimous)	3	3:00
	Glen Hunter	def.	Nick Young	Submission (Rear-Naked Choke)	1	1:03

== KOTC: Underground 71 ==
KOTC: Underground 71 was an event held on October 15, 2011 at the Ute Mountain Casino in Cortez, Colorado.

=== Results ===
Main Card
Weight class				Method	Round	Time	Notes
	Isaac Martinez	def.	Dwight Parker	TKO (Punches)	1	4:38
	Angelo Sanchez	def.	Amross Teasaytwho	Submission (Armbar)	1	2:08
	Ambert Teasaytwho	def.	Anthony Ford	Submission (Guillotine Choke)	1	2:28
	Josh Ramage	def.	Johnny Petraglia	Submission (Rear-Naked Choke)	2	2:15
	Manny Ruiz	def.	Trevor Long	Submission (Armbar)	3	2:14
	Terrin Yazzie	def.	Ambrose Teasyatwho	TKO (Punches)	2	2:32
	Efren Casteneda	def.	Charles Deihl	KO (Punch)	1	2:56
	Brice Boling	def.	Sergio Garcia	Submission (Rear-Naked Choke)	1	1:53
	Dan Castenada	def.	Dominic Gurule	Decision (Unanimous)	3	3:00

== KOTC: Underground 72 ==
KOTC: Underground 72 was an event held on November 12, 2011 at the Kewadin Casino in Sault Ste. Marie, Michigan.

=== Results ===
Main Card
Weight class				Method	Round	Time	Notes
	Mitch Fryia	def.	Brian Burgan	Submission (Armbar)	1	4:00
	Billy Ward	def.	Larry Gordon-Badillo	DQ (Illegal Kick)	1	1:58
	Jason Davis	def.	Gary Conradson	Decision (Unanimous)	3	5:00
	Ryan Brettingham	def.	Cody Osborne	Submission (Rear-Naked Choke)	1	3:31
	Vyron Phillips	def.	Pat Gionette	TKO (Punches)	1	1:58
	Richard Wells	def.	Eric Sandy	Submission (Triangle Choke)	1	0:52
	John Veltri	def.	John Sayers-Thibault	TKO (Punches)	1	2:49
	Denato Richardson	def.	William Dunmore	Submission (Armbar)	1	0:18
	Nick Naccarato	def.	Jim Garlinghouse	TKO (Punches)	1	2:28
	Anthony Osborne	def.	Taylor Bumstead	TKO (Punches)	1	2:31
	Chase King	def.	Dave Bryan	Submission (Triangle Choke)	1	0:58
	Ed Celestino	def.	Aaron Keeling	Submission (Armbar)	1	1:29

== KOTC: Cage Quest ==
KOTC: Cage Quest was an event held on November 12, 2011 at the Gold Country Casino in Oroville, California.

=== Results ===
Main Card
Weight class				Method	Round	Time	Notes
	Kawika Morton	def.	Michael Gonzalez	Submission (Rear-Naked Choke)	1	2:25
	Josh Hinkle	def.	Kenneth Alexander	Decision (Unanimous)	3	5:00
	Wes Swofford	def.	Rick Randolph	Submission (Triangle Choke)	1	1:22
	Melvin Costa	def.	Miguel Cosio	TKO (Punches)	1	4:41
	Vaymond Dennis	def.	Matt Muramoto	Decision (Split)	3	5:00
	Lewis Gonzalez	def.	Justin Baesman	Submission (Punches)	1	2:00
	Josh Paiva	def.	Marcus Ocegueda	Submission (Guillotine Choke)	2	2:41
	Mike Franco	def.	Keyon Atkins	TKO (Punches)	1	2:29
	Armando Sabala	def.	Demitry Moore	TKO (Punches)	1	1:32
	Willie Boatwright	def.	Travis Whitley	Submission (Rear-Naked Choke)	1	1:35

== KOTC: High Performance ==
KOTC: High Performance was an event held on November 19, 2011 at the Buffalo Thunder Resort & Casino in Santa Fe, New Mexico.

=== Results ===
Main Card
Weight class				Method	Round	Time	Notes
	Angelo Sanchez	def.	Jacob Clark	Submission (Armbar)	2	2:08
	Tim Means	def.	Mario Ramos	TKO (Punches)	1	1:07
	Donnie Martinez	def.	Trey Solomon	TKO (Punches)	1	2:19
	Frank Baca	def.	Terry Taylor	Submission (Rear Naked Choke)	1	1:14
	Jeremy Oyenque	def.	Corey Jagger	TKO (Punches)	3	0:16
	Ray Borg	def.	Jesse Kocoseris	Submission (Rear-Naked Choke)	1	0:40
	Zuhey Quezeda Harris	def.	Cassandra Tafoya	TKO (Punches)	1	0:07
	Brad Richardson	def.	JD Tankersley	Decision (Unanimous)	3	3:00
	Eric White	def.	Terrin Yazzie	Decision (Unanimous)	3	3:00
	Caleb Choate	def.	Dan Gossett	TKO (Doctor Stoppage Cut)	2	3:00
	Ben Miranda	def.	Kyle Allen	Submission (Guillotine Choke)	2	0:49
	Richard Lopez	def.	Fernando Sanchez	TKO (Punches)	1	1:02

== KOTC: Winter Warriors ==
KOTC: Winter Warriors was an event held on December 10, 2011 at the Northern Lights Casino in Walker, Minnesota.

=== Results ===
Main Card
Weight class				Method	Round	Time	Notes
	Sam Cleveland	def.	R.T. Hicks	Submission (Punches)	1	2:43
	Kenneth Glenn	def.	Lucas Goulet	Submission (Rear-Naked Choke)	2	1:37
	Cully Butterfield	def.	Chris Skoglund	Submission (Arm-Triangle Choke)	1	2:50
	Rose Namajunas	def.	Heather Bassett	Decision (Unanimous)	3	3:00
	Eli Finn	def.	Rocky Murray	Submission (Kimura)	1	2:22
	Ben Gotchie	def.	Maynard Kinbird	Decision (Unanimous)	3	3:00
	Dallon White	def.	Dion Fairbanks	Decision (Unanimous)	3	3:00
	Nick Tollefson	def.	Josh Thompson	Submission (Guillotine Choke)	2	0:32
	Jay Feiock	def.	Vernon Kingbird	TKO (Punches)	2	0:22
	Nick Reece	def.	Brad Smith	Decision (Split)	3	3:00
	Mitchell Field	def.	Andy Kidrowski	Submission (Rear-Naked Choke)	2	0:54
	Dave Smith	def.	Paul Bouvier	Submission (Guillotine Choke)	1	0:57

== KOTC: Future Legends 4 ==
KOTC: Future Legends 4 was an event held on December 10, 2011 at the Eastside Cannery Casino in Las Vegas, Nevada.

=== Results ===
Main Card
Weight class				Method	Round	Time	Notes
	Kurt Crum	def.	Ramon Hernandez	Submission (Rear-Naked Choke)	1	1:13
	Marcus Edwards	def.	Milan Zerjal	Decision (Unanimous)	3	3:00
	Derek Imig	def.	Art Satterwhite	Submission (Triangle Choke)	1	2:19
	Kawika Lagasca	def.	David Mitchell	KO (Punch)	3	0:28
	Daniel Cuison	def.	Justin Calhoun	Decision (Unanimous)	3	3:00
	Jon Loftin	def.	Jonathan Noriega	Decision (Unanimous)	3	3:00
	Brandon Horton	def.	Quinton Triche	Submission (Guillotine Choke)	2	1:59
	Michael Lavell	def.	Robert Precie	Submission (Triangle Choke)	2	1:09
	Justin Hernandez	def.	Carlos Garcia	Decision (Split)	3	3:00
	David Hernandez	def.	Dale Jackson	TKO (Punches)	1	0:30
	Greg Joiner	def.	Kenosha Saunders	Decision (Unanimous)	3	3:00

== KOTC: Magnaflow ==
KOTC: Magnaflow was an event held on December 15, 2011 at the San Manuel Casino in Highland, California.

=== Results ===
Main Card
Weight class				Method	Round	Time	Notes
Heavyweight	Tony Lopez	def.	Esteves Jones	TKO (Punches)	4	4:04	(Note: For the King of the Cage Heavyweight Championship.)
	Brian Warren	def.	John De La O	TKO (Punches)	1	1:47
	David Gomez	def.	Tom Gallicchio	Decision (Unanimous)	3	5:00
	Marvin Garcia	def.	Zach Haney	Decision (Split)	3	5:00
	Chris Culley	def.	Vince Ortiz	Decision (Unanimous)	3	3:00
	Johnny Cisneros	def.	James Cooper	TKO (Punches)	1	0:40
	Jason Walraven	def.	Lucas Taber	Decision (Unanimous)	3	3:00

== KOTC: Steel Curtain ==
KOTC: Steel Curtain was an event held on December 17, 2011 at the Riverwind Casino in Norman, Oklahoma.

=== Results ===
Main Card
Weight class				Method	Round	Time	Notes
	Sean Strickland	def.	Brandon Hunt	TKO (Punches)	1	8
	J.C. Cottrell	def.	Thomas Schulte	Decision (Unanimous)	3	5:00
	Codale Ford	def.	Brian Grinnell	TKO (Doctor Stoppage Eye Injury)	1	5:00
	Carl Perry	def.	Tim Papp	TKO (Punches)	1	1:26
	Garrick Landis	def.	Rickey Bowen	Decision (Unanimous)	3	5:00
	Scott Bear	def.	Michael Casteel	Submission (Rear-Naked Choke)	1	1:52
	Rico Cato	def.	Marciano Wilson	Submission (Rear-Naked Choke)	1	1:28
	Noe Zamora	def.	Rowdy Wilbourn	Submission (Guillotine Choke)	1	0:51
	Isaiah Reyes	def.	Anthony Kellen	Submission (Punches)	3	2:21

== See also ==
- King of the Cage
- List of King of the Cage events
- List of King of the Cage champions
