= Treston =

Treston is a given name. Notable people with the name include:

- Treston Decoud (born 1993), American football player
- Treston Thomison, American mixed martial artist
