= Seneca Casino =

Seneca Casino may refer to:

- Seneca Allegany Casino, in Salamanca, New York
- Seneca Niagara Casino & Hotel, in Niagara Falls, New York
