= Fully Dressed Tour =

Comedy tour by Jim Gaffigan

- Tour by Jim Gaffigan
- Start date: July 7, 2016
- End date: 201

Jim Gaffigan concert chronology
- Contagious Tour (2015); Fully Dressed Tour (2016-17); Noble Ape Tour (2017-18)

The Fully Dressed Tour is a 2016-17 comedy tour by comedian Jim Gaffigan.

== Opening Act ==
- Ted Alexandro

== Filming and recording ==
Columbus Ohio September 2016

== Setlist ==
1. "Weird If You Didn't Clap"
2. "Belt"
3. "Seasons"

== Tour dates ==
Date	City	Country	Venue
North America
July 7, 2016	Dallas	United States	Gexa Energy Pavilion
July 8, 2016	Norman	United States	Riverwind Casino
July 9, 2016	Houston	United States	Cynthia Woods Mitchell Pavilion
July 10, 2016	San Antonio	United States	Majestic Theatre
July 13, 2016	Albany	United States	Times Union Center
July 14, 2016	Portland	United States	Cross Insurance Arena
July 15, 2016 (2 Shows)	Mashantucket	United States	Foxwoods Resort Casino
July 16, 2016	Bethel	United States	Bethel Woods Center for the Arts
July 17, 2016	Reading	United States	Santander Arena
July 18, 2016	Rochester	United States	Blue Cross Arena
