= Chinook Winds Casino =

Casino in Lincoln City, Oregon, United States

Chinook Winds Casino Resort

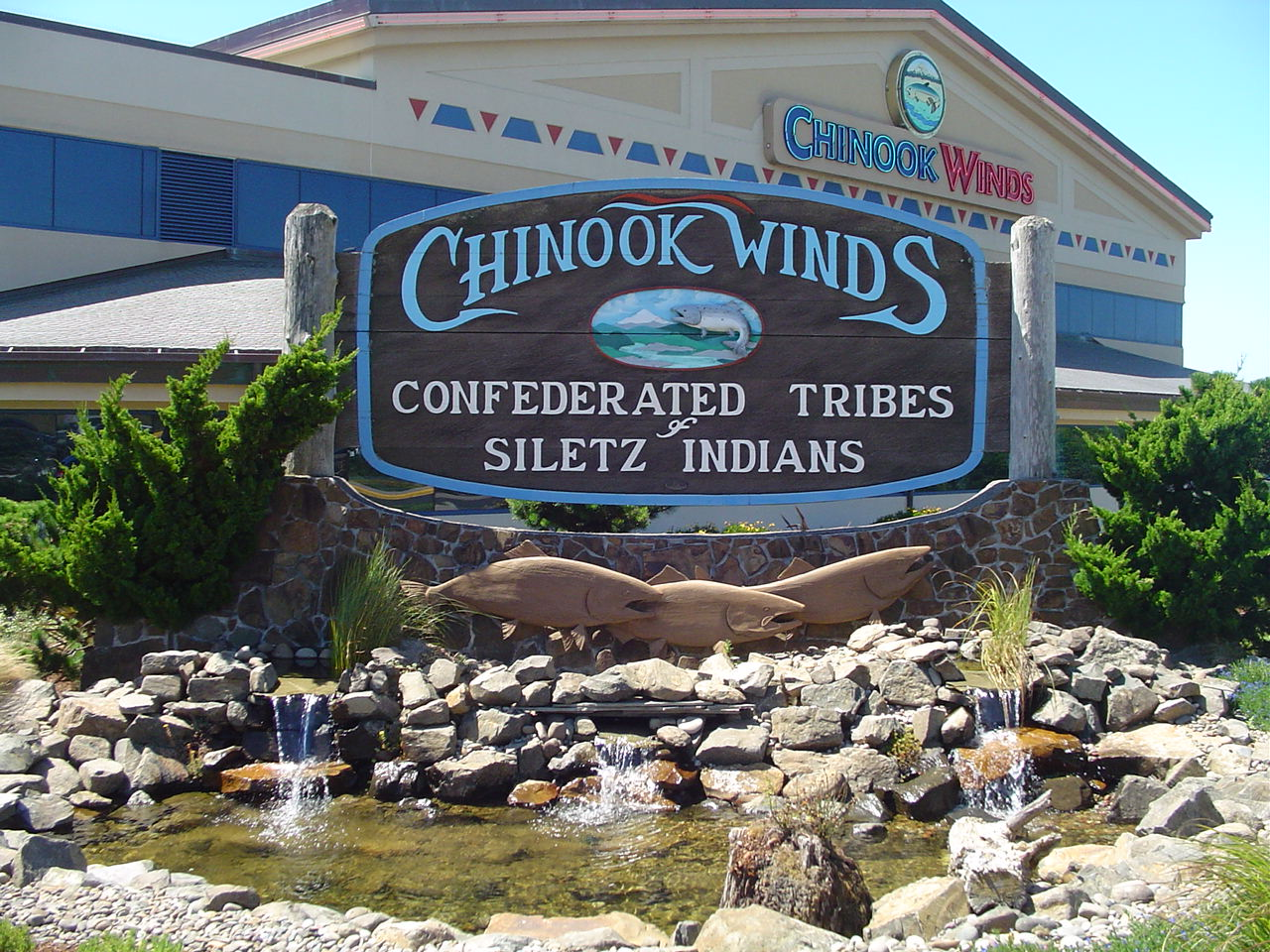
- Interactive map of Chinook Winds Casino Resort
- Location: 1777 NW 44th Street Lincoln City, Oregon 97367; 44.998°N 124.009°W
- Opened: 1995
- No. of rooms: 227 (81 suites)
- Gaming space: 157,000 sq ft (14,600 m^{2})
- Notable restaurants: Siletz Bay Buffet; Euchre Deli; Aces Bar and Grill; Chinook Seafood Grill and Lounge; Rogue River Steakhouse; Rogue River Lounge
- Casino type: Land-based
- Owner: Confederated Tribes of Siletz
- Website: www.chinookwindscasino.com

Chinook Winds Casino and convention center is a Native American casino located in Lincoln City, Oregon. It is operated by the Confederated Tribes of Siletz. The casino's amenities include a 227-room hotel, a 157,000-square-foot (14,600 m^{2}) gaming floor (between two floors), two restaurants (with a 24-hour food counter), a 35,000-square-foot (3,300 m^{2}) convention center, arcade, day-care services, live entertainment, a golf course and other special events.

The casino typically operates 24 hours a day, 365 days a year. It opened to the public at limited capacity on January 15, 2021, after closing for the COVID-19 pandemic.

== See also ==
- Gambling in Oregon
- List of casinos in Oregon
