= Treston Thomison =

American mixed martial arts fighter

- Born: Sulphur, Oklahoma, United States
- Nationality: American
- Height: 5 ft 8 in (173 cm)
- Weight: 145.9 lb (66 kg; 10 st 6 lb)
- Division: Lightweight; Featherweight
- Reach: 67 in (170 cm)
- Stance: Orthodox
- Fighting out of: Sulphur, Oklahoma, United States
- Years active: 2009-present

Mixed martial arts record
- Total: 16
- Wins: 10
- By knockout: 1
- By submission: 8
- By decision: 1
- Losses: 6
- By knockout: 3
- By submission: 1
- By decision: 2

Other information
- Mixed martial arts record from Sherdog

Treston Thomison is an American mixed martial artist who competes in the Featherweight division of Bellator MMA. A professional competitor since 2009, he has also competed for King of the Cage.

== Mixed martial arts record ==
Professional record breakdown
16 matches	10 wins	6 losses
By knockout	1	3
By submission	8	1
By decision	1	2

Res.	Record	Opponent	Method	Event	Date	Round	Time	Location	Notes
Loss	10–6	Justin Lawrence	TKO (doctor stoppage)	Bellator 181	July 14, 2017	1	3:34	Thackerville, Oklahoma, United States	Return to Featherweight.
Loss	10–5	Emmanuel Rivera	Decision (unanimous)	Bellator 174	March 3, 2017	3	5:00	Thackerville, Oklahoma, United States	Catchweight (151 lbs) bout.
Win	10–4	Dawond Pickney	Submission (armbar)	Bellator 166	December 2, 2016	1	0:51	Thackerville, Oklahoma, United States	Lightweight debut.
Win	9–4	Aaron Roberson	Submission (guillotine choke)	Bellator 151	March 4, 2016	2	2:20	Thackerville, Oklahoma, United States	
Loss	8–4	Chris Jones	Decision (unanimous)	Bellator 146	November 20, 2015	3	5:00	Thackerville, Oklahoma, United States	Catchweight (150 lbs) bout.
Loss	8-3	Cody Walker	KO (head kick)	Bellator 128	October 10, 2014	2	4:59	Thackerville, Oklahoma, United States	
Win	8-2	Stephen Banaszak	Submission (guillotine choke)	Bellator 121	June 6, 2014	1	N/A	Thackerville, Oklahoma, United States	
Loss	7-2	Stephen Banaszak	Submission (armbar)	Bellator CXIX	March 7, 2014	1	4:56	Rama, Ontario, Canada	
Win	7-1	Jade Porter	Submission (armbar)	KOTC: Regulators	January 19, 2013	1	0:18	Scottsdale, Arizona, United States	
Win	6-1	Daniel Armendariz	KO (punch)	KOTC: Aerial Assault	June 30, 2012	1	0:31	Thackerville, Oklahoma, United States	
Win	5-1	Brian Joseph	Submission (armbar)	KOTC: Bad Intentions II	April 14, 2012	1	1:51	Thackerville, Oklahoma, United States	
Loss	4-1	Mike Maldonado	KO (punches)	KOTC: Total Destruction	January 21, 2012	1	0:31	Thackerville, Oklahoma, United States	
Win	4-0	Anthony Kellen	Decision (split)	KOTC: Apocalypse	September 17, 2011	3	5:00	Thackerville, Oklahoma, United States	
Win	3-0	Scott Bear	Submission (rear-naked choke)	KOTC: Epic Force	June 24, 2011	1	1:18	Thackerville, Oklahoma, United States	
Win	2-0	Cris Leyva	Submission (armbar)	KOTC: Underground 67	April 2, 2011	1	2:13	Cortez, Colorado, United States	
Win	1-0	Kyle Waag	Submission	FCF: Freestyle Cage Fighting 43	July 24, 2010	1	0:29	Claremore, Oklahoma, United States	

=== Mixed martial arts amateur record ===
Amateur record breakdown		
4 matches	4 wins	0 losses
By submission	4	0

Res.	Record	Opponent	Method	Event	Date	Round	Time	Location	Notes
Win	4-0	Charles Anderson	Submission (rear-naked choke)	FCF: Freestyle Cage Fighting 39	January 30, 2010	1	0:20	Shawnee, Oklahoma, United States	
Win	3-0	Robert Pickle	Submission	FCF: Freestyle Cage Fighting 33	June 27, 2009	3	0:27	Durant, Oklahoma, United States	
Win	2-0	Steven Tackett	Submission (armbar)	FCF: Freestyle Cage Fighting 31	May 2, 2009	1	1:01	Tulsa, Oklahoma, United States	
Win	1-0	Charles Evans	Submission (rear-naked choke)	FCF: Freestyle Cage Fighting 30	April 4, 2009	1	0:20	Shawnee, Oklahoma, United States	

== See also ==
- List of male mixed martial artists
