= Northern Lights Casino =

Casino in Prince Albert, Saskatchewan, Canada

- Interactive map of Northern Lights Casino
- Location: Prince Albert, Saskatchewan, Canada; 44 Marquis Road Prince Albert, Saskatchewan S6V 7Y5; 53.17998°N 105.75638°W
- Opened: 1996
- Gaming space: 42,000 square foot 590 slots & 11 tables
- Permanent shows: Starlight Lounge
- Notable restaurants: NorthStar Restaurant
- Casino type: Land
- Owner: Saskatchewan Indian Gaming Authority
- Renovated in: 2011
- Website: www.northernlightscasino.ca

Northern Lights Casino, is a casino located in Prince Albert, Saskatchewan, Canada. The 42,000 sq ft (3,900 m^{2}) facility includes a Casino (with 590 slot machines, 11 table games), lounge, and restaurant opened in 1996.

The Casino opened a new 4,500-square-foot (420 m^{2}) expansion in January, 2011 that included a smoking room, and 203 slot machines.

== See also ==
- List of casinos in Canada
