= Seneca Allegany Casino =

Casino in Salamanca, New York

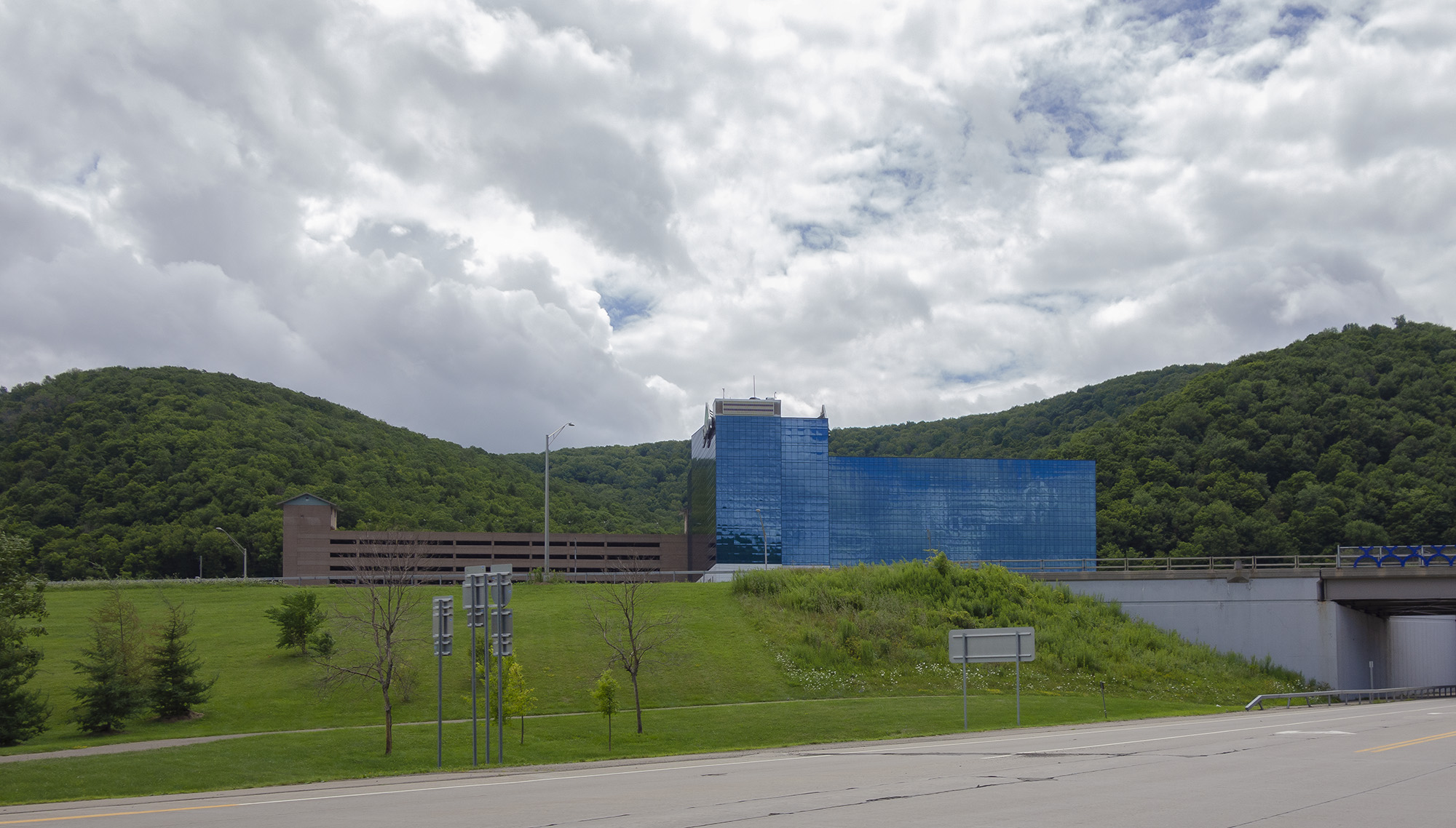
- Interactive map of Seneca Allegany Casino
- Location: Salamanca, New York; 777 Seneca Allegany Blvd; 42.15231°N 78.74922°W
- No. of rooms: 413
- Gaming space: 68,300 sq ft (6,350 m^{2})
- Signature attractions: Seneca Allegany Events Center
- Casino type: Land-based
- Owner: Seneca Nation of Indians
- Renovated in: Hotel, 2012
- Website: Seneca Allegany

Seneca Allegany Casino is a resort, hotel, and casino in Salamanca, New York. It is owned by the Seneca Nation of Indians, through its holding company Seneca Gaming Corporation. The complex consists of 68,300 sq ft (6,350 m^{2}) of gaming space, a spa, six restaurants, and has 413 hotel rooms. The Seneca Allegany Events Center, a multi-purpose facility that can host up to 2,400 guests, is also located on the property. In 2015, the Seneca Allegany Casino was awarded AAA Four Diamond Award status for the seventh consecutive year.

Within the resort is an events center that serves as a regular concert venue, with several touring performances each year. The casino grounds are also the site of an annual stop on the AMSOIL Championship Snocross Series, which has been held at the casino each year since 2013.

== Resort amenities ==
The Seneca Allegany Casino has many things to do including: 5 restaurants: The Western Door Steakhouse, Patria, Thunder Mountain Buffet, The Seneca Cafe, and The Bear Claw Cafe. 2 Shopping venues: The Logo Shop and B.Iconic. 2 Nightlife venues : The Fire Lounge and The River Bar. There is also The Spa (like its sister version in the Seneca Niagara Casino & Hotel).
