= Riverwind Casino =

Casino in Norman, Oklahoma

Coordinates: 35°10′52″N 97°30′01″W

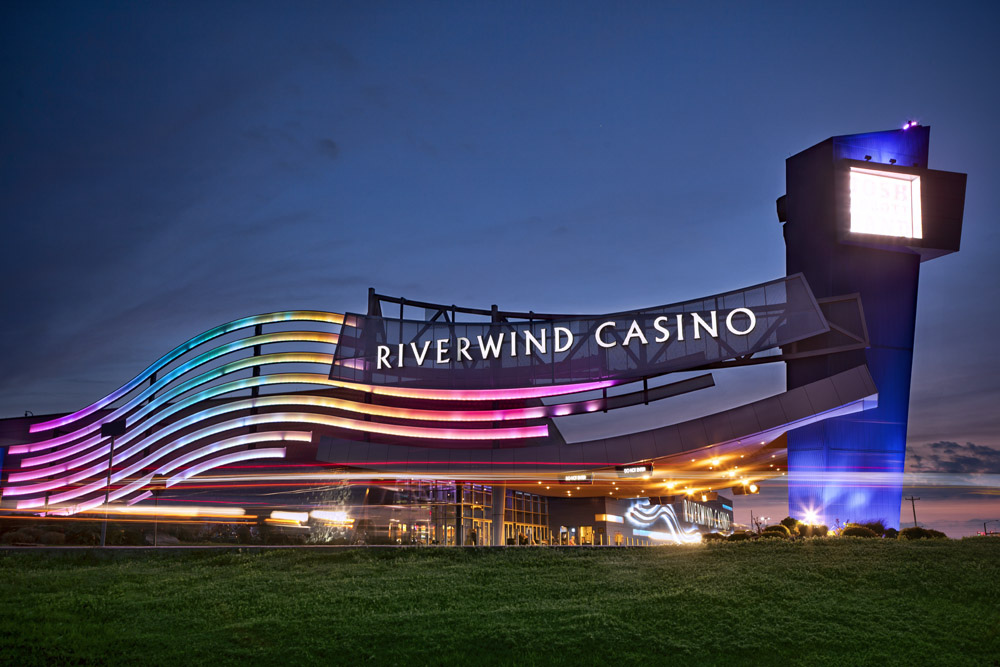
- Interactive map of Riverwind Casino
- Location: Norman, Oklahoma; 1544 West Hwy 9 Norman, Oklahoma 73071
- Opened: Summer 2006 (casino); February 2009 (hotel)
- No. of rooms: 100 (9 suites)
- Gaming space: 216,000 sq ft (20,100 m^{2})
- Signature attractions: Showplace Theater
- Notable restaurants: Chips N Ales; Burger King Panda Express; Rick's Pizza; Season Food Court; Taco Bueno; Willows
- Casino type: Land-based
- Owner: Chickasaw Nation of Oklahoma
- Website: http://www.riverwind.com/

Riverwind Casino is a casino located in Norman, Oklahoma that opened in 2006. The 219,000 square feet (20,300 m^{2}) casino, owned and operated by the Chickasaw Nation, is one of the largest in the state. In addition to the casino floor, the facility also has two restaurants, a lounge, a food court, several bars, valet parking and a 1500-seat theatre that hosts concerts. Riverwind also opened a 100-room adjoining hotel in February 2009. The casino is located in at the Interstate 35/State Highway 9 west junction.

== Games ==
Riverwind casino houses over 2,800 slot machines and 20 gaming tables such as blackjack, Mississippi stud, Baccarat, Three Card Poker, Card-Based Roulette and Ultimate Texas Hold'em and 17 poker tables. It also has an off-track betting area.

== Music and entertainment ==
Riverwind features musical and entertainment acts on many occasions during the year. In addition to the 1500-seat Showplace Theatre, the smaller 77-seat River Lounge, located near the northeast entrance, also features regular live musical performances as well as a full-service bar.

== Dining ==
Along with several bars and a food court, Riverwind Casino has two restaurants. Current options include, Chips & Ale's, River Buffet, Panda Express, Burger King, IHOP, and Cantina and Tacos.)

== Riverwind Hotel ==
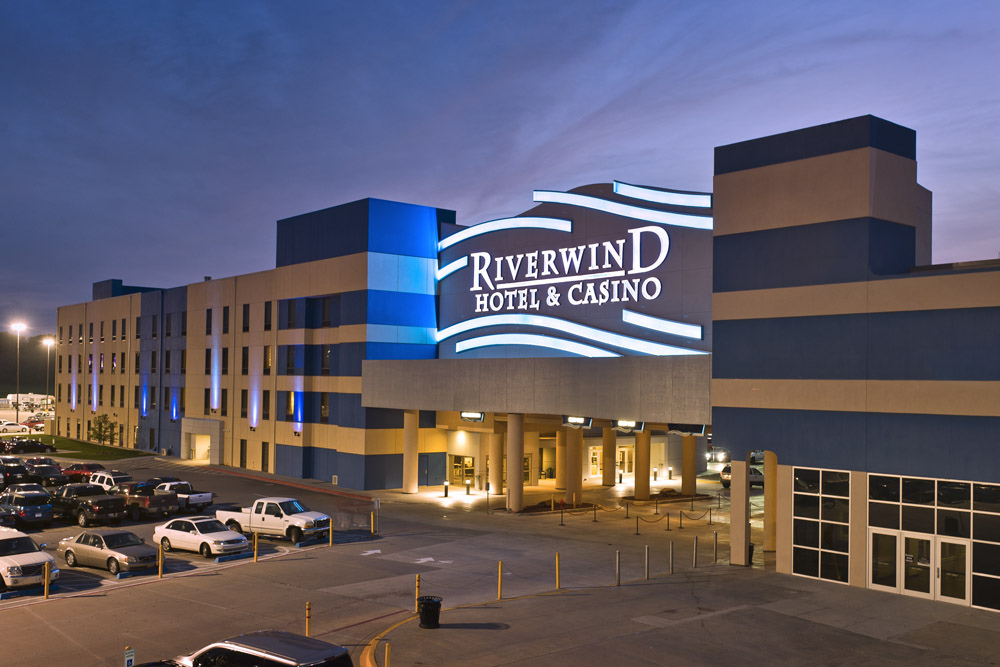
Riverwind Hotel and Casino

Opened in February 2009, the 100-room Riverwind Hotel is adjoined to the casino by a skybridge.

Riverwind Casino was designed by The Hnedak Bobo Group of Las Vegas and Memphis. The Chickasaw Nation Division of Commerce has also developed non-gaming projects. Chickasaw Nation Division of Commerce built a $1.7 million sewage treatment plant for Goldsby and a $2.1 million water tower for Newcastle.
