= 1999 in King of the Cage =

Mixed martial arts events

Information
- First date: October 30, 1999
- Last date: October 30, 1999

Events
- Total events: 1

Fights
- Total fights: 16

Chronology
1999 in King of the Cage	2000 in KotC

The year 1999 is the first year in the history of King of the Cage, a mixed martial arts promotion based in The United States. In 1999 King of the Cage held 1 event, KOTC 1: Bas Rutten's King of the Cage.

== Events list ==
#	Event title	Date	Arena	Location
1	Bas Rutten's King of the Cage	October 30, 1999	Soboba Casino	San Jacinto, California

== KOTC 1: Bas Rutten's King of the Cage ==
KOTC 1: Bas Rutten's King of the Cage was an event held on October 30, 1999, at The Soboba Casino in San Jacinto, California, United States.

=== Results ===
Main Card
Weight class				Method	Round	Time	Notes
	William Sriyapai	def.	Kit Cope	Submission (Rear Naked Choke)	1	3:18
	Chris Brennan	def.	Joe Stevenson	Submission (Triangle Choke)	1	2:04
	Deshon Dungey	def.	David Arliero Colon	Submission (Strikes)	1	1:06
	Steve Treadwell	def.	Mike Bourke	KO	1	0:11
	Brian Foster	def.	Frank Rodriguez	Submission (Strikes)	1	4:48
	Betiss Mansouri	def.	Jason Meaders	Decision (Unanimous)	3	5:00
	Erik Meaders	def.	Jeremy Williams	Decision	2	5:00
	John Leon	def.	Jesse Contaeras	TKO (Cut)	1	4:17
	Jim Abrille	vs.	Steve Scarpias	Draw	2	5:00
	John Jensen	def.	Renato Bruzzi	Decision (Unanimous)	2	5:00
	Robert Riffner	def.	Matt Montecito	Submission (Hammerlock)	1	4:26
	Tyson Johnson	def.	Benny Leo	Submission (Strikes)	1	1:13
	Al Garza	def.	Rudy Martinez	Submission (Armbar)	1	3:18
	David Step	def.	Lee Merrill	Submission (Rear Naked Choke)	1	1:18
	Eddie Estrella	vs.	Jared Wilsford	Draw	2	5:00
	Armando Sanchez	def.	Valentijne Lasoya	Decision (Unanimous)	2	5:00

== See also ==
- King of the Cage
- List of King of the Cage events
- List of King of the Cage champions
