= Alberto Crane =

American mixed martial arts fighter

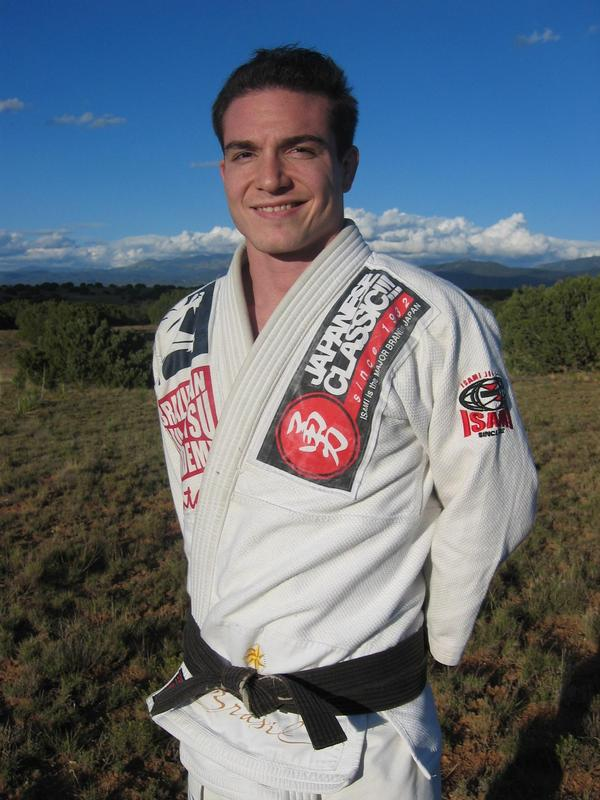
- Born: July 14, 1976 (age 50); Santa Fe, New Mexico, United States
- Nationality: American
- Height: 5 ft 9 in (1.75 m)
- Weight: 155 lb (70 kg; 11.1 st)
- Division: Lightweight
- Fighting out of: Glendale, California
- Team: Legacy Brazilian Jiu-Jitsu
- Rank: 6th degree black belt in Brazilian Jiu-Jitsu

Mixed martial arts record
- Total: 20
- Wins: 15
- By submission: 14
- By decision: 1
- Losses: 5
- By knockout: 3
- By decision: 2

Other information
- Mixed martial arts record from Sherdog

Alberto Crane
Medal record

Representing United States

Grappling

World Championship
Bronze medal – third place	2002 Rio de Janeiro, Brazil	-76kg

Alberto Lewis Crane (born July 14, 1976) is an American former mixed martial artist, submission grappler and Brazilian Jiu-Jitsu instructor. He has fought in the Ultimate Fighting Championship and is a former King of the Cage and Ring of Fire lightweight champion. He is the founder of Legacy Jiu-jitsu Academy.

== Biography ==
Crane moved to Brazil shortly after high school to train at the Gracie Barra academy in Rio de Janeiro, and then Belo Horizonte full-time. He holds a black belt in Brazilian Jiu-Jitsu under Vinicius Magalhaes (Draculino) and Carlos Gracie Jr. Upon returning to New Mexico, Crane began teaching Brazilian Jiu-Jitsu and opened two academies, one in Santa Fe and one in Albuquerque. Crane is credited as the first American Brazilian Jiu-jitsu black belt of Gracie Barra.

== Mixed martial arts ==
He started MMA in 2002 in a King of the cage event in New Mexico. After a 2-year break, Crane signed with the UFC in 2007 and lost his UFC debut against Roger Huerta at UFC 74 via TKO in round three. In his second UFC fight against Kurt Pellegrino, Crane did not take advantage of a high kick early enough in the first round. Crane was defeated via TKO in the second round.

== Brazilian Jiu-Jitsu Academy ==
Crane was owner of the Brazilian Jiu-Jitsu Academy through 2007, selling the Academy when he moved to the L.A. Basin.

== Legacy Jiu-Jitsu ==
Alberto Crane founded Legacy Jiu-Jitsu in Santa Fe, New Mexico, in January 2000. The Academy focuses on Brazilian Jiu-Jitsu, Mixed Martial Arts and Muay Thai. Legacy now has locations in Burbank, Glendale and Pasadena.

== Instructor lineage ==
Mitsuyo Maeda → Carlos Gracie, Sr. → Helio Gracie → Carlos Gracie Jr. → Vinicius Magalhães → Alberto Crane

== Personal life ==
Alberto and his wife have three children, son Sevan and twin daughters Sona and Serineh.

== Championships and accomplishments ==
- Mixed Martial Arts
  - King Of The Cage Lightweight Champion
  - Ring Of Fire Lightweight Champion
- Brazilian Jiu-Jitsu
  - 1998 IBJJF Pan Am Championship Bronze Medalist
  - 1998 IBJJF World Championships Bronze Medalist
  - 1999 Brazilian Team Title Championship - 1st Place
  - 1999 IBJJF World Championship Silver Medalist
  - 1999 Brazilian Nationals Bronze Medalist in (Purple Belt Middle Weight)
  - 1999 Brazilian Nationals Bronze Medalist in (Purple Belt Open Weight)
  - 2000 IBJJF Pan Am Championship Silver Medalist
  - 2001 Brazilian National Championship—3rd place (Brown Belt lightweight)
  - 2002 IBJJF Pan Am Championship Bronze Medalist (Black Belt)
  - 2002 Brazilian Team Title Championship—1st place (part of brown/black belt lightweight team)
  - 2002 IBJJF World Championship Bronze Medalist( Black Belt, Closed Bracket with Teammates)
  - 2012 1st Place - Las Vegas International Open IBJJF Master Division
  - 2012 1st Place - American Nationals IBJJF Championship Master Division
  - 2012 1st Place - Long Beach International Open IBJJF Master Division
  - 2013 1st Place - Abu Dhabi Pro US Nationals Master Division
  - 2013 1st Place - San Francisco International Open Master Division
  - 2013 1st Place - Las Vegas Spring International Open IBJJF Master Division
  - 2013 1st Place - LA Open NABJJF Master Division
  - 2013 1st Place - Munich International Open IBJJF Master Division
  - 2014 1st Place - Five Grappling California 1 - Black Belt Master Division
  - 2014 1st Place - Five Grappling Nevada 1 - No Gi Expert Division
  - 2014 1st Place - European No-Gi IBJJF Championship Master Division
  - 2014 1st Place - Grapplers Quest UFC Expo - No Gi Master Expert Division
  - 2014 1st Place - Grapplers Quest UFC Expo - Black Belt Master Division
  - 2015 1st Place - Abu Dhabi Pro US Nationals Master Open Weight Division
  - 2015 1st Place - IBJJF World No-Gi Championship Master Division

== Mixed martial arts record ==
Professional record breakdown
20 matches	15 wins	5 losses
By knockout	0	3
By submission	14	0
By decision	1	2

Res.	Record	Opponent	Method	Event	Date	Round	Time	Location	Notes
Win	15–5	Aranik Montero	Submission (heel hook)	Fighting Marcou Arena 2	July 17, 2011	1	N/A	Palavas-les-Flots, Herault, France	
Win	14–5	Gabe Rivas	Submission (armbar)	KOTC: Turning Point	March 27, 2011	1	2:23	Tarzana, California, United States	
Win	13–5	Ludwing Salazar	Submission (Achilles lock)	XVT 5: Franca vs. Kheder	December 19, 2010	1	2:27	Cartago, Costa Rica	
Loss	12–5	Albert Rios	Decision (unanimous)	Called Out MMA II	January 24, 2010	3	5:00	Ontario, California, United States	
Loss	12–4	Tony Hervey	KO (punches)	KOTC: Militia	June 11, 2009	1	0:12	Highland, California, United States	
Win	12–3	Eric Regan	Submission (triangle choke)	RITC 123- Rage in the Cage 123	February 27, 2009	1	2:20	Chandler, Arizona, United States	
Win	11–3	Brad Nordquist	Submission (rear-naked choke)	KOTC: Goodfellas	December 6, 2008	1	1:19	Albuquerque, New Mexico, United States	
Win	10–3	Richard Villa	Submission (rear-naked choke)	EDP: Breaking Point	October 18, 2008	1	N/A	Rio Rancho, New Mexico, United States	
Win	9–3	Adrian Valdez	Submission (guillotine choke)	Rage in the Cage 113	August 2, 2008	1	1:35	Albuquerque, New Mexico, United States	
Loss	8–3	Simon Marini	Decision (unanimous)	Ultimate Cage Wars 12	June 27, 2008	3	5:00	Winnipeg, Manitoba, Canada	
Loss	8–2	Kurt Pellegrino	TKO (punches)	UFC Fight Night 12	January 23, 2008	2	1:52	Las Vegas, Nevada, United States	
Loss	8–1	Roger Huerta	TKO (punches)	UFC 74	August 25, 2007	3	1:50	Las Vegas, Nevada, United States	
Win	8–0	Jeremy Crowe	Submission (crucifix)	PNRF: Inferno	January 22, 2005	1	1:03	Santa Fe, New Mexico, United States	
Win	7–0	Richie Reyes	Submission (omoplata)	PNRF: Explosion	July 16, 2004	1	0:28	Santa Fe, New Mexico, United States	
Win	6–0	John Mahlow	Submission (choke)	KOTC 36: Albuquerque	May 15, 2004	2	2:41	Albuquerque, New Mexico, United States	
Win	5–0	Takuhito Hida	Submission (armbar)	ZST: Grand Prix – Final Round	January 11, 2004	1	1:26	Tokyo, Japan	
Win	4–0	Christian Carvalho	Submission (rear-naked choke)	ROF 10: Intensity	October 18, 2003	1	5:56	Castle Rock, Colorado, United States	
Win	3–0	Javier Vazquez	Decision (split)	KOTC 21: Invasion	March 21, 2003	3	5:00	Albuquerque, New Mexico, United States	Won the KOTC Lightweight Championship. Later vacated title.
Win	2–0	Joe Vigil	Submission (triangle choke)	KOTC 20 - Crossroads	December 15, 2002	1	3:17	Bernalillo, New Mexico, United States	
Win	1–0	Nick Shadwick	Submission (rear-naked choke)	KOTC 14 - 5150	June 19, 2002	1	1:39	Bernalillo, New Mexico, United States	

== See also ==
- List of male mixed martial artists
