= Joe Stevenson =

American mixed martial arts fighter

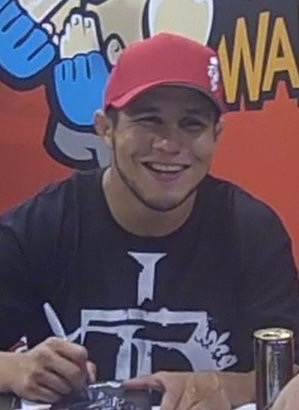
- Born: Joseph Christopher Stevenson; June 15, 1982 (age 44); Torrance, California, United States
- Other names: Daddy
- Height: 5 ft 7 in (1.70 m)
- Weight: 155 lb (70 kg; 11.1 st)
- Division: Featherweight (145lb) (2011–2012); Lightweight (155lb) (2006–2011, 2012–present); Welterweight (170lb)
- Reach: 71 in (180 cm)
- Team: Jackson's Submission Fighting
- Rank: 2nd Degree Black Belt in Brazilian Jiu-Jitsu under Robert Drysdale; 2nd Degree Black Belt in Judo under Ron Tripp
- Years active: 1999–2017

Mixed martial arts record
- Total: 49
- Wins: 33
- By knockout: 7
- By submission: 15
- By decision: 11
- Losses: 16
- By knockout: 2
- By submission: 5
- By decision: 9

Other information
- University: Victor Valley College
- Spouse: Maia Stevenson
- Notable school: Silverado High
- Mixed martial arts record from Sherdog

Joseph Christopher Stevenson (born June 15, 1982) is a retired American mixed martial artist. Coached by (UFC Hall of Famer) Matt Hughes, he rose to prominence by becoming The Ultimate Fighter 2 Welterweight Tournament Winner. Following a drop in weight class and two-year undefeated streak, he was ranked among the top UFC Lightweight competitors, culminating into a title shot for the vacant UFC Lightweight Championship against B.J. Penn at UFC 80: Rapid Fire (after the title was stripped from Sean Sherk). Stevenson fought most of his career as a Lightweight and made his Featherweight debut at UFC Live: Kongo vs. Barry. He is the former King of the Cage Lightweight Champion.

== Background ==
Stevenson began Wrestling at the age of 11. then he started both Judo, and Jiu-Jitsu, at the age of 13. He moved to Las Vegas in 2004, and began training at Marc Laimon's Cobra Kai in Las Vegas. In March 2008, Stevenson opened his own school in his hometown of Victorville, California. "Joe Stevenson's Cobra Kai" teaches MMA as well as Boxing, Kickboxing, Wrestling, and Jiu-Jitsu. On November 8, 2008, Stevenson earned his Jiu-Jitsu black belt under Robert Drysdale. After his loss to Diego Sanchez, Stevenson got a call from Rashad Evans for an invite to check out his camp at Jackson's Submission Fighting. After being reluctant at first, he finally joined Greg Jackson's camp in April 2009.

== Mixed martial arts career ==
=== The Ultimate Fighter ===
Stevenson was one of the more experienced fighters participating in The Ultimate Fighter 2. He had a professional record of 23-6-0 and held the 155 lb (70 kg). championship at King of the Cage and the 170 lb (77 kg). at Gladiator Challenge going into the show.

On November 5, 2005, Stevenson defeated Luke Cummo by unanimous decision, winning The Ultimate Fighter 2 welterweight tournament and earning a six-figure contract with the UFC. UFC president Dana White compared the bout to Forrest Griffin vs. Stephan Bonnar's fight, stating, "that was Stephan Bonnar and Forrest Griffin, only on the ground".

=== UFC start ===
On April 6, 2006, in his first fight after winning The Ultimate Fighter 2, he was upset by Josh Neer at Ultimate Fight Night 4, losing the fight by unanimous decision. Following the loss, Stevenson announced that he would drop down to the Lightweight division for future bouts.

On July 8, 2006, at UFC 61, Stevenson won his 155-pound debut against Yves Edwards. After opening up a deep cut on Edwards from the top position, the doctors were forced to pull Edwards from the match. This fight earned him a Fight of the Night award.

Stevenson returned to the Octagon at UFC 65 on November 18, 2006, defeating Japanese fighter Dokonjonosuke Mishima by guillotine choke in the first round. This fight earned him a Submission of the Night award.

Next, Stevenson was booked for the main event at UFC Fight Night 9 on April 5, 2007 against fellow Season 2 contestant Melvin Guillard. Despite a war of words between the two fighters, particularly by Guillard leading up to the bout, Stevenson made quick work of his opponent, knocking down Guillard with a punch before securing a fight-ending guillotine choke. This fight earned him another Submission of the Night award.

At UFC 74, Stevenson defeated Kurt Pellegrino by unanimous decision. After the fight doctors determined that during the course of the fight Stevenson's nose had been fractured. With his string of victories at 155, Stevenson established himself as one of the top contenders in the UFC's very competitive Lightweight division.

=== UFC Lightweight Championship ===
Stevenson was set to fight B.J. Penn for the UFC Interim Lightweight Championship at UFC 80 due to ongoing litigation regarding Sean Sherk's steroid use. On December 4, 2007, the California State Athletic Commission upheld a reduced suspension for Sherk, prompting the UFC to strip him of the lightweight championship. UFC President Dana White then confirmed that Stevenson and Penn's match would be to fill the vacant lightweight championship, but the winner of that fight would face Sherk at the next opportunity.

Just seconds after the start of the fight, Penn knocked Stevenson down with a right uppercut. From the top position, Penn landed a strong elbow to the head of Stevenson—causing a serious cut on Stevenson's hairline. In the second round, Stevenson fought more aggressively but was still unable to threaten Penn. After taking Stevenson's back, Penn secured a fight-ending rear naked choke at 4:02 of the second round.

=== UFC after loss to Penn ===
At UFC 86, Stevenson returned to the Octagon and defeated Gleison Tibau by guillotine choke submission after pulling guard. Tibau tapped quickly at 2:57 in the second round.

At UFC 91 on November 15, 2008, Stevenson was set to face top-contender Kenny Florian in a highly anticipated bout. Despite stating that he was offended to be considered an underdog against Florian, Stevenson was outclassed in the bout. After being taken down three minutes into the fight, Stevenson was mounted and eventually gave up his back to Florian. Florian forced Stevenson, who had just attained his Brazilian Jiu-Jitsu black belt, to submit to a rear naked choke just 4:03 into the first round.

Stevenson returned at UFC 95 on February 21, 2009 in the main event against debuting lightweight Diego Sanchez, and lost via unanimous decision. This fight earned him a $40,000 Fight of the Night award.

Stevenson defeated The Ultimate Fighter 5 winner Nate Diaz by unanimous decision at The Ultimate Fighter 9 Finale on June 20, 2009. Stevenson showed superior wrestling and controlled the majority of the fight. This fight earned him a $25,000 Fight of the Night award.

In his next bout, Stevenson defeated Spencer Fisher by submission due to strikes at UFC 104. Stevenson secured the crucifix position and landed elbows, forcing Fisher to submit.

Stevenson went on to face top 10 contender George Sotiropoulos on February 21, 2010, at UFC 110 in Sydney, Australia. Stevenson lost a very one sided fight by unanimous decision, but was awarded a $50,000 Fight of the Night bonus award.

Stevenson was expected to face former Pride Lightweight Champion Takanori Gomi on August 1, 2010, at UFC Live on Versus: 2. However, Stevenson pulled out of the bout with an injury and was replaced by Tyson Griffin.

Stevenson faced fellow TUF winner Mac Danzig on December 11, 2010, at UFC 124. Stevenson lost via a left hook KO as Danzig was moving back toward the cage. This loss was his first KO loss since 1999.

Stevenson suffered his third consecutive loss after falling short via unanimous decision to Danny Castillo on March 3, 2011, at UFC Live: Sanchez vs. Kampmann.

Stevenson was defeated by Javier Vazquez via unanimous decision in his featherweight debut on June 26, 2011, at UFC on Versus 4. After having four consecutive losses, Stevenson was released from the UFC. He became the fourth The Ultimate Fighter winner to be released from the UFC.

=== Post-UFC ===
Stevenson signed a new contract with the Resurrection Fighting Alliance (RFA). He fought Dakota Cochrane at Lightweight in the main event of RFA 3: Stevenson vs. Cochrane on Saturday, June 30, 2012, at the Viaero Event Center in Kearney, Nebraska. Stevenson was rocked early in the first round by a knee from Cochrane, yet Stevenson managed to take Cochrane down to control him throughout the round. At the start of the second round, Cochrane rocked Stevenson again and managed to secure a rear naked choke. Stevenson escaped the attempt, but Cochrane was able to quickly take Stevenson's back a second time and finished via submission due to a rear-naked choke.

Stevenson next fought Dominique Robinson at Sugar Shane Promotions on January 30, 2015. He lost the fight via split decision.

After a year-and-a-half away from the sport, Stevenson returned to the cage July 30, 2016, for the California Fight League. He faced Daniel McWilliams and won the fight via TKO in the first round.

Stevenson made a quick return to the cage, facing Gabriel Miglioli at Tru-Form Entertainment on August 26, 2016. He won the fight by unanimous decision.

Stevenson is a contestant of The Ultimate Fighter season 25, consisting of fighters that have been competing in previous The Ultimate Fighter seasons.

=== The Ultimate Fighter: Redemption ===
In February 2017, it was revealed that Stevenson would compete again on the UFC's reality show in the 25th season on The Ultimate Fighter: Redemption. Stevenson was the fifth pick overall for Team Dillashaw. He was defeated by Justin Edwards in the opening round of fights by unanimous decision. He was defeated by Hayder Hassan by knockout in the first round in the wildcard bout.

== Grappling career ==
Stevenson competed in the Southern California Pro-Am Invitational 2003, where he lost to Rener Gracie in the opening round.

== Television work ==
Stevenson signed on to play Fight Coach "Joe Daddy" for 3 episodes in the first season of the DirecTV 2014 series Kingdom. Ultimately he ended being a recurring character, appearing regularly in the episodes.

== Personal life ==
Stevenson's mother, Carolina Smith, hails from Victorville, California. Growing up, he is the only boy in a family of girls; he has an older sister, Monica, a younger sister, Reye, and a step sister, Jessica. When Stevenson was seventeen, his father, Raymond, died of bone marrow cancer.

Stevenson graduated from Silverado High School in 2000, where he was a standout wrestler. As a wrestler for the Silverado Hawks, he placed in CIF as a sophomore and senior (4th at Masters in March, 2000). Stevenson put his life on hold when his maternal grandfather suddenly became ill in 1999. After finishing high school in June, Stevenson married his first wife Lisa, continued to fight professionally for King of the Cage; and wrestled at Victor Valley College to become the 198-lb champion at the 2000 Southern California Community College Regionals (a title previously held by fellow-UFC-star, Tito Ortiz). Stevenson was up a few weight divisions due to his last-minute change of schedule with King of the Cage, and also because of his friend, teammate and two-time Community College All-American at 184, UFC fighter, Phillip Miller. He has two sons from his marriage to Lisa - Joe Jr. ("Joey") and Tyler. He is now married to Maia, and the couple have two sons, Frankie and Maximus.

Stevenson has struggled with alcoholism his whole adulthood, but claims to have been sober since 2014.

== Championships and achievements ==
- Ultimate Fighting Championship
  - The Ultimate Fighter 2 Welterweight Tournament Winner
  - Fight of the Night (Four times) vs. Yves Edwards, Diego Sanchez, Nate Diaz and George Sotiropoulos
  - Submission of the Night (Two times) vs. Dokonjonosuke Mishima and Melvin Guillard
  - First The Ultimate Fighter Tournament Winner in UFC Welterweight History
  - UFC Encyclopedia Awards
    - Fight of the Night (One time) vs. Josh Neer
  - UFC.com Awards
    - 2005: Ranked #9 Fight of the Year vs. Luke Cummo
    - 2007: Ranked #10 Submission of the Year vs. Melvin Guillard
- King of the Cage
  - KOTC Lightweight Champion (One time; fifth)
  - KOTC Welterweight Champion (One time; second)
- Ring of Fire
  - Ring of Fire Welterweight Championship
- Rage In The Cage
  - Rage In The Cage Welterweight Championship

=== Submission grappling ===
- Grapplers Quest
  - Grapplers Quest Hall of Fame

== Mixed martial arts record ==
Professional record breakdown
49 matches	33 wins	16 losses
By knockout	9	2
By submission	13	5
By decision	11	9

Res.	Record	Opponent	Method	Event	Date	Round	Time	Location	Notes
Win	33–16	Gabriel Miglioli	Decision (unanimous)	TFE Vengeance	August 26, 2016	3	5:00	Anaheim, California, United States	
Win	32–16	Daniel McWilliams	TKO (punches)	California Fight League 8: Stevenson vs McWilliams	July 30, 2016	1	1:21	San Bernardino, California, United States	
Loss	31–16	Dominique Robinson	Decision (split)	Super Brawl Showdown I	January 30, 2015	5	5:00	Phoenix, Arizona, United States	
Loss	31–15	Dakota Cochrane	Submission (rear-naked choke)	RFA 3: Stevenson vs. Cochrane	June 30, 2012	2	1:04	Kearney, Nebraska, United States	
Loss	31–14	Javier Vazquez	Decision (unanimous)	UFC Live: Kongo vs. Barry	June 26, 2011	3	5:00	Pittsburgh, Pennsylvania, United States	Featherweight debut
Loss	31–13	Danny Castillo	Decision (unanimous)	UFC Live: Sanchez vs. Kampmann	March 3, 2011	3	5:00	Louisville, Kentucky, United States	
Loss	31–12	Mac Danzig	KO (punch)	UFC 124	December 11, 2010	1	1:54	Montreal, Quebec, Canada	
Loss	31–11	George Sotiropoulos	Decision (unanimous)	UFC 110	February 21, 2010	3	5:00	Sydney, Australia	Fight of the Night.
Win	31–10	Spencer Fisher	TKO (submission to elbows)	UFC 104	October 24, 2009	2	4:03	Los Angeles, California, United States	
Win	30–10	Nate Diaz	Decision (unanimous)	The Ultimate Fighter: United States vs. United Kingdom Finale	June 20, 2009	3	5:00	Las Vegas, Nevada, United States	Fight of the Night
Loss	29–10	Diego Sanchez	Decision (unanimous)	UFC 95	February 21, 2009	3	5:00	London, England	Fight of the Night
Loss	29–9	Kenny Florian	Submission (rear-naked choke)	UFC 91	November 15, 2008	1	4:03	Las Vegas, Nevada, United States	
Win	29–8	Gleison Tibau	Submission (guillotine choke)	UFC 86	July 5, 2008	2	2:57	Las Vegas, Nevada, United States	
Loss	28–8	B.J. Penn	Submission (rear-naked choke)	UFC 80	January 19, 2008	2	4:02	Newcastle, England	For the vacant UFC Lightweight Championship.
Win	28–7	Kurt Pellegrino	Decision (unanimous)	UFC 74	August 25, 2007	3	5:00	Las Vegas, Nevada, United States	
Win	27–7	Melvin Guillard	Submission (guillotine choke)	UFC Fight Night: Stevenson vs. Guillard	April 5, 2007	1	0:27	Las Vegas, Nevada, United States	Submission of the Night.
Win	26–7	Dokonjonosuke Mishima	Submission (guillotine choke)	UFC 65: Bad Intentions	November 18, 2006	1	2:07	Sacramento, California, United States	Submission of the Night.
Win	25–7	Yves Edwards	TKO (doctor stoppage)	UFC 61: Bitter Rivals	July 8, 2006	2	5:00	Las Vegas, Nevada, United States	Return to Lightweight; Fight of the Night.
Loss	24–7	Josh Neer	Decision (unanimous)	UFC Fight Night 4	April 6, 2006	3	5:00	Las Vegas, Nevada, United States	
Win	24–6	Luke Cummo	Decision (unanimous)	The Ultimate Fighter 2 Finale	November 5, 2005	3	5:00	Las Vegas, Nevada, United States	Won The Ultimate Fighter Season 2 Welterweight Tournament.
Win	23–6	Joe Camacho	Submission (guillotine choke)	KOTC 33: After Shock	February 20, 2004	2	4:36	San Jacinto, California, United States	
Win	22–6	Cory Cass	Submission	GC 21: Gladiator Challenge 21	December 7, 2003	1	1:10	Porterville, California, United States	
Win	21–6	Thomas Schulte	KO (knee)	KOTC 30: The Pinnacle	November 2, 2003	1	3:29	Pala, California, United States	Won the KOTC Lightweight Championship.
Win	20–6	Demitrius Jefford	KO	GC 19: Gladiator Challenge 19	September 28, 2003	1	1:09	Porterville, California, United States	
Win	19–6	Kiko Cassela	TKO (corner stoppage)	KOTC 27: Aftermath	August 10, 2003	1	4:21	San Jacinto, California, United States	
Win	18–6	Thomas Denny	Submission (guillotine choke)	KOTC 23: Sin City	May 16, 2003	1	0:15	Las Vegas, Nevada, United States	
Win	17–6	Chuck Kim	Submission (armbar)	GC 15: Gladiator Challenge 15	April 13, 2003	1	1:03	Porterville, California, United States	
Win	16–6	Casey Balkenbush	TKO (elbows)	GC 14: Gladiator Challenge 14	February 16, 2003	1	2:27	Porterville, California, United States	
Loss	15–6	Romie Aram	Decision (unanimous)	KOTC 17: Nuclear Explosion	October 19, 2002	3	5:00	San Jacinto, California, United States	Lost the KOTC Welterweight Championship.
Win	15–5	Jeremy Jackson	TKO (submission to punches)	KOTC 15: Bad Intentions	June 22, 2002	1	1:27	San Jacinto, California, United States	Defended the KOTC Welterweight Championship.
Win	14–5	Cruz Chacon	Submission (kneebar)	Ring Of Fire Warriors 4	March 15, 2002	1	1:35	Denver, Colorado, United States	Won the Ring of Fire Welterweight Championship
Win	13–5	Jerry Gummo	Submission (rear-naked choke)	KOTC 12: Cold Blood	February 9, 2002	1	1:05	San Jacinto, California, United States	Defended the KOTC Welterweight Championship.
Win	12–5	Brad Gumm	Decision	UP 1: Ultimate Pankration 1	November 11, 2001	3	4:00	Cabazon, California, United States	
Win	11–5	Gary Aldar	TKO (punches)	GC 6: Caged Beasts	September 9, 2001	1	2:37	Colusa, California, United States	
Loss	10–5	Brad Gumm	Decision	GC 5: Rumble in the Rockies	August 19, 2001	3	5:00	Denver, Colorado, United States	
Win	10–4	Ryan Painter	Decision (split)	KOTC 10: Critical Mass	August 4, 2001	2	5:00	San Jacinto, California, United States	Defended the KOTC Welterweight Championship.
Win	9–4	Edwin Dewees	Decision (unanimous)	GC 4: Collision at Colusa	June 17, 2001	3	5:00	Colusa, California, United States	
Loss	8–4	Ronald Jhun	Decision (unanimous)	Warriors Quest 1: The New Beginning	May 29, 2001	3	5:00	Honolulu, Hawaii, United States	For the vacant Warriors Quest Middleweight Championship
Win	8–3	Maurice Wilson	Decision (unanimous)	GC 3: Showdown at Soboba	April 7, 2001	3	5:00	Friant, California, United States	
Win	7–3	Kai Kamaka	Submission (shoulder lock)	GC 2: Collision at Colusa	February 18, 2001	1	2:16	Colusa, California, United States	
Win	6–3	Eric Meaders	Decision (unanimous)	KOTC 6: Road Warriors	November 29, 2000	3	5:00	Mt. Pleasant, Michigan, United States	Won the KOTC Welterweight Championship.
Win	5–3	Mike Berardi	Decision (unanimous)	RITC 20: Rage in the Cage 20	August 30, 2000	3	3:00	Phoenix, Arizona, United States	Won the Rage In The Cage Welterweight Championship
Win	4–3	David Roberts	Submission	HBUP: Huntington Beach Underground Pancrase	May 13, 2000	1	N/A	Huntington Beach, California, United States	
Win	3–3	Toby Imada	Decision	KOTC 3: Knockout Nightmare	April 15, 2000	2	5:00	San Jacinto, California, United States	
Loss	2–3	Maurice Wilson	Submission (guillotine choke)	EFC: Extreme Fighter Challenge	February 2, 2000	2	N/A	California, United States	
Loss	2–2	Chris Brennan	Submission (triangle choke)	KOTC 1: Bas Rutten's King of the Cage	October 30, 1999	1	2:04	San Jacinto, California, United States	
Loss	2–1	Jens Pulver	KO (punch)	BRI 3: Bas Rutten Invitational 3	June 1, 1999	1	0:38	Colorado, United States	
Win	2–0	Steve Horton	Submission (rear-naked choke)	BRI 3: Bas Rutten Invitational 3	June 1, 1999	1	2:21	Colorado, United States	
Win	1–0	Joe Camacho	Submission (triangle choke)	ESF: Empire One	May 15, 1999	1	N/A	Corona, California, United States	

=== Mixed martial arts exhibition record ===
Exhibition record breakdown		
4 matches	2 wins	2 losses
By knockout	0	1
By submission	2	0
By decision	0	1

Res.	Record	Opponent	Method	Event	Date	Round	Time	Location	Notes
Loss	2–2	Hayder Hassan	KO (punch)	The Ultimate Fighter: Redemption	June 7, 2017 (airdate)	1	0:18	Las Vegas, Nevada, United States	The Ultimate Fighter: Redemption Wild Card fight
Loss	2–1	Justin Edwards	Decision (unanimous)	The Ultimate Fighter: Redemption	May 31, 2017 (airdate)	2	5:00	Las Vegas, Nevada, United States	The Ultimate Fighter: Redemption opening round
win	2–0	Jason Von Flue	Submission (armbar)	The Ultimate Fighter 2	November 1, 2005 (airdate)	1	4:46	Las Vegas, Nevada, United States	The Ultimate Fighter 2 semi-finals
Win	1–0	Marcus Davis	Submission (elbows)	The Ultimate Fighter 2	September 5, 2005 (airdate)	1	4:10	Las Vegas, Nevada, United States	The Ultimate Fighter 2 quarter-finals
