= John Alessio =

Canadian mixed martial arts fighter

- Born: July 5, 1979 (age 47); Vancouver, British Columbia, Canada
- Other names: The Natural
- Nationality: Canadian
- Height: 5 ft 10 in (1.78 m)
- Weight: 155 lb (70 kg; 11.1 st)
- Division: Lightweight; Welterweight
- Reach: 75 in (191 cm)
- Fighting out of: Las Vegas, Nevada, United States
- Team: Xtreme Couture
- Years active: 1998–2015

Mixed martial arts record
- Total: 54
- Wins: 35
- By knockout: 11
- By submission: 14
- By decision: 8
- Unknown: 2
- Losses: 17
- By knockout: 2
- By submission: 7
- By decision: 7
- By disqualification: 1
- No contests: 2

Other information
- Mixed martial arts record from Sherdog

John Paul Alessio (born July 5, 1979) is a Canadian retired professional mixed martial artist. A former competitor in Bellator's Lightweight division. A professional competitor since 1998, Alessio has also formerly competed for the UFC where he was a former Welterweight title challenger, the WEC, PRIDE, King of the Cage, MFC and DREAM. Alessio is also the former King of the Cage Welterweight Champion and King of the Cage Superfight Champion.

== Background ==
Alessio was born and raised Duncan, British Columbia, where he began training in Brazilian jiu-jitsu and kickboxing, before moving to San Jose, California at the age of 19 in order to pursue his dream of becoming a professional fighter. During his professional mixed martial arts career, Alessio has also won two national BMX trick biking championships.

== Mixed martial arts career ==
=== Ultimate Fighting Championship ===
Alessio made his UFC debut at just 20 years old at UFC 26 on June 9, 2000, when he faced Pat Miletich. He lost the fight via armbar submission in the second round.

=== EliteXC ===
Alessio then signed a three-fight contract with EliteXC. However, he did not fight for the promotion before they ceased operations in October 2008.

=== Ultimate Glory ===
Alessio faced Sergey Golyaev at Ultimate Glory 12 on October 16, 2010. He won the fight in the second round via kimura.

Alessio then fought Siyar Bahadurzada in the United Glory welterweight semifinals on January 30, 2011, in Charleroi, Belgium and was beaten via TKO in the first round.

=== Return to UFC ===
On April 3, 2012, it was reported that Alessio has returned to the UFC to replace an injured Matt Wiman and face Mark Bocek at UFC 145. Alessio was defeated via unanimous decision (30-27, 29-28, 30-27).

Alessio then faced Shane Roller on July 7, 2012, at UFC 148. He lost the fight via unanimous decision.

Following his loss to Roller, Alessio was subsequently released from the UFC.

=== Aggression Fighting Championship ===
On September 13, Alessio signed with Aggression Fighting Championship. He headlined their AFC 13 show in Victoria, British Columbia on November 3. Alessio faced Dave Mazany in the main event. The bout ended in No Contest due to Mazany accidentally poking Alessio in the eye.

=== Bellator MMA ===
Alessio was scheduled to fight Tim Radcliffe at Global Warrior Challenge on June 29, 2013. However, he announced on Twitter on June 8 that a staph infection forced him to withdraw from the bout. Following that, Alessio announced that he had signed with Bellator MMA and will fight in the Lightweight tournament.

Alessio was originally scheduled to face Guillaume De Lorenzi at Bellator 119 on May 9, 2014. However, De Lorenzi was forced out of the bout due to injury, and Alessio instead fought Eric Wisely at the event. He won the fight via unanimous decision.

Alessio faced David Rickels at Bellator 139 on June 26, 2015. The fight was declared a no contest in the first round after Rickles landed an unintentional illegal knee rendering Alessio unable to continue.

== Personal life ==
Alessio married Noelani Timas, an Import Tuner model known as Noelani Chase on June 9, 2010, in Las Vegas, Nevada. and he has one son prior to the relationship.

== Championships and accomplishments ==
- TKO Major League MMA
  - TKO World Welterweight Championship (One-time)
- KOTC Welterweight Championship
  - KOTC Welterweight Championship (One time)
- Tachi Palace Fights
  - TPF Welterweight Championship (One time)
- United Glory
  - 2010-2011 Welterweight Tournament Semi-Finalist
- SuperBrawl
  - SuperBrawl 16 Middleweight Tournament Winner
- Ultimate Fighting Championship
  - Youngest fighter to compete for a UFC Championship (20 years 11 months 4 days)

== Mixed martial arts record ==
Professional record breakdown
54 matches	35 wins	17 losses
By knockout	10	2
By submission	17	7
By decision	8	7
By disqualification	0	1
No contests	2	

Res.	Record	Opponent	Method	Event	Date	Round	Time	Location	Notes
NC	35–17 (2)	David Rickels	NC (illegal knee)	Bellator 139	June 26, 2015	1	2:24	Mulvane, Kansas, United States	
Win	35–17 (1)	Eric Wisely	Decision (unanimous)	Bellator 119	May 9, 2014	3	5:00	Rama, Ontario, Canada	
Loss	34–17 (1)	Will Brooks	Decision (unanimous)	Bellator 101	September 27, 2013	3	5:00	Portland, Oregon, United States	Bellator Season 9 Lightweight Tournament Quarterfinal
NC	34–16 (1)	Dave Mazany	No Contest (eye poke)	AFC 13: Natural Selection	November 3, 2012	1	N/A	Victoria, British Columbia, Canada	
Loss	34–16	Shane Roller	Decision (unanimous)	UFC 148	July 7, 2012	3	5:00	Las Vegas, Nevada, United States	
Loss	34–15	Mark Bocek	Decision (unanimous)	UFC 145	April 21, 2012	3	5:00	Atlanta, Georgia, United States	
Win	34–14	Ryan Healy	Decision (unanimous)	Score Fighting Series 4	March 16, 2012	3	5:00	Hamilton, Ontario, Canada	
Win	33–14	Luiz Firmino	Decision (unanimous)	Superior Cage Combat 3	November 4, 2011	3	5:00	Las Vegas, Nevada, United States	Dropped to Lightweight.
Win	32–14	Shawn Fitzsimmons	Submission (rear-naked choke)	Superior Cage Combat 2	August 20, 2011	2	3:52	Las Vegas, Nevada, United States	
Loss	31–14	Siyar Bahadurzada	TKO (punches)	United Glory 13	March 19, 2011	1	1:55	Charleroi, Belgium	Welterweight Tournament Semifinal bout.
Win	31–13	Phil Collins	TKO (punches)	TPF 7: Deck the Halls	December 2, 2010	3	0:35	Lemoore, California, United States	Won the Vacant Tachi Palace Fights Welterweight Championship.
Win	30–13	Sergey Golyaev	Submission (kimura)	United Glory 12	October 16, 2010	2	2:51	Amsterdam, Netherlands	Welterweight Tournament quarterfinal bout.
Win	29–13	War Machine	Submission (rear-naked choke)	TPF 5: Stars and Strikes	July 9, 2010	3	2:24	Lemoore, California, United States	
Win	28–13	Chris Clements	Submission (guillotine choke)	W-1 MMA 4: Bad Blood	March 20, 2010	1	4:24	Montreal, Quebec, Canada	
Win	27–13	Matt Delanoit	Submission (rear-naked choke)	ROF 37: Warlords	March 5, 2010	1	2:46	Omaha, Nebraska, United States	
Win	26–13	Luigi Fioravanti	KO (punches)	MFC 22	October 2, 2009	3	1:34	Edmonton, Alberta, Canada	
Win	25–13	Andrew Buckland	Submission (rear-naked choke)	MFC 21	May 16, 2009	1	2:53	Enoch, Alberta, Canada	
Loss	24–13	André Galvão	Submission (armbar)	Dream 8	April 5, 2009	1	7:34	Nagoya, Japan	Welterweight Grand Prix First Round.
Loss	24–12	Paul Daley	KO (punches)	MFC 19: Long Time Coming	December 5, 2008	2	2:18	Enoch, Alberta, Canada	
Win	24–11	Gideon Ray	TKO (punches)	SuperFights MMA: Night of Combat 2	October 11, 2008	1	0:45	Las Vegas, Nevada, United States	
Win	23–11	Pete Spratt	Submission (rear-naked choke)	Banner Promotions: Night of Combat	June 20, 2008	2	2:07	Las Vegas, Nevada, United States	
Loss	22–11	Brock Larson	DQ (knee to downed fighter)	WEC 33: Marshall vs. Stann	March 26, 2008	1	1:50	Paradise, Nevada, United States	
Win	22–10	Todd Moore	Decision (unanimous)	WEC 31	December 12, 2007	3	5:00	Paradise, Nevada, United States	
Win	21–10	Marcelo Brito	Decision (unanimous)	WEC 30	September 5, 2007	3	5:00	Las Vegas, Nevada, United States	
Win	20–10	Alex Serdyukov	Submission (guillotine choke)	WEC 28	June 3, 2007	1	1:17	Las Vegas, Nevada, United States	
Loss	19–10	Carlos Condit	Submission (rear-naked choke)	WEC 26: Condit vs. Alessio	March 24, 2007	2	4:59	Las Vegas, Nevada, United States	For the WEC Welterweight Championship.
Win	19–9	Brian Gassaway	Submission (rear-naked choke)	WEC 25	January 20, 2007	1	4:50	Las Vegas, Nevada, United States	
Loss	18–9	Thiago Alves	Decision (unanimous)	Ortiz vs. Shamrock 3: The Final Chapter	October 10, 2006	3	5:00	Hollywood, Florida, United States	
Win	18–8	Alex Serdyukov	Submission (rear-naked choke)	WEC 23: Hot August Fights	August 17, 2006	3	1:52	Lemoore, California, United States	
Loss	17–8	Diego Sanchez	Decision (unanimous)	UFC 60: Hughes vs. Gracie	May 27, 2006	3	5:00	Los Angeles, California, United States	
Win	17–7	Savant Young	Submission (rear-naked choke)	KOTC: Shock and Awe	October 1, 2005	3	2:09	Edmonton, Alberta, Canada	
Win	16–7	Shannon Ritch	TKO (punches)	KOTC 58: Prime Time	August 5, 2005	1	0:41	San Jacinto, California, United States	
Loss	15–7	Jonathan Goulet	Decision (split)	TKO 18: Impact	November 26, 2004	3	5:00	Montreal, Quebec, Canada	
Win	15–6	Brandon Olsen	Submission (armbar)	ETB: Enter the Beast	March 6, 2004	1	2:59	Nanaimo, British Columbia, Canada	
Win	14–6	Ronald Jhun	Decision (unanimous)	KOTC 29: Renegades	September 5, 2003	3	5:00	San Jacinto, California, United States	Won the KOTC Welterweight Championship. Later vacated title.
Loss	13–6	Jason Black	Decision (split)	UCC 12: Adrenaline	January 25, 2003	3	5:00	Montreal, Quebec, Canada	
Win	13–5	Eiji Mitsuoka	TKO (doctor stoppage)	PRIDE The Best Vol.2	July 20, 2002	2	3:13	Tokyo, Japan	
Win	12–5	Chris Brennan	TKO (punches)	KOTC 15: Bad Intentions	June 22, 2002	1	2:20	San Jacinto, California, United States	
Win	11–5	John Delao	TKO (punches)	World Freestyle Fighting 1	April 13, 2002	1	1:22	Kelowna, British Columbia, Canada	
Win	10–5	Nassor Lewis	Submission (rear-naked choke)	KOTC 12: Cold Blood	February 9, 2002	1	2:07	San Jacinto, California, United States	
Win	9–5	Sean Pierson	KO (head kick)	UCC 7: Bad Boyz	January 25, 2002	2	1:14	Montreal, Quebec, Canada	
Win	8–5	Thomas Denny	Submission (keylock)	KOTC 11: Domination	September 29, 2001	1	1:55	San Jacinto, California, United States	
Loss	7–5	Joe Doerksen	Submission (rear-naked choke)	Superbrawl: Futurebrawl 2000	November 14, 2000	2	3:48	Honolulu, Hawaii, United States	
Loss	7–4	Pat Miletich	Submission (armbar)	UFC 26	June 9, 2000	2	1:43	Cedar Rapids, Iowa, United States	For the UFC Welterweight Championship.
Win	7–3	Jay R. Palmer	Submission (rear-naked choke)	SuperBrawl 16	February 8, 2000	1	1:20	Honolulu, Hawaii, United States	Won the SuperBrawl 16 Middleweight Tournament
Win	6–3	John Chrisostomo	TKO (punches)	SuperBrawl 16	February 8, 2000	2	3:04	Honolulu, Hawaii, United States	SuperBrawl 16 Middleweight Tournament Semifinals
Loss	5–3	Egan Inoue	Submission (rear-naked choke)	SuperBrawl 15	December 7, 1999	1	2:41	Honolulu, Hawaii, United States	
Win	5–2	Jason Meaders	Decision (unanimous)	Neutral Grounds 13	November 20, 1999	3	5:00	Lakeside, California, United States	
Loss	4–2	Kousei Kubota	Submission (kimura)	Pancrase: Breakthrough 9	October 25, 1999	1	10:53	Tokyo, Japan	
Win	4–1	Fritz Borchardt	TKO (strikes)	Extreme Challenge 28	October 9, 1999	1	2:12	Ogden, Utah, United States	
Win	3–1	Ben Earwood	Decision (split)	Extreme Challenge 28	October 9, 1999	1	13:00	Ogden, Utah, United States	
Loss	2–1	David Harris	Submission (rear-naked choke)	Bas Rutten Invitational 2	April 24, 1999	1	8:32	Littleton, Colorado, United States	
Win	2–0	Derek McClinton	Submission (heel hook)	Ultimate Battle	May 17, 1998	1	1:44	Victoria, British Columbia, Canada	
Win	1–0	Mike Headley	Submission (arm-triangle choke)	Ultimate Battle	May 17, 1998	1	5:28	Victoria, British Columbia, Canada	

== See also ==
- List of Bellator MMA alumni
- List of Canadian UFC fighters
- List of male mixed martial artists
