= 2002 in King of the Cage =

Information
- First date: February 9, 2002
- Last date: December 15, 2002

Events
- Total events: 9

Fights
- Total fights: 97
- Title fights: 13

Chronology
2001 in KOTC	2002 in King of the Cage	2003 in KOTC

The year 2002 is the fourth year in the history of King of the Cage, a mixed martial arts promotion based in the United States. In 2002 King of the Cage held 9 events, KOTC 7: Cold Blood.

== Title fights ==
Title fights in 2002
Weight class				Method	Round	Time	Event	Notes
Super Heavyweight	Dan Bobish	def.	Eric Pele	TKO (Corner Stoppage)	2	1:10	KOTC 12: Cold Blood	(Note: For the King of the Cage Super Heavyweight Championship.)
Bantamweight	Charlie Valencia	def.	David Velasquez	Submission (Rear-Naked Choke)	1	4:43	KOTC 12: Cold Blood	(Note: For The King of the Cage Bantamweight Championship.)
Welterweight	Joe Stevenson (c)	def.	Jerry Gummo	Submission (Rear-Naked Choke)	1	1:05	KOTC 12: Cold Blood	(Note: For The King of the Cage Welterweight Championship.)
Super Heavyweight	Dan Bobish (c)	def.	Mike Kyle	Submission (Punches)	1	3:25	KOTC 13: Revolution	(Note: For the King of the Cage Super Heavyweight Championship.)
Lightweight	Javier Vazquez (c)	def.	Sean Wilmot	Submission (Armbar)	1	1:57	KOTC 13: Revolution	(Note: For the King of the Cage Lightweight Championship.)
Middleweight	John Alessio	def.	Chris Brennan (c)	TKO (Punches)	1	2:20	KOTC 15: Bad Intentions	(Note: For The King of the Cage Middleweight Championship.)
Welterweight	Joe Stevenson (c)	def.	Jeremy Jackson	Submission (Punches)	1	1:27	KOTC 15: Bad Intentions	(Note: For the King of the Cage Welterweight Championship.)
Super Heavyweight	Jimmy Ambriz	def.	Dan Bobish (c)	Submission (Punches)	1	0:46	KOTC 16: Double Cross	(Note: For The King of the Cage Super Heavyweight Championship.)
Light Heavyweight	Vernon White (c)	def.	Mike Rogers	Decision (Split)	3	5:00	KOTC 16: Double Cross	(Note: For The King of the Cage Light Heavyweight Championship.)
Lightweight	Javier Vazquez (c)	def.	David Gardner	Submission (Kneebar)	1	4:31	KOTC 16: Double Cross	(Note: For The King of the Cage Lightweight Championship.)
Middleweight	Dean Lister	def.	Brendan Seguin	Submission (Armbar)	3	4:37	KOTC 16: Double Cross	(Note: For the King of the Cage Middleweight Championship.)
Welterweight	Romie Aram	def.	Joe Stevenson (c)	Decision (Unanimous)	3	5:00	KOTC 17: Nuclear Explosion	(Note: For the King of the Cage Welterweight Championship.)
Super Heavyweight	Jimmy Ambriz (c)	def.	Vince Lucero	Submission (Arm-Triangle Choke)	1	4:33	KOTC 19: Street Fighter	(Note: For the King of the Cage Super Heavyweight Championship.)

== Events list ==
#	Event title	Date	Arena	Location
20	KOTC 20: Crossroads	December 15, 2002	Santa Ana Star Casino	Bernalillo, New Mexico
19	KOTC 19: Street Fighter	December 7, 2002	Soboba Casino	San Jacinto, California
18	KOTC 18: Sudden Impact	November 1, 2002	Silver Legacy Resort Casino	Reno, Nevada
17	KOTC 17: Nuclear Explosion	October 19, 2002	Soboba Casino	San Jacinto, California
16	KOTC 16: Double Cross	August 2, 2002	Soboba Casino	San Jacinto, California
15	KOTC 15: Bad Intentions	June 22, 2002	Soboba Casino	San Jacinto, California
14	KOTC 14: 5150	June 19, 2002	Santa Ana Star Casino	Bernalillo, New Mexico
13	KOTC 13: Revolution	May 13, 2002	Silver Legacy Resort Casino	Reno, Nevada
12	KOTC 12: Cold Blood	February 9, 2002	Soboba Casino	San Jacinto, California

== KOTC 12: Cold Blood ==
KOTC 12: Cold Blood was an event held on February 9, 2002 at the Soboba Casino in San Jacinto, California, United States.

=== Results ===
Main Card
Weight class				Method	Round	Time	Notes
Super Heavyweight	Dan Bobish	def.	Eric Pele	TKO (Corner Stoppage)	2	1:10	(Note: For The King of the Cage Super Heavyweight Championship.)
Bantamweight	Charlie Valencia	def.	David Velasquez	Submission (Rear-Naked Choke)	1	4:43	(Note: For the King of the Cage Bantamweight Championship.)
	Dean Lister	def.	Jacen Flynn	Submission (Kimura)	2	4:28
	Jason Lambert	def.	Jason Jones	TKO (Punches)	2	1:17
	Fernando Vasconcelos	def.	John Chrisostomo	TKO (Punches)	1	3:00
	John Alessio	def.	Nassor Lewis	Submission (Rear-Naked Choke)	1	2:07
Welterweight	Joe Stevenson (c)	def.	Jerry Gummo	Submission (Rear-Naked Choke)	1	1:05	(Note: For The King of the Cage Welterweight Championship.)
	Phillip Miller	def.	John Hosegood	KO (Punches)	1	3:43
	Thomas Denny	def.	Ray Perales	Submission (Armbar)	1	2:31
	Randy Velarde	def.	Thomas Kenney	Submission (Armbar)	1	3:15
	Adam Lynn	def.	Brian Warren	Decision	2	5:00

== KOTC 13: Revolution ==
KOTC 13: Revolution was an event held on May 17, 2002 at the Silver Legacy Resort Casino in Reno, Nevada, United States.

=== Results ===
Main Card
Weight class				Method	Round	Time	Notes
Super Heavyweight	Dan Bobish (c)	def.	Mike Kyle	Submission (Punches)	1	3:25	(Note: For The King of the Cage Super Heavyweight Championship.)
Lightweight	Javier Vazquez (c)	def.	Sean Wilmot	Submission (Armbar)	1	1:57	(Note: For The King of the Cage Lightweight Championship.)
	Quinton Jackson	def.	Sean Gray	TKO (Punches)	3	0:37
	Akira Shoji	def.	David Roberts	Submission (Armbar)	2	4:46
	Mike Rogers	def.	Joey Guel	Submission (Triangle Choke)	1	4:45
	David Fox	def.	Rocky Batastini	DQ (Illegal Knee)	1	0:00
	Phillip Miller	def.	Roberto Ramirez	Submission (Punches)	1	4:14
	Cal Worsham	def.	Rick Collup	Submission (Punches)	1	1:37
	Joey Villasenor	def.	Tim Credeur	Submission (Punches)	2	3:24

== KOTC 14: 5150 ==
KOTC 14: 5150 was an event held on June 19, 2002 at the Santa Ana Star Casino in Bernalillo, New Mexico, United States.

=== Results ===
Main Card
Weight class				Method	Round	Time	Notes
	Dan Severn	def.	John Jensen	TKO (Corner Stoppage)	1	5:00
	Paul Buentello	def.	Roger Neff	KO (Head Kick)	1	3:04
	Alberto Crane	def.	Nick Shadwick	Submission (Rear-Naked Choke)	1	1:39
	George Allen	def.	Jimmy Westfall	Submission (Rear-Naked Choke)	1	2:55
	Thomas Schulte	def.	Mark Beacher	Submission (Armbar)	1	1:34
	Joey Villasenor	def.	Todd Carney	Submission (Rear-Naked Choke)	1	1:47
	Keith Jardine	def.	Philip Preece	Decision (Unanimous)	2	5:00
	Joe Merit	def.	Shannon Ritch	KO (Knee)	1	1:46
	Jesse Contaeras	def.	Nick Roscorla	Submission (Rear-Naked Choke)	2	4:54
	Isaias Martinez	def.	Mike Lee	Submission (Rear-Naked Choke)	1	1:15

== KOTC 15: Bad Intentions ==
KOTC 15: Bad Intentions was an event held on June 22, 2002 at the Soboba Casino in San Jacinto, California, United States.

=== Results ===
Main Card
Weight class				Method	Round	Time	Notes
Middleweight	John Alessio	def.	Chris Brennan (c)	TKO (Punches)	1	2:20	(Note: For The King of the Cage Middleweight Championship.)
Welterweight	Joe Stevenson (c)	def.	Jeremy Jackson	Submission (Punches)	1	1:27	(Note: For The King of the Cage Welterweight Championship.)
	Brent Stevens	def.	Kent Hensley	Decision	2	5:00
	Betiss Mansouri	def.	Eddy Ellis	Submission (Triangle Choke)	1	1:15
	Joey Guel	def.	Jess Liaudin	TKO (Punches)	1	2:31
	Jason Lambert	def.	Lobo Lobo	TKO (Punches)	1	3:01
	Cipi Gamino	def.	Aaron Anderson	Submission (Guillotine Choke)	1	3:17
	John Cole	def.	Richard Solis	Decision	2	5:00
	Jason Dolder	def.	Josh Lewis	Submission (Choke)	1	2:31
	Danny Byrket	def.	Justin Masely	Submission (Choke)	1	1:07

== KOTC 16: Double Cross ==
KOTC 16: Double Cross was an event held on August 2, 2002 at the Soboba Casino in San Jacinto, California, United States.

=== Results ===
Main Card
Weight class				Method	Round	Time	Notes
Super Heavyweight	Jimmy Ambriz	def.	Dan Bobish (c)	Submission (Punches)	1	0:46	(Note: For The King of the Cage Super Heavyweight Championship.)
Light Heavyweight	Vernon White (c)	def.	Mike Rogers	Decision (Split)	3	5:00	(Note: For the King of the Cage Light Heavyweight Championship.)
Lightweight	Javier Vazquez (c)	def.	David Gardner	Submission (Kneebar)	1	4:31	(Note: For the King of the Cage Lightweight Championship.)
Middleweight	Dean Lister	def.	Brendan Seguin	Submission (Armbar)	3	4:37	(Note: For the King of the Cage Middleweight Championship.)
	Christian Wellisch	def.	Sam Sotello	Submission (Rear-Naked Choke)	1	4:20
	Shonie Carter	def.	Randy Velarde	Submission (Rear-Naked Choke)	1	4:53
	Brian Hawkins	def.	Todd Medina	TKO (Cut)	1	5:00
	Thomas Denny	def.	Jeff Lindsay	Decision (Unanimous)	2	5:00
	Brian Warren	def.	Louie Vaith	Decision (Unanimous)	2	5:00
	David Ortiz	def.	Kelly Johnson	Submission (Punches)	1	1:10

== KOTC 17: Nuclear Explosion ==
KOTC 17: Nuclear Explosion was an event held on October 19, 2002 at the Soboba Casino in San Jacinto, California, United States.

=== Results ===
Main Card
Weight class				Method	Round	Time	Notes
Welterweight	Romie Aram	def.	Joe Stevenson (c)	Decision (Unanimous)	3	5:00	(Note: For the King of the Cage Welterweight Championship.)
	Fernando Vasconcelos	def.	Marcus Santos	Submission (Rear-Naked Choke)	1	3:54
	Joe Crilly	def.	Adam Brooks	Decision (Unanimous)	2	5:00
	Art Santore	def.	David Roberts	Submission (Punches)	1	2:52
	Jason Lambert	def.	Joshua Hoag	TKO (Punches)	1	1:25
	Fred George	def.	Cliff Jacobs	TKO (Corner Stoppage)	1	5:00
	Thomas Denny	def.	Aaron Anderson	Submission (Punches)	1	3:40
	Debi Purcell	def.	Nicole Albrect	Decision (Unanimous)	2	5:00
	Brent Stevens	def.	Mike Bourke	KO (Punches)	1	0:38
	Dave Rivas	def.	Cipi Gamino	Submission (Rear-Naked Choke)	1	3:40
	Richard Solis	def.	Ricky Libertini	TKO (Punches)	2	1:45
	Jesus Morales	def.	Josh Lewis	Submission (Forearm Choke)	1	1:06
	Shad Smith	def.	Chris Jeffers	Submission (Leg Injury)	1	0:08
	Alex Richard	def.	Mark McClelland	Submission (Guillotine Choke)	1	1:34

== KOTC 18: Sudden Impact ==
KOTC 18: Sudden Impact was an event held on November 1, 2002 at the Silver Legacy Resort Casino in Reno, Nevada, United States.

=== Results ===
Main Card
Weight class				Method	Round	Time	Notes
	Paul Buentello	def.	Mike Kyle	KO (Punches)	2	1:24
	Dan Severn	def.	Mark Smith	Submission (Keylock)	1	2:56
	Seth Petruzelli	def.	Rocky Batastini	TKO (Punches)	1	4:04
	Dennis Hallman	def.	Betiss Mansouri	Submission (Triangle Choke)	1	3:39
	Jason House	def.	James Fanshier	Submission (Armbar)	3	0:36
	Chad Bannon	def.	Rick Collup	KO (Punches)	1	0:20
	Jim Walker	def.	Gary Grate	DQ (Illegal Headbutt)	2	1:31
	Sean Gray	def.	Brian Foster	Submission (Kimura)	2	3:06
	Chad Davis	def.	Roberto Ramirez	Submission (Punches)	1	2:51

== KOTC 19: Street Fighter ==
KOTC 19: Street Fighter was an event held on December 7, 2002 at the Soboba Casino in San Jacinto, California, United States.

=== Results ===
Main Card
Weight class				Method	Round	Time	Notes
Super Heavyweight	Jimmy Ambriz (c)	def.	Vince Lucero	Submission (Arm-Triangle Choke)	1	4:33	(Note: For the King of the Cage Super Heavyweight Championship.)
	Dennis Hallman	vs.	Ronald Jhun	Draw	2	5:00
	Shad Smith	def.	Mike Bertuccini	TKO (Doctor Stoppage)	1	4:00
	Wade Shipp	def.	Raul Delgado	Submission (Rear-Naked Choke)	1	0:39
	Jamal Perkins	def.	Robert Emerson	Decision (Unanimous)	2	5:00
	Joe Camacho	def.	Matt Stansell	TKO (Doctor Stoppage)	1	5:00
	Joe Crilly	def.	John Cole	TKO (Punches)	1	4:30
	Reggie Cardiel	def.	Freddie Duran	Submission (Guillotine Choke)	1	2:02
	Thomas Kenney	def.	Steve White	Decision (Unanimous)	2	5:00
	Matt McPherson	def.	Asher King	Decision (Unanimous)	2	5:00
	Mansour Heidari	def.	Louis Jablonski	TKO (Punches)	1	4:20
	Louie Vaith	def.	Danny Byrket	TKO (Punches)	1	3:35
	Timothy Mendoza	def.	Lobo Lobo	Submission (Punches)	2	2:35
	Frankie Bollinger	def.	Cesar Moreno	TKO (Punches)	2	1:47

== KOTC 20: Crossroads ==
KOTC 20: Crossroads was an event held on December 15, 2002 at the Santa Ana Star Casino in Bernalillo, New Mexico, United States.

=== Results ===
Main Card
Weight class				Method	Round	Time	Notes
	Joey Villasenor	def.	Lorn Estes	Submission (Punches)	1	1:43
	Alberto Crane	def.	Joe Vigil	Submission (Triangle Choke)	1	3:17
	Keith Jardine	def.	Bryan Pardoe	KO (Punches)	1	1:09
	Thomas Schulte	def.	Kyle Brees	Technical Submission (Rear-Naked Choke)	1	1:15
	Diego Sanchez	def.	Shannon Ritch	Submission (Rear-Naked Choke)	1	0:59
	Forrest Griffin	def.	Steve Sayegh	Submission (Punches)	1	1:45
	John Mahlow	def.	Frank Marquez	Submission (Armbar)	2	0:29
	Bain Serna	def.	Brad Woolard	TKO (Punches)	1	1:34
	John Cronk	def.	Chris Meyers	TKO (Knees and Punches)	1	1:54
	Del Hawkins	def.	Bryan Kominiha	KO (Head Kick)	1	1:36

== See also ==
- King of the Cage
- List of King of the Cage events
- List of King of the Cage champions
