= Chris Brennan =

American mixed martial arts fighter

- Born: October 12, 1971 (age 55); Compton, California, United States
- Other names: The Westside Strangler
- Height: 5 ft 8 in (1.73 m)
- Weight: 155 lb (70 kg; 11.1 st)
- Division: Middleweight; Welterweight; Lightweight
- Reach: 72 in (183 cm)
- Style: Brazilian jiu-jitsu
- Stance: Orthodox
- Fighting out of: Frisco, Texas, United States; Compton, California
- Team: Torrance Academy (until 1997); Next Generation MMA (1998–present)
- Rank: 6th degree black belt in Brazilian Jiu-Jitsu under Ricardo Miller
- Years active: 1996–2012

Mixed martial arts record
- Total: 35
- Wins: 21
- By knockout: 1
- By submission: 19
- By decision: 1
- Losses: 13
- By knockout: 4
- By submission: 5
- By decision: 4
- Draws: 1

Other information
- Mixed martial arts record from Sherdog

Chris Brennan (born October 12, 1971) is an American mixed martial artist who last competed in the Welterweight division. A professional competitor from 1996 until 2012, he competed for the UFC, PRIDE, Cage Rage, King of the Cage and Shooto. He is a former King of the Cage Middleweight Champion and former King of the Cage Middleweight Superfight Champion. He is also one of 18 fighters to compete in the -77 kg division at the ADCC Submission Wrestling World Championships in 2005. Chris was also the founder of Nogi Industries, a mixed martial arts clothing company. In 2014 Chris was inducted in to the Mixed Martial Arts Hall of Fame. Chris is the owner and founder of Next Generation MMA. After retiring from MMA competition Chris switched his focus back to grappling events and also entered and won the No-Gi Black Belt World Championships in 2013, 2014, and 2015 in the seniors class of the middleweight division. He was also the 2013 and 2014 no-gi Pan American Champion.

== Background ==
Brennan was born in Compton, California, but soon moved to Orange County before settling in Laguna Hills and Huntington Beach, California, where he spent the next 10 years. Growing up, Brennan claims that he lived in at least 19 different homes and played baseball and soccer, but was ultimately more interested in individual sports such as bodybuilding, surfing, gymnastics, and motocross. While working as a bouncer, Brennan saw UFC 1 and was motivated by the dominant performance of UFC Hall of Famer Royce Gracie. Brennan soon began training with Gracie himself and received his Brazilian jiu-jitsu black belt in only seven years. Brennan later became the first no-gi Brazilian jiu-jitsu instructor in the United States.

== Mixed martial arts career ==
=== Early career ===
Brennan made his professional mixed martial arts debut in 1996 and compiled a record of 4–1–1 before being signed by the UFC.

=== UFC ===
Brennan made his UFC debut against Courtney Turner at the UFC 16 Lightweight Tournament on March 13, 1998, and won via armbar submission in the first round. In his next fight later that night, Brennan lost to future five-time champion, Pat Miletich via submission.

=== King of the Cage ===
Brennan made his King of the Cage debut against future King of the Cage Lightweight Champion Joe Stevenson and won via submission. In his next fight, Brennan fought against future MFC Lightweight Champion Antonio McKee for the King of the Cage Middleweight Superfight Championship and won via knockout with a head kick. In his first title defense, Brennan was defeated by Joe Hurley after he was knocked out from elbows.

On August 4, 2001, Brennan defeated Kevin Hogan via armbar submission to become the new King of the Cage Middleweight Champion and then in his next fight, successfully defended his title against Steve Berger. After a one-fight stint with the UFC at UFC 35, a loss to Gil Castillo, Brennan won two more fights outside of King of the Cage before returning to defend his title again, this time against John Alessio. Brennan was defeated via TKO.

=== PRIDE ===
Brennan went 0–2 in Shooto, losing a controversial decision to Takanori Gomi before he made his PRIDE debut on October 5, 2003, at Bushido 1 against Eiji Mitsuoka and won via kimura submission in the first round. In his next appearance for the organization, he faced Daiju Takase a year later at Bushido 2 and lost via unanimous decision.

His last fight in PRIDE was at Bushido 12 against Tatsuya Kawajiri, and he was defeated via TKO only 29 seconds into the first round.

=== Post-PRIDE ===
Since his last fight in PRIDE, Brennan has gone 2–2, competing for Cage Rage and King of the Cage.

== Championships and accomplishments ==
- King of the Cage
  - KOTC Middleweight Championship (One time; first)
  - Two Successful Defenses
  - KOTC Middleweight Superfight Championship (One time; first)
  - One Successful Defense
- Ultimate Fighting Championship
  - UFC 16 Lightweight Tournament Runner Up

As a professional MMA fighter his 21 wins were: 18 first round submissions, 1 second round submission, 1 second round KO, and 1 three round unanimous decision, a 95% finish rate, amongst the highest in MMA.

- 2013 IBJJF Black-Belt No-Gi World Champion
- 2014 IBJJF Black-Belt No-Gi World Champion
- 2015 IBJJF Black-Belt No-Gi World Champion
- 2014 Pan-Am No-Gi Champion
- Between 2013 and 2015 in 20 grappling matches only four total points scored against

== Mixed martial arts record ==
Professional record breakdown
36 matches	21 wins	14 losses
By knockout	1	4
By submission	19	6
By decision	1	4
Draws	1	

Res.	Record	Opponent	Method	Event	Date	Round	Time	Location	Notes
Win	21–14–1	Brandon Gaines	Submission (kimura)	KOTC: Aerial Assault	June 30, 2012	1	1:31	Thackerville, Oklahoma, United States	
Win	20–14–1	Marvin Babe	Submission (armbar)	KOTC: Bad Intentions 2	April 11, 2012	1	0:33	Thackerville, Oklahoma, United States	Return to Middleweight.
Loss	19–14–1	Quinn Mulhern	Submission (omoplata)	KOTC: Militia	June 11, 2009	1	2:01	Highland, California, United States	
Loss	19–13–1	Jean Silva	KO (punches)	Cage Rage 23	September 22, 2007	2	2:26	London, England	
Win	19–12–1	Adam DiSabato	Submission (toe hold)	GFC: Evolution	May 19, 2007	1	2:11	Columbus, Ohio, United States	
Loss	18–12–1	Tatsuya Kawajiri	TKO (strikes)	PRIDE Bushido 12	August 26, 2006	1	0:29	Nagoya, Japan	Lightweight bout.
Loss	18–11–1	Vítor Ribeiro	Submission (swollen eye)	GFC: Team Gracie vs Team Hammer House	March 3, 2006	2	3:25	Columbus, Ohio, United States	
Win	18–10–1	Shannon Ritch	Submission (guillotine choke)	RM 7: Championship Night	December 11, 2005	1	1:19	Tijuana, Mexico	
Win	17–10–1	Mark Moreno	Submission (armbar)	Extreme Wars - X-1	July 2, 2005	1	1:14	Honolulu, Hawaii, United States	
Loss	16–10–1	Daiju Takase	Decision (unanimous)	PRIDE Bushido 2	February 15, 2004	2	5:00	Yokohama, Japan	Middleweight bout.
Win	16–9–1	Eiji Mitsuoka	Submission (kimura)	PRIDE Bushido 1	October 5, 2003	1	4:31	Saitama, Japan	Heavyweight bout.
Win	15–9–1	Jason St. Louis	Submission (armbar)	Adrenaline Fighting Championships 1	July 24, 2003	1	4:20	Langley, British Columbia, Canada	
Loss	14–9–1	Rob Emerson	Submission (achilles lock)	Hitman Fighting 3	May 2, 2003	N/A	N/A	Santa Ana, California, United States	
Loss	14–8–1	Takaharu Murahama	Submission (achilles lock)	Shooto: 1/24 in Korakuen Hall	January 24, 2003	1	2:49	Tokyo, Japan	
Loss	14–7–1	Takanori Gomi	Decision (unanimous)	Shooto: Treasure Hunt 10	September 16, 2002	3	5:00	Yokohama, Japan	
Win	14–6–1	Shannon Ritch	Submission (armbar)	Aztec Challenge 1	September 6, 2002	1	4:50	Juárez, Mexico	
Loss	13–6–1	John Alessio	TKO (punches)	KOTC 15: Bad Intentions	June 22, 2002	1	2:20	San Jacinto, California, United States	
Win	13–5–1	Thomas Denny	Submission (armbar)	Gladiator Challenge 11	April 20, 2002	1	3:12	San Jacinto, California, United States	
Win	12–5–1	John Chrisostomo	Submission (keylock)	Warriors Quest 4: Genesis	March 29, 2002	1	4:10	Honolulu, Hawaii, United States	
Loss	11–5–1	Gil Castillo	Decision (unanimous)	UFC 35	January 11, 2002	3	5:00	Uncasville, Connecticut, United States	
Win	11–4–1	Steve Berger	Decision (unanimous)	KOTC 11: Domination	September 29, 2001	3	5:00	San Jacinto, California, United States	Defended the KOTC Middleweight Championship.
Win	10–4–1	Kevin Hogan	Submission (armbar)	KOTC 10: Critical Mass	August 4, 2001	2	1:08	San Jacinto, California, United States	Won the inaugural KOTC Middleweight Championship.
Win	9–4–1	Robert Wynne	Submission (armbar)	Reality Submission Fighting 1	October 6, 2000	1	1:05	Belleville, Illinois, United States	
Loss	8–4–1	Joe Hurley	KO (elbows)	KOTC 5: Cage Wars	September 16, 2000	1	4:30	San Jacinto, California, United States	Lost the KOTC Middleweight Superfight Championship.
Win	8–3–1	Antonio McKee	KO (head kick)	KOTC 3: Knockout Nightmare	April 15, 2000	2	0:09	San Jacinto, California, United States	Defended the KOTC Middleweight Superfight Championship.
Win	7–3–1	Joe Stevenson	Submission (triangle choke)	KOTC 1: Bas Rutten's King of the Cage	October 30, 1999	1	2:04	San Jacinto, California, United States	Won the inaugural KOTC Middleweight Superfight Championship.
Loss	6–3–1	Steve Gomm	Submission (knees)	Bas Rutten Invitational 3	June 1, 1999	1	2:27	Denver, Colorado, United States	
Win	6–2–1	Steve Horton	Submission (guillotine choke)	Extreme Challenge 22	November 21, 1998	1	2:13	West Valley City, Utah, United States	
Loss	5–2–1	Pat Miletich	Submission (shoulder choke)	UFC 16	March 13, 1998	1	9:02	New Orleans, Louisiana, United States	UFC 16 Welterweight Tournament Finals.
Win	5–1–1	Courtney Turner	Submission (armbar)	UFC 16	March 13, 1998	1	1:20	New Orleans, Louisiana, United States	UFC 16 Welterweight Tournament Reserve Bout.
Loss	4–1–1	Pat Miletich	Decision (unanimous)	Extreme Challenge Trials	November 15, 1997	1	30:00	Davenport, Iowa, United States	
Draw	4–0–1	Pat Miletich	Draw	Extreme Challenge 9	August 30, 1997	1	20:00	Davenport, Iowa, United States	
Win	4–0	Delcio Delcio	Submission (guillotine choke)	Carioca de Freestyle	February 10, 1996	1	4:46	Brazil	
Win	3–0	Steve Oliver	Submission (rear-naked choke)	Independent Event	January 24, 1996	1	1:52	Mississippi, United States	
Win	2–0	Randal Kemp	Submission (armbar)	Independent Event	January 24, 1996	1	1:35	Mississippi, United States	
Win	1–0	Scott Carter	Submission (Peruvian necktie)	Independent Event	January 5, 1996	1	2:12	California, United States	
