= 2000 in King of the Cage =

Mixed martial arts events

Information
- First date: February 5, 2000
- Last date: November 29, 2000

Events
- Total events: 5

Fights
- Total fights: 61
- Title fights: 8

Chronology
| 1999 in KotC | 2000 in King of the Cage | 2001 in KotC |

The year 2000 is the second year in the history of King of the Cage, a mixed martial arts promotion based in The United States. In 2000 King of the Cage held 5 events, beginning with Desert Storm.

== Title fights ==
Title fights in 2000
| Weight class | | | | Method | Round | Time | Event | Notes |
|---|---|---|---|---|---|---|---|---|
| Welterweight | Charlie Kohler | vs. | Erik Meaders (c) | Draw | 2 | 5:00 | KOTC 2: Desert Storm | (Note: For The King of the Cage Welterweight Championship.) |
| Bantamweight | David Step | def. | Jeff Cahill | Submission (Triangle Choke) | 1 | 1:39 | KOTC 2: Desert Storm | (Note: For The King of the Cage Bantamweight Championship.) |
| Openweight | John Matua | def. | Steve Treadwell (c) | Submission (Punches) | 1 | 2:38 | KOTC 2: Desert Storm | (Note: For The King of the Cage Openweight Championship.) |
| Super Heavyweight | Marvin Eastman | def. | Quinton Jackson | Decision (Unanimous) | 2 | 5:00 | KOTC 4: Gladiators | (Note: For The King of the Cage Super Heavyweight Championship.) |
| Lightweight | Charlie Kohler | def. | Jason Meaders | Decision (Unanimous) | 2 | 5:00 | KOTC 4: Gladiators | (Note: For The King of the Cage Lightweight Championship.) |
| Super Heavyweight | Marvin Eastman (c) | def. | Ioka Tianuu | Submission (Punches) | 1 | 3:32 | KOTC 5: Cage Wars | (Note: For The King of the Cage Super Heavyweight Championship.) |
| Openweight | Mike Bourke | def. | John Matua (c) | TKO (Corner Stoppage) | 1 | 5:00 | KOTC 5: Cage Wars | (Note: For The King of the Cage Openweight Championship.) |
| Welterweight | Joe Stevenson | def. | Erik Meaders (c) | Decision (Unanimous) | 3 | 5:00 | KOTC 6: Road Warriors | (Note: For The King of the Cage Welterweight Championship.) |

== Events list ==
| # | Event title | Date | Arena | Location |
|---|---|---|---|---|
| 6 | KOTC 6: Road Warriors | November 29, 2000 | Soaring Eagle Casino | Mount Pleasant, Michigan |
| 5 | KOTC 5: Cage Wars | September 16, 2000 | Soboba Casino | San Jacinto, California |
| 4 | KOTC 4: Gladiators | June 24, 2000 | Soboba Casino | San Jacinto, California |
| 3 | KOTC 3: Knockout Nightmare | April 15, 2000 | Soboba Casino | San Jacinto, California |
| 2 | KOTC 2: Desert Storm | February 5, 2000 | Soboba Casino | San Jacinto, California |

== KOTC 2: Desert Storm ==
KOTC 2: Desert Storm was an event held on February 5, 2000, at The Soboba Casino in San Jacinto, California, United States.

=== Results ===
Main Card
| Weight class | | | | Method | Round | Time | Notes |
|---|---|---|---|---|---|---|---|
| | Ricco Rodriguez | def. | Travis Fulton | Submission (Armbar) | 1 | 4:49 |
| | David Dodd | def. | John Jensen | Submission (Kneebar) | 1 | 0:58 |
| Openweight | John Matua | def. | Steve Treadwell (c) | Submission (Punches) | 1 | 2:38 | (Note: For The King of the Cage Openweight Championship.) |
| | Romie Aram | def. | Brian Foster | Decision (Unanimous) | 2 | 5:00 |
| Welterweight | Charlie Kohler | vs. | Erik Meaders (c) | Draw | 2 | 5:00 | (Note: For The King of the Cage Welterweight Championship.) |
| | Tiki Ghosn | def. | Jason Maxwell | Decision (Unanimous) | 2 | 5:00 |
| | Roger Godinez | def. | Bill Parker | Submission (Fatigue) | 1 | 3:08 |
| | Rick Kerns | vs. | Mike Grimace | Draw | 2 | 5:00 |
| | Nick LaQuette | def. | Alex Richard | Submission (Punches) | 2 | 1:42 |
| | Randy Velarde | def. | Tim Conrad | KO (Punches) | 1 | 0:08 |
| | Brian Warren | def. | Oscar Oscar | TKO (Punches) | 1 | 2:53 |
| | Duane Ludwig | def. | David Ibarra | KO (Head Kick) | 1 | 4:14 |
| Bantamweight | David Step | def. | Jeff Cahill | Submission (Triangle Choke) | 1 | 1:39 | (Note: For The King of the Cage Bantamweight Championship.) |

== KOTC 3: Knockout Nightmare ==
KOTC 3: Knockout Nightmare was an event held on April 15, 2000, at The Soboba Casino in San Jacinto, California, United States.

=== Results ===
Main Card
| Weight class | | | | Method | Round | Time | Notes |
|---|---|---|---|---|---|---|---|
| | Vernon White | def. | Todd Medina | KO (Punch) | 1 | 0:09 |
| | Chris Brennan | def. | Antonio McKee | KO (Head Kick) | 2 | 0:09 |
| | Mike Bourke | def. | Steve Treadwell | TKO (Corner Stoppage) | 1 | 1:46 |
| | Kelly Dullanty | def. | Shad Smith | TKO (Punches) | 1 | 1:58 |
| | Javier Vazquez | def. | Antonio Emay | Submission (Injury) | 1 | 2:44 |
| | Rick Kerns | def. | Will Ascencio | Submission (Triangle Choke) | 1 | 1:34 |
| | Sean Sullivan | def. | Curtis McWatters | Submission (Heel Hook) | 1 | 1:33 |
| | Jim Abrille | def. | Tim Conrad | Submission (Heel Hook) | 1 | 0:37 |
| | Joe Stevenson | def. | Toby Imada | Decision | 2 | 5:00 |
| | Duane Ludwig | def. | Jason Maxwell | Decision (Unanimous) | 2 | 5:00 |
| | David Step | def. | Armando Sanchez | Submission (Armbar) | 1 | 1:32 |
| | Matt Barrazza | def. | Jeff Cahill | Submission (Rear-Naked Choke) | 1 | 2:01 |

== KOTC 4: Gladiators ==
KOTC 4: Gladiators was an event held on June 24, 2000, at The Soboba Casino in San Jacinto, California, United States.

=== Results ===
Main Card
| Weight class | | | | Method | Round | Time | Notes |
|---|---|---|---|---|---|---|---|
| | Todd Medina | def. | Daijiro Matsui | Decision (Unanimous) | 2 | 5:00 |
| | Tedd Williams | def. | Bill Parker | Submission (Keylock) | 1 | 0:32 |
| | Fabiano Iha | def. | Danny Bennett | Submission (Armbar) | 1 | 0:49 |
| | Roger Neff | def. | Chris Franco | Submission (Punches) | 1 | 1:59 |
| | Jacen Flynn | def. | Ryan Painter | Submission (Kimura) | 1 | 2:34 |
| | Tony Galindo | def. | Kurt Rojo | KO (Punch) | 1 | 0:07 |
| | Falaniko Vitale | def. | Aaron Torres | Submission (Armbar) | 1 | 2:21 |
| | Dan Rizzuto | def. | Dustin Moe | Decision (Unanimous) | 2 | 5:00 |
| | Duane Ludwig | def. | Shad Smith | TKO (Corner Stoppage) | 1 | 3:08 |
| | David Roberts | def. | Pete Rossi | TKO (Punches) | 1 | 1:28 |
| Super Heavyweight | Marvin Eastman | def. | Quinton Jackson | Decision (Unanimous) | 2 | 5:00 | (Note: For The King of the Cage Super Heavyweight Championship.) |
| Lightweight | Charlie Kohler | def. | Jason Meaders | Decision (Unanimous) | 2 | 5:00 | (Note: For The King of the Cage Lightweight Championship.) |
| | David Velasquez | def. | Dave Hisquierdo | Decision (Unanimous) | 2 | 5:00 |
| | Roger Godinez | vs. | Mike Bourke | Draw | 2 | 5:00 |
| | Jeremy Williams | def. | Brennan Kamaka | Submission (Armbar) | 1 | 0:58 |

== KOTC 5: Cage Wars ==
KOTC 5: Cage Wars was an event held on September 16, 2000, at The Soboba Casino in San Jacinto, California, United States.

=== Results ===
Main Card
| Weight class | | | | Method | Round | Time | Notes |
|---|---|---|---|---|---|---|---|
| | Joe Hurley | def. | Chris Brennan | KO (Elbows) | 1 | 4:22 |
| | Jerry Bohlander | def. | Brian Foster | Submission (Armbar) | 2 | 1:04 |
| | Amir Rahnavardi | def. | Daijiro Matsui | Decision (Unanimous) | 3 | 5:00 |
| Openweight | Mike Bourke | def. | John Matua (c) | TKO (Corner Stoppage) | 1 | 5:00 | (Note: For The King of the Cage Openweight Championship.) |
| Super Heavyweight | Marvin Eastman (c) | def. | Ioka Tianuu | Submission (Punches) | 1 | 3:32 | (Note: For The King of the Cage Super Heavyweight Championship.) |
| | Mark Smith | def. | Jay Martinez | Decision (Unanimous) | 2 | 5:00 |
| | Jason Brudvik | def. | Aaron Anderson | Submission (Triangle Choke) | 0 | N/A |
| | Romie Aram | def. | Scott Goddard | TKO (Punches) | 2 | 2:41 |
| | Yves Edwards | def. | Danny Bennett | Submission (Rear-Naked Choke) | 1 | 3:02 |
| | Dean Lister | def. | John Jensen | Submission (Kneebar) | 1 | 1:48 |
| | Trevor Lally | def. | Kenneth Tenorio | Submission (Rear-Naked Choke) | 1 | 4:10 |

== KOTC 6: Road Warriors ==
KOTC 6: Road Warriors was an event held on November 29, 2000, at The Soaring Eagle Casino in Mount Pleasant, Michigan, United States.

=== Results ===
Main Card
| Weight class | | | | Method | Round | Time | Notes |
|---|---|---|---|---|---|---|---|
| | Pete Williams | def. | Roger Neff | KO (Punch) | 1 | 0:06 |
| | Vernon White | def. | David Folta | KO (Flying Knee) | 2 | 3:43 |
| | Kelly Dullanty | def. | Duane Ludwig | Decision (Unanimous) | 3 | 5:00 |
| Welterweight | Joe Stevenson | def. | Erik Meaders (c) | Decision (Unanimous) | 3 | 5:00 | (Note: For The King of the Cage Welterweight Championship.) |
| | Tony Galindo | def. | Brian Hawkins | TKO (Punches) | 1 | 1:30 |
| | Betiss Mansouri | def. | Adrian Serrano | Submission (Guillotine Choke) | 2 | 0:22 |
| | Jason Buck | def. | Jason Ireland | Decision (Unanimous) | 3 | 5:00 |
| | Dave Knaggs | def. | Mike Lee | Decision (Unanimous) | 3 | 5:00 |
| | Jerry Jenkins | def. | Christopher Khon | Submission (Rear Naked Choke) | 1 | 1:55 |
| | Quinton Jackson | def. | Rob Smith | Decision (Unanimous) | 3 | 5:00 |

== See also ==
- King of the Cage
- List of King of the Cage events
- List of King of the Cage champions
