= Kelly Dullanty =

American mixed martial artist

- Born: Kelly James Dullanty; July 4, 1977 (age 49); San Jose, California, United States
- Other names: Psycho
- Height: 5 ft 8 in (1.73 m)
- Weight: 155 lb (70 kg; 11.1 st)
- Division: Featherweight (2008) Lightweight (2000–2002)
- Team: Shamrock Submission Fighting Team
- Years active: 2000–2008

Mixed martial arts record
- Total: 6
- Wins: 4
- By knockout: 2
- By decision: 2
- Losses: 2
- By knockout: 1
- By submission: 1

Other information
- Mixed martial arts record from Sherdog

Kelly James Dullanty (born July 4, 1977) is a retired American mixed martial artist who is probably best known for competing in the Ultimate Fighting Championship. Dullanty competed in both Featherweight and Lightweight divisions.

== Mixed martial arts record ==
Professional record breakdown
6 matches	4 wins	2 losses
By knockout	2	1
By submission	0	1
By decision	2	0

Res.	Record	Opponent	Method	Event	Date	Round	Time	Location	Notes
Loss	4–2	Lance Wipf	KO (punch)	PureCombat - Bring the Pain	May 9, 2008	1	0:09	California, United States	
Loss	4–1	Matt Serra	Submission (triangle choke)	UFC 36	March 22, 2002	1	2:58	Nevada, United States	
Win	4–0	Rudy Vallederas	TKO (corner stoppage)	IFC WC 13 - Warriors Challenge 13	June 15, 2001	1	N/A	California, United States	Won the IFC Warriors Challenge Lightweight tournament.
Win	3–0	Nuri Shakir	Decision (unanimous)	IFC WC 13 - Warriors Challenge 13	June 15, 2001	3	5:00	California, United States	IFC Warriors Challenge Lightweight tournament semifinal.
Win	2–0	Duane Ludwig	Decision (unanimous)	KOTC 6 - Road Warriors	November 29, 2000	3	5:00	Michigan, United States	
Win	1–0	Shad Smith	TKO (strikes)	KOTC 3 - Knockout Nightmare	April 15, 2000	1	1:58	California, United States	
