= UFC 16 =

UFC mixed martial arts event in 1998

UFC 16: Battle in the Bayou
- The poster for UFC 16: Battle in the Bayou
- Promotion: Ultimate Fighting Championship
- Date: March 13, 1998
- Venue: Pontchartrain Center
- City: Kenner, Louisiana
- Attendance: 4,600

Event chronology
UFC Japan: Ultimate Japan	UFC 16: Battle in the Bayou	UFC 17: Redemption

UFC 16: Battle in the Bayou was a mixed martial arts event held by the Ultimate Fighting Championship on March 13, 1998, in Kenner, Louisiana. The event was seen live on pay per view in the United States, and later released on home video.

== History ==
UFC 16 featured the first ever UFC Welterweight tournament in the USA (for fighters under 170 lb), as well as a Light Heavyweight Championship bout, a Heavyweight and a Light Heavyweight Superfight, and two alternate bouts in case of tournament injury.

UFC 16 marked the first appearance of the influential fighter Pat Miletich, who would go on to create Miletich Fighting Systems. Tank Abbott was a guest commentator for the Heavyweight Superfight.

The UFC Light Heavyweight Championship bout, was billed to be champion Frank Shamrock's biggest test, in Battlecade star, Igor Zinoviev. This would end up being the final match of Zinoviev's career, as he suffered a career-ending collarbone injury from Shamrock's victorious KO slam.

Kimo Leopoldo returned to the UFC at UFC 16 and fought top Japanese fighter Tsuyoshi Kohsaka. Kimo dominated the first portion of the fight but began to fatigue and eventually lost the fight by decision.

== Results ==
UFC Light Heavyweight Championship
Weight class				Method	Round	Time	Notes
Light Heavyweight	Frank Shamrock (c)	def.	Igor Zinoviev	KO (slam)		0:22	(Note: For the UFC Light Heavyweight Championship.)
Heavyweight bout
Heavyweight	Tsuyoshi Kohsaka	def.	Kimo Leopoldo	Decision (unanimous)		15:00
Light Heavyweight bout
Light Heavyweight	Jerry Bohlander	def.	Kevin Jackson	Technical submission (armbar)		10:23	(Note: Jackson refused to tap, referee John McCarthy stopped the fight.)
Welterweight Tournament Finals
Welterweight	Pat Miletich	def.	Chris Brennan	Submission (shoulder choke)		9:02	(Note: Mikey Burnett withdrew from the tournament due to a broken finger and was replaced by Brennan.)
Welterweight Tournament Semifinals
Welterweight	Mikey Burnett	def.	Eugenio Tadeu	TKO (punches)		9:46	(Note: Burnett had to withdraw from the tournament due to a broken finger suffered during this bout.)
Welterweight	Pat Miletich	def.	Townsend Saunders	Decision (split)		15:00
Welterweight Tournament Alternate bouts
Welterweight	LaVerne Clark	def.	Josh Stuart	TKO (punches)		1:15
Welterweight	Chris Brennan	def.	Courtney Turner	Submission (armbar)		1:20

== UFC 16 Lightweight Tournament Bracket ==
Semifinals
Mikey Burnett	TKO
Eugenio Tadeu	9:46
Pat Miletich	DEC
Townsend Saunders	15:00

Finals
Pat Miletich	SUB
Chris Brennan^{1}	9:02

^{1} Mikey Burnett withdrew from the tournament due to a broken finger and was replaced by Chris Brennan.

== Encyclopedia awards ==
The following fighters were honored in the October 2011 book titled UFC Encyclopedia.

- Fight of the Night: Tsuyoshi Kohsaka vs. Kimo Leopoldo
- Knockout of the Night: Frank Shamrock def. Igor Zinoviev
- Submission of the Night: Jerry Bohlander def. Kevin Jackson

== See also ==
- Ultimate Fighting Championship
- List of UFC champions
- List of UFC events
- 1998 in UFC
