= List of King of the Cage champions =

This is a list of King of the Cage (KOTC) champions at each weight class. KOTC is a USA-based mixed martial arts (MMA) organization that was founded in 1998.

The weight division system of KOTC is divided up in accordance with the Unified Rules of Mixed Martial Arts, but with some variations. KOTC has chosen to name its 145-pound division "Bantamweight" (instead of Featherweight), its 135-pound division "Flyweight" (instead of Bantamweight) and its 125-pound division "Light Flyweight" (instead of Flyweight). KOTC also takes advantage of the rarely used Super Heavyweight division for fighters exceeding the 265-pound weight limit of the Heavyweight division.

In addition to these variances, KOTC also employs three exclusive weight classes that were not specified within the Unified Rules of Mixed Martial Arts (until July 2017): a 165-pound "Light Welterweight" division, a 230-pound "Cruiserweight" division, and a 195-pound "Super Middleweight"' division. These divisions were later introduced (amongst others) into the Unified Rules of MMA, with "Light Welterweight" being called "Super Lightweight".

== Current champions ==
Men
Division	Champion	Since	Defenses
Super Heavyweight	(Brazil) Ronny Markes	Feb 4, 2017	0
Heavyweight	(United States) Jordan Currie	October 10, 2024	0
Cruiserweight	(United States) Victor Torres	April 13, 2019	0
Light Heavyweight	(United States) Fernando Alvarado	October 25, 2025	0
Super Middleweight	(United States) Erik Herbert	February 17, 2018	0
Middleweight	(United States) EL J Portée	February 10, 2024	0
Welterweight	(United States) Cameron Robinett	October 10, 2024	1
Light Welterweight	(United States) Richie Palomino	September 7, 2019	0
Lightweight	(United States) Dennis Linton	November 2, 2024	0
Bantamweight	(United States) Dennis Linton	February 10, 2024	2
Flyweight	(United States) Johnny Muñoz Jr.	June 22, 2019	0
Light Flyweight	(United States) Reuben Duran	Feb. 24, 2018	0
CANADIAN Middleweight	(Canada) Elmer Waterhen	March 4, 2016	0
CANADIAN Welterweight	(Canada) Jarid Bussemakers	March 3, 2017	0
CANADIAN Bantamweight	(Canada) Josh Machan	April 28, 2012	1

Women
Division	Champion	Since	Defenses
Flyweight	(United States) Shanna Young	November 21, 2015	0
Flyweight (Interim)	(United States) Pam Sorenson	July 30, 2016	1
Light Flyweight	(United States) Glena Avila	May 26, 2018	0
Strawweight	(United States) Cynthia Arceo	Feb. 24, 2018	0
Atomweight	(United States) Jayme Hinshaw	November 10, 2017	1

== Title history ==
=== Super Heavyweight Championship ===
Over 265 pounds (120.2 kg)

Prior to 2002 this weight class was referred to as Heavyweight.

No.	Name:	Date:	Location:	Defenses:
1	(United States) Marvin Eastman def.Quinton Jackson	June 24, 2000; KOTC 4: Gladiators	San Jacinto, CA, USA	1. def. Ioka Tianuu on Sep 16, 2000 at KOTC 5: Cage Wars
Eastman vacated the title to compete at Light Heavyweight.
2	(United States) Bobby Hoffman def. Kauai Kupihea	June 23, 2001; KOTC 9: Showtime	San Jacinto, CA, USA	
Hoffman was stripped of the title after leaving the promotion.
3	(United States) Dan Bobish def.Eric Pele	February 9, 2002; KOTC 12: Cold Blood	San Jacinto, CA, USA	1. def. Mike Kyle on May 17, 2002 at KOTC 13: Revolution
4	(United States) Barry Pardue	August 2, 2002; KOTC 16: Double Cross	New Orleans, LA , USA	1. def. Vince Lucero on Dec 7, 2002 at KOTC 19: Street Fight; {{small|2. def. Jonathan Ivey on Feb 21, 2003 at KOTC
(United States) Eric Pele def. Dan Christison	May 16, 2003; KOTC 23: Sin City	Las Vegas, NV, USA	1. def. Travis Fulton on Jan 24, 2004 at KOTC 32: Bringing the Heat	
Pele was stripped of the title for leaving the promotion.
6	(United States) Lloyd Marshbanks def. Jerry Vrbanovic	November 14, 2004; KOTC: Revenge	San Jacinto, CA, USA	
Marshbanks was stripped of the title after leaving the promotion.
7	(United States) Eric Pele (2) def. Bobby Hoffman	May 7, 2005; KOTC: Mortal Sins	Primm, NV, USA	
Pele was stripped of the title due to inactivity.
8	(United States) Brian Sesma def. Alan Zummar	December 2, 2007; KOTC: Final Chapter	San Jacinto, CA, USA	
Sesma was stripped of the title for never accepting a title defence.
Chance Williams and Mike Bourke fought to a no contest for the vacant title on May 15, 2008 at KOTC: Opposing Forces.
Chance Williams was awarded the title after Mike Bourke refused to face Williams in a rematch.
9	(United States) Chance Williams promoted to undisputed champion	December 11, 2008; KOTC: Prowler	Highland, CA, USA	
10	(United States) Neil Cooke	February 27, 2009; KOTC: Immortal	San Bernardino, CA, USA	1. def. Sal Farnetti on Aug 13, 2009 at KOTC: Super Stars; 2. def. Mike Guidry on Jul 10, 2010 at KOTC: Tropical Storm
11	(United States) Esteves Jones	February 3, 2011; KOTC: Empire	San Bernardino, CA, USA	
12	(United States) Tony Lopez	September 17, 2011; KOTC: Apocalypse	Thackerville, OK, USA	1. def. Rob Jackson on Feb 2, 2012 at KOTC: Reckless Abandon
13	(Brazil) Ronny Markes	Feb 4, 2017; KOTC: Heavy Trauma	Lincoln City, OR, USA	

=== Heavyweight Championship ===
231 pounds (104.8 kg) to 265 pounds (120.2 kg)

In 2002 the Heavyweight and its title history were reclassified as Super Heavyweight and a new Heavyweight title was created with its current weight limit.

No.	Name	Date	Location	Defenses
1	(United States) Bobby Hoffman def. Jason Godsey	February 21, 2003; KOTC 21: Invasion	Albuquerque, NM, USA	1. def. Paul Buentello on Aug 10, 2003 at KOTC 27: Aftermath
2	(United States) Paul Buentello	November 2, 2003; KOTC 30: The Pinnacle	Pala, CA, USA	1. def. Bo Cantrell on Nov 14, 2004 at KOTC: Revenge
Buentello vacated the title to compete in the UFC.
3	(United States) Manny Rodriguez def. Jerry Davis	March 10, 2007; KOTC: Caged Chaos	Laughlin, NV, USA	
Rodriguez vacated the title after he was forced to retire due to injuries.
4	(United States) Tony Lopez def. Wes Combs	July 19, 2008; KOTC: Rock Solid	Lac Du Flambeau, WI, USA	1. def. Joey Beltran on Oct 1, 2009 at KOTC: Distorted; 2. def. Tyler East on Dec 17, 2009 at KOTC: Fight 4 Hope; 3. def. Tyler East on Feb 12, 2010 at KOTC: Vengeance
5	(United States) Tony Johnson	March 26, 2010; KOTC: Legacy	Reno, NV, USA	
6	(United States) Daniel Cormier	August 13, 2010; KOTC: Imminent Danger	Mescalero, NM, USA	
Cormier vacated the title to fight for Strikeforce.
7	(United States) Tyler East def. Nick Gaston	June 24, 2011; KOTC: Epic Force	Thackerville, OK, USA	
East was stripped of the title.
8	(United States) Tony Lopez (2) def. Esteves Jones	December 15, 2011; KOTC: Magnaflow	San Bernardino, CA, USA	1. def. Cody East on Apr 14, 2012 at KOTC: Bad Intentions II; 2. def. Jason Walaven on Apr 26, 2012 at KOTC: Hardcore; 3. def. Nick Rossborough on Oct 25, 2012 at KOTC: Gun Show
9	(United States) Nick Rossborough	April 11, 2013; KOTC: Devastation	Highland, CA, USA	
10	(United States) Cody East	June 22, 2013; KOTC: East vs. West	Albuquerque, NM, USA	
East was stripped of the title when he signed with Legacy FC.
11	(United States) Tony Lopez (3) def. Anthony McDonald	Sept 5, 2015; KOTC: Rogue Wave	Lincoln City, OR, USA	1. def. Nathan Bryant on May 21, 2016 at KOTC: Blood Enemies; 2. def. Andenilson Clementino on Dec. 9, 2016 at KOTC: Declaring War; 3. def. Josh Parisian on Apr. 29, 2017 at KOTC: Supremacy; 4. def. Jordan Currie on Aug. 17, 2017 at KOTC: Next In Line; 5. def. Fabiano Scherner on Feb. 3, 2018 at KOTC: Fight to the Finish
Lopez was stripped of the title when he signed with Rage in the Cage.
12	(United States) Chad Johnson def. Edward Sponeybarger	Nov. 10, 2018; KOTC: In The Mix	Salamanca, NY, USA	
13	(United States) Tomar Washington	May 11, 2019; KOTC: Rumble on the River 2	North Augusta, SC, USA	
14	(United States) Jordan Currie def. Tomar Washington	October 10, 2024; KOTC: Havoc	Worley, ID, USA	

=== Cruiserweight Championship ===
206 pounds (93.4 kg) to 230 pounds (104.3 kg)

No.	Name:	Date:	Location:	Defenses:
1	(Australia) Tony Bonello def. Mike Bourke	February 12, 2010; KOTC: Vengeance	Mescalero, NM, USA	
Bonello was stripped of the title after leaving the promotion.
2	(United States) Wes Combs def. Boban Simic	July 23, 2011; KOTC: Compression Test	Lac du Flambeau, WI, USA	1. def. Esteves Jones on May 25, 2013 at KOTC: World Championships
Combs was stripped of the title due to inactivity.
3	(United States) Chad Johnson def. Victor Jones	July 28, 2018; KOTC: Hard Knocks 3	Wyandotte, MI, USA	
Johnson vacated the title to pursue the Heavyweight Championship.
4	(United States) Thomas Fallon def. Alejandro Santiago	October 6, 2018; KOTC: Terminal Velocity	Oroville, CA, USA	
Fallon was stripped of the title when he signed with PureCombat.
5	(United States) Victor Torres def. Jordan Seufzer	April 13, 2019; KOTC: Supremacy 2	Wyandotte, MI, USA	

=== Light Heavyweight Championship ===
196 pounds (88.9 kg) to 205 pounds (93.0 kg)

No.	Name:	Date:	Location:	Defenses:
1	(United States) Vernon White def. Marvin Eastman	April 29, 2001; KOTC 8: Bombs Away	Williams, CA, USA	1. def. James Lee on Sep 29, 2001 at KOTC 11: Domination; 2. def. Mike Rogers on Aug 2, 2002 at KOTC 16: Double Cross
2	(United States) Jeremy Horn	May 16, 2003; KOTC 23: Sin City	Las Vegas, NV, USA	1. def. Dean Lister on Dec 6, 2003 at KOTC 31
Horn was stripped of the title after leaving the promotion.
3	(Australia) Tony Bonello def. Edwin Aguilar	February 4, 2005; KOTC: Australia	Australia	
Bonello was stripped of the title after leaving the promotion.
4	(United States) James Lee def. James Te Huna	February 10, 2006; KOTC: Gunfather	Australia	1. def. Brian Hawkins on Mar 18, 2006 at KOTC: Drop Zone; 2. def. Aungla Nsang on Jun 15, 2007 at KOTC: Explosion; 3. def. Danny Bessant on Nov 21, 2007 at KOTC: Bad Boys
Lee vacated the title on November 21, 2007 to fight for the UFC.
5	(United States) Tony Lopez def. Fernando Gonzalez	October 16, 2008; KOTC: Misconduct	Highland, CA, USA	1. def. Keith Berry on Feb 27, 2009 at KOTC: Immortal; 2. def. Fernando Gonzalez on May 16, 2009 at KOTC: Storm; 3. def. Chad Herrick on Jun 19, 2009 at KOTC: Encore; 4. def. Dave Cryer on Aug 13, 2009 at KOTC: Super Stars
6	(United States) Mike Kyle	May 14, 2010; KOTC: Honor	Mescalero, NM, USA	
Kyle vacated the title to fight for Strikeforce.
7	(South Africa) Trevor Prangley def. Tony Lopez	December 20, 2012; KOTC: Vigilante	Highland, CA, USA	1. def. Brandon Anderson on Feb 22, 2013 at KOTC: Free Fall II; 2. def. Dan Molina on Apr 13, 2013 at KOTC: Fighting Legends; 3. def. Tony Lopez on Jun 13, 2013 at KOTC: It's Personal; 4. def. Jared Torgeson on Oct 14, 2013 at KOTC: Double Impact; 5. def. Jared Torgeson on Aug 14, 2014 at KOTC: Steadfast; 6. def. Richard Blake on Nov 13, 2014 at KOTC: Tactical Strike
Prangley was stripped of the title after failing to make a title defense.
8	(United States) Tony Lopez (2) def. Mike Hayes	August 6, 2016; KOTC: Provoked	Lincoln City, OR, USA	
Lopez vacated the title to concentrate on the Heavyweight division.
9	(United States) Jason Butcher def. William Hill	March 3, 2017; KOTC: Violent Confrontation	Carlton, MN, USA	1. def. Jesse Murray on Oct. 28, 2017 at KOTC: Locked In
Butcher was stripped of the title when he signed with PFL.
10	(United States) Jesse Murray def. Victor Jones	April 13, 2019; KOTC: Supremacy 2	Wyandotte, MI, USA	
11	(United States) Fernando Alvarado def. Giovanni Sarran	November 2, 2024; KOTC: Clash of Champions	Lincoln City, OR, USA	
12	(United States) Giovanni Sarran def. Brandon Nunn	February 8, 2025; KOTC: Super Brawl	Lincoln City, OR, USA	
13	(United States) Fernando Alvarado (2) def. Giovanni Sarran	October 25, 2025; KOTC: Strike Zone	Lincoln City, OR, USA	

=== Super Middleweight Championship ===
186 pounds (84.4 kg) to 195 pounds (88.5 kg)

No.	Name:	Date:	Location:	Defenses:
1	(United States) Erik Herbert def. Mike DiOrio	February 17, 2018; KOTC Prevail	Niagara Falls, NY, USA	

=== Middleweight Championship ===
176 pounds (79.8 kg) to 185 pounds (83.9 kg)

No.	Name:	Date:	Location:	Defenses:
1	(United States) Chris Brennan def. Kevin Hogan	August 4, 2001; KOTC 10: Critical Mass	San Jacinto, CA, USA	1. def. Steve Berger on Sep 29, 2001 at KOTC 11: Domination; 2. def. John Alessio on Jun 22, 2002 at KOTC 15: Bad Intentions
Brennan was stripped of the title after leaving the promotion.
2	(United States) Dean Lister def. Brendan Seguin	August 2, 2002; KOTC 16: Double Cross	San Jacinto, CA, USA	1. def. Brian Sleeman on Jun 29, 2003 at KOTC 25: Flaming Fury; 2. def. James Lee on Sep 5, 2003 at KOTC 29: Renegades
Lister vacated the title to compete at Light Heavyweight.
3	(United States) Joey Villasenor def. Brian Foster	September 24, 2004; KOTC: Relentless	San Jacinto, CA, USA	1. def. Jorge Ortiz on Dec 4, 2004 at KOTC: Hostile Takeover; 2. def. Brendan Seguin on Feb 25, 2005 at KOTC: Payback; 3. def. Michael Gonzalez on Jun 17, 2005 at KOTC: Grudge Match; 4. def. Damien Riccio on Jun 24, 2005 at KOTC: Warzone; 5. def. Jorge Santiago on Aug 5, 2005 at KOTC: Prime Time; 6. def. Kyacey Uscola on Feb 11, 2006 at KOTC: Anarchy; 7. def. John Cronk on Jul 29, 2006 at KOTC: Civil War
Villasenor was stripped of the title after signing with Pride.
4	(United States) Billy Ayash def. Joshua Taibi	January 26, 2007; KOTC: Mass Destruction	Mt. Pleasant, MI, USA	
Ayash was stripped of the title after leaving the promotion.
5	(United States) Keith Berry def. Sean Loeffler	August 5, 2007; KOTC: Collision Course	San Jacinto, CA, USA	1. def. Umar Love on Dec 2, 2007 at KOTC: Final Chapter
Berry vacated the title to compete at Light Heavyweight.
6	(United States) Brandon Hunt def. Brad Burrick	November 26, 2008; KOTC: Anticipation	Mt. Pleasant, MI, USA	
7	(United States) Brad Burrick	June 19, 2009; KOTC: Encore	Mt. Pleasant, MI, USA	
8	(United States) Brandon Hunt (2)	April 16, 2010; KOTC: Bad Boys 2	Detroit, MI, USA	1. def. Angelo Popofski on Sep 11, 2010 at KOTC: Civil War II; 2. def. Kenny McCorkell on Apr 21, 2011 at KOTC: Moral Victory; 3. def. Angelo Popofski on Sep 24, 2011 at KOTC: Homecoming
9	(United States) Sean Strickland	April 26, 2012; KOTC: Hardcore	Highland, CA, USA	
-	(United States) Josh Bryant def. Shonie Carter for interim title	September 21, 2012; KOTC: Heavy Duty	Tulsa, OK, USA	
-	(United States) Sean Strickland def. Josh Bryant to unify titles	Dec 8, 2012; KOTC: Unification	Tulsa, OK, USA	1. def. Bill Albrecht on Feb 7, 2013 at KOTC: Restitution; 2. def. Yusuke Sakashita on Jul 5, 2013 at KOTC: Worldwide; 3. def. Matt Lagler on Aug 29, 2013 at KOTC: Split Decision
Title was vacated on March 3, 2014 when Strickland left the organization to fight for the UFC.
10	(United States) Daniel Hernandez def. Brandon Hunt	October 2, 2014; KOTC: Battle for the Belt	Highland, CA, USA	1. def. Will Noland on Dec 4, 2014 at KOTC: Fisticuffs; 2. def. Matt Lagler on June 14, 2015 at KOTC: Sanctioned; 3. def. Matt Gabel on August 1, 2015 at KOTC: Rumble on the River
11	(United States) Daniel Madrid	October 17, 2015; KOTC: Sinister Intentions	Las Vegas, NV, USA	1. def. Daniel Hernandez on March 5, 2016 at KOTC: Night of Champions
Madrid was stripped of the title when he failed to make a title defense.
12	(United States) Sidiah Parker def. Matt Gabel	October 8, 2016; KOTC: Social Disorder	Sloan, IA, USA	1. def. Daniel Hernandez on August 12, 2017 at KOTC: Counterstrike
Parker vacated the title when he signed with Legacy Fighting Alliance.
13	(United States) Joe Taylor def. George Clynes	October 9, 2021; KOTC: Legendary	Niagara Falls, NY, USA	
14	(United States) EL J Portée def. Brandon Nunn	February 10, 2024; KOTC: Grudge Match	Lincoln City, OR, USA	

=== Welterweight Championship ===
166 pounds (75.3 kg) to 175 pounds (79.4 kg)

In 2008 KOTC revised this weight limit from 170 lb (77.1 kg) to its current limits.

No.	Name:	Date:	Location:	Defenses:
1	(United States) Erik Meaders def. Jeremy Williams	October 30, 1999; KOTC 1: Bas Rutten's King of the Cage	San Jacinto, CA, USA	1. def. Charlie Kohler on Feb 5, 2000 at KOTC 2: Desert Storm
2	(United States) Joe Stevenson	November 29, 2000; KOTC 6: Road Warriors	Mt. Pleasant, MI, USA	1. def. Ryan Painter on Aug 4, 2001 at KOTC 10: Critical Mass; 2. def. Jerry Gummo on Feb 9, 2002 at KOTC 12: Cold Blood; 3. def. Jeremy Jackson on Jun 22, 2002 at KOTC 15: Bad Intentions
3	(United States) Romie Aram	October 19, 2002; KOTC 17: Nuclear Explosion	San Jacinto, CA, USA	
Aram was stripped of the title after signing with the UFC.
4	(United States) Ronald Jhun def. Shonie Carter	May 16, 2003; KOTC 23: Sin City	Las Vegas, NV, USA	
5	(Canada) John Alessio	September 5, 2003; KOTC 29: Renegades	San Jacinto, CA, USA	
Alessio was stripped of the title after leaving the promotion.
6	(United States) Diego Sanchez def. Jorge Santiago	June 12, 2004; KOTC 37: Unfinished Business	San Jacinto, CA, USA	
Sanchez was stripped of the title after he left to compete on The Ultimate Fighter 1.
7	(United States) James Fanshier def. Thomas Denny	November 14, 2004; KOTC: Revenge	San Jacinto, CA, USA	1. def. Brandon Bell on Feb 4, 2005 at KOTC: Australia
8	(United States) Thomas Denny	December 2, 2005; KOTC: Final Conflict	San Jacinto, CA, USA	
9	(United States) Matt Stansell	March 25, 2006; KOTC: The Return II	San Jacinto, CA, USA	
Stansell vacated the title after retiring from competition.
10	(United States) Aaron Wetherspoon def. Thomas Kenney	August 4, 2006; KOTC: Rapid Fire	San Jacinto, CA, USA	1. def. Dave Terrel on Dec 1, 2006 at KOTC: Destroyer; 2. def. Bryson Kamaka on Mar 10, 2007 at KOTC: Caged Chaos; 3. def. LaVerne Clark on Apr 27, 2007 at KOTC: Sinister; 4. def. John Mahlow on Mar 17, 2008 at KOTC: Tsunami II; 5. No contest vs. Anthony Lapsley on May 15, 2008 at KOTC: Opposing Force
11	(United States) Anthony Lapsley	August 14, 2008; KOTC: Biohazard	Highland, CA, USA	
12	(United States) Michael Guymon	December 11, 2008; KOTC: Prowler	Highland, CA, USA	1. def. Quinn Mulhern on Oct 1, 2009 at KOTC: Distorted
Guymon was stripped of the title after signing with the UFC.
13	(United States) Quinn Mulhern def. Koffi Adzitso	March 26, 2010; KOTC: Legacy	Reno, NV, USA	1. def. Levi Stout on Aug 13, 2010 at KOTC: Imminent Danger; 2. def. Garett Davis on Dec 4, 2010 at KOTC Canada: Black Ops; 3. def. Anselmo Martinez on Apr 16, 2011 at KOTC: Texas
Mulhern vacated the title on May 6, 2011 after signing with Strikeforce.
14	(United States) David Gomez def. Brendan Tierney	June 30, 2011; KOTC: Next Generation	Highland, CA, USA	
15	(United States) Bill Albrecht	September 17, 2011; KOTC: Apocalypse	Thackerville, OK, USA	
16	(United States) Dom O’Grady	January 21, 2012; KOTC: Total Destruction	Thackerville, OK, USA	
O'Grady was stripped of the title after signing with Bellator.
17	(United States) David Gomez (2) def. Matt Conte	April 26, 2012; KOTC: Hardcore	Highland, CA, USA	1. def. Bill Albrecht on Aug 30, 2012 at KOTC: Mercenaries; 2. def. Brad Burrick on Oct 27, 2012 at KOTC: Gun Show
18	(United States) Sam Liera	December 20, 2012; KOTC: Vigilante	Highland, CA, USA	
19	(United States) Joshua Aveles	February 7, 2013; KOTC: Restitution	Highland, CA, USA	
20	(United States) David Gomez (3)	April 11, 2013; KOTC: Devastation	Highland, CA, USA	
21	(United States) Joshua Aveles (2)	August 29, 2013; KOTC: Split Decision	Highland, CA, USA	
22	(United States) Kito Andrews	November 30, 2013; KOTC: Enemy Territory	Oroville, CA, USA	
23	(United States) Joshua Aveles (3)	February 22, 2014; KOTC: Radar Lock	Scottsdale, AZ, USA	
Aveles vacated the title after signing with Tachi Palace Fights.
24	(United States) Ben Egli def. Aaron Hedrick	October 1, 2016; KOTC: High Caliber	Lincoln City, OR, USA	1. def. Ryan Walker on Feb 4, 2017 at KOTC: Heavy Trauma; 2. def. Justin Baesman on May 27, 2017 at KOTC: Head Strong; 3. def. Tyson Jeffries on Aug 5, 2017 at KOTC: Fractured
Egli vacated the title after signing with Absolute Championship Berkut.
-	(United States) Dez Hill def. Anthony Rozema for interim title	April 8, 2017; KOTC: Starbound	Rio Rancho, NM, USA	
Hill vacated the title after signing with Cage Wars.
25	(United States) Edson Gomez def. Travis Williams	June 22, 2019; KOTC: Golden Era	Ontario, CA, USA	1. def. Danny Garcia on Dec. 8, 2019 at KOTC: Hard Drive
26	(United States) Cameron Robinett def. Saad Ul-Hasan	October 10, 2024; KOTC: Havoc	Worley, ID, USA	

=== Light Welterweight Championship ===
156 pounds (70.8 kg) to 165 pounds (74.8 kg)

No.	Name	Date	Location	Defenses
1	(United States) Joe Camacho def. Thomas Denny	January 24, 2008; KOTC: Premiere	Highland, CA, USA	
2	(United States) Victor Valenzuela	August 14, 2008; KOTC: Bio Hazard	Highland, CA, USA	1. def. Donald Sanchez on Feb 27, 2009 at KOTC: Immortal; 2. def. Gabe Rivas on Jun 6, 2009 at KOTC: Legends
Valenzuela vacated the title to compete as a Lightweight.
3	(United States) Ricky Legere Jr. def. Waachiim Spiritwolf	October 1, 2009; KOTC: Distorted	Highland, CA, USA	1. def. Eric Moon on Dec 17, 2009 at KOTC: Fight 4 Hope
4	(United States) Bobby Green	February 25, 2010; KOTC: Arrival	Highland, CA, USA	1. def. Daron Cruickshank on Aug 13, 2010 at KOTC: Imminent Danger
5	(United States) Tim Means	October 7, 2010; KOTC: Inferno	Highland, CA, USA	1. def. Dom O'Grady on Dec 9, 2010 at KOTC: Steel; 2. def. Cris Leyva on May 14, 2011 at KOTC: Fight to Live; 3. def. Cody Pfister on Aug 27, 2011 at KOTC: Kingpin
Means vacated the title in February, 2012 to fight for UFC.
6	(United States) Tony Hervey def. Buddy Clinton	June 30, 2012; KOTC: Ariel Assault	Thackerville, OK, USA	
Hervey stripped of the title after signing with Bellator.
7	(United States) Derek Campos def. Joe Condon	October 6, 2012; KOTC: Stranglehold	Thackerville, OK, USA	
Campos was stripped of the title.
8	(United States) Lowen Tynanes def. Kris Armbrister	April 11, 2013; KOTC: Devastation	Highland, CA, USA	
Title is vacated.
9	(United States) Joshua Aveles def. Kris Armbrister	October 31, 2013; KOTC: Terrified	Highland, CA, USA	1. def. Joe Condon on Jun 5, 2014 at KOTC: Slugfest; 2. def. Aaron Wetherspoon on Aug 7, 2014 at KOTC: Point of Impact; 3. def. Sam Liera on Oct 2, 2014 at KOTC: Battle for the Belt; 4. def. James Warfield-Lane on Nov 21, 2014 at KOTC: Industrial Strength
10	(United States) Alex Reyes	March 15, 2015; KOTC: Coming Home	San Jacinto, CA, USA	1. def. Thomas Noel on Aug 29, 2015 at KOTC: Bitter Rivals
Reyes vacated the title when he dropped down to the Lightweight division.
11	(United States) Thor Skancke	March 5, 2016; KOTC: Night of Champions	Ontario, CA, USA	
12	(United States) Darren Smith Jr.	June 4, 2016; KOTC: Firefight	San Jacinto, CA, USA	
13	(United States) Ryan Fillingame	September 18, 2016; KOTC: Martial Law	Ontario, CA, USA	
14	(United States) Billy Quarantillo	February 25, 2017; KOTC: Raw Deal	Niagara Falls, NY, USA	
Quarantillo vacated the title when left to compete for V3 Fights.
15	(United States) Juan Archuleta def. Adel El-Tamini	September 2, 2017; KOTC: Never Quit	Ontario, CA, USA	
Archuleta vacated the title in March 2018 when left to compete for Bellator MMA.
16	(United States) Sherwin Price def. Jake Adams	July 21, 2018; KOTC: Perennial	Ignacio, CO, USA	
17	(United States) Nick Angeloni	December 2, 2018; KOTC: Starbound 2	Rio Rancho, NM, USA	
18	(United States) Richie Palomino	September 7, 2019; KOTC: Reaction Time	Parker, AZ, USA	

=== Lightweight Championship ===
146 pounds (66.2 kg) to 155 pounds (70.3 kg)

This weightclass was originally referred to as Middleweight and had an upper weight limit of 160 pounds (72.6 kg)

No.	Name:	Date:	Location:	Defenses:
1	(United States) Charlie Kohler def. Jason Meaders	June 24, 2000; KOTC 4: Gladiators	San Jacinto, CA, USA	
Kohler vacated the title to compete as a Middleweight.
2	(Cuba) Javier Vazquez def. Philip Perez	August 4, 2001; KOTC 10: Critical Mass	San Jacinto, CA, USA	1. def. Sean Wilmot on May 17, 2002 at KOTC 13: Revolution; 2. def. David Gardner on Aug 2, 2002 at KOTC 16: Double Cross
3	(United States) Alberto Crane	February 21, 2003; KOTC 21: Invasion	Albuquerque, NM, USA	
Crane was stripped of the title after leaving the promotion.
4	(United States) Thomas Schulte def. John Mahlow	June 14, 2003; KOTC 24: Mayhem	Albuquerque, NM, USA	
5	(United States) Joe Stevenson	November 2, 2003; KOTC30: The Pinnacle	Pala, CA, USA	
Stevenson was stripped of the title when he left to participate on The Ultimate Fighter 2.
6	(Japan) Takumi Nakayama def. Charlie Kohler	November 14, 2004; KOTC: Revenge	San Jacinto, CA, USA	
7	(United States) Mac Danzig	October 29, 2005; KOTC: Execution Day	Reno, NV, USA	1. def. Jason Ireland on Mar 18, 2006 at KOTC: Drop Zone; 2. def. Orlando Ruiz on Apr 22, 2006 at KOTC: Karnage; 3. def. Buddy Clinton on Aug 4, 2006 at KOTC: Rapid Fire; 4. def. John Mahlow on Sep 29, 2006 at KOTC: Detonator
8	(United States) Clay French	January 19, 2007; KOTC: Hard Knocks	Rockford, IL, USA	1. def. Buddy Clinton on May 26, 2007 at KOTC: Damage Control; 2. def. Buddy Clinton on Aug 5, 2007 at KOTC: Collision Course; 3. def. Jason Ireland on Nov 21, 2007 at KOTC: Bad Boys
9	(Canada) Rory MacDonald	November 28, 2008; KOTC: Grinder	Calgary, Alberta, Canada	
MacDonald vacated the title to compete as a welterweight.
10	(United States) Tony Hervey def. Victor Valenzuela	August 13, 2009; KOTC: Super Stars	Highland, CA, USA	
11	(United States) David Shepherd	December 12, 2009; KOTC: Title Defense	Sault Ste. Marie, MI, USA	
12	(United States) Dom O’Grady	April 16, 2010; KOTC: Bad Boys 2	Detroit, MI, USA	
13	(United States) Bobby Green	April 21, 2011; KOTC: Moral Victory	San Bernardino, CA, USA	
Green vacated the title to fight for Strikeforce.
14	(United States) Tim Means def. Tye Brown	January 21, 2012; KOTC: Total Destruction	Thackerville, OK, USA	
Means vacated the title in February, 2012 to fight for UFC.
15	(United States) JC Cottrell def. Roy Babcock	September 15, 2012; KOTC: Surgical Strike	Norman, OK, USA	
16	(United States) Victor Meza	May 25, 2013; KOTC: World Championships	Scottsdale, AZ, USA	1. def. Benny Madrid on Sep 28, 2013 at KOTC: Boiling Point
17	(United States) Alex Reyes	December 4, 2014; KOTC: Fisticuffs	Highland, CA, USA	1. def. Joshua Aveles on Mar 15, 2015 at KOTC: Coming Home
Reyes vacated the title when he moved up to the Jr. Welterweight division.
18	(United States) Juan Archuleta def. Chris Tickle	June 4, 2016; KOTC: Firefight	San Jacinto, CA, USA	1. def. Brandon Hastings on Mar 18, 2017 at KOTC: Supernova
Archuleta vacated the title when he decided to concentrate on other weight classes.
19	(United States) Blaze Gill def. Jake Adams	January 13, 2018; KOTC: Mercenaries 2	Sloan, IA, USA	
Gill vacated the title or was stripped for unknown reasons.
20	(United States) Piankhi Zimmerman def. Keith Forant	October 9, 2021; KOTC: Legendary	Niagara Falls, NY, USA	
21	(United States) Dennis Linton def. Toby Misech	November 2, 2024; KOTC: Clash of Champions	Lincoln City, OR, USA	

=== Bantamweight Championship ===
136 pounds (61.7 kg) to 145 pounds (65.8 kg)

Prior to 2004 this weight class was referred to as Flyweight.

No.	Name	Date	Location	Defenses
1	(United States) David Step def. Jeff Cahill	February 5, 2000; KOTC 2: Desert Storm	San Jacinto, CA, USA	
Step vacated the title after retiring from competition.
2	(United States) Charlie Valencia def. David Velasquez	February 9, 2002; KOTC 12: Cold Blood	San Jacinto, CA, USA	
Valencia vacated the title to take a 2 year hiatus.
3	(United States) Frankie Bollinger def. Richard Goodman	September 24, 2004; KOTC: Relentless	San Jacinto, CA, USA	
Bollinger vacated the title for unknown reasons.
4	(United States) Urijah Faber def. Eben Kaneshiro	November 14, 2004; KOTC: Revenge	San Jacinto, CA, USA	1. def. Hiroyuki Abe on May 7, 2005 at KOTC: Predator; 2. def. Shawn Bias on Oct 29, 2005 at KOTC: Mortal Sins; 3. def. Charles Bennett on Dec 11, 2005 at GC 46: Avalanche; 4. def. Charlie Valencia on May 13, 2006 at KOTC: Predator; 5. def. Bibiano Fernandes on Oct 28, 2006 at KOTC All Stars
Faber vacated the title in December, 2006 after signing with the WEC exclusively.
5	(United States) Matt Jaggers def. Joe Voison	February 22, 2008; KOTC: Stand Off	Mt. Pleasant, MI, USA	
6	(United States) Lazar Stojadinovic	June 13, 2008; KOTC: Settlement	Mt. Pleasant, MI, USA	
-	(United States) Angelo Sanchez def. Tony Hervey for interim title	December 6, 2008; KOTC: Goodfellas	Albuquerque, NM, USA	1. def. Nathan Torrez on Mar 7, 2009 at KOTC: New Breed; 2. def. Donald Sanchez on May 30, 2009 at KOTC: Retribution II
Stojadinovic was stripped of the title.
7	(United States) Angelo Sanchez promoted to undisputed champion	-	-	
-	(United States) Donald Sanchez def. Lazar Stojadinovic for interim title	August 1, 2009; KOTC: Gate Keeper	Mescalero, NM, USA	1. def. Richard Montano on Nov 28, 2009 at KOTC: Horse Power; 2. def. Victor Valenzuela on Feb 12, 2010 at KOTC: Vengeance
8	(United States) Donald Sanchez	May 14, 2010; KOTC: Honor	Mescalero, NM, USA	1. def. Pat McGreal on Sep 17, 2010 at KOTC: No Mercy; 2. def. Scott Bear on Jan 15, 2011 at KOTC: Confrontation
9	(United States) Jeremy Spoon	August 20, 2011; KOTC: Overdrive	Norman, OK, USA	
Spoon was stripped of the title after signing with Bellator.
10	(United States) Donald Sanchez (2) def. Jamie Steichen	March 17, 2012; KOTC: Prohibited	Norman, OK, USA	1. def. Warren Stewart on May 12, 2012 at KOTC: Nightmare; 2. def. Jimmy Van Horn on Aug 11, 2012 at KOTC: Ignite; 3. def. Matt Comeau on Jan 19, 2013 at KOTC: Regulators
Sanchez was stripped of the title after signing with Bellator.
11	(United States) Henry Corrales def. Jerod Spoon	October 31, 2013; KOTC: Terrified	Highland, CA, USA	1. def. Seth Dikun on Mar 6, 2014 at KOTC: Beaten Path; 2. def. Alex Garcia on Jun 5, 2014 at KOTC: Slugfest; 3. def. Seth Dikun on Oct 2, 2014 at KOTC: Battle for the Belt; 4. def. Aaron Neveu on Mar 15, 2015 at KOTC: Coming Home
Corrales was stripped of the title after signing with Bellator MMA.
12	(United States) Jordan Griffin def. Seth Dikun	August 8, 2015; KOTC: Warriors Collide	St. Michael, ND, USA	1. def. Justin Likness on Nov 14, 2015 at KOTC: Battle at the Lake; 2. def. Adam Ward on April 8, 2016 at KOTC: Generation X
13	(United States) Juan Archuleta	July 23, 2016; KOTC: Destructive Intent	Washington, PA, USA	1. def. Mark Dickman on Dec. 3, 2017 at KOTC: Conquistadores
Archuleta was stripped of the title after signing with Bellator MMA.
14	(United States) Tony Gravely def. Drako Rodriguez	September 15, 2018; KOTC: Territorial Conflict	Niagara Falls, NY, USA	
Gravely was stripped of the title after signing with CES MMA.
15	(Mexico) Juan Beltran def. DeMarcus Brown	March 10, 2019; KOTC: Sin Rival	Ontario, CA, USA	
16	(United States) Aaron Williams	December 8, 2019; KOTC: Hard Drive	Ontario, CA, USA	
17	(Mexico) Juan Beltran	December 5, 2021; KOTC: Kick Start	Ontario, CA, USA	1. def. Aaron Williams on Dec. 5, 2021 at KOTC: Conquistadores
18	(United States) Dennis Linton def. Tristin Kamaka	February 10, 2024; KOTC: Grudge Match	Lincoln City, OR, USA	

=== Flyweight Championship ===
126 pounds (57.2 kg) to 135 pounds (61.2 kg)

No.	Name	Date	Location	Defenses
1	(United States) Shawn Ramage def. Kevin Alliva	August 10, 2003; KOTC: Aftermath	San Jacinto, CA, USA	
Ramage vacated the title after retiring from competition.
2	(United States) Del Hawkins def. Victor Hernandez	July 9, 2005; KOTC: Caliente	Globe, AZ, USA	
Hawkins vacated the title for unknown reasons.
3	(United States) Manny Tapia def. Gregory Vivian	August 5, 2005; KOTC: Prime Time	San Jacinto, CA, USA	
Tapia was stripped of the title after signing with the WEC.
4	(United States) Ryan Diaz def. Ed Newalu	March 10, 2007; KOTC: Caged Chaos	Laughlin, NV, USA	
5	(United States) Abel Cullum	May 17, 2008; KOTC: Reckless	Greenville, MS, USA	1. def. Brett Roller on Dec 6, 2008 at KOTC: Goodfellas; 2. def. Richard Montano on Aug 1, 2009 at KOTC: Gate Keeper; 3. def. Joe Coca on Feb 12, 2010 at KOTC: Vengeance; 4. def. Joshua Montoya on May 14, 2010 at KOTC: Honor
6	(United States) Jimmie Rivera	September 17, 2010; KOTC: No Mercy	Mashantucket, CT, USA	1. def. Jared Papazian on Feb 3, 2011 at KOTC: Empire
Rivera vacated the title for unknown reasons.
7	(United States) Jared Papazian def. Abel Cullum	June 24, 2011; KOTC: Epic Force	Thackerville, OK, USA	1. def. Marvin Garcia on Sep 15, 2011 at KOTC: First Defense
Papazian was stripped of the title after signing with the UFC.
8	(United States) Frank Baca def. Marvin Garcia	February 2, 2012; KOTC: Reckless Abandon	Highland, CA, USA	
9	(United States) Russell Doane	July 14, 2012; KOTC: ALI'Is	Honolulu, HI, USA	
Doane stripped of the title after signing with Pacific Xtreme Combat.
10	(United States) Marvin Garcia def. Justin Robbins	December 20, 2012; KOTC: Vigilante	Highland, CA, USA	
11	(United States) Frankie Saenz	May 25, 2013; KOTC: World Championships	Scottsdale, AZ, USA	1. def. Tyler Bialecki on Sep 28, 2013 at KOTC: Boiling Point; 2. def. Marvin Blumer on Feb 22, 2014 at KOTC: Radar Lock
-	(United States) Randy Steinke def. Ian De La Cuesta for interim title	July 20, 2013; KOTC: Heated Fury	Scottsdale, AZ, USA	1. def. Imani Jackson on May 26, 2014 at KOTC: Alliance
Saenz stripped of the title in August 2014 after signing with the UFC.
12	(United States) Randy Steinke promoted to undisputed champion	August 2014 -	-	
-	(United States) Reuben Duran def. Eduardo Torres for interim title	October 2, 2014; KOTC: Battle for the Belt	Highland, CA, USA	1. def. Andrew Natividad on Aug 29, 2015 at KOTC: Bitter Rivals
13	(United States) Derrick Mandell	July 8, 2016; KOTC: Ultimate Collision	Carlton, MN, USA	
14	(United States) Juan Archuleta	Dec. 18, 2016; KOTC: Warranted Aggression	Ontario, CA, USA	
Archuleta vacated the title to pursue heavier weight classes.
15	(United States) Patrick Mix def. Andre Ewell	Nov. 18, 2017; KOTC: Ultimate Mix	Salamanca, NY, USA	1. def. Tony Gravely on May 12, 2018 at KOTC: No Retreat; 2. def. Keith Richardson on Nov. 10, 2018 at KOTC: In The Mix
Mix was stripped of the title after signing with Bellator MMA.
16	(United States) Johnny Muñoz Jr. def. Rentsen Otgontulga	June 22, 2019; KOTC: Golden Era	Ontario, CA, USA	

=== Light Flyweight Championship ===
116 pounds (52.6 kg) to 125 pounds (56.7 kg)

No.	Name	Date	Location	Defenses
1	(Japan) Mamoru Yamaguchi def. Frank Baca	January 30, 2010; KOTC: Toryumon	Okinawa, Japan	
Title is vacated.
2	(United States) Josh Paiva def. Zach Lari	August 17, 2013; KOTC: Unprecedented	Oroville, CA, USA	
3	(United States) Anthony Figueroa	November 30, 2013; KOTC: Enemy Territory	Oroville, CA, USA	
Figueroa stripped of the title after signing with Tachi Palace Fights.
4	(United States) John DeVall def. Nate Williams	August 1, 2015; KOTC: Rumble on the River	Sloan, Iowa, USA	
DeVall vacated the title to challenge for the championship in a higher division.
5	(United States) Tim Sosa def. Johnny Guillen	November 26, 2016; KOTC: Duke City 2	Albuquerque, New Mexico, USA	1. def. Gonzalo Ponce on Mar 11, 2017 at KOTC: Bloody War
6	(United States) Reuben Duran	February 24, 2018; KOTC: Energetic Pursuit	Ontario, California, USA	

=== Women's Flyweight Championship ===
126 pounds (57.2 kg) to 135 pounds (61.2 kg)

No.	Name	Date	Location	Defenses
1	(United States) Shanna Young def. Christina Jobe	November 21, 2015; KOTC: Bear Brawl	Carlton, MN, USA	1. def. Pam Sorenson on April 8, 2016 at KOTC: Generation X.
-	(United States) Pam Sorenson def. Brenda Gonzales for interim title	July 30, 2016; KOTC: Natural Instinct	Lac du Flambeau, WI, USA	1. def. Christina Barry on September 9, 2016 at KOTC: Due Process.

=== Women's Light Flyweight Championship ===
116 pounds (52.6 kg) to 125 pounds (56.7 kg)

No.	Name	Date	Location	Defenses
1	(United States) Sarah Alpar def. Monica Lovato	May 12, 2012; KOTC: Nightmare	Santa Fe, NM, USA	
2	(United States) Brenda Gonzales	October 6, 2012; KOTC: Stranglehold	Thackerville, OK, USA	1. def. Elsie Zwicker on Dec 1, 2012 at KOTC: Battlegrounds
Gonzales vacated the title to move up in a weight class.
3	(United States) Nicco Montaño def. Jamie Milanowski	October 8, 2016; KOTC: Social Disorder	Sloan, IA, USA	
Montano vacated the title when she signed with the UFC.
4	(United States) Glena Avila def. Angela Danzig	May 26, 2018; KOTC: Grand Finale	Lincoln City, OR, USA	

=== Women's Strawweight Championship ===
106 pounds (48.1 kg) to 115 pounds (52.2 kg)

No.	Name	Date	Location	Defenses
1	(United States) Danielle Taylor def. Glena Avila	Feb 12, 2015; KOTC: Short Fuse	Worley, ID, USA	
2	(United States) Jamie Colleen	Aug 29, 2015; KOTC: Bitter Rivals	Ontario, CA, USA	1. def. Calie Cutler on January 8, 2016 at KOTC: Thunder n' Lightning
3	(United States) Danielle Taylor (2)	March 5, 2016; KOTC: Night of Champions	Ontario, CA, USA	
Taylor vacated the title on July 28, 2016 when she signed with the UFC.
4	(United States) Stephanie Frausto def. Angela Danzig	June 24, 2017; KOTC: Flashback	Oroville, CA, USA	
Frausto was stripped of title due to inactivity.
5	(United States) Cynthia Arceo def. Chelsea Faulder	Feb. 24, 2018; KOTC: Energetic Pursuit	Ontario, CA, USA	-. vs. Loveth Young (ended in a Draw) on June 10, 2018 at KOTC: Highlight Reel
6	(United States) Loveth Young	Oct. 27, 2018; KOTC: 20th Anniversary	Ontario, CA, USA	

=== Women's Atomweight Championship ===
Until 105 pounds (47.6 kg)

No.	Name	Date	Location	Defenses
1	(United States) Andy Nguyen def. Elane Santiago	Apr 9, 2016; KOTC: New Era	Sloan, IA, USA	1. def. Cassie Robb on October 8, 2016 at KOTC: Social Disorder; 2. def. Bi Nguyen on May 6, 2017 at KOTC: Groundbreaking
2	(Canada) Melissa Karagianis	Aug 12, 2017; KOTC: Counterstrike	Niagara Falls, NY, USA	
3	(United States) Jayme Hinshaw	Nov 10, 2017; KOTC: Unstoppable 2	Carlton, MN, USA	1. def. Bi Nguyen on July 21, 2018 at KOTC: Perennial

=== Light Heavyweight Superfight ===
No.	Name:	Date:	Location:	Defenses:
1	(United States) Vernon White def. Todd Medina	April 15, 2000; KOTC 3: Knockout Nightmare	San Jacinto, CA, USA	1. def. David Dodd on Nov 29, 2000 at KOTC 6: Road Warriors
Retired Superfight Championship to pursue World Championship.
2	(United States) Jesse Murray def. Eddie Larrea	August 5, 2017; KOTC: Second Coming	Wyandotte, MI, USA	
Retired Superfight Championship to pursue World Championship.

=== CANADIAN Middleweight Championship ===
King of the Cage's Canadian branch has held no events since June 16, 2017; the three Canadian titles below have not been contested since.

No.	Name:	Date:	Location:	Defenses:
1	(Canada) Elmer Waterhen def. Mike Froese	March 9, 2012; KOTC: Infamy	Edmonton, Alberta, Canada	
Waterhen vacated the title when he dropped down to Welterweight.
2	(Canada) Drayton Angus def. Trent Thorne	June 12, 2015; KOTC: Mach 3	Cold Lake, Alberta, Canada	
3	(Canada) Elmer Waterhen (2)	March 4, 2016; KOTC: Wrecking Ball	Calgary, Alberta, Canada	

=== CANADIAN Welterweight Championship ===
No.	Name:	Date:	Location:	Defenses:
1	(Canada) Elmer Waterhen def. Garett Davis	November 16, 2012; KOTC: Stand and Deliver	Edmonton, Alberta, Canada	
2	(Canada) Chris Mattock	September 27, 2013; KOTC: A New Dawn	Medicine Hat, Alberta, Canada	
Mattock vacated the title to go compete in Hard Knocks.
3	(Canada) Jarid Bussemakers def. Kolton Menzak	March 3, 2017; KOTC: Canada 72	Cold Lake, Alberta, Canada	

=== CANADIAN Bantamweight Championship ===
No.	Name	Date	Location	Defenses
1	(Canada) Josh Machan def. Behrang Yousefi	April 28, 2012; KOTC: Unified	Grande Prairie, Alberta, Canada	1. def. Alex Halkias on October 25, 2013 at KOTC: Anger Therapy

== Retired Titles ==
=== Openweight Championship ===
No.	Name	Date	Location	Defenses
1	(United States) Steven Treadwell def. Mike Bourke	October 30, 1999; KOTC 1: Bas Rutten's King of the Cage	San Jacinto, CA, USA	
2	(United States) John Matua	February 5, 2000; KOTC 2: Desert Storm	San Jacinto, CA, USA	
3	(United States) Mike Bourke	September 16, 2000; KOTC 5: Cage Wars	San Jacinto, CA, USA	

=== Openweight Superfight ===
No.	Name	Date	Location	Defenses
1	(United States) Ricco Rodriguez def. Paul Buentello	February 24, 2001; KOTC 7: Wet and Wild	San Jacinto, CA, USA	

=== Light Heavyweight Superfight ===
No.	Name	Date	Location	Defenses
1	(United States) Quinton Jackson def. Bryson Haubrick	April 7, 2001; KOTC 8: Bombs Away	Williams, CA, USA	

=== Heavyweight Superfight ===
No.	Name	Date	Location	Defenses
1	(United States) Brian Foster def. Frank Rodriguez	October 30, 1999; KOTC 1: Bas Rutten's King of the Cage	San Jacinto, CA, USA	
2	(United States) Romie Aram	February 5, 2000; KOTC 2: Desert Storm	San Jacinto, CA, USA	

=== Middleweight Superfight ===
No.	Name	Date	Location	Defenses
1	(United States) Chris Brennan def. Joe Stevenson	October 30, 1999; KOTC 1: Bas Rutten's King of the Cage	San Jacinto, CA, USA	1. def. Antonio McKee on Apr 15, 2000 at KOTC 3: Knockout Nightmare
2	(United States) Joe Hurley	September 16, 2000; KOTC 5: Cage Wars	San Jacinto, CA, USA	1. def. Charlie Kohler on Feb 24, 2001 at KOTC 7: Wet and Wild
3	(United States) Gil Castillo	April 29, 2001; KOTC 8: Bombs Away	Williams, CA, USA	
4	(Australia) Tony Bonello def. Mansour Heidari	November 2, 2003; KOTC 30: The Pinnacle	Pala, CA, USA	

== Most consecutive title defenses ==
The following includes all KOTC champions who were able to consecutively defend their title three times or more. Fighters with the same number of title defenses are listed chronologically.

Defenses	Champion	Division	Period
7	(United States) Joey Villasenor	Middleweight	Sep 24, 2004 - Oct, 2006
6	(South Africa) Trevor Prangley	Light Heavyweight	Dec 20, 2012 - Aug 6, 2016
5	(United States) Urijah Faber	Bantamweight	Nov 14, 2004 - Dec, 2006
5	(United States) Aaron Wetherspoon (Note: Wetherspoon successfully defended the Welterweight title four times and retained the title once following a No contest against Anthony Lapsley at KOTC: Opposing Force.)	Welterweight	Aug 4, 2006 - Aug 14, 2008
5	(United States) Tony Lopez (4)	Heavyweight	Sep 5, 2015 - Feb 3, 2018
4	(United States) Mac Danzig	Lightweight	Oct 29, 2005 - Jan 19, 2007
4	(United States) Abel Cullum	Flyweight	May 17, 2008 - Sep 17, 2010
4	(United States) Tony Lopez	Light Heavyweight	Oct 16, 2008 - May 14, 2010
4	(United States) Sean Strickland	Middleweight	Apr 26, 2012 - Mar 3, 2014
4	(United States) Henry Corrales	Bantamweight	Oct 31, 2013 - Mar 15, 2015
4	(United States) Joshua Aveles	Light Welterweight	Oct 31, 2013 - Mar 15, 2015
3	(United States) Joe Stevenson	Welterweight	Nov 29 2000 - Oct 19, 2002
3	(United States) James Lee	Light Heavyweight	Feb 10, 2006 - Nov 21, 2007
3	(United States) Clay French	Lightweight	Jan 19, 2007 - Nov 28, 2008
3	(United States) Tony Lopez (2)	Heavyweight	Jul 19, 2008 - Mar 26, 2010
3	(United States) Quinn Mulhern	Welterweight	Mar 26, 2010 - May 6, 2011
3	(United States) Brandon Hunt	Middleweight	Apr 16, 2010 - Apr 26, 2012
3	(United States) Tim Means	Light Welterweight	Oct 7, 2010 - Feb, 2012
3	(United States) Tony Lopez (3)	Heavyweight	Dec 15, 2011 - Apr 11, 2013
3	(United States) Donald Sanchez	Bantamweight	Mar 17, 2012 - Jan 19, 2013
3	(United States) Daniel Hernandez	Middleweight	Oct 2, 2014 - Aug 1, 2015
3	(United States) Ben Egli	Welterweight	Oct 1, 2016 - Aug 5, 2017

== Most wins in title bouts ==
Fighters with four or more championship and/or interim championship title wins. Fighters with the same number of title wins are arranged in order of most title fights. Openweight and Superfight champions are not included.

Title wins	Champion	Division	Record in title fights
22	(United States) Tony Lopez	Super Heavyweight; Heavyweight; Light Heavyweight	2 - 1 - 0; 14 - 2 - 0; 6 - 3 - 0
10	(United States) Donald Sanchez	Light Welterweight; Bantamweight	0 - 1 - 0; 10 - 2 - 0
8	(United States) Joey Villasenor	Middleweight	8 - 0 - 0
7	(United States) Joshua Aveles	Welterweight; Light Welterweight	3 - 2 - 0; 4 - 0 - 0
7	(South Africa) Trevor Prangley	Light Heavyweight	7 - 0 - 0
6	(United States) Aaron Wetherspoon	Welterweight; Light Welterweight	6 - 1 - 0; 0 - 1 - 0
6	(United States) Urijah Faber	Bantamweight	6 - 0 - 0
5	(United States) David Gomez	Welterweight	5 - 3 - 0
5	(United States) Abel Cullum	Flyweight	5 - 2 - 0
5	(United States) Brandon Hunt	Middleweight	5 - 2 - 0
5	(United States) Mac Danzig	Lightweight	5 - 1 - 0
5	(United States) Joe Stevenson	Welterweight; Lightweight	4 - 1 - 0; 1 - 0 - 0
5	(United States) Tim Means	Light Welterweight; Lightweight	4 - 0 - 0; 1 - 0 - 0
5	(United States) Sean Strickland	Middleweight	5 - 0 - 0
4	(United States) Quinn Mulhern	Welterweight	4 - 1 - 0
4	(United States) Clay French	Lightweight	4 - 1 - 0
4	(United States) James Lee	Light Heavyweight	4 - 0 - 0
4	(United States) Henry Corrales	Bantamweight	4 - 0 - 0
4	(United States) Dennis Linton	Bantamweight; Lightweight	3 - 0 - 0; 1 - 0 - 0
