= King of the Cage =

MMA promoter based in California

- Type: Private
- Industry: Mixed martial arts promotion
- Founded: 1998; 28 years ago
- Founder: Terry Trebilcock
- Headquarters: Rancho Cucamonga, California, United States
- Website: http://www.kingofthecage.com

King of the Cage (KOTC) is a mixed martial arts promotion based in Southern California, United States.

== History ==
KOTC was founded in 1998 by Terry Trebilcock Jr. KOTC features mostly amateur as well as up and coming MMA stars and former mainstream combat fighters.

KOTC has promoted a majority of its events at Native American casinos throughout the United States. KOTC also promotes events in Canada, Australia & Japan. King of the Cage events are also broadcast on most national pay-per-view platforms.

In September 2007, Trebilcock Jr. sold KOTC to ProElite. Two years later, in July 2009, he reacquired 100% ownership of KOTC and simultaneously entered into a joint venture agreement with Mark Burnett Productions (Survivor, The Apprentice, The Celebrity Apprentice and The Contender) to begin the development of a reality television program. Bully Beatdown, a Burnett produced program, aired three seasons on MTV and featured several KOTC competitors.

On January 30, 2010, it was announced that KOTC would begin airing monthly shows on Mark Cuban's HDNet channel. The initial deal was for 36 events to air. The announcers included Michael Schiavello, Jason "Mayhem" Miller and Maria Kanellis. The most recent event on HDNet aired on September 17, 2010 with No Mercy. There has been no further news regarding King of the Cage events on the channel. Only 6 events aired from February 2010 to September 2010.

In November 2012, MAVTV struck a five-year deal with King of the Cage, taking exclusive North American rights to broadcast a new two-hour KOTC event every Wednesday; the promotion described the agreement as covering 260 events.

In March 2017 KOTC announced that it had signed fourteen women to exclusive multi-fight contracts, forming atomweight (105 lb) and strawweight (115 lb) divisions that it said would be capped at eight fighters each. The same announcement stated that the promotion had reached an agreement with the UFC under which its bouts would be made available on UFC Fight Pass following their initial MAVTV broadcast.

The promotion's Canadian branch, which staged 71 events, held its final card on June 16, 2017. KOTC has continued to promote regularly in the United States, largely at tribal casinos in Oregon, Idaho, Nevada and California, surpassing 600 events by 2026, and full seasons of its events are streamed free on demand through Pluto TV.

== Current champions ==
The weight division system of KOTC is in accordance with the Unified Rules of Mixed Martial Arts, but KOTC names its 145-pound division Bantamweight (instead of Featherweight), its 135-pound division Flyweight (instead of Bantamweight) and its 125-pound division Light Flyweight (instead of Flyweight). The only three weight classes not in accordance with the Unified Rules are a 165-pound division (Light Welterweight), a 195-pound division (Super Middleweight), and a 230-pound division (Cruiserweight).

Division	Upper weight limit	Champion	Nationality
Men's divisions
Super Heavyweight	No limit	Ronny Markes	Brazil
Heavyweight	265 lb (120.2 kg; 18.9 st)	Jordan Currie	United States
Cruiserweight	230 lb (104.3 kg; 16.4 st)	Victor Torres	United States
Light Heavyweight	205 lb (93.0 kg; 14.6 st)	Fernando Alvarado	United States
Super Middleweight	195 lb (88.5 kg; 13.9 st)	Erik Herbert	United States
Middleweight	185 lb (83.9 kg; 13.2 st)	EL J Portée	United States
Welterweight	175 lb (79.4 kg; 12.5 st)	Cameron Robinett	United States
Light Welterweight	165 lb (74.8 kg; 11.8 st)	Richie Palomino	United States
Lightweight	155 lb (70.3 kg; 11.1 st)	Dennis Linton	United States
Bantamweight	145 lb (65.8 kg; 10.4 st)	Dennis Linton	United States
Flyweight	135 lb (61.2 kg; 9.6 st)	Johnny Muñoz Jr.	United States
Light Flyweight	125 lb (56.7 kg; 8.9 st)	Reuben Duran	United States
Women's divisions
Women's Flyweight	135 lb (61.2 kg; 9.6 st)	Shanna Young	United States
Women's Light Flyweight	125 lb (56.7 kg; 8.9 st)	Glena Avila	United States
Women's Strawweight	115 lb (52.2 kg; 8.2 st)	Loveth Young	United States
Women's Atomweight	105 lb (47.6 kg; 7.5 st)	Jayme Hinshaw	United States

== See also ==
- List of KOTC events
- List of King of the Cage champions

Yearly event Wikipedia pages:

- 1999 in King of the Cage
- 2000 in King of the Cage
- 2001 in King of the Cage
- 2002 in King of the Cage
- 2003 in King of the Cage
- 2004 in King of the Cage
- 2005 in King of the Cage
- 2006 in King of the Cage
- 2007 in King of the Cage
- 2008 in King of the Cage
- 2009 in King of the Cage
- 2010 in King of the Cage
- 2011 in King of the Cage
