= Bobby Hoffman =

American mixed martial artist

- Born: October 28, 1966 (age 59); Centerville, Iowa, United States
- Other names: The Truth
- Height: 6 ft 2 in (1.88 m)
- Weight: 245 lb (111 kg; 17 st 7 lb)
- Division: Heavyweight
- Stance: Orthodox
- Fighting out of: Bettendorf, Iowa, United States
- Team: Universal Grappling Academy; Miletich Fighting Systems (1999–2001)
- Years active: 1998–2006

Mixed martial arts record
- Total: 49
- Wins: 36
- By knockout: 23
- By submission: 6
- By decision: 7
- Losses: 10
- By knockout: 1
- By submission: 5
- By decision: 4
- Draws: 1
- No contests: 2

Other information
- Mixed martial arts record from Sherdog

Bobby "The Truth" Hoffman (born October 28, 1966) is a retired American mixed martial artist who competed in the heavyweight division. He is the former King of the Cage super heavyweight champion as well as the former King of the Cage heavyweight champion. Having made his professional debut in 1998, Hoffman has also formerly competed for the UFC, RINGS, and Jungle Fight. During his career, Hoffman defeated world champions Alistair Overeem and Ricco Rodriguez.

== Background ==
Hoffman found mixed martial arts, then known as "shootfighting", after being released from jail, spending 92 consecutive days in solitary confinement for assault charges. Hoffman, a talented wrestler and football player, attended Ellsworth Community College and the University of Akron before leaving college a year early to compete in the NFL for the Cleveland Browns. Hoffman spent half of a season with the team before being released. Two days out of jail, Hoffman attended a local fight and after the originally scheduled fighter did not show up, spectators were asked if they wanted to step in for the absent fighter. Hoffman accepted the challenge, and won the bout.

== Mixed martial arts ==
=== Early career ===
Hoffman compiled a professional record of 8-1 before making his debut for the SuperBrawl organization in Hawaii on September 7, 1999. After knocking out future UFC heavyweight champion, Ricco Rodriguez and defeating future Pride Heavyweight Championship contender, Heath Herring, via unanimous decision, Hoffman lost to future UFC heavyweight champion Josh Barnett by unanimous decision. Hoffman had suffered a broken arm in the win over Herring, but ignored the doctor's advice and fought Barnett in the final. After following this up with two more wins, Hoffman was invited to compete for the RINGS organization in Japan.

=== RINGS ===
Hoffman made his RINGS debut, which was also his overseas debut, on February 26, 2000 in Tokyo, Japan at the RINGS: King of Kings 1999 final. Hoffman faced Georgia Olympic freestyle wrestling competitor, Zaza Tkeshelashvili, whom Hoffman defeated via knockout only 34 seconds into the fight. After compiling two more wins, Hoffman fought future Dream heavyweight champion, Strikeforce heavyweight champion, and K-1 World Grand Prix champion, Alistair Overeem at RINGS: Millennium Combine 2. Hoffman won via knockout at 9:39 of the first round. After winning his next four fights, two of which in the RINGS organization, Hoffman was invited to compete for the UFC.

=== UFC ===
Hoffman made his UFC debut against former UFC heavyweight champion, Maurice Smith at UFC 27 on September 22, 2000. Hoffman, who seemed to lack cardio and conditioning, lost the bout via unanimous decision. Eight days later, Hoffman won the RINGS USA: Rising Stars Tournament and then had two more fights with the Japan-based organization before returning to the UFC at UFC 30. Hoffman faced South African Mark Robinson and originally won the bout via knockout at 3:27 of the first round, but the decision was later changed to a no-contest as it was revealed that Hoffman failed a drug test for marijuana.

Hoffman went 5-0-1 in his next six fights with wins in the RINGS organization against Mikhail Ilyukhin and Ryushi Yanagisawa, and also became the King of the Cage super heavyweight champion on June 23, 2001, after defeating Kauai Kupihea via submission due to punches. Hoffman was later stripped of his title after leaving the promotion, with the win over Ilyukhin being his next fight. After returning to King of the Cage and defeating wrestling star Tim Catalfo via submission due to punches, Hoffman returned to fight for the UFC at UFC 34 against Josh Barnett, who had defeated Hoffman earlier in his career via unanimous decision. Hoffman lost the bout via TKO at 4:25 of the second round in what was the first TKO/KO loss of his career. Both Hoffman and Barnett failed drug tests for the fight, Hoffman for marijuana, as he admittedly smoked it only hours before the fight, and Barnett for multiple banned substances. This would be Hoffman's last fight for the organization and Barnett would become the new UFC heavyweight champion before having his title stripped for another failed drug test.

=== Post-UFC ===
After spending over a year in prison for domestic abuse, Hoffman returned to mixed martial arts competition for the King of the Cage organization. Hoffman became the first King of the Cage heavyweight champion in his second fight back after a TKO win over Jason Godsey and then defended his title against Paul Buentello via unanimous decision. Hoffman then lost a rematch with Buentello, also losing his title, but would bounce back with two wins before being handed his next loss against Carlos Barreto in Hoffman's debut for the Jungle Fight organization in Brazil at Jungle Fight 2. Hoffman fought again for King of the Cage, against veteran Ruben "Warpath" Villareal, and won via armbar submission before returning to Brazil for a bout in Jungle Fight 3, which he lost via triangle-choke submission.

Hoffman lost a rematch with Eric Pele via TKO before facing Tony Bonello in Australia. After the first bout ended in a no-contest, the two had a rematch two months later again in Bonello's home-country of Australia which Bonello won via submission due to punches. Hoffman then bounced back with a win via triangle-choke submission a month later, before winning his last mixed martial arts fight via TKO only eight seconds into the first round.

== Personal life ==
Hoffman was dropped by manager Monte Cox after reportedly threatening to kill Cox's wife and children while Hoffman was fighting in Japan.

Hoffman and his girlfriend, Patricia, wed the night after Hoffman's UFC 34 loss to Barnett. Weeks later on the night of their honeymoon, Hoffman, under the influence of alcohol and Vicodin, severely beat his wife. He was later arrested and spent over a year in a maximum-security prison in Shafter, California, for his actions. His wife, who was only 20 years old at the time and around 125 pounds, almost died as a result of her injuries and the two later divorced.

== Championships and accomplishments ==
- Fighting Network RINGS
  - 2000 Rising Stars Heavyweight Tournament winner
  - 2001 RINGS Openweight Championship Tournament runner-up
- Icon Sport
  - SuperBrawl 13 Heavyweight Tournament runner-up
- King of the Cage
  - KOTC Super Heavyweight Championship (1 time)
  - KOTC Heavyweight Championship (1 time, first)
  - One successful title defense

== Mixed martial arts record ==
Professional record breakdown
49 matches	36 wins	10 losses
By knockout	23	4
By submission	6	2
By decision	7	4
Draws	1	
No contests	2	

Res.	Record	Opponent	Method	Event	Date	Round	Time	Location	Notes
Win	36–10–1 (2)	Chuck Grigsby	TKO (punches)	Mainstream MMA: Inferno	August 12, 2006	1	1:47	Cedar Rapids, Iowa, United States	
Win	35–10–1 (2)	Paul O'Keefe	Submission (arm-triangle choke)	KOTC: Predator	May 13, 2006	1	1:29	Globe, Arizona, United States	
Loss	34–10–1 (2)	Tony Bonello	TKO (submission to punches)	KOTC: Unfinished Business	April 28, 2006	1	1:48	Sydney, Australia	
NC	34–9–1 (2)	Tony Bonello	NC (overturned)	KOTC: Gunfather	February 10, 2006	1	2:28	Australia	Controversial stoppage, overturned later after appeal.
Loss	34–9–1 (1)	Eric Pele	TKO (punches)	KOTC: Mortal Sins	May 7, 2005	2	2:55	Primm, Nevada, United States	For the vacant KOTC Super Heavyweight Championship.
Loss	34–8–1 (1)	Leopoldo Montenegro	Submission (triangle choke)	Jungle Fight 3	October 23, 2004	1	2:59	Manaus, Brazil	
Win	34–7–1 (1)	Ruben Villareal	Submission (armbar)	KOTC 39: Hitmaster	August 6, 2004	1	4:02	San Jacinto, California, United States	
Loss	33–7–1 (1)	Carlos Barreto	TKO (submission to punches)	Jungle Fight 2	May 15, 2004	2	N/A	Manaus, Brazil	
Win	33–6–1 (1)	Mike Wolmack	KO (knee)	GC 25: Gladiator Challenge 25	April 20, 2004	1	1:00	Porterville, California, United States	
Win	32–6–1 (1)	Ladislav Zak	Decision (split)	2H2H: 2 Hot 2 Handle	February 22, 2004	3	5:00	Amsterdam, Netherlands	
Loss	31–6–1 (1)	Paul Buentello	Submission (verbal)	KOTC 30: The Pinnacle	November 2, 2003	2	N/A	San Jacinto, California, United States	Lost the KOTC Heavyweight Championship.
Win	31–5–1 (1)	Paul Buentello	Decision (unanimous)	KOTC 27: Aftermath	August 10, 2003	3	5:00	San Jacinto, California, United States	Defended the KOTC Heavyweight Championship.
Win	30–5–1 (1)	Jason Godsey	TKO (punches)	KOTC 21: Invasion	February 21, 2003	1	1:56	Albuquerque, New Mexico, United States	Won the inaugural KOTC Heavyweight Championship.
Win	29–5–1 (1)	Sam Sotello	TKO (injury)	KOTC 21: Invasion	February 21, 2003	2	0:23	Albuquerque, New Mexico, United States	
Loss	28–5–1 (1)	Josh Barnett	TKO (punches)	UFC 34	November 2, 2001	2	4:25	Las Vegas, Nevada, United States	
Win	28–4–1 (1)	Tim Catalfo	TKO (submission to strikes)	KOTC 11: Domination	September 29, 2001	1	3:56	San Jacinto, California, United States	
Win	27–4–1 (1)	Mikhail Ilyukhin	TKO (corner stoppage)	Rings: 10th Anniversary	August 11, 2001	2	5:00	Tokyo, Japan	
Win	26–4–1 (1)	Kauai Kupihea	TKO (submission to punches)	KOTC 9: Showtime	June 23, 2001	2	4:00	San Jacinto, California, United States	Won the vacant KOTC Super Heavyweight Championship.
Draw	25–4–1 (1)	Bob Schrijber	Draw	RINGS Holland: No Guts, No Glory	June 10, 2001	2	5:00	Amsterdam, Netherlands	
Win	25–4 (1)	Ryushi Yanagisawa	Decision (unanimous)	RINGS: World Title Series 1	April 20, 2001	2	5:00	Tokyo, Japan	
Win	24–4 (1)	Zane Frazier	Submission (armbar)	RINGS USA: Battle of Champions	March 17, 2001	1	1:34	Council Bluffs, Iowa, United States	
NC	23–4 (1)	Mark Robinson	NC (overturned)	UFC 30	February 23, 2001	1	3:27	Atlantic City, New Jersey, United States	Originally a KO win for Hoffman; overturned due to Hoffman failing drug test.
Loss	23–4	Magomedkhan Gamzatkhanov	Decision (unanimous)	Rings: King of Kings 2000 Block B	December 22, 2000	3	5:00	Osaka, Japan	
Win	23–3	Joop Kasteel	KO (punches)	Rings: King of Kings 2000 Block B	December 22, 2000	1	0:43	Osaka, Japan	
Win	22–3	Aaron Brink	TKO (submission to punches)	Rings USA: Rising Stars Final	September 30, 2000	1	1:34	Moline, Illinois, United States	
Win	21–3	Eric Pele	Decision (unanimous)	Rings USA: Rising Stars Final	September 30, 2000	3	5:00	Moline, Illinois, United States	
Loss	20–3	Maurice Smith	Decision (majority)	UFC 27	September 22, 2000	3	5:00	New Orleans, Louisiana, United States	
Win	20–2	Greg Wikan	TKO (knees)	EC 36: Extreme Challenge 36	August 26, 2000	1	3:43	Davenport, Iowa, United States	
Win	19–2	Aaron Brink	Submission (neck crank)	Rings USA: Rising Stars Block A	July 15, 2000	1	3:12	Orem, Utah, United States	
Win	18–2	Victor Burtsev	TKO (punches)	Rings USA: Rising Stars Block A	July 15, 2000	1	3:13	Orem, Utah, United States	
Win	17–2	Sam Adkins	TKO (doctor stoppage)	Extreme Challenge 35	June 29, 2000	1	2:25	Davenport, Iowa, United States	
Win	16–2	Alistair Overeem	KO (lariat)	Rings: Millennium Combine 2	June 15, 2000	1	9:39	Tokyo, Japan	
Win	15–2	Kerry Schall	Decision (unanimous)	WEF 9: World Class	May 13, 2000	4	3:00	Evansville, Indiana, United States	
Win	14–2	Borislav Jeliazkov	KO (punch)	Rings: Millennium Combine 1	April 20, 2000	1	8:00	Tokyo, Japan	
Win	13–2	Zaza Tkeshelashvili	KO (punch)	Rings: King of Kings 1999 Final	February 26, 2000	1	0:34	Tokyo, Japan	
Win	12–2	Alex Paz	TKO (submission to punches)	WEF 8: Goin' Platinum	January 15, 2000	2	1:39	Rome, Georgia, United States	
Win	11–2	Paul Wells	TKO	CC 5: Cage Combat 5	October 24, 1999	1	12:51	Burlington, Iowa, United States	
Loss	10–2	Josh Barnett	Decision (unanimous)	SuperBrawl 13	September 7, 1999	3	5:00	Honolulu, Hawaii, United States	SuperBrawl 13 Heavyweight Tournament Finals.
Win	10–1	Heath Herring	Decision (unanimous)	SuperBrawl 13	September 7, 1999	2	5:00	Honolulu, Hawaii, United States	SuperBrawl 13 Heavyweight Tournament Semifinals.
Win	9–1	Ricco Rodriguez	KO (punches)	SuperBrawl 13	September 7, 1999	1	3:13	Honolulu, Hawaii, United States	SuperBrawl 13 Heavyweight Tournament Quarterfinals.
Win	8–1	Tommy Sauer	Submission (guillotine choke)	Extreme Challenge 27	August 21, 1999	1	4:46	Davenport, Iowa, United States	
Win	7–1	Ahmad Ahmad	TKO (punches)	Extreme Challenge 27	August 21, 1999	1	1:14	Davenport, Iowa, United States	
Win	6–1	Theo Brooks	TKO (exhaustion)	Cage Combat 2	May 30, 1999	1	7:47	Ottumwa, Iowa, United States	
Win	5–1	Rocky Batastini	Decision (unanimous)	Extreme Challenge 24	May 15, 1999	1	1:12	Salt Lake City, Utah, United States	
Win	4–1	Joe Campenella	Submission (keylock)	Extreme Challenge 24	May 15, 1999	1	1:12	Salt Lake City, Utah, United States	
Win	3–1	Mark Tullius	TKO (submission to punches)	Extreme Challenge 20	August 22, 1998	1	11:55	Davenport, Iowa, United States	
Win	2–1	Brad Jones	TKO (referee stoppage)	Extreme Challenge 16	March 26, 1998	1	7:22	Council Bluffs, Iowa, United States	
Loss	1–1	Mike Delaney	Decision	RnB 2: Bare Knuckle Brawl	February 20, 1998	1	15:00	Atlanta, Georgia, United States	
Win	1–0	Rick Graveson	TKO (submission to punches)	RnB 2: Bare Knuckle Brawl	February 20, 1998	1	3:00	Atlanta, Georgia, United States	
