= Jason Lambert =

American mixed martial arts fighter

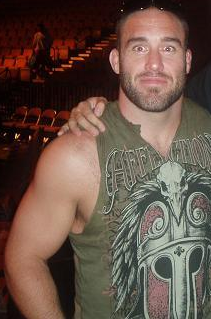
- Born: September 23, 1977 (age 49); Long Beach, California, United States
- Other names: The Punisher
- Height: 5 ft 10 in (1.78 m)
- Weight: 205 lb (93 kg; 14 st 9 lb)
- Division: Heavyweight; Light Heavyweight; Middleweight
- Reach: 72 in (180 cm)
- Fighting out of: Victorville, California, United States
- Team: Alliance MMA
- Rank: 3rd degree black belt in Brazilian Jiu-Jitsu
- Years active: 2001–2013

Mixed martial arts record
- Total: 39
- Wins: 26
- By knockout: 16
- By submission: 6
- By decision: 4
- Losses: 13
- By knockout: 7
- By submission: 3
- By decision: 3

Other information
- Mixed martial arts record from Sherdog

Jason L. Lambert (born September 23, 1977) is a retired American mixed martial artist. A professional from 2001 until 2013, he competed for the UFC, WEC, Bellator, King of the Cage, and AFC. He is the former WEC light heavyweight champion.

== Mixed martial arts career ==
=== World Extreme Cagefighting ===
Lambert made his WEC debut facing Matt Horwich at WEC 12: Halloween Fury 3 on October 21, 2004. He won his debut via submission (punches) in the second round. He then faced Richard Montoya at WEC 13 on January 22, 2005, for the vacant WEC Light Heavyweight Championship. He won the fight via submission (punches).

=== Ultimate Fighting Championship ===
Lambert made his debut in the UFC at UFC 58: USA vs. Canada as a late replacement for The Ultimate Fighter 2 cast member Seth Petruzelli, who suffered a concussion while training and had to withdraw from the bout. Lambert's debut was successful, submitting his opponent, Rob MacDonald, early in the first round.

Lambert fought again at UFC 59, defeating Terry Martin by technical knockout at 2:37 of round two. This was a preliminary fight that did not air on the pay-per-view broadcast. His next fight, against Branden Lee Hinkle at Ultimate Fight Night 5, marked Lambert's third consecutive UFC victory. Despite this initial win streak, he was not seen on a live UFC pay-per-view broadcast until UFC 63, where he lost to Rashad Evans by knockout in the second round. At UFC 68, Lambert defeated veteran and former title challenger Renato "Babalu" Sobral in a stunning upset by second-round knockout.

Lambert was scheduled to fight Wilson Gouveia at UFC 76: Knockout, but the bout was rescheduled to UFC 80: Rapid Fire after Gouveia suffered an injury in training. Lambert was knocked out by Gouveia by a left hook which, ironically, was identitical to the hook used by Lambert in his last fight to finish Renato Sobral.

Lambert then lost at UFC 85: Bedlam via TKO at the hands of Luiz Cané at 2:07 of the first round. Lambert moved down to the Middleweight division, and fought Canadian Jason MacDonald at UFC 88: Breakthrough in Atlanta, Georgia, on September 6, 2008. He lost by rear-naked choke in the second round.

After the loss to MacDonald that marked his third straight defeat, the UFC has released Lambert from his contract, saying that he "needed to get more wins".

=== Post-UFC ===
In his first bout after his release from the UFC, Lambert lost a unanimous decision to Vladimir Matyushenko at Call to Arms I on May 16, 2009.

Lambert then faced Matt Horwich, at AMMA 1 - First Blood, on October 24, 2009. He lost the fight via split decision, posting a record of 0-2 since leaving the UFC.

He then fought twice in the C3 Fights promotion, defeating Dominic Brown and Wayne Cole by TKO and rear-naked choke submission respectively. The two wins in the promotion marked his first win streak since 2006.

=== Bellator MMA ===
Lambert signed with Bellator MMA and made his debut against former UFC veteran Hector Ramirez at Bellator 85. Lambert won the bout via armbar submission. He then faced Tom DeBlass at Bellator 108 on November 15, 2013. Lambert lost the fight via first-round KO.

== Championships and accomplishments ==
- Icon Sport
  - SuperBrawl 24: Return of the Heavyweights Tournament Semifinals
- Ultimate Fighting Championship
  - Fight of the Night (One time) vs. Renato Sobral
  - Knockout of the Night (One time) vs. Renato Sobral
- World Extreme Cagefighting
  - WEC Light Heavyweight Championship (One time)

== Mixed martial arts record ==
Professional record breakdown
39 matches	26 wins	13 losses
By knockout	16	7
By submission	6	3
By decision	4	3

Res.	Record	Opponent	Method	Event	Date	Round	Time	Location	Notes
Loss	26–13	Tom DeBlass	KO (punch)	Bellator 108	November 15, 2013	1	1:45	Atlantic City, New Jersey, United States	
Win	26–12	Hector Ramirez	Submission (straight armbar)	Bellator 85	January 17, 2013	1	3:59	Irvine, California, United States	
Loss	25–12	Tony Lopez	KO (knee)	Powerhouse World Promotions: War on the Mainland	August 14, 2010	2	1:49	Irvine, California, United States	For the Powerhouse World Promotions Light Heavyweight Championship.
Win	25–11	Wayne Cole	Submission (rear-naked choke)	C3 Knockout: Rockout Weekend 3	June 19, 2010	2	1:51	Concho, Oklahoma, United States	
Win	24–11	Dominic Brown	TKO (punches)	C3 Knockout: Rockout Weekend 2	April 17, 2010	1	2:41	Clinton, Oklahoma, United States	
Loss	23–11	Matt Horwich	Decision (split)	AMMA 1: First Blood	October 24, 2009	3	5:00	Edmonton, Alberta, Canada	Middleweight bout.
Loss	23–10	Vladimir Matyushenko	Decision (unanimous)	Call to Arms I	May 16, 2009	3	5:00	Ontario, California, United States	
Loss	23–9	Jason MacDonald	Submission (rear-naked choke)	UFC 88	September 6, 2008	2	1:20	Atlanta, Georgia, United States	Middleweight bout.
Loss	23–8	Luiz Cané	TKO (punches)	UFC 85	June 7, 2008	1	2:07	London, England	
Loss	23–7	Wilson Gouveia	KO (punch)	UFC 80	January 19, 2008	2	0:37	Newcastle, England	
Win	23–6	Renato Sobral	KO (punch)	UFC 68	March 3, 2007	2	3:26	Columbus, Ohio, United States	Fight of the Night. Knockout of the Night.
Loss	22–6	Rashad Evans	KO (punches)	UFC 63	September 23, 2006	2	2:22	Anaheim, California, United States	
Win	22–5	Branden Lee Hinkle	TKO (referee stoppage)	UFC Fight Night 5	June 28, 2006	1	5:00	Las Vegas, Nevada, United States	
Win	21–5	Terry Martin	TKO (punches)	UFC 59	April 15, 2006	2	2:37	Anaheim, California, United States	
Win	20–5	Rob MacDonald	Submission (kimura)	UFC 58	March 4, 2006	1	1:54	Las Vegas, Nevada, United States	
Win	19–5	Travis Wiuff	KO (punches)	FFC 15: Fiesta Las Vegas	September 14, 2005	1	3:19	Las Vegas, Nevada, United States	
Win	18–5	Marvin Eastman	Decision (split)	KOTC: Mortal Sins	May 7, 2005	3	5:00	Primm, Nevada, United States	
Win	17–5	Richard Montoya	TKO (submission to punches)	WEC 13: Heavyweight Explosion	January 22, 2005	1	2:45	Lemoore, California, United States	Won the WEC Light Heavyweight Championship.
Win	16–5	Matt Horwich	TKO (submission to punches)	WEC 12: Halloween Fury 3	October 21, 2004	2	3:28	Lemoore, California, United States	
Win	15–5	Mike Rogers	TKO (punches)	ROTR 5: Rumble on the Rock 5	May 7, 2004	1	3:29	Honolulu, Hawaii, United States	
Loss	14–5	Chael Sonnen	Decision (unanimous)	GC 20: Gladiator Challenge 20	November 13, 2003	3	5:00	Colusa, California, United States	
Win	14–4	Brian Foster	Decision (unanimous)	KOTC 25: Flaming Fury	June 29, 2003	2	5:00	San Jacinto, California. United States	
Win	13–4	Allan Sullivan	TKO (punches)	GC 16: Gladiator Challenge 16	June 1, 2003	1	N/A	Colusa, California, United States	Return to Light Heavyweight.
Win	12–4	Jim Breech	TKO (punches)	KOTC 22: Steel Warrior	March 23, 2003	1	1:35	San Jacinto, California, United States	Middleweight debut.
Win	11–4	Rick Collup	TKO (submission to punches)	GC 14: Gladiator Challenge 14	February 16, 2003	1	1:28	Porterville, California, United States	Heavyweight bout.
Loss	10–4	Wesley Correira	KO	SB 27: SuperBrawl 27	November 9, 2002	2	1:48	Honolulu, Hawaii, United States	Heavyweight bout. For the ICON Sport Heavyweight Championship.
Win	10–3	Joshua Hoag	TKO (punches)	KOTC 17: Nuclear Explosion	October 19, 2002	1	1:25	San Jacinto, California, United States	
Win	9–3	Dan Quinn	Decision	GC 12: Gladiator Challenge 12	September 8, 2002	3	5:00	Colusa, California, United States	
Win	8–3	Lobo Lobo	TKO (punches)	KOTC 15: Bad Intentions	June 22, 2002	1	3:01	San Jacinto, California, United States	Return to Light Heavyweight.
Loss	7–3	Tim Sylvia	TKO (doctor stoppage)	SB 24: Return of the Heavyweights 2	April 27, 2002	2	4:13	Honolulu, Hawaii, United States	SuperBrawl 24: Return of the Heavyweights Semifinals.
Win	6–3	Brian Stromberg	Submission (forearm choke)	SB 24: Return of the Heavyweights 2	April 27, 2002	2	4:59	Honolulu, Hawaii, United States	SuperBrawl 24: Return of the Heavyweights Quarterfinals.
Win	6–2	Ron Faircloth	Decision (unanimous)	SB 24: Return of the Heavyweights 1	April 26, 2002	2	5:00	Honolulu, Hawaii, United States	SuperBrawl 24: Return of the Heavyweights First Round.
Win	5–2	Jason Jones	TKO (punches)	KOTC 12: Cold Blood	February 9, 2002	2	1:17	San Jacinto, California, United States	Light Heavyweight bout.
Win	4–2	Kauai Kupihea	Submission (choke)	GC 8: School Yard Brawls	November 17, 2001	2	2:03	California, United States	
Loss	3–2	Marco Ruas	Submission (heel hook)	UP 1: Ultimate Pankration 1	November 11, 2001	1	0:56	Cabazon, California, United States	
Loss	3–1	Kim Jong Wang	Submission (guillotine choke)	KOTC 11: Domination	September 29, 2001	1	0:55	San Jacinto, California, United States	Return to Heavyweight.
Win	3–0	Rick Mathis	TKO (punches)	KOTC 9: Showtime	June 23, 2001	1	4:30	San Jacinto, California, United States	Light Heavyweight debut.
Win	2–0	Adrian Perez	TKO (punches)	GC 3: Showdown at Soboba	April 7, 2001	1	1:07	Friant, California, United States	
Win	1–0	Jorge Lavama	Submission (keylock)	GC 2: Collision at Colusa	February 18, 2001	1	3:45	Colusa, California, United States	

Vacant Title last held by Frank Shamrock	2nd WEC Light Heavyweight Champion; January 22, 2005 – October, 2005	Vacant Lambert signed with UFC Title next held by Scott Smith
