= Eric Pele =

American martial artist

- Born: October 21, 1969 (age 56); San Francisco, California, United States
- Other names: Big E
- Height: 6 ft 2 in (188 cm)
- Weight: 340 lb (154 kg; 24 st 4 lb)
- Division: Super Heavyweight; Heavyweight
- Stance: Orthodox
- Fighting out of: Las Vegas, Nevada, United States
- Team: Pele Fight Team; Xtreme Couture
- Rank: Purple belt in Brazilian Jiu-Jitsu
- Years active: 2000–2008

Mixed martial arts record
- Total: 16
- Wins: 11
- By knockout: 7
- By submission: 2
- By decision: 2
- Losses: 5
- By knockout: 2
- By decision: 3

Other information
- Mixed martial arts record from Sherdog

Eric Pele (born October 21, 1969) is a retired American mixed martial artist of Samoan descent and former King of the Cage Super Heavyweight Champion. Pele is also an accomplished tattoo artist who has appeared on the reality television shows "Inked" and "Tattoo Nightmare", with the latter appearing on Spike TV, using the nickname 'Big E'. He has competed in various mixed martial arts organizations including RINGS, MFC, and King of the Cage.

== Mixed martial arts career ==
=== Early career ===
Pele made his professional debut in 2000 at the RINGS USA Heavyweight Tournament, defeating Wesley Correira (also making his pro debut) via submission. In the semifinal bout, Pele defeated Roger Neff via decision. In the final, Pele faced then 20-3 Bobby Hoffman. Pele was handed his first professional loss via decision.

=== King of the Cage ===
After three more wins, Pele faced Dan Bobish in the main event at KOTC: Cold Blood for the Super Heavyweight title. Pele was defeated after his corner stopped the fight in the second round.

In 2003, Pele fought again for the title against Dan Christison. Pele won the King of the Cage Super Heavyweight title via first-round TKO.

In his first title defense, Pele defeated Travis Fulton via first-round submission. In 2005, Pele returned to defend his title in a rematch with Bobby Hoffman. Pele avenged his first career loss and title via second-round TKO. Pele was later stripped of the title due to inactivity, and fought Vince Lucero in October 2006, winning via decision.

=== BodogFIGHT ===
Pele was signed by Bodog and slated to face Antonio Silva for BodogFIGHT on December 2, 2006. Pele handed the future UFC title challenger his first professional loss via TKO. After his win over Silva, Pele next faced Alexander Emelianenko on April 14, 2007. Pele was defeated via first-round stoppage. After a win in the regional circuit, Pele returned to Bodog, losing via decision to Akhmed Sultanov.

=== Maximum Fighting Championship ===
Pele last competed professionally in May 2008 against Chase Gormley. Pele was defeated via unanimous decision.

== Championships and accomplishments ==
- King of the Cage
  - KOTC Super Heavyweight Championship (Two times)
    - One successful title defense
- Fighting Network RINGS
  - 2000 Rising Stars Heavyweight Tournament Runner-up

== Mixed martial arts record ==
Professional record breakdown
16 matches	11 wins	5 losses
By knockout	7	2
By submission	2	0
By decision	2	3

Res.	Record	Opponent	Method	Event	Date	Round	Time	Location	Notes
Loss	11–5	Chase Gormley	Decision (unanimous)	MFC 16: Anger Management	May 9, 2008	3	5:00	N/A	
Loss	11–4	Akhmet Sultanov	Decision (unanimous)	BodogFIGHT: USA vs. Russia	November 30, 2007	3	5:00	N/A	
Win	11–3	Antoine Hayes	TKO	IFO: Kimmons vs Yunker	September 21, 2007	1	2:00	N/A	
Loss	10–3	Alexander Emelianenko	KO (punch)	BodogFIGHT: Clash of the Nations	August 25, 2007	1	4:07	N/A	
Win	10–2	Antônio Silva	TKO (punches and elbows)	BodogFIGHT: USA vs Russia	December 2, 2006	1	2:40	N/A	
Win	9–2	Vince Lucero	Decision (unanimous)	Extreme Wars 5	October 6, 2006	3	5:00	N/A	
Win	8–2	Bobby Hoffman	TKO	KOTC: Mortal Sins	May 7, 2005	2	2:55	N/A	Won the vacant KOTC Super Heavyweight Championship.
Win	7–2	Travis Fulton	Submission (verbal)	KOTC 32: Bringing Heat	January 24, 2004	1	1:35	N/A	Defended the KOTC Super Heavyweight Championship.
Win	6–2	Dan Christison	TKO	KOTC 23: Sin City	May 16, 2003	1	4:50	N/A	Won the vacant KOTC Super Heavyweight Championship.
Loss	5–2	Dan Bobish	TKO (corner stoppage)	KOTC 12: Cold Blood	February 9, 2002	2	1:10	N/A	For the vacant KOTC Super Heavyweight Championship.
Win	5–1	Kauai Kupihea	TKO (submission to strikes)	KOTC 11: Domination	September 29, 2001	1	1:40	N/A	
Win	4–1	Sean Alvarez	KO	KOTC 9: Showtime	June 23, 2001	3	0:27	N/A	
Win	3–1	Ernest Henderson	TKO (submission to punches)	GC 1: Gladiator Challenge 1	December 9, 2000	N/A	N/A	N/A	
Loss	2–1	Bobby Hoffman	Decision (unanimous)	RINGS USA: Rising Stars Final	September 30, 2000	3	5:00	N/A	RINGS Heavyweight Tournament Final.
Win	2–0	Roger Neff	Decision (unanimous)	RINGS: King of Kings 2000 Block B	July 22, 2000	2	5:00	N/A	RINGS Heavyweight Tournament Semifinal.
Win	1–0	Wesley Correira	Submission (armbar)	RINGS: King of Kings 2000 Block B	July 22, 2000	2	2:30	N/A	RINGS Heavyweight Tournament Quarterfinal.
