= Joey Villaseñor =

American mixed martial arts fighter

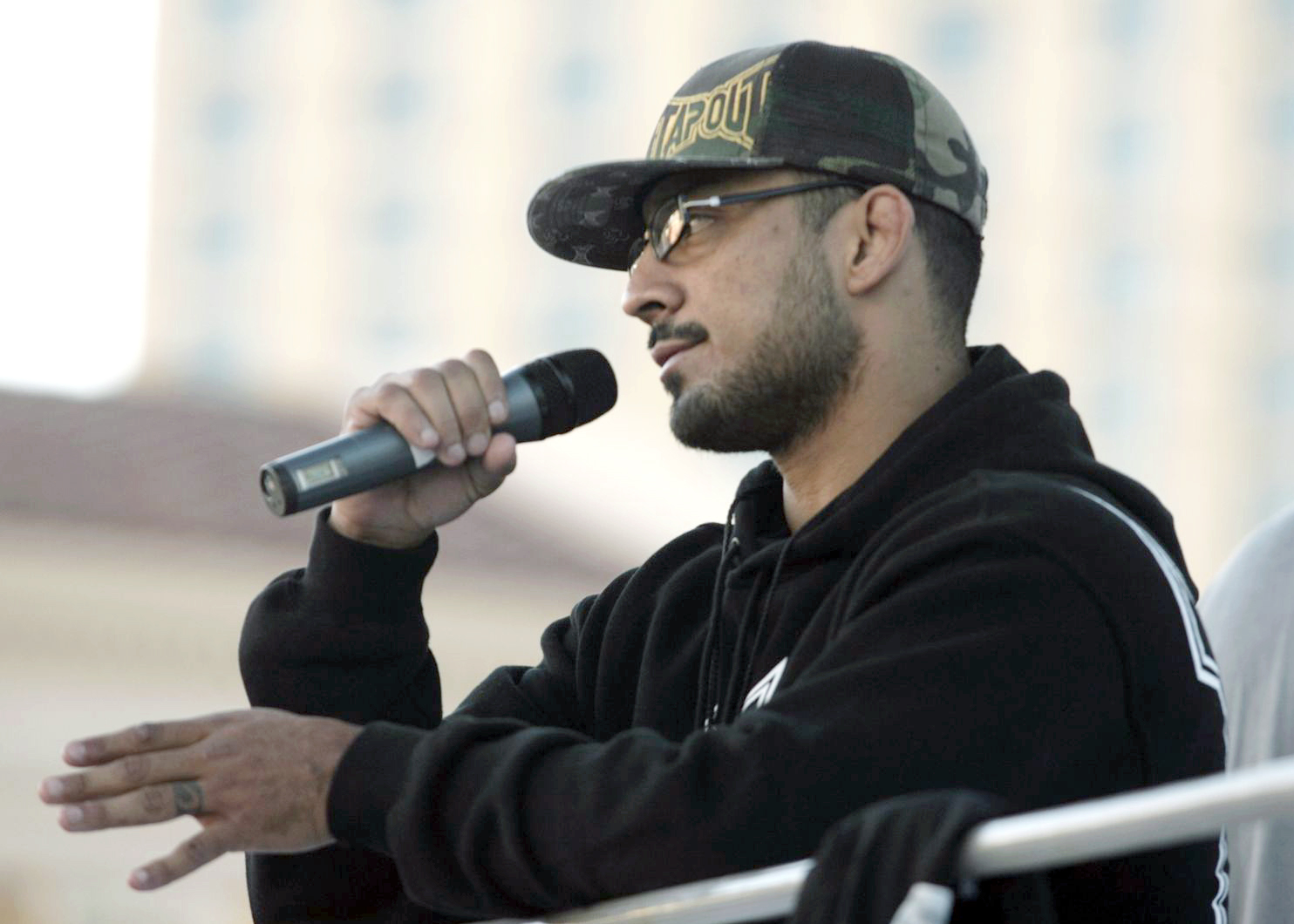
- Joey Villaseñor in 2006
- Born: Joey Simon Villaseñor; October 17, 1975 (age 51); Los Angeles, California, United States
- Other names: Smokin'
- Height: 5 ft 11 in (1.80 m)
- Weight: 170 lb (77 kg; 12 st)
- Division: Middleweight; Welterweight
- Reach: 72 in (183 cm)
- Style: MMA, Submission wrestling, Brazilian jiu-jitsu, Boxing
- Stance: Orthodox
- Fighting out of: Albuquerque, New Mexico, United States
- Team: Jackson's Submission Fighting
- Years active: 1999–2012

Mixed martial arts record
- Total: 39
- Wins: 29
- By knockout: 18
- By submission: 5
- By decision: 6
- Losses: 10
- By knockout: 5
- By submission: 1
- By decision: 4

Other information
- Mixed martial arts record from Sherdog

Joey Simon Villaseñor (born October 17, 1975) is an American former professional mixed martial artist. A professional competitor from 1999 until 2012, Villasenor competed for the PRIDE Fighting Championships, Strikeforce, EliteXC, King of the Cage, DEEP, Shark Fights, BAMMA, and the World Fighting Alliance. Villasenor is the former King of the Cage Middleweight Champion, and defended this title seven times before vacating it to sign with PRIDE.

== Background ==
Villasenor was born in East Los Angeles and lived there for the first nine years of his life before moving to New Mexico in 1984. He graduated from Farmington High School but also attended West Mesa High School in Albuquerque, New Mexico. Villasenor was athletic and in high school he played baseball, football, and participated in track and field. Villasenor first began watching UFC events when he was 17 or 18 years old, but thought that the fighting was brutal, although he wanted to learn self-defense. He began competing in martial arts when he was 19 years old, training in Brazilian jiu-jitsu and boxing. He was a four-time Amateur Regional Boxing Champion with a 16–0 record, and 15 wins by KO.

== Mixed martial arts career ==
=== Early career ===
Villaseñor made his professional debut in April 1999 and after 15 consecutive wins, he was signed by the PRIDE Fighting Championships.

=== PRIDE ===
Villasenor made his PRIDE debut on June 4, 2006, against Japanese veteran, Ryo Chonan. Despite losing a decision, Villaseñor was brought back by the organization to fight UFC veteran Robbie Lawler at PRIDE 32. He lost via knockout only 22 seconds into the first round due to a flying knee.

=== EliteXC ===
Villasenor then signed with EliteXC. He defeated former UFC veteran David Loiseau in EliteXC's inaugural event, and lost to Murilo Rua at the EliteXC co-promotion Strikeforce Shamrock vs. Baroni, and rebounded with a win over Riki Fukuda at EliteXC: Uprising. Villasenor scored an impressive knockout over Ryan Jensen at Strikeforce: Shamrock vs. Le. On May, 31st, at EliteXC's Saturday Night Fights, Villaseñor won his bout against Phil Baroni. This bout can potentially be the elimination match for the EliteXC Middleweight Championship. It was recently announced that Villaseñor would receive a title shot in a rematch against Robbie Lawler on the scheduled November 8, 2008, EliteXC show. However ProElite canceled the show shortly after due to large amounts of debt.

=== Strikeforce ===
After the demise of EliteXC, Villasenor was signed by Strikeforce and defeated Evangelista Santos at Strikeforce Challengers: Villasenor vs. Cyborg via split decision.

Villaseñor faced Ronaldo Souza on May 15, 2010, at Strikeforce: Heavy Artillery. He lost the fight via decision.

On December 9, 2010, Villaseñor was released from Strikeforce, along with Joe Riggs.

=== Shark Fights ===
Villaseñor was expected to face Drew McFedries on September 11, 2010, at Shark Fights 13 but McFedries was forced off the card with an injury. He instead faced Danillo Villefort and lost the fight via unanimous decision.

Villaseñor next faced Chris Camozzi at Shark Fights 15. The fight was initially ruled a draw, but was subsequently overturned and counted as a win for Camozzi by the New Mexico Athletic Commission when it was revealed one of the judges scores was added incorrectly.

=== BAMMA ===
Villaseñor made his BAMMA debut against fighter Jim Wallhead at BAMMA 8. He lost the fight via KO in the first round.

== Championships and Accomplishments ==
- King of the Cage
  - KOTC Middleweight Championship (One time)

== Mixed martial arts record ==
Professional record breakdown
39 matches	29 wins	10 losses
By knockout	18	5
By submission	5	1
By decision	6	4

Res.	Record	Opponent	Method	Event	Date	Round	Time	Location	Notes
Win	29–10	Donnie Liles	Decision (unanimous)	Jackson's MMA Series 8	June 2, 2012	3	5:00	Albuquerque, New Mexico, United States	
Loss	28–10	Jim Wallhead	KO (punches)	BAMMA 8: Manuwa vs. Rea	December 10, 2011	1	0:48	Nottingham, England	
Win	28–9	Chuck Parmelee	TKO (punches)	Jackson's MMA Series 6	October 22, 2011	1	2:47	Albuquerque, New Mexico, United States	Welterweight debut.
Loss	27–9	Chris Camozzi	Decision (split)	Shark Fights 15: Villaseñor vs Camozzi	May 27, 2011	3	5:00	Rio Rancho, New Mexico, United States	Originally split draw, result later overturned.
Loss	27–8	Danillo Villefort	Decision (unanimous)	Shark Fights 13: Jardine vs Prangley	September 11, 2010	3	5:00	Amarillo, Texas, United States	
Loss	27–7	Ronaldo Souza	Decision (unanimous)	Strikeforce: Heavy Artillery	May 15, 2010	3	5:00	St. Louis, Missouri, United States	
Win	27–6	Evangelista Santos	Decision (split)	Strikeforce Challengers: Villasenor vs. Cyborg	June 19, 2009	3	5:00	Kent, Washington, United States	
Win	26–6	Phil Baroni	TKO (punches)	EliteXC: Primetime	May 31, 2008	1	1:11	Newark, New Jersey, United States	
Win	25–6	Ryan Jensen	KO (punch)	Strikeforce: Shamrock vs. Le	March 29, 2008	1	4:45	San Jose, California, United States	
Win	24–6	Riki Fukuda	Decision (split)	EliteXC: Uprising	September 15, 2007	3	5:00	Honolulu, Hawaii, United States	
Loss	23–6	Murilo Rua	TKO (punches)	Strikeforce: Shamrock vs. Baroni	June 22, 2007	2	1:05	San Jose, California, United States	For the EliteXC Middleweight Championship.
Win	23–5	David Loiseau	Decision (unanimous)	EliteXC: Destiny	February 10, 2007	3	5:00	Southaven, Mississippi, United States	
Loss	22–5	Robbie Lawler	KO (flying knee)	PRIDE 32	October 21, 2006	1	0:22	Las Vegas, Nevada, United States	
Win	22–4	John Cronk	TKO	KOTC: Civil War	July 29, 2006	1	4:04	Towaoc, Colorado, United States	Defended the KOTC Middleweight Championship.
Loss	21–4	Ryo Chonan	Decision (split)	PRIDE: Bushido 11	June 4, 2006	2	5:00	Saitama, Saitama, Japan	PRIDE 2006 Welterweight Grand Prix Opening Round
Win	21–3	Yuya Shirai	Decision (unanimous)	DEEP: 24 Impact	April 11, 2006	2	5:00	Tokyo, Japan	
Win	20–3	Kyacey Uscola	TKO (doctor stoppage)	KOTC: Anarchy	February 11, 2006	2	4:14	Prince George, British Columbia, Canada	Defended the KOTC Middleweight Championship.
Win	19–3	Jorge Santiago	Decision (unanimous)	KOTC 58: Prime Time	August 5, 2005	3	5:00	San Jacinto, California, United States	Defended the KOTC Middleweight Championship.
Win	18–3	Damien Riccio	KO (punches)	KOTC: Warzone	June 24, 2005	1	1:55	Sheffield, England	Defended the KOTC Middleweight Championship.
Win	17–3	Michael Gonzalez	Submission (choke)	KOTC 55: Grudge Match	June 17, 2005	1	1:05	Albuquerque, New Mexico, United States	Defended the KOTC Middleweight Championship.
Win	16–3	Brendan Seguin	TKO (stoppage)	KOTC 48: Payback	February 25, 2005	1	2:10	Cleveland, Ohio, United States	Defended the KOTC Middleweight Championship.
Win	15–3	Jorge Ortiz	TKO (submission to strikes)	KOTC: Hostile Takeover	December 4, 2004	1	3:19	Acoma, New Mexico, United States	Defended the KOTC Middleweight Championship.
Win	14–3	Brian Foster	Submission (rear-naked choke)	KOTC 41: Relentless	September 29, 2004	1	4:25	San Jacinto, California, United States	Won the vacant KOTC Middleweight Championship.
Win	13–3	Hank Weis	KO (punch)	KOTC: New Mexico	August 28, 2004	1	0:05	Albuquerque, New Mexico, United States	
Win	12–3	Danny Higgins	TKO (submission to elbows)	XFC 4: Australia vs. The World	March 19, 2004	1	2:42	Queensland, Australia	
Win	11–3	Art Santore	TKO (cut)	KOTC 30: The Pinnacle	November 2, 2003	2	0:31	Los Angeles, California, United States	
Win	10–3	James Fanshier	Submission (rear-naked choke)	KOTC 28: More Punishment	August 16, 2003	2	2:26	Reno, Nevada, United States	
Win	9–3	Joe Merit	TKO	KOTC 24: Mayhem	June 14, 2003	1	4:06	Albuquerque, New Mexico, United States	
Win	8–3	Tony Galindo	TKO (corner stoppage)	KOTC 21: Invasion	February 21, 2003	1	5:00	Albuquerque, New Mexico, United States	
Win	7–3	Lorn Estes	TKO (submission to punches)	KOTC 20: Crossroads	December 15, 2002	1	1:43	Bernalillo, New Mexico, United States	
Loss	6–3	Jermaine Andre	TKO (foot injury)	WFA 2: Level 2	July 5, 2002	1	0:21	Las Vegas, Nevada, United States	
Win	6–2	Todd Carney	Submission (choke)	KOTC 14: 5150	June 19, 2002	1	1:47	Bernalillo, New Mexico, United States	
Win	5–2	Tim Credeur	TKO (submission to punches)	KOTC 13: Revolution	May 17, 2002	2	3:24	Reno, Nevada, United States	
Win	4–2	Eddy Rolon	TKO (cut)	Warriors Challenge 12	April 11, 2001	1	7:30	Friant, California, United States	
Win	3–2	Allan Mollring	TKO (punches)	Warriors Challenge 11	January 13, 2001	1	3:27	Fresno, California, United States	
Loss	2–2	David Terrell	Submission (armbar)	Warriors Challenge 9	July 18, 2000	1	2:24	Friant, California, United States	
Win	2–1	Gabriel Duran	Submission (choke)	Warriors Challenge 6	March 25, 2000	1	2:31	Friant, California, United States	
Loss	1–1	Adam Ryan	KO (punch)	WVF: Casper	October 9, 1999	2	5:00	Casper, Wyoming, United States	
Win	1–0	Shane Schartzer	TKO (submission to punches)	WVF: Durango	April 17, 1999	1	1:12	Durango, Colorado, United States	

== See also ==
- List of male mixed martial artists
