= Dan Bobish =

American martial artist

- Born: Daniel Emerson Bobish; January 26, 1970 (age 56); Brooklyn, New York, U.S.
- Other names: The Bull
- Height: 6 ft 1 in (185 cm)
- Weight: 332 lb (151 kg; 23 st 10 lb)
- Division: Super Heavyweight; Heavyweight
- Stance: Orthodox
- Fighting out of: Cleveland, Ohio, U.S.
- Team: Strong Style Fight Team
- Wrestling: NCAA Division III Champion
- Years active: 1996-1997, 2001-2007 (MMA)

Mixed martial arts record
- Total: 26
- Wins: 17
- By knockout: 10
- By submission: 7
- Losses: 9
- By knockout: 6
- By submission: 3

Other information
- University: Mt. Union College
- Mixed martial arts record from Sherdog

Daniel Emerson Bobish (/ˈboʊbɪʃ/ BOH-bish; born January 26, 1970) is a retired American mixed martial artist and professional wrestler. He was competing in the Super Heavyweight (no limit) division. He is a former King of the Cage Super Heavyweight Champion. Bobish has fought in many MMA organizations including PRIDE Fighting Championships, the Ultimate Fighting Championship, Gladiator Challenge and King of the Cage. His fights typically did not go past the first round with the average length of his fights being 2:43.

== Background ==
Born in Brooklyn, New York and raised in Cleveland, Ohio, Bobish was an all-state wrestler and played football at Maple Heights High School before competing at Cuyahoga Community College, where he was a NCJAA All-American. Bobish later transferred to the University of Mount Union, where in two seasons he went 58-2 and was the 1992 NCAA Division III National Champion at 275 lb during his senior season. He was also a two-time All-American for 1991 and 1992. Bobish also played football as a defensive tackle for one season at Mount Union, and later had a tryout with the Cleveland Browns. After failing, he started to work as a bouncer at the Beach club, where he gained a reputation as a fighter. He claimed, "I never got beat one-on-one in a fight. Even two-on-one."

== Mixed martial arts career ==
Bobish became interested in mixed martial arts by suggestions of friends in the bar where he bounced, The Flats, in which Ultimate Fighting Championships events were commonly ordered. He contacted UFC mainstay Dan Severn, who came from a similar wrestling background, and was recruited to fight in Brazil.

=== Universal Vale Tudo Fighting ===
Bobish made his professional debut on October 22, 1996 in Brazil at the Universal Vale Tudo Fighting 4 Heavyweight tournament. He first faced Brazilian jiu-jitsu fighter Mauro Bernardo, whom Bobish defeated in a first-round submission by taking him down and choking him with his forearm. The American would find another wrestler and UFC veteran in the second round, Dave Beneteau, but Bobish controlled the bout with a guillotine choke with several strikes, eventually getting the win by a cut. He then fought yet another wrestler and UFC veteran, fellow NCAA collegiate champion Kevin Randleman from Team Hammer House, for the final. Bobish controlled the first minutes from the clinch, attempting neck cranks and landing several punches, but Randleman escaped. The two then exchanged hard strikes, with Bobish getting the better of it, but Randleman scored a takedown and mounted him, from where he landed several strikes. Two of the hits dislocated Bobish's jaw, forcing him to give up.

After the defeat, he returned to United States and joined Severn's team full-time, training with him, Don Frye and shootfighting teacher Becky Levi.

Bobish returned at Vale Tudo Fighting 6 tournament, knocking out Ucimar Hypolito in six seconds in order to meet regarded Carlson Gracie's trainee Carlos Barreto in the semifinals. Again, the American wrestler controlled most of the bout, taking down and hitting ground and pound on Barreto via his superiority at the clinch. Controversy arose at one point, as Barreto's teammates Wallid Ismail and Murilo Bustamante claimed Bobish had tapped out in an armbar attempt by Barreto, while Hammer House stablemaster Mark Coleman pointed out Carlos was grabbing the ropes to avoid being taken down. In any case, minutes later Bobish started to show fatigue, and when he dove again in Barreto's guard to continue his ground and pound assault, he fell to a triangle choke submission.

=== Ultimate Fighting Championship ===
After his vale tudo tenure, Bobish debuted in Ultimate Fighting Championship in 1997, following the tenures of Severn and his other teammate Don Frye. He entered the UFC 14 heavyweight tournament, where he was placed against kickboxer and UFC veteran Brian Johnston. Although his opponent proved his field of expertise by momentarily stunning Bobish, the wrestler took him down, folded him against the fence and submitted him to a forearm choke. Bobish advanced round and met another Hammer House fighter, fellow former NCAA Division I champion Mark Kerr, who opened their match with effective leg kicks and a takedown scored. Bobish tried to escape, but Kerr held him down while hitting ground and pound, and ultimately jammed his chin into Bobish's eye to force him to give up.

=== King of the Cage ===
After moving to 6–3, Bobish fought Eric Pele at KOTC 12: Cold Blood for the vacant KOTC Super Heavyweight Championship. Bobish won after Pele's corner threw in the towel at 1:10 into the second round.

Bobish then defended his title against Mike Kyle, before losing it to Jimmy Ambriz at KOTC 16: Double Cross.

=== PRIDE Fighting Championships ===
Following his professional wrestling work in Japan in 2003, Bobish had his first MMA bout in Japan for event X-1, easily defeating Basil Castro. He was then brought to PRIDE Fighting Championships in November, pitted in PRIDE Final Conflict 2003 against renowned UFC and PRIDE veteran Gary Goodridge. However, the bout was short and controversial: having received an eye poke in the first striking exchange, Bobish stopped fighting and told the referee on the belief the match would be stopped for the ring doctor, but it wasn't, and Goodridge capitalized on the distraction to knock Bobish out.

Bobish returned at PRIDE 27 against feared Ukrainian striker Igor Vovchanchyn. The American scored an early takedown and mounted Vovchanchyn, initially looking for a neck crank and later seeking a keylock, while applying ground and pound during the process. Eventually Vovchanchyn regained guard, and action was restarted on the feet with a yellow card for Bobish due to a lapse of inactivity. Vovchanchyn then landed multiple strikes while on the feet, but Bobish managed to take him down again and achieve north/south position, ending the round with another submission attempt. At th second, however, Vovchanchyn controlled an already visibly tired Bobish with punches and knee strikes, and ultimately dropped him and mounted him for his own ground and pound. Devoid of energy, Bobish then submitted verbally.

Bobish then faced another renowned kickboxer in Mark Hunt at PRIDE 28 on October 31, 2004. Bobish scored a takedown and forced Hunt to turtle up, landing hammerfists and knee strikes and at one point even attempting a crossface hold on the kickboxer. However, the tough Hunt absorbed the damage and managed to escape to his feet. With Bobish showing signs of fatigue, Hunt forced him to surrender with an uppercut and a body kick.

=== Independent promotions ===
After his PRIDE run, Bobish returned to King of the Cage, and regional U.S. promotions. He went 8–2 in his final ten fights. He lost his last fight at Hardcore Championship Fighting: Title Wave against Alexander Emelianenko on October 19, 2007. During the fight Bobish blew out his L3 and L4 discs in his back, and made the decision to end his career rather than receive surgery.

== Professional wrestling ==
Bobish made his professional wrestling debut in March 2003 for Japanese promotion Fighting World of Japan, where he teamed up with his MMA training partner Don Frye to unsuccessfully face Kensuke Sasaki and Hiroshi Hase in their first match. Bobish then became a regular player, teaming up with Hase himself and other native wrestlers. A year later, he debuted for the HUSTLE promotion in Japan, appearing as part of Generalissimo Takada's Takada Monster Army, and occasionally wrestling as a representative in Pro Wrestling Zero-One. He had 22 total matches, nine of which were tag team. He also competed for three more years while simultaneously fighting in MMA.

== Personal life ==
Bobish now lives in his hometown of Cleveland and began promoting local fights in 2010 when he founded "Ultimate Cage Battles." Bobish was once a sparring partner and bodyguard for Mike Tyson. Bobish is married and has four children.

== Championships and accomplishments ==
=== Collegiate wrestling ===
- National Collegiate Athletic Association
  - 1992 NCAA Division III Wrestling Championships - 1st place, 275 lb
  - NCAA Division III Wrestling All-American (1991, 1992)

=== Mixed martial arts ===
- King of the Cage
  - KOTC Super Heavyweight Championship (One time)
    - One successful title defense
- Ultimate Fighting Championship
  - UFC 14 Heavyweight Tournament - runner-up
- Universal Vale Tudo Fighting
  - UVTF 4 Tournament - runner-up
  - UVTF 6 Tournament - semifinalist

== Mixed martial arts record ==
Professional record breakdown
26 matches	17 wins	9 losses
By knockout	10	6
By submission	7	3

Res.	Record	Opponent	Method	Event	Date	Round	Time	Location	Notes
Loss	17–9	Alexander Emelianenko	Submission (guillotine choke)	HCF: Title Wave	October 19, 2007	1	1:09	Calgary, Alberta, Canada	
Win	17–8	Nate Eddy	KO (punch)	NAAFS: Fight Night in the Flats III	June 9, 2007	1	1:00	Cleveland, Ohio, United States	
Win	16–8	Chris Clark	Submission (americana)	GFS: Seasons Beatings	December 2, 2006	1	1:24	Cleveland, Ohio, United States	
Win	15–8	Dan Evensen	TKO (submission to punches)	Xtreme Fight Series 2	October 14, 2006	1	1:25	Boise, Idaho, United States	
Win	14–8	Matt Eckerle	Submission (guillotine choke)	Fightfest 6	September 23, 2006	1	0:31	Corpus Christi, Texas, United States	
Win	13–8	Eric Knox	TKO (punches)	GFS: Fight Nite in the Flats 2	June 10, 2006	1	0:47	Cleveland, Ohio, United States	
Win	12–8	Chris Clark	Submission (armbar)	Fightfest 3	May 6, 2006	1	1:00	Youngstown, Ohio, United States	
Loss	11–8	Ben Rothwell	KO (knee)	GFC: Team Gracie vs Team Hammer House	March 3, 2006	1	4:20	Columbus, Ohio, United States	
Win	11–7	Joey Smith	TKO (submission to punches)	KOTC 64: Raging Bull	December 16, 2005	1	0:21	Cleveland, Ohio, United States	
Win	10–7	Ruben Villareal	TKO (punches)	KOTC 48: Payback	February 25, 2005	1	0:55	Cleveland, Ohio, United States	
Loss	9–7	Mark Hunt	TKO (body kick)	PRIDE 28	October 31, 2004	1	6:23	Saitama, Japan	
Loss	9–6	Igor Vovchanchyn	TKO (punches)	PRIDE 27	February 1, 2004	2	1:45	Osaka, Japan	
Loss	9–5	Gary Goodridge	TKO (punches)	PRIDE Final Conflict 2003	November 9, 2003	1	0:18	Tokyo, Japan	
Win	9–4	Basil Castro	TKO (punches)	X-1	September 6, 2003	1	1:33	Yokohama, Japan	
Loss	8–4	Jimmy Ambriz	TKO (submission to punches)	KOTC 16: Double Cross	August 2, 2002	1	0:46	San Jacinto, California, United States	Lost the KOTC Super Heavyweight Championship.
Win	8–3	Mike Kyle	TKO (submission to punches)	KOTC 13: Revolution	May 17, 2002	1	3:25	United States	Defended the KOTC Super Heavyweight Championship.
Win	7–3	Eric Pele	TKO (corner stoppage)	KOTC 12: Cold Blood	February 9, 2002	2	1:10	San Jacinto, California, United States	Won the vacant KOTC Super Heavyweight Championship.
Win	6–3	Brett Hogg	Submission (armbar)	RSF 5: New Blood Conflict	October 27, 2001	1	0:27	Augusta, Georgia, United States	
Loss	5–3	Mark Kerr	Submission (chin to the eye)	UFC 14	July 27, 1997	1	1:38	Birmingham, Alabama, United States	
Win	5–2	Brian Johnston	Submission (forearm choke)	UFC 14	July 27, 1997	1	2:10	Birmingham, Alabama, United States	
Loss	4–2	Carlos Barreto	Submission (triangle choke)	Universal Vale Tudo Fighting 6	March 3, 1997	1	7:47	Brazil	
Win	4–1	Ucimar Hypolito	KO (punches)	Universal Vale Tudo Fighting 6	March 3, 1997	1	0:05	Brazil	
Win	3–1	Joe Charles	Submission (forearm choke)	World Fighting Federation	February 14, 1997	1	4:42	Birmingham, Alabama, United States	
Loss	2–1	Kevin Randleman	TKO (submission to punches)	Universal Vale Tudo Fighting 4	October 22, 1996	1	5:50	Brazil	
Win	2–0	Dave Beneteau	TKO (doctor stoppage)	Universal Vale Tudo Fighting 4	October 22, 1996	1	4:44	Brazil	
Win	1–0	Mauro Bernardo	Submission (forearm choke)	Universal Vale Tudo Fighting 4	October 22, 1996	1	1:40	Brazil	
