= 2005 in King of the Cage =

Mixed martial arts events

Information
- First date: February 4, 2005
- Last date: December 16, 2005

Events
- Total events: 19

Fights
- Total fights: 234
- Title fights: 13

Chronology
2004 in KOTC	2005 in King of the Cage	2006 in KOTC

The year 2005 is the seventh year in the history of King of the Cage, a mixed martial arts promotion based in the United States. In 2005 King of the Cage held 19 events, KOTC - Australia.

== Title fights ==
Title fights in 2005
Weight class				Method	Round	Time	Event	Notes
Light Heavyweight	Tony Bonello	def.	Edwin Aguilar	Submission (Heel Hook)	1	1:49	KOTC: Australia	(Note: For the King of the Cage Light Heavyweight Championship.)
Welterweight	James Fanshier (c)	def.	Brandon Bell	Submission (Rear-Naked Choke)	1	2:40	KOTC: Australia	(Note: For the King of the Cage Welterweight Championship.)
Middleweight	Joey Villasenor (c)	def.	Brendan Seguin	KO (Punches)	1	2:10	KOTC 48: Payback	(Note: For The King of the Cage Middleweight Championship.)
Super Heavyweight	Eric Pele	def.	Bobby Hoffman	TKO (Punches)	2	2:55	KOTC: Mortal Sins	(Note: For the King of the Cage Super Heavyweight Championship.)
Bantamweight	Urijah Faber (c)	def.	Hiroyuki Abe	TKO (Cut)	3	2:37	KOTC: Mortal Sins	(Note: For the King of the Cage Bantamweight Championship.)
Middleweight	Joey Villasenor (c)	def.	Michael Gonzalez	Submission (Choke)	1	1:05	KOTC 55: Grudge Match	(Note: For The King of the Cage Middleweight Championship.)
Middleweight	Joey Villasenor (c)	def.	Damien Riccio	KO (Punches)	1	1:55	KOTC: Warzone	(Note: For The King of the Cage Middleweight Championship.)
Flyweight	Del Hawkins	def.	Victor Hernandez	Submission (Rear-Naked Choke)	0	N/A	KOTC 56: Caliente	(Note: For the King of the Cage Flyweight Championship.)
Middleweight	Joey Villasenor (c)	def.	Jorge Santiago	Decision (Unanimous)	3	5:00	KOTC 58: Prime Time	(Note: For The King of the Cage Middleweight Championship.)
Flyweight	Manny Tapia	def.	Gregory Vivian	Submission (Arm-Triangle Choke)	1	4:25	KOTC 58: Prime Time	(Note: For the King of the Cage Flyweight Championship.)
Lightweight	Mac Danzig	def.	Takumi Nakayama (c)	TKO (Corner Stoppage)	3	2:45	KOTC: Execution Day	(Note: For the King of the Cage Lightweight Championship.)
Bantamweight	Urijah Faber (c)	def.	Shawn Bias	Submission (Guillotine Choke)	1	1:24	KOTC: Execution Day	(Note: For the King of the Cage Bantamweight Championship.)
Welterweight	Thomas Denny	def.	James Fanshier (c)	TKO (Punches)	2	0:18	KOTC 63: Final Conflict	(Note: For the King of the Cage Welterweight Championship.)

== Events list ==
#	Event Title	Date	Arena	Location
64	KOTC 64: Raging Bull	December 16, 2005	Agora Theater	Cleveland, Ohio
63	KOTC 63: Final Conflict	December 2, 2005	Soboba Casino	San Jacinto, California
62	KOTC: Execution Day	October 29, 2005	Silver Legacy Casino	Reno, Nevada
61	KOTC 61: Flash Point	September 23, 2005	N/A	San Jacinto, California
60	KOTC: Xtreme Edge	September 17, 2005	N/A	Indianapolis, Indiana
59	KOTC 58: Prime Time	August 5, 2005	Soboba Casino	San Jacinto, California
58	KOTC: Socorro	July 23, 2005	N/A	Socorro, New Mexico
57	KOTC 56: Caliente	July 9, 2005	Apache Gold Casino	Globe, Arizona
56	KOTC: Warzone	June 24, 2005	N/A	Sheffield, England
55	KOTC 55: Grudge Match	June 17, 2005	Kiva Auditorium	Albuquerque, New Mexico
54	KOTC 54: Mucho Machismo	June 12, 2005	N/A	San Jacinto, California
53	KOTC: Red Rock	May 21, 2005	N/A	New Mexico
52	KOTC: Mortal Sins	May 7, 2005	N/A	Primm, Nevada
51	KOTC 51: Natural Disaster	April 15, 2005	N/A	El Paso, Texas
50	KOTC 50: First Blood	March 26, 2005	N/A	New Mexico
49	KOTC 49: Soboba	March 20, 2005	N/A	San Jacinto, California
48	KOTC 48: Payback	February 25, 2005	N/A	Cleveland, Ohio
47	KOTC 47: Uprising	February 5, 2005	Albuquerque Convention Center	Albuquerque, New Mexico
46	KOTC: Australia	February 4, 2005	N/A	Australia

== KOTC: Australia ==
KOTC: Australia was an event held on February 4, 2005 in Australia.

=== Results ===
Main Card
Weight class				Method	Round	Time	Notes
Light Heavyweight	Tony Bonello	def.	Edwin Aguilar	Submission (Heel Hook)	1	1:49	(Note: For the King of the Cage Light Heavyweight Championship.)
Welterweight	James Fanshier (c)	def.	Brandon Bell	Submission (Rear-Naked Choke)	1	2:40	(Note: For the King of the Cage Welterweight Championship.)
	Brad Morris	def.	Mick Cutajar	Submission (Punches)	1	2:30
	Tama Te Huna	def.	Mal Foki	Submission (Punches)	1	0:16
	Matt Knight	def.	James Te Huna	DQ (Fence Grabbing)	1	4:01
	Kym Robinson	def.	Andrew Gorton	Decision (Unanimous)	2	5:00
	Tyson Brown	def.	George Pargovski	Submission (Rear-Naked Choke)	1	3:27
	Sasha Nanchouki	def.	Matt Watters	Submission (Neck Crank)	1	1:01

== KOTC 47: Uprising ==
KOTC 47: Uprising was an event held on February 5, 2005 at the Albuquerque Convention Center in Albuquerque, New Mexico, United States.

=== Results ===
Main Card
Weight class				Method	Round	Time	Notes
	Charles Bennett	def.	Victor Hernandez	KO (Punch)	1	0:11
	Eric McElroy	def.	John Rosas	TKO (Punches)	1	N/A
	Brian Schall	def.	Shane Schartzer	KO (Punches)	1	N/A
	Ruben Villareal	def.	Vince Lucero	TKO (Punches)	2	1:04
	Nam Phan	def.	Mike Valdez	Submission (Triangle Choke)	1	0:41
	Michael Gonzalez	def.	Jarome Sierra	KO (Punches)	1	0:40
	Steven Bratland	def.	Theo McDonald	Decision	2	5:00
	Dave Terrel	def.	Patrick Dixon	TKO (Punches)	1	N/A
	Richard Montano	def.	Jose Marquez	Submission (Punches)	2	4:26
	Eric Kucevic	def.	Edgar Delgado	Submission (Armbar)	1	3:17
	Damacio Page	def.	Will Tolliver	TKO (Punches)	1	N/A

== KOTC 48: Payback ==
KOTC 48: Payback was an event held on February 25, 2005 in Cleveland, Ohio, United States.

=== Results ===
Main Card
Weight class				Method	Round	Time	Notes
	Michael Westbrook	def.	Jarrod Bunch	Submission (Rear-Naked Choke)	1	4:55
Middleweight	Joey Villasenor (c)	def.	Brendan Seguin	KO (Punches)	1	2:10	(Note: For The King of the Cage Middleweight Championship.)
	Michael Buchkovich	vs.	Eric Esch	Draw	2	5:00
	Jorge Gurgel	def.	Jason Ireland	Submission (Guillotine Choke)	3	2:25
	Dan Bobish	def.	Ruben Villareal	TKO (Punches)	1	0:55
	Thiago Alves	def.	Jeff Cox	KO (Knee and Punches)	1	0:15
	Forrest Petz	def.	Charles Bennett	Submission (Arm-Triangle Choke)	1	3:40
	James Lee	def.	Walley Keenboom	Submission (Rear-Naked Choke)	1	1:20
	Buddy Clinton	def.	Angelo Popofski	Submission (Armbar)	1	0:30
	Tom Murphy	def.	Josh Hendricks	KO (Punches)	1	1:30
	Paulo Dantas	def.	Jason Dent	Decision (Unanimous)	2	5:00
	Josh Martin	vs.	Steve Durig	Draw	2	5:00
	John Soeder	def.	Jeff Serafin	TKO (Doctor Stoppage)	2	3:15
	Mike Boyd	def.	Brandon Garner	Decision (Unanimous)	2	5:00

== KOTC 49: Soboba ==
KOTC 49: Soboba was an event held on March 20, 2005 in San Jacinto, California, United States.

=== Results ===
Main Card
Weight class				Method	Round	Time	Notes
	Josh Hinger	def.	Chris Monso	Submission (Keylock)	1	2:58
	Rob Kolbeck	def.	Eric Torres	Submission (Triangle Choke)	1	1:47
	Fernando Gonzalez	def.	Reggie Orr	Decision (Majority)	2	5:00
	Charles Bennett	vs.	Gabe Rivas	Draw	2	5:00
	Thomas Denny	def.	Ray Elbe	Submission (Kimura)	2	1:34
	Umar Luv	def.	Andy Maccarone	Decision (Unanimous)	2	5:00
	Charles Diaz	def.	Tom Kenney	Decision (Unanimous)	2	5:00
	Brian Sesma	def.	Adrian Perez	TKO (Punches)	2	0:17
	Tony Lopez	def.	Tony Galindo	KO (Punches)	1	3:24
	Frankie Bollinger	def.	Dan Jones	Submission (Armbar)	1	1:44
	Brent Stevens	def.	Wesley Scobee	Submission	1	1:23
	Nam Phan	def.	Joey Alvarado	KO (Punches)	1	1:08
	Adam Lynn	def.	Brent Wooten	KO (Knee)	1	1:10
	Wes Combs	def.	Randall Limond	TKO (Punches)	1	1:14
	Jason Von Flue	def.	Nick Davanzo	Submission (Choke)	1	0:51
	Zach Taylor	def.	Joe Gallagher	Submission (Guillotine Choke)	1	1:37
	Ray Lizama	def.	Aaron Wetherspoon	KO (Punch)	1	4:52
	Jerry Davis	def.	Allan Wood	TKO (Corner Stoppage)	1	5:00
	Russ Miura	def.	Paul Karsky	Submission (Kimura)	1	1:54

== KOTC 50: First Blood ==
KOTC 50: First Blood was an event held on March 26, 2005 in New Mexico, United States.

=== Results ===
Main Card
Weight class				Method	Round	Time	Notes
	Felipe Chavez	def.	Floyd Saveda	Submission (Rear-Naked Choke)	1	0:45
	Mark Thompson	def.	Will Tolliver	TKO (Punches)	1	0:53
	Thomas Urquides	def.	Richard Montano	Submission (Armbar)	1	4:59
	Gerald Sedillo	def.	Robert Vargas	Submission (Rear-Naked Choke)	1	3:24
	Damacio Page	def.	Jeremy Floyd	Submission (Rear-Naked Choke)	1	1:33
	Jason Otero	def.	Mark Madrid	Submission (Front Choke)	1	2:59
	Dwayne Austin	def.	David Guytan	Submission (Exhaustion)	1	4:52
	Thomas Padilla	def.	Chino Velasquez	KO (Punch)	1	0:07
	Dean Sanchez	def.	Eric Kucevic	Submission (Punches)	1	1:13
	Justin Markland	def.	John Wilson	Submission (Rear-Naked Choke)	1	0:42
	Thricia Poovey	def.	Bernadette Lucero	Submission (Triangle Choke)	1	1:46
	George Salas	def.	David Warner	TKO (Punches)	1	0:36
	Kevin Collins	def.	Raymond Ruiz	Submission (Punches)	1	2:00

== KOTC 51: Natural Disaster ==
KOTC 51: Natural Disaster was an event held on April 15, 2005 in El Paso, Texas, United States.

=== Results ===
Main Card
Weight class				Method	Round	Time	Notes
	Brendan Seguin	def.	Jared Rollins	TKO (Punches)	1	2:19
	Tim Persey	def.	Tony Sylvester	TKO (Punches)	3	3:31
	Hugo Sida	def.	Tommy Gouge	Submission (Armbar)	1	0:38
	Del Hawkins	def.	Leo Uriquez	TKO (Corner Stoppage)	1	5:00
	Jerome Beal	def.	David Rivera	TKO (Punches)	2	3:34
	Mario Stapel	def.	John Cronk	TKO (Doctor Stoppage)	1	2:47
	Mike Valdez	def.	Theo McDonald	TKO (Doctor Stoppage)	1	2:06
	Miguel Gutierrez	def.	Brent Wooten	TKO (Punches)	1	0:14
	Frank Marquez	def.	Joe Vigil	Submission (Triangle Choke)	1	0:46
	Brian Ryan	def.	Andy Montana	KO (Punches)	1	3:17

== KOTC: Mortal Sins ==
KOTC: Mortal Sins was an event held on May 7, 2005 in Primm, Nevada, United States.

=== Results ===
Main Card
Weight class				Method	Round	Time	Notes
Super Heavyweight	Eric Pele	def.	Bobby Hoffman	TKO (Punches)	2	2:55	(Note: For the King of the Cage Super Heavyweight Championship.)
Bantamweight	Urijah Faber (c)	def.	Hiroyuki Abe	TKO (Cut)	3	2:37	(Note: For the King of the Cage Bantamweight Championship.)
	Jason Lambert	def.	Marvin Eastman	Decision (Split)	3	5:00
	Miguel Gutierrez	def.	Fernando Gonzalez	Submission (Armbar)	1	1:42
	Joe Frainee	def.	Frankie Bollinger	TKO (Punches)	1	3:44
	Manny Tapia	def.	Richard Goodman	TKO (Punches)	2	2:07
	Hector Ramirez	def.	Kendall Grove	KO (Punch)	1	1:08
	Dave Terrel	def.	Ray Perales	Decision (Unanimous)	3	5:00

== KOTC: Red Rock ==
KOTC: Red Rock was an event held on May 21, 2005 in New Mexico, United States.

=== Results ===
Main Card
Weight class				Method	Round	Time	Notes
	Levi Saucedo	def.	Felipe Chavez	KO	1	0:17
	Presley Sherman	def.	Mike Lucero	Submission (Rear Naked Choke)	2	2:05
	Rylan Sandoval	def.	James Torrez	Submission (Rear Naked Choke)	1	1:14
	Thomas Padilla	def.	Adolphus Walker	Submission (Rear Naked Choke)	1	0:38
	Lawrence Montano	def.	Abe Vining	Submission (Rear Naked Choke)	1	1:18
	Eric Buck	def.	Sam Parker	Submission (Heel Hook)	2	0:53
	Matt Baker	def.	John Wilson	Submission (Strikes)	1	0:12
	Jerome Martinez	def.	Justin Markland	Submission (Strikes)	1	0:33
	Johnny Velasquez	def.	Zac White	Submission (Rear Naked Choke)	1	0:25

== KOTC 54: Mucho Machismo ==
KOTC 54: Mucho Machismo was an event held on June 12, 2005 in San Jacinto, California, United States.

=== Results ===
Main Card
Weight class				Method	Round	Time	Notes
	Ray Lizama	def.	Emmanuel Ley	Submission (Triangle Choke)	2	N/A
	Randy Velarde	def.	Devon Miller	TKO (Punches)	1	0:31
	Nam Phan	def.	Sost Infante	TKO (Cut)	1	0:51
	Thomas Denny	def.	Thomas Padilla	Submission (Rear-Naked Choke)	1	1:54
	Thomas Kenney	def.	Aaron Torres	Submission (Guillotine Choke)	1	3:33
	Richard Solis	def.	John Cole	TKO (Punches)	1	1:55
	John Paulson	def.	Shad Smith	KO (Punch)	1	1:19
	Erik Apple	def.	Mark Kempthorne	TKO (Corner Stoppage)	2	1:57
	Cipi Gamino	def.	Bucky Hamilton	Submission (Punches)	1	1:19
	Jerry Davis	def.	Adrian Perez	Submission (Choke)	1	2:21
	Josh Smith	def.	Joey Alvarado	Submission (Punches)	2	1:59
	Armando Sanchez	def.	Kyle Olsen	TKO (Asthma Attack)	2	2:21
	Eddie Sanchez	def.	Anthony Ruiz	Technical Submission (Triangle Choke)	1	2:49
	Victor Hunsaker	def.	Bill Duvall	Submission (Toe Hold)	1	2:23
	Paul Perry	def.	Robert Dupont	TKO (Punches)	1	1:19
	Illiums Goglia	def.	Nick Davanzo	Submission (Rear-Naked Choke)	1	1:39
	Mac Danzig	def.	Mike Valdez	Submission (Rear-Naked Choke)	1	4:13

== KOTC 55: Grudge Match ==
KOTC 55: Grudge Match was an event held on June 17, 2005 the Kiva Auditorium in Albuquerque, New Mexico, United States.

=== Results ===
Main Card
Weight class				Method	Round	Time	Notes
	Richard Montano	def.	Wade Stringer	Decision	2	5:00
	Miguel Gutierrez	def.	Robert Smith	KO (Punches)	1	0:08
Middleweight	Joey Villasenor (c)	def.	Michael Gonzalez	Submission (Choke)	1	1:05	(Note: For The King of the Cage Middleweight Championship.)
	Charles Bennett	def.	Theo McDonald	TKO (Punches)	1	4:40
	Maurice Jackson	def.	Tim Persey	No Contest	2	N/A
	Jared Rollins	def.	Steve Lapoint	TKO (Punches)	1	2:34
	Mario Stapel	def.	Shannon Ritch	Submission (Armbar)	1	4:43
	Victoria Remington	def.	Camille Minitrez	Submission (Rear-Naked Choke)	1	0:57
	Daniel Weichel	def.	Mike Lucero	Submission (Guillotine Choke)	1	3:40

== KOTC: Warzone ==
KOTC: Warzone was an event held on June 24, 2005 in Sheffield, England.

=== Results ===
Main Card
Weight class				Method	Round	Time	Notes
Middleweight	Joey Villasenor (c)	def.	Damien Riccio	KO (Punches)	1	1:55	(Note: For The King of the Cage Middleweight Championship.)
	Martin Kampmann	def.	Brendan Seguin	KO (Head Kick)	1	2:05
	Paul Jenkins	def.	Atif Zariouhi	TKO (Punches)	2	1:04
	Matt Thorpe	def.	Aaron Barrow	Submission (Triangle Choke)	1	N/A
	Dan Hardy	def.	Alexandre Izidro	Decision (Unanimous)	2	5:00
	Ross Pettifer	def.	Leslee Ojugbana	TKO (Punches)	2	2:46
	Lewis Barrow	def.	Ian Jones	Submission (Rear-Naked Choke)	1	4:48
	Nigel Whitear	def.	Jason Simpson	TKO (Doctor Stoppage)	1	2:04
	Aaron Karels	def.	Kris Leverton	TKO (Punches)	1	3:14

== KOTC 56: Caliente ==
KOTC 56: Caliente was an event held on July 9, 2005 in Globe, Arizona, United States.

=== Results ===
Main Card
Weight class				Method	Round	Time	Notes
	Charles Bennett	def.	Gabe Rivas	TKO (Dislocated Thumb)	1	2:21
	Edwin Dewees	def.	Chance Williams	Submission (Rear-Naked Choke)	1	1:16
	Shannon Ritch	def.	Robert Sarkozi	DQ (Illegal Kick)	1	1:53
Flyweight	Del Hawkins	def.	Victor Hernandez	Submission (Rear-Naked Choke)	0	N/A	(Note: For the King of the Cage Flyweight Championship.)
	Maurice Jackson	def.	Gabor Nemeth	Submission (Verbal)	1	1:21
	Robert Beraun	def.	Eddie Espinoza	KO (Punches)	1	0:40
	Chad Dietmeyer	def.	Adrian Leos	Submission (Armbar)	1	1:43
	Keith Dixon	def.	Brian Swanda	Submission (Rear-Naked Choke)	1	2:45
	Jamie Varner	def.	Tony Llamas	NC (Llamas Injured by Illegal Strike)	0	N/A
	Leroy Fornof	def.	Stacy Hakes	Submission (Rear Naked Choke)	1	2:25
	Vincent Perez	def.	Ryan Briscon	N/A	1	4:49
	Rich Beecroft	def.	Brad Reynolds	Submission (Punches)	1	1:40
	Jesse Moreng	def.	Dallas Johnson	Submission (Rear-Naked Choke)	1	2:25
	Steve McDonald	def.	Frank Sanchez	Submission (Rear-Naked Choke)	1	3:27
	Ray Steinbeiss	def.	Paul Karsky	KO (Punch)	1	0:12

== KOTC: Socorro ==
KOTC: Socorro was an event held on July 23, 2005 in Socorro, New Mexico, United States.

=== Results ===
Main Card
Weight class				Method	Round	Time	Notes
	Thomas Padilla	def.	Gabe Perea	Submission (Guillotine Choke)	0	0:00
	Thomas Urquides	def.	Richard Montano	Decision (Unanimous)	2	5:00
	John Dodson	def.	Johnny Velasquez	Decision (Split)	2	5:00

== KOTC 58: Prime Time ==
KOTC 58: Prime Time was an event held on August 5, 2005 at the Soboba Casino in San Jacinto, California, United States.

=== Results ===
Main Card
Weight class				Method	Round	Time	Notes
	Robert Driml	def.	Anthony Montoya	KO (Punches)	1	1:10
	Tyler Aimer	def.	Ron Torres	Submission (Armbar)	1	2:31
	Jay Martinez	def.	Andy Maccarone	Decision (Unanimous)	2	5:00
	James Lee	def.	Chris Peak	Submission (Heel Hook)	1	1:33
	Cub Swanson	def.	Armando Sanchez	Submission (Punches)	1	1:59
Middleweight	Joey Villasenor (c)	def.	Jorge Santiago	Decision (Unanimous)	3	5:00	(Note: For The King of the Cage Middleweight Championship.)
	Victor Valenzuela	vs.	Charles Bennett	Draw	2	5:00
Flyweight	Manny Tapia	def.	Gregory Vivian	Submission (Arm-Triangle Choke)	1	4:25	(Note: For the King of the Cage Flyweight Championship.)
	Wes Combs	def.	Brian Sesma	TKO (Punches)	1	2:40
	Thomas Denny	def.	Frank Kirmse	Submission (Rear-Naked Choke)	1	3:41
	Hector Ramirez	vs.	Emanuel Newton	Draw	2	5:00
	Nam Phan	def.	Joe Frainee	Submission (Armbar)	1	3:28
	Tim Persey	def.	Poki Poki	Submission (Guillotine Choke)	1	1:29
	Michael Guymon	def.	Ray Perales	Submission (Triangle Choke)	1	4:02
	John Alessio	def.	Shannon Ritch	TKO (Punches)	1	0:41
	Paulo Dantas	def.	Jay Valencia	KO (Knee)	1	0:29
	Buddy Clinton	def.	John Caulson	Submission (Triangle Choke)	1	1:26
	Shawn Bias	def.	John De La O	Submission (Guillotine Choke)	1	4:41
	Rob McCullough	def.	Jeremy Jones	TKO (Punches)	1	0:45
	Ernie Perea	def.	George Adkins	Submission (Triangle Choke)	1	1:08
	Fernando Gonzalez	def.	Aaron Torres	Submission (Punches)	1	1:33

== KOTC: Xtreme Edge ==
KOTC: Xtreme Edge was an event held on September 17, 2005 in Indianapolis, Indiana, United States.

=== Results ===
Main Card
Weight class				Method	Round	Time	Notes
	Robbie Lawler	def.	Jeremy Brown	Submission (Armbar)	1	2:48
	Gideon Ray	def.	Trevor Garrett	Submission (Rear-Naked Choke)	1	2:17
	Jeremy Bolt	def.	Christian Nielson	Submission (Guillotine Choke)	1	1:58
	Antoine Skinner	def.	Chris Higi	TKO (Punches)	2	2:48
	Clay Guida	def.	Dave Lehr Cochran	Submission (Rear-Naked Choke)	1	2:26
	Jason Reinhardt	def.	Brad Cottrell	TKO (Punches)	1	1:37
	Ron Fields	def.	Robin Johnson	Submission (Triangle Choke)	1	2:49
	Tommy Lee	def.	David Love	Decision (Unanimous)	2	5:00
	Terrance Crampton	def.	Brandon Quigley	TKO (Injury)	1	0:26
	Geno Roderick	def.	Seshomaru Tamashi	TKO (Punches)	1	1:38
	Billy Kidd	def.	Tom Logsdon	Submission (Guillotine Choke)	2	2:24

== KOTC 61: Flash Point ==
KOTC 61: Flash Point was an event held on September 23, 2005 in San Jacinto, California, United States.

=== Results ===
Main Card
Weight class				Method	Round	Time	Notes
	Wes Combs	def.	Brent Stevens	Submission (Guillotine Choke)	1	1:18
	Richard Solis	vs.	Victor Valenzuela	Draw	2	5:00
	Dave Hisquierdo	def.	Brian Harper	TKO (Punches)	1	4:01
	Gabe Ruediger	def.	Bobir Hasanov	Submission (Armbar)	1	0:23
	Jimmy Smith	def.	Vince Gooseman	Submission (Armbar)	1	2:50
	Jeff Clark	def.	David Avilla	TKO (Cut)	1	1:53
	Rob Emerson	def.	Julian Samaniego	TKO (Punches)	1	2:15
	Brian Warren	def.	Paul Karsky	TKO (Cut)	1	2:32
	Kyle York	def.	Robert Zunner	Submission (Punches)	1	0:56
	Umar Luv	def.	Fredrick Gerlach	Submission (Guillotine Choke)	1	1:26
	Frank Guerrero	def.	Joe Bartholic	TKO (Punches)	1	2:43
	Danny Suarez	def.	Sost Infante	Submission (Armbar)	1	1:46
	Cub Swanson	def.	Mike Corey	TKO (Cut)	2	2:52
	Ernie Gonzalez	def.	Lonnie Wright	Submission (Triangle Armbar)	2	1:27
	Kelly Cramwell	def.	George Adkins	Decision (Unanimous)	2	5:00
	Daniel Williams	def.	Mark Lehner	Submission (Guillotine Choke)	1	1:05
	Mike Mirelez	def.	Jeremy Wiley	Submission (Armbar)	1	1:05
	Jimmy Ramirez	def.	Johnny Vasquez	Disqualification	1	0:59
	Eddie Sanchez	def.	Adrian Perez	Submission (Punches)	1	0:11
	Dave Kelly	vs.	Gene Gilsdorf	Draw	2	5:00

== KOTC: Execution Day ==
KOTC: Execution Day was an event held on October 29, 2005 at the Silver Legacy Casino in Reno, Nevada, United States.

=== Results ===
Main Card
Weight class				Method	Round	Time	Notes
Lightweight	Mac Danzig	def.	Takumi Nakayama (c)	TKO (Corner Stoppage)	3	2:45	(Note: For the King of the Cage Lightweight Championship.)
	Richard Montoya	def.	Aaron Brink	Submission (Guillotine Choke)	1	1:55
Bantamweight	Urijah Faber (c)	def.	Shawn Bias	Submission (Guillotine Choke)	1	1:24	(Note: For the King of the Cage Bantamweight Championship.)
	Ruben Villareal	def.	Jason Weiss	Submission (Punches)	1	3:52
	Takafumi Hanai	def.	Buddy Clinton	TKO (Punches)	3	0:18
	Jaime Jara	def.	Joe Cota	Decision (Split)	3	5:00
	Dan Molina	def.	Phil Garcia	Submission (Toe Hold)	1	1:18
	Ryan Healy	def.	Adam Torres	Submission (Armbar)	1	3:50
	Aaron Jameson	def.	Steven Thames	Submission (Guillotine Choke)	1	1:12

== KOTC 63: Final Conflict ==
KOTC 63: Final Conflict was an event held on December 2, 2005 at the Soboba Casino in San Jacinto, California, United States.

=== Results ===
Main Card
Weight class				Method	Round	Time	Notes
	Anthony Mendez	def.	Robert Zunner	Submission (Punches)	1	0:56
	Lucas Taber	def.	Robert Driml	Submission (Heel Hook)	1	0:41
	Joey Alvarado	def.	Jason Wheat	Submission (Armbar)	1	0:19
	Keith Berry	def.	Johnny Vasquez	TKO (Punches)	1	N/A
	Aaron Wetherspoon	def.	Val Leedy	KO (Punches)	1	1:52
	Billy Bearman	def.	Betto Cornica	Technical Submission (Triangle Choke)	1	1:27
	Nam Phan	def.	Albert Hill	Submission (Armbar)	1	0:12
Welterweight	Thomas Denny	def.	James Fanshier (c)	TKO (Punches)	2	0:18	(Note: For the King of the Cage Welterweight Championship.)
	Fernando Gonzalez	def.	Ray Lizama	Decision (Unanimous)	2	5:00
	Manny Tapia	def.	Ed Newalu	Decision (Unanimous)	3	5:00
	Rob McCullough	def.	Gabe Rivas	Submission (Verbal)	2	3:11
	Cub Swanson	def.	Fernando Arreola	Submission (Punches)	1	3:21
	Mike Bourke	def.	Alan Zunner	Submission (Forearm Choke)	1	1:04
	Thomas Kenney	def.	Shawn Bias	Technical Submission (Arm-Triangle Choke)	2	0:23
	Brian Warren	def.	Rubin Taigle	TKO (Punches)	1	1:15
	Dave Rivas	def.	Kaleo Kwan	Decision (Unanimous)	2	5:00
	Buckley Acosta	def.	Aaron Brink	KO (Punch)	1	0:10
	Michael Guymon	def.	Ken Cadoy	Submission (Guillotine Choke)	1	N/A
	Lawrence Gant	def.	Patrick White	Submission (Rear-Naked Choke)	1	1:28

== KOTC 64: Raging Bull ==
KOTC 64: Raging Bull was an event held on December 16, 2005 at the Agora Theater in Cleveland, Ohio, United States.

=== Results ===
Main Card
Weight class				Method	Round	Time	Notes
	Dan Bobish	def.	Joey Smith	Submission (Punches)	1	0:21
	Jake Ellenberger	def.	LaVerne Clark	Submission (Triangle Choke)	2	3:06
	Terry Martin	def.	Ron Fields	Submission (Guillotine Choke)	2	2:37
	Dereck Keasley	def.	Jeff Cox	Submission (Triangle Choke)	1	4:07
	Trevor Garrett	def.	Brendan Seguin	TKO (Cut)	2	4:07
	Jimmy Boyd	def.	Mike Russo	TKO (Punches)	1	3:46
	Matt Masterson	def.	Rex Holman	Submission (Rear-Naked Choke)	2	3:01
	Sean Salmon	def.	Jerry Spiegel	Decision (Unanimous)	3	5:00
	Josh Martin	def.	Seshomaru Tamashi	TKO (Punches)	1	0:19

== See also ==
- King of the Cage
- List of King of the Cage events
- List of King of the Cage champions
