= 2003 in King of the Cage =

Mixed martial arts events

Information
- First date: February 21, 2003
- Last date: December 6, 2003

Events
- Total events: 11

Fights
- Total fights: 129
- Title fights: 15

Chronology
2002 in KOTC	2003 in King of the Cage	2004 in KOTC

The year 2003 is the fifth year in the history of King of the Cage, a mixed martial arts promotion based in the United States. In 2003 King of the Cage held 11 events, KOTC 21: Invasion.

== Title fights ==
Title fights in 2003
Weight class				Method	Round	Time	Event	Notes
Heavyweight	Bobby Hoffman	def.	Jason Godsey	TKO (Punches)	1	1:56	KOTC 21: Invasion	(Note: For the King of the Cage Heavyweight Championship.)
Lightweight	Alberto Crane	def.	Javier Vazquez (c)	Decision (Split)	3	5:00	KOTC 21: Invasion	(Note: For the King of the Cage Lightweight Championship.)
Super Heavyweight	Jimmy Ambriz (c)	def.	Johnathan Ivey	Submission (Choke)	1	3:00	KOTC 21: Invasion	(Note: For the King of the Cage Super Heavyweight Championship.)
Super Heavyweight	Eric Pele	def.	Dan Christison	TKO	1	4:50	KOTC 23: Sin City	(Note: For the King of the Cage Super Heavyweight Championship.)
Light Heavyweight	Jeremy Horn	def.	Vernon White (c)	Decision (Unanimous)	5	5:00	KOTC 23: Sin City	(Note: For The King of the Cage Light Heavyweight Championship.)
Welterweight	Ronald Jhun	def.	Shonie Carter	Decision (Unanimous)	5	5:00	KOTC 23: Sin City	(Note: For the King of the Cage Welterweight Championship.)
Lightweight	Thomas Schulte	def.	John Mahlow	Submission (Armbar)	1	2:41	KOTC 24: Mayhem	(Note: For the King of the Cage Lightweight Championship.)
Middleweight	Dean Lister (c)	def.	Brian Sleeman	Submission (Armbar)	1	1:14	KOTC 25: Flaming Fury	(Note: For The King of the Cage Middleweight Championship.)
Heavyweight	Bobby Hoffman (c)	def.	Paul Buentello	Decision (Unanimous)	3	5:00	KOTC 27: Aftermath	(Note: For the King of the Cage Heavyweight Championship.)
Flyweight	Shawn Ramage	def.	Kevin Alliva	Submission (Rear Naked Choke)	1	0:58	KOTC 27: Aftermath	(Note: For the King of the Cage Flyweight Championship.)
Welterweight	John Alessio	def.	Ronald Jhun (c)	Decision (Unanimous)	3	5:00	KOTC 29: Renegades	(Note: For the King of the Cage Welterweight Championship.)
Middleweight	Dean Lister (c)	def.	James Lee	Submission (Armbar)	1	N/A	KOTC 29: Renegades	(Note: For The King of the Cage Middleweight Championship.)
Heavyweight	Paul Buentello	def.	Bobby Hoffman (c)	Submission (Verbal)	2	N/A	KOTC 30: The Pinnacle	(Note: For the King of the Cage Heavyweight Championship.)
Lightweight	Joe Stevenson	def.	Thomas Schulte (c)	KO (Knee)	1	3:29	KOTC 30: The Pinnacle	(Note: For the King of the Cage Lightweight Championship.)
Light Heavyweight	Jeremy Horn (c)	def.	Dean Lister	Decision (Majority)	4	5:00	KOTC 31: King of the Cage 31	(Note: For The King of the Cage Light Heavyweight Championship.)

== Events list ==
#	Event title	Date	Arena	Location
31	KOTC 31: King of the Cage 31	December 6, 2003	Soboba Casino	San Jacinto, California
30	KOTC 30: The Pinnacle	November 12, 2003	Pala Casino Spa Resort	Pala, California
29	KOTC 29: Renegades	September 5, 2003	Soboba Casino	San Jacinto, California
28	KOTC 28: More Punishment	August 16, 2003	N/A	Reno, Nevada
27	KOTC 27: Aftermath	August 10, 2003	Saboba Casino	San Jacinto, California
26	KOTC 26: Gladiator Challenge	August 3, 2003	Sky City Casino	Acoma, New Mexico
25	KOTC 25: Flaming Fury	June 29, 2003	Soboba Casino	San Jacinto, California
24	KOTC 24: Mayhem	June 14, 2003	N/A	Albuquerque, New Mexico
23	KOTC 23: Sin City	May 16, 2003	Orleans Hotel Casino	Las Vegas, Nevada
22	KOTC 22: Steel Warrior	March 23, 2003	Soboba Casino	San Jacinto, California
21	KOTC 21: Invasion	February 21, 2003	Santa Ana Star Hotel & Casino	Albuquerque, New Mexico

== KOTC 21: Invasion ==
KOTC 21: Invasion was an event held on February 21, 2003, at the Santa Ana Star Hotel & Casino in Albuquerque, New Mexico, United States.

=== Results ===
Main Card
Weight class				Method	Round	Time	Notes
Heavyweight	Bobby Hoffman	def.	Jason Godsey	TKO (Punches)	1	1:56	(Note: For the King of the Cage Heavyweight Championship.)
Lightweight	Alberto Crane	def.	Javier Vazquez (c)	Decision (Split)	3	5:00	(Note: For the King of the Cage Lightweight Championship.)
Super Heavyweight	Jimmy Ambriz (c)	def.	Johnathan Ivey	Submission (Choke)	1	3:00	(Note: For the King of the Cage Super Heavyweight Championship.)
	Shonie Carter	def.	Fernando Vasconcelos	TKO (Retirement)	2	5:00
	Joey Villasenor	def.	Tony Galindo	TKO (Corner Stoppage)	1	5:00
	Seth Petruzelli	def.	Brian Hawkins	TKO (Punches)	1	2:21
	Bobby Hoffman	def.	Sam Sotello	Submission (Injury)	2	0:23
	Diego Sanchez	def.	Jake Short	TKO (Punches)	1	2:34
	Jason Godsey	def.	Chris Guillen	Submission (Guillotine Choke)	1	1:35
	Keith Jardine	def.	Allan Sullivan	TKO (Punches)	2	1:56
	Thomas Schulte	def.	Frank Marquez	Submission (Armbar)	2	2:08

== KOTC 22: Steel Warrior ==
KOTC 22: Steel Warrior was an event held on March 23, 2003, at the Soboba Casino in San Jacinto, California, United States.

=== Results ===
Main Card
Weight class				Method	Round	Time	Notes
	Karo Parisyan	def.	Fernando Vasconcelos	Decision (Unanimous)	3	5:00
	John Cole	def.	Richard Solis	Decision (Unanimous)	2	5:00
	Thomas Denny	def.	Justin Stanley	Submission (Rear-Naked Choke)	1	3:12
	Art Santore	def.	Joe Garcia	TKO (Punches)	2	3:10
	Jason Lambert	def.	Jim Breech	TKO (Punches)	1	1:35
	John De La O	def.	Joe Camacho	Submission (Armbar)	2	4:09
	Jason House	def.	Sost Infante	TKO (Punches)	2	1:32
	Adam Lynn	def.	Tadarius Thomas	TKO (Punches)	2	1:37
	Louie Vaith	def.	Robert Dowell	Submission (Triangle Choke)	1	0:48
	Wes Combs	def.	Dale McDonald	Submission (Punches)	1	1:40
	Raul Delgado	vs.	Timothy Mendoza	Draw	2	5:00
	Louis Jablonski	def.	David Ortiz	Submission (Rear-Naked Choke)	1	1:18
	Daniel Ortiz	def.	Mike Cardova	TKO (Punches)	1	2:55
	Tony Bonello	def.	T Bone	Submission (Rear-Naked Choke)	1	0:39
	Steve Renaud	def.	Brent Wooten	TKO (Elbows)	2	2:32

== KOTC 23: Sin City ==
KOTC 23: Sin City was an event held on May 16, 2003, at the Orleans Hotel Casino in Las Vegas, Nevada, United States.

=== Results ===
Main Card
Weight class				Method	Round	Time	Notes
Super Heavyweight	Eric Pele	def.	Dan Christison	TKO	1	4:50	(Note: For the King of the Cage Super Heavyweight Championship.)
	Dan Severn	def.	Cory Timmerman	Decision (Unanimous)	3	5:00
Light Heavyweight	Jeremy Horn	def.	Vernon White (c)	Decision (Unanimous)	5	5:00	(Note: For The King of the Cage Light Heavyweight Championship.)
Welterweight	Ronald Jhun	def.	Shonie Carter	Decision (Unanimous)	5	5:00	(Note: For the King of the Cage Welterweight Championship.)
	Joe Stevenson	def.	Thomas Denny	Submission (Guillotine Choke)	1	0:15
	Art Santore	def.	Joe Crilly	TKO (Strikes)	1	4:45
	Diego Sanchez	def.	Michael Guymon	Submission (Armbar)	1	4:57
	Bryan Pardoe	def.	Brent Stevens	Submission (Rear Naked Choke)	1	1:56
	Bobby Gamboa	def.	Dave Rivas	Decision (Unanimous)	3	5:00

== KOTC 24: Mayhem ==
KOTC 24: Mayhem was an event held on June 14, 2003, in Albuquerque, New Mexico, United States.

=== Results ===
Main Card
Weight class				Method	Round	Time	Notes
	Dan Severn	def.	Dan Christison	Decision (Split)	3	5:00
Lightweight	Thomas Schulte	def.	John Mahlow	Submission (Armbar)	1	2:41	(Note: For the King of the Cage Lightweight Championship.)
	Joey Villasenor	def.	Joe Merit	TKO	1	4:06
	Paul Rodriguez	def.	Adam Durant	Submission (Rear Naked Choke)	1	4:29
	Keith Jardine	def.	George Allen	Decision (Unanimous)	2	5:00
	Diego Sanchez	def.	Rene Kronvold	Submission (Armbar)	1	3:39
	Santino Defranco	def.	Josh Pacheco	Submission (Triangle Choke)	1	0:39
	Jimmy Westfall	def.	Eric McElroy	Submission (Strikes)	1	1:49
	Mike Mendoza	def.	Victor Hernandez	Submission (Armbar)	1	0:49
	Fletcher Sievers	def.	Tyrell McElroy	Submission (Triangle Choke)	1	1:58

== KOTC 25: Flaming Fury ==
KOTC 25: Flaming Fury was an event held on June 29, 2003, at the Soboba Casino in San Jacinto, California, United States.

=== Results ===
Main Card
Weight class				Method	Round	Time	Notes
Middleweight	Dean Lister (c)	def.	Brian Sleeman	Submission (Armbar)	1	1:14	(Note: For The King of the Cage Middleweight Championship.)
	Gustavo Machado	def.	Nate Quarry	Decision (Unanimous)	3	5:00
	Jason Lambert	def.	Brian Foster	Decision (Unanimous)	2	5:00
	Greg Mayer	def.	Jamal Perkins	Submission (Rear-Naked Choke)	1	0:38
	Thomas Denny	def.	Kyle Brees	Decision (Unanimous)	2	5:00
	Randy Velarde	def.	Marcus Santos	TKO (Knee Injury)	1	5:00
	Jeff Newton	def.	Allan Sullivan	Submission (Ankle Lock)	2	4:06
	Shad Smith	def.	Louie Vaith	TKO (Punches)	1	3:53
	Wes Combs	def.	Raul Delgado	KO (Punch)	1	0:23
	Alex Richard	def.	Auggie Garcia	Submission (Ankle Lock)	1	2:08
	Chad Davis	def.	Kevin Cook	Decision (Split)	2	5:00
	Buck Meredith	def.	Harris Sarmiento	Submission (Punches)	2	3:41
	Baki Baki	def.	Kauai Kupihea	Submission (Guillotine Choke)	1	0:22

== KOTC 26: Gladiator Challenge ==
KOTC 26: Gladiator Challenge was an event held on August 3, 2003, at the Sky City Casino in Acoma, New Mexico, United States.

=== Results ===
Main Card
Weight class				Method	Round	Time	Notes
	Diego Sanchez	def.	John Cronk	Submission (Kimura)	2	1:30
	Kyle Seals	def.	Tyrell McElroy	TKO (Punches)	1	0:42
	Carlos Condit	def.	David Lindemeyer	Submission (Armbar)	1	0:46
	Tait Fletcher	def.	Jimmy Westfall	Submission (Rear-Naked Choke)	1	3:10
	Renato Migliaccio	def.	Victor Hernandez	Submission (Rear-Naked Choke)	1	1:18
	Brian Schall	def.	Eric McElroy	Submission	1	N/A
	Darrel Priddy	def.	Pat James	TKO (Corner Stoppage)	1	5:00
	Ben Schilsler	def.	Isaac Vallie-Flagg	Submission (Armbar)	1	0:29
	Andy Seals	def.	Dereck Keasley	Submission (Rear-Naked Choke)	1	1:46
	Ed Tomaselli	def.	Vinny Cano	Submission (Punches)	1	0:42
	Yohan Perez	def.	Sammy Orona	Submission (Triangle Choke)	1	1:58
	Ressen Messer	def.	Orlando Martinez	Submission (Rear-Naked Choke)	1	2:20
	Jason Tapia	def.	Jim Cox	TKO (Punches)	1	1:00

== KOTC 27: Aftermath ==
KOTC 27: Aftermath was an event held on August 10, 2003, at the Saboba Casino in San Jacinto, California, United States.

=== Results ===
Main Card
Weight class				Method	Round	Time	Notes
Heavyweight	Bobby Hoffman (c)	def.	Paul Buentello	Decision (Unanimous)	3	5:00	(Note: For the King of the Cage Heavyweight Championship.)
	Joe Stevenson	def.	Marcus Cacella	TKO (Corner Stoppage)	1	4:21
	Jerry Vrbanovic	def.	Baki Baki	KO (Knees)	1	1:32
	Antonio McKee	def.	Marcus Aurelio	Decision (Split)	2	5:00
	Keigo Kunihara	def.	Timothy Mendoza	TKO (Punches)	1	1:07
	Manny Gamburyan	def.	Jorge Santiago	KO (Punch)	1	0:21
	Dave Rivas	def.	Steve Hallock	Decision (Unanimous)	2	5:00
Flyweight	Shawn Ramage	def.	Kevin Alliva	Submission (Rear Naked Choke)	1	0:58	(Note: For the King of the Cage Flyweight Championship.)
	Wes Combs	def.	Jonah Broad	TKO (Punches)	1	0:41
	Andy Murad	def.	Saldana Clemente	TKO (Punches)	1	1:25
	Matt McPherson	def.	Orion Gallagher	Submission (Rear Naked Choke)	1	1:07
	Frankie Bollinger	def.	Robert Breslin	Submission (Armbar)	1	3:15

== KOTC 28: More Punishment ==
KOTC 28: More Punishment was an event held on August 16, 2003, in Reno, Nevada, United States.

=== Results ===
Main Card
Weight class				Method	Round	Time	Notes
	Benji Radach	def.	Gustavo Machado	KO (Punches)	1	1:31
	Drew Fickett	def.	Dennis Hallman	Decision (Split)	3	5:00
	Joey Villasenor	def.	James Fanshier	Submission (Rear Naked Choke)	2	2:26
	Art Santore	def.	Sean Gray	TKO (Punches)	3	0:54
	Jason Coronado	def.	Rocky Batastini	Submission (Rear Naked Choke)	1	3:24
	Bo Cantrell	def.	Rick Collup	Submission (Guillotine Choke)	2	0:13
	Jake Short	def.	Paul Purcell	TKO (Punches)	1	0:51
	Casey Balkenbush	def.	Steve Renaud	Submission (Armbar)	1	0:51
	Khomkrit Niimi	def.	Dan Mann	TKO (Punches)	2	3:04

== KOTC 29: Renegades ==
KOTC 29: Renegades was an event held on September 5, 2003, at the Soboba Casino in San Jacinto, California, United States.

=== Results ===
Main Card
Weight class				Method	Round	Time	Notes
Welterweight	John Alessio	def.	Ronald Jhun (c)	Decision (Unanimous)	3	5:00	(Note: For the King of the Cage Welterweight Championship.)
Middleweight	Dean Lister (c)	def.	James Lee	Submission (Armbar)	1	N/A	(Note: For The King of the Cage Middleweight Championship.)
	Jeff Newton	def.	Dusty Arden	Submission (Choke)	1	N/A
	Charlie Valencia	def.	Greg Mayer	Submission (Heel Hook)	2	1:43
	Wes Combs	def.	Tony Petarra	KO (Punches)	1	1:22
	Joe Crilly	def.	Javier Casio	TKO (Punches)	1	1:37
	Thomas Denny	def.	Jason Dolder	TKO (Punches)	1	2:22
	Joe Camacho	def.	Juliano Prado	KO (Punches)	1	2:42
	Charles Bennett	def.	William Sriyapai	Decision (Split)	2	5:00
	Thomas Kenney	def.	Paul Cid	TKO (Punches)	2	0:39
	Richard Solis	def.	Alex Richard	Submission (Guillotine Choke)	1	3:19
	Rick McCorkell	def.	Jason Dickson	TKO (Punches)	1	1:07
	Buddy Clinton	def.	Mike Penalber	Submission (Choke)	1	4:26

== KOTC 30: The Pinnacle ==
KOTC 30: The Pinnacle was an event held on November 12, 2003, at the Pala Casino Spa Resort in Pala, California, United States.

=== Results ===
Main Card
Weight class				Method	Round	Time	Notes
Heavyweight	Paul Buentello	def.	Bobby Hoffman (c)	Submission (Verbal)	2	N/A	(Note: For the King of the Cage Heavyweight Championship.)
Lightweight	Joe Stevenson	def.	Thomas Schulte (c)	KO (Knee)	1	3:29	(Note: For the King of the Cage Lightweight Championship.)
	Thomas Denny	def.	Richard Solis	Submission (Armbar)	2	3:15
	Jeff Newton	def.	Joe Crilly	KO (Kick)	1	2:05
	Tony Bonello	def.	Mansour Heidari	Submission (Triangle Choke)	1	0:29
	Joey Villasenor	def.	Art Santore	TKO (Cut)	2	0:31
	Wade Shipp	def.	Kengo Watanabe	TKO (Punches)	1	3:42
	Keigo Kunihara	def.	Mike Bourke	Decision	2	5:00
	Kyle Brees	def.	John Cole	Submission (Reverse Triangle Choke)	1	2:28
	Ray Elbe	def.	Paul Silva	Submission (Armbar)	1	3:35
	Dale Breese	def.	Albert Hill	Decision (Unanimous)	2	5:00

== KOTC 31: King of the Cage 31 ==
KOTC 31: King of the Cage 31 was an event held on December 6, 2003, at the Soboba Casino in San Jacinto, California, United States.

=== Results ===
Main Card
Weight class				Method	Round	Time	Notes
Light Heavyweight	Jeremy Horn (c)	def.	Dean Lister	Decision (Majority)	4	5:00	(Note: For The King of the Cage Light Heavyweight Championship.)
	Larry Landless	def.	Paul Castelloni	Submission (Exhaustion)	1	2:58
	Harris Sarmiento	def.	Logan Layton	Submission (Strikes)	1	3:08
	Jimmy Smith	def.	Matt Stansell	Decision	2	5:00
	Manny Reyes Jr.	def.	Jason Dickson	Submission	1	0:55
	Shad Smith	def.	Victor Valenzuela	Decision (Unanimous)	2	5:00
	JJ Pugsley	def.	Brett Mackey	Submission (Choke)	1	1:32
	Carlos Garcia	def.	David Gallegos	TKO (Corner Stoppage)	1	5:00
	Josh Gaskins	def.	Tony Llamas	Submission (Armbar)	1	4:35
	Mike Seal	def.	Michael Martin	TKO	1	0:23
	Gus Enriquez	def.	Reggie Orr	Decision (Unanimous)	2	5:00
	Manny Tapia	def.	Manuel Sawyze	Submission (Rear Naked Choke)	1	2:07
	Caleb Williams	def.	Gary Ingram	Submission (Triangle Choke)	1	0:34

== See also ==
- King of the Cage
- List of King of the Cage events
- List of King of the Cage champions
