= 2004 in King of the Cage =

Mixed martial arts events

Information
- First date: January 24, 2004
- Last date: December 4, 2004

Events
- Total events: 14

Fights
- Total fights: 187
- Title fights: 10

Chronology
2003 in KOTC	2004 in King of the Cage	2005 in KOTC

The year 2004 is the sixth year in the history of King of the Cage, a mixed martial arts promotion based in the United States. In 2004 King of the Cage held 14 events, KOTC 32: Bringing Heat.

== Title fights ==
Title fights in 2004
Weight class				Method	Round	Time	Event	Notes
Super Heavyweight	Eric Pele (c)	def.	Travis Fulton	Submission (Verbal)	1	1:35	KOTC 32: Bringing Heat	(Note: For the King of the Cage Super Heavyweight Championship.)
Welterweight	Diego Sanchez	def.	Jorge Santiago	Decision (Unanimous)	3	5:00	KOTC 37: Unfinished Business	(Note: For the King of the Cage Welterweight Championship.)
Middleweight	Joey Villasenor	def.	Brian Foster	Submission (Rear Naked Choke)	1	4:25	KOTC 41: Relentless	(Note: For The King of the Cage Middleweight Championship.)
Bantamweight	Frankie Bollinger	def.	Richard Goodman	Submission (Keylock)	1	0:00	KOTC 41: Relentless	(Note: For the King of the Cage Bantamweight Championship.)
Heavyweight	Paul Buentello (c)	def.	Bo Cantrell	KO (Punches)	1	0:45	KOTC 44: Revenge	(Note: For the King of the Cage Heavyweight Championship.)
Welterweight	James Fanshier	def.	Thomas Denny	Decision (Split)	3	5:00	KOTC 44: Revenge	(Note: For the King of the Cage Welterweight Championship.)
Lightweight	Takumi Nakayama	def.	Charlie Kohler	TKO (Punches)	2	2:35	KOTC 44: Revenge	(Note: For the King of the Cage Lightweight Championship.)
Bantamweight	Urijah Faber	def.	Eben Kaneshiro	Submission (Punches)	3	4:33	KOTC 44: Revenge	(Note: For the King of the Cage Bantamweight Championship.)
Super Heavyweight	Lloyd Marshbanks	def.	Jerry Vrbanovic	Decision (Majority)	3	5:00	KOTC 44: Revenge	(Note: For the King of the Cage Super Heavyweight Championship.)
Middleweight	Joey Villasenor (c)	def.	Jorge Ortiz	Submission (Strikes)	1	3:19	KOTC: Hostile Takeover	(Note: For The King of the Cage Middleweight Championship.)

== Events list ==
#	Event title	Date	Arena	Location
45	KOTC: Hostile Takeover	December 4, 2004	Sky City Casino	Acoma, New Mexico
44	KOTC 45: King of the Cage 45	November 20, 2004	Belterra Casino Resort & Spa	Belterra, Indiana
43	KOTC 44: Revenge	November 14, 2004	Soboba Casino	San Jacinto, California
42	KOTC: Sunland Park	October 29, 2004	Sunland Park Racetrack & Casino	Sunland Park, New Mexico
41	KOTC 42: Buckeye Nuts	October 23, 2004	Hara Arena	Dayton, Ohio
40	KOTC 41: Relentless	September 29, 2004	Soboba Casino	San Jacinto, California
39	KOTC: New Mexico	August 28, 2004	Sky City Casino	Albuquerque, New Mexico
38	KOTC 39: Hitmaster	August 6, 2004	Soboba Casino	San Jacinto, California
37	KOTC 37: Unfinished Business	June 12, 2004	Soboba Casino	San Jacinto, California
36	KOTC 36: Albuquerque	May 15, 2004	Sky City Casino	Albuquerque, New Mexico
35	KOTC 35: Acoma	February 28, 2004	Sky City Casino	Acoma, New Mexico
34	KOTC 34: Ohio	February 28, 2004	Canton Memorial Civic Center	Canton, Ohio
33	KOTC 33: After Shock	February 20, 2004	Soboba Casino	San Jacinto, California
32	KOTC 32: Bringing Heat	January 24, 2004	N/A	Miami, Florida

== KOTC 32: Bringing Heat ==
KOTC 32: Bringing Heat was an event held on January 24, 2004 in Miami, Florida, United States.

=== Results ===
Main Card
Weight class				Method	Round	Time	Notes
	Marvin Eastman	def.	Vernon White	Decision (Unanimous)	3	5:00
Super Heavyweight	Eric Pele (c)	def.	Travis Fulton	Submission (Verbal)	1	1:35	(Note: For the King of the Cage Super Heavyweight Championship.)
	Seth Petruzelli	def.	Dan Severn	Decision (Unanimous)	3	5:00
	Jorge Santiago	def.	John Cronk	Submission (Armbar)	2	0:54
	Manny Reyes Jr.	def.	Eric O'Brien	Decision (Unanimous)	2	5:00
	Jake Short	def.	Scott Bills	Decision (Unanimous)	2	5:00
	Todd Carney	def.	Jorge Pereira	KO (Punch)	1	1:31
	Rory Singer	def.	Wilson Gouveia	KO (Knee)	2	4:55
	Crafton Wallace	def.	Mike Quinlan	Submission (Guillotine Choke)	1	3:13
	Marcel Ferreira	def.	Charles McCarthy	Decision (Majority)	2	5:00
	Brent Carraway	def.	Roger Krahl	Decision (Majority)	2	5:00
	Stu Hesselmeyer	def.	George Crawford	Decision (Unanimous)	2	5:00
	Danny Byrket	def.	Joe Cervantes	Decision (Unanimous)	2	5:00

== KOTC 33: After Shock ==
KOTC 33: After Shock was an event held on February 20, 2004 at the Soboba Casino in San Jacinto, California, United States.

=== Results ===
Main Card
Weight class				Method	Round	Time	Notes
	Manny Tapia	vs.	Chad Washburn	Draw	2	5:00
	Dale Breese	def.	Cesar Moreno	TKO (Punches)	1	0:35
	Umar Luv	def.	Gus Ambrozic	TKO (Leg Injury)	1	4:32
	Matt Stansell	def.	Logan Layton	TKO (Punches)	1	3:22
	Richard Solis	def.	Carlos Garcia	Decision	2	5:00
	Joe Stevenson	def.	Joe Camacho	Submission (Guillotine Choke)	2	4:36
	Charles Bennett	def.	Shad Smith	KO (Punches)	1	0:40
	Jerry Vrbanovic	vs.	Dan Severn	Draw	2	5:00
	Charlie Valencia	def.	Bobby Gamboa	Decision	3	5:00
	Thomas Denny	def.	Jake Gomez	Submission (Triangle Choke)	1	2:15
	Romie Aram	def.	Mike Penalber	Decision	2	5:00
	Brian Foster	def.	Dusty Arden	Submission (Rear-Naked Choke)	1	3:19
	Chad Davis	def.	Mike Seal	Submission (Triangle Choke)	2	1:47
	Brian Sesma	def.	Bryan Pardoe	TKO (Punches)	1	2:27
	Thomas Kenney	def.	Ray Elbe	Submission (Kimura)	1	2:36
	Larry Landless	def.	Tony Berg	Submission (Rear-Naked Choke)	1	1:41
	Randy Velarde	def.	Bryson Vanderboard	Submission (Punches)	1	4:57
	Wander Braga	def.	Jason Cleveland	Submission (Armbar)	1	1:14

== KOTC 34: Ohio ==
KOTC 34: Ohio was an event held on February 28, 2004 at the Canton Memorial Civic Center in Canton, Ohio, United States.

=== Results ===
Main Card
Weight class				Method	Round	Time	Notes
	Spencer Canup	def.	Jason Keaton	Submission (Rear-Naked Choke)	1	N/A
	Tony Sylvester	def.	Brion Peoples	Submission	1	N/A
	Josh Souder	def.	Brad Mohler	Submission (Armbar)	1	N/A
	Eddie Sanchez	def.	Jeremiah Pocock	Submission (Rear-Naked Choke)	2	N/A
	Tait Fletcher	def.	Shane Schartzer	TKO (Punches)	1	N/A
	Jason Dent	def.	Matt Brady	Submission (Armbar)	1	N/A
	Forrest Petz	def.	Mike O'Donnell	TKO (Punches)	1	N/A
	Dorian Price	def.	Drew Longshore	Submission (Triangle Choke)	1	N/A
	Josh Hendricks	def.	Jonathan Westfall	Submission (Rear-Naked Choke)	1	N/A
	Jeff Cox	def.	Mike Russo	KO (Punch)	1	N/A
	Fred Parrish	def.	Jamie Toney	Submission (Guillotine Choke)	1	N/A

== KOTC 35: Acoma ==
KOTC 35: Acoma was an event held on February 28, 2004 at the Sky City Casino in Acoma, New Mexico, United States.

=== Results ===
Main Card
Weight class				Method	Round	Time	Notes
	Jesse Stanich	def.	Ben Vasques	Submission (Rear-Naked Choke)	1	N/A
	Darrel Priddy	def.	Andy Maccarone	Submission (Punches)	1	N/A
	Tom Cress	def.	Del Hawkins	Submission (Achilles Lock)	1	N/A
	Isaac Vallie-Flagg	def.	Danny Wren	Decision (Unanimous)	2	5:00
	Ed Tomaselli	def.	Leo Okedays	Submission (Punches)	1	N/A
	Brant Gibbs	def.	Richie Reyes	Submission (Triangle Choke)	1	N/A
	Carlos Condit	def.	Jarvis Brennaman	Submission (Rear-Naked Choke)	1	0:34
	Diego Sanchez	def.	Cruz Chacon	Submission (Rear-Naked Choke)	1	0:41
	Chris Avila	def.	Michael Perales	Submission (Punches)	1	N/A

== KOTC 36: Albuquerque ==
KOTC 36: Albuquerque was an event held on May 15, 2004 at the Sky City Casino in Albuquerque, New Mexico, United States.

=== Results ===
Main Card
Weight class				Method	Round	Time	Notes
	Alberto Crane	def.	John Mahlow	Submission (Choke)	2	2:41
	Diego Sanchez	def.	Ray Elbe	Submission (Punches)	1	1:07
	Darrel Priddy	def.	Jimmy Westfall	Submission (Rear-Naked Choke)	1	1:45
	Javier Gil	def.	Hector Escarte	TKO (Punches)	1	1:23
	Al Delgado	def.	Benji Vazques	KO (Punch)	1	0:27
	Tom Pless	def.	Leo Uriquez	Submission (Triangle Choke)	1	2:20
	Johnathan Olivas	def.	Damien Rippee	Submission (Rear-Naked Choke)	1	0:46
	Jerome Martinez	def.	Paul Smiley	Submission (Guillotine Choke)	1	1:12
	Ray Merino	def.	Sean Bellamy	TKO (Punches)	1	3:16

== KOTC 37: Unfinished Business ==
KOTC 37: Unfinished Business was an event held on June 12, 2004 at the Soboba Casino in San Jacinto, California, United States.

=== Results ===
Main Card
Weight class				Method	Round	Time	Notes
	Charles Bennett	def.	William Sriyapai	Decision (Unanimous)	2	5:00
Welterweight	Diego Sanchez	def.	Jorge Santiago	Decision (Unanimous)	3	5:00	(Note: For the King of the Cage Welterweight Championship.)
	Thomas Denny	def.	Tony Llamas	Submission (Rear-Naked Choke)	1	1:33
	Mike Seal	vs.	Reggie Orr	Draw	2	5:00
	Wander Braga	def.	Joe Camacho	Decision	2	5:00
	Brian Foster	def.	Scott Sepulveda	Submission (Rear-Naked Choke)	1	3:10
	Brian Sesma	def.	Go Go Sanchez	Submission (Armbar)	1	1:16
	Richard Goodman	def.	Bobby Gamboa	Submission (Guillotine Choke)	1	3:17
	Dave Rivas	def.	Dave Hisquierdo	Decision (Unanimous)	2	5:00
	Joe Crilly	def.	Paul Cid	TKO (Punches)	1	1:26
	Joe Frainee	def.	John De La O	TKO (Punches)	1	3:19
	Tony Petarra	def.	Ron Cushen	TKO (Punches)	1	1:30
	Thomas Kenney	def.	Jorge Pereira	Decision (Unanimous)	2	5:00
	Frankie Bollinger	def.	Billy Saunders	TKO (Punches)	1	1:40
	Ernie Perea	def.	Harry Rodgers	Submission (Guillotine Choke)	1	0:57
	Manny Tapia	def.	Michael Welty	KO (Punch)	1	0:07
	Jake Gomez	def.	Michael Tetarra	KO (Punch)	1	0:15
	Tony Berg	def.	Gary Mendoza	Submission (Choke)	1	N/A

== KOTC 39: Hitmaster ==
KOTC 39: Hitmaster was an event held on August 6, 2004 at the Soboba Casino in San Jacinto, California, United States.

=== Results ===
Main Card
Weight class				Method	Round	Time	Notes
	Larry Landless	def.	Manny Rodriguez	Decision (Unanimous)	2	5:00
	Fernando Gonzalez	def.	Scott Sepulveda	TKO (Punches)	1	3:28
	Jimmy Smith	def.	James Wilks	Submission (Kneebar)	1	1:40
	Nick Davanzo	def.	Butch Wilkinson	Submission (Rear-Naked Choke)	1	1:46
	Eben Kaneshiro	def.	Jake Hyten	Submission (Armbar)	1	2:40
	Takumi Nakayama	def.	Charles Bennett	Submission (Rear-Naked Choke)	1	2:46
	Jerry Vrbanovic	def.	Julius Askew	Submission (Punches)	1	2:00
	Charlie Kohler	def.	Steve Ewing	TKO (Punches)	1	0:34
	Gregg Dalton	def.	Mike Kawamura	TKO (Knee Injury)	1	2:38
	Bobby Hoffman	def.	Ruben Villareal	Submission (Armbar)	1	4:02
	Ron Short	def.	Baki Baki	TKO (Punches)	1	1:21
	Herb Dean	def.	Timothy Mendoza	TKO (Knee and Punches)	2	3:31
	Preston Rawlings	def.	Tedd McDonald	TKO (Corner Stoppage)	1	5:00
	Dave Terrel	def.	Greg McIntyre	Decision (Unanimous)	2	5:00
	Frankie Bollinger	def.	Dave Schultz	TKO (Punches)	1	0:46
	Paul Arras	def.	Andrew Burley	KO (Punch)	1	0:25
	Andres Gomez	def.	Tony Berg	TKO (Punches)	1	4:02
	Andy Murad	def.	Ray Lizama	Decision (Majority)	2	5:00

== KOTC: New Mexico ==
KOTC: New Mexico was an event held on August 28, 2004 at the Sky City Casino in Albuquerque, New Mexico, United States.

=== Results ===
Main Card
Weight class				Method	Round	Time	Notes
	Joey Villasenor	def.	Hank Weiss	KO	1	0:05
	Dan Christison	def.	Lemuel Vincent	TKO	0	0:00
	Sarah Boyd	def.	Adrian Thompson	TKO	1	0:28
	Danny Higgins	def.	RJ Gamez	Submission (Triangle Choke)	1	0:00
	Gabe Rivas	def.	Ray Elbe	KO	1	0:00
	Jorge Ortiz	def.	Al Delgado	KO	1	0:00
	Jeremy Brown	def.	Brian Schall	Submission (Triangle Choke)	1	0:00

== KOTC 41: Relentless ==
KOTC 41: Relentless was an event held on September 29, 2004 at the Soboba Casino in San Jacinto, California, United States.

=== Results ===
Main Card
Weight class				Method	Round	Time	Notes
	Mike Ancheta	def.	Lee Petacue	Submission	1	1:26
	Tom Roden	def.	Mark McClelland	Submission	1	3:04
	Jerry Davis	def.	Dan Jones	Submission	1	0:34
	Fernando Gonzalez	def.	Travis Goodman	KO (Punch)	1	0:25
Middleweight	Joey Villasenor	def.	Brian Foster	Submission (Rear Naked Choke)	1	4:25	(Note: For The King of the Cage Middleweight Championship.)
Bantamweight	Frankie Bollinger	def.	Richard Goodman	Submission (Keylock)	1	1:45	(Note: For the King of the Cage Bantamweight Championship.)
	Urijah Faber	def.	Rami Boukai	Decision (Majority)	2	5:00
	Brian Sesma	def.	Ron Short	TKO	1	2:12
	Robert Emerson	def.	Joe Camacho	Decision (Unanimous)	2	5:00
	Harris Sarmiento	def.	Johnathan Olivas	TKO	1	1:45
	James Wilks	def.	Ray Lizama	TKO (Doctor Stoppage)	1	1:14
	Dave Hisquierdo	def.	Matt Barrazza	Submission (Rear Naked Choke)	1	0:00
	Joe Frainee	def.	Jake Gomez	TKO	1	2:28
	Matt Stansell	def.	John De La O	TKO	1	2:40
	Manny Tapia	def.	Ed Newalu	Decision (Unanimous)	2	5:00
	Reggie Cardiel	def.	Paul Karsky	TKO	1	0:45

== KOTC 42: Buckeye Nuts ==
KOTC 42: Buckeye Nuts was an event held on October 23, 2004 at the Hara Arena in Dayton, Ohio, United States.

=== Results ===
Main Card
Weight class				Method	Round	Time	Notes
	Michael Buchkovich	def.	Brandon Quigley	KO (Punch)	1	N/A
	John Dixson	def.	Don Richards	Submission (Guillotine Choke)	1	N/A
	Dan Swift	def.	Matt Horning	Submission (Guillotine Choke)	1	N/A
	Jeff Cox	def.	Jake Short	Submission (Choke)	1	N/A
	Dorian Price	def.	Salazar Sanchez	Submission (Triangle Choke)	1	N/A
	Josh Souder	def.	Donny Walker	Submission (Heel Hook)	2	N/A
	Jay Estrada	def.	Luke Spencer	Submission (Guillotine Choke)	1	N/A
	David Heath	def.	Doug Sour	Submission (Achilles Lock)	1	N/A
	Braden Workman	def.	David Stone	Submission (Guillotine Choke)	1	N/A
	Tom Jones	def.	Leo Sylvest	TKO (Punches)	1	N/A
	Sean Huffman	def.	Eli Ayars	Decision (Unanimous)	2	5:00
	Jamie Toney	def.	Drew Longshore	TKO (Punches)	1	N/A
	Jason Gilliam	def.	Dwight Decker	TKO (Punches)	1	0:32
	Ryan Stout	def.	Mike Russo	TKO (Punches)	1	N/A
	Dustin Hazelett	def.	Justin Hons	Submission (Armbar)	1	N/A

== KOTC: Sunland Park ==
KOTC: Sunland Park was an event held on October 29, 2004 at the Sunland Park Racetrack & Casino in Sunland Park, New Mexico, United States.

=== Results ===
Main Card
Weight class				Method	Round	Time	Notes
	Richard Villa	def.	Mike Hollow	Submission (Rear Naked Choke)	1	3:07
	Robert Hughly	def.	Filo Facket	TKO	1	3:04
	Justin Reyes	def.	Dave Dominguez	Submission	1	3:46
	Marcos Rodriguez	def.	Paul Filasen	Submission (Strikes)	1	2:45
	Patrick Dixon	def.	Mike Nelson	TKO	1	4:05
	Gilbert Carreto	def.	Ray Vaiza	Submission (Strikes)	1	1:08
	Theo McDonald	def.	Jeff Novalez	TKO	1	1:51
	Cuiz Martinez	def.	Gilbert Soto	Submission (Rear Naked Choke)	1	1:00
	Adam Vasquez	def.	Wesley Harding	Submission (Rear Naked Choke)	1	3:57
	Jorge Cervantez	def.	Charles Rushing	Submission	1	1:28
	Miguel Gutierrez	def.	Albert Martinez	Submission (Strikes)	1	3:19
	Michael Chupa	def.	Randy Hines	Submission (Armbar)	1	0:34

== KOTC 44: Revenge ==
KOTC 44: Revenge was an event held on November 14, 2004 at the Soboba Casino in San Jacinto, California, United States.

=== Results ===
Main Card
Weight class				Method	Round	Time	Notes
	Alex Richard	def.	Paul Karsky	Submission	1	3:42
	Jeff Clark	def.	Tony Llamas	Submission (Triangle Choke)	1	0:45
	Sost Infante	def.	Jose Ramirez	TKO (Doctor Stoppage)	2	2:08
	Robert Breslin	def.	Frank Guerrero	Submission (Rear-Naked Choke)	1	4:17
	Fernando Gonzalez	def.	Reggie Orr	Submission (Injury)	2	2:38
	Frankie Bollinger	def.	Billy Thompson	TKO (Punches)	1	1:40
Heavyweight	Paul Buentello (c)	def.	Bo Cantrell	KO (Punches)	1	0:45	(Note: For the King of the Cage Heavyweight Championship.)
Welterweight	James Fanshier	def.	Thomas Denny	Decision (Split)	3	5:00	(Note: For the King of the Cage Welterweight Championship.)
Lightweight	Takumi Nakayama	def.	Charlie Kohler	TKO (Punches)	2	2:35	(Note: For the King of the Cage Lightweight Championship.)
Bantamweight	Urijah Faber	def.	Eben Kaneshiro	Submission (Punches)	3	4:33	(Note: For the King of the Cage Bantamweight Championship.)
Super Heavyweight	Lloyd Marshbanks	def.	Jerry Vrbanovic	Decision (Majority)	3	5:00	(Note: For the King of the Cage Super Heavyweight Championship.)
	Dave Hisquierdo	def.	Charles Bennett	Submission (Triangle Choke)	2	1:56
	Cal Worsham	def.	Will Scott	TKO (Punches)	1	0:52
	Anthony Ruiz	def.	Brian Sesma	TKO (Retirement)	1	5:00
	Shonie Carter	def.	John Cronk	TKO (Doctor Stoppage)	1	5:00
	Randy Velarde	def.	Robert Emerson	Decision (Majority)	2	5:00
	Russ Miura	def.	Hiroyuki Abe	No Contest	1	2:29
	Michael Guymon	def.	Joe Frainee	Submission (Punches)	1	2:22
	Ray Lizama	def.	Richard Villa	Submission (Choke)	1	4:31

== KOTC 45: King of the Cage 45 ==
KOTC 45: King of the Cage 45 was an event held on November 20, 2004 at the Belterra Casino Resort & Spa in Belterra, Indiana, United States.

=== Results ===
Main Card
Weight class				Method	Round	Time	Notes
	Shonie Carter	def.	Buddy Clinton	NC (Confusion Over Fight Length)	2	5:00
	Travis Fulton	def.	Don Richards	TKO (Corner Stoppage)	1	5:00
	Forrest Petz	def.	Rhomez Brower	KO (Punches)	1	N/A
	Allan Weickert	def.	Gary Myers	Submission (Punches)	1	N/A
	Jeff Cox	def.	Sean Huffman	Decision (Unanimous)	2	5:00
	Dan Swift	def.	Jeremy Bolt	Submission (Guillotine Choke)	2	N/A
	Darrell Smith	def.	Andre Garcia	Submission (Rear-Naked Choke)	2	N/A
	Mike Boyd	def.	Jason Bryant	Decision (Majority)	2	5:00
	Nick Ollbending	def.	Doug Sour	TKO (Punches)	1	N/A
	Jesse Chilton	def.	Rory Prazak	KO (Punches)	1	N/A
	Scott Hope	def.	Josh Souder	Decision (Unanimous)	2	5:00

== KOTC: Hostile Takeover ==
KOTC: Hostile Takeover was an event held on December 4, 2004 at the Sky City Casino in Acoma, New Mexico, United States.

=== Results ===
Main Card
Weight class				Method	Round	Time	Notes
Middleweight	Joey Villasenor (c)	def.	Jorge Ortiz	Submission (Strikes)	1	3:19	(Note: For The King of the Cage Middleweight Championship.)
	Jimmy Westfall	def.	Josh Rosas	Submission (Rear Naked Choke)	1	0:25
	Al Delgado	def.	Jarome Sierra	Submission (Rear Naked Choke)	1	0:43
	James Martinez	def.	Patrick Dixon	Submission (Rear Naked Choke)	1	1:15
	Ed Tomaselli	def.	Zac White	TKO	1	1:23
	Brian Schall	def.	Michael Gonzalez	Submission (Rear Naked Choke)	1	1:48
	Danny Higgins	def.	Gabe Rivas	Submission (Armbar)	1	1:50
	Eric McElroy	def.	Ray Vaiza	Submission (Strikes)	1	0:31
	Victor Hernandez	def.	Leo Uriquez	Submission	1	1:58
	Joshua Gross	def.	Josh Trujillo	TKO	1	3:05
	Richard Villa	def.	Eric Kucevic	Submission (Strikes)	1	3:05

== See also ==
- King of the Cage
- List of King of the Cage events
- List of King of the Cage champions
