= 2001 in King of the Cage =

Mixed martial arts events

Information
- First date: February 24, 2001
- Last date: September 29, 2001

Events
- Total events: 5

Fights
- Total fights: 65
- Title fights: 7

Chronology
2000 in KOTC	2001 in King of the Cage	2002 in KOTC

The year 2001 is the third year in the history of King of the Cage, a mixed martial arts promotion based in The United States. In 2001 King of the Cage held 5 events, KOTC 7: Wet and Wild.

== Title fights ==
Title fights in 2001
Weight class				Method	Round	Time	Event	Notes
Light Heavyweight	Vernon White	def.	Marvin Eastman	Decision (Split)	3	5:00	KOTC 8: Bombs Away	(Note: For The King of the Cage Light Heavyweight Championship.)
Super Heavyweight	Bobby Hoffman	def.	Kauai Kupihea	Submission (Punches)	2	4:00	KOTC 9: Showtime	(Note: For The King of the Cage Super Heavyweight Championship.)
Lightweight	Javier Vazquez	def.	Philip Perez	Technical Submission (Triangle Choke)	2	3:58	KOTC 10: Critical Mass	(Note: For The King of the Cage Lightweight Championship.)
Middleweight	Chris Brennan	def.	Kevin Hogan	Submission (Armbar)	2	1:08	KOTC 10: Critical Mass	(Note: For The King of the Cage Middleweight Championship.)
Welterweight	Joe Stevenson (c)	def.	Ryan Painter	Decision (Split)	2	5:00	KOTC 10: Critical Mass	(Note: For The King of the Cage Welterweight Championship.)
Light Heavyweight	Vernon White (c)	def.	James Lee	Submission (Heel Hook)	3	1:00	KOTC 11: Domination	(Note: For The King of the Cage Light Heavyweight Championship.)
Middleweight	Chris Brennan (c)	def.	Steve Berger	Decision (Unanimous)	3	5:00	KOTC 11: Domination	(Note: For The King of the Cage Middleweight Championship.)

== Events list ==
#	Event Title	Date	Arena	Location
11	KOTC 11: Domination	September 29, 2001	Soboba Casino	San Jacinto, California
10	KOTC 10: Critical Mass	August 4, 2001	Soboba Casino	San Jacinto, California
9	KOTC 9: Showtime	June 23, 2001	Soboba Casino	San Jacinto, California
8	KOTC 8: Bombs Away	April 29, 2001	Colusa Casino	Colusa, California
7	KOTC 7: Wet and Wild	February 24, 2001	Soboba Casino	San Jacinto, California

== KOTC 7: Wet and Wild ==
KOTC 7: Wet and Wild was an event held on February 24, 2001 at the Soboba Casino in San Jacinto, California, United States.

=== Results ===
Main Card
Weight class				Method	Round	Time	Notes
	Ricco Rodriguez	def.	Paul Buentello	Submission (Kneebar)	2	4:21
	Pete Williams	def.	Rick Mathis	TKO (Corner Stoppage)	1	5:00
	Joe Hurley	def.	Charlie Kohler	Decision (Split)	3	5:00
	Jeremy Williams	def.	Yves Edwards	Decision (Split)	3	5:00
	Guy Mezger	def.	Alexander Otsuka	TKO (Doctor Stoppage)	2	1:57
	Rafiel Torre	def.	Ioka Tianuu	Submission (Kneebar)	1	1:56
	Alex Andrade	def.	Yusuke Imamura	Submission (Punches)	1	2:46
	Marvin Eastman	def.	Floyd Sword	Decision (Split)	3	5:00
	Jacen Flynn	def.	Dean Lister	Decision (Split)	2	5:00
	Reggie Cardiel	vs.	Tony Galindo	Draw	2	5:00
	Shungo Oyama	def.	Mike Bourke	KO (Punch)	1	0:17
	Victor Hunsaker	def.	Kevin Hogan	Submission (Armbar)	1	4:36
	Tony Huecias	def.	Alex Richard	TKO (Corner Stoppage)	1	5:00

== KOTC 8: Bombs Away ==
KOTC 8: Bombs Away was an event held on April 29, 2001 at the Colusa Casino in Williams, California, United States.

=== Results ===
Main Card
Weight class				Method	Round	Time	Notes
Light Heavyweight	Vernon White	def.	Marvin Eastman	Decision (Split)	3	5:00	(Note: For The King of the Cage Light Heavyweight Championship.)
	Gil Castillo	def.	Joe Hurley	Decision (Unanimous)	3	5:00
	Sean Sherk	def.	Marty Armendarez	TKO (Punches)	3	2:07
	Quinton Jackson	def.	Bryson Haubrick	Submission (Punches)	1	1:48	(Note: For the King of the Cage Light Heavyweight Superfight Championship.)
	Daijiro Matsui	def.	Rick Kerns	Decision (Unanimous)	2	5:00
	Phillip Miller	def.	Shungo Oyama	TKO (Punches)	2	3:00
	Ronald Jhun	def.	Brian Sleeman	Submission (Armbar)	2	2:03
	Floyd Sword	def.	Sokun Koh	Decision (Unanimous)	2	5:00
	Greg Mayer	def.	Bao Quach	KO (Punches)	1	0:17
	Jeremy Edwards	def.	Edwin Dewees	Decision (Unanimous)	2	5:00
	Anthony Ramos	def.	Chad Washburn	TKO (Punches)	1	2:44

== KOTC 9: Showtime ==
KOTC 9: Showtime was an event held on June 23, 2001 at the Soboba Casino in San Jacinto, California, United States.

=== Results ===
Main Card
Weight class				Method	Round	Time	Notes
Super Heavyweight	Bobby Hoffman	def.	Kauai Kupihea	Submission (Punches)	2	4:00	(Note: For The King of the Cage Super Heavyweight Championship.)
	Eric Pele	def.	Sean Alvarez	KO (Punch)	3	0:27
	Brian Foster	def.	Amir Rahnavardi	TKO (Punches)	1	4:22
	Tim Catalfo	def.	Dave Beneteau	Submission (Choke)	1	0:25
	Mike Bourke	def.	Roger Godinez	Decision	2	5:00
	Victor Hunsaker	def.	Patrick Lebreton	Submission (Triangle Choke)	1	0:36
	Tony Galindo	def.	Reggie Cardiel	Decision	2	5:00
	Jason Lambert	def.	Rick Mathis	TKO (Punches)	1	4:30
	Javier Vazquez	def.	Farrell Frisby	Submission (Heel Hook)	1	0:38
	Thomas Denny	def.	Mike Lee	TKO (Retirement)	1	5:00
	Eiji Mitsuoka	def.	Gerald Strebendt	Submission (Punches)	1	2:23
	Katsumi Usuta	def.	Shannon Ritch	Submission (Heel Hook)	1	2:20
	Bao Quach	def.	Kenneth Tenorio	Submission (Armbar)	1	2:54

== KOTC 10: Critical Mass ==
KOTC 10: Critical Mass was an event held on August 4, 2001 in California, United States.

=== Results ===
Main Card
Weight class				Method	Round	Time	Notes
Lightweight	Javier Vazquez	def.	Philip Perez	Technical Submission (Triangle Choke)	2	3:58	(Note: For The King of the Cage Lightweight Championship.)
Middleweight	Chris Brennan	def.	Kevin Hogan	Submission (Armbar)	2	1:08	(Note: For The King of the Cage Middleweight Championship.)
	Duane Ludwig	def.	Charles Bennett	Submission (Exhaustion)	2	2:38
	Sokun Koh	def.	Sean Gray	Decision (Split)	2	5:00
Welterweight	Joe Stevenson (c)	def.	Ryan Painter	Decision (Split)	2	5:00	(Note: For The King of the Cage Welterweight Championship.)
	Tracy Hess	def.	Joe Camacho	Decision (Unanimous)	2	5:00
	Kauai Kupihea	def.	Mike Bourke	Submission (Injury)	1	0:40
	Mike Bourke	def.	Keith Richardson	Decision (Unanimous)	1	7:00
	Kauai Kupihea	def.	Wade Shipp	TKO (Corner Stoppage)	1	6:00
	Mike Bourke	def.	Eric Kleper	Submission (Punches)	1	1:05
	Zane Frazier	def.	Takayuki Okada	Decision (Unanimous)	1	7:00
	Kauai Kupihea	def.	Josh Dempsey	Decision (Split)	1	7:00
	Wade Shipp	def.	Fred Floyd	Submission (Armbar)	1	0:24
	Ioka Tianuu	def.	Touradj Manouri	TKO (Punches)	1	0:16
	Keith Richardson	def.	Richard Marino	Decision (Unanimous)	1	7:00

== KOTC 11: Domination ==
KOTC 11: Domination was an event held on September 29, 2001 at the Soboba Casino in San Jacinto, California, United States.

=== Results ===
Main Card
Weight class				Method	Round	Time	Notes
	Bobby Hoffman	def.	Tim Catalfo	Submission (Strikes)	1	3:56
Light Heavyweight	Vernon White (c)	def.	James Lee	Submission (Heel Hook)	3	1:00	(Note: For The King of the Cage Light Heavyweight Championship.)
Middleweight	Chris Brennan (c)	def.	Steve Berger	Decision (Unanimous)	3	5:00	(Note: For The King of the Cage Middleweight Championship.)
	Eric Pele	def.	Kauai Kupihea	Submission (Strikes)	1	1:40
	Jong Wang Kim	def.	Jason Lambert	Submission (Guillotine Choke)	1	0:55
	Betiss Mansouri	vs.	Eiji Mitsuoka	Draw	3	5:00
	John Alessio	def.	Thomas Denny	Submission (Keylock)	1	1:55
	Romie Aram	def.	Jeff Lindsay	Submission (Arm-Triangle Choke)	1	4:00
	Charlie Kohler	def.	Danny Byrket	Submission (Armbar)	1	2:12
	Dean Lister	def.	Jerry Jenkins	Submission (Heel Hook)	1	4:24
	Charlie Valencia	def.	Bobby Gamboa	Submission (Shoulder Dislocated from Slam)	1	0:41
	Brian Warren	def.	Rudy Duran	Submission (Armbar)	1	1:12
	Sost Infante	def.	Mark McClelland	Submission (Strikes)	2	1:56

== See also ==
- List of King of the Cage events
- List of King of the Cage champions
