= 2006 in Strikeforce =

Mixed martial arts events

Information
- First date: March 10, 2006
- Last date: December 8, 2006

Events
- Total events: 4

Fights
- Total fights: 47
- Title fights: 5

Chronology
2006 in Strikeforce	2007 in Strikeforce

The year 2006 was the 1st year in the history of Strikeforce, a mixed martial arts promotion based in the United States. In 2006 Strikeforce held 4 events beginning with, Strikeforce: Shamrock vs. Gracie.

== Title fights ==
Title fights in 2006
Weight class				Method	Round	Time	Event	Notes
Lightweight	Clay Guida	def.	Josh Thomson	Decision (Unanimous)	5	5:00	Strikeforce: Shamrock vs. Gracie	(Note: For the Strikeforce Lightweight Championship.)
Lightweight	Gilbert Melendez	def.	Clay Guida (c)	Decision (Split)	5	5:00	Strikeforce: Revenge	(Note: For the Strikeforce Lightweight Championship.)
Light Heavyweight	Bobby Southworth	def.	Vernon White	unanimous decision	3	5:00	Strikeforce: Triple Threat	(Note: For the Strikeforce Light Heavyweight Championship.)
Lightweight	Josh Thomson	def.	Nam Phan	unanimous decision	3	5:00	Strikeforce: Triple Threat	(Note: For the Strikeforce Lightweight U.S. Championship.)
Middleweight	Eugene Jackson	def.	Ronald Jhun	submission (rear naked choke)	1	2:01	Strikeforce: Triple Threat	(Note: For the Strikeforce Middleweight U.S. Championship.)

== Events list ==
#	Event title	Date	Arena	Location	Attendance	Broadcast
4	Strikeforce: Triple Threat	December 8, 2006	HP Pavilion at San Jose	San Jose, California	8,701	
3	Strikeforce: Tank vs. Buentello	October 7, 2006	Save Mart Center	Fresno, California	4,437	
2	Strikeforce: Revenge	June 9, 2006	HP Pavilion at San Jose	San Jose, California	10,374	
1	Strikeforce: Shamrock vs. Gracie	March 10, 2006	HP Pavilion at San Jose	San Jose, California	18,265	

== Strikeforce: Shamrock vs. Gracie ==
Strikeforce: Shamrock vs. Gracie was an event held on March 10, 2006 at the HP Pavilion at San Jose in San Jose, California.

=== Results ===
Main Card
Weight class				Method	Round	Time	Notes
Lightweight	Clay Guida	def.	Josh Thomson	Decision (Unanimous)	5	5:00	(Note: For the Strikeforce Lightweight Championship.)
Middleweight	Frank Shamrock	def.	Cesar Gracie	KO (Punches)	1	0:21
Middleweight	Cung Le	def.	Mike Altman	KO (Punch)	1	3:51
Lightweight	Gilbert Melendez	def.	Harris Sarmiento	Submission (Punches)	2	0:44
Lightweight	Nate Diaz	def.	Tony Juarez	TKO (Punches)	1	3:23
Preliminary card
Middleweight	Eugene Jackson	def.	Jorge Ortiz	Decision (Unanimous)	3	5:00
Heavyweight	Mike Kyle	vs.	Krzysztof Soszynski	Technical Draw (Thumb to Soszynski's Eye)	1	2:02
Light Heavyweight	Brian Ebersole	def.	Matt Horwich	Decision (Unanimous)	3	5:00
Heavyweight	Daniel Puder	def.	Jesse Fujarczyk	Submission (Rear-Naked Choke)	1	1:54
Middleweight	Crafton Wallace	def.	Ray Routh	KO (Knee)	2	0:35
Middleweight	Scott Graham	def.	Chris Yee	Submission (Rear-Naked Choke)	2	2:37

== Strikeforce: Revenge ==
Strikeforce: Revenge was an event held on June 9, 2006 at the HP Pavilion at San Jose in San Jose, California.

=== Results ===
Main Card
Weight class				Method	Round	Time	Notes
Lightweight	Gilbert Melendez	def.	Clay Guida (c)	Decision (Split)	5	5:00	(Note: For the Strikeforce Lightweight Championship.)
Light Heavyweight	Alistair Overeem	def.	Vitor Belfort	Decision (Unanimous)	3	5:00
Middleweight	Cung Le	def.	Brian Warren	TKO (Punches)	1	4:19
Lightweight	Tyson Griffin	def.	Duane Ludwig	TKO (Punches)	1	3:57
Light Heavyweight	Bobby Southworth	vs.	James Irvin	NC (Both Fighters Fell From Cage)	1	0:17
Lightweight	Clint Coronel	def.	Juan Miranda	Submission (Anaconda Choke)	2	1:43
Preliminary card
Middleweight	Chris Amarante	def.	Sean Bassett	Submission (Armbar)	1	4:37
Lightweight	Josh Thomson	def.	Harris Sarmiento	Submission (Arm-Triangle Choke)	3	3:19
Middleweight	Eugene Jackson	def.	Mike Seal	TKO (Punches)	2	2:49
Heavyweight	Daniel Puder	def.	Tom Tuggle	Submission (Armbar)	1	0:28
Light Heavyweight	Jared Hamman	def.	Scott Graham	TKO (Punches)	2	1:36
Middleweight	Luke Stewart	def.	Bill Duvall	Submission (Armbar)	1	1:15

== Strikeforce: Tank vs. Buentello ==
Strikeforce: Tank vs. Buentello was an event held on October 7, 2006 at the Save Mart Center in Fresno, California.

=== Results ===
Main Card
Weight class				Method	Round	Time	Notes
Heavyweight	Paul Buentello	def.	David Abbott	KO (Punch)	1	0:43
Lightweight	Josh Thomson	def.	Duane Ludwig	Submission (Guillotine Choke)	2	4:36
Light Heavyweight	Trevor Prangley	def.	Anthony Ruiz	Submission (Armbar)	1	4:42
Heavyweight	Cain Velasquez	def.	Jesse Fujarczyk	TKO (Punches)	1	1:58
Preliminary card
Welterweight	Jason Von Flue	def.	Eric Wray	Submission (Arm-Triangle Choke)	2	2:22
Lightweight	Casey Olson	def.	Bobby Sanchez	Submission (Guillotine Choke)	1	1:58
Lightweight	Philip Perez	def.	Brandon Shuey	Submission (Triangle Choke)	1	1:28
Heavyweight	Mike Cook	def.	Carlton Jones	Submission (Punches)	2	2:03
Middleweight	Sam Spengler	def.	Frank Megallon	TKO (Punches)	1	2:38
Middleweight	Luke Stewart	def.	Jeremiah Metcalf	Submission (Rear-Naked Choke)	1	2:29

== Strikeforce: Triple Threat ==
Strikeforce: Triple Threat was an event held on December 8, 2006 at the HP Pavilion at San Jose in San Jose, California.

=== Results ===
Main card
Weight class				Method	Round	Time	Notes
Light Heavyweight	Bobby Southworth	def.	Vernon White	unanimous decision	3	5:00	(Note: For the Strikeforce Light Heavyweight Championship.)
Heavyweight	Paul Buentello	def.	Ruben Villareal	TKO (corner stoppage)	2	3:57
Middleweight	Cung Le	def.	Jason Von Flue	TKO (Doctor Stoppage) 0:43 of round 1	3	5:00
Welterweight	Duane Ludwig	def.	Tony Fryklund	TKO (knee)	2	3:37
Lightweight	Josh Thomson	def.	Nam Phan	unanimous decision	3	5:00	(Note: For the Strikeforce Lightweight U.S. Championship.)
Middleweight	Eugene Jackson	def.	Ronald Jhun	submission (rear naked choke)	1	2:01	(Note: For the Strikeforce Middleweight U.S. Championship.)
Preliminary card
Women's Featherweight	Gina Carano	def.	Elaina Maxwell	unanimous decision	3	5:00
Heavyweight	Daniel Puder	def.	Mike Cook	submission (rear naked choke)	2	2:31
Heavyweight	Rex Richards	def.	Kyle Levinton	submission (kimura)	1	2:02
Lightweight	David Smith	def.	Sean Bassett	TKO (punches)	3	1:36
Catchweight (194 lb)	Scott Graham	def.	Drew Dimanlig	unanimous decision	3	5:00
Bantamweight	Anthony Figueroa	def.	David Barrios	unanimous decision	3	5:00
Middleweight	Raul Castillo	def.	Andrew Montanez	TKO (punches)	1	2:10
Catchweight (179 lb)	Jeffrey Cachia	def.	Abdullah Johari	Submission (rear-naked choke)	1	1:21

== See also ==
- List of Strikeforce champions
- List of Strikeforce events
