= Luke Stewart =

Luke Stewart may refer to:

- Luke Stewart (fighter)
- Luke Stewart (musician)
