= Royce Alger =

American wrestler (born 1965)

- Born: March 6, 1965 (age 61); Iowa City, Iowa, U.S.
- Height: 5 ft 10 in (1.78 m)
- Weight: 200 lb (91 kg; 14 st)
- Division: Light Heavyweight; Middleweight
- Style: Freestyle wrestling
- Team: Hammer House
- Wrestling: NCAA Division I Wrestling

Mixed martial arts record
- Total: 5
- Wins: 3
- By knockout: 2
- By submission: 1
- Losses: 2
- By knockout: 1
- By submission: 1

Other information
- University: University of Iowa
- Mixed martial arts record from Sherdog

Royce Alger (born 1965) is an American former freestyle and folkstyle wrestler and retired mixed martial artist. An athlete of wrestling icon Dan Gable, he went on to become a three-time All-American, three-time Big Ten champion, and two-time NCAA National Champion at the 167 and 177 pound weight classes in 1987 and 1988, at the University of Iowa. After going undefeated in his final 78 matches, Alger spent seven years as an assistant wrestling coach with his alma mater. He was also a World silver medalist in freestyle wrestling at the 1990 World Wrestling Championships.

Alger later competed in mixed martial arts. In his debut at UFC 13 on May 30, 1997, he lost by armlock to Enson Inoue. He won his next three fights, all of which were in smaller, regional MMA events. In his fifth and final fight at UFC 21 on July 16, 1999, he was knocked out by Eugene Jackson.

== Mixed martial arts record ==
Professional record breakdown
5 matches	3 wins	2 losses
By knockout	2	1
By submission	1	1

Res.	Record	Opponent	Method	Event	Date	Round	Time	Location	Notes
Loss	3–2	Eugene Jackson	KO (punch)	UFC 21	July 16, 1999	2	1:19	Cedar Rapids, Iowa, United States	
Win	3–1	Roberto Ramirez	TKO (punches)	Iowa Cage Fighting 1	August 8, 1998	1	4:48	Iowa, United States	
Win	2–1	Craig Pumphrey	TKO (punches)	Extreme Challenge 10	September 4, 1997	1	4:15	Des Moines, Iowa, United States	
Win	1–1	Joe DeFuria	Submission (americana)	Extreme Challenge 9	August 30, 1997	1	1:24	Davenport, Iowa, United States	
Loss	0–1	Enson Inoue	Technical Submission (armbar)	UFC 13	May 30, 1997	1	1:36	Augusta, Georgia, United States	
