= Strikeforce: Revenge =

Strikeforce mixed martial arts event in 2006

- The poster for Strikeforce: Revenge
- Promotion: Strikeforce
- Date: June 9, 2006
- Venue: HP Pavilion at San Jose
- City: San Jose, California
- Attendance: 10,374

Event chronology
Strikeforce: Shamrock vs. Gracie	Strikeforce: Revenge	Strikeforce: Tank vs. Buentello

Strikeforce: Revenge was the second mixed martial arts event promoted by Strikeforce. The event took place at the HP Pavilion at San Jose in San Jose, California on June 9, 2006. The main event featured the North American debut of Alistair Overeem.

== Results ==
Main Card
Weight class				Method	Round	Time	Notes
Light Heavyweight	Alistair Overeem	def.	Vitor Belfort	Decision (Unanimous)	3	5:00
Lightweight	Gilbert Melendez	def.	Clay Guida (c)	Decision (Split)	5	5:00	(Note: For the Strikeforce Lightweight Championship.)
Middleweight	Cung Le	def.	Brian Warren	TKO (Punches)	1	4:19
Lightweight	Tyson Griffin	def.	Duane Ludwig	TKO (Punches)	1	3:57
Light Heavyweight	Bobby Southworth	vs.	James Irvin	NC (Both Fighters Fell From Cage)	1	0:17
Lightweight	Clint Coronel	def.	Juan Miranda	Submission (Anaconda Choke)	2	1:43
Preliminary card
Middleweight	Chris Amarante	def.	Sean Bassett	Submission (Armbar)	1	4:37
Lightweight	Josh Thomson	def.	Harris Sarmiento	Submission (Arm-Triangle Choke)	3	3:19
Middleweight	Eugene Jackson	def.	Mike Seal	TKO (Punches)	2	2:49
Heavyweight	Daniel Puder	def.	Tom Tuggle	Submission (Armbar)	1	0:28
Light Heavyweight	Jared Hamman	def.	Scott Graham	TKO (Punches)	2	1:36
Middleweight	Luke Stewart	def.	Bill Duvall	Submission (Armbar)	1	1:15

== See also ==
- Strikeforce
- List of Strikeforce champions
- List of Strikeforce events
- 2006 in Strikeforce
