= Strikeforce: Playboy Mansion =

Strikeforce mixed martial arts event in 2007

- The poster for Strikeforce: Playboy Mansion
- Promotion: Strikeforce
- Date: September 29, 2007
- Venue: Playboy Mansion
- City: Los Angeles, California
- Attendance: 3,569
- Total purse: $229,183

Event chronology
Strikeforce: Shamrock vs. Baroni	Strikeforce: Playboy Mansion	Strikeforce: Four Men Enter, One Man Survives

Strikeforce: Playboy Mansion was a mixed martial arts event promoted by Strikeforce. The event took place on September 29, 2007, at the Playboy Mansion in Los Angeles, California. The invitation-only event drew nearly 1,000 spectators who paid $1000 per ticket. The event was supervised by the California State Athletic Commission. Fights 5 to 12 were streamed live on Yahoo Sports for free.

== Results ==
Main Card
Weight class				Method	Round	Time	Notes
Light Heavyweight	Bobby Southworth	def.	Bill Mahood	TKO (rib injury)	1	1:15
Lightweight	Gilbert Melendez	def.	Tetsuji Kato	Decision (unanimous) (30-27, 30-27, 30-27)	3	5:00
Middleweight	Joe Riggs	def.	Eugene Jackson	KO (punches)	1	3:56
Lightweight	Josh Thomson	def.	Adam Lynn	TKO (punches)	1	4:45
Lightweight	Billy Evangelista	def.	Clint Coronel	Decision (split) (28-29, 29-28, 30-27)	3	5:00
Catchweight (160 lb)	Jorge Masvidal	def.	Matt Lee	TKO (punches)	1	1:33
Preliminary Card
Catchweight (195 lb)	Falaniko Vitale	def.	Ron Fields	TKO (Submission to punches)	1	3:02
Heavyweight	Daniel Puder	def.	Richard Dalton	Decision (unanimous) (30-27, 30-27, 30-27)	3	5:00
Light Heavyweight	Dewey Cooper	def.	Adam Smith	Decision (unanimous)	3	3:00
Middleweight	Daniel McWilliams	def.	Eddy Millis	Submission (rear-naked choke)	1	2:09
Welterweight	Luke Stewart	def.	Sam Liera	TKO (punches)	1	3:40
Bantamweight	Anthony Figueroa	def.	Miguel Linares	TKO (punches)	1	2:09

== Purses ==
•Gilbert Melendez $30,000 (no win bonus) def. Tetsuji Kato $6,000

•Joe Riggs $29,500 ($15,000 win bonus) def. Eugene Jackson $15,000

•Josh Thomson $24,500 ($10,000 win bonus) def. Adam Lynn $6,000

•Billy Evangelista $6,000 ($3,000 win bonus) def. Clint Coronel $3,000

•Jorge Masvidal $18,182.50 (no win bonus) def. Matt Lee $1,000

•Bobby Southworth $20,000 ($10,000 win bonus) def. Bill Mahood $1,000

•Falaniko Vitale $20,000, (no win bonus) def. Ron Fields $7,000

•Daniel Puder $20,000 (no win bonus) def. Richard Dalton $3,000

•Dewey Cooper $500 (no win bonus) def. Adam Smith $500

•Daniel McWilliams $1,000(no win bonus) def. Eddy Millis $4,000

•Luke Stewart $7,500 ($4,000 win bonus) def. Sam Liera $3,000

The payout totaled $229,183.50.

== See also ==
- Strikeforce
- List of Strikeforce champions
- List of Strikeforce events
- 2007 in Strikeforce
