= Strikeforce: Triple Threat =

Strikeforce mixed martial arts event in 2006

- The poster for Strikeforce: Triple Threat
- Promotion: Strikeforce
- Date: December 8, 2006
- Venue: HP Pavilion at San Jose
- City: San Jose, California
- Attendance: 8,701

Event chronology
Strikeforce: Tank vs. Buentello	Strikeforce: Triple Threat	Strikeforce: Young Guns

Strikeforce: Triple Threat was the fourth mixed martial arts event promoted by Strikeforce. The event took place at the HP Pavilion at San Jose in San Jose, California on December 8, 2006. The main card featured the Strikeforce debut of Gina Carano.

== Results ==
Main card
Weight class				Method	Round	Time	Notes
Light Heavyweight	Bobby Southworth	def.	Vernon White	Decision (unanimous)	5	5:00	(Note: For the inaugural Strikeforce Light Heavyweight Championship.)
Heavyweight	Paul Buentello	def.	Ruben Villareal	TKO (corner stoppage)	2	3:57
Middleweight	Cung Le	def.	Jason Von Flue	TKO (Doctor Stoppage)	1	0:43
Welterweight	Duane Ludwig	def.	Tony Fryklund	TKO (knee)	2	3:37
Lightweight	Josh Thomson	def.	Nam Phan	Decision (unanimous)	3	5:00	(Note: For the Strikeforce U.S. Lightweight Championship. S. Lightweight Champion.)
Middleweight	Eugene Jackson	def.	Ronald Jhun	Submission (rear-naked choke)	1	2:01	(Note: For the Strikeforce U.S. Middleweight Championship.)
Preliminary card
Women's Featherweight	Gina Carano	def.	Elaina Maxwell	Decision (unanimous)	3	2:00
Heavyweight	Daniel Puder	def.	Mike Cook	Submission (rear-naked choke)	2	2:31
Heavyweight	Rex Richards	def.	Kyle Levinton	Submission (kimura)	1	2:02
Lightweight	David Smith	def.	Sean Bassett	TKO (punches)	3	1:36
Catchweight (194 lb)	Scott Graham	def.	Drew Dimanlig	Decision (unanimous)	3	5:00
Bantamweight	Anthony Figueroa	def.	David Barrios	Decision (unanimous)	3	5:00
Middleweight	Raul Castillo	def.	Andrew Montanez	TKO (punches)	1	2:10
Catchweight (179 lb)	Jeffrey Cachia	def.	Abdullah Johari	Submission (rear-naked choke)	1	1:21

== See also ==
- Strikeforce
- List of Strikeforce champions
- List of Strikeforce events
- 2006 in Strikeforce
