= Strikeforce: Shamrock vs. Gracie =

Strikeforce mixed martial arts event in 2006

- The poster for Strikeforce: Shamrock vs. Gracie
- Promotion: Strikeforce
- Date: March 10, 2006
- Venue: HP Pavilion at San Jose
- City: San Jose, California, United States
- Attendance: 18,265

Event chronology
Strikeforce: Shamrock vs. Gracie	Strikeforce: Revenge

Strikeforce: Shamrock vs. Gracie was the inaugural mixed martial arts event promoted by Strikeforce. The event took place at the HP Pavilion at San Jose in San Jose, California on March 10, 2006. The main event was a match between Frank Shamrock, returning to the sport after a 3-year absence, and Cesar Gracie. The show is also notable for featuring the MMA debut of Cung Le. It also saw the return of Daniel Puder, who had returned to MMA after an unsuccessful tenure in the WWE.

== Results ==
Main Card
Weight class				Method	Round	Time	Notes
Middleweight	Frank Shamrock	def.	Cesar Gracie	KO (Punches)	1	0:21
Lightweight	Clay Guida	def.	Josh Thomson	Decision (Unanimous)	5	5:00	(Note: For the inaugural Strikeforce Lightweight Championship.)
Middleweight	Cung Le	def.	Mike Altman	KO (Punch)	1	3:51
Lightweight	Gilbert Melendez	def.	Harris Sarmiento	Submission (Punches)	2	0:44
Lightweight	Nate Diaz	def.	Tony Juarez	TKO (Punches)	1	3:23
Preliminary card
Middleweight	Eugene Jackson	def.	Jorge Ortiz	Decision (Unanimous)	3	5:00
Heavyweight	Mike Kyle	vs.	Krzysztof Soszynski	Technical Draw (Thumb to Soszynski's Eye)	1	2:02
Light Heavyweight	Brian Ebersole	def.	Matt Horwich	Decision (Unanimous)	3	5:00
Heavyweight	Daniel Puder	def.	Jesse Fujarczyk	Submission (Rear-Naked Choke)	1	1:54
Middleweight	Crafton Wallace	def.	Ray Routh	KO (Knee)	2	0:35
Middleweight	Scott Graham	def.	Chris Yee	Submission (Rear-Naked Choke)	2	2:37

== See also ==
- Strikeforce
- List of Strikeforce champions
- List of Strikeforce events
- 2006 in Strikeforce
