= Savage Dog =

- Directed by: Jesse V. Johnson
- Written by: Jesse V. Johnson
- Produced by: Charles Arthur Berg; Ehud Bleiberg; Jesse V. Johnson
- Starring: Scott Adkins
- Cinematography: Maury Covington Jr. Gabriel Gely
- Edited by: Matthew Lorentz
- Music by: Sean Murray
- Distributed by: XLrator Media
- Release dates: April 28, 2017 (Germany); August 4, 2017 (United States)
- Running time: 94 minutes
- Country: United States
- Language: English

Savage Dog is a 2017 American action film written and directed by Jesse V. Johnson and starring Scott Adkins.

== Plot ==
Former IRA soldier Martin Tillman is imprisoned in a brutal Indochinese labor camp in 1959, where he's forced to participate in bare-knuckle fights for the entertainment of criminal overlords. After a rigged fight results in tragedy, Tillman seeks revenge against those who wronged him, specifically the Nazi war criminal Steiner and his henchman Rastignac.

== Cast ==
- Scott Adkins as Martin Tillman
- Marko Zaror as Jean-Pierre "The Executioner" Rastignac
- JuJu Chan as Isabelle Steiner
- Cung Le as Corporal Chef Boon
- Vladimir Kulich as Hans Steiner
- Keith David as Valentine
- Charles Fathy as Amarillo
- Matthew Marsden as MI6 Agent Harrison
- Sheena Chou as Samsip-Sam
- Luke Massy as The Champ
- Aki Aleong as Tribal Chieftain

== Reception ==
The film has a 71% rating on Rotten Tomatoes based on 14 reviews.
