= Strikeforce: Tank vs. Buentello =

Strikeforce mixed martial arts event in 2006

- The poster for Strikeforce: Tank vs. Buentello
- Promotion: Strikeforce
- Date: October 7, 2006
- Venue: Save Mart Center
- City: Fresno, California, United States
- Attendance: 4,437

Event chronology
Strikeforce: Revenge	Strikeforce: Tank vs. Buentello	Strikeforce: Triple Threat

Strikeforce: Tank vs. Buentello was a mixed martial arts event held on October 7, 2006. The event was held by Strikeforce and took place at the Save Mart Center in Fresno, California.

== Background ==
This event featured the MMA debut of future UFC Heavyweight Champion Cain Velasquez.

Wesley Correira was scheduled to fight Ruben Villareal at the event but withdrew for medical reasons and thus the bout was scrapped.

== Results ==
Main Card
Weight class				Method	Round	Time	Notes
Heavyweight	Paul Buentello	def.	David Abbott	KO (Punch)	1	0:43
Lightweight	Josh Thomson	def.	Duane Ludwig	Submission (Guillotine Choke)	2	4:36
Light Heavyweight	Trevor Prangley	def.	Anthony Ruiz	Submission (Armbar)	1	4:42
Heavyweight	Cain Velasquez	def.	Jesse Fujarczyk	TKO (Punches)	1	1:58
Preliminary card
Welterweight	Jason Von Flue	def.	Eric Wray	Submission (Arm-Triangle Choke)	2	2:22
Lightweight	Casey Olson	def.	Bobby Sanchez	Submission (Guillotine Choke)	1	1:58
Lightweight	Philip Perez	def.	Brandon Shuey	Submission (Triangle Choke)	1	1:28
Heavyweight	Mike Cook	def.	Carlton Jones	Submission (Punches)	2	2:03
Middleweight	Sam Spengler	def.	Frank Megallon	TKO (Punches)	1	2:38
Middleweight	Luke Stewart	def.	Jeremiah Metcalf	Submission (Rear-Naked Choke)	1	2:29

== See also ==
- Strikeforce
- List of Strikeforce champions
- List of Strikeforce events
- 2006 in Strikeforce
