= Duane Ludwig =

American mixed martial arts fighter

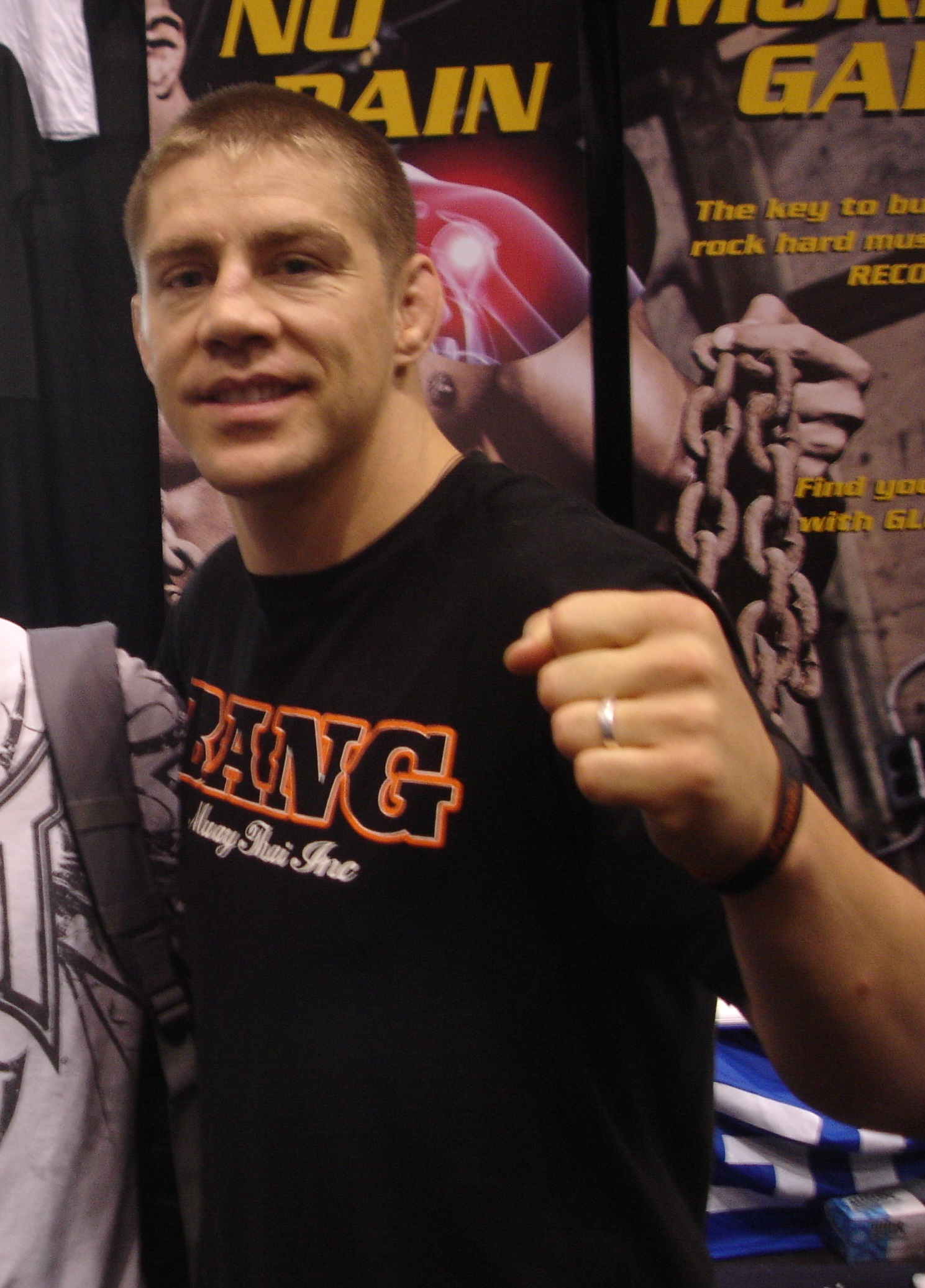
- Ludwig in 2011
- Born: Duane Paul Ludwig; August 4, 1978 (age 48); Denver, Colorado, United States
- Other names: Bang
- Height: 5 ft 10 in (1.78 m)
- Weight: 170 lb (77 kg; 12 st)
- Division: Lightweight; Welterweight
- Reach: 71 in (180 cm)
- Style: Kickboxing
- Stance: Orthodox
- Fighting out of: Denver, Colorado, United States
- Team: Ludwig Martial Arts, Grudge Training Center, Team Alpha Male
- Rank: Black Belt in Brazilian jiu-jitsu under Alberto Crane; Black belt in Bas Rutten Systems under Bas Rutten
- Years active: 2000–2012

Kickboxing record
- Total: 22
- Wins: 14
- By knockout: 5
- Losses: 7
- By knockout: 2
- Draws: 1

Mixed martial arts record
- Total: 35
- Wins: 21
- By knockout: 14
- By submission: 2
- By decision: 5
- Losses: 14
- By knockout: 7
- By submission: 6
- By decision: 1

Amateur record
- Total: 14
- Wins: 12
- By knockout: 9
- Losses: 2

Other information
- Mixed martial arts record from Sherdog
- Last updated on: November 6, 2010

Duane Paul Ludwig (born August 4, 1978) is an American mixed martial arts coach, retired professional kickboxer and mixed martial artist.

Ludwig formerly held the unofficial fastest knockout record in the UFC after his win against Jonathan Goulet (in 0:06) at UFC Fight Night 3. Ludwig was regarded as a top lightweight in the world during 2003 and 2004, for his victories over Jens Pulver at UCC 12 and Genki Sudo at UFC 42, up until a loss to B.J. Penn at K-1 MMA: Romanex. Ludwig has also received acclaim for his role in the success of Team Alpha Male operating out of Sacramento, California, which is home to numerous highly ranked mixed martial artists who have competed in organizations such as the Ultimate Fighting Championship and World Extreme Cagefighting.

== Kickboxing career ==
Duane started practicing Muay Thai when he was 15 years old. He would have a successful amateur career winning twelve of his fourteen bouts and picking up three IKF International Kickboxing Federation Muay Thai national and regional titles. He turned professional in 2000 when he defeated Terrance Jones at a Ring of Fire event, in what was a rematch from their amateur days. At the end of the year Duane won his first pro title by winning the W.K.A. US national title, which he followed with the I.M.T.C. title the next year. He had his first real challenge in 2001 when he faced world champion Alex Gong for his I.S.K.A. belt at a K-1 event in Las Vegas. The title went the distance with the young Ludwig suffering his first professional defeat. There was some controversy about the decision as some thought that despite a shaky start Ludwig had shaded it.

In 2002 Duane dropped down in weight to 70 kg to take part in a qualifying tournament for the first ever K-1 MAX world final. He won the four man tournament, defeating no. 1 ranked I.K.F. fighter Ole Laursen in the final to book his place to Tokyo. At the finals Ludwig was drawn against home favourite Masato, and despite his best efforts was unable to make the semi-finals, being outclassed by the local fighter over three rounds to lose by unanimous decision. He would get another shot at K-1 MAX glory the following year in Saitama, Japan and went one better, reaching the semi-finals where he lost to 2002 K-1 MAX champion Albert Kraus. In 2004 he won his last Muay Thai title where he finally got his hands on a world title, defeating Thai superstar Malaipet by decision after five rounds to win the I.S.K.A. world title, something Ludwig considers one of his proudest ever moments. The title fight was also notable as the belt had previously been held by Alex Gong - a rematch between him and Ludwig had been on the card since their bout in 2001 but Gong died in 2003. After this victory Duane would become increasingly involved in MMA at the expense of his Kickboxing career, although he would have a number of K-1 fights up until 2006, finishing with a 4-7-1 record with the organization.

== Mixed martial arts career ==
Ludwig was trained by Bas Rutten during his early career. Although not an official title match, Ludwig nonetheless beat Jens Pulver, who was at the time ranked as the #1 Lightweight mixed martial artist in the world by many outlets, by first round K.O.

=== UFC ===
At UFC 42, Duane Ludwig fought Genki Sudo. Sudo showed his theatrical side, walking backwards towards Ludwig and doing the robot dance before taking him down. Despite the initial domination by Sudo, Ludwig started inflicting damage while standing, avoiding a rolling kneebar and several takedown attempts. Whilst it seemed the momentum had shifted in Ludwig's favor, Sudo came back in the third round and took him down, pounding and bloodying him with punches and elbows. Whilst Ludwig was mounted, referee John McCarthy interrupted and stood the two fighters up. The "doctor's check" allowed Ludwig time to recuperate, while being administered first aid to stop the bleeding in his nose. When the doctor allowed the fight to resume they did not restart from the same previous dominant position held by Sudo. Ludwig took advantage of the indirect rest given to him and avoided the ground and dominated the standup with several hurtful shots on Sudo to win a split decision. Ludwig mocked Sudo after the final bell with a crane kick pose. This eventually led to a rule change that during a doctor's check, fighters will resume the action from the same position where it was halted.

=== Notorious fast knockout ===
At UFC Fight Night 3, Ludwig faced Jonathan Goulet. Ludwig won the fight via quick knockout, though many fans disagreed with the timekeeping of the finish, which was 11 seconds despite the referee pulling Ludwig away from Goulet at around the 6 second mark. Following multiple online campaigns to overturn the timekeeping error, on Christmas Eve 2011, UFC President Dana White informed Ludwig that he was being given the official fastest knockout time. Two days later, Keith Kizer and the Nevada State Athletic Commission denied that Ludwig would be given the record, with Kizer stating: "There's no legal avenue to overturn it" before going on to say "I timed it myself with a stopwatch. It was eight seconds. Officially, it's got to stay at 11 seconds, but unofficially, it could be at eight." Two days later, Dana White, along with his production crew posted a video to YouTube showing the times of UFC fights that hold the "Fastest Knockout" tag. Ludwig's knockout was timed at 6.06 seconds, compared to Chan Sung Jung's knockout at 6.26 seconds and Todd Duffee's knockout at 7.56 seconds.

In 2019, Jorge Masvidal beat Ludwig's time with a knockout in five seconds.

=== Return To UFC ===
On December 17, it was announced that Ludwig was set to return to the UFC at UFC 108, facing Jim Miller, replacing an injured Sean Sherk. He lost to Miller via armbar in the first round.

Ludwig was scheduled to face Spencer Fisher on March 21, 2010, at UFC LIVE: Vera vs. Jones, but Fisher was forced off the card with an injury. Ludwig instead faced UFC newcomer Darren Elkins. Ludwig lost via TKO after he suffered a serious ankle injury during the first round.

Ludwig moved up to the Welterweight Division to face Nick Osipczak on November 13, 2010, at UFC 122. The fight was supposed to be on the preliminary part of the event, but a last minute illness to main card fighter Alessio Sakara moved the bout to the main card. Ludwig scored with strikes, including multiple grazing headkicks in the first round until Osipczak landed a combination, buckling the veteran. The round ended with Osipczak landing ground and pound from the top, bloodying Ludwig. The second round was pretty even with mixed striking exchanges and takedown attempts. The third round saw Ludwig land a big left early on and basically stalk Osipczak the rest of the round, scoring but failing to finish as Osipczak was seemingly out on his feet, walking away from exchanges and covering up. The bout was Ludwig's first since an eight-month recovery from a severe leg injury. Ludwig won by split decision.

Ludwig was expected to face Amir Sadollah on March 26, 2011, at UFC Fight Night 24, but was unable to fight due to a sternum injury. James Wilks took his place in the match instead.

Ludwig vs. Sadollah eventually took place on August 14, 2011, at UFC on Versus 5. Ludwig won the fight via unanimous decision (29-28, 29–28, 29–28). Ludwig outstruck and rocked Sadollah in both the first and second rounds while also showing greatly improved takedown defense throughout the fight.

Ludwig next faced Josh Neer on January 20, 2012, at UFC on FX: Guillard vs. Miller. Despite hurting Neer on several occasions via punches, Ludwig lost the fight via technical submission in the first round.

Ludwig fought Dan Hardy on May 26, 2012, at UFC 146. Ludwig suffered a knockout loss to Hardy when he was hit by a flush left hook and followed up elbows.

Ludwig faced Che Mills on September 29, 2012, at UFC on Fuel TV 5. The bout was stopped after Ludwig was unable to continue after tearing a knee ligament while attempting to defend a takedown in the opening round.

After his loss to Mills, Ludwig retired from MMA competition.

From December 2012 to May 2014, Ludwig was the head coach at Team Alpha Male. Ludwig left Team Alpha Male after UFC 173 to focus on growing his own gym, BANG Muay Thai.

== Personal life ==
Ludwig and his wife Jessica have three children; one daughter Jade, a son named Duane Jr., on November 10, 2010, and a son named Carter Bas Ludwig born in 2013. Before becoming a professional fighter, Ludwig used to work as an electrician.

Before his move to Colorado, Ludwig previously served as the camp's head coach, where his impact was believed to have had the "missing link" in elevating the team as one of the gold standards for training camps in the world. Ludwig has been voted the Coach of the Year in 2013 and 2014. Ludwig was considered the key element in helping Team Alpha Male win Gym of the Year in 2013 by the World MMA Awards.

BANG Muay Thai Martial Arts System

Ludwig created BANG Muay Thai system (or BMT) which is a Muay Thai system. The philosophy draws upon experience from Ludwig's career and coaches such as Bas Rutten and Trevor Wittman. The system is a striking style which includes Muay Thai, Dutch kickboxing, American boxing and traditional martial arts. Approximately 40 schools teach BMT.

In October 2010, Ludwig opened his own Mixed Martial Arts Academy known as "Ludwig Martial Arts" where he trains fighters such as former UFC Bantamweight Champion TJ Dillashaw and perennial UFC Flyweight contender Joseph Benavidez as well as several others.

== Championships and accomplishments ==
=== Mixed martial arts ===
- Ultimate Fighting Championship
  - UFC.com Awards
    - 2006: Ranked #8 Knockout of the Year vs. Jonathan Goulet
- TKO Major League MMA
  - 2003 U.C.C. World Lightweight Champion
- Extreme Shoot Fighting
  - 2000 Extreme Shoot Fighting Lightweight Champion
- Sherdog Awards
  - Fighter of the Year Honorable Mention (2003)
  - Fight of the Year Honorable Mention (2003) vs. Genki Sudo at UFC 42
- World MMA Awards
  - The "Shawn Tompkins" Coach of the Year Award (2013)
  - The "Shawn Tompkins" Coach of the Year Award (2014)
  - Gym of the Year (2013)
- Yahoo! Sports
  - Trainer of the Year (2013)

=== Kickboxing ===
- K-1
  - K-1 2002 World MAX USA Champion -70 kg
- International Sport Karate Association
  - I.S.K.A. 2004 Muay Thai Light Middleweight World Champion -72.5 kg
- World Kickboxing Association
  - W.K.A. 2000 Muay Thai Super Middleweight USA title -76 kg
- International Kickboxing Federation
  - IKF 1999 Muay Thai Light Middleweight U.S. Amateur Tournament Champion -72.5 kg
  - IKF 1999 Muay Thai Super Middleweight U.S. Amateur Champion -78 kg
  - IKF 1999 Regional Middleweight Muay Thai Champion
  - IKF 1999 Fighter of the Year
- International Muay Thai Council
  - I.M.T.C. 2001 Muay Thai Super Middleweight North American Champion -76 kg

== Mixed martial arts record ==
Professional record breakdown
35 matches	21 wins	14 losses
By knockout	14	7
By submission	2	6
By decision	5	1

Res.	Record	Opponent	Method	Event	Date	Round	Time	Location	Notes
Loss	21–14	Che Mills	TKO (knee injury)	UFC on Fuel TV: Struve vs. Miocic	September 29, 2012	1	2:28	Nottingham, England	
Loss	21–13	Dan Hardy	KO (punch and elbows)	UFC 146	May 26, 2012	1	3:51	Las Vegas, Nevada, United States	
Loss	21–12	Josh Neer	Technical Submission (guillotine choke)	UFC on FX: Guillard vs. Miller	January 20, 2012	1	3:04	Nashville, Tennessee, United States	
Win	21–11	Amir Sadollah	Decision (unanimous)	UFC Live: Hardy vs. Lytle	August 14, 2011	3	5:00	Milwaukee, Wisconsin, United States	
Win	20–11	Nick Osipczak	Decision (split)	UFC 122	November 13, 2010	3	5:00	Oberhausen, Germany	Return to Welterweight.
Loss	19–11	Darren Elkins	TKO (ankle injury)	UFC Live: Vera vs. Jones	March 21, 2010	1	0:44	Broomfield, Colorado, United States	
Loss	19–10	Jim Miller	Submission (armbar)	UFC 108	January 2, 2010	1	2:31	Las Vegas, Nevada, United States	
Win	19–9	Ryan Roberts	TKO (submission to punches)	ROF 36: Demolition	December 4, 2009	1	2:05	Denver, Colorado, United States	
Loss	18–9	Lyle Beerbohm	Submission (bulldog choke)	Strikeforce Challengers: Villasenor vs. Cyborg	June 19, 2009	1	4:27	Kent, Washington, United States	
Win	18–8	Yves Edwards	Decision (unanimous)	Strikeforce: Destruction	November 21, 2008	3	5:00	San Jose, California, United States	160 lb. Catchweight
Win	17–8	Sammy Morgan	TKO (punches)	Strikeforce: Payback	October 3, 2008	1	2:01	Broomfield, Colorado, United States	
Loss	16–8	Takanori Gomi	TKO (doctor stoppage)	World Victory Road Presents: Sengoku First Battle	March 5, 2008	1	2:28	Tokyo, Japan	
Win	16–7	Mario Stapel	KO (punch)	ROF 30: Domination	September 15, 2007	1	1:50	Broomfield, Colorado, United States	
Loss	15–7	Paul Daley	TKO (punches)	Strikeforce: Shamrock vs. Baroni	June 22, 2007	2	0:42	San Jose, California, United States	Welterweight bout.
Win	15–6	Shinya Kumazawa	Technical Submission (arm-triangle choke)	ROF 28: Evolution	February 16, 2007	2	4:32	Broomfield, Colorado, United States	
Win	14–6	Tony Fryklund	TKO (knees)	Strikeforce: Triple Threat	December 8, 2006	2	3:37	San Jose, California, United States	Welterweight bout.
Loss	13–6	Josh Thomson	Submission (guillotine choke)	Strikeforce: Tank vs. Buentello	October 7, 2006	2	4:36	Fresno, California, United States	
Loss	13–5	Tyson Griffin	TKO (punches)	Strikeforce: Revenge	June 9, 2006	1	3:57	San Jose, California, United States	
Win	13–4	Jason Palacios	Submission (armbar)	International Freestyle Fighting 1	May 6, 2006	1	4:56	Fort Worth, Texas, United States	
Win	12–4	Toshikatsu Harada	KO (punches)	ROF 21: Full Blast	February 11, 2006	1	1:44	Castle Rock, Colorado, United States	Return to Lightweight.
Win	11–4	Jonathan Goulet	KO (punch)	UFC Fight Night 3	January 16, 2006	1	0:11	Las Vegas, Nevada, United States	
Loss	10–4	Sammy Morgan	KO (punches)	Ring of Fire 16	April 9, 2005	1	0:52	Denver, Colorado, United States	
Loss	10–3	B.J. Penn	Submission (arm-triangle choke)	K-1 MMA: Romanex	May 22, 2004	1	1:45	Saitama, Saitama, Japan	Welterweight debut.
Win	10–2	Genki Sudo	Decision (split)	UFC 42	April 25, 2003	3	5:00	Miami, Florida, United States	
Win	9–2	Jens Pulver	KO (punch)	UCC 12: Adrenaline	January 25, 2003	1	1:03	Montreal, Quebec, Canada	Won the UCC Lightweight Championship.
Win	8–2	Thomas Denny	TKO (submission to knees)	Shogun 1	December 15, 2001	1	4:18	Honolulu, Hawaii, United States	
Win	7–2	Ressen Messer	TKO (punches)	GC 5: Rumble in the Rockies	August 19, 2001	N/A	N/A	Denver, Colorado, United States	
Win	6–2	Charles Bennett	TKO (exhaustion)	KOTC 10: Critical Mass	August 4, 2001	2	2:38	San Jacinto, California, United States	
Win	5–2	Cesar Moreno	KO (punches)	GC 4: Collision at Colusa	June 17, 2001	1	3:58	Colusa, California, United States	
Loss	4–2	Eric Payne	Submission (rear-naked choke)	ROF 2: Trial By Fire	February 10, 2001	1	0:35	Denver, Colorado, United States	For ROF Lightweight Championship.
Loss	4–1	Kelly Dullanty	Decision (unanimous)	KOTC 6: Road Warriors	November 29, 2000	3	5:00	Mount Pleasant, Michigan, United States	
Win	4–0	Shad Smith	TKO (corner stoppage)	KOTC 4: Gladiators	June 24, 2000	1	3:08	San Jacinto, California, United States	
Win	3–0	Jason Maxwell	Decision (unanimous)	KOTC 3: Knockout Nightmare	April 15, 2000	2	5:00	San Jacinto, California, United States	
Win	2–0	Earl Littlepage	TKO (submission to punches)	Aspen Slammer	February 25, 2000	N/A	N/A	Aspen, Colorado, United States	
Win	1–0	David Ibarra	KO (head kick)	KOTC 2: Desert Storm	February 5, 2000	1	4:15	San Jacinto, California, United States	

== Professional kickboxing record ==
Professional Kickboxing Record
14 Wins (5 (T)KO's), 7 Losses, 1 Draw
Date	Result	Opponent	Event	Location	Method	Round	Time
2006-08-12	Draw	(United States) Fernando Calleros	K-1 World GP 2006 Las Vegas II	Las Vegas, Nevada, USA	Decision Draw	3	3:00
2005-08-13	Loss	(France) Remy Bonnel	K-1 World GP 2005 Las Vegas II	Las Vegas, Nevada, USA	Decision (Unanimous)	3	3:00
2005-07-20	Loss	(Netherlands) Ramon Dekkers	K-1 World MAX 2005 Final, Super Fight	Yokohama, Japan	Decision (Unanimous)	3	3:00
2004-11-06	Loss	(Thailand) Fuji Chalmsak	Titans 1st	Kitakyushu, Japan	KO	3	1:15
2004-10-13	Win	(Netherlands) William Diender	K-1 World MAX 2004 Champions' Challenge	Tokyo, Japan	Ext.R Decision (Unanimous)	4	3:00
2004-07-07	Win	(Turkey) Serkan Yilmaz	K-1 World MAX 2004 Final, Reserve Fight	Tokyo, Japan	Decision (Unanimous)	3	3:00
2004-04-07	Loss	(Australia) John Wayne Parr	K-1 World MAX 2004 Open	Tokyo, Japan	Decision (Unanimous)	3	3:00
Fails to qualify for K-1 World MAX 2004 Final although he will be invited to take part in a reserve fight.
2004-01-10	Win	(Thailand) Malaipet Sitprapom	Ring of Fire 11: Bring it On, Douglas County Event Center	Castle Rock, CO	Decision (Unanimous)	5	3:00
Wins vacant I.S.K.A. Muay Thai Light Middleweight world title -72.5 kg.
2003-11-18	Win	(Japan) Toshio Matsumoto	K-1 World MAX 2003 Champions' Challenge	Tokyo, Japan	TKO (Corner Stoppage)	2	2:12
2003-07-05	Loss	(Netherlands) Albert Kraus	K-1 World MAX 2003 Final, Semi-finals	Saitama, Japan	KO (Left Hook)	3	1:33
2003-07-05	Win	(Japan) Kozo Takeda	K-1 World MAX 2003 Final, Quarter-finals	Saitama, Japan	KO (Left Hook)	2	0:46
2002-12-28	Win	(United States) Jeremy Harminson	Ring of Fire 6	Denver, Colorado, USA	TKO (Ref Stop/Punches)	4	
2002-05-11	Loss	(Japan) Masato	K-1 World MAX 2002, Quarter-finals	Tokyo, Japan	Decision (Unanimous)	3	3:00
2002-03-15	Win	(Denmark) Ole Laursen	K-1 World MAX 2002 USA, Final	Denver, Colorado, USA	Ext.R Decision (Unanimous)	4	3:00
Wins K-1 World MAX 2002 USA tournament -70 kg and qualifies for K-1 World MAX 2002 Final.
2002-03-15	Win	(Canada) Melvin Murray	K-1 World MAX 2002 USA, Semi-finals	Denver, Colorado, USA	KO (Knee Strikes)	2	1:03
2001-10-12	Win	(France) George Humbert	Warriors Cup 4	Culver City, California, USA	Decision (Unanimous)	5	3:00
2001-05-05	Loss	(United States) Alex Gong	K-1 World GP 2001 Preliminary USA	Las Vegas, Nevada, USA	Decision (Split)	5	3:00
Fight was for Gong's I.S.K.A. Muay Thai Light Middleweight world title -72.5 kg.
2001-03-17	Win	(United States) Pedro Villalobos	Marconi Show	Tustin, California, USA	Decision (Unanimous)	5	3:00
2001-02-25	Win	(United States) Brian Popejoy	Warriors Cup 2	Burbank, California, USA	Decision (Unanimous)	5	3:00
Wins I.M.T.C. Muay Thai Super Middleweight North American title -76 kg.
2000-09-09	Win	(United States) Doug Evans	Warriors Cup	Irvine, California, USA			
Wins W.K.A. Muay Thai Super Middleweight USA title -76 kg.
2000-05-13	Win	(United States) Steven Berkolyko	Mohegan Sun Casino	Uncasville, Connecticut, USA	TKO (Corner Stoppage)	3	3:00
2000-03-18	Win	(United States) Terrace James	Ring of Fire	Council Bluffs, Iowa, USA	Decision (Unanimous)	5	3:00
Legend: Win Loss Draw/No contest Notes

== Amateur kickboxing record ==
Amateur Kickboxing Record
12 Wins (9 (T)KO's), 2 Losses
Date	Result	Opponent	Event	Location	Method	Round	Time
1999-10-16	Win	(United States) Shale Lapage	IKF Iowa	Council Bluffs, Iowa, USA	TKO (Referee Stoppage)	3	1:41
1999-09-05	Win	(United States) Rob Wiley	IKF USA National Amateur Championships, Final	Council Bluffs, Iowa, USA	Decision (Unanimous)	3	3:00
Wins IKF Muay Thai Light Middleweight U.S Amateur Tournament -72.5 kg. Ludwig only had one match as he had a walkthrough to the final.
1999-08-21	Win	(United States) Terrace James	IKF "The Brawl in Bloomfield"	Bloomfield, Connecticut, USA	Decision (Unanimous)	5	3:00
Wins vacant IKF Muay Thai Super Middleweight U.S Amateur Title -78 kg.
1999-06-05	Loss	(United States) Tony Haddock	IKF Orlando "Rocks the House!!!"	Orlando, Florida, USA	TKO (Referee Stoppage)	2	0:51
Fight was for vacant IKF International Rules Light Middleweight U.S Amateur Title -72.5 kg.
1998-11-07	Win	(United States) Grigoriy Flitsanov	IKF Iowa	Council Bluffs, Iowa, USA	Decision (Split)	3	3:00
1999-06-26	Win	(United States) Neal Waka	Bas Rutten Invitational III	Denver, USA	TKO(strikes)		
1998-08-23	Loss	(Canada) Trevor Desjarlais	IKF Canada	Calgary, Canada	Decision	3	3:00
Legend: Win Loss Draw/No contest Notes

Preceded by Alex Gong	ISKA World Muay Thai Light Middleweight Champion; January 10, 2004	Vacant
