= Josh Thomson =

American mixed martial artist (born 1978)

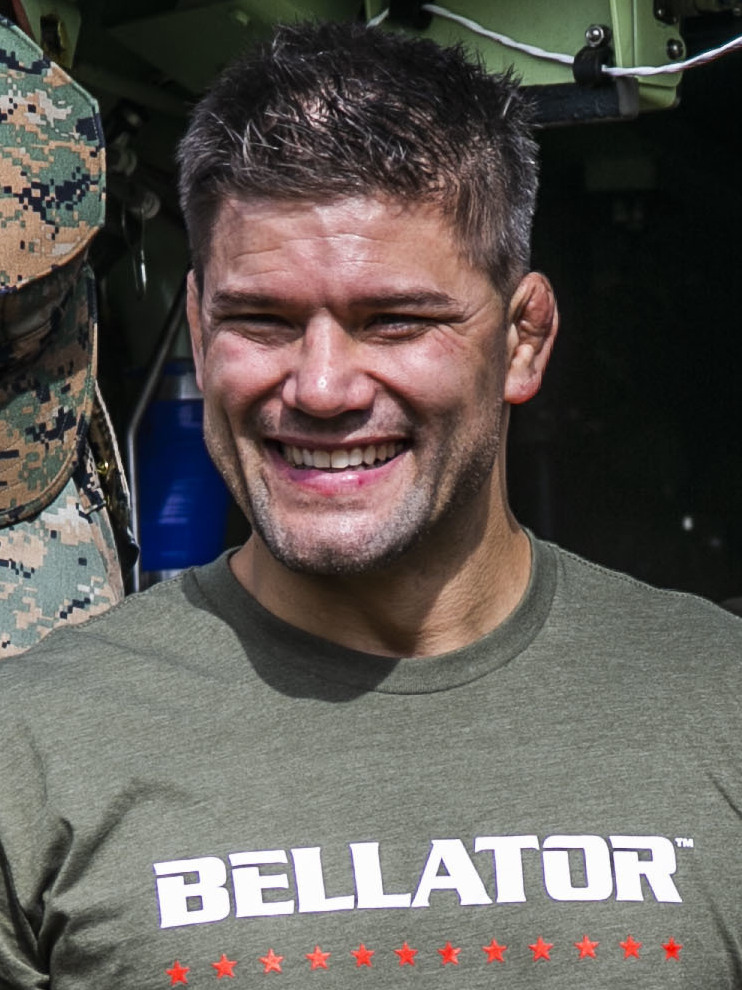
- Thomson in 2019
- Born: September 21, 1978 (age 48); San Jose, California, US
- Other names: The Punk
- Height: 5 ft 10 in (1.78 m)
- Weight: 155 lb (70 kg; 11.1 st)
- Division: Lightweight
- Reach: 71 in (180 cm)
- Fighting out of: San Jose, California, US
- Team: American Kickboxing Academy
- Rank: Black belt in Brazilian jiu-jitsu under Dave Camarillo
- Wrestling: NJCAA Wrestling
- Years active: 2001–2017

Kickboxing record
- Total: 3
- Wins: 3

Mixed martial arts record
- Total: 32
- Wins: 22
- By knockout: 7
- By submission: 9
- By decision: 6
- Losses: 9
- By knockout: 2
- By decision: 7
- No contests: 1

Other information
- Mixed martial arts record from Sherdog

Joshua Joseph Thomson (born September 21, 1978) is an American mixed martial arts podcaster, commentator, analyst and former mixed martial artist. A professional competitor since 2001, Thomson has competed in Bellator MMA, PRIDE, Strikeforce, UFC, the World Fighting Alliance, and appeared at Dynamite!! 2010. Thomson is a former Strikeforce World Lightweight Champion and former Strikeforce U.S. Lightweight Champion.

== Background ==
Thomson was born and raised in San Jose, California, growing up in the east side of the city. Being half-European-American and half-Mexican, Thomson faced discrimination and got into fights often. In middle school, he was involved in a brawl in which the principal was punched while trying to break up the incident, resulting in Thomson being placed in a juvenile hall. Afterwards, Thomson went to live with his father in Idaho where he went to high school and competed in wrestling. Thomson continued wrestling at junior college powerhouse, North Idaho Community College, and also trained with the wrestling team at Stanford University before deciding school was not for him. His college wrestling record was 40–3. In 2000, Thomson was involved in an alcohol-fueled brawl while on a lake cruise in Idaho. In the melee Thomson choked one man so badly that he required CPR and as a result, Thomson was charged with felony aggravated assault, serving six months of a three-year sentence before being released for good behavior.

== Mixed martial arts career ==
Thomson's professional MMA career began with two wins by knockout and submission, respectively. His third fight ended in a no contest against Norifumi Yamamoto. Thomson went on to win his next three fights, including a win over former WEC Lightweight Champion Rob McCullough before debuting in the UFC.

=== Ultimate Fighting Championship ===
Thomson made his debut in the UFC at UFC 44 defeating Gerald Strebendt by knockout in the first round. He would then pick up a decision victory over Hermes Franca in an incredible fight at UFC 46, before falling victim in his next fight to a highlight reel knockout finish at the hands of Yves Edwards.

=== Strikeforce ===
Thomson went 2-1 in the UFC before leaving and opting instead to go overseas to Japan and fight for PRIDE FC. He won his sole fight in PRIDE by submission in the first round. Thomson then signed with Strikeforce and made his debut against Clay Guida in a title fight for the vacant Strikeforce Lightweight Championship losing by unanimous decision. Thomson would go on to win his next six fights, including victories over Duane Ludwig and Nam Phan earning him another shot at the Strikeforce Lightweight Championship.

On June 27, 2008, he defeated Gilbert Melendez by unanimous decision at Strikeforce: Melendez vs. Thomson to become the new Strikeforce Lightweight Champion.

On November 21, 2008, Thomson was scheduled to make his first title defense in a rematch against Yves Edwards at Strikeforce: Destruction but had to pull out after tearing ligaments in his toe. Duane Ludwig was selected to take Thomson's place on the card. On April 11, 2009, Thomson was scheduled to make his first title defense in a rematch against Gilbert Melendez at Strikeforce's debut on the Showtime Network, but had to pull out after breaking his ankle while training on April 1, 2009. Rodrigo Damm was selected to take Thomson's place on the card.

On August 15, 2009, Thomson was scheduled to unify his title with the newly crowned Strikeforce Interim Lightweight Champion Gilbert Melendez at Strikeforce: Carano vs. Cyborg, but suffered a broken leg in training. Mitsuhiro Ishida was selected to take Thomson's place against Melendez.

On December 19, 2009, at Strikeforce: Evolution, Thomson fought Gilbert Melendez for the Lightweight Championship. Thomson would lose the fight by unanimous decision, but the fight would see both fighters put it all on the line in what would prove to be a very fast-paced fight.

Thomson fought Pat Healy at Strikeforce: Fedor vs. Werdum and won by rear naked choke late in the 3rd round. After this win, Dave Camarillo granted him his black belt in Guerrilla jiu-jitsu. Thomson broke two ribs during the fight on Healy's very first takedown and fought the rest of the fight very defensively.

Thomson fought Gesias Cavalcante on October 9, 2010, at Strikeforce: San Jose where he won a controversial unanimous decision (29–28, 29–28, and 30–27).

Thomson's next fight was against Tatsuya Kawajiri under the co-promoted DREAM, K-1 end of year event Dynamite!! 2010. He lost the fight via unanimous decision.

Thomson was expected to face promotional newcomer Maximo Blanco at Strikeforce World Grand Prix: Barnett vs. Kharitonov but yet another foot injury forced him out of the bout.

Thomson returned in March 2012 to face K. J. Noons at Strikeforce: Tate vs. Rousey. He won the fight via unanimous decision.

The trilogy rematch between Thomson and Gilbert Melendez for the Strikeforce Lightweight Championship took place at Strikeforce: Barnett vs. Cormier on May 19, 2012, with Thomson losing the fight via split decision.

=== Return to the UFC ===
Following the dissolution of Strikeforce in January 2013, Thomson returned to the UFC and faced Nate Diaz on April 20, 2013, at UFC on Fox 7. He won the fight via TKO (head kick and punches), becoming the first of only three fighters (Hermes Franca & Jorge Masvidal) to finish Diaz. The win also earned him his first Knockout of the Night bonus award.

Thomson was expected to face current UFC Lightweight Champion Anthony Pettis on December 14, 2013, at UFC on Fox 9, replacing an injured T. J. Grant, However, the bout was cancelled after Pettis pulled out of the bout citing a knee injury.

Thomson faced Benson Henderson on January 25, 2014, in the main event at UFC on Fox 10. Henderson defeated Thomson via split decision. Many media outlets and observers were split on who they thought should have been declared the winner. Thomson had one more takedown (5 to 4) and was able to secure Henderson's back on multiple occasions, while Henderson was able to significantly outstrike Thomson (114 to 33) over the duration of the bout and was credited with the bout's only submission attempt. During the first round Thomson broke the thumb on his right hand, contributing to his inability to punch with much effectiveness. Disappointed in the result of the Henderson bout, Thomson indicated in the post-fight press conference, that he may be "done" with the UFC or fighting.

Thomson was expected to face Michael Johnson on July 26, 2014, at UFC on Fox 12. However, on July 11, Johnson pulled out of the bout due to injury and was replaced by Bobby Green. Thomson lost the bout via split decision.

Thomson was expected to face Gilbert Burns on March 21, 2015, at UFC Fight Night 62. However, on February 26, Thomson pulled out of the fight with an undisclosed injury, while Burns remained on the card against a replacement.

Thomson faced Tony Ferguson at UFC Fight Night: Mir vs. Duffee on July 15, 2015. He lost the fight via unanimous decision. Thomson's contract ended after his bout with Ferguson and he opted not to re-sign with the UFC.

=== Bellator MMA ===
On August 11, 2015, Thomson signed a multi-fight contract with Bellator MMA. He made his debut on September 19, 2015, at Bellator MMA & Glory: Dynamite 1 against Mike Bronzoulis, winning via submission in the third round.

In his second fight for the promotion, Thomson faced Pablo Villaseca on December 4, 2015, at Bellator 147. He won the fight via TKO in the second round.

In his third fight for Bellator MMA Thomson faced Patricky Pitbull in the main event at Bellator 172. He lost the fight via knockout in the second round.

On January 28, 2020, Thomson announced his retirement from mixed martial arts.

== Personal life ==
Before becoming a full-time professional fighter, Thomson worked in construction.

Thomson co-hosts the podcast "Weighing In" with former MMA referee "Big" John McCarthy about MMA and combat sports.

Thomson made his acting debut in Fist of the Dragon (2014).

== Championships and accomplishments ==
- Strikeforce
  - Strikeforce Lightweight Championship (One time)
  - Strikeforce U.S. Lightweight Championship (One time)
    - One successful title defense
  - Most bouts in Strikeforce history (13)
- Ultimate Fighting Championship
  - Knockout of the Night (One time) vs. Nate Diaz
- Sports Illustrated
  - 2009 Round of the Year vs. Gilbert Melendez on December 19; round 5

== Mixed martial arts record ==
Professional record breakdown
32 matches	22 wins	9 losses
By knockout	7	2
By submission	9	0
By decision	6	7
No contests	1	

Res.	Record	Opponent	Method	Event	Date	Round	Time	Location	Notes
Loss	22–9 (1)	Patricky Pitbull	KO (punch)	Bellator 172	February 18, 2017	2	0:40	San Jose, California, United States	
Win	22–8 (1)	Pablo Villaseca	TKO (punches)	Bellator 147	December 4, 2015	2	3:59	San Jose, California, United States	
Win	21–8 (1)	Mike Bronzoulis	Submission (arm-triangle choke)	Bellator 142: Dynamite 1	September 19, 2015	3	0:39	San Jose, California, United States	
Loss	20–8 (1)	Tony Ferguson	Decision (unanimous)	UFC Fight Night: Mir vs. Duffee	July 15, 2015	3	5:00	San Diego, California, United States	
Loss	20–7 (1)	Bobby Green	Decision (split)	UFC on Fox: Lawler vs. Brown	July 26, 2014	3	5:00	San Jose, California, United States	
Loss	20–6 (1)	Benson Henderson	Decision (split)	UFC on Fox: Henderson vs. Thomson	January 25, 2014	5	5:00	Chicago, Illinois, United States	
Win	20–5 (1)	Nate Diaz	TKO (head kick and punches)	UFC on Fox: Henderson vs. Melendez	April 20, 2013	2	3:44	San Jose, California, United States	Knockout of the Night.
Loss	19–5 (1)	Gilbert Melendez	Decision (split)	Strikeforce: Barnett vs. Cormier	May 19, 2012	5	5:00	San Jose, California, United States	For the Strikeforce Lightweight Championship.
Win	19–4 (1)	K. J. Noons	Decision (unanimous)	Strikeforce: Tate vs. Rousey	March 3, 2012	3	5:00	Columbus, Ohio, United States	Strikeforce Lightweight title eliminator.
Loss	18–4 (1)	Tatsuya Kawajiri	Decision (unanimous)	Dynamite!! 2010	December 31, 2010	3	5:00	Saitama, Japan	
Win	18–3 (1)	Gesias Cavalcante	Decision (unanimous)	Strikeforce: Diaz vs. Noons II	October 9, 2010	3	5:00	San Jose, California, United States	
Win	17–3 (1)	Pat Healy	Submission (rear-naked choke)	Strikeforce: Fedor vs. Werdum	June 26, 2010	3	4:27	San Jose, California, United States	
Loss	16–3 (1)	Gilbert Melendez	Decision (unanimous)	Strikeforce: Evolution	December 19, 2009	5	5:00	San Jose, California, United States	Lost the Strikeforce Lightweight Championship.
Win	16–2 (1)	Ashe Bowman	TKO (punches)	Strikeforce: At The Mansion II	September 20, 2008	1	1:14	Beverly Hills, California, United States	
Win	15–2 (1)	Gilbert Melendez	Decision (unanimous)	Strikeforce: Melendez vs. Thomson	June 27, 2008	5	5:00	San Jose, California, United States	Won the Strikeforce Lightweight Championship.
Win	14–2 (1)	Adam Lynn	KO (punches)	Strikeforce: Playboy Mansion	September 29, 2007	1	4:45	Beverly Hills, California, United States	
Win	13–2 (1)	Nick Gonzalez	Submission (rear-naked choke)	Strikeforce: Shamrock vs. Baroni	June 22, 2007	1	1:42	San Jose, California, United States	Defended the Strikeforce U.S. Lightweight Championship.
Win	12–2 (1)	Nam Phan	Decision (unanimous)	Strikeforce: Triple Threat	December 8, 2006	3	5:00	San Jose, California, United States	Won the Strikeforce U.S. Lightweight Championship.
Win	11–2 (1)	Duane Ludwig	Submission (guillotine choke)	Strikeforce: Tank vs. Buentello	October 7, 2006	2	4:36	Fresno, California, United States	
Win	10–2 (1)	Rocky Johnson	Submission (armbar)	Pride and Fury 5	July 6, 2006	1	1:55	Worley, Idaho, United States	
Win	9–2 (1)	Harris Sarmiento	Submission (arm-triangle choke)	Strikeforce: Revenge	June 9, 2006	3	3:19	San Jose, California, United States	
Loss	8–2 (1)	Clay Guida	Decision (unanimous)	Strikeforce: Shamrock vs. Gracie	March 10, 2006	5	5:00	San Jose, California, United States	For the inaugural Strikeforce Lightweight Championship. Guida was deducted one point for eye gouging.
Win	8–1 (1)	Daisuke Sugie	Submission (kneebar)	PRIDE Bushido 8	July 17, 2005	1	2:35	Nagoya, Japan	
Loss	7–1 (1)	Yves Edwards	KO (flying head kick and punches)	UFC 49	August 21, 2004	1	4:32	Las Vegas, Nevada, United States	
Win	7–0 (1)	Hermes França	Decision (unanimous)	UFC 46	January 31, 2004	3	5:00	Las Vegas, Nevada, United States	
Win	6–0 (1)	Gerald Strebendt	KO (punches)	UFC 44	September 26, 2003	1	2:45	Las Vegas, Nevada, United States	
Win	5–0 (1)	Rob McCullough	Decision (unanimous)	WFA 3: Level 3	November 23, 2002	3	5:00	Las Vegas, Nevada, United States	
Win	4–0 (1)	Kajan Johnson	TKO (submission to elbows)	SE: North American Sport Fighting Invitational	September 7, 2002	2	4:56	Boise, Idaho, United States	
Win	3–0 (1)	Doug Evans	Submission (triangle choke)	NW Submission Fighting 1	May 4, 2002	1	1:29	Boise, Idaho, United States	
NC	2–0 (1)	Norifumi Yamamoto	NC (groin kick)	Shogun 1	December 15, 2001	2	2:00	Honolulu, Hawaii, United States	Accidental groin kick rendered Yamamoto unable to continue.
Win	2–0	Víctor Estrada	Submission (triangle choke)	Gladiators Vale Tudo	March 10, 2001	2	N/A	Worley, Idaho, United States	
Win	1–0	Jason Abajian	KO (punches)	Bushido 1	January 18, 2001	1	N/A	Tempe, Arizona, United States	

== Filmography ==
Year	Title	Alternative title	Role	Notes
2013	Fist of the Dragon	《龍拳》	Damon (lead actor)	Produced by Roger Corman, Directed by Antony Szeto, Lead actors: Josh Thomson, JuJu Chan, Ellary Porterfield, Maria Tran
2013	Fight Life		Himself	MMA Documentary

== See also ==
- List of male mixed martial artists

Preceded by Gilbert Melendez	3rd Strikeforce Lightweight Champion; June 27, 2008 - December 19, 2009	Succeeded by Gilbert Melendez
