= Mike Seal (fighter) =

Mixed martial arts fighter

- Born: July 30, 1977 (age 49) unknown
- Other names: El Verdugo
- Nationality: Mexican
- Height: 6 ft 3 in (1.91 m)
- Weight: 184.7 lb (83.8 kg; 13.19 st)
- Division: Middleweight
- Fighting out of: Tijuana
- Team: Lorenzo's Vale Tudo
- Years active: 2002–2007, 2010–2012

Mixed martial arts record
- Total: 30
- Wins: 13
- By knockout: 11
- By submission: 2
- Losses: 15
- By knockout: 3
- By submission: 10
- By decision: 2
- Unknown: 0
- Draws: 1
- No contests: 1

Other information
- Mixed martial arts record from Sherdog
- retired in 2012

Mike Seal (born July 30, 1977) is a professional mixed martial artist, actor, and stuntman competing in the Middleweight division. A professional competitor since 2000, he has fought for Strikeforce, Bellator MMA, Sengoku Raiden Championship and King of the Cage.

== Mixed martial arts career ==
=== Early career ===
Seal started his career in 2002. In his first four years, he fought mainly for Mexican and American southwestern promotions, such as King of the Cage, Gladiator Challenge and MMA Mexico.

In 2006, Seal signed with Strikeforce.

=== Strikeforce ===
Seal faced UFC veteran Eugene Jackson on June 9, 2006 at Strikeforce: Revenge. He lost via TKO in the second round.

=== World Victory Road ===
Seal faced 2006 Pride FC welterweight grand prix winner Kazuo Misaki on December 30, 2010 at Sengoku: Soul of Fight. He lost via TKO early in the first round.

In 2012, Seal signed with Bellator.

=== Bellator Fighting Championships ===
Seal faced Jonas Billstein on May 25, 2012 at Bellator 70. He lost via technical submission in the first round.

== Mixed martial arts record ==
Professional record breakdown
31 matches	13 wins	16 losses
By knockout	9	3
By submission	4	10
By decision	0	2
Unknown	0	1
Draws	1	
No contests	1	

Res.	Record	Opponent	Method	Event	Date	Round	Time	Location	Notes
Loss	13–16–1 (1)	Cedric Marks	Decision (unanimous)	Moore EFC 1	September 1, 2018	3	5:00	Payson, Arizona, United States	
Loss	13–15–1 (1)	Jonas Billstein	Technical submission (rear-naked choke)	Bellator 70	May 25, 2012	1	2:55	New Orleans, Louisiana, United States	
Loss	13–14–1 (1)	Kazuo Misaki	TKO (punches)	World Victory Road Presents: Soul of Fight	December 30, 2010	1	1:15	Tokyo, Japan	
Loss	13–13–1 (1)	Timothy Woods	Technical submission (rear-naked choke)	UWC 8: Judgment Day	May 22, 2010	2	3:35	Fairfax, Virginia, United States	
Win	13–12–1 (1)	Marcos Rodriguez	TKO (injury)	COF 7: Face Off	June 23, 2007	1	N/A	Tijuana, Baja California, Mexico	
Win	12–12–1 (1)	John Cronk	TKO (submission to punches)	Sky UTE Fighting	March 17, 2007	2	4:25	Ignacio, Colorado, United States	
Win	11–12–1 (1)	David Watts	KO (punches)	TC 17: Proving Ground	October 21, 2006	1	0:55	Yuma, Arizona, United States	
Loss	10–12–1 (1)	Eugene Jackson	TKO (punches)	Strikeforce: Revenge	June 9, 2006	2	2:49	San Jose, California, United States	
Win	10–11–1 (1)	Stacy Hakes	TKO (corner stoppage)	Cage of Fire 1	April 22, 2006	1	3:27	Tijuana, Baja California, Mexico	
Loss	9–11–1 (1)	Edson Carvalho	N/A	MMA Fighting Challenge 4	December 3, 2005	N/A	N/A	Guadalajara, Jalisco, Mexico	
Loss	9–10–1 (1)	Stefanos Miltsakakis	Submission (kimura)	Universal Above Ground Fighting	July 28, 2005	1	N/A	Los Angeles, California, United States	
Loss	9–9–1 (1)	Aaron Licciardello	Decision (unanimous)	WEF: Sin City	May 20, 2005	3	5:00	Las Vegas, Nevada, United States	
Win	9–8–1 (1)	Stacy Hakes	Submission (verbal)	Xtreme Cage Fighter 8	April 9, 2005	1	2:10	Redding, California, United States	
Win	8–8–1 (1)	Josh Tamsen	TKO (punches)	Crown Fighting Championship 2	March 26, 2005	1	N/A	Rosarito Beach, Baja California, Mexico	
Loss	7–8–1 (1)	Art Santore	Submission (choke)	UAGF: Clover Combat	March 25, 2005	1	3:19	Santa Barbara, California, United States	
NC	7–7–1 (1)	Chilo Cordova	No Contest	PNRF: Inferno	January 22, 2005	N/A	N/A	Santa Fe, New Mexico, United States	
Loss	7–7–1	Ricco Rodriguez	Submission (rear-naked choke)	MMA Mexico: Day 2	December 18, 2004	1	1:06	Ciudad Juárez, Chihuahua, Mexico	
Loss	7–6–1	Jon Fitch	TKO (injury)	MMA Mexico: Day 1	December 17, 2004	2	2:35	Ciudad Juárez, Chihuahua, Mexico	
Loss	7–5–1	Dennis Hallman	Submission (rear-naked choke)	SF 6: Battleground in Reno	September 23, 2004	1	0:50	Reno, Nevada, United States	
Win	7–4–1	Paulo Gazze	TKO (punches)	Venom: First Strike	September 18, 2004	1	3:27	Huntington Beach, California, United States	
Win	6–4–1	Armando Aguirre	KO	CFC 1	September 4, 2004	1	0:36	Rosarito Beach, Baja California, Mexico	
Loss	5–4–1	Tony Bonello	Submission (rear-naked choke)	XFC 5: When Worlds Collide	August 13, 2004	1	N/A	Southport, Queensland, Australia	
Win	5–3–1	Cedric Marks	TKO (submission to punches)	RM 5: Road to the Championship	June 27, 2004	1	N/A	Tijuana, Baja California, Mexico	
Draw	4–3–1	Reggie Orr	Draw	KOTC 37: Unfinished Business	June 12, 2004	2	5:00	San Jacinto, California, United States	
Win	4–3	Ron Cushen	KO (punches)	Gladiator Challenge 25	April 20, 2004	1	0:39	Porterville, California, United States	
Win	3–3	Cedric Marks	TKO (submission to punches)	Total Combat 2	February 29, 2004	2	0:45	Tijuana, Baja California, Mexico	
Loss	2–3	Chad Davis	Submission (triangle choke)	KOTC 33: After Shock	February 20, 2004	2	1:47	San Jacinto, California, United States	
Win	2–2	Michael Martin	TKO (punch)	KOTC 31: King of the Cage 31	December 6, 2003	1	0:23	San Jacinto, California, United States	
Loss	1–2	Cedric Marks	Submission (rear-naked choke)	RM 4: Beat Down in Baja	September 14, 2003	2	1:53	Tijuana, Baja California, Mexico	
Win	1–1	Adam Rendon	TKO (punches)	Reto Maximo 3	March 14, 2003	1	4:10	Tijuana, Baja California, Mexico	
Loss	0–1	Chris Albandia	Submission (rear-naked choke)	Combate Libre Mexico 3	September 20, 2002	N/A	N/A	Mexico	

== Filmography ==
=== Film ===
Year	Title	Role	Notes
2007	Urban Justice	Jack	
2008	Felon	Williams	
2010	The Book of Eli	Door Guard	
2010	Deadly Impact	Associate	
2011	The Reunion	Octavio	
2012	21 Jump Street	One-Percenter #5 - Ed	
2012	Universal Soldier: Day of Reckoning	Unisol	
2014	The Outsider	Bruce	
2014	Dawn of the Planet of the Apes	Driver	
2014	Kristy	Black Hoodie	
2017	Armed Response	Rainier	
2019	Black and Blue	Buick Bad Guy	
2020	Project Power	Taylor	Uncredited

=== Television ===
Year	Title	Role	Notes
2007–2008	Prison Break	Octavio	3 episodes
2009–2010	Breaking Bad	Rival Dealer #1	3 episodes
2012	Breakout Kings	Cellmate	Episode: "Ain't Love (50) Grand? "
2012	Common Law	Hector	Episode: "Soul Mates"
2014	Star-Crossed	Masked Man / Man #2	2 episodes
2014, 2016, 2018	NCIS: New Orleans	Commando #2 / Driver	3 episodes
2015	Banshee	New Orleans Red Bone	Episode: "All the Wisdom I Got Left"
2015	Into the Badlands	Petri	6 episodes
2016–2018	The Walking Dead	Gary	12 episodes
2019	Queen of the South	Sicario #2	Episode: "Un Asunto de Familia"
2019	S.W.A.T.	Eddie Gomez	Episode: "Funny Money"
2019	Mayans M.C.	VM #5	Episode: "Kukulkan"
2023	This Fool	Sonny	Episode: "Clyde & Clyde, Pt 1 & 2"
