= Daniel Puder =

American professional wrestler and mixed martial arts fighter

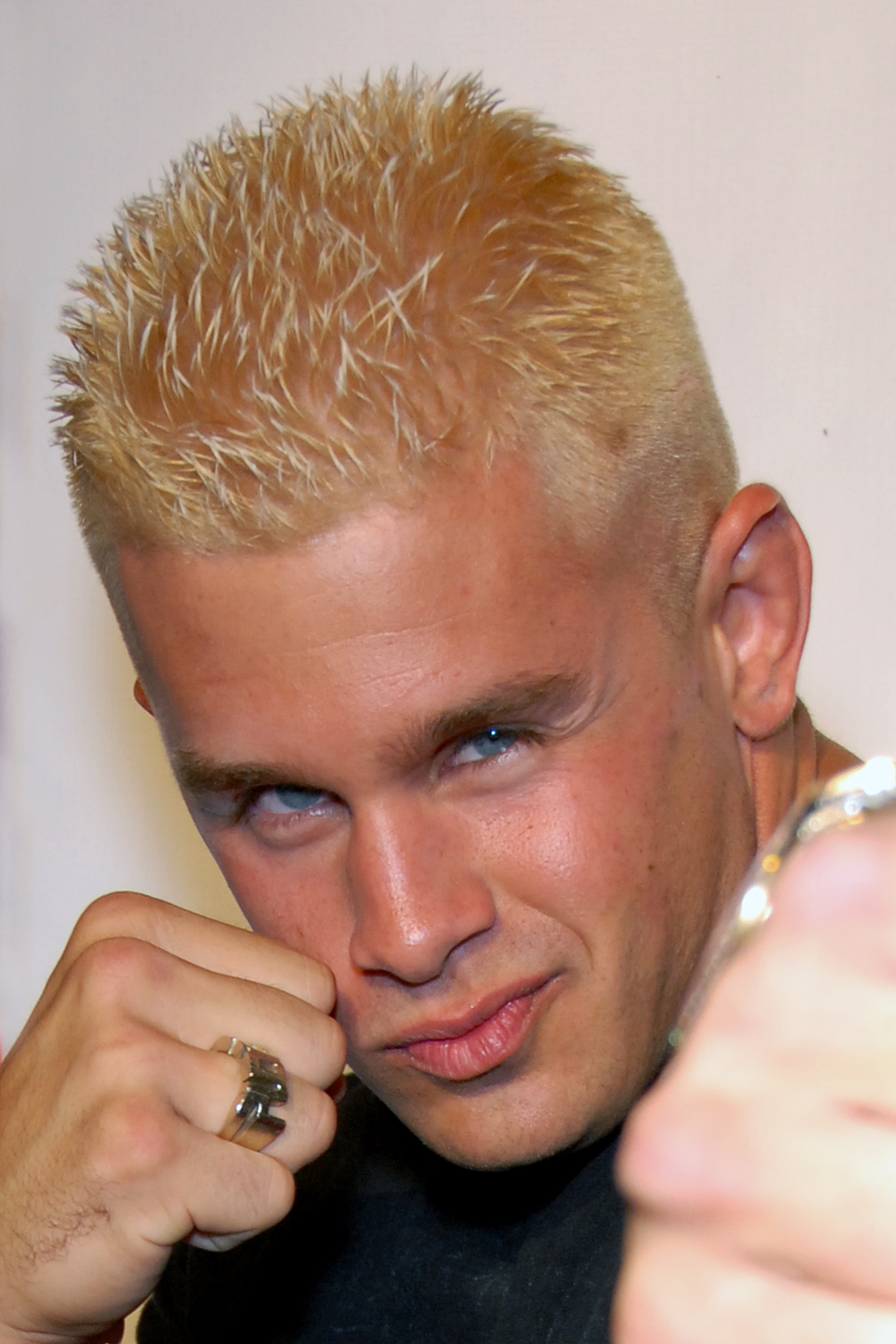
- Puder in 2008
- Born: Cupertino, California, U.S.
- Height: 6 ft 2 in (188 cm)
- Weight: 250 lb (113 kg; 17 st 12 lb)
- Division: Heavyweight
- Fighting out of: Cupertino, California
- Trainer: AKA, Bob Cook, Brian Johnston, Danny Chaid, Frank Shamrock, Javier Mendez
- Years active: 2003–2011

Mixed martial arts record
- Total: 8
- Wins: 8
- By knockout: 2
- By submission: 3
- By decision: 3
- Losses: 0

Daniel Puder
Professional wrestling career
- Ring name: Daniel Puder
- Billed height: 6 ft 3 in (191 cm)
- Billed weight: 235 lb (107 kg)
- Trained by: Al Snow; Bill DeMott; Lance Storm; Nightmare Danny Davis; OVW; Paul Heyman; Tommy Dreamer; Inoki Dojo
- Debut: 2004
- Retired: June 6, 2019

Daniel Puder (/ˈpjuːdər/ PYOO-dər) is an American retired professional wrestler and mixed martial artist.

As a mixed martial artist, Puder trained at the American Kickboxing Academy, in San Jose, California. He is undefeated in MMA competition, holding a record of eight wins and zero losses. As a professional wrestler, he trained at Ohio Valley Wrestling. He is best known for having won the WWE's $1,000,000 Tough Enough, the fourth Tough Enough competition. He has also worked for Ring of Honor and New Japan Pro Wrestling.

== Early life ==
Puder was born in the San Francisco Bay Area suburb of Cupertino, California, and was raised by his parents, Brent and Wanda Puder.

Puder started amateur wrestling when he was 12 years old. In high school at Monta Vista High School, in Cupertino, California, he finished first place in his weight division in the California Interscholastic Federation (CIF) Central Coast Section, in amateur wrestling, while wrestling with a broken hand. At the age of 16, he began training in mixed martial arts and professional wrestling.

== Professional wrestling career ==
=== World Wrestling Entertainment (2004–2005) ===
==== Tough Enough (2004–2005) ====
Puder entered the fourth Tough Enough competition that was conducted as part of WWE SmackDown between October and December 2004. The prize was announced as a $1,000,000 professional wrestling contract, however, it was in reality a four-year contract at $250,000 a year, with the option to terminate the contract after the first year.

On November 4, 2004, episode of SmackDown!, taped in St. Louis, Missouri, during an unscripted segment of Tough Enough, Kurt Angle, a former American amateur wrestler and 1996 Olympic gold medalist, challenged the finalists through a squat thrust competition. Chris Nawrocki won the competition and the prize of a shoot match against Angle. Angle quickly took Nawrocki down with a guillotine choke, but Nawrocki managed to make it to the ropes, forcing Angle to break the hold. Angle then took Nawrocki down with a double leg takedown, breaking his ribs. Angle locked another guillotine choke on Nawrocki, pinning him in the process. After Angle defeated Nawrocki, Angle challenged the other finalists. Puder accepted Angle's challenge.

Angle and Puder wrestled for position, with Angle taking Puder down. However, in the process, Puder locked Angle in a kimura lock. With Puder on his back and Angle's arm locked in the kimura, Angle attempted a pin, and one of two referees in the ring, Jim Korderas, quickly counted three to end the bout, despite the fact that Puder's shoulders were not fully down on the mat, bridging up at two. Dave Meltzer and Dave Scherer gave these following comments:

It was real. If you don't follow fighting, Puder had Angle locked in the Kimura, or keylock as Tazz called it, although Tazz didn't let on the move was fully executed. Not only was Angle not getting out of the move, but most MMA fighters would have tapped already. Angle couldn't tap for obvious reasons. The ref counted a three even though Puder's shoulders weren't fully down, trying to end the thing, because the reality was Angle would have been in surgery had it gone a few seconds longer or had Puder not given up the hold. ― Dave Meltzer

As you would expect, Kurt Angle was less than happy backstage at Smackdown after almost being forced to tap out to Tough Enough contestant Daniel Puder. Downright ticked off would probably be the best way to describe his mood. The unscripted nature of the contest was the main reason that Angle was made to look so bad since Puder just reacted to the situation and could have forced Angle to submit had the referees not thought quickly and counted a pin that wasn't there on Puder. ― Dave Scherer

On December 12, 2004, Puder competed in his first WWE pay-per-view event, Armageddon, defeating Mike Mizanin in a Dixie Dog Fight. Puder was announced as the winner on December 14, 2004 (televised on December 16, 2004).

On January 30, 2005, Puder competed in his second WWE pay-per-view event, being entered in the Royal Rumble match. Puder, however, was shortly eliminated after being chopped by Chris Benoit, Hardcore Holly, and Eddie Guerrero. Puder was eliminated by Holly.

==== Ohio Valley Wrestling (2005) ====
In January 2005, Puder participated in the WWE's developmental territory, Ohio Valley Wrestling (OVW). In September 2005, Puder was released by WWE as a cost-cutting move. Puder was given the option of signing a development contract with WWE and transferring to its Deep South Wrestling development camp with less pay, but Puder declined the offer. Puder gave this comment;

I'm proud of winning the very first ever Million Dollar Tough Enough. I'm proud that I adapted from MMA to WWE. I'm proud of my work in the ring with my pro wrestling trainers Lance Storm and more recently Al Snow, who was my Tough Enough trainer too. I am proud of my association with a man like Danny Davis. I am proud to have worked with Tommy Dreamer. I am proud and have enjoyed working with and learning from Paul Heyman, and all the opportunities this experience has presented. And I know I will use this experience to my advantage when I make my next long term career move. For the time being, I am headed back to Louisville, because Paul scheduled me in an OVW Title match against Johnny Jeter tomorrow night at the Davis Arena, 4400 Sheperdsville Road in Louisville. I hope it's my best pro wrestling match to date. I live up to my obligations and committments [sic]. That's the kind of man I am. And I'm going to show the world that at 23 years old, WWE thought short term and not long term with me. But I won't brag about it in advance. I'll prove it to everyone!!!!!!!! Thanks for all of your support.

In September 2007, Yahoo! Sports ran an interview with Puder. In the interview, Puder briefly mentioned his stay in Ohio Valley Wrestling. Puder said:

I was in OVW. And we had this one town in Kentucky we went to every week, it was basically an old barn. There were the same 20 people there every time, they all looked the same, they all had maybe three teeth each and they all had the same name. Finally, one night I walked in and saw all the inbreds and thought to myself, "What am I doing with my life?"

Kenny Bolin, a manager at OVW, took offense to this. Bolin then sent out the following email to Yahoo!:

I will open this reminding every one that I really liked Daniel during his OVW days. He was not too smart to the wrestling business but what young talent is these days?

My memories of Daniel Puder in OVW are quite different that what is stated here in your article. (I am assuming Daniel really said this) he was always giving away free pics, trading cards and T-shirts of him self to all the fans. He spent a fortune on this stuff and gave it to the fans, not to mention the 20 in a barn he claims to have seen every week. (I have no idea what town he is talking about) if he had not dozed off in training class and stayed off his lap top and cell phone 24/7 he may have drew more than 20 fans in what ever town he thinks he was in. We sure draw more than that now. We have capacity crowds (500 or so) turning away up to 50 to 200 fans every week at OVW TV tapings. We perform over 170 shows a year in the Louisville Metro area not to mention better than 100 additional shows around the tri state area. 12 shows a year at Six Flags Ky. Kingdom, 2 state fair shows and countless fund raisers.

I also remember Daniel cried like a baby the day he was released from WWE. Daniel may want to reflect back on his OVW days more accurately and appreciate any fans who took the time to come and see him in the future.

Thanks,

Kenny Bolin OVW

=== Ring of Honor (2007–2008) ===
In December 2007, Puder signed with Ring of Honor (ROH). On December 29, 2007, at the Manhattan Center, in New York City, Puder made his debut in ROH, at Rising Above, attacking Claudio Castagnoli and aligning himself with Sweet and Sour Inc., led by Larry Sweeney. On December 30, 2007, at Final Battle 2007, Puder helped Sweeney defeat Castagnoli. In January 2008, Puder would appear on two more shows, however, due to budget cuts, Puder was released.

=== New Japan Pro Wrestling (2010–2011) ===
On June 19, 2010, Puder made his debut for New Japan Pro Wrestling at Dominion 6.19, losing to former three–time IWGP Heavyweight Champion Shinsuke Nakamura. On October 11, 2010, it was announced that Puder would team with Nakamura in the 2010 G1 Tag League, which would take place over eleven shows in October and November. In their first match in the tournament on October 22, Puder and Nakamura were defeated by Hiroshi Tanahashi and TAJIRI. On October 25 Puder picked up his first victory in New Japan, defeating Tomoaki Honma via submission in a singles match. After two wins and three losses in the group stage of the G1 Tag League, Puder and Nakamura finished fourth in their block and did not advance to the semifinals.

=== Independent Circuit (2019) ===
Puder returned to wrestling for one night on June 6, 2019 when he teamed with Gangrel when they defeated Kris Karter and Nick Grayson at Gangrel's Wrestling Asylum in Miami, Florida.

== Mixed martial arts ==
While training at the American Kickboxing Academy, in San Jose, California, Puder sought the tutelage of Javier Mendez, Bob Cook, Frank Shamrock, Brian Johnston and Danny Chaid.

On September 6, 2003, at the X-1 promotion, Puder defeated Jay McCown by unanimous decision. On March 10, 2006, at Strikeforce: Shamrock vs. Gracie, at the HP Pavilion at San Jose, in San Jose, California, Puder made his return to MMA, defeating Jesse Fujarczyk by submission due to a rear naked choke. Three months later on June 9, 2006, at Strikeforce: Revenge, at the HP Pavilion at San Jose, in San Jose, California, Puder defeated Tom Tuggle by submission due to an armbar in only twenty-eight seconds. To end the year, on December 8 at Strikeforce: Triple Threat in San Jose, California, Puder defeated Mike Cook by submission due to a rear naked choke.

On February 18, 2007, at BodogFight Series III in Costa Rica, Puder defeated Michael Alden by knockout in forty-five seconds. Several months later on September 29, 2007, at Strikeforce: Playboy Mansion, at The Playboy Mansion, in Los Angeles, California, Puder defeated Richard Dalton by unanimous decision.

On May 16, 2009, at Call to Arms I, at the Citizens Business Bank Arena, in Ontario, California, Puder defeated Jeff Ford by knockout. On August 15, 2009, at Call to Arms: Called Out Fights in Ontario, California, Puder defeated Mychal Clark by unanimous decision.

Puder was scheduled to compete against Tank Abbott, an American mixed martial arts fighter and former professional wrestler. The bout was scheduled on February 26, 2011, at Knockout Fights: The Beginning, at the Santa Monica Airport, in Santa Monica, California, however, Puder withdrew from the bout due to injury, Puder had suffered a torn meniscus and was unable to compete. Abbott, however, had his own opinion on Puder’s withdraw; according to him, Puder noticed that Abbott had shown up in shape during a pre-fight news conference and subsequently pulled out of the bout, When informed of Abbott's account, Puder simply laughed and asked, "Tank, in shape?"

Puder retired from MMA competition, holding a record of eight wins and zero losses.

=== Coaching ===
In 2018, Puder provided mixed martial arts instruction using the private coaching service, CoachUp.

== Business career ==
In 2010, Puder founded My Life My Power (MLMP), an anti-bullying organization.

Puder also operates Puder Strength Training (PST), a non-profit organization that donates weight training equipment to high school strength training programs and to underprivileged teenagers. Puder was the official spokesperson for Cops Care Cancer Foundation. Puder also opened a gym the Knockouts Hollywood MMA Gym, in Hollywood, California, which specializes in martial arts, self-defense and fitness boot camp.

== Personal life ==
Puder is a born again Christian. He is a deputy sheriff.

== Mixed martial arts record ==
Professional record breakdown
8 matches	8 wins	0 losses
By knockout	2	0
By submission	3	0
By decision	3	0

Res.	Record	Opponent	Method	Event	Date	Round	Time	Location	Notes
Win	8–0	Mychal Clark	Decision (unanimous)	Call to Arms: Called Out Fights	August 15, 2009	3	5:00	Ontario, California, United States	
Win	7–0	Jeff Ford	TKO (shoulder injury)	Call to Arms I	May 16, 2009	1	1:23	Ontario, California, United States	
Win	6–0	Richard Dalton	Decision (unanimous)	Strikeforce: Playboy Mansion	September 29, 2007	3	5:00	Los Angeles, California, United States	
Win	5–0	Michael Alden	TKO (head kick and punches)	BodogFight Series III: Costa Rica Combat	February 18, 2007	1	0:45	Costa Rica	
Win	4–0	Mike Cook	Submission (rear-naked choke)	Strikeforce: Triple Threat	December 8, 2006	2	2:31	San Jose, California, United States	
Win	3–0	Tom Tuggle	Submission (armbar)	Strikeforce: Revenge	June 9, 2006	1	0:28	San Jose, California, United States	
Win	2–0	Jesse Fujarczyk	Submission (rear-naked choke)	Strikeforce: Shamrock vs. Gracie	March 10, 2006	1	1:54	San Jose, California, United States	
Win	1–0	Jay McCown	Decision (unanimous)	X-1	September 6, 2003	3	3:00	Yokohama, Japan	

== Championships and accomplishments ==
- World Wrestling Entertainment
  - $1,000,000 Tough Enough (2004)

== See also ==
- List of professional wrestlers by MMA record
