= Jason Von Flue =

American mixed martial arts fighter

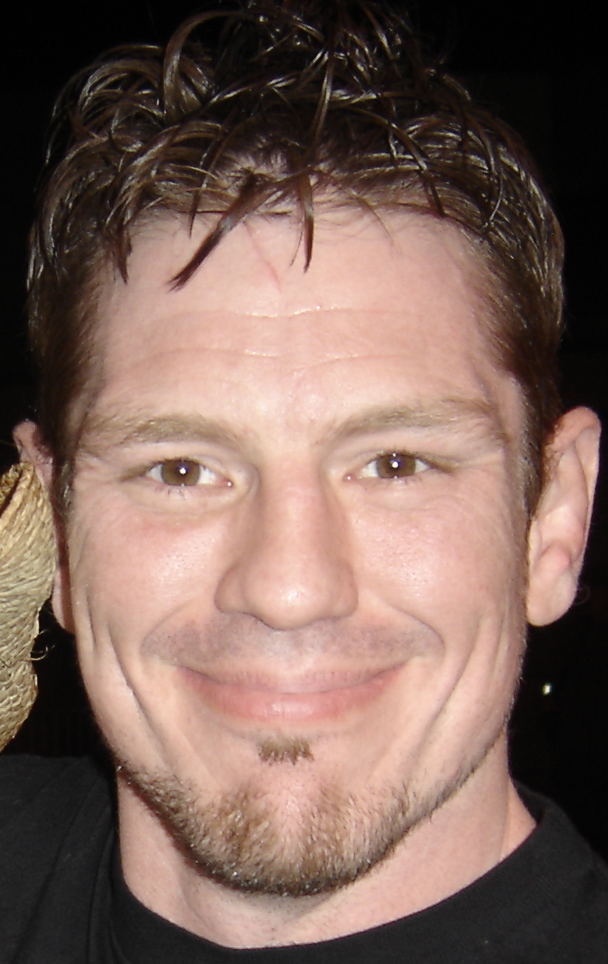
- Born: August 1, 1975 (age 51); Kerman, California, U.S.
- Other names: Livewire
- Height: 6 ft 0 in (1.83 m)
- Weight: 170 lb (77 kg; 12 st)
- Division: Welterweight; Middleweight
- Fighting out of: Albuquerque, New Mexico, United States
- Team: Jackson's Submission Fighting; The Pit (formerly)
- Rank: Brown belt in Brazilian jiu-jitsu
- Years active: 1999–2009

Mixed martial arts record
- Total: 27
- Wins: 14
- By knockout: 1
- By submission: 13
- Losses: 12
- By knockout: 8
- By submission: 3
- By decision: 1
- Draws: 1

Other information
- Mixed martial arts record from Sherdog

Jason Von Flue (born August 1, 1975) is an American former mixed martial artist who appeared on the second season of The Ultimate Fighter. A professional competitor since 1999, he has competed for the UFC, WEC, Strikeforce and King of the Cage.

In 2006, at UFC Ultimate Fight Night 3 against Alex Karalexis, Von Flue successfully applied a unique submission move to counter the guillotine choke that is now commonly referred to as the Von Flue choke. Additionally, since 2017, the "Von Flue choke" has occasionally been referred to as the "Von Preux Choke", due to its usage by Ovince Saint Preux.

== Mixed martial arts career ==
=== Early career ===
Von Flue made his professional MMA debut in June 1999, fighting and winning three times in one night on the International Fighting Championships WC 3: Warriors Challenge 3 show. Over the next six years, he amassed a record of 10 wins, 4 losses and 1 draw while fighting for promotions such as King of the Cage and World Extreme Cagefighting in his native California.

=== The Ultimate Fighter 2 ===
On episode three of The Ultimate Fighter 2, fighter Josh Burkman was asked to leave due to a broken arm and Von Flue came to the team of Matt Hughes as a replacement fighter. Considered the underdog, he went on to get an upset win in his first fight against Jorge Gurgel. Despite his performance, he was given to team Franklin when Hughes was forced to give up one of his members to the other team. He faced former teammate Joe Stevenson in the semifinals, losing due to an armbar submission. After his performance on the show, he was signed to a UFC contract.

=== Ultimate Fighting Championship ===
In his first match since the show, Von Flue fought at Ultimate Fight Night 3 where he defeated season one The Ultimate Fighter contestant Alex Karalexis via technical submission, as Karalexis was rendered unconscious by a shoulder choke from side control. This technique is now commonly known as a Von Flue Choke. Though this unique choke submission was around before Von Flue, he was perhaps the first person to get a technical submission on a large stage.

In his second UFC match at Ultimate Fight Night 4, he was defeated by fellow TUF 2 contestant Luke Cummo via decision.

For his third fight in the UFC, Von Flue faced Joe Riggs at UFC Fight Night 6 on August 17, 2006. He lost the fight via triangle choke submission, and was subsequently released from the promotion.

=== Strikeforce ===
Two months after his UFC release, Von Flue signed with now-defunct promotion Strikeforce. He debuted for the promotion on October 4, 2006, facing Eric Wray at Strikeforce: Tank vs. Buentello. He won the fight via arm-triangle choke.

Von Flue then faced Cung Le at Strikeforce: Triple Threat on December 8, 2006. He lost the fight via doctor stoppage TKO, due to a cut that opened up on Von Flue. Von Flue faced Luke Stewart at Strikeforce Shamrock vs. Baroni and lost via TKO in the third round. He was subsequently released from the promotion following this loss.

=== Independent promotions ===
In his last fight in mixed martial arts, Von Flue faced Marcus Gaines at TWC: Trauma on July 23, 2009. He lost the fight via second round submission. Von Flue was scheduled to return from a near five-year retirement and face Conor Cooke at Cage Contender 18 on April 26, 2014, however the bout would be cancelled prior to the event for unknown reasons.

== Championships and accomplishments ==
- Ultimate Fighting Championship
  - UFC Encyclopedia Awards
    - Submission of the Night (One time) vs. Alex Karalexis
  - UFC.com Awards
    - 2006: Ranked #10 Submission of the Year vs. Alex Karalexis

== Mixed martial arts record ==
Professional record breakdown
27 matches	14 wins	12 losses
By knockout	1	8
By submission	13	3
By decision	0	1
Draws	1	

Res.	Record	Opponent	Method	Event	Date	Round	Time	Location	Notes
Loss	14–12–1	Marcus Gaines	TKO (submission to punches to the body)	The Warriors Cage: Trauma	July 23, 2009	2	0:58	Porterville, California, United States	
Win	14–11–1	Steve Ramerez	Submission (rear-naked choke)	PureCombat: Backyard Brawl	March 7, 2009	1	2:54	Tulare, California, United States	
Loss	13–11–1	Kyle Pimentel	TKO (kick to the body)	CCFC: Rumble in the Park II	November 1, 2008	2	0:29	Fresno, California, United States	
Win	13–10–1	Bryson Kamaka	Submission (kneebar)	PureCombat: Hard Core	August 15, 2008	1	2:43	Visalia, California, United States	
Loss	12–10–1	Pete Spratt	KO (punches)	UWC: Invasion	April 26, 2008	2	0:59	Fairfax, Virginia, United States	
Loss	12–9–1	Brett Cooper	TKO (punches)	PURECOMBAT: From the Ashes	December 1, 2007	1	N/A	Visalia, California, United States	
Loss	12–8–1	Luke Stewart	TKO (punches)	Strikeforce Shamrock vs. Baroni	June 22, 2007	3	2:17	San Jose, California, United States	
Loss	12–7–1	Cung Le	TKO (doctor stoppage)	Strikeforce: Triple Threat	December 8, 2006	1	0:43	San Jose, California, United States	
Win	12–6–1	Eric Wray	Submission (arm-triangle choke)	Strikeforce: Tank vs. Buentello	October 4, 2006	2	4:42	Fresno, California, United States	
Loss	11–6–1	Joe Riggs	Submission (triangle choke)	UFC Fight Night 6	August 17, 2006	1	2:01	Las Vegas, Nevada, United States	
Loss	11–5–1	Luke Cummo	Decision (unanimous)	UFC Fight Night 4	April 6, 2006	3	5:00	Las Vegas, Nevada, United States	
Win	11–4–1	Alex Karalexis	Technical Submission (Von Flue choke)	UFC Fight Night 3	January 16, 2006	3	1:17	Las Vegas, Nevada, United States	
Win	10–4–1	Nick Davanzo	Submission (choke)	KOTC 49: Soboba	March 20, 2005	1	0:51	San Jacinto, California, United States	
Draw	9–4–1	Mac Danzig	Draw	GC 25: Gladiator Challenge 25	April 20, 2004	2	5:00	Porterville, California, United States	
Win	9–4	Chris Irvine	Submission (arm-triangle choke)	WEC 8	October 17, 2003	1	2:04	Lemoore, California, United States	
Win	8–4	Nick Gilardi	Technical Submission (Von Flue choke)	WEC 7	August 9, 2003	1	2:46	Lemoore, California, United States	
Loss	7–4	Bob Ostovich	Submission (heel hook)	Warriors Quest 2: Battle of Champions	August 1, 2001	1	N/A	Hawaii, United States	
Loss	7–3	Jim Walker	KO (punch)	IFC WC 12: Warriors Challenge 12	April 11, 2001	1	1:34	Friant, California, United States	
Loss	7–2	Ronald Jhun	TKO (punches)	IFC WC 10: Warriors Challenge 10	October 11, 2000	1	N/A	Friant, California, United States	
Win	7–1	Eric Meaders	Submission (ankle lock)	CFF: The Cobra Classic 2000	August 26, 2000	1	6:44	Anza, California, United States	
Win	6–1	Chris Ellerton	Submission (rear-naked choke)	IFC WC 8: Warriors Challenge 8	June 14, 2000	1	6:01	Friant, California, United States	
Win	5–1	Mike Voltz	Submission (neck crank)	CFF: Cobra Open	March 11, 2000	1	1:58	Anza, California, United States	
Win	4–1	Savant Young	KO (punch)	IFC WC 5: Warriors Challenge 5	September 18, 1999	N/A	N/A	Fresno, California, United States	
Loss	3–1	Toby Imada	Submission (armbar)	IFC WC 4: Warriors Challenge 4	August 7, 1999	2	5:08	Jackson, California, United States	
Win	3–0	Dave Marinoble	Submission (triangle choke)	IFC WC 3: Warriors Challenge 3	June 29, 1999	N/A	N/A	Jackson, California, United States	
Win	2–0	David Velasquez	Submission (choke)	IFC WC 3: Warriors Challenge 3	June 29, 1999	N/A	N/A	Jackson, California, United States	
Win	1–0	Danny Gryder	Submission (leglock)	IFC WC 3: Warriors Challenge 3	June 29, 1999	N/A	N/A	Jackson, California, United States	

=== Mixed martial arts exhibition match record ===
Professional record breakdown
2 matches	1 win	1 loss
By submission	0	1
By decision	1	0

Res.	Record	Opponent	Method	Event	Date	Round	Time	Location	Notes
Loss	1–1	Joe Stevenson	Submission (armbar)	The Ultimate Fighter 2	June 30, 2005	1	4:46	Las Vegas, Nevada, United States	
Win	1–0	Jorge Gurgel	Decision (unanimous)	The Ultimate Fighter 2	June 23, 2005	3	5:00	Las Vegas, Nevada, United States	advanced to TUF 2 semifinals
