= Cung Le =

American martial artist and actor (born 1972)

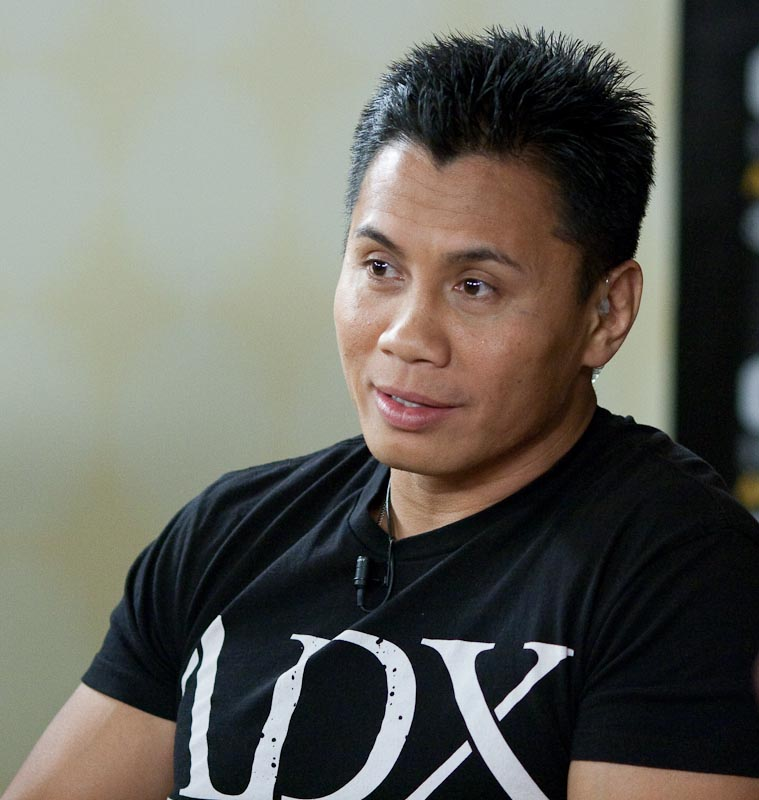
- Le on the set of Inside MMA in August 2009.
- Born: Cung Le; May 25, 1972 (age 54); Saigon, South Vietnam (Note: Now Ho Chi Minh City, Vietnam)
- Nationality: American
- Height: 5 ft 10 in (177 cm)
- Weight: 185 lb (84 kg; 13 st 3 lb)
- Division: Middleweight
- Reach: 70 in (180 cm)
- Style: Sanda
- Fighting out of: San Jose, California, United States
- Team: American Kickboxing Academy; Universal Strength Headquarters; US Wushu Team (1995-1999)
- Trainer: Shawn Liu (Sanshou)
- Rank: Black Belt in Taekwondo; All American in Wrestling

Kickboxing record
- Total: 17
- Wins: 17
- By knockout: 12
- Losses: 0
- Draws: 0

Mixed martial arts record
- Total: 12
- Wins: 9
- By knockout: 8
- By decision: 1
- Losses: 3
- By knockout: 3

Other information
- Spouse: Sunshine Spring Le
- Children: 2
- Website: www.cungleofficial.com
- Mixed martial arts record from Sherdog

Cung Le (Vietnamese: Lê Cung; born May 25, 1972) is an American actor, former professional mixed martial artist, Sanshou fighter and kickboxer. Le is perhaps best known in mixed martial arts for competing in Strikeforce, holding a record of 7–1 with the organization before its demise. He defeated Frank Shamrock to become the second Strikeforce Middleweight Champion before vacating the title to further pursue his acting career. He competed as a middleweight in the Ultimate Fighting Championship (UFC), holding a record of 2–2 with the organization. In kickboxing and sanshou, he is a former International Kickboxing Federation Light Heavyweight World Champion, having a professional kickboxing record of 17–0 before moving to mixed martial arts.

As an actor, Le has appeared in films such as Tekken, Pandorum, Fighting, Bodyguards and Assassins (all in 2009), The Man with the Iron Fists (2012), Puncture Wounds (2014), and Savage Dog (2017). He had a lead role in the martial arts film Dragon Eyes (2012), co-starring Jean-Claude Van Damme and produced by Joel Silver.

== Background ==
Cung Lê was born in Saigon, South Vietnam (now Ho Chi Minh City, Vietnam). In 1975, three days before the Fall of Saigon, Cung Le and his mother Anne left Vietnam by helicopter. Le's father stayed in Vietnam and was caught as a prisoner. After a few months in a refugee camp in the Philippines, Le ended up in San Jose, California, where early discrimination and bullying inspired him to learn martial arts. His mother enrolled him in Tae Kwon Do classes at the age of 10.

Le began wrestling competitively at age 14. After being inspired to box by Sylvester Stallone´s Rocky, Le graduated and earned All-American honors in wrestling his junior year at San Jose High School. He went on to wrestle for West Valley College in Saratoga, California, and won the California Junior College State Championship in the 158 lb weight class in 1990 also earning junior college All-American honors. Le also is practiced in a variety of martial arts such as Vovinam, Judo, Karate, Muay Thai, Boxing, Kuntao, Sambo, Brazilian Jiu-Jitsu, and Sanda - which became his main focus.. Le held a professional Kickboxing record of 17–0 and is a three-time world champion in Kickboxing.

== Sanshou and kickboxing career ==
Le has won three US Open International Martial Arts Championships (1994, 1995, 1996). In 1998 he won the Shidokan tournament championship. He has also won four US National Championships (Orlando, FL, 1994, Dallas, TX, 1995, Baltimore, MD, 1997). He earned three bronze medals in his amateur Sanshou world competition compiling an overall amateur record of 18–3. He has been a three-time bronze medalist at the World Wushu Championships in 1995 (Baltimore), 1997 (Italy), and 1999 (Hong Kong), and was the team captain during the later two editions. On December 15, 2001, he defeated Shonie Carter by unanimous decision in San Jose, California, to win the IKF International Kickboxing Federation Pro Light Heavyweight Sanda World Title. In May 2003, Le entered into K-1 competitions where he garnered a 3–0 career record, including one knockout.

== Mixed martial arts career ==
=== Strikeforce ===
Le made his mixed martial arts debut at Strikeforce: Shamrock vs. Gracie on March 10, 2006, at the HP Pavilion at San Jose, knocking out kickboxing rival Mike Altman at 3:51 of the first round. Le first met Altman in San Jose, in 1999, in a kickboxing bout where he defeated Altman via a body shot in the third round. Three months later he faced KOTC veteran Brian Warren, knocking him out at 4:19 of the first round. Le had also faced Warren in a K-1 Sanshou bout where he won by decision. At Strikeforce: Triple Threat on December 8, 2006, Le defeated UFC veteran Jason Von Flue in 0:43 of round one, when the fight had to be stopped due to a cut from a kick. Le went on to fight Tony Fryklund. Le beat Fryklund via TKO due to strikes late in the third round. Soon after, Le fought Sammy Morgan at Strikeforce: Four Men Enter, One Man Survives where he won the bout via TKO.

On March 29, 2008, at Strikeforce: Shamrock vs. Le, Le defeated long time MMA veteran Frank Shamrock in a fight co-promoted by Strikeforce and EliteXC at the HP Pavilion in San Jose. Le won via TKO when Shamrock's right arm (ulna) was broken after a series of kicks, making him the new Strikeforce Middleweight Champion. On September 17, 2009, Strikeforce CEO Scott Coker announced that Le had relinquished his belt after securing a major motion picture deal.

Twenty-one months after his last fight, Le returned to Strikeforce to face Scott Smith at Strikeforce: Evolution on December 19, 2009. Le suffered his first MMA defeat there, losing via TKO at 3:25 of the third round. After the match, Le expressed interest in an immediate rematch with Smith. His wish was granted on June 26, Strikeforce: Fedor vs. Werdum, in which Le defeated Smith via TKO in the second round to avenge his only MMA loss at the time.

=== Ultimate Fighting Championship ===
Le has said that it is basically the UFC or bust for him at this point in his fighting career. "I know for a fact that if I do fight again, it's going to be in the UFC. I've never fought in the UFC, but I would love to fight in the UFC. But right now because of my contract with Showtime and Strikeforce, hopefully things can work out because there is a show in San Jose that Cain Velasquez is the main event. I would love to fight in San Jose for the UFC ...." In an interview with BloodyElbow on October 27, 2011, Le revealed he originally signed a six-fight contract with the UFC.

Le was briefly linked to a matchup with Vitor Belfort on November 19, 2011, at UFC 139. However, Belfort was removed from the bout and replaced by former Pride FC Middleweight Champion Wanderlei Silva. Le managed to confuse Silva with his unorthodox kicks, and landed a spinning backfist that dropped Silva. During the second round, Silva managed to shake Le with huge punches and knees that completely broke Le's nose. Le was stunned, bloodied and fell to the ground, and the fight was stopped by the referee. Afterwards, in the press conference, Dana White commented that it was a good stoppage and that Cung was taken to the hospital.

Le was scheduled to face former UFC Middleweight Champion Rich Franklin on July 7, 2012, at UFC 148. However, due to an injury to headliner Vitor Belfort, Franklin instead faced Wanderlei Silva in a 190 lb catchweight rematch on June 23, 2012, at UFC 147. Le instead faced former title contender Patrick Côté. He earned his first UFC win via unanimous decision (30-27, 30-27, 30-27).

Le faced Rich Franklin in the main event on November 10, 2012, at UFC: Macao. Cung Le won the fight via KO with a powerful hook punch to Franklin's head at 2:17 of the first round.

==== The Ultimate Fighter: China ====
In November 2013, it was announced that Le would serve as the chief coach and mentor on The Ultimate Fighter: China, the China-based version of The Ultimate Fighter which began airing in December 2013.

After over a year-and-a-half of being away from competition, Le faced Michael Bisping on August 23, 2014, at UFC Fight Night 48. After an even start, Le was cut around both eyes in the second round, as Bisping began to land the more powerful strikes. Bisping eventually won the one sided fight via TKO in the fourth round. Following the fight, Le tested positive for elevated levels of HGH and was subsequently suspended from competition for nine months. However, after reevaluating the evidence against Le, the UFC increased his suspension to 12 months. There has been some dispute of the test, as the testing laboratory in question was not WADA-approved, did not do the appropriate HGH test, and destroyed the blood sample before confirmatory tests could be done. Ultimately, on October 21, the UFC reversed their decision and rescinded Le's suspension in light of the aforementioned flaws. On December 3, 2014, Le told the media that he instructed his manager to request Le's release from UFC due to the drug-test dispute.

On December 16, 2014, Le was listed as one of three MMA fighters who filed a class-action lawsuit against Zuffa, LLC., the parent company of the UFC. The suit alleges that the UFC participated in anti-competitive practices that hindered fighters and their mixed martial arts careers. At the time Le was the only active fighter on the organization's roster to be involved in the lawsuit.

=== Retirement from MMA ===
On January 20, 2015, his manager, Gary Ibarra, announced to the media that Le had retired from MMA. Le's decision came after reconsidering his career with his family. He had previously expressed his lack of desire to fight in the UFC and contemplated retirement following the performance-enhancing drug disputes he had with the promotion in 2014. Le believed that the UFC owed him an apology for accusing him of using drugs when the test results later turned out to be faulty. Le, however, said that his retirement was only in MMA. He talked about the possibility of returning to professional kickboxing competitions, where he was active prior to his MMA debut.

== Acting career ==
Le co-starred in the live-action Tekken film, based upon the popular martial arts fighting game, as Marshall Law, released November 5, 2009, for the American film market. Le had supporting roles in the science fiction film Pandorum with Dennis Quaid and Ben Foster, and Fighting, released in 2009 alongside Channing Tatum. He also starred in a Hong Kong martial arts film Bodyguards and Assassins, which was released on December 18, 2009; his film was the first time he worked with and had a fight scene with Hong Kong martial arts superstar Donnie Yen.

He also appeared in a Vietnamese music show Paris By Night 99 – Tôi Là Người Việt Nam where he was interviewed by Nguyen Cao Ky Duyen; this show also marked one of the few times Le has spoken Vietnamese on camera.

Le had a lead role in the 2012 action film Dragon Eyes, costarring Jean-Claude Van Damme and produced by Joel Silver. The movie is based on the Akira Kurosawa classic Yojimbo and is "MMA-themed". Also in 2012, Le played Bronze Lion in The Man with the Iron Fists, a film directed by RZA.

In 2014, he starred in Puncture Wounds, an action film directed by Giorgio Serafini, co-directed and written by James Coyne.

In 2015, he appeared as an abbot in the AMC TV series Into the Badlands.

In 2017, he appeared in the action movie Savage Dog alongside martial artists and action stars Scott Adkins and Marko Zaror.

=== Film and television credits ===
Year	Title	Role	Notes
1997	Sleight of Hand	Victor	
2001	Walker, Texas Ranger	Himself	TV series episode: "Legends"
2004	Kwoon	Mort Ission	Direct-to-video
2006	Dark Assassin	The Assassin	
2007	Blizhniy Boy: The Ultimate Fighter	Erik	
2009	Fighting	Dragon Le	
2009	Pandorum	Manh	
2009	Bodyguards and Assassins	Sa Zhen-Shan	
2009	Tekken	Marshall Law	
2010	True Legend	Militia Leader	
2010	NCIS: Los Angeles	Himself	TV series episode: "Hand-to-Hand"
2012	Dragon Eyes	Ryan Hong	
2012	The Man with the Iron Fists	Bronze Lion	
2013	The Grandmaster	Tiexieqi	
2014	The Ultimate Fighter: China	Mentor	Reality TV series
2014	Puncture Wounds	John Nguyen	
2015–2017	Into the Badlands	Cyan / Abbot 1	TV series; 4 episodes
2015	Hawaii Five-0	Yakuza member	TV series episode: "Pa'a Ka 'ipuka I Ka 'Upena Nananana"
2017	Savage Dog	Corporal Chef Boon	alongside Scott Adkins and Marko Zaror
2017	Security	Dead Eyes	
2018	Europe Raiders	Black Mantis	

== Fighting style ==
Cung Le was primarily a stand-up fighter known for his highly unorthodox striking. Drawing from his backgrounds in Sanshou, Taekwondo, Wrestling, and Brazilian Jiu-Jitsu. He had a particularly dangerous kicking game. He was perhaps best known for his use of the spinning back kick and spinning backfist, which he used to win multiple fights by knockout.

== Personal life ==
Le credits his heroes or inspirational figures in martial arts to be Bruce Lee, Gordon Liu, Jackie Chan, and Jet Li.

Le has two sons with his ex-wife. He is married to a Native American bikini model Sunshine Spring Le.

He often honors Vietnamese communities with the flag of South Vietnam in his fighting uniforms to remember his Vietnamese heritage.

He is fluent in both English and Vietnamese.

Le is a Christian and openly expresses his faith throughout social media.

== Championships and accomplishments ==
=== Kickboxing ===
- International Kickboxing Federation
  - IKF Sanshou World Light Heavyweight Championship (one time)
- International Sport Karate Association
  - ISKA Sanshou North American Light Heavyweight Sanshou Championship (one time)
  - ISKA Sanshou U.S. Light Heavyweight Championship (one time)
  - ISKA Sanshou U.S. Light Cruiserweight Championship (one time)
- Ho Tet Tae Kwon Do
  - Ho Tet Tae Kwon Do Tournament 1994 Grand Champion
- USA International World Championships
  - 1996 Continuous Sparring Tae Kwon Do World Champion
- World Wide Draka Federation
  - 1998 Draka Tournament winner
- Shidokan Cup Bare-Knuckle Full Contact Karate
  - 1998 Shidokan Cup U.S. Tournament winner

=== Wushu sanda ===
- International Wushu Federation
  - 1999 WUF World Wushu Championships Sanshou bronze medalist
  - 1997 WUF World Wushu Championships Sanshou bronze medalist
  - 1995 WUF World Wushu Championships Sanshou bronze medalist
- Black Belt Magazine
  - 2007 Kung Fu Artist of the Year

=== Submission grappling ===
- Amateur Athletic Union
  - AAU Espoir Sambo National Championship (1989)

=== Mixed martial arts ===
- Strikeforce
  - Strikeforce Middleweight Championship (one time)
  - Tied most finishes in Strikeforce (7)
  - Most knockouts in Strikeforce (7)
- Ultimate Fighting Championship
  - Fight of the Night (One time)
  - Knockout of the Night (One time)
  - UFC.com Awards
    - 2011: Ranked #8 Fight of the Year vs. Wanderlei Silva
    - 2012: Ranked #2 Knockout of the Year vs. Rich Franklin
- MMA Fighting
  - 2012 Knockout of the Year vs. Rich Franklin at UFC on Fuel TV 6
- Inside MMA
  - 2008 Fight of the Year Bazzie Award vs. Frank Shamrock at Strikeforce: Shamrock vs. Le

=== Amateur wrestling ===
- California Community College Athletic Association
  - CCCAA State Championship (1990)
  - CCCAA All-State (1990)
  - West Valley College wrestling team captain (1990, 1991)
- California Interscholastic Federation
  - CIF All-State (1989)
- Amateur Athletic Union
  - AAU Espoir Freestyle National Championship (1989)
  - AAU Espoir Greco-Roman National Championship (1989)

== Mixed martial arts record ==
Professional record breakdown
12 matches	9 wins	3 losses
By knockout	8	3
By decision	1	0

Res.	Record	Opponent	Method	Event	Date	Round	Time	Location	Notes
Loss	9–3	Michael Bisping	TKO (knee and punches)	UFC Fight Night: Bisping vs. Le	August 23, 2014	4	0:57	Macau, SAR, China	
Win	9–2	Rich Franklin	KO (punch)	UFC on Fuel TV: Franklin vs. Le	November 10, 2012	1	2:17	Macau, SAR, China	Knockout of the Night; Knockout of the Year (2012).
Win	8–2	Patrick Côté	Decision (unanimous)	UFC 148	July 7, 2012	3	5:00	Las Vegas, Nevada, United States	
Loss	7–2	Wanderlei Silva	TKO (knees and punches)	UFC 139	November 19, 2011	2	4:49	San Jose, California, United States	Fight of the Night.
Win	7–1	Scott Smith	KO (body kick)	Strikeforce: Fedor vs. Werdum	June 26, 2010	2	1:46	San Jose, California, United States	
Loss	6–1	Scott Smith	KO (punches)	Strikeforce: Evolution	December 19, 2009	3	3:25	San Jose, California, United States	
Win	6–0	Frank Shamrock	TKO (broken arm)	Strikeforce: Shamrock vs. Le	March 29, 2008	3	5:00	San Jose, California, United States	Won the Strikeforce Middleweight Championship. Later vacated title. Fight of the Year (2008).
Win	5–0	Sam Morgan	KO (body kick)	Strikeforce: Four Men Enter, One Man Survives	November 16, 2007	3	1:58	San Jose, California, United States	
Win	4–0	Tony Fryklund	KO (punch)	Strikeforce: Shamrock vs. Baroni	June 22, 2007	3	0:25	San Jose, California, United States	
Win	3–0	Jason Von Flue	TKO (doctor stoppage)	Strikeforce: Triple Threat	December 8, 2006	1	0:43	San Jose, California, United States	
Win	2–0	Brian Warren	TKO (punches)	Strikeforce: Revenge	June 9, 2006	1	4:19	San Jose, California, United States	
Win	1–0	Mike Altman	KO (punch)	Strikeforce: Shamrock vs. Gracie	March 10, 2006	1	3:51	San Jose, California, United States	

== Kickboxing record ==
kickboxing record
17 wins (9 KOs), 0 losses
Date	Result	Opponent	Event	Location	Method	Round	Time	Record	Notes
June 4, 2005	Win	Brian Ebersole	Strikeforce	San Jose, California	Decision (unanimous)	5	N/A	17–0	
April 30, 2004	Win	Brian Warren	K-1 World Grand Prix 2004 in Las Vegas I	Las Vegas, Nevada	Decision (unanimous)	4	2:00	16–0	
August 15, 2003	Win	Phil Petit	K-1 World Grand Prix 2003 in Las Vegas II	Las Vegas, Nevada	Decision (unanimous)	4	2:00	15–0	
May 2, 2003	Win	Scott Sheely	K-1 World Grand Prix 2003 in Las Vegas	Las Vegas, Nevada	TKO (strikes)	2	1:13	14–0	
December 15, 2001	Win	Shonie Carter	Strikeforce	San Jose, California	Decision (unanimous)	5	N/A	13–0	Won IKF World Light Heavyweight Sanshou Championship
September 15, 2000	Win	Jeff Thornhill	Strikeforce	San Jose, California	KO (spinning back fist)	3	N/A	12–0	Won ISKA North American Light Heavyweight Championship
August 5, 2000	Win	Laimon M. Keita	K-1 USA Championships 2000	Las Vegas, Nevada	Decision (unanimous)	5	3:00	11–0	Defended ISKA U.S. Light Heavyweight Sanshou Championship
May 13, 2000	Win	Mike Altman	Strikeforce	San Jose, California	KO (double roundhouse kick)	3	0:30	10–0	Defended ISKA Light Cruiserweight Sanshou Championship
1999	Win	Na Shun Gerile	Art of War: China vs. USA	Honolulu, Hawaii	TKO (scissor kick)	3	N/A	9–0	
May 15, 1999	Win	Scott Sheely	Strikeforce	San Jose, California	TKO (broken cheek bone)	2	0:59	8–0	Won ISKA U.S. Light Heavyweight Sanshou Championship
October 10, 1998	Win	Dan Garett	Strikeforce	San Jose, California	KO (body kick)	3	0:20	7–0	Won ISKA Light Cruiserweight Sanshou Championship
August 29, 1998	Win	Arne Soldwedel	1998 Shidokan Cup	Chicago, Illinois	KO (right hook)	7	N/A	6–0	Won Shidokan Team USA Championship, 1998 U.S. Shidokan Cup final
August 29, 1998	Win	Laimon M. Keita	1998 Shidokan Cup	Chicago, Illinois	Submission (foot lock)	2	N/A	5–0	1998 U.S. Shidokan Cup semifinal
August 29, 1998	Win	Ben Harris	1998 Shidokan Cup	Chicago, Illinois	KO (spinning hook kick)	2	N/A	4–0	1998 U.S. Shidokan Cup quarterfinal
May 24, 1998	Win	Minaru Taro	Draka V	Los Angeles, California	KO (head kick)	1	N/A	3–0	1998 Draka Tournament final
May 24, 1998	Win	Gaik Isrelyan	Draka V	Los Angeles, California	Decision (unanimous)	5	N/A	2–0	1998 Draka Tournament semifinal
August 31, 1997	Win	Jason Yee	1997 Kung Fu Championships	Orlando, Florida	Decision (unanimous)	5	N/A	1–0	
Legend: Win Loss Draw/No contest Notes

== See also ==
- List of Strikeforce champions

== Notes ==
Preceded by Frank Shamrock	2nd Strikeforce Middleweight Champion; March 29, 2008 – September 17, 2009	Vacant Le stepped down due to filming obligations Title next held by Jake Shields
