= Eugene Jackson (fighter) =

American mixed martial arts fighter

- Born: September 23, 1966 (age 60); United States
- Other names: The Wolf
- Height: 5 ft 8 in (1.73 m)
- Weight: 185 lb (84 kg; 13 st 3 lb)
- Division: Middleweight; Light Heavyweight
- Style: Kung Fu, Wrestling
- Fighting out of: East Palo Alto, California, United States
- Team: Gladiators Training Academy
- Rank: Black Belt in Kung Fu
- Years active: 1998-2007

Mixed martial arts record
- Total: 25
- Wins: 15
- By knockout: 4
- By submission: 10
- By decision: 1
- Losses: 9
- By knockout: 4
- By submission: 5
- Draws: 1

Other information
- Mixed martial arts record from Sherdog

Eugene Jackson (born September 23, 1966) is an American former mixed martial artist who competed in the middleweight division of the Ultimate Fighting Championship and Strikeforce. Jackson was the only Strikeforce U.S. Middleweight Champion.

== Mixed martial arts career ==
=== Early career ===
Jackson compiled a professional mixed martial arts record of 9-3-1 that included winning the Bas Rutten Invitational 1 Middleweight tournament over Joe Doerksen as well as losing to future Pride Middleweight Champion, Wanderlei Silva whilst competing for the IVC Cruiserweight Championship before signing for UFC in 1999.

=== Ultimate Fighting Championship ===
Jackson made his UFC debut at middleweight on July 16, 1999, against Royce Alger at UFC 21. He won the fight via KO with punches in the second round.

Jackson then faced Keiichiro Yamamiya on November 19, 1999, at UFC 23. He won the fight via KO with a punch in the third round.

Jackson then faced Sanae Kikuta on April 14, 2000, at UFC 25. He lost the fight via an armbar submission in the first round.

Jackson then faced Jeremy Horn on September 22, 2000, at UFC 27. He lost the fight via an armbar submission in the first round.

Jackson then faced Ricardo Almeida on September 28, 2001, at UFC 33. He lost the fight via a triangle choke submission in the first round.

Jackson then faced Keith Rockel on January 11, 2002, at UFC 35. He won the fight via a guillotine choke submission in the second round thus snapping a three-fight losing streak.

Jackson's final UFC bout came against Mark Weir on July 13, 2002, at UFC 38. He lost the fight via KO with a punch in the first round.

=== Strikeforce ===
Jackson made his Strikeforce debut against Jorge Ortiz on March 10, 2006, at Strikeforce: Shamrock vs. Gracie. He won the fight via unanimous decision.

Jackson then faced Mike Seal on June 9, 2006, at Strikeforce: Revenge. He won the fight via TKO due to punches in the second round.

Jackson then faced Ronald Jhun for the inaugural Strikeforce U.S. Middleweight Championship on December 8, 2006, at Strikeforce: Triple Threat. He won the fight via a rear naked choke submission in the first round thus being the sole person to win the title.

Jackson's final fight came against Joe Riggs on September 29, 2007, at Strikeforce: Playboy Mansion. He lost the fight via KO due to punches in the first round.

== Personal life ==
Jackson appeared as a playable character in the video game, Ultimate Fighting Championship that was released in 2000.

Jackson is the father of two sons, Nikko and Casey who were both mixed martial artists and worked as martial arts trainers at East Palo Alto gym and Rogue Empire respectively. Nikko died in September 2020.

Jackson runs Gladiators Training Academy in East Palo Alto, California, wherein he has trained fighters that include UFC alumni, Ashlee Evans-Smith.

Additionally, Jackson works for East Palo Alto youth empowerment charity, Live in Peace.

== Championships and accomplishments ==
- Bas Rutten Invitational 1
  - Bas Rutten Invitational 1 Middleweight Tournament
- Strikeforce
  - Strikeforce U.S. Middleweight Championship (One time, first, last)
- Ultimate Fighting Championship
  - UFC Encyclopedia Awards
    - Fight of the Night (One time) vs. Keiichiro Yamamiya
    - Knockout of the Night (One time) vs. Royce Alger
    - Submission of the Night (One time) vs. Keith Rockel

== Mixed martial arts record ==
Professional record breakdown
25 matches	15 wins	9 losses
By knockout	4	4
By submission	10	5
By decision	1	0
Draws	1	

Res.	Record	Opponent	Method	Event	Date	Round	Time	Location	Notes
Loss	15–9–1	Joe Riggs	KO (punches)	Strikeforce: Playboy Mansion	September 29, 2007	1	3:56	Los Angeles, California, United States	
Win	15–8–1	Ronald Jhun	Submission (rear-naked choke)	Strikeforce: Triple Threat	December 8, 2006	1	2:01	San Jose, California, United States	Won the Strikeforce U.S. Middleweight Championship
Win	14–8–1	Mike Seal	TKO (punches)	Strikeforce: Revenge	June 9, 2006	2	2:49	San Jose, California, United States	
Win	13–8–1	Jorge Ortiz	Decision (unanimous)	Strikeforce: Shamrock vs. Gracie	March 10, 2006	3	5:00	San Jose, California, United States	
Loss	12–8–1	Tony Fryklund	TKO (guillotine choke)	Battleground 1: War Cry	July 19, 2003	1	3:38	Chicago, Illinois, United States	
Loss	12–7–1	Mark Weir	KO (punch)	UFC 38	July 13, 2002	1	0:10	London, England	
Win	12–6–1	Keith Rockel	Submission (guillotine choke)	UFC 35	January 11, 2002	2	3:46	Uncasville, Connecticut, United States	
Loss	11–6–1	Ricardo Almeida	Submission (triangle choke)	UFC 33	September 28, 2001	1	4:06	Las Vegas, Nevada, United States	
Loss	11–5–1	Jeremy Horn	Submission (armbar)	UFC 27	September 22, 2000	1	4:32	New Orleans, Louisiana, United States	
Loss	11–4–1	Sanae Kikuta	Submission (armbar)	UFC 25	April 14, 2000	1	4:38	Tokyo, Tokyo, Canada	
Win	11–3–1	Keiichiro Yamamiya	KO (punch)	UFC 23	November 19, 1999	3	3:12	Urayasu, Chiba, Japan	
Win	10–3–1	Royce Alger	KO (punch)	UFC 21	July 16, 1999	2	1:19	Cedar Rapids, Iowa, United States	
Loss	9–3–1	Wanderlei Silva	TKO (submission to punches)	IVC 10: World Class Champions	April 27, 1999	1	0:32	Brazil	For IVC Cruiserweight Championship.
Win	9–2–1	Jake Laroche	KO (punches)	WCNHBC: West Coast NHB Championships 2	February 28, 1999	1	8:17	Compton, California, United States	
Win	8–2–1	Joe Doerksen	Submission (neck crank)	BRI 1: Bas Rutten Invitational 1	February 6, 1999	1	1:15	Denver, Colorado, United States	Won Bas Rutten Invitational Middleweight Tournament
Win	7–2–1	Tom Bolger	Submission (guillotine choke)	BRI 1: Bas Rutten Invitational 1	February 6, 1999	1	0:24	Denver, Colorado, United States	Bas Rutten Invitational Middleweight Tournament Semifinal
Win	6–2–1	Joe Riley	Submission (choke)	BRI 1: Bas Rutten Invitational 1	February 6, 1999	1	0:25	Denver, Colorado, United States	Bas Rutten Invitational Middleweight Tournament Quarterfinal
Win	5–2–1	Mark Walker	Submission (forearm choke)	BRI 1: Bas Rutten Invitational 1	February 6, 1999	1	0:57	Denver, Colorado, United States	Bas Rutten Invitational Middleweight Tournament First Round
Draw	4–2–1	Beau Hershberger	Draw	NG 9: Neutral Grounds 9	January 10, 1999	1	10:00		
Win	4–2	Ronald Jhun	Technical Submission (forearm choke)	SB 8: SuperBrawl 8	August 4, 1998	1	1:17	Honolulu, Hawaii, United States	
Win	3–2	Dustin Dawson	Technical Submission (rear-naked choke)	SB 8: SuperBrawl 8	August 4, 1998	1	0:19	Honolulu, Hawaii, United States	
Loss	2–2	Tim Lajcik	Submission (rear-naked choke)	IFC WC 2: Warriors Challenge 2	May 23, 1998	1	9:49	California, United States	IFC WC 2 Tournament Finals
Win	2–1	Mason White	Submission (choke)	IFC WC 2: Warriors Challenge 2	May 23, 1998	1	2:40	California, United States	IFC WC 2 Semifinals
Win	1–1	Toby Oberdine	Submission (rear-naked choke)	IFC WC 2: Warriors Challenge 2	May 23, 1998	1	2:31	California, United States	IFC WC 2 Quarterfinals
Loss	0–1	M Wahyudi	Submission (armbar)	IFC WC 1: Warriors Challenge 1	March 21, 1998	0	0:00	Jackson, California, United States	

== See also ==
- List of male mixed martial artists
