= Ronald Jhun =

American mixed martial arts fighter

- Born: September 21, 1970 (age 56); Honolulu, Hawaii, United States
- Other names: The Machine Gun
- Height: 5 ft 11 in (1.80 m)
- Weight: 170 lb (77 kg; 12 st)
- Division: Middleweight; Welterweight
- Stance: Orthodox
- Fighting out of: Honolulu, Hawaii, United States
- Team: 808 Top Team; Jesus Is Lord (formerly)
- Years active: 1998–2013

Professional boxing record
- Total: 1
- Losses: 1
- By knockout: 1

Mixed martial arts record
- Total: 52
- Wins: 24
- By knockout: 13
- By submission: 4
- By decision: 7
- Losses: 26
- By knockout: 5
- By submission: 14
- By decision: 7
- Draws: 2

Other information
- Mixed martial arts record from Sherdog

Ronald Jhun (born September 21, 1970) is an American professional mixed martial artist who most recently competed in the Welterweight division. A professional competitor since 1998, Jhun has formerly competed for the UFC, Strikeforce, Shooto, King of the Cage, Rumble on the Rock, and the World Fighting Alliance. Jhun is the former King of the Cage Welterweight Champion.

== Background ==
Born and raised in Honolulu, Hawaii, Jhun competed in football through high school and also competed in wrestling during his junior and senior years. After graduating, Jhun was introduced to mixed martial arts by his brother-in-law, Ray Cooper, and David Pa'aluhi, who would both also go on to have success as professional MMA fighters.

== Mixed martial arts career ==
=== Early career ===
Jhun made his professional mixed martial arts debut in 1998, competing under the SuperBrawl banner. Jhun compiled an overall record of 21–11–1 and won the King of the Cage Welterweight Championship before being signed by the UFC.

=== UFC and Strikeforce ===
Jhun made his UFC debut on August 21, 2004 at UFC 49 against Chris Lytle. Jhun was defeated via guillotine choke submission in the first round.

Jhun returned to the regional circuit, and went on a ten-fight losing streak during which he competed at Strikeforce: Triple Threat against Eugene Jackson in a Middleweight bout on December 8, 2006. Jhun, who had faced Jackson in his professional debut, again lost in the rematch via rear-naked choke submission in the first round.

=== Independent promotions ===
Jhun has gone 2–6 in his last eight fights, but on August 7, 2010, defeated Michael Winkelspecht via rear-naked choke submission in the second round to become the X-1 Middleweight Champion.

== Personal life ==
Jhun is married and has five children.

== Mixed martial arts record ==
Professional record breakdown
52 matches	24 wins	26 losses
By knockout	13	5
By submission	4	14
By decision	7	7
Draws	2	

Res.	Record	Opponent	Method	Event	Date	Round	Time	Location	Notes
Loss	24–26–2	Zebaztian Kadestam	TKO (leg kicks)	PXC: Pacific Xtreme Combat 35	February 16, 2013	1	N/A	Pasig, Philippines	Welterweight bout.
Loss	24–25–2	Dave Courchaine	Submission (rear-naked choke)	Destiny MMA: Na Koa 2	January 19, 2013	1	3:52	Honolulu, Hawaii, United States	
Loss	24–24–2	A Sol Kwon	Submission (rear-naked choke)	HEAT 16	November 6, 2010	2	4:43	Osaka, Japan	
Win	24–23–2	Yoshitaro Niimi	Decision (unanimous)	HEAT 15	September 20, 2010	3	5:00	Nagoya, Japan	
Win	23–23–2	Michael Winkelspecht	Submission (rear-naked choke)	X-1 vs. Destiny MMA: Showdown in Waipahu 3	August 7, 2010	2	4:06	Honolulu, Hawaii, United States	Won the X-1 Middleweight Championship.
Loss	22–23–2	Dylan Clay	TKO (corner stoppage)	X-1: Legends	May 16, 2008	1	5:00	Honolulu, Hawaii, United States	
Loss	22–22–2	James Fanshier	Submission (armbar)	KOTC: No Holds Barred	July 14, 2007	3	0:43	Porterville, California, United States	
Loss	22–21–2	Jeremiah Metcalf	Submission (rear-naked choke)	Gladiator Challenge 63	May 11, 2007	4	1:44	Tahoe, California, United States	
Loss	22–20–2	Eugene Jackson	Submission (rear-naked choke)	Strikeforce: Triple Threat	December 8, 2006	1	2:01	San Jose, California, United States	For the vacant Strikeforce U.S. Middleweight Championship.
Loss	22–19–2	Akira Kikuchi	Submission (armlock)	Shooto: Champion Carnival	October 14, 2006	1	1:58	Yokohama, Japan	
Loss	22–18–2	Keita Nakamura	Technical Submission (rear-naked choke)	Punishment in Paradise: East vs. West	July 21, 2006	1	3:55	Honolulu, Hawaii, United States	For the Shooto Pacific Rim Middleweight (167 lb) Championship.
Loss	22–17–2	Antonio McKee	Decision (split)	Extreme Wars 3	June 3, 2006	3	5:00	Oakland, California, United States	
Loss	22–16–2	Frank Trigg	Decision (unanimous)	Rumble on the Rock 8	January 20, 2006	3	5:00	Honolulu, Hawaii, United States	
Loss	22–15–2	Thales Leites	TKO (doctor stoppage)	Rumble on the Rock: Qualifiers	September 17, 2005	3	0:32	Honolulu, Hawaii, United States	
Loss	22–14–2	Jay Hieron	TKO (cut)	Lockdown in Paradise 1	March 19, 2005	1	4:34	Lahaina, Hawaii, United States	
Win	22–13–2	Shigetoshi Iwase	Decision (unanimous)	Punishment in Paradise 9	January 22, 2005	3	5:00	Hawaii, United States	
Loss	21–13–2	Jason Miller	Technical Submission (arm-triangle choke)	SuperBrawl 37	October 16, 2004	2	N/A	Kapolei, Hawaii, United States	For the vacant SuperBrawl Welterweight Championship.
Loss	21–12–2	Chris Lytle	Submission (guillotine choke)	UFC 49	August 21, 2004	2	1:17	Las Vegas, Nevada, United States	
Win	21–11–2	Ryan Schultz	TKO (corner stoppage)	Rumble on the Rock 5	May 7, 2004	2	5:00	Honolulu, Hawaii, United States	
Win	20–11–2	Kyle Brees	TKO	SuperBrawl 33	February 7, 2004	3	4:40	Honolulu, Hawaii, United States	
Win	19–11–2	Andrew Chappelle	Decision (unanimous)	Ring of Honor 3	January 24, 2004	3	5:00	ʻEwa Beach, Hawaii, United States	
Win	18–11–2	Sean Taylor	TKO (corner stoppage)	Rumble on the Rock 4	October 10, 2003	2	3:05	Honolulu, Hawaii, United States	
Loss	17–11–2	Tiki Ghosn	Decision (split)	SuperBrawl 31	September 20, 2003	3	5:00	Honolulu, Hawaii, United States	
Loss	17–10–2	John Alessio	Decision (unanimous)	KOTC 29: Renegades	September 5, 2003	5	5:00	San Jacinto, California, United States	Lost the KOTC Welterweight Championship.
Win	17–9–2	Shonie Carter	Decision (unanimous)	KOTC 23: Sin City	May 16, 2003	5	5:00	Las Vegas, Nevada, United States	Won the vacant KOTC Welterweight Championship.
Win	16–9–2	James Meals	TKO (submission to strikes)	Kaos Fighting Championships 2	April 26, 2003	N/A	N/A	Honolulu, Hawaii, United States	
Win	15–9–2	Mike Penalber	Decision (unanimous)	SuperBrawl 28	February 8, 2003	3	5:00	Honolulu, Hawaii, United States	
Draw	14–9–2	Dennis Hallman	Draw	KOTC 19: Street Fighter	December 7, 2002	2	5:00	San Jacinto, California, United States	
Draw	14–9–1	Shonie Carter	Draw	SuperBrawl 27	November 9, 2002	3	5:00	Honolulu, Hawaii, United States	
Loss	14–9	Stephan Potvin	Submission (toe hold)	UCC Hawaii	September 17, 2002	3	3:18	Honolulu, Hawaii, United States	
Loss	14–8	Masanori Suda	Decision (majority)	Shooto: Treasure Hunt 7	June 29, 2002	3	5:00	Osaka, Japan	
Loss	14–7	Izuru Takeuchi	Decision (majority)	Shooto: Treasure Hunt 1	January 12, 2002	3	5:00	Tokyo, Japan	
Win	14–6	Shannon Ritch	TKO (punches)	Warriors Quest 3	December 1, 2001	1	2:17	Honolulu, Hawaii, United States	
Loss	13–6	Jermaine Andre	TKO (punches)	World Fighting Alliance 1	November 3, 2001	1	3:11	Las Vegas, Nevada, United States	
Win	13–5	Pete Spratt	KO (knee)	Warriors Quest 2	August 1, 2001	3	4:36	Hawaii, United States	
Win	12–5	Joe Stevenson	Decision (unanimous)	Warriors Quest 1	May 29, 2001	3	5:00	Honolulu, Hawaii, United States	Won the vacant Warriors Quest Middleweight Championship.
Win	11–5	Dave Strasser	Submission (armbar)	SuperBrawl 21	May 24, 2001	2	4:42	Honolulu, Hawaii, United States	
Win	10–5	Brian Sleeman	Submission (armbar)	KOTC 8: Bombs Away	April 29, 2001	2	2:03	Williams, California, United States	
Win	9–5	J.T. Taylor	TKO (knees)	Hawaii Combat 2	March 1, 2001	2	0:33	Waipahu, Hawaii, United States	
Win	8–5	Jordon Klimp	TKO (punches)	IFC: Warriors Challenge 11	January 13, 2001	1	3:07	Fresno, California, United States	
Win	7–5	Jason Von Flue	TKO (punches)	IFC: Warriors Challenge 10	October 11, 2000	1	N/A	Friant, California, United States	
Loss	6–5	Erik Paulson	Decision (unanimous)	SuperBrawl 17	April 15, 2000	3	5:00	Honolulu, Hawaii, United States	
Win	6–4	Kim Mason	TKO (punches)	SuperBrawl 16	February 8, 2000	2	3:44	Honolulu, Hawaii, United States	
Loss	5–4	Yuki Sasaki	Submission (triangle armbar)	Shooto: R.E.A.D. 1	January 14, 2000	3	2:20	Tokyo, Japan	
Win	5–3	Deshon Dungey	Submission (rear-naked choke)	SuperBrawl 15	December 7, 1999	1	4:21	Honolulu, Hawaii, United States	
Win	4–3	John Chrisostomo	TKO (cut)	SuperBrawl 14	November 5, 1999	1	1:15	Guam	
Win	3–3	Skip McNeil	TKO (punches)	SuperBrawl 14	November 5, 1999	1	0:14	Guam	
Loss	2–3	Marcos da Silva	Submission (rear-naked choke)	SuperBrawl 13	September 7, 1999	1	2:19	Hawaii, United States	
Win	2–2	James Zikic	Decision (majority)	SuperBrawl 12	June 1, 1999	3	5:00	Hawaii, United States	
Loss	1–2	James Zikic	Submission (rear-naked choke)	SuperBrawl 11	February 2, 1999	1	3:40	Hawaii, United States	
Win	1–1	Paul Cutts	TKO (punches)	SuperBrawl 11	February 2, 1999	1	0:15	Hawaii, United States	
Loss	0–1	Eugene Jackson	Technical Submission (forearm choke)	SuperBrawl 8	August 4, 1998	1	1:17	Hawaii, United States	
