= Luke Stewart (fighter) =

American mixed martial arts fighter

- Born: San Francisco, California, United States
- Nationality: American
- Height: 5 ft 11 in (1.80 m)
- Weight: 170 lb (77 kg; 12 st)
- Division: Welterweight
- Fighting out of: San Francisco, California, United States
- Rank: Black belt in Brazilian jiu-jitsu under Ralph Gracie
- Years active: 2006–2010

Mixed martial arts record
- Total: 9
- Wins: 6
- By knockout: 3
- By submission: 3
- Losses: 3
- By knockout: 1
- By decision: 2

Other information
- Mixed martial arts record from Sherdog

Luke Stewart is a retired American mixed martial artist. Holding a professional record of 6–3, Stewart competed in the now-defunct promotion Strikeforce for his entire career.

== Background ==
Luke Stewart has trained and competed in Brazilian jiu-jitsu for several years, and is a black belt under Ralph Gracie, in San Francisco, California.

== Mixed martial arts career ==
=== Strikeforce (2006–2010) ===
Stewart made his professional mixed martial arts debut in 2006, signing with now-defunct promotion Strikeforce in May 2006. He made his debut facing Bill Duvall at Strikeforce: Revenge on June 9, 2006. He won the fight via armbar submission, 1:15 into the first round.

In his second fight with the promotion, Stewart faced Jeremiah Metcalf at Strikeforce: Tank vs. Buentello on October 7, 2006. He won the fight via rear-naked choke. He then faced UFC veteran Jason Von Flue at Strikeforce: Shamrock vs. Baroni on June 22, 2007. He won the fight via third round TKO.

Stewart faced Sam Liera at Strikeforce: Playboy Mansion on September 29, 2007. He won the fight via first round TKO. In his fifth fight with the promotion, Stewart faced Bryson Kamaka at Strikeforce: Four Men Enter, One Man Survives on November 16, 2007. He won the fight via knockout, just 19 seconds into the first round.

In his next fight, he faced Tiki Ghosn at Strikeforce: Shamrock vs. Le on March 29, 2008. Despite being a considerable betting favorite coming into the bout, Stewart lost the fight via unanimous decision, the first loss of his professional MMA career.

Stewart faced Jesse Juarez at Strikeforce: At The Mansion II on September 20, 2008. He won the fight via first round armbar. Joe Riggs at Strikeforce: Destruction on November 21, 2008. He lost the fight via second round TKO.

After a one-year hiatus from MMA, Stewart returned to face André Galvão at Strikeforce Challengers: Johnson vs. Mahe on March 26, 2010. He lost the fight via split decision, and subsequently retired from mixed martial arts shortly after.

== Personal life ==
Stewart is the owner of his own Tattoo shop, Seventh Son Tattoo, in San Francisco, California.

== Mixed martial arts record ==
Professional record breakdown
9 matches	6 wins	3 losses
By knockout	3	1
By submission	3	0
By decision	0	2

Res.	Record	Opponent	Method	Event	Date	Round	Time	Location	Notes
Loss	6–3	André Galvão	Decision (split)	Strikeforce Challengers: Johnson vs. Mahe	March 26, 2010	3	5:00	San Jose, California, United States	
Loss	6–2	Joe Riggs	TKO (punches)	Strikeforce: Destruction	November 21, 2008	2	2:05	San Jose, California, United States	
Win	6–1	Jesse Juarez	Submission (armbar)	Strikeforce: At The Mansion II	September 20, 2008	1	4:55	Beverly Hills, California, United States	
Loss	5–1	Tiki Ghosn	Decision (unanimous)	Strikeforce: Shamrock vs. Le	March 29, 2008	3	5:00	San Jose, California, United States	
Win	5–0	Bryson Kamaka	KO (knee)	Strikeforce: Four Men Enter, One Man Survives	November 16, 2007	1	0:19	San Jose, California, United States	
Win	4–0	Sam Liera	TKO (punches)	Strikeforce: Playboy Mansion	September 29, 2007	1	3:40	Beverly Hills, California, United States	
Win	3–0	Jason Von Flue	TKO (punches)	Strikeforce: Shamrock vs. Baroni	June 22, 2007	3	2:17	San Jose, California, United States	
Win	2–0	Jeremiah Metcalf	Submission (rear-naked choke)	Strikeforce: Tank vs. Buentello	October 7, 2006	1	2:19	Fresno, California, United States	
Win	1–0	Bill Duvall	Submission (armbar)	Strikeforce: Revenge	June 9, 2006	1	1:15	San Jose, California, United States	
