= 2009 in Strikeforce =

Mixed martial arts events

Information
- First date: April 11, 2009
- Last date: December 19, 2009

Events
- Total events: 10

Fights
- Total fights: 97
- Title fights: 6

Chronology
2008 in Strikeforce	2009 in Strikeforce	2010 in Strikeforce

The year 2009 was the 4th year in the history of Strikeforce, a mixed martial arts promotion based in the United States. In 2009 Strikeforce held 10 events beginning with, Strikeforce: Shamrock vs. Diaz.

== Title fights ==
Title fights in 2009
Weight class				Method	Round	Time	Event	Notes
Lightweight	Gilbert Melendez	def.	Rodrigo Damm	KO (Punches)	2	2:02	Strikeforce: Shamrock vs. Diaz	(Note: For the Interim Lightweight Championship.)
Women's Featherweight	Cristiane Justino	def.	Gina Carano	KO (punches)	1	4:59	Strikeforce: Carano vs. Cyborg	(Note: For the Women's Featherweight Championship.)
Light Heavyweight	Gegard Mousasi	def.	Renato Sobral (c)	KO (punches)	1	1:00	Strikeforce: Carano vs. Cyborg	(Note: For the Light Heavyweight Championship.)
Lightweight	Gilbert Melendez (ic)	def.	Mitsuhiro Ishida	TKO (punches)	3	3:56	Strikeforce: Carano vs. Cyborg	(Note: For the Interim Lightweight Championship.)
Middleweight	Jake Shields	def.	Jason Miller	unanimous decision (49-46, 49-46, 48-47)	5	5:00	Strikeforce: Fedor vs. Rogers	(Note: For the Middleweight Championship.)
Lightweight	Gilbert Melendez (ic)	def.	Josh Thomson	Decision (Unanimous)	5	5:00	Strikeforce: Evolution	(Note: For the Lightweight Championship.)

== Events list ==
#	Event Title	Date	Arena	Location	Attendance	Broadcast
26	Strikeforce: Evolution	December 19, 2009	HP Pavilion at San Jose	San Jose, California	14,749	Showtime
25	Strikeforce Challengers 5: Woodley vs. Bears	November 20, 2009	Memorial Hall	Kansas City, Kansas	2,088	Showtime
24	Strikeforce: Fedor vs. Rogers	November 7, 2009	Sears Centre	Hoffman Estates, Illinois	11,512	CBS
23	Strikeforce Challengers 4: Gurgel vs. Evangelista	November 6, 2009	Save Mart Center	Fresno, California	4,157	Showtime
22	Strikeforce Challengers 3: Kennedy vs. Cummings	September 25, 2009	SpiritBank Event Center	Bixby, Oklahoma	2,336	Showtime
21	Strikeforce: Carano vs. Cyborg	August 15, 2009	HP Pavilion at San Jose	San Jose, California	13,976	Showtime
20	Strikeforce Challengers 2: Villasenor vs. Cyborg	June 19, 2009	ShoWare Center	Kent, Washington	2,836	Showtime
19	Strikeforce: Lawler vs. Shields	June 6, 2009	Scottrade Center	St. Louis, Missouri	8,867	Showtime
18	Strikeforce Challengers 1: Evangelista vs. Aina	May 15, 2009	Save Mart Center	Fresno, California	2,322	Showtime
17	Strikeforce: Shamrock vs. Diaz	April 11, 2009	HP Pavilion at San Jose	San Jose, California	15,211	Showtime

== Strikeforce: Shamrock vs. Diaz ==
Strikeforce: Shamrock vs. Diaz was an event held on April 11, 2009 at the HP Pavilion at San Jose in San Jose, California.

=== Results ===
Main Card
Weight class				Method	Round	Time	Notes
Lightweight	Gilbert Melendez	def.	Rodrigo Damm	KO (Punches)	2	2:02	(Note: For the Interim Lightweight Championship.)
Catchweight (179 lb)	Nick Diaz	def.	Frank Shamrock	TKO (Punches)	2	3:57
Middleweight	Scott Smith	def.	Benji Radach	KO (Punch)	3	3:24
Women's Featherweight	Cristiane Justino	def.	Hitomi Akano	TKO (Punches)	3	0:35
Heavyweight	Brett Rogers	def.	Ron Humphrey	TKO (Knees)	2	1:38
Preliminary Card
Middleweight	Luke Rockhold	def.	Buck Meredith	Submission (Rear-Naked Choke)	1	4:07
Middleweight	Eric Lawson	def.	Waylon Kennell	TKO (Punches)	1	4:54
Catchweight (187.5 lb)	Raul Castillo	def.	Brandon Michaels	Submission (Rear-Naked Choke)	1	1:45
Welterweight	James Terry	def.	Zak Bucia	Decision (Unanimous)	3	5:00
Bantamweight	Shingo Kohara	def.	Jeremy Tavares	KO (Knee)	2	0:04

== Strikeforce Challengers 1: Evangelista vs. Aina ==
Strikeforce Challengers 1: Evangelista vs. Aina
- Promotion: Strikeforce
- Date: May 15, 2009
- Venue: Save Mart Center
- City: Fresno, California
- Attendance: 2,322

Event chronology
Strikeforce: Shamrock vs. Diaz	Strikeforce Challengers 1: Evangelista vs. Aina	Strikeforce: Lawler vs. Shields

Strikeforce Challengers 1: Evangelista vs. Aina was an event held on May 15, 2009 at the Save Mart Center in Fresno, California.

=== Results ===
Main Card
Weight class				Method	Round	Time	Notes
Lightweight	Mike Aina	def.	Billy Evangelista	No Decision (Overturned by CSAC)	2	3:42
Women's Bantamweight	Sarah Kaufman	def.	Miesha Tate	Decision (Unanimous)	3	3:00
Heavyweight	Lavar Johnson	def.	Carl Seumanutafa	KO (Punch)	1	0:18
Light Heavyweight	Aaron Rosa	def.	Anthony Ruiz	Technical Submission (Rear-Naked Choke)	1	4:29
Featherweight	Bao Quach	def.	Tito Jones	Decision (Unanimous)	3	5:00
Preliminary Card
	Spencer Herns	def.	Chad Sutton	Decision (Majority)	3	3:00
	Fabricio Camoes	def.	Torrance Taylor	Submission (Rear-Naked Choke)	1	3:21
	Thomas Diagne	def.	Kaleo Kwan	Decision (Unanimous)	3	5:00
	Ben Holscher	def.	Cody Canterbury	Submission (Rear-Naked Choke)	1	2:47

== Strikeforce: Lawler vs. Shields ==
Strikeforce: Lawler vs. Shields was an event held on June 6, 2009 at the Scottrade Center in St. Louis, Missouri.

=== Results ===
Main Card
Weight class				Method	Round	Time	Notes
Catchweight (182 lb)	Jake Shields	def.	Robbie Lawler	submission (guillotine choke)	1	2:02
Heavyweight	Brett Rogers	def.	Andrei Arlovski	TKO (punches)	1	0:22
Catchweight (180 lb)	Nick Diaz	def.	Scott Smith	submission (rear-naked choke)	3	1:41
Welterweight	Joe Riggs	def.	Phil Baroni	unanimous decision (30–27, 30–27, 30–27)	3	5:00
Light Heavyweight	Mike Kyle	def.	Rafael Cavalcante	KO (punches)	2	4:05
Preliminary Card
Light Heavyweight	Mike Whitehead	def.	Kevin Randleman	unanimous decision (29–28, 29–28, 29–28)	3	5:00
Catchweight (175 lb)	Jesse Finney	def.	Josh Bumgarner	submission (kimura)	1	1:55
Middleweight	Lucas Lopes	def.	Scott Ventimiglia	disqualification (illegal knee)	1	3:26
Welterweight	Tyron Woodley	def.	Sal Woods	submission (arm triangle choke)	1	4:20
Light Heavyweight	Booker DeRousse	def.	James Wade	TKO (punches)	1	4:06
Lightweight	Pat Benson	def.	Dave Cochran	submission (armbar)	1	2:42

== Strikeforce Challengers 2: Villasenor vs. Cyborg ==
Strikeforce Challengers 2: Villasenor vs. Cyborg
- Promotion: Strikeforce
- Date: June 19, 2009
- Venue: ShoWare Center
- City: Kent, Washington
- Attendance: 2,836

Event chronology
Strikeforce: Lawler vs. Shields	Strikeforce Challengers 2: Villasenor vs. Cyborg	Strikeforce: Carano vs. Cyborg

Strikeforce Challengers 2: Villasenor vs. Cyborg was an event held on June 19, 2009 at the ShoWare Center in Kent, Washington.

=== Results ===
Main Card
Weight class				Method	Round	Time	Notes
Middleweight	Joey Villasenor	def.	Evangelista Santos	Decision (Split)	3	5:00
Middleweight	Tim Kennedy	def.	Nick Thompson	TKO (Submission to punches)	2	2:37
Catchweight (160 lb)	Jorge Gurgel	def.	Conor Heun	Decision (Unanimous)	3	5:00
Women's Bantamweight	Sarah Kaufman	def.	Shayna Baszler	Decision (Unanimous)	3	5:00
Middleweight	Luke Rockhold	def.	Cory Devela	Submission (Rear-Naked Choke)	1	0:30
Preliminary Card
	Dennis Hallman	def.	Justin Davis	Submission (Rear-Naked Choke)	1	0:20
	Bryan Caraway	def.	Alex Zuniga	Decision (Unanimous)	3	5:00
	Lyle Beerbohm	def.	Duane Ludwig	Submission (Bulldog Choke)	1	4:27
	Landon Showalter	def.	George Stork	Decision (Unanimous)	3	5:00
	Len Bentley	def.	Marques Daniels	Decision (Unanimous)	3	5:00
	Steve Hadsel	def.	Taylor Roberts	KO (Punches)	1	0:17

== Strikeforce: Carano vs. Cyborg ==
Strikeforce: Carano vs. Cyborg was an event held on August 15, 2009 at the HP Pavilion at San Jose in San Jose, California.

=== Results ===
Main card
Weight class				Method	Round	Time	Notes
Women's Featherweight	Cristiane Justino	def.	Gina Carano	KO (punches)	1	4:59	(Note: For the Women's Featherweight Championship.)
Light Heavyweight	Gegard Mousasi	def.	Renato Sobral (c)	KO (punches)	1	1:00	(Note: For the Light Heavyweight Championship.)
Lightweight	Gilbert Melendez (ic)	def.	Mitsuhiro Ishida	TKO (punches)	3	3:56	(Note: For the Interim Lightweight Championship.)
Heavyweight	Fabrício Werdum	def.	Mike Kyle	Submission (guillotine choke)	1	1:24
Preliminary card
Welterweight	Jay Hieron	def.	Jesse Taylor	Decision (unanimous) (30–27, 30–27, 30–27)	3	5:00
Lightweight	Justin Wilcox	def.	David Douglas	Submission (rear-naked choke)	3	3:16
Lightweight	Alexander Trevino	def.	Isaiah Hill	Submission (keylock)	1	3:56
Welterweight	James Terry	def.	Zak Bucia	TKO (head kick and punches)	1	1:23
Light Heavyweight	Scott Lighty	def.	Mike Cook	TKO (punch to the body)	1	2:05

== Strikeforce Challengers 3: Kennedy vs. Cummings ==
Strikeforce Challengers 3: Kennedy vs. Cummings
- Promotion: Strikeforce
- Date: September 25, 2009
- Venue: SpiritBank Event Center
- City: Bixby, Oklahoma
- Attendance: 2,336

Event chronology
Strikeforce: Carano vs. Cyborg	Strikeforce Challengers 3: Kennedy vs. Cummings	Strikeforce Challengers 4: Gurgel vs. Evangelista

Strikeforce Challengers 3: Kennedy vs. Cummings was an event held on September 25, 2009 at the SpiritBank Event Center in Bixby, Oklahoma.

=== Results ===
Main Card
Weight class				Method	Round	Time	Notes
Middleweight	Tim Kennedy	def.	Zak Cummings	Submission (North-South Choke)	2	2:43
Heavyweight	Ray Sefo	def.	Kevin Jordan	TKO (Knee Injury)	2	0:24
Welterweight	Tyron Woodley	def.	Zach Light	Submission (Armbar)	2	3:38
Catchweight (147 lb)	Thomas Longacre	def.	Travis Calanoc	Decision (Unanimous)	3	5:00
Heavyweight	Daniel Cormier	def.	Gary Frazier	TKO (Punches)	2	3:39
Preliminary Card
	Jeri Sitzes	def.	Lacey Schuckman	TKO (Punches)	3	2:18
	Paul Bradley	def.	Levi Avera	Decision (Unanimous)	3	5:00
	Trey Houston	def.	Brandon Gaines	Submission (Arm-Triangle Choke)	2	1:28
	Kenny Giddens	def.	Jonny Carson	Submission (D'arce Choke)	2	4:15
	Josh Pulsifer	def.	Nick Gibbons	Submission (D'arce Choke)	1	1:05
	Dylan Smith	def.	Lemont Davis	Submission (Rear-Naked Choke)	1	1:15

== Strikeforce Challengers 4: Gurgel vs. Evangelista ==
Strikeforce Challengers 4: Gurgel vs. Evangelista
- Promotion: Strikeforce
- Date: November 6, 2009
- Venue: Save Mart Center
- City: Fresno, California
- Attendance: 4,157

Event chronology
Strikeforce Challengers 3: Kennedy vs. Cummings	Strikeforce Challengers 4: Gurgel vs. Evangelista	Strikeforce: Fedor vs. Rogers

Strikeforce Challengers 4: Gurgel vs. Evangelista was an event held on November 6, 2009 at the Save Mart Center in Fresno, California.

=== Results ===
Main Card
Weight class				Method	Round	Time	Notes
Catchweight (160 lb)	Billy Evangelista	def.	Jorge Gurgel	Decision (Unanimous)	3	5:00
Heavyweight	Shane del Rosario	def.	Brandon Cash	Submission (Omoplata)	1	2:57
Middleweight	Luke Rockhold	def.	Jesse Taylor	Submission (Rear-Naked Choke)	1	3:42
Lightweight	Merritt Warren	def.	Thomas Diagne	Submission (Inverted Heel Hook)	1	3:49
Women's Bantamweight	Zoila Frausto	def.	Elisha Helsper	Decision (Unanimous)	3	5:00
Preliminary Card
	Ben Holscher	def.	Jonny Goh	Decision (Unanimous)	3	5:00
	Casey Olson	def.	Chris Culley	TKO (Punches)	1	2:32
	Cole Escovedo	def.	Maurice Eazel	TKO (Punches)	1	1:47
	Rico Altamirano	def.	Alexander Trevino	Decision (Unanimous)	3	5:00

== Strikeforce: Fedor vs. Rogers ==
Strikeforce: Fedor vs. Rogers was an event held on November 7, 2009 at the Sears Centre in Hoffman Estates, Illinois.

=== Results ===
Main card
Weight class				Method	Round	Time	Notes
Heavyweight	Fedor Emelianenko	def.	Brett Rogers	KO (punch)	2	1:48
Middleweight	Jake Shields	def.	Jason Miller	unanimous decision (49–46, 49–46, 48–47)	5	5:00	(Note: For the Middleweight Championship.)
Light Heavyweight	Gegard Mousasi	def.	Rameau Thierry Sokoudjou	TKO (punches)	2	3:43
Heavyweight	Fabrício Werdum	def.	Antônio Silva	unanimous decision (29–28, 29–28, 29–28)	3	5:00
Preliminary card
Women's Featherweight	Marloes Coenen	def.	Roxanne Modafferi	submission (armbar)	1	1:05
Catchweight (150 lb)	Jeff Curran	def.	Dustin Neace	verbal submission (rib injury)	1	1:39
Middleweight	Nate Moore	def.	Louis Taylor	submission (punches)	2	3:24
Middleweight	Shamar Bailey	def.	John Kolosci	unanimous decision (29–27, 29–27, 29–27)	3	5:00	(Note: Bailey was docked one point in round two for holding the shorts of Kolosci.)
Welterweight	Christian Uflacker	def.	Jonatas Novaes	unanimous decision (30–25, 30–25, 29–26)	3	5:00	(Note: Novaes was docked two points in round three for two illegal kicks to the head of a downed opponent.)

== Strikeforce Challengers 5: Woodley vs. Bears ==
Strikeforce Challengers 5: Woodley vs. Bears
- Promotion: Strikeforce
- Date: November 20, 2009
- Venue: Memorial Hall
- City: Kansas City, Kansas
- Attendance: 2,088

Event chronology
Strikeforce: Fedor vs. Rogers	Strikeforce Challengers 5: Woodley vs. Bears	Strikeforce: Evolution

Strikeforce Challengers 5: Woodley vs. Bears was an event held on November 20, 2009 at the Memorial Hall in Kansas City, Kansas.

=== Results ===
Main Card
Weight class				Method	Round	Time	Notes
Welterweight	Tyron Woodley	def.	Rudy Bears	Submission (Arm-Triangle Choke)	1	2:52
Women's	Kerry Vera	def.	Kim Couture	TKO (Punches)	1	3:35
Welterweight	Bobby Voelker	def.	Erik Apple	TKO (Punches)	2	1:23
Light Heavyweight	Rafael Cavalcante	def.	Aaron Rosa	TKO (Punches)	2	3:25
Middleweight	Kevin Casey	def.	Chad Vance	Submission (Rear-Naked Choke)	1	1:41
Preliminary card
	Lee Gibson	def.	Joe Wilk	TKO (Punches)	1	4:39
	Brian Davidson	def.	Russell Patrick	TKO (Punches)	1	0:29
	Nick Nolte	def.	Andy Waters	Submission (Triangle Choke)	1	3:45
	Darryl Cobb	def.	Gary Tapusoa	Decision (Split)	3	5:00
	Michael Chandler	def.	Richard Bouphanouvong	TKO (Punches)	2	2:07
	Lucas Lopes	def.	Dominic Brown	TKO (Punches)	2	0:45

== Strikeforce: Evolution ==
Strikeforce: Evolution was an event held on December 19, 2009 at the HP Pavilion at San Jose in San Jose, California.

=== Results ===
Main Card
Weight class				Method	Round	Time	Notes
Middleweight	Scott Smith	def.	Cung Le	KO (Punches)	3	3:25
Lightweight	Gilbert Melendez (ic)	def.	Josh Thomson	Decision (Unanimous)	5	5:00	(Note: For the Lightweight Championship.)
Middleweight	Ronaldo Souza	def.	Matt Lindland	Submission (Arm-Triangle Choke)	1	4:18
Heavyweight	Muhammed Lawal	def.	Mike Whitehead	KO (Punches)	1	3:08
Preliminary Card
Light Heavyweight	Antwain Britt	def.	Scott Lighty	TKO (Doctor Stoppage)	1	5:00
Lightweight	Justin Wilcox	def.	Daisuke Nakamura	Decision (Unanimous)	3	5:00
Featherweight	Alexander Crispim	def.	A.J. Fonseca	Decision (Unanimous)	3	5:00

== See also ==
- List of Strikeforce champions
- List of Strikeforce events
