= 2008 in Strikeforce =

Mixed martial arts events

Information
- First date: February 1, 2008
- Last date: November 21, 2008

Events
- Total events: 8

Fights
- Total fights: 78
- Title fights: 5

Chronology
2007 in Strikeforce	2008 in Strikeforce	2009 in Strikeforce

The year 2008 was the third year in the history of Strikeforce, a mixed martial arts promotion based in the United States. In 2008 Strikeforce held eight events, beginning with Strikeforce: Young Guns II.

== Title fights ==
Title fights in 2008
Weight class				Method	Round	Time	Event	Notes
Middleweight	Cung Le	def.	Frank Shamrock (c)	TKO (stoppage)	3	5:00	Strikeforce: Shamrock vs. Le	(Note: For the Middleweight Championship.)
Lightweight	Gilbert Melendez (c)	def.	Gabe Lemley	TKO (punches)	2	2:18	Strikeforce: Shamrock vs. Le	(Note: For the Lightweight Championship.)
Lightweight	Josh Thomson	def.	Gilbert Melendez (c)	unanimous decision	5	5:00	Strikeforce: Melendez vs. Thomson	(Note: For the Strikeforce Lightweight Championship.)
Heavyweight	Bobby Southworth (c)	def.	Anthony Ruiz	unanimous decision	5	5:00	Strikeforce: Melendez vs. Thomson	(Note: For the Strikeforce Light Heavyweight Championship.)
Light Heavyweight	Renato Sobral	def.	Bobby Southworth (c)	TKO (doctor stoppage)	1	5:00	Strikeforce: Destruction	(Note: For the Light Heavyweight Championship.)

== Events list ==
#	Event Title	Date	Arena	Location	Attendance	Broadcast
16	Strikeforce: Destruction	November 21, 2008	HP Pavilion at San Jose	San Jose, California	8,152	HDNet
15	Strikeforce: Payback	October 3, 2008	Broomfield Events Center	Broomfield, Colorado	3,286	HDNet
14	Strikeforce: At The Mansion II	September 20, 2008	The Playboy Mansion	Beverly Hills, California	2,478	The Score
13	Strikeforce: Young Guns III	September 13, 2008	San Jose Civic Auditorium	San Jose, California	4,789	
12	Strikeforce: Melendez vs. Thomson	June 27, 2008	HP Pavilion at San Jose	San Jose, California	7,288	HDNet
11	Strikeforce: Shamrock vs. Le	March 29, 2008	HP Pavilion at San Jose	San Jose, California	16,326	Showtime
10	Strikeforce: At The Dome	February 23, 2008	Tacoma Dome	Tacoma, Washington	7,089	HDNet
9	Strikeforce: Young Guns II	February 1, 2008	San Jose Civic Auditorium	San Jose, California	5,789	

== Strikeforce: Young Guns II ==
Strikeforce: Young Guns II was an event held on February 1, 2008 at the San Jose Civic Auditorium in San Jose, California.

=== Results ===
Main card
Weight class				Method	Round	Time	Notes
Middleweight	Luke Rockhold	def	Josh Neal	KO (punches)	1	1:49
Featherweight	Darren Uyenoyama	def	Andrew Valladerez	submission (rear-naked choke)	1	0:59
Lightweight	Joey Armstrong	def	Sam Spengler	TKO (punches)	1	2:56
Welterweight	Jesse Jones	def	Anthony Alves	KO (punch)	1	2:01
Preliminary card
Featherweight	Alvin Cacdac	def	Evan Esguerra	submission (guillotine choke)	2	2:13
Middleweight	Issac de Jesus	def	Bobby Stack	submission (guillotine choke)	2	2:52
Heavyweight	Eric Magana	def	Luke Hartwig	TKO (doctor stoppage) in round 2	3	5:00
Lightweight	Adam Antolin	def	Hugo Govea	submission (rear-naked choke)	1	1:31
Welterweight	Jesse Gillespie	def	Dave Martin	unanimous decision	3	5:00

== Strikeforce: At The Dome ==
Strikeforce: At The Dome was an event held on February 23, 2008 at the San Jose Civic Auditorium in San Jose, California.

=== Results ===
Main card
Weight class				Method	Round	Time	Notes
Heavyweight	Jan Nortje	def	Bob Sapp	TKO (punches)	1	0:55
Lightweight	Jorge Masvidal	def	Ryan Healy	unanimous decision	3	5:00
Middleweight	Cory Devela	def	Joe Riggs	submission (slam)	1	1:22
Heavyweight	Maurice Smith	def	Rick Roufus	submission (kimura)	1	1:53
Preliminary card
Welterweight	Eddy Ellis	def	Steve Berger	unanimous decision	3	5:00
Heavyweight	Mychal Clark	def	Josh Bennett	TKO (swollen eye)	2	5:00
Welterweight	Lyle Beerbohm	def	Ray Perales	submission (guillotine choke)	3	1:19
Heavyweight	Mike Hayes	def	Matt Kovacs	unanimous decision	3	5:00
Featherweight	Zack Skinner	def	Scott Shaffer	unanimous decision	3	5:00
Welterweight	Nathan Coy	def	Dave Courchaine	KO (punch)	1	1:46

== Strikeforce: Shamrock vs. Le ==
Strikeforce: Shamrock vs. Le was an event held on March 29, 2008 at the San Jose Civic Auditorium in San Jose, California.

=== Results ===
Main card
Weight class				Method	Round	Time	Notes
Middleweight	Cung Le	def.	Frank Shamrock (c)	TKO (stoppage)	3	5:00	(Note: For the Middleweight Championship.)
Lightweight	Gilbert Melendez (c)	def.	Gabe Lemley	TKO (punches)	2	2:18	(Note: For the Lightweight Championship.)
Heavyweight	Wayne Cole	def.	Mike Kyle	Submission (armbar)	1	0:45
Middleweight	Joey Villasenor	def.	Ryan Jensen	KO (punch)	1	4:45
Preliminary card
Catchweight (162 lb)	Billy Evangelista	def.	Marlon Sims	KO (punch)	3	0:39
Welterweight	Drew Fickett	def.	Jae Suk Lim	Submission (guillotine choke)	1	1:14
Welterweight	Tiki Ghosn	def.	Luke Stewart	Decision (unanimous) (29-28, 29-28, 30-27)	3	5:00
Bantamweight	Darren Uyenoyama	def.	Anthony Figueroa	Submission (guillotine choke)	1	1:27
Catchweight (180 lb)	Jesse Jones	def.	Jesse Gillespie	TKO (punches)	1	0:35

== Strikeforce: Melendez vs. Thomson ==
Strikeforce: Melendez vs. Thomson was an event held on June 27, 2008, at the San Jose Civic Auditorium in San Jose, California.

=== Results ===
Main card
Weight class				Method	Round	Time	Notes
Lightweight	Josh Thomson	def.	Gilbert Melendez (c)	unanimous decision	5	5:00	(Note: For the Strikeforce Lightweight Championship.)
Heavyweight	Bobby Southworth (c)	def.	Anthony Ruiz	unanimous decision	5	5:00	(Note: For the Strikeforce Light Heavyweight Championship.)
Lightweight	Billy Evangelista	def.	Nam Phan	split decision	3	5:00
Middleweight	Eric Lawson	def.	Jesse Gillespie	Submission (rear-naked choke)	1	1:03
Women's Featherweight	Miesha Tate	def.	Elaina Maxwell	unanimous decision	3	5:00
Preliminary card
Middleweight	Jeremiah Metcalf	def.	Raymond Daniels	submission (rear-naked choke)	2	0:59
Bantamweight	Chris Cariaso	def.	Anthony Figueroa	submission (rear-naked choke)	2	4:34
Lightweight	Bobby Stack	def.	Jose Palacios	unanimous decision	3	5:00
Featherweight	Bryan Caraway	def.	Alvin Cacdac	submission (rear-naked choke)	1	1:39
Welterweight	Cyrillo Padilha	def.	Jesse Jones	unanimous decision	3	5:00
Light Heavyweight	Jorge Interiano	def.	Travis Johnson	TKO (doctor stoppage)	2	3:00
Lightweight	Alexander Trevino	def.	Eric Jacob	submission (armbar)	1	0:37

== Strikeforce: Young Guns III ==
Strikeforce: Young Guns III was an event held on September 13, 2008 at the San Jose Civic Auditorium in San Jose, California.

=== Results ===
Main card
Weight class				Method	Round	Time	Notes
Light Heavyweight	Chris Bostick	def	Jorge Interianoaz	submission (armbar)	1	2:26
Heavyweight	Yohan Banks	def	Michael Diaz	KO (punch)	1	0:19
Flyweight	Adam Antolin	def	Javi Alanis	TKO (punches)	2	1:41
Catchweight (140 lb)	Ryan Bastianelli	def	Hussain Rasouli	unanimous decision	3	5:00
Preliminary card
Lightweight	Alexander Trevino	def	Gennaro Strangis	unanimous decision	3	5:00
Lightweight	Matt Pedro	def	Eric Castile	submission (rear-naked choke)	2	1:08
Featherweight	David Rasouri	def	Jeremy Tavares	unanimous decision	3	5:00
Lightweight	Mike Davis	def	O.J. Dominguez	unanimous decision	3	5:00

== Strikeforce: At The Mansion II ==
Strikeforce: At The Mansion II was an event held on September 20, 2008 at the San Jose Civic Auditorium in San Jose, California.

=== Results ===
Main Card
Weight class				Method	Round	Time	Notes
Light Heavyweight	Trevor Prangley	def	Anthony Ruiz	unanimous decision (29–28, 30–27, 30–26)	3	5:00
Lightweight	Mitsuhiro Ishida	def	Justin Wilcox	submission (armbar)	1	1:21
Middleweight	Terry Martin	def	Cory Devela	TKO (strikes)	3	2:08
Lightweight	Josh Thomson	def	Ashe Bowman	TKO (punches)	1	1:14
Middleweight	Kazuo Misaki	def	Joe Riggs	TKO (punches)	2	2:29
Preliminary card
Welterweight	Luke Stewart	def	Jesse Juarez	submission (armbar)	1	4:55
Middleweight	Eric Lawson	def	Kenneth Seegrist	submission (rear-naked choke)	1	3:07
Welterweight	Brandon Magana	def	Brandon Thatch	split decision (29–28, 28–29, 29–28)	3	5:00
Catchweight (195 lb)	Jesse Gillespie	def	Dave Martin	split decision (27–30, 29–28, 29–28)	3	5:00

== Strikeforce: Payback ==
Strikeforce: Payback was an event held on October 3, 2008 at the San Jose Civic Auditorium in San Jose, California.

=== Results ===
Main card
Weight class				Method	Round	Time	Notes
Catchweight (165 lb)	Duane Ludwig	def	Sammy Morgan	TKO (punches)	1	2:01
Middleweight	Frank Trigg	def	Falaniko Vitale	unanimous decision (29–28, 29–28, 30–27)	3	5:00
Welterweight	Donnie Liles	def	Pete Spratt	submission (rear-naked choke)	3	1:59
Lightweight	Billy Evangelista	def	Luke Caudillo	unanimous decision (29–28, 29–28, 30–27)	3	5:00
Light Heavyweight	Carlos Zevallos	def	Andre Walker	TKO (punches)	1	4:49
Preliminary Card
Women's Flyweight	Michelle Waterson	def	Tyra Parker	submission (rear-naked choke)	1	1:20
Featherweight	Tyler Toner	def	Ricky Johnson	TKO (punches)	2	3:44
Welterweight	Drew Dober	def	Lumumba Sayers	KO (punch)	1	0:16
Lightweight	Alan Gomez	def	Jordan Goodwin	unanimous decision	3	5:00
Lightweight	Eric Galvan	def	Jeremy Malaterre	split decision (29–28, 30–27, 28–29)	3	5:00
Catchweight (140 lb)	Turrell Galloway	def	Brett Tillis	submission (rear-naked choke)	1	1:21
Flyweight	Aaron Trujillo	def	Haven Torres	TKO (punches)	1	2:59

== Strikeforce: Destruction ==
Strikeforce: Destruction was an event held on November 21, 2008, at the San Jose Civic Auditorium in San Jose, California.

=== Results ===
Main card
Weight class				Method	Round	Time	Notes
Light Heavyweight	Renato Sobral	def	Bobby Southworth (c)	TKO (doctor stoppage)	1	5:00	(Note: For the Light Heavyweight Championship.)
160 lb. Catchweight	Duane Ludwig	def	Yves Edwards	unanimous decision (29-28, 29-28, 29-28)	3	5:00
Middleweight	Scott Smith	def	Terry Martin	KO (punch)	1	0:29
Welterweight	Joe Riggs	def	Luke Stewart	TKO (punches)	2	2:05
Middleweight	Luke Rockhold	def	Nik Theotikos	submission (rear-naked choke)	1	3:06
Preliminary card
Women's Bantamweight	Kim Couture	def	Lina Kvokov	TKO (punches)	1	1:44
Bantamweight	Darren Uyenoyama	def	Brad Royster	unanimous decision	3	5:00
Featherweight	Alvin Cacdac	def	Jose Palacios	submission (rear-naked choke)	2	3:10
Welterweight	Zak Bucia	def	Adam Steel	submission (guillotine choke)	1	0:35

== See also ==
- List of Strikeforce champions
- List of Strikeforce events
