= List of Strikeforce events =

This is a list of events held and scheduled by Strikeforce, a mixed martial arts organization based in the United States. The first event, Strikeforce: Shamrock vs. Gracie, took place on March 10, 2006.

== Events ==
#	Event title	Date	Venue	Location	Attendance	Broadcast
63	Strikeforce: Marquardt vs. Saffiedine	January 12, 2013	Chesapeake Energy Arena	Oklahoma City, Oklahoma		Showtime
–	Strikeforce: Cormier vs. Mir	November 3, 2012	Chesapeake Energy Arena	Oklahoma City, Oklahoma	Cancelled	
–	Strikeforce: Melendez vs. Healy	September 29, 2012	Power Balance Pavilion	Sacramento, California	Cancelled	
62	Strikeforce: Rousey vs. Kaufman	August 18, 2012	Valley View Casino Center	San Diego, California	3,502	Showtime
61	Strikeforce: Rockhold vs. Kennedy	July 14, 2012	Rose Garden	Portland, Oregon	4,186	Showtime
60	Strikeforce: Barnett vs. Cormier	May 19, 2012	HP Pavilion at San Jose	San Jose, California	5,413	Showtime
59	Strikeforce: Tate vs. Rousey	March 3, 2012	Nationwide Arena	Columbus, Ohio		Showtime
58	Strikeforce: Rockhold vs. Jardine	January 7, 2012	Hard Rock Hotel and Casino	Paradise, Nevada	1,992	Showtime
57	Strikeforce: Melendez vs. Masvidal	December 17, 2011	Valley View Casino Center	San Diego, California	2,995	Showtime
56	Strikeforce Challengers: Britt vs. Sayers	November 18, 2011	Palms Casino Resort	Las Vegas, Nevada		Showtime
55	Strikeforce Challengers: Larkin vs. Rossborough	September 23, 2011	Palms Casino Resort	Las Vegas, Nevada		Showtime
54	Strikeforce: Barnett vs. Kharitonov	September 10, 2011	U.S. Bank Arena	Cincinnati, Ohio		Showtime & HDNet
53	Strikeforce Challengers: Gurgel vs. Duarte	August 12, 2011	Palms Casino Resort	Las Vegas, Nevada		Showtime
52	Strikeforce: Fedor vs. Henderson	July 30, 2011	Sears Centre	Hoffman Estates, Illinois	8,311	Showtime
51	Strikeforce Challengers: Voelker vs. Bowling III	July 22, 2011	Palms Casino Resort	Las Vegas, Nevada	1,876	Showtime
50	Strikeforce Challengers: Fodor vs. Terry	June 24, 2011	ShoWare Center	Kent, Washington	1,901	Showtime
49	Strikeforce: Overeem vs. Werdum	June 18, 2011	American Airlines Center	Dallas, Texas	7,639	Showtime & HDNet
48	Strikeforce: Diaz vs. Daley	April 9, 2011	Valley View Casino Center	San Diego, California	5,789	Showtime
47	Strikeforce Challengers: Wilcox vs. Damm	April 1, 2011	Stockton Arena	Stockton, California		Showtime
46	Strikeforce: Feijao vs. Henderson	March 5, 2011	Nationwide Arena	Columbus, Ohio	7,123	Showtime
45	Strikeforce Challengers: Beerbohm vs. Healy	February 18, 2011	Cedar Park Center	Cedar Park, Texas		Showtime
44	Strikeforce: Fedor vs. Silva	February 12, 2011	Izod Center	East Rutherford, New Jersey	11,287	Showtime & HDNet
43	Strikeforce: Diaz vs. Cyborg	January 29, 2011	HP Pavilion at San Jose	San Jose, California	9,059	Showtime
42	Strikeforce Challengers: Woodley vs. Saffiedine	January 7, 2011	Nashville Municipal Auditorium	Nashville, Tennessee	2,631	Showtime
41	Strikeforce: Henderson vs. Babalu II	December 4, 2010	Scottrade Center	St. Louis, Missouri	7,146	Showtime
40	Strikeforce Challengers: Wilcox vs. Ribeiro	November 19, 2010	Jackson Convention Complex	Jackson, Mississippi		Showtime
39	Strikeforce Challengers: Bowling vs. Voelker	October 22, 2010	Save Mart Center	Fresno, California	3,656	Showtime
38	Strikeforce: Diaz vs. Noons II	October 9, 2010	HP Pavilion at San Jose	San Jose, California	7,559	Showtime
37	Strikeforce: Houston	August 21, 2010	Toyota Center	Houston, Texas	8,635	Showtime
36	Strikeforce Challengers: Riggs vs. Taylor	August 13, 2010	Dodge Theatre	Phoenix, Arizona		Showtime
35	Strikeforce Challengers: del Rosario vs. Mahe	July 23, 2010	Comcast Arena at Everett	Everett, Washington		Showtime
34	Strikeforce: Fedor vs. Werdum	June 26, 2010	HP Pavilion at San Jose	San Jose, California	11,757	Showtime
33	Strikeforce: Los Angeles	June 16, 2010	Nokia Theatre	Los Angeles, California	5,259	Showtime
32	Strikeforce Challengers: Lindland vs. Casey	May 21, 2010	Rose Garden	Portland, Oregon	5,790	Showtime
31	Strikeforce: Heavy Artillery	May 15, 2010	Scottrade Center	St. Louis, Missouri	8,136	Showtime
30	Strikeforce: Nashville	April 17, 2010	Bridgestone Arena	Nashville, Tennessee	8,196	CBS
29	Strikeforce Challengers: Johnson vs. Mahe	March 26, 2010	Save Mart Center	Fresno, California	4,963	Showtime
28	Strikeforce Challengers: Kaufman vs. Hashi	February 26, 2010	San Jose Civic Auditorium	San Jose, California	2,318	Showtime
27	Strikeforce: Miami	January 30, 2010	BankAtlantic Center	Sunrise, Florida	7,010	Showtime
26	Strikeforce: Evolution	December 19, 2009	HP Pavilion at San Jose	San Jose, California	14,749	Showtime
25	Strikeforce Challengers 5: Woodley vs. Bears	November 20, 2009	Memorial Hall	Kansas City, Kansas	2,088	Showtime
24	Strikeforce: Fedor vs. Rogers	November 7, 2009	Sears Centre	Hoffman Estates, Illinois		CBS
23	Strikeforce Challengers 4: Gurgel vs. Evangelista	November 6, 2009	Save Mart Center	Fresno, California	4,157	Showtime
22	Strikeforce Challengers 3: Kennedy vs. Cummings	September 25, 2009	SpiritBank Event Center	Bixby, Oklahoma	2,336	Showtime
21	Strikeforce: Carano vs. Cyborg	August 15, 2009	HP Pavilion at San Jose	San Jose, California	13,976	Showtime
20	Strikeforce Challengers 2: Villasenor vs. Cyborg	June 19, 2009	ShoWare Center	Kent, Washington	2,836	Showtime
19	Strikeforce: Lawler vs. Shields	June 6, 2009	Scottrade Center	St. Louis, Missouri	8,867	Showtime
18	Strikeforce Challengers 1: Evangelista vs. Aina	May 15, 2009	Save Mart Center	Fresno, California	2,322	Showtime
17	Strikeforce: Shamrock vs. Diaz	April 11, 2009	HP Pavilion at San Jose	San Jose, California	15,211	Showtime
16	Strikeforce: Destruction	November 21, 2008	HP Pavilion at San Jose	San Jose, California	8,152	HDNet
15	Strikeforce: Payback	October 3, 2008	Broomfield Events Center	Broomfield, Colorado	3,286	HDNet
14	Strikeforce: At The Mansion II	September 20, 2008	The Playboy Mansion	Beverly Hills, California	2,478	The Score
13	Strikeforce: Young Guns III	September 13, 2008	San Jose Civic Auditorium	San Jose, California	4,789	
12	Strikeforce: Melendez vs. Thomson	June 27, 2008	HP Pavilion at San Jose	San Jose, California	7,288	HDNet
11	Strikeforce: Shamrock vs. Le	March 29, 2008	HP Pavilion at San Jose	San Jose, California	16,326	Showtime
10	Strikeforce: At The Dome	February 23, 2008	Tacoma Dome	Tacoma, Washington	7,089	HDNet
9	Strikeforce: Young Guns II	February 1, 2008	San Jose Civic Auditorium	San Jose, California	5,789	
8	Strikeforce: Four Men Enter, One Man Survives	November 16, 2007	HP Pavilion at San Jose	San Jose, California	7,249	
7	Strikeforce: Playboy Mansion	September 29, 2007	The Playboy Mansion	Beverly Hills, California	3,569	
6	Strikeforce: Shamrock vs. Baroni	June 22, 2007	HP Pavilion at San Jose	San Jose, California	9,672	PPV
5	Strikeforce: Young Guns	February 10, 2007	San Jose Civic Auditorium	San Jose, California	3,169	
4	Strikeforce: Triple Threat	December 8, 2006	HP Pavilion at San Jose	San Jose, California	8,701	
3	Strikeforce: Tank vs. Buentello	October 7, 2006	Save Mart Center	Fresno, California	4,437	
2	Strikeforce: Revenge	June 9, 2006	HP Pavilion at San Jose	San Jose, California	10,374	
1	Strikeforce: Shamrock vs. Gracie	March 10, 2006	HP Pavilion at San Jose	San Jose, California	18,265	

== Event locations ==
- Total event number: 63

These cities have hosted the following numbers of Strikeforce events as of Strikeforce: Marquardt vs. Saffiedine:

- United States (63)

San Jose, California – 19
Fresno, California – 5
Las Vegas, Nevada – 4
San Diego, California – 3
St. Louis, Missouri – 3
Beverly Hills, California – 2
Hoffman Estates, Illinois – 2
Columbus, Ohio – 2
Portland, Oregon – 2
Nashville, Tennessee – 2
Kent, Washington – 2
Oklahoma City, Oklahoma – 1
Paradise, Nevada – 1
Phoenix, Arizona – 1
Los Angeles, California – 1
Stockton, California – 1
Broomfield, Colorado – 1
Sunrise, Florida – 1
Kansas City, Kansas – 1
Jackson, Mississippi – 1
East Rutherford, New Jersey – 1
Cincinnati, Ohio – 1
Bixby, Oklahoma – 1
Cedar Park, Texas – 1
Dallas, Texas – 1
Houston, Texas – 1
Everett, Washington – 1
Tacoma, Washington – 1

== See also ==
- List of Strikeforce champions
- List of Bellator MMA events
- List of DREAM events
- List of EliteXC events
- List of Invicta FC events
- List of ONE Championship events
- List of Pancrase events
- List of Pride FC events
- List of PFL/WSOF events
- List of Shooto Events
- List of UFC events
- List of WEC events
