= Strikeforce: Shamrock vs. Diaz =

Strikeforce mixed martial arts event in 2009

- The poster for Strikeforce: Shamrock vs. Diaz
- Promotion: Strikeforce
- Date: April 11, 2009
- Venue: HP Pavilion
- City: San Jose, California, United States
- Attendance: 15,211
- Total gate: $750,000

Event chronology
Strikeforce: Destruction	Strikeforce: Shamrock vs. Diaz	Strikeforce: Lawler vs. Shields

Strikeforce: Shamrock vs. Diaz was a mixed martial arts event held by Strikeforce on April 11, 2009 at the HP Pavilion in San Jose, California. It was the first event promoted by Strikeforce after their acquisition of assets from the defunct EliteXC promotion through its parent company ProElite. It aired on the Showtime cable network and online through Strikeforce All Access. Gus Johnson, Mauro Ranallo and Pat Miletich were commentating during the broadcast and Jimmy Lennon Jr. was the ring announcer. The official attendance was announced to be 14,409. The event drew an estimated 364,000 viewers on Showtime.

== Event ==
Gilbert Melendez was originally scheduled to fight Josh Thomson before Thomson broke his leg while sparring. Rodrigo Damm was brought in as a replacement instead.

=== Weigh-ins ===
All fighters except Cris Cyborg and Brandon Michaels made their contracted weight during the official weigh-ins on April 10. Cyborg originally weighed in at 152.0 lb (68.9 kg) for her 145.0 lb (65.8 kg) fight with Hitomi Akano and had a few hours to cut down to 151.0 lb (68.5 kg) to get within the allowed 6 lb (2.7 kg) disparity. On her second attempt she weighed in at 150.5 lb (68.3 kg) and was cleared to fight. Cyborg was fined 20% of her fight purse by the California State Athletic Commission for not making weight with half of it going to Akano.

Brandon Michaels weighed in at 187.5 lb (85.0 kg), missing the middleweight limit of 185 lb (84 kg). His bout with Raul Castillo (183 lb (83 kg)) was changed to a catchweight bout at 187.5 lb (85.0 kg), with Michaels also being fined 20% of his purse.

== Results ==
Main Card
Weight class				Method	Round	Time	Notes
Catchweight (180 lb)	Nick Diaz	def.	Frank Shamrock	TKO (punches)	2	3:57
Lightweight	Gilbert Melendez	def.	Rodrigo Damm	KO (punches)	2	2:02	(Note: For the interim Strikeforce Lightweight Championship.)
Middleweight	Scott Smith	def.	Benji Radach	KO (punch)	3	3:24
Catchweight (151 lb)	Cris Cyborg	def.	Hitomi Akano	TKO (punches)	3	0:35
Heavyweight	Brett Rogers	def.	Ron Humphrey	TKO (knees)	2	1:38
Preliminary Card
Middleweight	Luke Rockhold	def.	Buck Meredith	Submission (rear-naked choke)	1	4:07
Middleweight	Eric Lawson	def.	Waylon Kennell	TKO (punches)	1	4:54
Catchweight (187.5 lb)	Raul Castillo	def.	Brandon Michaels	Submission (rear-naked choke)	1	1:45
Welterweight	James Terry	def.	Zak Bucia	Decision (unanimous)	3	5:00
Bantamweight	Shingo Kohara	def.	Jeremy Tavares	KO (knee)	2	0:04

== Reported Payout ==
The following is a list of fighter salaries as provided by the California State Athletic Commission. The figures do not include deductions for items such as insurance, licenses and taxes. Additionally, the figures do not include money paid by sponsors, which can often be a substantial portion of a fighter's income.

- Gilbert Melendez: $49,890 (no win bonus) def. Rodrigo Damm: $9,190
- Nick Diaz: $39,950 ($10,000 win bonus) def. Frank Shamrock: $369,790
- Scott Smith: $49,940 ($25,000 win bonus) def. Benji Radach: $16,940
- Brett Rogers: $39,940 ($20,000 win bonus) def. Ron "Abongo" Humphrey: $3,205
- Cris Cyborg: $18,000 ($10,000 win bonus) def. Hitomi Akano: $1,450
- Luke Rockhold: $6,000 ($3,000 win bonus) def. Buck Meredith: $1,540
- Eric Lawson: $9,950 ($2,000 win bonus) def. Waylon Kennell: $1,950
- Raul Castillo: $7,890 ($3,500 win bonus) def. Brandon Michaels: $1,500
- James Terry: $3,940 ($2,000 win bonus) def. Zak Bucia: $1,500
- Shingo Kohara: $940 (no win bonus) def. Jeremy Tavares: $940

== See also ==
- Strikeforce (mixed martial arts)
- List of Strikeforce champions
- List of Strikeforce events
- 2009 in Strikeforce
