= Strikeforce: Shamrock vs. Le =

Strikeforce mixed martial arts event in 2008

- The poster for Strikeforce: Shamrock vs. Le
- Promotion: Strikeforce and EliteXC
- Date: March 29, 2008
- Venue: HP Pavilion at San Jose
- City: San Jose, California, United States
- Attendance: 16,326

Event chronology
Strikeforce: At The Dome	Strikeforce: Shamrock vs. Le	Strikeforce: Melendez vs. Thomson

Strikeforce: Shamrock vs. Le was a mixed martial arts event co-promoted by Strikeforce and EliteXC. The event took place on Saturday, March 29, 2008 at the HP Pavilion in San Jose, California.

== Background ==
The main card aired live on the Showtime premium cable channel.

The event originally featured the anticipated Gilbert Melendez vs. Josh Thomson, but it was called off because Thomson injured himself training.

Nick Diaz was also scheduled to fight but was pulled from the card due to undisclosed reasons.

Referees assigned for the event were Mario Yamasaki, Herb Dean and Jon Schorle.

== Results ==
Main card
Weight class				Method	Round	Time	Notes
Middleweight	Cung Le	def.	Frank Shamrock (c)	TKO (arm injury)	3	5:00	(Note: For the Strikeforce Middleweight Championship.)
Lightweight	Gilbert Melendez (c)	def.	Gabe Lemley	TKO (punches)	2	2:18	(Note: For the Strikeforce Lightweight Championship.)
Heavyweight	Wayne Cole	def.	Mike Kyle	Submission (armbar)	1	0:45
Middleweight	Joey Villasenor	def.	Ryan Jensen	KO (punch)	1	4:45
Preliminary card
Catchweight (162 lb)	Billy Evangelista	def.	Marlon Sims	KO (punch)	3	0:39
Welterweight	Drew Fickett	def.	Jae Suk Lim	Submission (guillotine choke)	1	1:14
Welterweight	Tiki Ghosn	def.	Luke Stewart	Decision (unanimous) (29-28, 29-28, 30-27)	3	5:00
Bantamweight	Darren Uyenoyama	def.	Anthony Figueroa	Submission (guillotine choke)	1	1:27
Catchweight (180 lb)	Jesse Jones	def.	Jesse Gillespie	TKO (punches)	1	0:35

== Fighter salaries ==
Below are the disclosed purses for each of the fighters :

MAIN CARD FIGHTERS

- Frank Shamrock: $300,000 (lost to Cung Le; no win bonus listed)
- Cung Le: $200,000 (defeated Frank Shamrock; no win bonus listed)
- Gilbert Melendez: $50,000 (defeated Gabe Lemley; no win bonus listed)
- Joey Villasenor: $36,000 (defeated Ryan Jensen; win bonus was $18,000
- Wayne Cole: $10,000 (defeated Mike Kyle; win bonus was $5,000)
- Drew Fickett: $10,000 (defeated Jae Suk Lim; win bonus was $5,000)
- Mike Kyle: $10,000 (lost to Wayne Cole)
- Gabe Lemley: $7,000 (lost to Gilbert Melendez)
- Billy Evangelista: $10,000 (defeated Marlon Sims; win bonus was $5,000)
- Jae Suk Lim: $3,000 (lost to Drew Fickett)
- Ryan Jensen: $6,000 (lost to Joey Villasenor)
- Marlon Sims: $2,500 (lost to Billy Evangelista)

PRELIMINARY CARD FIGHTERS

- Tiki Ghosn: $8,000 (defeated Luke Stewart; win bonus was $2,000)
- Luke Stewart: $6,000 (lost to Tiki Ghosn)
- Darren Uyenoyama: $4,000 (defeated Anthony Figueroa; win bonus was $2,000)
- Jesse Jones: $2,150 (defeated Jesse Gillespie; win bonus was $500)
- Anthony Figueroa: $2,000 (lost to Darren Uyenoyama)
- Jesse Gillespie: $1,200 (lost to Jesse Jones)

DISCLOSED FIGHTER PAYROLL: $667,850

== See also ==
- Strikeforce (mixed martial arts)
- List of Strikeforce champions
- List of Strikeforce events
- List of EliteXC events
- 2008 in Strikeforce
