= Strikeforce: Melendez vs. Thomson =

Strikeforce mixed martial arts event in 2008

- The poster for Strikeforce: Melendez vs. Thomson
- Promotion: Strikeforce
- Date: June 27, 2008
- Venue: HP Pavilion at San Jose
- City: San Jose, California
- Attendance: 7,288

Event chronology
Strikeforce: Shamrock vs. Le	Strikeforce: Melendez vs. Thomson	Strikeforce: Young Guns III

Strikeforce: Melendez vs. Thomson was a mixed martial arts event promoted by Strikeforce. The event took place at the HP Pavilion at San Jose in San Jose, California on Friday, June 27, 2008. The main event was a match between lightweights Gilbert Melendez and Josh Thomson for the Strikeforce Lightweight title.

== Results ==
Main card
Weight class				Method	Round	Time	Notes
Lightweight	Josh Thomson	def.	Gilbert Melendez (c)	Decision (unanimous)	5	5:00	(Note: For the Strikeforce Lightweight Championship.)
Light Heavyweight	Bobby Southworth (c)	def.	Anthony Ruiz	Decision (unanimous)	5	5:00	(Note: For the Strikeforce Light Heavyweight Championship.)
Lightweight	Billy Evangelista	def.	Nam Phan	Decision (split)	3	5:00
Middleweight	Eric Lawson	def.	Jesse Gillespie	Submission (rear-naked choke)	1	1:03
Women's Featherweight	Miesha Tate	def.	Elaina Maxwell	Decision (unanimous)	3	5:00
Preliminary card
Middleweight	Jeremiah Metcalf	def.	Raymond Daniels	Submission (rear-naked choke)	2	0:59
Bantamweight	Chris Cariaso	def.	Anthony Figueroa	Submission (rear-naked choke)	2	4:34
Lightweight	Bobby Stack	def.	Jose Palacios	Decision (unanimous)	3	5:00
Featherweight	Bryan Caraway	def.	Scott Garland	Submission (rear-naked choke)	1	1:39
Welterweight	Cyrillo Padilha	def.	Jesse Jones	Decision (unanimous)	3	5:00
Light Heavyweight	Jorge Interiano	def.	Travis Johnson	TKO (doctor stoppage)	2	3:00
Lightweight	Alexander Trevino	def.	Eric Jacob	Submission (armbar)	1	0:37

== See also ==
- Strikeforce (mixed martial arts)
- List of Strikeforce champions
- List of Strikeforce events
- 2008 in Strikeforce
