= Alexander Trevino =

American mixed martial arts fighter

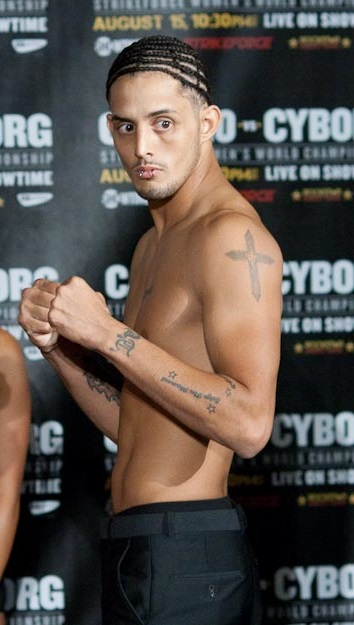
- Born: 1981 (age 44–45); Great Falls, Montana, United States
- Other names: Spider
- Height: 6 ft 0 in (1.83 m)
- Weight: 170 lb (77 kg; 12 st)
- Division: Lightweight (current) Welterweight
- Fighting out of: San Jose, California, United States
- Team: Gracie Fighter MMA Academy
- Years active: 2008–present

Mixed martial arts record
- Total: 11
- Wins: 6
- By knockout: 2
- By submission: 3
- By decision: 1
- Losses: 5
- By knockout: 2
- By decision: 3

Other information
- Mixed martial arts record from Sherdog

Alexander Trevino (born 1981) is an American mixed martial artist, who is best known for his 4-fight stint with now-defunct promotion, Strikeforce. He was cast a member of former UFC champion, Frank Shamrock's reality series, "School of Hard Knocks” and was part of the Shamrock Submission fighting team until December 2009, and is now part of the Gracie Fighter MMA fighting team.

== Early life ==
Trevino graduated from Montague high school in Montague, Michigan, in 1999. While in high school he won a state medal in wrestling and trained in boxing at Lane's Gym in Muskegon. He also trained in Jiu-jitsu at White Lake Combat Club in Michigan under head instructor Frank Bumstead. Trevino held an amateur record of 5–1 before attending the reality show “School of Hard Knocks”. Trevino moved to San Jose, California to train with the Shamrock Submission fight team, until he left in December 2009.

== Mixed martial arts career ==
=== Strikeforce ===
Trevino made his Strikeforce debut on June 27, 2008, at Strikeforce: Melendez vs. Thomson against Eric Jacob. He won via first round armbar. He then faced Gennaro Strangis at Strikeforce: Young Guns III on September 13, 2008. Trevino won via unanimous decision.

His next fight was at Strikeforce: Carano vs. Cyborg on August 15, 2009, facing Isaiah Hill. Trevino won by keylock submission. Trevino suffered his first loss under the Strikeforce banner, when he lost a unanimous decision to Rico Altamirano at Strikeforce Challengers 4 on November 6, 2009.

=== Post-Strikeforce ===
In his latest fight, Trevino faced Dave Courchine at XFC 27: Frozen Fury on December 13, 2013. He lost the fight via second-round knockout.

== Personal life ==
Trevino attended the School of Hard Knocks reality TV show, a show intended for people who have had problems with personal abuse and use MMA as a way to recover.

== Mixed martial arts record ==
Professional record breakdown
| 11 matches | 6 wins | 5 losses |
| By knockout | 2 | 2 |
| By submission | 3 | 0 |
| By decision | 1 | 3 |

| Res. | Record | Opponent | Method | Event | Date | Round | Time | Location | Notes |
|---|---|---|---|---|---|---|---|---|---|
| Win | 6–5 | Erick Lozano | Submission (armbar) | KnockOut Promotions 49 | March 26, 2016 | 1 | 1:03 | Grand Rapids, Michigan, United States | |
| Loss | 5–5 | Bryant Whitaker | Decision (unanimous) | MFL 39: Stamann vs. Dunn | October 24, 2015 | 3 | 5:00 | South Bend, Indiana, United States | |
| Loss | 5–4 | Dave Courchaine | KO (punch) | XFC 27 - Frozen Fury | December 13, 2013 | 2 | 0:37 | Muskegon, Michigan, United States | Lightweight debut. |
| Loss | 5–3 | Ousmane Thomas Diagne | TKO (kick to the body) | Red Canvas - Art of Submission 2 | September 15, 2012 | 3 | 3:39 | San Jose, California, United States | |
| Win | 5–2 | Eric Moon | KO (punch) | G-Force Fights - Bad Blood 5 | February 26, 2011 | 1 | 2:08 | Grand Rapids, Michigan, United States | |
| Loss | 4–2 | Jason Meaders | Decision (unanimous) | LOTC - Lords of the Cage | November 19, 2010 | 3 | 5:00 | Temecula, California, United States | |
| Loss | 4–1 | Rico Altamirano | Decision (unanimous) | Strikeforce Challengers 4 | November 6, 2009 | 3 | 5:00 | Fresno, California, United States | |
| Win | 4–0 | Isaiah Hill | Submission (keylock) | Strikeforce: Carano vs. Cyborg | August 15, 2009 | 1 | 3:56 | San Jose, California, United States | |
| Win | 3–0 | Gennaro Strangis | Decision (unanimous) | Strikeforce: Young Guns III | September 13, 2008 | 3 | 3:00 | San Jose, California, United States | |
| Win | 2–0 | Eric Jacob | Submission (armbar) | Strikeforce: Melendez vs. Thomson | June 27, 2008 | 1 | 0:37 | San Jose, California, United States | |
| Win | 1–0 | Justin Farmer | KO (knee) | CCFC - Mayhem | May 17, 2008 | 3 | 2:59 | Santa Rosa, California, United States | |
