= Fight Life =

Mixed martial arts documentary

- Directed by: James Z. Feng
- Written by: James Z. Feng
- Produced by: Seher Basak, James Z. Feng, James Y. Shih, Lanser Boint
- Starring: Jake Shields; Lyle Beerbohm; Nick Diaz; Frank Shamrock; Gilbert Melendez; Chuck Liddell; Nate Diaz
- Cinematography: Michael Solidum
- Edited by: Barbara Grandvoinet, Ramon Vasquez Jr.
- Release date: January 20, 2012
- Running time: 80 minutes
- Country: United States
- Language: English

Fight Life is a feature-length documentary on the sport of mixed martial arts. The film is directed by independent filmmaker James Z. Feng and produced by RiLL Films. The film focuses on the lives of professional mixed martial arts fighters outside the cage, primarily profiling Jake Shields, and Lyle Beerbohm. The film unveils the sport of mixed martial arts and what it takes to be a modern-day professional fighter.

== Production ==
A self-funded independent production, filming took place from 2008 to 2011 all across the country.

== Release ==
The film was released in 2012.
