= Darren Uyenoyama =

American mixed martial arts fighter

- Born: October 15, 1979 (age 47); San Francisco, California, United States
- Other names: BC
- Height: 5 ft 6 in (168 cm)
- Weight: 125 lb (57 kg; 8 st 13 lb)
- Division: Featherweight; Bantamweight; Flyweight
- Reach: 65 in (165 cm)
- Stance: Orthodox
- Fighting out of: San Francisco, California, United States
- Team: Faito Tamashii Combat Club Combat Sports Academy
- Rank: Black belt in Brazilian Jiu-Jitsu under Ralph Gracie
- Years active: 2002–2016

Mixed martial arts record
- Total: 16
- Wins: 10
- By knockout: 2
- By submission: 4
- By decision: 4
- Losses: 6
- By knockout: 2
- By submission: 1
- By decision: 3

Other information
- Mixed martial arts record from Sherdog
- Last updated on: 2011

Darren Uyenoyama
Medal record

Representing United States

Men's Grappling

FILA World Grappling Championships
Gold medal – first place	2007 Antalya	-62 kg

Darren Uyenoyama (born October 15, 1979) is a retired American professional mixed martial artist. Uyenoyama formerly competed for the Ultimate Fighting Championship, Strikeforce, DREAM, DEEP, and Shooto.

== Background ==
Uyenoyama was born and raised in San Francisco/South San Francisco area, and is a third-generation Japanese-American. Uyenoyama attended El Camino High School where he participated in wrestling. He also wrestled at Skyline College and was studying Kinesiology. He began training at Ralph Gracie's Brazilian jiu-jitsu academy while attending college. Uyenoyama had a successful career in BJJ, winning tournaments, and eventually transitioned his skills to mixed martial arts.

== Mixed martial arts career ==
=== Early career ===
Uyenoyama had his first mixed martial arts fight in 2002 against Rambaa Somdet, and although he did win his debut, he took a five-year hiatus before returning with another win.

=== DREAM ===
Uyenoyama made his DREAM debut against Hideo Tokoro and lost the fight via unanimous decision.

=== Strikeforce ===
Uyenoyama made his Strikeforce debut, defeating Andrew Valladerez via a rear-naked choke submission in 59 seconds at Strikeforce: Young Guns.

Uyenoyama moved his Strikeforce record to 2-0 with another first-round submission win with a guillotine choke over Anthony Figueroa.

Uyenoyama's third and final Strikeforce appearance took place at Strikeforce: Destruction. Uyenoyama won via unanimous decision.

=== Ultimate Fighting Championship ===
Uyenoyama signed with the Ultimate Fighting Championship in 2011.

Uyenoyama made his bantamweight debut against Japanese superstar Norifumi Yamamoto at UFC on Fox: Velasquez vs. Dos Santos. Uyenoyama defeated heavy favorite Yamamoto via unanimous decision.

Uyenoyama was expected to make his Flyweight debut at UFC on Fox 3 on May 5, 2012, against John Dodson. However, Uyenoyama was forced out of the bout and replaced by promotional newcomer Tim Elliott.

Uyenoyama was expected to face Louis Gaudinot on October 5, 2012, at UFC on FX 5. However, Gaudinot was forced out of the bout with an injury and replaced by promotional newcomer Phil Harris. Uyenoyama submitted Harris in the second round with a rear-naked choke.

Uyenoyama faced Joseph Benavidez on April 20, 2013, at UFC on Fox 7. Uyenoyama lost the fight via TKO in the second round.

Uyenoyama was expected to face John Moraga on December 14, 2013, at UFC on Fox 9. However, Moraga pulled out of the bout with an undisclosed injury and was replaced by promotional newcomer Alptekin Özkiliç. Uyenoyama lost the fight via split decision, and was subsequently released from the promotion shortly after.

=== Post-UFC career ===
Following his release from the UFC, Uyenoyama signed with Pacific Xtreme Combat in September 2014. He faced Shane Alvarez at PXC 45 on October 24, 2014, and won the fight via ground-and-pound TKO in the first round.

On March 13, 2015, he faced Kentaro Watanabe at PXC 47, winning the fight via split decision.

Uyenoyama challenged Riley Dutro for the vacant PXC Flyweight title on November 18, 2016, at PXC 55, losing the fight by TKO (punches) in the first round.

== Mixed martial arts record ==
Professional record breakdown
16 matches	10 wins	6 losses
By knockout	2	2
By submission	4	1
By decision	4	3

Res.	Record	Opponent	Method	Event	Date	Round	Time	Location	Notes
Loss	10–6	Riley Dutro	TKO (punches)	Pacific Xtreme Combat 55	November 18, 2016	1	2:46	Mangilao, Guam	For the vacant Pacific Xtreme Combat (PXC) Flyweight Championship.
Win	10–5	Kentaro Watanabe	Decision (split)	Pacific Xtreme Combat 47	March 13, 2015	3	5:00	Mangilao, Guam	
Win	9–5	Shane Alvarez	TKO (punches)	Pacific Xtreme Combat 45	October 24, 2014	1	N/A	Mangilao, Guam	
Loss	8–5	Alp Ozkilic	Decision (split)	UFC on Fox: Johnson vs. Benavidez 2	December 14, 2013	3	5:00	Sacramento, California, United States	
Loss	8–4	Joseph Benavidez	TKO (body punch)	UFC on Fox: Henderson vs. Melendez	April 20, 2013	2	4:50	San Jose, California, United States	
Win	8–3	Phil Harris	Submission (rear-naked choke)	UFC on FX: Browne vs. Bigfoot	October 5, 2012	2	3:38	Minneapolis, Minnesota, United States	Flyweight debut.
Win	7–3	Norifumi Yamamoto	Decision (unanimous)	UFC on Fox: Velasquez vs. Dos Santos	November 12, 2011	3	5:00	Anaheim, California, United States	
Win	6–3	Shuichiro Katsumura	TKO (punches)	Shooto: The Way of Shooto 5: Like a Tiger, Like a Dragon	September 23, 2010	2	3:53	Tokyo, Japan	
Loss	5–3	Tomoya Miyashita	Submission (guillotine choke)	Deep: 47 Impact	April 17, 2010	2	1:10	Tokyo, Japan	
Win	5–2	Brad Royster	Decision (unanimous)	Strikeforce: Destruction	November 8, 2008	3	5:00	San Jose, California, United States	
Loss	4–2	Hideo Tokoro	Decision (unanimous)	Dream 4: Middleweight Grand Prix 2008 Second Round	June 15, 2008	2	5:00	Yokohama, Kanagawa, Japan	
Win	4–1	Anthony Figueroa	Submission (guillotine choke)	Strikeforce: Shamrock vs. Le	March 28, 2008	1	1:27	San Jose, California, United States	
Win	3–1	Andrew Valladerez	Submission (rear-naked choke)	Strikeforce: Young Guns II	February 1, 2008	1	0:59	San Jose, California, United States	
Loss	2–1	Rolando Velasco	Decision (unanimous)	CCFC: Undefeated	October 6, 2007	3	5:00	San Mateo, California, United States	
Win	2–0	Will Nerbonne	Submission (rear-naked choke)	CCFC: Judgement Day	February 17, 2007	1	2:30	Santa Rosa, California, United States	
Win	1–0	Rambaa Somdet	Decision (unanimous)	DEEP: 5th Impact	September 6, 2002	3	5:00	Tokyo, Japan	
