= Strikeforce: At The Dome =

Strikeforce mixed martial arts event in 2008

- The poster for Strikeforce: At The Dome
- Promotion: Strikeforce
- Date: February 23, 2008
- Venue: Tacoma Dome
- City: Tacoma, Washington, United States
- Attendance: 7,089

Event chronology
Strikeforce: Young Guns II	Strikeforce: At The Dome	Strikeforce: Shamrock vs. Le

Strikeforce: At The Dome was a mixed martial arts event promoted by Strikeforce in conjunction with Brian Halquist Productions. The event took place at the Tacoma Dome in Tacoma, Washington on Saturday, February 23, 2008.

The event marked the North American MMA debut of Bob Sapp.

== Results ==
Main card
Weight class				Method	Round	Time	Notes
Heavyweight	Jan Nortje	def.	Bob Sapp	TKO (punches)	1	0:55
Lightweight	Jorge Masvidal	def.	Ryan Healy	Decision (unanimous)	3	5:00
Middleweight	Cory Devela	def.	Joe Riggs	TKO (Submission to slam)	1	1:22
Heavyweight	Maurice Smith	def.	Rick Roufus	Submission (kimura)	1	1:53
Preliminary card
Welterweight	Eddy Ellis	def.	Steve Berger	Decision (unanimous)	3	5:00
Heavyweight	Mychal Clark	def.	Josh Bennett	TKO (swollen eye)	2	5:00
Welterweight	Lyle Beerbohm	def.	Ray Perales	Submission (guillotine choke)	3	1:19
Heavyweight	Mike Hayes	def.	Matt Kovacs	Decision (unanimous)	3	5:00
Featherweight	Zack Skinner	def.	Scott Shaffer	Decision (unanimous)	3	5:00
Welterweight	Nathan Coy	def.	Dave Courchaine	KO (punch)	1	1:46

== See also ==
- Strikeforce (mixed martial arts)
- List of Strikeforce champions
- List of Strikeforce events
- 2008 in Strikeforce
