= Lyle Beerbohm =

American mixed martial arts fighter

- Born: February 5, 1979 (age 47); Spokane, Washington, United States
- Other names: Fancy Pants
- Nationality: American
- Height: 5 ft 10 in (1.78 m)
- Weight: 179.5 lb (81.4 kg; 12.82 st)
- Division: Middleweight; Welterweight; Lightweight
- Reach: 70 in (178 cm)
- Fighting out of: Spokane, Washington, United States
- Team: Fancy Pants Fight Team; SikJitsu
- Rank: Black belt in Brazilian Jiu-Jitsu
- Years active: 2007-2013

Mixed martial arts record
- Total: 28
- Wins: 25
- By knockout: 9
- By submission: 13
- By decision: 3
- Losses: 3
- By submission: 1
- By decision: 2

Amateur record
- Total: 10
- Wins: 10
- By knockout: 4
- By submission: 2
- Losses: 0

Other information
- Mixed martial arts record from Sherdog
- Last updated on: December 14, 2010

Lyle Beerbohm (born February 5, 1979) is a retired American professional mixed martial artist. A professional competitor from 2007 until 2013, he fought for Strikeforce, the World Series of Fighting, EliteXC, and King of the Cage.

== Mixed martial arts career ==
=== Early career ===
Beerbohm has openly stated he discovered his passion for MMA while locked up in prison at Walla Walla for charges related to methamphetamine usage. On the day of his release, Beerbohm had his father stop at a Brazilian jiu-jitsu training center in Spokane, Washington. Beerbohm later had his first amateur MMA bout after a week of training. As an amateur, he went undefeated with a record of 10–0. Beerbohm only spent 23 months learning and training in MMA before going pro.

Beerbohm made his professional debut in April 2007 and amassed an undefeated record of 6–0 before signing with EliteXC in 2008. He then went undefeated 2–0 in the organization before it was dissolved.

=== Strikeforce ===
Following the closing of EliteXC, Beerbohm fought for both King of the Cage and Strikeforce. In October 2009, he signed a multi-fight deal with Strikeforce. He scored the biggest win of his career in May 2010 over heralded BJJ practitioner Vítor Ribeiro by split decision on the Strikeforce: Heavy Artillery card.

On February 18, 2011, Beerbohm lost the first fight of his career via unanimous decision to MMA veteran Pat Healy at Strikeforce Challengers: Beerbohm vs. Healy.

Beerbohm quickly returned to action and faced Shinya Aoki on April 9, 2011, at Strikeforce: Diaz vs. Daley. He lost the fight via submission in the first round.

=== Post-Strikeforce ===
Beerbohm defeated former PRIDE and UFC fighter Marcus Aurélio in his ShoFight debut after signing a one-fight contract with the promotion.

=== World Series of Fighting ===
In September 2012 Beerbohm signed a contract with the Las Vegas-based promotion World Series of Fighting; the owner of WSOF, K-1 kickboxing legend Ray Sefo, personally met with Beerbohm to secure the multi fight contract in his home state of Washington. In his debut Beerbohm faced UFC vet Jacob Volkmann at WSOF 3 on June 14, 2013. He lost via unanimous decision.

== Television and film ==
Beerbohm stars in Fight Life, an award-winning documentary on the sport of MMA. The film documents his life inside and outside the cage from 2008 to 2012, the film is directed by James Z. Feng and released in 2013.

== Personal life ==
Beerbohm received his nickname "Fancy Pants" due to the unusual multi-colored and form-fitting shorts that he wears during his fights. They are personally made by his mother.

Beerbohm has openly talked about his struggles with drug addiction. Despite staying clean from methamphetamine for a number of years, in 2016 Beerbohm relapsed and is currently dealing with a number of criminal accusations related to recent arrests, including possession of a controlled substance.

== Mixed martial arts record ==
Professional record breakdown
| 28 matches | 25 wins | 3 losses |
| By knockout | 9 | 0 |
| By submission | 13 | 1 |
| By decision | 3 | 2 |

| Res. | Record | Opponent | Method | Event | Date | Round | Time | Location | Notes |
|---|---|---|---|---|---|---|---|---|---|
| Win | 25–3 | Devin Dinh | Submission (rear-naked choke) | Conquest of the Cage 14 | November 20, 2013 | 1 | 4:44 | Airway Heights, Washington, United States | Middleweight debut. |
| Win | 24–3 | Wesley Golden | Submission (rear-naked choke) | Northwest Fighting: Young Guns 9 | September 21, 2013 | 1 | 3:28 | Usk, Washington, United States | |
| Win | 23–3 | Victor Estrada | TKO (knees to the body) | Conquest of the Cage 13 | July 20, 2013 | 1 | N/A | Airway Heights, Washington, United States | Lightweight bout. |
| Loss | 22–3 | Jacob Volkmann | Decision (unanimous) | World Series of Fighting 3 | June 14, 2013 | 3 | 5:00 | Las Vegas, Nevada, United States | Lightweight bout. |
| Win | 22–2 | Justin Larsson | Submission (rear-naked choke) | Northwest Fighting: Young Guns 6 | March 30, 2013 | 2 | 2:42 | Usk, Washington, United States | |
| Win | 21–2 | Chris Ensley | TKO (punches) | Northwest Fighting: Young Guns 5 | January 12, 2013 | 2 | 0:17 | Usk, Washington, United States | |
| Win | 20–2 | Kenny Ento | Submission (rear-naked choke) | KOTC: Breaking Point | August 23, 2012 | 1 | 4:28 | Worley, Idaho, United States | Catchweight (179 lbs) bout. |
| Win | 19–2 | Marcus Aurélio | Decision (unanimous) | ShoFight 20 | June 16, 2012 | 3 | 5:00 | Springfield, Missouri, United States | |
| Win | 18–2 | Chris Ensley | Submission (armbar) | KOTC: Wild Card | May 17, 2012 | 1 | 1:26 | Worley, Idaho, United States | |
| Win | 17–2 | Cleburn Walker | Submission (guillotine choke) | WMMA1: McCorkle vs. Heden | March 31, 2012 | 1 | 2:34 | El Paso, Texas, United States | Return to Welterweight. |
| Loss | 16–2 | Shinya Aoki | Submission (neck crank) | Strikeforce: Diaz vs. Daley | April 9, 2011 | 1 | 1:33 | San Diego, California, United States | |
| Loss | 16–1 | Pat Healy | Decision (unanimous) | Strikeforce Challengers: Beerbohm vs. Healy | February 18, 2011 | 3 | 5:00 | Cedar Park, Texas, United States | |
| Win | 16–0 | Talon Hoffman | Submission (guillotine choke) | Rumble on the Ridge XV | December 4, 2010 | 1 | 2:48 | Snoqualmie, Washington, United States | Catchweight (165 lbs) bout. |
| Win | 15–0 | Josh Calvo | Technical Submission (guillotine choke) | Rumble on the Ridge XIV | October 30, 2010 | 2 | 0:20 | Snoqualmie, Washington, United States | |
| Win | 14–0 | Vítor Ribeiro | Decision (split) | Strikeforce: Heavy Artillery | May 15, 2010 | 3 | 5:00 | St. Louis, Missouri, United States | |
| Win | 13–0 | Josh Martin | TKO (elbows) | Arena Rumble: Guida vs. Horn | September 12, 2009 | 1 | 1:29 | Spokane, Washington, United States | |
| Win | 12–0 | Duane Ludwig | Submission (bulldog choke) | Strikeforce Challengers: Villasenor vs. Cyborg | June 19, 2009 | 1 | 4:27 | Kent, Washington, United States | Catchweight (160 lbs) bout. |
| Win | 11–0 | Jorge Sarat | TKO (punches) | KOTC: Fusion | January 17, 2009 | 2 | 3:48 | Mt. Pleasant, Michigan, United States | Lightweight debut. |
| Win | 10–0 | Rafaello Oliveira | TKO (doctor stoppage) | ShoXC: Elite Challenger Series | October 10, 2008 | 1 | 5:00 | Hammond, Indiana, United States | Catchweight (160 lbs) bout. |
| Win | 9–0 | Ed Nuno | Decision (unanimous) | SF 22: Re-Awakening | April 18, 2008 | 3 | 5:00 | Portland, Oregon, United States | |
| Win | 8–0 | Dave Knight | Submission (guillotine choke) | XCC 6: Western Threat | April 5, 2008 | 1 | 3:44 | Reno, Nevada, United States | |
| Win | 7–0 | Vince Guzman | Submission (rear naked choke) | ShoXC: Elite Challenger Series | March 21, 2008 | 2 | 3:26 | Santa Ynez, California, United States | |
| Win | 6–0 | Ray Perales | Submission (guillotine choke) | Strikeforce: At The Dome | February 23, 2008 | 3 | 1:19 | Tacoma, Washington, United States | |
| Win | 5–0 | Gerald Strebendt | Submission (injury) | Elite Warriors Championship | January 12, 2008 | 1 | 2:42 | San Francisco, California, United States | |
| Win | 4–0 | Jeremy Burnett | TKO (punches) | Conquest of the Cage | November 6, 2007 | 1 | 4:44 | Seattle, Washington, United States | |
| Win | 3–0 | Felix Jose Carrillo | TKO (punches) | Ringside Ticket | August 30, 2007 | 3 | 1:16 | Highland, California, United States | |
| Win | 2–0 | Dean Henderson | TKO (doctor stoppage) | Xtreme Cage Combat 4 | June 2, 2007 | 5 | N/A | Reno, Nevada, United States | |
| Win | 1–0 | Kyle Hutchinson | TKO (punches) | Combat Caged Warriors | April 6, 2007 | 3 | 0:51 | Spokane, Washington, United States | |

== Entrance music ==
| Event | Entrance Music |
|---|---|
| Arena Rumble: Guida vs. Horn | Bleed – Soulfly |
| Strikeforce: At The Dome | Ruff Ryder's Anthem – DMX |
