= Nam Phan =

American mixed martial arts fighter

- Born: March 13, 1983 (age 43); Westminster, California, U.S.
- Height: 5 ft 6 in (1.68 m)
- Weight: 145 lb (66 kg; 10 st 5 lb)
- Division: Bantamweight; Featherweight; Lightweight
- Reach: 70 in (180 cm)
- Fighting out of: Garden Grove, California
- Team: Nam Phan MMA Academy; Team Alpha Male
- Rank: 2nd degree black belt in Việt Quyền Đạo; Black belt in Karate; Black belt in Judo; Black belt in Brazilian jiu-jitsu

Professional boxing record
- Total: 12
- Wins: 3
- By knockout: 2
- Losses: 8
- By knockout: 1
- Draws: 1

Mixed martial arts record
- Total: 38
- Wins: 21
- By knockout: 8
- By submission: 6
- By decision: 7
- Losses: 17
- By knockout: 4
- By submission: 3
- By decision: 10

Other information
- Boxing record from BoxRec
- Mixed martial arts record from Sherdog

Nhat Nam Si Phan (born March 13, 1983), better known as Nam Phan, is an American retired mixed martial artist and professional boxer. A professional in mixed martial arts since 2001, Phan has competed for the UFC, WEC, Strikeforce, World Victory Road, and was a contestant on The Ultimate Fighter: Team GSP vs. Team Koscheck. He has competed in Japanese MMA organization Pancrase and won the title of King of Pancrase in the featherweight division in 2015.

== Background ==
Born and raised in California, Phan began training in Tae Kwon Do at the age of four. A few years later, Phan began karate and did that for eight years earning his black belt. By the age of 16, he had earned a second degree black belt in Việt Quyền Đạo, a Vietnamese combat martial art. Phan then began studying Brazilian jiu-jitsu in the year 2000 earning his black belt He is also a professional boxer with a record of 3-8-1.

== Mixed martial arts career ==
=== Early career ===
Phan made his professional mixed martial arts debut against Jason Maxwell in October 2001, and won due to a second-round TKO. He then won his following three fights also, before tasting defeat at the hands of Rob McCullough in April 2003. In December 2006, and now with a 12–2 record, he made his promotional debut with Strikeforce against Josh Thomson at Strikeforce: Triple Threat. He lost via unanimous decision, however, and was also defeated in his next, and last, Strikeforce fight against Billy Evangelista at Strikeforce: Melendez vs. Thomson.

He then won the Extreme Fighters World Championships by defeating Shad Smith via TKO at 1:11 of the first round on October 6, 2007.

In 2009, he took part in the Sengoku Raiden Championship's Featherweight Grand Prix where he defeated Hideki Kadowaki in the opening round. In the second round, at Sengoku 8, Phan was defeated by Michihiro Omigawa.

=== The Ultimate Fighter ===
Phan signed with the Ultimate Fighting Championship to appear on The Ultimate Fighter: Team GSP vs. Team Koscheck. On the debut episode, Phan defeated Mike Budnik via TKO after a liver shot and follow-up punches. Phan therefore earned entrance into the house, where he would be picked for Team Koscheck as Koscheck's fifth pick (ninth overall).

In the preliminary fight, Phan fought Spencer Paige, winning via unanimous decision to give Koscheck's team their first win. The first round was closely contested until the final seconds where Phan got a takedown, ground and pounded, and then applied a kimura. In between rounds, Paige told his corner that his left foot was broken. Phan would go on to continue pressuring Paige in the second round to win the fight.

For his quarter-final fight, Phan was selected to fight Cody McKenzie. Phan defeated McKenzie via TKO (punches) in round 2, securing his spot in the semi-finals. In the semi-final round, Phan faced Michael Johnson. In a back-and-forth fight, Johnson scored takedowns. The consensus at the fight was that Johnson won the opening round, whilst Phan won the second. The third round, however, was argued over, with the coach of each respective fighter believing that their fighter took it. Johnson was declared the winner via split decision.

=== Ultimate Fighting Championship ===
Phan was expected to face Alex Caceres on December 4, 2010, at The Ultimate Fighter: Team GSP vs. Team Koscheck Finale. However, Caceres was forced out of the bout with an injury and replaced by Leonard Garcia. Phan lost the fight against Garcia via a controversial split decision. Due to the controversy surrounding the decision, both fighters were awarded a win bonus by the UFC and the fight earned Fight of the Night honors. The loss was named as 2010 Robbery of the Year by many MMA websites, most notably by Sherdog.com.

A rematch with Garcia was expected on March 26, 2011, at UFC Fight Night 24. However, Phan was forced out of the bout with an injury and was replaced by Chan Sung Jung.

Phan faced Mike Brown on August 6, 2011, at UFC 133. He lost the fight via unanimous decision.

Phan was expected to face Matt Grice on October 8, 2011, at UFC 136, replacing an injured Josh Grispi. However, Grice was forced out of the bout with an injury with Leonard Garcia stepping in to replace him. Phan won via unanimous decision, also earning both fighters Fight of the Night bonuses.

Phan next faced Jimy Hettes on December 30, 2011, at UFC 141. Phan was dominated by Hettes throughout the fight, unable to stop the many takedowns of his opponent and losing via unanimous decision.

Phan was briefly linked to a bout with Zhang Tie Quan on February 26, 2012, at UFC 144. However, for unknown reasons, the bout never materialized.

Phan faced Cole Miller on August 4, 2012, at UFC on FOX 4 and won a split decision.

Phan faced Dennis Siver on December 8, 2012, at UFC on Fox 5, replacing an injured Eddie Yagin. Nam went into the fight with a passive posture, and proceeded to be dominated through the entire three rounds in both stand up and ground games, ultimately losing by unanimous decision. One of the judges scored 10-8 in favor of Siver on all three rounds.

Phan fought Takeya Mizugaki in a Bantamweight bout on December 7, 2013, at UFC Fight Night 33. He lost the fight via unanimous decision.

Phan faced Vaughan Lee on March 1, 2014, at The Ultimate Fighter: China Finale. He lost the fight via unanimous decision and was subsequently released from the promotion.

=== Post-UFC career ===
In his first fight post-UFC, Phan faced Kenichi Ito at Grandslam MMA: Way of the Cage on July 13, 2014. He won the fight via first-round TKO.

Phan then faced Yuki Baba at Pancrase 261 on October 5, 2014. Phan won the fight via rear-naked choke submission in the first round.

=== Bellator MMA ===
On October 17, 2014, it was announced that Phan has signed with Bellator. He made his debut for the promotion against Mike Richman on November 15, 2014, at Bellator 131. Phan lost the fight via knockout in the first round.

=== Retirement ===
On March 12, 2017, after his loss to Whiteford, Phan announced his retirement from MMA competition.

== Boxing ==
Nam Phan is currently on a 7 fight losing streak with a record of 3 wins 8 losses and 1 draw.

== Personal life ==
Phan takes pride in his Vietnamese heritage and is part of the Vietnamese-American community. He proudly displays both the American and South Vietnamese flags on his gi as a symbol of his pride in the freedom of his current home and of his lost homeland. Phan owns and runs the Madu Academy, where he teaches Brazilian jiu-jitsu as well as boxing and Muay Thai. In 2005, Phan co-founded Ma Du Entertainment, a business to promote mixed martial arts fighters.

== Championships and accomplishments ==
- Ultimate Fighting Championship
  - Fight of the Night (Two times) vs. Leonard Garcia
- Pancrase Hybrid Wrestling
  - King of Pancrase Featherweight Championship (1 Time)

== Mixed martial arts record ==
Professional record breakdown
38 matches	21 wins	17 losses
By knockout	8	4
By submission	6	3
By decision	7	10

Res.	Record	Opponent	Method	Event	Date	Round	Time	Location	Notes
Loss	21–17	Robert Whiteford	Technical Submission (front choke)	ACB 54: Supersonic	March 11, 2017	1	0:29	Manchester, England	
Loss	21–16	Masakazu Imanari	Submission (heel hook)	DEEP Cage Impact 2016	April 23, 2016	1	0:35	Tokyo, Japan	
Loss	21–15	Andy Main	Submission (triangle choke)	Pancrase 270	October 4, 2015	4	3:41	Tokyo, Japan	Lost the Pancrase Featherweight Championship.
Win	21–14	Takumi Nakayama	Decision (split)	Pancrase 264	January 31, 2015	3	5:00	Tokyo, Japan	Won the Pancrase Featherweight Championship.
Loss	20–14	Mike Richman	KO (punches)	Bellator 131	November 15, 2014	1	0:46	San Diego, California, United States	
Win	20–13	Yuki Baba	Submission (rear-naked choke)	Pancrase 261	October 5, 2014	1	4:05	Tokyo, Japan	
Win	19–13	Kenichi Ito	TKO (punches)	Grandslam MMA: Way of the Cage	July 13, 2014	1	4:27	Tokyo, Japan	
Loss	18–13	Vaughan Lee	Decision (unanimous)	The Ultimate Fighter China Finale: Kim vs. Hathaway	March 1, 2014	3	5:00	Macau, SAR, China	
Loss	18–12	Takeya Mizugaki	Decision (unanimous)	UFC Fight Night: Hunt vs. Bigfoot	December 7, 2013	3	5:00	Brisbane, Queensland, Australia	Bantamweight debut.
Loss	18–11	Dennis Siver	Decision (unanimous)	UFC on Fox: Henderson vs. Diaz	December 8, 2012	3	5:00	Seattle, Washington, United States	
Win	18–10	Cole Miller	Decision (split)	UFC on Fox: Shogun vs. Vera	August 4, 2012	3	5:00	Los Angeles, California, United States	
Loss	17–10	Jimy Hettes	Decision (unanimous)	UFC 141	December 30, 2011	3	5:00	Las Vegas, Nevada, United States	
Win	17–9	Leonard Garcia	Decision (unanimous)	UFC 136	October 8, 2011	3	5:00	Houston, Texas, United States	Fight of the Night.
Loss	16–9	Mike Brown	Decision (unanimous)	UFC 133	August 6, 2011	3	5:00	Philadelphia, Pennsylvania, United States	
Loss	16–8	Leonard Garcia	Decision (split)	The Ultimate Fighter: Team GSP vs. Team Koscheck Finale	December 4, 2010	3	5:00	Las Vegas, Nevada, United States	Fight of the Night.
Win	16–7	Rodney Rhoden	Submission (armbar)	Civic Disobedience 2	April 3, 2010	1	3:20	Los Angeles, California, United States	
Loss	15–7	Isaac DeJesus	TKO (punches)	TPF 3: Champions Collide	February 4, 2010	1	2:55	Lemoore, California, United States	For Tachi Palace Fights Featherweight Championship
Loss	15–6	Michihiro Omigawa	TKO (punches)	World Victory Road Presents: Sengoku 8	May 2, 2009	1	4:52	Tokyo, Japan	Featherweight Grand Prix Second Round
Win	15–5	Hideki Kadowaki	TKO (punches)	World Victory Road Presents: Sengoku 7	March 20, 2009	1	3:09	Tokyo, Japan	Featherweight Grand Prix Opening Round
Loss	14–5	Billy Evangelista	Decision (split)	Strikeforce: Melendez vs. Thomson	June 27, 2008	3	5:00	San Jose, California, United States	
Win	14–4	Saad Awad	TKO (punches)	GC 74: Evolution	February 16, 2008	2	0:52	Los Angeles, California, United States	
Win	13–4	Shad Smith	TKO (punches)	EFWC: The Untamed	October 6, 2007	1	1:11	Anaheim, California, United States	
Loss	12–4	Gesias Cavalcante	TKO (punches)	Dynamite!! USA	June 2, 2007	1	0:26	Los Angeles, California, United States	
Loss	12–3	Josh Thomson	Decision (unanimous)	Strikeforce: Triple Threat	December 8, 2006	3	5:00	San Jose, California, United States	For the Strikeforce Lightweight Championship.
Win	12–2	Aric Nelson	TKO (punches)	FCP: Malice at Cow Palace	September 9, 2006	2	4:11	San Jacinto, California, United States	
Win	11–2	Ryan Diaz	Decision (split)	KOTC: Rapid Fire	August 4, 2006	2	5:00	San Jacinto, California, United States	
Win	10–2	Albert Hill	Submission (armbar)	KOTC 63: Final Conflict	December 2, 2005	1	0:12	San Jacinto, California, United States	
Win	9–2	Joe Frainee	Submission (armbar)	KOTC 58: Prime Time	August 5, 2005	1	3:28	San Jacinto, California, United States	
Win	8–2	Sost Infante	TKO (cut)	KOTC 54: Mucho Machismo	June 12, 2005	1	0:51	San Jacinto, California, United States	
Win	7–2	Joey Alvarado	KO (punches)	KOTC 49: Soboba	March 20, 2005	1	1:08	San Jacinto, California, United States	
Win	6–2	Mike Valdez	Submission (triangle choke)	KOTC 47: Uprising	February 5, 2005	1	0:41	Lemoore, California, United States	
Loss	5–2	Nick Ertl	Decision (split)	WEC 11	August 20, 2004	3	5:00	Upland, California, United States	
Win	5–1	Eben Kaneshiro	Decision (unanimous)	Pit Fighting Championship	February 7, 2004	3	5:00	Upland, California, United States	
Loss	4–1	Rob McCullough	Decision (unanimous)	PFC: Knucklefest	April 5, 2003	2	5:00	California, United States	
Win	4–0	Patrick Hoang	Decision (unanimous)	PFC: Knucklefest	April 5, 2003	1	5:00	California, United States	
Win	3–0	Brad Levy	Decision (split)	PFC: Knucklefest	April 5, 2003	1	5:00	California, United States	
Win	2–0	Brad McCall	Submission (guillotine choke)	California Pancration Championships	June 11, 2002	2	0:42	Los Angeles, California, United States	
Win	1–0	Jason Maxwell	TKO (punches)	Cobra Classic 2001	October 6, 2001	2	N/A	Anza, California, United States	

== See also ==
- List of male mixed martial artists
