= Luke Rockhold =

American mixed martial artist (born 1984)

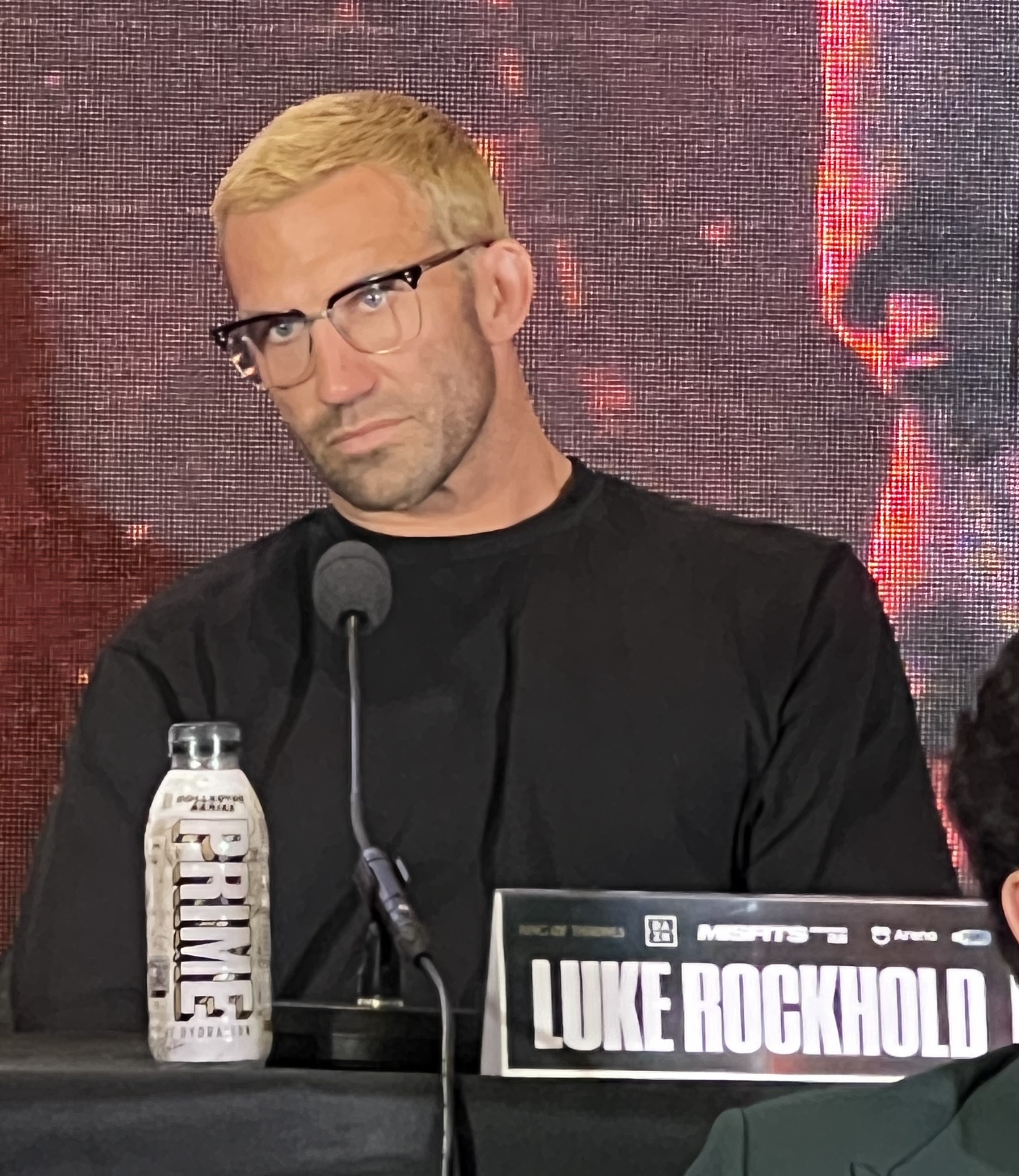
- Luke Rockhold at the Misfits 22 press conference in July 2025
- Born: Luke Skyler Rockhold; October 17, 1984 (age 42); Santa Cruz, California, U.S.
- Height: 6 ft 3 in (1.91 m)
- Weight: 185 lb (84 kg; 13.2 st)
- Division: Middleweight (2007–2018, 2022); Light Heavyweight (2019)
- Reach: 77 in (196 cm)
- Style: Brazilian Jiu-Jitsu
- Stance: Southpaw
- Fighting out of: San Jose, California, U.S.
- Team: American Kickboxing Academy; RVCA Training Center; Sanford MMA
- Trainer: Javier Mendez; Henri Hooft; Jason Parillo
- Rank: 1st degree black belt in Brazilian Jiu-Jitsu under Leandro Vieira and Dave Camarillo
- Years active: 2007–present

Mixed martial arts record
- Total: 22
- Wins: 16
- By knockout: 6
- By submission: 8
- By decision: 2
- Losses: 6
- By knockout: 5
- By decision: 1

Other information
- Mixed martial arts record from Sherdog

Luke Rockhold
Medal record

Representing United States

Brazilian Jiu-Jitsu

World No-Gi Jiu-Jitsu Championship
Gold medal – first place	2007 Long Beach	91.5kg

World Jiu-Jitsu Championship
Gold medal – first place	2007 Long Beach	94.3kg

Pan American Jiu-Jitsu Championship
Silver medal – second place	2006 Long Beach	88.3kg

Luke Skyler Rockhold (born October 17, 1984) is an American former mixed martial artist who is currently signed with Bare Knuckle Fighting Championship and Karate Combat. He formerly competed for the Ultimate Fighting Championship (UFC), where he is a former UFC Middleweight Champion. Rockhold has also competed for Strikeforce, where he was the final Strikeforce Middleweight Champion before the promotion merged with the UFC.

== Background ==
Rockhold was born on October 17, 1984, in Santa Cruz, California, into an athletic family. Growing up, Luke and his older brother, pro-surfer Matt Rockhold, surfed their local breaks together. His father was a professional basketball player in Europe and his mother was an avid tennis player. Luke started training in judo when he was 6 years old but quit upon turning ten. When he entered the seventh grade, he joined his school's wrestling team and stuck with the sport all throughout his time at Soquel High School while taking jiu-jitsu classes. Rockhold's great grandfather was a full blood Native American. He is also of German, Irish and English descent.

Rockhold tried wrestling for a local community college but decided to take jiu-jitsu on full-time. After winning a few BJJ tournaments, he decided to enter mixed martial arts. In 2006, a friend invited Rockhold to train at the American Kickboxing Academy (AKA) in San Jose, California.

== Mixed martial arts career ==
=== Strikeforce ===
Up-and-coming promotion Strikeforce called and offered Rockhold a fight on their Strikeforce: Young Guns II card. Rockhold looked impressive in his debut, forcing his opponent to submit from punches. Impressed with his performance, Strikeforce decided to give him another fight. The second fight took place on the Strikeforce: Destruction card, which Rockhold won via submission. At Strikeforce: Shamrock vs. Diaz, Rockhold won his third consecutive fight. Rockhold was given a step up in competition when he fought Cory Devela at Strikeforce Challengers: Villasenor vs. Cyborg. Even though he was the underdog going into the fight, he won that fight in just 30 seconds with his third rear-naked choke submission in a row.

At Strikeforce Challengers: Gurgel vs. Evangelista, Rockhold defeated The Ultimate Fighter 7 contestant, Jesse Taylor. The fight improved his record to 5–0 under the Strikeforce banner. In February 2010, Rockhold defeated another Ultimate Fighter 7 finalist, Paul Bradley, and won via TKO (knees to the body). The fight took place at Strikeforce Challengers: Kaufman vs. Hashi in San Jose, California. With the win, Rockhold hoped to fight against tougher and well-known fighters. In addition to the win, Rockhold was announced as a playable character for the EA Sports MMA video game. Rockhold was scheduled to fight Matt Lindland at Strikeforce: San Jose but pulled out a few weeks before the fight due to a shoulder injury. Rockhold was expected to face former title contender, Tim Kennedy, at Strikeforce 32; however, for unknown reasons, Rockhold was removed from the bout.

==== Winning the middleweight title ====
After more than a year and a half hiatus from fighting due to injuries, Rockhold stepped into the cage to fight Strikeforce Middleweight champion Ronaldo Souza on September 10, 2011. He won the fight via unanimous decision (50–45, 48–47, and 48–47) to become the new Strikeforce Middleweight champion. For his first title defense, Rockhold faced Keith Jardine at Strikeforce: Rockhold vs. Jardine on January 7, 2012. Rockhold won the fight via TKO in the first round.

In his second title defense, Rockhold faced Tim Kennedy in the main event of Strikeforce: Rockhold vs. Kennedy on July 14, 2012. During the weigh-ins for the bout on July 13, Rockhold came in a half-pound overweight. Rockhold cut the extra weight in the allotted two-hour limit. He successfully defended his title for a second time, winning the fight via unanimous decision (49–46, 49–46, and 49–46).

For his third title defense, Rockhold was expected to face challenger Lorenz Larkin at Strikeforce: Cormier vs. Mir on November 3, 2012, in Oklahoma City, Oklahoma. However, Rockhold was forced to withdraw from the show due to injury and the event was later cancelled. The fight was rumored to be rescheduled on January 12, 2013. However, Rockhold never agreed to the bout, citing a lingering shoulder injury.

=== Ultimate Fighting Championship ===
In January 2013, the Strikeforce organization was closed by its parent company Zuffa. A list of fighters scheduled to be brought over to the Ultimate Fighting Championship was released in mid-January and Rockhold was one of the fighters listed.

Rockhold faced perennial multi-divisional contender Vitor Belfort on May 18, 2013, in the main event at UFC on FX 8. He lost the fight via knockout in the first round, after being caught with a spinning heel kick to the face.

Rockhold was expected to face Tim Boetsch on October 19, 2013, at UFC 166. However, Rockhold was forced out of the bout, citing a knee injury, and he was replaced by C.B. Dollaway. Rockhold faced Costas Philippou on January 15, 2014, at UFC Fight Night 35. He won via TKO in the first round after dropping Philippou with a kick to the body. The performance also earned Rockhold a $50,000 Knockout of the Night bonus. Rockhold eventually faced Tim Boetsch on April 26, 2014, at UFC 172. He won the fight via submission in the first round.

Rockhold faced Michael Bisping on November 8, 2014, at UFC Fight Night 55. He won the fight in the second round, after dropping Bisping with a head kick and then applying a guillotine choke submission. The win earned Rockhold his first Performance of the Night bonus award.

On April 18, 2015, Rockhold faced former UFC Light Heavyweight Champion Lyoto Machida at UFC on Fox 15. Rockhold defeated Machida in a one-sided fight via submission in the second round. Rockhold also earned his second consecutive Performance of the Night bonus award.

==== Winning the UFC middleweight title ====
It's a bad fight for Chris, stylistically. Luke is really hard to take down, and when you get him down his Jiu Jitsu is amazing. It's one of the best and underrated offensive Jiu Jitsu games in MMA. [Luke] has the range, he has the height, he has the size, he has the power ...

— Tim Kennedy discussing Weidman-Rockhold fight

Rockhold next faced Chris Weidman for the UFC Middleweight Championship on December 12, 2015, at UFC 194. Rockhold won by technical knockout in the fourth round and became the 7th middleweight champion in UFC history. Both participants were awarded Fight of the Night honors. In the post-fight interview, Rockhold illuminated his struggles prior to the fight: he had been battling a staph infection and was on antibiotics, which made him exhausted during the later rounds of the fight. Being a Santa Cruz native and becoming the UFC Middleweight Champion, his hometown Santa Cruz, California, proclaimed December 18, as Luke Rockhold Day crediting his victory and achievements.

==== Post championship ====
A rematch with Weidman was scheduled to take place on June 4, 2016, at UFC 199. However, Weidman pulled out of the fight on May 17 with a cervical disc herniation, and he was replaced by Michael Bisping. His title match against Bisping ended in the first round when Rockhold was dropped with a left hook and finished with a flurry of punches against the cage. This result was considered by many in MMA media as one of the biggest upsets in the UFC title fight history, Bisping being a huge underdog because he took the fight in only 10 days and had been submitted by Rockhold 18 months earlier.

Rockhold was expected to face Ronaldo Souza in a rematch on November 27, 2016, at UFC Fight Night 101. However, the pairing was cancelled on November 1, after Rockhold was ruled out of the contest after sustaining an undisclosed injury. As a result, Souza was also removed from the card.

Rockhold faced former two-time WSOF champion David Branch on September 16, 2017, at UFC Fight Night 116 after being away from the sport for almost 15 months due to injuries. He won the fight by forcing Branch to tap out from his punches in the second round.

Rockhold was scheduled to fight on February 10, 2018, at UFC 221 against UFC Middleweight Champion Robert Whittaker. On January 13, 2018, it was reported that Whittaker pulled out from his bout against Rockhold at UFC 221 due to a serious condition of staph infection. He was replaced by Yoel Romero in a bout for the Interim UFC Middleweight Championship. The winner of this bout would then face Whittaker for a title unification bout. At the UFC 221 weigh-ins, Romero weighed in at 187.7 pounds, 2.7 pounds over the middleweight championship limit of 185.0 pounds. As a result, Romero was ineligible to win the championship even if he won the fight, while Rockhold would have received the Interim Championship if he had won. Romero was also fined 30% of his purse, which went to Rockhold. After a slow start, Romero knocked Rockhold out in the third round.

Rockhold was briefly linked to a light heavyweight bout with Alexander Gustafsson on August 4, 2018, at UFC 227. However, Rockhold later re-injured his leg in training and the fight was scuttled.

A rematch with Chris Weidman was expected to take place on November 3, 2018, at UFC 230. However, on October 19, 2018, it was reported Rockhold withdrew from the bout, citing an injury, and he was replaced by Ronaldo Souza.

==== Move to light heavyweight ====
In December 2018, Rockhold announced he will be moving up to light heavyweight due to ever-increasingly harder weight cuts that have led to numerous injuries during training. Rockhold's light heavyweight debut took place against Jan Błachowicz on July 6, 2019, at UFC 239. Rockhold lost the fight via knockout in the second round.

==== 2021 and beyond ====
After a two year lay off, Rockhold was expected to face Sean Strickland in a middleweight bout on November 6, 2021, at UFC 268. However, on October 11 Rockhold withdrew due to a herniated disc.

Rockhold was scheduled to face Paulo Costa on July 30, 2022, at UFC 277. However, the bout was postponed to August 20, at UFC 278. Rockhold lost the fight via unanimous decision. The fight earned him the Fight of the Night award. Rockhold retired from mixed martial arts after the fight. Although Rockhold retired from MMA competition, he has been vocal about his interest in pursuing a career in boxing.

In January 2023, Rockhold announced that he had negotiated a release from his UFC contract and would come out of retirement to compete for another MMA organization.

=== Hardcore FC Fight Show ===
Luke Rockhold and Tyron Woodley coached a group of fighters in a Hardcore FC Fight Show reality TV series for Hardcore FC promotion which was filmed in the United Arab Emirates during April and May 2024.

==== Global Fight League ====
On December 11, 2024, it was announced that Rockhold was signed by Global Fight League.

In the company's first announced bout, Rockhold was scheduled to face Chris Weidman in a rematch at a to be announced date and location. However, in April 2025, it was reported that all GFL events were cancelled indefinitely.

== Career in other combat sports ==
=== Professional grappling ===
Rockhold competed against Nick Rodriguez at Polaris 12 on November 30, 2019, where he lost a unanimous decision.

Rockhold was scheduled to face Craig Jones in a grappling match at Israel Fight Night on September 21, 2023, but the event was cancelled.

Rockhold competed in the over 80 kg division of the inaugural Craig Jones Invitational on August 16 and 17, 2024. He lost to Pat Downey by decision in the opening round.

=== Bare Knuckle Fighting Championship ===
On March 1, 2023, BKFC president Dave Feldman announced that Rockhold had signed with Bare Knuckle Fighting Championship. He made his debut against Mike Perry at BKFC 41 on April 29, 2023, and retired during the fight, losing by technical knockout.

=== Karate Combat ===
Rockhold made his Karate Combat debut by facing Joe Schilling on April 20, 2024 at Karate Combat 45 in Dubai in a 195 pound catchweight bout. He won the bout by a right hook knockout in the third round.

=== Boxing ===
On July 16, Rockhold announced his MF–professional boxing debut against English mixed martial artist Darren Till, headlining Misfits 22 – Ring of Thrones. The bout took place on August 30 at the Manchester Arena in Manchester, England for the inaugural inhouse bridgerweight title.

Rockhold lost the bout via KO in the third round. He was dropped 3 times throughout the bout, once in the final ten seconds of round 1, again in round 2, although it went uncalled by the ref, and he was dropped for a third time in round 3, being knocked completely unconscious.

=== Freestyle wrestling ===
Rockhold is scheduled to face Joe Pyfer on September 19, 2026 at RAF 13.

== Other ventures ==
=== Modeling career ===
Rockhold signed up for the New York model management agency, Soul Artist Management, the same agency that found fellow UFC fighter Alan Jouban and jump started the career of Channing Tatum. Luke has since had his first spread released as a professional model. With his modeling career quickly picking up steam, he revealed that he would have no problem taking an indefinite hiatus from the Octagon in order to pursue his newly found modeling career. He has also modeled at the New York Fashion Week.

=== Face of Ralph Lauren cologne ===
In 2018 Rockhold became the new face of Ralph Lauren's "Polo Blue" cologne fragrance.

=== The Millionaire Matchmaker reality show ===
Rockhold was featured as a guest on The Millionaire Matchmaker reality show on Bravo TV in 2015. On the show he dated mixologist, Kara. Rockhold departed the show after asking Kara an inappropriate question. He defended himself by saying that the comment was a scripted joke and that the editor dubbed it in the scene later on.

== Personal life ==
Rockhold dated singer and actor Demi Lovato for a few months in late 2016. The duo made their first public appearance while attending UFC 205 together, at Madison Square Garden in New York. They split in January 2017.

In February 2022, a girlfriend of Rockhold's had an abortion, and they subsequently broke up.

Rockhold is an avid surfer, skateboarder, and a professional model, having modeled at the New York Fashion Week and as the face of Ralph Lauren's "Polo Blue" fragrance.

== Championships and accomplishments ==
=== Mixed martial arts ===
- Ultimate Fighting Championship
  - UFC Middleweight Championship (One time)
  - Fight of the Night (Two times) vs. Chris Weidman and Paulo Costa
  - Knockout of the Night (One time) vs. Costas Philippou
  - Performance of the Night (Two times) vs. Michael Bisping 1 and Lyoto Machida
  - UFC.com Awards
    - 2014: Ranked #6 Fighter of the Year & Ranked #4 Submission of the Year vs. Tim Boetsch
    - 2015: Ranked #6 Fighter of the Year
- Strikeforce
  - Strikeforce Middleweight Championship (One time; final)
    - Two successful title defenses
  - Tied most finishes in Strikeforce history (7)
  - Most submissions in Strikeforce history (5)
- Sherdog
  - 2015 All-Violence First Team
  - 2014 Submission of the Year vs. Tim Boetsch
  - 2014 All-Violence First Team
- Fight Matrix
  - 2015 Upset of the Year vs. Chris Weidman
  - 2015 Most Noteworthy Match of the Year vs. Chris Weidman
- Bleacher Report
  - 2014 #7 Ranked Fighter of the Year

=== Brazilian Jiu-Jitsu ===
- International Brazilian Jiu-Jitsu Federation
  - 2007 IBJJF World Jiu-Jitsu Championships Purple Belt No-Gi Gold Medalist
  - 2007 IBJJF World Jiu-Jitsu Championships Blue Belt Gold Medalist
  - 2006 IBJJF Pan American Championships Blue Belt Silver Medalist

== Mixed martial arts record ==
Professional record breakdown
22 matches	16 wins	6 losses
By knockout	6	5
By submission	8	0
By decision	2	1

Res.	Record	Opponent	Method	Event	Date	Round	Time	Location	Notes
Loss	16–6	Paulo Costa	Decision (unanimous)	UFC 278	August 20, 2022	3	5:00	Salt Lake City, Utah, United States	Return to Middleweight. Fight of the Night.
Loss	16–5	Jan Błachowicz	KO (punches)	UFC 239	July 6, 2019	2	1:39	Las Vegas, Nevada, United States	Light Heavyweight debut.
Loss	16–4	Yoel Romero	KO (punches)	UFC 221	February 10, 2018	3	1:48	Perth, Western Australia, Australia	For the interim UFC Middleweight Championship. Romero missed weight (187.7 lb) and was ineligible to win the title.
Win	16–3	David Branch	TKO (submission to punches)	UFC Fight Night: Rockhold vs. Branch	September 16, 2017	2	4:04	Pittsburgh, Pennsylvania, United States	
Loss	15–3	Michael Bisping	KO (punches)	UFC 199	June 4, 2016	1	3:36	Inglewood, California, United States	Lost the UFC Middleweight Championship.
Win	15–2	Chris Weidman	TKO (punches)	UFC 194	December 12, 2015	4	3:12	Las Vegas, Nevada, United States	Won the UFC Middleweight Championship. Fight of the Night.
Win	14–2	Lyoto Machida	Submission (rear-naked choke)	UFC on Fox: Machida vs. Rockhold	April 18, 2015	2	2:31	Newark, New Jersey, United States	Performance of the Night.
Win	13–2	Michael Bisping	Submission (guillotine choke)	UFC Fight Night: Rockhold vs. Bisping	November 8, 2014	2	0:57	Sydney, Australia	Performance of the Night.
Win	12–2	Tim Boetsch	Submission (inverted triangle kimura)	UFC 172	April 26, 2014	1	2:08	Baltimore, Maryland, United States	
Win	11–2	Costas Philippou	KO (body kick)	UFC Fight Night: Rockhold vs. Philippou	January 15, 2014	1	2:31	Duluth, Georgia, United States	Knockout of the Night.
Loss	10–2	Vitor Belfort	KO (spinning heel kick and punches)	UFC on FX: Belfort vs. Rockhold	May 18, 2013	1	2:32	Jaraguá do Sul, Brazil	
Win	10–1	Tim Kennedy	Decision (unanimous)	Strikeforce: Rockhold vs. Kennedy	July 14, 2012	5	5:00	Portland, Oregon, United States	Defended the Strikeforce Middleweight Championship. Broke the record for the most consecutive Strikeforce Middleweight Championship title defenses (2).
Win	9–1	Keith Jardine	TKO (punches)	Strikeforce: Rockhold vs. Jardine	January 7, 2012	1	4:26	Paradise, Nevada, United States	Defended the Strikeforce Middleweight Championship.
Win	8–1	Ronaldo Souza	Decision (unanimous)	Strikeforce: Barnett vs. Kharitonov	September 10, 2011	5	5:00	Cincinnati, Ohio, United States	Won the Strikeforce Middleweight Championship.
Win	7–1	Paul Bradley	TKO (knees to the body)	Strikeforce Challengers: Kaufman vs. Hashi	February 26, 2010	1	2:24	San Jose, California, United States	
Win	6–1	Jesse Taylor	Submission (rear-naked choke)	Strikeforce Challengers: Gurgel vs. Evangelista	November 6, 2009	1	3:42	Fresno, California, United States	
Win	5–1	Cory Devela	Submission (rear-naked choke)	Strikeforce Challengers: Villasenor vs. Cyborg	June 19, 2009	1	0:30	Kent, Washington, United States	
Win	4–1	Buck Meredith	Submission (rear-naked choke)	Strikeforce: Shamrock vs. Diaz	April 11, 2009	1	4:07	San Jose, California, United States	
Win	3–1	Nik Theotikos	Submission (rear-naked choke)	Strikeforce: Destruction	November 21, 2008	1	3:06	San Jose, California, United States	
Win	2–1	Josh Neal	TKO (submission to punches)	Strikeforce: Young Guns II	February 1, 2008	1	1:49	San Jose, California, United States	
Loss	1–1	Tony Rubalcava	TKO (punches)	Melee on the Mountain	November 6, 2007	1	2:46	Friant, California, United States	
Win	1–0	Mike Martinez	Submission (armbar)	Melee on the Mountain	July 24, 2007	1	2:44	Friant, California, United States	

== Bare knuckle record ==
Professional record breakdown
1 match	0 wins	1 loss
By knockout	0	1

Res.	Record	Opponent	Method	Event	Date	Round	Time	Location	Notes
Loss	0–1	Mike Perry	TKO (retirement)	BKFC 41	April 29, 2023	2	1:15	Broomfield, Colorado, United States	

== Karate Combat record ==
Professional record breakdown
1 match	1 win	0 losses
By knockout	1	0

Res.	Record	Opponent	Method	Event	Date	Round	Time	Location	Notes
Win	1–0	Joe Schilling	TKO (punches)	Karate Combat 45	April 20, 2024	3	1:43	Dubai, United Arab Emirates	

== Boxing record ==
1 fight	0 wins	1 loss
By knockout	0	1

No.	Res.	Record	Opponent	Type	Round, Time	Date	Location	Notes
1	Loss	0–1	Darren Till	KO	3 (6), 1:01	30 Aug 2025	Manchester Arena, Manchester, England	For inaugural MFB bridgerweight title

== Freestyle wrestling record ==
Freestyle matches
Res.	Record	Opponent	Score	Date	Event	Location
Loss	0–1	(United States) Joe Pyfer	TF 3–14	September 18, 2026	RAF 13	(United States) Miami, Florida

== Pay-per-view bouts ==
=== MMA ===
No.	Event	Fight	Date	City	Venue	PPV Buys
1.	UFC 199	Rockhold vs. Bisping 2	June 4, 2016	Inglewood, California, United States	Kia Forum	283,000
2.	UFC 221	Romero vs. Rockhold	February 11, 2018	Perth, Western Australia, Australia	Perth Arena	130,000

=== Bare knuckle Boxing ===
No.	Event	Fight	Date	City	Venue	PPV Buys
1.	BKFC 41	Perry vs. Rockhold	April 29, 2023	Broomfield, Colorado, United States	1stBank Center	TBA

=== Boxing ===
No.	Date	Fight	Billing	Network	Buys	Revenue	Source(s)
1	30 August 2025	Till vs Rockhold	Ring of Thrones	DAZN	Upcoming		
Total

== See also ==
- List of Strikeforce alumni
- List of male mixed martial artists

Achievements
Preceded by Ronaldo Souza	5th Strikeforce Middleweight Champion; September 10, 2011 – January 12, 2013	Strikeforce banner dissolved into UFC
Preceded by Chris Weidman	7th UFC Middleweight Champion; December 12, 2015 – June 4, 2016	Succeeded by Michael Bisping
