= Strikeforce: Feijao vs. Henderson =

Strikeforce mixed martial arts event in 2011

- The poster for Strikeforce: Feijao vs. Henderson
- Promotion: Strikeforce
- Date: March 5, 2011
- Venue: Nationwide Arena
- City: Columbus, Ohio, United States
- Attendance: 7,123

Event chronology
Strikeforce: Fedor vs. Silva	Strikeforce: Feijao vs. Henderson	Strikeforce: Diaz vs. Daley

Strikeforce: Feijao vs. Henderson, was a mixed martial arts event held by Strikeforce. It took place on March 5, 2011 at the Nationwide Arena in Columbus, Ohio, United States. The event was the first that the organization has hosted in the state of Ohio and coincided with the Arnold Sports Festival, which annually draws up to 150,000 sports fans.

== Background ==
A rubber-match between Tim Kennedy and Jason Miller was expected for this event. However, Miller was pulled from the card for unknown reasons, and was replaced with Luke Rockhold. Only a few days after announcing the Rockhold/Kennedy match-up, it was reported that Rockhold had been removed and was replaced with Melvin Manhoef. The Kennedy/Rockhold match would later headline Strikeforce: Rockhold vs. Kennedy in July 2012, where Rockhold defended his then-Strikeforce Middleweight Championship by unanimous decision.

Jessica Eye was scheduled to make her Strikeforce debut at this event against former title contender Jan Finney, but the two could not agree upon a fight weight so the fight was called off.

Marloes Coenen was originally set to defend her title against number one contender Miesha Tate at this event, but on February 23, it was announced that Tate had to withdraw from the contest and her replacement would be Liz Carmouche. The Coenen/Tate bout was rescheduled for Strikeforce: Fedor vs. Henderson on July 30, where Tate won the title via fourth round submission.

Jorge Gurgel was originally set to fight promotional newcomer Tyler Combs at this event, but Combs injured himself five days before the event and had to withdraw from the bout. Billy Vaughan stepped in as his replacement.

Strikeforce Challengers commentator Pat Miletich filled in for Gus Johnson on the live broadcast of this event, as Johnson was calling an NCAA basketball game that night. Miletich would later permanently replace Johnson for Strikeforce's main events that fall.

This was the last Strikeforce event held during Silicon Valley Sports and Entertainment's ownership of the promotion. Zuffa, LLC announced their purchase of Strikeforce the following week.

The event drew average viewing TV audience of 412,000.

== Results ==
Main card
Weight class				Method	Round	Time	Notes
Light Heavyweight	Dan Henderson	def.	Rafael Cavalcante (c)	TKO (punches)	3	0:50	(Note: For the Strikeforce Light Heavyweight Championship.)
Women's Bantamweight	Marloes Coenen (c)	def.	Liz Carmouche	Submission (triangle choke)	4	1:29	(Note: For the Strikeforce Women's Bantamweight Championship.)
Middleweight	Tim Kennedy	def.	Melvin Manhoef	Submission (rear-naked choke)	1	3:41
Lightweight	Jorge Masvidal	def.	Billy Evangelista	Decision (unanimous) (30–27, 30–27, 30–27)	3	5:00
Preliminary card
Lightweight	Jorge Gurgel	def.	Billy Vaughan	Submission (guillotine choke)	1	0:44
Welterweight	John Kuhner	def.	J.P. Felty	Submission (triangle choke)	2	4:31
Middleweight	Mitch Whitesel	def.	Marc Cofer	Submission (guillotine choke)	1	3:55
Middleweight	Brian Rogers	def.	Ian Rammel	TKO (strikes)	1	4:23
Heavyweight	Jason Freeman	def.	Jason Riley	TKO (Submission to strikes)	1	1:52
Welterweight	Roger Bowling	def.	Josh Thornburg	Decision (unanimous) (30–27, 30–27, 30–27)	3	5:00

== Reported payout ==
The following is the reported payout to the fighters.

- Dan Henderson: $250,000 (no win bonus) def. Rafael Cavalcante: $28,000
- Marloes Coenen: $10,000 (no win bonus) def. Liz Carmouche: $5,000
- Tim Kennedy: $50,000 (no win bonus) def. Melvin Manhoef: $10,000
- Jorge Masvidal: $30,000 (including $15,000 win bonus) def. Billy Evangelista: $20,000
- Roger Bowling: $7,000 (includes $3,500 win bonus) def. Josh Thornburg: $2,000
- Jorge Gurgel: $8,000 (includes $4,000 win bonus) def. Billy Vaughan: $1,500
- Jay Freeman: $3,000 (includes $1,500 win bonus) def. Jason Riley: $1,500
- Brian Rogers: $3,000 (includes $1,500 win bonus) def. Ian Rammel: $1,500
- Mitch Whitesel: $3,000 (includes $1,500 win bonus) def. Marc Cofer: $1,500
- John Kuhner: $3,000 (includes $1,500 win bonus) def. J.P. Felty: $1,500
