= SpiritBank Event Center =

Multipurpose convention center

- Interactive map of SpiritBank Event Center
- Location: 10441 S Regal Blvd. Bixby, Oklahoma
- Coordinates: 36°0′41″N 95°52′57″W
- Owner: SpiritBank
- Operator: SpiritBank
- Capacity: 4,500
- Surface: Multi

Construction
- Opened: 2008
- Cost: $50 million

Tenant
- Tulsa 66ers (NBA D-League) (2008–2009, 2012–2014)

The SpiritBank Event Center was a 4,500 seat multi-purpose arena and convention center in Bixby, Oklahoma built at a cost of $50 million. The center contains 35,000 sq ft (3,300 m^{2}). of arena floor space and 10,000 sq ft (930 m^{2}). of banquet rooms/ballrooms.

== History ==
Since opening in 2008 it has been the site of numerous concerts and events, including ZZ Top, Stone Temple Pilots, Jason Mraz, Lynyrd Skynyrd and Chris Tomlin. In December 2008, it became the new home of the Tulsa 66ers of the NBA Development League. (Previously, the team played at the Expo Square Pavilion.) After the 2008–2009 season, however, the team announced it would seek another venue for the next season, and it filed a lawsuit against the owner of the arena.

In late 2009, ownership and management of the arena (and its surrounding Regal Plaza retail and office center) was transferred to Tulsa-based SpiritBank, which had lent about $28 million to the original developers. The bank stated its intention to keep the facility operational while seeking a buyer. In September 2010 the facility was sold to an investment group, but the bank bought it back in June 2011. In May 2012 the 66ers announced that they would return to the SpiritBank Center for the 2012–2013 season.

In June 2014, SpiritBank announced that it would no longer seek bookings for the main arena, and would no longer lease the space. In August 2019, Transformation Church purchased the building for $10.5 million and turned it into a church.
