= Gilbert Melendez =

American mixed martial artist

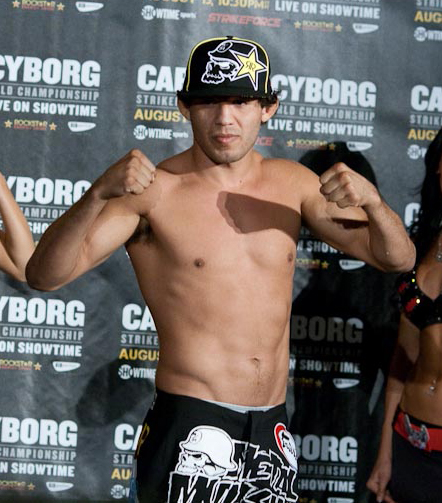
- Gilbert Melendez in 2009, at the weigh-in before the Strikeforce: Carano vs. Cyborg event.
- Born: April 12, 1982 (age 44); Santa Ana, California, United States
- Other names: El Niño
- Height: 5 ft 9 in (1.75 m)
- Weight: 155 lb (70 kg; 11 st 1 lb)
- Division: Featherweight; Lightweight
- Reach: 73 in (185 cm)
- Style: Boxing, Wrestling, Brazilian Jiu Jitsu
- Fighting out of: San Francisco, California, United States
- Team: Cesar Gracie Jiu-Jitsu; El Niño Sports; Fairtex Gym
- Rank: Black belt in Brazilian Jiu-Jitsu under Cesar Gracie
- Years active: 2002–present

Mixed martial arts record
- Total: 30
- Wins: 22
- By knockout: 12
- By decision: 10
- Losses: 8
- By submission: 1
- By decision: 7

Amateur record
- Total: 2
- Wins: 2

Other information
- Website: elninomma.com
- Mixed martial arts record from Sherdog
- Last updated on: April 18, 2010

Gilbert Melendez (born April 12, 1982) is an American mixed martial artist who formerly competed in the Lightweight division of the Ultimate Fighting Championship (UFC). He is a two-time Strikeforce Lightweight Champion and a former WEC Lightweight Champion. He also competed in PRIDE FC, Shooto and Rumble on the Rock.

Melendez was nicknamed after the El Niño storm, it was given to him by a Japanese broadcaster describing his fight-style and the manner in which he stormed through the Shooto Lightweight division.

== Background ==
Melendez is from Santa Ana, California, of Mexican descent. He wrestled at Santa Ana High School. Melendez always enjoyed combat sports and competition, but did not start training in MMA until after college when he was introduced to the sport by his good friend and MMA fighter Jake Shields. Melendez attended San Francisco State University and was studying in liberal arts, he anticipated becoming a teacher but did not finish his college education and get a degree, on account of training for MMA and working outside of college. He has stated that someday he plans on finishing his college education. Before becoming a professional fighter, he worked as a waiter and he also had a job at a Fairtex gear shop, which would later be one of his sponsors.

== Mixed martial arts career ==
Melendez made his debut in the World Extreme Cagefighting and started off his career dominating his opponents, winning his first three career fights all by knockout due to punches before receiving an opportunity to fight for the first WEC Lightweight Championship against fan-favorite Olaf Alfonso at WEC 10. Melendez won the bout by TKO due to punches and became the first WEC Lightweight Champion. Two fights later, Melendez, still undefeated, made his debut in Japan's Shooto against Hiroyuki Takaya, which Melendez won by unanimous decision. He followed this up with two more TKO wins in Shooto to bring his record to 8-0 before making his Strikeforce debut against Harris Sarmiento, which Melendez won after his opponent tapped out due to punches received.

Melendez won the Strikeforce Lightweight Championship from future UFC veteran Clay Guida by a split decision on June 9, 2006.

Melendez then made his debut in PRIDE FC at PRIDE Bushido 12, winning by unanimous decision. In his next fight for the organization he faced then Shooto Lightweight Champion Tatsuya Kawajiri. Melendez won again by unanimous decision. He returned to Strikeforce to fight Tetsuji Kato in a non-title bout, and won his third straight fight by a unanimous decision.

Melendez then faced Mitsuhiro Ishida at the Yarennoka! event on New Year's Eve in 2007 at the Saitama Super Arena in Japan. Melendez received his first career loss against the Japanese fighter by unanimous decision.

=== Strikeforce ===
Melendez held the Strikeforce Lightweight Championship belt for two years before losing it on June 27, 2008, to Josh Thomson by unanimous decision (50–45, 50–45, 50–45) at Strikeforce: Melendez vs. Thomson.

On August 15, 2009, Melendez was again set to rematch Josh Thomson at Strikeforce: Carano vs. Cyborg but Thomson was not cleared to fight, due to lingering problems with his leg. Mitsuhiro Ishida was selected to replace Thomson in what became Melendez' first Interim title defense.

On December 19, 2009, Melendez fought Josh Thomson to unify the Strikeforce Lightweight Championship belts. Melendez won the fight via unanimous decision to become the Strikeforce Lightweight Champion. With the win he also avenged the second of his only two losses to date.

Melendez successfully defended the Strikeforce Lightweight Championship against current DREAM Lightweight Champion and former Shooto Middleweight Champion Shinya Aoki on April 17, 2010.

A rematch between Melendez and Tatsuya Kawajiri took take place on April 9, 2011, at Strikeforce 33 in April. Melendez dominated his opponent showing excellent striking, knocking down Kawajiri with a right hand near the beginning of the fight. Melendez then again knocked down Kawajiri with a combination of knees to the body and a right hook followed by a right uppercut. The beginning of the end came when Melendez sprawled one of Kawajiri's takedowns and then began landing short left hands which knocked Kawajiri down into half-guard where Melendez began landing vicious right elbows before the referee stopped the fight declaring Melendez the winner by TKO 3:14 into the first round.

Melendez faced Jorge Masvidal next. UFC president Dana White briefly put the bout in question when he revealed to reporters that he was working to bring Melendez into the UFC fold "ASAP" with the possibility of Melendez entering with an immediate shot at the belt. Melendez eventually defended his title against challenger Jorge Masvidal at Strikeforce: Melendez vs. Masvidal. He won the fight via unanimous decision.

Melendez took on Josh Thomson in a rubber match for the Strikeforce Lightweight Championship at Strikeforce: Barnett vs. Cormier in San Jose, California on May 19, 2012. He won the fight via split decision. Fans did not agree with the decision and Josh Thomson was visibly disappointed by the decision. Booing immediately followed the decision and continuously throughout Melendez's post fight interview. Thomson, although not pleased with the decision, showed class in defeat by asking the crowd to stop booing and support the local fighter.

Melendez was expected to face Pat Healy for the Strikeforce Lightweight Championship on September 29, 2012, in Sacramento, California. It was announced on September 22, 2012, that Melendez suffered an injury and had to withdraw from the fight. Due to Melendez' injury, Showtime opted not to air the card without the main event, thus causing Strikeforce to cancel the card becoming the second MMA card cancelled within a month under the Zuffa organization.

The bout with Healy was rescheduled for January 12, 2013 at Strikeforce: Marquardt vs. Saffiedine, but again, Melendez pulled out of the bout citing a shoulder injury.

=== Ultimate Fighting Championship ===
The Strikeforce promotion was dissolved into the UFC by parent company Zuffa on January 12, 2013. Melendez received an immediate UFC title shot and made his promotional debut against Benson Henderson on April 20, 2013, at UFC on Fox 7. Melendez lost a split decision in a closely contested bout.

In his second UFC fight, Melendez faced Diego Sanchez on October 19, 2013, at UFC 166. He won the fight via unanimous decision. The win also earned him his first Fight of the Night award. On UFC.com Joe Rogan called the brawl between Melendez and Sanchez the best he's ever seen.

Melendez was scheduled to face Khabib Nurmagomedov at UFC 170. However, the fight was later cancelled due to undisclosed reasons.

After negotiating with the UFC for his new contract, there was speculation that Melendez may sign with Bellator. In the process, Melendez also got an offer from World Series of Fighting. He then agreed to sign with Bellator, but the UFC had the right to match their offer. Melendez ultimately re-signed with the UFC after he was given the opportunity to serve as a coach on The Ultimate Fighter 20, opposite UFC Lightweight Champion Anthony Pettis, the two would face each other at UFC 181 on December 6, 2014. He lost the fight via guillotine choke in the second round.

Melendez then faced Eddie Alvarez on June 13, 2015, at UFC 188. He lost the fight by a close split decision.

Melendez was tabbed as a short notice replacement to face Al Iaquinta on July 15, 2015, at UFC Fight Night 71, taking the place of Bobby Green. However, Melendez was removed from the card on July 6 after it was revealed that he tested positive for performance-enhancing drugs after his previous fight at UFC 188. In addition, Melendez was suspended for one year from the date of the bout for violation of the UFC Fighter Conduct Policy.

Melendez next faced Edson Barboza on July 23, 2016, at UFC on Fox 20. Melendez lost the fight by unanimous decision.

Melendez faced Jeremy Stephens in a featherweight bout on September 9, 2017, at UFC 215. He lost the fight via unanimous decision. Both participants were awarded Fight of the Night honors for their performance.

Melendez was scheduled to face Arnold Allen on November 30, 2018, at The Ultimate Fighter 28 Finale. However, Melendez pulled out of the fight on November 5 and was replaced by Rick Glenn.

Melendez faced Arnold Allen on July 6, 2019, at UFC 239. He lost the fight via unanimous decision.

On November 11, 2019, it was reported that Melendez was released by the UFC.

== Personal life ==
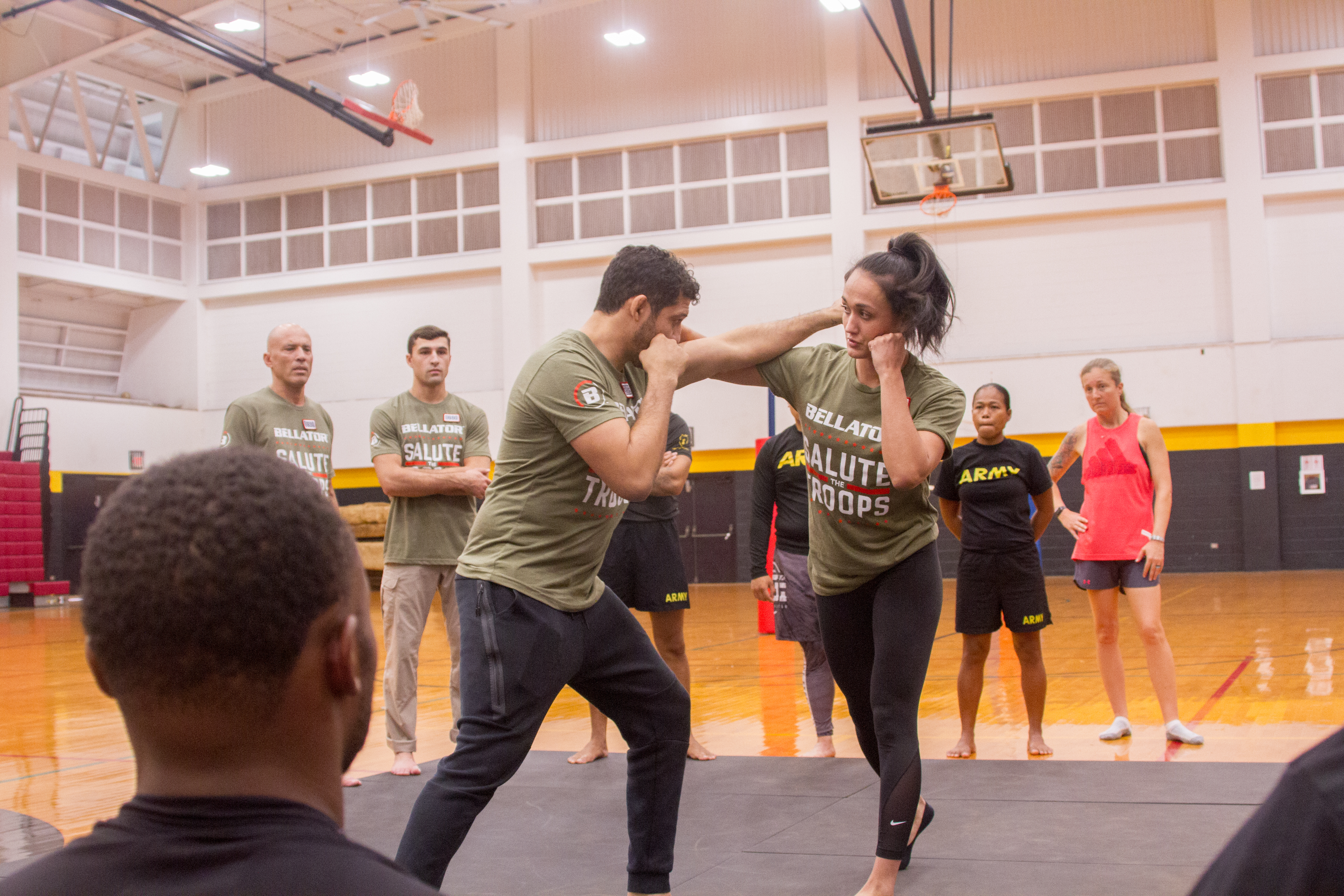
Gil and Keri Melendez teach soldiers martial arts techniques at Schofield Barracks, Hawaii, in 2019

Melendez and his wife Keri Anne Taylor-Melendez have a daughter born August 8, 2010. Keri Anne is a Muay Thai fighter with a 10–2 record as a pro (Muay Thai and Kickboxing). She also has a knockout win as an MMA fighter.

== Film and television ==
Melendez starred alongside teammates Jake Shields and the Diaz brothers in the award-winning mixed martial arts documentary Fight Life, the film is directed by James Z. Feng and produced by RiLL Films, it was released in 2013.

He also has provided commentary and analysis for ESPN before each Pay Per View.

He coached season 20 of The Ultimate Fighter for the UFC.

== Championships and accomplishments ==
- Strikeforce
  - Strikeforce Lightweight Championship (Two times; last)
    - Five successful title defenses
  - Interim Strikeforce Lightweight Championship (One time)
    - One successful title defense
  - Most title fight wins in Strikeforce history (9)
  - Most championship bouts in Strikeforce history (10)
  - Most successful title defenses in Strikeforce history (6)
  - Most consecutive title defenses in Strikeforce history (4)
  - Most wins in Strikeforce history (11)
  - Most significant strikes landed in Strikeforce history (749)
- Ultimate Fighting Championship
  - Fight of the Night (Two times) vs. Diego Sanchez and Jeremy Stephens
  - UFC.com Awards
    - 2013: Ranked #4 Import of the Year & Ranked #4 Fight of the Year vs. Diego Sanchez
- World Extreme Cagefighting
  - WEC Lightweight Championship (One time; first)
- International Fighting Championships
  - IFC Night of Warriors Amateur Tournament Winner
- Inside MMA
  - 2013 Fight of the Year Bazzie Award vs. Diego Sanchez on October 19
- Sports Illustrated
  - 2009 Round of the Year vs. Josh Thomson on December 19; Round 5
- MMA Fighting
  - 2006 Lightweight Fighter of the Year
- Wrestling Observer Newsletter
  - 2013 Fight of the Year vs. Diego Sanchez on October 19

== Mixed martial arts record ==
Professional record breakdown
| 30 matches | 22 wins | 8 losses |
| By knockout | 12 | 0 |
| By submission | 0 | 1 |
| By decision | 10 | 7 |

| Res. | Record | Opponent | Method | Event | Date | Round | Time | Location | Notes |
|---|---|---|---|---|---|---|---|---|---|
| Loss | 22–8 | Arnold Allen | Decision (unanimous) | UFC 239 | July 6, 2019 | 3 | 5:00 | Las Vegas, Nevada, United States | |
| Loss | 22–7 | Jeremy Stephens | Decision (unanimous) | UFC 215 | September 9, 2017 | 3 | 5:00 | Edmonton, Alberta, Canada | Return to Featherweight. Fight of the Night. |
| Loss | 22–6 | Edson Barboza | Decision (unanimous) | UFC on Fox: Holm vs. Shevchenko | July 23, 2016 | 3 | 5:00 | Chicago, Illinois, United States | |
| Loss | 22–5 | Eddie Alvarez | Decision (split) | UFC 188 | June 13, 2015 | 3 | 5:00 | Mexico City, Mexico | Melendez tested positive for exogenous origin of testosterone metabolites. |
| Loss | 22–4 | Anthony Pettis | Submission (guillotine choke) | UFC 181 | December 6, 2014 | 2 | 1:53 | Las Vegas, Nevada, United States | For the UFC Lightweight Championship. |
| Win | 22–3 | Diego Sanchez | Decision (unanimous) | UFC 166 | October 19, 2013 | 3 | 5:00 | Houston, Texas, United States | Fight of the Night. |
| Loss | 21–3 | Benson Henderson | Decision (split) | UFC on Fox: Henderson vs. Melendez | April 20, 2013 | 5 | 5:00 | San Jose, California, United States | For the UFC Lightweight Championship. |
| Win | 21–2 | Josh Thomson | Decision (split) | Strikeforce: Barnett vs. Cormier | May 19, 2012 | 5 | 5:00 | San Jose, California, United States | Defended the Strikeforce Lightweight Championship. |
| Win | 20–2 | Jorge Masvidal | Decision (unanimous) | Strikeforce: Melendez vs. Masvidal | December 17, 2011 | 5 | 5:00 | San Diego, California, United States | Defended the Strikeforce Lightweight Championship. |
| Win | 19–2 | Tatsuya Kawajiri | TKO (elbows) | Strikeforce: Diaz vs. Daley | April 9, 2011 | 1 | 3:14 | San Diego, California, United States | Defended the Strikeforce Lightweight Championship. Broke the record for the most consecutive Strikeforce Lightweight Championship title defenses (2). |
| Win | 18–2 | Shinya Aoki | Decision (unanimous) | Strikeforce: Nashville | April 17, 2010 | 5 | 5:00 | Nashville, Tennessee, United States | Defended the Strikeforce Lightweight Championship. |
| Win | 17–2 | Josh Thomson | Decision (unanimous) | Strikeforce: Evolution | December 19, 2009 | 5 | 5:00 | San Jose, California, United States | Won and unified the Strikeforce Lightweight Championship. |
| Win | 16–2 | Mitsuhiro Ishida | TKO (punches) | Strikeforce: Carano vs. Cyborg | August 15, 2009 | 3 | 3:56 | San Jose, California, United States | Defended the interim Strikeforce Lightweight Championship. |
| Win | 15–2 | Rodrigo Damm | KO (punches) | Strikeforce: Shamrock vs. Diaz | April 11, 2009 | 2 | 2:02 | San Jose, California, United States | Won the interim Strikeforce Lightweight Championship. |
| Loss | 14–2 | Josh Thomson | Decision (unanimous) | Strikeforce: Melendez vs. Thomson | June 27, 2008 | 5 | 5:00 | San Jose, California, United States | Lost the Strikeforce Lightweight Championship. |
| Win | 14–1 | Gabe Lemley | TKO (punches) | Strikeforce: Shamrock vs. Le | March 29, 2008 | 2 | 2:18 | San Jose, California, United States | Defended the Strikeforce Lightweight Championship. |
| Loss | 13–1 | Mitsuhiro Ishida | Decision (unanimous) | Yarennoka! | December 31, 2007 | 2 | 5:00 | Saitama, Japan | |
| Win | 13–0 | Tetsuji Kato | Decision (unanimous) | Strikeforce: Playboy Mansion | September 29, 2007 | 3 | 5:00 | Beverly Hills, California, United States | Non-title bout. |
| Win | 12–0 | Tatsuya Kawajiri | Decision (unanimous) | PRIDE FC: Shockwave 2006 | December 31, 2006 | 2 | 5:00 | Saitama, Japan | |
| Win | 11–0 | Nobuhiro Obiya | Decision (unanimous) | Pride - Bushido 12 | August 26, 2006 | 2 | 5:00 | Nagoya, Japan | |
| Win | 10–0 | Clay Guida | Decision (split) | Strikeforce: Revenge | June 9, 2006 | 5 | 5:00 | San Jose, California, United States | Won the Strikeforce Lightweight Championship. |
| Win | 9–0 | Harris Sarmiento | Submission (punches) | Strikeforce: Shamrock vs. Gracie | March 10, 2006 | 2 | 0:44 | San Jose, California, United States | |
| Win | 8–0 | Rumina Sato | TKO (doctor stoppage) | Shooto: Alive Road | August 20, 2005 | 1 | 1:32 | Yokohama, Japan | Shooto Lightweight (143 lbs) bout. |
| Win | 7–0 | Naoya Uematsu | TKO (doctor stoppage) | Shooto: 5/4 in Korakuen Hall | May 4, 2005 | 2 | 4:30 | Tokyo, Japan | Shooto Lightweight (143 lbs) bout. |
| Win | 6–0 | Hiroyuki Takaya | Decision (unanimous) | Shooto: Year End Show 2004 | December 14, 2004 | 3 | 5:00 | Tokyo, Japan | Shooto Lightweight (143 lbs) bout. |
| Win | 5–0 | Kaynan Kaku | TKO (punches) | Rumble on the Rock 6 | November 20, 2004 | 2 | 3:58 | Honolulu, Hawaii, United States | |
| Win | 4–0 | Olaf Alfonso | TKO (punches) | WEC 10 | May 21, 2004 | 3 | 4:54 | Lemoore, California, United States | Return to Lightweight. Won the vacant WEC Lightweight Championship. |
| Win | 3–0 | Stephen Palling | TKO (punches) | Rumble on the Rock 4 | October 10, 2003 | 2 | 4:59 | Honolulu, Hawaii, United States | Featherweight debut. |
| Win | 2–0 | Jeff Hougland | TKO (punches) | WEC 6 | March 27, 2003 | 2 | 2:05 | Lemoore, California, United States | |
| Win | 1–0 | Greg Quan | TKO (punches) | WEC 5 | October 18, 2002 | 1 | 4:37 | Lemoore, California, United States | Lightweight debut. |

== See also ==
- List of male mixed martial artists
- Mixed martial artists from California

Awards and achievements
| New championship | 1st WEC Lightweight Champion; May 21, 2004 – October 21, 2004 | Vacant Melendez left WEC Title next held by Gabe Ruediger |
| Preceded by Clay Guida | 2nd Strikeforce Lightweight Champion; June 9, 2006 – June 27, 2008 | Succeeded by Josh Thomson |
| New championship | 1st Strikeforce Interim Lightweight Champion; April 11, 2009 – December 19, 2009 | Vacant Won Strikeforce Lightweight Championship |
| Preceded by Josh Thomson | 4th and final Strikeforce Lightweight Champion; December 19, 2009 – January 12, 2013 | Vacant Strikeforce banner dissolved into UFC |
