= Billy Evangelista =

American mixed martial arts fighter

- Born: October 7, 1980 (age 46); Parlier, California, United States
- Height: 5 ft 8 in (1.73 m)
- Weight: 155 lb (70 kg; 11.1 st)
- Division: Welterweight; Lightweight
- Fighting out of: Fresno, California, United States
- Team: American Kickboxing Academy; Team Buhawe
- Years active: 2006-2014

Mixed martial arts record
- Total: 17
- Wins: 13
- By knockout: 5
- By decision: 8
- Losses: 3
- By submission: 1
- By decision: 2
- No contests: 1

Other information
- Mixed martial arts record from Sherdog

Billy Evangelista (born October 7, 1980) is an American former mixed martial artist. A professional from 2006 until 2014, he fought for World Extreme Cagefighting, Strikeforce, and the Palace Fighting Championship in his career.

== Background ==
Evangelista was born and raised in Parlier, California and began wrestling when he was in the seventh grade. He continued at Parlier High School, where he was ranked #1 in his league as both a sophomore and junior. As a junior, he placed sixth in the Valley Championship, barely missing state qualifications. After graduating in 1999, he continued his wrestling career at Fresno City College for one season before enlisting in the United States Army in the Airborne Infantry division. He did a three-year tour and was based in Alaska. Six months prior to leaving the army, Evangelista was introduced to jiu-jitsu by his brother Jorge, who also wrestled at Fresno City College. After having his arm hyper-extended by a friend of his brother's, Evangelista fell in love with the sport and began training soon after.

== Mixed martial arts career ==
=== Early career ===
Evangelista, who weighed 215 lbs, also began mixed martial arts as a way to lose weight. After compiling a 2-0 amateur MMA record, he made his professional MMA debut in January 2006. After a year away from the sport, he continued fighting in February 2007 when he made his debut for Strikeforce. During his career he trained under Jasper Tayaba at Team Buhawe and Javier Mendez at the American Kickboxing Academy.

=== Strikeforce ===
Over the next two years he amassed an impressive undefeated streak of 9–0.

Evangelista suffered his first recorded loss in a fight against Mike Aina at Strikeforce Challengers: Evangelista vs. Aina. He was originally disqualified for an alleged illegal knee strike to the head. However, replays showed it was a legal blow and the decision was eventually overturned by the California State Athletic Commission.

Evangelista would rebound from this controversial loss, defeating both Waachiim Spiritwolf and Jorge Gurgel via decision on Strikeforce Challengers shows. He eventually did suffer his first defeat via decision against Jorge Masvidal at Strikeforce: Feijao vs. Henderson.

Evangelista then faced K. J. Noons at Strikeforce: Melendez vs. Masvidal in December 2011. He lost the fight via unanimous decision.

After Strikeforce closed in January 2013, Evangelista was not among the fighters imported to the Ultimate Fighting Championship roster, having lost his last two Strikeforce bouts. He returned to action at The Warriors Cage: Conflict on June 21, 2013, finishing Josh Thornburg by TKO for his first stoppage win since 2008.

== Mixed martial arts record ==
Professional record breakdown
17 matches	13 wins	3 losses
By knockout	5	0
By submission	0	1
By decision	8	2
No contests	1	

Res.	Record	Opponent	Method	Event	Date	Round	Time	Location	Notes
Loss	13–3 (1)	Felipe Fogolin	Submission (rear-naked choke)	TWC 20: Isolation	June 20, 2014	1	1:41	Porterville, California, United States	
Win	13–2 (1)	Josh Thornburg	TKO (punches)	TWC 17: Conflict	June 21, 2013	3	1:31	Porterville, California, United States	
Win	12–2 (1)	Zak Bucia	Decision (unanimous)	UPC Unlimited: Up & Comers 15	May 11, 2013	3	5:00	Fresno, California, United States	Welterweight debut.
Loss	11–2 (1)	K. J. Noons	Decision (unanimous)	Strikeforce: Melendez vs. Masvidal	December 17, 2011	3	5:00	San Diego, California, United States	
Loss	11–1 (1)	Jorge Masvidal	Decision (unanimous)	Strikeforce: Feijao vs. Henderson	March 5, 2011	3	5:00	Columbus, Ohio, United States	
Win	11–0 (1)	Waachiim Spiritwolf	Decision (unanimous)	Strikeforce Challengers: Bowling vs. Voelker	October 22, 2010	3	5:00	Fresno, California, United States	Catchweight (165 lbs) bout.
Win	10–0 (1)	Jorge Gurgel	Decision (unanimous)	Strikeforce Challengers: Gurgel vs. Evangelista	November 6, 2009	3	5:00	Fresno, California, United States	Catchweight (160 lbs) bout.
NC	9–0 (1)	Mike Aina	No Contest (overturned by CSAC)	Strikeforce Challengers: Evangelista vs. Aina	May 15, 2009	2	3:42	Fresno, California, United States	Catchweight (157 lbs) bout. Originally a DQ win for Aina due to an illegal knee strike to the head; overturned after it was determined that the knee struck the shoulder, not the head.
Win	9–0	Harris Sarmiento	Decision (unanimous)	PFC 12: High Stakes	January 22, 2009	3	3:00	Lemoore, California, United States	
Win	8–0	Luke Caudillo	Decision (unanimous)	Strikeforce: Payback	September 3, 2008	3	5:00	Denver, Colorado, United States	
Win	7–0	Nam Phan	Decision (split)	Strikeforce: Melendez vs. Thomson	June 27, 2008	3	5:00	San Jose, California, United States	
Win	6–0	Marlon Sims	KO (punch)	Strikeforce: Shamrock vs. Le	March 29, 2008	3	0:39	San Jose, California, United States	Catchweight (163 lbs) bout.
Win	5–0	Clint Coronel	Decision (split)	Strikeforce: Playboy Mansion	September 29, 2007	3	5:00	Beverly Hills, California, United States	
Win	4–0	Ryan Bixler	Decision (unanimous)	Melee on the Mountain	July 24, 2007	5	5:00	Friant, California, United States	
Win	3–0	Alexander Crispim	TKO (punches)	Gladiator Challenge 61	March 31, 2007	3	3:48	San Francisco, California, United States	
Win	2–0	Isaiah Hill	TKO (punches)	Strikeforce: Young Guns	February 10, 2007	1	1:39	San Jose, California, United States	
Win	1–0	Ryan Healy	TKO (punches and elbows)	WEC 18: Unfinished Business	January 13, 2006	2	2:06	Lemoore, California, United States	

== See also ==
- List of Strikeforce alumni
