= 2010 in Strikeforce =

Mixed martial arts events

Information
- First date: January 30, 2010
- Last date: December 4, 2010

Events
- Total events: 15

Fights
- Total fights: 165
- Title fights: 13

Chronology
2009 in Strikeforce	2010 in Strikeforce	2011 in Strikeforce

The year 2010 was the 5th year in the history of Strikeforce, a mixed martial arts promotion based in the United States. In 2010 Strikeforce held 15 events beginning with, Strikeforce: Miami.

== Title fights ==
Title fights in 2010
Weight class				Method	Round	Time	Event	Notes
Welterweight	Nick Diaz	def.	Marius Zaromskis	TKO (Punches)	1	4:38	Strikeforce: Miami	(Note: For the Welterweight Championship.)
Featherweight	Cristiane Justino (c)	def.	Marloes Coenen	TKO (Punches)	3	3:40	Strikeforce: Miami	(Note: For the Women's Featherweight Championship.)
Bantamweight	Sarah Kaufman	def.	Takayo Hashi	Decision (Unanimous)	5	5:00	Strikeforce Challengers: Kaufman vs. Hashi	(Note: For the Women's Bantamweight Championship.)
Middleweight	Jake Shields (c)	def.	Dan Henderson	Decision (Unanimous)	5	5:00	Strikeforce: Nashville	(Note: For the Middleweight Championship.)
Lightweight	Gilbert Melendez (c)	def.	Shinya Aoki	Decision (Unanimous)	5	5:00	Strikeforce: Nashville	(Note: For the Lightweight Championship.)
Light Heavyweight	Muhammed Lawal	def.	Gegard Mousasi (c)	Decision (Unanimous)	5	5:00	Strikeforce: Nashville	(Note: For the Light Heavyweight Championship.)
Heavyweight	Alistair Overeem (c)	def.	Brett Rogers	TKO (Punches)	1	3:40	Strikeforce: Heavy Artillery	(Note: For the Heavyweight Championship.)
Featherweight	Cristiane Justino (c)	def.	Jan Finney	KO (Knee to the Body)	2	2:56	Strikeforce: Fedor vs. Werdum	(Note: For the Women's Featherweight Championship.)
Bantamweight	Sarah Kaufman (c)	def.	Roxanne Modafferi	KO (Slam)	3	4:45	Strikeforce Challengers: del Rosario vs. Mahe	(Note: For the Women's Bantamweight Championship.)
Light Heavyweight	Rafael Cavalcante	def.	Muhammed Lawal (c)	TKO (Punches and Elbows)	3	1:14	Strikeforce: Houston	(Note: For the Light Heavyweight Championship.)
Middleweight	Ronaldo Souza	def.	Tim Kennedy	Decision (Unanimous)	5	5:00	Strikeforce: Houston	(Note: For the Middleweight Championship.)
Welterweight	Nick Diaz (c)	def.	K. J. Noons	Decision (Unanimous)	5	5:00	Strikeforce: Diaz vs. Noons II	(Note: For the Welterweight Championship.)
Bantamweight	Marloes Coenen	def.	Sarah Kaufman (c)	Submission (Armbar)	3	1:59	Strikeforce: Diaz vs. Noons II	(Note: For the Women's Bantamweight Championship.)

== Events list ==
#	Event title	Date	Arena	Location	Attendance	Broadcast
41	Strikeforce: Henderson vs. Babalu II	December 4, 2010	Scottrade Center	St. Louis, Missouri	7,146	Showtime
40	Strikeforce Challengers: Wilcox vs. Ribeiro	November 19, 2010	Jackson Convention Complex	Jackson, Mississippi		Showtime
39	Strikeforce Challengers: Bowling vs. Voelker	October 22, 2010	Save Mart Center	Fresno, California	3,656	Showtime
38	Strikeforce: Diaz vs. Noons II	October 9, 2010	HP Pavilion at San Jose	San Jose, California	7,559	Showtime
37	Strikeforce: Houston	August 21, 2010	Toyota Center	Houston, Texas	8,635	Showtime
36	Strikeforce Challengers: Riggs vs. Taylor	August 13, 2010	Dodge Theatre	Phoenix, Arizona		Showtime
35	Strikeforce Challengers: del Rosario vs. Mahe	July 23, 2010	Comcast Arena at Everett	Everett, Washington		Showtime
34	Strikeforce: Fedor vs. Werdum	June 26, 2010	HP Pavilion at San Jose	San Jose, California	11,757	Showtime
33	Strikeforce: Los Angeles	June 16, 2010	Nokia Theatre	Los Angeles, California	5,259	Showtime
32	Strikeforce Challengers: Lindland vs. Casey	May 21, 2010	Rose Garden	Portland, Oregon	5,790	Showtime
31	Strikeforce: Heavy Artillery	May 15, 2010	Scottrade Center	St. Louis, Missouri	8,136	Showtime
30	Strikeforce: Nashville	April 17, 2010	Bridgestone Arena	Nashville, Tennessee	8,196	CBS
29	Strikeforce Challengers: Johnson vs. Mahe	March 26, 2010	Save Mart Center	Fresno, California	4,963	Showtime
28	Strikeforce Challengers: Kaufman vs. Hashi	February 26, 2010	San Jose Civic Auditorium	San Jose, California	2,318	Showtime
27	Strikeforce: Miami	January 30, 2010	BankAtlantic Center	Sunrise, Florida	7,010	Showtime

== Strikeforce: Miami ==
Strikeforce: Miami was an event held on January 30, 2010 at the BankAtlantic Center in Sunrise, Florida.

=== Results ===
Main Card
Weight class				Method	Round	Time	Notes
Welterweight	Nick Diaz	def	Marius Žaromskis	KO (punch)	1	4:38	(Note: For the Welterweight Championship.)
Women's Featherweight	Cristiane Santos (c)	def	Marloes Coenen	TKO (punches)	3	3:40	(Note: For the Women's Featherweight Championship.)
Heavyweight	Herschel Walker	def	Greg Nagy	TKO (punches)	3	2:17
Middleweight	Robbie Lawler	def	Melvin Manhoef	KO (punch)	1	3:33
Heavyweight	Bobby Lashley	def	Wes Sims	TKO (punches)	1	2:06
EASportsMMA.com Live Stream
Welterweight	Jay Hieron	def	Joe Riggs	Decision (unanimous) (29–28, 30–27, 30–27)	3	5:00
Preliminary card
Welterweight	John Kelly	def	Sabah Homasi	Submission (rear-naked choke)	2	2:48
Welterweight	Hayder Hassan	def	Ryan Keenan	KO (punch)	2	2:42
Featherweight	Pablo Alfonso	def	Marcos da Matta	Submission (armbar)	1	1:47
Lightweight	David Gomez	def	Craig Oxley	Decision (unanimous) (30–27, 30–27, 30–27)	3	5:00
Welterweight	Joe Ray	def	John Clarke	TKO (punches)	1	3:14
Middleweight	Jeffrey Cachia	def	Matt Cooper	KO (punches)	2	2:26
Welterweight	Michael Byrnes	def	Dave Zitanick	Decision (majority) (29–29, 30–27, 30–27)	3	5:00

== Strikeforce Challengers: Kaufman vs. Hashi ==
Strikeforce Challengers: Kaufman vs. Hashi
- Promotion: Strikeforce
- Date: February 26, 2010
- Venue: San Jose Civic Auditorium
- City: San Jose, California

Event chronology
Strikeforce: Miami	Strikeforce Challengers: Kaufman vs. Hashi	Strikeforce: Lawler vs. Shields

Strikeforce Challengers: Kaufman vs. Hashi was an event held on February 26, 2010 at the San Jose Civic Auditorium in San Jose, California.

=== Results ===
Main Card
Weight class				Method	Round	Time	Notes
Bantamweight	Sarah Kaufman	def.	Takayo Hashi	Decision (Unanimous)	5	5:00	(Note: For the Women's Bantamweight Championship.)
	Trevor Prangley	vs.	Karl Amoussou	Technical Draw (Accidental Thumb to Amoussou's Eye)	1	4:14
	Luke Rockhold	def.	Paul Bradley	TKO (Knees to the Body)	1	2:24
	Tarec Saffiedine	def.	James Terry	Decision (Unanimous)	3	5:00
	Yancy Medeiros	def.	Raul Castillo	Decision (Unanimous)	3	5:00
	Wayne Phillips	def.	Eric Lawson	Submission (Armbar)	1	4:27
	Samuel Bracamonte	def.	Chris Stewart	TKO (Punches)	3	0:59
	Tristan Arenal	def.	George Miller	TKO (Punches)	2	0:30
	Jesse Tobar	def.	Johnson Nguyen	Submission (Rear-Naked Choke)	2	1:24
	Renee Robinson	def.	Lilia Salas	TKO (Punches)	1	1:06
	Steve Dickey	def.	Alan Lummel	TKO (Punches)	1	0:33
	Ronald Carillo	def.	Anthony De Los Santos	Submission (Armbar)	2	1:20

== Strikeforce Challengers: Johnson vs. Mahe ==
Strikeforce Challengers: Johnson vs. Mahe
- Promotion: Strikeforce
- Date: March 26, 2010
- Venue: Save Mart Center
- City: Fresno, California

Event chronology
Strikeforce: Shamrock vs. Diaz	Strikeforce Challengers: Johnson vs. Mahe	Strikeforce: Lawler vs. Shields

Strikeforce Challengers: Johnson vs. Mahe was an event held on March 26, 2010 at the Save Mart Center in Fresno, California.

=== Results ===
Main Card
Weight class				Method	Round	Time	Notes
	Lavar Johnson	def.	Lolohea Mahe	TKO (Punches)	2	3:29
	Ron Humphrey	def.	George Bush	Submission (Guillotine Choke)	1	1:44
	Andre Galvao	def.	Luke Stewart	Decision (Split)	3	5:00
	Miesha Tate	def.	Zoila Frausto	Submission (Armbar)	2	4:09
	Justin Wilcox	def.	Shamar Bailey	Decision (Unanimous)	3	5:00
	Daniel Cormier	def.	John Devine	KO (Punch)	1	1:09
	Paul Ruiz	def.	John Chacon	Decision (Unanimous)	3	2:00
	Ricky Jackson	def.	Trinidad Valdez	KO (Punch)	1	1:59
	Avery Kaykeo	def.	Christian Buron	Decision (Split)	3	2:00

== Strikeforce: Nashville ==
Strikeforce: Nashville was an event held on April 17, 2010 at the Bridgestone Arena in Nashville, Tennessee.

=== Results ===
Main Card
Weight class				Method	Round	Time	Notes
Middleweight	Jake Shields (c)	def.	Dan Henderson	Decision (Unanimous)	5	5:00	(Note: For the Middleweight Championship.)
Lightweight	Gilbert Melendez (c)	def.	Shinya Aoki	Decision (Unanimous)	5	5:00	(Note: For the Lightweight Championship.)
Light Heavyweight	Muhammed Lawal	def.	Gegard Mousasi (c)	Decision (Unanimous)	5	5:00	(Note: For the Light Heavyweight Championship.)
Preliminary Card
Light Heavyweight	Ovince St. Preux	def.	Chris Hawk	TKO (Punches)	1	0:47
Welterweight	Andy Uhrich	def.	Dustin West	Submission (Rear-Naked Choke)	1	1:36
Middleweight	Jason Miller	def.	Tim Stout	TKO (Punches)	1	3:09
Light Heavyweight	Cale Yarbrough	def.	Josh Schockman	TKO (Knee and Punches)	2	1:01
Middleweight	Zach Underwood	def.	Hunter Worsham	Decision (Unanimous)	3	5:00
Flyweight	Dustin Ortiz	def.	Justin Pennington	Submission (Rear-Naked Choke)	1	4:27
Featherweight	Cody Floyd	def.	Thomas Campbell	KO (Knee)	3	0:41

== Strikeforce: Heavy Artillery ==
Strikeforce: Heavy Artillery was an event held on May 15, 2010 at the Scottrade Center in St. Louis, Missouri.

=== Results ===
Main Card
Weight class				Method	Round	Time	Notes
Heavyweight	Alistair Overeem (c)	def.	Brett Rogers	TKO (Punches)	1	3:40	(Note: For the Heavyweight Championship.)
Heavyweight	Antonio Silva	def.	Andrei Arlovski	Decision (Unanimous)	3	5:00
Middleweight	Ronaldo Souza	def.	Joey Villasenor	Decision (Unanimous)	3	5:00
Light Heavyweight	Roger Gracie	def.	Kevin Randleman	Submission (Rear-Naked Choke)	2	4:10
Light Heavyweight	Rafael Cavalcante	def.	Antwain Britt	KO (Punches)	1	3:45
Preliminary Card
Lightweight	Lyle Beerbohm	def.	Vítor Ribeiro	Decision (Split)	3	5:00
Catchweight (172 lb)	Jesse Finney	def.	Justin DeMoney	Submission (Guillotine Choke)	1	3:22
Lightweight	Matt Ricehouse	def.	Greg Wilson Jr.	Submission (Rear-Naked Choke)	3	0:45
Catchweight (157 lb)	Tom Aaron	def.	Erik Steenberg	Submission (Guillotine Choke)	1	0:56
Light Heavyweight	Francisco France	def.	Lee Brousseau	Submission (Rear-Naked Choke)	1	1:27
Welterweight	Michael Chandler	def.	Salvador Woods	Submission (Rear-Naked Choke)	1	0:59
Light Heavyweight	Darryl Cobb	def.	Booker DeRousse	Decision (Split)	3	5:00

== Strikeforce Challengers: Lindland vs. Casey ==
Strikeforce Challengers: Lindland vs. Casey
- Promotion: Strikeforce
- Date: May 21, 2010
- Venue: Rose Garden
- City: Portland, Oregon

Event chronology
Strikeforce: Shamrock vs. Diaz	Strikeforce Challengers: Lindland vs. Casey	Strikeforce: Lawler vs. Shields

Strikeforce Challengers: Lindland vs. Casey was an event held on May 21, 2010 at the Rose Garden in Portland, Oregon.

=== Results ===
Main Card
Weight class				Method	Round	Time	Notes
	Matt Lindland	def.	Kevin Casey	TKO (Punches)	3	3:41
	Tyron Woodley	def.	Nathan Coy	Decision (Split)	3	5:00
	Roger Bowling	def.	Bobby Voelker	Technical Decision (Unanimous)	3	1:38
	Tarec Saffiedine	def.	Nate Moore	KO (Punch)	2	1:21
	Pat Healy	def.	Bryan Travers	Decision (Unanimous)	3	5:00
	Pro Escobedo	def.	Jason Sharp	Decision (Unanimous)	3	5:00
	Blaine Macintosh	def.	Ben Morgan	Decision (Split)	3	3:00
	David Lloyd	def.	Jay Shaffer	Decision (Unanimous)	3	3:00
	Patrick Whittington	def.	Jason Lambert	Submission (Triangle Choke)	1	1:39
	Hamza Salim	def.	Lee Flores	Decision (Unanimous)	3	3:00

== Strikeforce: Los Angeles ==
Strikeforce: Los Angeles was an event held on June 16, 2010 at the Nokia Theatre in Los Angeles, California.

=== Results ===
Main card
Weight class				Method	Round	Time	Notes
Catchweight (195 lb)	Renato Sobral	def	Robbie Lawler	Decision (unanimous) (29–28, 29–28, 29–28)	3	5:00
Welterweight	Evangelista Santos	def	Marius Žaromskis	TKO (head kick and punches)	1	2:38
Middleweight	Tim Kennedy	def	Trevor Prangley	Submission (rear-naked choke)	1	3:35
Preliminary card
Catchweight (160 lb)	K. J. Noons	def	Conor Heun	Decision (split) (27–30, 29–28, 29–28)	3	5:00
Bantamweight	Hugo Sandoval	def	Marcus Kowal	TKO (strikes)	2	0:43
Catchweight (160 lb)	Jeremy Umphries	def	R.J. Clifford	Technical submission (rear-naked choke)	2	2:27

== Strikeforce: Fedor vs. Werdum ==
Strikeforce: Fedor vs. Werdum was an event held on June 26, 2010 at the HP Pavilion at San Jose in San Jose, California.

=== Results ===
Main Card
Weight class				Method	Round	Time	Notes
Heavyweight	Fabrício Werdum	def	Fedor Emelianenko	Submission (triangle armbar)	1	1:09
Women's Featherweight	Cristiane Santos (c)	def	Jan Finney	TKO (knee to the body)	2	2:56	(Note: For the Women's Featherweight Championship. Santos was docked one point for punching Finney in the back of the head.)
Middleweight	Cung Le	def	Scott Smith	KO (spinning back kick and punches)	2	1:46
Lightweight	Josh Thomson	def	Pat Healy	Submission (rear-naked choke)	3	4:27
Preliminary Card
Lightweight	Bobby Stack	def	Derrick Burnsed	Decision (split) (29–28, 27–30, 29–28)	3	5:00
Middleweight	Yancy Medeiros	def	Gareth Joseph	KO (punches)	2	1:19
Welterweight	Bret Bergmark	def	Vagner Rocha	Decision (unanimous) (29–28, 30–27, 30–26)	3	5:00
Middleweight	Chris Cope	def	Ron Keslar	TKO (head kick and punches)	2	4:32

== Strikeforce Challengers: del Rosario vs. Mahe ==
Strikeforce Challengers: del Rosario vs. Mahe
- Promotion: Strikeforce
- Date: July 23, 2010
- Venue: Comcast Arena at Everett
- City: Everett, Washington

Event chronology
Strikeforce: Shamrock vs. Diaz	Strikeforce Challengers: del Rosario vs. Mahe	Strikeforce: Lawler vs. Shields

Strikeforce Challengers: del Rosario vs. Mahe was an event held on July 23, 2010 at the Comcast Arena at Everett in Everett, Washington.

=== Results ===
Main Card
Weight class				Method	Round	Time	Notes
	Shane Del Rosario	def.	Lolohea Mahe	TKO (Knees and Punches)	1	3:48
Bantamweight	Sarah Kaufman (c)	def.	Roxanne Modafferi	KO (Slam)	3	4:45	(Note: For the Women's Bantamweight Championship.)
	Bobby Voelker	def.	Cory Devela	Decision (Split)	3	5:00
	Mike Kyle	def.	Ron Humphrey	Submission (Rear-Naked Choke)	2	3:28
	Caros Fodor	def.	Ousmane Thomas Diagne	Decision (Unanimous)	3	5:00
	Brent Knopp	def.	Ryan Hayes	TKO (Punches)	2	0:55
	C.J. Marsh	def.	Taurean Washington	Decision (Unanimous)	2	3:00
	Drew Brokenshire	def.	Jordan Mackin	Submission (Guillotine Choke)	1	2:26
	Scott McDonald	def.	Doug Kay	Submission (Rear-Naked Choke)	1	2:09
	Chris Inman	def.	Quincy Spruill	Submission (Kimura)	1	3:54
	Jamen Olney	def.	Jordan Currie	Decision (Unanimous)	2	3:00
	John Elam	def.	Frankie Orr	Decision (Split)	2	3:00
	Wendel Horton	def.	Keith Moratuccio	TKO (Punches)	1	N/A

== Strikeforce Challengers: Riggs vs. Taylor ==
Strikeforce Challengers: Riggs vs. Taylor
- Promotion: Strikeforce
- Date: August 13, 2010
- Venue: Dodge Theatre
- City: Phoenix, Arizona

Event chronology
Strikeforce: Shamrock vs. Diaz	Strikeforce Challengers: Riggs vs. Taylor	Strikeforce: Lawler vs. Shields

Strikeforce Challengers: Riggs vs. Taylor was an event held on August 13, 2010 at the Dodge Theatre in Phoenix, Arizona.

=== Results ===
Main Card
Weight class				Method	Round	Time	Notes
	Joe Riggs	def.	Louis Taylor	TKO (Submission to punches)	3	2:07
	Miesha Tate	def.	Hitomi Akano	Decision (Unanimous)	3	3:00
	Ryan Couture	def.	Lucas Stark	Submission (Triangle Choke)	1	1:15
	Hitomi Akano	def.	Carina Damm	Submission (Triangle Armbar)	2	1:48
	Miesha Tate	def.	Maiju Kujala	Decision (Unanimous)	2	3:00
	Liz Carmouche	def.	Colleen Schneider	Decision (Unanimous)	2	3:00
	Chris Gruetzemacher	def.	Ryan Diaz	TKO (Doctor Stoppage)	1	N/A
	Jason Richey	def.	Edmond Xhelili	Decision (Majority)	3	3:00
	Joel Champion	def.	Sean Scott	KO (Punches)	1	1:06
	Robb Anderson	def.	Alonzo Fears-Dull	Decision (Unanimous)	3	3:00
	Andres Acuna	def.	Edwin Louis	Decision (Unanimous)	3	3:00
	Frankie Saenz	def.	Jace Crawford	Decision (Unanimous)	3	3:00

== Bracket ==
Semi finais
(Brazil)	Carina Damm	2
(Japan)	Hitomi Akano	SUB
(United States)	Miesha Tate	UD
(Finland)	Maiju Kujala	3

Final
(United States)	Miesha Tate	UD
(Japan)	Hitomi Akano	3

== Strikeforce: Houston ==
Strikeforce: Houston was an event held on August 21, 2010 at the Toyota Center in Houston, Texas.

=== Results ===
Main Card
Weight class				Method	Round	Time	Notes
Light Heavyweight	Rafael Cavalcante	def.	Muhammed Lawal (c)	TKO (Punches and Elbows)	3	1:14	(Note: For the Light Heavyweight Championship.)
Middleweight	Ronaldo Souza	def.	Tim Kennedy	Decision (Unanimous)	5	5:00	(Note: For the Middleweight Championship.)
Lightweight	K. J. Noons	def.	Jorge Gurgel	TKO (Punches)	2	0:19
Heavyweight	Chad Griggs	def.	Bobby Lashley	TKO (Retirement)	2	5:00
Sherdog.com Live Stream
Welterweight	Andre Galvao	def.	Jorge Patino	TKO (Punches)	3	2:45
Heavyweight	Daniel Cormier	def.	Jason Riley	Submission (Punches)	1	1:02
Preliminary Card
Light Heavyweight	Artenas Young	def.	Chad Cook	Decision (Unanimous)	3	3:00
Bantamweight	Chad Robichaux	def.	Humberto DeLeon	Decision (Split)	3	3:00
Lightweight	Rey Trujillo	def.	Jose Santibanez	TKO (Punches)	1	0:28
Lightweight	Adam Schindler	def.	Kierre Gooch	Submission (Rear-Naked Choke)	1	1:58
Featherweight	Vinicius Magalhaes	def.	Rocky Long	Decision (Unanimous)	3	3:00

== Strikeforce: Diaz vs. Noons II ==
Strikeforce Challengers: Evangelista vs. Aina
- Promotion: Strikeforce
- Date: May 15, 2010
- Venue: Save Mart Center
- City: Fresno, California
- Attendance: 2,322

Event chronology
Strikeforce: Shamrock vs. Diaz	Strikeforce Challengers: Evangelista vs. Aina	Strikeforce: Lawler vs. Shields

Strikeforce: Diaz vs. Noons II was an event held on October 9, 2010 at the HP Pavilion at San Jose in San Jose, California.

=== Results ===
Main card
Weight class				Method	Round	Time	Notes
Welterweight	Nick Diaz (c)	def	K. J. Noons	Decision (unanimous) (48–47, 49–47, 49–46)	5	5:00	(Note: For the Welterweight Championship.)
Women's Bantamweight	Marloes Coenen	def	Sarah Kaufman (c)	Submission (armbar)	3	1:59	(Note: For the Women's Bantamweight Championship)
Lightweight	Josh Thomson	def	Gesias Cavalcante	Decision (unanimous) (29–28, 29–28, 30–27)	3	5:00
Welterweight	Tyron Woodley	def	André Galvão	TKO (punches)	1	1:48
Preliminary card
Welterweight	James Terry	def	David Marshall	Decision (unanimous)	3	5:00
Middleweight	Josh McDonald	def	Ron Keslar	Decision (unanimous)	3	5:00
Lightweight	Jess Bouscal	def	Luis Mendoza	Submission (arm-triangle choke)	2	3:00

== Strikeforce Challengers: Bowling vs. Voelker ==
Strikeforce Challengers: Bowling vs. Voelker
- Promotion: Strikeforce
- Date: October 22, 2010
- Venue: Save Mart Center
- City: Fresno, California

Event chronology
Strikeforce: Shamrock vs. Diaz	Strikeforce Challengers: Bowling vs. Voelker	Strikeforce: Lawler vs. Shields

Strikeforce Challengers: Bowling vs. Voelker was an event held on October 22, 2010 at the Save Mart Center in Fresno, California.

=== Results ===
Main Card
Weight class				Method	Round	Time	Notes
	Bobby Voelker	def.	Roger Bowling	TKO (Punches)	2	3:58
	Lavar Johnson	def.	Virgil Zwicker	KO (Punches)	1	2:17
	Billy Evangelista	def.	Waachiim Spiritwolf	Decision (Unanimous)	3	5:00
	Julia Budd	def.	Shana Nelson	TKO (Punches)	2	2:51
	John Devine	def.	Brandon Cash	Submission (Rear-Naked Choke)	1	3:05
	David Douglas	def.	Dominic Clark	TKO (Punches)	2	2:33
	Paul Ruiz	def.	Gregg Baker	Submission (Armbar)	1	1:23
	Richard Parra III	def.	Avery Kaykeo	KO (Punch)	2	0:56
	Chris Bonilla	def.	Alvaro Corral	Submission (Triangle Choke)	1	1:26
	Keith Cutrone	def.	Brandon Horton	Submission (Armbar)	1	0:16
	Matthew Perez	def.	Nathan Roberts	TKO (Punches)	3	1:17
	Christian Buron	def.	Mike Gonzales	Decision (Split)	3	2:00

== Strikeforce Challengers: Wilcox vs. Ribeiro ==
Strikeforce Challengers: Wilcox vs. Ribeiro
- Promotion: Strikeforce
- Date: November 19, 2010
- Venue: Jackson Convention Complex
- City: Jackson, Mississippi

Event chronology
Strikeforce: Shamrock vs. Diaz	Strikeforce Challengers: Wilcox vs. Ribeiro	Strikeforce: Lawler vs. Shields

Strikeforce Challengers: Wilcox vs. Ribeiro was an event held on November 19, 2010 at the Jackson Convention Complex in Jackson, Mississippi.

=== Results ===
Main Card
Weight class				Method	Round	Time	Notes
	Justin Wilcox	def.	Vítor Ribeiro	Decision (Unanimous)	3	5:00
	Ovince St. Preux	def.	Antwain Britt	Decision (Unanimous)	3	5:00
	Marius Zaromskis	vs.	Waachiim Spiritwolf	NC (Spiritwolf Poked in the Eye)	1	0:06
	Liz Carmouche	def.	Jan Finney	TKO (Punches)	3	1:30
	Caros Fodor	def.	Derek Getzel	Submission (D'Arce Choke)	1	4:39
	Wes Shivers	def.	Goldman Butler	KO (Punch)	1	2:15
	Jacob Noe	def.	Wes Little	Decision (Unanimous)	3	5:00
	Jeremiah Riggs	def.	James Sharp	Decision (Unanimous)	3	5:00
	Anthony Mitchell	def.	Jeffrey Hedgepeth	Submission (Guillotine Choke)	1	2:02
	Thomas Vasquez	def.	Brian Hall	TKO (Punches)	3	2:11
	Joel Cooper	def.	Brian Burse	Submission (Armbar)	1	1:27
	Ken DuBose	def.	Travis Robertson	Decision (Unanimous)	3	5:00

== Strikeforce: Henderson vs. Babalu II ==
Strikeforce: Henderson vs. Babalu II was an event held on December 4, 2010 at the Scottrade Center in St. Louis, Missouri.

=== Results ===
Main Card
Weight class				Method	Round	Time	Notes
Light Heavyweight	Dan Henderson	def	Renato Sobral	KO (punches)	1	1:53
Welterweight	Paul Daley	def	Scott Smith	KO (punch)	1	2:09
Heavyweight	Antônio Silva	def	Mike Kyle	TKO (punches)	2	2:49
Middleweight	Robbie Lawler	def	Matt Lindland	KO (punches)	1	0:50
Light Heavyweight	Ovince St. Preux	def	Benji Radach	Decision (unanimous) (30–27, 30–26, 30–25)	3	5:00	(Note: Preux defeated Radach via Decision (unanimous) (30–27, 30–26, 30–25).)
Preliminary Card
Catchweight (130 lb)	J.W. Wright	def	Josh Epps	Submission (guillotine choke)	1	1:29
Middleweight	Booker DeRousse	def	Coltin Cole	TKO (strikes)	2	3:04
Light Heavyweight	Mike Glenn	def	Lee Brousseau	TKO (strikes)	1	2:00
Lightweight	Matt Ricehouse	def	Tom Aaron	Decision (unanimous) (29–28, 30–27, 29–28)	3	5:00
Middleweight	Cortez Coleman	def	Lucas Lopes	Submission (guillotine choke)	1	2:04
Light Heavyweight	Patrick Cummins	def	Terrell Brown	TKO (strikes)	1	2:44
Lightweight	Justin Lawrence	def	Max Martyniouk	Technical decision (30–27, 30–27, 30–27).	3	5:00	(Note: The fight was stopped in round 3 due to an accidental soccer kick by Lawrence.)
Welterweight	Wayne Phillips	def	Fernando Bettega	Decision (split) (29–28, 29–28, 28–29)	3	5:00

== See also ==
- List of Strikeforce champions
- List of Strikeforce events
