= Antwain Britt =

American mixed martial arts fighter

- Born: May 9, 1978 (age 48); Hampton Roads, Virginia, United States
- Other names: The Juggernaut
- Height: 6 ft 1 in (1.85 m)
- Weight: 184 lb (83 kg; 13.1 st)
- Division: Middleweight; Light Heavyweight; Heavyweight; Super Heavyweight
- Reach: 77 in (196 cm)
- Style: Wrestling, Boxing
- Stance: Orthodox
- Fighting out of: Virginia Beach, Virginia, United States
- Team: Carlson Gracie Team Virginia Beach

Professional boxing record
- Total: 1
- Wins: 1
- By knockout: 1

Mixed martial arts record
- Total: 17
- Wins: 11
- By knockout: 9
- By decision: 2
- Losses: 6
- By knockout: 2
- By submission: 2
- By decision: 2

Other information
- Boxing record from BoxRec
- Mixed martial arts record from Sherdog

Antwain Britt (born May 9, 1978) is an American professional mixed martial artist who last competed in Strikeforce's Middleweight division. While perhaps best known for his stint with the Strikeforce organization, he also fought in YAMMA Pit Fighting, and was a contestant on The Ultimate Fighter 8.

== Background ==
Britt was born and raised in the Hampton Roads of Virginia, but also lived in Baltimore, Maryland. He attended Indian River High School in Chesapeake, Virginia where he was an All-State football player and wrestler and then continued his wrestling career at Old Dominion University. After college, Britt was out of shape and began training in mixed martial arts as a way to lose weight.

== Mixed martial arts career ==
=== Early career ===
He made his debut in the Heavyweight division but after a few fights dropped to Light Heavyweight. He was a contestant on The Ultimate Fighter 8, winning by majority decision over Ryan Jimmo, but was replaced by Eliot Marshall due to sustaining a broken hand in the fight. After beating UFC veteran Antonio Mendes at Shine Fights 1: Genesis, Antwain took part in VFC: A Night Of Vengeance grand prix tournament. He beat another UFC veteran in Carmelo Marrero, and also beat Rich Hale but in the finals he lost to Rodney Wallace.

=== Strikeforce ===
Britt signed with Strikeforce in September 2009. He currently trains with Carlson Gracie black belt Carlos Carvahlo. His Strikeforce debut came against Scott Lighty which Britt won by TKO.

Britt next fight came against Rafael Cavalcante. The winner of the bout between Britt-Cavalcante will become the number one contender to the Strikeforce Light Heavyweight Championship against Muhammed Lawal. Britt lost via KO (punches) at Strikeforce: Heavy Artillery.

His next fight was to come against Ovince St. Preux at Strikeforce Challengers: Wilcox vs. Ribeiro. Britt lost by unanimous decision. On November 18, 2011, Britt made his Middleweight debut as the headliner for Strikeforce Challengers: Britt vs. Sayers. Britt lost this fight by KO 28 seconds into the first round. This was Britt's third loss in a row and only the second time in his career that he had been knocked out.

== Mixed martial arts record ==
Professional record breakdown
17 matches	11 wins	6 losses
By knockout	9	2
By submission	0	2
By decision	2	2

Res.	Record	Opponent	Method	Event	Date	Round	Time	Location	Notes
Loss	11–6	Lumumba Sayers	KO (punches)	Strikeforce Challengers: Britt vs. Sayers	November 18, 2011	1	0:28	Las Vegas, Nevada, United States	Middleweight debut.
Loss	11–5	Ovince St. Preux	Decision (unanimous)	Strikeforce Challengers: Wilcox vs. Ribeiro	November 19, 2010	3	5:00	Jackson, Mississippi, United States	
Loss	11–4	Rafael Cavalcante	KO (punches)	Strikeforce: Heavy Artillery	May 15, 2010	1	3:45	St. Louis, Missouri, United States	Strikeforce Light Heavyweight title eliminator.
Win	11–3	Scott Lighty	TKO (doctor stoppage)	Strikeforce: Evolution	December 19, 2009	1	5:00	San Jose, California, United States	
Loss	10–3	Rodney Wallace	Submission (armbar)	VFC: A Night Of Vengeance	September 5, 2009	1	3:59	Oranjestad, Aruba	
Win	10–2	Rich Hale	Decision (majority)	VFC: A Night Of Vengeance	September 5, 2009	2	5:00	Oranjestad, Aruba	
Win	9–2	Carmelo Marrero	Decision (unanimous)	VFC: A Night Of Vengeance	September 5, 2009	2	5:00	Oranjestad, Aruba	
Win	8–2	Antonio Mendes	TKO (punches)	Shine Fights 1: Genesis	May 9, 2009	1	0:08	Columbus, Ohio, United States	
Loss	7–2	Jamal Patterson	Submission (guillotine choke)	UWC 5: Man O' War	February 21, 2009	1	0:44	Fairfax, Virginia, United States	
Win	7–1	Robert Turner	TKO (punches)	Cagefest Xtreme: Evolution	November 15, 2008	2		Norfolk, Virginia, United States	
Win	6–1	Terry Cohens	TKO (punches)	UWC 4: Confrontation	October 11, 2008	1	0:31	Fairfax, Virginia, United States	
Win	5–1	Wayne Cole	TKO	C3 Fights: Showdown 2	August 16, 2008	1	0:51	Cherokee, North Carolina, United States	Light Heavyweight debut.
Loss	4–1	Bryan Vetell	Decision (unanimous)	YAMMA Pit Fighting	April 11, 2008	1	5:00	Atlantic City, New Jersey, United States	
Win	4–0	Isaiah Larson	TKO	Smash MMA	November 30, 2007	1		Virginia, United States	
Win	3–0	Sam Holloway	KO	Wild Bill's: Fight Night 12	November 2, 2007	1	1:23	Atlanta, Georgia, United States	
Win	2–0	Patrick Barrantine	KO (punches)	MMAC: The Revolution	May 12, 2007	1	1:12	Washington, D.C., United States	
Win	1–0	Soloman Sands	KO (punches)	Combat Sports Challenge	March 24, 2007	1	0:43	Virginia, United States	

== Professional boxing record ==
Result	Record	Opponent	Method	Date	Round	Time	Location	Notes
Win	1-0	Antonio King	KO	September 8, 2010	1	-	Virginia Beach, Virginia	
