= Strikeforce: Heavy Artillery =

Strikeforce mixed martial arts event in 2010

- The poster for Strikeforce: Heavy Artillery
- Promotion: Strikeforce
- Date: May 15, 2010
- Venue: Scottrade Center
- City: St. Louis, Missouri, United States
- Attendance: 8,136

Event chronology
Strikeforce: Nashville	Strikeforce: Heavy Artillery	Strikeforce: Los Angeles

Strikeforce: Heavy Artillery was a mixed martial arts event held by Strikeforce on May 15, 2010, in St. Louis, Missouri, United States at the Scottrade Center. The event aired live on Showtime in the United States and on Super Channel in Canada.

== Background ==
Fedor Emelianenko was rumored to face Fabrício Werdum at this event, but the match was later held in June at Strikeforce: Fedor vs. Werdum, where Werdum won by first round submission.

After a long period of ambiguity, Strikeforce officials confirmed that the main event was for Alistair Overeem's Heavyweight Championship, which he had never defended since winning it in November 2007.

The winner of the Antwain Britt vs. Rafael Cavalcante bout was promised the next shot at Muhammed Lawal's Light Heavyweight Championship.

Bobby Lashley, who was originally set to fight on the Strikeforce: Nashville card, was rumored to have fought on this card, however he was moved to the card for Strikeforce: Los Angeles.

Norifumi Yamamoto was originally announced to fight Federico Lopez on the card, but was later pulled out by Dream. The match was rescheduled for Dream 14 two weeks later, where Yamamoto defeated Lopez by first-round TKO.

The event drew an estimated 308,000 viewers, with a peak at 448,000 on Showtime.

== Results ==
Main Card
Weight class				Method	Round	Time	Notes
Heavyweight	Alistair Overeem (c)	def.	Brett Rogers	TKO (punches)	1	3:40	(Note: For the Strikeforce Heavyweight Championship.)
Heavyweight	Antonio Silva	def.	Andrei Arlovski	Decision (unanimous)	3	5:00
Middleweight	Ronaldo Souza	def.	Joey Villasenor	Decision (unanimous)	3	5:00
Light Heavyweight	Roger Gracie	def.	Kevin Randleman	Submission (rear-naked choke)	2	4:10
Light Heavyweight	Rafael Cavalcante	def.	Antwain Britt	KO (punches)	1	3:45
Preliminary Card
Lightweight	Lyle Beerbohm	def.	Vítor Ribeiro	Decision (split)	3	5:00
Catchweight (172 lb)	Jesse Finney	def.	Justin DeMoney	Submission (guillotine choke)	1	3:22
Lightweight	Matt Ricehouse	def.	Greg Wilson Jr.	Submission (rear-naked choke)	3	0:45
Catchweight (157 lb)	Tom Aaron	def.	Erik Steenberg	Submission (guillotine choke)	1	0:56
Light Heavyweight	Francisco France	def.	Lee Brousseau	Submission (rear-naked choke)	1	1:27
Welterweight	Michael Chandler	def.	Salvador Woods	Submission (rear-naked choke)	1	0:59
Light Heavyweight	Darryl Cobb	def.	Booker DeRousse	Decision (split)	3	5:00

== See also ==
- Strikeforce (mixed martial arts)
- List of Strikeforce champions
- List of Strikeforce events
- 2010 in Strikeforce
