= Strikeforce: Houston =

Strikeforce mixed martial arts event in 2010

- The poster for Strikeforce: Houston
- Promotion: Strikeforce
- Date: August 21, 2010
- Venue: Toyota Center
- City: Houston, Texas, United States
- Attendance: 8,635

Event chronology
Strikeforce: Fedor vs. Werdum	Strikeforce: Houston	Strikeforce: Diaz vs. Noons II

Strikeforce: Houston, was a mixed martial arts event held by Strikeforce on August 21, 2010 at the Toyota Center in Houston, Texas, United States.

== Background ==
After Jake Shields vacated the Strikeforce Middleweight Championship, there was much speculation that there would be a tournament for the title. However, Strikeforce announced that Ronaldo Souza and Tim Kennedy would fight for the championship at this event.

André Galvão was originally scheduled to face Nate Moore, however Jorge Patino stepped in on late notice for the injured Moore.

The Cormier/Riley and Galvão/Patino preliminary bouts streamed live on Sherdog.com.

This was the last Strikeforce event branded with their original logo. The promotion debuted their new & final logo at Strikeforce: Diaz vs. Noons II in October 2010.

The event drew an estimated 367,000 viewers, with a peak at 470,000 on Showtime.

== Results ==
Main Card
Weight class				Method	Round	Time	Notes
Light Heavyweight	Rafael Cavalcante	def.	Muhammed Lawal (c)	TKO (punches and elbows)	3	1:14	(Note: For the Strikeforce Light Heavyweight Championship.)
Middleweight	Ronaldo Souza	def.	Tim Kennedy	Decision (unanimous)	5	5:00	(Note: For the Strikeforce Middleweight Championship.)
Lightweight	K. J. Noons	def.	Jorge Gurgel	TKO (punches)	2	0:19
Heavyweight	Chad Griggs	def.	Bobby Lashley	TKO (retirement)	2	5:00
Sherdog.com Live Stream
Welterweight	Andre Galvao	def.	Jorge Patino	TKO (punches)	3	2:45
Heavyweight	Daniel Cormier	def.	Jason Riley	TKO (Submission to punches)	1	1:02
Preliminary Card
Light Heavyweight	Artenas Young	def.	Chad Cook	Decision (unanimous)	3	3:00
Bantamweight	Chad Robichaux	def.	Humberto DeLeon	Decision (split)	3	3:00
Lightweight	Rey Trujillo	def.	Jose Santibanez	TKO (punches)	1	0:28
Lightweight	Adam Schindler	def.	Kierre Gooch	Submission (rear-naked choke)	1	1:58
Featherweight	Vinicius Magalhães	def.	Rocky Long	Decision (unanimous)	3	3:00

== See also ==
- Strikeforce (mixed martial arts)
- List of Strikeforce champions
- List of Strikeforce events
- 2010 in Strikeforce
