= Strikeforce: Nashville =

Strikeforce mixed martial arts event in 2010

- The poster for Strikeforce: Nashville
- Promotion: Strikeforce
- Date: April 17, 2010
- Venue: Bridgestone Arena
- City: Nashville, Tennessee, United States
- Attendance: 8,196

Event chronology
Strikeforce: Miami	Strikeforce: Nashville	Strikeforce: Heavy Artillery

Strikeforce: Nashville was a mixed martial arts event produced by Strikeforce, it took place on April 17, 2010, at the Bridgestone Arena in Nashville, Tennessee, United States and broadcast domestically on CBS.

== Background ==
The main event was originally rumored to be Fedor Emelianenko taking on Fabrício Werdum. However, the fight was moved to a future event.

Bobby Lashley was expected to fight on the card, as the promotion had already submitted an opponent for Lashley and was awaiting from the Tennessee Athletic Commission. According to Strikeforce CEO Scott Coker, the bout would likely be the fourth bout on the CBS televised portion of the event. On April 5, Lashley confirmed that he would not appear on the card since Strikeforce officials could not guarantee an appearance on the televised portion of the card due to time constraints.

The event drew an estimated 2,900,000 viewers on CBS.

== Nashville brawl ==
The event was marred by a post-fight brawl following the main event. During Jake Shields' post-fight interview, Jason Miller gained access to the cage and interrupted Shields, asking, "Where's my rematch, buddy?" After both Gilbert Melendez and Shields pushed Miller away, Nick Diaz then threw the initial punch to start the full-scale brawl. Members of the Cesar Gracie Jiu-Jitsu camp, including Melendez, Nick and Nate Diaz attacked Miller, while Miller was restrained on the canvas by members of Diaz's camp. The fight was then broken up by referees, members of Dan Henderson's corner and members of security. The brawl resulted in CBS cancelling its half of Strikeforce's television contract: MMA would not return to network television until November 2011 with UFC on Fox: Velasquez vs. Dos Santos.

== Results ==
Main Card
Weight class				Method	Round	Time	Notes
Middleweight	Jake Shields (c)	def.	Dan Henderson	Decision (unanimous) (48-45, 49-45, 49-46)	5	5:00	(Note: For the Strikeforce Middleweight Championship.)
Lightweight	Gilbert Melendez (c)	def.	Shinya Aoki	Decision (unanimous) (50-45, 50-45, 50-45)	5	5:00	(Note: For the Strikeforce Lightweight Championship.)
Light Heavyweight	Muhammed Lawal	def.	Gegard Mousasi (c)	Decision (unanimous) (49-45, 49-45, 49-45)	5	5:00	(Note: For the Strikeforce Light Heavyweight Championship.)
Preliminary Card
Light Heavyweight	Ovince St. Preux	def.	Chris Hawk	TKO (Punches)	1	0:47
Welterweight	Andy Uhrich	def.	Dustin West	Submission (rear-naked choke)	1	1:36
Middleweight	Jason Miller	def.	Tim Stout	TKO (punches)	1	3:09
Light Heavyweight	Cale Yarbrough	def.	Josh Schockman	TKO (knee and punches)	2	1:01
Middleweight	Zach Underwood	def.	Hunter Worsham	Decision (unanimous)	3	5:00
Flyweight	Dustin Ortiz	def.	Justin Pennington	Submission (rear-naked choke)	1	4:27
Featherweight	Cody Floyd	def.	Thomas Campbell	KO (knee)	3	0:41

== See also ==
- Strikeforce
- List of Strikeforce champions
- List of Strikeforce events
- 2010 in Strikeforce
