= Strikeforce: Diaz vs. Noons II =

Strikeforce mixed martial arts event in 2010

- The poster for Strikeforce: Diaz vs. Noons II
- Promotion: Strikeforce
- Date: October 9, 2010
- Venue: HP Pavilion
- City: San Jose, California, United States
- Attendance: 7,559
- Total gate: $528,466

Event chronology
Strikeforce: Houston	Strikeforce: Diaz vs. Noons II	Strikeforce: Henderson vs. Babalu II

Strikeforce: Diaz vs. Noons II, was a mixed martial arts event held by Strikeforce on October 9, 2010 at the HP Pavilion in San Jose, California, United States. The event aired live on the Showtime cable network.

== Background ==
This event featured the rematch of Nick Diaz and K. J. Noons after the first bout was stopped because of a cut on the head of Diaz for the Elite XC 160 lbs championship.

As part of the undercard, Strikeforce hosted the Bay Area Regional Finals of the California Amateur MMA Organization.

Strikeforce debuted their final logo and branding at this event.

The event drew an estimated 350,000 viewers, with a peak at 509,000 on Showtime.

== Results ==
Main card
Weight class				Method	Round	Time	Notes
Welterweight	Nick Diaz (c)	def.	K. J. Noons	Decision (unanimous) (48–47, 49–47, 49–46)	5	5:00	(Note: For the Strikeforce Welterweight Championship.)
Women's Bantamweight	Marloes Coenen	def.	Sarah Kaufman (c)	Submission (armbar)	3	1:59	(Note: For the Strikeforce Women's Bantamweight Championship)
Lightweight	Josh Thomson	def.	Gesias Cavalcante	Decision (unanimous) (29–28, 29–28, 30–27)	3	5:00
Welterweight	Tyron Woodley	def.	André Galvão	TKO (punches)	1	1:48
Preliminary card
Welterweight	James Terry	def.	David Marshall	Decision (unanimous)	3	5:00
Middleweight	Josh McDonald	def.	Ron Keslar	Decision (unanimous)	3	5:00
Lightweight	Jess Bouscal	def.	Luis Mendoza	Submission (arm-triangle choke)	2	3:00

== Reported payout ==
- Nick Diaz: $50,000 (no win bonus) def. K. J. Noons $10,000
- Josh Thomson: $50,000 (no win bonus) def. Gesias "JZ" Cavalcante: $40,000
- Marloes Coenen: $3,000 ($1,000 win bonus) def. Sarah Kaufman: $20,000
- Tyron Woodley: $15,000 ($7,500 win bonus) def. André Galvão: $10,000
- James Terry: $3,000 ($1,500 win bonus) def. David Marshall: $1,500
- Josh McDonald: $3,000 ($1,500 win bonus) def. Ron Keslar: $1,500
- Jess Bouscal: $3,000 ($1,500 win bonus) def. Luis Mendoza: $1,500

== See also ==
- Strikeforce (mixed martial arts)
- List of Strikeforce champions
- List of Strikeforce events
- 2010 in Strikeforce
