= Ovince Saint Preux =

American mixed martial arts fighter

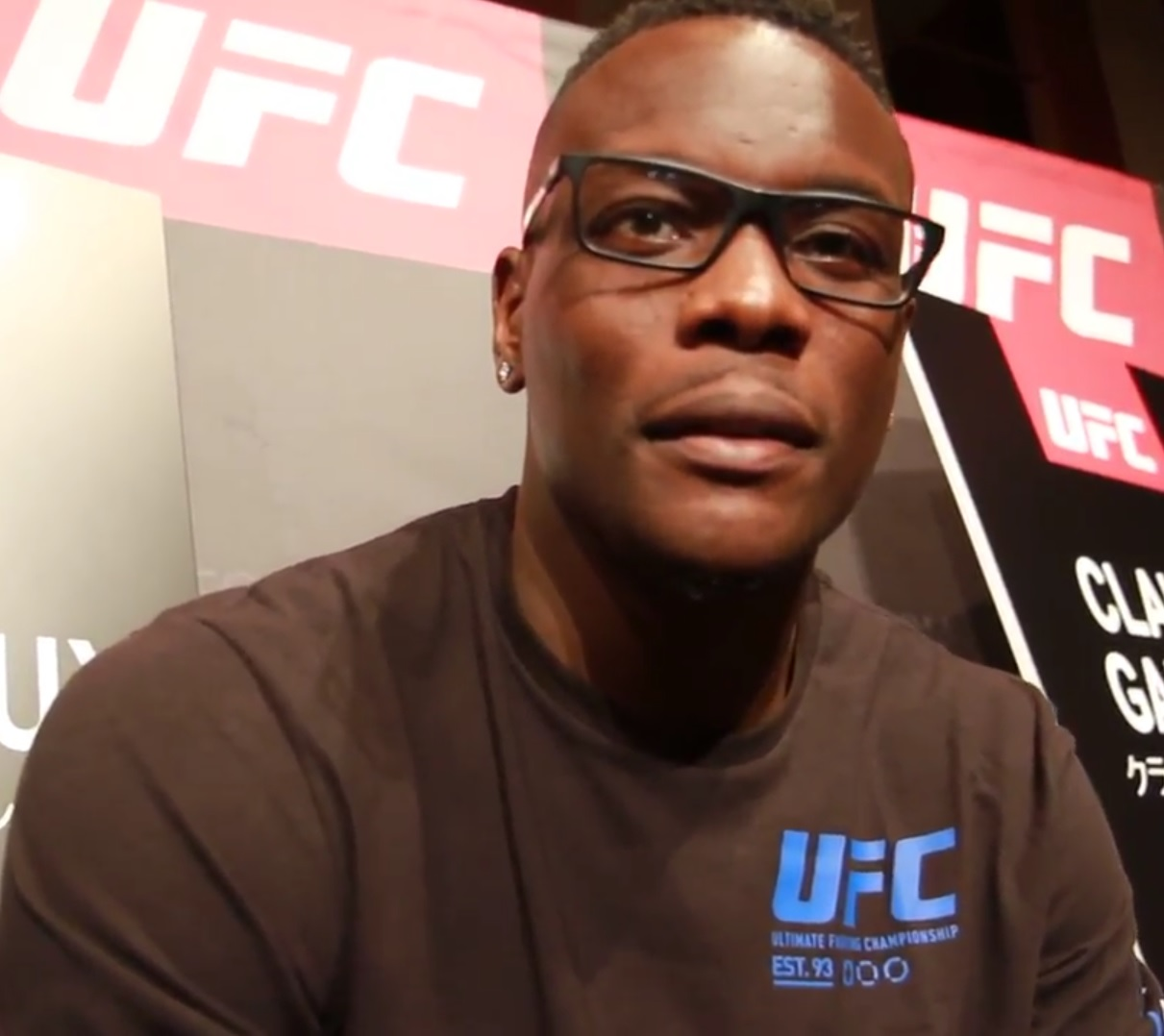
- Saint Preux in 2017
- Born: April 8, 1983 (age 43); Immokalee, Florida, U.S.
- Other names: OSP
- Nationality: American and Haitian
- Height: 6 ft 3 in (1.91 m)
- Weight: 205 lb (93 kg; 14 st 9 lb)
- Division: Light heavyweight (2008–present); Heavyweight (2020–2021)
- Reach: 80 in (203 cm)
- Stance: Southpaw
- Fighting out of: Knoxville, Tennessee, U.S.
- Team: Knoxville Martial Arts Academy
- Rank: Brown belt in Brazilian Jiu-Jitsu under Rafaello Oliveira
- Years active: 2008–present

Mixed martial arts record
- Total: 45
- Wins: 27
- By knockout: 12
- By submission: 8
- By decision: 7
- Losses: 18
- By knockout: 5
- By submission: 4
- By decision: 9

Amateur record
- Total: 5
- Wins: 5
- By knockout: 2
- By submission: 2
- By decision: 1
- Losses: 0

Other information
- University: University of Tennessee
- Mixed martial arts record from Sherdog

Ovince Saint Preux (born April 8, 1983) is an American professional mixed martial artist who most notably competed in the light heavyweight and heavyweight divisions of the UFC, challenging once for the interim UFC Light Heavyweight Championship. A professional competitor since 2008, Saint Preux has also formerly competed for Strikeforce, the XFC, and Shark Fights. He is known for his unorthodox fighting style and has gained notability and notoriety for having won four fights using the rare Von Flue choke submission out of eight finishes in UFC history, leading to fans renaming it to the "Von Preux choke".

== Background ==
Saint Preux was born in Immokalee, Florida, to Haitian immigrant parents. He attended Immokalee High School in Immokalee, Florida, where he wrestled, played defensive end for the football team, and ran track. As a wrestler, he compiled a record of 26–1, and was the state's 1A runner-up in his weight class. During his senior year in football, he registered 75 tackles, including a school-record 18 sacks, and was named All-State. In track, he competed in the 110-meter hurdles, the 300-meter hurdles, the discus throw, and the 4x400 relay.

Saint Preux played college football for the Tennessee Volunteers from 2001 to 2004. After redshirting in 2001, he played primarily as a reserve at both defensive end and linebacker. He earned varsity letters in 2002 and 2004, appearing in seventeen games during his college career. He graduated in 2004 with a degree in sociology, and began to train in kickboxing and submission grappling at the age of 21.

After two unsuccessful attempts at professional football, Saint Preux gave up the sport and began to take an interest in martial arts as a form of training. Saint Preux, who currently trains at Knoxville Martial Arts Academy in Knoxville, Tennessee, began to fight professionally at the suggestion of his coach.

Saint Preux attributes his confidence in the ring to his membership in Omega Psi Phi fraternity.

== Mixed martial arts career ==
=== Early career ===
Saint Preux compiled an undefeated amateur MMA record of 5–0 before making his professional MMA debut at VFC 1 against Rodney Wallace, which he lost by decision. In his second MMA match, he suffered another decision loss. His next match came against Robert Turner which he won by a brutal head kick at XFC 7: School of Hard Knox. Saint Preux was a runner-up for Inside MMA's Submission of The Year for 2009 with a calf slicer against Ombey Mobley, but was beaten by Toby Imada's reverse triangle.

=== Strikeforce ===
In June 2010, Saint Preux signed a multi-fight deal with Strikeforce. His debut match came against Chris Hawk at Strikeforce: Nashville, which he won due to TKO (punches) in the first round.

After knocking out UFC veteran Jason Day in eight seconds outside the Strikeforce organization, he returned to fight Antwain Britt in his second Strikeforce fight on a ShoMMA Strikeforce Challengers event. He won by unanimous decision.

Saint Preux returned to action less than a month after his win over Britt to fight UFC and Strikeforce veteran Benji Radach on the main card of Strikeforce: Henderson vs. Babalu II. Saint Preux defeated Radach via unanimous decision.

Saint Preux competed in his third Strikeforce fight in less than seven weeks and faced Abongo Humphrey on January 7, 2011, at Strikeforce Challengers: Woodley vs. Saffiedine. He won the fight via unanimous decision. This three-fight series over a seven-week period marked the only time a Strikeforce fighter competed on three successive shows.

Saint Preux faced Joe Cason on July 22, 2011, at Strikeforce Challengers: Voelker vs. Bowling III. He won the fight via submission to strikes in the first round. In his post-fight interview, Saint Preux asked for either Renato Sobral or Gegard Mousasi as his next opponent.

Saint Preux next fought Gegard Mousasi on December 17, 2011, at Strikeforce: Melendez vs. Masvidal. He lost the fight via unanimous decision.

Saint Preux fought T. J. Cook on August 18, 2012, at Strikeforce: Rousey vs. Kaufman. He won the fight via third-round knockout with a punch. Saint Preux compiled a record of 5–1 within the promotion.

=== Ultimate Fighting Championship ===
==== 2013 ====
In January 2013, the Strikeforce organization was closed by its parent company Zuffa with a majority of the Strikeforce fighters being brought over to the Ultimate Fighting Championship.

For his UFC debut, Saint Preux faced fellow promotional newcomer Gian Villante on April 27, 2013, at UFC 159. The fight ended in unusual fashion as Saint Preux accidentally poked Villante in the right eye with his thumb and referee Kevin Mulhall immediately called an end to the fight after asking Villante if he could see. As a result of the injury, the fight went to the judges' scorecards and Saint Preux won a majority technical decision.

For his second bout with the promotion, Saint Preux faced Cody Donovan on August 17, 2013, at UFC Fight Night 26. He won the fight via knockout at 2:07 in the first round.

==== 2014 ====
Saint Preux was briefly linked to a bout against Thiago Silva on January 15, 2014, at UFC Fight Night 35. However, Silva pulled out of the bout less than 24 hours after the announcement. The match against Silva was rescheduled for March 15, 2014 at UFC 171. However, the rescheduled bout was cancelled on February 7, 2014, after Silva was arrested by Florida police on attempted murder charges. Saint Preux instead fought Nikita Krylov at the event, winning in the first round with a Von Flue choke. The rare submission win also earned Saint Preux his first Performance of the Night bonus award.

For his fourth fight, Saint Preux faced Ryan Jimmo on June 14, 2014, at UFC 174. He won the fight in the second round when Jimmo verbally submitted due to a broken arm as a result of blocking one of Saint Preux's kicks.

Saint Preux faced Ryan Bader on August 16, 2014, in the main event at UFC Fight Night 47. He lost the fight via unanimous decision.

Saint Preux was expected to face Rafael Cavalcante on November 8, 2014, at UFC Fight Night 56. However, Cavalcante pulled out of the bout citing injury and was replaced by Francimar Barroso. However, on October 29, it was announced that Saint Preux would step up to replace an injured Jimi Manuwa in the main event against Maurício Rua. Despite being the underdog and fighting in Rua's home country of Brazil, Saint Preux won the fight via knockout just 34 seconds into the first round. Shogun's loss to Saint Preux was the fastest defeat of his professional career. The win also earned Saint Preux his second Performance of the Night bonus award.

==== 2015 ====
Saint Preux faced Patrick Cummins on April 18, 2015, at UFC on Fox 15. He won the fight via knockout in the first round.

Saint Preux faced Glover Teixeira on August 8, 2015, at UFC Fight Night 73. He lost the back-and-forth fight by submission in the third round. Both participants were awarded Fight of the Night honors.

==== 2016 ====
Saint Preux next faced Rafael Cavalcante on February 6, 2016, at UFC Fight Night 82. Despite Preux injuring his ankle in the first round, he won the fight by unanimous decision.

Saint Preux was tabbed as a short notice injury replacement to face Jon Jones for the interim light heavyweight title on April 23, 2016, at UFC 197 filling in for Daniel Cormier. Saint Preux lost via unanimous decision. Saint Preux's coach revealed that Saint Preux's arm was broken in the second round.

Saint Preux faced Jimi Manuwa on October 8, 2016, at UFC 204. He lost the fight via knockout in the second round.

==== 2017 ====
Saint Preux was expected to face Jan Błachowicz on February 4, 2017, at UFC Fight Night 104. However, Błachowicz was pulled from the fight in mid-January and replaced by promotional newcomer Volkan Oezdemir. Saint Preux lost the fight via split decision. 14 of 16 MMA media outlets scored the fight for Saint Preux.

Saint Preux faced Marcos Rogério de Lima on April 22, 2017, at UFC Fight Night 108. He defeated Lima due to a Von Flue choke submission in the second round. With this win, Saint Preux is the only fighter to successfully win via Von Flue choke twice in the UFC.

A rematch with Maurício Rua was expected to take place on September 23, 2017, at UFC Fight Night 117. The bout was changed after Rua suffered an injury and was promptly replaced with Yushin Okami. Saint Preux won the fight via Von Flue choke in the first round, marking his third win via this submission. This win earned him the Performance of the Night bonus.

Saint Preux stepped in to replace Patrick Cummins in a fight against Corey Anderson on November 4, 2017, at UFC 217. After winning the first round by landing the more effective strikes and rocking Anderson in the final seconds and losing the second round due to Anderson's wrestling, Saint Preux won the fight via a head kick knockout in the opening minute of the third round. This win earned him a $25,000 Performance of the Night bonus award.

==== 2018 ====
Saint Preux was expected to face Ilir Latifi on January 27, 2018, at UFC on Fox 27. However, Latifi was injured during a training session and he was forced to pull out from the bout. As a result, the bout was cancelled. The pair was rebooked and the bout took place on February 24, 2018, at UFC on Fox 28. Saint Preux lost the fight via technical submission in the first round.

Saint Preux faced Tyson Pedro on June 23, 2018, at UFC Fight Night 132. He won the fight via submission in the first round. This win earned him the Performance of the Night award.

Saint Preux faced Dominick Reyes on October 6, 2018, at UFC 229. He lost the fight via unanimous decision.

==== 2019 ====
Saint Preux was expected to face Misha Cirkunov on March 2, 2019, at UFC 235. However, on February 11, it was announced that Saint Preux suffered an injury and was pulled from the fight. He was replaced by Johnny Walker.

Saint Preux faced Nikita Krylov in a rematch on April 13, 2019, at UFC 236. He lost the fight via a submission due to a rear-naked choke in round two.

Saint Preux faced Michał Oleksiejczuk on September 28, 2019, at UFC Fight Night 160. He won the fight via submission due to a Von Flue choke in the second round; thereby extended his ending with this submission to a record four wins. The win also earned Saint Preux his sixth Performance of the Night bonus award.

Saint Preux was briefly liked to face Ryan Spann on February 8, 2020, at UFC 247. However, promotion matchmakers elected to go in another direction and the pairing was scrapped from the event.

Saint Preux was suspended for three months by USADA for tested positive for Ostarine and S-23, the family of selective androgen receptor modulators (SARMs), where the prohibited subsistence was found from a tainted supplement. The suspension retroactive from October 25, 2019, and he was eligible to fight again on January 25, 2020.

==== 2020 ====
Saint Preux was expected to face Shamil Gamzatov on April 25, 2020. However, Gamzatov was forced to pull from the event due to COVID-19 pandemic travel restriction, and Saint Preux was pulled from the event and was scheduled to meet Ion Cuțelaba at the event. However, on April 9, Dana White, the president of UFC announced that this event was postponed to a future date. On April 24, 2020, it was revealed that the fight against Cuțelaba was cancelled due to Cuțelaba not being allowed to leave his home country of Moldova due to a pandemic travel ban.

Saint Preux moved up to the heavyweight division and faced Ben Rothwell at the UFC Fight Night: Smith vs. Teixeira on May 13, 2020. He lost the fight via split decision.

Saint Preux was scheduled to face Shamil Gamzatov on April 25, 2020. However, Gamzatov was forced to pull from the event due to COVID-19 pandemic travel restriction The match was rescheduled on August 22, 2020, at UFC on ESPN 15. However, for unknown reason, Gamzatov was pulled from the bout and he was replaced by Alonzo Menifield. Just hours before the event was scheduled to begin, it was announced that the bout was canceled due to Saint Preux testing positive for COVID-19. The bout eventually took place on September 5, 2020, at UFC Fight Night 176. Saint Preux won the fight via knockout in the second round. This win earned him a Performance of the Night award.

Saint Preux faced Jamahal Hill on December 5, 2020, at UFC on ESPN 19. At the weigh-ins, he weighed in at 207.5 pounds, one and a half pounds over the light heavyweight non-title fight limit. The bout proceeded at a catchweight and Saint Preux was fined 20% of his individual purse, which went to his opponent Hill. He lost the fight via second-round TKO.

==== 2021 ====
Saint Preux was scheduled to face Maxim Grishin on June 26, 2021, at UFC Fight Night 190. However, Grishin withdrew from the bout due to visa issues and was replaced by Tanner Boser in a heavyweight bout. In the second round, Saint Preux secured a takedown, but Boser appeared to use the fence in order to assist himself back to his feet, with the referee giving him a warning. However, Saint Preux lost the fight by knockout moments later. Saint Preux later announced that he would be appealing the loss in hopes of overturning it to a no contest.

Saint Preux was scheduled to face Philipe Lins on November 13, 2021, at UFC Fight Night 197. However Saint Preux withdrew from the fight for undisclosed reasons and the bout was cancelled.

==== 2022 ====
Saint Preux had a rematch against Maurício Rua on May 7, 2022, at UFC 274. He won the fight via split decision.

Saint Preux was scheduled to face Alexander Gustafsson on December 10, 2022, at UFC 282. However, Gustafsson withdrew due to undisclosed reason and was briefly replaced by Philipe Lins. In turn, Lins withdrew from the bout due to an undisclosed reason and was replaced by UFC newcomer Antonio Trocoli. However, Trocoli withdrew due to visa issues. As a result, Saint Preux was pulled from the card as well due to the promotion being unable to find another replacement.

==== 2023 ====
The match between Saint Preux and Philipe Lins was rescheduled on February 18, 2023 at UFC Fight Night 219. He lost the fight via knockout in the first round.

Saint Preux was scheduled to face Ion Cuțelaba on August 5, 2023, at UFC on ESPN 50. However, the bout was cancelled on July 20 for unknown reasons.

In June 2023, Saint Preux was suspended for six months by USADA after testing positive for Dehydroandrosterone resulting from tainted supplements. He was eligible to fight again on December 17, 2023.

==== 2024 ====
Saint Preux faced Kennedy Nzechukwu on March 16, 2024 at, UFC Fight Night 239. He won the bout by split decision.

Saint Preux was scheduled to face Ryan Spann on September 7, 2024 at UFC Fight Night 242. However, Saint Preux withdrew from the fight due to an illness and the bout was moved to UFC 307 on October 5, 2024 as a result. Saint Preux lost the fight via a guillotine choke submission in the first round.

On October 7, 2024, following his most recent loss, it was reported that Saint Preux was removed from the UFC roster.

=== Post UFC ===
On December 27, 2024, it was reported that Saint Preux had signed with Global Fight League.

Saint Preux was scheduled to face former UFC Light Heavyweight Championship challenger Alexander Gustafsson on May 25, 2025 at GFL 2. However, all GFL events were cancelled indefinitely.

== Championships and accomplishments ==
=== Mixed martial arts ===
- Ultimate Fighting Championship
  - Performance of the Night (Seven times) vs. Nikita Krylov, Maurício Rua 1, Yushin Okami, Corey Anderson, Tyson Pedro, Michał Oleksiejczuk, and Alonzo Menifield
    - Tied (Donald Cerrone, Conor McGregor, Tom Aspinall, Carlos Prates & Song Yadong) for fourth most Performance of the Night bonuses in UFC history (7)
  - Fight of the Night (One time) vs. Glover Teixeira
    - Tied (Mauricio Rua & Jon Jones) for second most Post-Fight bonuses in UFC Light Heavyweight division history (8)
  - Most Von Flue choke submissions in UFC history (4)
  - Tied (Jon Jones & Misha Cirkunov) for third most submissions in UFC Light Heavyweight division history (5)
  - Second most finishes in UFC Light Heavyweight division history (11)
  - Most bouts in modern UFC Light Heavyweight division history (26)
  - Tied (Ryan Bader) for third most wins in UFC Light Heavyweight division history (15)
  - UFC.com Awards
    - 2017: Ranked #7 Submission of the Year vs. Yushin Okami
    - 2019: Ranked #5 Submission of the Year vs. Michał Oleksiejczuk
- King of The Cage
  - KOTC Amateur Light Heavyweight Tournament Champion
- MMA Junkie
  - 2015 April Knockout of the Month vs. Patrick Cummins
  - 2019 September Submission of the Month vs. Michał Oleksiejczuk
- CBS Sports
  - 2017 #5 Ranked UFC Knockout of the Year vs. Corey Anderson
- Yahoo Sports
  - 2014 #2 Ranked Finish of the Year vs. Nikita Krylov at UFC 171

== Mixed martial arts record ==
Professional record breakdown
45 matches	27 wins	18 losses
By knockout	12	5
By submission	8	4
By decision	7	9

Res.	Record	Opponent	Method	Event	Date	Round	Time	Location	Notes
Loss	27–18	Ryan Spann	Submission (guillotine choke)	UFC 307	October 5, 2024	1	1:35	Salt Lake City, Utah, United States	
Win	27–17	Kennedy Nzechukwu	Decision (split)	UFC Fight Night: Tuivasa vs. Tybura	March 16, 2024	3	5:00	Las Vegas, Nevada, United States	
Loss	26–17	Philipe Lins	KO (punches)	UFC Fight Night: Andrade vs. Blanchfield	February 18, 2023	1	0:49	Las Vegas, Nevada, United States	
Win	26–16	Maurício Rua	Decision (split)	UFC 274	May 7, 2022	3	5:00	Phoenix, Arizona, United States	
Loss	25–16	Tanner Boser	KO (punches)	UFC Fight Night: Gane vs. Volkov	June 26, 2021	2	2:31	Las Vegas, Nevada, United States	Heavyweight bout.
Loss	25–15	Jamahal Hill	TKO (punches)	UFC on ESPN: Hermansson vs. Vettori	December 5, 2020	2	3:37	Las Vegas, Nevada, United States	Catchweight (207.5 lb) bout; Saint Preux missed weight.
Win	25–14	Alonzo Menifield	KO (punch)	UFC Fight Night: Overeem vs. Sakai	September 5, 2020	2	4:07	Las Vegas, Nevada, United States	Return to Light Heavyweight. Performance of the Night.
Loss	24–14	Ben Rothwell	Decision (split)	UFC Fight Night: Smith vs. Teixeira	May 13, 2020	3	5:00	Jacksonville, Florida, United States	Heavyweight debut.
Win	24–13	Michał Oleksiejczuk	Submission (Von Flue choke)	UFC Fight Night: Hermansson vs. Cannonier	September 28, 2019	2	2:46	Copenhagen, Denmark	Performance of the Night.
Loss	23–13	Nikita Krylov	Submission (rear-naked choke)	UFC 236	April 13, 2019	2	2:31	Atlanta, Georgia, United States	
Loss	23–12	Dominick Reyes	Decision (unanimous)	UFC 229	October 6, 2018	3	5:00	Las Vegas, Nevada, United States	
Win	23–11	Tyson Pedro	Submission (straight armbar)	UFC Fight Night: Cowboy vs. Edwards	June 23, 2018	1	2:54	Kallang, Singapore	Performance of the Night.
Loss	22–11	Ilir Latifi	Submission (guillotine choke)	UFC on Fox: Emmett vs. Stephens	February 24, 2018	1	3:48	Orlando, Florida, United States	
Win	22–10	Corey Anderson	KO (head kick)	UFC 217	November 4, 2017	3	1:25	New York City, New York, United States	Performance of the Night.
Win	21–10	Yushin Okami	Technical Submission (Von Flue choke)	UFC Fight Night: Saint Preux vs. Okami	September 23, 2017	1	1:50	Saitama, Japan	Performance of the Night.
Win	20–10	Marcos Rogério de Lima	Submission (Von Flue choke)	UFC Fight Night: Swanson vs. Lobov	April 22, 2017	2	2:11	Nashville, Tennessee, United States	Catchweight (210 lb) bout; Lima missed weight.
Loss	19–10	Volkan Oezdemir	Decision (split)	UFC Fight Night: Bermudez vs. The Korean Zombie	February 4, 2017	3	5:00	Houston, Texas, United States	
Loss	19–9	Jimi Manuwa	KO (punches)	UFC 204	October 8, 2016	2	2:38	Manchester, England	
Loss	19–8	Jon Jones	Decision (unanimous)	UFC 197	April 23, 2016	5	5:00	Las Vegas, Nevada, United States	For the interim UFC Light Heavyweight Championship.
Win	19–7	Rafael Cavalcante	Decision (unanimous)	UFC Fight Night: Hendricks vs. Thompson	February 6, 2016	3	5:00	Las Vegas, Nevada, United States	
Loss	18–7	Glover Teixeira	Technical Submission (rear-naked choke)	UFC Fight Night: Teixeira vs. Saint Preux	August 8, 2015	3	3:10	Nashville, Tennessee, United States	Fight of the Night.
Win	18–6	Patrick Cummins	KO (punches)	UFC on Fox: Machida vs. Rockhold	April 18, 2015	1	4:54	Newark, New Jersey, United States	
Win	17–6	Maurício Rua	KO (punches)	UFC Fight Night: Shogun vs. Saint Preux	November 8, 2014	1	0:34	Uberlândia, Brazil	Performance of the Night.
Loss	16–6	Ryan Bader	Decision (unanimous)	UFC Fight Night: Bader vs. Saint Preux	August 16, 2014	5	5:00	Bangor, Maine, United States	
Win	16–5	Ryan Jimmo	Submission (kimura)	UFC 174	June 14, 2014	2	2:10	Vancouver, British Columbia, Canada	
Win	15–5	Nikita Krylov	Technical Submission (Von Flue choke)	UFC 171	March 15, 2014	1	1:29	Dallas, Texas, United States	Performance of the Night.
Win	14–5	Cody Donovan	KO (punches)	UFC Fight Night: Shogun vs. Sonnen	August 17, 2013	1	2:07	Boston, Massachusetts, United States	
Win	13–5	Gian Villante	Technical Decision (majority)	UFC 159	April 27, 2013	3	0:33	Newark, New Jersey, United States	Inadvertent eye poke rendered Villante unable to continue.
Win	12–5	T.J. Cook	KO (punch)	Strikeforce: Rousey vs. Kaufman	August 18, 2012	3	0:20	San Diego, California, United States	
Loss	11–5	Gegard Mousasi	Decision (unanimous)	Strikeforce: Melendez vs. Masvidal	December 17, 2011	3	5:00	San Diego, California, United States	
Win	11–4	Joe Cason	TKO (submission to punches)	Strikeforce Challengers: Voelker vs. Bowling III	July 22, 2011	1	1:12	Las Vegas, Nevada, United States	
Win	10–4	Ron Humphrey	Decision (unanimous)	Strikeforce Challengers: Woodley vs. Saffiedine	January 7, 2011	3	5:00	Nashville, Tennessee, United States	
Win	9–4	Benji Radach	Decision (unanimous)	Strikeforce: Henderson vs. Babalu II	December 4, 2010	3	5:00	St. Louis, Missouri, United States	
Win	8–4	Antwain Britt	Decision (unanimous)	Strikeforce Challengers: Wilcox vs. Ribeiro	November 19, 2010	3	5:00	Jackson, Mississippi, United States	
Win	7–4	Jason Day	KO (punch)	EFC 5: Summer Rumble	July 24, 2010	1	0:08	Lloydminster, Saskatchewan, Canada	
Win	6–4	Claudio Cunha Godoy	TKO (arm injury)	Washington Combat: Battle of the Legends	May 15, 2010	1	5:00	Washington, D.C., United States	
Win	5–4	Chris Hawk	TKO (punches)	Strikeforce: Nashville	April 17, 2010	1	0:47	Nashville, Tennessee, United States	
Win	4–4	Brett Chism	TKO (punches)	GTO Cage Fights	February 20, 2010	1	1:15	Griffin, Georgia, United States	
Loss	3–4	Virgil Zwicker	TKO (punches)	Top Combat Championship 1	September 26, 2009	2	0:46	San Juan, Puerto Rico	
Loss	3–3	Nik Fekete	Decision (unanimous)	VFC: A Night of Vengeance	September 5, 2009	2	5:00	Oranjestad, Aruba	
Win	3–2	Jonathan Smith	Submission (rear-naked choke)	VFC: A Night of Vengeance	September 5, 2009	1	0:46	Oranjestad, Aruba	
Win	2–2	Ombey Mobley	Submission (calf slicer)	XFC 8	April 25, 2009	1	2:36	Knoxville, Tennessee, United States	
Win	1–2	Robert Turner	KO (head kick)	XFC 7	February 20, 2009	1	2:36	Knoxville, Tennessee, United States	
Loss	0–2	Ray Lizama	Decision (unanimous)	Shark Fights 2	December 13, 2008	3	3:00	Amarillo, Texas, United States	
Loss	0–1	Rodney Wallace	Decision (unanimous)	VFC 1	September 27, 2008	3	5:00	Concord, North Carolina, United States	

== Mixed martial arts amateur record ==
Amateur record breakdown		
5 matches	5 wins	0 losses
By knockout	3	0
By submission	1	0
By decision	1	0

Res.	Record	Opponent	Method	Event	Date	Round	Time	Location	Notes
Win	5–0	Todd Smart	KO (punches)	KOTC: Reckless	May 17, 2008	1	1:28	Greenville, Mississippi, United States	
Win	4–0	Mike Cormier	Submission (rear-naked choke)	KOTC: Reckless	May 17, 2008	1	2:59	Greenville, Mississippi, United States	
Win	3–0	Joe Miller	KO (punches)	Warrior FC 77	March 22, 2008	1	1:03	Monticello, Kentucky, United States	
Win	2–0	Chris Stanton	TKO (punches)	VFL 8	March 15, 2008	1	2:07	Cherokee, North Carolina, United States	
Win	1–0	Daniel Crockett	Decision (unanimous)	Stateline MMA: Crossing the Line 5	November 16, 2007	3	3:00	Bristol, Virginia, United States	Won the CTL Amateur Championship.

== Pay-per-view bouts ==
No.	Event	Fight	Date	Venue	City	PPV Buys
1.	UFC 197	Jones vs. Saint Preux	April 23, 2016	MGM Grand Garden Arena	Las Vegas, Nevada, United States	322,000

== See also ==
- List of male mixed martial artists
