= Strikeforce: Evolution =

Strikeforce mixed martial arts event in 2009

- The poster for Strikeforce: Evolution
- Promotion: Strikeforce
- Date: December 19, 2009
- Venue: HP Pavilion at San Jose
- City: San Jose, CA
- Attendance: 14,749
- Total gate: $633,675

Event chronology
Strikeforce Challengers: Woodley vs. Bears	Strikeforce: Evolution	Strikeforce: Miami

Strikeforce: Evolution was a mixed martial arts event to be held by the Strikeforce on December 19, 2009 in San Jose, California at the HP Pavilion at San Jose. The event aired live on Showtime in the US, and live on SuperChannel in Canada.

== Background ==
Robbie Lawler was expected to face Benji Radach on the card, however Radach was not able to get medical clearance to start training in time for the fight. Radach was replaced by Trevor Prangley; however, Prangley suffered a knee injury while training for the bout and had to withdraw from the fight as well. On December 16, it was announced that Lawler would not be competing on the card as a suitable replacement could not be found on such short notice.

Strikeforce newcomer Bryan Travers was expected to fight Daisuke Nakamura but was forced to withdraw due to an undisclosed injury. Justin Wilcox took his place on the fight card.

The Bobby Stack vs. David Douglas bout was cancelled. Douglas, who took the fight on a week's notice, reportedly had difficulty with his weight cut and was hospitalized after having issues holding fluids down.

The event drew an estimated 341,000 viewers on Showtime.

== Results ==
Main Card
Weight class				Method	Round	Time	Notes
Middleweight	Scott Smith	def.	Cung Le	TKO (Punches)	3	3:25	(Note: MMAFighting.com)
Lightweight	Gilbert Melendez (ic)	def.	Josh Thomson (c)	Decision (unanimous)	5	5:00	(Note: Strikeforce Lightweight Championship unification bout.)
Middleweight	Ronaldo Souza	def.	Matt Lindland	Submission (arm-triangle choke)	1	4:18
Heavyweight	Muhammed Lawal	def.	Mike Whitehead	KO (punches)	1	3:08
Preliminary Card
Light Heavyweight	Antwain Britt	def.	Scott Lighty	TKO (doctor stoppage)	1	5:00
Lightweight	Justin Wilcox	def.	Daisuke Nakamura	Decision (unanimous)	3	5:00
Featherweight	Alexander Crispim	def.	A.J. Fonseca	Decision (unanimous)	3	5:00

== Reported payout ==
The following is the payout to the fighters as reported to the California State Athletic Commission. It does not include sponsor money or "locker room" bonuses often given by Strikeforce.

- Scott Smith: ($55,000, no win bonus) def. Cung Le: ($150,000)
- Gilbert Melendez: ($55,000, no win bonus) def. Josh Thomson: ($30,000)
- Ronaldo Souza: ($65,000 includes $10,000 win bonus) def. Matt Lindland: ($50,000)
- Muhammed Lawal: ($20,000 includes $10,000 win bonus) def. Mike Whitehead: ($30,000) ^
- Antwain Britt: ($10,000 includes $5,000 win bonus) def. Scott Lightly: ($5,000)
- Justin Wilcox: ($5,000, no win bonus) def. Daisuke Nakamura: ($200)
- Alexander Crispim: ($4,000 includes $2,000 win bonus) def. AJ Fonseca: ($2,000)

^ Muhammed Lawal was reportedly fined 10 percent of his purse for splashing a sponsors energy drink around the cage. The CSAC's initial report did not include information on the penalty.

== See also ==
- Strikeforce (mixed martial arts)
- List of Strikeforce champions
- List of Strikeforce events
- 2009 in Strikeforce
