= EliteXC: Unfinished Business =

Elite Xtreme Combat MMA event in 2008

- Promotion: EliteXC
- Date: July 26, 2008
- Venue: Stockton Arena
- City: Stockton, California
- Attendance: 6,572 (2,871 paid)
- Total gate: $268,715

Event chronology
| EliteXC: Return of the King | EliteXC: Unfinished Business | EliteXC: Heat |

EliteXC: Unfinished Business was a mixed martial arts event held by EliteXC on July 26, 2008, in Stockton, CA at Stockton Arena.

== Background ==
The show was officially announced during the Showtime broadcast of EliteXC: Return of the King.

The main event featured a rematch between Middleweight Champion Robbie Lawler and Scott Smith, whose match on the EliteXC: Primetime CBS broadcast was stopped due to an unintentional eye poke. This event was the second EliteXC event to air on CBS. In addition, the events preliminary bouts aired on Showtime at 8pm EST, one hour before the 9pm EST start time on CBS.

The event drew an estimated 2,620,000 viewers on CBS.

== Results ==
Main card (CBS)
| Weight class | | | | Method | Round | Time | Notes |
|---|---|---|---|---|---|---|---|
| Middleweight | Robbie Lawler | def. | Scott Smith | TKO (strikes) | 2 | 2:35 | (Note: For the EliteXC Middleweight Championship) |
| Lightweight | Nick Diaz | def. | Thomas Denny | TKO (punches) | 2 | 0:30 |
| Welterweight | Jake Shields | def. | Nick Thompson | Submission (guillotine choke) | 1 | 1:03 | (Note: For the EliteXC Welterweight Championship) |
| Catchweight 140 lbs. | Cris Cyborg | def. | Shayna Baszler | TKO (strikes) | 2 | 2:48 |
Preliminary card (Showtime)
| Heavyweight | Antônio Silva | def. | Justin Eilers | TKO (punches) | 2 | 0:19 | (Note: For the EliteXC Heavyweight Championship) |
| Light Heavyweight | Rafael Cavalcante | vs. | Travis Galbraith | TKO (punches) | 1 | 3:00 |
| Bantamweight | Wilson Reis | def. | Bryan Caraway | Decision (unanimous) (30-27, 30-27, 30-27) | 3 | 5:00 |
Preliminary card (Unaired)
| Lightweight | David Douglas | def. | Marlon Mathias | TKO (punches) | 1 | 0:12 | (Note: Swing bout that occurred after the main event finished.) |
| Light Heavyweight | Anthony Ruiz | def. | Jeromy Freitag | Decision (unanimous) (29–28, 29–28, 29–28) | 3 | 5:00 |
| Heavyweight | Carl Seumanutafa | def. | Mike Cook | KO (slam) | 1 | 1:21 |
| Heavyweight | Drew Montgomery | def. | Brandon Tarn | TKO (cut) | 3 | 4:22 |

== Fighter earnings ==
Total fighter payouts: $533,501.

- Drew Montgomery: $3,000 ($1,500 win bonus) defeated Brandon Tarn: $2,000
- Carl Seumanutafa: $4,000 ($2,000 win bonus) defeated Mike Cook: $2000
- David Douglas: $4,000 ($1,500 win bonus) defeated Marlon Matias: $2,500
- Anthony Ruiz: $5,001 ($3,000 win bonus) defeated Jeremy Freitag: $2,5000
- Wilson Reis: $5,000 ($2,500 win bonus) defeated Bryan Caraway: $2,000
- Rafael Cavalcante: $20,000 ($10,000 win bonus) defeated Travis Galbraith: $5,000
- Antonio Silva: $200,000 ($100,000 win bonus) defeated Justin Eilers: $20,000
- Cris Cyborg: $6,000 ($3,000 win bonus) defeated Shayna Baszler: $8,000
- Jake Shields: $45,000 ($10,000 win bonus) defeated Nick Thompson: $25,000
- Nick Diaz: $60,000 (no win bonus) defeated Thomas Denny: $8,500
- Robbie Lawler: $90,000 (which included a $45,000 win bonus) defeated Scott Smith: $14,000

== See also ==
- Elite Xtreme Combat
- 2008 in Elite Xtreme Combat
