= EliteXC: Return of the King =

Elite Xtreme Combat MMA event in 2008

- Promotion: EliteXC
- Date: June 14, 2008
- Venue: Neal S. Blaisdell Arena
- City: (United States) Honolulu, Hawaii, USA

Event chronology
| EliteXC: Primetime | EliteXC: Return of the King | EliteXC: Unfinished Business |

EliteXC: Return of the King was a mixed martial arts event promoted by EliteXC that took place on Saturday, June 14, 2008 at the Neal S. Blaisdell Arena in Honolulu, Hawaii.

== Background ==
The main card aired live on Showtime and drew an estimated 350,000 viewers.

A Welterweight title bout between champion Jake Shields and Drew Fickett was removed from the original card when Fickett sustained an injury.

Nick Diaz showed up for his 160-pound lightweight fight at 169 pounds which led to it becoming a catchweight bout.

== Results ==
Main card (Showtime)
| Weight class | | | | Method | Round | Time | Notes |
|---|---|---|---|---|---|---|---|
| Lightweight | K. J. Noons (c) | def. | Yves Edwards | TKO (punches and elbows) | 1 | 0:48 | (Note: For the EliteXC Lightweight Championship) |
| Catchweight (169 lbs) | Nick Diaz | def. | Muhsin Corbbrey | TKO (punches) | 3 | 3:59 |
| Middleweight | Murilo Rua | def. | Tony Bonello | KO (punches) | 1 | 3:15 |
| Heavyweight | Dave Herman | def. | Ron Waterman | TKO (punches) | 1 | 2:19 |
| Light Heavyweight | Rafael Cavalcante | def. | Wayne Cole | TKO (punches) | 1 | 2:47 |
Preliminary card (Proelite.com)
| Middleweight | Bubba McDaniel | def. | Kala Hose | Submission (rear-naked choke) | 1 | 0:41 |
| Bantamweight | Mark Oshiro | def. | Chris Willems | Submission (triangle choke) | 1 | 2:12 |
| Lightweight | Mike Aina | def. | Kaleo Kwan | Decision (unanimous) | 3 | 5:00 |
| Lightweight | P.J. Dean | vs. | Dean Lista | Draw | 3 | 5:00 |
| Catchweight (135 lbs) | Russell Doane | def. | Dwayne Haney | TKO (punches and elbows) | 1 | 2:54 |
| Middleweight | Carl Barton | def. | Kepa Madeiros | TKO (punches) | 1 | 0:55 |

== See also ==
- Elite Xtreme Combat
- 2008 in Elite Xtreme Combat
