= Strikeforce: Miami =

Strikeforce mixed martial arts event in 2010

- The poster for Strikeforce: Miami
- Promotion: Strikeforce
- Date: January 30, 2010
- Venue: BankAtlantic Center
- City: Sunrise, Florida, United States
- Attendance: 7,010
- Total gate: $301,424

Event chronology
Strikeforce: Evolution	Strikeforce: Miami	Strikeforce: Nashville

Strikeforce: Miami was a mixed martial arts event held by Strikeforce on January 30, 2010, in Sunrise, Florida, United States at the BankAtlantic Center. The event aired live on Showtime in the US and on Super Channel in Canada.

== Background ==
A bout between Bobby Lashley and Shane Del Rosario had previously been agreed upon, however the fight was scrapped from the card. Bobby Lashley was then expected to face Yohan Banks, however the bout needed commission approval, which was subsequently denied. Jimmy Ambriz was then targeted by the promotion as late replacement for Banks. However, Strikeforce decided not to go with Ambriz, despite being cleared by the Florida State Boxing Commission. Wes Sims stepped in on short notice to fight Lashley.

The bout between Joe Riggs and Jay Hieron was scheduled to air live on EASportsMMA.com but the load on the server brought down the stream.

The event drew an estimated average of 517,000 viewers on Showtime.

== Results ==
Main Card
Weight class				Method	Round	Time	Notes
Welterweight	Nick Diaz	def.	Marius Žaromskis	KO (punch)	1	4:38	(Note: For the inaugural Strikeforce Welterweight Championship.)
Women's Featherweight	Cris Cyborg (c)	def.	Marloes Coenen	TKO (punches)	3	3:40	(Note: For the Strikeforce Women's Featherweight Championship.)
Heavyweight	Herschel Walker	def.	Greg Nagy	TKO (punches)	3	2:17
Middleweight	Robbie Lawler	def.	Melvin Manhoef	KO (punch)	1	3:33
Heavyweight	Bobby Lashley	def.	Wes Sims	TKO (punches)	1	2:06
EASportsMMA.com Live Stream
Welterweight	Jay Hieron	def.	Joe Riggs	Decision (unanimous) (29–28, 30–27, 30–27)	3	5:00
Preliminary card
Welterweight	John Kelly	def.	Sabah Homasi	Submission (rear-naked choke)	2	2:48
Welterweight	Hayder Hassan	def.	Ryan Keenan	KO (punch)	2	2:42
Featherweight	Pablo Alfonso	def.	Marcos da Matta	Submission (armbar)	1	1:47
Lightweight	David Gomez	def.	Craig Oxley	Decision (unanimous) (30–27, 30–27, 30–27)	3	5:00
Welterweight	Joe Ray	def.	John Clarke	TKO (punches)	1	3:14
Middleweight	Jeffrey Cachia	def.	Matt Cooper	KO (punches)	2	2:26
Welterweight	Michael Byrnes	def.	Dave Zitanick	Decision (majority) (29–29, 30–27, 30–27)	3	5:00

== Reported payout ==
The following is a list of fighter salaries as provided by the Florida Department of Business and Professional Regulation. The figures do not include deductions for items such as insurance, licenses and taxes. Additionally, the figures do not include money paid by sponsors, which can often be a substantial portion of a fighter's income.

- Nick Diaz: $100,000 (no win bonus) def. Marius Zaromskis: $30,000
- Cris Cyborg: $35,000 ($15,000 win bonus and $5,000 "championship" bonus) def. Marloes Coenen: $2,000
- Herschel Walker: $600 (no win bonus) def. Greg Nagy: $5,000
- Robbie Lawler: $100,000 (no win bonus) def. Melvin Manhoef: $5,000
- Bobby Lashley: $50,000 (no win bonus) def. Wes Sims: $25,000
- Jay Hieron: $65,000 ($35,000 win bonus) def. Joe Riggs: $30,000
- Michael Byrnes: $2,000 ($1,000 win bonus) def. David Zitnik: $1,500
- Joe Ray: $1,500 ($500 win bonus) def. John Clarke: $1,000
- David Gomez: $2,000 ($1,000 win bonus) def. Craig Oxley: $1,500
- Pablo Alfonso: $3,000 ($1,500 win bonus) def. Marcos DaMatta: $2,500
- Hayder Hassan: $2,000 ($1,000 win bonus) def. Ryan Keenan: $2,000
- Jeffrey Cachia: $2,000 ($1,000 win bonus) def. Matt Cooper: $1,000
- John Kelly: $2,000 ($1,000 win bonus) def. Sabah Homasi: $1,000

== See also ==
- Strikeforce (mixed martial arts)
- List of Strikeforce champions
- List of Strikeforce events
- 2010 in Strikeforce
