= Strikeforce: Lawler vs. Shields =

Strikeforce mixed martial arts event in 2009

- The poster for Strikeforce: Lawler vs. Shields
- Promotion: Strikeforce
- Date: June 6, 2009
- Venue: Scottrade Center
- City: St. Louis, Missouri
- Attendance: 8,867

Event chronology
Strikeforce: Shamrock vs. Diaz	Strikeforce: Lawler vs. Shields	Strikeforce: Carano vs. Cyborg

Strikeforce: Lawler vs. Shields was a mixed martial arts event held by the MMA organization Strikeforce. It was held in St. Louis, Missouri on June 6, 2009. The event drew an estimated 275,000 viewers on Showtime.

== Background ==
Strikeforce Heavyweight Champion Alistair Overeem injured his hand and was unable to fight at this event. He was replaced by Andrei Arlovski.

Renato Sobral was scheduled to face Rafael Cavalcante, but after suffering an injury, was replaced by Mike Kyle.

== Results ==
Main Card
Weight class				Method	Round	Time	Notes
Catchweight (180 lb)	Jake Shields	def.	Robbie Lawler	Submission (guillotine choke)	1	2:02
Heavyweight	Brett Rogers	def.	Andrei Arlovski	TKO (punches)	1	0:22
Catchweight (180 lb)	Nick Diaz	def.	Scott Smith	Submission (rear-naked choke)	3	1:41
Welterweight	Joe Riggs	def.	Phil Baroni	Decision (unanimous) (30–27, 30–27, 30–27)	3	5:00
Light Heavyweight	Mike Kyle	def.	Rafael Cavalcante	KO (punches)	2	4:05
Preliminary Card
Light Heavyweight	Mike Whitehead	def.	Kevin Randleman	Decision (unanimous) (29–28, 29–28, 29–28)	3	5:00
Catchweight (175 lb)	Jesse Finney	def.	Josh Bumgarner	Submission (kimura)	1	1:55
Middleweight	Lucas Lopes	def.	Scott Ventimiglia	Disqualification (illegal knee)	1	3:26
Welterweight	Tyron Woodley	def.	Sal Woods	Submission (Brabo choke)	1	4:20
Light Heavyweight	Booker DeRousse	def.	James Wade	TKO (punches)	1	4:06
Lightweight	Pat Benson	def.	Dave Cochran	Submission (armbar)	1	2:42

== See also ==
- Strikeforce (mixed martial arts)
- List of Strikeforce champions
- List of Strikeforce events
- 2009 in Strikeforce
