= Zach Underwood =

American mixed martial arts fighter

- Born: Union City, Tennessee
- Other names: Thunderwood
- Nationality: American
- Height: 5 ft 9 in (1.75 m)
- Weight: 145 lb (66 kg; 10.4 st)
- Division: Bantamweight; Featherweight; Lightweight
- Years active: 2009 - 2016

Mixed martial arts record
- Total: 20
- Wins: 13
- By knockout: 3
- By decision: 10
- Losses: 7
- By knockout: 3
- By decision: 4

Other information
- Mixed martial arts record from Sherdog

Zach Underwood is an American mixed martial artist. He competed in the bantamweight, featherweight and lightweight divisions.

== Mixed martial arts record ==
Professional record breakdown
20 matches	13 wins	7 losses
By knockout	3	3
By decision	10	4

Res.	Record	Opponent	Method	Event	Date	Round	Time	Location	Notes
Loss	13-7	Jason Williams	TKO (punches)	World Series of Fighting 27: Firmino vs. Fodor	January 23, 2016	1	1:27	Memphis, Tennessee, United States	
Win	13-6	Dawond Pickney	Decision (unanimous)	SFC: Summit Fighting Championships 9	October 18, 2014	3	5:00	Southaven, Mississippi, United States	
Loss	12-6	Austin Lyons	Technical Decision (unanimous)	Bellator 120	May 17, 2014	3	3:25	Southaven, Mississippi, United States	
Win	12-5	Tony Way	Decision (unanimous)	V3 Fights: Johnson vs. Johnson	January 18, 2014	3	5:00	Memphis, Tennessee, United States	
Loss	11-5	Luke Sanders	TKO (punches)	XFC 26: Night of Champions 3	October 18, 2013	2	3:38	Nashville, Tennessee, United States	
Win	11-4	Deivison Francisco Ribeiro	Decision (unanimous)	XFC 23: Louisville Slugfest	April 19, 2013	3	5:00	Louisville, Kentucky, United States	
Win	10-4	Chris Coggins	Decision (unanimous)	Bellator LXXIII	August 24, 2012	3	5:00	Tunica, Mississippi, United States	
Win	9-4	Jimmy Van Horn	TKO (punches)	Prize Fight Promotions: Mid South MMA Championships 6	May 19, 2012	1	4:33	Southaven, Mississippi, United States	
Loss	8-4	Mike Santiago	Decision (unanimous)	NAFC: Mayhem	May 6, 2011	3	5:00	Milwaukee, Wisconsin, United States	
Win	8-3	Matt Traylor	Decision (split)	Sportfight X: Middle Tennessee Mayhem	January 29, 2011	3	5:00	Murfreesboro, Tennessee, United States	
Loss	7-3	Austin Lyons	Decision (split)	Empire FC: A Night of Reckoning 4	October 9, 2010	5	5:00	Tunica, Mississippi, United States	
Win	7-2	Hunter Worsham	Decision (unanimous)	Strikeforce: Nashville	April 17, 2010	3	5:00	Nashville, Tennessee, United States	
Win	6-2	Terry Robinson	Decision (unanimous)	Empire FC: A Night of Reckoning 2	February 27, 2010	3	5:00	Tunica, Mississippi, United States	
Loss	5-2	Josh Shaffer	KO (punch)	H.B. Dick: Promotions	December 19, 2009	1	2:14	Murray, Kentucky, United States	
Win	5-1	Tommy Roberts	Decision (unanimous)	Relentless MMA: Union City Fight Night 5	December 5, 2009	3	5:00	Union City, Tennessee, United States	
Win	4-1	Nathan Waites	TKO (punches)	HTF: Harrah's Tunica Fights	October 23, 2009	1	1:08	Robinsonville, Mississippi, United States	
Win	3-1	Jason Powers	TKO (punches)	LAE: Lethal Assault Cagefighting	September 12, 2009	1	0:35	Kennett, Missouri, United States	
Win	2-1	Dan Bulkley	Decision (unanimous)	CA: Battlegrounds	August 22, 2009	3	5:00	Millington, Tennessee, United States	
Loss	1-1	Chris Coggins	Decision (unanimous)	H.B. Dick: Promotions	May 23, 2009	3	5:00	Paducah, Kentucky, United States	
Win	1-0	Omar Sutton	Decision (majority)	Cage Assault: Bragging Rights	April 24, 2009	3	5:00	Memphis, Tennessee, United States	

== See also ==
- List of male mixed martial artists
