= Rafael Cavalcante =

Brazilian mixed martial arts fighter

- Born: 5 April 1980 (age 46); Ilha Solteira, São Paulo, Brazil
- Other names: Feijão
- Height: 6 ft 0 in (183 cm)
- Weight: 205 lb (93 kg; 14 st 9 lb)
- Division: Heavyweight (265 lb); Light heavyweight (205 lb)
- Reach: 74 in (188 cm)
- Fighting out of: Rio de Janeiro, Brazil
- Team: X-Gym; Team Nogueira
- Rank: Black belt in Brazilian Jiu-Jitsu, Black belt in Muay Thai
- Years active: 2006–2017

Mixed martial arts record
- Total: 21
- Wins: 13
- By knockout: 13
- Losses: 7
- By knockout: 4
- By decision: 2
- By disqualification: 1
- No contests: 1

Other information
- Mixed martial arts record from Sherdog

Rafael Cavalcante (born 5 April 1980), often known by his nickname of Feijão, is a Brazilian mixed martial artist who fights in the light heavyweight division. He is currently competing for Bellator MMA. He trains with Anderson Silva and Antônio Rodrigo Nogueira as part of the Black House camp. He formerly competed in Strikeforce, where he was at one time Strikeforce Light Heavyweight Champion. His nickname (pronounced [fejˈʒɐ̃w]) means "bean" in Portuguese. He holds notable wins over Muhammed "King Mo" Lawal and Yoel Romero.

== Background ==
Cavalcante is from São Paulo, Brazil and began training in Brazilian Jiu-Jitsu at the age of 10. Cavalcante also studied veterinary medicine for five years at the Universidade de Cuiaba - UNIC in his adopted hometown of Cuiaba, Mato Grosso, and it was the legendary Antônio Rodrigo Nogueira who personally convinced Cavalcante's father to allow his son to give up his medical career, in order to focus solely on training for a career in professional fighting under the tutelage of Nogueira. Cavalcante began training at Nogueira's gym daily, alongside the likes of Anderson Silva, André Galvão, and Nogueira's twin brother, Antônio Rogério Nogueira.

== Mixed martial arts career ==
=== Early career ===
Cavalcante made his professional mixed martial arts debut in 2006, in the Pantanal Combat tournament, in the State of Mato Grosso, Brazil, compiling an undefeated record of 3-0 before being signed by the IFL.

=== IFL ===
Cavalcante made his promotional debut at IFL: Atlanta, facing veteran Devin Cole whom he defeated via TKO early in the second round. Cavalcante made his next appearance at IFL: Las Vegas, facing fellow Brazilian Márcio Cruz. Cavalcante lost the fight via disqualification in the third round due to illegal upkicks. This was Cavalcante's first professional defeat.

=== EliteXC ===
In 2008, Cavalcante began competing for EliteXC, making his debut for the promotion and light heavyweight debut at EliteXC: Street Certified on 16 February 2008, facing John Doyle. Cavalcante won via TKO in the first round.

Cavalcante made his next appearance at EliteXC: Return of the King on 14 June 2008 against veteran Wayne Cole. Cavalcante won via TKO, after knocking down Cole with a series of punches and knees. On 26 July 2008, Cavalcante faced Travis Galbraith, who was given a weeks' notice for the fight, at EliteXC: Unfinished Business. Cavalcante won via knockout in the first round.

Cavalcante was next scheduled to fight for the inaugural EliteXC Light Heavyweight Championship against Cyrille Diabaté in November 2008, but Diabaté pulled out due to an injury, and the event itself was eventually folded as EliteXC closed operations a month before the fight's scheduled date. Cavalcante's contract was later purchased by Strikeforce.

=== Strikeforce ===
On 6 June 2009, Cavalcante was originally scheduled to face Renato Sobral at Strikeforce: Lawler vs. Shields, but Sobral pulled out for personal reasons, and was replaced by Jared Hamman, who also pulled out, due to an injury. Cavalcante instead faced UFC veteran Mike Kyle. Cavalcante was handed his first decisive defeat, losing to Kyle via knockout.

On 15 May 2010 Cavalcante knocked out Antwain Britt at Strikeforce: Heavy Artillery to become the number one contender for the Strikeforce Light Heavyweight Championship.

Cavalcante fought against the heavily-touted Muhammed Lawal in Houston, Texas for the Strikeforce Light Heavyweight Championship, and defeated Lawal by TKO due to elbows from the clinch at 1:14 of round 3 to become the new Strikeforce Light Heavyweight Champion.

Cavalcante lost his title to Dan Henderson via third-round TKO, on 5 March 2011.

Cavalcante faced Yoel Romero on 10 September 2011 at Strikeforce: Barnett vs. Kharitonov. He won the fight via KO in the second round.

Feijao fought a rematch against Mike Kyle on 19 May 2012. He avenged his previous defeat by rocking Kyle with a knee and then choked him out with a guillotine choke after 33 seconds in the first round. After the fight he tested positive for the banned substance stanozolol. As a result, the fight was overturned to a "no contest" by the CSAC and he was fined $2,500 and suspended for a year.

=== Ultimate Fighting Championship ===
Cavalcante made his anticipated UFC debut against Thiago Silva on 8 June 2013 at UFC on Fuel TV 10. Despite success early in the first round, Cavalcante lost via knock out at the end of the round. Though he lost, he still earned the Fight of the Night bonus along with Silva.

Cavalcante faced Igor Pokrajac on 9 November 2013 at UFC Fight Night 32. He won the fight via submission due to strikes in the first round.

Cavalcante faced Ryan Bader on 14 June 2014 at UFC 174. He lost the fight via unanimous decision.

Cavalcante faced Patrick Cummins on 1 August 2015 at UFC 190. He lost the back-and-forth fight by TKO due to elbows in the third round.

Cavalcante faced Ovince Saint Preux on 6 February 2016 at UFC Fight Night 82. He lost the fight by unanimous decision (30-27, 30-27, 29-28). After his loss to Ovince Saint Preux, he was subsequently released from the promotion.

=== Bellator MMA ===
On 1 July 2017, Cavalcante defeated Dan Konecke via technical knockout in the first round to earn a Bellator MMA contract.

== Personal life ==
In June 2016, Cavalcante was involved in a bar fight at a country music bar in Cuiaba, Mato Grosso. In a police report, Cavalcante claims a man forcefully grabbed his girlfriend and along with a friend threatened to kill him. The other man stated Cavalcante verbally abused him and punched him in the face.

== Championships and accomplishments ==
- Strikeforce
  - Strikeforce Light Heavyweight Championship (One time)
- Ultimate Fighting Championship
  - Fight of the Night (One time)
- Sherdog
  - 2010 All-Violence Second Team

== Mixed martial arts record ==
Professional record breakdown
21 matches	13 wins	7 losses
By knockout	13	4
By decision	0	2
By disqualification	0	1
No contests	1	

Res.	Record	Opponent	Method	Event	Date	Round	Time	Location	Notes
Win	13–7 (1)	Dan Konecke	TKO (punches)	World Fight Tour 7: Road To Bellator	1 July 2017	1	4:10	Las Palmas, Gran Canaria, Spain	
Loss	12–7 (1)	Ovince Saint Preux	Decision (unanimous)	UFC Fight Night: Hendricks vs. Thompson	6 February 2016	3	5:00	Las Vegas, Nevada, United States	
Loss	12–6 (1)	Patrick Cummins	TKO (elbows)	UFC 190	1 August 2015	3	0:45	Rio de Janeiro, Brazil	
Loss	12–5 (1)	Ryan Bader	Decision (unanimous)	UFC 174	14 June 2014	3	5:00	Vancouver, British Columbia, Canada	
Win	12–4 (1)	Igor Pokrajac	TKO (knees and punches)	UFC Fight Night: Belfort vs. Henderson	9 November 2013	1	1:18	Goiânia, Brazil	
Loss	11–4 (1)	Thiago Silva	KO (punches)	UFC on Fuel TV: Nogueira vs. Werdum	8 June 2013	1	4:29	Fortaleza, Brazil	Fight of the Night.
NC	11–3 (1)	Mike Kyle	NC (overturned)	Strikeforce: Barnett vs. Cormier	19 May 2012	1	0:33	San Jose, California, United States	Originally a submission (guillotine choke) win for Cavalcante; overturned after he tested positive for stanozolol.
Win	11–3	Yoel Romero	KO (punches)	Strikeforce: Barnett vs. Kharitonov	10 September 2011	2	4:51	Cincinnati, Ohio, United States	
Loss	10–3	Dan Henderson	TKO (punches)	Strikeforce: Feijao vs. Henderson	5 March 2011	3	0:50	Columbus, Ohio, United States	Lost the Strikeforce Light Heavyweight Championship.
Win	10–2	Muhammed Lawal	TKO (punches and elbows)	Strikeforce: Houston	21 August 2010	3	1:14	Houston, Texas, United States	Won the Strikeforce Light Heavyweight Championship.
Win	9–2	Antwain Britt	KO (punches)	Strikeforce: Heavy Artillery	15 May 2010	1	3:45	St. Louis, Missouri, United States	Strikeforce Light Heavyweight title eliminator.
Win	8–2	Aaron Rosa	TKO (punches)	Strikeforce Challengers: Woodley vs. Bears	20 November 2009	2	3:35	Kansas City, Kansas, United States	
Loss	7–2	Mike Kyle	TKO (punches)	Strikeforce: Lawler vs. Shields	6 June 2009	2	4:05	St. Louis, Missouri, United States	
Win	7–1	Travis Galbraith	KO (knees)	EliteXC: Unfinished Business	26 July 2008	1	3:01	Stockton, California, United States	
Win	6–1	Wayne Cole	TKO (punches)	EliteXC: Return of the King	14 June 2008	1	2:47	Honolulu, Hawaii, United States	
Win	5–1	John Doyle	TKO (knee to the body)	EliteXC: Street Certified	16 February 2008	1	2:17	Miami, Florida, United States	Light Heavyweight debut.
Loss	4–1	Márcio Cruz	DQ (illegal upkick)	IFL: Las Vegas	16 June 2007	3	3:42	Las Vegas, Nevada, United States	
Win	4–0	Devin Cole	TKO (punches)	IFL: Atlanta	23 February 2007	2	0:26	Atlanta, Georgia, United States	
Win	3–0	Rubens Xavier	TKO (Submission to punches)	MF 5	9 December 2006	1	2:30	São Paulo, Brazil	
Win	2–0	Miodrag Petkovic	TKO (knee and punches)	WFC: Europe vs Brazil	20 May 2006	2	1:37	Koper, Slovenia	
Win	1–0	Eduardo Maiorino	KO (punches)	Pantanal Combat	10 February 2006	1	4:13	Cuiabá, Brazil	

== See also ==
- List of current Bellator fighters
- List of male mixed martial artists

Awards and achievements
Preceded by Muhammed Lawal	5th Strikeforce Light Heavyweight Champion; 21 August 2010 – 5 March 2011	Succeeded by Dan Henderson
