= Muhammed Lawal =

American mixed martial artist (born 1981)

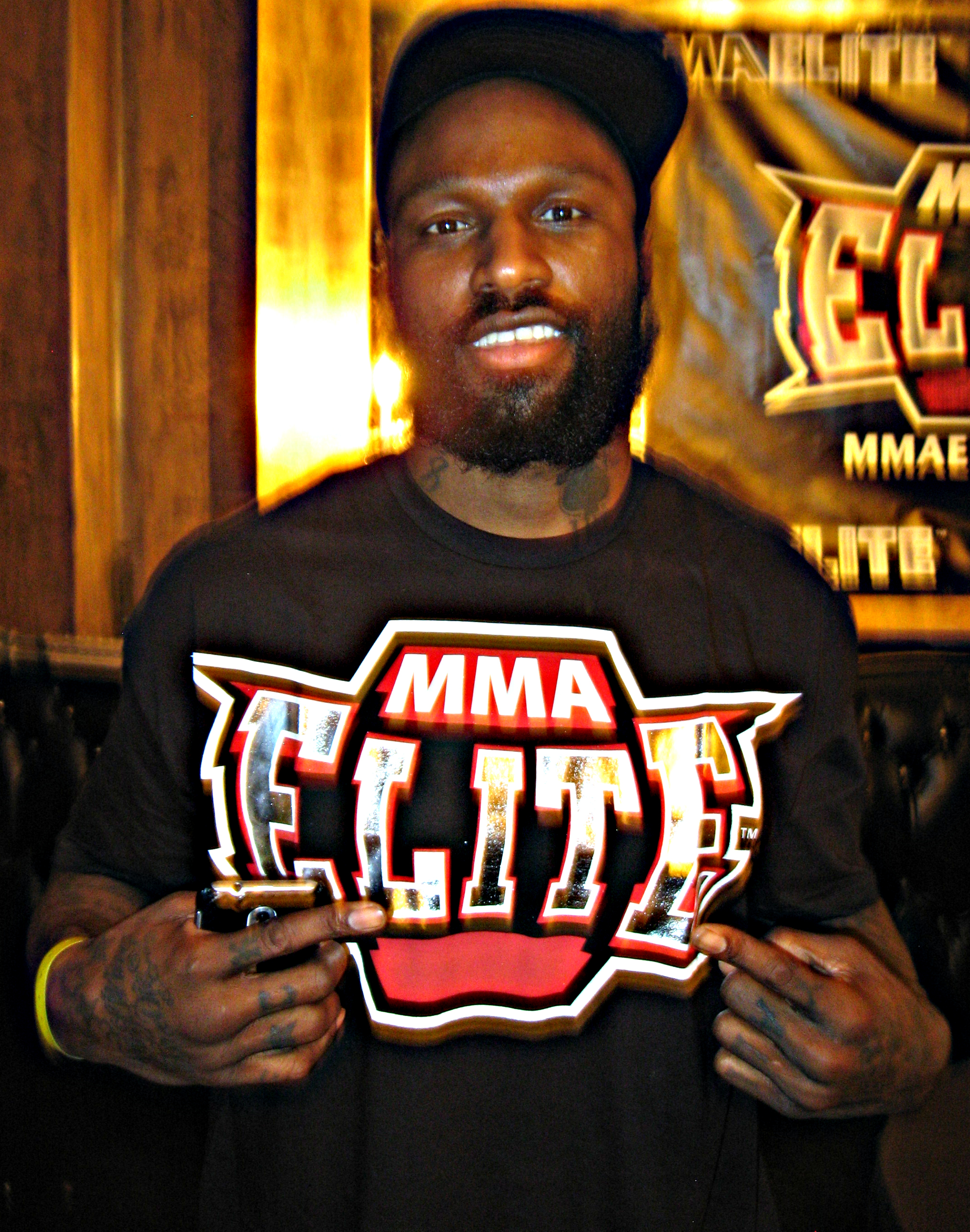
- Lawal in 2012
- Born: January 11, 1981 (age 45); Murfreesboro, Tennessee, U.S.
- Other names: King Mo
- Height: 6 ft 0 in (183 cm)
- Weight: 205 lb (93 kg; 14 st 9 lb)
- Division: Light heavyweight (2009–2016); Heavyweight (2008–2009; 2015–2019)
- Reach: 79 in (201 cm)
- Fighting out of: Coconut Creek, Florida, U.S.
- Team: American Top Team; Mayweather Boxing
- Rank: NCAA Division I Wrestling
- Years active: 2008–2019

Mixed martial arts record
- Total: 32
- Wins: 21
- By knockout: 13
- By decision: 8
- Losses: 10
- By knockout: 7
- By decision: 3
- No contests: 1

Other information
- University: Oklahoma State University; University of Central Oklahoma
- Notable school: Plano East Senior High School
- Mixed martial arts record from Sherdog
Medal record
Men's freestyle wrestling
Representing United States
World Cup
Silver medal – second place	2007 Krasnoyarsk	96 kg
Pan American Championships
Gold medal – first place	2007 San Salvador	96 kg
US National Championships
Gold medal – first place	2005 Las Vegas	84 kg
Gold medal – first place	2006 Las Vegas	84 kg
Gold medal – first place	2008 Las Vegas	84 kg
Silver medal – second place	2007 Las Vegas	96 kg
Bronze medal – third place	2004 Las Vegas	84 kg
Collegiate Wrestling
Representing the Oklahoma State Cowboys
NCAA Division I Championships
Bronze medal – third place	2003 Kansas City	197 lb
Big 12 Championships
Gold medal – first place	2003 Columbia	197 lb
NCAA Division II Championships
Representing the Central Oklahoma Bronchos
Gold medal – first place	2002 Edmond	197 lb
Silver medal – second place	2001 Fargo	184 lb

Muhammed Lawal (born January 11, 1981), known by his ring name King Mo, is an American professional wrestler and retired mixed martial artist currently signed to Bare Knuckle Fighting Championship. As a mixed martial artist, he is a former Strikeforce Light Heavyweight Champion and Rizin 100kg World Grand Prix Champion.

== Early life ==
Lawal was raised along with his siblings by a single mother. Growing up Lawal was a fan of professional wrestling and began competing in wrestling at Plano East Senior High School in Plano, Texas. As a junior Lawal won a state title in the Greco-Roman category and also finished as a state runner-up. During his senior season Lawal went undefeated and became a Texas state champion after defeating 171 pound favorite Barrett Lidji. Lawal also competed in football, earning All-District honors as a linebacker during his junior season and as a wide receiver in his senior season. Lawal also lettered in track and field.

== College and freestyle wrestling ==
Lawal went on to compete in NCAA Division II wrestling at the University of Central Oklahoma. He finished 2nd place in the nation in 2001 and was a national champion in 2002. For his senior year Lawal moved on to Division I at Oklahoma State University. Lawal became a Big 12 Conference Champion and Division I All-American in 2003 for Oklahoma State, where he finished in third place for the 197 pound division. Lawal was also the university freestyle national champion at 185 pounds that year. After college Lawal continued his wrestling career at the senior level. He also competed in the newly formed Real Pro Wrestling league and became the champion of the 184 pound weight class in 2004.

He won the Senior U.S. national championship in freestyle wrestling three times - in 2005, 2006 and 2008. He also represented the U.S. at the 2005 World Wrestling Championships, where he finished in 7th place. He controversially lost his match to Sazhid Sazhidov of Russia when he was penalized a point for passivity with 1 second remaining in a match he was winning, giving Sazhidov the win. Revaz Mindorashvili would be the gold medalist at these games, a wrestler Lawal has defeated.

For over three years, Lawal was the number one ranked wrestler in the United States in the 84 kilogram division. After narrowly missing entrance to the 2008 Olympics in a loss to Andy Hrovat, for which he was favored a spot, Lawal decided to enter the world of mixed martial arts.

== Mixed martial arts career ==
=== World Victory Road ===
In his 2008 mixed martial arts debut at Sengoku 5, Lawal fought Travis Wiuff, a veteran of 66 fights at the time, knocking him out in the first round.

At Sengoku 6, Lawal fought Fábio Silva on November 1, 2008, defeating him in the third round via strikes.

On January 4, 2009, Lawal faced Yukiya Naito at World Victory Road Presents: Sengoku no Ran 2009, defeating him in the first round with punches.

On March 20, 2009, at Sengoku 7, Lawal defeated Ryo Kawamura by unanimous decision. His first time going the distance, Lawal attributed his performance to a knee injury sustained about a week before the fight, "I kinda tweaked it rolling around [with Dean Lister], and I tried to rehab it as much as I could before the fight."

=== M-1 Global ===
On August 28, 2009, Lawal fought for the first time on U.S. soil against Mark Kerr at M-1 Global Presents Breakthrough. Lawal defeated Kerr by technical knockout 25 seconds into the fight.

=== Strikeforce ===
On October 13, 2009, it was announced that Lawal had signed a multi-fight contract with U.S. based promotion Strikeforce. The contract allowed him to continue fighting in the Japanese circuit where he has gained his notoriety.

On December 19 at Strikeforce: Evolution Lawal fought Mike Whitehead, defeating him three minutes and eight seconds into round one via KO (punches). Lawal came in showing relaxed hands and strong counter punching and caught Whitehead with a strong right which dropped him. Lawal followed up with three punches causing the referee to stop the fight.

On April 17, 2010, Lawal defeated Gegard Mousasi by unanimous decision to win the Strikeforce Light Heavyweight Championship.

Lawal lost the Strikeforce Light Heavyweight Championship in Houston Texas, on August 21, against Rafael Cavalcante by TKO due to punches and elbows of 1:14 of round 3.

Lawal was out of action until mid-2011 after undergoing surgery to repair a knee injury.

Lawal was scheduled to fight Roger Gracie at Strikeforce: Fedor vs. Henderson on July 30, 2011. Gracie, however, withdrew from the bout in late June due to an injury. The fight was rescheduled for Strikeforce World Grand Prix: Barnett vs. Kharitonov on Sept. 10, 2011, and Lawal won via KO in the first round.

Lawal garnered his second straight victory, defeating previously unbeaten Lorenz Larkin at Strikeforce: Rockhold vs. Jardine via second-round KO. However, Lawal tested positive for anabolic steroids (Drostanolone) and as a result of the banned substance, the fight's result has been changed to a no contest while Lawal will have his license suspended for one year. After meeting with the Nevada State Athletic Commission on March 27, 2012, his suspension was reduced to nine months.

Lawal was released from Strikeforce following comments he made on Twitter regarding Pat Lundvall after his hearing for his drug test. Lawal said, "She asked if I did research for my training. I didn't get what she meant by the question, and she rolled her eyes and asked, 'Do you speak English? Can you read?' I felt I was disrespected by the woman's comments. How are you going to ask a college educated, well traveled man if he can speak or read English? I'm speaking English right in front of you and I've been speaking English right in front of you for the past 15 minutes." After the release, Lawal issued an apology to Lundvall, stating, "I was out of line for calling the woman the b-word and I was wrong for that. I was kind of mad about the comments, I was offended by the comments made towards me and I was out of line. I was too emotional. I apologize for that. With that being said, I still feel that I was offended, but I'm in the wrong for what I said."

=== Bellator MMA ===
On May 10, 2012, it was reported that Lawal had signed a contract with the mixed martial arts promotion Bellator Fighting Championships.

On January 24, 2013, Lawal made his Bellator debut as a participant in the Season 8 light heavyweight tournament. He defeated Przemyslaw Mysiala in the quarterfinal round via right hook. Lawal faced Emanuel Newton in the semifinals on February 21, 2013, at Bellator 90. Despite being a considerable favorite, Lawal lost via KO due to a spinning back fist in the first round.

Lawal faced Seth Petruzelli in the opening round of a 4-man tournament at Bellator 96 on June 19, 2013, he won the fight by KO due to a punch in full guard at 1:35 of the first round.

Lawal next faced Jacob Noe at Bellator 97 in the light heavyweight tournament final. He won via TKO due to punches in round three to win the Bellator 2013 Summer Series light heavyweight tournament.

Lawal faced Emanuel Newton in a rematch for the Interim Bellator Light Heavyweight Championship on November 2, 2013, at Bellator 106. Lawal lost via unanimous decision.

Lawal entered into the Bellator season ten light heavyweight tournament on February 28, 2014. He faced Mikhail Zayats in the semifinals at Bellator 110 and won the fight via unanimous decision. He faced Quinton Jackson in the tournament final for a title shot. He lost the fight via controversial unanimous decision.

Muhammed Lawal was scheduled to fight Tom DeBlass on September 5, 2014, at Bellator 123; however, Tom DeBlass suffered a knee injury and was forced off the card. Lawal was expected to fight replacement Marcus Sursa at Bellator 123; however instead faced Dustin Jacoby. Lawal won the fight via TKO in the second round.

Lawal was again expected to face Tom DeBlass on November 15, 2014, at Bellator 131. However, on November 1, it was announced that Deblass had suffered a cut during training and had to withdraw from the bout. Lawal eventually faced Joe Vedepo. He won via TKO due to punches in the third round.

Lawal faced Cheick Kongo in a heavyweight bout on February 27, 2015, at Bellator 134. He won the fight by split decision.

Lawal was next a participant in Bellator's one-night light heavyweight tournament at Bellator MMA & Glory: Dynamite 1 on September 19, 2015. He faced Linton Vassell in the opening round and won by unanimous decision. However, Lawal was unable to advance to the finals due to a rib injury.

Lawal faced Phil Davis at Bellator 154 on May 14, 2016. The bout was to determine the next challenger for champion Liam McGeary. He lost the fight by unanimous decision.

Lawal faced Satoshi Ishii at Bellator 169 on December 16, 2016. He won the fight via unanimous decision.

Lawal faced Quinton Jackson in a rematch at Bellator 175 on March 31, 2017. He won the fight via unanimous decision, thus avenging his previous loss to Jackson. Post-fight, it was announced Lawal would face Ryan Bader at Bellator 180. However, Lawal pulled out of the bout in April and was replaced by Phil Davis.

Lawal was expected to face Liam McGeary at Bellator 185 on October 20, 2017. However, he pulled out of the bout on October 2 due to an undisclosed injury.

Lawal faced Ryan Bader in the Bellator Heavyweight Grand Prix for the Bellator Heavyweight championship at Bellator 199 on May 12, 2018. He lost the fight via TKO just 15 seconds into the first round.

Lawal faced former Bellator Light Heavyweight World Champion Liam McGeary at Bellator 213 on December 15, 2018. He lost the fight via TKO in the third round.

=== RIZIN Fighting Federation Tournament ===
On November 6, 2015, RIZIN Fighting Federation announced that Lawal would represent Bellator in 8-man tourney at New Year's Eve Rizin card in Japan. His first opponent was initially supposed to be BAMMA heavyweight champ Mark Godbeer, but he eventually faced Brett McDermott. Lawal won the fight via knockout in the first round. He faced Teodoras Aukstuolis in the semi-final round on December 31, 2015, and won via unanimous decision after two rounds. In the tournament finals, Lawal faced Jiří Procházka and won the fight via knockout in the first round.

On December 29, 2016, Lawal returned to Rizin FF as a participant in the Openweight Grand-Prix, replacing an injured Wanderlei Silva in a bout against Mirko Cro Cop. Lawal lost to Cro Cop via TKO in the second round.

== Mixed martial arts record ==
Professional record breakdown
32 matches	21 wins	10 losses
By knockout	13	7
By decision	8	3
No contests	1	

Res.	Record	Opponent	Method	Event	Date	Round	Time	Location	Notes
Loss	21–10 (1)	Andrew Kapel	KO (punches)	Bellator 233	November 8, 2019	1	1:22	Thackerville, Oklahoma, United States	Catchweight (195 lbs) bout. Announced retirement after fight.
Loss	21–9 (1)	Jiří Procházka	TKO (punches)	Rizin 15	April 21, 2019	3	3:02	Yokohama, Japan	For the inaugural Rizin Light Heavyweight Championship.
Loss	21–8 (1)	Liam McGeary	TKO (punches)	Bellator 213	December 15, 2018	3	0:53	Honolulu, Hawaii, United States	Return to Light Heavyweight.
Loss	21–7 (1)	Ryan Bader	TKO (punches)	Bellator 199	May 12, 2018	1	0:15	San Jose, California, United States	Bellator Heavyweight World Grand Prix Quarterfinal.
Win	21–6 (1)	Quinton Jackson	Decision (unanimous)	Bellator 175	March 31, 2017	3	5:00	Rosemont, Illinois, United States	
Loss	20–6 (1)	Mirko Cro Cop	TKO (punches)	Rizin World Grand Prix 2016: 2nd Round	December 29, 2016	2	1:41	Saitama, Japan	2016 Rizin Openweight Grand Prix Quarterfinal.
Win	20–5 (1)	Satoshi Ishii	Decision (unanimous)	Bellator 169	December 16, 2016	3	5:00	Dublin, Ireland	
Loss	19–5 (1)	Phil Davis	Decision (unanimous)	Bellator 154	May 14, 2016	3	5:00	San Jose, California, United States	Light Heavyweight bout.
Win	19–4 (1)	Jiří Procházka	KO (punch)	Rizin World Grand Prix 2015: Part 2 - Iza	December 31, 2015	1	5:09	Saitama, Japan	Won the 2015 Rizin World Grand Prix.
Win	18–4 (1)	Teodoras Aukstuolis	Decision (unanimous)	Rizin World Grand Prix 2015: Part 2 - Iza	December 31, 2015	2	5:00	Saitama, Japan	2015 Rizin World Grand Prix Semifinal.
Win	17–4 (1)	Brett McDermott	KO (punches)	Rizin World Grand Prix 2015: Part 1 - Saraba	December 29, 2015	1	9:20	Saitama, Japan	Return to Heavyweight. 2015 Rizin World Grand Prix Quarterfinal.
Win	16–4 (1)	Linton Vassell	Decision (unanimous)	Bellator 142: Dynamite 1	September 19, 2015	2	5:00	San Jose, California, United States	Bellator Light Heavyweight tournament semifinal.
Win	15–4 (1)	Cheick Kongo	Decision (split)	Bellator 134	February 27, 2015	3	5:00	Uncasville, Connecticut, United States	Heavyweight bout.
Win	14–4 (1)	Joe Vedepo	TKO (punches)	Bellator 131	November 15, 2014	3	0:39	San Diego, California, United States	
Win	13–4 (1)	Dustin Jacoby	TKO (punches)	Bellator 123	September 5, 2014	2	1:13	Uncasville, Connecticut, United States	
Loss	12–4 (1)	Quinton Jackson	Decision (unanimous)	Bellator 120	May 17, 2014	3	5:00	Southaven, Mississippi, United States	Bellator Season 10 Light Heavyweight tournament final.
Win	12–3 (1)	Mikhail Zayats	Decision (unanimous)	Bellator 110	February 28, 2014	3	5:00	Uncasville, Connecticut, United States	Bellator Season 10 Light Heavyweight tournament semifinal.
Loss	11–3 (1)	Emanuel Newton	Decision (unanimous)	Bellator 106	November 2, 2013	5	5:00	Long Beach, California, United States	For the Interim Bellator Light Heavyweight Championship.
Win	11–2 (1)	Jacob Noe	TKO (retirement)	Bellator 97	July 31, 2013	3	2:51	Rio Rancho, New Mexico, United States	Bellator 2013 Summer Series Light Heavyweight tournament final.
Win	10–2 (1)	Seth Petruzelli	KO (punch)	Bellator 96	June 19, 2013	1	1:35	Thackerville, Oklahoma, United States	Bellator 2013 Summer Series Light Heavyweight tournament semifinal.
Loss	9–2 (1)	Emanuel Newton	KO (spinning back fist)	Bellator 90	February 21, 2013	1	2:35	West Valley City, Utah, United States	Bellator Season 8 Light Heavyweight tournament semifinal.
Win	9–1 (1)	Przemyslaw Mysiala	TKO (punches)	Bellator 86	January 24, 2013	1	3:52	Thackerville, Oklahoma, United States	Bellator Season 8 Light Heavyweight tournament quarterfinal.
NC	8–1 (1)	Lorenz Larkin	NC (overturned)	Strikeforce: Rockhold vs. Jardine	January 7, 2012	2	1:32	Las Vegas, Nevada, United States	Originally a KO (punches) win for Lawal; result overturned after Lawal tested positive for Drostanolone.
Win	8–1	Roger Gracie	KO (punches)	Strikeforce: Barnett vs. Kharitonov	September 10, 2011	1	4:37	Cincinnati, Ohio, United States	
Loss	7–1	Rafael Cavalcante	TKO (punches and elbows)	Strikeforce: Houston	August 21, 2010	3	1:14	Houston, Texas, United States	Lost the Strikeforce Light Heavyweight Championship.
Win	7–0	Gegard Mousasi	Decision (unanimous)	Strikeforce: Nashville	April 17, 2010	5	5:00	Nashville, Tennessee, United States	Return to Light Heavyweight; Won the Strikeforce Light Heavyweight Championship.
Win	6–0	Mike Whitehead	KO (punches)	Strikeforce: Evolution	December 19, 2009	1	3:08	San Jose, California, United States	
Win	5–0	Mark Kerr	TKO (punches)	M-1 Global: Breakthrough	August 28, 2009	1	0:25	Kansas City, Kansas, United States	Return to Heavyweight.
Win	4–0	Ryo Kawamura	Decision (unanimous)	World Victory Road Presents: Sengoku 7	March 20, 2009	3	5:00	Tokyo, Japan	
Win	3–0	Yukiya Naito	TKO (punches)	World Victory Road Presents: Sengoku no Ran 2009	January 4, 2009	1	3:54	Saitama, Japan	Light Heavyweight debut.
Win	2–0	Fábio Silva	TKO (punches)	World Victory Road Presents: Sengoku 6	November 1, 2008	3	0:41	Saitama, Japan	
Win	1–0	Travis Wiuff	TKO (punches)	World Victory Road Presents: Sengoku 5	September 28, 2008	1	2:11	Tokyo, Japan	

== World Championship matches ==
Res.	Record	Opponent	Score	Date	Event	Location	Notes
Loss	2-1	Sazhid Sazhidov	1–0, 0–1, 1–1	2005-09-26	2005 World Wrestling Championships	Budapest, Hungary	Sazhidov wins on criteria.
Win	2-0	Ruslan Sumenkov	6–0, 1–0	2005-09-26	2005 World Wrestling Championships	Budapest, Hungary	
Win	1-0	Ibrahim Al Khatib	Fall	2005-09-26	2005 World Wrestling Championships	Budapest, Hungary	

== Submission grappling record ==
? Matches, ? Wins (? Submissions), ? Losses (? Submissions), 0 Draws
Result	Rec.	Opponent	Method	Event	Division	Date	Location
Loss	0–1–1	(United States) James Krause	Guillotine choke	Quintet Ultra		December 12, 2019	
Draw	1–1–0	(United States) Anthony Johnson	Points	Quintet Ultra		December 12, 2019	

== Professional wrestling career ==
Muhammed Lawal
Personal information
- Born: Muhammed Lawal; January 11, 1981 (age 45) Murfreesboro, Tennessee

Professional wrestling career
- Ring name: King Mo
- Billed height: 6 ft 0 in (1.83 m)
- Billed weight: 205 lb (93 kg)
- Billed from: San Jose, California
- Trained by: Ohio Valley Wrestling
- Debut: September 2012
- Retired: 2021

=== Early career ===
Lawal was a professional wrestling fan from an early age. Upon graduating from college, Lawal was offered a contract by the professional wrestling promotion World Wrestling Entertainment. Lawal spent a week at Ohio Valley Wrestling, WWE's developmental territory, before ultimately rejecting the contract offer, instead opting to pursue a career in mixed martial arts.

=== Total Nonstop Action Wrestling (2012–2015) ===
In May 2012, upon signing with Bellator Fighting Championships, Lawal also signed a separate contract with the professional wrestling promotion Total Nonstop Action Wrestling (TNA), with the intention of simultaneously pursuing careers in mixed martial arts and professional wrestling. Lawal stated that he expected to appear with TNA "two or three times a month or whenever they can book me" and that "if I have a fight coming up, I won't be doing shows or taping". In September 2012, it was reported that Lawal would train as a professional wrestler at Ohio Valley Wrestling, now TNA's developmental territory in Louisville, Kentucky. Lawal made his first appearance in TNA on the October 4, 2012 episode of Impact Wrestling. He went on to serve as a special guest enforcer for a street fight between Bobby Roode and James Storm at the Bound for Glory pay-per-view on October 14, 2012.

King Mo returned to TNA on the July 24, 2014 episode of Impact Wrestling as a heel, attacking Tommy Dreamer, Bully Ray and Devon and aligning with Team Dixie and Dixie Carter. In late 2014, King Mo was removed from Team Dixie due to his absence from TNA.

When asked in February 2015 if he will appear again for TNA, King Mo stated: "I've always been MMA 100%. If they call me I'll make an appearance. Right now, there is nothing going on in wrestling unless they book me to do something." On July 20, 2015, Mo announced his departure from TNA.

=== Independent circuit (2014, 2019–present) ===
On June 14, 2014, at House of Hardcore 6, King Mo took part in a special Master Lock challenge from Chris Masters along with other wrestlers in the end, King Mo was able to avoid being to put in The Masterlock and he was able to put Masters in a leg lock submission making Masters tap out.

=== Return to Impact Wrestling (2017) ===
On June 27, 2017, it was announced that King Mo would make his return to Impact Wrestling and be in Lashley's corner for his Impact Wrestling World Heavyweight Championship match at Slammiversary.

=== Major League Wrestling (2019–2021) ===
On November 8, 2019, Mo wore an MLW shirt during his entrance to his final fight for Bellator. The following morning it was announced that he had signed an exclusive deal with the promotion and would be making his debut for the promotion at their next TV taping. He won his debut match for the promotion, which aired on their Thanksgiving episode of MLW Fusion via submission. His last match in MLW by now is dated November 10, 2021 on the 8th episode of MLW Fusion ALPHA Series.

== Bare-knuckle boxing ==
In his bareknuckle boxing debut, Lawal was scheduled to face current BKFC Middleweight Champion David Mundell in a light heavyweight bout on September 13, 2024, at BKFC 66. However, Lawal withdrew from the bout for unknown reasons.

== Personal life ==
Lawal's parents are Muslim immigrants from Nigeria. Lawal was born in Murfreesboro, Tennessee. He has a younger brother named Abdullah and a younger sister named Aminat. The three were raised by a single mother, "My mom (Nike Rouseau) pretty much raised us all. My dad was never around." Muhammed's father committed suicide when Lawal was twenty years old.

After his fight with Larkin, Lawal was diagnosed with Staphylococcus obtained from knee surgery. Lawal had a fever of 103 degrees, and the infection ate away at parts of his hip and legs, "I had this moment where I was like, man, I can see my hip bone. I was ripped still. I had an eight-pack. But there's my hip bone. I looked at my leg, and it looked like those zombies from The Walking Dead. I feel like I looked death in the face, and I survived."

== Championships and accomplishments ==
=== Mixed martial arts ===
- Bellator MMA
  - Bellator 2013 Summer Series Light Heavyweight Tournament Championship
  - Tied (with Liam McGeary) for most knockout wins in Bellator Light Heavyweight division history (5)
- Rizin Fighting Federation
  - Rizin 2015 World Grand Prix Championship
- Strikeforce
  - Strikeforce Light Heavyweight Championship (One time)
- Bleacher Report
  - 2015 Comeback Fighter of the Year

=== Amateur wrestling ===
- International Federation of Associated Wrestling Styles
  - 2007 Hargobind International Tournament Senior Freestyle Gold Medalist
  - 2007 Alexander Medved International Senior Freestyle Silver Medalist
  - 2007 Pan American Championships Senior Freestyle Gold Medalist
  - 2007 World Cup Senior Freestyle Silver Medalist
  - 2007 Takhti Cup Senior Freestyle Gold Medalist
  - 2006 Golden Grand Prix Senior Freestyle Bronze Medalist
  - 2006 Uzbekistan Independence Cup Golden Grand Prix Senior Freestyle Gold Medalist
  - 2006 Yasar Dogu International Senior Freestyle Gold Medalist
  - 2006 Dave Schultz Memorial International Open Senior Freestyle Gold Medalist
  - 2005 Dave Schultz Memorial International Open Senior Freestyle Silver Medalist
  - 2004 Clan International Championships Senior Freestyle Silver Medalist
  - 2004 Dave Schultz Memorial International Open Senior Freestyle Bronze Medalist
  - 2004 FILA Manitoba Open Senior Freestyle Silver Medalist
  - 2003 Sunkist Kids International Open Senior Freestyle Bronze Medalist
- USA Wrestling
  - USA Senior Freestyle National Championship (2005, 2006, 2008)
  - USA University Freestyle National Championship (2003)
  - 2006 NYAC Christmas Championships Senior Freestyle Gold Medalist
  - 2005 FILA World Team Trials Senior Freestyle Winner
  - 2004 NYAC Christmas Championships Senior Freestyle Silver Medalist
- National Collegiate Athletic Association
  - NCAA Division I All-American (2003)
  - Big 12 Conference Championship (2003)
  - NCAA Division II Collegiate Championship (2002)
  - NCAA Division II All-American (2001, 2002)
- University Interscholastic League
  - UIL High School Texas State Championship (1999)
  - UIL High School All-State (1997, 1998, 1999)

=== Wrestling ===
- Real Pro Wrestling
  - RPW Season One 184 lb Championship

=== Professional wrestling ===
- Vendetta Pro Wrestling
  - Vendetty Award: 2015 Vendetta Pro Match of the Year (as Special Guest Enforcer)

== See also ==
- List of male mixed martial artists
- List of current Bellator fighters

Preceded by Gegard Mousasi	4th Strikeforce Light Heavyweight Champion; April 17, 2010 – August 21, 2010	Succeeded by Rafael Cavalcante
