= List of Strikeforce champions =

Strikeforce Men's World Championship belt

Strikeforce Women's World Championship belt

Strikeforce was an American mixed martial arts organization. It crowned male champions in the lightweight, welterweight, middleweight, light heavyweight and heavyweight divisions, and female champions in featherweight and bantamweight.

== World champions ==
=== Men's championships ===
==== Heavyweight Championship ====
206 pounds (93 kg) to 265 pounds (120 kg)

No.	Name	Event	Date	Reign	Defenses
1	(Netherlands) Alistair Overeem def. Paul Buentello	Strikeforce: Four Men Enter, One Man Survives; San Jose, CA, USA	November 16, 2007	1,351 days	1. def. Brett Rogers at Strikeforce: Heavy Artillery on May 15, 2010
Overeem vacated the title on July 29, 2011 when his contract was absorbed by the UFC.

==== Light Heavyweight Championship ====
186 pounds (84 kg) to 205 pounds (93 kg)

No.	Name	Event	Date	Reign	Defenses
1	(United States) Bobby Southworth def. Vernon White	Strikeforce: Triple Threat; San Jose, CA, USA	December 8, 2006	714 days	1. def. Anthony Ruiz at Strikeforce: Melendez vs. Thomson on Jun 27, 2008
2	(Brazil) Renato Sobral	Strikeforce: Destruction; San Jose, CA, USA	November 21, 2008	267 days	
3	(Netherlands) Gegard Mousasi	Strikeforce: Carano vs. Cyborg; San Jose, CA, USA	August 15, 2009	245 days	
4	(United States) Muhammed Lawal	Strikeforce: Nashville; Nashville, TN, USA	April 17, 2010	126 days	
5	(Brazil) Rafael Cavalcante	Strikeforce: Houston; Houston, TX, USA days	August 21, 2010	196 days	
6	(United States) Dan Henderson	Strikeforce: Feijão vs. Henderson; Columbus, OH, USA	March 5, 2011	198 days	
Henderson vacated the title on September 19, 2011 when his contract was absorbed by the UFC.

==== Middleweight Championship ====
171 pounds (78 kg) to 185 pounds (84 kg)

No.	Name	Event	Date	Reign	Defenses
1	(United States) Frank Shamrock def. Phil Baroni	Strikeforce: Shamrock vs. Baroni; San Jose, CA, USA	June 22, 2007	281 days	
2	(United States) Cung Le	Strikeforce: Shamrock vs. Le; San Jose, CA, USA	March 29, 2008	588 days	
Le vacated the title on September 17, 2009 due to filming obligations.
3	(United States) Jake Shields def. Jason Miller	Strikeforce: Fedor vs Rogers; Hoffman Estates, IL, USA	November 7, 2009	287 days	1. def. Dan Henderson at Strikeforce: Nashville on Apr 17, 2010
Shields vacated the title on July 1, 2010 when signed with the UFC.
4	(Brazil) Ronaldo Souza def. Tim Kennedy	Strikeforce: Houston; Houston, TX, USA	August 21, 2010	385 days	1. def. Robbie Lawler at Strikeforce: Diaz vs. Cyborg on Jan 29, 2011
5	(United States) Luke Rockhold	Strikeforce: Barnett vs. Kharitonov; Cincinnati, OH, USA	September 10, 2011	490 days	1. def. Keith Jardine at Strikeforce: Rockhold vs. Jardine on Jan 7, 2012; 2. def. Tim Kennedy at Strikeforce: Rockhold vs. Kennedy on Jul 14, 2012
The Strikeforce Middleweight title was vacated after the Strikeforce banner was dissolved into the UFC on January 12, 2013.

==== Welterweight Championship ====
156 pounds (71 kg) to 170 pounds (77 kg)

No.	Name	Event	Date	Reign	Defenses
1	(United States) Nick Diaz def. Marius Žaromskis	Strikeforce: Miami; Sunrise, FL, USA	January 30, 2010	495 days	1. def. K. J. Noons at Strikeforce: Diaz vs. Noons II on Oct 9, 2010; 2. def. Evangelista Santos at Strikeforce: Diaz vs. Cyborg on Jan 29, 2011; 3. def. Paul Daley at Strikeforce: Diaz vs. Daley on Apr 9, 2011
Diaz vacated the title on June 9, 2011 when his contract was absorbed by the UFC.
2	(United States) Nate Marquardt def. Tyron Woodley	Strikeforce: Rockhold vs. Kennedy; Portland, OR, USA	July 14, 2012	182 days	
3	(Belgium) Tarec Saffiedine	Strikeforce: Marquardt vs. Saffiedine; Oklahoma City, Oklahoma, USA	January 12, 2013	0 days	
The Strikeforce Welterweight title was vacated after the Strikeforce banner was dissolved into the UFC on January 12, 2013.

==== Lightweight Championship ====
146 pounds (66 kg) to 155 pounds (70 kg)

No.	Name	Event	Date	Reign	Defenses
1	(United States) Clay Guida def. Josh Thomson	Strikeforce: Shamrock vs. Gracie; San Jose, CA, USA	March 10, 2006	91 days	
2	(United States) Gilbert Melendez	Strikeforce: Revenge; San Jose, CA, USA	June 9, 2006	749 days	1. def. Gabe Lemley at Strikeforce: Shamrock vs. Le on March 29, 2008
3	(United States) Josh Thomson	Strikeforce: Melendez vs. Thomson; San Jose, CA, USA	June 27, 2008	540 days	
—	(United States) Gilbert Melendez def. Rodrigo Damm for interim title	Strikeforce: Shamrock vs. Diaz; San Jose, CA, USA	April 11, 2009	—	1. def. Mitsuhiro Ishida at Strikeforce: Carano vs. Cyborg on Aug 15, 2009
4	(United States) Gilbert Melendez (2)	Strikeforce: Evolution; San Jose, CA, USA	December 19, 2009	1,218 days	1. def. Shinya Aoki at Strikeforce: Nashville on Apr 17, 2010; 2. def. Tatsuya Kawajiri at Strikeforce: Diaz vs. Daley on Apr 9, 2011; 3. def. Jorge Masvidal at Strikeforce: Melendez vs. Masvidal on Dec 17, 2011; 4. def. Josh Thomson at Strikeforce: Barnett vs. Cormier on May 19, 2012
The Strikeforce Lightweight Title was unified with the UFC Lightweight Title on April 20, 2013, when Benson Henderson defeated Melendez at UFC on Fox: Henderson vs. Melendez.

=== Women's championships ===
==== Women's Featherweight Championship ====
136 pounds (62 kg) to 145 pounds (66 kg) Formerly known as the Women's Lightweight Championship and the Women's Middleweight Championship

No.	Name	Event	Date	Reign	Defenses
1	(Brazil) Cris Cyborg def. Gina Carano	Strikeforce: Carano vs. Cyborg; San Jose, CA, USA	August 15, 2009	874 days	1. def. Marloes Coenen at Strikeforce: Miami on Jan 30, 2010; 2. def. Jan Finney at Strikeforce: Fedor vs. Werdum on Jun 26, 2010; NC. vs. Hiroko Yamanaka at Strikeforce: Melendez vs. Masvidal on Dec 17, 2011
Cyborg was stripped of the title on January 6, 2012 after testing positive for anabolic steroids in a post-fight drug test.

==== Women's Bantamweight Championship ====
126 pounds (57 kg) to 135 pounds (61 kg) Formerly known as the Women's Welterweight Championship

No.	Name	Event	Date	Reign	Defenses
1	(Canada) Sarah Kaufman def. Takayo Hashi	Strikeforce Challengers: Kaufman vs. Hashi; San Jose, CA, USA	February 26, 2010	225 days	1. def. Roxanne Modafferi at Strikeforce Challengers: del Rosario vs. Mahe on Jul 23, 2010
2	(Netherlands) Marloes Coenen	Strikeforce: Diaz vs. Noons II; San Jose, CA, USA	October 9, 2010	294 days	1. def. Liz Carmouche at Strikeforce: Feijao vs. Henderson on Mar 5th, 2011
3	(United States) Miesha Tate	Strikeforce: Fedor vs. Henderson; Hoffman Estates, IL, USA	July 30, 2011	217 days	
4	(United States) Ronda Rousey	Strikeforce: Tate vs. Rousey; Columbus, OH, USA	March 3, 2012	278 days	1. def. Sarah Kaufman at Strikeforce: Rousey vs. Kaufman on Aug 18, 2012
The title was vacated on December 6, 2012 when Rousey became the first UFC Women's Bantamweight Champion.

== U.S. champions ==
=== Middleweight U.S. Championship ===
170 pounds (77 kg) to 185 pounds (84 kg)

No.	Name	Event	Date	Reign	Defenses
1	(United States) Eugene Jackson def. Ronald Jhun	Strikeforce: Triple Threat; San Jose, CA, USA	December 8, 2006	2,227 days	
The Strikeforce Middleweight U.S. title was vacated after the Strikeforce banner was dissolved into the UFC on January 12, 2013.

=== Lightweight U.S. Championship ===
145 pounds (66 kg) to 155 pounds (70 kg)

No.	Name	Event	Date	Reign	Defenses
1	(United States) Josh Thomson def. Nam Phan	Strikeforce: Triple Threat; San Jose, CA, USA	December 8, 2006	2,227 days	1. def. Nick Gonzalez at Strikeforce: Shamrock vs. Baroni on Jun 22, 2007
The Strikeforce Lightweight U.S. title was vacated after the Strikeforce banner was dissolved into the UFC on January 12, 2013.

== Tournament winners ==
Event	Division	Winner	Runner-up	Date
Strikeforce: Four Men Enter, One Man Survives	Middleweight	(Brazil) Jorge Santiago	(South Africa) Trevor Prangley	November 17, 2007
Strikeforce Challengers: Riggs vs. Taylor	Women's Bantamweight	(United States) Miesha Tate	(Japan) Hitomi Akano	August 13, 2010
Strikeforce: Barnett vs. Cormier	Heavyweight	(United States) Daniel Cormier	(United States) Josh Barnett	May 19, 2012

== Records ==
=== Most wins in title bouts ===
Title wins	Champion	Division	V	D	NC	L
9	(United States) Gilbert Melendez	Lightweight	9	0	0	1
4	(United States) Nick Diaz	Welterweight	4	0	0	1
3	(Brazil) Cristiane Justino	Women's Featherweight	3	0	1	0
3	(United States) Luke Rockhold	Middleweight	3	0	0	0
2	(United States) Bobby Southworth	Light Heavyweight	2	0	0	1
2	(Canada) Sarah Kaufman	Women's Bantamweight	2	0	0	1
2	(Brazil) Ronaldo Souza	Middleweight	2	0	0	1
2	(Netherlands) Marloes Coenen	Women's Bantamweight	2	0	0	1
2	(United States) Jake Shields	Middleweight	2	0	0	0
2	(Netherlands) Alistair Overeem	Heavyweight	2	0	0	0
2	(United States) Ronda Rousey	Women's Bantamweight	2	0	0	0

=== Most consecutive title defenses ===
Defenses	Champion	Division	Period
4	(United States) Gilbert Melendez	Lightweight	April 19, 2009 – January 12, 2013
3	(United States) Nick Diaz	Welterweight	January 30, 2010 – June 9, 2011
2	(Brazil) Cristiane Justino	Women's Featherweight	August 15, 2009 – January 6, 2012
2	(United States) Luke Rockhold	Middleweight	September 10, 2011 – January 12, 2013
1	(United States) Bobby Southworth	Light Heavyweight	December 8, 2006 – November 21, 2008
1	(United States) Jake Shields	Middleweight	November 7, 2009 – July 1, 2010
1	(Netherlands) Alistair Overeem	Heavyweight	November 16, 2007 – July 29, 2011
1	(Canada) Sarah Kaufman	Women's Bantamweight	February 26, 2010 – October 9, 2010
1	(Brazil) Ronaldo Souza	Middleweight	August 21, 2010 – September 10, 2011
1	(Netherlands) Marloes Coenen	Women's Bantamweight	October 9, 2010 – July 30, 2011
1	(United States) Ronda Rousey	Women's Bantamweight	March 3, 2012 – December 6, 2012

== Champions by nationality ==
The division champions include only linear and true champions. Interim champions who have never become linear champions will be listed as interim champions. Fighters with multiple title reigns in a specific division will also be counted once. Runners-up are not included in tournaments champions.

Country	Division champions	Tournaments champions	Total
United States	14	2	16
Brazil	4	1	5
Netherlands	3	—	3
Belgium	1	—	1
Canada	1	—	1
Vietnam	1	—	1

== See also ==
- List of Strikeforce alumni
- List of Strikeforce events
- List of current mixed martial arts champions
- List of Bellator MMA champions
- List of Dream champions
- List of EliteXC champions
- List of Invicta FC champions
- List of ONE Championship champions
- List of Pancrase champions
- List of Pride champions
- List of PFL champions
- List of Shooto champions
- List of UFC champions
- List of WEC champions
- Mixed martial arts weight classes
