= List of Extreme Challenge events =

List of combat-sports events held under the Extreme Challenge brand

Extreme Challenge is an American mixed martial arts promotion. This list compiles 241 completed event records documented by Tapology, Sherdog and CombatReg.

== Past events ==
Completed event records
Event	Date	Venue and location	Source
Extreme Challenge 1	November 23, 1996	Supertoad Entertainment Center, Des Moines, Iowa, United States	
Extreme Challenge 2	February 1, 1997	Supertoad Entertainment Center, Des Moines, Iowa, United States	
Extreme Challenge 3	February 15, 1997	RiverCenter, Davenport, Iowa, United States	
Extreme Challenge 4	February 22, 1997	Council Bluffs, Iowa	
Extreme Challenge 5	April 18, 1997	Waterloo, Iowa	
Extreme Challenge 6	May 10, 1997	Battle Creek, Michigan	
Extreme Challenge 7	June 25, 1997	Council Bluffs, Iowa	
Extreme Challenge 8	August 9, 1997	Iowa	
Extreme Challenge 9	August 30, 1997	Davenport, Iowa	
Extreme Challenge 10	October 4, 1997	Des Moines, Iowa	
Extreme Challenge Trials	November 15, 1997	Davenport, Iowa, United States	
Extreme Challenge 11	November 22, 1997	Marshaltown, Iowa	
Extreme Challenge 12	December 13, 1997	Kalamazoo, Michigan	
Extreme Challenge 13	January 16, 1998	Kenosha, Wisconsin	
Extreme Challenge Trials	February 7, 1998	US	
Extreme Challenge 14	February 13, 1998	Hammond, Indiana	
Extreme Challenge 15	February 27, 1998	The Fieldhouse, Munice, Indiana	
Extreme Challenge 16	March 26, 1998	Council Bluffs, Iowa	
Extreme Challenge 17	April 11, 1998	Indianapolis, Indiana	
Extreme Challenge	April 18, 1998	Davenport, Iowa, United States	
18 - Extreme Challenge 18	May 2, 1998	Davenport, Iowa, United States	
Extreme Challenge 18	May 15, 1998	Davenport, Iowa, United States	
Extreme Challenge 19	June 20, 1998	Hayward, Wisconsin	
Extreme Challenge 20	August 22, 1998	Davenport, Iowa	
Extreme Challenge 21	October 17, 1998	Hayward, Wisconsin	
Extreme Challenge 22	November 21, 1998	West Valley City, Utah	
Extreme Challenge Trials	December 5, 1998	Davenport, Iowa, United States	
Extreme Challenge 23	April 2, 1999	Indianapolis, Indiana	
Extreme Challenge 24	May 15, 1999	Salt Lake City, Utah	
Extreme Challenge 25	June 11, 1999	Council Bluffs, Iowa	
Extreme Challenge Trials	June 25, 1999	Ohio, United States	
Extreme Challenge 26	July 21, 1999	Peoria, Illinois	
Extreme Challenge 27	August 21, 1999	Davenport, Iowa	
Extreme Challenge Trials	October 4, 1999	Mason City, Iowa, United States	
Extreme Challenge 28	October 9, 1999	Ogden, Utah	
Extreme Challenge Trials	November 6, 1999	Davenport, Iowa, United States	
Extreme Challenge 29	November 13, 1999	Hayward, Wisconsin	
Extreme Challenge 30	November 14, 1999	Council Bluffs, Iowa, United States	
30 - Extreme Challenge 30	December 1, 1999	Harvey's Casino, Council Bluffs, Iowa, United States	
Extreme Challenge 31	March 24, 2000	Kenosha, Wisconsin	
Extreme Challenge Trials	April 22, 2000	Davenport, Iowa, United States	
Extreme Challenge 32	May 21, 2000	Springfield, Illinois	
Extreme Challenge 33	June 10, 2000	Council Bluffs, Iowa	
Extreme Challenge 34	June 17, 2000	Hayward, Wisconsin	
Extreme Challenge 35	June 29, 2000	Davenport, Iowa	
Extreme Challenge Trials: July 2000	July 29, 2000	Pig Pen Nightclub, Clinton, Iowa, United States	
Extreme Challenge 36	August 26, 2000	Davenport, Iowa	
Extreme Challenge 38	November 16, 2000	Council Bluffs, Iowa	
Extreme Challenge Trials: MMA Nationals	January 20, 2001	Eagles Club, Springfield, Illinois, United States	
Extreme Challenge 39	April 7, 2001	Stars & Stripes Nightclub, Davenport, Iowa, United States	
Extreme Challenge Trials: April 2001	April 20, 2001	Bloomington, Minnesota, United States	
Extreme Challenge 40	June 16, 2001	Springfield, Illinois	
Extreme Challenge 41	July 13, 2001	Davenport, Iowa	
Extreme Challenge Trials	July 28, 2001	Clinton, Iowa, United States	
Extreme Challenge 42	August 24, 2001	Davenport, Iowa	
Extreme Challenge Trials: August 2001	August 25, 2001	Annie's Nightclub, Cincinnati, Ohio, United States	
Extreme Challenge 43	September 8, 2001	Orem, Utah	
Extreme Challenge 44	September 15, 2001	Lake Charles, Louisiana	
Extreme Challenge Trials	October 7, 2001	Decatur, Illinois, United States	
Extreme Challenge Trials: November 2001	November 17, 2001	Stars & Stripes Nightclub, Davenport, Iowa, United States	
Extreme Challenge	November 29, 2001	Mount Healthy, Ohio, United States	
Extreme Challenge Trials	January 5, 2002	Davenport, Iowa, United States	
Extreme Challenge	January 19, 2002	Mount Healthy, Ohio, United States	
Extreme Challenge 46	February 16, 2002	7 Flags Event Center in Clive, Iowa	
Extreme Challenge Trials	March 9, 2002	Davenport, Iowa, United States	
Extreme Challenge 47	March 16, 2002	McKay Events Center, Orem, Utah	
Extreme Challenge Trials: May 2002	May 18, 2002	Spikers Grill & Beach Club, Fridley, Minnesota, United States	
Extreme Challenge Trials: July 2002	July 20, 2002	Spears Boxing School, Mount Healthy, Ohio, United States	
Extreme Challenge 48	July 27, 2002	Meskwaki Casino & Hotel, Tama, Iowa	
Extreme Challenge Trials: MMA Nationals	December 14, 2002	Stars & Stripes Nightclub, Davenport, Iowa, United States	
Extreme Challenge 49	February 8, 2003	Stars & Stripes NightclubDavenport, Iowa	
Extreme Challenge 50	February 23, 2003	Saltair PavilionSalt Lake City, Utah	
Extreme Challenge 51	August 2, 2003	St. Charles, Illinois	
Extreme Challenge 52	August 15, 2003	Rock Island, Illinois	
Extreme Challenge 53	September 13, 2003	Gateway CenterIowa City, Iowa	
Extreme Challenge 54	October 12, 2003	Lake Moore Banquet HallLake Moore, Illinois	
Extreme Challenge 55	December 5, 2003	Lakemoor, Illinois	
Extreme Challenge 56	March 26, 2004	Medina, Minnesota, United States	
Extreme Challenge 57	May 6, 2004	Harrah's Casino Council Bluffs, Iowa	
Extreme Challenge 58	June 11, 2004	Playoff Sports ClubMedina, Minnesota	
Extreme Challenge 59	September 24, 2004	Medina Entertainment CenterMedina, Minnesota	
Extreme Challenge 60	November 12, 2004	Medina, Minnesota	
Extreme Challenge 61	April 22, 2005	Lakeside Casino Osceola, Iowa USA	
Extreme Challenge 62	June 18, 2005	Medina, Minnesota	
Extreme Challenge 63	July 23, 2005	Hayward, Wisconsin	
Extreme Challenge 64	October 15, 2005	Terrible's Lakeside Casino, Osceola, Iowa	
Extreme Challenge 65	October 21, 2005	Medina, Minn	
Extreme Challenge 66	February 17, 2006	Medina, Minnesota	
Extreme Challenge 67	June 30, 2006	Medina, Minnesota, United States	
Extreme Challenge 68	July 15, 2006	LCO Casino, Hayward, Wis	
Extreme Challenge 69	July 22, 2006	RiverCenterDavenport, Iowa	
Extreme Challenge 70	August 26, 2006	Hayward, Wisconsin	
Extreme Challenge 71	October 7, 2006	Bass Street LandingMoline, Illinois	
Extreme Challenge 72	October 21, 2006	Medina Entertainment CenterMedina, Minnesota	
Extreme Challenge 73	October 28, 2006	RiverCenterDavenport, Iowa	
Extreme Challenge 74	March 10, 2007	Iowa City, Iowa	
Extreme Challenge 75	March 23, 2007	Sovereign Bank Arena, Trenton, New Jersey, United States	
Extreme Challenge 76	March 31, 2007	Sloan, Iowa	
Extreme Challenge Trials	March 31, 2007	Mahwah, New Jersey, United States	
Extreme Challenge Trials	April 22, 2007	New Jersey, United States	
Extreme Challenge 77	April 28, 2007	Mason, Ohio	
Extreme Challenge Trials	April 28, 2007	Rahway, New Jersey, United States	
Extreme Challenge Trials	May 19, 2007	Delaware, United States	
Extreme Challenge 78	June 9, 2007	Asbury Park Convention Hall, Asbury Park, New Jersey, United States	
Extreme Challenge Trials	June 9, 2007	New Jersey, United States	
79 - Extreme Challenge 79	June 16, 2007	Davenport, Iowa, United States	
Extreme Challenge 79	July 16, 2007	Davenport, Iowa, United States	
Extreme Challenge 80	July 20, 2007	Lakeside Casino, Osceola, Iowa	
Extreme Challenge 81	July 28, 2007	South Mountain Area, West Orange, New Jersey, United States	
Extreme Challenge 82	August 18, 2007	Springfield, Illinois	
Extreme Challenge 83	September 1, 2007	Riverside, Iowa	
Extreme Challenge 85	October 6, 2007	Bismarck, North Dakota	
Extreme Challenge 86	January 26, 2008	Illinois	
Extreme Challenge 87	January 26, 2008	Hedrick, Iowa	
Extreme Challenge 88	February 16, 2008	Quincy, Illinois	
Extreme Challenge 89	February 23, 2008	Decatur, Illinois	
Extreme Challenge 90	February 29, 2008	Ft. Dodge, Iowa	
Extreme Challenge 91	March 8, 2008	Kirksville, Missouri, United States	
Extreme Challenge Trials	March 15, 2008	Davenport, Iowa, United States	
Extreme Challenge 92	March 22, 2008	Loves Park, Illinois	
Extreme Challenge 93	April 19, 2008	Quincy, Illinois	
Extreme Challenge 94	April 19, 2008	Danville, Illinois	
Extreme Challenge 95	April 26, 2008	Oskaloosa, Iowa	
Extreme Challenge 96	May 10, 2008	Davenport, Iowa	
Extreme Challenge 97	May 17, 2008	Fort Dodge, Iowa, United States	
Extreme Challenge 98	May 30, 2008	Iowa, United States	
Extreme Challenge 99	May 31, 2008	Springfield, Illinois	
Extreme Challenge 100	June 28, 2008	Iowa	
Extreme Challenge 101	July 11, 2008	Franklin, Wisconsin	
Extreme Challenge 102	July 18, 2008	Elmore County, Alabama, United States	
Extreme Challenge 103	July 19, 2008	Quincy, Illinois, United States	
Extreme Challenge 103	July 19, 2008	Illinois, United States	
Extreme Challenge 104	August 23, 2008	Lancaster, Wisconsin, United States	
Extreme Challenge 105	August 25, 2008	Iowa, United States	
Extreme Challenge 106	September 19, 2008	Riverside, Iowa	
Extreme Challenge 107	September 20, 2008	Osceola, California	
Extreme Challenge Trials	September 20, 2008	Quincy, Illinois, United States	
Extreme Challenge 108	October 4, 2008	Iowa, United States	
Extreme Challenge 109	October 18, 2008	I Wireless Center, Moline, Ill.	
Extreme Challenge 110	November 7, 2008	Franklin, Wisconsin, United States	
Extreme Challenge 111	November 21, 2008	Horseshoe Casino, Elizabeth, Ind.	
Extreme Challenge 112	November 22, 2008	Quincy, Illinois, United States	
Extreme Challenge 113	November 29, 2008	Iowa, United States	
Extreme Challenge 114	November 29, 2008	Rockford, Illinois, United States	
Extreme Challenge 115	January 23, 2009	Atlantic City, New Jersey, United States	
Extreme Challenge 118	January 31, 2009	Minnesota, United States	
Extreme Challenge 119	January 31, 2009	Rochester, Minnesota, United States	
Extreme Challenge 120	February 21, 2009	Iowa, United States	
Extreme Challenge 116	February 28, 2009	Peoria, Illinois, United States	
Extreme Challenge 117	March 7, 2009	Loves Park, Illinois, United States	
Extreme Challenge 121	March 14, 2009	Iowa, United States	
Extreme Challenge 122	March 14, 2009	Savoy, Illinois, United States	
Extreme Challenge 125	March 20, 2009	Burlington, Iowa, United States	
Extreme Challenge 126	March 28, 2009	Atlantic City, New Jersey, United States	
Extreme Challenge - Rumble at the Temple	April 18, 2009	Tebala Shrine Temple, Rockford, Ill.	
Extreme Challenge 127	April 25, 2009	Iowa, United States	
Extreme Challenge 128	May 30, 2009	Rochester, Minnesota, United States	
Extreme Challenge 129	June 6, 2009	Atlantic City, New Jersey, United States	
Extreme Challenge 130	June 25, 2009	Carl Craft Civic Center, Hedrick, Iowa, United States	
Extreme Challenge 131	July 18, 2009	Sioux City, Iowa, United States	
Extreme Challenge 132	July 25, 2009	Quincy, Illinois, United States	
Extreme Challenge 134	August 29, 2009	Cedar Rapids, Iowa, USA	
Extreme Challenge Trials	August 29, 2009	Cedar Rapids, Iowa, United States	
Extreme Challenge 135	September 12, 2009	Osceola, Iowa, USA	
Extreme Challenge 136	September 26, 2009	Iowa, United States	
Extreme Challenge 138	October 3, 2009	Rochester, Minnesota, United States	
Extreme Challenge 137	October 17, 2009	Iowa, United States	
Extreme Challenge 140	November 20, 2009	East Peoria, Illinois, United States	
Extreme Challenge 140	November 21, 2009	Par-a-Dice Casino Hotel, East Peoria, Illinois, United States	
Extreme Challenge 141	December 5, 2009	Lewis Bowl Annex, Sioux City, Iowa, United States	
Extreme Challenge 149	March 27, 2010	Council Bluffs, Iowa, United States	
Extreme Challenge 150	April 10, 2010	Quincy, Illinois, United States	
Extreme Challenge 151	April 17, 2010	Rockford, Illinois, United States	
Extreme Challenge 153	June 19, 2010	Quincy, Illinois, United States	
Extreme Challenge 154	July 10, 2010	Mt. Pleasant, Michigan, United States	
Extreme Challenge 155	July 10, 2010	Poopy's Grub N Pub, Savanna, Illinois, United States	
Extreme Challenge 156	July 16, 2010	Council Bluffs, Iowa, United States	
Extreme Challenge 158	July 21, 2010	Rock Island County Fair, Rock Island, Illinois, United States	
Extreme Challenge 159	August 13, 2010	Elkhart, Indiana, United States	
Extreme Challenge 160	September 11, 2010	Lewis Bowl Annex, Sioux City, Iowa, United States	
Extreme Challenge 162	October 1, 2010	Council Bluffs, Iowa, United States	
Extreme Challenge 163	October 2, 2010	Quincy, Illinois, United States	
Extreme Challenge 165	October 16, 2010	Southern Iowa Fairgrounds, Oskaloosa, Iowa, United States	
Extreme Challenge 168	November 20, 2010	East Peoria, Illinois, United States	
Extreme Challenge 169	November 23, 2010	Council Bluffs, Iowa, United States	
Extreme Challenge - Final Fight	November 24, 2010	Harrah's Council Bluffs, Council Bluffs, Iowa, United States	
Extreme Challenge 170	December 11, 2010	Minneapolis, Minnesota, United States	
Extreme Challenge 171	January 15, 2011	Burlington, Iowa, United States	
Extreme Challenge 174	January 29, 2011	Sioux City, Iowa, United States	
Extreme Challenge 175	January 29, 2011	Bettendorf, Iowa, United States	
Extreme Challenge 177	February 10, 2011	Council Bluffs, Iowa, United States	
Extreme Challenge 176	February 11, 2011	Iowa, United States	
Extreme Challenge 178	April 9, 2011	Oskaloosa, Iowa, United States	
Extreme Challenge 181	April 14, 2011	Council Bluffs, Iowa, United States	
Extreme Challenge 181	April 15, 2011	Harrah's Council Bluffs, Council Bluffs, Iowa, United States	
Extreme Challenge 182	April 30, 2011	Bettendorf, Iowa, United States	
Extreme Challenge 183	May 14, 2011	Black River Falls, Wisconsin, United States	
Extreme Challenge 184	June 4, 2011	Cedar Rapids, Iowa, United States	
Extreme Challenge 187	July 23, 2011	Cedar Rapids, Iowa, United States	
Extreme Challenge 188	July 23, 2011	Target Center, Minneapolis, Minnesota, United States	
Extreme Challenge 191	August 26, 2011	Bettendorf, Iowa, United States	
Extreme Challenge 192	August 27, 2011	Burllington, Iowa, United States	
Extreme Challenge 193	September 10, 2011	Illinois, United States	
Extreme Challenge 196	October 8, 2011	Southern Iowa Fairgrounds, Oskaloosa, Iowa, United States	
Extreme Challenge 199	November 19, 2011	Bettendorf, Iowa, United States	
Extreme Challenge 200	November 23, 2011	1 Harrah's Blvd, Council Bluffs, Iowa, United States	
Extreme Challenge 201	January 14, 2012	Memorial Auditorium, Burlington, Iowa, United States	
Extreme Challenge 202	January 28, 2012	Bettendorf, Iowa, United States	
Extreme Challenge 203	January 29, 2012	Quad-Cities Waterfront Convention Center, Bettendorf, Iowa, United States	
Extreme Challenge 204	February 11, 2012	Freeport Masonic Temple, Freeport, Illinois, United States	
Extreme Challenge 205	February 18, 2012	Quincy, Illinois, United States	
Extreme Challenge 206	March 30, 2012	Fairfield Arts and Convention Center, Fairfield, Iowa, United States	
Extreme Challenge 207	April 14, 2012	Southern Iowa Fairgrounds, Oskaloosa, Iowa, United States	
Extreme Challenge 209	May 4, 2012	Bettendorf, Iowa, United States	
Extreme Challenge 211	May 12, 2012	Omar Shrine Temple, Mount Pleasant, South Carolina, United States	
Extreme Challenge 212	June 2, 2012	Veterans Memorial Stadium, Cedar Rapids, Iowa, United States	
Extreme Challenge 213	July 7, 2012	Fairfield Arts and Convention Center, Fairfield, Iowa, United States	
Extreme Challenge 214	July 14, 2012	Savanna, Illinois, United States	
Extreme Challenge 215	July 28, 2012	Oakley Lindsay Center, Quincy, Illinois, United States	
Extreme Challenge 216	July 28, 2012	Cedar Rapids, Iowa, United States	
Extreme Challenge 217	August 11, 2012	Burlington, Iowa, United States	
Extreme Challenge 218	August 25, 2012	Bettendorf, Iowa, United States	
Extreme Challenge 220	October 20, 2012	WinnaVegas Casino, Sloan, Iowa, United States	
Extreme Challenge 223	January 12, 2013	Memorial Auditorium, Burlington, Iowa, United States	
Extreme Challenge 224	January 25, 2013	Isle of Capri Casino, Bettendorf, Iowa, United States	
Extreme Challenge 226	March 2, 2013	Sloan, Iowa United States	
Extreme Challenge 227	May 3, 2013	Bettendorf, Iowa, United States	
Extreme Challenge 228	August 3, 2013	Burlington, Iowa, United States	
Extreme Challenge 229	September 14, 2013	Sloan, Iowa, United States	
Extreme Challenge 231	May 19, 2014	Quad Cities Waterfront Convention Center, Bettendorf, Iowa, United States	
Extreme Challenge 232	May 30, 2015	Wild Rose Casino, Clinton, Iowa, United States	
Extreme Challenge 233	May 7, 2016	Wild Rose Casino, Clinton, Iowa, United States	
Extreme Challenge 234	April 15, 2017	Wild Rose Casino and Resort, Jefferson, Iowa, United States	
Extreme Challenge 235	June 3, 2017	Wild Rose Casino and Resort, Clinton, Iowa, United States	
Extreme Challenge 236	September 30, 2017	Wild Rose Casino and Resort, Jefferson, Iowa, United States	
Extreme Challenge 237	June 30, 2018	Wild Rose Casino of Clinton, Clinton, Iowa, United States	
Extreme Challenge 238	October 20, 2018	Wild Rose Casino, Jefferson, Iowa, United States	
Extreme Challenge 239	September 12, 2020	Wild Rose Casino, Jefferson, Iowa, United States	
Extreme Challenge Boxing: Horn vs. Smith	September 19, 2020	Wild Rose Casino, Iowa, United States	
Extreme Challenge 240	May 18, 2024	Wild Rose Casino & Resort, Jefferson, Iowa, United States	
Extreme Challenge 241	November 16, 2024	Kris Power Tumbling, Shelbyville, Illinois, United States	

== Cancelled events ==
Event	Scheduled date	Venue and location	Source
Extreme Challenge 238	July 28, 2018	Graham Arena Four, Rochester, Minnesota, United States	
Extreme Challenge 242	August 31, 2024	Kris' Power Tumbling, Shelbyville, Illinois, United States	

== See also ==
- Extreme Challenge (mixed martial arts)
