= Tim Kennedy (fighter) =

American mixed martial artist (born 1979)

Timothy Kennedy
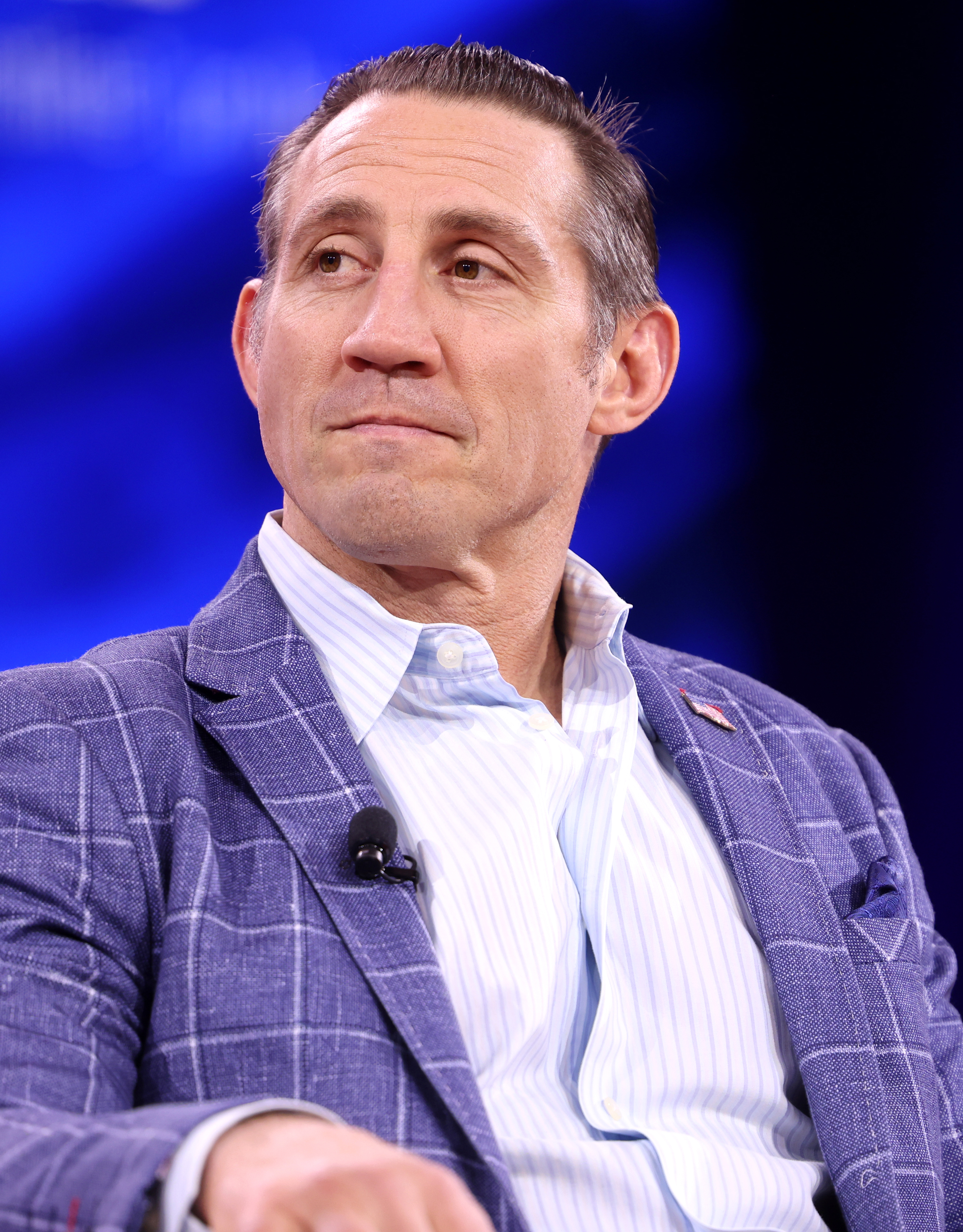
- Kennedy in 2025
- Born: September 1, 1979 (age 47); San Luis Obispo, California, United States
- Height: 5 ft 11 in (180 cm)
- Weight: 185 lb (84 kg; 13.2 st)
- Division: Light Heavyweight; Middleweight; Welterweight
- Reach: 71 in (180 cm)
- Fighting out of: Austin, Texas, United States
- Team: Jackson Wink MMA Academy
- Rank: 3rd degree black belt in Brazilian jiu-jitsu under Royler Gracie; Black belt in Japanese Jujutsu under Terry Keller and Barry Smith; Black belt in Modern Army Combative
- Years active: 2001–2003, 2006–2016

Mixed martial arts record
- Total: 24
- Wins: 18
- By knockout: 6
- By submission: 8
- By decision: 4
- Losses: 6
- By knockout: 3
- By decision: 3

Other information
- Mixed martial arts record from Sherdog
- Military career
- Allegiance: United States
- Branch: United States Army
- Service years: 2004–present
- Units: 7th Special Forces Group; 19th Special Forces Group; 20th Special Forces Group
- Conflicts: Iraq War; War in Afghanistan; Operation Juniper Shield

Timothy Fred Kennedy (born September 1, 1979) is an American soldier and retired mixed martial artist. A professional from 2001 until 2016, he has fought in the UFC, Strikeforce, the WEC, ShoMMA, HDNet Fights and represented the Chicago Red Bears in the IFL. Kennedy is one of the few fighters to simultaneously maintain a professional sporting career and serve in the United States Army, where he is a member of the United States Army Special Forces. He is also a television host, producer, and entrepreneur. In September 2026, he was seriously wounded in action while serving as a private military contractor in the Democratic Republic of the Congo under the employment of Erik Prince.

== Background ==
Kennedy grew up the second son in a Christian family in Atascadero, California. He is of Irish descent. As a youth, Kennedy's mother placed him in cooking and piano lessons. To offset her influence on him, Kennedy's father enrolled Tim and his brother in boxing lessons, wrestling teams, and Japanese ju-jitsu classes.

== Military service ==
Kennedy joined the Army on January 4, 2004, and completed Basic Combat Training, Advanced Individual Training, Airborne School, Special Forces Assessment and Selection and the Special Forces Qualification Course. Kennedy was featured in Dick Couch's book about Green Beret selection called Chosen Soldier under the moniker "Tom Kendall". In 2007, he completed Ranger School and was assigned to the 7th Special Forces Group. During this time he was also a sniper, sniper instructor, and the principal combatives instructor for C Company, 3rd Battalion, 7th Special Forces Group. Kennedy deployed in support of Operation Iraqi Freedom (OIF) and Operation Enduring Freedom (OEF).

In August 2009, Kennedy transitioned from active duty to the Texas Army National Guard, joined 19th Special Forces Group and served in the position of Special Forces Weapons Sergeant, and has continued to serve with the Texas Army National Guard since then.

On April 16, 2017, Kennedy announced his reenlistment into the U.S. Army Special Forces, praising the leadership of Secretary of Defense James Mattis and National Security Adviser H.R. McMaster.

On July 11, 2025, after months of speculation, Yahoo News, citing an apology issued by Kennedy himself and a statement from the Maryland National Guard, published an article stating that Kennedy is under investigation after admitting to lying about his military service record.

== Private security contracting ==
On September 17, 2026, a team including three private military contractors from Vectus Global, a contracting company founded by Blackwater founder Erik Prince, was ambushed in South Kivu by forces aligned with the March 23 Movement (M23) amid the M23 campaign (2022–present). The attack resulted in approximately 20 casualties, with fatalities including seven Congolese and Vectus contractor and New Zealand Special Air Service veteran Justin Conaglen. Two fellow contractors were also wounded, including Kennedy, who received three gunshot wounds to his leg before being evacuated, through Bujumbura and Johannesburg, to receive treatment at the Walter Reed National Military Medical Center.

Several sources indicated the ambush was sophisticated and likely assisted or executed directly by the Rwandan Defence Force, which is known to support M23. They also indicated a surveillance drone used by the Vectus forces may have been tracked to their location and that the ambush took place while they were moving between locations. The three contractors were part of Vectus' work to protect the mining industry of the Democratic Republic of the Congo and its revenues, which have historically been stolen and used to fuel conflicts.

== Mixed martial arts career ==
=== Early career ===
Kennedy began training at Dokan School of Martial Arts in Atascadero, California under Terry Kelly and Barry Smith. In 1999, Kennedy began training with Chuck Liddell, Jake Shields, Gan McGee, and John Hackleman at The Pit in San Luis Obispo, and made his debut in 2001. In 2003 he entered and won a one-night tournament at Extreme Challenge 50. Kennedy only fought once in 2006. He then fought for the now defunct International Fight League in 2007, and did not fight in 2008 due to Army deployments overseas. During this time he wrote a three part series of "Letters from a Foreign Land" that chronicled his time in combat.

=== Strikeforce ===
Kennedy returned to mixed martial arts in 2009 with a win over Nick Thompson at Strikeforce Challengers: Villasenor vs. Cyborg in Kent, Washington. He followed this up with an impressive win over Zak Cummings in the main event of ShoMMA 3.

Kennedy fought Trevor Prangley on June 16, 2010, at Strikeforce: Los Angeles. He won via Submission (Rear-Naked Choke) in the first round.

Since his move to Austin, Texas, Kennedy has trained at the Competitive Training Center and with BJJ black belt Phil Cardella at the Relson Gracie Jiu-Jitsu Austin Association. He received his black belt under Paulo Brandao and Royler Gracie at Gracie Humaita Austin.

Kennedy lost a 5-round decision to Ronaldo Souza for the vacant Strikeforce Middleweight Championship at Strikeforce: Houston on August 21, 2010. He was expected to face Jason Miller again on March 5, 2011, at Strikeforce 32. However, Miller was forced out of the bout with an injury and replaced by Melvin Manhoef. Kennedy won via submission in the first round. He returned in July 2011 to face Robbie Lawler at Strikeforce: Fedor vs. Henderson. He won the bout via unanimous decision. He faced Luke Rockhold on July 14, 2012, for the Strikeforce Middleweight championship at Strikeforce: Rockhold vs. Kennedy. He lost the fight via unanimous decision.

Kennedy was expected to face Trevor Smith on November 3, 2012, at Strikeforce: Cormier vs. Mir. However, the event was cancelled due to injuries to headliner Frank Mir, as well to co-headliner and middleweight champion Luke Rockhold. This bout eventually took place on January 12, 2013, at Strikeforce: Marquardt vs. Saffiedine. Kennedy won via submission in the third round.

=== Ultimate Fighting Championship ===
In January 2013, the Strikeforce organization was closed by its parent company Zuffa. A list of fighters scheduled to be brought over to the Ultimate Fighting Championship was released in mid-January and Kennedy was one of the fighters listed.

Kennedy faced Roger Gracie on July 6, 2013, at UFC 162, he defeated Gracie via unanimous decision after defending Gracie's submission attempts and standing up with Gracie, out striking him.

Kennedy was expected to face Lyoto Machida on November 6, 2013, at UFC Fight For The Troops 3. However, Machida was pulled from the bout in favor of a matchup with Mark Muñoz on October 26, 2013, at UFC Fight Night 30, after Muñoz's original opponent, Michael Bisping was forced out of their bout with an injury. Kennedy instead faced Rafael Natal in the event headliner. He won the fight via knockout in the first round. The win also earned him his first Knockout of the Night bonus award.

For his third fight with the promotion, Kennedy faced Michael Bisping on April 16, 2014, at The Ultimate Fighter Nations Finale. He won the fight via unanimous decision.

Kennedy faced Yoel Romero on September 27, 2014, at UFC 178. He lost the fight via a 'technical knockout' (TKO) in the third round. Kennedy nearly finished Romero in the final seconds of the second round after hooking his fingers in Romero's gloves but Romero was saved by the bell. Yoel Romero, his cornermen, the referee and the UFC cutman have all been criticized for their actions resulting in a 28-second delay after the scheduled start for the third round. Romero later responded to the controversy, stating that Kennedy illegally held his glove during the attack which prevented Romero from being able to block the punches that rocked him. Despite the loss, Kennedy earned a Fight of the Night bonus award.

After two years away from the sport, Kennedy was expected to face Rashad Evans on November 12, 2016, at UFC 205, the first UFC card at Madison Square Garden. However, on November 8, Evans was pulled from the fight after an undisclosed irregularity was found during his pre-fight medical exam. In turn, Kennedy was removed from the card as well. The bout was rescheduled to take place a month later at UFC 206. Once again, Evans was unable to obtain medical clearance to compete on the card and was pulled from the bout on November 21. Kennedy faced Kelvin Gastelum. He lost the fight via TKO in the third round.

On January 17, 2017, Kennedy released a social media statement announcing his retirement from MMA. In the post he admitted that he no longer desired to fight professionally and thanked those closest to him for their support. He also thanked the US Army, claiming that there was 'no greater moment' than his victory in the main event of UFC: Fight for the Troops 3.

In 2019, Kennedy was inducted into the International Sports Hall of Fame.

== Personal life ==
Kennedy is married and has four children.

Kennedy is a co-owner of Ranger Up, a military-based clothing company. He is also the owner and CEO of Sheepdog Response, a tactical training and self-defense company. He is a co-founder and board member of Save Our Allies, an organization aiming to rescue and help Americans and their allies in conflict regions around the world.

In 2021, Kennedy opened a charter school in Austin, Texas called Apogee Cedar Park. The school is built off the Acton Academy model which emphasizes student-led learning through Socratic discussion and real world projects. The school is currently open for preK through 6th grade, with plans to expand to middle school children and eventually high school.

== Film and television career ==
Kennedy's first major host role was part of the History Channel television series Hunting Hitler, which explores alternative theories about Adolf Hitler's death. He most recently hosted the show on Discovery Channel Hard to Kill, in which he attempted to explore a day in the life of the world's most dangerous occupations. He helped co-produce the TV documentary Warriors in 2014 and produced Not a War Story in 2017; he also produced and hosted Iron Dragon TV. He's made appearances on Deadliest Warrior and The Ultimate Soldier Challenge.

Kennedy portrayed himself in the Indie film Range 15. He also played Mario and was a producer in the short thriller Slaves. He's also done several military advisor roles and stunt coordinator positions notably with Range 15 as well as works on Steve-O: Guilty as Charged, and short film Next to You.

== Military record investigation ==
In July 2025, Kennedy came under investigation after admitting he had misrepresented his military record, specifically by implying he received a Bronze Star with Valor he was never awarded.

On July 9, 2025, Kennedy acknowledged that he had "directly or indirectly" suggested he earned the valor distinction, stating: "That is not true, and there is no excuse for it." He clarified that while he did receive a Bronze Star, it was for meritorious service rather than combat valor.

Following his admission, the Maryland National Guard and the Pentagon confirmed that a formal investigation had been launched, announced on July 10, 2025. Officials emphasized that integrity is a core value of the military and that any misrepresentation of awards is taken seriously. Potential consequences could include disciplinary action or the loss of Kennedy's Special Forces tab.

On July 11, 2025, Yahoo! Sports reported that Kennedy's case had drawn significant attention not only for his personal misstatement but also for what it represented within the broader veteran community. Kennedy, who has built a large public profile as a military advocate, entrepreneur, and media personality, was highlighted as part of the "Vet Bro" influencer culture—veterans who leverage their service into public credibility and commercial ventures.

Kennedy has publicly apologized and accepted responsibility for the misrepresentation, though critics argue that even minor exaggerations of service records can undermine trust, particularly when amplified through large online followings and connections to government recruitment campaigns. As of mid-July 2025, the investigation remained ongoing and his standing within the Special Forces community was uncertain.

== Business controversy ==
In October 2025, an article titled "The Green Beret Who Couldn't Shoot Straight" was published by Texas Monthly. The article's author, Michael Sierra-Arevalo, referenced two lawsuits against Tim himself and one of his many businesses, Apogee Cedar Park. Furthermore, it references former Director of National Intelligence, Tulsi Gabbard, as a mentor for Mr Kennedy's Apogee Strong program. After a request was submitted to Apogee Strong, DNI Gabbard's name was removed. The same article also highlights connections between Apogee Strong and a far-right activist Jack Donovan.

== Military awards ==
Kennedy's awards include:

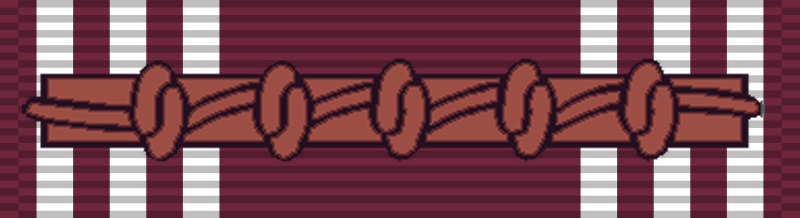

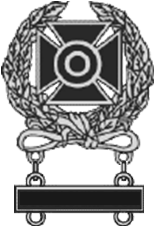

Badge	Combat Infantryman Badge		
1st row	Bronze Star Medal	Meritorious Service Medal	Army Commendation Medal w/ 1 bronze Oak leaf cluster
2nd row	Army Achievement Medal	Army Good Conduct Medal w/ bronze clasp and 5 loops (5 awards)	Army Reserve Components Achievement Medal
3rd row	National Defense Service Medal	Afghanistan Campaign Medal w/ 1 Campaign star	Iraq Campaign Medal w/ 1 Campaign star
4th row	Global War on Terrorism Expeditionary Medal	Global War on Terrorism Service Medal	NCO Professional Development Ribbon w/ award numeral 2
5th row	Army Service Ribbon	NATO Medal for ex-Yugoslavia	NATO Medal for service w/ ISAF
Badges	United States Army Special Forces; Distinctive unit insignia	Parachutist Badge	Expert Marksmanship badge with rifle component bar
Tabs	Special Forces Tab		Ranger Tab
Badge	United States Army Special Forces; Combat Service Identification Badge		

== Championships and accomplishments ==
- Extreme Challenge
  - Extreme Challenge Middleweight Tournament winner
- Ultimate Fighting Championship
  - Fight of the Night (One time)
  - Knockout of the Night (One time)
  - UFC.com Awards
    - 2013: Ranked#7 Import of the Year
- Black Belt magazine
  - 2011 MMA Fighter of the Year
- International Sports Hall of Fame
  - Class of 2019

== Mixed martial arts record ==
Professional record breakdown
24 matches	18 wins	6 losses
By knockout	8	3
By submission	6	0
By decision	4	3

Res.	Record	Opponent	Method	Event	Date	Round	Time	Location	Notes
Loss	18–6	Kelvin Gastelum	TKO (punches)	UFC 206	December 10, 2016	3	2:45	Toronto, Ontario, Canada	
Loss	18–5	Yoel Romero	TKO (punches)	UFC 178	September 27, 2014	3	0:58	Las Vegas, Nevada, United States	Fight of the Night
Win	18–4	Michael Bisping	Decision (unanimous)	The Ultimate Fighter Nations Finale: Bisping vs. Kennedy	April 16, 2014	5	5:00	Quebec City, Quebec, Canada	
Win	17–4	Rafael Natal	KO (punches)	UFC: Fight for the Troops 3	November 6, 2013	1	4:40	Fort Campbell, Kentucky, United States	Knockout of the Night
Win	16–4	Roger Gracie	Decision (unanimous)	UFC 162	July 6, 2013	3	5:00	Las Vegas, Nevada, United States	
Win	15–4	Trevor Smith	Submission (guillotine choke)	Strikeforce: Marquardt vs. Saffiedine	January 12, 2013	3	1:36	Oklahoma City, Oklahoma, United States	
Loss	14–4	Luke Rockhold	Decision (unanimous)	Strikeforce: Rockhold vs. Kennedy	July 14, 2012	5	5:00	Portland, Oregon, United States	For the Strikeforce Middleweight Championship
Win	14–3	Robbie Lawler	Decision (unanimous)	Strikeforce: Fedor vs. Henderson	July 30, 2011	3	5:00	Hoffman Estates, Illinois, United States	
Win	13–3	Melvin Manhoef	Submission (rear-naked choke)	Strikeforce: Feijao vs. Henderson	March 5, 2011	1	3:41	Columbus, Ohio, United States	
Loss	12–3	Ronaldo Souza	Decision (unanimous)	Strikeforce: Houston	August 21, 2010	5	5:00	Houston, Texas, United States	For the vacant Strikeforce Middleweight Championship
Win	12–2	Trevor Prangley	Submission (rear-naked choke)	Strikeforce: Los Angeles	June 16, 2010	1	3:35	Los Angeles, California, United States	
Win	11–2	Zak Cummings	Submission (North-South choke)	Strikeforce Challengers: Kennedy vs. Cummings	September 25, 2009	2	2:43	Bixby, Oklahoma, United States	
Win	10–2	Nick Thompson	TKO (submission to punches)	Strikeforce Challengers: Villasenor vs. Cyborg	June 19, 2009	2	2:37	Kent, Washington, United States	
Win	9–2	Elias Rivera	KO (punches)	IFL: World Grand Prix Finals	December 29, 2007	1	2:00	Uncasville, Connecticut, United States	
Loss	8–2	Jason Miller	Decision (unanimous)	HDNetFIGHTS: Reckless Abandon	December 15, 2007	3	5:00	Dallas, Texas, United States	
Win	8–1	Ryan McGivern	Submission (guillotine choke)	IFL: Chicago	June 19, 2007	2	1:25	Chicago, Illinois, United States	
Win	7–1	Dante Rivera	TKO (submission to punches)	IFL: Atlanta	February 23, 2007	2	2:29	Atlanta, Georgia, United States	Light Heavyweight bout
Win	6–1	Héctor Urbina	KO (punches)	Fight Fest 7	September 23, 2006	1	1:28	Cleveland, Ohio, United States	
Win	5–1	Cruz Chacon	TKO (punches)	Extreme Challenge 50	February 23, 2003	2	1:21	Salt Lake City, Utah, United States	Won the Extreme Challenge Middleweight Tournament
Win	4–1	Jason Miller	Decision (unanimous)	Extreme Challenge 50	February 23, 2003	3	5:00	Salt Lake City, Utah, United States	
Win	3–1	Ryan Narte	TKO (punches)	Extreme Challenge 50	February 23, 2003	1	1:22	Salt Lake City, Utah, United States	Return to Middleweight
Win	2–1	Mack Brewer	TKO (punches)	WEC 5: Halloween Havoc	October 18, 2002	1	1:03	Lemoore, California, United States	Light Heavyweight debut
Win	1–1	Jody Burke	Submission (forearm choke)	IFC: Warriors Challenge 16	November 9, 2001	1	0:44	Oroville, California, United States	Welterweight debut
Loss	0–1	Scott Smith	TKO (doctor stoppage)	IFC: Warriors Challenge 15	August 31, 2001	1	2:53	Oroville, California, United States	

== Books published ==
Kennedy, T., & Palmisciano, N. (2022) (Super Fiction) Scars and Stripes: An Unapologetically American Story of Fighting the Taliban, UFC Warriors, and Myself. Atria Books.

== See also ==
- List of Strikeforce alumni
- List of male mixed martial artists
