= EliteXC: A Night of Champions =

Elite Xtreme Combat MMA event in 2008

- The poster for EliteXC: A Night of Champions
- Promotion: EliteXC
- Date: November 8, 2008
- Venue: Reno Events Center
- City: Reno, Nevada

Event chronology
EliteXC: Heat	EliteXC: A Night of Champions

Prior to the closure of parent company ProElite on October 20, 2008, EliteXC: A Night of Champions was to be a mixed martial arts event held by EliteXC that would have taken place on November 8, 2008 in Reno, Nevada at the Reno Events Center. The event was scheduled to include two title fights and would have aired on the Showtime cable network.

== Background ==
The main event was set to feature the then EliteXC middleweight champion Robbie Lawler as he defended his belt against former King of the Cage middleweight champion Joey Villasenor. This fight was going to be a rematch from PRIDE 32 in which Lawler won by KO.

The second scheduled title fight featured top-ranked fighter Eddie Alvarez vs. contender Nick Diaz for the then-vacant EliteXC lightweight title. This title had been stripped from former champion K. J. Noons for failing to defend.

Also on the card was to be the return of former WEC light heavyweight champion Scott Smith vs. Cage Fighting Championship (CFC) middleweight champion Hector Lombard.

It was reported by MMA Junkie that Cyrille Diabate was offered a fight with Rafael Cavalcante for the vacant Light Heavyweight belt, but declined stating he did not have enough time to prepare.

== Announced matchups ==
=== Main card ===
Main Card
Weight class				Method	Round	Time	Notes
Middleweight Championship	Robbie Lawler	vs.	Joey Villasenor
Lightweight Championship	Eddie Alvarez	vs.	Nick Diaz
Middleweight	Scott Smith	vs.	Hector Lombard
Heavyweight	Brett Rogers	vs.	Paul Buentello
Exhibition bout	Igor Fadeev	vs.	Amar Kurpejovic
Exhibition bout	Mert Turhan	vs.	Marvin Ricardo Firat

== See also ==
- Elite Xtreme Combat
- 2008 in Elite Xtreme Combat
