= EliteXC: Heat =

Elite Xtreme Combat MMA event in 2008

- The poster for EliteXC: Heat
- Promotion: EliteXC
- Date: October 4, 2008
- Venue: BankAtlantic Center
- City: Sunrise, Florida
- Attendance: 9,414 (7,723 paid)
- Total gate: $826,433

Event chronology
EliteXC: Unfinished Business	EliteXC: Heat	EliteXC: A Night of Champions

EliteXC: Heat was a mixed martial arts event held by Elite Xtreme Combat (commonly known as EliteXC) on October 4, 2008, in Sunrise, Florida, at the BankAtlantic Center. The event was scheduled to be headlined with a heavyweight fight between Ken Shamrock and Kimbo Slice, but Shamrock had to pull out due to an injury and Seth Petruzelli was called up to replace him. Petruzelli delivered a shock win by knocking out Slice, but the fight was overshadowed by accusations that Petruzelli had been offered a payment by EliteXC's promoters to not fight Slice on the ground. The event also featured a heavyweight match between Andrei Arlovski and Roy Nelson in a cross-promotional event, and drew an estimated 4,560,000 viewers on CBS.

== Background ==
EliteXC: Heat was the third and final EliteXC show to be featured on CBS and marked the return of fighters Jake Shields, Gina Carano, and Kimbo Slice.

The main event was originally scheduled to be between Slice and Ken Shamrock. Shamrock took the fight after seeing Slice's previous fight against James Thompson. The EliteXC vice-president, Jared Shaw, wanted Slice to fight Brett Rogers but agreed to the fight with Shamrock, as a fight with Shamrock could have potentially raised television ratings. On the day of the event, Shamrock was practicing Brazilian Ju-Jiusu moves with his nutritionist but received a cut above his eye from an accidental headbutt. Although Shamrock was stitched up, the CBS network executives refused to let him fight. Shamrock's brother Frank, who was there as a commentator for CBS, offered himself as a replacement and showed paperwork that he was still registered as a fighter with the California State Athletic Commission, and would even throw the match for Slice. However, Slice rejected the change. Seth Petruzelli was moved up from a match on the undercard to replace Shamrock in the main event, something that Slice demanded a cash advance for in order to accept the change of opponent.

The show also included a co-promoted heavyweight bout with Affliction Entertainment, which featured former UFC Heavyweight Champion Andrei Arlovski facing the last and only reigning IFL Heavyweight Champion Roy Nelson. Arlovski and Nelson were loaned to EliteXC for the fight by Affliction Entertainment. Their fight was added to the card 10 days before the event, and other fights were not dropped from the card to make way for it. Shaw said that he wanted the event to be the catalyst for EliteXC to become a mainstream MMA company. The fight between Shields and Daley was also added despite suggestions that Shields would defend his EliteXC Welterweight title against Affliction's Matt Lindland. Shaw stated that this was speculation and the proposal had not been put to him by any side and he was only focussed on confirming Shields and Daley. A women's featherweight fight between Carano and Kelly Kobald was also arranged.

== Pre-fight ==
During their pre-fight weigh-ins, Shields and Daley got involved in a fight. Shields' coach Cesar Gracie claimed it started with Daley trash talking. For the women's featherweight bout, both fighters missed the 140 pound weight limit: Kobald weighed in at 141 pounds, and Carano at 142.75. In response, Carano stripped naked and tried again but she still missed weight at 142.5 pounds; she was allowed a third attempt due to an error with the scales and weighed in at 141 pounds. Accordingly, EliteXC refused to release footage of the weigh-ins. During Shamrock and Slice's weigh-in, Slice turned to leave when Shamrock shoved him in the back. Both fighters brawled for a few minutes with Shamrock constantly telling Slice "Don’t turn your back on me."

== Results ==
Main card (CBS)
Weight class				Method	Round	Time	Notes
Heavyweight	Seth Petruzelli	def.	Kimbo Slice	TKO (punches)	1	0:14
Welterweight	Jake Shields (c)	def.	Paul Daley	Submission (armbar)	2	3:47	(Note: For the EliteXC Welterweight Championship)
Heavyweight	Andrei Arlovski	def.	Roy Nelson	KO (punch)	2	3:14
Women's Featherweight	Gina Carano	def.	Kelly Kobold	Decision (unanimous) (30–27, 30–27, 29–28)	3	5:00
Middleweight	Benji Radach	def.	Murilo Rua	KO (punch)	2	2:31
Preliminary card (Unaired)
Women's Featherweight	Cris Cyborg	def.	Yoko Takahashi	Decision (unanimous) (30–26, 30–27, 30–27)	3	5:00
Lightweight	Conor Heun	def.	James Edson Berto	TKO (strikes)	2	2:18
Welterweight	Mikey Gomez	def.	Lorenzo Borgomeo	Submission (armbar)	2	4:06
Bantamweight	Bryan Hamade	def.	David Gomez	Submission (guillotine choke)	1	2:03
Lightweight	Nicolae Cury	def.	Jorge Bouchat	Submission (triangle choke)	1	1:35

== Aftermath ==
After the event, Petruzelli claimed that he was asked by the promoters to not take Slice to the ground and stay standing in exchange for money. The rationale was that Slice was stronger on his feet, though Petruzelli later claimed his words had been misconstrued and that he was just looking for a "Knockout of the Night" bonus. Dana White, the promoter of the rival Ultimate Fighting Championship, called it fight tampering and said "That's fucking illegal."

The Florida Department of Business and Professional Regulation opened an investigation into EliteXC as a result of the allegations, though it resisted White's call for the FBI to get involved and opening a criminal investigation. The preliminary investigation was assisted by the Florida State Boxing Commission to determine if there was a violation of F.S. 548.058 relating to sham or collusive contests. The investigation found insufficient evidence to proceed for a full investigation.

EliteXC was viewed as having set its brand around Slice. His quick loss was viewed to have damaged its product. At the time, the company was losing $55 million. The Slice incident led to Showtime Networks, who were looking to purchase a majority stake in the company, pulling out of negotiations. As a result, EliteXC folded on 21 October 2008.

During the first round of the Arlovski–Nelson fight, Nelson attained side-control and attempted a kimura lock on Arlovski. However, after 39 seconds on the ground, the referee ordered both fighters to stand up. The referee received criticism for the move, with MMA commentators stating they felt he acted too quickly and alleged it to be part of EliteXC's preference for stand-up fighting. The referee later explained that he did it because he felt that Nelson was not being active enough in trying to advance position or go for a submission.

== Salaries ==
EliteXC: Heat disclosed a fighter payroll totalling $1,318,000. Arlovski and Nelson's payouts were paid by Affliction instead of EliteXC.

- Seth Petruzelli ($50,000) def. Kimbo Slice ($500,000)
- Jake Shields ($50,000) def. Paul Daley ($12,000)
- Andrei Arlovski ($500,000) def. Roy Nelson ($80,000)
- Gina Carano ($25,000) def. Kelly Kobold ($6,000)
- Benji Radach ($30,000) def. Murilo Rua ($35,000)
- Cris Cyborg ($8,000) def. Yoko Takahashi ($2,000)
- Conor Heun ($5,000) def. Edson Berto ($5,000)
- Mikey Gomez ($4,000) def. Lorenzo Borgomeo ($1,500)
- Nicolae Curry ($1,500) def. Jorge Boechat ($1,000)
- Bryan Hamade ($1,000) def. David Gomez ($1,000)

== See also ==
- Elite Xtreme Combat
- 2008 in Elite Xtreme Combat
