= Strikeforce: Los Angeles =

Strikeforce mixed martial arts event in 2010

- The poster for Strikeforce: Los Angeles
- Promotion: Strikeforce
- Date: June 16, 2010
- Venue: Nokia Theatre
- City: Los Angeles, California, United States
- Attendance: 5,259
- Total gate: $418,000

Event chronology
Strikeforce: Heavy Artillery	Strikeforce: Los Angeles	Strikeforce: Fedor vs. Werdum

Strikeforce: Los Angeles, was a mixed martial arts event held by Strikeforce. The event took place on June 16, 2010, at Nokia Theatre in Los Angeles, California.

== Background ==
The card took place on a Wednesday and coincided with the 2010 Electronic Entertainment Expo (E3).

According to Strikeforce CEO Scott Coker, “The June 16 card will include some top-heavy main-event fighters, as well as some standout ‘Challenger’ prospects.”

Jason Miller was targeted as Robbie Lawler's opponent for this event. However, Strikeforce officials believe the Tennessee Athletic Commission will have Miller suspended, so Renato Sobral ended up being Lawler's opponent in a 195-lb Catchweight bout.

Bobby Lashley was set to face Ron Sparks on this card, however, Lashley dropped out after injuring his knee in training.

Charles Bennett was set to have a rematch against K. J. Noons but Bennett was forced to pull out for an undisclosed reason. He was replaced by Conor Heun.

Strikeforce CEO Scott Coker confirmed in an interview on June 9, 2010, that the winner of the Robbie Lawler vs. Renato Sobral fight would get a title shot in their respective division. Sobral would fight Muhammed Lawal, or Lawler would fight Jake Shields, though he was later replaced by Ronaldo Souza in the proposed matchup after Shields signed with the UFC. After winning the fight, Sobral announced that he wouldn't fight Lawal due to their friendship, and instead challenged Dan Henderson, who would defeat Sobral at Strikeforce: St. Louis on December 4, 2010, by TKO. The light heavyweight title shot would instead go to Rafael Cavalcante, who beat Lawal by TKO for the title at Strikeforce: Houston on August 21, 2010.

Strikeforce Challengers announcers Stephen Quadros and Pat Miletich handled commentary duties alongside Mauro Ranallo for this event, in lieu of the absent Gus Johnson & Frank Shamrock.

The event drew an estimated 164,000 viewers, with a peak at 197,000 on Showtime.

== Results ==
Main card
Weight class				Method	Round	Time	Notes
Catchweight (195 lb)	Renato Sobral	def.	Robbie Lawler	Decision (unanimous) (29–28, 29–28, 29–28)	3	5:00
Welterweight	Evangelista Santos	def.	Marius Žaromskis	TKO (head kick and punches)	1	2:38
Middleweight	Tim Kennedy	def.	Trevor Prangley	Submission (rear-naked choke)	1	3:35
Preliminary card
Catchweight (160 lb)	K. J. Noons	def.	Conor Heun	Decision (split) (27–30, 29–28, 29–28)	3	5:00
Bantamweight	Hugo Sandoval	def.	Marcus Kowal	TKO (strikes)	2	0:43
Catchweight (160 lb)	Jeremy Umphries	def.	R.J. Clifford	Technical submission (rear-naked choke)	2	2:27

== Reported payout ==
The following is a list of fighter salaries as provided by the California State Athletic Commission. The figures do not include deductions for items such as insurance, licenses and taxes. Additionally, the figures do not include money paid by sponsors, which can often be a substantial portion of a fighter's income.

- Renato "Babalu" Sobral: $100,000 (no win bonus) def. Robbie Lawler: $85,000
- Evangelista "Cyborg" Santos: $10,000 (no win bonus) def. Marius Zaramoskis: $5,000
- Tim Kennedy: $30,000 (no win bonus) def. Trevor Prangley: $30,000
- K. J. Noons: $25,000 (no win bonus) def. Conor Heun: $4,000
- Jeremy Umphries: $1,500 (no win bonus) def. R.J. Clifford: $2,000
- Hugo Sandoval: $1,500 (no win bonus) def. Marcus Kowal: $1,000

== See also ==
- Strikeforce (mixed martial arts)
- List of Strikeforce champions
- List of Strikeforce events
- 2010 in Strikeforce
