= Steve Berger =

American mixed martial arts fighter

- Born: Stephen Richard Berger; May 20, 1973 (age 53); St. Louis, Missouri, United States
- Other names: The Red Nose Pitbull
- Nationality: American
- Height: 5 ft 11 in (1.80 m)
- Weight: 170 lb (77 kg; 12 st)
- Division: Middleweight; Welterweight; Lightweight
- Stance: Southpaw
- Team: Red Nose MMA
- Years active: 1998–2012

Mixed martial arts record
- Total: 47
- Wins: 20
- By knockout: 2
- By submission: 14
- By decision: 4
- Losses: 23
- By knockout: 8
- By submission: 1
- By decision: 14
- Draws: 2
- No contests: 2

Other information
- Mixed martial arts record from Sherdog

Stephen Richard Berger (born May 20, 1973) is an American retired professional mixed martial artist who competed in the Welterweight division. Berger is probably best known for fighting in the UFC, most notably participating in the first mixed martial arts fight aired on US cable television against Robbie Lawler at UFC 37.5.

== Background ==
Berger was born and raised in St. Louis, Missouri. According to him, he had serious anxiety that he tried to relieve by getting into fights in his youth. Berger wrestled in high school, and started boxing at the age of 17. After having boxing for a few years, Berger picked up judo and Brazilian jiu-jitsu as well.

== Personal life ==
Berger and his wife have a son.

== Mixed martial arts record ==
Professional record breakdown
47 matches	20 wins	23 losses
By knockout	2	8
By submission	14	1
By decision	4	14
Draws	2	
No contests	2	

Res.	Record	Opponent	Method	Event	Date	Round	Time	Location	Notes
Loss	20–23–2 (2)	Scott Cleve	Submission (guillotine choke)	CC 37 - Cage Championships 37	April 7, 2012	1	1:02	Washington, Missouri, United States	
Loss	20–22–2 (2)	Chris Tickle	TKO (punches)	PCL - Cage Madness	March 26, 2011	2	0:56	Glen Carbon, Illinois, United States	
Loss	20–21–2 (2)	Ferrid Kheder	TKO (punches)	Mixed Fight League 3	September 25, 2010	2	1:26	Montreal, Quebec, Canada	Catchweight (175 lb) bout.
Win	20–20–2 (2)	Sal Woods	Submission (guillotine choke)	Premier Combat League 1: Bad Intentions	August 21, 2010	3	1:13	Glen Carbon, Illinois, United States	
Loss	19–20–2 (2)	Waylon Lowe	KO (punches)	KOTC: Bad Boys II	April 16, 2010	1	2:18	Detroit, Michigan, United States	
Win	19–19–2 (2)	Ryan Scheeper	Submission (arm-triangle choke)	Take That Promotions: Warriors Collide	October 3, 2009	1	2:10	Glen Carbon, Illinois, United States	
Loss	18–19–2 (2)	Ray Steinbeiss	Decision (unanimous)	Evolution MMA	October 4, 2008	3	5:00	Phoenix, Arizona, United States	
Loss	18–18–2 (2)	Eddy Ellis	Decision (unanimous)	Strikeforce: At The Dome	February 23, 2008	3	5:00	Tacoma, Washington, United States	
Loss	18–17–2 (2)	Diego Gonzalez	Decision (unanimous)	Bodog Fight - Vancouver	August 24, 2007	3	5:00	British Columbia, Canada	
Win	18–16–2 (2)	Piotr Jakaczynski	Decision (split)	Bodog Fight - Costa Rica	February 16, 2007	3	5:00	Costa Rica	
Loss	17–16–2 (2)	Jorge Masvidal	Decision (unanimous)	Bodog Fight - St. Petersburg	December 15, 2006	3	5:00	St. Petersburg, Russia	
Loss	17–15–2 (2)	Jake Shields	TKO (punches)	FCP: Malice at Cow Palace	September 9, 2006	2	1:36	Cow Palace, San Francisco, CA.	
Loss	17–14–2 (2)	Victor Moreno	TKO (doctor stoppage)	Diesel Fighting Championships 1	June 30, 2006	1	3:00	Texas, United States	
Win	17–13–2 (2)	Mark Long	TKO (punches)	TFC 4: Memorial Mayhem	June 9, 2006	1	1:38	Kansas, United States	
Loss	16–13–2 (2)	Nuri Shakur	Decision (unanimous)	APEX: Undisputed	September 3, 2005	3	5:00	Montreal, Quebec, Canada	
Loss	16–12–2 (2)	Heath Sims	TKO (cut)	SF 9: Respect	March 26, 2005	3	1:23	Oregon, United States	
Loss	16–11–2 (2)	Keith Wisniewski	Decision (unanimous)	Combat - Do Fighting Challenge 1	October 23, 2004	3	5:00	Illinois, United States	
Win	16–10–2 (2)	Fritz Paul	TKO (submission to punches)	APEX: Genesis	September 5, 2004	1	4:46	Montreal, Quebec, Canada	Middleweight bout.
Loss	15–10–2 (2)	Phil Johns	Decision	RSF - Shooto Challenge 2	January 2, 2004	3	5:00	Illinois, United States	
Loss	15–9–2 (2)	Din Thomas	Decision (unanimous)	Absolute Fighting Championships 4	July 19, 2003	3	5:00	Florida, United States	
Win	15–8–2 (2)	Nuri Shakur	Submission (guillotine choke)	USMMA 2: Ring of Fury	September 21, 2002	1	4:59	Massachusetts, United States	Won the vacant USMAA Welterweight Championship.
Loss	14–8–2 (2)	Robbie Lawler	TKO (punches)	UFC 37.5	June 22, 2002	2	0:27	Nevada, United States	
NC	14–7–2 (2)	Benji Radach	No Contest (overturned by state commission)	UFC 37	May 10, 2002	1	0:27	Louisiana, United States	Radach was declared the winner by TKO at 0:27 of the first round, but the fight was later ruled a No Contest by the Louisiana State Athletic Commission due to Radach holding the fence.
Win	14–7–2 (1)	Pete Spratt	TKO (cut)	UA 1: The Genesis	January 27, 2002	1	2:14	Indiana, United States	
Loss	13–7–2 (1)	Chris Brennan	Decision (unanimous)	KOTC 11 - Domination	September 29, 2001	3	5:00	California, United States	For the KOTC Middleweight Championship.
Win	13–6–2 (1)	Seichi Ikemoto	Submission (triangle/armbar)	Shooto - To The Top 7	August 26, 2001	3	2:09	Osaka, Japan	
Loss	12–6–2 (1)	Tony DeSouza	Decision (unanimous)	UFC 31	May 4, 2001	3	5:00	New Jersey, United States	Return to Welterweight.
Win	12–5–2 (1)	Nick Cardenez	Submission (armbar)	TPA - Tom Proctor's Absolute	February 16, 2001	1	1:10	United States	
Loss	11–5–2 (1)	Karl Schmidt	TKO (cut)	Reality Submission Fighting 2	January 5, 2001	1	22:38	Belleville, Illinois, United States	Welterweight bout.
Win	11–4–2 (1)	Rich Clementi	Submission (armbar)	Dangerzone - Insane In Ft. Wayne	November 25, 2000	1	3:14	Fort Wayne, Indiana, United States	Lightweight debut.
Draw	10–4–2 (1)	Jutaro Nakao	Draw	HOOKnSHOOT: Fusion	November 18, 2000	3	5:00	Evansville, Indiana, United States	
Win	10–4–1 (1)	Riley McIlhon	Submission (armbar)	Reality Submission Fighting 1	October 6, 2000	1	1:12	Belleville, Illinois, United States	
Win	9–4–1 (1)	Shonie Carter	Submission (rear-naked choke)	Reality Submission Fighting 1	October 6, 2000	1	2:41	Belleville, Illinois, United States	
Win	8–4–1 (1)	Brian Geraghty	Submission (armbar)	Submission Fighting Championships 11	August 23, 2000	1	2:01	Collinsville, Illinois, United States	
Loss	7–4–1 (1)	Aaron Riley	Decision	HOOKnSHOOT: Triumph	August 19, 2000	3	5:00	Evansville, Indiana, United States	
Loss	7–3–1 (1)	Jason Black	Decision (split)	Extreme Challenge 32	May 21, 2000	1	15:00	Springfield, Illinois, United States	
Draw	7–2–1 (1)	Andy Sanders	Draw	HOOKnSHOOT - Double Fury 2	March 18, 2000	N/A		Evansville, Indiana, United States	
Win	7–2 (1)	Shannon Ritch	Submission (guillotine)	Submission Fighting Championships 9	January 28, 2000	1	1:30	Belleville, Illinois, United States	
Win	6–2 (1)	Jason Glabus	Decision	Ironheart Crown 1 - Genesis	November 6, 1999	2	2:00	Chicago, Illinois, United States	Won the Ironheart Crown 4-man tournament.
Win	5–2 (1)	Shonie Carter	Decision (split)	Ironheart Crown 1 - Genesis	November 6, 1999	2	2:00	Chicago, Illinois, United States	
Loss	4–2 (1)	Ben Harrison	Decision	HOOKnSHOOT: Beyond	September 10, 1999	1	15:00		
Win	4–1 (1)	James Wade	Submission (triangle choke)	Submission Fighting Championships 8	August 7, 1999	1		Belleville, Illinois, United States	
Loss	3–1 (1)	Jeremy Horn	Decision (unanimous)	Submission Fighting Championships 5	January 31, 1999	1	24:00	Belleville, Illinois, United States	
NC	3–0 (1)	Greg James	No Contest	UCC - Universal Challenge Championship	May 2, 1998	1	0:38		
Win	3–0	David Beason	Submission (front choke)	UCC - Universal Challenge Championship	May 2, 1998	1	8:58		
Win	2–0	James Wade	Decision	Submission Fighting Championships 2	April 28, 1998	N/A		Collinsville, Illinois, United States	
Win	1–0	Ryan McBride	Submission (armbar)	Submission Fighting Championships 1	January 15, 1998	N/A		Collinsville, Illinois, United States	
