= UFC 37.5 =

UFC mixed martial arts event in 2002

UFC 37.5: As Real As It Gets
- The poster for UFC 37.5: As Real As It Gets
- Promotion: Ultimate Fighting Championship
- Date: June 22, 2002
- Venue: Bellagio Hotel and Casino
- City: Las Vegas, Nevada
- Attendance: 3,700

Event chronology
UFC 37: High Impact	UFC 37.5: As Real As It Gets	UFC 38: Brawl at the Hall

UFC 37.5: As Real As It Gets was a mixed martial arts event held by the Ultimate Fighting Championship at the Bellagio Hotel and Casino in Las Vegas, Nevada on June 22, 2002.

== Background ==
The fight card was headlined by a bout between top contenders, returning Vitor Belfort, and Chuck Liddell. UFC 37.5 was the first UFC event to feature Joe Rogan as a color commentator (he had previously done backstage interviews) but he would leave again to host Fear Factor, and return at UFC 40. Joe made several UFC appearances prior to UFC 37.5 as the behind-the-scenes interviewer starting at UFC 12.

UFC 37.5 was a last-minute event specifically held to promote the UFC on Fox Sports Net's The Best Damn Sports Show Period, where the "best fight" of the night was to air during the BDSSP's "All Star Summer" celebration in June 2002. The fight aired was Steve Berger vs Robbie Lawler, which has the distinction of being the first mixed martial arts (MMA) fight to be aired on US cable television. It also aired in Free-to-Air television in Brazil for first time at SBT, Vitor Belfort had previously participated at the network's reality show Casa dos Artistas (The House of Artists).

The event featured only six fights, which is a much smaller card than others under the UFC banner at the time, and was not broadcast on Pay-per-view until August 16th. The number 37.5 was used because UFC 38 had already been announced and marketed in England, where the UFC was making their debut just three weeks later.

== Results ==
Main Card
Weight class				Method	Round	Time	Notes
Light Heavyweight	Chuck Liddell	def.	Vitor Belfort	Decision (unanimous) (30–27, 30–27, 29–28)	3	5:00
Welterweight	Benji Radach	def.	Nick Serra	Decision (unanimous) (29–28, 30–27, 30–27)	3	5:00
Welterweight	Pete Spratt	def.	Zach Light	Submission (armbar)	1	2:25
Welterweight	Robbie Lawler	def.	Steve Berger	TKO (punches)	2	0:27
Middleweight	Tony Fryklund	def.	Rodrigo Ruas	TKO (punches)	2	3:34
Lightweight	Yves Edwards	def.	Joao Marcos Pierini	TKO (injury)	1	1:19	(Note: Pierini injured his shoulder falling to the mat after a high kick from Edwards.)

== Encyclopedia awards ==
The following fighters were honored in the October 2011 book titled UFC Encyclopedia.

- Fight of the Night: Chuck Liddell vs. Vitor Belfort
- Knockout of the Night: Robbie Lawler
- Submission of the Night: Pete Spratt

== See also ==
- Ultimate Fighting Championship
- List of UFC champions
- List of UFC events
- 2002 in UFC
