= Benji Radach =

American mixed martial arts fighter (1979–2024)

- Born: Benji Russell Radach; April 5, 1979; Castle Rock, Washington, U.S.
- Died: August 2024 (aged 45)
- Other names: Razor
- Height: 6 ft 2 in (1.88 m)
- Weight: 186 lb (84 kg; 13.3 st)
- Division: Middleweight; Light heavyweight; Welterweight
- Fighting out of: Castle Rock, Washington, U.S.
- Team: Reign MMA
- Years active: 2001–2004, 2007–2010, 2015

Mixed martial arts record
- Total: 29
- Wins: 21
- By knockout: 17
- By submission: 1
- By decision: 3
- Losses: 7
- By knockout: 5
- By decision: 2
- No contests: 1

Other information
- Mixed martial arts record from Sherdog

Benji Russell Radach (April 5, 1979 – August 2024) was an American professional mixed martial artist who competed in the middleweight division of Bellator MMA. A professional competitor from 2001, Radach also competed for the UFC, the WEC, Strikeforce, and the Los Angeles Anacondas of the IFL.

== Mixed martial arts ==
=== Early career ===
Radach made his professional MMA debut in 2001 and compiled an undefeated record of 10-0 before being signed by the UFC to compete as a Welterweight.

=== Ultimate Fighting Championship ===
Radach made his UFC debut against Steve Berger at UFC 37 on May 10, 2002. Radach originally was declared the winner via TKO 27 seconds into the first round, but the decision was later overturned when replay showed that Radach had the fence in his hand as he finished the final blows that ended the fight via TKO.

Radach next fought against Nick Serra on June 22, 2002, at UFC 37.5. Radach won via unanimous decision.

Radach then made his next appearance against future UFC Lightweight Champion Sean Sherk at UFC 39 on September 27, 2002. Radach lost in the first round via TKO from a referee stoppage due to a cut.

=== Post-UFC ===
Radach returned to the regional circuit where he went 4-1 before facing former WEC Middleweight Champion Chris Leben under the SportFight 4 on June 26, 2004. Radach lost via TKO in the third round after breaking his jaw, and as a result, he was kept away from active competition for three years.

=== International Fight League ===
Radach returned to MMA in 2007 after signing a contract to compete for the Los Angeles Anacondas of the IFL, coached by Bas Rutten. He made his first appearance against Ryan McGivern on February 2, 2007, at IFL: Houston. Radach won via TKO in the second round.

Radach then faced Brian Foster at IFL: Los Angeles on March 17, 2007. Radach won via guillotine choke submission in the first round.

Radach then fought Bristol Marunde at IFL: Everett on June 1, 2007, and won via TKO in the first round.

Radach made his next appearance against Gerald Harris at the IFL 2007 semifinals on August 2, 2007. Radach won via TKO in the first round.

Radach next fought Brent Beauparlant at the IFL World Grand Prix Semifinals on November 3, 2007, and won via knockout in the first round.

Undefeated in the promotion, he next fought for the inaugural IFL Middleweight Championship against Matt Horwich at the IFL World Grand Prix Finals on December 29, 2007. Radach lost via knockout in the second round.

=== EliteXC ===
Radach signed a three-fight deal with EliteXC in 2008 and won his first bout against top-ranked middleweight Murilo Rua at EliteXC: Heat on October 4, 2008. He finished the fight via TKO in the second round.

=== Strikeforce ===
After EliteXC's demise, Radach then moved on to Strikeforce where he lost by a controversial knockout to Scott Smith. He was winning the fight striking until he was knocked out by a straight right from Smith in the final round.

Radach suffered many injuries throughout his career, including a broken jaw, a herniated disc, neck surgery, ACL replacement, and a broken collarbone, amongst others. Radach would suffer another problem in February 2010 when he caught a staph infection after surgery on a torn pectoral muscle that was suffered in training.

Radach fought Ovince St. Preux for Strikeforce on December 4, 2010. Radach lost to St. Preux via unanimous decision (30-27, 30-26, 30-25).

Radach was expected to return from a three-year hiatus and face Dmitry Samoilov at Tyumen Fight 2 on December 22, 2013. However, in the weeks leading up to the fight, the event was cancelled.

=== Bellator MMA ===
Over four years after his last fight, Radach made his Bellator debut against undefeated Ben Reiter at Bellator 137 on May 15, 2015, replacing an injured A.J. Matthews. He lost the fight by unanimous decision.

== Outside MMA ==
Radach worked as a chaser in the woods, logging, and also commercial fishing in Petersburg, Alaska and Bristol Bay, Alaska to pay for school and MMA training.

In 2006 Radach foiled an armed robbery attempt in Vancouver, Washington, by physically disarming a gunman who was trying to hold up the restaurant that Radach was patronizing.

In 2008, he was named the corporate director of instructor's training for LA Boxing. His responsibilities primarily involve training and preparing potential LA Boxing instructors for lessons of various experience levels.

On August 26, 2024, it was announced that Radach had died at the age of 45.

== Mixed martial arts record ==
Professional record breakdown
29 matches	21 wins	7 losses
By knockout	17	5
By submission	1	0
By decision	3	2
No contests	1	

Res.	Record	Opponent	Method	Event	Date	Round	Time	Location	Notes
Loss	21–7 (1)	Ben Reiter	Decision (unanimous)	Bellator 137	May 15, 2015	3	5:00	Temecula, California, United States	Return to Middleweight.
Loss	21–6 (1)	Ovince St. Preux	Decision (unanimous)	Strikeforce: Henderson vs. Babalu II	December 4, 2010	3	5:00	St. Louis, Missouri, United States	Light Heavyweight debut.
Loss	21–5 (1)	Scott Smith	KO (punch)	Strikeforce: Shamrock vs. Diaz	April 11, 2009	3	3:24	San Jose, California, United States	
Win	21–4 (1)	Murilo Rua	TKO (punches)	EliteXC: Heat	October 4, 2008	2	2:31	Sunrise, Florida, United States	
Loss	20–4 (1)	Matt Horwich	KO (punch)	IFL: World Grand Prix Finals	December 29, 2007	2	1:58	Uncasville, Connecticut, United States	For the inaugural IFL Middleweight Championship.
Win	20–3 (1)	Brent Beauparlant	KO (punch)	IFL: World Grand Prix Semifinals	November 3, 2007	1	2:26	Chicago, Illinois, United States	
Win	19–3 (1)	Gerald Harris	TKO (punches)	IFL: 2007 Semifinals	August 2, 2007	1	3:03	East Rutherford, New Jersey, United States	
Win	18–3 (1)	Bristol Marunde	TKO (punches)	IFL: Everett	June 1, 2007	1	1:28	Everett, Washington, United States	
Win	17–3 (1)	Brian Foster	Submission (guillotine choke)	IFL: Los Angeles	March 17, 2007	1	1:04	Los Angeles, California, United States	
Win	16–3 (1)	Ryan McGivern	TKO (punches)	IFL: Houston	February 2, 2007	2	2:22	Houston, Texas, United States	
Loss	15–3 (1)	Chris Leben	TKO (jaw injury)	SF 4: Fight For Freedom	June 26, 2004	3	3:43	Gresham, Oregon, United States	
Loss	15–2 (1)	Danny Lafever	KO (punch)	Ultimate Ring Challenge 6	October 25, 2003	1	0:55	Longview, Washington, United States	
Win	15–1 (1)	Gustavo Machado	KO (punches)	KOTC 28: More Punishment	August 16, 2003	1	1:31	Reno, Nevada, United States	
Win	14–1 (1)	Steve Van Fleet	KO (punches)	IFC WC 18: Big Valley Brawl	July 19, 2003	1	1:21	Lakeport, California, United States	
Win	13–1 (1)	Joel Blanton	KO (punches)	UFCF: Seattle	March 1, 2003	1	N/A	Seattle, Washington, United States	
Win	12–1 (1)	Chris Irvine	KO (punches)	Ultimate Ring Challenge 3	January 4, 2003	1	1:02	Kelso, Washington, United States	Return to Middleweight.
Loss	11–1 (1)	Sean Sherk	TKO (cut)	UFC 39	September 27, 2002	1	4:16	Uncasville, Connecticut, United States	
Win	11–0 (1)	Nick Serra	Decision (unanimous)	UFC 37.5	June 22, 2002	3	5:00	Las Vegas, Nevada, United States	
NC	10–0 (1)	Steve Berger	No Contest (overturned by state commission)	UFC 37	May 10, 2002	1	0:27	Bossier City, Louisiana, United States	Welterweight debut. Originally ruled a TKO (punches) win for Radach; overturned to a no contest by the Louisiana Athletic Commission due to Radach holding the fence.
Win	10–0	Shannon Ritch	TKO (punches)	MFC 3: Canadian Pride	March 3, 2002	1	1:18	Alberta, Canada	
Win	9–0	Eric Davila	Decision (unanimous)	Rumble in the Rockies	January 26, 2002	2	3:00	Denver, Colorado, United States	
Win	8–0	Oscar Verdusco	KO (punch)	UFCF: Olympia Ring Challenge	January 5, 2002	1	0:25	Olympia, Washington, United States	
Win	7–0	Willy Solorio	TKO (punches)	IFC: Warriors Challenge 16	November 9, 2001	1	1:23	Oroville, California, United States	
Win	6–0	Royden Demotta	TKO (punches and knees)	WEC 2	October 4, 2001	1	1:01	Lemoore, California, United States	
Win	5–0	Eric Perez	KO (punch)	PPKA: Muckelshoot	August 15, 2001	1	0:18	Auburn, Washington, United States	
Win	4–0	Dennis Asche	Decision (unanimous)	DesertBrawl 1	June 1, 2001	3	5:00	Bend, Oregon, United States	
Win	3–0	Oz Preciado	KO (punch)	UFCF: Everett Extreme Challenge 3	May 19, 2001	1	N/A	Everett, Washington, United States	
Win	2–0	Eric Lucas	KO (punch)	Rumble in the Ring 2	April 28, 2001	1	0:09	Auburn, Washington, United States	
Win	1–0	Clayton Purvis	TKO (punches)	UFCF: Road To Victory	March 17, 2001	3	N/A	Olympia, Washington, United States	
