= UFC 37 =

UFC mixed martial arts event in 2002

UFC 37: High Impact
- The poster for UFC 37: High Impact
- Promotion: Ultimate Fighting Championship
- Date: May 10, 2002
- Venue: CenturyTel Center
- City: Bossier City, Louisiana
- Attendance: 7,200
- Buyrate: 50,000

Event chronology
UFC 36: Worlds Collide	UFC 37: High Impact	UFC 37.5: As Real As It Gets

UFC 37: High Impact was a mixed martial arts event held by the Ultimate Fighting Championship at the CenturyTel Center in Bossier City, Louisiana on May 10, 2002. The event was seen live on pay per view in the United States, and was later released on home video.

== History ==
The card was headlined by a Middleweight Title Bout between Murilo Bustamante and Matt Lindland. It featured the first UFC appearances of Robbie Lawler and Ivan Salaverry.

The fight between Bustamante and Lindland has led to the contest being known as the infamous "double tap" fight. Bustamante had Lindland hooked cleanly in an armbar early in the fight, then released it after what seemed to be a tap, followed by a shout to stop the action by John McCarthy. Lindland claimed it wasn't a tap, which controversially led McCarthy to restart the fight. Many thought that this was a mistake by McCarthy to stop the fight considering it was probably the only way for Lindland to escape the armbar.

Bustamante was stripped of the title on October 5, 2002 after signing with PRIDE, thereby vacating the UFC Middleweight Championship belt.

== Results ==
Main Card
Weight class				Method	Round	Time	Notes
Middleweight	Murilo Bustamante (c)	def.	Matt Lindland	Submission (guillotine choke)	3	1:33	(Note: For the UFC Middleweight Championship. Bustamante had Lindland in an armbar early in the fight, then released it after what seemed to be a tap, followed by a shout to stop the action by John McCarthy. Lindland claimed it wasn't a tap, which controversially led McCarthy to restart the fight. This has led to the contest being known as the infamous "double tap" fight.)
Heavyweight	Ricco Rodriguez	def.	Tsuyoshi Kosaka	TKO (punches)	2	3:25
Lightweight	B.J. Penn	def.	Paul Creighton	TKO (punches)	2	3:23
Middleweight	Phil Baroni	def.	Amar Suloev	TKO (punches)	1	2:55
Lightweight	Caol Uno	def.	Yves Edwards	Decision (unanimous) (29–28, 30–29, 29–28)	3	5:00
Preliminary card
Middleweight	Ivan Salaverry	def.	Andrei Semenov	TKO (punches)	3	2:27
Welterweight	Benji Radach	vs.	Steve Berger	NC (overturned by state commission)	1	0:27	(Note: Radach was declared the winner by TKO at 0:27 of the first round, but the fight was later ruled a No Contest by the Louisiana State Athletic Commission due to Radach holding the fence.)
Welterweight	Robbie Lawler	def.	Aaron Riley	Decision (unanimous) (29–28, 29–27, 29–27)	3	5:00

== Encyclopedia awards ==
The following fighters were honored in the October 2011 book titled UFC Encyclopedia.

- Fight of the Night: Robbie Lawler vs. Aaron Riley
- Knockout of the Night: Ricco Rodriguez
- Submission of the Night: Murilo Bustamante

== See also ==
- Ultimate Fighting Championship
- List of UFC champions
- List of UFC events
- 2002 in UFC
