= Jason Miller (fighter) =

American mixed martial arts fighter

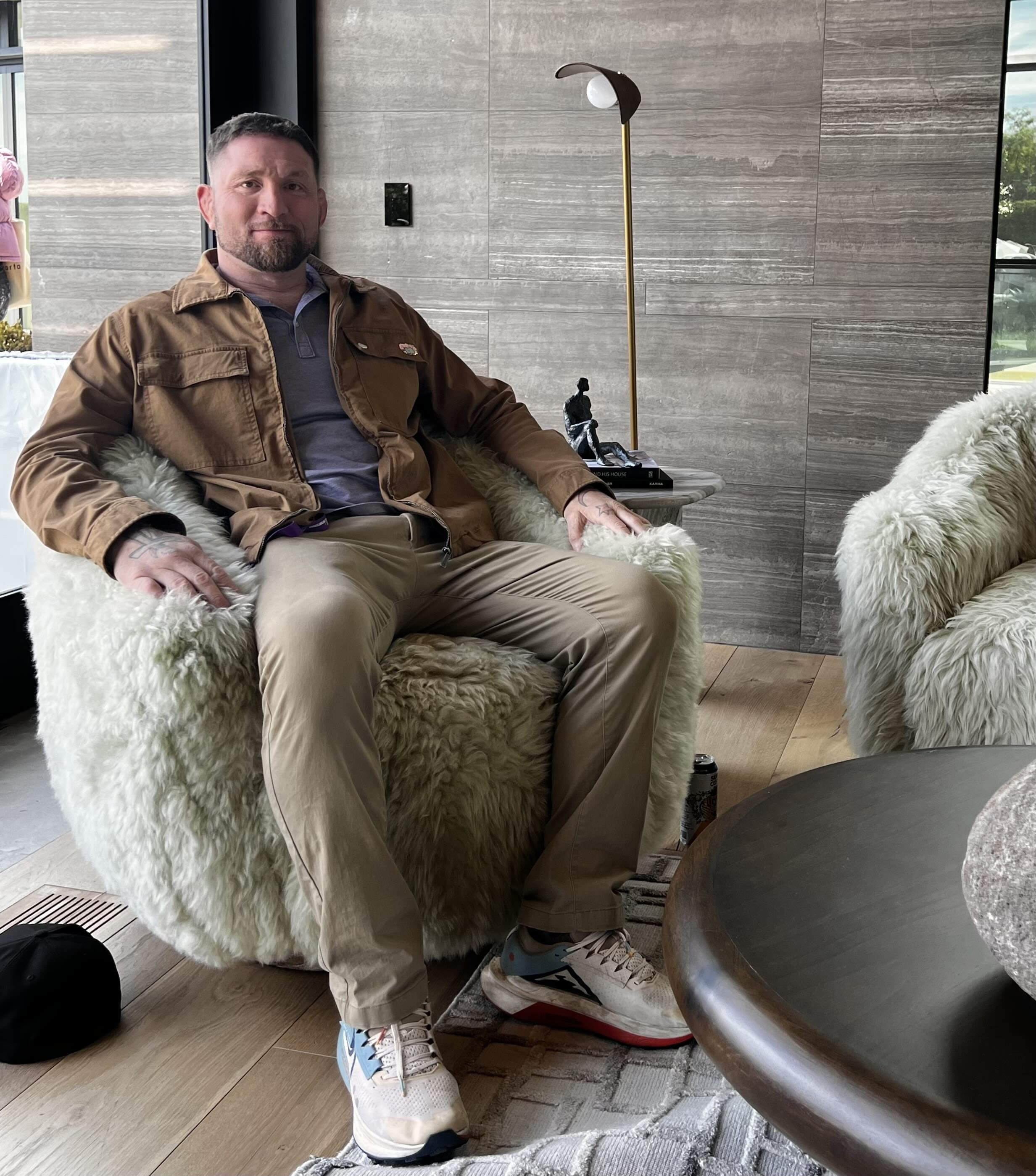
- Jason "Mayhem" Miller in 2024
- Born: December 24, 1980 (age 45); Fayetteville, North Carolina, U.S.
- Other names: Mayhem
- Height: 6 ft 0 in (183 cm)
- Weight: 185 lb (84 kg; 13 st 3 lb)
- Division: Welterweight (2004–2005); Middleweight (2001–2004, 2005, 2007–2012); Light Heavyweight (2006, 2016); Heavyweight (2006)
- Reach: 76 in (193 cm)
- Stance: Orthodox
- Fighting out of: Los Angeles, California, U.S.
- Team: Team Punishment; Kings MMA; Mayhem Miller Industries
- Rank: Black belt in Brazilian Jiu-Jitsu; Yellow belt in Taekwondo
- Years active: 1997–2012, 2016

Mixed martial arts record
- Total: 34
- Wins: 23
- By knockout: 5
- By submission: 14
- By decision: 4
- Losses: 10
- By knockout: 2
- By submission: 2
- By decision: 6
- No contests: 1

Other information
- Website: https://mayhemnow.com/
- Mixed martial arts record from Sherdog
- Last updated on: June 9, 2012

Jason Miller (born December 24, 1980), best known as Mayhem Miller, is an American podcaster, mixed martial artist, coach, actor, and television host. Formerly “Mayhem the Newsman,” on the Adam Carolla Show. Currently, special guest host on "Love & War with Dominick Cruz." He previously trained with Kings MMA in Huntington Beach, California, and continues to train and coach fighters at several gyms in Los Angeles, California, including Fight Science and Forj Boxing and Fitness. He travels across the country to lead mixed martial arts seminars focusing on teaching techniques, as well as mental health and recovery awareness.

Miller was a top ranked Middleweight MMA fighter who fought in the UFC, Strikeforce, WFA, WEC and DREAM.

He was the host of MTV's Bully Beatdown, a worldwide syndicated reality competition show created by Mark Burnett. In each episode, Jason "Mayhem" Miller challenged bullies to fight against a professional mixed martial artist for cash prizes.

Miller is an ambassador for Merging Vets and Players, an organization that empowers combat veterans and former professional athletes by creating a community and providing services to assist with transition and promote personal development after their service is complete.

== Early life ==
Jason Miller was born in an army hospital on Christmas Eve, 1980. Both parents were in the military and spent most of his youth moving around the United States, residing on Army bases' government housing- the longest on Fort Bragg, North Carolina. Miller developed an interest in combat sports at an early age and trained in traditional martial arts for periods as a child. His father was a paratrooper in the United States Army's 82nd Airborne Division and a former amateur boxer. Miller has attributed a lot of his fighting experience in interviews to neighborhood street fights and brawls with his father.

In high school, he was on the wrestling team and trained in judo, and became interested in mixed martial arts after watching video tapes of the Ultimate Fighting Championship, Pride, and Vale Tudo Brazil, and joined a mixed martial arts gym at the age of 16. [6] He made his mixed martial arts debut at the age of 17, forgoing his senior prom, to fight 27-year-old Al "Superman" Dill in a Virginia Beach event. Miller won by unanimous decision and embarked on a career in professional mixed martial arts.

== Mixed martial arts career ==
On October 16, 2004, Miller won his first Superbrawl Championship with a submission victory over Ronald Jhun. During the event, a riot broke out, and Miller was punched in the back of the head by fellow fighter Mark Moreno. This set the stage for a grudge match in which Miller defeated Moreno with an armbar in the first round. Miller made the shaka sign shortly before the finish.

On September 2, 2006, Miller won the Icon Sport Middleweight title from Robbie Lawler in a back and forth battle. After being staggered and nearly finished by Lawler, Mayhem secured an arm triangle choke and won via submission in the third round. In December of the same year, Mayhem lost his first title defense to Frank Trigg via TKO in the second round, a fight in which he was favored to win.

Miller stepped into the Dream 4 tournament on short notice, progressing to the semifinals before his eventual elimination by Ronaldo Souza in the quarterfinals. Miller lost the fight by unanimous decision.

After a period of verbal sparring on Japanese, Brazilian and American media, Miller and Souza fought a rematch for the Dream Middleweight belt, which had recently been vacated after Gegard Mousasi's departure to the Light Heavyweight division. The fight ended in a no-contest after Miller landed an illegal soccer kick to Souza's forehead, opening a large gash and prompting a doctor's stoppage. Both fighters agreed to face each other again in September 2009, but the match was canceled after Souza signed with the Strikeforce promotion.

Miller fought Jake Shields for the vacant Strikeforce Middleweight Championship on November 7, 2009, on CBS as a part of Strikeforce: Fedor vs Rogers. Miller lost via unanimous decision (48–47, 49–46, and 49–46).

On April 17, 2010, Miller defeated Tim Stout at Strikeforce: Nashville by ground and pound TKO at 1:47 of the first round.

Miller was expected to face Robbie Lawler on June 16, 2010, at Strikeforce: Los Angeles, but was removed from the card after the Tennessee Athletic Commission suspended him for his part in the Nashville Brawl. After Shields' win over UFC veteran and former Pride FC Welterweight and Middlweight Champion Dan Henderson, Miller confronted Jake Shields for a title rematch. Although Shields was not surprised, Nick Diaz, Nate Diaz, and the rest of Team Gracie fought with Miller in the cage, prompting CBS announcer Gus Johnson to say "Gentlemen, we are on national television."

Although Mayhem aggressively called out Nick Diaz, a fight between the two never materialized. Mayhem instead fought Kazushi Sakuraba on September 25 at Dream 16. In pre-fight interviews, Miller expressed his desire to submit Sakuraba, saying "The Gracies couldn't do it. I want to." Miller won the fight by arm triangle choke.

On April 22, 2011, Miller announced via Twitter that in the wake of his Strikeforce contract expiration, he had signed a multi-fight deal with the UFC.

=== Strikeforce: Nashville brawl ===
On April 17, 2010, following Jake Shields' victory over Dan Henderson, Miller entered the cage unexpectedly during Shields' post-fight interview. During that interview, Miller interrupted Shields and asked "Where's my rematch, buddy?" Shields and associate Gilbert Melendez responded by pushing Miller away. Melendez, Nick Diaz, Nate Diaz, and other members of the Cesar Gracie Jiu-Jitsu camp attacked Miller, initiating a mass brawl. The fight was eventually broken up by referees, members of Dan Henderson's corner and the promoter's security personnel. Miller and five other participants in the brawl were each given three-month suspensions and fines ranging between $5,000 and $7,500.

Following the events of the Nashville Brawl, Miller expressed an interest in fighting Nick Diaz. The 170-pound Diaz refused, stating he was the Strikeforce Welterweight Champion and needed to continue to fight at that weight. He requested Miller move down to 170 lb to fight him. Miller continued to attempt to set up a fight, offering 183 lb as a catchweight. Diaz counter-offered a catchweight of 181 lb. Strikeforce CEO Scott Coker expressed interest in scheduling a fight, but was unable to do so prior to Strikeforce's acquisition by Zuffa.

=== Return to the UFC ===
On April 22, 2011, Miller signed a multi-fight agreement with the UFC.

Miller was expected to face Aaron Simpson on July 2, 2011, at UFC 132. However, on May 27, 2011, it was revealed that Miller would coach opposite Michael Bisping on Season 15 of The Ultimate Fighter. Miller was replaced by Brad Tavares on the UFC 132 card.

On December 3, 2011, Bisping defeated Miller during The Ultimate Fighter 14 Finale. Miller lost the fight via TKO at 3:34 of the third round.

Miller was then defeated by C. B. Dollaway on May 26, 2012, at UFC 146. After dropping Dollaway with a right hand, Miller appeared to injure his left knee. He was taken down for the rest of the fight and lost via unanimous decision (29–28, 30–26, and 29–28). Miller had previously stated on his Twitter page that if he lost the fight, he would retire.

Despite Miller's claim that he was considering retirement, Dana White opted to fire Miller one day after his loss to Dollaway. White cited unspecified "backstage antics" on the part of Miller as a partial reason for the cut, as well as Miller being a "clown" in his wardrobe choices before the fight. Miller later described a brief confrontation with backstage official Burt Watson over Miller's attempt to wear a gasmask and colorful paper bag over his face for his walk-out.

=== MMA Hour incident ===
On October 8, 2012, Miller appeared on Ariel Helwani's internet talk show the MMA Hour to promote his upcoming film Here Comes the Boom. Miller gave the interview "in character" as Lucky Patrick, his role from the film, and became upset when Helwani asked him to instead give the interview as Jason Miller. Still in his persona as Lucky Patrick, Miller stormed off of the set in a rage.

=== Return To MMA ===
On October 26, 2013, Miller announced on his official Twitter page that he would return to fighting. Venator FC announced on February 9, 2016, that Miller would face Luke Barnatt at Venator FC III for the promotion's Middleweight championship on May 21. After missing weight by 24 pounds, Miller was pulled from the fight and instead fought Mattia Schiavolin in a Light Heavyweight fight. Miller was submitted by rear naked choke.

In a 2016 interview with Chael Sonnen, Miller said that the loss to Schiavolin helped him to begin to turn his life around from the legal troubles and drug addiction that have plagued him since his retirement in 2012. He also went on to say that he felt a positive energy being back in the cage and would return to fighting, this time as a Light Heavyweight.

== Grappling career ==
Miller competed in the Southern California Pro-Am Invitational 2003, beating Kenny Bond and Sean Spangler to make it to the semi-final, where he lost to Rener Gracie.

== Legal issues ==
In August 2011, Miller was arrested in Chatham County, North Carolina. He was charged with simple assault and false imprisonment after his sister accused Miller of assaulting her at a house party.

Miller was arrested for an outstanding warrant on October 9, 2014, after a five-hour-long standoff with a SWAT team outside his Orange County, California, home. Over the course of the stand-off, Miller gave live updates through his Twitter account.

On October 16, 2015, law enforcement responded to a domestic disturbance call at Miller's residence involving Miller and two women. After deputies arrived, Miller threw a ceramic tile at them and threatened them with a fire extinguisher and a metal pole. He was tased by police and arrested for assault.

In March 2016, Miller was arrested in Mission Viejo, California. He was accused of vandalizing a brick wall outside of Stay Ready Tattoo with graffiti, said Roxi Fyad, spokeswoman of the Orange County district attorney’s office, a tattoo shop in Lake Forest, California two months prior.

On July 11, 2016, Miller was arrested in Costa Mesa, California, and charged with two counts of assault and battery after allegedly injuring a security guard and spitting on a police officer at the Saddle Ranch Chop House restaurant. The charges were later dismissed.

On October 23, 2018, Miller was arrested on charges of felony vandalism in Orange County after destroying property at his girlfriend's La Habra, California, home. Miller's girlfriend claimed that during an argument, Miller smashed a large marble table, punched holes in the walls, tore down doors, and derailed the home's garage door. He was arrested and held without bail in the Orange County detention center. The felony vandalism charge carried a maximum penalty of eight months in jail, but due to the nature of the incident, prior convictions, and a probation violation, Miller faced up to 23 years in a California state prison. While he initially pleaded not guilty, on July 19, 2019, it was reported that Miller had accepted a plea deal and was sentenced to one year in jail with time served being credited. He was released from jail in September 2019.

On August 21, 2020, Miller was arrested and charged with the felonies of first-degree burglary and grand theft auto. He was held in Orange County jail without bail. On May 11, 2021, Miller accepted a plea deal in which he would plead guilty to the vandalism charge and the grand theft auto charge would be dismissed. Miller was sentenced to one year of incarceration and two years of probation upon his release.

In October 2021, Miller was formally charged with felony assault and battery for an incident that took place at a California bar. Miller had been linked to an altercation at a bar, but by the time police arrived, the situation had de-escalated. While the complaining witness initially did not take legal action, the man was hospitalized after the incident, discovered his ribs had been broken, and later chose to press charges.

On August 30, 2023, Miller was arrested in Los Angeles County for allegedly choking a man that approached Miller at a West Hollywood night club.

== Championships and accomplishments ==
=== Mixed Martial Arts ===
- Icon Sport
  - Icon Sport Middleweight Championship (one time)
- Superbrawl
  - Superbrawl Welterweight Championship (one time)
  - North American Welterweight Championship (one time; first)
- International Sport Combat Federation
  - ISCF East Coast Middleweight Championship (one time; first)
    - One title defense
- World MMA Awards
  - Most Memorable Ring Entrance 2010 & 2009

=== Submission wrestling ===
- Grapplers Quest
  - Advanced Champion (2001, 2002)
  - U.S. National Grappling Championships - 1st Place, Advanced - Cruiserweight (180–189.9 lbs.)
  - Best in the West Champion (2003)

== Mixed martial arts record ==
Professional record breakdown
34 matches	23 wins	10 losses
By knockout	5	2
By submission	14	2
By decision	4	6
No contests	1	

Res.	Record	Opponent	Method	Event	Date	Round	Time	Location	Notes
Loss	23–10 (1)	Mattia Schiavolin	Submission (rear-naked choke)	Venator FC 3	May 21, 2016	2	3:10	Milan, Italy	Return to Light Heavyweight; Miller missed weight (209 lb).
Loss	23–9 (1)	C.B. Dollaway	Decision (unanimous)	UFC 146	May 26, 2012	3	5:00	Las Vegas, Nevada, United States	
Loss	23–8 (1)	Michael Bisping	TKO (knees to the body and punches)	The Ultimate Fighter 14 Finale	December 3, 2011	3	3:34	Las Vegas, Nevada, United States	
Win	23–7 (1)	Kazushi Sakuraba	Submission (arm-triangle choke)	Dream 16	September 25, 2010	1	2:09	Nagoya, Japan	
Win	22–7 (1)	Tim Stout	TKO (punches)	Strikeforce: Nashville	April 17, 2010	1	3:09	Nashville, Tennessee, United States	
Loss	21–7 (1)	Jake Shields	Decision (unanimous)	Strikeforce: Fedor vs. Rogers	November 7, 2009	5	5:00	Hoffman Estates, Illinois, United States	For the vacant Strikeforce Middleweight Championship.
NC	21–6 (1)	Ronaldo Souza	NC (cut)	Dream 9	May 26, 2009	1	2:33	Yokohama, Japan	For the vacant Dream Middleweight Championship.
Win	21–6	Kala Hose	Submission (rear-naked choke)	Kingdom MMA: Miller vs. Hose	April 18, 2009	1	2:27	Honolulu, Hawaii, United States	
Loss	20–6	Ronaldo Souza	Decision (unanimous)	Dream 4: Middleweight Grand Prix 2008 Second Round	June 15, 2008	2	5:00	Yokohama, Japan	Dream MWGP Quarter-Final.
Win	20–5	Katsuyori Shibata	TKO (punches)	Dream 3: Lightweight Grand Prix 2008 Second Round	May 11, 2008	1	6:57	Saitama, Japan	Dream MWGP Opening Round.
Win	19–5	Tim Kennedy	Decision (unanimous)	HDNet Fights – Reckless Abandon	December 15, 2007	3	5:00	Dallas, Texas, United States	
Win	18–5	Hiromitsu Miura	Decision (unanimous)	WEC 27	May 12, 2007	3	5:00	Las Vegas, Nevada, United States	
Win	17–5	Héctor Urbina	TKO (punches)	Icon Sport: Epic	March 31, 2007	1	1:11	Honolulu, Hawaii, United States	
Loss	16–5	Frank Trigg	TKO (soccer kicks)	Icon Sport – Mayhem vs Trigg	December 1, 2006	2	2:53	Honolulu, Hawaii, United States	Lost Icon Sport Middleweight Championship.
Win	16–4	Robbie Lawler	Submission (arm-triangle choke)	Icon Sport – Mayhem vs Lawler	September 2, 2006	3	2:50	Honolulu, Hawaii, United States	Won the Icon Sport Middleweight Championship.
Win	15–4	Lodune Sincaid	Submission (rear-naked choke)	WFA: King of the Streets	July 22, 2006	1	4:29	Los Angeles, California, United States	Light Heavyweight bout.
Win	14–4	Stefan Gamlin	Submission (arm-triangle choke)	Icon Sport – Mayhem vs Giant	May 26, 2006	1	0:46	Honolulu, Hawaii, United States	Openweight bout.
Win	13–4	Falaniko Vitale	Submission (rear-naked choke)	Icon Sport – Opposites Attract	October 28, 2005	2	2:41	Honolulu, Hawaii, United States	Return to Middleweight.
Win	12–4	Mark Moreno	Submission (armbar)	Superbrawl – Icon	July 23, 2005	1	4:54	Honolulu, Hawaii, United States	Won the Superbrawl North American Welterweight Championship. Miller vacated the title when he returned to Middleweight.
Loss	11–4	Georges St-Pierre	Decision (unanimous)	UFC 52	April 16, 2005	3	5:00	Las Vegas, Nevada, United States	Welterweight bout.
Win	11–3	Ronald Jhun	Technical Submission (arm-triangle choke)	SB 37 – SuperBrawl 37	October 16, 2004	2	N/A	Honolulu, Hawaii, United States	Won the Superbrawl Welterweight Championship.
Win	10–3	Egan Inoue	TKO (corner stoppage)	SB 32 – SuperBrawl 32	December 5, 2003	2	5:00	Honolulu, Hawaii, United States	
Win	9–3	Sean Taylor	Submission (triangle choke)	SB 31 – SuperBrawl 31	September 20, 2003	2	3:32	Honolulu, Hawaii, United States	
Win	8–3	Mark Longworth	Submission (rear-naked choke)	PFC – Put Up or Shut Up	August 23, 2003	2	N/A	Upland, California, United States	
Win	7–3	Jason Buck	Decision (split)	SB 30 – Collision Course	June 13, 2003	3	3:00	Honolulu, Hawaii, United States	Middleweight Tournament Semifinal.
Loss	6–3	Tim Kennedy	Decision (unanimous)	EC 50 – Extreme Challenge 50	February 23, 2003	3	5:00	Salt Lake City, Utah, United States	
Win	6–2	Denis Kang	Submission (rear-naked choke)	EC 50 – Extreme Challenge 50	February 23, 2003	2	1:41	Salt Lake City, Utah, United States	
Win	5–2	Todd Carney	TKO (corner stoppage)	FFP – February Fight Party	February 1, 2003	1	2:31	Atlanta, Georgia, United States	Defended the ISCF East Coast Middleweight Championship
Loss	4–2	Todd Carney	Submission (guillotine choke)	ISCF – Atlanta	August 16, 2002	1	1:32	Atlanta, Georgia, United States	
Win	4–1	Phil Ensminger	Submission (triangle choke)	RFC1 – The Beginning	July 13, 2002	1	3:23	Las Vegas, Nevada, United States	
Win	3–1	Toby Imada	Decision (unanimous)	XP 2 – Xtreme Pankration 2	April 12, 2002	2	5:00	Los Angeles, California, United States	
Loss	2–1	Chael Sonnen	Decision (unanimous)	HFP 1 – Rumble on the Reservation	March 30, 2002	2	5:00	Anza, California, United States	
Win	2–0	Todd Carney	Submission (rear-naked choke)	ISCF – Battle at the Brewery 2001	December 8, 2001	2	2:53	Atlanta, Georgia, United States	Won the ISCF East Coast Middleweight Championship.
Win	1–0	Brian Warren	Submission (rear-naked choke)	UP 1 – Ultimate Pankration 1	November 11, 2001	1	3:15	Cabazon, California, United States	

== Media ==
In the past, Miller appeared regularly on The Jason Ellis Show on SiriusXM Radio Faction (Sirius XM) XM 52 Sirius 41 on "Mayhem Mondays!!" as both a mixed martial arts expert and comedian, sharing amusing anecdotes and opinions. He returned to the Ellis Show for the first time since his incarceration on October 29, 2019.

Miller also appears briefly in several music videos of Jason Ellis's band TaintStick.

Miller also authors a monthly article for Fight! magazine with humorous articles on serious subjects.

He was the host of the MTV reality series Bully Beatdown in which he challenged bullies to a fight with other professional fighters, and if they accepted, they had the opportunity to win $10,000. If the bully lost, the person he picked on won the $10,000. In the first episode of the show's third season, Miller went on to take on the bully himself, making him lose all $10,000. Miller affectionately called his fans Mayhem Monkeys and himself the leader of the "monkey cult" and had a fan club of numbered monkeys.

Jason Miller appeared on G4's American Ninja Warrior, making it through the qualifying round with a time of 2:55.0. He was later eliminated in the second qualifying round.

He also appears in video games: Electronic Arts' EA Sports MMA and THQ's UFC Undisputed 3.

On July 20, 2010 (episode # 31), November 30, 2010 (episode #58), and September 28, 2011 (episode #143), Jason Miller appeared on the podcast The Joe Rogan Experience.

Miller also appears in Here Comes the Boom, in which he plays the role of "Lucky" Patrick Murray, an MMA fighter who goes in the ring against Kevin James's character, Scott Voss, in the film.

== See also ==
- List of male mixed martial artists
