= Robbie Lawler =

American mixed martial artist (born 1982)

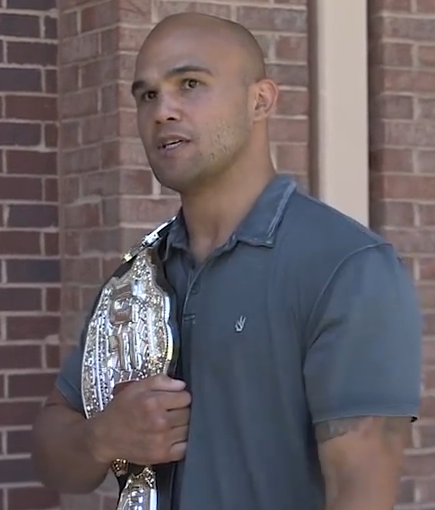
- Lawler in 2016
- Born: Robert Glenn Lawler; March 20, 1982 (age 44); San Diego, California, U.S.
- Other names: Ruthless
- Nationality: American
- Height: 5 ft 11 in (180 cm)
- Weight: 170 lb (77 kg; 12 st 2 lb)
- Division: Welterweight (2001–2004, 2013–2023); Middleweight (2004–2012, 2021)
- Reach: 74 1/2 in (189 cm)
- Stance: Southpaw
- Fighting out of: Coconut Creek, Florida, U.S.
- Team: Kill Cliff FC (2017–2023); American Top Team (2013–2016); Miletich Fighting Systems (2000–2013)
- Rank: Brown belt in Brazilian Jiu-Jitsu
- Years active: 2001–2023

Mixed martial arts record
- Total: 47
- Wins: 30
- By knockout: 22
- By submission: 1
- By decision: 7
- Losses: 16
- By knockout: 4
- By submission: 5
- By decision: 7
- No contests: 1

Other information
- Spouse: Marcia Suzanne Lawler
- Children: 1
- Mixed martial arts record from Sherdog

Robert Glenn Lawler (born March 20, 1982) is an American former professional mixed martial artist. A professional fighter from 2001 to 2023, he most notably competed in the Welterweight and Middleweight divisions of the Ultimate Fighting Championship (UFC), where he was the former UFC Welterweight Champion. He formerly competed in the Middleweight division of EliteXC, where he was the longest-reigning EliteXC Middleweight Champion. He also competed in PRIDE FC, Strikeforce, the International Fight League (IFL), KOTC, SuperBrawl, and ICON Sport, where he was their Middleweight Champion.

Nicknamed "Ruthless", he is known for his aggressive fighting style, and was considered a fan favorite. Three of Lawler's title bouts, against Johny Hendricks (at UFC 171, in 2014), Rory MacDonald (at UFC 189, in 2015), and Carlos Condit (at UFC 195, in 2016) earned numerous awards for the Fight of the Year in their respective years.

== Early life and education ==
Lawler was born in San Diego, California. He moved to Bettendorf, Iowa, at the age of ten to live with his father, who served in the Marines. Robbie Lawler is 1/4th Filipino as his mother is 1/2 German and 1/2 Filipino. Lawler began training in taekwondo at the age of eight, picking up karate two years later. Lawler attended Bettendorf High School where he received All-State honors in wrestling and All-Conference in football. Lawler was taken under the wing of Pat Miletich when he was 16 years old and began training with Miletich Fighting Systems as soon as he graduated in 2000.

== Mixed martial arts career ==
=== Early career ===
Lawler made his professional debut in 2001 and won his first four career fights all by TKO/KO.

=== Ultimate Fighting Championship ===
Lawler made his UFC debut at UFC 37 against veteran Aaron Riley. Lawler won the bout via unanimous decision. Lawler fought again in the next month against Steve Berger at UFC 37.5 and won via TKO. In his next fight, Lawler faced another veteran, Tiki Ghosn at UFC 40 and won in a highlight-reel knockout. Lawler then fought against Pete Spratt at UFC 42 and lost after he submitted due to a knee injury. Lawler came back to get a win over fellow boxing and wrestling specialist Chris Lytle via unanimous decision at UFC 45.

In his next UFC bout, Lawler faced former WEC Welterweight Champion and future longtime Strikeforce Welterweight Champion Nick Diaz at UFC 47. Lawler was handed the first of only three knockout losses of his career to date in the second round. Lawler then lost again at UFC 50 against the late Evan Tanner, who would win the UFC Middleweight Championship in his next fight.

=== Post-UFC ===
Lawler then fought at SuperBrawl in Hawaii, defeating Falaniko Vitale via knockout to become the SuperBrawl Middleweight Champion. Lawler then made his debut for King of the Cage, being scheduled to fight Jeremy Brown, and won via armbar submission.

Lawler then faced Falaniko Vitale again, this time for the ICON Sport Middleweight Championship, and won again in the rematch by knockout, becoming the ICON Sport Middleweight Champion.

In his next bout and first title defense, Lawler lost to Jason "Mayhem" Miller via arm-triangle choke submission.

Lawler then made his PRIDE debut in Las Vegas, Nevada against Joey Villasenor at PRIDE 32 and won via knockout.

In his next fight, Lawler made his IFL debut in Atlanta, Georgia against Eduardo Pamplona and won via TKO.

On March 31, 2007, he fought Frank Trigg for the ICON Sport Middleweight Championship and won by KO in the fourth round, becoming the ICON Sport Middleweight Champion a second time. On September 15, 2007, he fought PRIDE Fighting Championships veteran Murilo Rua for the EliteXC Middleweight Championship and won by TKO in the third round due to punches.

Lawler was scheduled to fight Kala Hose for the ICON Sport Middleweight Championship on December 15, 2007, in Honolulu, Hawaii, Lawler however pulled out of the fight due to an injury. After pulling out again due to the same circumstances, ICON Sport stripped Lawler of the middleweight title on February 9, 2008, for failing to defend the title.

Lawler defended his EliteXC Middleweight Championship against Scott Smith at EliteXC: Primetime on May 31, 2008, at the Prudential Center in Newark, New Jersey, which ended in a no contest after Smith caught an accidental finger in the eye from Lawler.

On July 26, 2008, Lawler and Scott Smith had their rematch at EliteXC: Unfinished Business. Lawler defeated Smith by TKO in the second round.

=== Strikeforce ===
After defeating Scott Smith, Lawler's employers, EliteXC, announced that they would be shutting down and filing for bankruptcy. Lawler's contract was picked up by Strikeforce with his first bout under the Strikeforce banner on June 6, 2009, against Jake Shields. The bout was fought at a catchweight of 182 lb. Lawler lost via submission due to a guillotine choke at 2:02 of the first round.

Lawler faced K-1 veteran Melvin Manhoef on January 30, 2010, at Strikeforce: Miami. During the bout, Lawler suffered significant damage to his leg which Manhoef inflicted using leg kicks. In dramatic fashion, Lawler came back to win by knockout late in the first round with an overhand right.

Lawler was expected to face Jason Miller on June 16, 2010, at Strikeforce: Los Angeles but Lawler instead faced former Strikeforce Light Heavyweight Champion Renato Sobral in a 195 lbs. Catchweight bout. Lawler had two unsuccessful attempts to meet the 195 lbs mark at the Strikeforce: Los Angeles Weigh-Ins, but was finally booked for the fight weighing 195.5 pounds, after stepping on the scale for the third time. Sobral defeated Lawler via unanimous decision. Sobral utilized his reach advantage and grappling expertise to defeat the much smaller Lawler.

Lawler fought Olympic Games silver medalist Matt Lindland at Strikeforce: Henderson vs. Babalu II on December 4, 2010. He defeated Lindland fifty seconds into the first round via KO.

Lawler faced Strikeforce Middleweight Champion Ronaldo Souza on January 29, 2011, at Strikeforce: Diaz vs. Cyborg. Lawler rocked Souza in the first round but ended up losing the fight via submission in the third round.

Lawler returned and faced Tim Kennedy at Strikeforce: Fedor vs. Henderson. He lost the fight via unanimous decision, being dominantly controlled throughout the fight on the floor by Kennedy.

Lawler got back on track with a highlight reel first-round TKO victory due to a flying knee over rising prospect Adlan Amagov at Strikeforce: Rockhold vs. Jardine.

Lawler next faced Lorenz Larkin at Strikeforce: Rockhold vs. Kennedy on July 14, 2012. He lost the fight via unanimous decision, despite rocking Larkin early in the first round with a short right hook. He left Miletich Fighting Systems after this loss and joined Florida-based gym American Top Team.

=== Return to UFC ===
Lawler returned to the Welterweight division and faced Josh Koscheck on February 23, 2013, at UFC 157. He won via first-round TKO. Koscheck visibly protested the stoppage, but replay footage showed he was not defending himself in a dangerous position, as Lawler landed repeated blows. The finish earned him the Knockout of the Night bonus.

Lawler was expected to face former Strikeforce Welterweight Champion Tarec Saffiedine on July 27, 2013, at UFC on Fox 8. However, Saffiedine was forced out of the bout with an injury and was replaced by Siyar Bahadurzada. Then on July 11, it was announced that Bahadurzada also pulled out of the bout and was replaced by Bobby Voelker. Lawler won the fight via knockout in the second round.

Lawler next faced Rory MacDonald at UFC 167. He won the fight via split decision.

On December 13, 2013, news came that Georges St-Pierre would be taking an indefinite break from MMA and vacate the UFC Welterweight Championship. Following the announcement, Dana White announced that Lawler would face Johny Hendricks on March 15, 2014, at UFC 171 for the vacated title. Lawler lost the close back-and-forth bout via unanimous decision. Despite the loss, the fight earned Lawler his first Fight of the Night bonus award.

Returning quickly to the cage, Lawler replaced an injured Tarec Saffiedine and fought Jake Ellenberger at UFC 173 on May 24, 2014. He won the fight via TKO in the third round due to a combination of a knee and punches.

Lawler faced Matt Brown in a 5-round Welterweight title eliminator bout on July 26, 2014, at UFC on Fox 12. He won the fight via unanimous decision. The win also earned him a Fight of the Night bonus award.

==== UFC Welterweight Champion ====
Lawler fought a rematch with Johny Hendricks for the UFC Welterweight Championship at UFC 181 on December 6, 2014. He won the fight, and the title, via split decision.

A rematch with Rory MacDonald took place on July 11, 2015, at UFC 189. Lawler retained his title in the fifth round via TKO. The back and forth action earned both participants Fight of the Night honors. The fight was considered an instant classic by fans and media alike with UFC President Dana White hailing it as one of the best welterweight fights in the promotion's history. The fight was chosen as the Sherdog Fight of the Year for 2015. The fight has since been acclaimed as one of the greatest in the history of mixed martial arts, voted the best fight in the history of the UFC in an ESPN poll in 2017 as well as it has earned a position in the UFC Hall of Fame Fight Wing in 2023.

Lawler was expected to face Carlos Condit on November 15, 2015, at UFC 193. However, the bout was scrapped from the event after Lawler suffered a thumb injury. The fight was rescheduled as the headliner at UFC 195 on January 2, 2016. Lawler defended his title, and defeated Condit via split decision in a very close fight. The bout also earned Lawler his fourth Fight of the Night bonus award.

Lawler faced Tyron Woodley on July 30, 2016, in the main event at UFC 201. He lost the fight via knockout early in the first round, thus losing the title.

==== Post-championship ====
Lawler was briefly linked to a bout with Donald Cerrone on November 12, 2016, at UFC 205. However, just a few days after the announcement, it was revealed that Lawler had declined the fight to allow more recovery time from his last defeat. He was replaced by The Ultimate Fighter: Team Jones vs. Team Sonnen middleweight winner Kelvin Gastelum.

Lawler was expected to face Cerrone on July 8, 2017, at UFC 213. However, reports began to circulate on June 28 that Cerrone had sustained a minor injury and that the pairing would be left intact, but is expected to take place three weeks later at UFC 214. UFC President Dana White confirmed later that same day that Cerrone in fact had a staph infection and a pulled groin.

Lawler faced Cerrone on July 29, 2017, at UFC 214. He won the fight via unanimous decision. In the post fight interview, Lawler dedicated his win to Matt Hughes, who was involved in a truck accident in June 2017 and was then recovering from serious injuries.

Lawler faced Rafael Dos Anjos on December 16, 2017, in the main event at UFC on Fox: Lawler vs. dos Anjos. He lost the fight by unanimous decision, and he suffered from a torn ACL from the fight which would prevent him from fighting in 2018.

Lawler faced UFC newcomer Ben Askren on March 2, 2019, at UFC 235. Although Lawler looked to have the upper hand on Askren early on in the fight, he eventually lost the fight due to a bulldog choke. The ending of the fight was controversial because referee Herb Dean stopped the fight thinking that Lawler had passed out when this may not have been the case; Lawler's arm appeared to go limp indicating he had passed out, however, while Dean was checking to see if he was out he appeared to signal a thumbs up and jumped up fully conscious straight after the stoppage. Despite that, Nevada State Athletic Commission director Bob Bennett was in full support of Dean's decision to stop the fight.

A rematch with Tyron Woodley was expected to take place on June 29, 2019, at UFC on ESPN 3. On May 16, 2019, it was reported that Woodley suffered a hand injury and was pulled from the fight. The bout was ultimately scrapped.

Lawler faced Colby Covington on August 3, 2019, at UFC on ESPN 5. He lost the bout via unanimous decision.

Lawler was scheduled to face Santiago Ponzinibbio on December 14, 2019, at UFC 245. However, on October 12, 2019, it was revealed that Ponzinibbio had pulled out of the fight due to a staph infection.

Lawler faced Neil Magny, replacing Geoff Neal, on August 29, 2020, at UFC Fight Night 175. He lost the fight via unanimous decision.

Lawler was expected to face Mike Perry on November 21, 2020, at UFC 255. However, due to injuries, Lawler pulled out of the bout.

Lawler faced returning veteran Nick Diaz in a rematch on September 25, 2021, at UFC 266. The bout was contested at middleweight and was a special non-title, non-main event five round fight. In the third round, Lawler knocked down Diaz, who did not respond to the referee's instruction to return to his feet. As a result Lawler was awarded the win by TKO.

Lawler faced Bryan Barberena on July 2, 2022, at UFC 276. He lost the back-and-forth bout by TKO in the second round. This fight earned him a Fight of the Night award.

Lawler was scheduled to face Santiago Ponzinibbio on December 10, 2022, at UFC 282. However, the week of the event, Lawler was forced to withdraw due to an undisclosed injury.

On April 8, 2023, it was announced that Lawler and MacDonald would be inducted to the UFC Fight Wing Hall of Fame in July 2023 for their welterweight title bout from July 2015.

Lawler faced Niko Price on July 8, 2023, at UFC 290. In his retirement bout, he knocked Price out 38 seconds into the bout.

==== Hall of Fame ====
During UFC 313's broadcast in March 2025, Lawler was announced as the next "modern wing" UFC Hall of Fame inductee during International Fight Week festivities in Las Vegas this June.

== Freestyle wrestling ==
Lawler made his Real American Freestyle debut against former UFC Middleweight Champion Khamzat Chimaev in the co-main event on October 23, 2026 at RAF 14. Lawler lost the match by technical fall.

== Personal life ==
Lawler is married to Marcia Suzanne Lawler (née Fritz). He also has an older brother.

== Championships and accomplishments ==
=== Mixed martial arts ===
- Ultimate Fighting Championship
  - UFC Hall of Fame (Modern wing, Class of 2025)
  - UFC Hall of Fame (Fight wing, Class of 2023) vs. Rory MacDonald 2 at UFC 189
  - UFC Welterweight Championship (One time)
    - Two successful title defenses
  - Fight of the Night (Five times) vs. Johny Hendricks, Matt Brown, Rory MacDonald 2, Carlos Condit, and Bryan Barberena
  - Knockout of the Night (One time) vs. Josh Koscheck
  - UFC Encyclopedia Awards
    - Fight of the Night (One time) vs. Aaron Riley
    - Knockout of the Night (One time) vs. Steve Berger
  - Tied (Stephen Thompson & Carlos Prates) for fifth most knockouts in UFC Welterweight division history (7)
  - Eighth most significant strikes landed in UFC Welterweight Division history (1,200)
  - Second highest takedown accuracy percentage in UFC Welterweight Division history (72.7%)
  - UFC.com Awards
    - 2013: Ranked #8 Fighter of the Year & Ranked #5 Upset of the Year vs. Rory MacDonald 1
    - 2014: Fight of the Year vs. Johny Hendricks at UFC 171, Fighter of the Year & Ranked #7 Fight of the Year vs. Matt Brown
    - 2015: Fight of the Year vs. Rory MacDonald 2 at UFC 189
    - 2016: Half-Year Awards: Best Fight of the 1HY & Ranked #3 Fight of the Year vs. Carlos Condit
    - 2023: Ranked #7 Knockout of the Year vs. Niko Price
- Elite Xtreme Combat
  - EliteXC Middleweight Championship (One time; Last)
    - One successful title defense
    - One successful title retainment
- ICON Sport
  - ICON Sport Middleweight Championship (Two times)
- Superbrawl
  - Superbrawl Middleweight Championship (One time; Last)
- RotoWire
  - 2010s Fight of the Decade vs. Rory MacDonald 2 at UFC 189
- World MMA Awards
  - 2014 Fighter of the Year
  - 2015 Fight of the Year vs. Rory MacDonald 2 at UFC 189
- Sherdog
  - 2010 Knockout of the Year vs. Melvin Manhoef on January 30
  - 2010 All-Violence Second Team
  - 2014 All-Violence First Team
  - 2015 All-Violence First Team
  - 2013 Comeback Fighter of the Year
  - 2014 Fighter of the Year
  - 2014 Fight of the Year vs. Johny Hendricks at UFC 171
  - 2015 Fight of the Year vs. Rory MacDonald 2 at UFC 189
  - 2016 Fight of the Year vs. Carlos Condit at UFC 195
- Combat Press
  - 2014 Fighter of the Year
  - 2014 Fight of the Year vs. Johny Hendricks at UFC 171
  - 2015 Fight of the Year vs. Rory MacDonald 2 at UFC 189
  - 2015 Comeback of the Year vs. Rory MacDonald 2 at UFC 189
- Inside MMA
  - 2013 Breakthrough Fighter of the Year Bazzie Award
  - 2014 Fight of the Year Bazzie Award vs. Johny Hendricks at UFC 171
- MMA Fighting
  - 2014 Fighter of the Year
  - 2014 Fight of the Year vs. Johny Hendricks at UFC 171
  - 2015 Fight of the Year vs. Rory MacDonald 2 at UFC 189
  - 2016 Fight of the Year vs. Carlos Condit at UFC 195
  - 2010s Fight of the Decade vs. Rory MacDonald 2 at UFC 189
- MMA Junkie
  - 2013 Comeback Fighter of the Year
  - 2014 Fighter of the Year
  - 2014 March Fight of the Month vs. Johny Hendricks
  - 2015 Fight of the Year vs. Rory MacDonald 2 at UFC 189
  - 2015 July Fight of the Month vs. Rory MacDonald 2
  - 2016 Fight of the Year vs. Carlos Condit at UFC 195
  - 2016 January Fight of the Month vs. Carlos Condit
- Bleacher Report
  - 2010 Knockout of the Year vs. Melvin Manhoef
  - 2013 #10 Ranked Fighter of the Year
  - 2014 Fighter of the Year
  - 2014 Fight of the Year vs. Johny Hendricks at UFC 171
  - 2014 #4 Ranked Fight of the Year vs. Matt Brown at UFC on Fox: Lawler vs. Brown
  - 2015 Fight of the Year vs. Rory MacDonald 2 at UFC 189
- Wrestling Observer Newsletter awards
  - 2014 MMA Match of the Year vs. Johny Hendricks at UFC 171
  - 2015 MMA Match of the Year vs. Rory Macdonald 2 at UFC 189
  - 2016 MMA Match of the Year vs. Carlos Condit at UFC 195
- Yahoo Sports
  - 2013 Comeback Fighter of the Year
  - 2014 Fighter of the Year
  - 2014 Fight of the Year vs. Johny Hendricks at UFC 171
  - 2015 Fight of the Year vs. Rory MacDonald 2 at UFC 189
- Bloody Elbow
  - 2014 Fighter of the Year
- MMA Weekly
  - 2015 Fight of the Year vs. Rory MacDonald 2 at UFC 189
- CBS Sports
  - 2016 #4 Ranked UFC Fight of the Year vs. Carlos Condit

== Mixed martial arts record ==
Professional record breakdown
47 matches	30 wins	16 losses
By knockout	22	4
By submission	1	5
By decision	7	7
No contests	1	

Res.	Record	Opponent	Method	Event	Date	Round	Time	Location	Notes
Win	30–16 (1)	Niko Price	KO (punches)	UFC 290	July 8, 2023	1	0:38	Las Vegas, Nevada, United States	
Loss	29–16 (1)	Bryan Barberena	TKO (punches)	UFC 276	July 2, 2022	2	4:47	Las Vegas, Nevada, United States	Fight of the Night.
Win	29–15 (1)	Nick Diaz	TKO (retirement)	UFC 266	September 25, 2021	3	0:44	Las Vegas, Nevada, United States	Middleweight bout.
Loss	28–15 (1)	Neil Magny	Decision (unanimous)	UFC Fight Night: Smith vs. Rakić	August 29, 2020	3	5:00	Las Vegas, Nevada, United States	
Loss	28–14 (1)	Colby Covington	Decision (unanimous)	UFC on ESPN: Covington vs. Lawler	August 3, 2019	5	5:00	Newark, New Jersey, United States	
Loss	28–13 (1)	Ben Askren	Technical Submission (bulldog choke)	UFC 235	March 2, 2019	1	3:20	Las Vegas, Nevada, United States	
Loss	28–12 (1)	Rafael dos Anjos	Decision (unanimous)	UFC on Fox: Lawler vs. dos Anjos	December 16, 2017	5	5:00	Winnipeg, Manitoba, Canada	
Win	28–11 (1)	Donald Cerrone	Decision (unanimous)	UFC 214	July 29, 2017	3	5:00	Anaheim, California, United States	
Loss	27–11 (1)	Tyron Woodley	KO (punches)	UFC 201	July 30, 2016	1	2:12	Atlanta, Georgia, United States	Lost the UFC Welterweight Championship.
Win	27–10 (1)	Carlos Condit	Decision (split)	UFC 195	January 2, 2016	5	5:00	Las Vegas, Nevada, United States	Defended the UFC Welterweight Championship. Fight of the Night.
Win	26–10 (1)	Rory MacDonald	TKO (punches)	UFC 189	July 11, 2015	5	1:00	Las Vegas, Nevada, United States	Defended the UFC Welterweight Championship. Fight of the Night.
Win	25–10 (1)	Johny Hendricks	Decision (split)	UFC 181	December 6, 2014	5	5:00	Las Vegas, Nevada, United States	Won the UFC Welterweight Championship.
Win	24–10 (1)	Matt Brown	Decision (unanimous)	UFC on Fox: Lawler vs. Brown	July 26, 2014	5	5:00	San Jose, California, United States	UFC Welterweight title eliminator; Brown missed weight (172.5 lb). Fight of the Night.
Win	23–10 (1)	Jake Ellenberger	TKO (knee and punches)	UFC 173	May 24, 2014	3	3:06	Las Vegas, Nevada, United States	
Loss	22–10 (1)	Johny Hendricks	Decision (unanimous)	UFC 171	March 15, 2014	5	5:00	Dallas, Texas, United States	For the vacant UFC Welterweight Championship. Fight of the Night.
Win	22–9 (1)	Rory MacDonald	Decision (split)	UFC 167	November 16, 2013	3	5:00	Las Vegas, Nevada, United States	
Win	21–9 (1)	Bobby Voelker	KO (head kick and punch)	UFC on Fox: Johnson vs. Moraga	July 27, 2013	2	0:24	Seattle, Washington, United States	
Win	20–9 (1)	Josh Koscheck	TKO (punches)	UFC 157	February 23, 2013	1	3:57	Anaheim, California, United States	Return to Welterweight. Knockout of the Night.
Loss	19–9 (1)	Lorenz Larkin	Decision (unanimous)	Strikeforce: Rockhold vs. Kennedy	July 14, 2012	3	5:00	Portland, Oregon, United States	
Win	19–8 (1)	Adlan Amagov	TKO (flying knee and punches)	Strikeforce: Rockhold vs. Jardine	January 7, 2012	1	1:48	Las Vegas, Nevada, United States	
Loss	18–8 (1)	Tim Kennedy	Decision (unanimous)	Strikeforce: Fedor vs. Henderson	July 30, 2011	3	5:00	Hoffman Estates, Illinois, United States	
Loss	18–7 (1)	Ronaldo Souza	Submission (rear-naked choke)	Strikeforce: Diaz vs. Cyborg	January 29, 2011	3	2:00	San Jose, California, United States	For the Strikeforce Middleweight Championship.
Win	18–6 (1)	Matt Lindland	KO (punch)	Strikeforce: Henderson vs. Babalu II	December 4, 2010	1	0:50	St. Louis, Missouri, United States	
Loss	17–6 (1)	Renato Sobral	Decision (unanimous)	Strikeforce: Los Angeles	June 16, 2010	3	5:00	Los Angeles, California, United States	Catchweight (195 lb) bout.
Win	17–5 (1)	Melvin Manhoef	KO (punch)	Strikeforce: Miami	January 30, 2010	1	3:33	Sunrise, Florida, United States	
Loss	16–5 (1)	Jake Shields	Submission (guillotine choke)	Strikeforce: Lawler vs. Shields	June 6, 2009	1	2:02	St. Louis, Missouri, United States	Catchweight (180 lb) bout.
Win	16–4 (1)	Scott Smith	TKO (kicks and punches)	EliteXC: Unfinished Business	July 26, 2008	2	2:35	Stockton, California, United States	Defended the EliteXC Middleweight Championship.
NC	15–4 (1)	Scott Smith	NC (thumb in the eye)	EliteXC: Primetime	May 31, 2008	3	3:26	Newark, New Jersey, United States	Retained the EliteXC Middleweight Championship. Accidental eye poke rendered Smith unable to continue.
Win	15–4	Murilo Rua	KO (punches)	EliteXC: Uprising	September 15, 2007	3	2:04	Honolulu, Hawaii, United States	Won the EliteXC Middleweight Championship.
Win	14–4	Frank Trigg	KO (punches)	ICON Sport: Epic	March 31, 2007	4	1:40	Honolulu, Hawaii, United States	Won the ICON Sport Middleweight Championship.
Win	13–4	Eduardo Pamplona	TKO (punches)	IFL: Atlanta	February 23, 2007	3	1:36	Atlanta, Georgia, United States	
Win	12–4	Joey Villaseñor	KO (flying knee and punches)	PRIDE 32	October 21, 2006	1	0:22	Las Vegas, Nevada, United States	
Loss	11–4	Jason Miller	Submission (arm-triangle choke)	ICON Sport: Mayhem vs. Lawler	September 2, 2006	3	2:50	Honolulu, Hawaii, United States	Lost the ICON Sport Middleweight Championship.
Win	11–3	Falaniko Vitale	KO (punches)	ICON Sport: Lawler vs. Niko II	February 25, 2006	1	3:38	Honolulu, Hawaii, United States	Won the ICON Sport Middleweight Championship.
Win	10–3	Jeremy Brown	Submission (armbar)	KOTC: Xtreme Edge	September 17, 2005	1	2:48	Indianapolis, Indiana, United States	
Win	9–3	Falaniko Vitale	KO (punches)	SuperBrawl: Icon	July 23, 2005	2	4:36	Honolulu, Hawaii, United States	Won the SuperBrawl Middleweight Championship.
Loss	8–3	Evan Tanner	Submission (triangle choke)	UFC 50	October 22, 2004	1	2:22	Atlantic City, New Jersey, United States	Middleweight debut.
Loss	8–2	Nick Diaz	KO (punch)	UFC 47	April 2, 2004	2	1:31	Las Vegas, Nevada, United States	
Win	8–1	Chris Lytle	Decision (unanimous)	UFC 45	November 21, 2003	3	5:00	Uncasville, Connecticut, United States	
Loss	7–1	Pete Spratt	TKO (knee injury)	UFC 42	April 25, 2003	2	2:28	Miami, Florida, United States	
Win	7–0	Tiki Ghosn	KO (punches)	UFC 40	November 22, 2002	1	1:29	Las Vegas, Nevada, United States	
Win	6–0	Steve Berger	TKO (punches)	UFC 37.5	June 22, 2002	2	0:27	Las Vegas, Nevada, United States	
Win	5–0	Aaron Riley	Decision (unanimous)	UFC 37	May 10, 2002	3	5:00	Bossier City, Louisiana, United States	
Win	4–0	Saburo Kawakatsu	TKO (punches)	Shogun 1	December 15, 2001	1	4:49	Honolulu, Hawaii, United States	
Win	3–0	Marco Macera	TKO (punches)	Extreme Challenge 41	July 13, 2001	1	1:19	Davenport, Iowa, United States	
Win	2–0	Landon Showalter	KO (punches)	IFC: Warriors Challenge 13	June 15, 2001	1	0:14	Fresno, California, United States	
Win	1–0	John Reed	TKO (punches)	Extreme Challenge 39	April 7, 2001	1	2:14	Springfield, Illinois, United States	

== Pay-per-view bouts ==
No.	Event	Fight	Date	Venue	City	PPV Buys
1.	UFC 171	Hendricks vs. Lawler	March 15, 2014	American Airlines Center	Dallas, Texas, United States	300,000
2.	UFC 181	Hendricks vs. Lawler 2	December 6, 2014	Mandalay Bay Events Center	Las Vegas, Nevada, United States	400,000
3.	UFC 195	Lawler vs. Condit	January 2, 2016	MGM Grand Garden Arena	Las Vegas, Nevada, United States	230,000
4.	UFC 201	Lawler vs. Woodley	July 30, 2016	Philips Arena	Atlanta, Georgia, United States	240,000

== See also ==
- List of male mixed martial artists

Achievements
Preceded by Murilo Rua	2nd Elite XC Middleweight Champion; September 15, 2007 – October 20, 2008	Succeeded by Elite XC ceased operations
Preceded by Johny Hendricks	10th UFC Welterweight Champion; December 6, 2014 – July 30, 2016	Succeeded by Tyron Woodley
Awards
Preceded by Chris Weidman	World MMA Fighter of the Year; 2014	Succeeded by Conor McGregor
Preceded by José Aldo vs. Chad Mendes	World MMA Fight of the Year; 2015 vs. Rory MacDonald at UFC 189	Succeeded by Cub Swanson vs. Doo Ho Choi
