= Extreme Challenge (mixed martial arts) =

American mixed martial arts promotion

Extreme Challenge (EC) is an American mixed martial arts promotion founded by promoter and fighter manager Monte Cox in 1996. Centered in Iowa and the Midwest, it was described in 2015 as the longest-running American promotion in the sport other than the Ultimate Fighting Championship (UFC), having staged about 200 events.

== History ==
Cox was a sports editor at the Quad-City Times and a boxing promoter when he became involved in no-holds-barred fighting in the mid-1990s. After promoting the Quad City Ultimate shows in early 1996, he launched Extreme Challenge in Des Moines as his flagship promotion. By 2014, the promotion had staged its 163rd show and was described as the longest-running promotion under the same owner.

== Role in Midwest MMA ==
Extreme Challenge became closely associated with the Miletich camp. A 2015 account said that, while the camp was one of MMA's dominant teams, virtually all of its fighters got their start with the promotion; it identified Jeremy Horn, Matt Hughes, Tim Sylvia, Dan Severn, and Robbie Lawler among its early stars. A 2014 profile likewise described the promotion as part of the network through which Cox and Pat Miletich developed the Quad Cities MMA scene.

== Legacy ==
A 2013 history of women's MMA identified an Extreme Challenge show in Salt Lake City in 1998 as a candidate for the first women's MMA bout in the United States, while cautioning that results before 2001 were only sparsely recorded.

In 2015, UFC Fight Pass acquired the promotion's videotape library as one of eight archival collections added to the service; UFC said the group of acquisitions would add approximately 6,500 hours and more than 13,000 fights to its library.

== Later activity ==
Extreme Challenge returned from a brief hiatus in 2024. A scheduled Extreme Challenge 242 card in Shelbyville, Illinois, in August was cancelled, but Extreme Challenge 241 was held in Shelbyville that November.
