= Strikeforce: Tate vs. Rousey =

Strikeforce mixed martial arts event in 2012

- The poster for Strikeforce: Tate vs. Rousey
- Promotion: Strikeforce
- Date: March 3, 2012
- Venue: Nationwide Arena
- City: Columbus, Ohio, United States

Event chronology
Strikeforce: Rockhold vs. Jardine	Strikeforce: Tate vs. Rousey	Strikeforce: Barnett vs. Cormier

Strikeforce: Tate vs. Rousey was a mixed martial arts event that was held by Strikeforce. It took place on March 3, 2012 at the Nationwide Arena in Columbus, Ohio, United States.

== Background ==
The event was expected to host the finals of Strikeforce's Heavyweight Grand Prix with Josh Barnett taking on Daniel Cormier, but the bout did not materialize due to Cormier's lingering hand injury. The finals were instead held at Strikeforce: Barnett vs. Cormier that May, where Cormier won the tournament via unanimous decision.

Gegard Mousasi was expected to face Mike Kyle at this event, but Kyle withdrew due to injury. The bout was rescheduled for Strikeforce: Marquardt vs. Saffiedine the following January, where Mousasi submitted Kyle in the first round.

Derek Brunson was scheduled to face Ronaldo Souza on this card. However, the Ohio State Athletic Commission denied Brunson's fight license based on an eye exam he had submitted. Bristol Marunde signed as his replacement. The Souza/Brunson bout was rescheduled for Strikeforce: Rousey vs. Kaufman that August, where Souza won via first-round knockout.

== Results ==
Main card (Showtime)
Weight class				Method	Round	Time	Notes
Women's Bantamweight	Ronda Rousey	def.	Miesha Tate (c)	Technical Submission (armbar)	1	4:27	(Note: For the Strikeforce Women's Bantamweight Championship.)
Lightweight	Josh Thomson	def.	K. J. Noons	Decision (unanimous) (29–28, 29–28, 29–28)	3	5:00
Welterweight	Kazuo Misaki	def.	Paul Daley	Decision (split) (30–27, 28–29, 29–28)	3	5:00
Middleweight	Ronaldo Souza	def.	Bristol Marunde	Submission (arm-triangle choke)	3	2:43
Preliminary card (Showtime Extreme)
Middleweight	Lumumba Sayers	def.	Scott Smith	Submission (guillotine choke)	1	1:34
Women's Bantamweight	Sarah Kaufman	def.	Alexis Davis	Decision (majority) (29–29, 29–28, 29–28)	3	5:00
Lightweight	Pat Healy	def.	Caros Fodor	Submission (arm-triangle choke)	3	3:35
Welterweight	Roger Bowling	def.	Brandon Saling	TKO (punches)	2	1:15
Lightweight	Ryan Couture	def.	Conor Heun	TKO (punches)	3	2:52

== Reported Payout ==
The following is the reported payout to the fighters as reported to the Ohio Athletic Commission.

- Ronda Rousey: $32,000 (includes $17,000 win bonus) def. Miesha Tate: $19,000
- Josh Thomson: $80,000 (no win bonus) def. K. J. Noons: $38,000
- Kazuo Misaki: $50,000 (no win bonus) def. Paul Daley: $45,000
- Lumumba Sayers: $10,000 (includes $5,000 win bonus) def. Scott Smith: $15,000
- Ronaldo Souza: $92,000 (includes $22,000 win bonus) def. Bristol Marunde: $10,000
- Sarah Kaufman: $25,000 (includes $10,000 win bonus) def. Alexis Davis: $4,000
- Roger Bowling: $16,000 (includes $8,000 win bonus) def. Brandon Saling: $5,000
- Pat Healy: $22,500 (includes $5,000 win bonus) def. Carlos Fodor: $12,000
- Ryan Couture: $10,000 (no win bonus) def. Conor Heun: $8,000

== See also ==
- Miesha Tate vs. Ronda Rousey
