= List of Strikeforce alumni =

Strikeforce was an American mixed martial arts and kickboxing organization based in San Jose, California which operated from 1985 to 2013. Live events and competitions debuted on November 7, 2009.

In early 2011, Strikeforce was purchased by American Ultimate Fighting Championship owner Zuffa, which eventually closed the promotion and brought the remaining fighter contracts into the UFC roster.

Former Strikeforce employees are shown below in order by weight class.

== Alumni ==
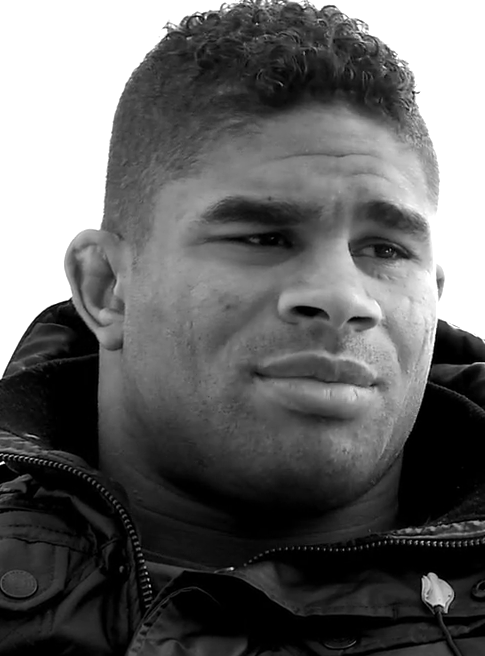
Alistair Overeem

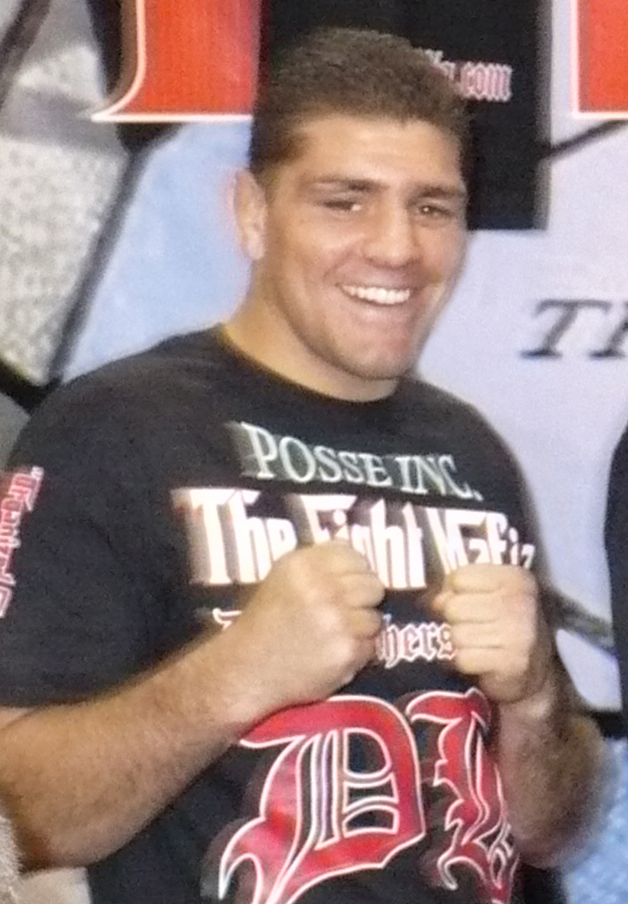
Nick Diaz

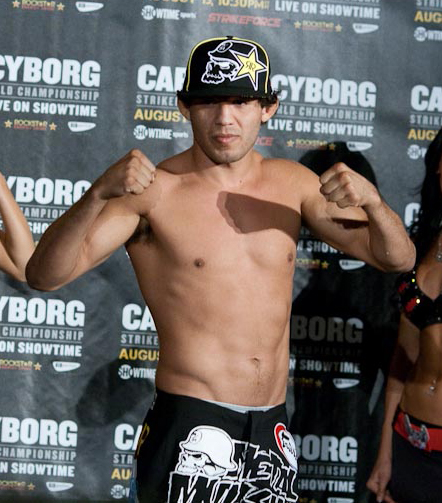
Gilbert Melendez

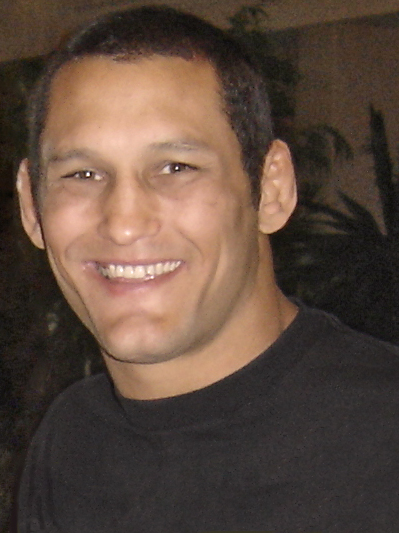
Dan Henderson

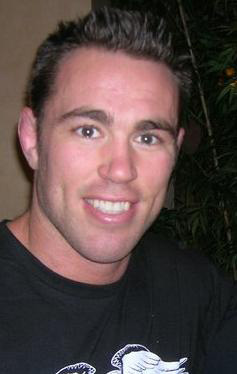
Jake Shields

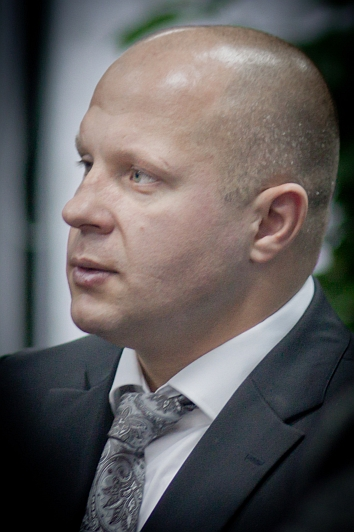
Fedor Emelianenko

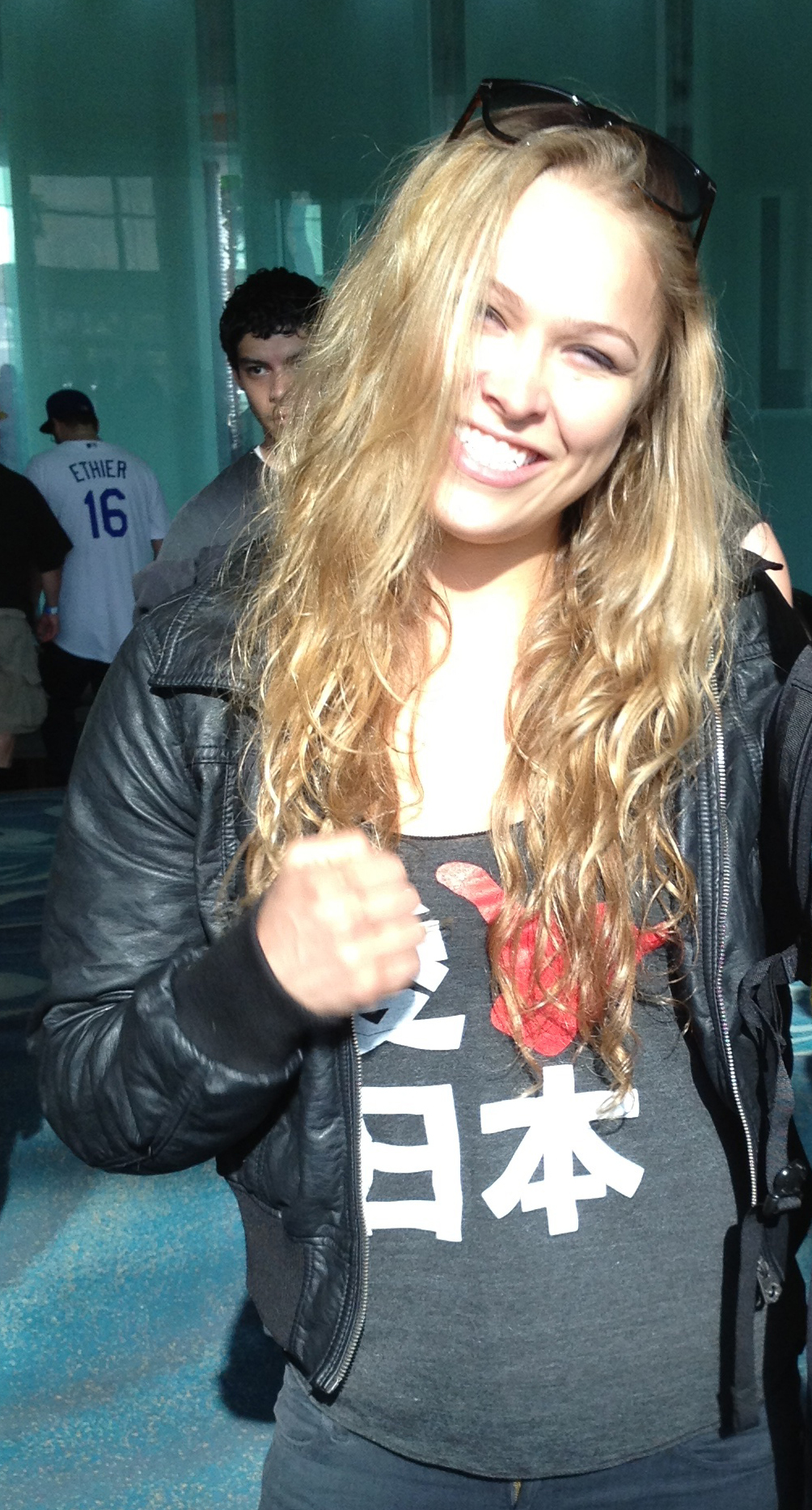
Ronda Rousey

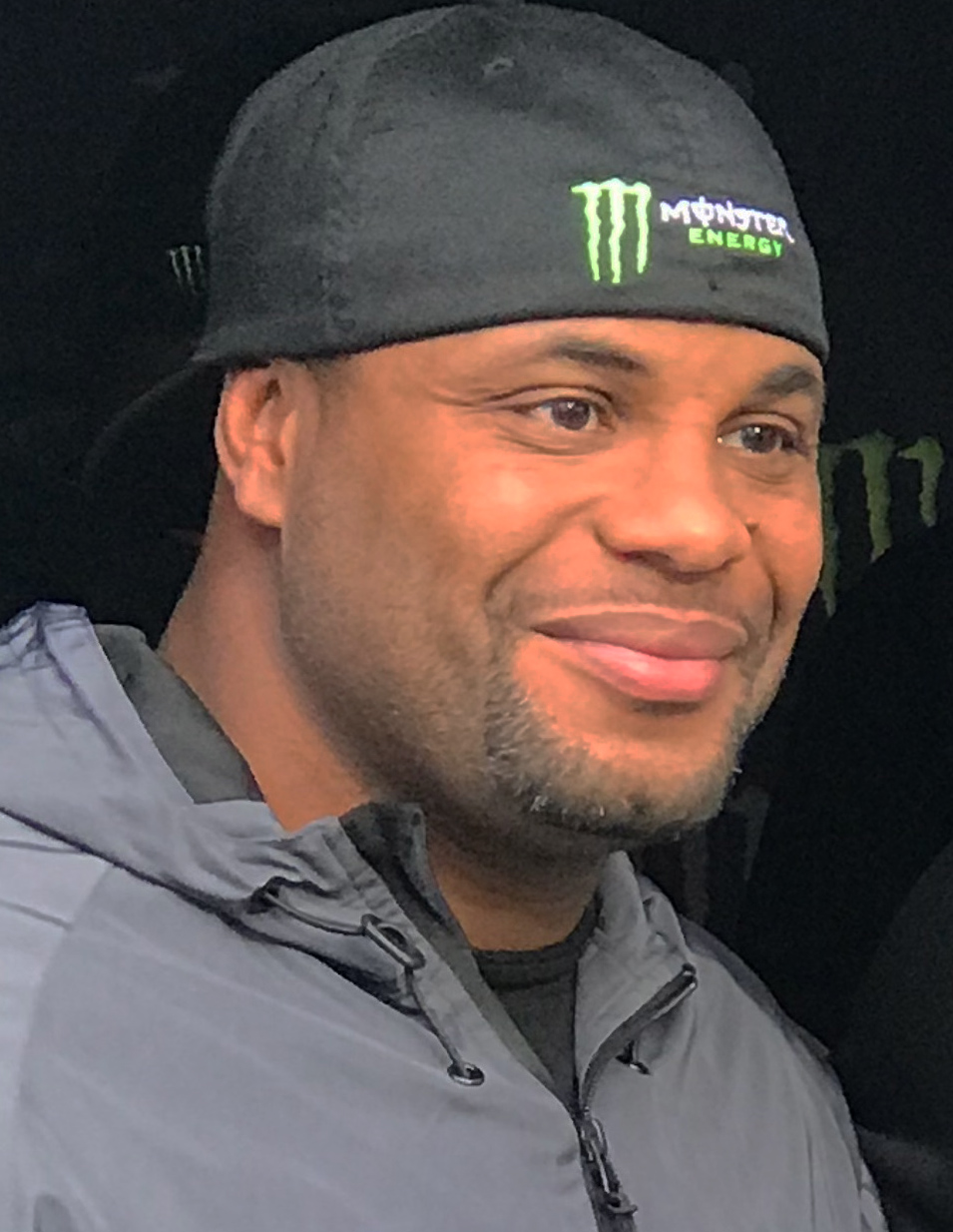
Daniel Cormier

	Name	Weight class	Strikeforce record	Ref
United States	Daniel Cormier	Heavyweight	8–0	
Netherlands	Alistair Overeem	Heavyweight	4–0	
United States	Daniel Puder	Heavyweight	4–0	
United States	Chad Griggs	Heavyweight	3–0	
United States	Herschel Walker	Heavyweight	2–0	
United States	Cain Velasquez	Heavyweight	1–0	
Brazil	Fabrício Werdum	Heavyweight	3–1	
United States	Josh Barnett	Heavyweight	3–1	
Brazil	Antônio Silva	Heavyweight	3–2	
United States	Lavar Johnson	Heavyweight	3–2	
United States	Brett Rogers	Heavyweight	2–3	
Russia	Fedor Emelianenko	Heavyweight	1–3	
United States	Bobby Lashley	Heavyweight	1–1	
Russia	Sergei Kharitonov	Heavyweight	1–1	
Netherlands	Valentijn Overeem	Heavyweight	1–1	
New Zealand	Ray Sefo	Heavyweight	1–1	
Belarus	Andrei Arlovski	Heavyweight	0–3	
United States	Jeff Monson	Heavyweight	0–1	
Cuba	Yoel Romero	Light Heavyweight	0–1	
United States	Mike Kyle	Heavyweight; Light Heavyweight	3–4–1 (1)	
United States	Ovince Saint Preux	Light Heavyweight	6–1	
Netherlands	Gegard Mousasi	Light Heavyweight	4–1–1	
Brazil	Rafael Cavalcante	Light Heavyweight	4–2 (1)	
United States	Bobby Southworth	Light Heavyweight	3–2 (1)	
United States	Muhammed Lawal	Light Heavyweight	3–1 (1)	
Brazil	Renato Sobral	Light Heavyweight	2–2	
United States	Scott Lighty	Light Heavyweight	1–2	
Cameroon	Rameau Thierry Sokoudjou	Light Heavyweight	0–1	
United States	James Irvin	Light Heavyweight	0–0 (1)	
United States	Lorenz Larkin	Light Heavyweight; Middleweight	4–0 (1)	
Brazil	Roger Gracie	Light Heavyweight; Middleweight	4–1	
United States	Dan Henderson	Light Heavyweight; Middleweight	3–1	
United States	Antwain Britt	Light Heavyweight; Middleweight	1–3	
United States	Keith Jardine	Light Heavyweight; Middleweight	0–2–1	
United States	Luke Rockhold	Middleweight	9–0	
United States	Jake Shields	Middleweight	3–0	
Brazil	Ronaldo Souza	Middleweight	7–1	
(South Vietnam)	Cung Le	Middleweight	7–1	
Russia	Adlan Amagov	Middleweight	3–1	
United States	Derek Brunson	Middleweight	3–1	
United States	Tim Kennedy	Middleweight	6–2	
United States	Robbie Lawler	Middleweight	3–5	
United States	Anthony Smith	Middleweight	2–2	
United States	Frank Shamrock	Middleweight	2–2	
United States	Lumumba Sayers	Middleweight	2–2	
United States	Jason Miller	Middleweight	1–1	
United States	Shamar Bailey	Middleweight	1–1	
United States	Louis Taylor	Middleweight	0–2	
United States	Joe Riggs	Middleweight; Welterweight	4–3	
United States	Scott Smith	Middleweight; Welterweight	3–5	
Brazil	Evangelista Santos	Middleweight; Welterweight	1–3	
United States	Jesse Taylor	Middleweight; Welterweight	0–2	
United States	Phil Baroni	Middleweight; Welterweight	0–2	
United States	Nick Diaz	Welterweight	6–0	
United States	Jay Hieron	Welterweight	2–0	
United States	Michael Chandler	Welterweight	2–0	
United States	Tyron Woodley	Welterweight	8–1	
Belgium	Tarec Saffiedine	Welterweight	6–1	
United States	Nah-Shon Burrell	Welterweight	3–1	
Canada	Jordan Mein	Welterweight	2–1	
England	Paul Daley	Welterweight	2–3	
United States	Nate Marquardt	Welterweight	1–1	
Lithuania	Marius Žaromskis	Welterweight	0–2 (1)	
United States	Isaac Vallie-Flagg	Welterweight; Lightweight	2–0	
United States	James Terry	Welterweight; Lightweight	6–4	
United States	K. J. Noons	Welterweight; Lightweight	3–4	
United States	Nate Diaz	Lightweight	1–0	
United States	Gilbert Melendez	Lightweight	11–1	
United States	Pat Healy	Lightweight	7–1	
United States	Ryan Couture	Lightweight	6–1	
United States	Caros Fodor	Lightweight	5–1	
United States	Jorge Masvidal	Lightweight	5–1	
United States	Bobby Green	Lightweight	4–1	
United States	Josh Thomson	Lightweight	10–3	
United States	Billy Evangelista	Lightweight	7–2 (1)	
United States	Justin Wilcox	Lightweight	5–3–1	
Brazil	Jorge Gurgel	Lightweight	2–4	
United States	Clay Guida	Lightweight	1–1	
Japan	Shinya Aoki	Lightweight	1–1	
Brazil	Gesias Cavalcante	Lightweight	1–2–1	
United States	Conor Heun	Lightweight	1–3	
United States	Cris Cyborg	Women's Featherweight	4–0 (1)	
United States	Gina Carano	Women's Featherweight	1–1	
Netherlands	Marloes Coenen	Women's Featherweight; Women's Bantamweight	3–2	
United States	Ronda Rousey	Women's Bantamweight	4–0	
United States	Miesha Tate	Women's Bantamweight	6–2	
Canada	Sarah Kaufman	Women's Bantamweight	6–2	

== See also ==
- List of Strikeforce champions
- List of Strikeforce events
