= Strikeforce: Melendez vs. Healy =

Strikeforce mixed martial arts event in 2012

- The poster for Strikeforce: Melendez vs. Healy
- Promotion: Strikeforce
- Date: Cancelled
- Venue: Power Balance Pavilion
- City: Sacramento, California, United States

Event chronology
Strikeforce: Rousey vs. Kaufman	Strikeforce: Melendez vs. Healy	Strikeforce: Cormier vs. Mir

Strikeforce: Melendez vs. Healy was a planned mixed martial arts event that was to be held by Strikeforce. The event would have taken place on September 29, 2012 at the Power Balance Pavilion in Sacramento, California.

== Cancellation ==
On September 23, 2012, Strikeforce announced it was cancelling this event, as Showtime opted to not air it following lightweight champion Gilbert Melendez suffering a knee injury in training, taking him out of a planned title defense against Pat Healy. Strikeforce CEO Scott Coker stated, "Without a television partner, we simply could not move forward with this event. We wish Gilbert a speedy recovery and will work diligently and quickly to reschedule the fighters affected by this news on upcoming cards."

The Melendez/Healy and Payan/Bravo bouts were both rescheduled for Strikeforce: Marquardt vs. Saffiedine on January 12, 2013, where Estevan Payan defeated Michael Bravo by second round TKO. However, Gilbert Melendez was replaced by Jorge Masvidal, and later, Kurt Holobaugh in the planned bout with Pat Healy due to injuries.

The proposed bout between Nah-Shon Burrell & Yuri Villefort was rescheduled for UFC 157 on February 23, 2013 following both fighters' signings with the UFC after the closure of Strikeforce in January 2013. Burrell defeated Villefort via unanimous decision.

== Cancelled fight card ==
=== Preliminary card (Showtime Extreme) ===
- Lightweight bout: Estevan Payan vs. Michael Bravo
- Light Heavyweight bout: Mike Kyle vs. Dion Staring
- Welterweight bout: Nah-Shon Burrell vs. Yuri Villefort
- Women's Bantamweight bout: Amanda Nunes vs. Cat Zingano
- Lightweight bout: Jorge Gurgel vs. Mizuto Hirota

=== Main card (Showtime) ===
- Lightweight bout: Josh Thomson vs. Caros Fodor
- Light Heavyweight bout: Gian Villante vs. Guto Inocente
- Lightweight bout: Isaac Vallie-Flagg vs. Adriano Martins
- Welterweight bout: Jorge Santiago vs. Quinn Mulhern
- Lightweight Championship bout: Gilbert Melendez (c) vs. Pat Healy
