= Conor Heun =

American martial artist

- Born: February 11, 1979 (age 47); Boulder, Colorado, United States
- Other names: Hurricane
- Height: 5 ft 10 in (1.78 m)
- Weight: 155 lb (70 kg; 11.1 st)
- Division: Welterweight; Lightweight
- Stance: Orthodox
- Fighting out of: Boulder, Colorado
- Team: 10th Planet Jiu-Jitsu
- Years active: 2006-2012

Mixed martial arts record
- Total: 14
- Wins: 9
- By knockout: 1
- By submission: 5
- By decision: 3
- Losses: 5
- By knockout: 1
- By decision: 4

Other information
- Website: www.conorheun.com
- Mixed martial arts record from Sherdog

Conor Heun (born February 11, 1979) is a retired American mixed martial artist. A professional from 2006 until 2012, he competed for Strikeforce, EliteXC, and the Los Angeles Anacondas of the International Fight League.

== Mixed martial arts career ==
=== EliteXC ===
Heun made his Television debut on a ShoXC card against Marlon Mathias. Mathais broke Heun's jaw a minute and a half into the first round with a knee, but Heun kept fighting and won the close fight via majority decision. His next fight was a second-round TKO stoppage of James Edson Berto.

=== Strikeforce ===
Heun made his Strikeforce debut against former UFC fighter Jorge Gurgel on a ShoMMA card in June 2009. He lost the fight via decision.

After a year off due to injury, he returned to the promotion on the Strikeforce: Los Angeles card. He faced boxer and former EliteXC lightweight champion K. J. Noons and lost via split decision.

Conor fought Magno Almeida on the Strikeforce: Overeem vs. Werdum undercard, and won in a unanimous decision, though Almeida dislocated Conor's elbow.

Heun faced Ryan Couture at Strikeforce: Tate vs. Rousey on March 3, 2012. He lost the fight via TKO in the third round.

== Personal life ==
Heun studied English literature, journalism, and organizational communications learning and design at Ithaca College. He now runs and coaches at the Denver affiliate of 10th Planet Jiu-Jitsu.

== Mixed martial arts record ==
Professional record breakdown
14 matches	9 wins	5 losses
By knockout	1	1
By submission	3	0
By decision	5	4

Res.	Record	Opponent	Method	Event	Date	Round	Time	Location	Notes
Loss	9–5	Ryan Couture	TKO (punches)	Strikeforce: Tate vs. Rousey	March 3, 2012	3	2:52	Columbus, Ohio, United States	
Win	9–4	Magno Almeida	Decision (unanimous)	Strikeforce: Overeem vs. Werdum	June 18, 2011	3	5:00	Dallas, Texas, United States	
Loss	8–4	K. J. Noons	Decision (split)	Strikeforce: Los Angeles	June 16, 2010	3	5:00	Los Angeles, California, United States	Catchweight (160 lbs) bout.
Loss	8–3	Jorge Gurgel	Decision (unanimous)	Strikeforce Challengers: Villasenor vs. Cyborg	June 19, 2009	3	5:00	Kent, Washington, United States	Catchweight (158 lbs) bout.
Win	8–2	James Edson Berto	TKO (punches and elbows)	EliteXC: Heat	October 4, 2008	2	2:18	Sunrise, Florida, United States	
Win	7–2	Marlon Mathias	Decision (majority)	ShoXC: Elite Challenger Series	March 21, 2008	3	5:00	Santa Ynez, California, United States	
Win	6–2	Noah Shinable	Submission (armbar)	OctoberFist 2007: Fight Night on Fright Night	October 31, 2007	1	1:17	Orange County, California, United States	
Loss	5–2	LC Davis	Decision (split)	International Fight League	August 2, 2007	3	4:00	East Rutherford, New Jersey, United States	
Win	5–1	Tristan Wit	Submission (armbar)	IFL: Everett	June 1, 2007	1	3:59	Everett, Washington, United States	
Win	4–1	Gilbert Salinas	Submission (D'arce choke)	Total Fighting Alliance 6	April 28, 2007	1	1:37	Santa Monica, California, United States	
Win	3–1	Clint Coronel	Decision (split)	IFL: Los Angeles	March 17, 2007	3	4:00	Los Angeles, California, United States	
Win	2–1	Jonathan Pastrana	Submission (guillotine choke)	TFA 5: Conflict on the Coast	February 24, 2007	2	1:23	Santa Monica, California, United States	Return to Lightweight.
Loss	1–1	Brett Cooper	Decision (split)	TFA 4: Fight Night on Fright Night	November 3, 2006	3	5:00	Carson, California, United States	Welterweight debut.
Win	1–0	Martin Hench	Submission (rear naked choke)	PF 1: The Beginning	May 12, 2006	2	0:46	Hollywood, California, United States	

== See also ==
- List of Strikeforce alumni
