= Ryan Couture =

American mixed martial arts fighter (born 1982)

- Born: Ryan Duane Couture; August 27, 1982 (age 44); Edmonds, Washington, United States
- Nationality: American
- Height: 5 ft 10 in (1.78 m)
- Weight: 168.8 lb (76.6 kg; 12.06 st)
- Division: Lightweight; Welterweight
- Reach: 76 1/2 in (194 cm)
- Stance: Orthodox
- Team: Xtreme Couture
- Years active: 2009–present

Mixed martial arts record
- Total: 18
- Wins: 12
- By knockout: 1
- By submission: 6
- By decision: 5
- Losses: 6
- By knockout: 3
- By submission: 1
- By decision: 2

Other information
- Notable relatives: Randy Couture (father)
- Mixed martial arts record from Sherdog

Ryan Duane Couture (born August 27, 1982) is an American former professional mixed martial artist who most recently competed in the Welterweight division of Bellator MMA. A professional competitor since 2009, he has formerly competed for the UFC and Strikeforce. He is the son of UFC Hall of Famer Randy Couture.

== Biography ==
Couture grew up in Woodinville, Washington, and attended Woodinville High School. During his senior year, Couture placed third in the Washington State 4A wrestling championship. Couture attended Western Washington University from 2000 until 2004 and graduated with a degree in mathematics.

== Mixed martial arts career ==
Couture began fighting in 2009 and compiled a 5–1–1 record as an amateur.

=== Strikeforce ===
He made his professional debut at Strikeforce Challengers: Riggs vs. Taylor on August 13, 2010. He debuted in the Strikeforce promotion's lightweight division, defeating Lucas Stark via triangle choke in the first round.

Couture was scheduled to fight Juan Zapata on November 19, 2010, however he was forced to withdraw because of a staph infection.

Couture fought at Strikeforce Challengers: Beerbohm vs. Healy against Lee Higgins and won the bout via rear-naked choke in the 3rd round. The victory over Higgins upped Couture's professional record to 2–0, with both fights coming under the Strikeforce banner.

In his next fight, Couture faced Matt Ricehouse at Strikeforce Challengers: Fodor vs. Terry. He lost via unanimous decision.

Couture rebounded from the first loss of his career when he defeated Maka Watson via majority decision at Strikeforce Challengers: Larkin vs. Rossborough.

Couture next faced Conor Heun at Strikeforce: Tate vs. Rousey on March 3, 2012. He defeated Heun by TKO at 2:52 in the third round.

In his sixth Strikeforce appearance, Couture faced Joe Duarte on July 14, 2012, at Strikeforce: Rockhold vs. Kennedy. He won the fight via split decision.

Having spent his entire professional career in the Strikeforce promotion, Couture was featured on their final show as he faced former EliteXC World Lightweight Champion. K. J. Noons at Strikeforce: Marquardt vs. Saffiedine on January 12, 2013. Despite being outstruck by Noons in each round, Couture was awarded a split decision victory.

=== Ultimate Fighting Championship ===
Following a signing of his father Randy to Bellator as an on-screen, non-fighting personality, UFC president Dana White, was questioned about what type of relationship Couture now had with the UFC, as White was quite upset at a perceived betrayal by Randy. White made it clear that Couture is welcome in the UFC, and that he will not be punished for his father's relationship with him. However, White did state that Randy would not be allowed to corner his son at UFC events.

In his UFC debut, Couture faced Ross Pearson on April 6, 2013, at UFC on Fuel TV 9. Couture lost the bout via TKO in the second round.

Couture was expected to face Quinn Mulhern in a lightweight bout on August 31, 2013, at UFC 164. However, Mulhern pulled out of the bout in mid-July citing an injury and was replaced by Al Iaquinta. He lost the bout via unanimous decision. After back to back losses he was released from the UFC.

=== Independent promotions ===
Couture returned to the cage on the smaller circuit and he has since rattled off 2 straight victories, both being finishes defeating Kyle Sjafiroeddin by rear naked choke in the first round on January 18, 2014 at Battlegrounds MMA 3. Then defeating Shakir McKillip with the same method early in the second round on May 17, 2014 at Battlegrounds MMA 4.

=== Bellator MMA ===
On July 27, 2014, Couture signed with Bellator MMA.

Couture made his promotional debut against Tom Bagnasco at Bellator 124 on September 12, 2014. He won the fight via rear-naked choke submission in the first round.

Couture faced Dakota Cochrane at Bellator 135 on March 27, 2015. He won the bout via a rear-naked choke submission in the first round.

Couture was scheduled to face Nick Gonzalez on September 25, 2015, at Bellator 143. However, Gonzalez weighed in at 172.75 pounds, over sixteen pounds past the lightweight limit, and the fight was cancelled.

Couture was expected to face Derek Anderson at Bellator 148 on January 29, 2016. However, Anderson was injured and replaced by Patricky Pitbull. Couture lost the bout via knockout in the first round.

Couture faced Goiti Yamauchi at Bellator 162 on October 21, 2016. He lost the fight via submission just over a minute into the first round.

Couture faced Haim Gozali in a welterweight bout at Bellator 180 on June 24, 2017. He won the fight via unanimous decision.

Couture faced Saad Awad at Bellator 201 on June 29, 2018. He lost the bout via technical knockout in the first round.

Couture faced Haim Gozali in a rematch at Bellator 209 on November 16, 2018. He won the bout via unanimous decision.

== Personal life ==
Couture currently lives in Las Vegas, Nevada and trains at the Xtreme Couture gym. He got married in Las Vegas, NV in October 2014. He and his wife had a son in May 2021.

In 2020, he announced that he had been appointed to be his father's successor as the CEO of Xtreme Couture. In the same interview Ryan mentioned that he is most likely retired from professional mixed martial arts competition.

== Mixed martial arts record ==
Professional record breakdown
18 matches	12 wins	6 losses
By knockout	1	3
By submission	6	1
By decision	5	2

Res.	Record	Opponent	Method	Event	Date	Round	Time	Location	Notes
Win	12–6	Haim Gozali	Decision (unanimous)	Bellator 209	November 16, 2018	3	5:00	Tel Aviv, Israel	
Loss	11–6	Saad Awad	TKO (punches)	Bellator 201	June 29, 2018	1	4:29	Temecula, California, United States	
Win	11–5	Haim Gozali	Decision (unanimous)	Bellator 180	June 24, 2017	3	5:00	New York City, New York, United States	Welterweight debut.
Loss	10–5	Goiti Yamauchi	Submission (armbar)	Bellator 162	October 21, 2016	1	1:01	Memphis, Tennessee, United States	
Loss	10–4	Patricky Pitbull	KO (punch)	Bellator 148	January 29, 2016	1	3:00	Fresno, California, United States	
Win	10–3	Dakota Cochrane	Submission (rear-naked choke)	Bellator 135	March 27, 2015	1	3:23	Thackerville, Oklahoma, United States	
Win	9–3	Tom Bagnasco	Submission (rear-naked choke)	Bellator 124	September 12, 2014	1	3:01	Plymouth Township, Michigan, United States	
Win	8–3	Shakir McKillip	Submission (rear-naked choke)	Battlegrounds MMA 4	May 17, 2014	2	1:34	Enid, Oklahoma, United States	
Win	7–3	Kyle Sjafiroeddin	Submission (rear-naked choke)	Battlegrounds MMA 3	January 18, 2014	1	2:14	Norman, Oklahoma, United States	
Loss	6–3	Al Iaquinta	Decision (unanimous)	UFC 164	August 31, 2013	3	5:00	Milwaukee, Wisconsin, United States	
Loss	6–2	Ross Pearson	TKO (punches)	UFC on Fuel TV: Mousasi vs. Latifi	April 6, 2013	2	3:45	Stockholm, Sweden	
Win	6–1	K. J. Noons	Decision (split)	Strikeforce: Marquardt vs. Saffiedine	January 12, 2013	3	5:00	Oklahoma City, Oklahoma, United States	
Win	5–1	Joe Duarte	Decision (split)	Strikeforce: Rockhold vs. Kennedy	July 14, 2012	3	5:00	Portland, Oregon, United States	
Win	4–1	Conor Heun	TKO (punches)	Strikeforce: Tate vs. Rousey	March 3, 2012	3	2:52	Columbus, Ohio, United States	
Win	3–1	Maka Watson	Decision (majority)	Strikeforce Challengers: Larkin vs. Rossborough	September 23, 2011	3	5:00	Las Vegas, Nevada, United States	
Loss	2–1	Matt Ricehouse	Decision (unanimous)	Strikeforce Challengers: Fodor vs. Terry	June 24, 2011	3	5:00	Kent, Washington, United States	
Win	2–0	Lee Higgins	Submission (rear-naked choke)	Strikeforce Challengers: Beerbohm vs. Healy	February 18, 2011	3	4:41	Cedar Park, Texas, United States	
Win	1–0	Lucas Stark	Submission (triangle choke)	Strikeforce Challengers: Riggs vs. Taylor	August 13, 2010	1	1:15	Phoenix, Arizona, United States	

== See also ==
- List of Strikeforce alumni
