= K.J. Noons =

American mixed martial arts fighter

- Born: Karl James Noons; December 7, 1982 (age 43); Kailua-Kona, Hawaii, U.S.
- Other names: King
- Height: 5 ft 11 in (180 cm)
- Weight: 168 lb (76 kg; 12 st 0 lb)
- Division: Lightweight; Welterweight; Middleweight
- Reach: 72 in (180 cm)
- Style: Boxing, kickboxing, Sanda
- Stance: Orthodox
- Fighting out of: San Diego, California, United States
- Team: Alliance MMA; City Boxing
- Rank: Black belt in Kenpō Karate under Ed Parker
- Years active: 2000–2016

Professional boxing record
- Total: 13
- Wins: 11
- By knockout: 5
- Losses: 2

Kickboxing record
- Total: 14
- Wins: 12
- By knockout: 9
- Losses: 2

Mixed martial arts record
- Total: 23
- Wins: 13
- By knockout: 9
- By decision: 4
- Losses: 9
- By knockout: 1
- By submission: 2
- By decision: 6
- No contests: 1

Other information
- Spouse: Melany (2011–present)
- Children: Karl James Jr. (b. 2012)
- Notable school: Clements High School
- Boxing record from BoxRec
- Mixed martial arts record from Sherdog

K.J. Noons
Medal record

Representing United States

Men's Karate

Long Beach International Karate Championships
Gold medal – first place	1997	17 and under Kenpō (Black)

Karl James Noons (born December 7, 1982) is a retired American professional mixed martial artist, as well as a former professional boxer and kickboxer. Noons competed for UFC, Strikeforce, DREAM and EliteXC. He is the former EliteXC Lightweight Champion and former Strikeforce title challenger.

== Background ==
KJ Noons is hapa—mixed ethnicity of native Hawaiian (from his mother's side) and European-American (from his father's side). Born and raised in Kailua-Kona, Hawaii, Noons comes from a family history of fighting. His father Karl was a professional kickboxer and was a top contender during the time he fought. Karl's passion for fighting and competing in combat sports influenced him to introduce his son to martial arts at a young age. At the age of five, Noons started training in martial arts. Often getting disqualified for fighting too hard in karate tournaments, Noons eventually started training in boxing and Muay Thai at the age of eight out of interest for full contact fighting. Noons competed as an amateur fighter and became the first student in the state of Hawaii to earn a junior black belt under Ed Parker at the age of 11. During his high school years, Noons moved to Houston, Texas, due to the location of his father's job. While continuing to compete as a fighter, he also started playing football at Clements High School. At age 17, Noons won the ISKA Super Middleweight International Championship as an amateur in Sanshou. After winning the title and graduating from Clements High School, K.J. decided to pursue a career in combat sports, rather than go to college and continue with football.

== Mixed martial arts career ==
=== PRIDE, ICON Sport, and SuperBrawl ===
In 2005, Noons won the PRIDE Fighting Championship's "Best Striker" auditions. Although, he never fought for the promotion, he fought for PRIDE's subleased promotion called SuperBrawl. Noons chose not to fight for PRIDE Fighting Championships because the promoters wanted to feature him in bouts against the top lightweights in the world, such as PRIDE's reigning Lightweight Champion, Takanori Gomi, and top contender, Joachim Hansen. Noons felt he was not ready to compete at the highest level that early in his career and chose a more conservative route. After three combined wins under the ICON Sport and SuperBrawl banner, Noons would move on to compete in bigger promotions.

=== Elite Xtreme Combat ===
In 2006, Noons signed a deal with promoter Gary Shaw that allowed him to participate in both boxing and mixed martial arts. Soon after, Noons was set to face former PRIDE veteran Charles Bennett in EliteXC's inaugural event in February 2007. Bennett won the bout via KO three minutes and forty-three seconds into round one, giving Noons only the second loss of his professional mixed martial arts career.

Noons rebounded from his loss to Bennett with a KO win over James Edson Berto at EliteXC's first ShoXC event. He then faced Nick Diaz for the promotion's first ever lightweight championship at EliteXC: Renegade. Noons dominated the fight using his outstanding boxing and striking against the Brazilian jiu-jitsu expert. Diaz attempted to take the fight to the ground but was unsuccessful with his takedown attempts and was also countered with a knee strike to the face on one occasion. Midway through the first round, Diaz was finally successful with a take down, but Noons got back to his feet instantly. Moments later, the referee would halt the fight and send Diaz to his corner to check on his cuts over his right eye. Diaz was given the o.k. and continued to fight. Noons would keep the fight standing and dropped Diaz with a straight right punch around the 2:07 mark of the round. After round one ended, the doctors in Diaz's corner stopped the fight due to how badly his face was cut. Noons was then declared the winner of the fight by way of TKO due to cuts, and would become the new EliteXC Lightweight Champion.

On June 14, 2008, Noons was successful in his first and only title defense with a TKO win over Yves Edwards in Hawaii at EliteXC: Return of the King. Following the fight, Nick Diaz, who fought on the event's co-main event, stepped into the cage to confront Noons for a rematch during K.J.'s post-fight interview with Bill Goldberg. After Noons asked the fans if Diaz deserved the rematch, Diaz grabbed a hold of Goldberg's microphone and said "Don't be scared homie", which resulted in an in-cage brawl. About two months later, Noons would be stripped of the title for refusing to rematch with Diaz. The promotion would then go defunct before a new champion could be crowned.

=== Strikeforce and DREAM ===
On December 2, 2009, Noons signed with mixed martial arts promotion, Strikeforce. While Noons was still competing in professional kickboxing as a teenager, he previously fought for Strikeforce on their kickboxing fight cards before Strikeforce became a mixed martial arts promotion in 2006.

In March 2010, Noons made his Japanese debut as he represented Strikeforce at DREAM 13. In his first MMA fight in nearly two years, Noons defeated Andre Amade via unanimous decision. Noons was the aggressor for the duration of the fight, and was visibly frustrated with Amade's uncharacteristically tentative fighting style throughout the fight, which seemed to be based on a counter punching technique.

Noons was set to make his Strikeforce debut against undefeated prospect Billy Evangelista at Strikeforce: Miami, but the fight was withdrawn after Evangelista suffered an undisclosed injury during training.

Noons would then be scheduled to compete in a rematch against Charles Bennett at Strikeforce: Fedor vs. Werdum. After Bennett pulled out of the fight due to scheduling conflicts, Noons was rescheduled to face Conor Heun at Strikeforce: Los Angeles in a catchweight bout of 160 pounds, which would take place ten days before the date he was originally set to rematch Bennett. Noons would go on to win a closely contested fight by split decision.

Noons next faced Jorge Gurgel on August 21, 2010, at Strikeforce: Houston. At the weigh-ins, the day before the bout with Gurgel, Noons weighed in at 156.25 pounds, a quarter of a pound over the maximum weight limit. Gurgel accepted the fight and waived off the extra weight, so the fight was continued as a lightweight bout. As the final seconds of the first round were coming to an end, Gurgel threw a flurry of punches while Noons responded with a left hook that landed and dropped Gurgel just a split second after the bell sounded at the end of the round. The crowd reacted to what appeared to be a late punch while a wobbled Gurgel was struggling to find his corner. Right at the opening bell for round two, Noons landed a right hand followed by a left hook that dropped Gurgel to the canvas once again. Noons looked to the referee expecting a stoppage and received no response. As Noons then continued to land punches on Gurgel, he threw a knee that appeared to land to the head of a still downed opponent, finally prompting the referee to stop the fight. Replay showed that the knee Noons threw did not land, although Noons's foot tapped Gurgel on the chin as it followed through. Noons was declared the winner by TKO at 0:19 of round two.

Noons moved up one weight class to fight Nick Diaz in a grudge rematch for the Strikeforce Welterweight Championship on October 9, 2010. Noons and Diaz previously fought at EliteXC: Renegade where Noons won by TKO due to cuts. Noons lost by unanimous decision (48–47, 49–47, 49–46), giving Noons his third career loss and first loss by decision, and beginning a losing streak for years to come. After the fight Noons revealed that he had sustained a broken jaw in the first round and a broken hand in the second.

Noons faced Jorge Masvidal at Strikeforce: Overeem vs. Werdum. Noons-Masvidal was set as a lightweight title eliminator, which would grant the winner of the bout a title shot against reigning Strikeforce Lightweight Champion, Gilbert Melendez. Originally headlining the preliminary card on HDNet, the bout was promoted to the Showtime portion of the main card after women's MMA superstar, Gina Carano, was pulled from the card. Noons went on to lose a unanimous decision.

Noons then faced Billy Evangelista at Strikeforce: Melendez vs. Masvidal in December 2011. He won the fight via unanimous decision.

Noons next faced Josh Thomson in the co-main event at Strikeforce: Tate vs. Rousey in March 2012. He lost the fight via unanimous decision.

Noons returned to face Ryan Couture at the final Strikeforce event, Strikeforce: Marquardt vs. Saffiedine, on January 12, 2013. Noons lost the fight via highly controversial split decision. All but one media outlet scored the fight for Noons, with a majority giving him every round. Couture admitted to being surprised by the verdict. Despite the loss, Noons still moved over to the UFC.

=== Ultimate Fighting Championship ===
In January 2013, the Strikeforce organization was closed by its parent company Zuffa. A list of fighters scheduled to be brought over to the Ultimate Fighting Championship was released in mid-January and Noons was one of the fighters listed.

In his UFC debut, Noons faced Donald Cerrone on May 25, 2013, at UFC 160. He lost the fight via unanimous decision.

In his second UFC fight, Noons faced George Sotiropoulos on October 19, 2013, at UFC 166. He won via unanimous decision, earning his first win under the UFC banner.

Noons faced Sam Stout in a welterweight bout on April 16, 2014, at The Ultimate Fighter Nations Finale. Noons won the fight via knockout in the first round, earning him his first Performance of the Night bonus award.

Noons next faced Daron Cruickshank on December 12, 2014, at The Ultimate Fighter 20 Finale. After a back-and-forth first round, the fight was stopped in the second round when Cruickshank received a second inadvertent eye poke from Noons and was unable to continue. Because they had not reached the third round, the fight was declared a No Contest.

Noons was expected to face Yan Cabral at UFC Fight Night 67. However, Cabral was forced out of the bout after contracting Dengue Fever and replaced by Alex Oliveira. Noons lost the fight via submission in the first round.

Noons faced Josh Burkman on February 6, 2016, at UFC Fight Night 82. He lost the fight by unanimous decision.

Noons was released by the company on April 14, 2016.

== Personal life ==
Noons is married to professional model Melany.

Noons' first name comes from his father's first name, while his middle name comes from his grandfather's middle name.

In 2010 Noons participated in a PETA ad campaign speaking out against animal cruelty and encouraging people to report animal abuse to authorities.

== Championships and accomplishments ==
=== Mixed martial arts ===
- Ultimate Fighting Championship
  - Performance of the Night (one time) vs. Sam Stout
- Strikeforce
  - 2010 Fight of the Year vs. Nick Diaz on October 9
- Elite Xtreme Combat
  - EliteXC Lightweight Championship (one time, first, last)
    - One successful title defense
- PRIDE Fighting Championships
  - 2005 U.S. Auditions winner
- Renegades Extreme Fighting
  - REF 2002 Lightweight Tournament runner-up

=== Sanshou ===
- Art of War-K. Superstar Production
  - Art of War Sanshou Middleweight Championship (one time)
- U.S. Open International Martial Arts Championships
  - U.S. Open Sanshou International Middleweight Championship (one time)
- International Sport Karate Association
  - ISKA Amateur Sanshou International Super Middleweight Championship (one time)

=== Karate ===
- Long Beach International Karate Championships
  - 1997 17 and Under Kenpō Black Belt gold medalist

== Mixed martial arts record ==
Professional record breakdown
23 matches	13 wins	9 losses
By knockout	9	1
By submission	0	2
By decision	4	6
No contests	1	

Res.	Record	Opponent	Method	Event	Date	Round	Time	Location	Notes
Loss	13–9 (1)	Josh Burkman	Decision (unanimous)	UFC Fight Night: Hendricks vs. Thompson	February 6, 2016	3	5:00	Las Vegas, Nevada, United States	
Loss	13–8 (1)	Alex Oliveira	Submission (rear-naked choke)	UFC Fight Night: Condit vs. Alves	May 30, 2015	1	2:51	Goiânia, Brazil	Welterweight bout.
NC	13–7 (1)	Daron Cruickshank	NC (accidental eye poke)	The Ultimate Fighter: A Champion Will Be Crowned Finale	December 12, 2014	2	0:25	Las Vegas, Nevada, United States	Cruickshank was rendered unable to continue.
Win	13–7	Sam Stout	KO (punches)	The Ultimate Fighter Nations Finale: Bisping vs. Kennedy	April 16, 2014	1	0:30	Quebec City, Quebec, Canada	Welterweight bout. Performance of the Night.
Win	12–7	George Sotiropoulos	Decision (unanimous)	UFC 166	October 19, 2013	3	5:00	Houston, Texas, United States	
Loss	11–7	Donald Cerrone	Decision (unanimous)	UFC 160	May 25, 2013	3	5:00	Las Vegas, Nevada, United States	
Loss	11–6	Ryan Couture	Decision (split)	Strikeforce: Marquardt vs. Saffiedine	January 12, 2013	3	5:00	Oklahoma City, Oklahoma, United States	
Loss	11–5	Josh Thomson	Decision (unanimous)	Strikeforce: Tate vs. Rousey	March 3, 2012	3	5:00	Columbus, Ohio, United States	Strikeforce Lightweight title eliminator.
Win	11–4	Billy Evangelista	Decision (unanimous)	Strikeforce: Melendez vs. Masvidal	December 17, 2011	3	5:00	San Diego, California, United States	
Loss	10–4	Jorge Masvidal	Decision (unanimous)	Strikeforce: Overeem vs. Werdum	June 18, 2011	3	5:00	Dallas, Texas, United States	Strikeforce Lightweight title eliminator.
Loss	10–3	Nick Diaz	Decision (unanimous)	Strikeforce: Diaz vs. Noons II	October 9, 2010	5	5:00	San Jose, California, United States	For the Strikeforce Welterweight Championship.
Win	10–2	Jorge Gurgel	TKO (punches)	Strikeforce: Houston	August 21, 2010	2	0:19	Houston, Texas, United States	
Win	9–2	Conor Heun	Decision (split)	Strikeforce: Los Angeles	June 16, 2010	3	5:00	Los Angeles, United States	Catchweight (160 lbs) bout.
Win	8–2	Andre Amade	Decision (unanimous)	DREAM 13	March 22, 2010	2	5:00	Yokohama, Japan	Catchweight (72 kg) bout.
Win	7–2	Yves Edwards	TKO (punches and elbows)	EliteXC: Return of the King	June 14, 2008	1	0:48	Honolulu, Hawaii, United States	Defended the EliteXC Lightweight Championship.
Win	6–2	Nick Diaz	TKO (doctor stoppage)	EliteXC: Renegade	November 10, 2007	1	5:00	Corpus Christi, Texas, United States	Won the inaugural EliteXC Lightweight Championship.
Win	5–2	James Edson Berto	KO (knee)	ShoXC: Elite Challenger Series	July 27, 2007	3	0:45	Santa Ynez, California, United States	
Loss	4–2	Charles Bennett	KO (punch)	EliteXC: Destiny	February 10, 2007	1	3:43	Southaven, Mississippi, United States	
Win	4–1	Harris Sarmiento	TKO (punches)	ICON Sport 44	October 28, 2005	3	4:37	Honolulu, Hawaii, United States	
Win	3–1	Bryson Kamaka	KO (head kick)	SuperBrawl 41	July 23, 2005	1	1:20	Honolulu, Hawaii, United States	Catchweight (165 lbs) bout.
Win	2–1	Malik Williams	TKO (punches)	SuperBrawl 39	April 9, 2005	1	2:43	Honolulu, Hawaii, United States	
Loss	1–1	Buddy Clinton	Submission (heel hook)	REF 11	October 12, 2002	1	0:25	Houston, Texas, United States	REF 2002 Lightweight Tournament Final.
Win	1–0	Raul Guerra	TKO (corner stoppage)	REF 11	October 12, 2002	2	N/A	Houston, Texas, United States	REF 2002 Lightweight Tournament Semifinal.

== Professional boxing record ==
11 wins (5 knockouts, 6 decisions), 2 losses, 0 draws
Res.	Record	Opponent	Type	Rd., time	Date	Location	Notes
Win	11-2	(Mexico) Julio Perez	UD	6	2009-10-10	Arena Theatre, Houston, Texas	
Win	10-2	(United States) Randy Pogue	UD	6	2009-08-22	Pala Casino Spa and Resort, Pala, California	
Win	9-2	(United States) Enrique Gallegos	UD	6	2009-05-28	Arena Theatre, Houston, Texas	
Loss	8-2	(United States) James Countryman	UD	6	2009-03-21	(Ohio) U.S. Bank Arena, Cincinnati	
Win	8-1	(Mexico) Alejandro Bogarin	UD	6	2008-11-13	Expo Center, El Monte, California	
Win	7-1	(United States) Anthony Cannon	UD	6	2007-06-01	Chumash Casino, Santa Ynez, California	
Win	6-1	(Mexico) Roberto Estrada	TKO	2 (6), 0:55	2006-09-15	Quiet Cannon, Montebello, California	
Win	5-1	(United States) Velvet Malone	TKO	4 (4), 1:01	2006-05-19	Quiet Cannon, Montebello, California	
Loss	4-1	(Canada) Daniel Stanislavjevic	UD	6	2006-02-02	Henry Fonda Theater, Hollywood, California	
Win	4-0	(United States) Damon Franklin	TKO	3 (4), 1:24	2005-09-22	Henry Fonda Theater, Hollywood, California	
Win	3-0	(United States) Thomas Rittenbaugh	UD	4	2005-08-26	Golden Acorn Casino, Campo, California	
Win	2-0	(United States) Ray Seja	TKO	3 (4), 1:30	2005-06-17	Table Mountain Casino, Friant, California	
Win	1-0	(United States) Ernest Lesure	TKO	4 (4), 2:55	2004-06-18	Dodge Arena, Hidalgo, Texas	

== Kickboxing record ==
Kickboxing record (incomplete)
12 wins (9 (T)KOs, 3 decisions), 2 losses, 0 draws
Date	Result	Opponent	Event	Location	Method	Round	Time
September 24, 2004	Win	(United States) Cruz Chacon	Ring of Fire 13: Bring the Heat	(United States) Castle Rock, Colorado	UD	5	3:00
November 2, 2002	Win	(Russia) Ruslan Andrechyensko	Art of War: K. Superstar USA Finals	(United States) Biloxi, Mississippi	UD	5	3:00
September 28, 2002	Win	(United States) Travis Johnson	Strikeforce	(United States) San Jose, California	KO	2	N/A
March 17, 2000	Loss	(United States) Rudi Ott	ICMAC: Full Contact War	(United States) St. Petersburg, Florida	UD	5	3:00
For vacant ISKA Sanshou U.S. Super Middleweight Championship.
Legend: Win Loss Draw/no contest Notes

== Film career ==
Noons made his film debut in the 2014 comedy Mantervention, playing himself.

== See also ==
- List of current UFC fighters
- List of male mixed martial artists

New championship	1st EliteXC Lightweight Champion; November 10, 2007 – September 19, 2008	Vacant Noons stripped of title Title next held by EliteXC defunct on October 20, 2008
