= Strikeforce: Rousey vs. Kaufman =

Strikeforce mixed martial arts event in 2012

- The poster for Strikeforce: Rousey vs. Kaufman
- Promotion: Strikeforce
- Date: August 18, 2012
- Venue: Valley View Casino Center
- City: San Diego, California, United States
- Attendance: 3,502
- Total gate: $145,510
- Estimated viewers: 529,000
- Total purse: $368,000 (disclosed only)

Event chronology
Strikeforce: Rockhold vs. Kennedy	Strikeforce: Rousey vs. Kaufman	Strikeforce: Melendez vs. Healy

Strikeforce: Rousey vs. Kaufman was a mixed martial arts event held by Strikeforce. The event took place on August 18, 2012, at the Valley View Casino Center in San Diego, California. It was broadcast live on Showtime and Showtime Extreme.

== Background ==
The main event featured a Strikeforce Women's Bantamweight Championship bout between new titleholder Ronda Rousey and former champion Sarah Kaufman. The entire card consisted of nine sanctioned mixed martial arts bouts. The official weigh-ins, on August 17, were open to fans as reported by MMAjunkie.

Rousey appeared on Conan and on Showtime's "All Access: Ronda Rousey" to promote herself and her upcoming fight. She also appeared on the cover of ESPN's Body Issue. Rousey upped the hype at the official pre-fight press conference when she said "if I get her (Kaufman) in a choke I'm gonna hold on to it until she's actually dead..."

With the cancellation of Strikeforce's next two events and their last event featuring only male fighters, this was the last Strikeforce card to feature bouts involving female fighters.

As he was absent from Strikeforce's last event due to a private family matter, this was the last Strikeforce card featuring Mauro Ranallo providing commentary on the televised broadcast.

== Results ==
Main card (Showtime)
Weight class				Method	Round	Time	Notes
Women's Bantamweight	Ronda Rousey (c)	def.	Sarah Kaufman	Submission (armbar)	1	0:54	(Note: For the Strikeforce Women's Bantamweight Championship.)
Middleweight	Ronaldo Souza	def.	Derek Brunson	KO (punches)	1	0:41
Welterweight	Tarec Saffiedine	def.	Roger Bowling	Decision (unanimous) (30-27, 30-27, 30-27)	3	5:00
Middleweight	Anthony Smith	def.	Lumumba Sayers	Submission (triangle choke)	1	3:52
Light Heavyweight	Ovince St. Preux	def.	T. J. Cook	KO (punch)	3	0:20
Preliminary Card (Showtime Extreme)
Weight class				Method	Round	Time	Notes
Women's Bantamweight	Miesha Tate	def.	Julie Kedzie	Submission (armbar)	3	3:28
Middleweight	Adlan Amagov	def.	Keith Berry	TKO (leg kick and punches)	1	0:48
Women's Featherweight	Germaine de Randamie	def.	Hiroko Yamanaka	Decision (unanimous) (30-27, 30-27, 30-27)	3	5:00
Lightweight	Bobby Green	def.	Matt Ricehouse	Decision (unanimous) (30-27, 30-27, 30-27)	3	5:00

== Salaries ==
The disclosed fighter payroll for Strikeforce: Rousey vs. Kaufman was $368,000. Individual payouts are listed below. The numbers only include figures that Strikeforce disclosed to the state athletic commission; fight bonuses, sponsorship fees, and other unofficial bonuses were not disclosed.

=== Preliminary card ===
- Bobby Green: $16,000 ($8,000 to show, $8,000 to win)
- Matt Ricehouse: $5,000
- Germaine de Randamie: $15,000 ($7,500 to show, $7,500 to win)
- Hiroko Yamanaka: $8,000
- Adlan Amagov: $20,000 ($10,000 to show, $10,000 to win)
- Keith Berry: $2,000
- Miesha Tate: $38,000 ($19,000 to show, $19,000 to win)
- Julie Kedzie: $5,000

=== Main card ===
- Ovince St. Preux: $34,000 ($17,000 to show, $17,000 to win)
- T. J. Cook: $3,000
- Anthony Smith: $6,000 ($3,000 to show, $3,000 to win)
- Lumumba Sayers: $7,000
- Tarec Saffiedine: $35,000 ($17,500 to show, $17,500 to win)
- Roger Bowling: $10,000
- Ronaldo Souza: $94,000 ($72, 000 to show, $22,000 to win)
- Derek Brunson: $13,000

=== Main event ===
- Ronda Rousey: $40,000 ($20,000 to show, $20,000 to win)
- Sarah Kaufman: $17,000

== Viewers ==
According to Annie Van Tornhout, a Showtime Sports publicist, the event drew an average of 529,000 viewers for the live and delayed broadcast. As a result, the event became the most-watched Strikeforce card on Showtime this year and the sixth most-watched of all-time.

The broadcast peaked at 676,000 viewers for the main event, which is also the highest number this year for Strikeforce. In total, the Rousey vs. Kaufman bout drew 908,000 viewers, including Sunday's replay of the fight.
