= Strikeforce: Rockhold vs. Kennedy =

Strikeforce mixed martial arts event in 2012

- The poster for Strikeforce: Rockhold vs. Kennedy
- Promotion: Strikeforce
- Date: July 14, 2012
- Venue: Rose Garden
- City: Portland, Oregon, United States

Event chronology
Strikeforce: Barnett vs. Cormier	Strikeforce: Rockhold vs. Kennedy	Strikeforce: Rousey vs. Kaufman

Strikeforce: Rockhold vs. Kennedy was a mixed martial arts event held by Strikeforce. The event took place on July 14, 2012 at the Rose Garden in Portland, Oregon.

== Results ==
Main card (Showtime)
Weight class				Method	Round	Time	Notes
Middleweight	Luke Rockhold (c)	def.	Tim Kennedy	Decision (unanimous) (49–46, 49–46, 49–46)	5	5:00	(Note: For the Strikeforce Middleweight Championship.)
Welterweight	Nate Marquardt	def.	Tyron Woodley	KO (elbows and punches)	4	1:39	(Note: For the vacant Strikeforce Welterweight Championship.)
Middleweight	Roger Gracie	def.	Keith Jardine	Decision (unanimous) (29–27, 30–27, 30–26)	3	5:00
Middleweight	Lorenz Larkin	def.	Robbie Lawler	Decision (unanimous) (30–27, 30–27, 30–27)	3	5:00
Preliminary card (Showtime Extreme)
Weight class				Method	Round	Time	Notes
Lightweight	Pat Healy	def.	Mizuto Hirota	Decision (unanimous) (30–27, 29–28, 29–28)	3	5:00
Lightweight	Ryan Couture	def.	Joe Duarte	Decision (split) (29–28, 28–29, 29–28)	3	5:00
Lightweight	Jorge Masvidal	def.	Justin Wilcox	Decision (split) (29–28, 28–29, 30–27)	3	5:00
Welterweight	Jordan Mein	def.	Tyler Stinson	Decision (unanimous) (30–27, 30–27, 30–27)	3	5:00
Welterweight	Jason High	def.	Nate Moore	Submission (guillotine choke)	1	0:26
