= Strikeforce: Cormier vs. Mir =

Strikeforce mixed martial arts event in 2012

- The poster for Strikeforce: Cormier vs. Mir
- Promotion: Strikeforce
- Date: Cancelled
- Venue: Chesapeake Energy Arena
- City: Oklahoma City, Oklahoma, United States

Event chronology
Strikeforce: Melendez vs. Healy	Strikeforce: Cormier vs. Mir	Strikeforce: Marquardt vs. Saffiedine

Strikeforce: Cormier vs. Mir was a planned mixed martial arts event that was to be held by Strikeforce. The event was scheduled to take place on November 3, 2012, at the Chesapeake Energy Arena in Oklahoma City, Oklahoma.

== Background ==
The main event was expected to be Strikeforce Heavyweight Grand Prix champion Daniel Cormier facing former UFC Heavyweight Champion Frank Mir. However, Mir was forced to withdraw due to injury. Though fellow UFC fighters Matt Mitrione (who declined the fight) & Pat Barry were possible replacements for Mir, the bout was eventually cancelled. The Cormier/Mir bout would eventually take place at UFC on Fox: Henderson vs. Melendez in April 2013, following Strikeforce's closure and Cormier's signing with the UFC. In the rescheduled match-up, Cormier won by unanimous decision.

A middleweight championship bout between champion Luke Rockhold and Lorenz Larkin was originally scheduled for this event, but was called off due to an injury to Rockhold. The bout was rescheduled for the promotion's last event Strikeforce: Marquardt vs. Saffiedine in January 2013, but both Rockhold and Larkin were replaced by Ronaldo Souza and UFC middleweight Ed Herman due to their own respective injuries.

On October 12, 2012, Strikeforce announced it was cancelling this event, the second in a row. Injuries to headliner Frank Mir, as well as co-headliner and middleweight champion Luke Rockhold were cited as the deciding factors for the cancellation. Following the cancellation, the bout between Tim Kennedy & Trevor Smith was rescheduled for Strikeforce: Marquardt vs. Saffiedine in January 2013, where Kennedy won via third round submission.

== Cancelled fight card ==
=== Main card (Showtime) ===
- Middleweight bout: Tim Kennedy vs. Trevor Smith
- Lightweight bout: Jorge Masvidal vs. Bobby Green
- Middleweight Championship bout: Luke Rockhold (c) vs. Lorenz Larkin
- Heavyweight bout: Daniel Cormier vs. Frank Mir

== See also ==
- List of Strikeforce events
- List of Strikeforce champions
