= Strikeforce: Henderson vs. Babalu II =

Strikeforce mixed martial arts event in 2010

- The poster for Strikeforce: Henderson vs. Babalu II
- Promotion: Strikeforce
- Date: December 4, 2010
- Venue: Scottrade Center
- City: St. Louis, Missouri, United States
- Attendance: 7,146

Event chronology
| Strikeforce: Diaz vs. Noons II | Strikeforce: Henderson vs. Babalu II | Strikeforce Challengers: Woodley vs. Saffiedine |

Strikeforce: Henderson vs. Babalu II, was a mixed martial arts event that was held by Strikeforce on December 4, 2010 at the Scottrade Center in St Louis, Missouri, United States.

== Background ==
The winner of the Sobral-Henderson bout was promised the next shot at Rafael Cavalcante's Light Heavyweight Championship.

Undercard matches featured four protegees from Strikeforce's Fighter Exchange Program. The Fighter Exchange Program is intended to be a tie-in to the Career Mode of the EA Sports MMA game, and features multimedia documentation of four young prospects (Bettega, Cummins, Martytniuok, Phillips) traveling, learning, and training with four established veterans (Jacare Souza, Jason Miller, Gegard Mousasi, Luke Rockhold). These matches were streamed live at Sherdog.com.

Herschel Walker pulled out of his fight with Scott Carson due to a cut under his left eye. The bout was moved to January's Strikeforce: Diaz vs. Cyborg card, where Walker defeated Carson by first round TKO.

Scott Smith was originally slated to take on Jesse Finney at this event, but would instead face the debuting Paul Daley on this same card. Before a replacement opponent could be named, Finney withdrew from the card himself due to an eye injury.

Valentijn Overeem also pulled out of a bout with Antônio Silva after suffering an elbow injury. Mike Kyle stepped in to replace Overeem.

This was the first Strikeforce event where 4 main card fights ended in a knockout.

The event drew an estimated 341,000 viewers, with a peak at 465,000 on Showtime.

== Results ==
Main Card
| Weight class | | | | Method | Round | Time | Notes |
|---|---|---|---|---|---|---|---|
| Light Heavyweight | Dan Henderson | def. | Renato Sobral | KO (punches) | 1 | 1:53 |
| Welterweight | Paul Daley | def. | Scott Smith | KO (punch) | 1 | 2:09 |
| Heavyweight | Antônio Silva | def. | Mike Kyle | TKO (punches) | 2 | 2:49 |
| Middleweight | Robbie Lawler | def. | Matt Lindland | KO (punches) | 1 | 0:50 |
| Light Heavyweight | Ovince St. Preux | def. | Benji Radach | Decision (unanimous) (30–27, 30–26, 30–25) | 3 | 5:00 |
Preliminary Card
| Catchweight (130 lb) | J.W. Wright | def. | Josh Epps | Submission (guillotine choke) | 1 | 1:29 |
| Middleweight | Booker DeRousse | def. | Coltin Cole | TKO (strikes) | 2 | 3:04 |
| Light Heavyweight | Mike Glenn | def. | Lee Brousseau | TKO (strikes) | 1 | 2:00 |
| Lightweight | Matt Ricehouse | def. | Tom Aaron | Decision (unanimous) (29–28, 30–27, 29–28) | 3 | 5:00 |
| Middleweight | Cortez Coleman | def. | Lucas Lopes | Submission (guillotine choke) | 1 | 2:04 |
| Light Heavyweight | Patrick Cummins | def. | Terrell Brown | TKO (strikes) | 1 | 2:44 |
| Lightweight | Justin Lawrence | def. | Max Martyniouk | Decision (technical) (30–27, 30–27, 30–27). | 3 | 5:00 | (Note: The fight was stopped in round 3 due to an accidental soccer kick by Lawrence.) |
| Welterweight | Wayne Phillips | def. | Fernando Bettega | Decision (split) (29–28, 29–28, 28–29) | 3 | 5:00 |

== See also ==
- Strikeforce (mixed martial arts)
- List of Strikeforce champions
- List of Strikeforce events
- 2010 in Strikeforce
