= Matt Ricehouse =

American mixed martial arts fighter

- Born: Matthew Allen Ricehouse; March 11, 1987 (age 39)
- Nationality: American
- Height: 5 ft 11 in (1.80 m)
- Weight: 155 lb (70 kg; 11.1 st)
- Division: Lightweight
- Reach: 73 in (190 cm)
- Style: Jiu-Jitsu
- Stance: Orthodox
- Fighting out of: St. Charles, Missouri
- Team: St. Charles MMA, Team Vaghi
- Rank: Black belt in Brazilian Jiu-Jitsu
- Years active: 2010-present

Mixed martial arts record
- Total: 7
- Wins: 6
- By knockout: 2
- By submission: 1
- By decision: 3
- Losses: 1
- By decision: 1

Other information
- Mixed martial arts record from Sherdog

Matt Ricehouse (born March 11, 1987) is an American professional mixed martial artist who most recently competed for the Strikeforce promotion. Matt is currently a black belt in Brazilian Jiu Jitsu under Rodrigo Vaghi (a fifth degree black belt under Rickson Gracie) and trains out of St. Charles MMA in St. Charles, MO under head coach Mike Rogers.

== Mixed martial arts career ==
=== Early career ===
Ricehouse began MMA as an amateur in 2007, amassing a record of 7 wins and no losses over the next three years.

Ricehouse made his professional debut in January 2010.

=== Strikeforce ===
Ricehouse made his Strikeforce debut in May 2010 as he faced Gregory Wilson at Strikeforce: Heavy Artillery. He won the fight via submission.

He returned to the promotion in late 2010 as he faced Tom Aaron at Strikeforce: Henderson vs. Babalu II. He won the fight via unanimous decision.

Ricehouse next bout was six months later as he faced highly touted Ryan Couture at Strikeforce Challengers: Fodor vs. Terry. He won the fight via unanimous decision, giving the young Couture the first defeat on his professional record.

For his fourth fight in the promotion, Ricehouse faced grappler Bill Cooper at Strikeforce Challengers: Britt vs. Sayers. He won the fight via unanimous decision for the third consecutive time.

On August 18, 2012, Ricehouse suffered his first defeat at Strikeforce: Rousey vs. Kaufman to Bobby Green via unanimous decision. Despite going 4-1 under the Strikeforce banner, Ricehouse was not among the fighters brought over to the Ultimate Fighting Championship following the closure of Strikeforce that December and their subsequent talent merger.

== Mixed martial arts record ==
Professional record breakdown
7 matches	6 wins	1 loss
By knockout	2	0
By submission	1	0
By decision	3	1

Res.	Record	Opponent	Method	Event	Date	Round	Time	Location	Notes
Loss	6–1	Bobby Green	Decision (unanimous)	Strikeforce: Rousey vs. Kaufman	August 18, 2012	3	5:00	San Diego, California, United States	
Win	6–0	Bill Cooper	Decision (unanimous)	Strikeforce Challengers: Britt vs. Sayers	November 18, 2011	3	5:00	Las Vegas, Nevada, United States	
Win	5–0	Ryan Couture	Decision (unanimous)	Strikeforce Challengers: Fodor vs. Terry	June 24, 2011	3	5:00	Kent, Washington, United States	
Win	4–0	Tom Aaron	Decision (unanimous)	Strikeforce: Henderson vs. Babalu II	December 4, 2010	3	5:00	St.Louis, Missouri, United States	
Win	3–0	Mike Foster	TKO (punches)	Premier Combat League - Bad Intentions	August 21, 2010	2	1:27	Glen Carbon, Illinois, United States	
Win	2–0	Gregory Wilson	Submission (rear-naked choke)	Strikeforce: Heavy Artillery	May 15, 2010	3	0:45	St. Louis, Missouri, United States	
Win	1–0	Tim Thomas	TKO (punches)	DFC - Devastation Fight Club	January 30, 2010	3	1:34	Cape Girardeau, Missouri, United States	
