= Haim Gozali =

Israeli mixed martial artist

Haim Gozali חיים גוזלי
- Born: 6 May 1973 (age 53); Bat Yam, Israel
- Height: 6 ft 2 in (1.88 m)
- Weight: 185 lb (84 kg; 13.2 st)
- Division: Light Heavyweight; Middleweight; Welterweight
- Reach: 72 in (183 cm)
- Stance: Southpaw
- Fighting out of: Bat Yam, Israel
- Team: Renzo Gracie Israel
- Rank: 3rd degree black belt in Brazilian jiu-jitsu under Renzo Gracie
- Years active: 1998–present

Mixed martial arts record
- Total: 21
- Wins: 15
- By knockout: 1
- By submission: 14
- Losses: 6
- By knockout: 1
- By submission: 2
- By decision: 3

Other information
- Mixed martial arts record from Sherdog

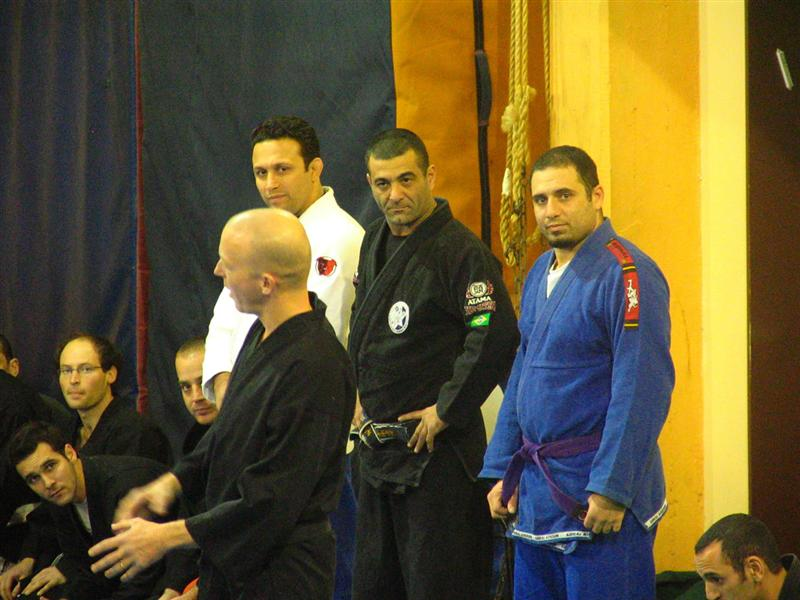
Renzo Gracie, Mordi and Haim Gozali look at the Akban headmaster.

Haim Gozali (Hebrew: חיים גוזלי; born May 6, 1973) is an Israeli mixed martial artist. He is best known for his tenure in Bellator. Gozali is a 3rd degree black belt in Brazilian jiu-jitsu under Renzo Gracie.

== Background ==
Gozali served in the Israel Defense Forces.

In 2005, Gozali was stabbed while working as a bouncer in an Israeli night club.

Gozali's nickname, "The Israeli Batman", is related to his obsession with the superhero. He has "collected enough Batman comics and paraphernalia to fill up most of a room in his house in Bat Yam" and he "has enough Batman tattoos to cover a good part of his skin, with the bat-sign prominently carried across his chest."

Gozali's son, Aviv Gozali, is also a mixed martial artist.

Gozali is the president of ADCC Israel and the first Israeli to compete in an ADCC event.

== Professional career ==
Gozali began his mixed martial arts (MMA) career in 1998, losing to Carlos Newton via armbar. He compiled a 6–3 record before debuting for Bellator MMA in 2016.

In 2010, Gozali produced the MMA event Israel FC: Genesis in Israel, featuring multiple UFC veterans. He later signed with Bellator to work as a promoter and produced 4 events in Israel with the promotion - Bellator 164, Bellator 188, Bellator 209, and Bellator 234, which took place at Menora Mivtachim Arena in Tel Aviv.

=== Bellator MMA ===
On June 24, 2017, Gozali faced Ryan Couture in a welterweight bout on the Bellator 180 preliminary card, becoming the first Israeli MMA fighter to compete in Madison Square Garden. He lost the fight via unanimous decision.

At Bellator 188 on November 16, 2017, Gozali fought Mykyta Mikhno, winning via submission. Gozali then fought Jose Campos at Bellator 192, losing via unanimous decision. Gozali fought Ryan Couture in a rematch at Bellator 209, losing again via unanimous decision.

==== Last fight ====
After three straight victories, Gozali competed at Bellator 234 on November 15, 2019, with his son Aviv, in their native Israel. Gozali faced Artur Pronin, winning the fight via first-round submission. Gozali retired after the fight. Gozali and Pronin's performances led to accusations of the bout being fixed. Criticism included no serious head strikes and light striking that resembled a sparring session, Pronin putting himself in inferior positions despite his experience, and the end of the fight where Gozali transitioned from an armbar to a heel hook without proper control of Pronin's leg, with Pronin tapping out immediately instead of trying to defend the submission. It was noted that Pronin was on a seven-win streak at the time with several submission victories, while this was a "hometown" bout for Gozali and his last fight.

=== Return ===
Gozali returned to MMA and began bare-knuckle boxing in 2020 after his security company faced financial hardship due to COVID-19. He made his bare-knuckle boxing debut on February 5, 2021 at BKFC Knucklemania. Gozali faced John McAllister, who had a win/loss record of 0–4. McAllister controlled the first round, out-striking Gozali. Gozali made a comeback in the second round, knocking McAllister down twice for the ref to stop the bout.

== Championships and accomplishments ==
=== Mixed martial arts ===
- Real Fight Promotion
  - RFP Middleweight Championship (One time)
- The Dice Team
  - TDT Light Heavyweight Championship (One time)

== Mixed martial arts record ==
Professional record breakdown
21 matches	15 wins	6 losses
By knockout	1	1
By submission	14	2
By decision	0	3

Res.	Record	Opponent	Method	Event	Date	Round	Time	Location	Notes
Win	15–6	Ilya Lupinov	Submission (triangle choke)	RFP 86	October 3, 2021	1	1:35	Kyiv, Ukraine	Middleweight bout; won the vacant RFP Middleweight Championship.
Win	14–6	Andrey Savchuck	Submission (heel hook)	TDT 1	June 23, 2021	1	0:05	Dubno, Ukraine	Light Heavyweight debut; won the TDT Light Heavyweight Championship.
Win	13–6	Dmitriy Makhotskiy	Submission (triangle choke)	RFP 80	October 4, 2020	2	1:56	Kyiv, Ukraine	Return to Middleweight; won the RFP Middleweight Championship.
Win	12–6	Artur Pronin	Submission (heel hook)	Bellator 234	November 15, 2019	1	4:12	Tel Aviv, Israel	
Win	11–6	Gustavo Wurlitzer	Submission (triangle choke)	Bellator 222	June 14, 2019	1	4:02	New York, New York, United States	Catchweight (175 lb) bout.
Win	10–6	Dmitriy Makhotskiy	Submission (heel hook)	RFP: International MFC 1	December 14, 2018	1	2:57	Kyiv, Ukraine	
Win	9–6	Alexey Kolesnikov	Submission (armbar)	RFP: International MFC 1	December 14, 2018	1	2:37	Kyiv, Ukraine	
Loss	8–6	Ryan Couture	Decision (unanimous)	Bellator 209	November 16, 2018	3	5:00	Tel Aviv, Israel	
Loss	8–5	Jose Campos	Decision (unanimous)	Bellator 192	January 20, 2018	3	5:00	Inglewood, California, United States	
Win	8–4	Mykyta Mikhno	Technical Submission (triangle choke)	Bellator 188	November 16, 2017	1	0:45	Tel Aviv, Israel	
Loss	7–4	Ryan Couture	Decision (unanimous)	Bellator 180	June 24, 2017	3	5:00	New York City, New York, United States	
Win	7–3	Zane Clerk	Submission (heel hook)	Bellator 164	November 10, 2016	1	1:41	Tel Aviv, Israel	
Win	6–3	Zdravko Zdravkov	Submission (armbar)	AFN 1	September 15, 2012	1	0:33	Sliven, Bulgaria	
Loss	5–3	Rustam Bogatyrev	TKO (retirement)	MFP: Mayor Cup 2012	May 26, 2012	1	5:00	Khabarovsk, Russia	
Loss	5–2	Ronaldo Souza	Submission (rear-naked choke)	Jungle Fight 7	December 17, 2006	1	1:33	Ljubljana, Slovenia	
Win	5–1	Alcs Plotkin	Submission (triangle choke)	WPKL 2	May 7, 2004	1	2:22	Israel	
Win	4–1	Yakov Mazer	KO (punch)	WPKL 1	March 23, 2003	1	1:35	Israel	
Win	3–1	Dan Koan	Submission (punches)	IVTC 2	March 11, 2002	1	4:55	Israel	
Win	2–1	Guy Micali	Submission (punches)	IFFC 1	December 5, 2000	1	3:34	Israel	
Win	1–1	Maer Cobi Coen	Submission (triangle choke)	IVTC 1	April 14, 2000	1	2:34	Israel	
Loss	0–1	Carlos Newton	Submission (armbar)	IFC: Israel vs. Canada	January 1, 1998	1	0:00	Israel	

== Bare-knuckle boxing record ==
Professional record breakdown
2 matches	2 wins	0 losses
By knockout	2	0

Res.	Record	Opponent	Method	Event	Date	Round	Time	Location	Notes
Win	2–0	Bogdan Kotlovyanov	TKO (injury)	IWCC 1	March 9, 2023	2	N/A	Tel Aviv, Israel	
Win	1–0	John McAllister	TKO (punch)	BKFC Knucklemania	February 5, 2021	2	1:08	Lakeland, Florida, United States	Cruiserweight (205 lb.) bout.
