= Pat Healy (fighter) =

American mixed martial arts fighter

- Born: Patrick John Healy; July 20, 1983 (age 43); Salem, Oregon, United States
- Other names: Bam Bam
- Nationality: American
- Height: 5 ft 10 in (1.78 m)
- Weight: 155 lb (70 kg; 11.1 st)
- Division: Welterweight; Lightweight
- Reach: 74 in (188 cm)
- Stance: Orthodox
- Fighting out of: Portland, Oregon, United States
- Team: Sports Lab Fight Team
- Rank: Purple belt in Brazilian Jiu-Jitsu under Fabiano Scherner
- Wrestling: NCAA Division II Wrestling
- Years active: 2001–2018

Mixed martial arts record
- Total: 59
- Wins: 34
- By knockout: 7
- By submission: 15
- By decision: 12
- Losses: 24
- By knockout: 7
- By submission: 6
- By decision: 11
- No contests: 1

Other information
- Mixed martial arts record from Sherdog

Patrick "Pat" Healy (born July 20, 1983) is an American professional retired mixed martial artist who last competed in the Lightweight division of ACB. A professional competitor since 2001, Healy has also formerly competed for the UFC, Strikeforce, the WEC, the IFL, the MFC, King of the Cage, Titan FC and Shark Fights. His twin brother, Ryan, is also a professional mixed martial artist. Healy holds notable wins over Dan Hardy, Paul Daley, and Carlos Condit.

== Background ==
Born and raised in Salem, Oregon, Healy and his twin brother, Ryan, have been training to fight in mixed martial arts since they were 14 years old. A friend trained in Muay Thai and would spar with them, knocking out Ryan with a head kick the first time they trained, and this would result in a long line of more combat sports experience. Healy also wrestled while growing up, placing in the state finals for South Salem High School and finishing seventh while also being a four-year letterman in the sport. Healy was also a two-time All-State selection in football and later competed in collegiate wrestling for Southern Illinois University Edwardsville, which was then a Division II program.

== Mixed martial arts career ==
=== World Extreme Cagefighting ===
With a record of 9–6, Healy signed on with small upstart promotion, World Extreme Cagefighting. Healy made his debut at WEC 15 against future Cage Rage World Welterweight Champion and UFC veteran, Chris Lytle, losing via a close split decision.

Healy did not fight for the promotion for an entire year but won four of his next five fights which included a win over future UFC and Strikeforce veteran Paul Daley via guillotine choke submission. Healy then returned to the WEC at WEC 19 against UFC veteran Tiki Ghosn. The fight was called off after Ghosn injured his shoulder and was declared unable to continue. Healy then won his next four fights which included a win over future UFC Interim Welterweight Champion Carlos Condit via rear-naked choke submission.

=== Ultimate Fighting Championship ===
In 2006, Healy was signed to fight The Ultimate Fighter veteran, Anthony Torres, at UFC Fight Night 6. Torres took Healy down and controlled him on the ground before securing a rear-naked choke submission ending the fight midway through round one.

=== International Fight League ===
Healy signed with the International Fight League, competing for the Nevada Lions and made his debut for the organization on January 19, 2007, in Oakland, California, winning via unanimous decision. In his next appearance Healy faced future UFC veteran and Miletich Fighting Systems product, Rory Markham and lost after he was knocked out in the third round. Healy's next bout was against future King of the Cage Welterweight Champion Mike Guymon and Healy won via split decision before dropping a unanimous decision loss to future UFC Welterweight Jake Ellenberger. This was Healy's last appearance for the organization, as it would close operations months later.

=== Maximum Fighting Championships ===
When Healy signed with the Canadian promotion, Maximum Fighting Championships, he was immediately named the number one contender for the MFC Welterweight Title.

His title shot came at MFC 17 against the then champion, Ryan Ford. Healy won the fight via submission in the third round. His first and only title defense was a rematch against Ford. Healy again won the fight by a narrow split decision before signing with Shark Fights and competing for the Welterweight Championship in that organization as well, but lost to current UFC veteran TJ Waldburger. Healy relinquished his title after signing with Strikeforce.

=== Strikeforce ===
Healy dropped down to lightweight and fought one fight in the weight class, a win, before he began fighting for Strikeforce. Healy made his Strikeforce debut in May 2010 at Strikeforce Challengers: Lindland vs. Casey, defeating former Heavyweight fighter Bryan Travers via unanimous decision.

Healy fought former Strikeforce Lightweight Champion Josh Thomson at Strikeforce: Fedor vs. Werdum. Healy lost the fight via rear-naked choke submission in the third round.

Healy headlined a fight against undefeated Lyle Beerbohm at Strikeforce Challengers: Beerbohm vs. Healy. He won the fight via unanimous decision, handing Beerbohm his first professional loss.

At Strikeforce Challengers: Gurgel vs. Duarte, Healy fought debuting Eric Wisely, winning the fight via unanimous decision.

At Strikeforce World Grand Prix: Barnett vs. Kharitonov, Healy replaced an injured Josh Thomson, defeating Maximo Blanco via second round submission due to a rear-naked choke submission.

Healy faced Caros Fodor at Strikeforce: Tate vs. Rousey and won via submission in the third round.

Healy faced Mizuto Hirota at Strikeforce: Rockhold vs. Kennedy. He won via unanimous decision.

Having won five fights in a row, Healy was offered a title fight against Strikeforce Lightweight Champion Gilbert Melendez at Strikeforce: Melendez vs. Healy on September 29, 2012. However, on September 23, it was announced that the card would be cancelled when Melendez pulled out of the fight due to injury.

The title fight with Melendez was then rescheduled for the final Strikforce show, Strikeforce: Marquardt vs. Saffiedine, on January 12, 2013. Once again, Melendez pulled out of the bout citing a shoulder injury. Healy stayed on the card as he was to face Jorge Masvidal. However, on December 22, it was announced that Masvidal pulled out of the fight due to a back injury. On January 2, it was announced that Healy would face an undefeated newcomer Kurt Holobaugh. He won the fight via unanimous decision.

=== Return to the UFC ===
Healy returned to the UFC to face Jim Miller on April 27, 2013, at UFC 159. He won the back-and-forth fight via technical submission due to a rear naked choke in the third round. The bout also won him Fight of the Night and Submission of the Night bonus awards. On May 14, 2013, Healy was suspended for 90 days for failing a drug test for marijuana. The fight result was changed to No Contest, and his submission bonus was rescinded, going instead to Bryan Caraway, who also fought on the card. Healy also lost his Fight of the Night bonus.

Healy faced Khabib Nurmagomedov on September 21, 2013, at UFC 165. He lost the fight via unanimous decision.

Healy was expected to face Jamie Varner on December 14, 2013, at UFC on Fox 9. However, Varner pulled out of the bout due to injury and was replaced by Bobby Green He lost the fight via unanimous decision.

Healy faced Jorge Masvidal at UFC on Fox 11. He lost the fight via unanimous decision.

Healy faced Gleison Tibau on July 16, 2014, at UFC Fight Night 45. He lost the fight via unanimous decision, and was subsequently released from the promotion.

=== Independent promotions ===
On December 20, 2014, Healy faced Bellator veteran Ricardo Tirloni at Arena Tour 4. He won the back and forth fight by split decision.

=== Return to Titan Fighting Championship ===
On December 23, 2014, it was announced that Healy had signed a multi-fight contract with Titan FC, and was expected to return to the promotion in early 2015. On March 20, 2015, he faced undefeated Kurt Kinser for the inaugural Titan FC Lightweight Championship at Titan FC 33. Healy won the fight via split decision.

Healy was originally scheduled to make his first title defense against fellow UFC veteran Mike Ricci at Titan FC 34 on July 18, 2015, however, Ricci was forced out of the bout due to injury and was replaced by Marcus Edwards. Healy won the fight via third-round TKO. For his next title defense, Healy is expected to headline Titan FC 35 against veteran Rick Hawn. He missed weight for this fight, and was stripped of the title; the vacant championship remained on the line for Hawn only. Hawn won the fight by split decision.

=== Absolute Championship Berkut ===
Healy faced Leandro Silva on January 13, 2017, at ACB 51: Silva vs. Torgeson. He lost the fight via TKO in the first round.

Healy faced Brendan Loughnane on July 22, 2017, at ACB 65: Silva vs. Agnaev. He won the back-and-forth fight via split decision.

Healy faced Magomed Raisov on January 13, 2018, at ACB 78: Young Eagles 24. He lost the fight via technical knockout and announced his retirement from competing professionally at his Facebook after the loss.

== Championships and accomplishments ==
- Ultimate Fighting Championship
  - Fight of the Night (one time)
- Maximum Fighting Championship
  - MFC Welterweight Championship (One time)
  - One successful title defense
- Titan Fighting Championship
  - TFC Lightweight Championship (One time)
  - One successful title defense

== Mixed martial arts record ==
Professional record breakdown
59 matches	34 wins	24 losses
By knockout	7	7
By submission	15	6
By decision	12	11
No contests	1	

Res.	Record	Opponent	Method	Event	Date	Round	Time	Location	Notes
Loss	34–24 (1)	Magomed Raisov	TKO (punches)	ACB 78: Young Eagles 24	January 13, 2018	1	1:37	Grozny, Russia	
Win	34–23 (1)	Brendan Loughnane	Decision (split)	ACB 65: Silva vs. Agnaev	July 22, 2017	3	5:00	Sheffield, England	
Loss	33–23 (1)	Leandro Silva	TKO (punches)	ACB 51: Silva vs. Torgeson	January 13, 2017	1	0:38	Irvine, California, United States	
Loss	33–22 (1)	Gesias Cavalcante	KO (punches)	Titan FC 39: Cavalcante vs. Healy	June 10, 2016	1	2:07	Coral Gables, Florida, United States	For the vacant Titan FC Lightweight Championship.
Win	33–21 (1)	Muhsin Corbbrey	Decision (unanimous)	Titan FC 37	March 4, 2016	3	5:00	Ridgefield, Washington, United States	
Loss	32–21 (1)	Rick Hawn	Decision (split)	Titan FC 35	September 19, 2015	5	5:00	Ridgefield, Washington, United States	Stripped of the Titan FC Lightweight Championship for missing weight.
Win	32–20 (1)	Marcus Edwards	TKO (punches)	Titan FC 34	July 18, 2015	2	3:17	Kansas City, Missouri, United States	Defended the Titan FC Lightweight Championship.
Win	31–20 (1)	Kurt Kinser	Decision (split)	Titan FC 33	March 20, 2015	5	5:00	Mobile, Alabama, United States	Won Titan FC Lightweight Championship.
Win	30–20 (1)	Ricardo Tirloni	Decision (split)	Arena Tour 4: Healy vs. Tirloni	December 20, 2014	3	5:00	Buenos Aires, Argentina	
Loss	29–20 (1)	Gleison Tibau	Decision (unanimous)	UFC Fight Night: Cowboy vs. Miller	July 16, 2014	3	5:00	Atlantic City, New Jersey, United States	
Loss	29–19 (1)	Jorge Masvidal	Decision (unanimous)	UFC on Fox: Werdum vs. Browne	April 19, 2014	3	5:00	Orlando, Florida, United States	
Loss	29–18 (1)	Bobby Green	Decision (unanimous)	UFC on Fox: Johnson vs. Benavidez 2	December 14, 2013	3	5:00	Sacramento, California, United States	
Loss	29–17 (1)	Khabib Nurmagomedov	Decision (unanimous)	UFC 165	September 21, 2013	3	5:00	Toronto, Ontario, Canada	
NC	29–16 (1)	Jim Miller	NC (overturned by commission)	UFC 159	April 27, 2013	3	4:02	Newark, New Jersey, United States	Originally a submission (rear-naked choke) win for Healy. Overturned when he tested positive for marijuana. Fight of the Night.
Win	29–16	Kurt Holobaugh	Decision (unanimous)	Strikeforce: Marquardt vs. Saffiedine	January 12, 2013	3	5:00	Oklahoma City, Oklahoma, United States	
Win	28–16	Mizuto Hirota	Decision (unanimous)	Strikeforce: Rockhold vs. Kennedy	July 14, 2012	3	5:00	Portland, Oregon, United States	
Win	27–16	Caros Fodor	Submission (arm-triangle choke)	Strikeforce: Tate vs. Rousey	March 3, 2012	3	3:35	Columbus, Ohio, United States	
Win	26–16	Maximo Blanco	Submission (rear-naked choke)	Strikeforce: Barnett vs. Kharitonov	September 10, 2011	2	4:27	Cincinnati, Ohio, United States	
Win	25–16	Eric Wisely	Decision (unanimous)	Strikeforce Challengers: Gurgel vs. Duarte	August 12, 2011	3	5:00	Las Vegas, Nevada, United States	
Win	24–16	Lyle Beerbohm	Decision (unanimous)	Strikeforce Challengers: Beerbohm vs. Healy	February 18, 2011	3	5:00	Cedar Park, Texas, United States	
Loss	23–16	Josh Thomson	Submission (rear-naked choke)	Strikeforce: Fedor vs. Werdum	June 26, 2010	3	4:27	San Jose, California, United States	
Win	23–15	Bryan Travers	Decision (unanimous)	Strikeforce Challengers: Lindland vs. Casey	May 21, 2010	3	5:00	Portland, Oregon, United States	
Win	22–15	Sidney Silva	TKO (knee to the body)	W-1 MMA: Bad Blood	March 20, 2010	2	2:33	Montreal, Quebec, Canada	Lightweight debut.
Win	21–15	Sal Woods	Submission (brabo choke)	TTP: Warriors Collide	October 3, 2009	1	4:31	Glen Carbon, Illinois, United States	
Loss	20–15	TJ Waldburger	Decision (unanimous)	Shark Fights 6: Stars & Stripes	September 12, 2009	3	5:00	Amarillo, Texas, United States	For Shark Fights Welterweight Championship.
Win	20–14	Ryan Ford	Decision (split)	MFC 20	February 20, 2009	5	5:00	Enoch, Alberta, Canada	Defended MFC Welterweight Championship.
Win	19–14	Ryan Ford	Submission (armbar)	MFC 17: Hostile Takeover	July 25, 2008	3	3:00	Edmonton, Alberta, Canada	Won MFC Welterweight Championship.
Loss	18–14	Jake Ellenberger	Decision (unanimous)	IFL: Las Vegas	February 29, 2008	3	4:00	Las Vegas, Nevada, United States	
Win	18–13	Mike Guymon	Decision (split)	IFL: Las Vegas	June 16, 2007	3	4:00	Las Vegas, Nevada, United States	
Loss	17–13	Rory Markham	KO (punches)	IFL: Moline	April 7, 2007	3	1:47	Moline, Illinois, United States	
Win	17–12	Ray Steinbeiss	Decision (unanimous)	IFL: Oakland	January 19, 2007	3	4:00	Oakland, California, United States	
Win	16–12	Tim Stout	Submission	Wild Bill's: Fight Night 5	November 17, 2006	1	2:10	Duluth, Georgia, United States	
Loss	15–12	Anthony Torres	Submission (rear-naked choke)	UFC Fight Night 6	August 17, 2006	1	2:37	Las Vegas, Nevada, United States	
Win	15–11	Carlos Condit	Submission (rear-naked choke)	Extreme Wars 3: Bay Area Brawl	June 3, 2006	3	2:53	Oakland, California, United States	
Win	14–11	Steve Schneider	Submission (rear-naked choke)	Titan FC 3	May 20, 2006	1	3:54	Durant, Oklahoma, United States	
Win	13–11	Brandon Melendez	Submission (rear-naked choke)	SF 15: Tribute	April 8, 2006	2	2:56	Portland, Oregon, United States	
Win	12–11	Tiki Ghosn	TKO (shoulder injury)	WEC 19	March 17, 2006	3	0:25	Lemoore, California, United States	
Loss	11–11	Chris Wilson	KO (knee)	SF 14: Resolution	January 6, 2006	1	1:28	Portland, Oregon, United States	
Loss	11–10	Carlo Prater	Submission (arm-triangle choke)	Euphoria: USA vs. Japan	November 5, 2005	2	3:57	Atlantic City, New Jersey, United States	
Win	11–9	Curt McKinnon	Submission (guillotine choke)	KOTC: Firestorm	September 24, 2005	1	2:01	Calgary, Alberta, Canada	
Win	10–9	Eddy Ellis	TKO (punches)	SF 12: Breakout	September 16, 2005	1	4:40	Portland, Oregon, United States	
Loss	9–9	Jay Hieron	Decision (unanimous)	IFC: Rock N' Rumble	July 30, 2005	3	5:00	Reno, Nevada, United States	
Win	9–8	Paul Daley	Submission (guillotine choke)	SF 11: Rumble at the Rose Garden	July 9, 2005	2	3:15	Portland, Oregon, United States	
Win	8–8	Shane Wessels	Submission (armbar)	IFC: Michigan	June 16, 2005	N/A	N/A	Sault Ste Marie, Michigan, United States	
Loss	7–8	Chris Lytle	Decision (split)	WEC 15	May 19, 2005	3	5:00	Lemoore, California, United States	
Loss	7–7	Dustin Denes	Decision (unanimous)	Absolute Fighting Championships 12	April 30, 2005	3	5:00	Fort Lauderdale, Florida, United States	
Win	7–6	Mike Wunderlich	Submission (rear-naked choke)	IFC: Warriors Challenge 19	March 26, 2005	1	N/A	Sault Ste Marie, Michigan, United States	
Loss	6–6	Francisco Soares	Submission (heel hook)	Freestyle Combat Challenge 18	March 5, 2005	1	N/A	Racine, Wisconsin, United States	
Win	6–5	Dan Hardy	Submission (guillotine choke)	Absolute Fighting Championships 10	October 30, 2004	1	3:50	Fort Lauderdale, Florida, United States	
Loss	5–5	Dave Strasser	Decision (unanimous)	Madtown Throwdown 1	August 21, 2004	3	5:00	Madison, Wisconsin, United States	
Win	5–4	Dan Hart	Submission (rear-naked choke)	Freestyle Combat Challenge 15	June 12, 2004	1	2:44	Racine, Wisconsin, United States	
Loss	4–4	Derrick Noble	Submission (guillotine choke)	HOOKnSHOOT: Boot Camp 1.1	March 8, 2003	2	N/A	Evansville, Indiana, United States	
Win	4–3	Richard Johnston	TKO (punches)	Ultimate Ring Challenge 3	January 4, 2003	2	2:20	Kelso, Washington, United States	
Loss	3–3	Brad Blackburn	KO (punches)	Rumble in the Ring 8	November 16, 2002	1	0:39	Auburn, Washington, United States	
Loss	3–2	Denis Kang	Submission (guillotine choke)	Rumble in the Ring 7	July 20, 2002	1	3:42	Auburn, Washington, United States	
Win	3–1	Rich Guerin	TKO (punches)	FCFF: Throwdown on the Fairground 1	June 1, 2002	N/A	N/A	Prineville, Oregon, United States	
Win	2–1	Sherk Julian	TKO (punches)	FCFF: Throwdown on the Fairground 1	June 1, 2002	N/A	N/A	Prineville, Oregon, United States	
Win	1–1	Eddie Evans	Submission (rear-naked choke)	FCFF: Rumble at the Roseland 3	May 11, 2002	N/A	N/A	Portland, Oregon, United States	
Loss	0–1	Brad Blackburn	KO (punch)	PPKA: Muckleshoot	August 15, 2001	1	0:39	Auburn, Washington, United States	
