= Mike Kyle =

American mixed martial arts fighter (born 1980)

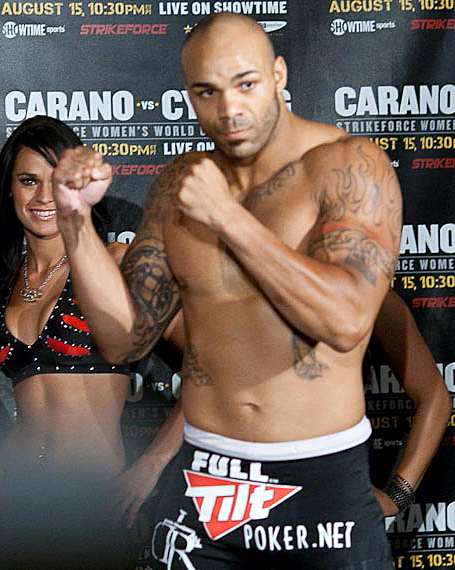
- Mike Kyle in 2009, at the weigh-in before the Strikeforce: Carano vs. Cyborg event
- Born: Michael Andrew Kyle; March 31, 1980 (age 46); Boise, Idaho, United States
- Other names: MAK
- Height: 6 ft 3 in (1.91 m)
- Weight: 220 lb (100 kg; 15 st 10 lb)
- Division: Super Heavyweight; Heavyweight; Light Heavyweight
- Reach: 77 in (196 cm)
- Stance: Orthodox
- Fighting out of: San Jose, California, United States
- Team: American Kickboxing Academy
- Years active: 2001–present

Professional boxing record
- Total: 5
- Wins: 1
- By knockout: 1
- Losses: 3
- Draws: 1

Mixed martial arts record
- Total: 45
- Wins: 23
- By knockout: 17
- By submission: 2
- By decision: 4
- Losses: 19
- By knockout: 8
- By submission: 6
- By decision: 4
- By disqualification: 1
- Draws: 1
- No contests: 2

Other information
- Boxing record from BoxRec
- Mixed martial arts record from Sherdog

Michael Andrew Kyle (born March 31, 1980) is an American professional mixed martial artist and boxer currently competing in the Heavyweight division. A professional competitor since 2001, Kyle has competed for the UFC, the WEC, Strikeforce, the World Series of Fighting, Absolute Championship Berkut, Pancrase, and King of the Cage. He is the former WEC Heavyweight Champion and King of the Cage Light Heavyweight Champion.

== Background ==
Kyle is from Boise, Idaho. He attended Nampa High School and was friends with the late Justin Eilers, who Kyle would actually end up fighting in his second fight for the UFC. Eilers and a friend who were both two grades ahead of Kyle, taught him Brazilian jiu-jitsu techniques when he was a sophomore in high school. Kyle was also a talented football player, playing fullback for Butte College in Oroville, California and Eastern Oregon University. During his early mixed martial arts career he split time between fighting and playing football. He was invited to a spring camp for the San Francisco 49ers, but ultimately decided to focus on mixed martial arts.

== Mixed martial arts career ==
=== Early career ===
Kyle held an undefeated amateur record of 3–0 before turning professional. Kyle made his professional debut on March 10, 2001, when he was 18 years old and won by TKO only 90 seconds into the fight. He then won his next two fights, also by punches before debuting in the King of the Cage promotion. Kyle made his King of the Cage debut in a fight for the King of the Cage Super Heavyweight Championship against then King of the Cage Super Heavyweight Champion Dan Bobish. Kyle, who then weighed 275 lbs. was outweighed by Bobish, who was 55 lbs. bigger than Kyle. Despite rocking Bobish early in the fight and almost pulling off the upset, Kyle was handed his first career loss after he submitted due to punches. In his next KOTC bout, Kyle made his Heavyweight debut against future King of the Cage Heavyweight Champion Paul Buentello. Kyle lost after he was knocked out from punches. After losing to Buentello, the San Jose-based American Kickboxing Academy invited Kyle to train. He accepted and has been training with AKA ever since.

In his next fight, Kyle made his debut in the WEC, and snapped his two-fight losing streak with a knockout win. The 4–2 Kyle then fought in the IFC and again won by strikes as his opponent tapped out due to punches. Kyle then also won his next two fights, which included another win under the WEC banner.

=== Ultimate Fighting Championship ===
Kyle made his UFC debut against Wes Sims winning via KO at 4:59 of round one. Sims took the fight a days notice after Kyle's original opponent filled into the main event after Tim Sylvia failed a drug test. Kyle dominated the entire first round and knocked Sims out at 4:59. Sims protested after the fight that Kyle had bitten him on the chest. During the post-fight interview, a bite mark could clearly be seen on Sims' left pectoral muscle. This marks the first time a bite has ever happened in a UFC fight since its inception at UFC 1 in 1993, when Gerard Gordeau bit Royce Gracie in the championship match. Kyle still denies any wrongdoing.

Kyle then fought the late Justin Eilers in a Heavyweight bout. This was a significant match up as Eilers was a friend of Kyle's who had actually introduced Kyle to the sport of mixed martial arts. Kyle lost the fight when he was knocked out from a punch 74 seconds into the first round.

He then fought former WEC Heavyweight Champion James Irvin at UFC 51 winning via knockout in the first round. Despite this relatively notable win in the UFC, Kyle requested his release in from the UFC to compete in Japan.

=== Post-UFC ===
Kyle then left the UFC and had planned to fight in the PRIDE Fighting Championships in Japan. However, the plan fell through and in his next bout he fought in Japan's Pancrase where he defeated Japanese legend Tsuyoshi Kohsaka. Kyle won the fight via (technical) decision in round three after ringside doctors ruled Kohsaka unable to continue. Kyle had cut down from 245 lbs. to 230 lbs. for the fight. He then fought against Devin Cole at WEC 18: Unfinished Business, and lost by TKO. This was Kyle's first defeat in the WEC.

=== Strikeforce ===
He then signed with Strikeforce, making his debut against Krzysztof Soszynski in a Heavyweight bout at Strikeforce: Shamrock vs. Gracie. The fight was declared a technical draw after Soszynski was accidentally poked in the eye by Kyle. Kyle then fought Brian Olsen for the WEC Heavyweight Championship and was disqualified after he hit Olsen with illegal strikes, for which he was placed on the national suspension list, and given an 18-month ban. After throwing Olsen over his shoulder, Kyle hit Olsen, who was on his knees and therefore a grounded opponent, with a soccer kick and then repeatedly hit him with strikes, continuing to hit Olsen even after fight referee Josh Rosenthal had physically tried to separate them, and did not stop until referee Herb Dean ran into the cage to assist Rosenthal.

The 10–5–1 Kyle then fought at Strikeforce: Shamrock vs. Le against former All-American wrestler Wayne Cole in a Heavyweight bout and lost after he was submitted from an armbar. Kyle then returned to the IFC and won his bout via knockout, and followed this up with another win, this time via unanimous decision, his first career decision win. Kyle then returned to Strikeforce to fight Rafael Cavalcante in a Light Heavyweight bout at Strikeforce: Lawler vs. Shields. Kyle picked up one of the biggest victories of his career, winning by knockout against the future Strikeforce Light Heavyweight Champion. This was also significant because it was Calvacante's first decisive loss, as his only other defeat was by disqualification against Marcio Cruz.

After his huge win over Calvacante, Kyle fought against Fabrício Werdum in a Heavyweight bout at Strikeforce: Carano vs. Cyborg in San Jose, California. He lost the bout via guillotine choke submission.

He then fought Jeremy Freitag at Xtreme MMA Australia 1 winning via TKO due to knees in the third round.

=== King of the Cage ===
Kyle next signed with King of the Cage and fought against Travis Wiuff in a Heavyweight bout, initially winning by TKO (doctor stoppage) in the second round. However, it was changed to a no contest decision after it was determined Kyle hit Wiuff after the bell.

In his second fight with King of the Cage Kyle fought Jon Murphy and won via TKO at 4:53 of round two. He then fought Tony Lopez for the King of the Cage Light Heavyweight Championship and won via split decision after a five-round battle, becoming the King of the Cage Light Heavyweight Champion.

=== Return to Strikeforce ===
Kyle fought against Abongo Humphrey at Strikeforce Challengers: del Rosario vs. Mahe. Kyle won via submission in the second round.

Kyle fought against Steve Oliver at Xtreme MMA Australia 3 Kyle won via TKO due to punches in round one, winning the XMMA Light Heavyweight Championship.

Kyle stepped in on late notice to fight Antônio "Bigfoot" Silva at Strikeforce: Henderson vs. Babalu II on December 4 in St. Louis, Missouri in a Heavyweight bout. Kyle knocked Silva down with a powerful right hand and delivered many shots on the ground but was unable to finish. Silva defeated Kyle via second-round TKO. Kyle later revealed that he broke his hand during the fight.

Kyle was set to face Gegard Mousasi at Strikeforce: Diaz vs. Daley, but had to withdraw due to a broken hand. Former UFC veteran Keith Jardine stepped in on short notice as his replacement.

Kyle was again scheduled to fight Mousasi at Strikeforce World Grand Prix: Barnett vs. Kharitonov but Mousasi withdrew for unknown reasons and was replaced by Strikeforce newcomer Marcos Rogério de Lima. Kyle won by unanimous decision, picking apart the younger fighter with boxing techniques.

Kyle was expected to face Gegard Mousasi at Strikeforce: Tate vs. Rousey, but withdrew from the fight due to injury. He next faced Rafael Cavalcante in a rematch at Strikeforce 40 in what would be a title eliminator match for the vacant Strikeforce Light Heavyweight Championship. Kyle lost the fight via guillotine choke in the first round. After the fight, Cavalcante tested positive for a banned substance and, as a result, the CSAC declared the fight a "no contest".

Kyle finally faced Mousasi at Strikeforce: Marquardt vs. Saffiedine on January 12, 2013. He lost via submission in the first round. Kyle said that he would retire following the loss.

=== Independent Promotions ===
He has since stated that he will not retire and he was scheduled to fight veteran Valentijn Overeem in May but Overeem was forced out due to injury.

Kyle then had a rematch with Travis Wiuff and won via knockout only 21 seconds into the fight. Kyle landed a lead counter-left hook that rocked the back of Wiuff's head who seemed to be unconscious, Kyle then landed a hammerfist before telling the referee that Wiuff was "out" but the fight had not been called until Kyle landed another punch to the downed Wiuff. Kyle was visibly upset after the fight with the referee, feeling that the stoppage was late.

Kyle was expected to face Maxim Grishin at Fight Nights: Battle of Moscow 17 on September 30, 2014. However, Kyle pulled out of the bout due to injury, he was replaced with Trevor Prangley.

Kyle faced Evgeny Erokhin on December 20, 2014, at FEFoMP: Russia's MMA Supercup. He lost the fight via KO in the second round.

=== World Series of Fighting ===
Kyle was to face former UFC veteran Anthony Johnson on September 14, 2013, at WSOF 5. However, Johnson was forced out of the bout due to injury and Kyle faced former UFC Heavyweight Champion Andrei Arlovski at the event. Although he knocked Arlovski down with right hands in the first and third round, he lost the fight via unanimous decision.

Mike Kyle vs. Anthony Johnson was scheduled for December 7, 2013, in Vancouver, British Columbia, Canada but was later canceled because Kyle was forced off the fight because of a broken toe.

Kyle eventually faced Anthony Johnson at WSOF 8. Kyle lost via KO in the first round.

=== Absolute Championship Berkut ===
Kyle faced Denis Goltsov on March 26, 2016, at ACB 32. He lost the fight via submission in the first round.

Kyle faced Dan Charles on January 13, 2017, at ACB 51. He won the fight via TKO in the first round.

A rematch with Evgeny Erokhin was expected to take place on July 23, 2017, at ACB 65. However, the bout did not go ahead as planned.

== Professional boxing ==
Kyle made his professional boxing debut on January 17, 2003, as a heavyweight, losing via unanimous decision.

Kyle returned to the boxing ring in 2016, winning via knockout for his first professional win. Kyle would go 0–2–1 before ending the year, however, most recently losing a unanimous decision to undefeated fighter Darmani Rock.

== Personal life ==
Kyle is married and has one daughter with his current wife, as well as two sons from a previous marriage. He is of partial Irish descent.

== Championships and accomplishments ==
- King of the Cage
  - KOTC Light Heavyweight Championship (One time; former)
- Xtreme MMA Australia
  - XMMA Light Heavyweight Championship (One time; former)
- Ultimate Fighting Championship
  - UFC.com Awards
    - 2005: Ranked #8 Knockout of the Year vs. James Irvin

== Mixed martial arts record ==
Professional record breakdown
45 matches	23 wins	19 losses
By knockout	17	8
By submission	2	6
By decision	4	4
By disqualification	0	1
Draws	1	
No contests	2	

Res.	Record	Opponent	Method	Event	Date	Round	Time	Location	Notes
Loss	23–19–1 (2)	Jordan Powell	Submission (armbar)	PureCombat: Warrior Spirit 2	October 5, 2019	1	1:03	Oroville, California, United States	
Loss	23–18–1 (2)	Viktor Pešta	Submission (rear-naked choke)	OKTAGON 13	July 27, 2019	1	1:59	Prague, Czech Republic	Catchweight (212 lb) bout.
Loss	23–17–1 (2)	Mo De'Reese	TKO (submission to punches)	PFL 8	October 5, 2018	1	2:38	New Orleans, Louisiana, United States	2018 PFL Heavyweight Playoffs Alternate bout.
Loss	23–16–1 (2)	Caio Alencar	Decision (unanimous)	PFL 7	August 30, 2018	3	5:00	Atlantic City, New Jersey, United States	
Win	23–15–1 (2)	Daniel Gallemore	TKO (knees)	PFL: Fight Night	November 2, 2017	1	1:01	Washington, D.C., United States	
Loss	22–15–1 (2)	Josh Copeland	Decision (unanimous)	PFL: Everett	July 29, 2017	3	5:00	Everett, Washington, United States	
Win	22–14–1 (2)	Dan Charles	TKO (punches)	ACB 51: Silva vs. Torgeson	January 13, 2017	1	2:15	Irvine, California, United States	
Loss	21–14–1 (2)	Denis Goltsov	Technical Submission (triangle choke)	ACB 32: The Battle of Lions	March 26, 2016	1	2:18	Moscow, Russia	
Loss	21–13–1 (2)	Clifford Starks	Decision (unanimous)	WSOF 22	August 1, 2015	3	5:00	Las Vegas, Nevada, United States	Light Heavyweight bout.
Win	21–12–1 (2)	Baga Agaev	Submission (guillotine choke)	Abu Dhabi Warriors 2	March 26, 2015	1	1:55	Abu Dhabi, United Arab Emirates	
Loss	20–12–1 (2)	Evgeny Erokhin	KO (punch)	FEFoMP: Russia's MMA Supercup	December 20, 2014	2	2:59	Khabarovsk, Russia	
Loss	20–11–1 (2)	Anthony Johnson	KO (punches)	WSOF 8	January 18, 2014	1	2:03	Hollywood, Florida, United States	Light Heavyweight bout.
Loss	20–10–1 (2)	Andrei Arlovski	Decision (unanimous)	WSOF 5	September 14, 2013	3	5:00	Atlantic City, New Jersey, United States	
Win	20–9–1 (2)	Travis Wiuff	KO (punches)	CFA 11: Kyle vs. Wiuff 2	May 24, 2013	1	0:21	Coral Gables, Florida, United States	Return to Heavyweight.
Loss	19–9–1 (2)	Gegard Mousasi	Submission (rear-naked choke)	Strikeforce: Marquardt vs. Saffiedine	January 12, 2013	1	4:09	Oklahoma City, Oklahoma, United States	
NC	19–8–1 (2)	Rafael Cavalcante	NC (overturned by CSAC)	Strikeforce: Barnett vs. Cormier	May 19, 2012	1	0:33	San Jose, California, United States	Originally a submission loss; overturned to a no contest after Cavalcante tested positive for a banned substance.
Win	19–8–1 (1)	Marcos Rogério de Lima	Decision (unanimous)	Strikeforce: Barnett vs. Kharitonov	September 10, 2011	3	5:00	Cincinnati, Ohio, United States	
Loss	18–8–1 (1)	Antônio Silva	TKO (punches)	Strikeforce: Henderson vs. Babalu II	December 4, 2010	2	2:49	St. Louis, Missouri, United States	Heavyweight bout.
Win	18–7–1 (1)	Steve Oliver	TKO (punches)	Xtreme MMA Australia 3	November 5, 2010	1	N/A	Sydney, Australia	Won the XMMA Light Heavyweight Championship.
Win	17–7–1 (1)	Abongo Humphrey	Submission (rear-naked choke)	Strikeforce Challengers: del Rosario vs. Mahe	July 23, 2010	2	3:28	Everett, Washington, United States	
Win	16–7–1 (1)	Tony Lopez	Decision (split)	KOTC: Honor	May 14, 2010	5	5:00	Mescalero, New Mexico, United States	Return to Light Heavyweight. Won the KOTC Light Heavyweight Championship.
Win	15–7–1 (1)	Jon Murphy	TKO (punches and elbows)	KOTC: Legacy	March 26, 2010	2	4:53	Reno, Nevada, United States	
NC	14–7–1 (1)	Travis Wiuff	NC (punch after the bell)	KOTC: Vengeance	February 12, 2010	2	5:00	Mescalero, New Mexico, United States	Originally a TKO win for Kyle; decision overturned to a no contest after punches were determined to have landed after the bell.
Win	14–7–1	Jeremy Freitag	TKO (punches)	Xtreme MMA Australia 1	December 20, 2009	3	4:51	Sydney, Australia	
Loss	13–7–1	Fabrício Werdum	Submission (guillotine choke)	Strikeforce: Carano vs. Cyborg	August 15, 2009	1	1:24	San Jose, California, United States	Return to Heavyweight.
Win	13–6–1	Rafael Cavalcante	TKO (punches)	Strikeforce: Lawler vs. Shields	June 6, 2009	2	4:05	St. Louis, Missouri, United States	
Win	12–6–1	Mychal Clark	Decision (unanimous)	JG/TKT Promotions: Fighting 4 Kidz	August 30, 2008	3	5:00	Santa Monica, California, United States	
Win	11–6–1	Rudy Martin	TKO (punches)	IFC: Caged Combat	April 26, 2008	1	0:41	Nampa, Idaho, United States	Light Heavyweight debut.
Loss	10–6–1	Wayne Cole	Submission (armbar)	Strikeforce: Shamrock vs. Le	March 29, 2008	1	0:45	San Jose, California, United States	
Loss	10–5–1	Brian Olsen	DQ (punches after the bell)	WEC 20	May 5, 2006	1	3:45	Lemoore, California, United States	For the WEC Heavyweight Championship.
Draw	10–4–1	Krzysztof Soszynski	Technical Draw (thumb to Soszynski's eye)	Strikeforce: Shamrock vs. Gracie	March 10, 2006	1	2:02	San Jose, California, United States	Accidental eye poke rendered Soszynski unable to continue.
Loss	10–4	Devin Cole	TKO (punches)	WEC 18: Unfinished Business	January 13, 2006	2	2:56	Lemoore, California, United States	
Win	10–3	Tsuyoshi Kohsaka	Technical Decision (unanimous)	Pancrase: Spiral 8	October 2, 2005	3	1:17	Yokohama, Japan	
Win	9–3	James Irvin	KO (punch)	UFC 51	February 5, 2005	1	1:55	Las Vegas, Nevada, United States	
Loss	8–3	Justin Eilers	KO (punch)	UFC 49	August 21, 2004	1	1:14	Las Vegas, Nevada, United States	
Win	8–2	Wes Sims	KO (knee and punches)	UFC 47	April 2, 2004	1	4:59	Las Vegas, Nevada, United States	
Win	7–2	Jude Hargett	TKO (punches)	WEC 9	January 16, 2004	1	4:09	Lemoore, California, United States	Won the inaugural WEC Heavyweight Championship.
Win	6–2	Dan Chase	TKO (injury)	King of the Rockies	January 3, 2004	1	0:12	Fort Collins, Colorado, United States	
Win	5–2	Jason Reed	TKO (submission to punches)	IFC: Battleground Boise	October 25, 2003	1	1:52	Boise, Idaho, United States	
Win	4–2	Jerry Vrbanovic	KO (punches)	WEC 8	October 17, 2003	1	0:12	Lemoore, California, United States	
Loss	3–2	Paul Buentello	KO (punches)	KOTC 18	November 1, 2002	2	1:24	Reno, Nevada, United States	Heavyweight debut.
Loss	3–1	Dan Bobish	TKO (submission to punches)	KOTC 13	May 17, 2002	1	3:25	Reno, Nevada, United States	For the KOTC Super Heavyweight Championship.
Win	3–0	Nate Russak	TKO (submission to punches)	Gladiator Challenge 9	February 10, 2002	1	2:39	San Jacinto, California, United States	
Win	2–0	Kauai Kupihea	TKO (punches)	Night of the Knockout 2	June 9, 2001	2	N/A	Boise, Idaho, United States	
Win	1–0	Andrew Boyle	TKO (punches)	Night of the Knockout 1	March 10, 2001	1	1:30	Boise, Idaho, United States	

== Professional boxing record ==
5 fights	1 win	3 losses
By knockout	1	0
By decision	0	3
Draws	1	

No.	Result	Record	Opponent	Type	Round, time	Date	Location	Notes
5	Loss	1–3–1	(United States) Darmani Rock	UD	4	6 Aug 2016	(United States) Oracle Arena, Oakland, California, US	
4	Draw	1–2–1	(Australia) Trent Rawlins	UD	4	9 Jun 2016	(United States) The Hangar, Costa Mesa, California, US	
3	Loss	1–2	(United States) Jonathan Rice	UD	4	5 May 2016	(United States) Irvine, California, US	
2	Win	1–1	(United States) James Kirby	KO	1 (4), 1:15	23 Jan 2016	(United States) Marriott on Broadway, Oakland, California, US	
1	Loss	0–1	(United States) Brian Torzenski	UD	4	17 Jan 2003	(United States) Bank of America Center, Boise, Idaho, US	

== Bare knuckle record ==
Professional record breakdown
2 matches	0 wins	2 losses
By knockout	0	2
By decision	0	0
Draws	0	

Res.	Record	Opponent	Method	Event	Date	Round	Time	Location	Notes
Loss	0–2	Gustavo Trujillo	KO (punches)	BKFC 22	November 12, 2021	1	0:34	Miami, Florida, United States	
Loss	0–1	Bobo O'Bannon	TKO (retirement)	Toe the Line 2	October 16, 2020	2	2:00	Plant City, Florida, United States	

== See also ==
- List of male mixed martial artists
