= Strikeforce: Fedor vs. Werdum =

Mixed martial arts event in 2010

- The poster for Strikeforce: Fedor vs. Werdum
- Promotion: Strikeforce
- Date: June 26, 2010
- Venue: HP Pavilion
- City: San Jose, California, United States
- Attendance: 11,757
- Total gate: $1,066,739

Event chronology
Strikeforce: Los Angeles	Strikeforce: Fedor vs. Werdum	Strikeforce: Houston

Strikeforce/M-1 Global: Fedor vs. Werdum was a mixed martial arts event held by Strikeforce in association with M-1 Global on June 26, 2010 at HP Pavilion in San Jose, California.

== Background ==
Josh Thomson was originally set to face Lyle Beerbohm at this event. On May 21, Thomson announced that Beerbohm was injured in his previous fight with Vítor Ribeiro, and will be replaced. Pat Healy ended up facing Thomson.

M-1 Global fighter Magomed Shikhshabekov was scheduled to face American Kickboxing Academy fighter Ron Keslar. However, Shikhshabekov was forced off the card due to visa issues, and was replaced by Chris Cope.

The event drew an estimated 492,000 viewers on Showtime.

== Results ==
Main Card
Weight class				Method	Round	Time	Notes
Heavyweight	Fabrício Werdum	def.	Fedor Emelianenko	Submission (triangle armbar)	1	1:09
Women's Featherweight	Cris Cyborg (c)	def.	Jan Finney	TKO (knee to the body)	2	2:56	(Note: For the Strikeforce Women's Featherweight Championship. Cyborg was docked one point for punching Finney in the back of the head.)
Middleweight	Cung Le	def.	Scott Smith	KO (spinning back kick and punches)	2	1:46
Lightweight	Josh Thomson	def.	Pat Healy	Submission (rear-naked choke)	3	4:27
Preliminary Card
Lightweight	Bobby Stack	def.	Derrick Burnsed	Decision (split) (29–28, 27–30, 29–28)	3	5:00
Middleweight	Yancy Medeiros	def.	Gareth Joseph	KO (punches)	2	1:19
Welterweight	Bret Bergmark	def.	Vagner Rocha	Decision (unanimous) (29–28, 30–27, 30–26)	3	5:00
Middleweight	Chris Cope	def.	Ron Keslar	TKO (head kick and punches)	2	4:32

== Reported payout ==
The following is a list of fighter salaries as provided by the California State Athletic Commission. The figures do not include deductions for items such as insurance, licenses and taxes. Additionally, the figures do not include money paid by sponsors, which can often be a substantial portion of a fighter's income.

- Fabrício Werdum: $100,000 (no win bonus) def. Fedor Emelianenko: $400,000
- Cung Le: $100,000 (no win bonus) def. Scott Smith: $55,000
- Cris Cyborg: $35,000 ($15,000 win bonus plus $5,000 champion bonus) def. Jan Finney: $6,000
- Josh Thomson: $60,000 (no win bonus) def. Pat Healy: $8,000
- Chris Cope: $3,000 ($1,000 win bonus) def. Ron Keslar: $1,500
- Bret Bergmark: $3,000 ($1,500 win bonus) def. Vagner Rocha: $2,500
- Yancy Medeiros: $8,000 ($4,000 win bonus) def. Gareth Joseph: $2,000
- Bobby Stack: $2,800 ($1,500 win bonus) def. Derrick Burnsed: $2,000

== Notes ==
Strikeforce commentator, former UFC Light Heavyweight champion, and former King of Pancrase, Frank Shamrock announced his retirement from Mixed Martial Arts at this event.

== See also ==
- Strikeforce (mixed martial arts)
- List of Strikeforce champions
- List of Strikeforce events
- 2010 in Strikeforce
