= Strikeforce: Marquardt vs. Saffiedine =

Strikeforce mixed martial arts event in 2013

- The poster for Strikeforce: Marquardt vs. Saffiedine
- Promotion: Strikeforce
- Date: January 12, 2013
- Venue: Chesapeake Energy Arena
- City: Oklahoma City, Oklahoma, United States

Event chronology
Strikeforce: Cormier vs. Mir	Strikeforce: Marquardt vs. Saffiedine

Strikeforce: Marquardt vs. Saffiedine was the final mixed martial arts event held by Strikeforce. The event took place on January 12, 2013 at the Chesapeake Energy Arena in Oklahoma City, Oklahoma. The event aired live on Showtime.

== Background ==
This was the final event for Strikeforce before the organization was folded and merged with the UFC.

Luke Rockhold was scheduled to defend his Strikeforce Middleweight Championship for the last time against Lorenz Larkin at this event, but was forced off the card due to injuries. Larkin was instead matched up with former champion Ronaldo Souza in late November, but on December 20, it was announced that UFC middleweight Ed Herman would be facing Souza instead, making him the only person to cross over to fight in Strikeforce while still under a UFC contract.

Gilbert Melendez was scheduled to defend his Strikeforce Lightweight Championship at this event against Pat Healy, but he too was forced out of the bout with an injury. Instead, Healy was matched up with Jorge Masvidal, but after Masvidal suffered a back injury, he was replaced in the Healy bout with promotional newcomer Kurt Holobaugh. The Healy/Masvidal fight would later be rescheduled for UFC on FOX 11 in April 2014, over a year after their move to the UFC after the Strikeforce merger, where Masvidal won via unanimous decision.

AXS TV personality and Inside MMA reporter Ron Kruck handled commentary at this event in place of Mauro Ranallo, who was absent due to a private family matter. Kruck had previously done backstage interviews for Strikeforce preliminary cards broadcast on AXS TV when it was still known as HDNet.

== Results ==
Main card (Showtime)
Weight class				Method	Round	Time	Notes
Welterweight	Tarec Saffiedine	def.	Nate Marquardt (c)	Decision (unanimous) (48-47, 49-46, 49-46)	5	5:00	(Note: For the Strikeforce Welterweight Championship.)
Heavyweight	Daniel Cormier	def.	Dion Staring	TKO (punches)	2	4:02
Heavyweight	Josh Barnett	def.	Nandor Guelmino	Submission (arm triangle choke)	1	2:11
Light Heavyweight	Gegard Mousasi	def.	Mike Kyle	Submission (rear-naked choke)	1	4:09
Catchweight (194 lbs)	Ronaldo Souza	def.	Ed Herman	Submission (kimura)	1	3:10
Preliminary card (Showtime Extreme)
Lightweight	Ryan Couture	def.	K. J. Noons	Decision (split) (29-28, 27-30, 29-28)	3	5:00
Middleweight	Tim Kennedy	def.	Trevor Smith	Submission (guillotine choke)	3	1:36
Lightweight	Pat Healy	def.	Kurt Holobaugh	Decision (unanimous) (29-28, 30-27, 30-27)	3	5:00
Middleweight	Roger Gracie	def.	Anthony Smith	Submission (arm triangle choke)	2	3:16
Postliminary card (unaired)
Lightweight	Adriano Martins	def.	Jorge Gurgel	Decision (unanimous) (30-27, 29-28, 29-28)	3	5:00
Lightweight	Estevan Payan	def.	Mike Bravo	TKO (punches)	2	4:01

== Reported payout ==
The following is the reported payout to the fighters as reported to the Oklahoma State Athletic Commission. It does not include sponsor money or any other bonuses.

- Tarec Saffiedine: $39,000 (includes $19,500 win bonus) def. Nate Marquardt: $40,000
- Daniel Cormier: $120,000 (includes $60,000 win bonus) def. Dion Staring: $8,000
- Josh Barnett : $250,000 (no win bonus) def. Nandor Guelmino: $12,000
- Gegard Mousasi: $175,000 (no win bonus) def. Mike Kyle: $25,000
- Ronaldo Souza: $100,500 (includes $28,000 win bonus) def. Ed Herman: $34,000
- Ryan Couture : $22,000 (includes $7,000 win bonus) def. K. J. Noons: $41,000
- Tim Kennedy : $80,000 (includes $25,000 win bonus) def. Trevor Smith: $8,000
- Pat Healy: $42,000 (includes $15,000 win bonus) def. Kurt Holobaugh: $9,000
- Roger Gracie: $94,000 (includes $47,000 win bonus) def. Anthony Smith: $10,000
- Adriano Martins : $16,000 (includes $8,000 win bonus) def. Jorge Gurgel: $10,000
- Estevan Payan : $12,000 (includes $6,000 win bonus) def. Michael Bravo: $6,000
