= Strikeforce (mixed martial arts) =

Defunct promoter based in California

- Type: Private
- Industry: Mixed martial arts promotion
- Founded: 1985
- Founder: Scott Coker
- Defunct: 2013
- Successor: Ultimate Fighting Championship
- Headquarters: San Jose, California, United States
- Owner: TKO Group Holdings
- Website: strikeforce.com

Strikeforce was an American mixed martial arts and kickboxing organization based in San Jose, California, that operated from 1985 to 2013. It was headed by CEO Scott Coker.

Its live events and competitions have been shown on CBS, debuting on November 7, 2009, and Showtime in the United States. Internationally, Strikeforce events have been broadcast Super Channel in Canada, Primetime in the United Kingdom, SKY PerfecTV! in Japan, HBO Plus in Brazil, Space in Latin America and the Caribbean, and on the American Forces Network.

In early 2011, Strikeforce was purchased by American Ultimate Fighting Championship owner Zuffa LLC, which eventually closed the promotion and brought the remaining fighter contracts into the UFC roster.

== History ==
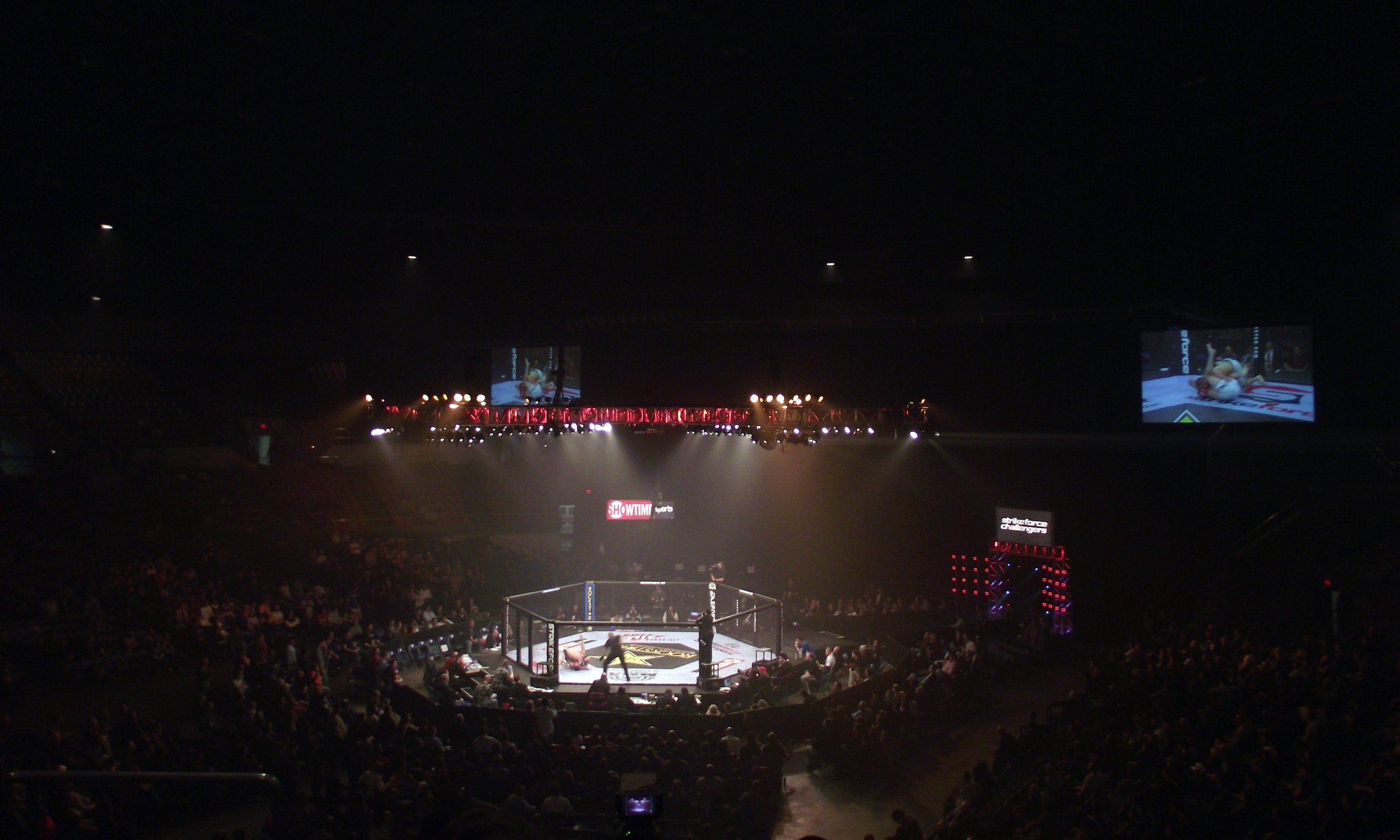
Strikeforce Challengers 13 in Nashville, Tennessee

Founded as a kickboxing organization, Strikeforce later expanded into mixed martial arts. Its first MMA event, Strikeforce: Shamrock vs. Gracie, was held on March 10, 2006, at the HP Pavilion in San Jose, California. The event was California's first regulated MMA event and broke the previous record for the largest audience at an MMA event in North America, with 18,265 in attendance. The record was since broken by UFC 129. Strikeforce spent much of its early days as a regional promotion, but one that had a higher level of talent than most promotions due to its California base. It made its television debut with Strikeforce: Shamrock vs. Baroni, a co-branded event with the EliteXC promotion which featured the Strikeforce-contracted Frank Shamrock in its main event.

In February 2008, Strikeforce, in conjunction with Brian Halquist Productions, held its first event outside California with Strikeforce: At The Dome at the Tacoma Dome in Tacoma, Washington. This was also the promotion's first show on cable television, as it was aired as part of the HDNet Fights block. Starting in 2009, most Strikeforce events were held in other states (15 in total), including 5 events in Las Vegas, Nevada from 2011-2012. They still ran multiple shows a year from HP Pavilion, as the owners of that building's main tenant, hockey's San Jose Sharks, had purchased a significant share in the promotion.

In March 2008, Strikeforce partnered with NBC to broadcast weekly highlight and fighter-profile series, Strikeforce on NBC from April 12. In February 2009, Strikeforce purchased several assets, including a video library and several fighter-contracts, including Nick Diaz, Jake Shields, Robbie Lawler and Scott Smith from ProElite, owner of the defunct EliteXC promotion. Days later it also announced it had taken over EliteXC's three-year broadcast deal with Showtime for up to 16 events per year, as well as a deal with CBS for an option to produce up to four events for them. In addition to Strikeforce's primary events being broadcast on Showtime, it also announced it would produce ShoMMA: Strikeforce Challengers, an event-series similar to ShoXC and ShoBox, where they would highlight up-and-coming fighters.

During August 2009, Strikeforce CEO Scott Coker announced that it had signed formal alliances with Japanese MMA-promotion Dream and Russian promotion M-1 Global. Coker said the partnership would allow for co-promotion and fighter exchanges for events both in the US and Japan to creating the best match ups possible that would not have existed before. As a result, Dream fighters such as Shinya Aoki, Tatsuya Kawajiri, Sergei Kharitonov, Melvin Manhoef, Jason Miller, Gegard Mousasi, Ronaldo Souza, Hiroyuki Takaya, and Marius Zaromskis competed in Strikeforce between 2009 & the partnership's end in 2011.

On August 15, 2009, Strikeforce events were available to be viewed online through the Showtime website. For a small cost, an online interactive event named "Strikeforce: All Access" could be streamed simultaneously with the live event, enabling the user multiple camera angles of the fights such as the "cage cam" exclusively offered by Showtime. A small camera was attached to the referee and fans were able to see from their perspective in real time. "Strikeforce: All Access" added other features such as pause and instant replay. This was not the first time Strikeforce events were streamed on the Showtime website but was the first time the live stream was available to audiences and internet users outside the United States.

=== Arrival of Fedor Emelianenko ===
On August 3, 2009, former Pride and reigning WAMMA Heavyweight Champion Fedor Emelianenko signed a 3-fight contract with Strikeforce, with events he competed on co-promoted by his promotional team M-1 Global. On November 7, 2009, he made his Strikeforce debut at Strikeforce: Fedor vs. Rogers on the promotion's first nationally televised card on CBS. Emelianenko faced Brett Rogers, and won via knockout in the 2nd round. Emelianenko proved to be a huge rating draw, bringing in just under 5.5 million viewers.

Emelianenko's next fight was at Strikeforce: Fedor vs. Werdum, where he suffered his first loss in 10 years to Fabrício Werdum via submission. Emelianenko next fought as part of the Strikeforce Heavyweight World Grand Prix Tournament, losing again to Antônio Silva via doctor stoppage. Emelianenko was battered by Silva during the second round, causing his right eye to swell shut.

After exiting the tournament, Emelianenko last competed against Strikeforce light heavyweight champion Dan Henderson in a heavyweight superfight, losing via first-round knockout. After the loss, Emelianenko left the promotion to finish his career overseas. Despite his three-fight losing streak to end his Strikeforce run, all of his appearances for the promotion attracted over 500,000 viewers, among the highest ratings in Strikeforce's history on Showtime.

=== Purchase by Zuffa LLC ===
On March 12, 2011, Dana White revealed on AOL to Ariel Helwani that Zuffa, LLC, the parent company of the UFC, had purchased Strikeforce. White went on to explain that Strikeforce will operate as an independent promotion and that Scott Coker would continue to run the promotion. Strikeforce CEO Scott Coker announced the return of Fedor Emelianenko on an unspecified July or August event and said that the Zuffa-owned company would continue to co-promote with M-1 Global. Following the purchase, the UFC signed many of Strikeforce's top stars and champions, such as Jason Miller, Nick Diaz, Dan Henderson, Alistair Overeem, Luke Rockhold, and Cung Le.

Under Zuffa's ownership, Strikeforce made a number of changes, including reinstating elbow strikes previously barred in Strikeforce, dissolving the men's weight classes below lightweight, and ceasing promotion of amateur undercard bouts. After an extension was reached with Showtime to continue Strikeforce through 2012, the promotion's heavyweight division (sans Heavyweight Grand Prix finalists) was merged into the UFC, and the promotion's Challengers series was ended.

The final Strikeforce show was Strikeforce: Marquardt vs. Saffiedine on January 12, 2013, after which the promotion was dissolved and all fighter contracts were either ended or absorbed into the UFC. Notable fighters included Nick Diaz, Daniel Cormier, Josh Barnett, Ronda Rousey and Luke Rockhold. Following a brief period away from fight promotion, former Strikeforce CEO Scott Coker would then go on to join Bellator MMA in June 2014, replacing Bjorn Rebney as its new president.

Many Strikeforce fighters went on to become UFC Champions. In 2015, after Luke Rockhold defeated Chris Weidman to become UFC Middleweight Champion, former Strikeforce fighters owned UFC Titles at Heavyweight, Light Heavyweight, Middleweight, and Welterweight at the same time.

== Rules ==
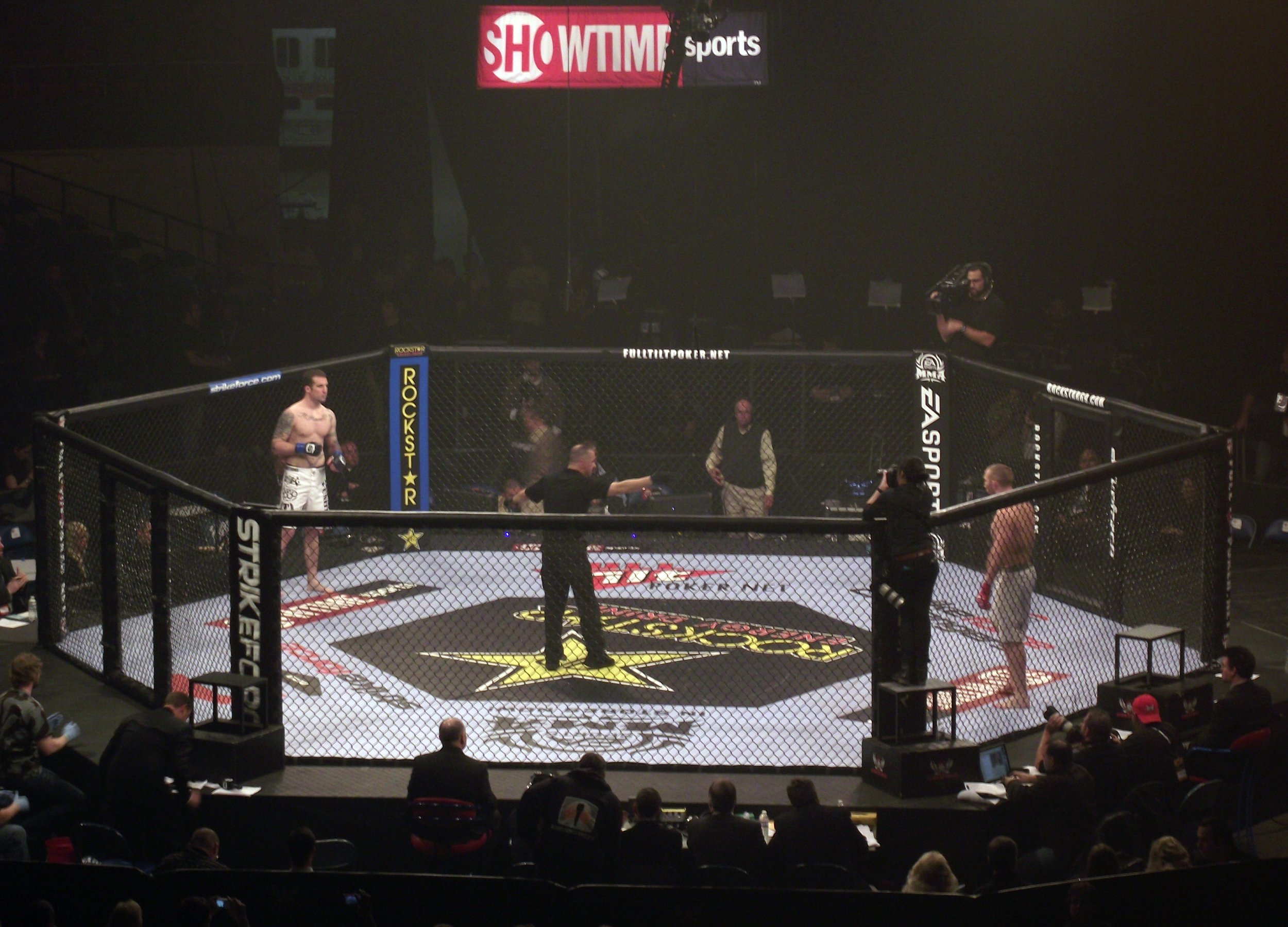
Two fighters get ready prior to their bout

At the time of its closure, Strikeforce employed the Unified Rules of Mixed Martial Arts, and was fought on a hexagonal cage, as opposed to UFC's octagonal cage (The Octagon). Ordinary matches consisted of three five-minute rounds, while championship matches were five five-minute rounds. All rounds had a one-minute break between them. Prior to the acquisition by Zuffa, Strikeforce did not allow elbows to the head of a grounded opponent.

Prior to June 2009, all women's bouts in Strikeforce consisted of three three-minute rounds as opposed to the men's five-minute rounds. However, on June 16, 2009, Strikeforce announced that it had received approval from the Washington and California State Athletic Commissions to use five-minute rounds for all women's bouts, including five five-minute rounds for its championship bouts.

=== Weight divisions ===
Weight class name	Upper limit	
Weight class name	Before 2009	After 2009
Bantamweight	—	135 lb (61.2 kg)
Featherweight	145 lb (65.8 kg)	145 lb (65.8 kg)
Lightweight	160 lb (72.6 kg)	155 lb (70.3 kg)
Welterweight	175 lb (79.4 kg)	170 lb (77.1 kg)
Middleweight	190 lb (86.2 kg)	185 lb (83.9 kg)
Light Heavyweight	205 lb (93.0 kg)	205 lb (93.0 kg)
Heavyweight	Unlimited	265 lb (120.2 kg)

=== Judging criteria ===
The ten-point must system was in effect for all fights; three judges scored each round and the winner of each received ten points, the loser nine points or fewer. If the round was even, both fighters received ten points. In New Jersey, the fewest points a fighter could receive was 7, and in other states by custom no fighter received fewer than 8.

=== Match conduct ===
- After a verbal warning the referee could stop the fighters and stand them up if they reached a stalemate on the ground (where neither are in a dominant position or working towards one). This rule is codified in Nevada as the stand-up rule.
- If the referee paused the match, it was resumed with the fighters in their prior positions.
- Grabbing the cage brought a verbal warning, followed by an attempt by the referee to release the grab by pulling on the grabbing hand. If that attempt failed or if the fighter continued to hold the cage, the referee could charge a foul.
- Under unified rules, antics were permitted before events to add to excitement and allow fighters to express themselves, but abusive language during combat was prohibited.

== Strikeforce events ==
As of Strikeforce: Marquardt vs. Saffiedine, which occurred on January 12, 2013, there have been 63 Strikeforce events held, including 20 in the promotion's Challengers series.

== Strikeforce Grand Prix ==
Strikeforce held tournaments in the men's heavyweight division from 2011–2012, and one-night tournaments in the men's middleweight divisions in November 2007 and the women's bantamweight division in August 2010. They were won respectively by Daniel Cormier, Jorge Santiago, and Miesha Tate.

== Final champions ==
Men's division	Upper weight limit	Champion
Heavyweight	265 lb (120 kg; 18.9 st)	(Netherlands) Alistair Overeem
Light heavyweight	205 lb (93 kg; 14.6 st)	(United States) Dan Henderson
Middleweight	185 lb (84 kg; 13.2 st)	(United States) Luke Rockhold
Welterweight	170 lb (77 kg; 12 st)	(Belgium) Tarec Saffiedine
Lightweight	155 lb (70 kg; 11.1 st)	(United States) Gilbert Melendez
Women's division	Upper weight limit	Champion
Featherweight	145 lb (66 kg; 10.4 st)	(Brazil) Cris Cyborg
Bantamweight	135 lb (61 kg; 9.6 st)	(United States) Ronda Rousey

== Strikeforce records ==
Record	Fighter	Number
Most Bouts	(United States) Josh Thomson	13
Most Wins	(United States) Gilbert Melendez	11
Most Finishes	(United States) Cung Le (United States) Luke Rockhold	7
Most Knockouts	(United States) Cung Le	7
Most Submissions	(United States) Luke Rockhold	5
Most Title Defenses	(United States) Gilbert Melendez	6 (including 1 defense of interim title)
Most Consecutive Title Defenses	(United States) Ronald Belliveau	4
Most Title Reigns	(United States) Gilbert Melendez	2
Most Wins in Title Fights	(United States) Gilbert Melendez	9 (including 2 interim title wins)

== In other media ==
=== Video games ===
- EA Sports MMA was released in 2010 featuring Strikeforce fighters and branding, along with fictional global MMA organizations. This was the promotion's only video game, and Electronic Arts now produces the UFC video game franchise.

=== Action figures ===
Figures were available from the company Round 5. A series of their figures includes Cung Le and Gina Carano. The Cung Le figure was released at the 2009 San Diego Comic Convention. An exclusive special version of the Cung Le figurine was released thereafter in which he has different colored shorts and design.

== See also ==
- List of Strikeforce alumni
- List of Strikeforce champions
- List of Strikeforce events
