= Ousmane Thomas Diagne =

French mixed martial arts fighter

Thomas Diagne
- Born: Ousmane Thomas Diagne; September 3, 1983 (age 43); Paris, France
- Other names: No Mas
- Nationality: French
- Height: 6 ft 1 in (1.85 m)
- Weight: 156 lb (71 kg; 11.1 st)
- Division: Lightweight
- Reach: 76.0 in (193 cm)
- Style: Sanshou
- Fighting out of: San Jose, California, United States
- Team: Cung Le's Universal Strength Headquarters; American Kickboxing Academy
- Years active: 2009–present

Mixed martial arts record
- Total: 15
- Wins: 6
- By knockout: 4
- By decision: 2
- Losses: 8
- By knockout: 5
- By submission: 2
- By decision: 1
- Draws: 1

Other information
- Mixed martial arts record from Sherdog

Ousmane Thomas Diagne is a French former professional mixed martial artist who competed from 2009 to 2017. He formerly fought in the lightweight division for Bellator, Strikeforce, and Tachi Palace Fights.

== Background ==
Diagne, who is from France, is a longtime practitioner of Sanshou, a Chinese form of kickboxing, and has won six titles in the sport. Diagne transitioned into mixed martial arts, under the tutelage of Cung Le.

== Mixed martial arts career ==
=== Strikeforce ===
Diagne made his professional mixed martial arts debut on May 15, 2009 at Strikeforce Challengers: Evangelista vs. Aina against Kaleo Kwan. Diagne won via unanimous decision.

He made his next appearance on November 6, 2009 at Strikeforce Challengers: Gurgel vs. Evangelista against Merritt Warren. Diagne lost via submission in the first round.

Diagne then fought at Strikeforce Challengers: del Rosario vs. Mahe on July 23, 2010, facing off against Caros Fodor and lost via unanimous decision.

At Strikeforce Challengers: Beerbohm vs. Healy on February 18, 2011, Diagne fought Aaron Franco and lost via knockout in the first round.

=== Independent promotions ===
Diagne left Strikeforce with a 1-3 record, and proceeded to go on a four-fight winning streak, before losing his last fight to Brandon Ricetti on June 28, 2014, via rear-naked choke.

== Mixed martial arts record ==
Professional record breakdown
15 matches	6 wins	8 losses
By knockout	4	5
By submission	0	2
By decision	2	1
Draws	1	

Res.	Record	Opponent	Method	Event	Date	Round	Time	Location	Notes
Loss	6–8–1	Fabricio Guerreiro	TKO (punches)	URCC 32: Fury	September 30, 2017	3	2:51	Lincoln, California, United States	For URCC Lightweight Championship.
Loss	6–7–1	Te'Jovan Edwards	TKO (head kick and punches)	Tachi Palace Fights 32	August 3, 2017	1	2:27	Lemoore, California, United States	
Win	6–6–1	Antonio Roberto	Decision (unanimous)	Conquer FC 3	March 18, 2017	3	5:00	Richmond, California, United States	
Loss	5–6–1	Mark Dickman	TKO (punches)	Bellator 154	May 14, 2016	3	3:05	San Jose, California, United States	
Loss	5–5–1	Erick Sanchez	TKO (punches)	Bellator 147	December 4, 2015	3	1:22	San Jose, California, United States	
Draw	5–4–1	Mike Malott	Draw (majority)	Bellator MMA & Glory: Dynamite 1	September 19, 2015	3	5:00	San Jose, California, United States	
Loss	5–4	Brandon Ricetti	Submission (rear-naked choke)	WFC 10: Diagne vs. Ricetti	June 28, 2014	2	1:10	Sacramento, California, United States	
Win	5–3	Dominic Clark	KO (head kick)	WFC 9: Mitchell vs. Jara	April 26, 2014	1	2:00	Sacramento, California, United States	
Win	4–3	Brad McDonald	TKO (doctor stoppage)	TWC 17: Conflict	June 21, 2013	1	5:00	Porterville, California, United States	
Win	3–3	David Douglas	KO (punch)	Red Canvas: Art of Submission 3	October 27, 2012	1	3:03	Stockton, California, United States	
Win	2–3	Alexander Trevino	TKO (kick to the body)	Red Canvas: Art of Submission 1	September 15, 2012	3	3:39	San Jose, California, United States	
Loss	1–3	Aaron Franco	KO (punches)	Strikeforce Challengers: Beerbohm vs. Healy	February 18, 2011	1	4:22	Cedar Park, Texas, United States	
Loss	1–2	Caros Fodor	Decision (unanimous)	Strikeforce Challengers: del Rosario vs. Mahe	July 23, 2010	3	5:00	Everett, Washington, United States	
Loss	1–1	Merritt Warren	Submission (inverted heel hook)	Strikeforce Challengers: Gurgel vs. Evangelista	November 6, 2009	1	3:49	Fresno, California, United States	
Win	1–0	Kaleo Kwan	Decision (unanimous)	Strikeforce Challengers: Evangelista vs. Aina	May 15, 2009	3	5:00	Fresno, California, United States	
