= Cory Devela =

American mixed martial arts fighter

- Born: May 8, 1984 (age 42); Bonney Lake, Washington, U.S.
- Other names: The One
- Height: 6 ft 2 in (1.88 m)
- Weight: 170 lb (77 kg; 12 st)
- Division: Welterweight; Middleweight
- Fighting out of: Chicago, Illinois
- Team: Victory Athletics
- Years active: 2003-2016

Mixed martial arts record
- Total: 23
- Wins: 16
- By knockout: 5
- By submission: 6
- By decision: 5
- Losses: 7
- By knockout: 2
- By submission: 4
- By decision: 1

Other information
- Mixed martial arts record from Sherdog

Cory Devela (born August 5, 1984) is an American mixed martial artist who last competed in 2016.

== Background ==
Devela began wrestling in elementary school and continued through middle and high school. After graduating, Devela attended Yakima Valley Community College on a wrestling scholarship. Devela fell into mixed martial arts while in college. He has been fighting professionally since 2004. Devela trains with veteran fighter Dennis "Superman" Hallman at Victory Athletics in Yelm, Wash.

== Mixed martial arts career ==
=== Strikeforce ===
After defeating by unanimous decision "The Ultimate Fighter 1 " fighter and WEC veteran Lodune Sincaid Devela was signed by Strikeforce. And at the debut in middleweight slammed UFC veteran Joe Riggs. But in the next he was knocked out by Terry Martin. At June 19 of 2009 he loss to Luke Rockhold by rear naked choke. After this fight Devela dropped to welterweight and met with Bobby Voelker at Strikeforce Challengers: del Rosario vs. Mahe and lost by split decision.

== Championships and accomplishments ==
- High Roller Productions
  - HRP Middleweight Championship (One time)
- Sparta Combat League
  - SCL Middleweight Championship (One time; current)

== Mixed martial arts record ==
Professional record breakdown
23 matches	16 wins	7 losses
By knockout	5	2
By submission	6	4
By decision	5	1

Res.	Record	Opponent	Method	Event	Date	Round	Time	Location	Notes
Loss	16–7	Louis Taylor	Technical submission (guillotine choke)	WSOF 29	March 12, 2016	1	0:29	Greeley, Colorado, United States	
Win	16–6	Adam Stroup	Decision (unanimous)	SCL: Rumble on the Mountain	August 22, 2015	3	5:00	Loveland, Colorado, United States	Won the SCL Middleweight Championship.
Win	15–6	Nick Ring	Decision (unanimous)	School of Hard Knocks 44	June 26, 2015	3	5:00	Calgary, Alberta, Canada	
Win	14–6	Jared Torgeson	Submission (rear-naked choke)	SCL 41: Army vs. Marines Washington	February 21, 2015	3	N/A	Everett, Washington, United States	
Win	13–6	David Anderson	Submission (short choke)	Rumble on the Ridge 29	October 25, 2014	1	2:12	Snoqualmie, Washington, United States	
Loss	12–6	Brent Knopp	TKO (punches)	CageSport 28	December 7, 2013	4	2:37	Tacoma, Washington, United States	
Win	12–5	Byron Sutton	TKO (punches)	CageSport 27	October 5, 2013	1	3:11	Tacoma, Washington, United States	
Loss	11–5	Bobby Voelker	Decision (split)	Strikeforce Challengers: del Rosario vs. Mahe	July 23, 2010	3	5:00	Everett, Washington, United States	Welterweight debut
Loss	11–4	Luke Rockhold	Submission (rear-naked choke)	Strikeforce Challengers: Villasenor vs. Cyborg	June 19, 2009	1	0:30	Kent, Washington, United States	
Loss	11–3	Terry Martin	KO (punch)	Strikeforce: At The Mansion II	September 20, 2008	3	2:08	Los Angeles, California, United States	
Win	11–2	Dan Molina	Decision (unanimous)	XCC 6: Western Threat	April 5, 2008	3	5:00	Reno, Nevada, United States	
Win	10–2	Joe Riggs	TKO (slam)	Strikeforce: At The Dome	February 23, 2008	1	1:22	Tacoma, Washington, United States	Riggs injured ribs after a slam by Devela
Win	9–2	Lodune Sincaid	Decision (unanimous)	SF 21: Seasons Beatings	December 22, 2007	3	5:00	Portland, Oregon, United States	
Win	8–2	Tom Jones	TKO (punches)	HRP: Fight Night	November 16, 2007	1	2:02	Tulsa, Oklahoma, United States	Won the HRP Middleweight Championship
Win	7–2	John Krohn	Submission (kimura)	SF 20: Homecoming	October 27, 2007	2	N/A	Portland, Oregon, United States	
Win	6–2	Dave Knight	Submission (verbal)	XFC: Dome of Destruction 5	July 22, 2006	2	0:54	Yakima, Washington, United States	
Win	5–2	Nick Tyree	Submission (rear-naked choke)	XFC: Dome of Destruction 4	May 20, 2006	1	N/A	Tacoma, Washington, United States	
Win	4–2	Jeff Dietrich	Decision (unanimous)	USA MMA: Pacific Northwest Invitational 1	October 14, 2005	5	5:00	Tacoma, Washington, United States	
Loss	3–2	Ed Herman	Submission (armbar)	PFA: Pride and Fury	June 3, 2004	1	3:20	Worley, Idaho, United States	
Win	3–1	Adam Yohe	TKO (submission to punches)	USA MMA: Fight Time	March 20, 2004	1	1:02	Lakewood, Washington, United States	
Win	2–1	Matt Armstrong	TKO (punches)	FCFF: Rumble at the Roseland 12	March 20, 2004	2	1:49	Portland, Oregon, United States	
Win	1–1	Michael Perales	Submission	FCFA: Rumble in Sonoyta	March 6, 2004	1	2:08	Sonoyta, Mexico	
Loss	0–1	Matt Horwich	Submission (rear-naked choke)	PPKA: Ultimate Fight Night 2	September 6, 2003	2	1:24	Pasco, Washington, United States	
