= Ron Stallings =

American mixed martial arts fighter

- Born: Ronald Edward Stallings, Jr. January 25, 1983 (age 43); Durham, North Carolina, United States
- Other names: The Choir Boy
- Nationality: American
- Height: 6 ft 0 in (1.83 m)
- Weight: 184 lb (83 kg; 13.1 st)
- Division: Heavyweight; Middleweight
- Reach: 75.0 in (191 cm)
- Fighting out of: Camp Springs, Maryland, United States
- Team: Team Lloyd Irvin
- Rank: Black belt in Brazilian Jiu-Jitsu under Lloyd Irvin
- Years active: 2003-present

Mixed martial arts record
- Total: 24
- Wins: 15
- By knockout: 6
- By submission: 6
- By decision: 3
- Losses: 8
- By knockout: 3
- By submission: 1
- By decision: 3
- By disqualification: 1
- No contests: 1

Other information
- Mixed martial arts record from Sherdog

Ronald Edward "Ron" Stallings, Jr. (born February 25, 1983) is an American mixed martial artist who competes in the Middleweight division. A professional competitor since 2003, Stallings has also formerly competed for Strikeforce, Titan FC, and the UFC.

== Background ==
Stallings was born and raised in Durham, North Carolina and began training in martial arts at the age of seven. Stallings attended Joppatowne High School and later Morgan State University.

== Mixed martial arts career ==
=== Early career ===
Stallings began training in 2000 and made his professional MMA debut in July 2003. He competed primarily in regional promotions where he compiled a record of 12-6 with one no contest before signing with the UFC.

=== Strikeforce ===
With a record of 9-4 with one no contest, Stallings made his Strikeforce debut on July 22, 2011 at Strikeforce Challengers: Voelker vs. Bowling III against Adlan Amagov. Stallings lost via split decision.

=== Ultimate Fighting Championship ===
Stallings made his promotional debut as a short notice replacement against Uriah Hall on January 18, 2015 at UFC Fight Night 59, replacing an injured Louis Taylor. Hall won via TKO in the first round after knocking Stallings down with a punch and following up with several more on the ground. When Stallings returned to his feet, referee Herb Dean stopped the fight to check a cut that had opened up on Stallings' face, and the ringside doctor declared the cut too severe for Stallings to continue.

Stallings faced Justin Jones on April 4, 2015 at UFC Fight Night 63. Stallings won via unanimous decision.

Stallings faced Joe Riggs on September 5, 2015 at UFC 191. Stallings lost the bout via disqualification after he landed an illegal upkick, which rendered Riggs unable to continue. Subsequently, Stallings was released from the promotion.

=== Titan Fighting Championship ===
Stallings made his promotional debut against Rashaun Spencer on August 5, 2016 at Titan FC 40. Stallings won via split decision.

== Mixed martial arts record ==
Professional record breakdown
24 matches	15 wins	8 losses
By knockout	6	3
By submission	6	1
By decision	3	3
By disqualification	0	1
No contests	1	

Res.	Record	Opponent	Method	Event	Date	Round	Time	Location	Notes
Win	15–8 (1)	Nah-Shon Burrell	Decision (unanimous)	CES MMA 52	August 17, 2018	3	5:00	Lincoln, Rhode Island, United States	
Win	14–8 (1)	Rashaun Spencer	Decision (split)	Titan FC 40	August 5, 2016	3	5:00	Coral Gables, Florida, United States	
Loss	13–8 (1)	Joe Riggs	DQ (illegal upkick)	UFC 191	September 5, 2015	2	2:28	Las Vegas, Nevada, United States	
Win	13–7 (1)	Justin Jones	Decision (unanimous)	UFC Fight Night: Mendes vs. Lamas	April 4, 2015	3	5:00	Fairfax, Virginia, United States	
Loss	12–7 (1)	Uriah Hall	TKO (doctor stoppage)	UFC Fight Night: McGregor vs. Siver	January 18, 2015	1	3:37	Boston, Massachusetts, United States	
Loss	12–6 (1)	Tim Williams	Decision (unanimous)	CFFC 43: Webb vs. Good	November 1, 2014	5	5:00	Atlantic City, New Jersey, United States	For the vacant CFFC Middleweight Championship.
Win	12–5 (1)	Joshua Williams	TKO (punches)	Warfare 12: Rise of the Champions	June 20, 2014	3	N/A	North Myrtle Beach, South Carolina, United States	
Win	11–5 (1)	Mike Massenzio	TKO (knee to the body)	Ring of Combat 42	September 14, 2012	1	4:03	Atlantic City, New Jersey, United States	Won the vacant ROC Middleweight Championship.
Win	10–5 (1)	Willie Smalls	Submission (rear-naked choke)	Black and Blue: Rebel Invasion 2	February 11, 2012	2	3:19	Tallapoosa, Georgia, United States	
Loss	9–5 (1)	Adlan Amagov	Decision (split)	Strikeforce Challengers: Voelker vs. Bowling III	July 22, 2011	3	5:00	Las Vegas, Nevada, United States	
Win	9–4 (1)	Joey Kirwan	Submission (triangle choke)	UWC 8: Judgment Day	May 22, 2010	2	0:52	Fairfax, Virginia, United States	
Win	8–4 (1)	Fred Weaver	TKO (punches)	Gameness Fighting Championship 6	February 20, 2010	2	0:12	Memphis, Tennessee, United States	
Loss	7–4 (1)	Damian Dantibo	TKO (head kick and punches)	UWC 6: Capital Punishment	April 25, 2009	1	0:13	Fairfax, Virginia, United States	
Win	7–3 (1)	Herbert Goodman	KO (knees)	UWC 5: Man O' War	February 21, 2009	1	4:56	Fairfax, Virginia, United States	
Win	6–3 (1)	Tony Sousa	TKO (punches)	UWC 4: Confrontation	October 11, 2008	2	1:02	Fairfax, Virginia, United States	
Loss	5–3 (1)	Timothy Woods	KO (slam)	UWC 3: Invasion	April 26, 2008	1	1:25	Fairfax, Virginia, United States	
Win	5–2 (1)	Eric Lambert	Submission (guillotine choke)	CSC 24: The Proving Ground	March 15, 2008	1	2:41	Richmond, Virginia, United States	
Win	4–2 (1)	Bill Frazier	TKO (punches)	Combat Sport Challenge	September 29, 2007	1	3:58	Richmond, Virginia, United States	
Loss	3–2 (1)	Dante Rivera	Decision (unanimous)	Reality Fighting 11	February 11, 2006	3	4:00	Atlantic City, New Jersey, United States	For the RF Middleweight Championship.
NC	3–1 (1)	Ted Govola	No Contest	Mass Destruction 19	February 25, 2005	N/A	N/A	Boston, Massachusetts, United States	For the vacant MD Middleweight Championship.
Win	3–1	Randy Rowe	Submission (triangle choke)	Mass Destruction 16	May 15, 2004	1	4:32	Boston, Massachusetts, United States	Return to Middleweight.
Win	2–1	Mike Varner	Submission (rear-naked choke)	Mass Destruction 14	December 13, 2003	1	N/A	Taunton, Massachusetts, United States	Heavyweight debut; won the vacant MD Heavyweight Championship.
Win	1–1	Rocco Giordano	Submission (armbar)	Reality Fighting 5	November 1, 2003	2	0:58	Atlantic City, New Jersey, United States	
Loss	0–1	Phillipe Nover	Submission (guillotine choke)	Reality Fighting 4	July 19, 2003	1	0:43	Bayonne, New Jersey, United States	

== See also ==
- List of male mixed martial artists
