= Adlan Amagov =

Russian mixed martial arts fighter

- Born: 30 October 1986 (age 39); Sunzhensky District, Chechen–Ingush ASSR, Russian SFSR, Soviet Union
- Other names: Borz; Chechen Van Damme
- Nationality: Russian
- Height: 180 cm (5 ft 11 in)
- Weight: 77 kg (170 lb; 12 st 2 lb)
- Division: Light Heavyweight (2007–2011); Middleweight (2011–2012); Welterweight (2013–2014)
- Reach: 197 cm (78 in)
- Style: ARB, Submission grappling
- Fighting out of: Fairfield, New Jersey, United States; Albuquerque, New Mexico, United States
- Team: Red Fury Fight Team; Jackson Wink MMA Academy; AMA Fight Club
- Trainer: Greg Jackson; Akhmed Musaev
- Rank: National Master of Sports in Sambo
- Years active: 2007–2013, 2016

Mixed martial arts record
- Total: 17
- Wins: 14
- By knockout: 8
- By submission: 1
- By decision: 5
- Losses: 2
- By knockout: 1
- By submission: 1
- Draws: 1

Other information
- Mixed martial arts record from Sherdog

Adlan Mairbekovich Amagov (Russian: Адлан Майрбекович Амагов; born 30 October 1986) is a Russian former mixed martial artist and kickboxer who most recently competed in the welterweight division of the Ultimate Fighting Championship. A professional competitor from 2007 to 2016, Amagov also formerly competed for Strikeforce and is the former Unifight World Champion.

== Background ==
Originally from the small village of Sernovodsk in Chechnya, Amagov was raised in a war-torn country and in 1994 when he was eight years old, Amagov's school was destroyed. Eventually, he relocated to Moscow, where he began training in Combat Sambo with Fedor Emelianenko and Alexander Emelianenko. In June 2007, Amagov made the transition into mixed martial arts.

== Mixed martial arts career ==
=== Early career ===
Amagov made his professional mixed martial arts debut in November 2007 in Russia. He lost his debut bout via submission, but soon amassed a record of 8–1–1 with most of his fights taking place in the ProFC promotion. His brothers Musa Amagov and Beslan Amagov are also professional MMA fighters.

Amagov drew considerable attention in 2010 when a video of his spinning hook kick knockout of Maskhat Akhmetov became popular on several MMA message boards and news sites.

He is managed by Sam Kardan and Mike Constantino of MVC Management.

=== Strikeforce ===
In the summer of 2011, Adlan Amagov signed with Zuffa and made his U.S. debut at Strikeforce Challengers: Bowling vs. Voelker III against Ron Stallings. Amagov won the fight via split decision.

Amagov was successful in his second bout for Strikeforce as he defeated veteran Anthony Smith via KO in the first round at Strikeforce Challengers: Britt vs. Sayers.

Following his two wins, Amagov made his debut on a main card at Strikeforce: Rockhold vs. Jardine on 7 January 2012. He faced former EliteXC Middleweight Champion Robbie Lawler in the co-main event and lost the fight via TKO (flying knee and punches) early in the first round.

Amagov returned to the promotion on 18 August 2012 at Strikeforce: Rousey vs. Kaufman. He faced Keith Berry at the event and won via TKO early in the first round after a side kick to the knee and punches on the ground.

=== Ultimate Fighting Championship ===
On 19 January 2013, it was revealed that Amagov had signed to fight for the UFC.

Amagov made his promotional and Welterweight debut against fellow newcomer and former Strikeforce veteran Chris Spång on 6 April 2013 at UFC on Fuel TV 9. Amagov dominated the fight from start to finish, earning a unanimous decision victory.

Amagov faced TJ Waldburger on 19 October 2013 at UFC 166. He won the fight via knockout in the first round.

Amagov was expected to face Jason High on 15 January 2014 at UFC Fight Night 35. However, Amagov pulled out of the bout due to injury and was replaced by promotional newcomer Beneil Dariush. After more than a year of absence from the sport, BloodyElbow editor Karim Zidan stated that Amagov had "no interest" in returning to MMA, and that he wants to "watch his kids grow up and is tired of cutting weight".

=== MMA return ===
In August 2016, it was announced that Amagov would return to MMA competition. He faced Jungle Fight champion Dirlei Broenstrup on 21 August 2016 in Russia and won the fight via submission in the first round.

== Personal life ==
He is married and has a son. On 5 June 2017, Amagov was involved in a violent altercation between rival Chechen business associates in Western Moscow that left two people dead and six others injured. Amagov was accused of stabbing another man in the chest during the encounter.

Adlan Amagov
Medal record

Representing Russia

Grappling

NAGA 2011 World Championship
Silver medal – second place	2011 Boca Raton, Florida (United States)	-93kg

NAGA 2012 World Championship
Gold medal – first place	2012 Morristown, NJ (United States)	-84kg

== Championships and accomplishments ==
=== Unifight ===
- International Amateur Federation of Unifight
  - Unifight World Champion
  - Unifight Europe Champion

=== Grappling ===
- NAGA
  - NAGA Championship 2nd Place 2011
  - NAGA Championship 1st Place 2012

=== ARG (Army Hand-to-Hand Combat) ===
- Russian Union of Martial Arts
  - Russian Medalist MVD in Army Hand-to-Hand Combat.

== Mixed martial arts record ==
Professional record breakdown
17 matches	14 wins	2 losses
By knockout	8	1
By submission	1	1
By decision	5	0
Draws	1	

Res.	Record	Opponent	Method	Event	Date	Round	Time	Location	Notes
Win	14–2–1	Dirlei Broenstrup	Submission (armlock)	League S-70 - Plotforma 7th	21 August 2016	1	2:18	Sochi, Krasnodar Krai, Russia	Return to Light Heavyweight bout.
Win	13–2–1	TJ Waldburger	KO (punches)	UFC 166	19 October 2013	1	3:00	Houston, Texas, United States	
Win	12–2–1	Chris Spång	Decision (unanimous)	UFC on Fuel TV: Mousasi vs. Latifi	6 April 2013	3	5:00	Stockholm, Södermanland, Sweden	Welterweight debut.
Win	11–2–1	Keith Berry	TKO (leg kick and punches)	Strikeforce: Rousey vs. Kaufman	18 August 2012	1	0:48	San Diego, California, United States	
Loss	10–2–1	Robbie Lawler	TKO (flying knee and punches)	Strikeforce: Rockhold vs. Jardine	7 January 2012	1	1:48	Las Vegas, Nevada, United States	
Win	10–1–1	Anthony Smith	KO (punches)	Strikeforce Challengers: Britt vs. Sayers	18 November 2011	1	2:32	Las Vegas, Nevada, United States	
Win	9–1–1	Ron Stallings	Decision (split)	Strikeforce Challengers: Voelker vs. Bowling III	22 July 2011	3	5:00	Las Vegas, Nevada, United States	Middleweight debut.
Win	8–1–1	Evgeny Erokhin	TKO (head kick and punches)	Draka: Governor's Cup 2010	18 December 2010	1	2:28	Khabarovsk, Khabarovsk Krai, Russia	
Win	7–1–1	Aleksandar Radosavljevic	TKO (doctor stoppage)	ProFC: Union Nation Cup 8	1 October 2010	2	2:10	Odesa, Odesa Oblast, Ukraine	
Draw	6–1–1	Attila Vegh	Draw (unanimous)	APF: Azerbaijan vs. Europe	22 May 2010	3	5:00	Baku, Baku region, Azerbaijan	
Win	6–1	Shamil Tinagadjiev	Decision (unanimous)	ProFC: Commonwealth Cup	23 April 2010	2	5:00	Moscow, Moscow Oblast, Russia	
Win	5–1	Denys Liadovyi	TKO (punches)	ProFC: Union Nation Cup 5	13 February 2010	1	2:58	Nalchik, Kabardino-Balkar Republic, Russia	
Win	4–1	Maskhat Akhmetov	KO (spinning hook kick)	ProFC: Union Nation Cup 4	19 December 2009	1	0:17	Rostov-on-Don, Rostov Oblast, Russia	
Win	3–1	Gadzhimurad Antigulov	KO (punches)	ProFC: Union Nation Cup 2	25 September 2009	1	4:05	Rostov-on-Don, Rostov Oblast, Russia	
Win	2–1	Abbdullah Mahmud	Decision (unanimous)	ProFC: President Cup	25 October 2008	3	5:00	St. Petersburg, Leningrad Oblast, Russia	
Win	1–1	Ansar Chalangov	Decision (unanimous)	Perm Regional MMA Federation: MMA Professional Cup	25 April 2008	2	5:00	Perm, Perm Krai, Russia	
Loss	0–1	Aleksei Oleinik	Submission (ezekiel choke)	Perm Regional MMA Federation: MMA Professional Cup	23 November 2007	1	1:00	Perm, Perm Krai, Russia	

== See also ==
- List of current UFC fighters
- List of male mixed martial artists
