= Bobby Voelker =

American mixed martial arts fighter

- Born: Robert James Voelker; April 26, 1979 (age 47); Kansas City, Missouri, United States
- Other names: Vicious
- Height: 6 ft 0 in (1.83 m)
- Weight: 170 lb (77 kg; 12 st)
- Division: Welterweight
- Reach: 74 in (188 cm)
- Fighting out of: Kansas City, Missouri, United States
- Team: Finney's MMA; American Jujitsu; Glory MMA & Fitness
- Years active: 2006–present

Mixed martial arts record
- Total: 48
- Wins: 34
- By knockout: 27
- By decision: 7
- Losses: 14
- By knockout: 4
- By submission: 1
- By decision: 9

Other information
- Mixed martial arts record from Sherdog

Robert "Bobby" James Voelker (born April 26, 1979) is an American professional mixed martial artist competing in their Welterweight division. A professional competitor since 2006, Voelker has formerly competed for the UFC, Bellator MMA, Strikeforce, M-1 Global, and Titan FC.

== Background ==
Voelker is from Kansas City, Missouri, and attended Shawnee Mission South High School where he competed in football as well as swimming and diving. Voelker also got into many street fights, being charged with battery when he was 18 years old and began training in boxing and kickboxing late in high school. After graduating high school, Voelker briefly attended college before dropping out and eventually transitioned into a career in professional mixed martial arts.

== Mixed martial arts career ==
=== Early career ===
Voelker compiled an undefeated amateur record of 10–0 before making his professional MMA debut in 2006. He competed in events primarily in Iowa and Kansas, amassing a record of 20–7 before signing with Strikeforce.

=== Strikeforce ===
Voelker's debut took place on November 20, 2009 at Strikeforce Challengers: Woodley vs. Bears, where he faced off against WEC veteran Erik Apple, defeating Apple via TKO (punches) in the second round.

His second appearance took place at Strikeforce Challengers: Lindland vs. Casey, where he faced heavy-handed up-and-coming striker "Relentless" Roger Bowling. The fight ended in a technical decision in favor of Bowling due to an unintentional eye injury to Bowling.

He was next signed to face Cory Devela, who was on a two-fight slide, on July 23, 2010, at Strikeforce Challengers: del Rosario vs. Mahe. Devela easily took round one, swarming Voelker and turning the fight into a grappling match. The second and third rounds were a lot closer to call, with Devela mostly controlling Voelker in the clinch, but the split decision was awarded to Voelker, who remained in a dominant position for much of the final frames, landing shots from top position.

A rematch with Bowling took place at Strikeforce Challengers: Bowling vs. Voelker. Voelker won a very one-sided fight via technical knockout in the second round due to punches. Voelker and Bowling fought for a third time at Strikeforce Challengers: Voelker vs. Bowling III to create Strikeforce's first trilogy. Once again, Voelker dominated and out struck Bowling, thus winning the fight via TKO due to a knee in the second round.

=== Ultimate Fighting Championship ===
In January 2013, the Strikeforce organization was closed by its parent company Zuffa. A list of fighters scheduled to be brought over to the Ultimate Fighting Championship was released in mid-January and Voelker was included.

For his debut, Voelker faced Patrick Côté, who was making his Welterweight debut, on March 16, 2013 at UFC 158. Despite finishing strong and winning the third round, Voelker was unsuccessful in his debut, losing the back-and-forth fight via unanimous decision.

Voelker was briefly scheduled to face James Head on August 28, 2013 at UFC Fight Night 27. However, on July 11, it was announced that Voelker was tabbed as a replacement for Siyar Bahadurzada and face Robbie Lawler on July 27, 2013 at UFC on Fox 8. He lost the fight via knockout in the second round.

Voelker faced William Macário on December 28, 2013 at UFC 168. He lost the fight via unanimous decision.

Voelker faced Lance Benoist on June 7, 2014 at UFC Fight Night 42. He lost the back-and-forth fight via unanimous decision, and was subsequently released from the promotion.

=== Bellator MMA ===
After racking a 9–1 record on the regional circuit, Voelker signed with Bellator MMA in April 2019. He made his promotional debut against Sabah Homasi at Bellator 250 on October 29, 2020. He lost the fight via flying knee in the second round.

On May 3, 2021, it was announced that Voelker was no longer under contract with Bellator.

=== Return to regional circuit ===
After the one-off bout in Bellator, Voelker returned to Shamrock FC facing Josh Weston at Shamrock FC 332 on October 9, 2021. He won the bout via first-round knockout.

== Personal life ==
Aside from his career as a fighter, Voelker works in construction and is also a devout Catholic. During his UFC tenure, Voelker studied at Kansas City Kansas Community College to be a paramedic and eventually graduated.

== Championships and accomplishments ==
- Shamrock Fighting Championships
  - Shamrock FC Welterweight Championship (one time)

== Mixed martial arts record ==
Professional record breakdown
48 matches	34 wins	14 losses
By knockout	27	4
By submission	0	1
By decision	7	9

Res.	Record	Opponent	Method	Event	Date	Round	Time	Location	Notes
Win	34–14	Josh Weston	TKO (punches)	Shamrock FC 332	October 9, 2021	1	1:12	Kansas City, Missouri, United States	
Loss	33–14	Sabah Homasi	KO (flying knee and punches)	Bellator 250	October 29, 2020	2	0:20	Uncasville, Connecticut, United States	
Win	33–13	Cameron VanCamp	Decision (unanimous)	Shamrock FC 317	April 6, 2019	5	5:00	Kansas City, Missouri, United States	Won the vacant Shamrock FC Welterweight Championship.
Win	32–13	Darrius Flowers	TKO (punches)	Shamrock FC 313	December 8, 2018	2	2:00	Kansas City, Missouri, United States	Catchweight (175 lbs) bout.
Win	31–13	Justin DeMoney	TKO (submission to punches)	Shamrock FC 306	June 16, 2018	2	1:45	Kansas City, Missouri, United States	
Win	30–13	Bobby Emmons	TKO (punches)	Shamrock FC 302	February 3, 2018	1	4:16	Kansas City, Missouri, United States	
Loss	29–13	Zak Bucia	Decision (unanimous)	Shamrock FC 289	May 20, 2017	3	5:00	Kansas City, Missouri, United States	For the Shamrock FC Welterweight Championship.
Win	29–12	Kyle Kurtz	TKO (punches and elbows)	Shamrock FC 276	September 24, 2016	2	1:55	Kansas City, Missouri, United States	
Win	28–12	Raymond Gray	Decision (unanimous)	Shamrock Promotions: Assault	January 16, 2016	3	5:00	Kansas City, Missouri, United States	
Win	27–12	Mike Estus	TKO (punches)	Shamrock Promotions: Clash	September 26, 2015	1	1:27	Kansas City, Missouri, United States	
Win	26–12	Justin Gutherie	TKO (punches)	Shamrock Promotions: Heavy Artillery	March 7, 2015	3	3:09	Kansas City, Missouri, United States	Catchweight (174 lbs) bout.
Win	25–12	Cedric Marks	TKO (punches)	Shamrock Promotions: Onslaught	September 27, 2014	1	3:32	Kansas City, Missouri, United States	
Loss	24–12	Lance Benoist	Decision (unanimous)	UFC Fight Night: Henderson vs. Khabilov	June 7, 2014	3	5:00	Albuquerque, New Mexico, United States	
Loss	24–11	William Macário	Decision (unanimous)	UFC 168	December 28, 2013	3	5:00	Las Vegas, Nevada, United States	
Loss	24–10	Robbie Lawler	KO (head kick and punches)	UFC on Fox: Johnson vs. Moraga	July 27, 2013	2	0:24	Seattle, Washington, United States	
Loss	24–9	Patrick Côté	Decision (unanimous)	UFC 158	March 16, 2013	3	5:00	Montreal, Quebec, Canada	
Win	24–8	Roger Bowling	TKO (knee and punches)	Strikeforce Challengers: Voelker vs. Bowling III	July 22, 2011	2	2:16	Las Vegas, Nevada, United States	
Win	23–8	Roger Bowling	TKO (punches)	Strikeforce Challengers: Bowling vs. Voelker	October 22, 2010	2	3:58	Fresno, California, United States	
Win	22–8	Cory Devela	Decision (split)	Strikeforce Challengers: del Rosario vs. Mahe	July 23, 2010	3	5:00	Everett, Washington, United States	
Loss	21–8	Roger Bowling	Technical decision (unanimous)	Strikeforce Challengers: Lindland vs. Casey	May 21, 2010	3	1:38	Portland, Oregon, United States	
Win	21–7	Erik Apple	TKO (punches)	Strikeforce Challengers: Woodley vs. Bears	November 29, 2009	2	1:23	Kansas City, Kansas, United States	
Loss	20–7	Brendan Seguin	Decision (unanimous)	Titan FC 14	October 2, 2009	3	5:00	Kansas City, Kansas, United States	
Win	20–6	Thomas Aaron	TKO (punches)	Extreme Fight Production	June 12, 2009	2	1:47	Kansas City, Kansas, United States	
Win	19–6	Dominic Brown	TKO (punches)	Titan FC 13	March 13, 2009	2	1:33	Kansas City, Kansas, United States	
Win	18–6	CJ Fernandes	TKO (punches)	X-Treme Fight 1	January 23, 2009	2	2:41	Kansas City, Missouri, United States	
Loss	17–6	Jacob Volkmann	Decision (unanimous)	VFC 25: Primetime	December 5, 2008	5	5:00	Council Bluffs, Iowa, United States	For the VFC Welterweight Championship.
Win	17–5	Amir Rahnavardi	Decision (unanimous)	M-1 Challenge 8: USA	October 29, 2008	3	5:00	Kansas City, Missouri, United States	
Win	16–5	Dominic Brown	TKO (punches)	VFC 24: Revolution	July 26, 2008	2	N/A	Council Bluffs, Iowa, United States	
Win	15–5	Ryan Braun	TKO (punches)	MCC 14: Pride or Fate	June 14, 2008	2	3:17	Urbandale, Iowa, United States	
Loss	14–5	Kevin Burns	KO (punch)	VFC 23: Validation	May 9, 2008	1	0:30	Council Bluffs, Iowa, United States	
Win	14–4	Nathan Looker	TKO (submission to punches)	World Cage Fighting Championships	April 5, 2008	1	1:34	Independence, Missouri, United States	
Loss	13–4	Joey Gorczynski	Decision (split)	Titan FC 11	March 22, 2008	3	N/A	Kansas City, Missouri, United States	
Win	13–3	Matt Delanoit	TKO (submission to strikes)	MCC 11: Night of Champions	November 21, 2007	3	1:43	Des Moines, Iowa, United States	
Loss	12–3	Leonardo Pecanha	Submission (armbar)	Titan FC 8	July 27, 2007	1	1:58	Kansas City, Kansas, United States	
Win	12–2	Danny Anderson	Decision (unanimous)	VFC 19: Inferno	May 18, 2007	3	5:00	Council Bluffs, Iowa, United States	
Win	11–2	Warren Walker	TKO (punches)	Titan FC 7	March 23, 2007	1	1:04	Kansas City, Kansas, United States	
Win	10–2	Victor Moreno	TKO (punches)	MCC 7: Valentine's Massacure	February 17, 2007	2	N/A	Des Moines, Iowa, United States	
Win	9–2	Ken Jackson	TKO (punches)	Titan FC 6	January 26, 2007	1	3:08	Kansas City, Kansas, United States	
Win	8–2	Ted Worthington	Decision (unanimous)	MCC 6: Hard Hitters	January 13, 2007	3	5:00	Urbandale, Iowa, United States	
Win	7–2	Jody Lithicum	TKO (submission to punches)	World Series of Rumble	November 17, 2006	1	0:43	Junction City, Kansas, United States	
Win	6–2	Clayton Marrs	Decision (unanimous)	Freestyle Cage Fighting	November 10, 2006	3	3:00	Tulsa, Oklahoma, United States	
Win	5–2	Jack Hodge	TKO (submission to punches)	Titan FC 5	August 4, 2006	2	0:51	Kansas City, Kansas, United States	
Loss	4–2	Justin Wilcox	Decision (unanimous)	Extreme Challenge 68	July 15, 2006	2	5:00	Hayward, Wisconsin, United States	
Win	4–1	Brian Green	TKO (punches)	Titan FC 4	June 9, 2006	2	1:38	Kansas City, Kansas, United States	
Win	3–1	Johnathan Richmond	TKO (punches)	Titan FC 2	May 12, 2006	1	1:58	Topeka, Kansas, United States	
Loss	2–1	Victor Moreno	TKO (punches)	MCC 2: Midwest Xplosion	April 8, 2006	1	0:08	Des Moines, Iowa, United States	
Win	2–0	Kyle Bradley	KO (punch)	Titan FC 1	March 11, 2006	1	4:47	Kansas City, Kansas, United States	
Win	1–0	Demi Deeds	TKO (punches)	Midwest Cage Championships 1	February 11, 2006	2	1:11	Des Moines, Iowa, United States	
