= David Douglas (fighter) =

American mixed martial arts fighter

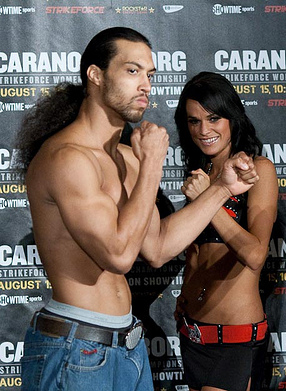
- David Douglas in 2009, at the weigh-in for the Strikeforce: Carano vs. Cyborg event.
- Born: August 16, 1982 (age 44); Antioch, California, United States
- Other names: Tarzan
- Height: 5 ft 11 in (1.80 m)
- Weight: 170 lb (77 kg; 12 st)
- Division: Middleweight; Welterweight; Lightweight; Featherweight
- Reach: 74 in (188 cm)
- Stance: Orthodox
- Fighting out of: Antioch, California, United States
- Team: Cesar Gracie Jiu Jitsu Academy
- Teacher: Cesar Gracie
- Years active: 2004-present

Mixed martial arts record
- Total: 22
- Wins: 10
- By knockout: 9
- By submission: 1
- Losses: 12
- By knockout: 9
- By submission: 3

Other information
- Mixed martial arts record from Sherdog

David Douglas is an American professional mixed martial artist and boxer. A professional MMA competitor since 2004, he has competed for Strikeforce, EliteXC and ShoXC.

== Background ==
Douglas was born and raised in the heart of a rough neighborhood in Antioch, California, along with his twin brother Damion, by their parents who worked for steel mills. The Douglas brothers got into many fights while growing up, beating up schoolyard bullies that were bigger and older than themselves. Both of them began learning the martial arts from a young age and were taught at home by their father, Danny, who was a black belt in Tae Kwon Do.

== Mixed martial arts career ==
=== Early career ===
After a 3-1 start to his professional career, Douglas was signed by EliteXC in 2008.

=== Strikeforce ===
Douglas made his debut for Strikeforce in August 2009 on the preliminary card of Strikeforce: Carano vs. Cyborg, losing to Justin Wilcox via submission.

He returned to the organization in 2010 on their ShoMMA Strikeforce Challengers series. He defeated Dominic Clark via TKO in October 2010 and Nick Gonzalez via submission in February 2011.

He next fought Caros Fodor at Strikeforce Challengers: Wilcox vs. Damm and lost in the third round by TKO.

== Professional boxing ==
Douglas made his professional boxing debut in 2016 against Jasper McCargo, losing via third round knockout.

Douglas returned to the ring in 2019 against 3-0 Chris Washington. He was defeated via first-round knockout.

== Personal life ==
Douglas got his nickname "Tarzan" from Cesar Gracie while training together, due to his long hair and lanky build. David's twin brother, Damion Douglas, is also a mixed martial artist who competed for Strikeforce. David has two children, while Damion has three.

== Mixed martial arts record ==
Professional record breakdown
22 matches	10 wins	12 losses
By knockout	9	9
By submission	1	3

Res.	Record	Opponent	Method	Event	Date	Round	Time	Location	Notes
Loss	10–12	Serob Minasyan	TKO (punches)	UNF 4	January 28, 2023	2	4:55	Commerce, California, United States	
Loss	10–11	Eugene Correa	Submission (heel hook)	Urijah Faber's A1 Combat 6	October 22, 2022	1	0:18	Commerce, California, United States	
Loss	10–10	Migran Arutyunyan	TKO (punches)	UNF 2	August 20, 2022	1	2:54	Commerce, California, United States	Return to Lightweight.
Loss	10–9	Richard LeRoy	TKO (punches)	Celtic Gladiator 21	May 19, 2018	1	3:45	Burbank, California, United States	Catchweight (165 lbs) bout.
Win	10–8	D.J. Roberson	TKO (punches)	Gladiator Challenge: Holiday Beatings	November 11, 2017	1	0:22	Lincoln, California, United States	Welterweight bout.
Loss	10–7	Eldon Sproat	TKO (punches)	X-1 World Events 48.5	September 30, 2017	2	3:04	Honolulu, Hawaii, United States	For the X-1 Middleweight Championship.
Loss	9–7	Chris Hofmann	TKO (punches)	URCC 29: Conquest	January 7, 2017	1	N/A	San Francisco, California, United States	For the URCC Middleweight Championship.
Win	9–6	DeMarco Villalona	TKO (punches)	Dragon House 22	February 6, 2016	1	1:00	San Francisco, California, United States	Middleweight debut.
Loss	8–6	Ray Cooper III	TKO (punches)	Star Elite Cage Fighting	August 7, 2015	1	0:27	Waipahu, Hawaii, United States	Welterweight bout.
Loss	8–5	Ousmane Thomas Diagne	KO (punch)	Red Canvas: Art of Submission 3	October 27, 2012	1	3:03	Stockton, California, United States	
Loss	8–4	Felipe Olivieri	TKO (knee and punches)	Wreck MMA: Road to Glory	April 20, 2012	1	2:54	Gatineau, Quebec, Canada	
Loss	8–3	Caros Fodor	TKO (strikes)	Strikeforce Challengers: Wilcox vs. Damm	April 1, 2011	3	2:12	Stockton, California, United States	
Win	8–2	Nick Gonzalez	Technical Submission (rear-naked choke)	Strikeforce Challengers: Beerbohm vs. Healy	February 18, 2011	1	1:05	Cedar Park, Texas, United States	Catchweight (150 lbs) bout.
Win	7–2	Dominic Clark	TKO (punches)	Strikeforce Challengers: Bowling vs. Voelker	October 22, 2010	2	2:33	Fresno, California, United States	
Loss	6–2	Justin Wilcox	Submission (rear-naked choke)	Strikeforce: Carano vs. Cyborg	August 15, 2009	3	3:16	San Jose, California, United States	
Win	6–1	Malaipet	TKO (punches)	ShoXC: Elite Challenger Series	September 26, 2008	3	2:51	Santa Ynez, California, United States	
Win	5–1	William Jacobson	TKO (corner stoppage)	ShoXC: Hamman vs. Suganuma II	August 15, 2008	1	1:12	Friant, California, United States	
Win	4–1	Marlon Mathias	TKO (punches)	EliteXC: Unfinished Business	July 26, 2008	1	0:12	Stockton, California, United States	Lightweight debut.
Win	3–1	Yusuke Ikenishi	TKO (doctor stoppage)	CCFC: Total Elimination	May 12, 2007	3	N/A	Santa Rosa, California, United States	
Loss	2–1	Jeff Curran	Submission (rear-naked choke)	IFC: Eve Of Destruction	March 5, 2005	1	1:39	Salt Lake City, Utah, United States	Featherweight debut.
Win	2–0	Joe Martin	TKO (corner stoppage)	IFC: Night of the Warriors 5	September 25, 2004	1	0:46	Susanville, California, United States	
Win	1–0	Richard Savala	TKO (punches)	IFC: Night of the Warriors 5	September 25, 2004	1	0:08	Susanville, California, United States	
