= Caros Fodor =

American mixed martial arts fighter

- Born: January 7, 1984 (age 42); Shoreline, Washington, U.S.
- Other names: The Future
- Height: 5 ft 9 in (1.75 m)
- Weight: 156 lb (71 kg; 11.1 st)
- Division: Lightweight
- Reach: 72 in (180 cm)
- Fighting out of: Kirkland, Washington, U.S.
- Team: AMC Pankration
- Years active: 2009–2017

Mixed martial arts record
- Total: 17
- Wins: 11
- By knockout: 2
- By submission: 5
- By decision: 4
- Losses: 6
- By submission: 2
- By decision: 4

Other information
- Notable relatives: Phoenix Jones (brother)
- Mixed martial arts record from Sherdog

Caros Fodor (born January 7, 1984) is an American former professional mixed martial artist who most recently competed in the Lightweight division of the Professional Fighters League. A professional competitor since 2009, he has also competed for the UFC, Strikeforce, the World Series of Fighting, ONE FC, and King of the Cage.

== Background ==
Fodor is from Shoreline, Washington. His biological father was from the Caribbean while his biological mother was Caucasian. Fodor along with his brother were placed in foster care, raised by a single mother, and did not actually know that they were related until they were 10 years old. In total, Fodor has three biological siblings as well as three adopted siblings, and one of his adopted brothers Ben Fodor aka Phoenix Jones is also a mixed martial artist. Fodor competed in high school wrestling at Shorecrest High School, during his senior year to help prepare himself for boot camp, as he enlisted in the United States Marine Corps six days after his graduation. While he was in boot camp, the terrorist attacks of 9/11 occurred and Fodor was sent to Kuwait for the Iraq invasion. Fodor ended his stint in the military in 2007, reaching the ranks of Sergeant.

== Mixed martial arts career ==
=== Early career ===
After an extensive, successful amateur career in which he was the Genesis Fights MMA and Muay Thai Champion and Revolution Submission Champion, Fodor turned professional in 2008 and won his first two fights, with both wins coming by guillotine choke submission. He then lost to Nate Hannah via armbar submission one second before the end of the second round.

=== Strikeforce ===
Fodor made his debut for Strikeforce in July 2010 on the main card of Strikeforce Challengers: del Rosario vs. Mahe, defeating Ousmane Thomas Diagne by unanimous decision.

He returned to the organization on their Strikeforce Challengers: Wilcox vs. Ribeiro card. He defeated Derek Getzel via submission due to a d'arce choke.

Fodor then faced off against David Douglas at Strikeforce Challengers: Wilcox vs. Damm on April 1. After dominating the first two rounds he stopped Douglas in the third by TKO due to multiple knee strikes.

Fodor's next fight was against James Terry in the main event at Strikeforce Challengers 16. He won the fight via unanimous decision.

Fodor returned on December 17, 2011, to face Justin Wilcox. He won the fight via knockout just thirteen seconds into the first round.

Fodor faced Pat Healy at Strikeforce: Tate vs. Rousey and lost via submission in the third round.

=== Ultimate Fighting Championship ===
Caros made the move to the UFC alongside numerous other Strikeforce fighters. He made his debut against Sam Stout on February 23, 2013, at UFC 157. Fodor lost to Stout by split decision. Fodor was released from the UFC after his loss to Stout.

=== ONE Fighting Championship ===
It was announced on August 2, 2013, that Fodor has signed with ONE FC.

Fodor made his debut at ONE FC: Champions & Warriors against undefeated Yang Seung Ho. He won the bout via unanimous decision.

In his second fight with the promotion, Fodor faced Vuyisile Colossa at ONE FC: Moment of Truth in December 2013. He lost the fight via unanimous decision.

For his third fight, Fodor faced Willy Ni at ONE FC: Honor & Glory. He won the fight via submission in the first round.

For his fourth fight, Fodor was due to face Vuyisile Colossa in a rematch at ONE FC: Rise of the Kingdom on 12 September at the Koh Pich Theatre in Phnom Penh, Cambodia. However, Colossa pulled out at the last minute due to injury. Fodor instead faced Dutch fighter Vincent "The Magnivincent" Latoel. He won the fight via submission in the second round.

== Personal life ==
Outside the cage, Fodor, who once had his sights set on becoming a homicide detective, is a trainer at a health club and works with children with disabilities.

Caros' brother Ben Fodor is Seattle's self-styled superhero Phoenix Jones.

== Mixed martial arts record ==
Professional record breakdown
| 17 matches | 11 wins | 6 losses |
| By knockout | 2 | 0 |
| By submission | 5 | 2 |
| By decision | 4 | 4 |

| Res. | Record | Opponent | Method | Event | Date | Round | Time | Location | Notes |
|---|---|---|---|---|---|---|---|---|---|
| Loss | 11–6 | Jason High | Decision (unanimous) | Professional Fighters League - PFL: Daytona | June 30, 2017 | 3 | 5:00 | Daytona Beach, Florida, United States | |
| Win | 11–5 | Phoenix Jones | Decision (unanimous) | WSOF 32 | July 30, 2016 | 3 | 5:00 | Everett, Washington, United States | |
| Loss | 10–5 | Luiz Firmino | Decision (unanimous) | WSOF 27 | January 23, 2016 | 3 | 5:00 | Memphis, Tennessee, United States | |
| Win | 10–4 | Vincent Latoel | Submission (rear-naked choke) | ONE FC: Rise of the Kingdom | September 12, 2014 | 2 | 4:43 | Phnom Penh, Cambodia | |
| Win | 9–4 | Willy Ni | Submission (kimura) | ONE FC: Honor and Glory | May 30, 2014 | 1 | 3:29 | Kallang, Singapore | |
| Loss | 8–4 | Vuyisile Colossa | Decision (unanimous) | ONE FC: Moment of Truth | December 6, 2013 | 3 | 5:00 | Pasay, Philippines | |
| Win | 8–3 | Yang Seung Ho | Decision (unanimous) | ONE FC: Champions & Warriors | September 13, 2013 | 3 | 5:00 | Jakarta, Indonesia | |
| Loss | 7–3 | Sam Stout | Decision (split) | UFC 157 | February 23, 2013 | 3 | 5:00 | Anaheim, California, United States | |
| Loss | 7–2 | Pat Healy | Submission (arm-triangle choke) | Strikeforce: Tate vs. Rousey | March 3, 2012 | 3 | 3:35 | Columbus, Ohio, United States | |
| Win | 7–1 | Justin Wilcox | KO (punches) | Strikeforce: Melendez vs. Masvidal | December 17, 2011 | 1 | 0:13 | San Diego, California, United States | |
| Win | 6–1 | James Terry | Decision (unanimous) | Strikeforce Challengers: Fodor vs. Terry | June 24, 2011 | 3 | 5:00 | Kent, Washington, United States | |
| Win | 5–1 | David Douglas | TKO (knees) | Strikeforce Challengers: Wilcox vs. Damm | April 1, 2011 | 3 | 2:12 | Stockton, California, United States | |
| Win | 4–1 | Derek Getzel | Submission (D'arce choke) | Strikeforce Challengers: Wilcox vs. Ribeiro | November 19, 2010 | 1 | 4:39 | Jackson, Mississippi, United States | |
| Win | 3–1 | Ousmane Thomas Diagne | Decision (unanimous) | Strikeforce Challengers: del Rosario vs. Mahe | July 23, 2010 | 3 | 5:00 | Everett, Washington, United States | |
| Loss | 2–1 | Nate Hannah | Submission (armbar) | Alaska Fighting Championship 68 | February 10, 2010 | 2 | 4:59 | Anchorage, Alaska, United States | |
| Win | 2–0 | Travis Smith | Submission (guillotine choke) | Arena Rumble: Horn vs. Guida | September 12, 2009 | 1 | 1:32 | Spokane, Washington, United States | |
| Win | 1–0 | Nick Meginness | Submission (guillotine choke) | KOTC: Thunderstruck | August 15, 2009 | 1 | 1:50 | Everett, Washington, United States | |
