= Roger Bowling =

Roger Bowling may refer to:

- Roger Bowling (songwriter) (1944–1982), American songwriter
- Roger Bowling (fighter) (born 1982), American mixed martial artist
