= 2011 in Strikeforce =

Mixed martial arts events

Information
- First date: January 30, 2011
- Last date: December 4, 2011

Events
- Total events: 16

Fights
- Total fights: 159
- Title fights: 10

Chronology
2010 in Strikeforce	2011 in Strikeforce	2012 in Strikeforce

The year 2011 was the 6th year in the history of Strikeforce, a mixed martial arts promotion based in the United States. In 2011 Strikeforce held 16 events beginning with, Strikeforce Challengers: Woodley vs. Saffiedine.

== Title fights ==
Title fights in 2011
Weight class				Method	Round	Time	Event	Notes
Welterweight	Nick Diaz (c)	def	Evangelista Santos	submission (armbar)	2	4:50	Strikeforce: Diaz vs. Cyborg	(Note: For the Welterweight Championship.)
Middleweight	Ronaldo Souza (c)	def.	Robbie Lawler	submission (rear naked choke)	3	2:00	Strikeforce: Diaz vs. Cyborg	(Note: For the Middleweight Championship.)
Light Heavyweight	Dan Henderson	def.	Rafael Cavalcante (c)	TKO (Punches)	3	0:50	Strikeforce: Feijao vs. Henderson	(Note: For the Light Heavyweight Championship.)
Women's Bantamweight	Marloes Coenen	def.	Liz Carmouche	Submission (Triangle Choke)	4	1:29	Strikeforce: Feijao vs. Henderson	(Note: For the Women's Bantamweight Championship.)
Welterweight	Nick Diaz (c)	def.	Paul Daley	TKO (Punches)	1	4:57	Strikeforce: Diaz vs. Daley	(Note: For the Welterweight Championship.)
Lightweight	Gilbert Melendez (c)	def.	Tatsuya Kawajiri	TKO (Elbows)	1	3:14	Strikeforce: Diaz vs. Daley	(Note: For the Lightweight Championship.)
Women's Bantamweight	Miesha Tate	def.	Marloes Coenen (c)	Submission (Arm-Triangle Choke)	4	3:03	Strikeforce: Fedor vs. Henderson	(Note: For the Women's Bantamweight Championship.)
Middleweight	Luke Rockhold	def.	Ronaldo Souza (c)	Decision (Unanimous)	5	5:00	Strikeforce: Barnett vs. Kharitonov	(Note: For the Middleweight Championship.)
Lightweight	Gilbert Melendez (c)	def.	Jorge Masvidal	unanimous decision (50–45, 50–45, 49–46)	5	5:00	Strikeforce: Melendez vs. Masvidal	(Note: For the Lightweight Championship.)
Women's Featherweight	Cristiane Justino (c)	def.	Hiroko Yamanaka	TKO (punches)	1	0:16	Strikeforce: Melendez vs. Masvidal	(Note: For the Women's Featherweight Championship. Santos subsequently tested positive for Stanozolol in a post-fight drug test and the CSAC ruled the bout a no contest.)

== Events list ==
#	Event Title	Date	Arena	Location	Attendance	Broadcast
57	Strikeforce: Melendez vs. Masvidal	December 17, 2011	Valley View Casino Center	San Diego, California	2,995	Showtime
56	Strikeforce Challengers: Britt vs. Sayers	November 18, 2011	Palms Casino Resort	Las Vegas, Nevada		Showtime
55	Strikeforce Challengers: Larkin vs. Rossborough	September 23, 2011	Palms Casino Resort	Las Vegas, Nevada		Showtime
54	Strikeforce: Barnett vs. Kharitonov	September 10, 2011	U.S. Bank Arena	Cincinnati, Ohio		Showtime & HDNet
53	Strikeforce Challengers: Gurgel vs. Duarte	August 12, 2011	Palms Casino Resort	Las Vegas, Nevada		Showtime
52	Strikeforce: Fedor vs. Henderson	July 30, 2011	Sears Centre	Hoffman Estates, Illinois	8,311	Showtime
51	Strikeforce Challengers: Voelker vs. Bowling III	July 22, 2011	Palms Casino Resort	Las Vegas, Nevada	1,876	Showtime
50	Strikeforce Challengers: Fodor vs. Terry	June 24, 2011	ShoWare Center	Kent, Washington	1,901	Showtime
49	Strikeforce: Overeem vs. Werdum	June 18, 2011	American Airlines Center	Dallas, Texas	7,639	Showtime & HDNet
48	Strikeforce: Diaz vs. Daley	April 9, 2011	Valley View Casino Center	San Diego, California	5,789	Showtime
47	Strikeforce Challengers: Wilcox vs. Damm	April 1, 2011	Stockton Arena	Stockton, California		Showtime
46	Strikeforce: Feijao vs. Henderson	March 5, 2011	Nationwide Arena	Columbus, Ohio	7,123	Showtime
45	Strikeforce Challengers: Beerbohm vs. Healy	February 18, 2011	Cedar Park Center	Cedar Park, Texas		Showtime
44	Strikeforce: Fedor vs. Silva	February 12, 2011	Izod Center	East Rutherford, New Jersey	11,287	Showtime & HDNet
43	Strikeforce: Diaz vs. Cyborg	January 29, 2011	HP Pavilion at San Jose	San Jose, California	9,059	Showtime
42	Strikeforce Challengers: Woodley vs. Saffiedine	January 7, 2011	Nashville Municipal Auditorium	Nashville, Tennessee	2,631	Showtime

== Strikeforce Challengers: Woodley vs. Saffiedine ==
Strikeforce Challengers: Woodley vs. Saffiedine
- Promotion: Strikeforce
- Date: January 7, 2011
- Venue: Nashville Municipal Auditorium
- City: Nashville, Tennessee
- Attendance: 2,631

Event chronology
Strikeforce: Henderson vs. Babalu II	Strikeforce Challengers: Woodley vs. Saffiedine	Strikeforce: Diaz vs. Cyborg

Strikeforce Challengers: Woodley vs. Saffiedine was an event held on January 7, 2011 at the Nashville Municipal Auditorium in Nashville, Tennessee.

=== Results ===
Main Card
Weight class				Method	Round	Time	Notes
	Tyron Woodley	def.	Tarec Saffiedine	Decision (unanimous)	3	5:00
	Ovince Saint Preux	def.	Ron Humphrey	Decision (unanimous)	3	5:00
	Daniel Cormier	def.	Devin Cole	Decision (unanimous)	3	5:00
	Amanda Nunes	def.	Julia Budd	KO (punches)	1	0:14
	Rhadi Ferguson	def.	John Richard	Submission (kneebar)	2	2:00
	Thomas Campbell	def.	Jeremy Wallace	Submission (rear-naked choke)	1	1:26
	John Salter	def.	Casey Huffman	TKO (punches)	1	2:59
	Dustin Ortiz	def.	Matt Horning	TKO (punches)	3	2:10
	Dustin West	def.	Daniel Schmitt	TKO (punches)	1	0:09
	Charles McTorry	def.	Krishaun Gilmore	Submission (rear-naked choke)	2	3:46
	Chris Barnhizer	def.	Karl Willis	Submission (armbar)	1	2:35
	Jason Blackford	def.	Jeremy Boczulak	Submission (heel hook)	1	1:54
	Luke Sanders	def.	Josh Jarvis	TKO (punches)	1	3:15
	Stoney Hale	def.	Gerric Hayes	Decision (split)	3	5:00
	Josh Phelps	def.	Randy Shores	Submission (smother choke)	1	1:07
	Cory Robison	def.	Dusty Gibbs	Submission (guillotine choke)	1	1:37
	Steven Durr	def.	Dave Hurst	Submission (triangle choke)	1	1:36

== Strikeforce: Diaz vs. Cyborg ==
Strikeforce: Diaz vs. Cyborg was an event held on January 29, 2011 at the HP Pavilion at San Jose in San Jose, California.

=== Results ===
Main card
Weight class				Method	Round	Time	Notes
Welterweight	Nick Diaz (c)	def	Evangelista Santos	submission (armbar)	2	4:50	(Note: For the Welterweight Championship.)
Middleweight	Ronaldo Souza (c)	def	Robbie Lawler	submission (rear naked choke)	3	2:00	(Note: For the Middleweight Championship.)
Heavyweight	Herschel Walker	def	Scott Carson	TKO (strikes)	1	3:13
Light Heavyweight	Roger Gracie	def	Trevor Prangley	submission (rear-naked choke)	1	4:19
Sherdog.com live stream
Welterweight	James Terry	def	Lucas Gamaza	TKO (strikes)	1	3:26
Women's Bantamweight	Germaine de Randamie	def	Stephanie Webber	KO (knee)	1	4:25
Welterweight	Nate Moore	def	Nathan Coy	KO (punches)	2	0:25
Preliminary card
Women's Flyweight	Jenna Castillo	def	Charlene Gellner	TKO (strikes)	2	3:57
Lightweight	Isaiah Hill	def	Bobby Stack	submission (triangle choke)	1	1:02
Catchweight (180 lb)	Ron Keslar	def	Eric Lawson	submission (armbar)	1	1:57
Welterweight	Armin Safiari	def	Sam Bracamonte	unanimous decision	3	5:00
Catchweight (165 lb)	Ricky Jackson	def	Nikko Jackson	unanimous decision	3	5:00
Catchweight (150 lb)	Anthony Dariano	def	Alan Perez	unanimous decision	3	5:00

== Strikeforce: Fedor vs. Silva ==
Strikeforce: Fedor vs. Silva was an event held on February 12, 2011 at the Izod Center in East Rutherford, New Jersey.

=== Results ===
Showtime Sports
Weight class				Method	Round	Time	Notes
Heavyweight	Antônio Silva	def	Fedor Emelianenko	TKO (doctor stoppage)	2	5:00
Heavyweight	Sergei Kharitonov	def	Andrei Arlovski	KO (punches)	1	2:49
Heavyweight	Shane del Rosario	def	Lavar Johnson	submission (armbar)	1	4:31
Heavyweight	Chad Griggs	def	Gian Villante	TKO (punches)	1	2:49
Heavyweight	Valentijn Overeem	def	Ray Sefo	submission (neck crank)	1	1:37
HDNet
Catchweight (156 lb)	John Cholish	def	Marc Stevens	submission (kneebar)	2	3:57
Welterweight	Igor Gracie	def	John Salgado	technical submission (arm-triangle choke)	2	3:04
Welterweight	Sam Oropeza	def	Don Carlo-Clauss	TKO (Submission to strikes)	1	4:10
Featherweight	Josh LaBerge	def	Anthony Leone	TKO (doctor stoppage)	1	5:00
Featherweight	Jason McLean	def	Kevin Roddy	split decision (29–28, 28–29, 29–28)	3	5:00

== Strikeforce Challengers: Beerbohm vs. Healy ==
Strikeforce Challengers: Beerbohm vs. Healy
- Promotion: Strikeforce
- Date: February 18, 2011
- Venue: Cedar Park Center
- City: Cedar Park, Texas

Event chronology
Strikeforce: Fedor vs. Silva	Strikeforce Challengers: Beerbohm vs. Healy	Strikeforce: Feijao vs. Henderson

Strikeforce Challengers: Beerbohm vs. Healy was an event held on February 18, 2011 at the Cedar Park Center in Cedar Park, Texas.

=== Results ===
Main Card
Weight class				Method	Round	Time	Notes
	Pat Healy	def.	Lyle Beerbohm	Decision (Unanimous)	3	5:00
	Carlo Prater	def.	Bryan Travers	Technical Submission (Anaconda Choke)	1	0:38
	Ryan Couture	def.	Lee Higgins	Submission (Rear-Naked Choke)	3	4:41
	Ryan Larson	def.	Erik Apple	Submission (Triangle Choke)	2	3:14
	David Douglas	def.	Nick Gonzalez	Technical Submission (Rear-Naked Choke)	1	1:05
	Aaron Lanfranco	def.	Ousmane Thomas Diagne	KO (Punches)	1	4:22
	Drew Pendleton	def.	Dennis Dombrow	Submission (Guillotine Choke)	2	2:38

== Strikeforce: Feijao vs. Henderson ==
Strikeforce: Feijao vs. Henderson was an event held on March 5, 2011 at the Nationwide Arena in Columbus, Ohio.

=== Results ===
Main Card
Weight class				Method	Round	Time	Notes
Light Heavyweight	Dan Henderson	def.	Rafael Cavalcante (c)	TKO (Punches)	3	0:50	(Note: For the Light Heavyweight Championship.)
Women's Bantamweight	Marloes Coenen	def.	Liz Carmouche	Submission (Triangle Choke)	4	1:29	(Note: For the Women's Bantamweight Championship.)
Middleweight	Tim Kennedy	def.	Melvin Manhoef	Submission (Rear-Naked Choke)	1	3:41
Lightweight	Jorge Masvidal	def.	Billy Evangelista	Decision (Unanimous)	3	5:00
Preliminary card
Welterweight	Roger Bowling	def.	Josh Thornburg	Decision (Unanimous)	3	5:00
Lightweight	Jorge Gurgel	def.	Billy Vaughan	Submission (Guillotine Choke)	1	0:44
Heavyweight	Jay Freeman	def.	Jason Riley	TKO (Submission to punches)	1	1:52
Middleweight	Brian Rogers	def.	Ian Rammel	TKO (Punches)	1	4:23
Middleweight	Mitch Whitesel	def.	Marc Cofer	Submission (Guillotine Choke)	1	3:55
Welterweight	John Kuhner	def.	John Felty	Technical Submission (Triangle Choke)	2	4:31

== Strikeforce Challengers: Wilcox vs. Damm ==
Strikeforce Challengers: Wilcox vs. Damm
- Promotion: Strikeforce
- Date: April 1, 2011
- Venue: Stockton Arena
- City: Stockton, California

Event chronology
Strikeforce: Feijao vs. Henderson	Strikeforce Challengers: Wilcox vs. Damm	Strikeforce: Diaz vs. Daley

Strikeforce Challengers: Wilcox vs. Damm was an event held on April 1, 2011 at the Stockton Arena in Stockton, California.

=== Results ===
Main Card
Weight class				Method	Round	Time	Notes
	Justin Wilcox	def.	Rodrigo Damm	TKO (Doctor Stoppage)	1	5:00
	Caros Fodor	def.	David Douglas	TKO (Knees)	3	2:12
	Lorenz Larkin	def.	Scott Lighty	TKO (Punches)	2	3:15
	James Terry	def.	Josh Thornburg	KO (Punch)	1	4:38
	Damion Douglas	def.	Wayne Phillips	Decision (Split)	3	5:00
	Anthony Avila	def.	Rafael Rios	Decision (Unanimous)	3	5:00
	Robert Escalante	def.	Raul Sandoval	Submission (Armbar)	1	4:10
	Tristan Arenal	def.	Tom Peterson	Submission (Armbar)	1	1:58
	Ronald Carillo	def.	Adam Antolin	Submission (Rear-Naked Choke)	1	1:48

== Strikeforce: Diaz vs. Daley ==
Strikeforce: Diaz vs. Daley was an event held on April 9, 2011 at the Valley View Casino Center in San Diego, California.

=== Results ===
Main Card
Weight class				Method	Round	Time	Notes
Welterweight	Nick Diaz (c)	def.	Paul Daley	TKO (Punches)	1	4:57	(Note: For the Welterweight Championship.)
Lightweight	Gilbert Melendez (c)	def.	Tatsuya Kawajiri	TKO (Elbows)	1	3:14	(Note: For the Lightweight Championship.)
	Gegard Mousasi	vs.	Keith Jardine	Draw (Majority)	3	5:00
	Shinya Aoki	def.	Lyle Beerbohm	Submission (Neck Crank)	1	1:33
	Robbie Peralta	def.	Hiroyuki Takaya	Decision (Split)	3	5:00
	Virgil Zwicker	def.	Brett Albee	TKO (Punches)	1	1:46
	Joe Duarte	def.	Saad Awad	Submission (Armbar)	2	2:45
	Herman Terrado	def.	A.J. Matthews	KO (Punch)	1	4:16
	Rolando Perez	def.	Edgar Cardenas	Decision (Unanimous)	3	5:00
	Casey Ryan	def.	Paul Song	Submission (Triangle Choke)	1	1:39

== Strikeforce: Overeem vs. Werdum ==
Strikeforce: Overeem vs. Werdum was an event held on June 18, 2011 at the American Airlines Center in Dallas, Texas.

=== Results ===
Main Card
Weight class				Method	Round	Time	Notes
	Todd Moore	def.	Mike Bronzoulis	Decision (Unanimous)	3	5:00
	Alistair Overeem	def.	Fabrício Werdum	Decision (Unanimous)	3	5:00
	Josh Barnett	def.	Brett Rogers	Submission (Arm-Triangle Choke)	2	1:17
	Jorge Masvidal	def.	K. J. Noons	Decision (Unanimous)	3	5:00
	Daniel Cormier	def.	Jeff Monson	Decision (Unanimous)	3	5:00
	Chad Griggs	def.	Valentijn Overeem	TKO (Submission to punches)	1	2:08
	Justin Wilcox	vs.	Gesias Cavalcante	NC (Wilcox Poked in the Eye)	2	0:31
	Conor Heun	def.	Magno Almeida	Decision (Unanimous)	3	5:00
	Nah-Shon Burrell	def.	Joe Ray	Decision (Unanimous)	3	5:00
	Isaac Vallie-Flagg	def.	Brian Melancon	Decision (Split)	3	5:00

== Strikeforce Challengers: Fodor vs. Terry ==
Strikeforce Challengers: Fodor vs. Terry
- Promotion: Strikeforce
- Date: June 24, 2011
- Venue: ShoWare Center
- City: Kent, Washington
- Attendance: 1,901

Event chronology
Strikeforce: Overeem vs. Werdum	Strikeforce Challengers: Fodor vs. Terry	Strikeforce Challengers: Voelker vs. Bowling III

Strikeforce Challengers: Fodor vs. Terry was an event held on June 24, 2011 at the ShoWare Center in Kent, Washington.

=== Results ===
Main Card
Weight class				Method	Round	Time	Notes
	Caros Fodor	def.	James Terry	Decision (Unanimous)	3	5:00
	Matt Ricehouse	def.	Ryan Couture	Decision (Unanimous)	3	5:00
	Lorenz Larkin	def.	Gian Villante	Decision (Unanimous)	3	5:00
	Jason High	def.	Quinn Mulhern	Decision (Unanimous)	3	5:00
	Julia Budd	def.	Germaine de Randamie	Decision (Unanimous)	3	5:00
	Derek Brunson	def.	Jeremy Hamilton	Decision (Unanimous)	3	5:00
	Eduardo Pamplona	def.	Jerron Peoples	TKO (Punches)	1	2:40
	Trevor Smith	def.	Keith Berry	Technical Submission (North-South Choke)	2	3:02

== Strikeforce Challengers: Voelker vs. Bowling III ==
Strikeforce Challengers: Voelker vs. Bowling III
- Promotion: Strikeforce
- Date: July 22, 2011
- Venue: Palms Casino Resort
- City: Las Vegas, Nevada
- Attendance: 2,322

Event chronology
Strikeforce Challengers: Fodor vs. Terry	Strikeforce Challengers: Voelker vs. Bowling III	Strikeforce: Fedor vs. Henderson

Strikeforce Challengers: Voelker vs. Bowling III was an event held on July 22, 2011 at the Palms Casino Resort in Las Vegas, Nevada.

=== Results ===
Main Card
Weight class				Method	Round	Time	Notes
	Bobby Voelker	def.	Roger Bowling	TKO (Knee and Punches)	2	2:16
	Devin Cole	def.	Shawn Jordan	Decision (Unanimous)	3	5:00
	Ovince Saint Preux	def.	Joe Cason	TKO (Submission to punches)	1	1:12
	Sarah Kaufman	def.	Liz Carmouche	Decision (Unanimous)	3	5:00
	Adlan Amagov	def.	Ron Stallings	Decision (Split)	3	5:00
	T. J. Cook	def.	Lionel Lanham	TKO (Punches)	1	4:59
	Anthony Smith	def.	Ben Lagman	KO (Punch)	2	0:33
	Bill Cooper	def.	Maka Watson	Submission (Rear-Naked Choke)	2	2:39
	Sterling Ford	def.	Brian McLaughlin	Decision (Unanimous)	3	5:00

== Strikeforce: Fedor vs. Henderson ==
Strikeforce: Fedor vs. Henderson was an event held on July 30, 2011 at the Sears Centre in Hoffman Estates, Illinois.

=== Results ===
Main Card
Weight class				Method	Round	Time	Notes
	Dan Henderson	def.	Fedor Emelianenko	TKO (Punches)	1	4:12
Women's Bantamweight	Miesha Tate	def.	Marloes Coenen (c)	Submission (Arm-Triangle Choke)	4	3:03	(Note: For the Women's Bantamweight Championship.)
	Tim Kennedy	def.	Robbie Lawler	Decision (Unanimous)	3	5:00
	Tyron Woodley	def.	Paul Daley	Decision (Unanimous)	3	5:00
	Tarec Saffiedine	def.	Scott Smith	Decision (Unanimous)	3	5:00
	Gesias Cavalcante	def.	Bobby Green	Decision (Split)	3	5:00
	Tyler Stinson	def.	Eduardo Pamplona	KO (Punch)	1	0:15
	Alexis Davis	def.	Julie Kedzie	Decision (Unanimous)	3	5:00
	Derek Brunson	def.	Lumumba Sayers	Submission (Rear-Naked Choke)	1	4:33
	Gabriel Salinas-Jones	def.	Bryan Humes	Submission (Brabo Choke)	3	1:19

== Strikeforce Challengers: Gurgel vs. Duarte ==
Strikeforce Challengers: Gurgel vs. Duarte
- Promotion: Strikeforce
- Date: August 12, 2011
- Venue: Palms Casino Resort
- City: Las Vegas, Nevada

Event chronology
Strikeforce: Fedor vs. Henderson	Strikeforce Challengers: Gurgel vs. Duarte	Strikeforce: Barnett vs. Kharitonov

Strikeforce Challengers: Gurgel vs. Duarte was an event held on August 12, 2011 at the Palms Casino Resort in Las Vegas, Nevada.

=== Results ===
Main Card
Weight class				Method	Round	Time	Notes
	Joe Duarte	def.	Jorge Gurgel	Decision (Unanimous)	3	5:00
	Nate James	def.	Danillo Villefort	Decision (Unanimous)	3	5:00
	Pat Healy	def.	Eric Wisely	Decision (Unanimous)	3	5:00
	Ronda Rousey	def.	Sarah D'Alelio	Technical Submission (Armbar)	1	0:25
	Derrick Mehmen	def.	Roy Jones	Decision (Unanimous)	3	5:00
	Gian Villante	def.	Keith Berry	Decision (Unanimous)	3	5:00
	Nah-Shon Burrell	def.	Lukasz Les	TKO (Leg Kick and Punches)	2	2:09
	Mike Bronzoulis	def.	Chad Leonhardt	TKO (Leg Kick and Punches)	3	1:30
	Milton Vieira	def.	Sterling Ford	Technical Submission (Brabo Choke)	1	4:49

== Strikeforce: Barnett vs. Kharitonov ==
Strikeforce: Barnett vs. Kharitonov was an event held on September 10, 2011 at the U.S. Bank Arena in Cincinnati, Ohio.

=== Results ===
Main Card
Weight class				Method	Round	Time	Notes
	Josh Barnett	def.	Sergei Kharitonov	Submission (Arm-Triangle Choke)	1	4:28
	Daniel Cormier	def.	Antônio Silva	KO (Punches)	1	3:56
Middleweight	Luke Rockhold	def.	Ronaldo Souza (c)	Decision (Unanimous)	5	5:00	(Note: For the Middleweight Championship.)
	Muhammed Lawal	def.	Roger Gracie	KO (Punches)	1	4:33
	Pat Healy	def.	Maximo Blanco	Submission (Rear-Naked Choke)	2	4:27
	Mike Kyle	def.	Marcos Rogerio de Lima	Decision (Unanimous)	3	5:00
	Rafael Cavalcante	def.	Yoel Romero	KO (Punches)	2	4:51
	Jordan Mein	def.	Evangelista Santos	TKO (Elbows)	3	3:18
	Alexis Davis	def.	Amanda Nunes	TKO (Punches)	2	4:53
	Dominique Steele	def.	Chris Mierzwiak	Decision (Unanimous)	3	5:00

== Strikeforce Challengers: Larkin vs. Rossborough ==
Strikeforce Challengers: Larkin vs. Rossborough
- Promotion: Strikeforce
- Date: September 23, 2011
- Venue: Palms Casino Resort
- City: Las Vegas, Nevada

Event chronology
Strikeforce: Barnett vs. Kharitonov	Strikeforce Challengers: Larkin vs. Rossborough	Strikeforce Challengers: Britt vs. Sayers

Strikeforce Challengers: Larkin vs. Rossborough was an event held on September 23, 2011 at the Palms Casino Resort in Las Vegas, Nevada.

=== Results ===
Main Card
Weight class				Method	Round	Time	Notes
	Lorenz Larkin	def.	Nick Rossborough	Decision (Unanimous)	3	5:00
	Shawn Jordan	def.	Lavar Johnson	Submission (Keylock)	2	3:08
	Ryan Couture	def.	Maka Watson	Decision (Majority)	3	5:00
	Jason High	def.	Todd Moore	Decision (Unanimous)	3	5:00
	Brian Melancon	def.	Felipe Portela	Decision (Unanimous)	3	5:00
	James Terry	def.	Magno Almeida	KO	1	3:21
	Bobby Green	def.	Charon Spain	Submission (Arm-Triangle Choke)	2	2:54
	Chris Spång	def.	Joe Ray	Decision (Unanimous)	3	5:00
	Quinn Mulhern	def.	Danny Davis Jr.	Submission (Arm-Triangle Choke)	3	4:08

== Strikeforce Challengers: Britt vs. Sayers ==
Strikeforce Challengers: Britt vs. Sayers
- Promotion: Strikeforce
- Date: November 18, 2011
- Venue: Palms Casino Resort
- City: Las Vegas, Nevada

Event chronology
Strikeforce Challengers: Larkin vs. Rossborough	Strikeforce Challengers: Britt vs. Sayers	Strikeforce: Melendez vs. Masvidal

Strikeforce Challengers: Britt vs. Sayers was an event held on November 18, 2011 at the Palms Casino Resort in Las Vegas, Nevada.

=== Results ===
Main Card
Weight class				Method	Round	Time	Notes
	Lumumba Sayers	def.	Antwain Britt	KO (Punches)	1	0:28
	Ronda Rousey	def.	Julia Budd	Submission (Armbar)	1	0:39
	Adlan Amagov	def.	Anthony Smith	KO (Punches)	1	2:32
	Trevor Smith	def.	T. J. Cook	Submission (Guillotine Choke)	1	4:28
	Derek Brunson	def.	Nate James	Decision (Unanimous)	3	5:00
	Matt Ricehouse	def.	Bill Cooper	Decision (Unanimous)	3	5:00
	Bobby Green	def.	J. P. Reese	Submission (Rear-Naked Choke)	3	2:25
	Quinn Mulhern	def.	David Hulett	Decision (Unanimous)	3	5:00
	Andreas Spång	def.	Willie Parks	TKO (Punches)	1	3:10

== Strikeforce: Melendez vs. Masvidal ==
Strikeforce: Melendez vs. Masvidal was an event held on December 17, 2011 at the Valley View Casino Center in San Diego, California.

=== Results ===
Showtime
Weight class				Method	Round	Time	Notes
Lightweight	Gilbert Melendez (c)	def	Jorge Masvidal	unanimous decision (50–45, 50–45, 49–46)	5	5:00	(Note: For the Lightweight Championship.)
Women's Featherweight	Cristiane Justino (c)	def	Hiroko Yamanaka	TKO (punches)	1	0:16	(Note: For the Women's Featherweight Championship. Santos subsequently tested positive for Stanozolol in a post-fight drug test and the CSAC ruled the bout a no contest.)
Light Heavyweight	Gegard Mousasi	def	Ovince Saint Preux	unanimous decision (29–28, 29–28, 29–28)	3	5:00
Lightweight	K. J. Noons	def	Billy Evangelista	unanimous decision (29–28, 29–28, 29–28)	3	5:00
Preliminary card
Catchweight (181 lb)	Roger Bowling	def	Jerron Peoples	KO (punches)	1	0:42
Lightweight	Caros Fodor	def	Justin Wilcox	KO (punches)	1	0:13
Heavyweight	Devin Cole	def	Gabriel Salinas-Jones	unanimous decision (30–27, 30–27, 30–27)	3	5:00
Welterweight	Herman Terrado	def	Chris Brown	submission (armbar)	3	4:05
Middleweight	Eddie Mendez	def	Fernando Gonzalez	split decision (30–27, 28–29, 29–28)	3	5:00

== See also ==
- List of Strikeforce champions
- List of Strikeforce events
