= Justin Wilcox (martial arts) =

American mixed martial arts fighter

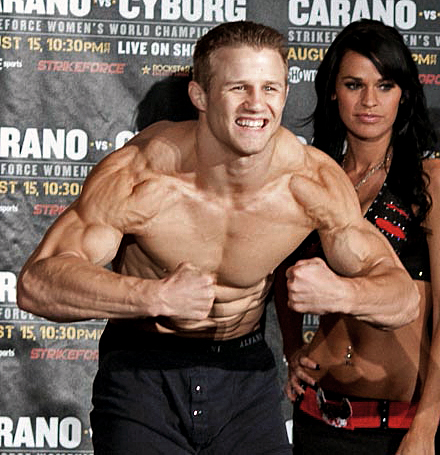
- Wilcox in 2009
- Born: March 12, 1979 (age 47)
- Other names: The Silverback
- Nationality: American
- Height: 5 ft 6 in (1.68 m)
- Weight: 145 lb (66 kg; 10.4 st)
- Division: Lightweight; Featherweight
- Reach: 65 in (165 cm)
- Fighting out of: San Jose, California, United States
- Team: American Kickboxing Academy
- Years active: 2006-present

Mixed martial arts record
- Total: 22
- Wins: 14
- By knockout: 2
- By submission: 2
- By decision: 10
- Losses: 7
- By knockout: 4
- By submission: 2
- By decision: 1
- No contests: 1

Other information
- Mixed martial arts record from Sherdog

Justin Wilcox (born March 12, 1979) is an American mixed martial artist currently competing in the Lightweight division of Bellator. A professional competitor since 2006, Wilcox has also competed for Strikeforce, holding a record of 5-3 (1) in the promotion.

== Background ==
Wilcox began wrestling when he was five years old and was talented, continuing in the sport through high school and in college at the Edinboro University of Pennsylvania alongside current UFC Welterweight Josh Koscheck, who was an NCAA Champion. Wilcox himself continued excelling at the collegiate level, becoming an NCAA qualifier as a true freshman and continued competing well after redshirting in his sophomore season, winning several tournaments. However, after being hit with an inadvertent headbutt which may have caused a concussion, Wilcox was preparing for another match when he slipped and knocked himself out when he hit the floor. The concussion, along with multiple bone fractures, were severe enough to end his career. Wilcox had been inspired to compete in mixed martial arts after seeing Koscheck on the first season of "The Ultimate Fighter" and began training in the sport himself. At the time, Wilcox was a professional bodybuilder, winning various contests while also running a gym in Pennsylvania, and weighed 205 lbs.

== Mixed martial arts career ==
=== Early career ===
After a shaky 2–2 start to his career, Wilcox moved to train with Koscheck at American Kickboxing Academy as well as dropping down a weight class to compete at Lightweight.

=== Strikeforce ===
In his Strikeforce debut, Wilcox fought against Mitsuhiro Ishida and lost by submission (armbar) at 1:21 of the first round.

After that loss Wilcox won three straight fights over David Douglas, PRIDE veteran Daisuke Nakamura and The Ultimate Fighter 13 alumni Shamar Bailey.

On November 19, 2010, Wilcox faced DREAM veteran Vítor Ribeiro in the main event of Strikeforce Challengers: Wilcox vs. Ribeiro. He won the fight via unanimous decision (30-27, 30–27, 30–27).

Wilcox upped his win streak to five with a TKO victory over veteran Rodrigo Damm at Strikeforce Challengers: Wilcox vs. Damm. The fight was stopped by a ringside doctor at the end of the first round due to lacerations above both of Damm's eyes.

Wilcox fought Gesias Cavalcante at Strikeforce: Overeem vs. Werdum. The bout was declared a no-contest after Wilcox was poked in the eye in the second round and could not continue.

In his next fight, Wilcox competed at Strikeforce: Melendez vs. Masvidal against rising prospect Caros Fodor. He lost the fight via knockout in the first round.

Wilcox fought former lightweight title challenger Jorge Masvidal at Strikeforce: Rockhold vs. Kennedy. He lost the fight via split decision.

=== Bellator MMA ===
After over a year a way from the sport, Wilcox was signed by Bellator as a last minute replacement for their Season Nine Featherweight tournament. This would mark the first time Wilcox had ever competed as a Featherweight. Wilcox replaced Shahbulat Shamhalaev on just a few days notice and fought against Akop Stepanyan at Bellator 99. Despite losing the first round decisively due to a series of low kicks that visibly injured his leg and hindered his ability to stand and walk, Wilcox mounted a comeback in the second round and won via rear-naked choke submission moving him into the next round of the tournament.

Wilcox faced up and comer Joe Taimanglo in the semifinals at Bellator 103. Wilcox controlled the entire matchup and won via unanimous decision (29-28, 30–27, 30–27).

In the finals of the Featherweight Tournament taking place at Bellator 108, Wilcox fought Top 15 Featherweight, Patricio Freire. Wilcox lost the fight via first-round technical knockout. After the loss Wilcox decided to return to his natural weight class of Lightweight (155 lbs.).

Wilcox returned to Lightweight and faced Jason Fischer on March 28, 2014, at Bellator 114. He won via unanimous decision.

Wilcox faced Daniel Mason-Straus in the main event at Bellator 127 on October 3, 2014. He lost the fight via knockout in the first round.

== Personal life ==
Wilcox and his wife Leslie have a daughter named Natalie.

== Championships and accomplishments ==
- Bellator MMA
  - Bellator Season Nine Featherweight Tournament Runner-Up

== Mixed martial arts record ==
Professional record breakdown
22 matches	14 wins	7 losses
By knockout	2	4
By submission	2	2
By decision	10	1
No contests	1	

Res.	Record	Opponent	Method	Event	Date	Round	Time	Location	Notes
Loss	14–7 (1)	Daniel Mason-Straus	KO (punches)	Bellator 127	October 3, 2014	1	0:50	Temecula, California, United States	
Win	14–6 (1)	Jason Fischer	Decision (unanimous)	Bellator 114	March 28, 2014	3	5:00	West Valley City, Utah, United States	Returns to Lightweight.
Loss	13–6–1	Patrício Freire	TKO (punches)	Bellator 108	November 15, 2013	1	2:23	Atlantic City, New Jersey, United States	Bellator Season Nine Featherweight Tournament Final.
Win	13–5–1	Joe Taimanglo	Decision (unanimous)	Bellator 103	October 11, 2013	3	5:00	Mulvane, Kansas, United States	Bellator Season Nine Featherweight Tournament Semifinal.
Win	12–5–1	Akop Stepanyan	Technical Submission (rear naked choke)	Bellator 99	September 13, 2013	2	2:20	Temecula, California, United States	Bellator Season Nine Featherweight Tournament Quarterfinal.
Loss	11–5–1	Jorge Masvidal	Decision (split)	Strikeforce: Rockhold vs. Kennedy	July 14, 2012	3	5:00	Portland, Oregon, United States	
Loss	11–4–1	Caros Fodor	KO (punches)	Strikeforce: Melendez vs. Masvidal	December 17, 2011	1	0:13	San Diego, California, United States	
NC	11–3–1	Gesias Cavalcante	NC (accidental eye poke)	Strikeforce: Overeem vs. Werdum	June 18, 2011	2	0:31	Dallas, Texas, United States	Cavalcante poked Wilcox in the eye.
Win	11–3	Rodrigo Damm	TKO (doctor stoppage)	Strikeforce Challengers: Wilcox vs. Damm	April 1, 2011	1	5:00	Stockton, California, United States	
Win	10–3	Vítor Ribeiro	Decision (unanimous)	Strikeforce Challengers: Wilcox vs. Ribeiro	November 19, 2010	3	5:00	Jackson, Mississippi, United States	
Win	9–3	Shamar Bailey	Decision (unanimous)	Strikeforce Challengers: Johnson vs. Mahe	March 26, 2010	3	5:00	Fresno, California, United States	
Win	8–3	Daisuke Nakamura	Decision (unanimous)	Strikeforce: Evolution	December 19, 2009	3	5:00	San Jose, California, United States	
Win	7–3	David Douglas	Submission (rear naked choke)	Strikeforce: Carano vs. Cyborg	August 15, 2009	3	3:16	San Jose, California, United States	
Win	6–3	Moses Baca	Decision (unanimous)	Disturbing the Peace	June 27, 2009	3	5:00	Fresno, California, United States	
Loss	5–3	Mitsuhiro Ishida	Submission (armbar)	Strikeforce: At The Mansion II	September 20, 2008	1	1:21	Los Angeles, California, United States	
Win	5–2	Gabe Ruediger	Decision (unanimous)	JG and TKT Promotions: Fighting 4 Kidz	August 30, 2008	3	5:00	Santa Monica, California, United States	
Win	4–2	Todd Murphey	TKO (punches)	Extreme Challenge 82	August 18, 2007	3	2:35	Springfield, Illinois, United States	
Win	3–2	Allan Lee	Decision (unanimous)	Extreme Challenge 77	April 28, 2007	3	5:00	Mason, Ohio, United States	Drops to Lightweight.
Win	2–2	Bryce Teager	Decision (unanimous)	Extreme Challenge 76	March 31, 2007	3	5:00	Sloan, Iowa, United States	
Loss	1–2	Dan Hornbuckle	TKO (punches)	Total Fight Challenge 6	September 9, 2006	1	1:20	Hammond, Indiana, United States	
Loss	1–1	Chad Reiner	Submission (armbar)	Extreme Challenge 68	July 15, 2006	1	2:54	Hayward, Wisconsin, United States	
Win	1–0	Bobby Voelker	Decision (unanimous)	Extreme Challenge 68	July 15, 2006	2	5:00	Hayward, Wisconsin, United States	
