= Roger Bowling (fighter) =

American mixed martial arts fighter

- Born: May 8, 1982 (age 44); Neville, Ohio
- Other names: Relentless
- Nationality: American
- Height: 5 ft 8 in (1.73 m)
- Weight: 170 lb (77 kg; 12 st)
- Division: Lightweight; Welterweight
- Reach: 70 in (180 cm)
- Fighting out of: Cincinnati, Ohio, United States
- Team: Team Vision
- Years active: 2007–present

Mixed martial arts record
- Total: 19
- Wins: 12
- By knockout: 8
- By submission: 2
- By decision: 2
- Losses: 6
- By knockout: 4
- By submission: 1
- By decision: 1
- No contests: 1

Amateur boxing record
- Total: 9
- Wins: 9

Other information
- Mixed martial arts record from Sherdog

Roger Bowling (born May 8, 1982) is an American professional mixed martial artist currently competing in the Welterweight division. A professional competitor since 2007, Bowling competed for the UFC and Strikeforce.

== Background ==
Bowling was born and raised in the small village of Neville, Ohio, and is the oldest of three siblings. Bowling's early life was difficult as his father was a drug addict who was often in and out of jail while Bowling's mother had to work two jobs, which including driving a school bus, to support the family. Bowling was athletic playing sports such as football and baseball, but his athletic activities were limited by a lack of transportation. He attended Felicity Franklin Highschool. When he was 18 years old he went to live with his girlfriend and go to Grant vocational school to learn welding. Bowling has a background in amateur boxing with an undefeated 9-0 record, having competed and dominated his opponents in Toughman-like competitions. Bowling later joined a gym where he was introduced him to mixed martial arts.

== Mixed martial arts career ==
=== Early career ===
After joining the MMA gym, Bowling had his first fight against an opponent who, at 6'6”, towered over the 5'8” Bowling. Despite the huge size disadvantage, Bowling won the bout and broke his opponent's nose. Bowling competed as a Middleweight for all of his amateur fights, and held an amateur record of 3-1.

From 2007 to 2009, Bowling built his career fighting for the MMA Big Show, a regional promotion known for pitting up and comers against UFC veterans to springboard talent. He earned the Welterweight Championship and carried the belt until MMA Big Show promoter and manager Jason Appleton signed Bowling to a three-year deal with Strikeforce.

On June 20, 2009 Bowling was set to fight the controversial former UFC Welterweight War Machine, formerly known as Jon Koppenhaver. However Bowling broke his hand a couple of weeks before the event and was not cleared to fight. The two agreed to fight later in the year. Before the rescheduled match up, Roger defeated Devon Plaisance via TKO in July 2009. Bowling was again set to fight War Machine in the main event of XFC 9 in Tampa, Florida on September 5, however, Bowling was again forced to withdraw due to injury.

=== Strikeforce ===
In October 2009, Bowling signed with Strikeforce. He was set to make his debut in November 2009, but was forced to withdraw because of an injury.

Bowling subsequently made his debut in May 2010 on the Strikeforce Challengers: Lindland vs. Casey card against Bobby Voelker. Bowling dominated the first two rounds, but was unable to stop Voelker. The fight ended controversially as it was stopped in the third round due to an unintentional eye injury. Per the rules, the fight went to the judges' scorecards and Bowling was awarded a unanimous decision win.

Bowling and Voelker had a rematch in the main event of the Strikeforce Challengers: Bowling vs. Voelker card on October 22, 2010. After controlling the action in the first round, demonstrating his speed and striking advantage, Bowling lost the fight in the second round via TKO (strikes), after being hurt by Voelker's ground and pound technique, and was given his first professional loss. Bowling and Voelker fought for a third time at Strikeforce Challengers: Voelker vs. Bowling III to create Strikeforce's first trilogy. Once again, Voelker won the fight via TKO in the second round.

Bowling next faced Jerron Peoples at Strikeforce: Melendez vs. Masvidal on December 17, 2011. Despite Peoples weighing in nearly 10 pounds heavy, Bowling won the fight via knockout at just under a minute in the first round.

On March 3, 2012, Bowling faced Brandon Saling at Strikeforce: Tate vs. Rousey in Columbus, Ohio and won via TKO in the second round.

=== Ultimate Fighting Championship ===
In January 2013, the Strikeforce organization was closed by its parent company Zuffa. A list of fighters scheduled to be brought over to the Ultimate Fighting Championship was released in mid-January and Bowling was one of the fighters listed.

Bowling made his UFC and Lightweight debut against Anthony Njokuani on April 20, 2013 at UFC on Fox 7. He lost via second-round knockout.

Bowling faced Abel Trujillo on August 28, 2013 at UFC Fight Night 27. The fight ended in controversial fashion as Trujillo landed what appeared to be an illegal knee to the face of Bowling at the end of round two. With Bowling unable to continue, the referee deemed the bout a no contest. In a post-fight interview with Ariel Helwani, Bowling was upset as he felt he had been winning the fight until the illegal knee, and wanted a rematch with Trujillo.

A rematch with Trujillo took place on December 14, 2013 at UFC on Fox 9. Bowling lost via TKO in the second round, and was released from the promotion shortly after the fight.

== Personal life ==
Bowling is married and has a daughter. Aside from professional fighting, he works for an engineering company that builds custom machinery.

== Championships and accomplishments ==
=== Mixed martial arts ===
- American Fight League
  - American Fight League Amateur Middleweight Championship (One time)
- Caged Inferno
  - Caged Inferno Amateur Middleweight Championship (One time)
- MMA Big Show
  - MMA Big Show Welterweight Championship (One time)
- Revolution Fight League
  - Revolution Fight League Welterweight Championship (One time)

== Mixed martial arts record ==
Professional record breakdown
19 matches	12 wins	6 losses
By knockout	8	4
By submission	2	1
By decision	2	1
No contests	1	

Res.	Record	Opponent	Method	Event	Date	Round	Time	Location	Notes
Loss	12–6 (1)	Nicolae Cury	Submission (armbar)	Z Promotions: Fight Night Medicine Hat 2	October 28, 2016	1	3:38	Medicine Hat, Alberta, Canada	
Win	12–5 (1)	Joshua Thorpe	KO (punches)	Absolute Action 43	August 29, 2015	1	1:37	Highland Heights, Kentucky, United States	Return to Welterweight.
Loss	11–5 (1)	Abel Trujillo	TKO (punches)	UFC on Fox: Johnson vs. Benavidez 2	December 14, 2013	2	1:35	Sacramento, California, United States	
NC	11–4 (1)	Abel Trujillo	NC (illegal knee)	UFC Fight Night: Condit vs. Kampmann 2	August 28, 2013	2	4:57	Indianapolis, Indiana, United States	Trujillo landed an illegal knee and Bowling was unable to continue.
Loss	11–4	Anthony Njokuani	KO (punch)	UFC on Fox: Henderson vs. Melendez	April 20, 2013	2	2:52	San Jose, California, United States	Lightweight debut.
Loss	11–3	Tarec Saffiedine	Decision (unanimous)	Strikeforce: Rousey vs. Kaufman	August 18, 2012	3	5:00	San Diego, California, United States	
Win	11–2	Brandon Saling	TKO (punches)	Strikeforce: Tate vs. Rousey	March 3, 2012	2	1:15	Columbus, Ohio, United States	
Win	10–2	Jerron Peoples	KO (punches)	Strikeforce: Melendez vs. Masvidal	December 17, 2011	1	0:42	San Diego, California, United States	Catchweight (181 lbs) bout; Peoples missed weight.
Loss	9–2	Bobby Voelker	TKO (knee and punches)	Strikeforce Challengers: Voelker vs. Bowling III	July 22, 2011	2	2:16	Las Vegas, Nevada, United States	
Win	9–1	Josh Thornburg	Decision (unanimous)	Strikeforce: Feijao vs. Henderson	March 5, 2011	3	5:00	Columbus, Ohio, United States	
Loss	8–1	Bobby Voelker	TKO (punches)	Strikeforce Challengers: Bowling vs. Voelker	October 22, 2010	2	3:58	Fresno, California, United States	
Win	8–0	Bobby Voelker	Technical Decision (unanimous)	Strikeforce Challengers: Lindland vs. Casey	May 21, 2010	3	1:38	Portland, Oregon, United States	Voelker poked Bowling in the eye and Bowling was unable to continue.
Win	7–0	Jerrod Appenzeller	TKO (punches)	MMA Big Show: Triple Threat	February 20, 2010	2	0:14	Vevay, Indiana, United States	Defended the MMA Big Show Welterweight Championship.
Win	6–0	Devon Plaisance	TKO (punches)	MMA Big Show: Unstoppable	July 25, 2009	1	0:41	Vevay, Indiana, United States	Defended the MMA Big Show Welterweight Championship.
Win	5–0	Seth Baczynski	KO (punches)	MMA Big Show: Retribution	March 7, 2009	1	0:09	Vevay, Indiana, United States	Defended the MMA Big Show Welterweight Championship.
Win	4–0	Paul Mann	Submission (guillotine choke)	MMA Big Show: Relentless	November 1, 2008	1	3:20	Covington, Kentucky, United States	Defended the MMA Big Show Welterweight Championship.
Win	3–0	Shamar Bailey	TKO (punches)	RFL: Hostile Takeover	April 26, 2008	1	0:28	Louisville, Kentucky, United States	Won the RFL Welterweight Championship.
Win	2–0	Michael Skiba	TKO (submission to punches)	MMA Big Show: Punishment	September 29, 2007	1	1:25	Covington, Kentucky, United States	Won the MMA Big Show Welterweight Championship.
Win	1–0	Chris Runge	TKO (punches)	MMA Big Show: Domination	June 23, 2007	1	1:56	Cincinnati, Ohio, United States	
