= Erik Apple =

American mixed martial arts fighter

- Born: August 26, 1977 (age 49); Laguna Niguel, California, U.S.
- Other names: Bad Apple
- Height: 6 ft 0 in (1.83 m)
- Weight: 170 lb (77 kg; 12 st)
- Division: Welterweight
- Reach: 78 in (198 cm)
- Style: Vale Tudo
- Fighting out of: Costa Mesa, California
- Team: Kings MMA
- Rank: Purple belt in Brazilian Jiu-Jitsu
- Years active: 2002-still active

Mixed martial arts record
- Total: 13
- Wins: 10
- By knockout: 4
- By submission: 5
- By decision: 1
- Losses: 3
- By knockout: 1
- By submission: 2

Other information
- Mixed martial arts record from Sherdog

Erik Apple (born August 26, 1977) is an American former professional mixed martial arts fighter. A professional competitor from 1989 until 2011, he fought for the WEC, Strikeforce, King of the Cage, and ShoXC. Apple also played the character of Pete "Mad Dog" Grimes in the 2011 film Warrior.

== Career ==
Apple began to train with vale-tudo and MMA legend Marco Ruas at Ruas Vale Tudo team. Now Erik Apple trains at CSW training center with fighters Josh Barnett and Renato Sobral. He beat Matt Makowski at ShoXC – Elite Challenger Series and is currently signed with Strikeforce in the welterweight division. His Strikeforce debut came in a loss to Bobby Voelker. Erik Apple was announced against Seth Baczynski at Strikeforce: Diaz vs. Noons II, but was forced out of the bout due to an injury. Apple then faced Ryan Larson at Strikeforce Challengers: Beerbohm vs. Healy, losing by triangle choke in the second round.

== Mixed martial arts record ==
Professional record breakdown
| 13 matches | 10 wins | 3 losses |
| By knockout | 3 | 1 |
| By submission | 6 | 2 |
| By decision | 1 | 0 |

| Res. | Record | Opponent | Method | Event | Date | Round | Time | Location | Notes |
|---|---|---|---|---|---|---|---|---|---|
| Loss | 10–3 | Ryan Larson | Submission (triangle choke) | Strikeforce Challengers: Beerbohm vs. Healy | February 18, 2011 | 2 | 3:14 | Cedar Park, Texas, United States | |
| Loss | 10–2 | Bobby Voelker | TKO (punches) | Strikeforce Challengers: Woodley vs. Bears | November 20, 2009 | 2 | 1:23 | Kansas City, Kansas, United States | |
| Win | 10–1 | Matt Makowski | Submission (rear-naked choke) | ShoXC: Elite Challenger Series | September 26, 2008 | 2 | 2:04 | Santa Ynez, California, United States | |
| Loss | 9–1 | Brock Larson | Submission (kimura) | WEC 26: Condit vs. Alessio | March 24, 2007 | 1 | 3:43 | Las Vegas, Nevada, United States | |
| Win | 9–0 | Ray Elbe | TKO (knee and punches) | TC 16: Annihilation | September 9, 2006 | 3 | 2:00 | San Diego, California, United States | |
| Win | 8–0 | Steve Ramirez | Submission (triangle choke) | GC 50: Top Gunz | May 21, 2006 | 1 | 2:37 | Porterville, California, United States | |
| Win | 7–0 | Danny Wren | Decision (unanimous) | Total Combat 12 | December 17, 2005 | 3 | 5:00 | Tijuana, Mexico | |
| Win | 6–0 | Mark Kempthorne | TKO (corner stoppage) | KOTC 54: Mucho Machismo | June 12, 2005 | 2 | 1:57 | San Jacinto, California, United States | |
| Win | 5–0 | Josh Thompson | Submission (verbal) | Total Combat 8 | April 2, 2005 | 1 | N/A | Tijuana, Mexico | |
| Win | 4–0 | Stacy Hakes | Submission (punches) | Total Combat 7 | January 29, 2005 | 1 | N/A | Tijuana, Mexico | |
| Win | 3–0 | Luiz Torres | TKO (punch) | Total Combat 6 | October 24, 2004 | 1 | 2:10 | Tijuana, Mexico | |
| Win | 2–0 | Hector Carrilo | Submission (strikes) | Total Combat 2 | February 29, 2004 | 2 | 1:35 | Tijuana, Mexico | |
| Win | 1–0 | Chris McMillen | Submission (choke) | Gladiator Challenge 15 | April 13, 2003 | 1 | 1:56 | Porterville, California, United States | |
