= Devin Cole =

American MMA fighter (born 1976)

- Born: October 1, 1976 (age 50); Medford, Oregon, United States
- Height: 6 ft 4 in (1.93 m)
- Weight: 249 lb (113 kg; 17.8 st)
- Division: Heavyweight
- Reach: 80 1/2 in (204 cm)
- Fighting out of: Portland, Oregon
- Team: Team Quest
- Years active: 2003–present

Mixed martial arts record
- Total: 31
- Wins: 20
- By knockout: 10
- By submission: 3
- By decision: 7
- Losses: 10
- By knockout: 3
- By submission: 3
- By decision: 4
- Draws: 1

Other information
- Mixed martial arts record from Sherdog

Devin Cole (born October 1, 1976) is an American mixed martial artist. He is a veteran of the Seattle Tiger Sharks and Portland Wolfpack in the IFL, and has also competed in the WEC, Strikeforce, the World Series of Fighting, and Shark Fights.

== Early life ==
Cole has wrestled his entire life, from third grade through college. In 2001 he received All-American honors while leading Southern Oregon University to a national championship. While coaching at Southern Oregon University that Cole coached fellow IFL fighter and TUF contestant Mike Whitehead. He credits Whitehead for getting him involved in MMA.

== MMA career ==
On July 9, 2005, Devin began his pro MMA career at the SF11: Rumble on the Rose Garden event, where he defeated South African kickboxer Rico Hattingh by unanimous decision. Cole went on to compile a professional record of 18-8-1 including notable wins over Mike Kyle and Travis Wiuff before signing with Strikeforce.

=== Strikeforce ===
Cole made his Strikeforce debut at Strikeforce Challengers: Woodley vs. Saffiedine on January 7, 2011, in Nashville, Tennessee, against Daniel Cormier. He lost the fight via unanimous decision.

Cole rebounded from his loss to Cormier on July 22, 2011, at Strikeforce Challengers: Voelker vs. Bowling III, defeating newcomer Shawn Jordan via unanimous decision (29-28, 29-28, 29-28).

Cole won for the second consecutive time in Strikeforce via unanimous decision over Gabriel Salinas-Jones on December 17, 2011, at Strikeforce: Melendez vs. Masvidal.

=== World Series of Fighting ===
Cole headlined the debut event from the World Series of Fighting against former UFC Heavyweight Champion Andrei Arlovski on November 3, 2012, in Las Vegas, Nevada.

== Personal life ==
Devin married his wife Lyndsey on June 4, 2005, in Ashland, OR.

=== Arrest ===
On June 14, 2008, Cole was arrested by the Medford, Oregon police department and charged with first-degree rape, two counts of first-degree sodomy and two counts of first-degree sexual penetration. The charges were later reduced to assault in the fourth degree and sexual harassment, to which Cole pleaded guilty. He was sentenced to 60 days in jail. The incident was cited as the reason why Cole's planned UFC debut at UFC on FOX 4 in August 2012 against Travis Browne was scrapped, despite being among Strikeforce's heavyweight roster (and coming off of two wins) when their heavyweight division was folded at the end of 2011. He was later found innocent of all accounts and charges.

== Mixed martial arts record ==
Professional record breakdown
31 matches	20 wins	10 losses
By knockout	10	3
By submission	3	3
By decision	7	4
Draws	1	

Res.	Record	Opponent	Method	Event	Date	Round	Time	Location	Notes
Loss	20–10–1	Andrei Arlovski	TKO (punches)	World Series of Fighting 1	November 3, 2012	1	2:37	Las Vegas, Nevada, United States	
Win	20–9–1	Gabriel Salinas-Jones	Decision (unanimous)	Strikeforce: Melendez vs. Masvidal	December 17, 2011	3	5:00	San Diego, California, United States	
Win	19–9–1	Shawn Jordan	Decision (unanimous)	Strikeforce Challengers: Voelker vs. Bowling III	July 22, 2011	3	5:00	Las Vegas, Nevada, United States	
Loss	18–9–1	Daniel Cormier	Decision (unanimous)	Strikeforce Challengers: Woodley vs. Saffiedine	January 7, 2011	3	5:00	Nashville, Tennessee, United States	
Loss	18–8–1	Aaron Rosa	Decision (unanimous)	Shark Fights 13: Jardine vs Prangley	September 11, 2010	3	5:00	Amarillo, Texas, United States	
Win	18–7–1	Trevor Smith	TKO (punches)	Rumble on the Ridge 12	August 27, 2010	1	0:31	Snoqualmie, Washington, United States	
Win	17–7–1	Jason Riley	TKO (punches)	UMMAXX 10: Collision Course	March 27, 2010	1	0:14	Euclid, Ohio, United States	
Win	16–7–1	Garren Smith	TKO (punches)	Brass Knuckle Promotions	December 19, 2009	1	2:40	Medford, Oregon, United States	
Win	15–7–1	Josh Bennett	TKO (punches)	Brass Knuckle Promotions	August 22, 2009	2	1:58	Medford, Oregon, United States	
Win	14–7–1	Mike Hayes	Decision (unanimous)	Rumble on the Ridge 4	August 15, 2009	3	3:00	Snoqualmie, Washington, United States	
Draw	13–7–1	Mike Hayes	Draw (majority)	Fight Night: Bikes & Brawls	June 27, 2009	3	5:00	Canyonville, Oregon, United States	
Win	13–7	D.J. Linderman	Decision (unanimous)	BKP - Cinco de Massacre	May 16, 2009	3	3:00	Medford, Oregon, United States	
Loss	12–7	D.J. Linderman	Submission (rear-naked choke)	BKP - Night of Champions	January 24, 2009	1	4:28	Medford, Oregon, United States	
Win	12–6	Vince Lucero	TKO (punches)	PFC 8: A Night of Champions	May 8, 2008	1	1:17	Lemoore, California, United States	
Loss	11–6	Orvil Palmer	Decision (split)	IFL: Everett	June 1, 2007	3	4:00	Everett, Washington, United States	
Win	11–5	Bryan Vetell	KO (punches)	IFL: Connecticut	April 13, 2007	2	1:42	Uncasville, Connecticut, United States	
Loss	10–5	Rafael Cavalcante	TKO (punches)	IFL: Atlanta	February 23, 2007	2	0:26	Atlanta, Georgia, United States	
Loss	10–4	Ben Rothwell	KO (head kick)	IFL: Championship Final	December 29, 2006	1	3:16	Uncasville, Connecticut, United States	
Loss	10–3	Krzysztof Soszynski	Submission (armbar)	IFL: World Championship Semifinals	November 2, 2006	2	1:14	Portland, Oregon, United States	
Loss	10–2	Allan Goes	Submission (guillotine choke)	IFL: Portland	September 9, 2006	1	2:05	Portland, Oregon, United States	
Win	10–1	Travis Wiuff	Decision (unanimous)	IFL: Championship 2006	June 3, 2006	3	4:00	Atlantic City, New Jersey, United States	
Win	9–1	Carlos Cline	Decision (unanimous)	IFL: Legends Championship 2006	April 29, 2006	3	4:00	Atlantic City, New Jersey, United States	
Win	8–1	Mike Kyle	TKO (punches)	WEC 18: Unfinished Business	January 13, 2006	2	2:56	Lemoore, California, United States	
Loss	7–1	Jeff Monson	Decision (unanimous)	XFC: Dome of Destruction 3	October 15, 2005	3	5:00	Tacoma, Washington, United States	
Win	7–0	Ulysses Castro	TKO (punches)	National Fighting Challenge 4	September 9, 2005	1	2:42	Vancouver, British Columbia, Canada	
Win	6–0	Brian Stromberg	Submission (guillotine choke)	UCF: Night of Champions	August 27, 2005	N/A	N/A	Medford, Oregon, United States	
Win	5–0	Rico Hattingh	Decision (unanimous)	SF 11: Rumble at the Rose Garden	July 9, 2005	3	5:00	Portland, Oregon, United States	
Win	4–0	Luis Haro	Submission	UCF: Battle at the Border 2	October 9, 2004	3	N/A	Medford, Oregon, United States	
Win	3–0	Manuel Alvarez	TKO (punches)	UCF: Battle at the Border 1	July 10, 2004	N/A	N/A	Medford, Oregon, United States	
Win	2–0	Josh Bennett	TKO (punches)	FCFF: Fight Night 4	May 15, 2004	1	N/A	Medford, Oregon, United States	
Win	1–0	Delon Williams	Submission	FCFF: Rumble at the Roseland 9	July 12, 2003	2	2:07	Portland, Oregon, United States	
