= Mike Hayes (fighter) =

American mixed martial arts fighter

- Born: Michael Hayes; October 16, 1980 (age 46); Cle Elum, Washington, United States
- Other names: 300
- Nationality: American
- Height: 6 ft 4 in (1.93 m)
- Weight: 205 lb (93 kg; 14.6 st)
- Division: Heavyweight; Light Heavyweight
- Reach: 76.0
- Fighting out of: Redmond, Washington, United States
- Team: Ring Demon Jiu-Jitsu
- Years active: 2007–present

Mixed martial arts record
- Total: 34
- Wins: 20
- By knockout: 8
- By submission: 6
- By decision: 6
- Losses: 12
- By knockout: 1
- By decision: 11
- Draws: 2

Other information
- Mixed martial arts record from Sherdog
- Last updated on: November 9, 2015

Michael Hayes (born October 16, 1980) is an American mixed martial artist currently competing in the Light Heavyweight division. A professional competitor since 2007, he has competed for Bellator, Strikeforce, Cage Warriors, King of the Cage, the Palace Fighting Championship, the World Series of Fighting, KSW, and Fight Nights Global.

== Mixed martial arts career ==
Hayes' debut for Bellator was on June 10, 2010, at Bellator 21, where he defeated Steve Banks by unanimous decision.

Hayes entered the second heavyweight tournament in Bellator's fifth season. He faced UFC veteran Neil Grove at Bellator 52 and won the back-and-forth bout via split decision.

Hayes faced Andreas Kraniotakes for the vacant Cage Warriors Fighting Championship heavyweight title on March 16, 2012. He won the bout and title via submission in the third round.

Hayes fought D.J. Linderman in a rematch for the Cage Warriors Fighting Championship heavyweight title at Cage Warriors 47 and lost the fight via decision.

Hayes was expected to fight former UFC light heavyweight veteran Thiago Silva at Fight Time 20 on August 29, 2014. However, Silva sustained a knee injury and the fight was cancelled.

== Championships and accomplishments ==
- Cage Warriors
  - CWFC Heavyweight Championship (One time)

== Mixed martial arts record ==
Professional record breakdown
34 matches	20 wins	12 losses
By knockout	8	1
By submission	6	0
By decision	6	11
Draws	2	

Res.	Record	Opponent	Method	Event	Date	Round	Time	Location	Notes
Loss	20–12–2	Tony Lopez	Decision (unanimous)	King of the Cage: Provoked	August 6, 2016	5	5:00	Lincoln City, Oregon, United States	Light Heavyweight debut. For the vacant KOTC Light Heavyweight Championship.
Win	20–11–2	Jamelle Jones	Decision (split)	King of the Cage: Battle Zone	May 19, 2016	3	5:00	Worley, Idaho, United States	Catchweight (215 lbs) bout.
Loss	19–11–2	Josh Copeland	Decision (unanimous)	WSOF 29	March 12, 2016	3	5:00	Greeley, Colorado, United States	
Draw	19–10–2	Trevor Prangley	Draw (split)	King of the Cage: Awakening	June 4, 2015	3	5:00	Worley, Idaho, United States	
Loss	19–10–1	Josh Queen	Decision (unanimous)	KOTC: Short Fuse	February 12, 2015	3	5:00	Worley, Idaho, United States	
Loss	19–9–1	Virgil Zwicker	KO (punch)	KSW 25	December 7, 2013	1	1:12	Wrocław, Poland	
Win	19–8–1	Jeff Monson	TKO (head kick and punches)	Cage Warrior Combat 9	November 2, 2013	3	1:21	Kent, Washington, United States	
Loss	18–8–1	D.J. Linderman	Decision (unanimous)	War MMA 1	June 22, 2013	3	5:00	Stockton, California, United States	
Loss	18–7–1	Ruslan Magomedov	Decision (unanimous)	Fight Nights: Battle of Moscow 10	February 23, 2013	3	5:00	Moscow, Russia	
Loss	18–6–1	Andrei Arlovski	Decision (unanimous)	Fight Nights: Battle of Moscow 9	December 16, 2012	3	5:00	Moscow, Russia	
Loss	18–5–1	D.J. Linderman	Decision (unanimous)	Cage Warriors: 47	June 2, 2012	5	5:00	Dublin, Ireland	Lost the Cage Warriors Heavyweight Championship.
Win	18–4–1	Andreas Kraniotakes	Submission (Kimura)	Cage Warriors Fight Night 4	March 16, 2012	3	4:20	Dubai, United Arab Emirates	Won the vacant Cage Warriors Heavyweight Championship.
Win	17–4–1	Neil Grove	Decision (split)	Bellator 52	October 1, 2011	3	5:00	Lake Charles, Louisiana, United States	Bellator Season Five Heavyweight Tournament Quarterfinal.
Win	16–4–1	Tony King	Submission (rear-naked choke)	Cage Warrior Combat: The Fight Factory	August 6, 2011	3	1:32	Marysville, Washington, United States	
Win	15–4–1	Matt Kovacs	Submission (rear-naked choke)	Rumble on the Ridge 16	January 15, 2011	3	4:23	Snoqualmie, Washington, United States	
Win	14–4–1	Josh Bennett	TKO (doctor stoppage)	ROTR 15: Vindication	December 4, 2010	1	1:37	Snoqualmie, Washington, United States	
Win	13–4–1	Matt Walker	Submission (rear-naked choke)	ROTR 14: Defiance	October 30, 2010	2	4:37	Snoqualmie, Washington, United States	
Loss	12–4–1	Alexey Oleynik	Decision (split)	Bellator 26	August 26, 2010	3	5:00	Kansas City, Missouri, United States	Bellator Season Three Heavyweight Tournament Quarterfinal.
Win	12–3–1	Steven Banks	Decision (unanimous)	Bellator 21	June 10, 2010	3	5:00	Hollywood, Florida, United States	
Win	11–3–1	Daniel Stewart	Decision (unanimous)	Rumble on the Ridge 6: Regeneration	January 9, 2010	3	5:00	Snoqualmie, Washington, United States	
Win	10–3–1	Fabiano Scherner	KO (punch)	ROTR 6: Final Countdown	November 21, 2009	2	3:50	Snoqualmie, Washington, United States	
Win	9–3–1	Josh Queen	KO (punch)	SF 26: Domination	October 2, 2009	1	4:53	Grand Ronde, Oregon, United States	
Loss	8–3–1	Devin Cole	Decision (unanimous)	Rumble on the Ridge 4	August 15, 2009	3	3:00	Snoqualmie, Washington, United States	
Win	8–2–1	Daniel Krug	TKO (punches)	CageSport 6	July 25, 2009	1	5:00	Tacoma, Washington, United States	
Draw	7–2–1	Devin Cole	Majority Draw	Fight Night: Bikes & Brawls	June 27, 2009	3	5:00	Canyonville, Oregon, United States	
Loss	7–2	D.J. Linderman	Decision (unanimous)	Alliance: The Uprising	May 2, 2009	3	5:00	Kent, Washington, United States	
Loss	7–1	Mario Miranda	Decision (unanimous)	Carnage at the Creek 5	March 12, 2009	3	5:00	Shelton, Washington, United States	
Win	7–0	Rick Cheek	TKO (submission to punches)	PFC: Best of Both Worlds	February 6, 2009	2	1:01	Lemoore, California, United States	
Win	6–0	Jeremiah Constant	TKO (injury)	CageSport MMA	November 29, 2008	1	2:52	Tacoma, Washington, United States	
Win	5–0	Josh Bennett	Submission (rear naked choke)	CageSport MMA	August 30, 2008	3	3:01	Tacoma, Washington, United States	
Win	4–0	Kyle Keeney	Decision (unanimous)	CS: Freedom Fights	June 7, 2008	3	5:00	Tacoma, Washington, United States	
Win	3–0	Matt Kovacs	Decision (unanimous)	Strikeforce: At The Dome	February 23, 2008	3	5:00	Tacoma, Washington, United States	
Win	2–0	Ryan Hills	Submission (rear-naked choke)	GF: A New Beginning for an Ancient Art	November 10, 2007	1	2:06	Kirkland, Washington, United States	
Win	1–0	Ian Allen	TKO (punches)	RSU: Black Eye Invitational 6	October 6, 2007	2	2:00	Bellevue, Washington, United States	

== See also ==
- List of male mixed martial artists
