= Shawn Jordan =

American mixed martial artist (born 1984)

- Born: Shawn Martin Jordan; October 24, 1984 (age 41); El Paso, Texas, U.S.
- Other names: The Savage
- Nationality: American
- Height: 6 ft 0 in (183 cm)
- Weight: 265 lb (120 kg; 18 st 13 lb)
- Division: Heavyweight
- Reach: 75 in (190 cm)
- Fighting out of: Albuquerque, New Mexico, U.S.
- Team: Jackson's Submission Fighting
- Years active: 2009-2018

Mixed martial arts record
- Total: 28
- Wins: 19
- By knockout: 15
- By submission: 3
- By decision: 1
- Losses: 9
- By knockout: 5
- By decision: 4

Other information
- Mixed martial arts record from Sherdog

Shawn Martin Jordan (born October 24, 1984) is an American professional mixed martial artist who last competed in the Professional Fighters League's Heavyweight division. A professional competitor since 2009, Jordan has also formerly competed for Strikeforce, Bellator MMA and the Ultimate Fighting Championship.

== Background ==
Jordan was born and raised in El Paso, Texas, attending Riverside High School where he excelled in football, basketball, wrestling, and track and field. Jordan was a two-time state champion in wrestling, was ranked as one of the top ten fullbacks in the country for football, and was the starting center on the basketball team for his freshman, sophomore, and junior seasons. Jordan continued his football career with a scholarship to Louisiana State University (LSU) under coach Nick Saban and then coach Les Miles where he was a member of LSU's 2003 BCS National Championship and 2007 BCS National Championship teams.

Jordan also had a cameo appearance in the film Philly Kid where he portrayed a Russian fighter by the name of Andres Titov.

== Mixed martial arts career ==
=== Early career ===
Jordan made his amateur mixed martial arts debut in February 2008, which he lost. He rebounded in January 2009 with a TKO victory.

He made his professional mixed martial arts debut in May 2009 for Bellator and won via submission. Jordan then competed in various promotions over the next three years, amassing a record of 11–2 before joining Strikeforce.

=== Strikeforce ===
Jordan debuted for the promotion on June 22, 2011, where he lost a unanimous decision to Devin Cole. Three months later Jordan fought Lavar Johnson, whom he defeated via submission in the second round.

With the dissolution of the Strikeforce Heavyweight division, Jordan was one of the first announced Heavyweight fighters to make the transition to the UFC.

=== Ultimate Fighting Championship ===
Jordan made his official debut against UFC newcomer Oli Thompson at UFC on FX 2. He won the fight via TKO in the second round after dominating the fight with his striking.

In his second UFC fight, Jordan replaced an injured Antônio Rodrigo Nogueira to face Cheick Kongo on July 21, 2012, at UFC 149. He lost the fight via unanimous decision.

Jordan faced Mike Russow on January 26, 2013, at UFC on Fox: Johnson vs. Dodson. Despite losing the first round to Russow, Jordan was able to mount a comeback in the second round and won via TKO.

Jordan faced Pat Barry on June 15, 2013, at UFC 161. Jordan defeated Barry via first-round TKO. The win also delivered Jordan his first Knockout of the Night bonus award.

Jordan faced Gabriel Gonzaga on October 19, 2013, at UFC 166. He lost the fight via knockout at 1:33 of the first round.

Jordan faced Matt Mitrione on March 1, 2014, at UFC Fight Night: Kim vs. Hathaway. He lost the fight via knockout at 4:59 of the first round.

Jordan next faced Jack May at UFC Fight Night 47 on August 16, 2014. He won the back-and-forth fight via TKO in the third round.

Jordan faced UFC newcomer Jared Cannonier at UFC 182 on January 3, 2015. He won the fight via knockout in the first round. The win also earned Jordan his first Performance of the Night bonus award.

Jordan had a rematch with Derrick Lewis on June 6, 2015, at UFC Fight Night 68. In their first encounter on the regional circuit in 2010, Jordan won by unanimous decision. He won the fight by technical knockout in the second round. The win also earned Jordan his second consecutive Performance of the Night bonus award.

Jordan faced Ruslan Magomedov in the last fight of his contract on October 3, 2015, at UFC 192. He lost the fight via unanimous decision.

=== World Series of Fighting ===
On April 28, 2016, it was announced that Jordan had signed a contract with World Series of Fighting.

Jordan faced Ashley Gooch on October 7, 2016, at WSOF 33. He won the fight via TKO in the first round.

On January 1, 2017, it was announced that Jordan would face reigning heavyweight champion Blagoy Ivanov for the title at WSOF 35. The event was originally scheduled for February 28 (incorrectly reported as Feb 25) but was rescheduled to March 18. Jordan lost the fight via TKO in the first round.

Jordan faced Josh Copeland on July 19, 2018, at PFL 4. He lost the fight via unanimous decision.

== Championships and accomplishments ==
- Ultimate Fighting Championship
  - Knockout of the Night (One time) vs. Pat Barry
  - Performance of the Night (Two times) vs. Jared Cannonier and Derrick Lewis

== Mixed martial arts record ==
Professional record breakdown
28 matches	19 wins	9 losses
By knockout	15	5
By submission	3	0
By decision	1	4

Res.	Record	Opponent	Method	Event	Date	Round	Time	Location	Notes
Loss	19–9	Josh Copeland	Decision (unanimous)	PFL 4	July 19, 2018	3	5:00	Uniondale, New York, United States	
Loss	19–8	Blagoy Ivanov	TKO (punches)	WSOF 35	March 18, 2017	1	1:43	Verona, New York, United States	For the WSOF Heavyweight Championship.
Win	19–7	Ashley Gooch	TKO (punches)	WSOF 33	October 7, 2016	1	4:40	Kansas City, Missouri, United States	
Loss	18–7	Ruslan Magomedov	Decision (unanimous)	UFC 192	October 3, 2015	3	5:00	Houston, Texas, United States	
Win	18–6	Derrick Lewis	TKO (hook kick and punches)	UFC Fight Night: Boetsch vs. Henderson	June 6, 2015	2	0:48	New Orleans, Louisiana, United States	Performance of the Night.
Win	17–6	Jared Cannonier	KO (punches)	UFC 182	January 3, 2015	1	2:57	Las Vegas, Nevada, United States	Performance of the Night.
Win	16–6	Jack May	TKO (punches)	UFC Fight Night: Bader vs. St. Preux	August 16, 2014	3	2:55	Bangor, Maine, United States	
Loss	15–6	Matt Mitrione	KO (punches)	The Ultimate Fighter China Finale: Kim vs. Hathaway	March 1, 2014	1	4:59	Macau, SAR, China	
Loss	15–5	Gabriel Gonzaga	KO (punches)	UFC 166	October 19, 2013	1	1:33	Houston, Texas, United States	
Win	15–4	Pat Barry	TKO (punches)	UFC 161	June 15, 2013	1	0:59	Winnipeg, Manitoba, Canada	Knockout of the Night.
Win	14–4	Mike Russow	TKO (punches)	UFC on Fox: Johnson vs. Dodson	January 26, 2013	2	3:48	Chicago, Illinois, United States	
Loss	13–4	Cheick Kongo	Decision (unanimous)	UFC 149	July 21, 2012	3	5:00	Calgary, Alberta, Canada	
Win	13–3	Oli Thompson	TKO (knee and punches)	UFC on FX: Alves vs. Kampmann	March 3, 2012	2	1:07	Sydney, Australia	
Win	12–3	Lavar Johnson	Submission (americana)	Strikeforce Challengers: Larkin vs. Rossborough	September 23, 2011	2	3:08	Las Vegas, Nevada, United States	
Loss	11–3	Devin Cole	Decision (unanimous)	Strikeforce Challengers: Voelker vs. Bowling III	July 22, 2011	3	5:00	Las Vegas, Nevada, United States	
Win	11–2	Kendrick Watkins	TKO (punches)	Gladiator Promotions: Summer Knockouts	July 16, 2011	1	0:19	Denham Springs, Louisiana, United States	
Win	10–2	John Hill	TKO (punches and elbows)	Bellator 45	May 21, 2011	1	1:56	Lake Charles, Louisiana, United States	
Loss	9–2	Mark Holata	KO (punch)	Bellator 31	September 30, 2010	1	1:13	Lake Charles, Louisiana, United States	
Win	9–1	James Hall	Submission (rear-naked choke)	USA MMA: Stacked	July 31, 2010	1	0:45	Baton Rouge, Louisiana, United States	
Win	8–1	Derrick Lewis	Decision (unanimous)	Cajun Fighting Championships: Full Force	June 25, 2010	3	5:00	Lafayette, Louisiana, United States	
Win	7–1	Kendrick Watkins	KO (punches)	MMA Fight Force: The Final Chapter	May 28, 2010	1	0:37	Baton Rouge, Louisiana, United States	
Win	6–1	Doug Williams	TKO (punches)	Bellator 18	May 13, 2010	1	0:19	Monroe, Louisiana, United States	
Win	5–1	Marcus Kaiser	TKO (punches)	No Love Entertainment: War and Wheels	January 23, 2010	1	0:54	New Orleans, Louisiana, United States	
Win	4–1	Corey Salter	TKO (punches)	USA MMA: Louisiana vs. Florida	October 9, 2009	1	3:18	Baton Rouge, Louisiana, United States	
Loss	3–1	Kenny Garner	KO (punches)	Atlas Fights: Cage Rage 2	September 6, 2009	1	0:51	Biloxi, Mississippi, United States	
Win	3–0	Carlton Haselrig	TKO (punches)	UCFC: Rumble on the Rivers	June 27, 2009	1	2:57	Pittsburgh, Pennsylvania, United States	
Win	2–0	Mahsea Bolea	KO (punch)	Raging Wolf 4: Defiance	June 13, 2009	2	1:02	Irving, New York, United States	
Win	1–0	Jayme Mckinney	Submission (arm-triangle choke)	Bellator 9	May 29, 2009	2	1:39	Monroe, Louisiana, United States	

== Amateur mixed martial arts record ==
Professional record breakdown
2 matches	1 win	1 loss
By knockout	1	1

Res.	Record	Opponent	Method	Event	Date	Round	Time	Location	Notes
Win	1–1	Chris Kissam	TKO (punches)	No Love Entertainment: Full Throttle	January 24, 2009	1	1:02	New Orleans, Louisiana, United States	
Loss	0–1	Scott Barrett	TKO (punches)	RMMA: Renaissance MMA 5	February 9, 2008	1	N/A	Mandeville, Louisiana, United States	

== See also ==
- List of male mixed martial artists
