= Unifight =

Competitive training system

Unifight (Universal Fight)
- Focus: Hybrid
- Hardness: Full Contact
- Country of origin: Russia, Germany
- Creator: Sergey Novikov
- Famous practitioners: Viktor Smoyler , Sergei Kharitonov, Adlan Amagov
- Parenthood: Modern martial art
- Olympic sport: No
- Official website: International Unifight Federation F.I.A.U. www.unifight.com

Unifight (or Universal Fight) is a competitive training system with military applications. The competition is formed of two consecutive stages: the first stage is an obstacle course with close quarters battle – any missed obstacle disqualifies the contestant; the second stage is a bout of full-contact hand-to-hand combat.

== History ==
In the last 10–20 years in the development of martial arts there fundamentally new trend – the emergence of new species based on the integration and aggregation from other sports. For example, in the middle of the 1990s in Russia appeared Unifight (Unifight) – a comprehensive view including the consistent application of exercises on an obstacle course, shooting airguns, sporting knives and hand-to-hand fight in the ring. This sport, originally emerged as a military application, has become quite popular not only in the power structures of various countries, but in the world. The members of the International Amateur Federation Unifight are 32 countries, held 13 World Championships, which were attended by athletes from 35 countries worldwide.

Since 2008, every year regularly conducted nationwide and international competitions on "Unifight" among children 10-11 and 12–13 years old (light- unifight). It allows you to reach regular training and competitions are a significant part of children, adolescents and youth, introduce them to healthy lifestyles, improve their active recreation, to distract from the outdoor elements. Also annually, the championships of Russia, Europe and World among boys and girls 14-15, 16–17 years (according to light – and the classic Unifight), Championship of Russia, Europe and the World Juniors and Juniors 18–20 years (according to the rules Light – Unifight and classic Unifight), European, Asian and World Championships among men and women (according to light – and classic Unifight). Novikov Sergei is the President of the International Amateur Federation "Unifight" and the International Amateur Federation "Winter Unifight", Olympic judo champion.

== Technique ==
Unifight is not a fighting style. It is a method of training and control where all that matters is the application of notions and skills learned in a full-contact system, under circumstances of stress and effort.

Unifight consists of two consecutive stages of physical challenge:

Stage I) completing an obstacle course including firing a rifle or throwing a knife;
Stage II) competing in a one-on-one fight in the ring, commencing one minute after the first stage is completed.

In the first stage, competitors complete the obstacle course on parallel tracks. The first contestant to complete the course is the winner of the first stage and is awarded 1 point. If a contestant fails to overcome any of the obstacles on the third try, then he/she is disqualified.

One minute after completing the first stage, the winner is called into the ring for the one-on-one combat in the second stage. The number of rounds in the second stage is set according to age categories (children, youth, seniors, boys, girls) and contestants’ skills. The duration of the rounds is set according to the competition level and the level of training the contestants have achieved, as defined in the rules and regulations).

=== Stage I. Completing the obstacle track and firing the rifle / throwing the knife ===
The obstacle course must include 10 elements. These elements must involve force and resistance tasks, mandatory official itineraries, and weapon handling challenges. The elements are defined by the competition's rules and regulations, and must be completed in accordance with those rules and regulations.

The obstacle course is 60 m in length and includes the following elements:

1 – a part of the track with unequal segments (tires or maze),
2 – beam; H = 1m; L = 4m.,
3 – fence; H = 2m,
4 – horizontal ladder; H = 2.5m; L=3.5m,
5 – barrier; H = 1.1m,
6 – target for firing a weapon from 15m,
7 – target for throwing the knife from 7m (military challenge),
8 – horizontal cylinder; L = 3m,
9 – fishing net; H = 8-10m,
10 – gymnastics rope; H = 8-10m.

The steps for completing the obstacle course are:

| a) on hearing the command “Start!”, the competitor runs for 6m; | b) the unequal segments section (1) must be completed; | c) 6m run; |
| d) get past the beam (2); | e) over the 2m high fence (3); | f) 7m run |
| g) negotiate the horizontal ladder (4) using only one's arms; (Gripping the first and last bars is mandatory.) | h) 8m run | i) jump over 1.1m high barrier (5); |
| j) 6m run | k) fire 2 rounds at the fixed target 15m ahead (6); | l) 8m run |
| m) throw knife at the fixed target 7m ahead (7); | n) 5m run | o) crawl through the horizontal cylinder (8); |
| p) scale the 8-10m high fishing net (9); | q) descend the 8-10m long rope using both arms and legs (10); | r) 6m run to Finish line. |

The finish line is located next to the ring used in the second stage.

(Internationally known champion Sergei Kharitonov appears in the pictures above.)

=== Stage II. One-on-one fight in the ring ===
The fight in the ring consists of unarmed combat between two fighters using techniques and elements from other full-contact sports within the limits set by the rules and regulations.

At the end of the combat, the winner is the contestant who has prevailed in the most rounds, by KO, or (in the case of the adversary having been choked or having broken an arm or a leg) by forfeit of the adversary.

Practitioners of any full-contact fighting sport, (judo, sambo, boxing, kickboxing, savate, jujutsu, wrestling, BJJ, Muay Thai, MMA), regardless of style, may participate in Universal Fight.

== Championships ==
- 2000 Mondial Championship Orenburg, Russia, 16 countries
- 2001 Mondial Championship Samara, Russia, 20 countries
- 2002 Mondial Championship St. Petersburg, Russia, 21 countries
- 2003 Mondial Championship Kyiv, Ukraine, 25 countries
- 2004 Championnat européen Moscow, Russia, 16 countries
- 2004 Mondial Championship Podgorica, Serbia, 31 countries
- 2005 Mondial Championship St. Petersburg, Russia, 34 countries
- 2006 Mondial Championship Kaliningrad, Russia, 36 countries
- 2007 Mondial Championship Tashkent, Uzbekistan, 32 countries
- 2007 International Cup for Special Forces Mangalia, Romania, 12 countries
- 2008 European Championship Drobeta-Turnu Severin, Romania, 15 countries
- 2008 Mondial Championship Kaliningrad, Russia, 36 countries
- 2008 International Cup for Special Forces Mangalia, Romania, 15 countries
- 2009 European Championship Mangalia, Romania, 15 countries
- 2009 Mondial Championship Prague, Czech Republic, 40 countries
- 2010 European Championship Reșița, Romania, 12 countries,
- 2011 Mondial Championship (Russia, Moscow) 35 countries
- 2012 Mondial Championship (Russia, Medyn) 30 countries
