= Strikeforce: Barnett vs. Kharitonov =

Strikeforce mixed martial arts event in 2011

- The poster for Strikeforce: Barnett vs. Kharitonov
- Promotion: Strikeforce
- Date: September 10, 2011
- Venue: U.S. Bank Arena
- City: Cincinnati, Ohio, United States

Event chronology
Strikeforce: Fedor vs. Henderson	Strikeforce: Barnett vs. Kharitonov	Strikeforce: Melendez vs. Masvidal

Strikeforce: Barnett vs. Kharitonov was a mixed martial arts event held by Strikeforce that served as the Heavyweight Tournament semifinals. The event aired live on Showtime. The event took place on September 10, 2011, at U.S. Bank Arena in Cincinnati, Ohio, United States.

== Background ==
Ronaldo Souza and Luke Rockhold were rumored to meet at Strikeforce: Fedor vs. Henderson, but the bout was moved to this card.

Alistair Overeem was expected to face Antônio Silva in the semifinals of the Strikeforce Heavyweight Grand Prix at this event. However, on July 18 it was announced that Overeem refused to compete at this event, claiming that a toe injury would prevent him from being ready in time. Alistair Overeem was subsequently removed from the tournament and released by the company, he was replaced by Daniel Cormier.

Gegard Mousasi was originally scheduled to face Mike Kyle at this event, but it was later announced that Strikeforce newcomer Marcos Rogério de Lima would replace Mousasi in the bout. The Mousasi/Kyle fight would eventually take place at Strikeforce: Marquardt vs. Saffiedine in January 2013, where Mousasi won by first round submission.

Josh Thomson was scheduled to take on Maximo Blanco at this event. However, on August 23, it was announced Thomson had to withdraw from the bout due to a foot injury. Pat Healy stepped in as Thomson's replacement.

On August 23, 2011, it was announced that the preliminary card for this show would air live on HDNet. This would be the last Strikeforce event to feature televised prelims on HDNet, with remaining 2011 preliminary bouts not being televised, and future preliminary cards were instead shown on Showtime Extreme.

== Results ==
Main card (Showtime)
Weight class				Method	Round	Time	Notes
Heavyweight	Josh Barnett	def.	Sergei Kharitonov	Submission (arm triangle choke)	1	4:28	(Note: Strikeforce Heavyweight Grand Prix Semifinal)
Heavyweight	Daniel Cormier	def.	Antônio Silva	KO (punches)	1	3:56	(Note: Strikeforce Heavyweight Grand Prix Semifinal)
Middleweight	Luke Rockhold	def.	Ronaldo Souza (c)	Decision (unanimous) (50–45, 48–47, 48–47)	5	5:00	(Note: For the Strikeforce Middleweight Championship.)
Light Heavyweight	Muhammed Lawal	def.	Roger Gracie	KO (punches)	1	4:33
Lightweight	Pat Healy	def.	Maximo Blanco	Submission (rear-naked choke)	2	4:27
Preliminary card (HDNet)
Light Heavyweight	Rafael Cavalcante	def.	Yoel Romero	KO (punches)	2	4:51
Welterweight	Jordan Mein	def.	Evangelista Santos	TKO (elbows)	3	3:18
Light Heavyweight	Mike Kyle	def.	Marcos Rogério de Lima	Decision (unanimous) (29–28, 29–28, 30–27)	3	5:00
Women's Bantamweight	Alexis Davis	def.	Amanda Nunes	TKO (punches)	2	4:53
Middleweight	Dominique Steele	def.	Chris Mierzwiak	Decision (unanimous) (29–28, 29–27, 29–27)	3	5:00

== Heavyweight Grand Prix Bracket ==
Quarter-finals
Fedor Emelianenko	RD 2
Antônio Silva	TKO
Alistair Overeem	RD 3
Fabrício Werdum	UD
Andrei Arlovski	RD 1
Sergei Kharitonov	KO
Josh Barnett	RD 2
Brett Rogers	SUB

Semi-finals
Antônio Silva	RD 1
Daniel Cormier**	KO
Sergei Kharitonov	RD 1
Josh Barnett	SUB

Final
Daniel Cormier	UD
Josh Barnett	RD 5

** = Replacement

=== Alternates ===
- Shane Del Rosario
- Chad Griggs

== Reported Payout ==
The following is the reported payout to the fighters as reported to the Ohio Athletic Commission. The salaries listed below do not include fight bonuses, sponsorships, percentages and other unofficial payments. It also does not include deductions for expenses such as insurance, taxes, etc.

- Luke Rockhold: $50,000 ($25,000 win bonus) def. Ronaldo Souza: $70,000
- Josh Barnett: $150,000 (no win bonus) def. Sergei Kharitonov: $100,000
- Daniel Cormier: $100,000 ($50,000 win bonus) def. Antonio Silva: $100,000
- Muhammed Lawal: $85,000 (no win bonus) def. Roger Gracie: $80,000
- Pat Healy: $17,500 ($5,000 win bonus) def. Maximo Blanco: $13,000
- Rafael Calvacante: $60,000 ($30,000 win bonus) def. Yoel Romero: $10,000
- Jordan Mein: $16,000 ($8,000 win bonus) def. Evangelista Santos: $20,000
- Mike Kyle: $44,000 ($22,000 win bonus) def. Marcos Rogério de Lima: $5,000
- Alexis Davis: $6,000 ($3,000 win bonus) def. Amanda Nunes: $7,500
- Dominique Steel: $5,000 ($3,000 win bonus) def. Chris Mierzwiak: $3,000
