= Strikeforce: Melendez vs. Masvidal =

Strikeforce mixed martial arts event in 2011

- The poster for Strikeforce: Melendez vs. Masvidal
- Promotion: Strikeforce
- Date: December 17, 2011
- Venue: Valley View Casino Center
- City: San Diego, California, United States

Event chronology
Strikeforce: Barnett vs. Kharitonov	Strikeforce: Melendez vs. Masvidal	Strikeforce: Rockhold vs. Jardine

Strikeforce: Melendez vs. Masvidal was a mixed martial arts event held by Strikeforce. The event took place on December 17, 2011 at the Valley View Casino Center in San Diego, California, United States.

== Background ==
The main event between Melendez and Masvidal was briefly in question with Dana White's announcement that Melendez was UFC bound, but the match went on as planned.

Keith Jardine was expected to make his Middleweight debut at this event. However, he would instead debut at Strikeforce: Rockhold vs. Jardine the following year.

The Bowling/Peoples bout was supposed to be fought at Welterweight, however it was changed to a 179-pound catchweight. Peoples still missed weight and the fight went on as a 181-pound catchweight fight with Peoples fined 20 percent of his purse.

The bout between Devin Cole & Gabriel Salinas-Jones was the last heavyweight fight in Strikeforce's full Heavyweight division. Two days after this event was held, Strikeforce announced the end of the division (save for Heavyweight Grand Prix Tournament finalists Josh Barnett & Daniel Cormier) due to a lack of depth, and six of the promotion's remaining heavyweight fighters were folded into the UFC shortly afterwards.

Former World Extreme Cagefighting announcer Joe Martinez announced this event in place of Jimmy Lennon Jr., as Lennon was announcing that same night's Showtime-broadcast Super Six World Boxing Classic boxing card headlined by Carl Froch & Andre Ward.

== Results ==
Main Card (Showtime)
Weight class				Method	Round	Time	Notes
Lightweight	Gilbert Melendez (c)	def.	Jorge Masvidal	Decision (unanimous) (50–45, 50–45, 49–46)	5	5:00	(Note: For the Strikeforce Lightweight Championship.)
Women's Featherweight	Cris Cyborg (c)	vs.	Hiroko Yamanaka	No Contest (overturned)	1	0:16	(Note: For the Strikeforce Women's Featherweight Championship. Originally a TKO win for Cyborg, the result was overturned to a "No Contest" when Cyborg subsequently tested positive for Stanozolol in a post-fight drug test.)
Light Heavyweight	Gegard Mousasi	def.	Ovince St. Preux	Decision (unanimous) (29–28, 29–28, 29–28)	3	5:00
Lightweight	K. J. Noons	def.	Billy Evangelista	Decision (unanimous) (29–28, 29–28, 29–28)	3	5:00
Preliminary card
Catchweight (181 lb)	Roger Bowling	def.	Jerron Peoples	KO (punches)	1	0:42
Lightweight	Caros Fodor	def.	Justin Wilcox	KO (punches)	1	0:13
Heavyweight	Devin Cole	def.	Gabriel Salinas-Jones	Decision (unanimous) (30–27, 30–27, 30–27)	3	5:00
Welterweight	Herman Terrado	def.	Chris Brown	Submission (armbar)	3	4:05
Middleweight	Eddie Mendez	def.	Fernando Gonzalez	Decision (split) (30–27, 28–29, 29–28)	3	5:00

== Reported payout ==
The following is the reported payout to the fighters as reported to the California State Athletic Commission. It does not include sponsor money or locker room bonuses.

- Gilbert Melendez: $150,000 (no win bonus) def. Jorge Masvidal: $23,000
- Cris Cyborg: $66,000 (includes $33,000 win bonus) def. Hiroko Yamanaka: $8,000
- Gegard Mousasi: $150,000 (no win bonus) def. Ovince St. Preux: $17,000
- KJ Noons: $65,000 (includes $30,000 win bonus) def. Billy Evangelista: $20,000
- Caros Fodor: $20,000 (includes $10,000 win bonus) def. Justin Wilcox $12,000
- Roger Bowling: $14,000 (includes $7,000 win bonus) def. Jerron Peoples: $2,000
- Devin Cole: $12,000 (includes $6,000 win bonus) def. Gabriel Salinas-Jones: $3,000
- Eddie Mendez: $6,000 (includes $3,000 win bonus) def. Fernando Gonzalez: $3,000
- Herman Terrado: $6,000 (includes $3,000 win bonus) def. Chris Brown: $3,000
