= ShoMMA =

Mixed martial arts series

ShoMMA: Strikeforce Challengers is a mixed martial arts series that was produced by the mixed martial arts organization Strikeforce and the Showtime cable network. Similar to Showtime's earlier ShoXC, the purpose of the series was to highlight up and coming MMA fighters.

Strikeforce Challengers was discontinued with the 2012 Strikeforce deal.

== Events ==
No.	Event	Date	Venue	Location
20	Strikeforce Challengers: Britt vs. Sayers	November 18, 2011	Palms Casino Resort	Las Vegas, Nevada
19	Strikeforce Challengers: Larkin vs. Rossborough	September 23, 2011	Palms Casino Resort	Las Vegas, Nevada
18	Strikeforce Challengers: Gurgel vs. Duarte	August 12, 2011	Palms Casino Resort	Las Vegas, Nevada
17	Strikeforce Challengers: Voelker vs. Bowling III	July 22, 2011	Palms Casino Resort	Las Vegas, Nevada
16	Strikeforce Challengers: Fodor vs. Terry	June 24, 2011	ShoWare Center	Kent, Washington
15	Strikeforce Challengers: Wilcox vs. Damm	April 1, 2011	Stockton Arena	Stockton, California
14	Strikeforce Challengers: Beerbohm vs. Healy	February 18, 2011	Cedar Park Center	Cedar Park, Texas
13	Strikeforce Challengers: Woodley vs. Saffiedine	January 7, 2011	Nashville Municipal Auditorium	Nashville, Tennessee
12	Strikeforce Challengers: Wilcox vs. Ribeiro	November 19, 2010	Jackson Convention Complex	Jackson, Mississippi
11	Strikeforce Challengers: Bowling vs. Voelker	October 22, 2010	Save Mart Center	Fresno, California
10	Strikeforce Challengers: Riggs vs. Taylor	August 13, 2010	Dodge Theatre	Phoenix, Arizona
9	Strikeforce Challengers: del Rosario vs. Mahe	July 23, 2010	Comcast Arena at Everett	Everett, Washington
8	Strikeforce Challengers: Lindland vs. Casey	May 21, 2010	Rose Garden	Portland, Oregon
7	Strikeforce Challengers: Johnson vs. Mahe	March 26, 2010	Save Mart Center	Fresno, California
6	Strikeforce Challengers: Kaufman vs. Hashi	February 26, 2010	San Jose Civic Auditorium	San Jose, California
5	Strikeforce Challengers: Woodley vs. Bears	November 20, 2009	Memorial Hall	Kansas City, Kansas
4	Strikeforce Challengers: Gurgel vs. Evangelista	November 6, 2009	Save Mart Center at Fresno State	Fresno, California
3	Strikeforce Challengers: Kennedy vs. Cummings	September 25, 2009	SpiritBank Event Center	Bixby, Oklahoma
2	Strikeforce Challengers: Villasenor vs. Cyborg	June 19, 2009	ShoWare Center	Kent, Washington
1	Strikeforce Challengers: Evangelista vs. Aina	May 15, 2009	Save Mart Center	Fresno, California

== Notes ==
All Strikeforce women's fights are five-minute rounds (except in one-night tournaments).
