= Quinn Mulhern =

American mixed martial arts fighter (born 1984)

- Born: Quinn Patrick Mulhern; September 20, 1984 (age 42); Santa Cruz, California, United States
- Other names: Campamocha
- Height: 6 ft 3 in (1.91 m)
- Weight: 155 lb (70 kg; 11.1 st)
- Division: Lightweight; Welterweight
- Reach: 76 in (193 cm)
- Fighting out of: Albuquerque, New Mexico, United States
- Team: Jackson's Submission Fighting
- Rank: Black belt in Brazilian Jiu-Jitsu
- Years active: 2007–2014

Mixed martial arts record
- Total: 22
- Wins: 18
- By knockout: 3
- By submission: 11
- By decision: 4
- Losses: 4
- By knockout: 2
- By decision: 2

Other information
- Mixed martial arts record from Sherdog

Quinn Patrick Mulhern (born September 20, 1984) is a retired American professional mixed martial artist who most recently competed in the Welterweight division of the Ultimate Fighting Championship. A professional competitor from 2007 until 2014, Mulhern also competed for Strikeforce, King of the Cage, and is the former King of the Cage Welterweight Champion.

== Background ==
Mulhern is from Santa Cruz, California, and graduated from Harbor High School. Mulhern was introduced to mixed martial arts when he began training in Brazilian jiu-jitsu as a teenager.

== Mixed martial arts career ==
=== Early career ===
In 2007, Mulhern made his professional debut at a Gladiator Challenge event. He fought and defeated Randy Blackwell midway through the first round via submission. His next two fights were both under the King of the Cage banner, both fight were wins for Mulhern, one submission and one close split decision.

After earning a record of 7–0, Mulhern took on the much more experienced, Chris Brennan. Mulhern dominated the fight and won via first round submission using the rare omoplata maneuver. The win earned him a title fight against current UFC fighter, Mike Guymon. The fight was back and forth but late in the fourth round, Guymon defeated Mulhern via TKO, retaining his title.

Mulhern bounced back from his loss to Guymon by defeating Ultimate Fighting Championship veteran Rich Clementi at King of the Cage: Vengeance on February 12, 2010. This bout was a part of King of the Cage's debut on HDNet.

Mulhern captured the King of the Cage Welterweight Championship on March 26, 2010, by defeating Koffi Adzitso at King of the Cage: Legacy. He most recently defeated Joey Gorczynski at King of the Cage: Honor.

Mulhern defended his title for the first time against Levi Stout, defeating Stout via first-round submission.

On December 4, 2010, Mulhern defeated the Canadian King of the Cage Welterweight Champion Garret Davis in a unanimous decision at King of the Cage: Black Ops. This event unified the Canadian King of the Cage and World King of the Cage Welterweight Championships.

=== Strikeforce ===
On May 6, 2011, it was announced that Mulhern had signed a multi-fight deal with Strikeforce. He made his debut at Strikeforce Challengers: Fodor vs. Terry and lost to Jason High via unanimous decision.

Mulhern remained busy with the promotion, having won his next two bouts in Strikeforce on their Challengers series in September and November 2011. He returned in May 2012 as he faced Yuri Villefort at Strikeforce: Barnett vs. Cormier and won the fight via split decision.

For his fifth Strikeforce fight, Mulhern was expected to face Jorge Santiago on September 29, 2012, at Strikeforce: Melendez vs. Healy. However, after the event was cancelled the bout was scrapped.

=== Ultimate Fighting Championship ===
Mulhern made his UFC debut in March 2013 as he faced Rick Story on March 16, 2013, at UFC 158, replacing an injured Sean Pierson. He lost the fight via TKO in the first round.

Mulhern was expected to face Ryan Couture in a lightweight bout on August 31, 2013, at UFC 164. However, Mulhern pulled out of the fight citing a hand injury and was replaced by Al Iaquinta.

Mulhern was expected to face Thiago Tavares on November 9, 2013, at UFC Fight Night 32. However, Mulhern pulled out of the bout citing another injury and was replaced by Justin Salas.

Mulhern faced Katsunori Kikuno on January 4, 2014, at UFC Fight Night 34. He lost the fight via unanimous decision and later announced his retirement from MMA.

== Personal life ==
Mulhern attended St. John's College, graduating in 2008 from their campus in Santa Fe, New Mexico, with a degree in liberal arts.

== Mixed martial arts record ==
Professional record breakdown
22 matches	18 wins	4 losses
By knockout	3	2
By submission	11	0
By decision	4	2

Res.	Record	Opponent	Method	Event	Date	Round	Time	Location	Notes
Loss	18–4	Katsunori Kikuno	Decision (unanimous)	UFC Fight Night: Saffiedine vs. Lim	January 4, 2014	3	5:00	Marina Bay, Singapore	Lightweight debut.
Loss	18–3	Rick Story	TKO (punches)	UFC 158	March 16, 2013	1	3:05	Montreal, Quebec, Canada	
Win	18–2	Yuri Villefort	Decision (split)	Strikeforce: Barnett vs. Cormier	May 19, 2012	3	5:00	San Jose, California, United States	
Win	17–2	David Hulett	Decision (unanimous)	Strikeforce Challengers: Britt vs. Sayers	November 18, 2011	3	5:00	Las Vegas, Nevada, United States	
Win	16–2	Danny Davis	Submission (arm-triangle choke)	Strikeforce Challengers: Larkin vs. Rossborough	September 23, 2011	3	4:08	Las Vegas, Nevada, United States	Mulhern weighed in at 176.5 lb; bout changed from Welterweight to Catchweight.
Loss	15–2	Jason High	Decision (unanimous)	Strikeforce Challengers: Fodor vs. Terry	June 24, 2011	3	5:00	Kent, Washington, United States	Lost the KOTC Welterweight Championship.
Win	15–1	Anselmo Martinez	Submission (rear-naked choke)	KOTC: Texas	April 16, 2011	1	4:48	Lubbock, Texas, United States	Defended the KOTC Welterweight Championship.
Win	14–1	Garett Davis	Decision (unanimous)	KOTC: Black Ops	December 4, 2010	5	5:00	Cold Lake, Alberta, Canada	Defended the KOTC Welterweight Championship.
Win	13–1	Levi Stout	Submission (rear-naked choke)	KOTC: Imminent Danger	August 13, 2010	1	2:52	Mescalero, New Mexico, United States	Defended the KOTC Welterweight Championship.
Win	12–1	Joey Gorczynski	Submission (rear-naked choke)	KOTC: Honor	May 14, 2010	3	0:53	Mescalero, New Mexico, United States	Non-title bout.
Win	11–1	Koffi Adzitso	Submission (rear-naked choke)	KOTC: Legacy	March 26, 2010	2	1:36	Reno, Nevada, United States	Won the vacant KOTC Welterweight Championship.
Win	10–1	Boy Morgan	TKO (punches)	KOTC: Native Warriors	March 6, 2010	1	1:10	Santa Fe, New Mexico, United States	
Win	9–1	Rich Clementi	TKO (punches)	KOTC: Vengeance	February 12, 2010	2	3:09	Mescalero, New Mexico, United States	
Loss	8–1	Mike Guymon	TKO (submission to punch)	KOTC: Distorted	October 1, 2009	4	4:32	Highland, California, United States	For the KOTC Welterweight Championship.
Win	8–0	Chris Brennan	Submission (omoplata)	KOTC: Militia	June 11, 2009	1	2:01	Highland, California, United States	
Win	7–0	Ricky Legere	Submission (triangle choke)	KOTC: New Breed	March 7, 2009	2	2:52	Mescalero, New Mexico, United States	
Win	6–0	Manuel Otero	Submission (rear-naked choke)	KOTC: Goodfellas	December 6, 2008	1	1:55	Albuquerque, New Mexico, United States	
Win	5–0	Brian Grimshaw	TKO (punches)	FW 16: International	November 1, 2008	1	4:22	Albuquerque, New Mexico, United States	
Win	4–0	Blue Edwards	Submission (triangle choke)	Rage in the Cage 113	August 2, 2008	2	0:34	Albuquerque, New Mexico, United States	
Win	3–0	Jeremy Ferguson	Decision (split)	KOTC: Badlands	July 12, 2008	3	3:00	Albuquerque, New Mexico, United States	
Win	2–0	Doug Brown	Submission (armbar)	KOTC: Hierarchy	October 13, 2007	1	1:42	Albuquerque, New Mexico, United States	
Win	1–0	Randy Blackwell	Submission (kimura)	GC 65: Global War	June 9, 2007	1	3:44	Farmington, New Mexico, United States	

== See also ==
- List of male mixed martial artists
