= Rick Story =

American mixed martial arts fighter (born 1984)

- Born: August 28, 1984 (age 42); Tacoma, Washington, United States
- Other names: The Horror
- Height: 5 ft 10 in (178 cm)
- Weight: 170 lb (77 kg; 12 st 2 lb)
- Division: Welterweight
- Reach: 71 in (180 cm)
- Style: Wrestling
- Stance: Southpaw
- Fighting out of: Vancouver, Washington, United States
- Team: MMA Lab
- Wrestling: NAIA Wrestling
- Years active: 2007–2018

Mixed martial arts record
- Total: 31
- Wins: 21
- By knockout: 4
- By submission: 5
- By decision: 12
- Losses: 10
- By knockout: 2
- By submission: 1
- By decision: 7

Other information
- University: Southern Oregon University
- Mixed martial arts record from Sherdog

Rick Story (born August 28, 1984) is a retired American mixed martial artist. A professional from 2007 to 2018, he last competed for the Professional Fighters League, but is better known for his 19-fight tenure with the UFC.

== Background ==
Story was born in Tacoma, Washington, and, at the age of three, his parents divorced. Story grew up in Spanaway, Washington, with his grandmother and his older sister, Elizabeth. Story began wrestling when he was around 12 years old and also began watching UFC fights. Story attended Bethel High School in Spanaway, Washington where he was a standout in both wrestling and football. Story continued his wrestling career at Southern Oregon University, where he was a runner-up in the 2006 NAIA National Championships, and began learning submission grappling from a friend during his sophomore year. After graduating with a degree in health education, Story embarked on a career in mixed martial arts.

== Mixed martial arts career ==
=== Ultimate Fighting Championship ===
Story signed a four-fight deal with the UFC and made his promotional debut, losing to John Hathaway via unanimous decision on the UFC 99 card.

Story had his second UFC fight at UFC 103 after stepping in for Paul Daley against debuting Brian Foster. Story defeated Foster via arm-triangle choke submission at 1:09 of round two and earned Submission of the Night and Fight of the Night honors.

Story won his fight against Jesse Lennox at UFC Fight Night 20 held on January 11, 2010. The fight was a three-round war in which Story was given the unanimous decision win.

In January 2010, he was resigned to a new four-fight deal with the UFC. His first fight with the brand new contract was against Englishman, Nick Osipczak at UFC 112, the UFC's first trip to Abu Dhabi. Story won the fight via controversial split decision.

Story fought Dustin Hazelett on August 7, 2010, at UFC 117. After winning the first round, Story won via second-round TKO.

Story faced future title holder Johny Hendricks on December 4, 2010, at The Ultimate Fighter 12 Finale and won the fight via unanimous decision.

After his win over Hendricks, Story called out former number one contender, Thiago Alves. Alves accepted the fight, which took place on May 28, 2011, at UFC 130. Story outworked Alves with his grappling and ring control for the majority of the fight. By the 3rd round, Alves began to connect with Story repeatedly but it wasn't enough. Story won via unanimous decision.

Story was expected to face Nate Marquardt on June 26, 2011, at UFC on Versus 4, replacing an injured Anthony Johnson. Marquardt, however, pulled out of the fight the day of the weigh-ins and Story instead faced Charlie Brenneman. Story lost in a huge upset via unanimous decision.

Story lost to Martin Kampmann via split decision on November 19, 2011, at UFC 139. Dana White incorrectly reported at the post fight press conference that a judge's scores had been tabulated incorrectly and should have been announced as unanimous decision in favor of Kampmann. According to the California State Athletic Commission's website and confirmed by MMADecisions.com, judge Susan Thomas-Gitlin in fact scored the fight in favor of Story.

Story was expected to face Rich Attonito on June 22, 2012, at UFC on FX: Maynard vs. Guida. However, Attonito was forced out of the bout with an injury and replaced by Papy Abedi. Abedi himself was also forced out of the bout with an injury and replaced by promotional newcomer Brock Jardine. Story won the fight via unanimous decision.

Story faced Demian Maia on October 13, 2012, at UFC 153. He lost the bout via first round submission due to a neck crank, this was his first submission and stoppage loss in his career.

Story was expected to face Sean Pierson on March 16, 2013, at UFC 158. However, Pierson was forced out of the bout with an injury and replaced by Quinn Mulhern. Story defeated Mulhern in the first round via TKO after landing a flurry of punches.

Story faced Mike Pyle on May 25, 2013, at UFC 160, replacing an injured Gunnar Nelson. He lost the fight via controversial split decision despite controlling most of the action and dropping Pyle with punches in the first round.

Story faced Brian Ebersole on November 16, 2013, at UFC 167. He won the fight via unanimous decision.

Story faced The Ultimate Fighter 17 winner Kelvin Gastelum on March 15, 2014, at UFC 171. He lost the back-and-forth fight via split decision.

Story was expected to face John Howard at UFC Fight Night 45 on July 16, 2014. However, Howard was forced out of the bout due to injury and was replaced by returning veteran Leonardo Mafra. Story defeated Mafra via submission in the second round.

Story faced Gunnar Nelson on October 4, 2014, at UFC Fight Night 53. Despite suffering a fracture in his left tibia in the second round, he won the fight via split decision.

Story was expected to face Erick Silva on June 27, 2015, at UFC Fight Night 70. However, Silva was removed from the card on June 19, after visa issues restricted his entry to the United States. In turn, Story was removed from the card as well. The bout with Story was rescheduled and was expected to take place on August 23, 2015, at UFC Fight Night 74. Subsequently, Story pulled out of the bout on August 11 citing injury and was replaced by Neil Magny.

Story returned from an 18-month layoff to face Tarec Saffiedine on May 29, 2016, at UFC Fight Night 88. He won the fight by unanimous decision.

In the ultimate fight in UFC, Story faced Donald Cerrone on August 20, 2016, at UFC 202. He lost the fight by TKO in the second round.

=== Post-UFC career ===
On March 12, 2018, Story announced that he has signed a contract with Professional Fighters League albeit UFC had offered a contract extension.

On November 8, 2018, Story announced his retirement from professional competition.

== Personal life ==
Aside from being a professional fighter, Story is also a member of the National Guard.

== Championships and accomplishments ==
- Ultimate Fighting Championships
  - Submission of the Night (One time) vs. Brian Foster
  - Fight of the Night (One time) vs. Brian Foster
  - UFC.com Awards
    - 2009: Ranked #6 Submission of the Year vs. Brian Foster & Ranked #7 Fight of the Year vs. Brian Foster
    - 2010: Ranked #10 Fighter of the Year (Tied with Evan Dunham & Chris Leben)
    - 2011: Ranked #8 Upset of the Year vs. Thiago Alves
    - 2014: Ranked #3 Upset of the Year vs. Gunnar Nelson

== Mixed martial arts record ==
Professional record breakdown
31 matches	21 wins	10 losses
By knockout	4	2
By submission	5	1
By decision	12	7

Res.	Record	Opponent	Method	Event	Date	Round	Time	Location	Notes
Loss	21–10	Handesson Ferreira	TKO (arm injury)	PFL 10	October 20, 2018	2	1:15	Washington, D.C., United States	2018 PFL Welterweight Quarterfinal bout.
Win	21–9	Carlton Minus	Technical Submission (rear-naked choke)	PFL 6	August 16, 2018	2	2:55	Atlantic City, New Jersey, United States	
Win	20–9	Yuri Villefort	Decision (unanimous)	PFL 3	July 5, 2018	3	5:00	Washington, D.C., United States	
Loss	19–9	Donald Cerrone	TKO (knee and punches)	UFC 202	August 20, 2016	2	2:02	Las Vegas, Nevada, United States	
Win	19–8	Tarec Saffiedine	Decision (unanimous)	UFC Fight Night: Almeida vs. Garbrandt	May 29, 2016	3	5:00	Las Vegas, Nevada, United States	
Win	18–8	Gunnar Nelson	Decision (split)	UFC Fight Night: Nelson vs. Story	October 4, 2014	5	5:00	Stockholm, Sweden	
Win	17–8	Leonardo Mafra	Submission (arm-triangle choke)	UFC Fight Night: Cowboy vs. Miller	July 16, 2014	2	2:12	Atlantic City, New Jersey, United States	
Loss	16–8	Kelvin Gastelum	Decision (split)	UFC 171	March 15, 2014	3	5:00	Dallas, Texas, United States	
Win	16–7	Brian Ebersole	Decision (unanimous)	UFC 167	November 16, 2013	3	5:00	Las Vegas, Nevada, United States	
Loss	15–7	Mike Pyle	Decision (split)	UFC 160	May 25, 2013	3	5:00	Las Vegas, Nevada, United States	
Win	15–6	Quinn Mulhern	TKO (punches)	UFC 158	March 16, 2013	1	3:05	Montreal, Quebec, Canada	
Loss	14–6	Demian Maia	Submission (neck crank)	UFC 153	October 13, 2012	1	2:30	Rio de Janeiro, Brazil	
Win	14–5	Brock Jardine	Decision (unanimous)	UFC on FX: Maynard vs. Guida	June 22, 2012	3	5:00	Atlantic City, New Jersey, United States	
Loss	13–5	Martin Kampmann	Decision (split)	UFC 139	November 19, 2011	3	5:00	San Jose, California, United States	
Loss	13–4	Charlie Brenneman	Decision (unanimous)	UFC Live: Kongo vs. Barry	June 26, 2011	3	5:00	Pittsburgh, Pennsylvania, United States	
Win	13–3	Thiago Alves	Decision (unanimous)	UFC 130	May 28, 2011	3	5:00	Las Vegas, Nevada, United States	
Win	12–3	Johny Hendricks	Decision (unanimous)	The Ultimate Fighter: Team GSP vs. Team Koscheck Finale	December 4, 2010	3	5:00	Las Vegas, Nevada, United States	
Win	11–3	Dustin Hazelett	TKO (punches)	UFC 117	August 7, 2010	2	1:15	Oakland, California, United States	
Win	10–3	Nick Osipczak	Decision (split)	UFC 112	April 10, 2010	3	5:00	Abu Dhabi, United Arab Emirates	
Win	9–3	Jesse Lennox	Decision (split)	UFC Fight Night: Maynard vs. Diaz	January 11, 2010	3	5:00	Fairfax, Virginia, United States	
Win	8–3	Brian Foster	Submission (arm-triangle choke)	UFC 103	September 19, 2009	2	1:09	Dallas, Texas, United States	Submission of the Night. Fight of the Night.
Loss	7–3	John Hathaway	Decision (unanimous)	UFC 99	June 13, 2009	3	5:00	Cologne, Germany	
Win	7–2	Brandon Melendez	Submission (rear-naked choke)	EWC: Vancouver	September 6, 2008	1	2:17	Ridgefield, Washington, United States	Defended the Elite Warriors Welterweight Championship.
Win	6–2	Wesley Welch	KO (punch)	Carnage at the Creek 3	August 22, 2008	1	N/A	Shelton, Washington, United States	
Win	5–2	Jake Ellenberger	Decision (unanimous)	SportFight 23	June 20, 2008	3	5:00	Portland, Oregon, United States	
Win	4–2	Ryan Healy	Decision (unanimous)	EWC: May Massacre	May 10, 2008	5	5:00	Salem, Oregon, United States	Won the Elite Warriors Welterweight Championship.
Win	3–2	James Dodge	Submission (rear-naked choke)	EWC: Welterweight War	February 23, 2008	1	3:37	Salem, Oregon, United States	
Win	2–2	Jake Paul	TKO (punches)	EWC: Capital Invasion	January 12, 2008	2	1:03	Salem, Oregon, United States	
Loss	1–2	Nathan Coy	Decision (unanimous)	SportFight 21: Seasons Beatings	December 22, 2007	3	5:00	Portland, Oregon, United States	
Win	1–1	Julio Paulino	Decision (unanimous)	AFC 41: Thankful Throwdowns	November 15, 2007	3	5:00	Anchorage, Alaska, United States	
Loss	0–1	Mario Miranda	Decision (unanimous)	Conquest of the Cage	November 6, 2007	3	5:00	Airway Heights, Washington, United States	

== See also ==
- List of current UFC fighters
- List of male mixed martial artists
