= Tony Hervey =

American mixed martial arts fighter

- Born: December 19, 1985 (age 40); United States
- Other names: Lionheart
- Height: 5 ft 8 in (1.73 m)
- Weight: 154.3 lb (70.0 kg; 11.02 st)
- Division: Featherweight; Lightweight; Welterweight
- Team: Stealth Squad
- Years active: 2006-2014

Mixed martial arts record
- Total: 37
- Wins: 17
- By knockout: 11
- By submission: 5
- By decision: 1
- Losses: 20
- By knockout: 1
- By submission: 7
- By decision: 12

Other information
- Mixed martial arts record from Sherdog

Tony Hervey (born December 19, 1985) is an American mixed martial artist who last competed in the Lightweight division. A professional competitor from 2006 until 2015, he competed for Bellator, Shooto, and King of the Cage, where he was the Welterweight Champion and Lightweight Champion.

== Championships and accomplishments ==
- King of the Cage
  - KOTC Welterweight Championship (One time)
  - KOTC Lightweight Championship (One time)

== Mixed martial arts record ==
Professional record breakdown
36 matches	16 wins	20 losses
By knockout	11	1
By submission	4	7
By decision	1	12

Res.	Record	Opponent	Method	Event	Date	Round	Time	Location	Notes
Loss	17-20	Khaos Williams	Decision (unanimous)	TWC: Brooks vs. Robinson	March 9, 2019	3	5:00	Lansing, Michigan, United States	Catchweight (165 lbs) bout. For TWC Catchweight Championship.
Loss	17-19	Jason Fischer	Decision (unanimous)	Bellator 124	September 12, 2014	3	5:00	Plymouth Township, Michigan, United States	
Loss	17-18	Jesse Gross	Decision (unanimous)	PFS: Pro Fighting Series 3	June 14, 2014	3	5:00	Sarnia, Ontario, Canada	
Loss	17-17	Colin Fletcher	Decision (split)	BAMMA 15: Thompson vs. Selmani	April 5, 2014	3	5:00	London, England, United Kingdom	
Win	17-16	Curtis Demarce	Decision (split)	KOTC: Out Cold	November 15, 2013	3	5:00	Cold Lake, Alberta, Canada	Catchweight (160 lbs) bout.
Loss	16-16	Jake Murphy	Decision (Unanimous)	GWC: The British Invasion: U.S. vs. U.K.	June 29, 2013	3	5:00	Kansas City, Missouri, United States	
Loss	16-15	Frank Caraballo	Submission (Guillotine Choke)	NAAFS: Caged Vengeance 13	March 30, 2013	1	2:42	Canton, Ohio, United States	Catchweight (150 lbs) bout.
Loss	16-14	Alexander Sarnavskiy	Decision (Unanimous)	Bellator LXXXIII	November 30, 2012	3	5:00	Atlantic City, New Jersey, United States	
Win	16-13	Jorge Britto	TKO (Doctor Stoppage)	SFS 6: Score Fighting Series 6	October 19, 2012	2	5:00	Sarnia, Ontario, Canada	
Win	15-13	Buddy Clinton	Submission (triangle choke)	KOTC: Aerial Assault 1	June 30, 2012	4	1:50	Thackerville, Oklahoma, United States	Won the vacant KOTC Light Welterweight Championship.
Loss	14-13	Mike Ricci	Decision (unanimous)	Ringside MMA 13: The Saint Patrick's Day Beatdown	March 17, 2012	3	5:00	Montreal, Quebec, Canada	
Loss	14-12	Jesse Ronson	Submission (rear-naked choke)	SFS 3: Meltdown in the Valley	December 3, 2011	2	4:25	Sarnia, Ontario, Canada	
Win	14-11	Brad Cardinal	TKO (punches)	Freedom Fight: For Honor and Pride	September 10, 2011	3	3:45	Sudbury, Ontario, Canada	
Win	13-11	Mike Campbell	KO (punch)	CES MMA: Cage of Pain	April 8, 2011	1	3:31	Lincoln, Rhode Island, United States	
Loss	12-11	Taiki Tsuchiya	TKO (punches)	Shooto: Shootor's Legacy 1	January 10, 2011	1	4:25	Tokyo, Japan	
Loss	12-10	Shane Campbell	Decision (split)	Awada Combat Club: ERA Fight Night	December 3, 2010	3	5:00	Edmonton, Alberta, Canada	
Loss	12-9	Jarrod Card	Submission	Xtreme Fighting Championships	October 10, 2010	N/A	/A	Florida, United States	
Loss	12-8	Yukinari Tamura	Submission (rear-naked choke)	KOTC: Sniper	August 5, 2010	1	2:25	San Bernardino, California, United States	
Win	12-7	Scott Bickerstaff	KO (punches)	KOTC: Underground 56	May 8, 2010	1	0:17	Sault Ste. Marie, Michigan, United States	
Loss	11-7	Kotetsu Boku	Decision (unanimous)	KOTC: Toryumon	January 30, 2010	3	5:00	Okinawa, Japan, United States	
Loss	11-6	David Shepherd	Submission (rear-naked choke)	KOTC: Title Defense	December 12, 2009	1	4:19	Sault Ste. Marie, Michigan, United States	Lost the KOTC Lightweight Championship.
Loss	11-5	Takanori Gomi	Decision (unanimous)	VTJ 2009: Vale Tudo Japan 2009	October 30, 2009	5	5:00	Tokyo, Japan	
Win	11-4	Victor Valenzuela	TKO (doctor stoppage)	KOTC: Superstars	August 13, 2009	2	1:32	Highland, California, United States	Won the vacant KOTC Lightweight Championship.
Win	10-4	Alberto Crane	KO (punches)	KOTC: Militia	June 11, 2009	1	0:12	San Bernardino, California, United States	
Win	9-4	Mike Roberts	TKO (punches)	KOTC: Fusion	January 17, 2009	2	1:19	Mount Pleasant, Michigan, United States	
Loss	8-4	Angelo Sanchez	Decision (split)	KOTC: Goodfellas	December 6, 2008	5	5:00	Albuquerque, New Mexico, United States	For the interim KOTC Bantamweight Championship.
Win	8-3	Gabe Rivas	TKO (doctor stoppage)	KOTC: Misconduct	October 16, 2008	1	0:00	Highland, California, United States	
Win	7-3	Josh Cate	TKO (punches)	XFC 5: Return of the Giant	September 13, 2008	1	0:27	Tampa, Florida, United States	
Loss	6-3	Frank Santore	Decision (unanimous)	XFC 3: Rage in the Cage	March 2, 2008	3	5:00	Tampa, Florida, United States	
Loss	6-2	Pat Curran	Submission (rear-naked choke)	XFO 22: Rising Star	February 23, 2008	1	1:24	Lakemoor, Illinois, United States	
Win	6-1	Derek Griffin	KO (punch)	Combat: USA	February 22, 2008	1	0:40	Green Bay, Wisconsin, United States	
Win	5-1	Ryan Stock	Submission (guillotine choke)	EFC 6: Evolution FC 6	January 19, 2008	1	N/A	West Bend, Wisconsin, United States	
Win	4-1	Nick Pugh	TKO (punches)	TFC: Toledo Fight Challenge	December 22, 2007	1	4:04	Toledo, Ohio, United States	
Win	3-1	Bryan Goldsby	Submission (choke)	XFF 6: Xtreme Freestyle Fighting 6	December 1, 2007	1	3:08	Dalton, Georgia, United States	
Loss	2-1	Billy Vaughan	Submission (heel hook)	FF: Capitol Punishment	September 29, 2007	1	0:59	Columbus, Ohio, United States	
Win	2-0	Richard Bear	Submission (armlock)	FF: 14	May 12, 2007	N/A	N/A	Columbus, Ohio, United States	
Win	1-0	Diego Paisedes	Submission (rear-naked choke)	IMMT: Iowa Meanest Man Tournament	January 11, 2007	1	0:32	Iowa, United States	

=== Mixed martial arts amateur record ===
Amateur record breakdown		
5 matches	3 wins	2 losses
By knockout	1	0
By submission	2	1
By decision	0	1

Res.	Record	Opponent	Method	Event	Date	Round	Time	Location	Notes
Loss	3-2	Grant Hoppel	Submission (rear-naked choke)	NLF 9: Next Level Fighting 9	July 21, 2007	2	2:52	Steubenville, Ohio, United States	
Win	3-1	John Myers	Submission (choke)	FightFest: Black and Blues Tour	July 6, 2007	2	1:53	Cleveland, Ohio, United States	
Win	2-1	Richard Bear	Submission (armbar)	FF 12: Fightfest 12	May 12, 2007	1	2:50	Canton, Ohio, United States	
Loss	1-1	Cal Ferry	Decision (unanimous)	XFO: Xtreme Fighting Organization 15	March 24, 2007	3	3:00	Lakemoor, Illinois, United States	
Win	1-0	Steven Grguric	TKO (referee stoppage)	ICE 23: International Combat Events	September 30, 2006	2	1:08		

== See also ==
- List of male mixed martial artists
