= Yuri Villefort =

Brazilian mixed martial arts fighter

- Born: March 23, 1991 (age 35); Brasília, DF, Brazil
- Height: 6 ft 0 in (1.83 m)
- Weight: 170 lb (77 kg; 12 st)
- Division: Welterweight (2012–2013, 2015–present); Lightweight (2009–2010, 2014–2015)
- Reach: 73 in (185 cm)
- Fighting out of: Boca Raton, Florida, United States
- Team: Blackzilians; American Top Team (formerly)
- Years active: 2009–present

Mixed martial arts record
- Total: 18
- Wins: 11
- By knockout: 4
- By submission: 4
- By decision: 3
- Losses: 7
- By submission: 2
- By decision: 5

Other information
- Notable relatives: Danillo Villefort, brother
- Mixed martial arts record from Sherdog

Yuri Villefort (born March 23, 1991) is a Brazilian mixed martial artist who competes in the Welterweight division. A professional competitor since 2009, he has competed for the UFC and Strikeforce. He is the younger brother of fellow mixed martial artist Danillo Villefort.

== Mixed martial arts career ==
=== Early career ===
Yuri started his career in 2009 and fought mainly for Florida-based promotions. With a record of six victories and no losses, Villefort signed with Strikeforce.

=== Strikeforce ===
Villefort was expected to face Travis Bush on July 24, 2011 at Strikeforce Challengers 16: Fodor vs. Terry. However, he was removed from the event due to training injuries.

Villefort made his debut against Quinn Mulhern on May 19, 2012 at Strikeforce: Barnett vs. Cormier. He lost via split decision (30–27 Mulhern, 29–28 Villefort, 29–28 Mulhern).

Villefort was expected to face Nah-Shon Burrell on September 29, 2012 at Strikeforce: Melendez vs. Healy. However, the event was cancelled due to headliner and lightweight champion Gilbert Melendez getting injured.

=== Ultimate Fighting Championship ===
Villefort made his promotional debut against fellow Strikeforce import Nah-Shon Burrell on February 23, 2013 at UFC 157. He lost the back-and-forth fight via unanimous decision (30–27, 29–28, 29–28).

Villefort faced Sean Spencer on September 4, 2013 at UFC Fight Night: Teixeira vs. Bader. He lost the fight via split decision (30–27 Spencer, 29–28 Villefort, 29–28 Spencer). and was subsequently released from the promotion.

=== Post-UFC career ===
Villefort returned to MMA after a one-year hiatus, and faced Chris Bennett at Fight Time 21 on November 7, 2014. Despite being the considerable favorite coming into the fight, Villefort would lose the fight via guillotine choke, just forty-five seconds into the first round.

== Mixed martial arts record ==
Professional record breakdown
| 20 matches | 12 wins | 8 losses |
| By knockout | 5 | 1 |
| By submission | 4 | 2 |
| By decision | 3 | 5 |

| Res. | Record | Opponent | Method | Event | Date | Round | Time | Location | Notes |
|---|---|---|---|---|---|---|---|---|---|
| Loss | 12–8 | Michael Graves | TKO (punches) | Titan FC 59 | February 28, 2020 | 4 | 4:40 | Fort Lauderdale, Florida, United States | For the Titan FC Welterweight Championship. |
| Win | 12–7 | Joey Munoz | KO (punch) | 247 FC: Brawl In The Burgh 2 | November 16, 2019 | 1 | 1:44 | Canonsburg, Pennsylvania, United States | |
| Loss | 11–7 | João Zeferino | Submission (rear-naked choke) | PFL 6 (2018) | August 16, 2018 | 3 | 1:10 | Atlantic City, New Jersey, United States | |
| Loss | 11–6 | Rick Story | Decision (unanimous) | PFL 3 (2018) | July 5, 2018 | 3 | 5:00 | Washington, D.C., United States | |
| Win | 11–5 | Victor Moreno | Submission (guillotine choke) | Victory FC 59 | December 16, 2017 | 1 | 0:29 | Omaha, Nebraska, United States | Defended the Victory FC Welterweight Championship. |
| Win | 10–5 | Kassius Holdorf | Decision (unanimous) | Victory FC 56 | April 14, 2017 | 5 | 5:00 | Omaha, Nebraska, United States | Won the Victory FC Welterweight Championship. |
| Win | 9–5 | Cody Carrillo | Decision (unanimous) | Victory FC 50 | May 21, 2016 | 3 | 5:00 | Topeka, Kansas, United States | |
| Win | 8–5 | Kenneth Glenn | KO (knee) | Victory FC 47 | January 29, 2016 | 1 | 4:15 | Omaha, Nebraska, United States | Catchweight bout (163 lbs). |
| Win | 7–5 | Doug Jenkins | KO (punches) | Gladiator Cage Fights | November 21, 2015 | 1 | 1:40 | St. Charles, Missouri, United States | Catchweight bout (160 lbs). |
| Loss | 6–5 | Adam Townsend | Decision (unanimous) | RFA vs. Legacy FC 1: Pantoja vs. Page | May 8, 2015 | 3 | 5:00 | Robinsonville, Mississippi, United States | |
| Loss | 6–4 | Chris Bennett | Submission (guillotine choke) | Fight Time 21: Soares vs. Barroso | November 7, 2014 | 1 | 0:45 | Fort Lauderdale, Florida, United States | Return to Lightweight. |
| Loss | 6–3 | Sean Spencer | Decision (split) | UFC Fight Night: Teixeira vs. Bader | September 4, 2013 | 3 | 5:00 | Belo Horizonte, Minas Gerais, Brazil | |
| Loss | 6–2 | Nah-Shon Burrell | Decision (unanimous) | UFC 157 | February 23, 2013 | 3 | 5:00 | Anaheim, California, United States | Catchweight bout (175.8 lb); Burrell missed weight. |
| Loss | 6–1 | Quinn Mulhern | Decision (split) | Strikeforce: Barnett vs. Cormier | May 19, 2012 | 3 | 5:00 | San Jose, California, United States | Welterweight debut. |
| Win | 6–0 | Jason Fitzhugh | Submission (armbar) | Action Fight League: Rock-N-Rumble 3 | July 4, 2010 | 2 | 2:04 | Hollywood, Florida, United States | |
| Win | 5–0 | Julio César Andrade | Decision (unanimous) | Bitetti Combat 6 | February 25, 2010 | 3 | 5:00 | Brasília, Distrito Federal, Brazil | |
| Win | 4–0 | Joshua Lee | TKO (punches) | Unconquered 1: November Reign | November 20, 2009 | 2 | 4:08 | Coral Gables, Florida, United States | |
| Win | 3–0 | Frank Carrillo | KO (punch) | G-Force Fights: Bad Blood 2 | September 26, 2009 | 1 | 4:03 | Coral Gables, Florida, United States | |
| Win | 2–0 | Bounmy Somchay | Submission (guillotine choke) | XFN: Da Matta vs. Thorne | May 14, 2009 | 1 | 2:22 | Fort Lauderdale, Florida, United States | |
| Win | 1–0 | Lindon Mitchell | Submission (heel hook) | RW 3: Florida | April 24, 2009 | 1 | 0:51 | Fort Lauderdale, Florida, United States | |
