= Strikeforce: Barnett vs. Cormier =

Strikeforce mixed martial arts event in 2012

- The poster for Strikeforce: Barnett vs. Cormier
- Promotion: Strikeforce
- Date: May 19, 2012
- Venue: HP Pavilion
- City: San Jose, California, United States

Event chronology
Strikeforce: Tate vs. Rousey	Strikeforce: Barnett vs. Cormier	Strikeforce: Rockhold vs. Kennedy

Strikeforce: Barnett vs. Cormier was a mixed martial arts event held by Strikeforce. It took place on May 19, 2012, at the HP Pavilion in San Jose, California.

== Background ==
Nate Marquardt was expected to fight Tyron Woodley at this event for the vacant Strikeforce Welterweight Championship. It instead took place at Strikeforce: Rockhold vs. Kennedy, where Marquardt won the title by fourth-round knockout.

== Results ==
Main card (Showtime)
Weight class				Method	Round	Time	Notes
Heavyweight	Daniel Cormier	def.	Josh Barnett	Decision (unanimous) (49–46, 50–45, 50–45)	5	5:00	(Note: The Strikeforce Heavyweight Grand Prix final.)
Lightweight	Gilbert Melendez (c)	def.	Josh Thomson	Decision (split) (47–48, 48–47, 48–47)	5	5:00	(Note: For the Strikeforce Lightweight Championship.)
Light Heavyweight	Rafael Cavalcante	vs.	Mike Kyle	No Contest (overturned)	1	0:33	(Note: Originally a submission (guillotine choke) win for Cavalcante; result overturned to a no contest after Cavalcante tested positive for stanozolol.)
Welterweight	Chris Spång	def.	Nah-Shon Burrell	TKO (knees)	1	3:25
Preliminary card (Showtime Extreme)
Lightweight	Isaac Vallie-Flagg	def.	Gesias Cavalcante	Decision (split) (29–28, 29–28, 28–29)	3	5:00
Lightweight	Bobby Green	def.	James Terry	Decision (split) (28–29, 29–28, 29–28)	3	5:00
Welterweight	Quinn Mulhern	def.	Yuri Villefort	Decision (split) (30–27, 28–29, 29–28)	3	5:00
Light Heavyweight	Gian Villante	def.	Derrick Mehmen	Decision (unanimous) (29–28, 30–27, 30–27)	3	5:00
Light Heavyweight	Guto Inocente	def.	Virgil Zwicker	Decision (unanimous) (29–28, 29–28, 30–27)	3	5:00

== Heavyweight Grand Prix Bracket ==
Quarter-finals
(Russia) Fedor Emelianenko	2
(Brazil) Antônio Silva	TKO
(Netherlands) Alistair Overeem	UD
(Brazil) Fabrício Werdum	3
(Belarus) Andrei Arlovski	1
(Russia) Sergei Kharitonov	KO
(United States) Josh Barnett	SUB
(United States) Brett Rogers	2

Semi-finals
(Brazil) Antônio Silva	1
(United States) Daniel Cormier**	KO
(Russia) Sergei Kharitonov	1
(United States) Josh Barnett	SUB

Final
(United States) Daniel Cormier	UD
(United States) Josh Barnett	5

** = Replacement
