= Nah-Shon Burrell =

American mixed martial arts fighter

- Born: Nah-Shon Burrell; February 5, 1990 (age 36); Philadelphia, Pennsylvania, United States
- Other names: The Rock-n-Rolla
- Height: 5 ft 11 in (1.80 m)
- Weight: 185 lb (84 kg; 13.2 st)
- Division: Middleweight; Welterweight
- Reach: 71 in (180 cm)
- Stance: Orthodox
- Fighting out of: Philadelphia, Pennsylvania, United States
- Team: Fight Firm
- Rank: Blue belt in Brazilian jiu-jitsu
- Years active: 2010–present

Mixed martial arts record
- Total: 33
- Wins: 19
- By knockout: 12
- By submission: 1
- By decision: 6
- Losses: 13
- By knockout: 2
- By submission: 2
- By decision: 9
- No contests: 1

Other information
- Mixed martial arts record from Sherdog

Nah-Shon Burrell (born February 5, 1990) is an American professional mixed martial artist currently competing in the Middleweight division. A professional competitor since 2010, Burrell has competed for Bellator MMA, the Ultimate Fighting Championship (UFC), Strikeforce, Absolute Championship Berkut and the Cage Fury Fighting Championships.

== Background ==
Burrell is from the Overbrook neighborhood of Philadelphia, Pennsylvania, and attended Overbrook High School where he competed in football as well as track and field, and was talented. Burrell often got into fights and ultimately did not stick with sports as he admits that he "did not like taking orders". However, after Burrell began watching UFC fights, he became motivated to become a mixed martial arts fighter himself.

== Mixed martial arts career ==
=== Early career ===
After a 3–2 amateur career, Burrell began his professional MMA career in 2010. He fought only for middle Atlantic states organizations. With a MMA record of 5–1, he signed with Strikeforce.

=== Strikeforce ===
Burrell made his debut on May 20, 2011, at Strikeforce: Overeem vs. Werdum against Joe Ray. He won via unanimous decision.

Burrell faced Lukasz Les on August 12, 2011, at Strikeforce Challengers: Gurgel vs. Duarte. He won via TKO in the second round.

Burrell faced James Terry on January 7, 2012, at Strikeforce: Rockhold vs. Jardine. He won via split decision.

Burrell was expected to face Bobby Voelker on May 19, 2012, at Strikeforce: Barnett vs. Cormier, however Voelker had to withdraw due to injury and was replaced by Chris Spang. He lost via TKO in the first round.

Burrell was expected to face Yuri Villefort on September 29, 2012, at Strikeforce: Melendez vs. Healy. However, the event was cancelled due to headliner and lightweight champion Gilbert Melendez getting injured.

=== Ultimate Fighting Championship ===
Burrell made his promotional debut against fellow Strikeforce import Yuri Villefort on February 23, 2013, at UFC 157. He won the back-and-forth fight via unanimous decision (30-27, 29-28, 29-28).

Burrell faced Stephen Thompson on May 25, 2013, at UFC 160. He lost the fight by unanimous decision (29-28, 30-27, 29-28) and was subsequently released from the promotion.

=== Bellator MMA ===
Burrell was expected to make his promotional debut against Dante Rivera on November 15, 2013, at Bellator 108. However, Rivera was removed from the card due to undisclosed reasons and Burrell instead faced Jesus Martinez. He won the fight via unanimous decision (30-27, 30-27, 29-28).

Burrell faced Andrey Koreshkov in the quarterfinal match of Bellator Season Ten Welterweight Tournament on March 14, 2014, at Bellator 112. He was defeated early in the first round via TKO at 0:41.

Burrell faced Michael Page at Bellator 128 on October 10, 2014, and lost the bout via unanimous decision (30-27, 30-27, 30-27).

=== Absolute Championship Berkut ===
Burrell was scheduled to make his promotional debut at ACB 72. However, the bout was rescheduled to ACB 75 on November 25, 2017, for unknown reasons. In turn, Isaev's entry to Germany was denied and the bout was cancelled. Eventually, Burrell faced Beslan Isaev on December 23, 2017, at ACB 77. He lost the fight by majority decision.

Burrell faced Albert Tumenov on December 23, 2017, at ACB 80. He lost the fight by unanimous decision.

In his third fight in ACB, Burrell headlined ACB 84 against Arbi Agujev on April 7, 2018. He lost the fight via unanimous decision.

=== Return to regional circuit ===
After the three-fight stint in ACB, Burrell faced Ron Stallings at CES MMA 52 on August 17, 2018. He lost the fight via unanimous decision.

Burrell was expected to face Gabriel Checco at Final Fight Championship 38 on June 20, 2019. However, the bout was cancelled for unknown reasons.

Burrell was then scheduled to face Danny Davis Jr. at CFFC 85 on September 18, 2020. However, the bout was scrapped for unknown reasons and Burrell faced Ryot Waller at CFFC 84 on September 17, 2020. He won the fight via second-round submission.

Burrell next faced Moses Murrietta at CFFC 90 on December 17, 2020. He won the fight via first-round knockout.

Burrell faced Khetag Pliev at CFFC 99 on August 14, 2021. He won the fight via third-round knockout.

Burrell faced Kyle Stewart at CFFC 102 on October 30, 2021. He won the fight via unanimous decision.

Burrell faced Ikram Aliskerov at Eagle FC 46 on March 11, 2022. At weigh ins, Aliskerov missed weight for his bout. Aliskerov weighed in at 186.2 pounds, 0.2 pounds over the middleweight non-title limit. The bout proceeded at catchweight and he was fined a percentage of his purse, which went to Burrell. He lost the bout via unanimous decision.

== Mixed martial arts record ==
Professional record breakdown
33 matches	19 wins	13 losses
By knockout	12	2
By submission	1	2
By decision	6	9
No contests	1	

Res.	Record	Opponent	Method	Event	Date	Round	Time	Location	Notes
Loss	19–13 (1)	Justin Sumter	Submission (rear-naked choke)	CES MMA 78	August 2, 2024	1	1:15	Ledyard, Connecticut, United States	
Loss	19–12 (1)	Ikram Aliskerov	Decision (unanimous)	Eagle FC 46	March 11, 2022	3	5:00	Miami, Florida, United States	Catchweight (186.2 lb) bout; Aliskerov missed weight.
Win	19–11 (1)	Kyle Stewart	Decision (unanimous)	Cage Fury FC 102	October 30, 2021	3	5:00	Philadelphia, Pennsylvania, United States	
Win	18–11 (1)	Khetag Pliev	KO (punch)	Cage Fury FC 99	August 14, 2021	3	1:56	Tunica, Mississippi, United States	Welterweight bout.
Win	17–11 (1)	Moses Murrietta	KO (punches)	Cage Fury FC 90	December 17, 2020	1	3:00	Lancaster, Pennsylvania, United States	
Win	16–11 (1)	Ryot Waller	Submission (rear-naked choke)	Cage Fury FC 84	September 17, 2020	2	2:00	Tunica, Mississippi, United States	
Loss	15–11 (1)	Ron Stallings	Decision (unanimous)	CES MMA 52	August 17, 2018	3	5:00	Lincoln, Rhode Island, United States	Return to Middleweight.
Loss	15–10 (1)	Arbi Agujev	Decision (unanimous)	ACB 84	April 7, 2018	3	5:00	Bratislava, Slovakia	
Loss	15–9 (1)	Albert Tumenov	Decision (unanimous)	ACB 80	February 16, 2018	3	5:00	Krasnodar, Russia	
Loss	15–8 (1)	Beslan Isaev	Decision (majority)	ACB 77	December 23, 2017	3	5:00	Moscow, Russia	
Win	15–7 (1)	Micah Terrill	TKO (punches)	Xtreme Caged Combat 28	June 23, 2017	1	1:16	Philadelphia, Pennsylvania, United States	Return to Welterweight.
Loss	14–7 (1)	Tim Williams	Decision (unanimous)	Cage Fury FC 59	July 9, 2016	3	5:00	Philadelphia, Pennsylvania, United States	
Win	14–6 (1)	Dustin Long	TKO (punches)	Global Proving Ground 24	May 14, 2016	1	4:40	Voorhees, New Jersey, United States	Return to Middleweight. Won the vacant GPG Middleweight Championship.
Win	13–6 (1)	Chris Curtis	Decision (split)	CES MMA 34	April 1, 2016	5	5:00	Mashantucket, Connecticut, United States	Non-title bout; Burrell missed weight (176 lb).
Win	12–6 (1)	Ryan Dickson	TKO (punches)	Global Proving Ground 22	November 21, 2015	2	0:29	Voorhees, New Jersey, United States	
Loss	11–6 (1)	Lyman Good	Submission (rear-naked choke)	Cage Fury FC 48	May 9, 2015	1	3:47	Atlantic City, New Jersey, United States	Return to Welterweight. For the Cage Fury FC Welterweight Championship.
Win	11–5 (1)	Ryan Hodge	TKO (punches)	New England Fights: Fight Night 16	February 7, 2015	1	3:16	Lewiston, Maine, United States	Middleweight debut.
Loss	10–5 (1)	Michael Page	Decision (unanimous)	Bellator 128	October 10, 2014	3	5:00	Thackerville, Oklahoma, United States	
Loss	10–4 (1)	Andrey Koreshkov	KO (knee and punches)	Bellator 112	March 14, 2014	1	0:41	Hammond, Indiana, United States	Bellator Season 10 Welterweight Tournament Quarterfinal.
Win	10–3 (1)	Jesus Martinez	Decision (unanimous)	Bellator 108	November 15, 2013	3	5:00	Atlantic City, New Jersey, United States	Catchweight (180 lb) bout.
NC	9–3 (1)	Mike Wade	NC (overturned)	Richmond Rumble MMA 1	September 28, 2013	3	5:00	Richmond, Virginia, United States	Originally a split decision win for Burrell; overturned after he tested positive for banned substance.
Loss	9–3	Stephen Thompson	Decision (unanimous)	UFC 160	May 25, 2013	3	5:00	Las Vegas, Nevada, United States	Catchweight (172 lb) bout; Burrell missed weight.
Win	9–2	Yuri Villefort	Decision (unanimous)	UFC 157	February 23, 2013	3	5:00	Anaheim, California, United States	Catchweight bout (175.8 lb); Burrell missed weight.
Loss	8–2	Chris Spang	TKO (knees and punches)	Strikeforce: Barnett vs. Cormier	May 19, 2012	1	3:25	San Jose, California, United States	
Win	8–1	James Terry	Decision (split)	Strikeforce: Rockhold vs. Jardine	January 7, 2012	3	5:00	Las Vegas, Nevada, United States	Catchweight (172 lb) bout; Burrell missed weight.
Win	7–1	Lukasz Les	TKO (leg kick and punches)	Strikeforce Challengers: Gurgel vs. Duarte	August 12, 2011	2	2:09	Las Vegas, Nevada, United States	
Win	6–1	Joe Ray	Decision (unanimous)	Strikeforce: Overeem vs. Werdum	June 18, 2011	3	5:00	Dallas, Texas, United States	Catchweight (180 lb) bout.
Win	5–1	Daryl Harris	KO (knee)	Cage Fury FC 8	May 20, 2011	2	1:32	Atlantic City, New Jersey, United States	
Win	4–1	Craig Thieme	TKO (punches)	Cage Fury FC 6	February 5, 2011	3	3:34	Atlantic City, New Jersey, United States	
Win	3–1	Robert Corpora	TKO (punches)	Asylum Fight League 32	November 5, 2010	2	3:34	Philadelphia, Pennsylvania, United States	
Loss	2–1	Chris Curtis	Decision (unanimous)	Xtreme Caged Combat: Hostile Intent	October 1, 2010	3	5:00	Feasterville-Trevose, Pennsylvania, United States	
Win	2–0	Juan Garcia	TKO (punches)	Xtreme Caged Combat: Onslaught	July 16, 2010	1	4:24	Feasterville-Trevose, Pennsylvania, United States	
Win	1–0	Brad Pole	TKO (punches)	Jake the Snake Promotions: Cage Time 2	June 19, 2010	1	3:28	Ocean City, Maryland, United States	Welterweight debut.

== See also ==
- List of Bellator MMA alumni
