= UFC 160 =

UFC mixed martial arts event in 2013

UFC 160: Velasquez vs. Bigfoot 2
- The poster for UFC 160: Velasquez vs. Bigfoot 2
- Promotion: Ultimate Fighting Championship
- Date: May 25, 2013
- Venue: MGM Grand Garden Arena
- City: Las Vegas, Nevada
- Attendance: 13,880
- Total gate: $2.942 million
- Buyrate: 380,000

Event chronology
UFC on FX: Belfort vs. Rockhold	UFC 160: Velasquez vs. Bigfoot 2	UFC on Fuel TV: Nogueira vs. Werdum

UFC 160: Velasquez vs. Bigfoot 2 was a mixed martial arts event held on May 25, 2013, at the MGM Grand Garden Arena in Las Vegas, Nevada.

== Background ==
The main event was a rematch between former UFC Heavyweight Champion Cain Velasquez and Antônio Silva. In their first encounter at UFC 146 a year earlier, Velasquez defeated Silva via first-round TKO.

Alistair Overeem was expected to face Junior dos Santos at the event. However, in early March, Overeem pulled out of the bout citing a leg injury. It was initially announced that the bout would be rescheduled for a future event, later in the summer of this year. Then, on March 9 it was announced that Dos Santos would remain on the card and face Mark Hunt.

Ryan Bader was expected to face Glover Teixeira at the event but withdrew from the bout due to injury in March. He was replaced by James Te Huna

Amir Sadollah was expected to face Stephen Thompson at the event. However, Sadollah pulled out of the bout citing an injury and was replaced by Nah-Shon Burrell.

Gunnar Nelson was expected to face Mike Pyle at the event. However, Nelson pulled out of the bout citing an injury and was replaced by Rick Story.

Dana White announced at the UFC on Fox 7 post-fight press conference that he expects that the winner of the Gray Maynard/T. J. Grant fight would get a UFC Lightweight title shot against Benson Henderson.

At the weigh-ins, Khabib Nurmagomedov came in heavy weighing in at 158.5 lb. Nurmagomedov was given two hours to cut to the lightweight maximum of 156 pounds, but he elected instead to surrender a percentage of his fight purse to his opponent Abel Trujillo and the bout was contested at a catchweight.

== Results ==
Main card
Weight class				Method	Round	Time	Notes
Heavyweight	Cain Velasquez (c)	def.	Antônio Silva	TKO (punches)	1	1:21	(Note: For the UFC Heavyweight Championship.)
Heavyweight	Junior dos Santos	def.	Mark Hunt	KO (spinning hook kick)	3	4:18
Light Heavyweight	Glover Teixeira	def.	James Te Huna	Submission (guillotine choke)	1	2:38
Lightweight	T. J. Grant	def.	Gray Maynard	KO (knee & punches)	1	2:07
Lightweight	Donald Cerrone	def.	K. J. Noons	Decision (unanimous) (30–27, 30–27, 30–26)	3	5:00
Preliminary card (FX)
Welterweight	Mike Pyle	def.	Rick Story	Decision (split) (28–29, 29–28, 29–28)	3	5:00
Featherweight	Dennis Bermudez	def.	Max Holloway	Decision (split) (28–29, 29–28, 29–28)	3	5:00
Welterweight	Robert Whittaker	def.	Colton Smith	TKO (punches)	3	0:41
Catchweight (158.5 lb)	Khabib Nurmagomedov	def.	Abel Trujillo	Decision (unanimous) (30–27, 30–27, 30–27)	3	5:00
Preliminary card (Facebook)
Welterweight	Stephen Thompson	def.	Nah-Shon Burrell	Decision (unanimous) (29–28, 30–27, 29–28)	3	5:00
Bantamweight	George Roop	def.	Brian Bowles	TKO (punches)	2	1:43
Featherweight	Jeremy Stephens	def.	Estevan Payan	Decision (unanimous) (30–26, 30–26, 30–27)	3	5:00

== Bonus awards ==
The following fighters received $50,000 bonuses.

- Fight of the Night: Junior Dos Santos vs. Mark Hunt
- Knockout of the Night: T. J. Grant
- Submission of the Night: Glover Teixeira

== Reported payout ==
The following is the reported payout to the fighters as reported to the Nevada State Athletic Commission. It does not include sponsor money and also does not include the UFC's traditional "fight night" bonuses.

- Cain Velasquez: $400,000 (no win bonus) def. Antônio Silva: $75,000
- Junior dos Santos: $240,000 (includes $120,000 win bonus) def. Mark Hunt: $160,000
- Glover Teixeira: $48,000 (includes $24,000 win bonus) def. James Te-Huna: $30,000
- T. J. Grant: $50,000 (includes $25,000 win bonus) def. Gray Maynard: $45,000
- Donald Cerrone: $82,000 (includes $41,000 win bonus) def. K. J. Noons: $41,000
- Mike Pyle: $84,000 (includes $42,000 win bonus) def. Rick Story: $27,000
- Dennis Bermudez: $28,000 (includes $14,000 win bonus) def. Max Holloway: $14,000
- Robert Whittaker: $30,000 (includes $15,000 win bonus) def. Colton Smith: $15,000
- Khabib Nurmagomedov: $28,000 (includes $14,000 win bonus) def. Abel Trujillo: $8,000 ^
- Stephen Thompson: $16,000 (includes $8,000 win bonus) def. Nah-Shon Burrell: $9,000
- George Roop: $26,000 (includes $13,000 win bonus ) def. Brian Bowles: $19,000
- Jeremy Stephens: $48,000 (includes $24,000 win bonus) def. Estevan Payan: $10,000

^ Khabib Nurmagomedov was reportedly fined 20 percent of his purse for failing to make the required weight for his fight. The Nevada State Athletic Commission's initial report did not include information on the penalty.

== See also ==
- List of UFC events
- 2013 in UFC
