= 2010 in King of the Cage =

Mixed martial arts events

Information
- First date: January 30, 2010
- Last date: December 9, 2010

Events
- Total events: 40

Fights
- Total fights: 431
- Title fights: 21

Chronology
| 2009 in KOTC | 2010 in King of the Cage | 2011 in KOTC |

The year 2010 is the 12th year in the history of King of the Cage, a mixed martial arts promotion based in the United States. In 2010 King of the Cage held 40 events, KOTC: Toryumon.

== Title fights ==
Title fights in 2010
| Weight class | | | | Method | Round | Time | Event | Notes |
|---|---|---|---|---|---|---|---|---|
| Junior Flyweight | Mamoru Yamaguchi | def. | Frank Baca | Submission (Rear-Naked Choke) | 2 | 1:54 | KOTC: Toryumon | (Note: For the King of the Cage Junior Flyweight Championship.) |
| Bantamweight | Donald Sanchez (ic) | def. | Victor Valenzuela | TKO (Punches) | 4 | 4:05 | KOTC: Vengeance | (Note: For the King of the Cage Bantamweight Championship.) |
| Heavyweight | Tony Lopez (c) | def. | Tyler East | Submission (Triangle Choke) | 1 | 4:54 | KOTC: Vengeance | (Note: For the King of the Cage Heavyweight Championship.) |
| Flyweight | Abel Cullum (c) | def. | Joe Coca | Submission (Kimura) | 1 | 2:09 | KOTC: Vengeance | (Note: For the King of the Cage Flyweight Championship.) |
| Cruiserweight | Tony Bonello | def. | Mike Bourke | Submission (Triangle Choke) | 1 | 0:54 | KOTC: Vengeance | (Note: For the King of the Cage Cruiserweight Championship.) |
| Junior Welterweight | Bobby Green | def. | Ricky Legere Jr. (c) | TKO (Punches) | 1 | 4:27 | KOTC: Arrival | (Note: For The King of the Cage Junior Welterweight Championship.) |
| Heavyweight | Tony Johnson | def. | Tony Lopez (c) | Decision (Unanimous) | 5 | 5:00 | KOTC: Legacy | (Note: For the King of the Cage Heavyweight Championship.) |
| Welterweight | Quinn Mulhern | def. | Koffi Adzitso | Submission (Rear-Naked Choke) | 2 | 1:36 | KOTC: Legacy | (Note: For The King of the Cage Welterweight Championship.) |
| Lightweight | Dom O'Grady | def. | David Shepherd (c) | Submission (Armbar) | 2 | 4:18 | KOTC: Bad Boys II | (Note: For the King of the Cage Lightweight Championship.) |
| Middleweight | Brandon Hunt | def. | Brad Burrick (c) | KO (Punch) | 2 | 0:59 | KOTC: Bad Boys II | (Note: For The King of the Cage Middleweight Championship.) |
| Light Heavyweight | Mike Kyle | def. | Tony Lopez (c) | Decision (Split) | 5 | 5:00 | KOTC: Honor | (Note: For the King of the Cage Light Heavyweight Championship.) |
| Flyweight | Abel Cullum (c) | def. | Joshua Montoya | Submission (Rear-Naked Choke) | 1 | 1:38 | KOTC: Honor | (Note: For the King of the Cage Flyweight Championship.) |
| Bantamweight | Donald Sanchez (ic) | def. | Angelo Sanchez (c) | Decision (Split) | 5 | 5:00 | KOTC: Honor | (Note: For the King of the Cage Bantamweight Championship.) |
| Super Heavyweight | Neil Cooke (c) | def. | Mike Guidry | Submission (Kimura) | 1 | 3:42 | KOTC: Tropical Storm | (Note: For the King of the Cage Super Heavyweight Championship.) |
| Heavyweight | Daniel Cormier | def. | Tony Johnson (c) | Submission (Rear-Naked Choke) | 1 | 2:27 | KOTC: Imminent Danger | (Note: For the King of the Cage Heavyweight Championship.) |
| Junior Welterweight | Bobby Green (c) | def. | Daron Cruickshank | Submission (Guillotine Choke) | 2 | 2:39 | KOTC: Imminent Danger | (Note: For The King of the Cage Junior Welterweight Championship.) |
| Welterweight | Quinn Mulhern (c) | def. | Levi Stout | Submission (Rear-Naked Choke) | 1 | 2:52 | KOTC: Imminent Danger | (Note: For The King of the Cage Welterweight Championship.) |
| Middleweight | Brandon Hunt (c) | def. | Angelo Popofski | TKO (Punches) | 2 | 3:13 | KOTC: Civil War 2 | (Note: For The King of the Cage Middleweight Championship.) |
| Flyweight | Jimmie Rivera | def. | Abel Cullum (c) | Decision (Split) | 5 | 5:00 | KOTC: No Mercy | (Note: For the King of the Cage Flyweight Championship.) |
| Bantamweight | Donald Sanchez (c) | def. | Pat McGreal | Submission (Rear-Naked Choke) | 1 | 2:27 | KOTC: No Mercy | (Note: For the King of the Cage Bantamweight Championship.) |
| Junior Welterweight | Tim Means | def. | Bobby Green (c) | TKO (Retirement) | 2 | 5:00 | KOTC: Inferno | (Note: For The King of the Cage Junior Welterweight Championship.) |

== Events list ==
| # | Event Title | Date | Arena | Location |
|---|---|---|---|---|
| 210 | KOTC: Steel | December 9, 2010 | San Manuel Casino | San Bernardino, California |
| 209 | KOTC: Zero Tolerance | November 27, 2010 | Inn of the Mountain Gods Resort and Casino | Mescalero, New Mexico |
| 208 | KOTC: Platinum | November 25, 2010 | Durban International Convention Centre | Durban, South Africa |
| 207 | KOTC: Infusion | November 13, 2010 | Eastside Cannery Casino and Hotel | Las Vegas, Nevada |
| 206 | KOTC: Underground 64 | November 6, 2010 | Kewadin Casino | Sault Ste Marie, Michigan |
| 205 | KOTC: Mainstream | October 29, 2010 | Jackpot Junction Casino | Morton, Minnesota |
| 204 | KOTC: Free Fall | October 23, 2010 | Northern Lights Casino | Walker, Minnesota |
| 203 | KOTC: High Profile | October 9, 2010 | Lake of the Torches Casino | Lac Du Flambeau, Wisconsin |
| 202 | KOTC: Inferno | October 7, 2010 | San Manuel Casino | Highland, California |
| 201 | KOTC: Underground 63 | October 2, 2010 | Avi Casino | Laughlin, Nevada |
| 200 | KOTC: Underground 62 | September 18, 2010 | Ute Mountain Casino | Cortez, Colorado |
| 199 | KOTC: No Mercy | September 17, 2010 | MGM Grand Casino at Foxwoods | Mashantucket, Connecticut |
| 198 | KOTC: Civil War 2 | September 11, 2010 | Royal Oak Music Theatre | Royal Oak, Michigan |
| 197 | KOTC: Underground 61 | August 28, 2010 | Leelanau Sands Casino | Peshawbestown, Michigan |
| 196 | KOTC: Underground 60 | August 14, 2010 | Kewadin Casino | Sault Ste Marie, Michigan |
| 195 | KOTC: Imminent Danger | August 13, 2010 | Inn of the Mountain Gods Casino | Mescalero, New Mexico |
| 194 | KOTC: Sniper | August 5, 2010 | San Manuel Casino | San Bernardino, California |
| 193 | KOTC: Underground 59 | July 31, 2010 | Storm Stadium | Lake Elsinore, California |
| 192 | KOTC: Chain Reaction | July 17, 2010 | Storm Stadium | Lake Elsinore, California |
| 191 | KOTC: Tropical Storm | July 10, 2010 | Storm Stadium | Lake Elsinore, California |
| 190 | KOTC: Underground 58 | June 5, 2010 | Quinault Gods Resort and Casino | Ocean Shores, Washington |
| 189 | KOTC: Adrenaline | June 4, 2010 | Buffalo Thunder Resort and Casino | Santa Fe, New Mexico |
| 188 | KOTC: Underground 57 | May 22, 2010 | Ute Recreation Center | Towaoc, Colorado |
| 187 | KOTC: Honor | May 14, 2010 | Inn of the Mountain Gods Resort and Casino | Mescalero, New Mexico |
| 186 | KOTC: Excessive Damage | May 13, 2010 | San Manuel Casino | Highland, California |
| 185 | KOTC: Underground 56 | May 8, 2010 | Kewadin Casino | Sault Ste. Marie, Michigan |
| 184 | KOTC: Underground 55 | April 30, 2010 | Jackpot Junction Casino Hotel | Morton, Minnesota |
| 183 | KOTC: Turbulence 2 | April 24, 2010 | Lake of the Torches Casino | Lac du Flambeau, Wisconsin |
| 182 | KOTC: Underground 54 | April 17, 2010 | Leelanau Sands Casino | Peshawbestown, Michigan |
| 181 | KOTC: Bad Boys II | April 16, 2010 | Cobo Arena | Detroit, Michigan |
| 180 | KOTC: Legacy | March 26, 2010 | Silver Legacy Resort Casino | Reno, Nevada |
| 179 | KOTC: Upper Cut | March 13, 2010 | Avi Resort and Casino | Laughlin, Nevada |
| 178 | KOTC: Native Warriors | March 6, 2010 | Buffalo Thunder Resort and Casino | Santa Fe, New Mexico |
| 177 | KOTC: Ice Age | March 5, 2010 | Shooting Star Casino | Mahnomen, Minnesota |
| 176 | KOTC: Starlight | February 27, 2010 | Ute Mountain Casino | Cortez, Colorado |
| 175 | KOTC: Arrival | February 25, 2010 | San Manuel Casino | Highland, California |
| 174 | KOTC: Vengeance | February 12, 2010 | Inn of the Mountain Gods Resort and Casino | Mescalero, New Mexico |
| 173 | KOTC: Offensive Strategy | February 6, 2010 | Northern Lights Casino | Walker, Minnesota |
| 172 | KOTC: Toryumon | January 30, 2010 | Okinawa Convention Center | Okinawa, Japan |

== KOTC: Toryumon ==
KOTC: Toryumon was an event held on January 30, 2010, at the Okinawa Convention Center in Okinawa, Japan.

=== Results ===
Main Card
| Weight class | | | | Method | Round | Time | Notes |
|---|---|---|---|---|---|---|---|
| Junior Flyweight | Mamoru Yamaguchi | def. | Frank Baca | Submission (Rear-Naked Choke) | 2 | 1:54 | (Note: For the King of the Cage Junior Flyweight Championship.) |
| | Kotetsu Boku | def. | Tony Hervey | Decision (Unanimous) | 3 | 5:00 |
| | Toby Imada | def. | Daisuke Hanazawa | KO (Punch) | 2 | 0:29 |
| | Roxanne Modafferi | def. | Molly Helsel | Submission (Rear-Naked Choke) | 2 | 3:18 |
| | Tatsuya So | def. | Shigeki Matsuda | TKO (Punches) | 2 | 3:48 |
| | Shungo Oyama | def. | Mike Wimmer | Submission (Heel Hook) | 1 | 1:07 |
| | Koji Kanechika | def. | Jerry Vrbanovic | Decision (Unanimous) | 3 | 3:00 |
| | Jerry Nelson | def. | Shinsho Anzai | Decision | 3 | 3:00 |
| | Zachary Hayden | def. | Black Dragon | Submission (Rear-Naked Choke) | 1 | 0:29 |
| | Tomohiro Adaniya | def. | Toyoshi Miyagi | Decision (Unanimous) | 3 | 3:00 |
| | Shinya Kumazawa | def. | Steve Hecht | Submission (Armbar) | 1 | 2:14 |
| | Tsuyoshi Tamaki | def. | Bryon Schnell | Submission (Rear-Naked Choke) | 3 | 2:28 |
| | Donald Shaw | def. | Riku Inafuku | TKO (Punches) | 1 | 2:26 |

== KOTC: Offensive Strategy ==
KOTC: Offensive Strategy was an event held on February 6, 2010, at the Northern Lights Casino in Walker, Minnesota.

=== Results ===
Main Card
| Weight class | | | | Method | Round | Time | Notes |
|---|---|---|---|---|---|---|---|
| | Derek Smith | def. | Bryan Barberena | Submission (Armbar) | 3 | 2:55 |
| | Reese Hernandez | def. | Jed Anderson | Submission | 3 | 1:43 |
| | Jeff Doyle | def. | Dean Lamb | Submission (Armbar) | 1 | 2:25 |
| | R.T. Hicks | def. | Kyle Fletcher | Submission (Rear-Naked Choke) | 1 | 2:13 |
| | Brandon Rossbach | def. | Jim Peterson | TKO (Punches) | 1 | 1:41 |
| | Kevin Barnerena | def. | Joe Pawlenty | Decision (Unanimous) | 3 | 3:00 |
| | Teslah Bastian | def. | Carolyn Biskup | Submission (Rear-Naked Choke) | 1 | 2:27 |
| | Carl Deaton | def. | Eli Finn | Submission (Rear-Naked Choke) | 1 | 2:40 |
| | Sam Schad | def. | Chris Davis | TKO (Punches) | 2 | 0:24 |
| | Jared Averbeck | def. | Dan Curch | Submission (Rear-Naked Choke) | 2 | 2:29 |
| | Kody Barberena | def. | John Wolbeck | TKO (Punches) | 1 | 1:39 |
| | Allison Rall | def. | Judy Conaway | TKO (Punches) | 1 | 1:21 |

== KOTC: Vengeance ==
KOTC: Vengeance was an event held on February 12, 2010, at the Inn of the Mountain Gods Resort and Casino in Mescalero, New Mexico.

=== Results ===
Main Card
| Weight class | | | | Method | Round | Time | Notes |
|---|---|---|---|---|---|---|---|
| | Richard Villa | def. | Brad Nordquist | TKO (Punches) | 1 | 2:16 |
| | Eddie Armendariz | def. | Levi Price | TKO (Punches) | 2 | 3:21 |
| | Joey Lujan | def. | Javier Rubio | Submission (Rear-Naked Choke) | 1 | 2:47 |
| | Boy Morgan | def. | Joey Frank | TKO (Punches) | 1 | 0:32 |
| | Mike Kyle | vs. | Travis Wiuff | NC (Punch After the Bell) | 2 | 5:00 |
| Bantamweight | Donald Sanchez (ic) | def. | Victor Valenzuela | TKO (Punches) | 4 | 4:05 | (Note: For the King of the Cage Bantamweight Championship.) |
| Heavyweight | Tony Lopez (c) | def. | Tyler East | Submission (Triangle Choke) | 1 | 4:54 | (Note: For the King of the Cage Heavyweight Championship.) |
| Flyweight | Abel Cullum (c) | def. | Joe Coca | Submission (Kimura) | 1 | 2:09 | (Note: For the King of the Cage Flyweight Championship.) |
| | Quinn Mulhern | def. | Rich Clementi | TKO (Punches) | 2 | 3:09 |
| | James Flores | def. | Jeremiah Crosby | TKO (Punches) | 1 | 0:59 |
| Cruiserweight | Tony Bonello | def. | Mike Bourke | Submission (Triangle Choke) | 1 | 0:54 | (Note: For the King of the Cage Cruiserweight Championship.) |
| | Andrew Vasquez | def. | Brian Chavez | TKO (Punches) | 2 | 0:24 |

== KOTC: Arrival ==
KOTC: Arrival was an event held on February 25, 2010, at the San Manuel Casino in Highland, California.

=== Results ===
Main Card
| Weight class | | | | Method | Round | Time | Notes |
|---|---|---|---|---|---|---|---|
| Junior Welterweight | Bobby Green | def. | Ricky Legere Jr. (c) | TKO (Punches) | 1 | 4:27 | (Note: For The King of the Cage Junior Welterweight Championship.) |
| | Reuben Duran | def. | Ryan Diaz | KO (Punch) | 3 | 4:57 |
| | Waachiim Spiritwolf | vs. | Ismael Gonzalez | Draw | 1 | 4:00 |
| | Musa Toliver | def. | Mongkhon Wiwasuk | Decision (Unanimous) | 3 | 5:00 |
| | Dave Rivas | def. | Martin Bautista | Decision (Unanimous) | 3 | 5:00 |
| | Ron Keslar | def. | Jonathan Brandon | Submission (Rear-Naked Choke) | 2 | 0:34 |
| | David Gomez | def. | George Sanchez | Decision (Unanimous) | 3 | 3:00 |
| | Aaron Arana | def. | Chris Wolf | Submission (Armbar) | 1 | 0:47 |

== KOTC: Starlight ==
KOTC: Starlight was an event held on February 27, 2010, at the Ute Mountain Casino in Cortez, Colorado.

=== Results ===
Main Card
| Weight class | | | | Method | Round | Time | Notes |
|---|---|---|---|---|---|---|---|
| | Cris Leyva | def. | Steve Simmons | Decision (Split) | 3 | 5:00 |
| | Billy Colon | def. | Isaque Martinez | Submission (Guillotine Choke) | 2 | 0:40 |
| | Elsie Zwicker | def. | Alyx Hess | Submission (Guillotine Choke) | 1 | 4:05 |
| | Nathan Torrez | def. | Terry Taylor | Submission (Guillotine Choke) | 1 | 0:29 |
| | Jacob Clark | def. | Patrick Murphy | Submission (Triangle Choke) | 1 | 1:06 |
| | Isaiah Reyes | def. | Levi Howes | Submission (Triangle Choke) | 1 | 1:09 |
| | Daniel Armendariz | def. | Carlos Henri | KO (Punches) | 1 | 0:20 |
| | Anthony Sessions | def. | John Craycraft | Submission (Rear-Naked Choke) | 1 | 1:42 |
| | Kaan Clark | def. | Beto Torrez | Submission (Armbar) | 2 | 1:57 |
| | Grant Hobbs | def. | Nathan Orano | Submission (Rear-Naked Choke) | 1 | 1:25 |
| | Juan Munoz | def. | Greg Varela | Submission (Rear-Naked Choke) | 1 | 1:32 |

== KOTC: Ice Age ==
KOTC: Ice Age was an event held on March 5, 2010, at the Shooting Star Casino in Mahnomen, Minnesota.

=== Results ===
Main Card
| Weight class | | | | Method | Round | Time | Notes |
|---|---|---|---|---|---|---|---|
| | Pablo Garza | def. | Nate Bell | Submission (Punches) | 1 | 1:00 |
| | Marshall Martin | def. | Anthony Iverson | TKO (Punches) | 1 | 1:10 |
| | Isaiah Larson | def. | Miguel Cooley | TKO (Punches) | 1 | 1:25 |
| | Shane DeZee | def. | Ben Wicks | Submission (Rear-Naked Choke) | 1 | 0:28 |
| | Tony Sims | def. | Josh Shaffer | TKO (Punches) | 1 | 0:14 |
| | Mike Foster | def. | Jeff Doyle | TKO (Punches) | 1 | 0:24 |
| | Dean Lamb | def. | Mike Bannister | Submission (Rear-Naked Choke) | 1 | 0:53 |
| | Brian Heden | def. | Chris Clark | TKO (Punches) | 1 | 1:14 |
| | William Kassulker | def. | Dave Thorson | TKO (Punches) | 2 | 0:53 |
| | Eli Finn | def. | Tyrel Lavalle | TKO (Punches) | 1 | 1:17 |
| | Fernando Mylante | def. | Cory Wilson | Submission (Armbar) | 1 | 1:36 |
| | Sam Schad | def. | Joe Pawlenty | TKO (Punches) | 1 | 1:32 |

== KOTC: Native Warriors ==
KOTC: Native Warriors was an event held on March 6, 2010, at the Buffalo Thunder Resort and Casino in Santa Fe, New Mexico.

=== Results ===
Main Card
| Weight class | | | | Method | Round | Time | Notes |
|---|---|---|---|---|---|---|---|
| | Angelo Sanchez | def. | Richard Montano | TKO (Punches) | 2 | 4:20 |
| | Isaac Vallie-Flagg | def. | Robert Simmons | TKO (Punches) | 1 | 2:48 |
| | Quinn Mulhern | def. | Boy Morgan | TKO (Punches) | 1 | 1:10 |
| | Gerald Lovato | def. | Nick Buschman | KO (Knee) | 3 | 4:27 |
| | Joshua Montoya | def. | Alfredo Herrea | Submission (Kimura) | 1 | 1:43 |
| | Ryan Axtell | def. | Lafayette Barela | Submission (Rear-Naked Choke) | 1 | 1:11 |
| | Jeff Paulson | def. | Matt Knaub | Submission (Guillotine Choke) | 1 | 4:23 |
| | Frank Baca | def. | Jeremiah Castillo | Submission (Front Choke) | 1 | 2:16 |
| | Jeremy Oyenque | def. | Trey Solomon | TKO (Punches) | 1 | 1:48 |
| | Ruben Rivera | def. | Brendan Downing | Submission (Triangle Choke) | 1 | 2:04 |
| | Jeremiah Cullum | def. | Matt Alvarado | Submission (Armbar) | 1 | 0:26 |
| | David Perez | def. | Jeremy Montano | TKO (Punches) | 2 | 2:13 |
| | Anthony Griego | def. | Daniel Mullen | TKO (Punches) | 1 | 1:17 |

== KOTC: Upper Cut ==
KOTC: Upper Cut was an event held on March 13, 2010, at the Avi Resort and Casino in Laughlin, Nevada.

=== Results ===
Main Card
| Weight class | | | | Method | Round | Time | Notes |
|---|---|---|---|---|---|---|---|
| | Thomas Kenney | def. | Scotty Merrit | Submission (Arm-Triangle Choke) | 2 | 1:33 |
| | Mike Bourke | def. | Jason Squyer | TKO (Doctor Stoppage) | 1 | 0:42 |
| | Rich Campbell | def. | Zach Matthews | TKO (Punches) | 1 | 2:04 |
| | Tim Humphry | def. | Aijalon Pace | TKO (Punches) | 1 | 1:54 |
| | Bryan Barberena | def. | David Barnett | KO (Punches) | 1 | 2:25 |
| | Matt Muramoto | def. | Abisai Lopez | Decision (Unanimous) | 3 | 3:00 |
| | Cody Tracy | def. | John Wilson | TKO (Punches) | 1 | 2:30 |
| | David Shepherd | def. | George Halder | Submission (Rear-Naked Choke) | 1 | 4:03 |
| | Jose Portocarrero | def. | Robert Durham | Decision (Unanimous) | 3 | 3:00 |
| | Chris Floyd | def. | Sufyan Safwan | TKO (Retirement) | 1 | 3:00 |
| | Daron Cruickshank | def. | Raul Mandez | TKO (Punches) | 1 | 2:19 |
| | Randy Haskill | def. | Michael Sharpneck | Submission (Rear-Naked Choke) | 1 | 2:11 |
| | Josh Lewis | def. | Bakari McClain | Decision (Unanimous) | 3 | 3:00 |
| | Kevin Barberena | def. | Joe Abernathy | TKO (Punches) | 1 | 1:58 |
| | Kevin Sauer | def. | Nick Patterson | Submission (Rear-Naked Choke) | 1 | 1:29 |
| | Kody Barberena | def. | Kasey Roberts | TKO (Punches) | 1 | 2:08 |

== KOTC: Legacy ==
KOTC: Legacy was an event held on March 26, 2010, at the Silver Legacy Resort Casino in Reno, Nevada. This event also featured the debut of the former two-time UFC Bantamweight Champion T.J Dillashaw

=== Results ===
Main Card
| Weight class | | | | Method | Round | Time | Notes |
|---|---|---|---|---|---|---|---|
| | Patrick Prescott | def. | Mike Ortega | Submission (Rear-Naked Choke) | 1 | 3:54 |
| | T.J. Dillashaw | def. | Czar Sklavos | Decision (Unanimous) | 3 | 5:00 |
| | Mike Kyle | def. | Jon Murphy | TKO (Punches and Elbows) | 2 | 4:53 |
| | Dustin Akbari | def. | Jack Montgomery | KO (Punches) | 1 | 2:30 |
| Heavyweight | Tony Johnson | def. | Tony Lopez (c) | Decision (Unanimous) | 5 | 5:00 | (Note: For the King of the Cage Heavyweight Championship.) |
| | Jaime Jara | def. | Tim Means | Submission (Guillotine Choke) | 1 | 2:19 |
| | Nick Gaston | def. | Mike Guidry | Submission (Keylock) | 1 | 4:49 |
| Welterweight | Quinn Mulhern | def. | Koffi Adzitso | Submission (Rear-Naked Choke) | 2 | 1:36 | (Note: For The King of the Cage Welterweight Championship.) |

== KOTC: Bad Boys II ==
KOTC: Bad Boys II was an event held on April 16, 2010, at the Cobo Arena in Detroit, Michigan.

=== Results ===
Main Card
| Weight class | | | | Method | Round | Time | Notes |
|---|---|---|---|---|---|---|---|
| | Joe Doerksen | def. | Chad Herrick | Decision (Split) | 3 | 5:00 |
| Lightweight | Dom O'Grady | def. | David Shepherd (c) | Submission (Armbar) | 2 | 4:18 | (Note: For the King of the Cage Lightweight Championship.) |
| | Daron Cruickshank | def. | Jason Holmes | Decision (Split) | 3 | 5:00 |
| | Ben Lagman | def. | Angelo Popofski | TKO (Punches) | 1 | 2:58 |
| | Waylon Lowe | def. | Steve Berger | KO (Punches) | 1 | 2:18 |
| Middleweight | Brandon Hunt | def. | Brad Burrick (c) | KO (Punch) | 2 | 0:59 | (Note: For The King of the Cage Middleweight Championship.) |
| | Caleb Grummet | def. | Anthony Smith | TKO (Punches) | 1 | 0:36 |
| | Eric Moon | def. | Dominic Deshazor | TKO (Doctor Stoppage) | 1 | 0:12 |
| | Chuck Mady | def. | Demetrius Dean | Submission (Triangle Choke) | 1 | 1:38 |

== KOTC: Underground 54 ==
KOTC: Underground 54 was an event held on April 17, 2010, at the Leelanau Sands Casino in Peshawbestown, Michigan.

=== Results ===
Main Card
| Weight class | | | | Method | Round | Time | Notes |
|---|---|---|---|---|---|---|---|
| | Joe Galer | def. | Patrick Harman | Decision (Unanimous) | 3 | 3:00 |
| | Jason Fish | def. | Christos Piliafas | TKO (Punches) | 3 | 2:05 |
| | Tyler Francis | def. | Anthony Gott | Submission (Rear-Naked Choke) | 1 | 2:02 |
| | Joey Caudill | def. | Jacob Parks | TKO (Punches) | 2 | 0:45 |
| | Kris Boyd | def. | Jeremy Damarzo | Submission (Punches) | 2 | 0:51 |
| | Jamie Wahmhoff | def. | Cody Sehl | TKO (Punches) | 2 | 2:38 |
| | Labron Oldham | def. | James McQueen | Submission (Punches) | 1 | 1:17 |
| | Nate Darnell | def. | Joe Robinson | Submission (Rear-Naked Choke) | 1 | 1:26 |
| | Andrew Mifflin | def. | Kevin Stocknick | TKO (Punches) | 2 | 1:30 |
| | Danny Thomas | def. | Chris Cameron | Decision (Unanimous) | 3 | 3:00 |
| | Jake Thomas | def. | Andre Thomas | TKO (Punches) | 2 | 2:22 |
| | Eulocio Garza | def. | Joe Rogers | Decision (Unanimous) | 3 | 3:00 |

== KOTC: Turbulence 2 ==
KOTC: Turbulence 2 was an event held on April 24, 2010, at the Lake of the Torches Casino in Lac du Flambeau, Wisconsin.

=== Results ===
Main Card
| Weight class | | | | Method | Round | Time | Notes |
|---|---|---|---|---|---|---|---|
| | Terry Martin | def. | Ted Worthington | Decision (Unanimous) | 3 | 5:00 |
| | James Warfield | def. | Marshall Martin | Submission (Armbar) | 1 | 3:22 |
| | Clay French | def. | Sean Wilson | Submission (Rear-Naked Choke) | 1 | 3:39 |
| | Danny Downes | def. | Bruce Johnson | TKO (Punches) | 1 | 4:56 |
| | Kevin Statnick | def. | Raymond Spires | TKO (Punches) | 1 | 0:53 |
| | Mike Buckley | def. | David Chmielewski | Submission (Keylock) | 1 | 1:02 |
| | Johnathan Meins | def. | Shane Cadotte | Decision (Unanimous) | 3 | 3:00 |
| | Tim Riebe | def. | Tim Wylie | Decision (Unanimous) | 3 | 3:00 |
| | Adrian Burke | def. | Scott Fosbinder | TKO (Retirement) | 2 | 3:00 |
| | Josh Sterry | def. | Raymond Spires | Submission (Guillotine Choke) | 2 | 2:07 |

== KOTC: Underground 55 ==
KOTC: Underground 55 was an event held on April 30, 2010, at the Jackpot Junction Casino Hotel in Morton, Minnesota.

=== Results ===
Main Card
| Weight class | | | | Method | Round | Time | Notes |
|---|---|---|---|---|---|---|---|
| | Garrett Olson | def. | Jeremy Lang | TKO (Punches) | 2 | 1:17 |
| | Josh Janousek | def. | Justin Grizzard | Decision (Unanimous) | 3 | 3:00 |
| | Kent Nathe | def. | Nate Williams | Decision (Unanimous) | 3 | 3:00 |
| | Bobby Ferrier | def. | Kyle Fletcher | KO (Punches) | 1 | 0:17 |
| | Sam Schad | def. | Beau Penk | Decision (Unanimous) | 3 | 3:00 |
| | Mike Zimmer | def. | Jared Averbeck | TKO (Punches) | 2 | 2:03 |
| | Jarrod L'Heureux | def. | Nick Hubenette | TKO (Punches) | 2 | 2:07 |
| | Fernando Violante | def. | Tyler Reed | Submission (Triangle Choke) | 1 | 0:32 |
| | Jason Zimmer | def. | Tony Houn | Submission (Armbar) | 1 | 0:59 |
| | Joel Wales | def. | Charles Kelm | Decision (Unanimous) | 3 | 3:00 |
| | Brad Padgett | def. | Josh Schmidt | Submission (Armbar) | 2 | 1:06 |
| | Kyle Wood | def. | Brett Hodgen | Submission (Triangle Choke) | 2 | 1:16 |
| | Todd Brooks | def. | Zach Kellso | Decision (Unanimous) | 3 | 3:00 |

== KOTC: Underground 56 ==
KOTC: Underground 56 was an event held on May 8, 2010, at the Kewadin Casino in Sault Ste. Marie, Michigan.

=== Results ===
Main Card
| Weight class | | | | Method | Round | Time | Notes |
|---|---|---|---|---|---|---|---|
| | Jeff Elliot | def. | Roy Williams | Submission (Triangle Choke) | 1 | 2:47 |
| | Tony Hervey | def. | Scott Bickerstaff | KO (Punches) | 1 | 0:17 |
| | Daniel Langbeen | def. | Christopher Harris | TKO (Punches) | 2 | 1:51 |
| | Ray Lopez | def. | Merlin Johnson | Submission (Rear-Naked Choke) | 2 | 0:58 |
| | John Stump | def. | Roy Ormsbee | TKO (Punches) | 1 | 1:02 |
| | Kris Nash | def. | Brandon Killip | TKO (Punches) | 2 | 0:30 |
| | Trevor Manchester | def. | Arron Dorr | TKO (Punches) | 1 | 0:20 |
| | Nate Case | def. | William Frost | Submission (Guillotine Choke) | 1 | 0:45 |
| | Ray Gowlet | def. | Nate Darnell | TKO (Punches) | 1 | 2:13 |
| | Steve Bassett | def. | Tony Bradford | Submission (Arm-Triangle Choke) | 1 | 1:09 |
| | Rob Anargyros | def. | Andrew Mifflin | Submission (Punches) | 1 | 1:36 |
| | John Veltri | def. | Jake Endline | KO (Punches) | 1 | 0:27 |
| | John Truss | def. | Daryl Thompson | Decision (Unanimous) | 3 | 3:00 |

== KOTC: Excessive Damage ==
KOTC: Excessive Damage was an event held on May 13, 2010, at the San Manuel Casino in Highland, California.

=== Results ===
Main Card
| Weight class | | | | Method | Round | Time | Notes |
|---|---|---|---|---|---|---|---|
| | Adam Lynn | def. | Ricky Legere Jr. | Decision (Majority) | 3 | 5:00 |
| | Lazar Stojadinovic | def. | Dave Rivas | Decision (Split) | 3 | 5:00 |
| | Kana Hyatt | def. | Shad Smith | KO (Punches) | 1 | 0:38 |
| | Jonathan Brandon | def. | Sam Rosen | TKO (Punches) | 3 | 1:54 |
| | Rigo Oropeza | def. | Jared Lara | KO (Punches) | 1 | 0:36 |
| | A.J. Matthews | def. | David Gomez | Decision (Unanimous) | 3 | 3:00 |
| | Kevin Sauer | def. | Frank Pizzirulli | Decision (Unanimous) | 3 | 3:00 |

== KOTC: Honor ==
KOTC: Honor was an event held on May 14, 2010, at the Inn of the Mountain Gods Resort and Casino in Mescalero, New Mexico.

=== Results ===
Main Card
| Weight class | | | | Method | Round | Time | Notes |
|---|---|---|---|---|---|---|---|
| | Tim Means | def. | Cody Garlett | TKO (Punches) | 1 | 1:17 |
| | Donnie Martinez | def. | J.R. Sotelo | Submission (Rear-Naked Choke) | 2 | 2:05 |
| | Boy Morgan | def. | Ambrose Teasyatwho | TKO (Punches) | 1 | 1:22 |
| | Jeremiah Cullum | def. | Matt Lewis | Submission (Arm-Triangle Choke) | 1 | 1:45 |
| | James Flores | def. | Fernando Motley | TKO (Punches) | 1 | 2:17 |
| | DC Dupree | def. | Fabian Vasquez | Decision (Split) | 3 | 3:00 |
| | Tyler East | def. | Raphael Bergmann | KO (Punches) | 1 | 0:45 |
| Light Heavyweight | Mike Kyle | def. | Tony Lopez (c) | Decision (Split) | 5 | 5:00 | (Note: For the King of the Cage Light Heavyweight Championship.) |
| | Nick Gaston | def. | Darrill Schoonover | TKO (Doctor Stoppage) | 2 | 3:13 |
| Flyweight | Abel Cullum (c) | def. | Joshua Montoya | Submission (Rear-Naked Choke) | 1 | 1:38 | (Note: For the King of the Cage Flyweight Championship.) |
| | Quinn Mulhern | def. | Joey Gorczynski | Submission (Rear-Naked Choke) | 3 | 0:53 |
| Bantamweight | Donald Sanchez (ic) | def. | Angelo Sanchez (c) | Decision (Split) | 5 | 5:00 | (Note: For the King of the Cage Bantamweight Championship.) |
| | Sam Oropeza | def. | Koa Ramos | Submission (Guillotine Choke) | 1 | 0:50 |
| | Greg Varela | def. | Casey Saenz | Submission (Rear-Naked Choke) | 1 | 1:53 |

== KOTC: Underground 57 ==
KOTC: Underground 57 was an event held on May 22, 2010, at the Ute Recreation Center in Towaoc, Colorado.

=== Results ===
Main Card
| Weight class | | | | Method | Round | Time | Notes |
|---|---|---|---|---|---|---|---|
| | Rad Martinez | def. | Jacob Clark | Decision (Unanimous) | 3 | 5:00 |
| | Isaque Martinez | def. | Eric Saavedra | TKO (Punches) | 1 | 2:57 |
| | Elsie Zwicker | def. | Kyane Hampton | Decision (Split) | 3 | 5:00 |
| | Roy Babcock | def. | Oliver Parker | Decision (Unanimous) | 3 | 5:00 |
| | Guy Youell | def. | Carlos Henri | Submission (Rear-Naked Choke) | 1 | 2:42 |
| | Trevor Mellen | def. | Isaiah Reyes | Decision (Split) | 3 | 5:00 |
| | Marciano Wilson | def. | Ambrose Teasyatwho | Submission (Kimura) | 1 | 1:18 |
| | Grant Hobbs | def. | Jerry Taura | Submission (Rear-Naked Choke) | 2 | 0:36 |
| | Nathan Scott | def. | Kyle Howe | Submission (Punches) | 1 | 0:45 |
| | Randy Fender | def. | Jorge Lopez | Decision (Unanimous) | 3 | 3:00 |
| | Andrew Durrall | def. | Jordan McCourt | TKO (Punches) | 1 | 0:23 |
| | Esias Gordo | def. | Nathan Orano | Submission (Rear-Naked Choke) | 2 | 0:53 |

== KOTC: Adrenaline ==
KOTC: Adrenaline was an event held on June 4, 2010, at the Buffalo Thunder Resort and Casino in Santa Fe, New Mexico.

=== Results ===
Main Card
| Weight class | | | | Method | Round | Time | Notes |
|---|---|---|---|---|---|---|---|
| | Monica Lovato | def. | Alyx Hess | TKO (Punches) | 1 | 2:19 |
| | Angelo Sanchez | def. | Daniel Armendariz | Submission (Triangle Choke) | 2 | 1:47 |
| | Gerald Lovato | def. | Ambrose Teasyatwho | Submission (Armbar) | 1 | 0:59 |
| | Anthony Griego | def. | Keith Armijo | Submission (Rear-Naked Choke) | 2 | 2:50 |
| | Joshua Montoya | def. | Donnie Frye | Submission (Rear-Naked Choke) | 1 | 3:34 |
| | Turrell Galloway | def. | J.J. Sedillo | TKO (Punches) | 1 | 0:31 |
| | Martin Gonzales | def. | Eddie Armendariz | Submission (Rear-Naked Choke) | 1 | 3:08 |
| | Lafayette Barela | def. | Joe Salazar | Submission (Punches) | 1 | 0:46 |
| | Boy Morgan | def. | Kody Hess | KO (Punches) | 1 | 3:43 |
| | David Perez | def. | Josh Garcia | Submission (Rear-Naked Choke) | 1 | 2:38 |
| | Bernadette Vigil | def. | Karla Noriega | TKO (Punches) | 1 | 0:45 |
| | Trey Solomon | def. | Billy Moore | TKO (Punches) | 2 | 1:13 |
| | Eric Martinez | def. | Brett Vaughn | TKO (Punches) | 2 | 2:38 |
| | Tim Sosa | def. | Abraham Garcia | TKO (Punches) | 2 | 2:47 |
| | David Perez | def. | Jacob Ortega | Submission (Arm-Triangle Choke) | 1 | 1:16 |

== KOTC: Underground 58 ==
KOTC: Underground 58 was an event held on June 5, 2010, at the Quinault Gods Resort and Casino in Ocean Shores, Washington.

=== Results ===
Main Card
| Weight class | | | | Method | Round | Time | Notes |
|---|---|---|---|---|---|---|---|
| | Ben Morgan | def. | Bryan Jones | TKO (Punches) | 1 | 1:57 |
| | Jason Gonzales | def. | Rick Cummins | TKO (Punches) | 1 | 0:45 |
| | Quincy Spruill | def. | Jason Findley | Submission (Rear-Naked Choke) | 1 | 0:55 |
| | Hector Trujillo | def. | Randy O'Conner | TKO (Punches) | 3 | 0:41 |
| | Joey Guevara | def. | Dan Ashapa | KO (Punches) | 2 | 1:17 |
| | Rob Yeager | def. | Morgan Medina | Decision (Unanimous) | 3 | 3:00 |
| | Kyle Dimmitt | def. | Tony McCorkendale | TKO (Punches) | 1 | 1:11 |
| | Josh Hery | def. | Trace Meyer | Submission (Rear-Naked Choke) | 1 | 2:56 |
| | Antonio Sanchez | def. | Nick Dugan | Submission (Triangle Choke) | 1 | 1:20 |

== KOTC: Tropical Storm ==
KOTC: Tropical Storm was an event held on July 10, 2010, at the Storm Stadium in Lake Elsinore, California.

=== Results ===
Main Card
| Weight class | | | | Method | Round | Time | Notes |
|---|---|---|---|---|---|---|---|
| Super Heavyweight | Neil Cooke (c) | def. | Mike Guidry | Submission (Kimura) | 1 | 3:42 | (Note: For the King of the Cage Super Heavyweight Championship.) |
| | Richard Schiller | vs. | Corey Grant | Draw | 3 | 5:00 |
| | Ricky Legere Jr. | def. | Joe Lewis | Submission (Rear-Naked Choke) | 1 | 4:10 |
| | Demetrice Woods | def. | Paul Arras | TKO (Punches) | 1 | 2:23 |
| | Jonathan Brandon | def. | Daniel McWilliams | Submission (Guillotine Choke) | 1 | 0:51 |
| | Liron Wilson | def. | Mike Bourke | Submission (Rear-Naked Choke) | 1 | 1:14 |
| | John De La O | def. | Alex Rickards | Submission (Armbar) | 2 | 1:26 |
| | Nick Garcia | def. | Thomas Casarez | Decision (Unanimous) | 3 | 3:00 |
| | Brandon Anderson | def. | Sei Kato | Decision (Split) | 3 | 3:00 |
| | Abisai Lopez | def. | Anthony Cruz | Submission (Rear-Naked Choke) | 2 | 1:52 |

== KOTC: Chain Reaction ==
KOTC: Chain Reaction was an event held on July 17, 2010, at the Lake of the Torches Casino in Lac du Flambeau, Wisconsin.

=== Results ===
Main Card
| Weight class | | | | Method | Round | Time | Notes |
|---|---|---|---|---|---|---|---|
| | Sam Alvey | vs. | Paul Bradley | NC (Rainfall) | 0 | 0:00 |
| | Ryan Farhat | def. | Floyd Hodges | Decision (Unanimous) | 3 | 5:00 |
| | Bobby Reardanz | def. | Jay Ellis | Submission (Rear-Naked Choke) | 1 | 2:56 |
| | Andrew Trace | def. | Tyler Hellenbrand | Decision (Split) | 3 | 5:00 |
| | Kevin Barthman | def. | Dan O'Dell | KO (Punches) | 1 | 0:31 |
| | Derrick Kaul | def. | Mike Van Note | Submission (Rear-Naked Choke) | 3 | 2:58 |
| | Shane Cadotte | def. | Dale Bennett | Submission (Rear-Naked Choke) | 3 | 1:37 |
| | Shawn Cunningham | def. | Brian Utke | Submission (Rear-Naked Choke) | 1 | 2:38 |
| | Jordan Winski | def. | Terry Dahl | Submission (Armbar) | 1 | 2:16 |
| | Jason Allington | def. | Adrian Pierson | TKO (Punches) | 2 | 1:53 |
| | Chris Wilke | def. | Jeff Clark | Submission (Rear-Naked Choke) | 1 | 1:21 |

== KOTC: Underground 59 ==
KOTC: Underground 59 was an event held on July 31, 2010, at the Storm Stadium in Lake Elsinore, California.

=== Results ===
Main Card
| Weight class | | | | Method | Round | Time | Notes |
|---|---|---|---|---|---|---|---|
| | Josh Janousek | def. | Travis Mccullough | Decision (Unanimous) | 3 | 5:00 |
| | Tyler Klejeski | def. | Miguel Cooley | Decision (Unanimous) | 3 | 5:00 |
| | Fernando Violante | def. | Bruce Johnson | Submission (Armbar) | 1 | 0:24 |
| | Bruce Nelson | def. | Dean Lamb | TKO (Punches) | 2 | 2:14 |
| | Sean Shamrock | def. | Lucas Goulet | TKO (Punches) | 1 | 1:55 |
| | Kyle Jensen | def. | Chris Dyrdahl | Submission (Triangle Choke) | 1 | 2:52 |
| | Sam Cleveland | def. | John Wolbeck | TKO (Punches) | 1 | 0:41 |
| | Dan Church | def. | Chad Robbins | TKO (Punches) | 1 | 1:10 |
| | Kimo Lecount | def. | Charles Kelm | Submission (Guillotine Choke) | 1 | 2:45 |
| | Randy Kittelson | def. | Tyrel Lavalle | TKO (Punches) | 1 | 0:47 |
| | Eli Finn | def. | Jake Rasmussen | Submission (Guillotine Choke) | 1 | 0:39 |
| | Cory Wilson | def. | Shawn Bolt | Submission (Rear-Naked Choke) | 1 | 1:41 |

== KOTC: Sniper ==
KOTC: Sniper was an event held on August 5, 2010, at the San Manuel Casino in San Bernardino, California.

=== Results ===
Main Card
| Weight class | | | | Method | Round | Time | Notes |
|---|---|---|---|---|---|---|---|
| | Mamoru Yamaguchi | def. | Greg Guzman | TKO (Elbows) | 2 | 2:21 |
| | Reuben Duran | def. | Kana Hyatt | Submission (Guillotine Choke) | 1 | 2:03 |
| | Yukinari Tamura | def. | Tony Hervey | Submission (Rear-Naked Choke) | 1 | 2:25 |
| | Saad Awad | def. | Bryson Kamaka | TKO (Punches) | 1 | 0:21 |
| | Ricky Legere Jr. | def. | Koa Ramos | Submission (Heel Hook) | 1 | 1:47 |
| | Juan Rivas | def. | Shad Smith | TKO (Punches) | 1 | 1:47 |
| | Daniel Hernandez | def. | Kenny McCorkell | Submission (Rear-Naked Choke) | 1 | 0:47 |
| | David Gomez | def. | Scotty Merrit | TKO (Punches) | 3 | 1:40 |
| | Dominic Waters | def. | Frank Pizzirulli | TKO (Punches) | 2 | 0:49 |

== KOTC: Imminent Danger ==
KOTC: Imminent Danger was an event held on August 13, 2010, at the Inn of the Mountain Gods Casino in Mescalero, New Mexico.

=== Results ===
Main Card
| Weight class | | | | Method | Round | Time | Notes |
|---|---|---|---|---|---|---|---|
| | Javier Rubio | def. | Jarome Sierra | Submission (Guillotine Choke) | 1 | 1:26 |
| | Frank Baca | def. | Michael Chupa | Submission (Triangle Choke) | 1 | 1:40 |
| | J.R. Sotelo | def. | Boy Morgan | TKO (Punches) | 1 | 2:50 |
| Heavyweight | Daniel Cormier | def. | Tony Johnson (c) | Submission (Rear-Naked Choke) | 1 | 2:27 | (Note: For the King of the Cage Heavyweight Championship.) |
| Junior Welterweight | Bobby Green (c) | def. | Daron Cruickshank | Submission (Guillotine Choke) | 2 | 2:39 | (Note: For The King of the Cage Junior Welterweight Championship.) |
| Welterweight | Quinn Mulhern (c) | def. | Levi Stout | Submission (Rear-Naked Choke) | 1 | 2:52 | (Note: For The King of the Cage Welterweight Championship.) |
| | Tyler East | def. | Esteves Jones | TKO (Knees and Punches) | 1 | 0:42 |
| | Trevor Mellen | def. | Gerald Lovato | Decision (Unanimous) | 3 | 5:00 |
| | DC Dupree | vs. | Fabian Vasquez | Draw | 3 | 3:00 |
| | Jacob Ortega | def. | Casey Saenz | TKO (Punches) | 2 | 2:46 |
| | Grant Hobbs | def. | Jonathan Ortega | Submission (Rear-Naked Choke) | 1 | 1:11 |

== KOTC: Underground 60 ==
KOTC: Underground 60 was an event held on August 14, 2010, at the Kewadin Casino in Sault Ste Marie, Michigan.

=== Results ===
Main Card
| Weight class | | | | Method | Round | Time | Notes |
|---|---|---|---|---|---|---|---|
| | Chad Herrick | def. | Joshua Taibl | TKO (Punches) | 1 | 1:55 |
| | John Stump | def. | Jeremy Borowicz | Submission (Arm-Triangle Choke) | 1 | 1:13 |
| | Mitch Fryia | def. | Dean Haider | Submission | 1 | 1:51 |
| | Cory Van Buren | def. | Martin Cruzcamp | Submission (Armbar) | 1 | 1:18 |
| | Vyron Phillips | def. | Jesse Easterwood | TKO (Punches) | 1 | 1:22 |
| | Dustin Lee | def. | Trevor LeBlanc | Submission (Rear-Naked Choke) | 1 | 0:58 |
| | Jeff Sabins | def. | Jason Perrone | Decision (Unanimous) | 3 | 3:00 |
| | Derek Weaver | def. | Dennis Vance | Submission (Guillotine Choke) | 2 | 0:02 |
| | Mike Howard | def. | Jake Endline | Submission (Rear-Naked Choke) | 1 | 0:16 |
| | Jesse Jackson | def. | John Thieubault | TKO (Punches) | 3 | 1:06 |
| | John Truss | def. | Jay Defoy | Decision (Unanimous) | 3 | 3:00 |
| | Bruce Spencer | def. | Thomas Rzanca | Submission (Rear-Naked Choke) | 1 | 2:36 |

== KOTC: Underground 61 ==
KOTC: Underground 61 was an event held on August 28, 2010, at the Leelanau Sands Casino in Peshawbestown, Michigan.

=== Results ===
Main Card
| Weight class | | | | Method | Round | Time | Notes |
|---|---|---|---|---|---|---|---|
| | Christos Piliafas | def. | Javon Prewitt | TKO (Punches) | 1 | 1:29 |
| | Danny Thomas | def. | Anthony Smith | Submission (Rear-Naked Choke) | 2 | 2:00 |
| | Sean Wolly | def. | Adam Evans | Submission (Armbar) | 1 | 1:33 |
| | Alex Zockazila | def. | Jake Endline | TKO (Punches) | 1 | 0:44 |
| | Kris Boyd | def. | Dustin Lee | Submission (Punches) | 1 | 2:23 |
| | Justin Renolds | def. | Tyler Finch | Decision (Unanimous) | 3 | 3:00 |
| | Gabe Howard | def. | Matt Bertola | Submission (Guillotine Choke) | 1 | 0:58 |
| | Joe Beckwith | def. | Cody Wall | TKO (Punches) | 3 | 1:45 |
| | Steve Summerfield | def. | Darryl Daoust | Decision (Split) | 3 | 3:00 |
| | Mike Howard | def. | Jeff Sabins | Submission (Guillotine Choke) | 1 | 0:45 |
| | Jared Prusick | def. | Sean Saville | Submission (Punches) | 1 | 0:47 |

== KOTC: Civil War 2 ==
KOTC: Civil War 2 was an event held on September 11, 2010, at the Royal Oak Music Theatre in Royal Oak, Michigan.

=== Results ===
Main Card
| Weight class | | | | Method | Round | Time | Notes |
|---|---|---|---|---|---|---|---|
| Middleweight | Brandon Hunt (c) | def. | Angelo Popofski | TKO (Punches) | 2 | 3:13 | (Note: For The King of the Cage Middleweight Championship.) |
| | Dom O'Grady | def. | Gabe Rivas | Submission (Rear-Naked Choke) | 2 | 1:21 |
| | Sean Baker | def. | Chad Herrick | TKO (Punches) | 1 | 0:31 |
| | Mike Hernandez | def. | Daniel Langbeen | TKO (Punches) | 1 | 0:36 |
| | Victor Torres | def. | Roy Williams | TKO (Punches) | 1 | 2:39 |
| | Daron Cruickshank | def. | Anthony Smith | TKO (Punches) | 1 | 1:52 |
| | Eric Moon | def. | Mitch Filer | Submission (Guillotine Choke) | 1 | 0:59 |
| | Adam Kelso | def. | David Savere | Submission (Rear-Naked Choke) | 1 | 4:55 |
| | Damon Dyer | def. | Billy Ward | Decision (Unanimous) | 3 | 3:00 |

== KOTC: No Mercy ==
KOTC: No Mercy was an event held on September 17, 2010, at the MGM Grand Casino at Foxwoods in Mashantucket, Connecticut.

=== Results ===
Main Card
| Weight class | | | | Method | Round | Time | Notes |
|---|---|---|---|---|---|---|---|
| Flyweight | Jimmie Rivera | def. | Abel Cullum (c) | Decision (Split) | 5 | 5:00 | (Note: For the King of the Cage Flyweight Championship.) |
| | Myles Jury | def. | Sam Oropeza | Submission (Neck Crank) | 1 | 2:55 |
| Bantamweight | Donald Sanchez (c) | def. | Pat McGreal | Submission (Rear-Naked Choke) | 1 | 2:27 | (Note: For the King of the Cage Bantamweight Championship.) |
| | Jesus Martinez | def. | Chip Moraza-Pollard | Decision (Unanimous) | 3 | 5:00 |
| | Noah Weisman | def. | Sean Wilmot | Decision (Unanimous) | 3 | 5:00 |
| | Evan Parker | def. | Hector Pacheco | Decision (Unanimous) | 3 | 5:00 |

== KOTC: Underground 62 ==
KOTC: Underground 62 was an event held on September 18, 2010, at the Ute Mountain Casino in Cortez, Colorado.

=== Results ===
Main Card
| Weight class | | | | Method | Round | Time | Notes |
|---|---|---|---|---|---|---|---|
| | Isaque Martinez | def. | Ben Ashauer | Submission (Choke) | 1 | 1:49 |
| | Elsie Zwicker | def. | Brittany Howard | Decision (Unanimous) | 3 | 5:00 |
| | Roy Babcock | def. | Steve Hanna | Decision (Unanimous) | 3 | 5:00 |
| | Isaiah Reyes | def. | Erik Alegria | Submission (Guillotine Choke) | 2 | 0:55 |
| | Orlando Rodriguez | def. | Carlos Henri | TKO (Punches) | 1 | 0:38 |
| | Mike Valdez | def. | Grant Hobbs | Submission (Guillotine Choke) | 1 | 1:44 |
| | Joe Hammons | def. | Matt Cockrell | Submission (Triangle Choke) | 1 | 1:15 |
| | Colton Huskey | def. | Jordan Williams | Submission (Rear-Naked Choke) | 2 | 2:42 |
| | Zach Larimore | def. | Mike Madrid | TKO (Punches) | 1 | 2:30 |
| | Danny August | def. | Corey Jagger | TKO (Punches) | 1 | 2:52 |

== KOTC: Underground 63 ==
KOTC: Underground 63 was an event held on October 2, 2010, at the Avi Casino in Laughlin, Nevada.

=== Results ===
Main Card
| Weight class | | | | Method | Round | Time | Notes |
|---|---|---|---|---|---|---|---|
| | Sean Strickland | def. | Adriel Montes | TKO (Punches) | 2 | 1:05 |
| | Jason Lane | def. | Mike Bourke | TKO (Punches) | 1 | 0:46 |
| | Ernie Calma | def. | Jeremy Chavez | Submission (Keylock) | 1 | 1:34 |
| | Ernie Perea | def. | John Cauley | KO (Knee) | 1 | 0:41 |
| | Scotty Merrit | def. | Chris Floyd | Submission (Armbar) | 1 | 1:51 |
| | Brandon Ellsworth | def. | Kevin Meredith | TKO (Punches) | 3 | 2:28 |
| | Matt Muramoto | def. | Davis Perez | Decision (Unanimous) | 3 | 3:00 |
| | Jake Brennan | def. | Abisai Lopez | Decision (Unanimous) | 3 | 3:00 |
| | Jose Portocarrero | def. | George Wright | TKO (Retirement) | 1 | 3:00 |
| | Tony Reis | def. | Brian Skinner | Submission (Guillotine Choke) | 1 | 1:30 |
| | John Brubaker | def. | Junior Gomez | Submission (Rear-Naked Choke) | 2 | 1:13 |
| | Taylor Schmidt | def. | John Fjyr | Submission (Arm-Triangle Choke) | 3 | 2:37 |
| | Kris Armbrister | def. | Alex Brooks | Submission (Rear-Naked Choke) | 2 | 2:06 |

== KOTC: Inferno ==
KOTC: Inferno was an event held on October 7, 2010, at the San Manuel Casino in Highland, California.

=== Results ===
Main Card
| Weight class | | | | Method | Round | Time | Notes |
|---|---|---|---|---|---|---|---|
| Junior Welterweight | Tim Means | def. | Bobby Green (c) | TKO (Retirement) | 2 | 5:00 | (Note: For The King of the Cage Junior Welterweight Championship.) |
| | David Gomez | def. | Alex Suhonosov | TKO (Punches) | 2 | 4:04 |
| | Kenny McCorkell | def. | Demetrice Woods | Submission (Armbar) | 1 | 2:14 |
| | Adam Rothweiler | vs. | Nick Garcia | No Contest | 0 | 0:00 |
| | Musa Toliver | def. | Joe Condon | Decision (Unanimous) | 3 | 3:00 |
| | Todd Willingham | def. | Zachary Brennan | Decision (Unanimous) | 3 | 3:00 |
| | Daniel McWilliams | def. | Tony Dalton | Decision (Unanimous) | 3 | 3:00 |

== KOTC: High Profile ==
KOTC: High Profile was an event held on October 9, 2010, at the Lake of the Torches Casino in Lac Du Flambeau, Wisconsin.

=== Results ===
Main Card
| Weight class | | | | Method | Round | Time | Notes |
|---|---|---|---|---|---|---|---|
| | Sam Alvey | def. | William Hill | KO (Punch) | 2 | 2:22 |
| | Morgan Sickinger | vs. | David Rhoads | No Contest | 2 | 0:00 |
| | Dallas O'Malley | def. | Adam Kope | Submission (Guillotine Choke) | 1 | 2:47 |
| | Brian Bagin | def. | Shane Cadotte | Submission (Rear-Naked Choke) | 1 | 1:00 |
| | Derrick Kaul | def. | Larry Quagon | Submission (Arm-Triangle Choke) | 2 | 1:16 |
| | Chris Alexander | def. | Monty Cortright | Submission (Punches) | 1 | 2:40 |
| | Damon Butterfield | def. | Terry Dahl | Submission (Rear-Naked Choke) | 1 | 2:46 |
| | Reed Jensen | def. | Steve Naglosy | TKO (Punches) | 2 | 0:41 |
| | Jordan Winski | def. | Alex Graves | Submission (Rear-Naked Choke) | 1 | 0:49 |
| | Hideo Ota | def. | Dustin Brahmer | Submission (Guillotine Choke) | 1 | 0:21 |
| | Matt Gauthier | def. | Jimmy Hong | TKO (Punches) | 1 | 0:33 |

== KOTC: Free Fall ==
KOTC: Free Fall was an event held on October 23, 2010, at the Northern Lights Casino in Walker, Minnesota.

=== Results ===
Main Card
| Weight class | | | | Method | Round | Time | Notes |
|---|---|---|---|---|---|---|---|
| | Bobby Ferrier | def. | R.T. Hicks | Submission (Punches) | 1 | 1:00 |
| | Rocco Maggorie | def. | Chad Vaudrin | Submission (Arm-Triangle Choke) | 2 | 2:16 |
| | Kurt Etchison | def. | William Kassulker | Decision (Unanimous) | 3 | 5:00 |
| | Kyle Jensen | def. | Lucas St. Claire | Submission (Arm-Triangle Choke) | 1 | 2:16 |
| | Dallon White | def. | Brad Hofstrand | Submission (Rear-Naked Choke) | 1 | 0:59 |
| | Kyle Matuszak | def. | Zach Kellso | Submission (Punches) | 1 | 0:52 |
| | Ryan Sweezer | def. | Eli Finn | TKO (Punches) | 1 | 2:38 |
| | Corey Anderson | def. | Keith Stensgard | Submission (Punches) | 1 | 0:57 |
| | J.J. Holloway | def. | Corey Wilson | TKO (Punches) | 1 | 1:45 |
| | Joe Livingston | def. | Nick Merkley | TKO (Punches) | 2 | 1:08 |
| | Josh Holtz | def. | Dan Church | Submission (Triangle Choke) | 1 | 1:24 |

== KOTC: Mainstream ==
KOTC: Mainstream was an event held on October 29, 2010, at the Jackpot Junction Casino in Morton, Minnesota.

=== Results ===
Main Card
| Weight class | | | | Method | Round | Time | Notes |
|---|---|---|---|---|---|---|---|
| | Brock Larson | def. | Gabe Walbridge | Submission (Punches) | 1 | 1:13 |
| | Brandon Girtz | def. | Bobby Ferrier | Submission (Keylock) | 2 | 2:02 |
| | Bryan Barberena | def. | Garrett Olson | TKO (Punches) | 2 | 4:24 |
| | Adam McDonough | def. | BJ VanBueskom | TKO (Punches) | 2 | 2:30 |
| | Nathan Schut | def. | Andy Selvig | Submission (Punches) | 1 | 1:28 |
| | Josh Janousek | def. | Michael Suttles Jr. | Submission (Punches) | 1 | 1:00 |
| | Justin Kratzke | def. | Jason Zimmer | Submission (Punches) | 1 | 2:17 |
| | Mike Zimmer | def. | Kevin Barberena | Decision (Unanimous) | 3 | 3:00 |
| | Kody Barberena | def. | Mouka Dara | Decision (Unanimous) | 3 | 3:00 |
| | Anthony Kellen | def. | Zach Kellso | Submission (Armbar) | 2 | 2:08 |

== KOTC: Underground 64 ==
KOTC: Underground 64 was an event held on November 6, 2010, at the Kewadin Casino in Sault Ste Marie, Michigan.

=== Results ===
Main Card
| Weight class | | | | Method | Round | Time | Notes |
|---|---|---|---|---|---|---|---|
| | Brent Fryia | def. | Chris Bourdon | Submission (Rear-Naked Choke) | 1 | 2:28 |
| | Cody Wall | def. | Paul Howard | Submission (Armbar) | 2 | 2:58 |
| | Trevor Manchester | def. | Justin Reynolds | Decision (Unanimous) | 3 | 3:00 |
| | Jesse Jackson | def. | Pat Gionette | Submission (Rear-Naked Choke) | 2 | 0:44 |
| | Nick Naccarato | def. | John Teebo | TKO (Retirement) | 1 | 3:00 |
| | Mitch Fryia | def. | Toney Sterk | Submission (Armbar) | 1 | 1:32 |
| | Jake Parish | def. | Matt Bertola | Submission (Punches) | 2 | 0:50 |
| | Owen Martin | def. | Chuck Sator | TKO (Punches) | 1 | 1:10 |
| | Jeremy Matter | def. | Tyler Robinson | Submission (Punches) | 1 | 1:32 |
| | Darren Manion | def. | Victor Jones | Decision (Unanimous) | 3 | 3:00 |
| | Shawn Gonzales | def. | Dan Teeple | Submission (Punches) | 1 | 2:45 |
| | Dalton Macfarlane | def. | Alric Jones | TKO (Punches) | 1 | 1:18 |

== KOTC: Infusion ==
KOTC: Infusion was an event held on November 13, 2010, at the Eastside Cannery Casino and Hotel in Las Vegas, Nevada.

=== Results ===
Main Card
| Weight class | | | | Method | Round | Time | Notes |
|---|---|---|---|---|---|---|---|
| | Nick Gaston | def. | Josh Watson | Submission (Rear-Naked Choke) | 2 | 3:13 |
| | Tony Johnson | def. | Boban Simic | Decision (Unanimous) | 3 | 5:00 |
| | David Hulett | def. | Danny Davis Jr. | Submission (Arm-Triangle Choke) | 1 | 2:54 |
| | Chidi Njokuani | def. | Jack Montgomery | Submission (Guillotine Choke) | 1 | 1:35 |
| | Todd Willingham | def. | John Hahn | KO (Punches) | 1 | 0:32 |
| | Casey Noland | def. | Amy Riehle | TKO (Punches) | 1 | 2:34 |
| | Jimmy Jones | def. | Scott Brommage | KO (Punches) | 1 | 0:11 |
| | Ian Omalza | def. | Anthony Guerra | Submission (Rear-Naked Choke) | 1 | 1:55 |

== KOTC: Platinum ==
KOTC: Platinum was an event held on November 25, 2010, at the Durban International Convention Centre in Durban, South Africa.

=== Results ===
Main Card
| Weight class | | | | Method | Round | Time | Notes |
|---|---|---|---|---|---|---|---|
| | Mike Bourke | def. | Ken Shamrock | TKO (Punches) | 1 | 2:00 |
| | Sean Strickland | def. | Donavin Hawkey | Submission (Rear-Naked Choke) | 1 | 1:21 |
| | Dain Neveling | def. | Dean Van Rooyen | KO (Punches) | 1 | 2:02 |
| | Paul Cunningham | def. | Mike de Bruyn | Submission (Armbar) | 1 | 2:39 |
| | Brian Thomas | def. | Craig Fourie | Submission | 2 | 1:45 |
| | Mawande Mazithambe | def. | James Du Toit | TKO (Punches) | 1 | 1:19 |
| | Donald Nzirawa | def. | Tyrel Singh | Submission (Guillotine Choke) | 2 | 4:01 |
| | Brandon Parker | def. | Dirkie Klopper | Submission (Keylock) | 1 | 3:34 |
| | Abdul Hassan | def. | Ralph Drewes | KO (Punches) | 1 | 1:07 |
| | Morne van Niekerk | def. | Brandin Fourie | KO (Punches) | 2 | 0:07 |
| | Josh Muller | def. | Dan Eckroid | Submission (Rear-Naked Choke) | 2 | 1:01 |
| | Martin Da Beer | def. | Brad Warren | TKO (Punches) | 1 | 0:49 |
| | Waynard Mare | def. | Jason Culverwell | Submission (Armbar) | 1 | 1:58 |
| | Paul Vosloo | def. | Peter Nyide | DQ | 1 | 2:17 |
| | Justin Radford | def. | Jody Venter | Submission (Rear-Naked Choke) | 1 | 2:01 |
| | David van Schalkwyk | def. | Kyle Collins | TKO (Punches) | 1 | 2:16 |
| | Calven Msane | def. | Radley de Vries | Decision (Split) | 3 | 3:00 |

== KOTC: Zero Tolerance ==
KOTC: Zero Tolerance was an event held on November 27, 2010, at the Inn of the Mountain Gods Resort and Casino in Mescalero, New Mexico.

=== Results ===
Main Card
| Weight class | | | | Method | Round | Time | Notes |
|---|---|---|---|---|---|---|---|
| | Patrick Dixon | def. | Javier Rubio | TKO (Punches) | 1 | 1:58 |
| | Isaque Martinez | def. | Eric McElroy | Submission (Arm-Triangle Choke) | 1 | 1:00 |
| | Gerald Sedillo | def. | Donnie Frye | Submission (Rear-Naked Choke) | 1 | 1:50 |
| | Gabriel Vasquez | def. | Dave Monogye | TKO (Punches) | 1 | 1:25 |
| | Fabian Vasquez | def. | Andrew Vasquez | Submission (Kimura) | 1 | 1:45 |
| | James Flores | def. | Grant Hobbs | Decision (Unanimous) | 3 | 3:00 |
| | Tim Sosa | def. | Charlie Villegas | Submission (Armbar) | 1 | 0:51 |
| | Preston Monongye | def. | Jerry Castillo | Submission (Punches) | 2 | 2:01 |
| | DJ Barnes | def. | Edward Smith | Submission (Guillotine Choke) | 1 | 1:41 |
| | Julian Nevarez | def. | Albert Harris | TKO (Punches) | 1 | 2:04 |
| | JP Garcia | def. | Greg Varela | Submission (Rear-Naked Choke) | 1 | 2:09 |

== KOTC: Steel ==
KOTC: Steel was an event held on December 9, 2010, at the San Manuel Casino in San Bernardino, California.

=== Results ===
Main Card
| Weight class | | | | Method | Round | Time | Notes |
|---|---|---|---|---|---|---|---|
| | Lyle Beerbohm | def. | Jorge Sarat | TKO (Punches) | 2 | 3:48 |
| | Tony Hervey | def. | Mike Roberts | TKO (Punches) | 2 | 1:19 |
| | Ben Lagman | def. | Nick Verrett | Submission (Kimura) | 1 | 1:09 |
| | Angelo Popofski | def. | Joshua Taibl | Submission (Rear-Naked Choke) | 1 | 0:45 |
| | Jay Freeman | def. | Terry Davinney | TKO (Punches) | 1 | 0:18 |
| | Scott Bickerstaff | def. | Mark Lichti | Submission (Punches) | 1 | 1:48 |
| | Nick Bismack | def. | Cody Camp | Submission (Leg Scissor Choke) | 2 | 1:52 |
| | Nick Gaston | def. | Troy Fox | TKO (Doctor Stoppage) | 1 | 3:00 |
| | David Newport | def. | Mike Sommer | TKO (Punches) | 1 | 1:36 |
| | John Durran | def. | Justin Naylor | Submission (Rear-Naked Choke) | 2 | 0:21 |
| | Robert Richardson | def. | Calem Willis | Submission (Punches) | 1 | 1:50 |

== See also ==
- List of King of the Cage events
- List of King of the Cage champions
