= UFC 158 =

UFC mixed martial arts event in 2013

UFC 158: St-Pierre vs. Diaz
- The poster for UFC 158: St-Pierre vs. Diaz
- Promotion: Ultimate Fighting Championship
- Date: March 16, 2013
- Venue: Bell Centre
- City: Montreal, Quebec, Canada
- Attendance: 20,145
- Total gate: $3,630,166
- Buyrate: 950,000

Event chronology
UFC on Fuel TV: Silva vs. Stann	UFC 158: St-Pierre vs. Diaz	UFC on Fuel TV: Mousasi vs. Latifi

UFC 158: St-Pierre vs. Diaz was a mixed martial arts event held by the Ultimate Fighting Championship on March 16, 2013, at the Bell Centre in Montreal, Quebec, Canada.

== Background ==
The main event was the culmination of the rivalry between Georges St-Pierre and Nick Diaz, with the latter having been vocal in wanting to fight the current champion for nearly two years.

A rematch between Alessio Sakara and Patrick Côté, from UFC 154, was briefly linked to this event. However, Sakara was forced out of the bout due to renal stress.

Sean Pierson was expected to face Rick Story at the event. However, Pierson pulled out of the bout citing an injury and was replaced by Quinn Mulhern.

Rory MacDonald was originally scheduled to face Carlos Condit in a rematch. However, on February 18, it was announced that MacDonald pulled out of the bout citing a neck injury. Condit instead faced Johny Hendricks, who was pulled from his bout with Jake Ellenberger. Ellenberger then faced returning veteran Nate Marquardt.

Mitch Gagnon was expected to face Issei Tamura at the event. However, Gagnon was forced out of the bout with an injury and was replaced by T.J. Dillashaw.

Johnny Eduardo was expected to face Yves Jabouin at the event. However, on March 6, Eduardo was forced to pull out of the bout citing a shoulder injury. Jabouin was then pulled from the card as a suitable replacement could not be found on short notice.

== Results ==
Main card
Weight class				Method	Round	Time	Notes
Welterweight	Georges St-Pierre (c)	def.	Nick Diaz	Decision (unanimous) (50–45, 50–45, 50–45)	5	5:00	(Note: For the UFC Welterweight Championship.)
Welterweight	Johny Hendricks	def.	Carlos Condit	Decision (unanimous) (29–28, 29–28, 29–28)	3	5:00
Welterweight	Jake Ellenberger	def.	Nate Marquardt	KO (punches)	1	3:00
Middleweight	Chris Camozzi	def.	Nick Ring	Decision (split) (29–28, 28–29, 29–28)	3	5:00
Lightweight	Mike Ricci	def.	Colin Fletcher	Decision (unanimous) (30–27, 30–27, 30–27)	3	5:00
Preliminary card (FX)
Welterweight	Patrick Côté	def.	Bobby Voelker	Decision (unanimous) (29–28, 29–28, 29–28)	3	5:00
Featherweight	Darren Elkins	def.	Antonio Carvalho	TKO (punches)	1	3:06
Welterweight	Jordan Mein	def.	Dan Miller	TKO (punches)	1	4:42
Lightweight	John Makdessi	def.	Daron Cruickshank	Decision (unanimous) (29–28, 29–28, 29–28)	3	5:00
Preliminary card (Facebook and YouTube)
Welterweight	Rick Story	def.	Quinn Mulhern	TKO (punches)	1	3:05
Bantamweight	T.J. Dillashaw	def.	Issei Tamura	KO (knee and punches)	2	0:26
Bantamweight	George Roop	def.	Reuben Duran	Decision (unanimous) (29–28, 29–28, 30–27)	3	5:00

== Bonus awards ==
Fighters were awarded $50,000 bonuses.

- Fight of the Night: Johny Hendricks vs. Carlos Condit
- Knockout of the Night: Jake Ellenberger
- Submission of the Night: Not awarded as no matches ended by submission.

== See also ==
- List of UFC events
- 2013 in UFC
