= UFC 157 =

UFC mixed martial arts event in 2013

UFC 157: Rousey vs. Carmouche
- The poster for UFC 157: Rousey vs. Carmouche
- Promotion: Ultimate Fighting Championship
- Date: February 23, 2013
- Venue: Honda Center
- City: Anaheim, California
- Attendance: 13,257
- Total gate: 1,350,191
- Buyrate: 450,000

Event chronology
| UFC on Fuel TV: Barão vs. McDonald | UFC 157: Rousey vs. Carmouche | UFC on Fuel TV: Silva vs. Stann |

UFC 157: Rousey vs. Carmouche was a mixed martial arts event held by the Ultimate Fighting Championship on February 23, 2013, at the Honda Center in Anaheim, California.

== Background ==
The headline bout between Ronda Rousey and Liz Carmouche was the first-ever women's fight in UFC history. The two fought in the newly created 135-pound bantamweight division for the UFC Women's Bantamweight Championship. Rousey was the defending champion, as she was awarded the championship at a UFC on Fox: Henderson vs. Diaz pre-event press conference on December 6, 2012, prior to which she was the Strikeforce Women's Bantamweight Champion.

Manny Gamburyan was expected to face Chad Mendes at the event; however, Gamburyan was forced out of the bout with a thumb and elbow injury. Mendes was then pulled from the card as a suitable replacement could not be found on short notice. As a result, the bout between Court McGee and Josh Neer was promoted to the main card.

Former SuperBrawl, ICON Sport and EliteXC middleweight champion and Strikeforce middleweight title challenger Robbie Lawler made his return to UFC since UFC 50, facing Josh Koscheck in the welterweight division. This is also Lawler's first fight at welterweight since UFC 47.

At the weigh-ins, Nah-Shon Burrell came into his bout with Yuri Villefort heavy, weighing in at 175.8 lb. Villefort had already agreed in advance to a catchweight bout and received a portion of Burrell's purse.

15,525 people purchased tickets to watch the event at the arena, and there were 450,000 pay-per-view buys.

== Results ==
Main Card
| Weight class | | | | Method | Round | Time | Notes |
|---|---|---|---|---|---|---|---|
| Women's Bantamweight | Ronda Rousey (c) | def. | Liz Carmouche | Submission (armbar) | 1 | 4:49 | (Note: For the UFC Women's Bantamweight Championship.) |
| Light Heavyweight | Lyoto Machida | def. | Dan Henderson | Decision (split) (28–29, 29–28, 29–28) | 3 | 5:00 |
| Bantamweight | Urijah Faber | def. | Ivan Menjivar | Submission (rear-naked choke) | 1 | 4:34 |
| Welterweight | Court McGee | def. | Josh Neer | Decision (unanimous) (30–27, 30–27, 30–27) | 3 | 5:00 |
| Welterweight | Robbie Lawler | def. | Josh Koscheck | TKO (knee and punches) | 1 | 3:57 |
Preliminary Card (FX)
| Heavyweight | Brendan Schaub | def. | Lavar Johnson | Decision (unanimous) (30–27, 30–27, 30–27) | 3 | 5:00 |
| Lightweight | Michael Chiesa | def. | Anton Kuivanen | Submission (rear-naked choke) | 2 | 2:29 |
| Featherweight | Dennis Bermudez | def. | Matt Grice | Decision (split) (28–29, 29–28, 29–28) | 3 | 5:00 |
| Lightweight | Sam Stout | def. | Caros Fodor | Decision (split) (28–29, 29–28, 29–28) | 3 | 5:00 |
Preliminary Card (Facebook)
| Welterweight | Kenny Robertson | def. | Brock Jardine | Submission (Suloev stretch) | 1 | 2:57 | (Note: This bout aired on the broadcast following the Faber vs Menjivar bout.) |
| Welterweight | Neil Magny | def. | Jon Manley | Decision (unanimous) (30–27, 30–27, 29–28) | 3 | 5:00 |
| Catchweight (175.8 lb) | Nah-Shon Burrell | def. | Yuri Villefort | Decision (unanimous) (30–27, 29–28, 29–28) | 3 | 5:00 |

== Bonus awards ==
Fighters were awarded $50,000 bonuses.

- Fight of the Night: Dennis Bermudez vs. Matt Grice
- Knockout of the Night: Robbie Lawler
- Submission of the Night: Kenny Robertson

== Reported payout ==
The following is the reported payout to the fighters as reported to the California State Athletic Commission. It does not include sponsor money and also does not include the UFC's traditional "fight night" bonuses or Pay-Per-View quotas.

- Ronda Rousey: $90,000 (includes $45,000 win bonus) def. Liz Carmouche: $12,000
- Lyoto Machida: $200,000 (no win bonus) def. Dan Henderson: $250,000
- Urijah Faber: $100,000 (includes $50,000 win bonus) def. Ivan Menjivar: $17,000
- Court McGee: $40,000 (includes $20,000 win bonus) def. Josh Neer: $16,000
- Robbie Lawler: $105,000 (includes $10,000 win bonus) def. Josh Koscheck: $78,000
- Brendan Schaub: $36,000 (includes $18,000 win bonus) def. Lavar Johnson: $29,000
- Michael Chiesa: $30,000 (includes $15,000 win bonus) def. Anton Kuivanen: $8,000
- Dennis Bermudez: $20,000 (includes $10,000 win bonus) def. Matt Grice: $8,000
- Sam Stout: $52,000 (includes $26,000 win bonus) def. Caros Fodor: $15,000
- Kenny Robertson: $16,000 (includes $8,000 win bonus) def. Brock Jardine: $8,000
- Neil Magny: $16,000 (includes $8,000 win bonus) def. Jon Manley: $8,000
- Nah-Shon Burrell: $12,500 (includes $7,000 win bonus) def. Yuri Villefort: $6,550 ^

^ Nah-Shon Burrell was fined and a percentage of his fight purse went to Yuri Villefort for failing to make the required weight for his fight.

== See also ==
- List of UFC events
- 2013 in UFC
