= Alex Garcia (fighter) =

Dominican Republic mixed martial artist

- Born: Lenin Billy Garcia Ciriaco; July 14, 1987 (age 39); Santiago, Dominican Republic
- Other names: The Dominican Nightmare
- Height: 5 ft 9 in (1.75 m)
- Weight: 171 lb (78 kg; 12 st 3 lb)
- Division: Welterweight
- Reach: 72 in (183 cm)
- Style: Kickboxing, Submission Wrestling
- Fighting out of: Montreal, Quebec, Canada
- Team: Tristar Gym
- Years active: 2009-present

Mixed martial arts record
- Total: 23
- Wins: 15
- By knockout: 6
- By submission: 6
- By decision: 3
- Losses: 8
- By knockout: 4
- By decision: 4

Other information
- Mixed martial arts record from Sherdog

Alex Garcia (born July 14, 1987) is a Dominican mixed martial artist who formerly competed in the Welterweight division of the Ultimate Fighting Championship.

== Mixed martial arts career ==
Garcia made his professional debut in the summer of 2009 against Joel Vales at AFC 1. He won the fight via submission in the first round. Garcia would win his next five fights with finishes in all of them, with all of them but one finishing in the first round. Garcia experienced his first professional defeat at the hands of UFC vet Seth Baczynski by knockout at Ringside MMA 10, the fight was for the Interim Ringside Welterweight title. After the loss Garcia went on to win four more straight fights finishing three of the four wins in the first round.

=== Ultimate Fighting Championship ===
On October 8, 2013, it was announced that Garcia was signed with the UFC and was expected to make his debut in UFC Fight Night 33 against fellow newcomer Andreas Stahl. Stahl had to pull out with an injury. Garcia's new opponent for the event was former TUF Smashes cast member Ben Wall. Garcia won the fight via knockout just 43 seconds into the first round.

Garcia next faced Sean Spencer on March 15, 2014, at UFC 171. He won the back-and-forth fight via split decision.

Garcia was expected to face promotional newcomer Matt Dwyer on August 2, 2014, at UFC 176. However, Dwyer pulled out of the bout citing injury, and was replaced by Neil Magny. Subsequently, after UFC 176 was canceled, Magny/Garcia was rescheduled and eventually took place on August 23, 2014, at UFC Fight Night 49. He lost the fight by unanimous decision.

Garcia faced Mike Swick on July 11, 2015, at UFC 189. He won the fight by unanimous decision.

Garcia faced Sean Strickland on February 21, 2016, at UFC Fight Night 83. After a back-and-forth first two rounds, he lost the fight via TKO in the third round.

Garcia was expected to face Colby Covington on June 18, 2016, at UFC Fight Night 89. However, Garcia was pulled from the fight on June 10 for undisclosed reasons and replaced by promotional newcomer Jonathan Meunier.

Garcia faced Mike Pyle on December 30, 2016, at UFC 207. He won the fight by knockout in the first round. The win also earned Garcia his first Performance of the Night bonus award.

Garcia faced Tim Means on June 25, 2017, at UFC Fight Night 112. He lost by unanimous decision.

Garcia faced Muslim Salikhov on November 25, 2017, at UFC Fight Night 122. He won the fight via submission in the second round.

Gracia faced Ryan LaFlare on April 21, 2018, at UFC Fight Night 128. He lost the fight via unanimous decision.

Garcia faced Court McGee on October 27, 2018, at UFC Fight Night 138. He lost the fight by unanimous decision.

On September 20, 2019, it was reported that Garcia was released from the UFC.

== Drug trafficking charges ==
On December 8, 2025, the Montreal City Police Service (SPVM) conducted a major anti-gang operation that resulted in Garcia's arrest along with two other suspects. Garcia is facing drug trafficking and related charges connected to a seizure of 102 kilograms of cocaine, with an estimated street value of over CAD $2.3 million. During the investigation, police also found 5 kg of heroin, 20 litres of GHB, CAD $306,000 in cash, three firearms, and two vehicles.

== Championships and accomplishments ==
- Ultimate Fighting Championship
  - Performance of the Night (one time) vs. Mike Pyle

== Mixed martial arts record ==
Professional record breakdown
23 matches	15 wins	8 losses
By knockout	6	4
By submission	6	0
By decision	3	4

Res.	Record	Opponent	Method	Event	Date	Round	Time	Location	Notes
Loss	15–8	Abdul-Rahman Dzhanaev	TKO (punches)	ACA 105	6 March 2020	2	0:44	Almaty, Kazakhstan	
Loss	15–7	Ibragim Chuzhigaev	TKO (punches)	ACA 99	27 September 2019	1	1:52	Moscow, Russia	Middleweight debut.
Loss	15–6	Court McGee	Decision (unanimous)	UFC Fight Night: Volkan vs. Smith	October 27, 2018	3	5:00	Moncton, New Brunswick, Canada	
Loss	15–5	Ryan LaFlare	Decision (unanimous)	UFC Fight Night: Barboza vs. Lee	April 21, 2018	3	5:00	Atlantic City, New Jersey, United States	
Win	15–4	Muslim Salikhov	Submission (rear-naked choke)	UFC Fight Night: Bisping vs. Gastelum	November 25, 2017	2	3:22	Shanghai, China	
Loss	14–4	Tim Means	Decision (unanimous)	UFC Fight Night: Chiesa vs. Lee	June 25, 2017	3	5:00	Oklahoma City, Oklahoma, United States	
Win	14–3	Mike Pyle	KO (punch)	UFC 207	December 30, 2016	1	3:34	Las Vegas, Nevada, United States	Performance of the Night.
Loss	13–3	Sean Strickland	KO (punches)	UFC Fight Night: Cowboy vs. Cowboy	February 21, 2016	3	4:25	Pittsburgh, Pennsylvania, United States	
Win	13–2	Mike Swick	Decision (unanimous)	UFC 189	July 11, 2015	3	5:00	Las Vegas, Nevada, United States	
Loss	12–2	Neil Magny	Decision (unanimous)	UFC Fight Night: Henderson vs. dos Anjos	August 23, 2014	3	5:00	Tulsa, Oklahoma, United States	
Win	12–1	Sean Spencer	Decision (split)	UFC 171	March 15, 2014	3	5:00	Dallas, Texas, United States	
Win	11–1	Ben Wall	KO (punches)	UFC Fight Night: Hunt vs. Bigfoot	December 7, 2013	1	0:43	Brisbane, Australia	
Win	10–1	Chris Heatherly	Submission (rear-naked choke)	Challenge MMA 2	August 17, 2013	1	1:42	Montreal, Quebec, Canada	
Win	9–1	Ryan Dickson	Decision (unanimous)	Challenge MMA 1	May 11, 2013	3	5:00	St-Jean-sur-Richelieu, Quebec, Canada	
Win	8–1	Stephane Lamarche	Submission (rear-naked choke)	InterBox: Slamm 1	November 30, 2012	1	1:58	Montreal, Quebec, Canada	
Win	7–1	Matt MacGrath	KO (punches)	Ringside MMA 12	October 21, 2011	1	0:34	Montreal, Quebec, Canada	
Loss	6–1	Seth Baczynski	KO (punches)	Ringside MMA 10	April 9, 2011	2	2:44	Montreal, Quebec, Canada	For the interim Ringside Welterweight Championship.
Win	6–0	Tyler Jackson	Submission (rear-naked choke)	Ringside MMA 9	November 13, 2010	1	4:51	Montreal, Quebec, Canada	Catchweight (175 lb) bout.
Win	5–0	Ricky Goodall	Submission (rear-naked choke)	Ringside MMA 7	June 18, 2010	1	4:05	Montreal, Quebec, Canada	
Win	4–0	Jaret MacIntosh	TKO (punches)	Ringside MMA 6	April 10, 2010	1	0:44	Montreal, Quebec, Canada	
Win	3–0	Matt Northcott	TKO (punches)	Ringside MMA 5	January 30, 2010	3	3:44	Montreal, Quebec, Canada	
Win	2–0	T.J. Coletti	TKO (punches)	Mixed Fighting League 1	October 17, 2009	1	3:34	Montreal, Quebec, Canada	
Win	1–0	Joel Vales	Submission (armbar)	Alianza Full Contact 1	August 28, 2009	1	1:24	Santo Domingo, Dominican Republic	Welterweight debut.

== See also ==
- List of current UFC fighters
- List of male mixed martial artists
