= Sean Spencer (fighter) =

American mixed martial arts fighter

- Born: June 25, 1987 (age 39); Bluefield, Virginia, United States
- Nationality: American
- Height: 5 ft 10 in (1.78 m)
- Weight: 170 lb (77 kg; 12 st)
- Division: Middleweight; Welterweight
- Reach: 75 in (191 cm)
- Stance: Southpaw
- Fighting out of: Dallas, Texas, United States
- Team: Fortis MMA; Mohler MMA
- Years active: 2009–present

Mixed martial arts record
- Total: 19
- Wins: 12
- By knockout: 2
- By submission: 2
- By decision: 8
- Losses: 7
- By knockout: 2
- By submission: 3
- By decision: 2

Other information
- Mixed martial arts record from Sherdog

Sean Tyrone Spencer (born June 25, 1987) is an American mixed martial artist currently competing in the Welterweight division of the Legacy Fighting Alliance. A professional since 2009, he has also competed for the UFC, Bellator, and Legacy FC.

== Background ==
Born and raised in Bluefield, Virginia, Spencer played football through high school. In 2006, he began competing in amateur boxing, and was a Golden Gloves Champion.

== Mixed martial arts career ==
=== Early career ===
After compiling an amateur record of 5–1 with one no contest, Spencer began his professional career in 2009. Until 2011, he fought mainly for such Texas-based promotions as King of Kombat and Supreme Warrior Championship. With a record of seven wins and one loss, he signed with Bellator.

=== Bellator MMA ===
Spencer faced Joseph Daily on March 23, 2012, at Bellator 62 and won via submission due to a rear-naked choke in the second round.

=== Legacy Fighting Championship ===
Spencer was expected to face Hayward Charles on August 17, 2012, at Legacy FC 13. However, due to undisclosed reasons, Spencer was rescheduled to face Evan Cutts in the same event. He defeated Cutts via unanimous decision (29-28, 29–28, 29–28).

Spencer was scheduled to face Roy Spoon on April 12, 2013, at Legacy FC 19 but it was announced in January 2013 that he had in fact signed with the UFC to replace an injured Magnus Cedenblad against Rafael Natal.

=== Ultimate Fighting Championship ===
Spencer made his promotional debut on short notice against Rafael Natal on January 26, 2013, at UFC on Fox: Johnson vs. Dodson. He was defeated via submission due to arm-triangle choke in the third round.

In his second fight in the promotion, Spencer moved down to the welterweight division and faced Yuri Villefort on September 4, 2013, at UFC Fight Night 28. He won the fight via split decision (30-27 Spencer, 29-28 Villefort, 29-28 Spencer).

Spencer was called to replace an injured Zak Cummings against Sérgio Moraes on November 30, 2013, at The Ultimate Fighter 18 Finale. However, Moraes also got injured and Spencer instead faced promotional newcomer Drew Dober. He won the fight via unanimous decision.

Spencer next faced Alex Garcia on March 15, 2014, at UFC 171. He lost the back-and-forth fight via split decision.

Spencer was expected to face Luiz Dutra on June 28, 2014, at UFC Fight Night: Swanson vs. Stephens but the bout was scrapped due to an injury from Dutra.

Spencer faced Paulo Thiago on September 13, 2014, at UFC Fight Night 51, replacing an injured Joe Riggs. Spencer won the fight via unanimous decision.

Spencer faced Cathal Pendred on January 18, 2015, at UFC Fight Night 59. Spencer lost the fight by a controversial unanimous decision. Both Joe Rogan and Mike Goldberg had felt Spencer had dominated the fight and declared on air how baffling the decision was; later UFC president Dana White echoed this sentiment on air. Likewise, all 15 major MMA media outlets scored the fight in favor of Spencer.

Spencer was expected to face Mike Pyle on May 23, 2015, at UFC 187, but an injury forced Spencer out of the bout, and he was replaced by Colby Covington.

The bout with Pyle was rescheduled and eventually took place on February 6, 2016, at UFC Fight Night 82. Spencer lost the back-and-forth fight via TKO in the third round. Both participants were awarded Fight of the Night for their performance.

Spencer next faced Yancy Medeiros on September 10, 2016, at UFC 203. He lost the fight via submission in the second round.

=== Return to LFA ===
After being released from the UFC, Spencer returned to Legacy Fighting Alliance. Spencer fought Bilal Williams at LFA 47 and lost via TKO in the second round.

== Championships and accomplishments ==
- Ultimate Fighting Championship
  - Fight of the Night (One time)

== Mixed martial arts record ==
Professional record breakdown
19 matches	12 wins	7 losses
By knockout	2	2
By submission	2	3
By decision	8	2

Res.	Record	Opponent	Method	Event	Date	Round	Time	Location	Notes
Loss	12–7	Bilal Williams	TKO (punches)	LFA 47	August 10, 2018	2	0:58	Dallas, Texas, United States	
Loss	12–6	Yancy Medeiros	Submission (rear-naked choke)	UFC 203	September 10, 2016	2	0:49	Cleveland, Ohio, United States	
Loss	12–5	Mike Pyle	TKO (elbows and knees)	UFC Fight Night: Hendricks vs. Thompson	February 6, 2016	3	4:25	Las Vegas, Nevada, United States	Fight of the Night.
Loss	12–4	Cathal Pendred	Decision (unanimous)	UFC Fight Night: McGregor vs. Siver	January 18, 2015	3	5:00	Boston, Massachusetts, United States	
Win	12–3	Paulo Thiago	Decision (unanimous)	UFC Fight Night: Bigfoot vs. Arlovski	September 13, 2014	3	5:00	Brasília, Brazil	
Loss	11–3	Alex Garcia	Decision (split)	UFC 171	March 15, 2014	3	5:00	Dallas, Texas, United States	
Win	11–2	Drew Dober	Decision (unanimous)	The Ultimate Fighter: Team Rousey vs. Team Tate Finale	November 30, 2013	3	5:00	Las Vegas, Nevada, United States	
Win	10–2	Yuri Villefort	Decision (split)	UFC Fight Night: Teixeira vs. Bader	September 4, 2013	3	5:00	Belo Horizonte, Brazil	
Loss	9–2	Rafael Natal	Submission (arm-triangle choke)	UFC on Fox: Johnson vs. Dodson	January 26, 2013	3	2:13	Chicago, Illinois, United States	Middleweight bout.
Win	9–1	Evan Cutts	Decision (unanimous)	Legacy FC 13	August 17, 2012	3	5:00	Dallas, Texas, United States	
Win	8–1	Joseph Daily	Submission (rear-naked choke)	Bellator 62	March 23, 2012	2	1:24	Laredo, Texas, United States	Catchweight (173.2 lbs) bout; Daily missed weight.
Win	7–1	Derrick Krantz	Decision (unanimous)	Fight Game: Premier Event	December 12, 2011	3	5:00	Frisco, Texas, United States	
Loss	6–1	Ali Hanjani	Submission (triangle choke)	MMA Fight Pit: Genesis	August 13, 2011	1	1:41	Albuquerque, New Mexico, United States	Welterweight debut.
Win	6–0	Kreg Hartle	Submission (rear-naked choke)	Undisputed MMA 1	June 18, 2011	2	4:13	Amarillo, Texas, United States	
Win	5–0	Eric Scallan	Decision (unanimous)	Global Fighting Alliance 11	February 26, 2011	3	5:00	Alexandria, Louisiana, United States	
Win	4–0	Joshua Smith	Decision (unanimous)	King of Kombat 9: Resurrection	August 20, 2010	3	5:00	Austin, Texas, United States	
Win	3–0	Jacob Ortiz	Decision (unanimous)	Supreme Warrior Championship 11: Fury	June 19, 2010	3	5:00	Frisco, Texas, United States	
Win	2–0	Chris Spicer	TKO (punches)	King of Kombat 8: The Uprising	February 27, 2010	1	1:28	Austin, Texas, United States	
Win	1–0	Ryan Delorenzo	KO (punches)	Gameness Fighting Championship 3	May 2, 2009	3	3:28	Nashville, Tennessee, United States	

== See also ==
- List of current UFC fighters
- List of male mixed martial artists
