= Brian Melancon =

American mixed martial arts fighter

- Born: May 28, 1982 (age 44); Port Neches, Texas, United States
- Height: 5 ft 8 in (1.73 m)
- Weight: 170 lb (77 kg; 12 st)
- Division: Welterweight; Lightweight
- Reach: 70 in (178 cm)
- Stance: Orthodox
- Fighting out of: Houston, Texas, United States
- Team: Paradigm Training Center
- Trainer: Ricco Rodriguez
- Rank: Purple belt in Brazilian jiu-jitsu
- Years active: 2009-2013

Mixed martial arts record
- Total: 10
- Wins: 7
- By knockout: 4
- By submission: 1
- By decision: 2
- Losses: 3
- By submission: 1
- By decision: 2

Other information
- Mixed martial arts record from Sherdog

Brian Melancon (born May 28, 1982) is an American retired mixed martial artist who competed in the UFC's Welterweight division. A professional competitor from 2009 until 2013, Melancon also competed for Strikeforce, Bellator, and Legacy FC.

== Background ==
Born in Houston but raised in Groves, Tx. Melancon played baseball, competing at Port Neches-Groves High School. Melancon then attended Lamar University and pursued a career in physical therapy, later earning a master's degree from the University of Texas Medical Branch. At the age of 24, Melancon began training in mixed martial arts to keep himself in shape.

== Mixed martial arts career ==
=== Early career ===
Melancon compiled a 5−1 record before signing with Strikeforce.

=== Strikeforce ===
Melancon made his promotional debut against Isaac Vallie-Flagg at Strikeforce: Overeem vs. Werdum. He lost the fight via split decision.

Melancon next faced Felipe Portela at Strikeforce Challengers: Larkin vs. Rossborough and won via unanimous decision.

=== Ultimate Fighting Championship ===
Melancon made his UFC debut by knocking out Seth Baczynski on July 6, 2013 at UFC 162 at the end of the first round.

Melancon faced Kelvin Gastelum on August 28, 2013 at UFC Fight Night 27, replacing an injured Paulo Thiago. He lost the fight via submission in the first round.

Melancon was expected to face Robert Whittaker on December 7, 2013 at UFC Fight Night 33. However, Melancon pulled out of the bout and subsequently announced his retirement due to renal stress as a result of frequent weight cutting. Whittaker was subsequently removed from the card as well.

== Mixed martial arts record ==
Professional record breakdown
10 matches	7 wins	3 losses
By knockout	4	0
By submission	1	1
By decision	2	2

Res.	Record	Opponent	Method	Event	Date	Round	Time	Location	Notes
Loss	7–3	Kelvin Gastelum	Submission (rear-naked choke)	UFC Fight Night: Condit vs. Kampmann 2	August 28, 2013	1	2:26	Indianapolis, Indiana, United States	
Win	7–2	Seth Baczynski	KO (punches)	UFC 162	July 6, 2013	1	4:59	Las Vegas, Nevada, United States	
Win	6–2	Felipe Portela	Decision (unanimous)	Strikeforce Challengers: Larkin vs. Rossborough	September 23, 2011	3	5:00	Las Vegas, Nevada, United States	
Loss	5–2	Isaac Vallie-Flagg	Decision (split)	Strikeforce: Overeem vs. Werdum	June 18, 2011	3	5:00	Dallas, Texas, United States	Catchweight (175 lbs) bout.
Win	5–1	Derrick Krantz	Decision (unanimous)	Legacy FC 5	January 29, 2011	3	5:00	Houston, Texas, United States	
Win	4–1	Todd Moore	TKO (punches)	Legacy FC 3	July 31, 2010	1	1:00	Houston, Texas, United States	
Loss	3–1	Adam Schindler	Decision (unanimous)	Bellator 20	May 27, 2010	3	5:00	San Antonio, Texas, United States	Catchweight (161 lbs) bout.
Win	3–0	Jarrett Jones	TKO (punches)	Steele Cage MMA 1	June 11, 2009	1	n/a	Frisco, Texas, United States	
Win	2–0	Kenneth Battle	Submission (punches)	Urban Rumble Championships 4	May 23, 2009	1	1:35	Pasadena, California, United States	
Win	1–0	Adrian Barco	TKO (punches)	Urban Rumble Championships 3	January 24, 2009	1	1:35	Pasadena, California, United States	
