= WSOF Global Championship 1: China =

World Series of Fighting MMA event in 2015

World Series of Fighting Global Championship 1: China
- Promotion: World Series of Fighting Global Championship
- Date: November 21, 2015
- Venue: Haikou Arena
- City: Haikou, China
- Attendance: 6,124

Event chronology
| World Series of Fighting 25: Lightweight Tournament | World Series of Fighting Global Championship 1: China | World Series of Fighting 26: Palmer vs. Almeida |

World Series of Fighting Global Championship 1: China was a mixed martial arts event held November 21, 2015 in Haikou, China.

== Background ==
This was the first World Series of Fighting Global Championship event, the main event was a fight between Jeremy May and Evgeny Erokhin for the inaugural WSOF GC Heavyweight Championship.

== Results ==
Fight Card
| Weight class | | | | Method | Round | Time | Notes |
|---|---|---|---|---|---|---|---|
| Heavyweight | Jeremey May | vs. | Evgeny Erokhin | No Contest (accidental eye poke) | 1 | 4:34 | (Note: For the inaugural WSOF-GC Heavyweight Championship.) |
| Lightweight | Khusein Khaliev | def. | Yoshihiro Koyama | Submission (rear-naked choke) | 1 | 4:23 |
| Lightweight | Dylan Fussel | def. | Carlo Prater | Decision (split) (29–28, 27–30, 29–28) | 3 | 5:00 |
| Featherweight | Vadim Ogar | def. | Chaitanya Gavali | Submission (armbar) | 1 | 2:29 |
| Women's Bantamweight | Jennifer Leigh Norris | def. | He Qun | Submission (rear-naked choke) | 1 | 3:45 |
| Flyweight | Alexander Keshtov | def. | Caleb Lally | Decision (unanimous) (30–27, 30–27, 29–28) | 3 | 5:00 |
| Flyweight | Yadwinder Singh | def. | Alex Schild | Decision (unanimous) (30–27, 30–27, 30–27) | 3 | 5:00 |
| Lightweight | Scott Hudson | vs. | Islam Makoev | Draw (split) (29–27, 26–30, 28–28) | 3 | 5:00 |
| Bantamweight | Hu Rige | def. | Wang Shuo | Decision (unanimous) (29–28, 29–28, 29–28) | 3 | 5:00 |
| Flyweight | Xiong Piping | def. | Han Jiaqiang | Submission (guillotine choke) | 1 | 2:16 |

== See also ==
- List of WSOF champions
- List of WSOF events
