= Todd Moore =

American mixed martial arts fighter

- Born: December 30, 1983 (age 42); Houston, Texas, United States
- Other names: Maniac
- Height: 5 ft 9 in (1.75 m)
- Weight: 170 lb (77 kg; 12 st 2 lb)
- Division: Welterweight; Lightweight
- Reach: 70.5 in (179 cm)
- Team: Third Column
- Rank: Black belt in Brazilian Jiu-Jitsu
- Years active: 2005-2014

Mixed martial arts record
- Total: 23
- Wins: 16
- By knockout: 9
- By submission: 1
- By decision: 6
- Losses: 7
- By knockout: 2
- By submission: 2
- By decision: 3

Other information
- Mixed martial arts record from Sherdog

Todd Labanes Moore (born December 30, 1983) is an American retired professional mixed martial artist. A professional competitor from 2005 until 2014, Moore fought in the WEC, Strikeforce, Titan FC, Legacy FC, and DREAM.

== Background ==
Born and raised in Houston, Texas, Moore competed in wrestling for the inaugural team at Klein Forest High School and was talented. Without including Freestyle or Greco-Roman seasons, Moore compiled an overall record of 147–52. After graduating, Moore began training in mixed martial arts at the age of 18, learning Brazilian jiu-jitsu, and would earn his black belt eight and a half years later under Vinicius Magalhaes.

== Mixed martial arts career ==
=== Early career ===
Moore compiled an undefeated amateur record of 7-0 before turning professional in 2005. Moore continued to dominate in the regional circuit, holding an undefeated record of 10-0 before being signed by the WEC.

=== WEC ===
Moore made his promotional debut at WEC 31 on December 12, 2007, against John Alessio. Moore was defeated via unanimous decision and was handed his first professional loss.

Moore made his next appearance at WEC 35 on August 3, 2008, in a Lightweight bout against Shane Roller. Moore was defeated via guillotine choke submission in the first round and was subsequently released from the promotion.

=== DREAM ===
After leaving the WEC, Moore signed with DREAM in Japan. Moore faced Japanese submission specialist Shinya Aoki at DREAM 6 on September 23, 2008, and was defeated via neck crank submission in the first round.

=== Strikeforce ===
Moore soon bounced back, however, winning three of his next four fights before being signed to a four-fight deal by Strikeforce.

Moore made his promotional debut at Strikeforce: Overeem vs. Werdum on June 18, 2011, against Mike Bronzoulis. Moore won via unanimous decision.

Moore made his next appearance against Jason High on September 23, 2011, at Strikeforce Challengers: Larkin vs. Rossborough. Moore was defeated via unanimous decision.

=== Independent promotions ===
Moore has since compiled a record of 2–1, with his most recent fight being a TKO loss to Bellator veteran Ricardo Tirloni on August 15, 2014.

== Mixed martial arts record ==
Professional record breakdown
23 matches	16 wins	7 losses
By knockout	9	2
By submission	1	2
By decision	6	3

Res.	Record	Opponent	Method	Event	Date	Round	Time	Location	Notes
Loss	16–7	E. J. Brooks	Decision (unanimous)	Titan FC 30: Brilz vs. Magalhaes	September 26, 2014	3	5:00	Cedar Park, Texas United States	Catchweight (165 lb) bout.
Loss	16–6	Ricardo Tirloni	TKO (knees)	Arena Tour 3: Moore vs. Tirloni	August 15, 2014	1	N/A	Buenos Aires, Argentina	
Win	16–5	Edwynn Jones	Submission (rear-naked choke)	FF: Fury Fighting 1	November 1, 2013	1	2:53	Humble, Texas, United States	
Win	15–5	Charles Ontiveros	TKO (punches and elbows)	LFC 18: Legacy Fighting Championship 18	March 1, 2013	2	2:01	Houston, Texas, United States	
Loss	14–5	Jason High	Decision (unanimous)	Strikeforce Challengers: Larkin vs. Rossborough	September 23, 2011	3	5:00	Las Vegas, Nevada, United States	
Win	14–4	Mike Bronzoulis	Decision (unanimous)	Strikeforce: Overeem vs. Werdum	June 18, 2011	3	5:00	Dallas, Texas, United States	
Win	13–4	Lee King	TKO (punches)	WG: Worldwide Gladiator	November 12, 2010	2	0:36	Pasadena, Texas, United States	
Loss	12–4	Brian Melancon	TKO (punches)	LP: Legacy Promotions	July 31, 2010	1	1:00	Houston, Texas, United States	Return to Welterweight.
Win	12–3	Derrick Krantz	TKO (punches)	Ascend Combat: It's On	August 8, 2009	3	2:59	Shreveport, Louisiana, United States	
Win	11–3	Rocky Johnson	Decision (unanimous)	KOK 6: Fists of Fury	April 25, 2009	3	5:00	Austin, Texas, United States	
Loss	10–3	Shinya Aoki	Submission (neck crank)	Dream 6: Middleweight Grand Prix 2008 Final Round	September 23, 2008	1	1:10	Saitama, Japan	
Loss	10–2	Shane Roller	Submission (guillotine choke)	WEC 35	August 3, 2008	1	3:00	Las Vegas, Nevada, United States	Lightweight debut.
Loss	10–1	John Alessio	Decision (unanimous)	WEC 31	December 12, 2007	3	5:00	Las Vegas, Nevada, United States	
Win	10–0	Jay Coleman	TKO (punches)	ROC 14: Tournament of Champions Finals	April 27, 2007	1	0:52	Atlantic City, New Jersey, United States	Won Ring of Combat Welterweight Tournament.
Win	9–0	Colin O'Rourke	TKO (elbows)	ROC 13: Tournament of Champions Semifinals	March 16, 2007	1	3:06	Atlantic City, New Jersey, United States	Ring of Combat Welterweight Tournament Semifinal.
Win	8–0	Jamie Toney	Decision (unanimous)	ROC 12: Tournament of Champions Quarterfinals	November 17, 2006	3	5:00	Atlantic City, New Jersey, United States	Ring of Combat Welterweight Tournament Quarterfinal.
Win	7–0	Thomas Schulte	TKO (punches)	UTS 6: Ultimate Showdown 6	June 4, 2006	3	0:10	Texas, United States	
Win	6–0	Joe Christopher	Decision (unanimous)	UTS 5: Ultimate Texas Showdown 5	April 29, 2006	3	5:00	Texas, United States	
Win	5–0	TJ Waldburger	Decision (unanimous)	REF: Renegades Extreme Fighting	March 25, 2006	3	5:00	Houston, Texas, United States	
Win	4–0	Jeremiah O'Neal	Decision	UTS 4: Ultimate Texas Showdown 4	February 25, 2006	3	5:00	Texas, United States	
Win	3–0	Jody Draper	TKO (punches)	REF: Renegades Extreme Fighting	January 21, 2006	1	2:04	Houston, Texas, United States	
Win	2–0	Frank Kirmse	TKO (punches)	REF: Renegades Extreme Fighting	November 5, 2005	3	1:51	Houston, Texas, United States	
Win	1–0	Lucas Gwaltney	TKO (doctor stoppage)	Shooto: Battle at the Ballpark 2	October 22, 2005	1	1:51	St. Louis, Missouri, United States	
