= James Head (fighter) =

American mixed martial arts fighter

- Born: February 9, 1984 (age 42); Highland, Illinois, United States
- Height: 6 ft 2 in (1.88 m)
- Weight: 170.5 lb (77.3 kg; 12.18 st)
- Division: Middleweight; Welterweight
- Reach: 73 in (185 cm)
- Fighting out of: Oklahoma City, Oklahoma
- Team: OKC Combat Sports
- Rank: Black Belt in Brazilian Jiu-Jitsu
- Years active: 2006-2013

Mixed martial arts record
- Total: 13
- Wins: 9
- By knockout: 4
- By submission: 3
- By decision: 2
- Losses: 4
- By knockout: 1
- By submission: 2
- By decision: 1

Other information
- Mixed martial arts record from Sherdog

James Head (born February 9, 1984) is an American mixed martial artist who competed in the Welterweight division of the Ultimate Fighting Championship.

== Mixed martial arts ==
James started training at Lovato's in 2008 and quickly earned a purple belt in Brazilian jiu-jitsu after winning the silver medal at the 2010 World Championships as a blue belt. Before James arrived at Lovato's, he had over six years of boxing experience, and was the Southwest Regional Amateur Champion in Texas. He has since been incorporating Lovato's Mixed Martial Arts program into his arsenal and currently holds an 8-2 pro record and a 5-0 amateur record as a MMA fighter. James has been studying the art of Muay Thai and is showing his techniques to the Lovato's Team, demonstrating how to throw a proper punch, kick, elbow and knee.

=== Early career ===
In August 2009 he suffered his first loss to Jesse Forbes resulting in a 5–1 record. He then bounced back with a TKO win over Bill Albrecht.

His biggest win to date came over UFC veteran Gerald Harris at the Tulsa Hard Rock Cafe. He won the fight via unanimous decision.

=== Ultimate Fighting Championship ===
With his win over Harris, Head earned a shot in the UFC and made his debut against undefeated Nick Ring at UFC 131. He lost the fight via submission in the third round.

Head was expected to face Mark Scanlon on November 5, 2011 at UFC 138. However, Scanlon was pulled from the bout and replaced by promotional newcomer John Maguire Then, on September 28, Head himself pulled out of the fight due to an undisclosed injury and was replaced by Justin Edwards.

Head made his welterweight debut against Papy Abedi at UFC on Fuel TV: Gustafsson vs. Silva. He won the fight at 4:33 in the first round via rear naked choke.

Head was expected to face Claude Patrick on July 21, 2012 at UFC 149. However, Patrick was forced out of the bout with an injury and replaced by Brian Ebersole. Head won via split decision (29-28, 28–29, 29-28).

Head faced Mike Pyle on December 15, 2012 at The Ultimate Fighter: Team Carwin vs. Team Nelson Finale. He lost via TKO in the first round.

Head was scheduled to fight Nick Catone on April 27, 2013 at UFC 159. During official weigh-ins, Head registered 170.25 pounds while Catone failed to make weight, coming in at 173 pounds. Catone was allowed two hours to attempt to shed weight before a second weigh-in opportunity was offered him. He did not re-weigh. Catone was subsequently fined 20% of his purse, and the bout was scheduled to proceed as a catchweight match. The day of the show, it was announced that Catone had been hospitalized for "severe dehydration", and the fight was officially pulled from the card.

Head was expected to face Bobby Voelker on August 28, 2013 at UFC Fight Night 27. However, on July 11, it was announced that Voelker had been tabbed as a replacement for Siyar Bahadurzada and would face Robbie Lawler on July 27, 2013 at UFC on Fox 8. Head instead faced Jason High at UFC Fight Night 27. He lost the bout via first round guillotine choke submission. After the loss Head was subsequently released from the UFC.

== Championships and accomplishments ==
- Ultimate Fighting Championship
  - UFC.com Awards
    - 2012: Ranked #9 Upset of the Year vs. Brian Ebersole

== Mixed martial arts record ==
Professional record breakdown
13 matches	9 wins	4 losses
By knockout	4	1
By submission	3	2
By decision	2	1

Res.	Record	Opponent	Method	Event	Date	Round	Time	Location	Notes
Loss	9–4	Jason High	Submission (guillotine choke)	UFC Fight Night: Condit vs. Kampmann 2	August 28, 2013	1	1:41	Indianapolis, Indiana, United States	
Loss	9–3	Mike Pyle	TKO (knee and punches)	The Ultimate Fighter 16 Finale	December 15, 2012	1	1:55	Las Vegas, Nevada, United States	
Win	9–2	Brian Ebersole	Decision (split)	UFC 149	July 21, 2012	3	5:00	Calgary, Alberta, Canada	
Win	8–2	Papy Abedi	Submission (rear-naked choke)	UFC on Fuel TV: Gustafsson vs. Silva	April 14, 2012	1	4:33	Stockholm, Sweden	Welterweight debut.
Loss	7–2	Nick Ring	Submission (rear-naked choke)	UFC 131	June 11, 2011	3	3:33	Vancouver, British Columbia, Canada	
Win	7–1	Gerald Harris	Decision (unanimous)	Xtreme Fight Night: Harris vs. Head	February 25, 2011	3	5:00	Tulsa, Oklahoma, United States	
Win	6–1	Bill Albrecht	TKO (punches)	Bricktown Brawl 5	June 25, 2010	1	1:46	Oklahoma City, Oklahoma, United States	
Loss	5–1	Jesse Forbes	Decision (unanimous)	PB MMA : Live Saturday Night	August 22, 2009	3	5:00	Springdale, Arkansas, United States	
Win	5–0	Chris Henning	TKO (punches)	TAP Entertainment: Ultimate Fight Night 3	September 27, 2008	1	2:20	Muskogee, Oklahoma, United States	
Win	4–0	Lee McKibbin	Submission (triangle choke)	CW 9: Max Extreme Fighting	March 9, 2008	2	N/A	Belfast, Northern Ireland	
Win	3–0	Eric Bradley	TKO (punches)	Masters of the Cage 16	September 28, 2007	2	1:47	Oklahoma City, Oklahoma, United States	
Win	2–0	Ruben Escamilla	Submission	Masters of the Cage 14	June 26, 2007	1	2:12	Oklahoma City, Oklahoma, United States	
Win	1–0	Chance Fine	TKO (punches)	Masters of the Cage 7	December 2, 2006	1	1:02	Oklahoma City, Oklahoma, United States	
