= World Series of Fighting 31: Ivanov vs. Copeland =

World Series of Fighting MMA event in 2016

- Promotion: World Series of Fighting
- Date: June 17, 2016
- Venue: Foxwoods Resort Casino
- City: Mashantucket, Connecticut

Event chronology
World Series of Fighting 30: Branch vs. Starks	World Series of Fighting 31: Ivanov vs. Copeland	World Series of Fighting Global Championship 3: Philippines

World Series of Fighting 31: Ivanov vs. Copeland was a mixed martial arts event held on June 17, 2016 at the Foxwoods Resort Casino in Mashantucket, Connecticut.

== Background ==
The event was headlined by a WSOF Heavyweight Championship fight between champion Blagoy Ivanov and Josh Copeland. The co-main event was a battle between UFC veterans Jason High and Mike Ricci.

== Results ==
Main Card (NBCSN)
Weight class				Method	Round	Time	Notes
Heavyweight	Blagoy Ivanov (c)	def.	Josh Copeland	Decision (unanimous) (49–46, 49–46, 48–47)	5	5:00	(Note: For the WSOF Heavyweight Championship.)
Lightweight	Jason High	def.	Mike Ricci	TKO (punches)	2	4:08
Middleweight	John Howard	def.	Michael Arrant	Decision (unanimous) (30–27, 30–27, 30–27)	3	5:00
Featherweight	Sheymon Moraes	def.	Luis Palomino	Decision (unanimous) (29–28, 29–28, 29–28)	3	5:00
Middleweight	Phil Hawes	def.	Joshua Key	TKO (elbows)	1	2:52
Preliminary Card (WSOF.com)
Lightweight	Devin Powell	def.	Tom Marcellino	Decision (split) (27–30, 29–28, 29–28)	3	5:00
Heavyweight	Justin Willis	def.	Juliano Coutinho	TKO (punches)	2	0:30
Heavyweight	Tyler King	def.	Lorenzo Hood	Submission (guillotine choke)	2	4:20
Lightweight	Bruce Boyington	def.	Saul Almeida	Decision (split) (27–30, 29–28, 29–28)	3	5:00
Lightweight	Marcus Surin	def.	Christian Torres	TKO (knees)	2	2:51

== See also ==
- List of WSOF events
- List of WSOF champions
