= Papy Abedi =

Congolese mixed martial arts fighter

- Born: Mwimbi Papy Abedi; June 30, 1978 (age 48); Kinshasa, Zaire (now Democratic Republic of the Congo)
- Other names: Makambo
- Nationality: Congolese; Swedish
- Height: 5 ft 11 in (1.80 m)
- Weight: 185 lb (84 kg; 13.2 st)
- Division: Middleweight; Welterweight
- Reach: 74 in (188 cm)
- Stance: Southpaw
- Fighting out of: Stockholm, Sweden
- Team: Allstars Training Center; Alliance MMA; Hilti NHB
- Rank: Black belt in Judo; Purple belt in Brazilian Jiu-Jitsu
- Years active: 2006–2017

Mixed martial arts record
- Total: 14
- Wins: 10
- By knockout: 6
- By submission: 2
- By decision: 2
- Losses: 4
- By knockout: 2
- By submission: 2

Other information
- Mixed martial arts record from Sherdog

Mwimbi Papy Abedi (born June 30, 1978) is a Congolese-Swedish mixed martial artist who last competed in 2017. A professional competitor since 2006, he formerly fought for the UFC.

== Biography ==
Abedi was born in 1978 in Kinshasa, Zaire (now Democratic Republic of the Congo), where he grew up. He was given the nickname "Makambo" by the elders, which in Lingala means "trouble", because whenever there was a fight or trouble, he was the first at the scene. He later moved to France and Belgium, before moving to Sweden in 1997. He started training in judo at 7 years of age.

== Mixed martial arts career ==
Abedi made his professional MMA debut in December 2006. He produced finishes in all but one of his fights, including five knockouts and two submissions.
At this point of his career multiple major MMA media outlets described him as one of the best middleweights in the European circuit and predicted that he had potential for a great future in MMA.

=== Ultimate Fighting Championship ===
In June 2011, Papy signed a four-fight deal with the Ultimate Fighting Championship, and it was announced that he would drop down to welterweight for his UFC debut.

Abedi made his UFC debut against former title challenger Thiago Alves on November 5, 2011, at UFC 138. Abedi was badly hurt by a straight right hand from Alves that knocked him down midway through the first round and after delivering a barrage of punches and elbows that cut Abedi open, Alves took Abedi's back and finished the fight via submission due to a rear naked choke, giving Abedi his first professional loss. Although Abedi was given credit for stepping up against a top 10-fighter in his UFC debut.

Abedi faced James Head on April 14, 2012, at UFC on Fuel TV: Gustafsson vs. Silva. Late in the opening round Head stunned Abedi with a short elbow from the clinch followed by a barrage of punches that knocked Abedi down, Head followed Papy to the mat and finished the fight with a rear naked choke.

Abedi was briefly linked to a bout with Rick Story on June 22, 2012, at UFC on FX: Maynard vs. Guida, replacing an injured Rich Attonito However, Abedi was forced out of the bout with an injury and replaced by promotional newcomer Brock Jardine.

In his third fight with the promotion, Abedi faced fellow Swedish fighter Besam Yousef at UFC on Fuel TV 9. He won the back-and-forth fight via split decision, earning his first UFC win.

Abedi next faced Dylan Andrews in his return to middleweight on August 28, 2013, at UFC Fight Night 27. Despite controlling and winning the first two rounds, Abedi lost via knockout in the third round. After the loss Abedi was subsequently released from the UFC.

=== Post UFC ===
After his run in the UFC, Abedi went back to fight in Sweden. He was expected to face Daniel Acácio for the Superior Challenge welterweight title on May 3, 2014, at Superior Challenge 10, but pulled out with an injury and was subsequently replaced by Alan Carlos.

Abedi made his return, first expected at April 9, 2016 but later postponed, from what was an over three-year layoff, to face Bruno Carvalho in a middleweight bout on October 8, 2016, at Superior Challenge 14. He won the fight by TKO in the first round.

He faced Dylan Andrews, in a rematch of their 2013 UFC-bout, for the Superior Challenge Middleweight Championship on April 1, 2017, at Superior Challenge 15. He lost the fight by knockout via head kick in the 2nd round.

== Mixed martial arts record ==
Professional record breakdown
14 matches	10 wins	4 losses
By knockout	6	2
By submission	2	2
By decision	2	0

Res.	Record	Opponent	Method	Event	Date	Round	Time	Location	Notes
Loss	10–4	Dylan Andrews	KO (head kick)	Superior Challenge 15	April 1, 2017	2	4:16	Stockholm, Sweden	For the SC Middleweight Championship
Win	10–3	Bruno Carvalho	TKO (punches)	Superior Challenge 14	October 8, 2016	1	4:01	Stockholm, Sweden	
Loss	9–3	Dylan Andrews	KO (punches)	UFC Fight Night: Condit vs. Kampmann 2	August 28, 2013	3	1:32	Indianapolis, Indiana, United States	Return to Middleweight.
Win	9–2	Besam Yousef	Decision (split)	UFC on Fuel TV: Mousasi vs. Latifi	April 6, 2013	3	5:00	Stockholm, Sweden	
Loss	8–2	James Head	Submission (rear-naked choke)	UFC on Fuel TV: Gustafsson vs. Silva	April 14, 2012	1	4:33	Stockholm, Sweden	
Loss	8–1	Thiago Alves	Submission (rear-naked choke)	UFC 138	November 5, 2011	1	3:32	Birmingham, England	Welterweight debut.
Win	8–0	Nathan Schouteren	Submission (guillotine choke)	Superior Challenge 6	October 29, 2010	1	3:22	Stockholm, Sweden	
Win	7–0	Bohumil Lungrik	TKO (punches)	Hell Cage 5	March 28, 2010	1	2:53	Prague, Czech Republic	
Win	6–0	Nelton Pontes	TKO (punches)	Bushido Challenge 1: War of the Warriors	December 13, 2009	1	3:17	Norwich, Norfolk, England	
Win	5–0	Alan Carlos	TKO (punches)	Superior Challenge 3	May 30, 2009	2	1:56	Stockholm, Sweden	
Win	4–0	Timur Akbulut	Submission (arm-triangle choke)	Fight Fiesta de Luxe: Unstoppable	April 5, 2008	1	N/A	Hollerich, Luxembourg	
Win	3–0	Aldric Cassata	TKO (knees)	Chaos Fighting Championships 1	December 1, 2007	2	N/A	Derry, Northern Ireland	
Win	2–0	Juha Kaki	Decision (unanimous)	Shooto Finland: Bloodbath	May 12, 2007	2	5:00	Vantaa, Finland	
Win	1–0	Mikael Pastor	TKO (knee to the body & punches)	Travelfight Arena	December 16, 2006	2	2:24	Uppsala, Sweden	
