= Strikeforce: Overeem vs. Werdum =

Strikeforce mixed martial arts event in 2011

- The poster for Strikeforce: Overeem vs. Werdum
- Promotion: Strikeforce
- Date: June 18, 2011
- Venue: American Airlines Center
- City: Dallas, Texas, United States
- Attendance: 7,639
- Total gate: $543,060

Event chronology
Strikeforce: Diaz vs. Daley	Strikeforce: Overeem vs. Werdum	Strikeforce: Fedor vs. Henderson

Strikeforce: Overeem vs. Werdum, was a mixed martial arts event held by Strikeforce. The event took place on June 18, 2011 at the American Airlines Center in Dallas, Texas, United States. The main card aired on Showtime while the preliminary card aired on HDNet.

== Background ==
Originally scheduled for April 9, this event hosted the two remaining quarter-final fights in the Strikeforce Heavyweight Grand Prix tournament.

Muhammed Lawal was expected to fight Ovince St. Preux at this event, but the bout was later cancelled.

Scott Smith had indicated that he hoped to fight at this event, however he instead fought Tarec Saffiedine at Strikeforce: Fedor vs. Henderson the following month.

Shane Del Rosario was scheduled to face Daniel Cormier in a Heavyweight Grand Prix reserve bout. However, Del Rosario had to pull out of the bout after a car accident in early May. Jeff Monson stepped in as a replacement to face Cormier in the reserve bout. After his victory, Cormier was selected to replace Alistair Overeem in the tournament semifinals following his removal from the tournament in July 2011.

Amanda Nunes was scheduled to face Julie Kedzie at this event, but a hairline fracture in her foot forced Nunes off the card.

Gina Carano was scheduled to make her Strikeforce return against Sarah D'Alelio. While medically approved by the Texas Department of Licensing and Regulation, Carano opted to pull out of the fight on the advice of her own doctor.

Brian Melancon weighed in 4 pounds over the welterweight non-title bout allowance of 171 lb.

== Results ==
Main card (Showtime)
Weight class				Method	Round	Time	Notes
Heavyweight	Alistair Overeem	def.	Fabrício Werdum	Decision (unanimous) (30–27, 30–27, 29–28)	3	5:00	(Note: Strikeforce Heavyweight Grand Prix Quarterfinal)
Heavyweight	Josh Barnett	def.	Brett Rogers	Submission (arm triangle choke)	2	1:17	(Note: Strikeforce Heavyweight Grand Prix Quarterfinal)
Lightweight	Jorge Masvidal	def.	K. J. Noons	Decision (unanimous) (30–27, 30–27, 30–27)	3	5:00
Heavyweight	Daniel Cormier	def.	Jeff Monson	Decision (unanimous) (30–27, 30–27, 30–27)	3	5:00
Heavyweight	Chad Griggs	def.	Valentijn Overeem	TKO (Submission to strikes)	1	2:08
Preliminary card (HDNet)
Lightweight	Gesias Cavalcante	vs.	Justin Wilcox	No Contest (accidental eye poke)	2	0:31	(Note: Wilcox and Cavalcante ended following an accidental eye poke at 0:31 in round 2.)
Lightweight	Conor Heun	def.	Magno Almeida	Decision (unanimous) (29–28, 29–28, 29–28)	3	5:00
Catchweight (180 lbs)	Nah-Shon Burrell	def.	Joe Ray	Decision (unanimous) (29–28, 29–28, 29–28)	3	5:00
Catchweight (175 lbs)	Isaac Vallie-Flagg	def.	Brian Melancon	Decision (split) (28–29, 29–28, 29–28)	3	5:00
Postliminary card
Welterweight	Todd Moore	def.	Mike Bronzoulis	Decision (unanimous) (29–28, 29–28, 29–28)	3	5:00	(Note: This bout was contested after the main card due to time constraints.)

== Heavyweight Grand Prix Bracket ==
Quarter-finals
Fedor Emelianenko	RD 2
Antônio Silva	TKO
Alistair Overeem	RD 3
Fabrício Werdum	UD
Andrei Arlovski	RD 1
Sergei Kharitonov	KO
Josh Barnett	RD 2
Brett Rogers	SUB

Semi-finals
Antônio Silva	RD 1
Daniel Cormier**	KO
Sergei Kharitonov	RD 1
Josh Barnett	SUB

Final
Daniel Cormier	RD 5
Josh Barnett	UD

** = Replacement
