= Derrick Krantz =

American mixed martial artist

- Born: January 13, 1988 (age 38); Indio, California, United States
- Nickname: D-Rock
- Height: 5 ft 10 in (1.78 m)
- Weight: 170 lb (77 kg; 12 st 2 lb)
- Division: Middleweight; Welterweight; Lightweight
- Reach: 72.0 in (183 cm)
- Fighting out of: Marshall, Texas, United States
- Team: Team 515; Longview MMA
- Rank: Black belt in Brazilian Jiu-Jitsu
- Years active: 2008–present

Mixed martial arts record
- Total: 38
- Wins: 26
- By knockout: 11
- By submission: 11
- By decision: 4
- Losses: 12
- By knockout: 3
- By submission: 5
- By decision: 4

Other information
- Mixed martial arts record from Sherdog

Derrick Krantz (born January 13, 1988) is an American professional mixed martial artist who most recently competed in the Welterweight division of the Ultimate Fighting Championship (UFC). A professional competitor since 2008, he has also competed for Bellator MMA and Legacy Fighting Alliance.

== Background ==
Krantz moved to Texas at age 16 and began his martial arts career training in Kung Fu to keep him preoccupied and out of trouble.

== Mixed martial arts career ==
=== Early career ===
Krantz compiled an amateur record of 12-6-1 before he made his professional debut on July 18, 2008 vs. Jay Hall, winning via first-round TKO. He amassed an 11-5 record on the regional circuit, competing against UFC veterans Dustin Poirier and Rich Clementi before making his Bellator MMA debut in 2012.

=== Bellator MMA ===
Krantz made his Bellator MMA debut on March 16, 2012 at Bellator 61 vs. Eric Scallan, winning via first-round submission. His next bout was against future Bellator Welterweight Champion Andrey Koreshkov at Bellator 69, losing via third-round TKO.

=== Legacy FC/Legacy Fighting Alliance ===
After a pair of victories at Legacy FC 14 and Legacy FC 16, Krantz moved down to Lightweight to face former UFC Welterweight title contender Jorge Patino for the Legacy Lightweight Championship at Legacy FC 18, losing via second-round submission. He received another title shot at Legacy FC 43, this time for the vacant Legacy Welterweight Championship on July 17, 2015 vs. UFC veteran Brock Larson, winning via third-round knockout. He lost the title via first-round submission against Alex Morono at Legacy FC 49.

Krantz competed for the vacant Legacy Fighting Alliance Welterweight Championship at LFA 12 on May 19, 2017 vs. Ben Neumann, winning via second-round TKO. He lost the title via split decision against James Nakashima at LFA 23.

=== Ultimate Fighting Championship ===
Following a four-fight winning streak, Krantz was named a short-notice replacement for Neil Magny at UFC Fight Night: dos Anjos vs. Lee on May 18, 2019, against Vicente Luque. He lost the fight via first-round TKO.

Krantz faced Song Kenan on August 31, 2019, at UFC Fight Night 157. He lost the fight via unanimous decision, and was subsequently released from the promotion.

== Championships and accomplishments ==
=== Mixed martial arts ===
- Legacy Fighting Championship
  - Legacy FC Welterweight Championship (One time)
- Legacy Fighting Alliance
  - LFA Welterweight Championship (One time, first)

== Mixed martial arts record ==
Professional record breakdown
38 matches	26 wins	12 losses
By knockout	11	3
By submission	11	5
By decision	4	4

Res.	Record	Opponent	Method	Event	Date	Round	Time	Location	Notes
Win	26–12	Chauncey Foxworth	Decision (unanimous)	AKA 18	October 29, 2021	5	5:00	Bossier City, Louisiana, United States	Defended the AKA Middleweight Championship.
Win	25–12	Nolan Norwood	KO (punches)	AKA 14	April 23, 2021	1	2:17	Bossier City, Louisiana, United States	Return to Middleweight. Won the vacant AKA Middleweight Championship.
Loss	24–12	Song Kenan	Decision (unanimous)	UFC Fight Night: Andrade vs. Zhang	August 31, 2019	3	5:00	Shenzhen, China	
Loss	24–11	Vicente Luque	TKO (punches)	UFC Fight Night: dos Anjos vs. Lee	May 18, 2019	1	3:52	Rochester, New York, United States	
Win	24–10	Justin Patterson	KO (punches)	LFA 63	March 29, 2019	1	2:23	Belton, Texas, United States	Return to Welterweight.
Win	23–10	Hayward Charles	TKO (punches)	AKA: Rite of Passage 5	October 27, 2018	2	4:47	Bossier City, Louisiana, United States	Middleweight debut.
Win	22–10	Kassius Holdorf	Decision (split)	LFA 42	June 8, 2018	3	5:00	Branson, Missouri, United States	
Win	21–10	Artenas Young	Decision (unanimous)	AKA: Rite of Passage 3	March 16, 2018	3	5:00	Bossier City, Louisiana, United States	
Loss	20–10	James Nakashima	Decision (split)	LFA 23	September 22, 2017	5	5:00	Bossier City, Louisiana, United States	Lost the LFA Welterweight Championship.
Win	20–9	Ben Neumann	TKO (punches)	LFA 12	May 19, 2017	2	0:55	Prior Lake, Minnesota, United States	Won the inaugural LFA Welterweight Championship.
Win	19–9	Hayward Charles	Decision (unanimous)	LFA 4	February 17, 2017	3	5:00	Bossier City, Louisiana, United States	
Win	18–9	Dave Burrow	Submission (rear-naked choke)	Legacy FC 57	July 1, 2016	1	4:22	Bossier City, Louisiana, United States	
Loss	17–9	Alex Morono	Submission (guillotine choke)	Legacy FC 49	December 4, 2015	1	4:29	Bossier City, Louisiana, United States	Lost the Legacy FC Welterweight Championship.
Win	17–8	Brock Larson	KO (punches)	Legacy FC 43	July 17, 2015	3	2:38	Hinckley, Minnesota, United States	Won the Legacy FC Welterweight Championship.
Win	16–8	Daniel Roberts	Submission (Von Flue choke)	Legacy FC 35	September 26, 2014	1	2:49	Tulsa, Oklahoma, United States	
Win	15–8	Kyle Bradley	Submission (rear-naked choke)	Legacy FC 32	June 20, 2014	1	3:44	Bossier City, Louisiana, United States	Return to Welterweight.
Loss	14–8	Derek Campos	Submission (rear-naked choke)	Ascent Combat: Mayhem 3	May 11, 2013	3	4:15	Shreveport, Louisiana, United States	Catchweight (160 lbs) bout.
Loss	14–7	Jorge Patino	Submission (guillotine choke)	Legacy FC 18	March 1, 2013	2	3:07	Houston, Texas, United States	Lightweight debut. For the Legacy FC Lightweight Championship.
Win	14–6	Charles Byrd	Submission (rear-naked choke)	Legacy FC 16	December 14, 2012	1	3:02	Dallas, Texas, United States	Catchweight (172 lbs) bout.
Win	13–6	Brandon Farran	Submission (rear-naked choke)	Legacy FC 14	September 14, 2012	1	1:11	Houston, Texas, United States	
Loss	12–6	Andrey Koreshkov	TKO (knees and punches)	Bellator 69	May 18, 2012	3	0:51	Lake Charles, Louisiana, United States	
Win	12–5	Eric Scallan	Technical Submission (brabo choke)	Bellator 61	March 16, 2012	1	3:01	Bossier City, Louisiana, United States	
Loss	11–5	Sean Spencer	Decision (unanimous)	Fight Game: Premier Event	December 2, 2011	3	5:00	Frisco, Texas, United States	
Loss	11–4	Brian Melancon	Decision (unanimous)	Legacy FC 5	January 29, 2011	3	5:00	Houston, Texas, United States	
Win	11–3	Ryan Larson	Submission (rear-naked choke)	King of Kombat 9	August 20, 2010	1	4:28	Austin, Texas, United States	
Win	10–3	Rocky Long	Submission (rear-naked choke)	Ascent Combat: The Beginning	April 3, 2010	1	3:59	Shreveport, Louisiana, United States	
Loss	9–3	Dustin Poirier	Submission (armbar)	USA MMA: Night of Champions 2	March 6, 2010	2	3:35	Lafayette, Louisiana, United States	
Loss	9–2	Rich Clementi	Submission (armbar)	Team 3:16 MMA: Season's Beatings	December 12, 2009	1	4:54	Shreveport, Louisiana, United States	
Win	9–1	Mike Clifton	Submission	Steele Cage 2	November 7, 2009	1	1:46	Frisco, Texas, United States	
Loss	8–1	Todd Moore	TKO (punches)	Ascent Combat: It's On	August 8, 2009	3	2:59	Shreveport, Louisiana, United States	
Win	8–0	Donald Wallace	TKO (punches)	Cajun FC	June 26, 2009	1	3:27	Lafayette, Louisiana, United States	
Win	7–0	Adam Schindler	TKO (punches)	Ascent Combat: Best of the Best Tournament	June 6, 2009	2	1:14	Shreveport, Louisiana, United States	
Win	6–0	Jason Wright	Submission (rear-naked choke)	3:16 Productions: Unstoppable	April 3, 2009	1	2:44	Shreveport, Louisiana, United States	
Win	5–0	Aaron Hall	Submission (arm-triangle choke)	Cage Kings: Total Domination	March 20, 2009	1	2:46	Bossier City, Louisiana, United States	
Win	4–0	Cleo Wright	TKO (punches)	Reality Check	January 31, 2009	1	1:24	Shreveport, Louisiana, United States	
Win	3–0	Chance Burke	TKO (punches)	Cage Kings: Destruction at the Dome	October 10, 2008	1	1:39	Bossier City, Louisiana, United States	
Win	2–0	Brandon Jinnies	TKO	Louisiana FC 2	August 23, 2008	1	0:00	Baton Rouge, Louisiana, United States	
Win	1–0	Jay Hall	TKO (punches)	Cage Kings	July 18, 2008	1	0:56	Bossier City, Louisiana, United States	

== See also ==
- List of current UFC fighters
- List of male mixed martial artists
