= Isaac Vallie-Flagg =

American mixed martial arts fighter

- Born: April 8, 1978 (age 48); Ypsilanti, Michigan, United States
- Height: 5 ft 8 in (1.73 m)
- Weight: 156 lb (71 kg; 11 st 2 lb)
- Division: Lightweight; Welterweight
- Reach: 70.0 in (178 cm)
- Fighting out of: Albuquerque, New Mexico, United States
- Team: Jackson's Submission Fighting
- Rank: Purple belt in Brazilian Jiu-Jitsu
- Years active: 2003–present

Mixed martial arts record
- Total: 24
- Wins: 16
- By knockout: 5
- By submission: 5
- By decision: 6
- Losses: 7
- By submission: 3
- By decision: 3
- By disqualification: 1
- Draws: 1

Other information
- Mixed martial arts record from Sherdog

Isaac Vallie-Flagg (born April 8, 1978) is an American mixed martial artist, who formerly competed in the Lightweight division of the Ultimate Fighting Championship. A professional competitor since 2003, he has also formerly competed in Strikeforce, Titan FC, and King of the Cage.

== Background ==
Vallie-Flagg is from Ann Arbor, Michigan, and attended Community High School. Troubled growing up, Vallie-Flagg was not active in sports apart from dabbling with lacrosse. After viewing a UFC event, Vallie-Flagg began training in mixed martial arts and Brazilian jiu-jitsu.

== Mixed martial arts career ==
=== Strikeforce ===
Vallie-Flagg made his Strikeforce debut against Brian Melancon at Strikeforce: Overeem vs. Werdum winning the bout via split decision.

Vallie-Flagg was scheduled to face Bobby Green at Strikeforce Challengers: Britt vs. Sayers, but he pulled out of the bout on November 11, 2011.

Vallie-Flagg next faced Gesias Cavalcante at Strikeforce: Barnett vs. Cormier. He won the fight via split decision.

Vallie-Flagg was scheduled to face Adriano Martins at Strikeforce: Melendez vs. Healy. However, on September 23, 2012, it was announced that the event was cancelled due to an injury to headliner Gilbert Melendez.

=== Ultimate Fighting Championship ===
Following the dissolution of Strikeforce, Vallie-Flagg was brought over to the UFC. In his debut, he faced Yves Edwards on February 2, 2013, at UFC 156. He won the fight split decision.

Vallie-Flagg was expected to face Sam Stout on June 15, 2013, at UFC 161. However, Vallie-Flagg was forced out with a back injury and was replaced by James Krause.

Vallie-Flagg faced Elias Silvério on January 15, 2014, at UFC Fight Night 35. He lost the fight via unanimous decision.

Vallie-Flagg was briefly linked to a bout with Danny Castillo on April 26, 2014, at UFC 172. However, the UFC removed Vallie-Flagg from the bout in favor of a match up with Takanori Gomi. He lost the fight via unanimous decision. Despite the loss on the scorecards, Vallie-Flagg was awarded his first Fight of the Night bonus award for the bout.

Vallie-Flagg faced Matt Wiman at UFC Fight Night 57 on November 22, 2014. He lost the back-and-forth fight via unanimous decision, and was subsequently released from the promotion shortly after.

== Personal life ==
Vallie-Flagg has been vocal about his drug addiction, with which he has struggled since a teenager. Eventually in 2018, he was arrested on suspicion of burglary in Albuquerque, New Mexico, carrying drugs and multiple weapons. After he was released from the jail, he sought out for help and has been sober since 2018.

== Championships and accomplishments ==
=== Mixed martial arts ===
- Ultimate Fighting Championship
  - Fight of the Night (One time) vs. Takanori Gomi

== Mixed martial arts record ==
Professional record breakdown
24 matches	16 wins	7 losses
By knockout	5	0
By submission	5	3
By decision	6	3
By disqualification	0	1
Draws	1	

Res.	Record	Opponent	Method	Event	Date	Round	Time	Location	Notes
Win	16–7–1	Jonathan Gary	Submission (rear-naked choke)	Fresquez Productions: Rumble on Route 66 2	August 6, 2016	1	4:15	Albuquerque, New Mexico, United States	
Loss	15–7–1	Jason Witt	DQ (illegal knee)	Titan FC 34	July 18, 2015	3	1:54	Kansas City, Missouri, United States	
Win	15–6–1	Travis Coyle	Submission (knee and punches)	Jackson's MMA Series XV	June 6, 2015	1	3:52	Santa Fe, New Mexico, United States	
Loss	14–6–1	Matt Wiman	Decision (unanimous)	UFC Fight Night: Edgar vs. Swanson	November 22, 2014	3	5:00	Austin, Texas, United States	
Loss	14–5–1	Takanori Gomi	Decision (unanimous)	UFC 172	April 26, 2014	3	5:00	Baltimore, Maryland, United States	Fight of the Night.
Loss	14–4–1	Elias Silvério	Decision (unanimous)	UFC Fight Night: Rockhold vs. Philippou	January 15, 2014	3	5:00	Duluth, Georgia, United States	
Win	14–3–1	Yves Edwards	Decision (split)	UFC 156	February 2, 2013	3	5:00	Las Vegas, Nevada, United States	
Win	13–3–1	Gesias Cavalcante	Decision (split)	Strikeforce: Barnett vs. Cormier	May 19, 2012	3	5:00	San Jose, California, United States	Lightweight debut.
Win	12–3–1	Brian Melancon	Decision (split)	Strikeforce: Overeem vs. Werdum	June 18, 2011	3	5:00	Dallas, Texas, United States	Catchweight (175 lb) bout.
Win	11–3–1	Danny Rodriguez	TKO (knee & punches)	Jackson's MMA Series 4	April 9, 2011	2	3:28	Albuquerque, New Mexico, United States	
Win	10–3–1	Alejandro Villalobos	KO (punches)	Nemesis Fighting: MMA Global Invasion	December 11, 2010	3	N/A	Punta Cana, Dominican Republic	
Draw	9–3–1	Ken Jackson	Draw	C3 Fights: Slammin Jammin Weekend 5	August 7, 2010	3	5:00	Newkirk, Oklahoma, United States	
Win	9–3	Robert Simmons	TKO (punches)	KOTC: Native Warriors	March 6, 2010	1	2:48	Santa Fe, New Mexico, United States	
Win	8–3	Mike Barreras	Decision (unanimous)	DCMMAS: Duke City MMA Series 2	July 25, 2009	3	5:00	Albuquerque, New Mexico, United States	
Win	7–3	Anselmo Martinez	Decision (unanimous)	Gods of War	January 24, 2009	3	5:00	Las Cruces, New Mexico, United States	
Win	6–3	Adrian Gutierrez	TKO (punches)	SCA: Duke City Bike and Brawl 2	August 23, 2008	2	N/A	Albuquerque, New Mexico, United States	
Win	5–3	Brad Nordquist	TKO (punches)	KOTC: Badlands	July 12, 2008	2	0:50	Albuquerque, New Mexico, United States	
Win	4–3	Abel Vargas	Submission (rear-naked choke)	KOTC: Hierarchy	October 13, 2007	1	2:01	Albuquerque, New Mexico, United States	
Loss	3–3	Rudy Bears	Submission (rear-naked choke)	FW 15: Rumble at Rt. 66 Casino	July 28, 2007	1	4:00	Albuquerque, New Mexico, United States	
Win	3–2	Ashton Castro	Submission (punches)	YTYT: Ground Um and Pound Um	April 21, 2007	1	4:15	Kona, Hawaii, United States	
Loss	2–2	Patrick Reeves	Submission (armbar)	Knuckle Up Productions: Fight Night	August 4, 2006	1	1:07	Santa Fe, New Mexico, United States	
Win	2–1	Eric Regan	Submission (rear-naked choke)	Knuckle Up Productions: Slugfest	May 19, 2006	1	1:23	Espanola, New Mexico, United States	
Win	1–1	Danny Wren	Decision (unanimous)	KOTC 35: Acoma	February 28, 2004	2	5:00	Acoma, New Mexico, United States	
Loss	0–1	Ben Schilsler	Submission (armbar)	KOTC 26: Gladiator Challenge	August 3, 2003	1	0:29	Acoma, New Mexico, United States	

== Bare knuckle record ==
Professional record breakdown
4 matches	3 wins	1 loss
By knockout	3	1

Res.	Record	Opponent	Method	Event	Date	Round	Time	Location	Notes
Loss	3–1	Luis Palomino	KO (punches)	BKFC 11	July 24, 2020	1	0:45	Oxford, Mississippi, United States	Super Welterweight Tournament Final
Win	3–0	Melvin Guillard	TKO (hand injury)	BKFC 7	August 10, 2019	3	2:00	Biloxi, Mississippi, United States	Guillard was forced to retire after round three due to an injury to his right hand.
Win	2–0	Randy Hedderick	TKO (broken hand)	BKFC 5	April 6, 2019	3	1:22	Biloxi, Mississippi, United States	
Win	1–0	Cory Simpson	KO (punches)	World Bare Knuckle Fighting Federation	November 9, 2018	2	1:20	Casper, Wyoming, United States	
