= World Series of Fighting 25: Lightweight Tournament =

World Series of Fighting MMA event in 2015

- Promotion: World Series of Fighting
- Date: November 20, 2015
- Venue: Comerica Theatre
- City: Phoenix, Arizona, United States
- Attendance: 3,500

Event chronology
World Series of Fighting 24: Fitch vs. Okami	World Series of Fighting 25: Lightweight Tournament	World Series of Fighting Global Championship 1: China

World Series of Fighting 25: Lightweight Tournament was a mixed martial arts event held November 20, 2015 in Phoenix, Arizona, United States. This event aired on NBCSN in the U.S and on Fight Network in Canada.

== Background ==
This event featured a one night only 8 Man Lightweight tournament to crown a number one contender for the WSOF Lightweight Championship.

On August 24, 2015, it was announced that The field of eight included Islam Mamedov, Mike Ricci, Joáo Zeferino, Rich Patishnock, Jorge Patino, Brian Cobb, Brian Foster and Luis Palomino. Joe Condon replaced Brian Cobb.

== Results ==
Main card (NBC Sports)
Weight class				Method	Round	Time	Notes
Lightweight	Brian Foster	def.	João Zeferino	KO (punches)	2	4:51	(Note: WSOF Lightweight Tournament Final.)
Lightweight	Jason High	def.	Estevan Payan	KO (head kick and punches)	2	0:47
Lightweight	Brian Foster	def.	Luis Palomino	TKO (punches)	2	4:19	(Note: WSOF Lightweight Tournament Semifinal.)
Lightweight	João Zeferino	def.	Jorge Patino	Submission (heel hook)	1	1:24	(Note: WSOF Lightweight Tournament Semifinal.)
Preliminary Card (WSOF.com)
Bantamweight	Joseph Barajas	def.	Erik Villalobos	TKO (punches)	3	4:06
Catchweight (165lbs)	Roberto Yong	def.	Jimmy Scully	TKO (punches)	1	1:11
Lightweight	Luis Palomino	def.	Rich Patishnock	TKO (punches)	1	4:55	(Note: WSOF Lightweight Tournament Quarterfinal.)
Lightweight	João Zeferino	def.	Brian Foster	Submission (heel hook)	1	1:46	(Note: WSOF Lightweight Tournament Quarterfinal.)
Lightweight	Mike Ricci	def.	Joe Condon	KO (head kick)	1	2:41	(Note: WSOF Lightweight Tournament Quarterfinal.)
Lightweight	Islam Mamedov	def.	Jorge Patino	Decision (unanimous) (20–17, 20–17, 20–17)	2	5:00	(Note: WSOF Lightweight Tournament Quarterfinal.)
Lightweight	Ramil Mustapayev	def.	LaRue Burley	Decision (unanimous) (30–27, 30–27, 30–27)	3	5:00	(Note: WSOF Lightweight Tournament Reserve bout.)

=== Tournament bracket ===
Quarterfinals
Islam Mamedov	DEC
Jorge Patino	2
Brian Foster	1
Joáo Zeferino	SUB
Luis Palomino	KO
Rich Patishnock	1
Mike Ricci	KO
Joe Condon	1

Semifinals
Jorge Patino	1
Joáo Zeferino	SUB
Luis Palomino	2
Brian Foster	TKO

Final
Joáo Zeferino	2
Brian Foster	KO

- Patino fought as a replacement for Mamedov due to a torn ACL.
- Foster fought as a replacement for Ricci due to an injured hip.

== See also ==
- World Series of Fighting
- List of WSOF champions
- List of WSOF events
