= Adam Schindler =

American mixed martial arts fighter

- Born: May 19, 1983 (age 43)
- Nationality: American
- Height: 5 ft 8 in (173 cm)
- Weight: 155 lb (70 kg; 11 st 1 lb)
- Division: Lightweight; Featherweight
- Reach: 68 in (173 cm)
- Fighting out of: Houston, Texas, United States
- Team: 4oz. Fight Club
- Years active: 2009-2013

Mixed martial arts record
- Total: 16
- Wins: 10
- By knockout: 1
- By submission: 6
- By decision: 3
- Losses: 6
- By knockout: 4
- By decision: 2

Other information
- Mixed martial arts record from Sherdog

Adam Schindler (born May 19, 1983) is an American mixed martial artist who last competed in 2013. A professional from 2009 until 2013, he fought for Bellator and Strikeforce.

== Mixed martial arts career ==
=== Bellator Fighting Championships ===
Schindler made his Bellator debut on May 27, 2010, when he faced Brian Melancon at Bellator 20. He won via unanimous decision. He then dropped to Featherweight to compete in Bellator's Featherweight Tournament, facing Ronnie Mann at Bellator 46 on June 25, 2011. He lost via KO (punches) in the first round.

In his last fight with Bellator, Schindler faced Jeremy Spoon at Bellator 56 on October 29, 2011. He lost via unanimous decision and asked to be released from his contract shortly thereafter

=== Legacy FC ===
Schindler signed with Legacy FC in April 2013, and quickly made his debut in May, replacing Junior Assuncao to face Chris Pecero at Legacy FC 20. He lost via TKO in the second round.

=== Strikeforce ===
Schindler is a one-fight veteran in now-defunct promotion Strikeforce, he made his debut on August 21, 2010, facing Kierre Gooch at Strikeforce: Houston. He won via rear-naked choke submission.

== Championships and accomplishments ==
- Battlegrounds
  - Battlegrounds Lightweight Championship (One time)
- International Xtreme Fight Association
  - IXFA Lightweight Championship (One time)

== Mixed martial arts record ==
Professional record breakdown
| 16 matches | 10 wins | 6 losses |
| By knockout | 1 | 4 |
| By submission | 6 | 0 |
| By decision | 3 | 2 |

| Res. | Record | Opponent | Method | Event | Date | Round | Time | Location | Notes |
|---|---|---|---|---|---|---|---|---|---|
| Loss | 10–6 | Chris Pecero | TKO (knees) | Legacy FC 20 | May 31, 2013 | 2 | 1:02 | Corpus Christi, Texas, United States | Featherweight bout. |
| Loss | 10–5 | Chase Hackett | TKO (knee injury) | Fight To Win: Superheroes | May 19, 2012 | 1 | 1:54 | Denver, Colorado, United States | For the Fight To Win Lightweight Championship. |
| Win | 10–4 | Yoshiaki Takahashi | TKO (punches) | G1 Fights: Sovereign Valor | January 28, 2012 | 1 | 2:55 | Kinder, Louisiana, United States | Return to Lightweight. |
| Loss | 9–4 | Jeremy Spoon | Decision (unanimous) | Bellator 56 | October 29, 2011 | 3 | 5:00 | Kansas City, Kansas, United States | |
| Loss | 9–3 | Ronnie Mann | KO (punches) | Bellator 46 | June 25, 2011 | 1 | 4:14 | Hollywood, Florida, United States | Featherweight debut. |
| Win | 9–2 | Marc Ramirez | Decision (split) | International Xtreme Fight Association | December 4, 2010 | 5 | 5:00 | Houston, Texas, United States | Won the IXFA Lightweight Championship. |
| Win | 8–2 | Kierre Gooch | Submission (rear-naked choke) | Strikeforce: Houston | August 21, 2010 | 1 | 1:58 | Houston, Texas, United States | |
| Win | 7–2 | Brian Melancon | Decision (unanimous) | Bellator 20 | May 27, 2010 | 3 | 5:00 | San Antonio, Texas, United States | Catchweight (161 lbs) bout. |
| Win | 6–2 | Christopher Golden | Submission (rear-naked choke) | Supreme Warrior Championship 10 | April 3, 2010 | 1 | 0:24 | Frisco, Texas, United States | |
| Win | 5–2 | David Fuentes | Submission (arm-triangle choke) | South Texas Fighting Championships 9 | November 13, 2009 | 1 | 1:41 | McAllen, Texas, United States | |
| Win | 4–2 | Lane Yarbrough | Decision (unanimous) | King of Kombat 7 | August 29, 2009 | 3 | 5:00 | Austin, Texas, United States | |
| Loss | 3–2 | Derrick Krantz | TKO (punches) | Ascend Combat: Best of the Best Tournament | June 6, 2009 | 2 | 1:14 | Shreveport, Louisiana, United States | |
| Loss | 3–1 | Derek Campos | Decision (unanimous) | King of Kombat 6 | April 25, 2009 | 3 | 5:00 | Austin, Texas, United States | |
| Win | 3–0 | Gary Hancock | Submission (rear-naked choke) | Battlegrounds 5 | March 14, 2009 | 1 | 3:21 | New Orleans, Louisiana, United States | Won the Battlegrounds Lightweight Championship. |
| Win | 2–0 | Justin Reiswerg | Submission (guillotine choke | King of Kombat 5 | November 22, 2008 | 2 | 1:42 | Austin, Texas, United States | |
| Win | 1–0 | Jorge Batista | Submission (keylock) | Katana Cagefighting: Equi-Knocks | August 23, 2008 | 2 | 1:24 | Robstown, Texas, United States | |
