= Nick Ring =

Boxer and mixed martial arts fighter

- Born: February 10, 1979 (age 47); Cedar Rapids, Iowa, USA
- Other names: The Promise
- Height: 6 ft 0 in (1.83 m)
- Weight: 185 lb (84 kg; 13.2 st)
- Division: Middleweight
- Reach: 74 in (188 cm)
- Stance: Southpaw
- Fighting out of: Calgary, Alberta, Canada
- Team: Champion's Creed Martial Arts; Tristar Gym
- Rank: Black Belt in Brazilian Jiu-Jitsu under Brian Bird; Black Belt in Muay Thai under Mike Miles
- Years active: 2002–2015

Professional boxing record
- Total: 6
- Wins: 5
- By knockout: 2
- Losses: 1

Mixed martial arts record
- Total: 18
- Wins: 14
- By knockout: 2
- By submission: 6
- By decision: 6
- Losses: 4
- By decision: 4

Other information
- Boxing record from BoxRec
- Mixed martial arts record from Sherdog

Nick Ring (born February 10, 1979) is a professional boxer and mixed martial artist who is best known for competing in the middleweight division of the Ultimate Fighting Championship. A professional MMA competitor from 2002 to 2015, Ring fought in various promotions. Ring was a competitor on Spike TV's The Ultimate Fighter 11.

== Mixed martial arts career ==
=== Early career ===
Ring's early background in fighting was as a kickboxer, where he compiled around 30 fights. His transition to MMA was quoted as being because "eventually what I liked about MMA versus kickboxing – and I love kickboxing – was just the whole ground aspect. I like the purity of an MMA fight."

Ring was also a professional boxer (during his hiatus from MMA through injury) with a record of 4–1, with 2 victories coming by knockout.

Ring started his MMA career in 2002 in local promotions in his home region of Alberta, Canada against Bill Mahood. Ring was able to win via verbal submission just 22 seconds into the first round.

A year later, Ring made his second professional MMA appearance against Wyatt Lewis. Ring was again victorious, this time via decision after 2 rounds.

Just two weeks later, Ring fought again. Against Alex Gasson, Ring won another decision and followed this up with a submission (strikes) victory over Kevin Dolan.

Two years later, Ring made his return to mixed martial arts against Kimo Woelfel, winning via first round rear naked choke. Ring next fought Mike Malone and won via first round TKO; his first TKO of his career. Ring later won a unanimous decision over Ryuichi Murata.

=== Injury and return at Bellator ===
Ring suffered a knee injury which forced him out of competition for over three years. During this time, Ring took up a professional boxing career, compiling a record of 4–1, with three knockouts. He eventually made his return to MMA when he signed with Bellator.

At Bellator 9, Ring fought Isidro Gonzalez and was able to submit him in 39 seconds with a guillotine choke. Ring then won his next two fights against Chester Post and Yannick Galipeau, both in the first round.

It was rumored that Ring was offered a place in Bellator at the same time as The Ultimate Fighter.

=== The Ultimate Fighter ===
In March 2010, Ring was announced as part of the eleventh season of The Ultimate Fighter.

In a dominant first performance, to gain entry into the TUF house, Ring defeated Woody Wetherby via TKO due to punches in round 1. Ring earned praise from Tito Ortiz, who expressed his interest in selecting Ring as the first member of Team Punishment. This was indeed to be the case as Ortiz selected him as his number one pick, making Ring the first overall pick of the competition.

For his second bout, Ring fought Court McGee, winning via majority decision (20–18, 19–19, 20–18).

Later on in the competition, McGee was reinstated and the two were set to have a rematch in the quarter-finals. However, after visiting the doctor, Ring discovered that he faced a third ACL reconstruction surgery and faced a choice; fight on injured and risk tearing his meniscus, or withdraw from competition and have surgery immediately. James Hammortree was named as Ring's replacement.

Due to his knee injury and surgery, Ring was not able to compete at the TUF 11 Finale. Ring's surgery took place on April 8, 2010, and afterwards, Ring faced a long period of recovery time, getting cleared to train in September. After his recovery, Ring trained for his debut at UFC 127 at his home club, BDB Martial Arts in Calgary AB, and at Tristar Gym in Montreal QC, with the likes of Georges St-Pierre and Rory MacDonald.

=== Ultimate Fighting Championship ===
Ring beat promotional newcomer and DEEP middleweight champion, Riki Fukuda on February 27, 2011, at UFC 127 via controversial unanimous decision. All three judges gave Ring the first two rounds despite Fukuda controlling all three rounds with takedowns. Literally all major MMA media news organizations scored the fight as a decision win for Fukuda. Regardless of Ring's win on the scorecards, UFC president Dana White, as well as many spectators, felt Fukuda won the bout. Dana stated on his Twitter account that Fukuda would be paid his win bonus.

For his sophomore UFC bout, Ring faced promotional newcomer James Head on June 11, 2011, at UFC 131. He won the fight via submission in the third round.

In his third UFC fight, Ring faced Tim Boetsch on September 24, 2011, at UFC 135. He lost the fight via unanimous decision, the first loss of his professional MMA career.

Ring then fought Court McGee in a rematch from their time on The Ultimate Fighter on July 21, 2012, at UFC 149. Ring won via unanimous decision. For the second time in a bout against McGee, the win was regarded as controversial by many media sources. Stats after the fight showed that McGee outstruck Ring 32–25 in the second round and 53–16 in the final round. After the fight, McGee said "I felt like I had cage control, was more aggressive, out-struck him and attempted a submission in the third round. I should not have left it in the hands of the judges and finished the fight."

Ring was expected to face Costas Philippou on November 17, 2012, at UFC 154 but the fight was cancelled due to Ring's illness on the day of the weigh ins.

Ring faced Chris Camozzi on March 16, 2013, at UFC 158. He lost the fight via split decision.

Ring was expected to meet Uriah Hall at UFC Fight Night 26. However, Ring was pulled from the bout and initially replaced by Josh Samman, who was ultimately pulled and replaced by UFC returnee John Howard.

Ring faced Caio Magalhães on December 7, 2013, at UFC Fight Night 33. He lost the fight via unanimous decision.

=== Post UFC career ===
Nick was released from the UFC. In his first post-UFC bout, he defeated Jason Zentgraf via unanimous decision at Hard Knocks Fighting Championship 43 on May 22, 2015, in Calgary, Alberta.

== Personal life ==
Nick Ring and both of his parents were born in the United States of America. On June 6, 2012, Ring was leaving a Starbucks at Macleod Trail and 94th Avenue in Calgary when he saw a group of about 6–10 people across the street beating up a couple to steal a young woman's backpack. One girl had another girl by her hair and was kneeing her in the face while her boyfriend was trying to protect her but was being held down. Ring got out of his car, checked on the victims, and along with another bystander who saw the fight in progress started to chase what he called the "wannabe gangsters" who ran when they saw them. As he chased the suspects, who appeared to be about 17 or 18 years old, Ring called police on his cellphone and the pair were able to catch one suspect. Ring says police caught another five or six suspects. Calgary Police have advised citizens to avoid participating in this type of heroics.

== Professional boxing record ==
6 fights	5 wins	1 loss
By knockout	2	0
By decision	3	1

No.	Result	Record	Opponent	Method	Round, time	Date	Location	Notes
6	Win	5–1	(Canada) Elvis Vukaj	UD	6	April 3, 2015	(Canada) Deerfoot Inn & Casino, Calgary, Alberta	
5	Win	4–1	(Canada) Willard Lewis	TKO	4 (8), 3:00	April 25, 2009	(Canada) Deerfoot Inn & Casino, Calgary, Alberta	
4	Loss	3–1	(Canada) Kevin Reynolds	UD	8	December 27, 2008	(Canada) Red Robinson Show Theatre, Coquitlam, British Columbia	
3	Win	3–0	(Canada) Kombo Mohamed	TKO	1 (4), 2:24	March 15, 2008	(Canada) Bowness Sports Plex, Calgary, Alberta	
2	Win	2–0	(Canada) Chris Ladouceur	MD	4	November 22, 2007	(Canada) Chateau Lacombe Hotel, Edmonton, Alberta	
1	Win	1–0	(Canada) Paul Tryl	UD	4	September 27, 2007	(Canada) Croatian Cultural Centre, Vancouver, British Columbia	

== Mixed martial arts record ==
Professional record breakdown
18 matches	14 wins	4 losses
By knockout	2	0
By submission	6	0
By decision	6	4

Res.	Record	Opponent	Method	Event	Date	Round	Time	Location	Notes
Loss	14–4	Cory Devela	Decision (unanimous)	Hard Knocks 44	June 26, 2015	3	5:00	Calgary, Alberta, Canada	
Win	14–3	Jason Zentgraf	Decision (unanimous)	Hard Knocks 43	May 22, 2015	3	5:00	Calgary, Alberta, Canada	
Loss	13–3	Caio Magalhães	Decision (unanimous)	UFC Fight Night: Hunt vs. Bigfoot	December 7, 2013	3	5:00	Brisbane, Queensland, Australia	
Loss	13–2	Chris Camozzi	Decision (split)	UFC 158	March 16, 2013	3	5:00	Montreal, Quebec, Canada	
Win	13–1	Court McGee	Decision (unanimous)	UFC 149	July 21, 2012	3	5:00	Calgary, Alberta, Canada	
Loss	12–1	Tim Boetsch	Decision (unanimous)	UFC 135	September 24, 2011	3	5:00	Denver, Colorado, United States	
Win	12–0	James Head	Submission (rear-naked choke)	UFC 131	June 11, 2011	3	3:33	Vancouver, British Columbia, Canada	
Win	11–0	Riki Fukuda	Decision (unanimous)	UFC 127	February 27, 2011	3	5:00	Sydney, Australia	
Win	10–0	Yannick Galipeau	Submission (armbar)	AMMA 1: First Blood	October 24, 2009	1	2:30	Edmonton, Alberta, Canada	
Win	9–0	Chester Post	TKO (punches)	Rumble in the Cage 36	September 12, 2009	1	2:24	Lethbridge, Alberta, Canada	
Win	8–0	Isidro Gonzalez	Submission (guillotine choke)	Bellator 9	May 29, 2009	1	0:39	Monroe, Louisiana, United States	
Win	7–0	Ryuichi Murata	Decision (unanimous)	Deep: 23 Impact	February 5, 2006	2	5:00	Tokyo, Japan	
Win	6–0	Mike Malone	TKO (punches)	Icon Sport – Opposites Attract	October 28, 2005	1	3:04	Hawaii, United States	
Win	5–0	Kimo Woelfel	Submission (rear-naked choke)	Superbrawl – Icon	July 23, 2005	1	2:06	Honolulu, Hawaii, United States	
Win	4–0	Kevin Dolan	Submission (punches)	WFF 4 – Civil War	April 4, 2003	1	1:20	Vancouver, British Columbia, Canada	
Win	3–0	Alex Gasson	Decision (unanimous)	Calgary Max	February 22, 2003	3	5:00	Calgary, Alberta, Canada	
Win	2–0	Wyatt Lewis	Decision (unanimous)	Roadhouse Rumble 7	February 8, 2003	2	5:00	Lethbridge, Alberta, Canada	
Win	1–0	Bill Mahood	Submission (verbal)	Roadhouse Rumble 5	February 23, 2002	1	0:22	Lethbridge, Alberta, Canada	

== See also ==
- List of Bellator MMA alumni
- List of male boxers
- List of mixed martial artists with professional boxing records
- List of Canadian UFC fighters
