= UFC Fight Night: Condit vs. Kampmann 2 =

2013 mixed martial arts event

- The poster for UFC Fight Night: Condit vs. Kampmann 2
- Promotion: Ultimate Fighting Championship
- Date: August 28, 2013
- Venue: Bankers Life Fieldhouse
- City: Indianapolis, Indiana
- Attendance: 6,417
- Total gate: $355,290

Event chronology
UFC Fight Night: Shogun vs. Sonnen	UFC Fight Night: Condit vs. Kampmann 2	UFC 164: Henderson vs. Pettis 2

UFC Fight Night: Condit vs. Kampmann 2 (also known as UFC Fight Night 27) was a mixed martial arts event held on August 28, 2013, at the Bankers Life Fieldhouse in Indianapolis, Indiana. The event was broadcast live on Fox Sports 1.

== Background ==
The main event was a rematch between Martin Kampmann and former UFC Interim Welterweight Champion and former WEC Welterweight Champion Carlos Condit. In their first encounter at UFC Fight Night 18 in 2009, Kampmann defeated Condit (who was making his promotional debut) via split decision.

A bout between promotional newcomers Nandor Guelmino and Derrick Lewis was briefly linked to this event. However, Lewis was forced out of the bout with an injury and Guelmino was removed from the card and scheduled for a later bout at UFC 165.

A bout between Bobby Voelker and James Head was briefly scheduled for this event. However, on July 11, it was announced that Voelker had been brought in as a replacement for Siyar Bahadurzada and would face Robbie Lawler on July 27, 2013, at UFC on Fox 8. Jason High stepped in to face Head as a replacement for Voelker.

Paulo Thiago was expected to face Kelvin Gastelum at the event. However, Thiago pulled out of the bout citing a knee injury and was replaced by Brian Melancon.

Sarah Kaufman was expected to face Sara McMann at the event. However, McMann pulled out of the bout for undisclosed personal reasons. As a result, Kaufmann was pulled from the event as well.

A flyweight bout between UFC newcomers Dustin Ortiz and Justin Scoggins was briefly linked to this event, but was removed from the card.

== Results ==
Main card (Fox Sports 1)
Weight class				Method	Round	Time	Notes
Welterweight	Carlos Condit	def.	Martin Kampmann	TKO (punches and knees)	4	0:54
Lightweight	Rafael dos Anjos	def.	Donald Cerrone	Decision (unanimous) (29–28, 29–28, 29–28)	3	5:00
Welterweight	Kelvin Gastelum	def.	Brian Melancon	Submission (rear-naked choke)	1	2:26
Welterweight	Court McGee	def.	Robert Whittaker	Decision (split) (27–30, 30–27, 29–28)	3	5:00
Bantamweight	Takeya Mizugaki	def.	Erik Pérez	Decision (split) (28–29, 29–28, 29–28)	3	5:00
Middleweight	Brad Tavares	def.	Bubba McDaniel	Decision (unanimous) (29–28, 29–28, 29–28)	3	5:00
Preliminary card (Fox Sports 2)
Middleweight	Dylan Andrews	def.	Papy Abedi	TKO (punches)	3	1:32
Welterweight	Brandon Thatch	def.	Justin Edwards	TKO (knees and punches)	1	1:23
Featherweight	Darren Elkins	def.	Hatsu Hioki	Decision (unanimous) (29–28, 29–28, 29–28)	3	5:00
Welterweight	Jason High	def.	James Head	Submission (guillotine choke)	1	1:41
Preliminary card (Facebook)
Welterweight	Zak Cummings	def.	Ben Alloway	Submission (D'Arce choke)	1	4:19
Lightweight	Roger Bowling	vs.	Abel Trujillo	NC (illegal knee)	2	4:57	(Note: Trujillo landed an unintentional illegal knee that rendered Bowling unable to continue.)

== Bonus awards ==
The following fighters received $50,000 bonuses.

- Fight of the Night: Carlos Condit vs. Martin Kampmann
- Knockout of the Night: Brandon Thatch
- Submission of the Night: Zak Cummings

== See also ==
- List of UFC events
- 2013 in UFC
