= Jason High =

American mixed martial arts fighter

- Born: October 12, 1981 (age 45); Kansas City, Missouri, United States
- Other names: The Kansas City Bandit
- Height: 5 ft 9 in (1.75 m)
- Weight: 155 lb (70 kg; 11.1 st)
- Division: Lightweight (2014–present); Welterweight (2005–2013)
- Reach: 71 in (180 cm)
- Stance: Southpaw
- Fighting out of: Lakewood, California, United States
- Team: Team Bodyshop (2007–2011); HD MMA (2011–2014); American Top Team HD MMA (2014–present); Cleber Jiu-Jitsu (formerly)
- Rank: Black belt in Brazilian Jiu-Jitsu under Ricardo Libório
- Years active: 2005–2020

Mixed martial arts record
- Total: 31
- Wins: 23
- By knockout: 7
- By submission: 8
- By decision: 8
- Losses: 8
- By knockout: 4
- By submission: 3
- By decision: 1

Other information
- University: University of Nebraska–Lincoln
- Mixed martial arts record from Sherdog

Jason High (born October 12, 1981) is an American mixed martial artist who most recently competed in the Lightweight division of the Professional Fighters League. A professional competitor since 2005, High has also competed for Strikeforce, Affliction, Titan FC, the World Series of Fighting, DREAM and the Ultimate Fighting Championship.

== Background ==
High was born in Kansas City, Missouri and has two brothers and a sister. High began playing football and baseball from a young age, before moving to Blue Springs, Missouri at the age of 10, where he discovered wrestling. By his sophomore year at Blue Springs High School he was on the varsity squad. He was a standout in high school, holding a record of 102–23 over three years, with a 44–7 record in his senior year while setting the school's takedown record and finishing fifth in Missouri's state championships. High was also an all-state selection in 1999. He then continued at the collegiate level for five years. He first spent two years at Meramec Community College in St. Louis where he did very well and also qualified twice for the national championships. High then spent three years at the University of Nebraska–Lincoln as a walk-on player, which has a very prestigious Division I program. High had a rough start to his career for Nebraska, going 4–16 in his first year on campus, but was able to turn his career around and had winning record of 11–10 in his last year of eligibility. High graduated with three varsity letters from Nebraska. In his last semester at Nebraska, High attended a college in Costa Rica where he discovered jiu-jitsu. He earned a degree in history and used to work as an operations manager and full-time EMT for a private ambulance company. He was still working in the early part of his mixed martial arts career.

== Mixed martial arts ==
=== Early career ===
High had one amateur fight in 2005, a submission win, before making his professional debut a month later. High won his first seven professional fights before making his debut in Affliction.

=== Affliction ===
Jason High made his Affliction debut losing to Jay Hieron at the Day of Reckoning card. High was knocked unconscious by one of Hieron's punches.

=== DREAM ===
High later entered DREAM's welterweight grand prix. In the opening round of the tournament on April 5, 2009, he faced Yuya Shirai. High defeated Shirai quickly in the first round by rear naked choke. In the next round, at Dream 10, he upset Brazilian André Galvão by decision. He faced Marius Zaromskis in the finals, but was knocked out in the first round of the match.

=== Ultimate Fighting Championship ===
High later signed with the UFC and made his debut against Charlie Brenneman on the preliminary card of UFC Fight Night: Florian vs. Gomi, losing via unanimous decision. After the loss to Brenneman, High was released from the organization.

=== Post-UFC ===
High moved back to his hometown of Kansas City and opened a facility in Leawood, Kansas with LC Davis and also began training at American Top Team in Coconut Creek, Florida. He rebounded from his two consecutive losses with a unanimous decision victory against Jordan Mein, a young, up and comer from Canada at RITC 40 in Taber, Alberta. He followed that with a first round stoppage of the previously undefeated Keto Allen at Heat XC 6 on the 15th of October.

High faced Hayato Sakurai on December 31, 2010, at Dynamite!! 2010. He won the fight via split decision.

High next faced Rudy Bears on January 28, 2011, at Titan Fighting 16. He won via submission in the first round.

=== Strikeforce ===
On February 7, 2011, it was announced that High had signed a multi-fight contract with Strikeforce. He made his debut at Strikeforce Challengers: Fodor vs. Terry and defeated Quinn Mulhern via unanimous decision.

In his second fight for the promotion, High faced Todd Moore in September 2011 at Strikeforce Challengers: Larkin vs. Rossborough. He won the fight via unanimous decision.

For his third Strikeforce fight, High fought Nate Moore in July 2012 on the preliminary card of Strikeforce: Rockhold vs. Kennedy. He won the fight via guillotine choke submission at just 26 seconds into the first round.

=== Return to the UFC ===
On January 8, 2013, High announced he signed a contract with the UFC.

High was expected to face Ildemar Alcantara on June 8, 2013, at UFC on Fuel TV 10. However, High was pulled from the bout with Alcantara in late April in favor of a bout on the same card against Erick Silva, after Silva's original opponent, John Hathaway was pulled from the event. He lost the fight via triangle armbar submission.

High faced James Head on August 28, 2013, at UFC Fight Night 27. He won the bout via first round guillotine choke submission.

High faced Anthony Lapsley on November 16, 2013, at UFC 167. He won the fight via unanimous decision.

On an appearance with Ariel Helwani on The MMA Hour on November 18, 2013, High indicated an interest in dropping down to the Lightweight division. He is hoping to have his next fight (and Lightweight debut) sometime in early first quarter 2014.

High was expected to face Adlan Amagov on January 15, 2014, at UFC Fight Night 35, However, Amagov pulled out of the bout due to injury and was replaced by promotional newcomer Baneil Dariush. In turn, High pulled out of the bout citing appendicitis and was replaced by returning veteran Charlie Brenneman.

High faced Rafael dos Anjos in a Lightweight bout on June 7, 2014, at UFC Fight Night 42. He lost the fight via TKO in round two. High protested the stoppage, believing it to be too early, and proceeded to shove the referee. High was released from his UFC contract as a result.

=== World Series of Fighting ===
On August 18, 2015, it was announced that High had signed with the World Series of Fighting. He made his promotional debut again fellow Strikeforce and UFC veteran Estevan Payan on November 20, 2015, at WSOF 25. High won the fight via knockout in the second round.

On March 23, 2016, it was announced that High will fight in the co-main event at WSOF 31 on June 17, 2016, against Bellator and UFC vet Mike Ricci. He won via technical knockout in the second round.

High faced João Zeferino at WSOF 33 on October 7, 2016. He lost via technical knockout in the third round.

=== Professional Fighters League ===
High next faced Caros Fodor on June 30, 2017, at Professional Fighters League 36: Fitch vs. Foster. He won the fight via unanimous decision.

High faced Efraín Escudero in a lightweight tournament bout at PFL 2 in Chicago on June 21, 2018. He lost the fight via technical submission in the third round. The ending was controversial as the referee stopped the bout when High quickly moved his hand under Escudero's body, resulting in the referee believing it was a tap. However, upon review of replays, it was clear High had not tapped.

In his second fight in the tournament, High faced Natan Schulte on August 2, 2018, at PFL 5. He lost the fight via technical submission due to a rear-naked choke in the first round.

High was then scheduled to face Johnny Case at PFL 7 on August 30, 2018, for the PFL playoff eliminator bout. However, High could not make weight and Case advanced to playoffs via walkover win.

=== Regional circuit ===
After the season 2018 of PFL, High was scheduled to face Josh Weston at FAC 2 on February 22, 2020. However, High withdrew due to unknown reason and the bout was rebooked to October 9, 2020. High won the bout via second-round knockout, claiming the inaugural FAC Welterweight Championship.

High made his first title defense against Jake Lindsey at FAC 5 on December 11, 2020. He won the fight via technical knockout in the fifth round.

== Championships and accomplishments ==
=== Mixed martial arts ===
- DREAM
  - 2009 DREAM Welterweight Grand Prix Runner Up
- Fighting Alliance Championship
  - FAC Welterweight Championship (one time; current)
    - One successful title defense

=== Brazilian jiu-jitsu ===
- International Brazilian Jiu-Jitsu Federation
  - 2012 IBJJF World Championship winner (blue belt, medium-heavyweight)

== Mixed martial arts record ==
Professional record breakdown
31 matches	23 wins	8 losses
By knockout	7	4
By submission	8	3
By decision	8	1

Res.	Record	Opponent	Method	Event	Date	Round	Time	Location	Notes
Win	23–8	Jake Lindsey	TKO (punches)	FAC 5	December 11, 2020	5	0:20	Independence, Missouri, United States	Defended the FAC Welterweight Championship.
Win	22–8	Josh Weston	KO (punch)	FAC 4	October 9, 2020	2	1:16	Independence, Missouri, United States	Won the FAC Welterweight Championship.
Loss	21–8	Natan Schulte	Technical Submission (rear-naked choke)	PFL 5	August 2, 2018	1	4:18	Uniondale, New York, United States	
Loss	21–7	Efraín Escudero	Technical Submission (guillotine choke)	PFL 2	June 21, 2018	3	0:35	Chicago, Illinois, United States	Catchweight (162 lb) bout; Escudero missed weight
Win	21–6	Caros Fodor	Decision (unanimous)	Professional Fighters League - PFL: Daytona	June 30, 2017	3	5:00	Daytona Beach, Florida, United States	
Loss	20–6	João Zeferino	TKO (punches)	WSOF 33	October 7, 2016	3	0:51	Kansas City, Missouri, United States	Catchweight (160 lbs) bout.
Win	20–5	Mike Ricci	TKO (punches)	WSOF 31	June 17, 2016	2	4:08	Mashantucket, Connecticut, United States	
Win	19–5	Estevan Payan	KO (head kick and punches)	WSOF 25	November 20, 2015	2	0:47	Phoenix, Arizona, United States	
Loss	18–5	Rafael dos Anjos	TKO (punches)	UFC Fight Night: Henderson vs. Khabilov	June 7, 2014	2	3:36	Albuquerque, New Mexico, United States	Lightweight debut.
Win	18–4	Anthony Lapsley	Decision (unanimous)	UFC 167	November 16, 2013	3	5:00	Las Vegas, Nevada, United States	
Win	17–4	James Head	Submission (guillotine choke)	UFC Fight Night: Condit vs. Kampmann 2	August 28, 2013	1	1:41	Indianapolis, Indiana, United States	
Loss	16–4	Erick Silva	Submission (reverse triangle-armbar)	UFC on Fuel TV: Nogueira vs. Werdum	June 8, 2013	1	1:11	Fortaleza, Brazil	
Win	16–3	Nate Moore	Submission (guillotine choke)	Strikeforce: Rockhold vs. Kennedy	July 14, 2012	1	0:26	Portland, Oregon, United States	
Win	15–3	Todd Moore	Decision (unanimous)	Strikeforce Challengers: Larkin vs. Rossborough	September 23, 2011	3	5:00	Las Vegas, Nevada, United States	
Win	14–3	Quinn Mulhern	Decision (unanimous)	Strikeforce Challengers: Fodor vs. Terry	June 24, 2011	3	5:00	Kent, Washington, United States	
Win	13–3	Rudy Bears	Technical Submission (guillotine choke)	Titan FC 16	January 29, 2011	1	0:51	Kansas City, Kansas, United States	
Win	12–3	Hayato Sakurai	Decision (split)	Dynamite!! 2010	December 31, 2010	3	5:00	Saitama, Japan	
Win	11–3	Keto Allen	TKO (punches)	Heat XC 6: Bragging Rights	October 15, 2010	1	2:08	Edmonton, Alberta, Canada	
Win	10–3	Jordan Mein	Decision (unanimous)	Rumble in the Cage 40	August 26, 2010	3	5:00	Taber, Alberta, Canada	
Loss	9–3	Charlie Brenneman	Decision (unanimous)	UFC Fight Night: Florian vs. Gomi	March 31, 2010	3	5:00	Charlotte, North Carolina, United States	
Loss	9–2	Marius Žaromskis	KO (head kick)	Dream 10	July 20, 2009	1	2:22	Saitama, Saitama, Japan	DREAM Welterweight Grand Prix Final Round
Win	9–1	André Galvão	Decision (split)	Dream 10	July 20, 2009	2	5:00	Saitama, Japan	DREAM Welterweight Grand Prix Semi-Final Round
Win	8–1	Yuya Shirai	Submission (rear-naked choke)	Dream 8	April 5, 2009	1	0:59	Aichi, Japan	DREAM Welterweight Grand Prix Opening Round
Loss	7–1	Jay Hieron	KO (punch)	Affliction: Day of Reckoning	January 24, 2009	1	1:04	Anaheim, California, United States	
Win	7–0	Markhaile Wedderburn	Submission (guillotine choke)	Iroquois: MMA Championships 4	June 21, 2008	1	0:45	Hagersville, Ontario, Canada	
Win	6–0	Troy Acker	KO (punch)	GC 74: Evolution	February 16, 2008	1	0:24	Los Angeles, California, United States	
Win	5–0	Jay Diamond	Submission (guillotine choke)	International Gladiator Championships	November 10, 2007	1	1:41	Guatemala City, Guatemala	
Win	4–0	Kevin Burns	TKO (doctor stoppage)	VFC 18: Hitmen	February 16, 2007	2	5:00	Council Bluffs, Iowa, United States	
Win	3–0	James Giboo	Submission (rear-naked choke)	MCC 3: Mayhem	May 20, 2006	2	0:56	Des Moines, Iowa, United States	
Win	2–0	Bryce Teager	Decision (unanimous)	VFC 12: Warpath	February 25, 2006	3	5:00	Council Bluffs, Iowa, United States	
Win	1–0	Sean Westbrook	Submission (rear-naked choke)	AFC 3: Impact	September 24, 2005	2	2:50	Omaha, Nebraska, United States	

== Bare knuckle boxing record ==
Professional record breakdown
1 match	1 win	0 losses
By knockout	1	0

Res.	Record	Opponent	Method	Event	Date	Round	Time	Location	Notes
Win	1–0	Rocky Long	TKO (punches)	BKFC 21	September 10, 2021	1	1:59	Omaha, Nebraska, United States	

== See also ==
- List of male mixed martial artists
