= Mike Ricci (fighter) =

Canadian martial artist

- Born: March 18, 1986 (age 40); Montreal, Quebec
- Other names: The Accountant, The Martian
- Height: 6 ft 2 in (1.88 m)
- Weight: 155 lb (70 kg; 11.1 st)
- Division: Lightweight; Welterweight
- Reach: 76 in (190 cm)
- Fighting out of: Montreal, Quebec, Canada
- Team: Tristar Gym
- Rank: Black belt in Brazilian jiu-jitsu under Firas Zahabi
- Years active: 2008–2016

Mixed martial arts record
- Total: 20
- Wins: 15
- By knockout: 8
- By submission: 1
- By decision: 6
- Losses: 5
- By knockout: 2
- By decision: 3

Other information
- Mixed martial arts record from Sherdog

Mike Ricci (born March 18, 1986) is a Canadian former mixed martial artist who competed for the Ultimate Fighting Championship and has also fought in Bellator MMA.

== Mixed martial arts career ==
=== Bellator Fighting Championships ===
It was announced that Ricci would be a participant in Bellator Fighting Championships Season 2 Lightweight Tournament. His first round match-up was against Pat Curran the fight took place at Bellator 14 in Chicago, Illinois, a little more than midway through the round, Curran connected on a powerful right hook that sent Ricci crashing to the mat where he stayed unconscious for a few minutes after a few follow up punches. The bout was stopped, and Curran won via KO in the first round.

=== The Ultimate Fighter ===
Ricci joined the cast of The Ultimate Fighter: Team Carwin vs. Team Nelson as part of Team Carwin. In his first fight Ricci defeated Dom Waters via unanimous decision in the first round of the tournament. Following his first round victory Ricci went on to fight fellow Canadian Michael Hill in the quarterfinals of the tournament winning via unanimous decision. Ricci went on to defeat Neil Magny in the semifinals winning via knockout in the first round and also winning Knockout of the Season.

=== Ultimate Fighting Championship ===
Ricci was defeated by Colton Smith via unanimous decision on December 15, 2012, at The Ultimate Fighter: Team Carwin vs. Team Nelson Finale.

For his second UFC fight, Ricci returned to lightweight division. He defeated Colin Fletcher via unanimous decision on March 16, 2013, at UFC 158.

Ricci next faced Myles Jury on September 21, 2013, at UFC 165. He lost the fight via split decision. His release from the UFC was subsequently announced on the internet and social network sites on Friday, September 27, 2013.

=== Titan Fighting Championship ===
Ricci made his Titan Fighting Championships debut against former Strikeforce and UFC fighter Jorge Gurgel on February 28, 2014, at Titan FC 27. He won via TKO due to punches and elbows in the first round.

Ricci was expected to face George Sotiropoulos at Titan Fighting Championship 28 on April 25, 2014, however Ricci suffered an injury and the fight was rescheduled for August 22, 2014, at Titan FC 29. He won the fight via unanimous decision.

Ricci was expected to face Yoshiyuki Yoshida for the vacant Titan FC Lightweight Championship at Titan FC 31 on October 31, 2014. Prior to the fight, Ricci failed to make weight. Both men agreed to fight in a non-title 157 lb catchweight fight instead, but it was ultimately cancelled due to Yoshida refusing to fight just hours before the event.

=== World Series of Fighting ===
On August 18, 2015, it was announced that Ricci signed with the World Series of Fighting.

Ricci made his WSOF debut on November 20, 2015, at WSOF 25 in a one night only eight man Lightweight tournament to determine a number one contender for the WSOF Lightweight Championship. He was set to face fellow UFC veteran Brian Cobb in the quarterfinal bout but Cobb was replaced by Joe Condon. Ricci won via knockout due to a head kick in the first round. However, Ricci suffered a hip injury and was replaced in the tournament for his quarterfinal bout.

On December 18, 2015, it was announced that Ricci will fight in the co-main event at WSOF 27 on January 23, 2016, against Caros Fodor. Ricci was later replaced by Luiz Firmino at this event due to an injury.

On March 23, 2016, it was announced that Ricci will fight in the co-main event at WSOF 31 on June 17, 2016, against Strikeforce and UFC vet Jason High. He lost via technical knockout in the second round.

== Championships and accomplishments ==
- Ultimate Fighting Championship
  - The Ultimate Fighter 16 Knockout of the Season

== Mixed martial arts record ==
Professional record breakdown
16 matches	11 wins	5 losses
By knockout	6	2
By submission	1	0
By decision	4	3

Res.	Record	Opponent	Method	Event	Date	Round	Time	Location	Notes
Loss	11–5	Jason High	TKO (punches)	WSOF 31	June 17, 2016	2	4:08	Mashantucket, Connecticut, United States	
Win	11–4	Joe Condon	KO (head kick)	WSOF 25	November 20, 2015	1	2:41	Phoenix, Arizona, United States	WSOF Lightweight Tournament Quarterfinal
Win	10–4	George Sotiropoulos	Decision (unanimous)	Titan FC 29	August 22, 2014	3	5:00	Fayetteville, North Carolina, United States	
Win	9–4	Jorge Gurgel	TKO (punches and elbows)	Titan FC 27	February 28, 2014	1	3:57	Kansas City, Kansas, United States	
Loss	8–4	Myles Jury	Decision (split)	UFC 165	September 21, 2013	3	5:00	Toronto, Ontario, Canada	
Win	8–3	Colin Fletcher	Decision (unanimous)	UFC 158	March 16, 2013	3	5:00	Montreal, Quebec, Canada	Return to Lightweight
Loss	7–3	Colton Smith	Decision (unanimous)	The Ultimate Fighter 16 Finale	December 15, 2012	3	5:00	Las Vegas, Nevada, United States	The Ultimate Fighter 16 Welterweight Final
Win	7–2	Tony Hervey	Decision (unanimous)	Ringside MMA 13	March 17, 2012	3	5:00	Montreal, Quebec, Canada	
Loss	6–2	Daron Cruickshank	Decision (unanimous)	Ringside MMA 12	October 21, 2011	3	5:00	Montreal, Quebec, Canada	
Win	6–1	Jesse Ronson	TKO (punches)	Ringside MMA 10	April 9, 2011	1	3:12	Montreal, Quebec, Canada	
Loss	5–1	Pat Curran	KO (punch)	Bellator 14	April 15, 2010	1	3:01	Chicago, Illinois, United States	Bellator Season 2 Lightweight Tournament Quarterfinal
Win	5–0	Jordan Mein	Decision (unanimous)	Ringside MMA 4	November 14, 2009	3	5:00	Drummondville, Quebec, Canada	
Win	4–0	Jean-Marc Lalonde	TKO (punches)	Ringside MMA 1	May 30, 2009	1	2:35	Montreal, Quebec, Canada	
Win	3–0	Rory McDonell	TKO (body kick)	XMMA 6 - House of Pain	November 8, 2008	2	2:15	Montreal, Quebec, Canada	
Win	2–0	Reza Kamali	Submission (rear-naked choke)	TKO MMA 35	October 3, 2008	1	3:41	Montreal, Quebec, Canada	
Win	1–0	Stephane Chretien	TKO (punches)	TKO MMA 34	June 7, 2008	3	4:58	Montreal, Quebec, Canada	

=== Mixed martial arts exhibition record ===
Exhibition record breakdown		
4 matches	4 wins	0 losses
By knockout	2	0
By decision	2	0

Res.	Record	Opponent	Method	Event	Date	Round	Time	Location	Notes
Win	4–0	Neil Magny	KO (elbow)	The Ultimate Fighter: Team Carwin vs. Team Nelson	December 7, 2012 (airdate)	1	4:12	Las Vegas, Nevada, United States	Semi-Final round
Win	3–0	Michael Hill	Decision (unanimous)	The Ultimate Fighter: Team Carwin vs. Team Nelson	November 30, 2012 (airdate)	2	5:00	Las Vegas, Nevada, United States	Quarter-Final round
Win	2–0	Dom Waters	Decision (unanimous)	The Ultimate Fighter: Team Carwin vs. Team Nelson	November 9, 2012 (airdate)	3	5:00	Las Vegas, Nevada, United States	Preliminary round
Win	1–0	Jason South	TKO (punches)	The Ultimate Fighter: Team Carwin vs. Team Nelson	September 14, 2012 (airdate)	1	1:50	Las Vegas, Nevada, United States	Elimination round
