= Sene =

Sene may refer to:

== Places ==
- Séné, Morbihan, Brittany, France, a commune
- Canton of Séné, Morbihan, Brittany, France
- Sene District, Brong Ahafo Region, Ghana, a former district
  - Sene River, Ghana

== People ==
- Sène, a patronym of the Serer people in West Africa, primarily Senegal, including a list of people
- Benjamin Sene (born 1994) French basketball player
- Diallo Sène (born 1952), Malian statistician and government minister
- Edward Sene (born 2000), Finnish singer and rapper
- Jean-Baptiste-Claude Sené (1747-1803) French furniture maker
- Josep Señé (born 1991) Spanish soccer player
- Monique Sené (born 1936), French nuclear physicist
- Samuel Sené, 21st century French theatre director, musical director, pianist and conductor
- Stephen Sene (born 1983), American football player
- Yacine Sene (born 1982) French basketball player
- Sene Naoupu (born 1984) Irish rugby player
- Sene Ta'ala (born 1973), New Zealand-born Samoan former rugby union player

== Linguistics ==
- Sene language, a Papuan language
- SENE, Southeastern New England English, see New England English

== Other uses ==
- SENE, a U.S. luxury brand
- The Samoan sene, a monetary subunit of the tālā
- Leïti Sène, a character in the Spanish television series Elite

== See also ==
- Paulo de Sene (born 1948), Brazilian weightlifter
- Jesse Sene-Lefao (born 1989) Samoan rugby footballer
- Sene East (district), Ghana
- Sene East (Ghana parliament constituency)
- Sene West (Ghana parliament constituency)
- Sene West (district), Ghana
- Senés, Almeria, Andalusia, Spain
- Senés de Alcubierre, Huesca, Aragon, Spain
