= Sene (Ghana parliament constituency) =

Ghana parliament constituency

- constituency for the Parliament of Ghana
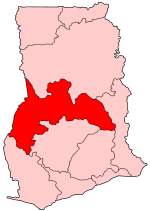
- District: Sene
- Region: Brong-Ahafo Region of Ghana

Current constituency
- Party: National Democratic Congress (NDC)
- MP: Felix Twumasi-Appiah

Felix Twumasi-Appiah NDC is the member of parliament for the constituency. He was elected on the ticket of the National Democratic Congress (NDC) and won a majority of 3,598 votes to become the MP. He had also represented the constituency in the 4th Republic parliament.

This constituency was divided into the Sene East and the Sene West prior to the Ghanaian general election in December 2012. This was among changes that led to the creation of 45 new constituencies that year.

== See also ==
- List of Ghana Parliament constituencies
