= Nick Diaz =

American mixed martial artist

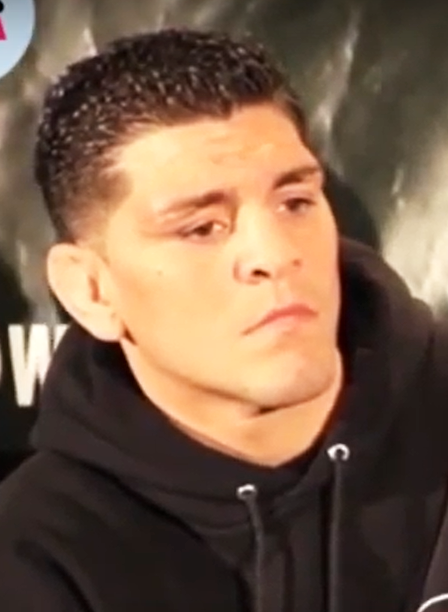
- Diaz in 2010
- Born: Nicholas Robert Diaz; August 2, 1983 (age 43); Stockton, California, U.S.
- Height: 6 ft 1 in (185 cm)
- Weight: 200 lb (91 kg; 14 st 4 lb)
- Division: Lightweight (2001, 2007–2008); Welterweight (2002–2006, 2008–2013, 2017); Middleweight (2015, 2021)
- Reach: 76 in (193 cm)
- Stance: Southpaw
- Fighting out of: Stockton, California, U.S.
- Team: Cesar Gracie Jiu-Jitsu
- Trainer: Richard Perez (Boxing); Cesar Gracie (Brazilian Jiu-Jitsu)
- Rank: 3rd Degree Black belt in Brazilian Jiu-Jitsu under Cesar Gracie
- Years active: 2001–2021 (MMA); 2005 (Boxing)

Professional boxing record
- Total: 1
- Wins: 1

Mixed martial arts record
- Total: 39
- Wins: 27
- By knockout: 14
- By submission: 8
- By decision: 5
- Losses: 10
- By knockout: 3
- By decision: 7
- No contests: 2

Other information
- Notable relatives: Nate Diaz (brother)
- Website: nickdiaz209.com
- Boxing record from BoxRec
- Mixed martial arts record from Sherdog

Nicholas Robert Diaz (born August 2, 1983) is an American professional boxer and mixed martial artist who competed in the Welterweight and Middleweight divisions of the Ultimate Fighting Championship (UFC). Diaz is a former Strikeforce, WEC and IFC Welterweight champion and a UFC title challenger. He also notably competed in PRIDE, EliteXC, DREAM, and Shooto. Nick is the older brother of former UFC fighter Nate Diaz, with the pair of brothers being one of the biggest influences in the sport of MMA.

== Background ==
Diaz was born and raised in Stockton, California. He is of Mexican and Anglo heritage. Nick has a younger brother, Nate and a younger sister Nina who were mostly raised by their mother Melissa as their father was not around much. Diaz began training in karate and aikido from a young age and also participated in wrestling tournaments during his teenage years. Diaz attended Tokay High School in Lodi, California, for a year before dropping out. While a freshman, he was a member of the swim team. He started training in sambo at the age of 16 under Bulgarian National Sambo Champion Valeri Ignatov. Around the same time, after seeing Renzo Gracie in the Pride Fighting Championships, he started training mixed martial arts under Steve Heath at the Animal House gym before joining Cesar Gracie's team. He was promoted to black belt in Brazilian jiu-jitsu by Cesar Gracie on May 8, 2007.

Prior to his debut professional mixed martial arts fight, Diaz's girlfriend, Stephanie died by suicide by walking in front of traffic. After her death, Diaz would run to his girlfriend's grave every day to tell her he would become the fighter she always wanted him to be.

== Mixed martial arts career ==
=== Early career ===
Prior to his official professional debut, Diaz engaged in unsanctioned bare knuckle MMA matches. Diaz became a professional mixed martial arts fighter in 2001 just after his 18th birthday and won his first fight, submitting Mike Wick with a triangle choke at IFC Warriors Challenge 15. Diaz became a champion in his second professional fight, defeating Chris Lytle for the IFC Welterweight Championship in July 2002 at IFC Warriors Challenge 17.

Diaz was then invited to participate in Ultimate Athlete's King of the Mountain, a single-night tournament that took place two months later. He won his first two fights but eventually lost in the finals to Jeremy Jackson by TKO. Diaz fought in Warriors Quest and Shooto against Harris "Hitman" Sarmiento and Kuniyoshi Hironaka respectively before defending his IFC Welterweight Championship and winning the WEC Welterweight Championship in 2003 at WEC 6, submitting Joe Hurley with a kimura.

Diaz returned to defend his IFC Welterweight Championship against the man who defeated him one year earlier, Jeremy Jackson at IFC Warriors Challenge 18. This bout was for Diaz's IFC United States Welterweight Championship, Jackson's IFC Americas Welterweight Championship and the vacant ISKA-MMA Americas Welterweight Championship. Diaz won the rematch via TKO in the first round. Taking notice of his success, the UFC signed Diaz over the summer and he made his debut at UFC 44, completing the trilogy against Jackson and submitting him with an armbar in the last round of a back-and-forth fight that Diaz appeared to be winning on the scorecards.

=== Ultimate Fighting Championship ===
Diaz returned to the Octagon at UFC 47, set to take on future EliteXC Middleweight Champion Robbie Lawler. Lawler was a heavy favorite coming into the fight but it was Diaz who took the offensive, chasing Lawler around the cage for the majority of the bout. In the second round, Diaz taunted Lawler, who swung wildly and missed, allowing Diaz to connect with a right hook that knocked Lawler out. Diaz was then matched up with judoka Karo Parisyan at UFC 49, but ended up losing a hard-fought split decision. He rebounded with wins over submission specialist Drew Fickett at UFC 51 and Koji Oishi at UFC 53 before losing for the second time in the UFC at the hands of The Ultimate Fighter Middleweight winner Diego Sanchez at The Ultimate Fighter 2 Finale.

Diaz was confident coming into the bout but was unable to achieve success in the match, ultimately losing to Sanchez by unanimous decision. During the televised post-fight interview in the octagon, Diaz continued the controversy by declaring that he respected Sanchez fighting ability but did not think he deserved to be there, despite Sanchez's win. Diaz's next fight was against Joe Riggs at UFC 57. Similar to his treatment of Sanchez, Diaz made sure that he taunted his opponent plenty before their fight starting at the official press conference at the event in which Diaz confronted Riggs and the two exchanged words. They continued their conversation at the official weigh-ins in which both fighters had to be separated by UFC president Dana White and other officials present.

Riggs prevailed in a hard-fought battle, winning by unanimous decision and giving Diaz his second straight loss. After the fight, the two were taken to the hospital for observation and post-fight tests, where they had yet another scuffle. Diaz lost his third consecutive match in a unanimous decision to future UFC Lightweight Champion Sean Sherk at UFC 59.

=== Return to UFC ===
Diaz returned to his hometown of Stockton and participated in the International Cage Fighting Organization's inaugural event, defeating Ray Steinbeiss by unanimous decision. Diaz was slated to fight in his hometown again against Canadian John Alessio when he received an unexpected call the night before the fight from the UFC asking to fill in for an ill Thiago Alves at UFC 62.

After Alessio pulled out, Diaz took advantage of the opportunity, submitting veteran Josh Neer in the third round. Seemingly back in the UFC, Diaz stopped Brazilian newcomer Gleison Tibau with strikes in his next fight at UFC 65. However, even after the win and the reassurance that the UFC would give him another fight, Diaz decided to sign with the Gracie Fighting Championships and leave the UFC. GFC had Diaz scheduled to fight Thomas Denny in January 2007, but due to poor ticket sales the event was ultimately scrapped.

=== PRIDE FC ===
Diaz was signed to a two-fight deal with the PRIDE Fighting Championships with the first scheduled to be against Lightweight Champion Takanori Gomi in a non-title fight on February 24 in Las Vegas. PRIDE 33 was Diaz's first fight in the PRIDE organization and at the weight of 160 lb. While Gomi started the fight strongly, once knocking Diaz to the ground, twice ending up in his guard, and opening up cuts around both of Diaz's eyes, the Californian dominated the stand-up battle with his boxing. At the end of the first round, apparently due to poor cardio on Gomi's part, the Japanese fighter was clearly stunned, throwing much wilder punches and barely maintaining his defense. Early in the second round, the fight was stopped to check a cut suffered under Diaz's eye. The second round saw a continuation of wild punches by Gomi, then eventually taking the fight to the ground and leaving himself open to a Gogoplata submission by Diaz and tapping at 1:46 of the round. This was the second successful Gogoplata attempt in PRIDE's history (the first performed by future DREAM Lightweight Champion Shinya Aoki on Joachim Hansen less than two months earlier at PRIDE's New Year's event).

On April 10, 2007, the Nevada State Athletic Commission announced that Diaz failed the drug test that was taken shortly before his win over Gomi, testing positive for marijuana Metabolites. The NSAC declared the fight a "No Contest" and suspended him for 6 months with a fine of 20% of his earnings ($3,000) won from the fight against Gomi. The Commission felt that the result of Diaz's THC test, an enormous 175, was a contributing factor in his performance during the fight. Commission Chairman Dr. Tony Alamo said that while a result of 15 is considered positive, the NSAC has a threshold of 50 for athletes. He also believes they "feel very comfortable that everyone that tests positive in Nevada is truly positive." Dr. Alamo went on to say, "Mr. Diaz was 175. This creates a unique situation. I was there at this fight and believe that you were intoxicated and... that it made you numb to the pain. Did it help you win? I think it did." Despite Diaz being surrounded by other athletes and video cameras for several hours before the fight, Alamo gave no explanation for why he believed Diaz had used marijuana in the hours preceding the event. Diaz himself dismissed the assertion that marijuana was a Performance-enhancing drug, or that he was smoking it prior to the fight.

=== EliteXC ===
Diaz made his debut for EliteXC in Hawaii on September 15, 2007 on Showtime. He won a hard-fought split decision over his opponent Mike Aina. MMA Weekly reported that Nick Diaz signed a two-year deal with EliteXC and in his next fight, fought K. J. Noons for the vacant 160 pound title. Once the fight began, the two exchanged rather evenly on the feet until Noons dropped Diaz with a well timed right counterpunch. Diaz attempted several takedowns, all of which were stuffed by Noons, on one occasion with a swift right knee which opened up a notable gash on Diaz's face, eventually resulting in a loss via doctor stoppage due to multiple cuts on his forehead. A disappointed Diaz left the arena immediately and on his way out he flipped off the doctor from the arena entrance and shoved the camera out of his face.

After losing to Noons, Diaz had surgery and had the bone filed down on his eyebrows to mitigate any bad cuts in future bouts. Diaz came into his next fight at EliteXC's "Return of the KING" event in Honolulu, Hawaii against Muhsin Corbbrey 9 pounds over the weight limit. Diaz earned a tough win over Corbbrey, following the main event an altercation between Nick and his brother Nate broke out with K. J. Noons and his corner. EliteXC executives asked Diaz to come to the ring and make a statement about a possible title rematch with Noons. Noons, a native of Hawaii, asked the crowd their opinion, resulting in an echo of boos for Diaz. After Nick spoke over the microphone to Noons, saying, "don't be scared homie," Karl Noons, K. J.'s father, lunged at him prompting Nate Diaz to throw a water bottle at Karl. The Diaz brothers were quickly escorted out of the cage by a group of security staff. During interviews the next day Nick claimed Karl was intoxicated and overreacting. Meanwhile, Karl claimed his incident was prompted by the thrown bottle. Video replay of the event showed Nate throwing the bottle after Karl jumped at Nick. No one was injured as the Diaz brothers left the arena entrance "flipping the bird" to the fans and Noons's corner.

Nick went on to face Thomas Denny. After a sluggish start to the fight, Diaz found his range and dominated Denny during the latter half of the first round. Diaz continued to keep the fight standing and maintained a high-paced tempo for the remainder of the fight, earning an impressive knockout victory over the veteran Denny 0:30 into round two. Diaz was rumoured to have a rematch against the current EliteXC Lightweight Champion K. J. Noons, airing on CBS October 4, 2008. However, Noons and his camp refused to accept the match. Mark Dion, Noon's manager was quoted as saying, "As far as Nick Diaz, he's not the No. 1 contender out there." Diaz was scheduled to face Eddie Alvarez for the EliteXC 160 pound title on November 8, 2008 before the company ceased operations.

=== Strikeforce and DREAM ===
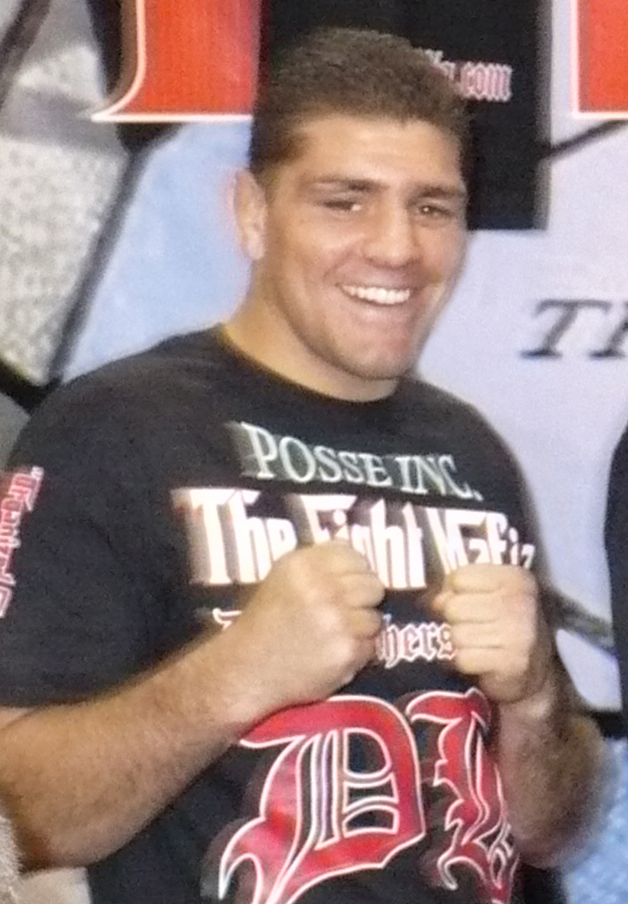
Diaz in 2009.

Diaz was victorious in DREAM 3, defeating Katsuya Inoue by TKO in the first round. With Strikeforce's acquisition of ProElite's assets, CEO Scott Coker had announced that Nick would face off against MMA legend Frank Shamrock at a Catchweight of 179 lb, at their upcoming event, Strikeforce: Shamrock vs. Diaz, in Shamrock's hometown of San Jose on April 11, 2009 at the HP Pavilion. Nick was successful in the fight, defeating Shamrock via TKO due to strikes in the second round. Throughout the fight, Diaz was dominant in all areas using effective positioning on the ground, once mounting Frank in the end of the first round, before finally finishing the fight in the second round with a body shot that crumpled Frank to the mat and follow up punches before referee John McCarthy called a halt to the bout. In the interview he stated "It's hard to hate the guy, he's been doing what I've been wanting to do and saying what I've wanted to say for a long time".

At Strikeforce: Lawler vs. Shields Diaz met former UFC veteran Scott Smith at a Catchweight of 180 pounds. Although Smith took Diaz down once in the first round, Diaz controlled the majority of the bout with his superior boxing, utilizing his reach, stalking jabs and repeatedly punishing Smith with hooks to the body, twice dropping him in the second and third round. Upon landing the body shot that dropped Smith in the third round, Smith assumed a "turtle" position and Diaz took his back until securing a rear-naked choke to finish the bout at 1:41 of the final round.

It was announced that Diaz would be fighting Joe Riggs at Strikeforce: Carano vs. Cyborg taking place on August 15, in which would have been a rematch of their first fight that took place at UFC 57: Couture vs Liddell 3, in which both fighters fought in the cage and then again at the local hospital later in the evening. The fight would have been for the Strikeforce Welterweight Championship but, Riggs had to pull out of the bout due to an adverse reaction to a drug. Diaz was then scheduled to instead face former IFL Welterweight Champion Jay Hieron for the Welterweight Championship. This fight has since been canceled due to Diaz's failure to attain his license after not attending a pre-fight drug test. Jesse Taylor replaced Diaz and the title was no longer on the line, Hieron defeated Taylor by unanimous decision.

Diaz faced Strikeforce newcomer and then-DREAM Welterweight Champion Marius Žaromskis to crown the first Strikeforce Welterweight Champion on January 30, 2010 at Strikeforce: Miami. Žaromskis came out aggressively and the two men exchanged on the feet until Diaz tied his opponent up in the clinch and landed numerous knees to Žaromskis' right leg. Diaz then scored a takedown and looked for a guillotine choke – quickly shrugged off by his opponent. The two men continued to exchange, with Diaz utilizing his unorthodox boxing skills, until rocked by a Žaromskis left hook and falling to his back. Žaromskis landed few effective shots while Diaz was "turtled" on the floor, allowing him to recover and stand back up. In the few remaining minutes, Diaz opened up with his boxing range, tagging Žaromskis cleanly several times with combos composed of jabs, hooks and seamless bodyshots; forcing him against the side of the cage where he landed a solid uppercut that dropped his opponent leading to the referee to stop the contest at 4:38 of the first round. Diaz was then crowned the inaugural Strikeforce Welterweight Champion.

Diaz defeated former PRIDE veteran Hayato Sakurai by armbar submission in a non-title bout at DREAM 14. Diaz defeated K. J. Noons in a rematch of their 2007 bout for the Strikeforce Welterweight Championship. Diaz won via unanimous decision (48–47, 49–47, and 49–46). Diaz defeated Brazilian Evangelista Santos who had an 18–13 MMA record going into the bout on January 29, 2011 at Strikeforce: Diaz vs. Cyborg via armbar in the second round. Diaz defeated English fighter Paul Daley at Strikeforce: Diaz vs. Daley via TKO (punches) at 4:57 of round 1, and became the first Strikeforce fighter to successfully defend the Strikeforce Welterweight Champion three consecutive times.

=== Second return to UFC ===
UFC president Dana White stated that a matchup between Diaz and UFC Welterweight Champion Georges St-Pierre was a possible consideration. Diaz and St-Pierre were rumored to be the next coaches for The Ultimate Fighter 14 reality show, but the show debuted on September 21, 2011, with Michael Bisping and Jason Miller as coaches. White later confirmed via Twitter that Diaz would face St-Pierre at UFC 137 at the Mandalay Bay Event Center in Las Vegas, Nevada, on October 29, 2011. Nick Diaz vacated his Strikeforce Welterweight Championship title prior to his bout with Georges St-Pierre. Dana White made the decision to take Diaz out of the fight and replace him with former WEC Welterweight Champion and future UFC Interim Welterweight Champion Carlos Condit, due to Diaz missing multiple flights for a press event to support the fight. It was announced that Diaz would fight B.J. Penn in the main event at his original fight card, UFC 137. Diaz won via unanimous decision. Diaz called out St-Pierre in the post-fight interview, who was scheduled to fight Condit at the same event but had been forced out of the bout with a knee injury.

Following his successful return, Diaz was expected to face Georges St-Pierre for the UFC Welterweight Championship at UFC 143 during Super Bowl weekend. However, due to an ACL injury sustained by St-Pierre, Diaz faced Carlos Condit in the main event, with the winner being awarded an Interim UFC Welterweight Championship. Condit defeated Diaz via unanimous decision. Upset with the result of the fight, Diaz indicated that he was retiring from the sport.

After the event UFC President Dana White said that he believed Diaz would fight again. Diaz was briefly linked to a rematch with Condit, but was quickly refuted when Diaz tested positive for marijuana metabolites in a post-fight drug test. The Nevada State Athletic Commission temporarily suspended Diaz shortly after the positive test, pending a full disciplinary hearing.

It was announced at the hearing in May 2012 that Diaz was suspended for one year, retroactive to February 4, 2012, and fined 30 percent of his fight purse earned from the Condit bout. Diaz was eligible to return to MMA competition in February 2013.

Diaz faced Georges St-Pierre at UFC 158 on March 16, 2013 for the UFC Welterweight Championship. He lost the fight via unanimous decision.

As of July 28, 2013, Diaz had once again retired from MMA competition, though Dana White stated in interviews that he felt that Diaz was simply on hiatus, financially sound from the GSP fight, but did expect him to return eventually.

A possible Middleweight matchup between Michael Bisping and Nick Diaz was briefly linked, but soon turned down by Diaz. At UFC on Fox 9 in Sacramento, Dana White offered Diaz a rematch with Carlos Condit; Diaz turned it down. Diaz attended UFC 170 and had told media that he would return if he could get an immediate title shot.

On July 24, 2014, it was announced that Diaz had signed a three-fight contract to return to the UFC. Diaz faced Anderson Silva on January 31, 2015 at UFC 183. He lost the fight by unanimous decision. A few days after the fight, the UFC revealed that Diaz had once again failed his post-fight drug test for marijuana metabolites, and Silva tested positive on January 9 for drostanolone, androstane, oxazepam, and temazepam in pre-fight drug screening. On August 13, after several reschedules, Silva's disciplinary hearing was held to decide on the subject. Silva's defense argued that a tainted sexual enhancement supplement was the root of the two failed tests for drostanolone and also appealed to mistakes in the NSAC testing procedures, pointing to a pair of drug tests, one on Jan 19 and one after the fight, which Silva passed. He admitted to using both temazepam and oxazepam, benzodiazepines, the night prior to the fight as therapy to control stress and help him sleep. Silva's team was unable to explain the presence of androsterone in the Jan 9 test. The commission rejected the defense and suspended him for one year retroactive to the date of the fight, as the current guidelines were not in effect at the time of the failed tests. Silva was also fined his full win bonus, as well as 30% of his show money, totaling $380,000. The result of the bout was changed to a no contest. At that point, Diaz had accumulated a UFC record of 7 wins, 6 losses and 1 no contest, with no successful challenges for a title.

On September 14, 2015 the Nevada State Athletic Commission suspended Diaz for 5 years and fined him $165,000 following his failed drug test of marijuana metabolites at UFC 183. Following his appeal four months later in January 2016, the suspension and fine were reduced to 18 months and $100,000. The suspension was officially lifted on August 1, 2016. Diaz had served a technical suspension due to outstanding fines with the NSAC as stipulated in his settlement claim. For this reason he was unable to corner Nate Diaz during UFC 196 and UFC 202. Diaz, according to sources, has reached an agreement with the Nevada Athletic Commission, which now frees him to participate in all combat sport-related activities in the state once again. On April 9, 2018, Diaz accepted a one-year USADA sanction for failing to report his whereabouts to USADA on three occasions from the third quarter of 2016 to the first quarter of 2017. The sanction is retroactive to April 9, 2017, and Diaz would be eligible to compete again on April 9, 2018.

After a long hiatus since 2015, Diaz returned to rematch against Robbie Lawler on September 25, 2021 at UFC 266. The bout was contested at middleweight and was a special non-title, non-main event five round bout. After a back-and-forth fight, Diaz was knocked down with punches in round three, but was given the opportunity to return to his feet. Diaz stayed down and verbally submitted resulting in a TKO loss.

After a three-year absence, Diaz was scheduled to face Vicente Luque on August 3, 2024 at UFC on ABC 7. However, due to travel issues, the bout was postponed and was scheduled to take place on December 7, 2024 at UFC 310. In turn, Diaz withdrew from the bout for unknown reasons and was replaced by Themba Gorimbo.

== Professional grappling career ==
Diaz was scheduled to compete against Georges St-Pierre in a grappling match at UFC Fight Pass Invitational event on December 14, 2023 but the match was postponed due to injury.

== Personal life ==
Diaz currently teaches Brazilian jiu-jitsu with his brother Nate in Lodi, California. Both Diaz brothers are advocates for cannabis.

Diaz appears in the feature-length documentary Fight Life (2013), which chronicles the lives of mixed martial artists outside the cage; the film is directed by independent filmmaker James Z. Feng and won the Best Documentary Award at the United Film Festival.

In 2023, Diaz starred in the film Darkness of Man with Jean-Claude Van Damme, directed by James Cullen Bressack.

== Promoting career ==
=== WAR MMA ===
On June 22, 2013 Diaz launched the MMA promotion WAR MMA. The first event took place on June 22, 2013 in Stockton, California, headlined by Diaz's teammate Daniel Roberts against Justin Baesman.

== Controversies ==
=== Strikeforce: Nashville brawl ===
On April 17, 2010, following Jake Shields's victory over Dan Henderson at Strikeforce: Nashville, Jason "Mayhem" Miller entered the cage, without proper approval, during Shields's post-fight interview. During that interview, Miller interrupted and bumped into Shields and asked "Where's my rematch, buddy?" Gilbert Melendez responded by putting a hand on Miller's shoulder to tell him to back up. Miller followed this up by attempting to shove Melendez which led to Melendez shoving him backwards. Nick, his brother Nate, and the rest of the Cesar Gracie fight team rushed in and attacked Miller. Miller was thrown to the mat and beaten. The fight was eventually broken up by referees, members of Henderson's corner and the promoter's security personnel. Miller and five other participants in the brawl were each given three-month suspensions, and fines ranging between $5,000 and $7,500.

Following the events of the Nashville Brawl, Miller expressed an interest in fighting Nick Diaz. The 170 lb Diaz refused stating he was the Strikeforce Welterweight Champion and needed to continue to fight at that weight. He requested Miller move down to 170 lb to fight him. Miller continued to attempt to set up a fight, offering 183 lb as a catchweight. Diaz counter-offered a catchweight of 181 lb. Scott Coker, CEO of Strikeforce was interested in setting up the fight, but failed to do so as Zuffa took over Strikeforce.

=== Braulio Estima incidents ===
Diaz was set to take on Braulio Estima in a grappling match at the World Jiu-Jitsu Expo on May 12, 2012. However, Diaz no-showed the event. In the hours following the event, Diaz was seen liking a YouTube video featuring Estima's reaction on Diaz's no-show, calling it "disrespectful". The day after the event Diaz alleged that Estima failed to make weight within the agreed upon timeframe prior to the fight and also alleged that the promoters of the World Jiu-Jitsu Expo failed to make good on their claims of donating proceeds from the fight to charity.

After UFC 158, Estima, who was a training partner for Georges St-Pierre, attempted to shake Diaz's hand immediately after the fight. Diaz did actually accept the handshake but shoved Estima away when he attempted to embrace him. According to Estima, Kron Gracie was antagonizing him along with Diaz.

=== Domestic violence case ===
On May 24, 2018, Diaz was arrested and charged with two counts of domestic battery; a felony for strangulation as well as a misdemeanor battery charge. On August 30, 2018, it was revealed that the charges against Diaz were dismissed in July 2018 when a grand jury opted not to indict Diaz after there were inconsistencies found with the complainant's story.

== Fighting style ==
Diaz is a Brazilian jiu-jitsu black belt under Cesar Gracie whom he has been training with since he was a teenager. He is accomplished in both gi and no-gi jiu-jitsu. Some of the major titles he has won include the US Purple Belt Open in 2004 and a Pan-American Brown Belt Medium Weight Division title in 2005. He also owns a victory over renowned grappler Jorge Patino in competition via kneebar. He is known for having a modified BJJ style that suits his MMA career very well. Diaz lists his favorite submission as the kimura.

Diaz is also a professional boxer and fights in the Super Middleweight weight class. He made his professional debut in April 2005 against Alfonso Rocha at the Radisson Hotel in Sacramento, California. Diaz was victorious, winning by unanimous decision after four rounds. He has not fought since. Nick and Nate Diaz were trained by former WBA and WBC World Champion Luisito Espinosa and trained with Jason "Gumby" Schrumpf. He also trains in sambo with former UFC fighter Val Ignatov.

Diaz displays an unusual boxing style for MMA, relying upon volume punching without full power and occasionally adding in hard punches. CompuStrike, which tabulates statistics from MMA fights, has shown him attempting 181 strikes in one round, making it the most total strikes thrown in any round that CompuStrike has recorded.

Diaz is known for talking trash to his opponents during fights, competes in triathlons for recreation and uses his endurance to constantly put pressure on his opponent, as well as pushing the pace of the fight. Diaz has said, "Fighters are afraid of conditioning, they are afraid of getting tired, but I don’t want to have anxiety or be afraid of anything. I can go 100 percent out there and never have to worry about getting tired. Everybody says fighting is 90 percent mental, and it's true. Knowing you can go 15 minutes or 25 minutes without any problem can help you sustain that mental advantage over your opponent..."

== Pay-per-view bouts ==
No.	Event	Fight	Date	Venue	City	PPV buys
1.	UFC 137	Penn vs. Diaz	October 29, 2011	Mandalay Bay Events Center	Las Vegas, Nevada, U.S.	280,000
2.	UFC 143	Diaz vs. Condit	February 4, 2012	Mandalay Bay Events Center	Las Vegas, Nevada, U.S.	400,000
3.	UFC 158	St-Pierre vs. Diaz	March 16, 2013	Bell Centre	Montreal, Quebec, Canada	950,000
4.	UFC 183	Silva vs. Diaz	January 31, 2015	MGM Grand Garden Arena	Las Vegas, Nevada, U.S.	650,000
Total sales						2,280,000

== Championships and accomplishments ==
=== Mixed martial arts ===
- Ultimate Fighting Championship
  - Fight of the Night (One time) vs. B.J. Penn
  - Submission of the Night (One time) vs. Josh Neer
  - UFC Encyclopedia Awards
    - Knockout of the Night (One time) vs. Robbie Lawler 1
    - Submission of the Night (One time) vs. Jeremy Jackson
  - UFC.com Awards
    - 2005: Ranked #5 Fight of the Year vs. Diego Sanchez
    - 2011: Ranked #6 Fighter of the Year (Tied with Dan Henderson)
- Strikeforce
  - Strikeforce Welterweight Championship (One time; First)
  - Most successful welterweight title defenses in Strikeforce (Three)
  - Most consecutive welterweight title defenses in Strikeforce (Three)
  - 2010 Fight of the Year vs. K. J. Noons on October 9
- World Extreme Cagefighting
  - WEC Welterweight Championship (One time; First)
- International Sport Karate Association
  - ISKA MMA Americas Welterweight Championship (One time)
- International Fighting Championship
  - IFC U.S. Welterweight Championship (One time)
  - One successful title defense
  - IFC Americas Welterweight Championship (One time)
- Ultimate Athlete
  - UA 4 Welterweight Tournament Runner-Up
- Sherdog
  - 2011 Round of the Year vs. Paul Daley on April 9; Round 1
  - 2011 All-Violence First Team
- Inside Fights
  - 2007 Fight of the Year vs. Takanori Gomi on February 24
- Bleacher Report
  - 2015 Quote of the Year: "Fifth Amendment"
- FIGHT! Magazine
  - 2007 Submission of the Year vs. Takanori Gomi at Pride 33

=== Submission grappling ===
- US Brazilian Jiu-Jitsu Open
  - 2004 Purple Belt Gold Medalist
- Pan-American Championship Jiu Jitsu
  - 2005 Brown Belt (Middle): 1st Place
  - 2005 Brown Belt (Open): 3rd Place

== Mixed martial arts record ==
Professional record breakdown
39 matches	27 wins	10 losses
By knockout	14	3
By submission	8	0
By decision	5	7
No contests	2	

Res.	Record	Opponent	Method	Event	Date	Round	Time	Location	Notes
Loss	26–10 (2)	Robbie Lawler	TKO (retirement)	UFC 266	September 25, 2021	3	0:44	Las Vegas, Nevada, United States	
NC	26–9 (2)	Anderson Silva	NC (overturned by NSAC)	UFC 183	January 31, 2015	5	5:00	Las Vegas, Nevada, United States	Middleweight debut. Originally a unanimous decision win for Silva; overturned after he tested positive for drostanolone and androsterone. Diaz also tested positive for elevated marijuana metabolites.
Loss	26–9 (1)	Georges St-Pierre	Decision (unanimous)	UFC 158	March 16, 2013	5	5:00	Montreal, Quebec, Canada	For the UFC Welterweight Championship.
Loss	26–8 (1)	Carlos Condit	Decision (unanimous)	UFC 143	February 4, 2012	5	5:00	Las Vegas, Nevada, United States	For the interim UFC Welterweight Championship. Diaz tested positive for marijuana.
Win	26–7 (1)	B.J. Penn	Decision (unanimous)	UFC 137	October 29, 2011	3	5:00	Las Vegas, Nevada, United States	Fight of the Night.
Win	25–7 (1)	Paul Daley	TKO (punches)	Strikeforce: Diaz vs. Daley	April 9, 2011	1	4:57	San Diego, California, United States	Defended the Strikeforce Welterweight Championship. Diaz vacated the title on June 9, 2011 when his contract was absorbed by the UFC.
Win	24–7 (1)	Evangelista Santos	Submission (armbar)	Strikeforce: Diaz vs. Cyborg	January 29, 2011	2	4:50	San Jose, California, United States	Defended the Strikeforce Welterweight Championship.
Win	23–7 (1)	K. J. Noons	Decision (unanimous)	Strikeforce: Diaz vs. Noons II	October 9, 2010	5	5:00	San Jose, California United States	Defended the Strikeforce Welterweight Championship.
Win	22–7 (1)	Hayato Sakurai	Submission (armbar)	Dream 14	May 29, 2010	1	3:54	Saitama, Japan	
Win	21–7 (1)	Marius Žaromskis	TKO (punches)	Strikeforce: Miami	January 30, 2010	1	4:35	Sunrise, Florida, United States	Won the inaugural Strikeforce Welterweight Championship.
Win	20–7 (1)	Scott Smith	Submission (rear-naked choke)	Strikeforce: Lawler vs. Shields	June 6, 2009	3	1:41	St. Louis, Missouri, United States	Catchweight (180 lb) bout.
Win	19–7 (1)	Frank Shamrock	TKO (punches)	Strikeforce: Shamrock vs. Diaz	April 11, 2009	2	3:57	San Jose, California, United States	Catchweight (180 lb) bout.
Win	18–7 (1)	Thomas Denny	TKO (punches)	EliteXC: Unfinished Business	July 26, 2008	2	0:30	Stockton, California, United States	Lightweight bout.
Win	17–7 (1)	Muhsin Corbbrey	TKO (punches)	EliteXC: Return of the King	June 14, 2008	3	3:59	Honolulu, Hawaii, United States	
Win	16–7 (1)	Katsuya Inoue	TKO (corner stoppage)	Dream 3	May 11, 2008	1	6:45	Saitama, Japan	Return to Welterweight.
Loss	15–7 (1)	K. J. Noons	TKO (doctor stoppage)	EliteXC: Renegade	November 10, 2007	1	5:00	Corpus Christi, Texas, United States	For the inaugural EliteXC Lightweight Championship.
Win	15–6 (1)	Mike Aina	Decision (split)	EliteXC: Uprising	September 15, 2007	3	5:00	Honolulu, Hawaii, United States	
NC	14–6 (1)	Takanori Gomi	NC (overturned by NSAC)	PRIDE 33	February 24, 2007	2	1:46	Las Vegas, Nevada, United States	Return to Lightweight. Originally a submission (gogoplata) win for Diaz; overturned after he tested positive for marijuana.
Win	14–6	Gleison Tibau	TKO (punches)	UFC 65	November 18, 2006	2	2:27	Sacramento, California, United States	
Win	13–6	Josh Neer	Submission (kimura)	UFC 62	August 26, 2006	3	1:42	Las Vegas, Nevada, United States	Submission of the Night.
Win	12–6	Ray Steinbeiss	Decision (unanimous)	International Cage Fighting Organization 1	May 13, 2006	3	5:00	Stockton, California, United States	
Loss	11–6	Sean Sherk	Decision (unanimous)	UFC 59	April 15, 2006	3	5:00	Anaheim, California, United States	
Loss	11–5	Joe Riggs	Decision (unanimous)	UFC 57	February 4, 2006	3	5:00	Las Vegas, Nevada, United States	
Loss	11–4	Diego Sanchez	Decision (unanimous)	The Ultimate Fighter 2 Finale	November 5, 2005	3	5:00	Las Vegas, Nevada, United States	
Win	11–3	Koji Oishi	KO (punches)	UFC 53	June 4, 2005	1	1:24	Atlantic City, New Jersey, United States	
Win	10–3	Drew Fickett	TKO (punches)	UFC 51	February 5, 2005	1	4:40	Las Vegas, Nevada, United States	
Loss	9–3	Karo Parisyan	Decision (split)	UFC 49	August 21, 2004	3	5:00	Las Vegas, Nevada, United States	
Win	9–2	Robbie Lawler	KO (punch)	UFC 47	April 2, 2004	2	1:31	Las Vegas, Nevada, United States	
Win	8–2	Jeremy Jackson	Submission (armbar)	UFC 44	September 26, 2003	3	2:04	Las Vegas, Nevada, United States	
Win	7–2	Jeremy Jackson	TKO (punches)	IFC Warriors Challenge 18	July 19, 2003	1	4:33	Lakeport, California, United States	
Win	6–2	Joe Hurley	Submission (kimura)	WEC 6	March 27, 2003	1	1:55	Lemoore, California, United States	Won the inaugural WEC Welterweight Championship. Diaz vacated the title to focus on fight for the UFC.
Loss	5–2	Kuniyoshi Hironaka	Decision (split)	Shooto: Year End Show 2002	December 14, 2002	3	5:00	Chiba, Japan	
Win	5–1	Harris Sarmiento	TKO (corner stoppage)	Warriors Quest 8	October 24, 2002	2	1:47	Honolulu, Hawaii, United States	
Loss	4–1	Jeremy Jackson	TKO (punches)	Ultimate Athlete 4: King of the Mountain	September 28, 2002	1	0:49	Auberry, California, United States	Ultimate Athlete Welterweight Tournament Final.
Win	4–0	Adam Lynn	Submission (armbar)	Ultimate Athlete 4: King of the Mountain	September 28, 2002	1	2:51	Auberry, California, United States	Ultimate Athlete Welterweight Tournament Semifinal.
Win	3–0	Blaine Tyler	TKO (punches)	Ultimate Athlete 4: King of the Mountain	September 28, 2002	2	2:01	Auberry, California, United States	Ultimate Athlete Welterweight Tournament Quarterfinal.
Win	2–0	Chris Lytle	Decision (unanimous)	IFC Warriors Challenge 17	July 12, 2002	3	5:00	Porterville, California, United States	Welterweight debut. Won the IFC United States Welterweight Championship.
Win	1–0	Mike Wick	Submission (triangle choke)	IFC Warriors Challenge 15	August 31, 2001	1	3:43	Oroville, California, United States	Lightweight debut.

== Professional boxing record ==
1 fight	1 win	0 losses
By decision	1	0

No.	Result	Record	Opponent	Method	Round, time	Date	Location	Notes
1	Win	1–0	(United States) Alfonso Rocha	UD	4	Apr 29, 2005	(United States) Radisson Hotel, Sacramento, California, U.S.	

== See also ==
- Cannabis and sports
- List of male boxers
- List of male mixed martial artists
- List of mixed martial artists with professional boxing records
- List of multi-sport athletes
- List of Strikeforce alumni

New championship	1st WEC Welterweight Champion; March 27, 2003 – October 2003	Vacant Title next held by Shonie Carter
New championship	1st Strikeforce Welterweight Champion; January 30, 2010 – June 9, 2011	Vacant Title next held by Nate Marquardt
