= Dominic Napare =

Ghanaian politician (born 1960)

Hon. Dominic Napare
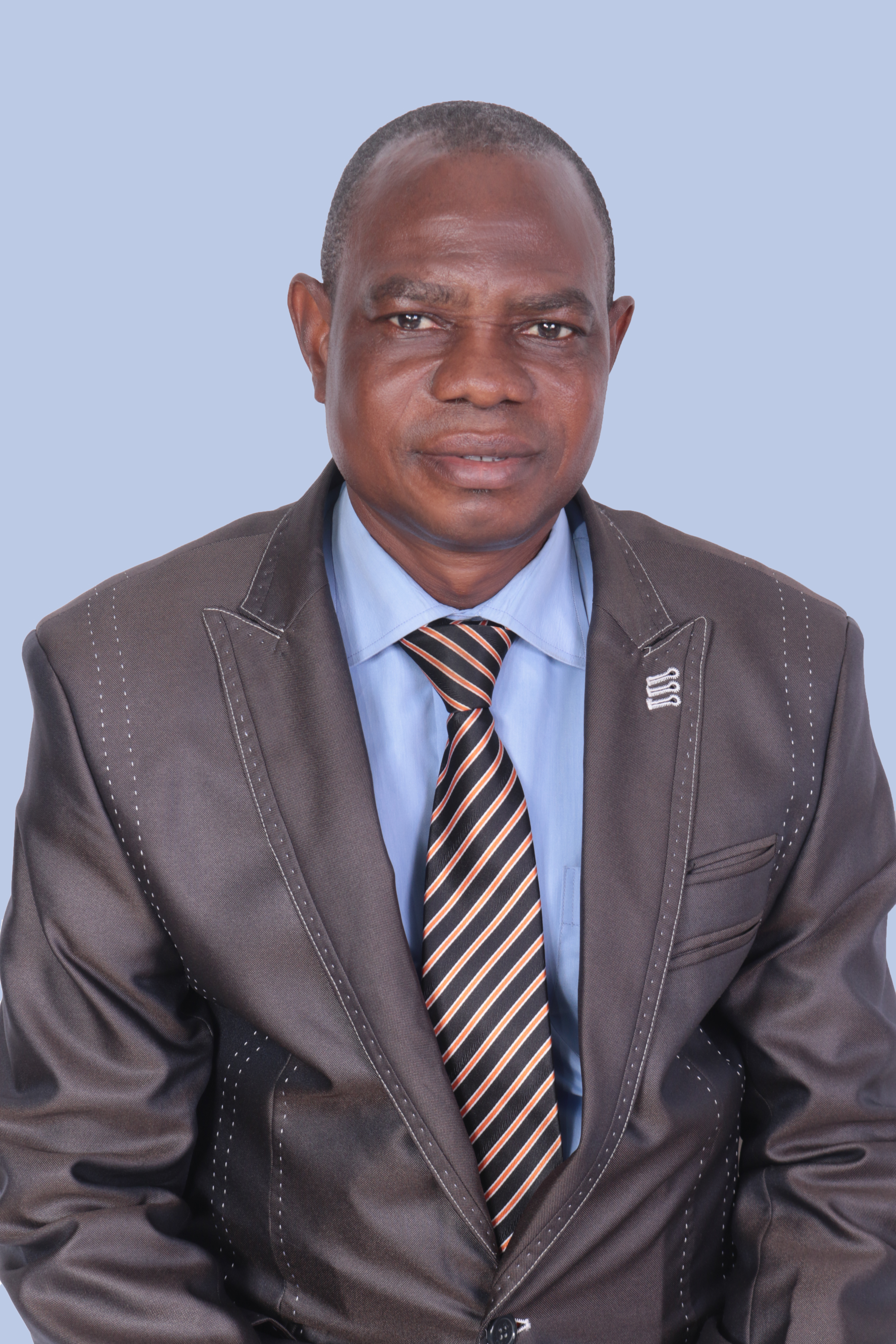

Member of Parliament for Sene East Constituency
- Incumbent
- Assumed office 7 January 2013

Personal details
- Born: Dominic Napare; 3 November 1960 (age 65) Kajaji, Ghana
- Party: National Democratic Congress
- Education: University of Education, Winneba
- Occupation: Politician
- Profession: Educationist
- Committees: Poverty Reduction Strategy Committee (Vice Chairperson); House Committee; Privileges Committee; Local Government and Rural Development Committee

Dominic Napare (born 3 November 1960) is a Ghanaian politician and member of the sixth parliament of the 4th Republic of Ghana, Seventh Parliament of the Fourth Republic of Ghana and member of the Eighth Parliament of the Fourth Republic of Ghana representing the Sene East Constituency in the Bono East Region on the ticket of the National Democratic Congress.

== Personal life ==
Napare is a Christian (Catholic). He is married, with four children.

== Early life and education ==
Napare was born on 3 November 1960. He hails from Kajaji, a town in the Bono East Region of Ghana. He entered University of Education, Winneba, where he obtained his Bachelor of Education degree in Management and Secretarial Studies.

== Politics ==
Napare is a member of the National Democratic Congress (NDC). In 2012, he contested the Sene East seat on the ticket of the NDC sixth parliament of the fourth republic and won.

=== 2012 election ===
Napare was first elected as a member of parliament for Sene East constituency on the ticket of the National Democratic Congress during the 2012 Ghanaian general election. He was elected with 10,343 votes, representing 66.93% of the total votes over Abdulai Mohammed Belinyi of the New Patriotic Party, who polled 4, 937 votes which is equivalent to 31.95% and the parliamentary candidate for the Progressive People's Party Ferka Yamba Richard had 173 votes representing 1.12% of the total votes.

=== 2016 election ===
Napare contested the Sene East constituency parliamentary seat on the ticket of the National Democratic Congress during the 2016 Ghanaian general election and won with 9,936 votes representing 67.07% of the total votes. He was elected over Mbanyie Abraham Kwadwo of the New Patriotic Party, who polled 4,694 votes, equivalent to 31.68% of the total, and parliamentary candidate for the Convention People's Party Kofi Faasomaye had 185 votes, representing 1.25% of the total votes.

=== 2020 elections ===
Napare was again elected member of parliament for Sene East in the 2020 Ghanaian general election. He was declared winner in the parliamentary elections after obtaining 13,401 votes, representing 64.4% against his closest contender the New Patriotic Party candidate Luchoun Nicholas Bitagan, who had 7,424 votes, representing 35.7%.

=== Committees ===
Napare is the Vice Chairperson of the Poverty Reduction Strategy Committee; member of the House Committee; member of the Privileges Committee; and also a member of the Local Government and Rural Development Committee.

== Employment ==
- District Chief Executive (DCE) (Sene East District), 28 April 2009 – 2012.
- Member of Parliament (7 January 2013–present; 2nd term)
- Educationist

== Philanthropy ==
In 2021, Napare presented motorcycles to three police stations in his constituency.
