= Kwame Twumasi Ampofo =

Ghanaian politician

Hon. Kwame Twumasi Ampofo MP
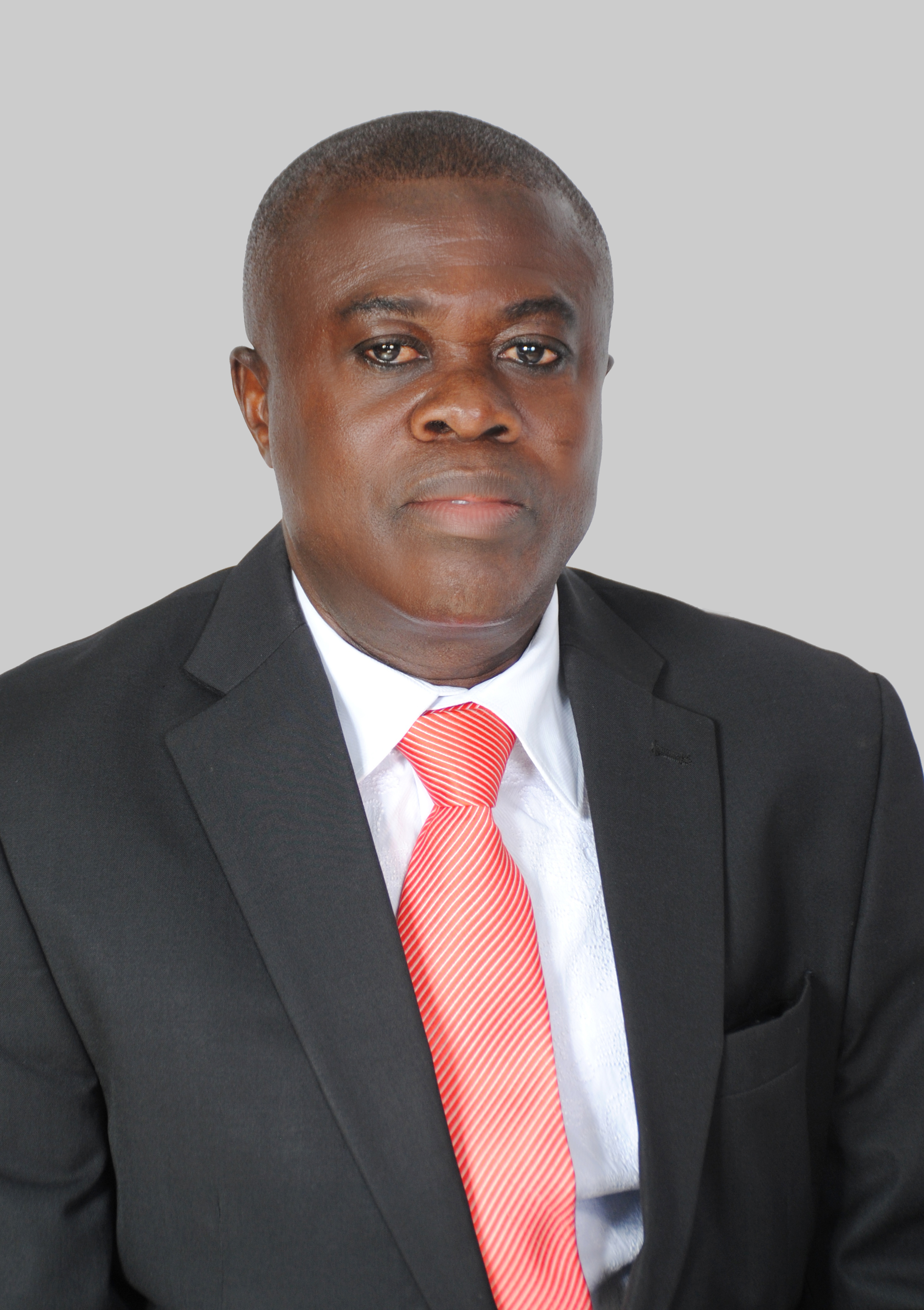

Member of Ghana Parliament for Sene West
- Incumbent
- Assumed office 7 January 2013
- President: John Dramani Mahama

Personal details
- Born: 6 March 1968 (age 58) Kwame Danso, Ghana)
- Party: National Democratic Congress
- Education: Essex County College
- Occupation: Politician
- Profession: Health worker
- Committees: Government Assurance Committee; Works and Housing Committee

Kwame Twumasi Ampofo (born 3 June 1968) is a Ghanaian politician and a current member of the 7th Parliament of the 4th Republic of Ghana and a member of the Eighth Parliament of the Fourth Republic of Ghana representing the Sene West Constituency in the Bono East Region of Ghana on the ticket of the National Democratic Congress (NDC).

== Early life and education ==
Ampofo was born on 6 March 1968 in Kwame Danso, a town in the Bono East Region of Ghana. He attended the Essex County College, NJ, USA, 2005 and offered BSC in Business Management.

== Politics ==
Ampofo is a member of the National Democratic Congress (NDC).

=== 2012 elections ===
He was first elected into Parliament during the 2012 Ghanaian general election as a member of Parliament for the Sene West Constituency in the Bono East Region of Ghana. During the elections, he polled 12,511 votes out of the 19,504 valid votes cast representing 64.14%.

=== 2016 elections ===
He contested again in the 2016 Ghanaian general elections and polled 10,229 votes making 51.86% of the total votes cast whilst the NPP parliamentary candidate Joseph Mackay Kumah had 8,747 making 44.3% of the total votes cast, the PPP parliamentary candidate Dramani Manu had 565 votes making 2.9% of the total votes and the CPP parliamentary candidate Daniyawu Mohammed had 184 votes making 0.9% of the total votes cast.

=== 2020 elections ===
He again contested in the 2020 Ghanaian general election and polled 13,116 votes whilst the NPP parliamentary candidate Joseph Markay Kumah had 13,100 votes.

=== Committees ===
Ampofo is a member of the Government Assurance Committee and also a member of the Works and Housing Committee.

== Career ==
Ampofo worked as the managing director at Premier Pharmaceuticals from 2006 to 2012. He also worked as the Assistant Managing Director at Ghana Oil Premier Pharmaceuticals from 2003 to 2006. He was a teacher for the Ghana Education Service from 1993 to 1995. He was also the Deputy Minister of Education. He is the current member of parliament for the Sene West Constituency (from 2012 to date).

== Personal life ==
He is married with three children. He is a Christian and a member of the Seventh-Day Adventist Church.
