= Felix Twumasi-Appiah =

Ghanaian politician

Hon. Felix Twumasi-Appiah

Member of Parliament for Member of Parliament for MP for Sene
- In office 7 January 2009 – 6 January 2013
- President: John Atta Mills; John Mahama
- Succeeded by: Kwame Twumasi Ampofo

Member of Parliament for MP for Sene
- In office 7 January 2005 – 6 January 2009
- President: John Kufuor

Member of Parliament for MP for Sene
- In office 7 January 2001 – 6 January 2005
- President: John Kufuor
- Preceded by: Yaw Nana Otto

Personal details
- Born: 30 August 1968 (age 58)
- Party: National Democratic Congress
- Children: 2
- Education: Institute of Maritime Studies, Havana, Cuba
- Profession: Manager/Administrator
- Committees: Chairman – Communications committee; Ranking Member Government Assurances committee; Member - Appointments committee; Member, Roads & Transport committee; Member - Defense & Interior committee; Member - Health committee Business Committee of the House

Felix Twumasi-Appiah (born 30 August 1968) is a Ghanaian politician and also a manager and an administrator.

== Early life and education ==
Twumasi Appiah was born at Wiase in the Sene District in the Brong Ahafo Region of Ghana. He attended the Institute of Maritime Studies in Havana, Cuba where he earned a Bsc.(Hons.) in Exploitation of Maritime Transportation.

== Professional life ==
Twumasi is a manager and administrator. He has worked as a corporate consultant at Ta&a, as a management consultant at Medivac(GH) Ltd., as a senior partner in the investment consultancy Westgate Investments Ltd. and as a manager in charge of shipping and procurement at Reha-Medical Supply. Before these he had worked as the executive chairman of a travel and tours establishment - Transtour(GH) Ltd, as a cargo/warehouse superintendent of AFGO(K.I.A) and as an operations coordinator at the Ghana Ports and Harbour Authority. He is speaks both English and Spanish.

== Political life ==
He was a Member of Parliament for Sene constituency, which was later renamed to Sene West constituency, from 2000 to 2012 as a member of the National Democratic Congress (NDC). As a result, he was the Member of Parliament for the Sene constituency for the 4th and 5th parliaments of the 4th Republic of Ghana.

== Elections ==
=== 2000 Elections ===
In the year 2000, Twumasi-Appiah won the Ghanaian general elections as the member of parliament for the Sene constituency of the Brong Ahafo Region of Ghana. He won on the ticket of the National Democratic Congress. His constituency was a part of the 7 parliamentary seats out of 21 seats won by the New Patriotic Party in that election for the Brong Ahafo Region. The National Democratic Congress won a minority total of 92 parliamentary seats out of 200 seats in the 3rd parliament of the 4th republic of Ghana. He was elected with 14,567 votes out of 21,465 total valid votes cast. This was equivalent to 68.1% of the total valid votes cast. He was elected over Isaac Sunkwa-Hyeaman of the New Patriotic Party, Geofery Agbo of the National Reform Party, Abukasim Tahiru of the Convention People's Party. These won 5,152, 1,248 and 428 votes respectively out of the total valid votes cast. These were equivalent to 24.1%, 5.8% and 2.0% respectively of total valid votes cast.

=== 2004 Elections ===
Twmasi-Appiah was elected for the second time as the Member of parliament for the Sene constituency, later renamed to Sene West constituency, in the Brong Ahafo region of Ghana in the 2004 Ghanaian general elections. He thus represented the constituency in the 4th parliament of the 4th republic of Ghana. He was elected with 20,775 votes out of 29,894 total valid votes cast. This was equivalent to 69.50% of total valid votes cast. He was elected over Sunkwa-Hyeaman Isaac of the New Patriotic Party and Yushahu Hallaru Alhaji Yussif of the Convention People's Party. These obtained 8,640 and 479 votes respectively of total valid votes cast. These were equivalent to 28.90% and 1.60% respectively of total valid votes cast. Twumasi-Appiah was elected on the ticket of the National Democratic Congress. The National Democratic Congress won 10 parliamentary seats out of 24 parliamentary seats for the Brong Ahafo region in that election. 3,4 In all, the National Democratic Congress won a minority total of 94 parliamentary seat representation out of 230 parliamentary seats in the 4th parliament of the 4th republic.

=== 2008 Elections ===
Twumasi-Appiah was re-elected for the third time as the Member of parliament for the Sene constituency in the 2008 Ghanaian general elections. He again represented the constituency in the 5th parliament of the 4th republic of Ghana. He was elected with 12,232 votes out of 25,924 valid votes cast. This was equivalent to 54.64% of total valid votes cast. He was elected over Mohammed Belinyi Abdulai of the New Patriotic Party, Emmanuel Osei Ramson of the Convention People's Party, Opoku Senkyire Gabriel of the Democratic People's Party and Sumani Bapio Issahaku of the People's National Convention. These obtained 9,440, 470, 315 and 305 votes respectively of total valid votes cast. These were equivalent to 41.47%, 2.06%, 1.38% and 1.34% respectively of total valid votes cast. Twumasi-Appiah was elected again on the ticket of the National Democratic Congress. The National Democratic Congress won 8 out of 24parliamentary seats for the Brong Ahafo region in that election. 3,7 In all, though, the National Democratic Congress won a majority total of 114 parliamentary seat representation out of 230 parliamentary seats in the 5th parliament of the 4th republic of Ghana.

== Personal life ==
Twumasi-Appiah is married with two children. He is a Christian and fellowships with Resurrection Power and Living Bread Christian Center.
