= Renato Verissimo =

Brazilian mixed martial arts fighter

- Born: Renato Verissimo de Oliveira; August 3, 1973 (age 53); Rio de Janeiro, Brazil
- Other names: Charuto
- Height: 6 ft 1 in (1.85 m)
- Weight: 170 lb (77 kg; 12 st)
- Division: Welterweight
- Stance: Orthodox
- Fighting out of: Hilo, Hawaii, United States
- Team: BJ Penn's MMA
- Rank: 5th degree black belt in Brazilian Jiu-Jitsu under André Pederneiras
- Years active: 2002–2007

Mixed martial arts record
- Total: 13
- Wins: 7
- By knockout: 6
- By decision: 1
- Losses: 5
- By knockout: 4
- By decision: 1
- No contests: 1

Other information
- Mixed martial arts record from Sherdog

Renato Verissimo de Oliveira (born August 3, 1973) is a Brazilian 5th degree Black belt in Brazilian Jiu-Jitsu under André Pederneiras and also a retired mixed martial artist, who has fought in the Ultimate Fighting Championship and Elite Xtreme Combat. He is known throughout the MMA community by the nickname of "Charuto", meaning "cigar" in Portuguese.

== Life ==
He grew up in Brazil, where he trained in Brazilian Jiu Jitsu and earned his black belt. After moving to Hawaii, he became involved in mixed martial arts through B.J. Penn, who he instructed.

After fighting in Rumble on the Rock, his UFC debut was a decision victory over Carlos Newton at UFC 46, which earned him the chance to face former UFC Welterweight Champion Matt Hughes at UFC 48, where Charuto lost by unanimous decision.

Charuto then returned to Hawaiian events, fighting for Rumble On The Rock and ICON Sport.

Charuto was featured in the August 8, 2007 episode of the Versus reality television series TapouT. In his last ever MMA fight, he lost to Jake Shields via TKO due to elbows in the first round on the September 15th card EliteXC: Uprising.

Charuto was also featured in Marshal D. Carper's 2010 book titled "The Cauliflower Chronicles", detailing Marshal's experience training at the BJ Penn Academy in Hilo, largely training under Charuto.

Charuto now resides in Wilmington, NC and teaches at Evolution Mixed Martial Arts in Wrightsville Beach.

== Career accomplishments ==
- Ultimate Fighting Championship
  - UFC Encyclopedia Awards
    - Fight of the Night (One time) vs. Frank Trigg

== Mixed martial arts record ==
Professional record breakdown
13 matches	7 wins	5 losses
By knockout	6	4
By submission	0	0
By decision	1	1
No contests	1	

Res.	Record	Opponent	Method	Event	Date	Round	Time	Location	Notes
Loss	7–5 (1)	Jake Shields	TKO (elbows and punches)	EliteXC: Uprising	September 15, 2007	1	4:00	Honolulu, Hawaii, United States	
Win	7–4 (1)	Lars Haven	TKO (punches)	Icon Sport: Epic	March 31, 2007	1	2:09	Honolulu, Hawaii, United States	
Win	6–4 (1)	Kris Fleurstil	TKO (punches)	Icon Sport: All in	February 9, 2007	1	2:19	Honolulu, Hawaii, United States	
Loss	5–4 (1)	Kuniyoshi Hironaka	TKO (punches)	Rumble on the Rock 9	April 21, 2006	2	3:03	Honolulu, Hawaii, United States	
Loss	5–3 (1)	Carlos Condit	KO (knee and punches)	Rumble on the Rock 8	January 20, 2006	1	0:17	Honolulu, Hawaii, United States	
Win	5–2 (1)	Yuichi Nakanishi	TKO (Doctor Stoppage)	Rumble on the Rock 7	May 7, 2005	2	2:32	Honolulu, Hawaii, United States	
Loss	4–2 (1)	Frank Trigg	TKO (elbows)	UFC 50	October 22, 2004	2	2:11	Atlantic City, New Jersey, United States	
Loss	4–1 (1)	Matt Hughes	Decision (unanimous)	UFC 48	June 19, 2004	3	5:00	Las Vegas, Nevada, United States	
Win	4–0 (1)	Carlos Newton	Decision (unanimous)	UFC 46	January 31, 2004	3	5:00	Las Vegas, Nevada, United States	
Win	3–0 (1)	Gil Castillo	TKO (corner stoppage)	Rumble on the Rock 4	October 10, 2003	2	5:00	Honolulu, Hawaii, United States	
Win	2–0 (1)	Ray Elbe	TKO (punches)	Rumble on the Rock 3	August 9, 2003	1	1:41	Hilo, Hawaii, United States	
NC	1–0 (1)	Shannon Ritch	No Contest (illegal headbutt)	Rumble on the Rock 2	March 15, 2003	1	3:09	Hilo, Hawaii, United States	Ritch cut Verissimo above the left eye with an inadvertent headbutt
Win	1–0	Roland Fabre	TKO (punches)	Warriors Quest 4: Genesis	March 29, 2002	1	3:50	Honolulu, Hawaii, United States	

== See also ==
- List of male mixed martial artists
