= Sene West (district) =

District in Bono East Region, Ghana

Sene West District
- District
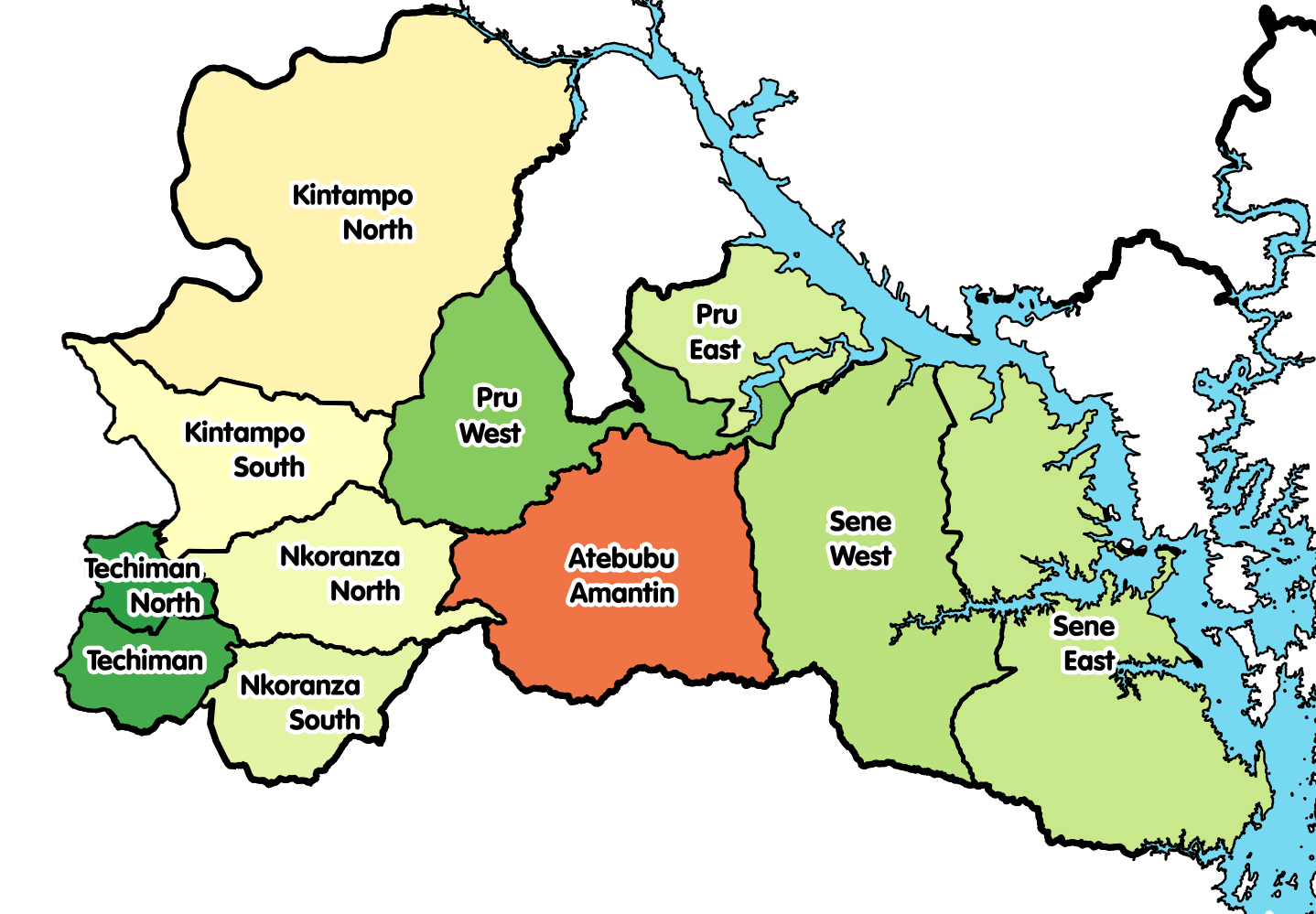
- Districts of Bono East Region

- Location of Sene West District within Bono East Region
- Coordinates: 7°44′3.12″N 0°40′54.48″W
- Country: Ghana
- Region: Bono East
- Capital: Kwame Danso

Population (2021)
  - Total: 69,836
- Time zone: UTC+0 (GMT)

Sene West District is one of the eleven districts in Bono East Region, Ghana. Originally it was formerly part of the then-larger Sene District on 10 March 1989, until the eastern part of the district was split off to create Sene East District on 28 June 2012; thus the remaining part has been renamed as Sene West District. The district assembly is located in the eastern part of Bono East Region and has Kwame Danso as its capital town.
