= Rumble on the Rock =

Defunct MMA promoter based in United States

- Industry: Sports promotion
- Founded: 2003
- Founder: Sadaharu Tanikawa (President of FEG)
- Defunct: 2009
- Headquarters: Hawaii, United States
- Parent: Fighting and Entertainment Group; Rumble World Entertainment

Rumble on the Rock (also known as K-1 Rumble on the Rock) was an American mixed martial arts (MMA) promotion company in promotion with K-1 and operated by Fighting and Entertainment Group and Rumble World Entertainment. Headquartered in Hawaii, Rumble on the Rock was formed in 2003 and enforces the Unified Rules of Mixed Martial Arts with events structured around tournaments.

Rumble on the Rock has held more than 30 events and featured nearly 300 matches. Its events have included appearances by a number of internationally recognized mixed martial artists, including Anderson Silva, B.J. Penn, Takanori Gomi, Jake Shields, Gilbert Melendez, Carlos Condit, Homer Moore, Chael Sonnen, Rodrigo Gracie, Ricco Rodriguez, Yushin Okami, Frank Trigg, Royler Gracie, Dave Menne, Matt Lindland, Thales Leites, and more.

== Rules ==
Rumble on the Rock's rules are based upon the Unified Rules of Mixed Martial Arts that were originally established by the New Jersey State Athletic Control Board and modified by the Nevada State Athletic Commission. These rules have been adopted across the US in other states that regulate mixed martial arts. As a result, they have become the standard de facto set of rules for professional mixed martial arts across the US and for cage-based MMA worldwide.

All bouts are contested over three, five-minute rounds, with the exception of five-round championship bouts. There is a one-minute rest period in-between rounds. As per the Unified Rules of MMA, Rumble on the Rock only allows competitors to fight in approved shorts, without shoes or any other sort of foot padding. Fighters must use approved light gloves (4-6 ounces) that allow fingers to grab. The referee has the right to stop the fighters and stand them up if they reach a stalemate on the ground (where neither are in a dominant position nor working toward one) after a verbal warning.

=== Match outcome ===
Matches usually end via:

- Submission: a fighter taps on the mat or his opponent three times (or more) or verbally submits.
- Knockout: a fighter falls from a legal blow and is either unconscious or unable to immediately continue.
- Technical Knockout: stoppage of the fight by the referee if it is determined a fighter cannot "intelligently defend" himself or by ringside doctor due to injury.
- Judges' Decision: Depending on scoring, a match may end as:
  - unanimous decision (all three judges score a win for one fighter),
  - split decision (two judges score a win for one fighter with the third for the other),
  - majority decision (two judges score a win for one fighter with one for a draw),
  - unanimous draw (all three judges score a draw),
  - majority draw (two judges score a draw).
  - split draw (the total points for each fighter is equal)

A fight can also end in a technical decision, technical draw, disqualification, forfeit or no contest.

=== Judging criteria ===
The ten-point must system is used for all Rumble on the Rock bouts; three judges score each round and the winner of each receives ten points, the loser nine points or less. If the round is even, both fighters receive ten points. The decision is announced at the end of the match but the judge's scorecards are not announced.

=== Fouls ===
The following are considered fouls in Rumble on the Rock:

1. Butting with the head.
2. Eye gouging of any kind.
3. Biting.
4. Hair pulling.
5. Groin attacks of any kind.
6. Fish hooking, gouging as in self-defense and some martial arts.
7. Putting a finger into any orifice or into any cut or laceration on an opponent.
8. Small joint manipulation.
9. Striking to the spine or the back of the head. (see Rabbit punch)
10. Striking downward using the point of the elbow. (see Elbow (strike))
11. Throat strikes of any kind, including, without limitation, grabbing the trachea.
12. Clawing, pinching or twisting the flesh.
13. Grabbing the clavicle.
14. Kicking the head of a grounded opponent.
15. Kneeing the head of a grounded opponent.
16. Stomping a grounded opponent.
17. Kicking to the kidney with the heel.
18. Spiking an opponent to the canvas on his head or neck. (see piledriver (professional wrestling))
19. Throwing an opponent out of the ring or fenced area.
20. Holding the shorts or gloves of an opponent.
21. Spitting at an opponent.
22. Engaging in an unsportsmanlike conduct that causes an injury to an opponent.
23. Holding the ropes or the fence.
24. Using abusive language in the ring or fenced area.
25. Attacking an opponent on or during the break.
26. Attacking an opponent who is under the care of the referee.
27. Attacking an opponent after the bell has sounded the end of the period of unarmed combat.
28. Flagrantly disregarding the instructions of the referee.
29. Timidity, including, without limitation, avoiding contact with an opponent, intentionally or consistently dropping the mouthpiece or faking an injury.
30. Interference by the corner.
31. Throwing in the towel during competition.

When a foul is charged, the referee in their discretion may deduct one or more points as a penalty. If a foul incapacitates a fighter, then the match may end in a disqualification if the foul was intentional, or a no contest if unintentional. If a foul causes a fighter to be unable to continue later in the bout, it ends with a technical decision win to the injured fighter if the injured fighter is ahead on points, otherwise it is a technical draw.

== Rumble on the Rock champions ==
Class	Upper weight limit	Champion	Event	Date
Welterweight	170 lb (77 kg; 12 st)	(United States) Jake Shields def. Carlos Condit	Rumble on the Rock 9 Blaisdell Arena, Honolulu, Hawaii, United States	April 21, 2006
Lightweight	155 lb (70 kg; 11.1 st)	(United States) B.J. Penn def. Takanori Gomi	Rumble on the Rock 4 Blaisdell Arena, Honolulu, Hawaii, United States	October 10, 2003

== Tournament champions ==
Event	Date	Division	Winner	Runner-up
Rumble on the Rock 9	April 21, 2006	Welterweight	(United States) Jake Shields	(United States) Carlos Condit

=== Rumble on the Rock Welterweight Tournament bracket ===
Quarter-finals
(United States) Jake Shields	DEC
(United States) Dave Menne	15:00
(Japan) Yushin Okami	DQ
(Brazil) Anderson Silva	2:33
(United States) Ronald Jhun	15:00
(United States) Frank Trigg	DEC
(Brazil) Renato Verissimo	0:17
(United States) Carlos Condit	TKO

Semi-finals
(United States) Jake Shields	DEC
(Japan) Yushin Okami	15:00
(United States) Frank Trigg	1:22
(United States) Carlos Condit	SUB

Final
(United States) Jake Shields	DEC
(United States) Carlos Condit	15:00

== Events ==
#	Event Title	Date	Location
33	Rumble World Entertainment - Just Scrap 19	January 19, 2013	Hilo, Hawaii, United States
32	Rumble World Entertainment - Just Scrap: Maui 2	September 8, 2012	Hilo, Hawaii, United States
31	Rumble World Entertainment - Just Scrap 15	January 14, 2012	Hilo, Hawaii, United States
30	Rumble World Entertainment - Just Scrap 14	October 15, 2011	Hilo, Hawaii, United States
29	Rumble on the Rock - BJ Penn Presents: Just Scrap	August 7, 2010	Hilo, Hawaii, United States
28	Rumble on the Rock - Beatdown 10	June 13, 2009	Hilo, Hawaii, United States
27	Rumble on the Rock - Beatdown Tournament	December 21, 2008	Hilo, Hawaii, United States
26	Rumble on the Rock - Beatdown 9	October 18, 2008	Hawaii, United States
25	Rumble on the Rock - Beatdown 8	August 9, 2008	Hawaii, United States
24	Rumble on the Rock - Beatdown 7	June 28, 2008	Hawaii, United States
23	Rumble on the Rock - Beatdown 6	February 16, 2008	Hawaii, United States
22	Rumble on the Rock - Beatdown 5	September 28, 2007	Hilo, Hawaii, United States
21	Rumble on the Rock - Just Scrap	September 1, 2007	Hilo, Hawaii, United States
20	Rumble on the Rock - Beatdown 4	July 14, 2007	Hawaii, United States
19	Rumble on the Rock - Beatdown 3	May 5, 2007	Hilo, Hawaii, United States
18	Rumble on the Rock - Beatdown 2	October 21, 2006	Hilo, Hawaii, United States
17	Rumble on the Rock - Beatdown 1	June 17, 2006	Hawaii, United States
16	Rumble on the Rock 9	April 21, 2006	Honolulu, Hawaii, United States
15	Rumble on the Rock 8	January 20, 2006	Honolulu, Hawaii, United States
14	Rumble on the Rock - Just Scrap	November 5, 2005	Hilo, Hawaii, United States
13	Rumble on the Rock - Showdown in Maui	October 7, 2005	Maui, Hawaii, United States
12	Rumble on the Rock - Qualifiers	September 17, 2005	Honolulu, Hawaii, United States
11	Rumble on the Rock - Proving Grounds 4	July 9, 2005	Hilo, Hawaii, United States
10	Rumble on the Rock 7	May 7, 2005	Honolulu, Hawaii, United States
9	Rumble on the Rock - Proving Grounds 3	March 11, 2005	Honolulu, Hawaii, United States
8	Rumble on the Rock 6	November 20, 2004	Honolulu, Hawaii, United States
7	Rumble on the Rock - Proving Grounds 2	September 18, 2004	Kona District, Hawaii, United States
6	Rumble on the Rock 5	May 7, 2004	Honolulu, Hawaii, United States
5	Rumble on the Rock - Proving Grounds 1	December 27, 2003	Hilo, Hawaii, United States
4	Rumble on the Rock 4	October 10, 2003	Honolulu, Hawaii, United States
3	Rumble on the Rock 3	August 9, 2003	Hilo, Hawaii, United States
2	Rumble on the Rock 2	March 15, 2003	Hilo, Hawaii, United States
1	Rumble on the Rock 1	December 28, 2002	Hilo, Hawaii, United States
