= Jeremy Jackson (fighter) =

American mixed martial arts fighter

- Born: September 19, 1982 (age 44); Brawley, California, U.S.
- Other names: Scorpion
- Height: 5 ft 10 in (178 cm)
- Weight: 170 lb (77 kg; 12 st)
- Division: Welterweight
- Reach: 71 in (180 cm)
- Stance: Orthodox
- Fighting out of: Port Hueneme, California
- Team: Team Freedom
- Years active: 2001–2008

Mixed martial arts record
- Total: 14
- Wins: 9
- By knockout: 6
- By submission: 2
- By decision: 1
- Losses: 5
- By knockout: 3
- By submission: 2

Other information
- Mixed martial arts record from Sherdog

Jeremy Rea Jackson (born September 19, 1982) is an American former mixed martial artist from California.

== Career ==
Jackson's first professional MMA fight was on September 9, 2001, against Jake Shields in the Gladiator Challenge 6: Caged Beasts. Jackson has fought in The Ultimate Fighting Championship, Kage Kombat, IFC, King of the Cage, Ultimate Athlete, World Extreme Cagefighting, Gladiator Challenge, Ring Of Honor, and Total Combat. Jeremy Jackson had a trilogy with Nick Diaz. He won via knockout in their first fight, the trilogy ended with him losing two straight to Diaz, the latter loss coming at UFC 44: Undisputed. He competed as a welterweight on The Ultimate Fighter 4 on Spike TV, but was sent home before having a chance to fight after violating the rules of the show.

Although ejected from the tournament, Jackson fought Pete Spratt in the fourth season finale of The Ultimate Fighter. Jackson submitted due to a neck injury in the second round and was released from the UFC.

On June 30, 2008, Jackson was arrested and taken into custody by the Ventura County Sheriff's Office. He was charged with multiple counts of aggravated rape and held on $1 million bail.

Jackson was sentenced to 25 years to life after pleading guilty to the rape charges against his lawyer's advice.

== Mixed martial arts record ==
Professional record breakdown
14 matches	9 wins	5 losses
By knockout	6	3
By submission	2	2
By decision	1	0

Res.	Record	Opponent	Method	Event	Date	Round	Time	Location	Notes
Win	9–5	Hector Carrilo	TKO (punches)	Total Combat 19	March 31, 2007	1	N/A		
Loss	8–5	Pete Spratt	TKO (neck injury)	The Ultimate Fighter: The Comeback Finale	November 11, 2006	2	1:11		
Win	8–4	Christian Vargas	Submission (rear-naked choke)	TC 10: Total Combat 10	October 15, 2006	1	3:56		
Win	7–4	Mark Moreno	Submission (rear-naked choke)	ROH 1: Ring of Honor 1	November 22, 2003	1	1:30		
Loss	6–4	Nick Diaz	Submission (armbar)	UFC 44	September 26, 2003	3	2:04		
Loss	6–3	Nick Diaz	TKO (punches)	IFC WC 18: Big Valley Brawl	July 19, 2003	1	4:17		
Win	6–2	Shonie Carter	Decision (unanimous)	WEC 6	March 27, 2003	3	5:00		
Win	5–2	Nick Diaz	TKO (punches)	UA 4: King of the Mountain	September 28, 2002	1	0:49		
Win	4–2	Mike Penalber	TKO (punches)	UA 4: King of the Mountain	September 28, 2002	1	N/A		
Win	3–2	Zach Light	TKO (punches)	UA 4: King of the Mountain	September 28, 2002	2	N/A		
Win	2–2	Eddy Ellis	TKO (punches)	IFC WC 17: Warriors Challenge 17	July 12, 2002	1	2:24		
Loss	1–2	Joe Stevenson	TKO (submission to punches)	KOTC 15: Bad Intentions	June 22, 2002	1	1:27		
Win	1–1	Peter Delayo	TKO (strikes)	KK: Kage Kombat	April 6, 2002	N/A	N/A		
Loss	0–1	Jake Shields	Submission (rear-naked choke)	GC 6: Caged Beasts	September 9, 2001	1	2:03		
