= Carlos Condit =

American mixed martial arts fighter

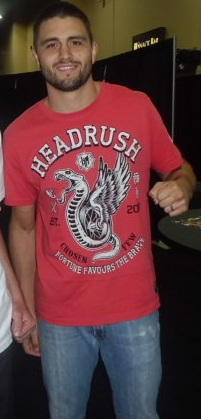
- Carlos Condit in 2012
- Born: April 26, 1984 (age 42); Albuquerque, New Mexico, U.S.
- Nickname: The Natural Born Killer
- Height: 6 ft 2 in (1.88 m)
- Weight: 170 lb (77 kg; 12 st 2 lb)
- Division: Welterweight
- Reach: 75 1/2 in (192 cm)
- Style: Kickboxing
- Stance: Orthodox
- Fighting out of: Albuquerque, New Mexico, U.S.
- Team: Fit NHB (1999–2008); Arizona Combat Sports (2008–2009); Jackson Wink MMA Academy (2009–2021)
- Trainer: Greg Jackson; Mike Winkeljohn
- Rank: Black belt in 10th Planet Jiu-Jitsu
- Years active: 2002–2021

Professional boxing record
- Total: 1
- Losses: 1

Kickboxing record
- Total: 4
- Wins: 3
- By knockout: 2
- Losses: 1
- By knockout: 1

Mixed martial arts record
- Total: 46
- Wins: 32
- By knockout: 15
- By submission: 13
- By decision: 4
- Losses: 14
- By knockout: 1
- By submission: 6
- By decision: 7

Other information
- Boxing record from BoxRec
- Mixed martial arts record from Sherdog

Carlos Joseph Condit (born April 26, 1984) is an American former professional mixed martial artist. He previously competed in the Welterweight division in the Ultimate Fighting Championship (UFC), where he is a former Interim UFC Welterweight Champion. Condit formerly fought in the UFC's sister promotion, World Extreme Cagefighting (WEC), where he was the final Welterweight Champion. Condit has also competed for both Shootboxing and Pancrase in Japan.

Condit has launched business ventures, including a coffeeshop and a line of custom jeans with Los Angeles brand SENE.

== Background ==
Condit was born on April 26, 1984, in Albuquerque, New Mexico. Condit's father, Brian, was the Chief of Staff for former New Mexico governor and Democratic presidential candidate Bill Richardson. Condit attended Cibola High School on Albuquerque's West Side. He began wrestling at the age of nine and continued throughout high school, and started training in Gaidojutsu under Greg Jackson at fifteen.

== Mixed martial arts career ==
=== Early career (2002–2006) ===
Condit turned professional at eighteen years old, taking less than a minute to submit Nick Roscorta with a rear-naked choke in his debut in Juárez, Mexico, on September 6, 2002. He also won his next four fights in the first round, with only one going past the one-minute mark, before tasting defeat for the first time, albeit under the shoot boxing ruleset, in his international debut. He faced off with ninety-five fight veteran and Shoot Boxing World Tournament 2002 champion Andy Souwer in Tokyo, Japan on September 23, 2003, losing by technical knockout due to leg kicks with seventeen seconds left of the fight after being knocked down three times in the fifth and final round.

Returning to MMA, Condit continued his impressive run of form in the sport with a further three first round stoppage wins to go 8–0 before he was submitted with a Carlo Prater triangle choke inside the opening round in Albuquerque on September 11, 2004. He rebounded from the loss with a four fight win streak and returned to Japan to fight in Pancrase, losing to Satoru Kitaoka via first round heel hook submission at Pancrase: Spiral 8 in Yokohama on October 2, 2005. Following this, he had a stint in the Hawaii-based Rumble on the Rock promotion and defeated Ross Ebañez via TKO in his promotional debut before going on to compete in the ROTR Welterweight Tournament. The tournament's quarter-finals were held on January 20, 2006, at Rumble on the Rock 8 where Condit recorded a seventeen-second TKO stoppage of Renato Verissimo. The semis and the final both took place on the same night, April 21, 2006, at Rumble on the Rock 9 and Condit submitted Frank Trigg with a triangle armbar to book his place in the final against Jake Shields. Going the distance for the first time in his career, Condit lost by unanimous decision.

Condit suffered a second consecutive loss in his next outing, submitting to a Pat Healy rear-naked choke in round three of their contest in Oakland, California, before making a return to Pancrase and defeating Koji Oishi via TKO in his sophomore appearance in the promotion. He ended his tenure in Japan with a Kimura submission of Takuya Wada and a particularly violent stomp KO over Tatsunori Tanaka before returning stateside and joining the WEC.

=== World Extreme Cagefighting (2007–2008) ===
Condit made his debut for the WEC on January 20, 2007, at WEC 25 where he defeated Kyle Jensen in the first round via submission (Rear Naked Choke).

Condit's second fight would be for the vacant WEC Welterweight Championship against John Alessio at WEC 26: Condit vs. Alessio. Condit would win this fight in the second round, once again, by Rear Naked Choke and became the WEC Welterweight Champion.

Condit faced Brock Larson on August 5, 2007, at WEC 29. Condit won the fight via first round submission (armbar).

Condit would next face Carlo Prater in a rematch on February 13, 2008, at WEC 32. Condit defeated Prater via submission in the first round.

Condit faced Hiromitsu Miura on August 3, 2008, at WEC 35. Condit won the back and forth fight via TKO in the fourth round, winning Fight of the Night honors.

A rematch with Brock Larson was briefly linked to WEC 39. The pairing was scrapped as both fighters suffered injuries and were eventually rebooked with different opponents as they transferred to the UFC. Condit would be the last WEC Welterweight Champion before the UFC dissolved the title and division. Condit's record in the WEC ended at a perfect 5–0.

=== Ultimate Fighting Championship (2009–2021) ===
Condit would make the move to UFC after the WEC buyout and he made his debut in the Ultimate Fighting Championship (UFC) organization. He made his promotional debut on April 1, 2009, at UFC Fight Night 18 facing Martin Kampmann. Condit lost the back and forth fight via split decision. The fight was close enough that FightMetric ruled the bout a draw.

He was then scheduled to fight Chris Lytle on September 16, 2009, at UFC Fight Night 19, but Lytle had to drop out due to a knee injury. UFC newcomer Jake Ellenberger would step up to replace Lytle. Condit then defeated Ellenberger via split decision to get his first win in the UFC.

Condit later had to drop out of a scheduled fight at UFC 108 against Paul Daley due to a hand injury.

Condit defeated Rory MacDonald via third-round TKO at UFC 115 in a bout that earned the Fight of the Night award. Although MacDonald seemed to get the better of the first two rounds with effective striking and takedowns, Condit came back with a more aggressive attitude in the final round, finishing MacDonald with a combination of elbows and short punches.

Condit faced Dan Hardy on October 16, 2010, at UFC 120. In the first round, Condit connected with a powerful left hook during an exchange, which dropped Hardy. Condit then landed two punches to Hardy on the ground before the referee stopped the fight at 4:27 of the first round. This victory made Condit the first and to date only man to defeat Hardy by way of KO and also earned him Knockout of the Night honours.

Condit was expected to face Chris Lytle on February 27, 2011, at UFC 127. However, Condit was forced from the bout after suffering a knee injury while training and he was replaced by promotional newcomer Brian Ebersole.

Condit faced Dong Hyun Kim on July 2, 2011, at UFC 132. Condit won the fight via first round knockout (flying knee and punches) earning Knockout of the Night honors. This fight gave Kim his first professional MMA loss.

Condit was expected to face B.J. Penn on October 29, 2011, at UFC 137. However, UFC president Dana White announced at the UFC 137 press conference that Condit would no longer face Penn and instead replace Nick Diaz, who had failed to show up for any event related press appearances, and face Georges St-Pierre for the UFC Welterweight Championship at UFC 137. On October 18, 2011, it was announced that St. Pierre had pulled out of the fight due to a knee injury. After conferring with his management and UFC officials, Condit elected not to compete against a replacement fighter at UFC 137, but face St. Pierre in early 2012. However, after Diaz defeated Penn at UFC 137, officials decided to have St. Pierre fight Diaz at UFC 143.

==== UFC interim Welterweight Championship ====
Condit was expected to face Josh Koscheck on February 4, 2012, at UFC 143. However, due to a knee injury sustained by St. Pierre, Condit faced Diaz at the event, with the winner being awarded an interim UFC Welterweight Championship. Condit defeated Diaz via unanimous decision (48–47, 49–46, and 49–46) to win the UFC Interim Welterweight Championship.

Condit faced Georges St-Pierre on November 17, 2012, at UFC 154. Condit became only the second man to knock down St. Pierre in the UFC when he dropped him with a head kick early in the third round and swarmed him, but was unable to finish. He ultimately lost the fight via unanimous decision in a back and forth battle which earned both participants Fight of the Night honors for their performance. After the bout, St-Pierre stated Condit was the best fighter he had ever fought.

Condit was expected to face Rory MacDonald in a rematch on March 16, 2013, at UFC 158. However, MacDonald pulled out of the bout citing an injury, and was replaced by Johny Hendricks. While Condit was able to outstrike Hendricks significantly for the majority of the fight, Hendricks was able to score multiple takedowns in each round, earning Hendricks a unanimous decision victory. Their performance earned both participants Fight of the Night honors.

Condit faced Martin Kampmann in a rematch on August 28, 2013, at UFC Fight Night 27. After a first round which saw Kampmann control the action with his wrestling, Condit was able to utilize his more varied arsenal of strikes for the remainder of the bout to get the TKO in the fourth round via a series of punches and knees, avenging his previous loss. The fight also earned Condit his third consecutive (and fourth overall) Fight of the Night bonus award.

Condit was expected to face Matt Brown on December 14, 2013, at UFC on Fox 9. However, in the week leading up to the event, Brown pulled out of the bout citing a back injury. As a result, Condit was removed from the card as well.

Condit next fought Tyron Woodley in the co-main event at UFC 171. In round two, Woodley landed on Condit's right knee on a takedown. The referee stood the fight up for inactivity, and when Condit tried to step away after Woodley kicked his left knee, his right buckled, causing him to collapse in agony and the referee to award Woodley a TKO. An MRI confirmed that Condit had suffered a torn ACL and partially torn meniscus which would require surgery.

After over a year away from the sport due to his knee injury, Condit returned to face Thiago Alves on May 30, 2015, in the main event at UFC Fight Night 67. Condit was successful in his return, winning the fight via TKO after the cage-side doctor ended the contest between the second and third round due to the amount of damage Alves had taken.

Condit was expected to face current champion Robbie Lawler on November 15, 2015, at UFC 193. However, the bout was scrapped from the event after Lawler suffered a thumb injury. The fight eventually took place as the headliner at UFC 195 on January 2, 2016. Condit lost the bout by split decision. Condit landed 198 of the 504 strikes he threw to Lawler's respective 78 of 177. Each fighter was credited with one knockdown during the fight, as Condit dropped Lawler in the first round and Lawler floored Condit in the second. 15 of 20 media outlets scored the bout in favor of Condit, 2 of 20 scored a draw and only 3 of 20 scored in favor of Lawler. Despite the controversial loss, both participants were awarded a Fight of the Night bonus award.

=== Consecutive losses ===
Condit returned to the cage eight months later to face Demian Maia in the main event of UFC on Fox 21 on August 27, 2016. He lost the fight via submission in the first round.

After a sixteen-month layoff, Condit returned to the UFC and faced Neil Magny on December 30, 2017, at UFC 219. He lost the fight by unanimous decision.

Condit was expected to face Matt Brown on April 14, 2018, at UFC on Fox 29. Brown was pulled out from the fight due to a torn Anterior cruciate ligament (ACL), and was replaced by Alex Oliveira. Condit lost to Oliveira via a guillotine choke.

Condit faced Michael Chiesa on December 29, 2018, at UFC 232. He lost the fight via submission in the second round.

Condit was scheduled to face Mickey Gall on December 7, 2019, at UFC on ESPN 7. However, Condit was forced to pull from the event due to a detached retina, thus the bout was subsequently cancelled.

=== Return to victory ===
After nearly a year away from the sport, Condit faced Court McGee on October 4, 2020 at UFC on ESPN: Holm vs. Aldana. After knocking McGee down in the first round, Condit won the fight via unanimous decision.

Condit faced Matt Brown on January 16, 2021, at UFC on ABC 1. He won the fight via unanimous decision.

Condit faced Max Griffin on July 10, 2021, at UFC 264. He lost the fight via unanimous decision.

On September 17, 2021, it was announced that Condit had retired from competing in mixed martial arts.

== Professional grappling career ==
Condit competed against Jake Ellenberger at Submission Underground 23 on May 23, 2021. He submitted Ellenberger with a heel hook.

Condit faced Ashley Williams in the main event of Polaris 22 on November 5, 2022. He lost the match by submission.

Condit faced Michael Page in the main event of Polaris 30 on November 2, 2024. He lost the match by decision.

== Personal life ==
Condit married his longtime girlfriend, Seager Marie McCullah, in December 2010. The couple welcomed their first child, a son, in March 2010. The couple divorced in 2018.

== Business ventures ==
Condit partnered with Los Angeles brand Sene to launch a custom denim collaboration in November 2020.

== Championships and accomplishments ==
=== Mixed martial arts ===
- World Extreme Cagefighting
  - WEC Welterweight Championship (one time, last)
    - Three successful title defenses vs. John Alessio, Brock Larson, and Carlo Prater
  - Undefeated in the WEC (5–0)
  - Fight of the Night (one time) vs. Hiromitsu Miura
- Ultimate Fighting Championship
  - Interim UFC Welterweight Championship (one time)
  - Fight of the Night (five times) vs. Rory MacDonald, Georges St-Pierre, Johny Hendricks, Martin Kampmann, and Robbie Lawler
  - Knockout of the Night (two times) vs. Dan Hardy and Dong Hyun Kim
  - UFC.com Awards
    - 2009: Ranked #5 Fight of the Year vs. Jake Ellenberger & Ranked #10 Fight of the Year vs. Martin Kampmann
    - 2010: Ranked #9 Knockout of the Year vs. Dan Hardy & Ranked #6 Fight of the Year vs. Rory MacDonald
    - 2012: Ranked #5 Fight of the Year vs. Georges St-Pierre
    - 2013: Half-Year Awards: Best Fight of the 1HY & Ranked #5 Fight of the Year vs. Johny Hendricks
    - 2016: Half-Year Awards: Best Fight of the 1HY & Ranked #3 Fight of the Year vs. Robbie Lawler
- Rumble on the Rock
  - Rumble on the Rock Welterweight Tournament runner-up
- Wrestling Observer Newsletter
  - 2016 MMA Match of the Year (2016) vs. Robbie Lawler
- CBS Sports
  - 2016 #4 Ranked UFC Fight of the Year vs. Robbie Lawler
- MMA Junkie
  - 2016 Fight of the Year vs. Robbie Lawler at UFC 195
  - 2016 January Fight of the Month vs. Robbie Lawler

== Mixed martial arts record ==
Professional record breakdown
46 matches	32 wins	14 losses
By knockout	15	1
By submission	13	6
By decision	4	7

Res.	Record	Opponent	Method	Event	Date	Round	Time	Location	Notes
Loss	32–14	Max Griffin	Decision (unanimous)	UFC 264	July 10, 2021	3	5:00	Las Vegas, Nevada, United States	
Win	32–13	Matt Brown	Decision (unanimous)	UFC on ABC: Holloway vs. Kattar	January 16, 2021	3	5:00	Abu Dhabi, United Arab Emirates	
Win	31–13	Court McGee	Decision (unanimous)	UFC on ESPN: Holm vs. Aldana	October 4, 2020	3	5:00	Abu Dhabi, United Arab Emirates	
Loss	30–13	Michael Chiesa	Submission (kimura)	UFC 232	December 29, 2018	2	0:56	Inglewood, California, United States	
Loss	30–12	Alex Oliveira	Submission (guillotine choke)	UFC on Fox: Poirier vs. Gaethje	April 14, 2018	2	3:17	Glendale, Arizona, United States	
Loss	30–11	Neil Magny	Decision (unanimous)	UFC 219	December 30, 2017	3	5:00	Las Vegas, Nevada, United States	
Loss	30–10	Demian Maia	Submission (rear-naked choke)	UFC on Fox: Maia vs. Condit	August 27, 2016	1	1:52	Vancouver, British Columbia, Canada	
Loss	30–9	Robbie Lawler	Decision (split)	UFC 195	January 2, 2016	5	5:00	Las Vegas, Nevada, United States	For the UFC Welterweight Championship. Fight of the Night.
Win	30–8	Thiago Alves	TKO (doctor stoppage)	UFC Fight Night: Condit vs. Alves	May 30, 2015	2	5:00	Goiânia, Brazil	
Loss	29–8	Tyron Woodley	TKO (leg injury)	UFC 171	March 15, 2014	2	2:00	Dallas, Texas, United States	
Win	29–7	Martin Kampmann	TKO (punches and knees)	UFC Fight Night: Condit vs. Kampmann 2	August 28, 2013	4	0:54	Indianapolis, Indiana, United States	Fight of the Night.
Loss	28–7	Johny Hendricks	Decision (unanimous)	UFC 158	March 16, 2013	3	5:00	Montreal, Quebec, Canada	Fight of the Night.
Loss	28–6	Georges St-Pierre	Decision (unanimous)	UFC 154	November 17, 2012	5	5:00	Montreal, Quebec, Canada	For the UFC Welterweight Championship. Fight of the Night.
Win	28–5	Nick Diaz	Decision (unanimous)	UFC 143	February 4, 2012	5	5:00	Las Vegas, Nevada, United States	Won the interim UFC Welterweight Championship.
Win	27–5	Dong Hyun Kim	KO (flying knee and punches)	UFC 132	July 2, 2011	1	2:58	Las Vegas, Nevada, United States	Knockout of the Night.
Win	26–5	Dan Hardy	KO (punch)	UFC 120	October 16, 2010	1	4:27	London, England	Knockout of the Night.
Win	25–5	Rory MacDonald	TKO (punches)	UFC 115	June 12, 2010	3	4:53	Vancouver, British Columbia, Canada	Fight of the Night.
Win	24–5	Jake Ellenberger	Decision (split)	UFC Fight Night: Diaz vs. Guillard	September 16, 2009	3	5:00	Oklahoma City, Oklahoma, United States	
Loss	23–5	Martin Kampmann	Decision (split)	UFC Fight Night: Condit vs. Kampmann	April 1, 2009	3	5:00	Nashville, Tennessee, United States	
Win	23–4	Hiromitsu Miura	TKO (punches)	WEC 35	August 3, 2008	4	4:43	Las Vegas, Nevada, United States	Defended the WEC Welterweight Championship. Fight of the Night.
Win	22–4	Carlo Prater	Submission (guillotine choke)	WEC 32	February 13, 2008	1	3:48	Rio Rancho, New Mexico, United States	Defended the WEC Welterweight Championship.
Win	21–4	Brock Larson	Submission (armbar)	WEC 29	August 5, 2007	1	2:21	Las Vegas, Nevada, United States	Defended the WEC Welterweight Championship.
Win	20–4	John Alessio	Submission (rear-naked choke)	WEC 26	March 24, 2007	2	4:59	Las Vegas, Nevada, United States	Won the vacant WEC Welterweight Championship.
Win	19–4	Kyle Jensen	Submission (rear-naked choke)	WEC 25	January 20, 2007	1	2:10	Las Vegas, Nevada, United States	
Win	18–4	Tatsunori Tanaka	KO (stomp)	Pancrase: Blow 9	October 25, 2006	1	2:13	Tokyo, Japan	
Win	17–4	Takuya Wada	Submission (kimura)	Pancrase: Blow 7	September 16, 2006	3	4:22	Tokyo, Japan	
Win	16–4	Koji Oishi	TKO (doctor stoppage)	Pancrase: 2006 Neo-Blood Tournament Finals	July 28, 2006	3	1:01	Tokyo, Japan	
Loss	15–4	Pat Healy	Submission (rear-naked choke)	Extreme Wars 3: Bay Area Brawl	June 3, 2006	3	2:53	Oakland, California, United States	
Loss	15–3	Jake Shields	Decision (unanimous)	Rumble on the Rock 9	April 21, 2006	3	5:00	Honolulu, Hawaii, United States	ROTR Welterweight Tournament Final.
Win	15–2	Frank Trigg	Submission (triangle armbar)	Rumble on the Rock 9	April 21, 2006	1	1:22	Honolulu, Hawaii, United States	ROTR Welterweight Tournament Semifinal.
Win	14–2	Renato Verissimo	TKO (knees and punches)	Rumble on the Rock 8	January 20, 2006	1	0:17	Honolulu, Hawaii, United States	ROTR Welterweight Tournament Quarterfinal.
Win	13–2	Ross Ebañez	TKO (punches)	Rumble on the Rocks: Just Scrap	November 5, 2005	1	1:27	Hilo, Hawaii, United States	
Loss	12–2	Satoru Kitaoka	Submission (heel hook)	Pancrase: Spiral 8	October 2, 2005	1	3:57	Yokohama, Japan	
Win	12–1	Chilo Gonzalez	Submission (armbar)	Ring of Fire 19: Showdown	September 10, 2005	1	1:06	Castle Rock, Colorado, United States	
Win	11–1	Masaki Tuchhi	KO (head kick)	Professional No Rules Fight: Demolition	June 18, 2005	1	4:35	Albuquerque, New Mexico, United States	
Win	10–1	Randy Hauer	KO (punches)	FightWorld 3	November 27, 2004	1	1:27	Albuquerque, New Mexico, United States	
Win	9–1	Will Bradford	TKO (punches)	Independent Event	November 13, 2004	1	1:30	New Mexico, United States	
Loss	8–1	Carlo Prater	Submission (triangle choke)	FightWorld 2	September 11, 2004	1	2:51	Albuquerque, New Mexico, United States	
Win	8–0	Brandon Melendez	Submission (triangle choke)	Ring of Fire 12: Nemesis	May 22, 2004	1	0:50	Castle Rock, Colorado, United States	
Win	7–0	Jarvis Brennaman	Submission (armbar)	KOTC 35: Acoma	February 28, 2004	1	0:34	Acoma, New Mexico, United States	
Win	6–0	Brad Gumm	TKO (punches)	Ring of Fire 11: Bring it On	January 10, 2004	1	1:11	Castle Rock, Colorado, United States	
Win	5–0	David Lindemeyer	Submission (armbar)	KOTC 26: Gladiator Challenge	August 3, 2003	1	0:46	Acoma, New Mexico, United States	
Win	4–0	Tyrell McElroy	Submission (arm-triangle choke)	Triple Threat: Fight Night 1	April 6, 2003	1	2:49	Albuquerque, New Mexico, United States	
Win	3–0	Anthony Zamora	TKO (punches)	Independent Event	March 15, 2003	1	0:29	Acoma, New Mexico, United States	
Win	2–0	Tommy Gouge	Submission (armbar)	Reality Fighting Championships 1	January 25, 2003	1	0:45	Oklahoma City, Oklahoma, United States	
Win	1–0	Nick Roscorla	Submission (rear-naked choke)	Aztec Challenge 1	September 6, 2002	1	0:52	Ciudad Juárez, Mexico	

== Pay-per-view bouts ==
No.	Event	Fight	Date	Venue	City	PPV Buys
1.	UFC 143	Diaz vs. Condit	February 4, 2012	Mandalay Bay Events Center	Las Vegas, Nevada, United States	400,000
2.	UFC 154	St-Pierre vs. Condit	November 17, 2012	Bell Centre	Montreal, Quebec, Canada	700,000
3.	UFC 195	Lawler vs. Condit	January 2, 2016	MGM Grand Garden Arena	Las Vegas, Nevada, United States	230,000

== Professional boxing record ==
0 wins, 1 loss, 0 draws
Res.	Record	Opponent	Type	Rd., time	Date	Location	Notes
Loss	0–1	(United States) Donnel Wade	SD	4	2004-04-10	Albuquerque Convention Center, Albuquerque, New Mexico	

== Kickboxing record ==
Kickboxing record
3 wins (2 KOs), 1 loss, 0 draws
Date	Result	Opponent	Event	Location	Method	Round	Time	Record
2005-12-10	Win	(United States) Pete Spratt	Ring of Fire 20: Elite	Castle Rock, Colorado, USA	Decision (unanimous)	3	3:00	3-1
2005-04-09	Win	(United States) Cruz Chacon	Ring of Fire 16: No Limit	Castle Rock, Colorado, USA	KO (strikes)	1	2:05	2-1
2005-02-12	Win	(United States) Marcus Davis	Ring of Fire 15: Inferno	Castle Rock, Colorado, USA	TKO (strikes)	2	1:03	1-1
2003-09-23	Loss	(Netherlands) Andy Souwer	Shootboxing: "S" of the World, Vol. 5	Tokyo, Japan	TKO (low kicks)	5	2:43	0-1
Legend: Win Loss Draw/no contest Notes

== See also ==
- List of male mixed martial artists

Vacant Title last held by Georges St-Pierre	2nd UFC Interim Welterweight Champion; February 4, 2012 – November 17, 2012	Vacant Title next held by Colby Covington
Vacant Title last held by Mike Pyle	5th WEC Welterweight Champion; March 24, 2007 – February 3, 2009	Vacant WEC Welterweight division was dissolved into the UFC
