= Jake Shields =

American far-right activist and former mixed martial artist (born 1979)

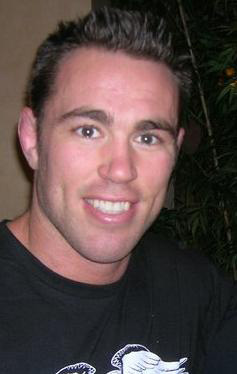
- Shields in 2010
- Born: January 9, 1979 (age 47); Mountain Ranch, California, U.S.
- Height: 6 ft 0 in (1.83 m)
- Weight: 170 lb (77 kg; 12 st 2 lb)
- Division: Welterweight; Middleweight
- Reach: 72 in (183 cm)
- Style: Submission wrestling
- Fighting out of: San Francisco, California, U.S.
- Team: Cesar Gracie Jiu-Jitsu; El Niño Sports; Fairtex Gym
- Rank: Black belt in BJJ; A-Class Shootist
- Wrestling: NCAA Division II Wrestling
- Years active: 1999–2018 (MMA)

Mixed martial arts record
- Total: 46
- Wins: 33
- By knockout: 3
- By submission: 12
- By decision: 18
- Losses: 11
- By knockout: 4
- By submission: 1
- By decision: 6
- Draws: 1
- No contests: 1

Other information
- University: San Francisco State University
- Notable schools: Cuesta College; Calaveras High School
- Website: www.jakeshields.com
- Mixed martial arts record from Sherdog
Medal record
Representing United States
Men's submission wrestling
ADCC World Championship
Bronze medal – third place	2005 Abu Dhabi -77kg
Men's Brazilian jiu jitsu
Pan-American Jiu-Jitsu Championship
Gold medal – first place	2005 California, USA -82kg (purple)

YouTube information
- Channel: Jake Shields’ Fight Back Podcast
- Years active: 2009–present
- Genre: Podcast
- Subscribers: 230 thousand
- Views: 72 million
- Last updated on: November 20, 2026

Jake Shields (born January 9, 1979) is a right-wing American political activist, podcaster, and former mixed martial artist.

Shields was the last Rumble on the Rock Welterweight Champion, the only Elite XC Welterweight Champion, a former Shooto Welterweight Champion and former Strikeforce Middleweight Champion. He notably held a 15-fight winning streak for six years, which was carried over to the Ultimate Fighting Championship (UFC), unitil it was broken in a loss to Georges St. Pierre in a UFC Welterweight Championship fight. He described his style as "American Jiu-Jitsu".

Following his retirement from combat sports, Shields transitioned into online political commentary, hosting the Fight Back podcast. He has promoted white nationalist, antisemitism including Holocaust denial, anti-LGBTQ rhetoric and conspiracy theories.

== Early life ==
Jake Shields was born on January 9, 1979 to his father Jack and mother Billie, he was raised near Mountain Ranch, California. Shields began wrestling at the age of nine and went on to wrestle at Calaveras High School where he finished in 2nd Place at the AAU (Amateur Athletic Union) National Freestyle Championships. Following high school, he attended junior college and was a two-time junior college All American wrestler at Cuesta College. During his time at Cuesta Shields, he would begin to train MMA with Chuck Lindell who was friends with the Cuesta wrestling coach.

In 2001, he received a wrestling scholarship to San Francisco State University where he wrestled for one year. By 2002, Shields began training at the Cesar Gracie Gym and dropped out of school to focus on fighting.

== Mixed martial arts career ==
Shields is perhaps best known for his 15-fight winning streak, finishing eight of his eleven opponents before being defeated by UFC welterweight champion Georges St-Pierre in a unanimous decision in a five-round battle at UFC 129. Shields has captured the Shooto World Mixed Martial Arts Championship and the Rumble on the Rock World Championship. He submitted Nick Thompson via guillotine choke in a bout for the Elite XC Welterweight Championship.

He finished in 3rd place at the ADCC Submission Fighting World Championship in 2005.

At Strikeforce: Lawler vs. Shields, he fought EliteXC's last middleweight champion and former two-time ICON Sport middleweight champion at a catchweight of 182 pounds (83 kg). Shields pounced and secured a guillotine choke to finish his opponent via submission at 2:02 of the first round.

At Strikeforce: Fedor vs. Rogers, he fought Jason 'Mayhem' Miller for the vacant Strikeforce Middleweight Championship after Cung Le stepped down as champion to pursue his acting career. Shields defeated Miller via unanimous decision.

Shields successfully defended his title, defeating former Pride World Welterweight and Pride Middleweight Champion Dan Henderson via unanimous decision on April 17, 2010, at Strikeforce: Nashville.

=== Ultimate Fighting Championship ===
On June 30, 2010, Strikeforce released Shields from the organization. In July 2010, it was reported that Shields was close to signing a deal with the Ultimate Fighting Championship (UFC).

Shields made his UFC debut against Martin Kampmann on October 23, 2010, at UFC 121. Shields defeated Kampmann via split decision.

Shields fought Georges St-Pierre for the UFC Welterweight Championship on April 30, 2011, at UFC 129 in Toronto. Shields lost via unanimous decision.

Shields faced Jake Ellenberger on September 17, 2011, at UFC Fight Night 25, losing via first-round TKO.

He faced Yoshihiro Akiyama on February 26, 2012, at UFC 144, winning via unanimous decision.

Shields returned to the middleweight division and faced Ed Herman on August 11, 2012, at UFC 150. Initially, he was declared the winner via unanimous decision.

On October 12, 2012, however, it was announced that Shields had failed his drug test at UFC 150 since the test revealed that he had used a banned performance enhancing drug, and he was subsequently fined and suspended for six months. The result of the fight was changed to a No Contest. In January 2015, Shields said the failed test was due to a banned diuretic.

Shields faced Tyron Woodley in a welterweight bout on June 15, 2013, at UFC 161. The bout was contested on the feet for nearly its entirety in a largely uneventful fight where neither fighter was able to deliver any significant offense. Shields defeated Woodley via split decision.

Shields next faced Demian Maia on October 9, 2013, at UFC Fight Night 29. As expected, the contest between the two jiu jitsu practitioners took place mostly on the ground, and Shields won via split decision.

He fought Héctor Lombard on March 15, 2014, at UFC 171. Shields lost the fight via unanimous decision.

On April 6, 2014, Shields was released from the promotion.

After Shields was released from the UFC, the outspoken and often candid president of the organization, Dana White, had this to say about Shields:

"Mixed martial arts is a young man's game. I like Jake Shields a lot. But let's be honest here: Where was he going in this [welterweight] division of animals we have? He's on the downswing, and he's never going to be the guy. His stand-up never improved. He hasn't really shown anything in his last couple of fights to make you go, 'Holy [expletive].' Right now, at this point, he's just another guy."

=== World Series of Fighting ===
In April 2014, Shields signed a multi-fight deal with the World Series of Fighting. Shields was expected to compete at WSOF 11 on July 5, 2014, against Jon Fitch, but withdrew due to a shoulder injury.

Shields made his debut for World Series of Fighting at WSOF 14 on October 11, 2014, in Edmonton, Canada against WSOF Canadian Welterweight Champion Ryan Ford. He won via submission in the first round.

Shield next faced Brian Foster in the main event at WSOF 17 on January 17, 2015. He again won the fight via submission in the first round.

Shields faced Rousimar Palhares on August 1, 2015, at WSOF 22. He lost the fight by submission due to a kimura, marking his first loss by submission. This wasn't without controversy as Palhares repeatedly eye gouged Shields after several warnings from the ref, Palhares also held onto the submission well after Shields had tapped. In response, Shields punched Palhares in the face after the fight was over, and attempted a kick which the referee blocked. Both Shields and Palhares were temporarily suspended by the NSAC after the fight.

Shields was lined up to face Jon Fitch for the vacant WSOF welterweight championship at WSOF 30 on April 1, 2016. The match was canceled due to contract issues between Shields and the company.

It was announced that Shields would challenge for the WSOF Welterweight Championship against Jon Fitch on November 12, 2016, at WSOF 34. The fight was then rescheduled to December 31, 2016, in the co-main event. Shields lost the fight by unanimous decision.

=== Professional Fighters League ===
Shields made his PFL debut at PFL Everett on July 29, 2017, against Danny Davis Jr. He won the bout via unanimous decision.

On July 5, 2018, Shields made his PFL season debut at PFL 3. Despite being a heavy favorite, he lost to Ray Cooper III via technical knockout in the second round.

On August 16, 2018, Shields defeated Herman Terrado at PFL 6 via unanimous decision advancing to the playoffs.

On October 20, 2018, Shields faced Ray Cooper III in a rematch at PFL 10. He lost the fight via technical knockout in the first round.

=== Grappling events ===
On November 22, 2014, Shields fought Roberto Satoshi in a grappling match in Metamoris V. The fight ended in a draw.

On April 2, 2016, Shields then fought AJ Agazarm at Polaris 3. The match was controversial as it was plagued with eye gouges and strikes coming from both fighters. At one point in the match Shields slapped Agazarm while both men were standing. The fight ended in a draw.

On January 19, 2019, Shields fought Ron Keslar for the Fight 2 Win Middleweight Championship. Shields won the match via decision.

Shields defeated Diego Sanchez in a grappling match at High Rollerz 4 on February 5, 2020.

=== Television and film ===
Shields stars in and co-produced Fight Life, an award-winning documentary on the sport of MMA, the film is directed by James Z. Feng and released in 2013. Shields appeared in three episodes of Bully Beatdown on MTV and MTV2 on April 12, 2009, and a different episode on September 10. Shields also served as a grappling coach for Chuck Liddell on The Ultimate Fighter 11, and appeared on the Animal Planet channel for episodes of Wild Recon and Venom in Vegas.

== Fighting style ==
Shields was known for a grappling-oriented fighting style centered on relentless pressure, wrestling, positional control, and submission attempts. He frequently sought to take opponents down and maintain top position, using his strength and persistent chain wrestling to wear opponents down before advancing to dominant positions such as mount or back control. A skilled Brazilian jiu-jitsu practitioner, Shields regularly pursued submissions, particularly rear-naked chokes, while incorporating ground-and-pound. His tendency to prioritize control and positional dominance over damage occasionally led critics to characterize his style as "lay-and-pray", stalling and relying on prolonged periods of top control to secure decision victories instead of actively pursuing damage or submissions.

== Political views and activism ==
Avatar of Jake Shields

Jake Shields
(@jakeshieldsajj)
tweeted:

Would you support public executions of anyone who helps a child transition? This would include doctors, therapists, teachers, guidance counselors, etc

April 26, 2023

Jake Shields has been described as a right-wing conspiracy theorist, as a far right antisemitic media personality, and as a member of the manosphere who traffics in homophobia.

In late 2022, Shields had over 340,000 Twitter followers, and was briefly suspended for anti-trans posting. On December 28, 2022, following an online altercation between climate activist Greta Thunberg and influencer Andrew Tate, Shields suggested that Tate should give Thunberg a "proper smashing" so that she abandons her "crazy feminist/climate nonsense".

On April 25, 2023, Shields had addressed support via a tweet, which was later deleted for violating Twitter's terms of service, for the public executions of people who help a child transition their gender, and recommended that doctors, therapists, teachers, and guidance counselors be publicly executed for their assistance in helping the gender transitions of children.

In September 2023, Shields supported the social media campaign to ban the Anti-Defamation League (ADL) from Twitter.

Following the 2023 October 7 attacks and subsequent Gaza war, Shields has presented himself as a pro-Palestinian activist, amassing followers on social media for posting content focusing on the war. In March 2024, the ADL described him as an "antisemitic conspiracy theorist" after he claimed that Israel created the terrorist group ISIS. In July 2024, the ADL identified him as one of five key far-right influencers on X who had used the conflict to gain an audience, whose combined follower count increased by over 1,070% in the period, with Shields reaching over 760,000 in late 2023. It described him as having "a history of espousing a range of hateful tropes and narratives including antisemitism, anti-Zionism, the Great Replacement theory, anti-LGBTQ+ rhetoric and more." Shields has posted photos showing the effects of Israeli attacks on the Gaza Strip, as well as content about the alleged persecution of white people by Jews.

Shields is also a proponent of Holocaust denial, saying in a post on X in February 2024: “I don't think a single Jew died in gas chambers.” In January 2025, Shields hosted Holocaust denier Germar Rudolf on his show and defended his claims. When questioned about this by the Southern Poverty Law Center, Shields responded "“you slimy jews jailed a man for proving your lies. And you want to do the same with me. You are (sic) sick and demonic individual."

One May 2024 post on X, according to the ADL, was viewed over 1.3 million times and has 21K likes and said that Jews control America, as Congress is “making it illegal to question Jewish power.” Public Discourse alleged that "he has spread multiple blood libels with impunity".

In June 2024, Shields and Nick Fuentes were prevented from attending a conference of the right-wing Turning Point USA and instead attended a far-right rally in Detroit originally organized by Fuentes as the 2024 America First Political Action Conference (AFPAC), and also attended by Sulaiman Ahmed, an online influencer, and David Duke, former grand wizard of the Ku Klux Klan. Shields also hosted David Duke on his podcast and described him as a "nice old man". Shields fell out with Fuentes amid allegations that Fuentes was a federal agent.

In late 2024, the advocacy group StopAntisemitism listed him as a candidate for the category of "Antisemite of the year". Shields called the nomination a "massive honour and hopefully I'll win antisemite of 2024."

Shields has also hosted several male supremacists on his show, including Myron Gaines, Sneako and Walter Weekes. Sneako made several antisemitic comments on the show in November 2024, blaming Israel for the 9/11 attacks and a "Jewish mafia" for promoting feminism. In December 2024, Shields used his show to advocate violence against healthcare providers who support trans children.

In February 2025, Shields hosted antisemitic content producer Ayo Kimathi, making allegations about Jewish control of the slave trade; the episode was removed by YouTube for violating its hate speech policies. In March 2025, while hosting an Australian neo-Nazi on his podcast, Shields praised Adolf Hitler and Nazi policies, claiming that Hitler "wasn't pushing hatred towards other races". He also defended the Nazi book burnings, claiming the books targeted "were, like, tranny books and communist books". He hosted the Irish neo-Nazi Justin Barrett on his podcast in May 2026, where Barrett claimed that Jewish people were pushing worldwide abortion laws. Other far right figures he has platformed on his accounts are white nationalist Thomas Rousseau, Holocaust denier E. Michael Jones, antisemitic influencer Ian Carroll and neo-Nazi Paul Miller.

By November 2025, Shields had 800,000 followers on Twitter and 200,000 on Instagram. In May 2026, he was flagged on Twitter for stating he was a Holocaust denialist, and that the Holocaust was "a fiction of the Jewish imagination."

In May 2026, he endorsed Dan Bilzerian's congressional campaign, and called his election bid against his opponent, the incumbent Randy Fine, "the most important election" in the 2026 midterms.

== Personal life ==
Shields has a daughter, born December 2000. On August 29, 2011, Shields' father and manager, Jack Shields, died at age 67.

Shields is a lifelong vegetarian. He appeared in both print and video ads for PETA, touting his vegetarian lifestyle. Shields is critical of vaccines.

On September 21, 2023, he failed to appear at an arraignment in a Nevada court. He was charged with misdemeanor battery related to an altercation between himself and Mike Jackson, and a bench warrant was issued for his arrest.

He has identified as a former atheist who now holds belief in a God.

== Championships and accomplishments ==
=== Amateur wrestling ===
- California Interscholastic Federation
  - CIF State Championship Qualifier (1997)

=== Mixed martial arts ===
- Ultimate Fighting Championship
  - UFC.com Awards
    - 2010: Ranked #2 Newcomer of the Year
- Strikeforce
  - Strikeforce Middleweight Championship (One time)
  - One successful title defense
- Elite Xtreme Combat
  - EliteXC Welterweight Championship (One time; first; last)
  - One successful title defense
- Professional Shooto Japan
  - Shooto Welterweight Championship (One time)
- Rumble on the Rock
  - Rumble on the Rock Welterweight Championship
  - Rumble on the Rock Welterweight Tournament Winner

=== Submission grappling ===
- Abu Dhabi Combat Club
  - 2005 ADCC Submission Wrestling World Championships - bronze medalist
- Fight 2 Win
  - FTW Middleweight Championship (One time, current)
- International Brazilian Jiu-Jitsu Federation
  - 2005 Pan American Championships - gold medalist
- International Gracie Jiu-Jitsu Federation
  - 2007 Gracie Open Superfight champion
- Grapplers Quest
  - Grapplers Quest Advance champion (three times)

== Mixed martial arts record ==
Professional record breakdown
46 matches	33 wins	11 losses
By knockout	3	4
By submission	12	1
By decision	18	6
Draws	1	
No contests	1	

Res.	Record	Opponent	Method	Event	Date	Round	Time	Location	Notes
Loss	33–11–1 (1)	Ray Cooper III	TKO (punches)	PFL 10	October 20, 2018	1	3:10	Washington, D.C., U.S.	2018 PFL Welterweight Quarterfinal bout
Win	33–10–1 (1)	Herman Terrado	Decision (unanimous)	PFL 6	August 16, 2018	3	5:00	Atlantic City, New Jersey, U.S.	
Loss	32–10–1 (1)	Ray Cooper III	TKO (punches)	PFL 3	July 5, 2018	2	2:09	Washington, D.C., U.S.	
Win	32–9–1 (1)	Danny Davis Jr.	Decision (unanimous)	PFL: Everett	July 29, 2017	3	5:00	Everett, Washington, U.S.	
Loss	31–9–1 (1)	Jon Fitch	Decision (unanimous)	WSOF 34	December 31, 2016	5	5:00	New York City, U.S.	For the WSOF Welterweight Championship.
Loss	31–8–1 (1)	Rousimar Palhares	Submission (kimura)	WSOF 22	August 1, 2015	3	2:02	Las Vegas, Nevada, U.S.	For the WSOF Welterweight Championship.
Win	31–7–1 (1)	Brian Foster	Submission (neck crank)	WSOF 17	January 17, 2015	1	2:51	Las Vegas, Nevada, U.S.	
Win	30–7–1 (1)	Ryan Ford	Submission (rear-naked choke)	WSOF 14	October 11, 2014	1	4:29	Edmonton, Alberta, Canada	
Loss	29–7–1 (1)	Héctor Lombard	Decision (unanimous)	UFC 171	March 15, 2014	3	5:00	Dallas, Texas, U.S.	
Win	29–6–1 (1)	Demian Maia	Decision (split)	UFC Fight Night: Maia vs. Shields	October 9, 2013	5	5:00	Barueri, Brazil	
Win	28–6–1 (1)	Tyron Woodley	Decision (split)	UFC 161	June 15, 2013	3	5:00	Winnipeg, Manitoba, Canada	
NC	27–6–1 (1)	Ed Herman	NC (overturned)	UFC 150	August 11, 2012	3	5:00	Denver, Colorado, U.S.	Middleweight bout. Unanimous decision win for Shields; overturned after he failed a drug test.
Win	27–6–1	Yoshihiro Akiyama	Decision (unanimous)	UFC 144	February 26, 2012	3	5:00	Saitama, Japan	
Loss	26–6–1	Jake Ellenberger	TKO (knee and punches)	UFC Fight Night: Shields vs. Ellenberger	September 17, 2011	1	0:53	New Orleans, Louisiana, U.S.	
Loss	26–5–1	Georges St-Pierre	Decision (unanimous)	UFC 129	April 30, 2011	5	5:00	Toronto, Ontario, Canada	For the UFC Welterweight Championship.
Win	26–4–1	Martin Kampmann	Decision (split)	UFC 121	October 23, 2010	3	5:00	Anaheim, California, U.S.	Return to Welterweight.
Win	25–4–1	Dan Henderson	Decision (unanimous)	Strikeforce: Nashville	April 17, 2010	5	5:00	Nashville, Tennessee, U.S.	Defended the Strikeforce Middleweight Championship. Later vacated title.
Win	24–4–1	Jason Miller	Decision (unanimous)	Strikeforce: Fedor vs. Rogers	November 7, 2009	5	5:00	Hoffman Estates, Illinois, U.S.	Won the vacant Strikeforce Middleweight Championship.
Win	23–4–1	Robbie Lawler	Submission (guillotine choke)	Strikeforce: Lawler vs. Shields	June 6, 2009	1	2:02	St. Louis, Missouri, U.S.	Middleweight debut.
Win	22–4–1	Paul Daley	Submission (armbar)	EliteXC: Heat	October 4, 2008	2	3:47	Sunrise, Florida, U.S.	Defended the EliteXC Welterweight Championship. Later vacated title.
Win	21–4–1	Nick Thompson	Submission (guillotine choke)	EliteXC: Unfinished Business	July 26, 2008	1	1:03	Stockton, California, U.S.	Won the inaugural EliteXC Welterweight Championship.
Win	20–4–1	Mike Pyle	Submission (rear-naked choke)	EliteXC: Renegade	November 10, 2007	1	3:39	Corpus Christi, Texas, U.S.	
Win	19–4–1	Renato Verissimo	TKO (punches and elbows)	EliteXC: Uprising	September 15, 2007	1	4:00	Honolulu, Hawaii, U.S.	175 lb catchweight bout.
Win	18–4–1	Ido Pariente	Submission (rear-naked choke)	Dynamite!! USA	June 2, 2007	1	2:06	Los Angeles, California, U.S.	
Win	17–4–1	Ray Steinbeiss	Submission (guillotine choke)	Bodog Fight: Costa Rica Combat	February 18, 2007	1	1:29	San José, Costa Rica	
Win	16–4–1	Steve Berger	TKO (punches)	FCP: Malice at Cow Palace	September 9, 2006	2	1:36	San Francisco, California, U.S.	
Win	15–4–1	Carlos Condit	Decision (unanimous)	Rumble on the Rock 9	April 21, 2006	3	5:00	Honolulu, Hawaii, U.S.	Won the Rumble on the Rock Welterweight Tournament.
Win	14–4–1	Yushin Okami	Decision (majority)	Rumble on the Rock 9	April 21, 2006	3	5:00	Honolulu, Hawaii, U.S.	
Win	13–4–1	Dave Menne	Decision (unanimous)	Rumble on the Rock 8	January 20, 2006	3	5:00	Honolulu, Hawaii, U.S.	
Win	12–4–1	Toby Imada	Decision (unanimous)	Kage Kombat	November 12, 2005	3	5:00	California, U.S.	
Loss	11–4–1	Akira Kikuchi	Decision (unanimous)	Shooto: Year End Show 2004	December 14, 2004	3	5:00	Tokyo, Japan	Lost the Shooto Welterweight Championship.
Win	11–3–1	Ray Cooper Jr.	Submission (rear-naked choke)	Shooto Hawaii: Soljah Fight Night	July 9, 2004	1	3:29	Honolulu, Hawaii, U.S.	Won the vacant Shooto Welterweight Championship.
Draw	10–3–1	Kazuo Misaki	Draw	Pancrase - Hybrid 10	November 30, 2003	3	5:00	Tokyo, Japan	
Win	10–3	Akira Kikuchi	Decision (unanimous)	Shooto - 8/10 in Yokohama Cultural Gymnasium	August 10, 2003	3	5:00	Kanagawa, Japan	
Win	9–3	Milton Vieira	Decision (unanimous)	Shooto: Midwest Fighting	May 21, 2003	3	5:00	Hammond, Indiana, U.S.	
Win	8–3	Hayato Sakurai	Decision (unanimous)	Shooto: Year End Show 2002	December 14, 2002	3	5:00	Chiba, Chiba, Japan	
Loss	7–3	Ray Cooper Jr.	Decision (majority)	Warriors Quest 6: Best of the Best	August 3, 2002	3	5:00	Honolulu, Hawaii, U.S.	For the Warriors Quest Welterweight Championship.
Win	7–2	Robert Ferguson	Decision (unanimous)	GC 7: Casualties of War	November 4, 2001	2	5:00	Colusa, California, U.S.	
Win	6–2	Jeremy Jackson	Submission (rear-naked choke)	GC 6: Caged Beasts	September 9, 2001	1	2:03	Colusa, California, U.S.	
Win	5–2	Tracy Hess	Decision (unanimous)	GC 3: Showdown at Soboba	April 7, 2001	2	5:00	Friant, California, U.S.	
Win	4–2	Randy Velarde	Submission (rear-naked choke)	GC 2: Collision at Colusa	February 18, 2001	2	3:19	Colusa, California, U.S.	
Loss	3–2	Phillip Miller	Decision (unanimous)	IFC: Warriors Challenge 9	July 18, 2000	2	8:00	Friant, California, U.S.	
Win	3–1	Shannon Ritch	Submission (arm-triangle choke)	Best of the Best	May 4, 2000	1	2:45	Tempe, Arizona, U.S.	
Loss	2–1	Marty Armendarez	TKO (punches)	IFC: Warriors Challenge 6	March 25, 2000	1	7:34	Friant, California, U.S.	
Win	2–0	Brian Warren	Decision (unanimous)	CFF: The Cobra Challenge 1999	December 11, 1999	1	10:00	Anza, California, U.S.	
Win	1–0	Paul Harrison	TKO (punches)	CFF: The Cobra Qualifier 1999	October 23, 1999	1	3:22	Anza, California, U.S.	

== Submission grappling record ==
32 Matches, 17 Wins (4 Submissions), 11 Losses (5 Submissions), 4 Draws
Result	Rec.	Opponent	Method	Event	Division	Date	Location
Loss	17–11–4	Renato Canuto	Submission (flying armbar)	Third Coast Grappling 8	-85 kg	October 23, 2021	Phoenix, Arizona, U.S.
Win	17–10–4	Patrick Downey	Decision	Third Coast Grappling 8	-85 kg	October 23, 2021	Phoenix, Arizona, U.S.
Win	16–10–4	Eric Alequin	Decision (tech fall)	Third Coast Grappling 8	-85 kg	October 23, 2021	Phoenix, Arizona, U.S.
Loss	15–10–4	Brent Primus	Submission (armbar)	Submission Underground 14	Superfight	May 31, 2020	Portland, Oregon, U.S.
Loss	15–9–4	Richie Martinez	Submission (armbar)	Submission Underground 11	Superfight	February 23, 2020	Portland, Oregon, U.S.
Loss	15–8–4	Gilbert Burns	Decision	Quintet Ultra	Absolute	December 12, 2019	Las Vegas, Nevada, U.S.
Draw	15–7–4	Glover Teixeira	Draw	Quintet Ultra	Absolute	December 12, 2019	Las Vegas, Nevada, U.S.
Win	15–7–3	Cub Swanson	Injury	Quintet Ultra	Absolute	December 12, 2019	Las Vegas, Nevada, U.S.
Win	14–7–3	Mark Muñoz	Submission (arm-triangle choke)	Quintet Ultra	Absolute	December 12, 2019	Las Vegas, Nevada, U.S.
Loss	13–7–3	Romulo Barral	Referee decision	Third Coast Grappling 3	Superfight	December 7, 2019	Houston, Texas, U.S.
Win	13–6–3	Austin Vanderford	Quickest Escape	Submission Underground 8	Superfight	May 12, 2019	Portland, Oregon, U.S.
Loss	12–6–3	Rafael Lovato Jr.	Decision (unanimous)	Polaris 9	Superfight	March 15, 2019	London, England
Win	12–5–3	Ron Keslar	Decision (unanimous)	Fight 2 Win 98	Superfight - Won FTW Middleweight Championship	January 19, 2019	San Jose, California, U.S.
Loss	11–5–3	Craig Jones	Submission (heel hook)	Polaris 6	Superfight	February 17, 2018	London, England
Win	11–4–3	Kit Dale	Referee Decision	Fight to Win Pro 26	Superfight	February 10, 2018	Denver, Colorado, U.S.
Win	10–4–3	Gilbert Burns	Quickest Escape	Submission Underground 6	Superfight	December 3, 2017	Portland, Oregon, U.S.
Win	9–4–3	Murilo Santana	Referee Decision	Fight to Win Pro 51	Superfight	October 21, 2017	Brooklyn, New York City, U.S.
Loss	8–4–3	Abdurakhman Bilarov	Points	ADCC World Championship	–79 kg	September 23, 2017	Espoo, Finland
Win	8–3–3	Dan Strauss	Decision (unanimous)	Polaris 5	Superfight	August 19, 2017	London, England
Win	7–3–3	Dillon Danis	Quickest Escape	Submission Underground 4	Superfight	May 14, 2017	Portland, Oregon, U.S.
Win	6–3–3	Lyoto Machida	Submission (heel hook)	Fight to Win Pro	Superfight	August 13, 2016	Denver, Colorado, U.S.
Win	5–3–3	Chris Lytle	Quickest Escape	Submission Underground	Superfight	July 17, 2016	Portland, Oregon, U.S.
Draw	4–3–3	AJ Agazarm	Draw	Polaris 3	Superfight	April 2, 2016	Poole, England
Draw	4–3–2	Roberto de Souza	Draw	Metamoris 5	Superfight	November 22, 2014	Los Angeles, California, U.S.
Draw	4–2–1	Leandro Lo	Draw	World Jiu-Jitsu Expo	Superfight	November 10, 2013	Long Beach, California, U.S.
Loss	4–3	Marcelo Garcia	Submission (guillotine choke)	PSL X-Mission	Superfight	November 17, 2006	Los Angeles, California, U.S.
Loss	4–2	Saulo Ribeiro	Points	LA Sub X	Superfight	May 26, 2006	Los Angeles, California, U.S.
Win	4–1	Jon Fitch	Submission (rear-naked choke)	Gracie Open	Superfight	2005	San Francisco, California, U.S.
Win	3–1	Leonardo Santos	Submission (rear-naked choke)	ADCC World Championship	–77 kg	May 28, 2005	Los Angeles, California, U.S.
Loss	2–1	Pablo Popovitch	Points	ADCC World Championship	–77 kg	May 28, 2005	Los Angeles, California, U.S.
Win	2–0	Cameron Earle	Points	ADCC World Championship	–77 kg	May 28, 2005	Los Angeles, California, U.S.
Win	1–0	Diego Sanchez	Points	ADCC World Championship	–77 kg	May 28, 2005	Los Angeles, California, U.S.

== See also ==
- List of male mixed martial artists

Vacant Title last held by Cung Le	3rd Strikeforce Middleweight Champion; November 7, 2009 – July 1, 2010	Vacant Shields signed with the UFC Title next held by Ronaldo Souza
New championship	1st EliteXC Welterweight Champion; July 26, 2008 – October 20, 2008	Incumbent
Vacant Title last held by Anderson Silva	6th Shooto Middleweight Champion; July 9, 2004 – December 14, 2004	Succeeded by Akira Kikuchi
