= SENE =

American clothing brand

Sene
- Company type: Fashion Tech
- Industry: Retail
- Founded: 2019
- Founders: Ray Li & Mark Zheng
- Headquarters: Los Angeles, United States
- Areas served: U.S.
- Products: Men's and Women's Custom Clothing
- Website: senestudio.com

Sene is an American online custom clothing brand headquartered in Los Angeles.

== History ==
The company was initially started by Ray Li as a nights and weekend project while working full-time for brand consulting firm Interbrand. His cousin Mark Zheng joined in 2018 as a co-founder. After nearly going out of business, they pivoted the business and relaunched Sene in May 2019 with its first flagship product (The FlexTech Suit) on Kickstarter. That fall, Sene launched its custom jeans program for women and men.

The brand is headquartered in Los Angeles.

Sene is now also known for its made-to-order T-shirt program that is made in the United States.

== Collaborations ==
In September 2020, Sene worked with former welterweight UFC interim champion Carlos Condit to design a custom denim collection.

In November 2021, Sene partnered with Peloton instructor Emma Lovewell to design a custom denim collection.

In May 2023, Sene partnered with actor and entrepreneur Ashley Tisdale to design a custom denim collection.
