= Sene West (Ghana parliament constituency) =

Constituency in the Bono East Region of Ghana

- constituency for the Parliament of Ghana
- District: Sene District
- Region: Bono East Region of Ghana

Current constituency
- Party: National Democratic Congress
- MP: Kwame Twumasi Ampofo

Sene West is one of the constituencies represented in the Parliament of Ghana. It was created before the 2012 Ghanaian general election. It elects one Member of Parliament (MP) by the first past the post system of election. Sene West is located in the Bono East Region of Ghana. It was formed from the Sene constituency which at its inception in 1992, was a constituency in the defunct Brong Ahafo Region. Sene constituency was split into Sene East and Sene West in 2012. The Brong Ahafo Region was also spit into three, Bono, Ahafo and Bono East region. Sene West is now in Bono East.

== Boundaries ==
The seat is located within the Sene District of the Bono East Region of Ghana.

== Members of Parliament ==
First elected	Member	Party
Sene - created 1992
1992	Nana Yaw Atto	National Democratic Congress
2000	Felix Twumasi-Appiah	National Democratic Congress
Sene West - created 2012
2012	Kwame Twumasi Ampofo	National Democratic Congress

== Elections ==
2020 Ghanaian general election:Sene West
Party	Candidate	Votes	%	±%
National Democratic Congress	Kwame Twumasi Ampofo	13,116	49.67	−2.19
New Patriotic Party	Joseph Kumah Mackey	13,100	49.61	5.27
National Democratic Party	Caesar Fomeka	191	0.72	—
Majority		16	0.06	−7.46
Turnout		27,067	—	—
Registered electors		—		—

2016 Ghanaian general election: Sene West
Party	Candidate	Votes	%	±%
National Democratic Congress	Kwame Twumasi Ampofo	10,229	51.86	−12.29
New Patriotic Party	Joseph Mackey-Kumah	8,747	44.34	9.88
Peoples Progress Party	Dramani Manu	565	2.86	—
Convention People's Party	Daniyawu Mohammed	184	0.93	—
Majority		1,482	7.52	−22.17
Turnout		20,150	69.00	—
Registered electors		29,004		—

2012 Ghanaian general election:Sene West
Party	Candidate	Votes	%	±%
National Democratic Congress	Kwame Twumasi Ampofo	12,511	64.15	—
New Patriotic Party	Joseph Mackey-Kumah	6,721	34.46	—
People's National Convention	Mohammed Musah	195	1.00	—
National Democratic Party	Suhail Abdul Mumin	77	0.39	—
Majority		5,790	29.69	—
Turnout		—	—	—
Registered electors		—		—

Ghanaian parliamentary election, 2008 : Sene Source : Peacefmonline
Party	Candidate	Votes	%
NDC	FELIX TWUMASI-APPIAH	12,232	53.74
NPP	MOHAMMED BELINYI ABDULAI	9,440	41.47
CPP	EMMANUEL OSEI RAMSON	470	2.06
DPP	OPOKU SENKYIRE GABRIEL	315	1.38
PNC	SUMANI BAPIO ISSAHAKU	305	1.34

Ghanaian parliamentary election, 2004 : Sene Source : Peacefmonline
Party	Candidate	Votes	%
NDC	FELIX TWUMASI-APPIAH	20,775	69.50
NPP	SUNKWA-HYEAMAN ISAAC	8,640	28.90
CPP	YUSHAU HALLARU ALHAJI YUSSIF	479	1.60

Ghanaian parliamentary election, 2000 : Sene Source : Peacefmonline
Party	Candidate	Votes	%
NDC	Felix Twumasi-Appiah	14,567	68.10
NPP	Isaac Sunkwa-Hyeaman	5,152	24.10
NRP	Geoffrey Agbo	1,248	5.80
CPP	Abukasim Tahiru	428	2.00

Ghanaian parliamentary election, 1996 : Sene Source : Peacefmonline
Party	Candidate	Votes	%
NDC	Nana Yaw Otto	19,556	61.30
CPP	K. S. Odi-Asempa Daanyansah	4,957	15.50

== See also ==
- List of Ghana Parliament constituencies
- List of political parties in Ghana
