= Sene East (Ghana parliament constituency) =

Constituency in the Bono East Region of Ghana

- constituency for the Parliament of Ghana
- District: Sene District
- Region: Bono East Region of Ghana

Current constituency
- Party: National Democratic Congress
- MP: Dominic Napare

Sene East is one of the constituencies represented in the Parliament of Ghana. It elects one Member of Parliament (MP) by the first past the post system of election. Sene East is located in the Sene District of the Bono East Region.

== Boundaries ==
The seat is located within the Sene District of the Bono East Region of Ghana.

== Members of Parliament ==
Election	Member	Party
2012	DOMINIC NAPARE	NDC
2016	DOMINIC NAPARE	NDC

== Elections ==
2016 parliamentary election
Party	Candidate	Votes	%
NDC	DOMINIC NAPARE	9,936	67.07
NPP	MBANYIE ABRAHAM KWADWO	4,694	31.68
CPP	KOFI FAASEMKYE	185	1.25

2012 parliamentary election
Party	Candidate	Votes	%
NDC	DOMINIC NAPARE	10,343	66.93
NPP	ABDULAI MOHAMMED BELINYI	4,937	31.95
PPP	FERKA YAMBA RICHARD	173	1.12

== See also ==
- List of Ghana Parliament constituencies
- List of political parties in Ghana
