= Kajaji Settlement Town =

Kajaji
- Interactive map of Kajaji
- Coordinates: 7°47′0″N 0°13′0″W
- Country: Ghana
- Region: Bono East Region

Kajaji is a town in Bono East Region of Ghana. The town is also known as Nkomi Kajaji. It has a paramount chief and rotates among the three Royal clans in the paramountcy, namely Keleta, Kelempota, and Soome. The paramountcy stool is vacant due to protracted litigation between the Keleta and the Kelempota clans as to who succeeds the now-deceased Nana Kwabena Efeda.

The town of Kajaji has a population of about 65,000. The population contains Kraches (65%), Basares (12%), and other ethnic groups (23%). Main occupation of most of the inhabitants is agriculture. Majority practice both yam production and fishing on the Akosombo Lake, as the town is located in the Sene East District of the Bono East region, Ghana.

It has become the District Capital of Sene East on 30 June 2012. The district capital has been developing steadily with a buoyant market that receives visitors from all over the country for business activities to trade mainly in fish, meat, yam, and other foodstuffs.
