= Sene District =

- Former District
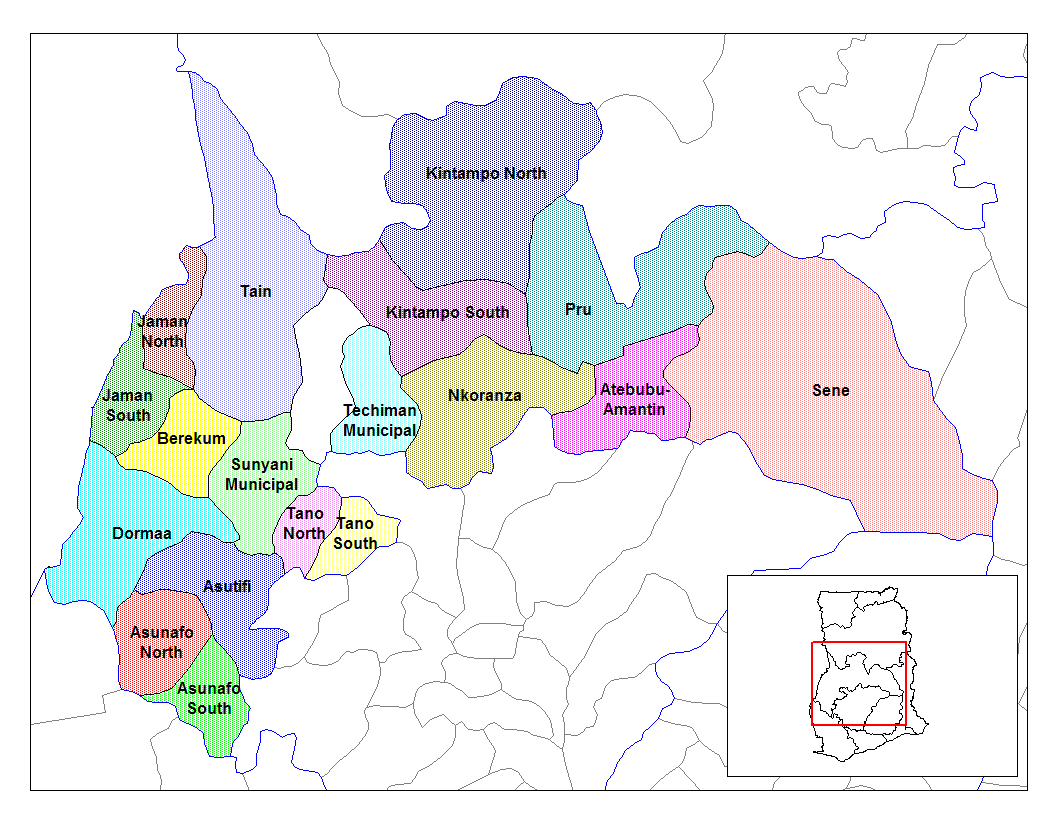
- Districts of Brong-Ahafo Region

- Location of Sene District within Brong-Ahafo
- Coordinates: 7°44′3.12″N 0°40′54.48″W
- Country: Ghana
- Region: Brong-Ahafo
- Capital: Kwame Danso

Government
  - District Executive: Dominic Napare

Area
  - Total: 6,657 km^{2} (2,570 sq mi)

Population (2012)
  - Total: —
- Time zone: UTC+0 (GMT)

Sene District is a former district that was located in Brong-Ahafo Region (now currently in Bono East Region), Ghana. It was originally created as an ordinary district assembly on 10 March 1989. However, on 28 June 2012, it was split off into two new districts: Sene West District (capital: Kwame Danso) and Sene East District (capital: Kajaji). The district assembly was located in the eastern part of Brong-Ahafo Region (now eastern part of Bono East Region) and had Kwame Danso as its capital town.

== List of settlements ==
Settlements of Sene District
No.	Settlement	Population	Population year
1	Akyeremade		
2	Bantama		
3	Bassa		
4	Bodinka		
5	Chiripo		
6	Drobe		
7	Kajaji		
8	Kirenkuase		
9	Kojokrom		
10	Kwame Danso		
11	Lassi		
12	Lemu Intrubuso		
13	Mframa		
14	Nyankontreh		
15	Okyeamekrom		
16	Premuase		
17	Tato Battor		
19	Wiase		

== Sources ==
- "Sene District". Statoids.
- District: Sene District

== See also ==
- Sene East District
- Sene West District
