= Kwame Danso =

Town in Bono East Region, Ghana

Coordinates: 7°44′N 0°41′W

- Interactive map of Kwame Danso
- Country: Ghana
- Region: Bono East Region

Kwame Danso is a town in the Bono East Region of Ghana. The town is known for the Kwame Danso Senior High Technical School. The school is a second cycle institution. The town was formerly called Donkore.
