= Nkoranza District =

- Former District
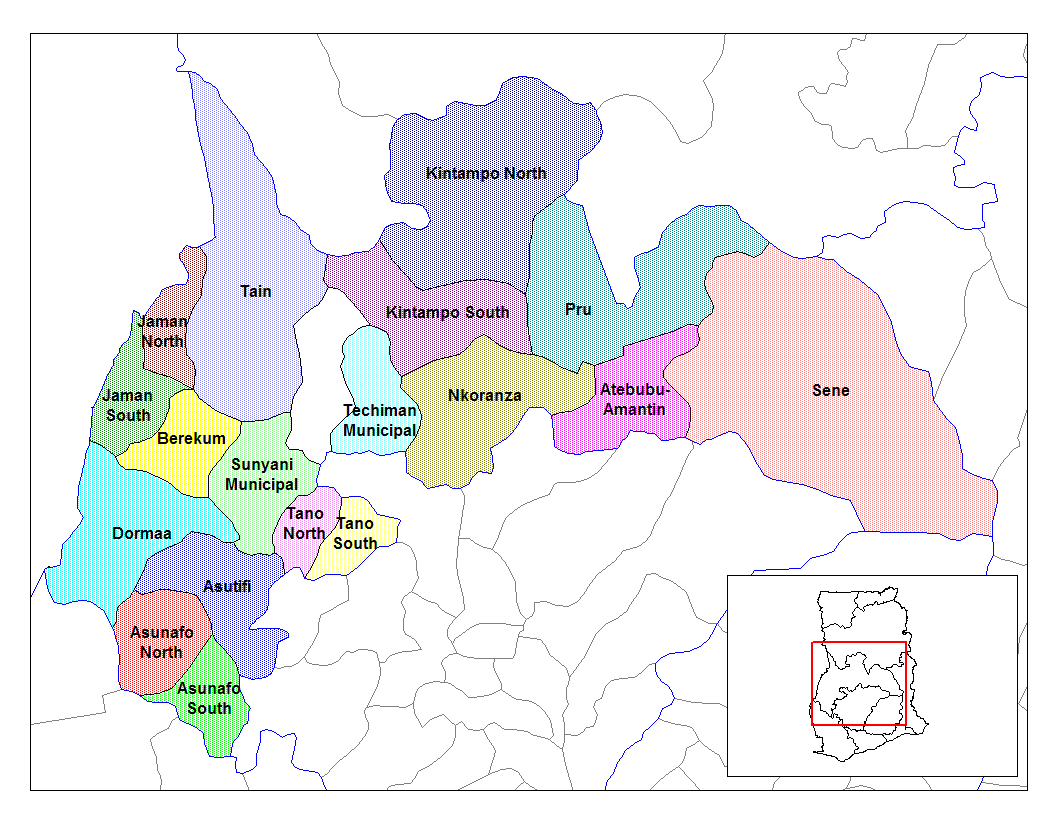
- Districts of Brong-Ahafo Region

- Location of Nkoranza District within Brong-Ahafo
- Coordinates: 7°34′8.4″N 1°42′7.2″W
- Country: Ghana
- Region: Brong-Ahafo
- Capital: Nkoranza

Area
  - Total: 2,584 km^{2} (998 sq mi)

Population (2012)
  - Total: —
- Time zone: UTC+0 (GMT)

Nkoranza District is a former district that was located in Brong-Ahafo Region (now currently in Bono East Region), Ghana. Originally created as an ordinary district assembly on 10 March 1989. However, on 1 November 2007 (effectively 29 February 2008), it was split off into two new districts: Nkoranza South District (which it was elevated to municipal district assembly status on 28 June 2012; capital: Nkoranza) and Nkoranza North District (capital: Busunya). The district assembly was located in the southern part of Brong-Ahafo Region (now southern part of Bono East Region) and had Nkoranza as its capital town.

== Sources ==
- "Nkoranza District". Statoids.
- District: Nkoranza District
- 19 New Districts Created , November 20, 2003.
