= Brong-Ahafo region =

Coordinates: 7°45′N 1°30′W

- Region
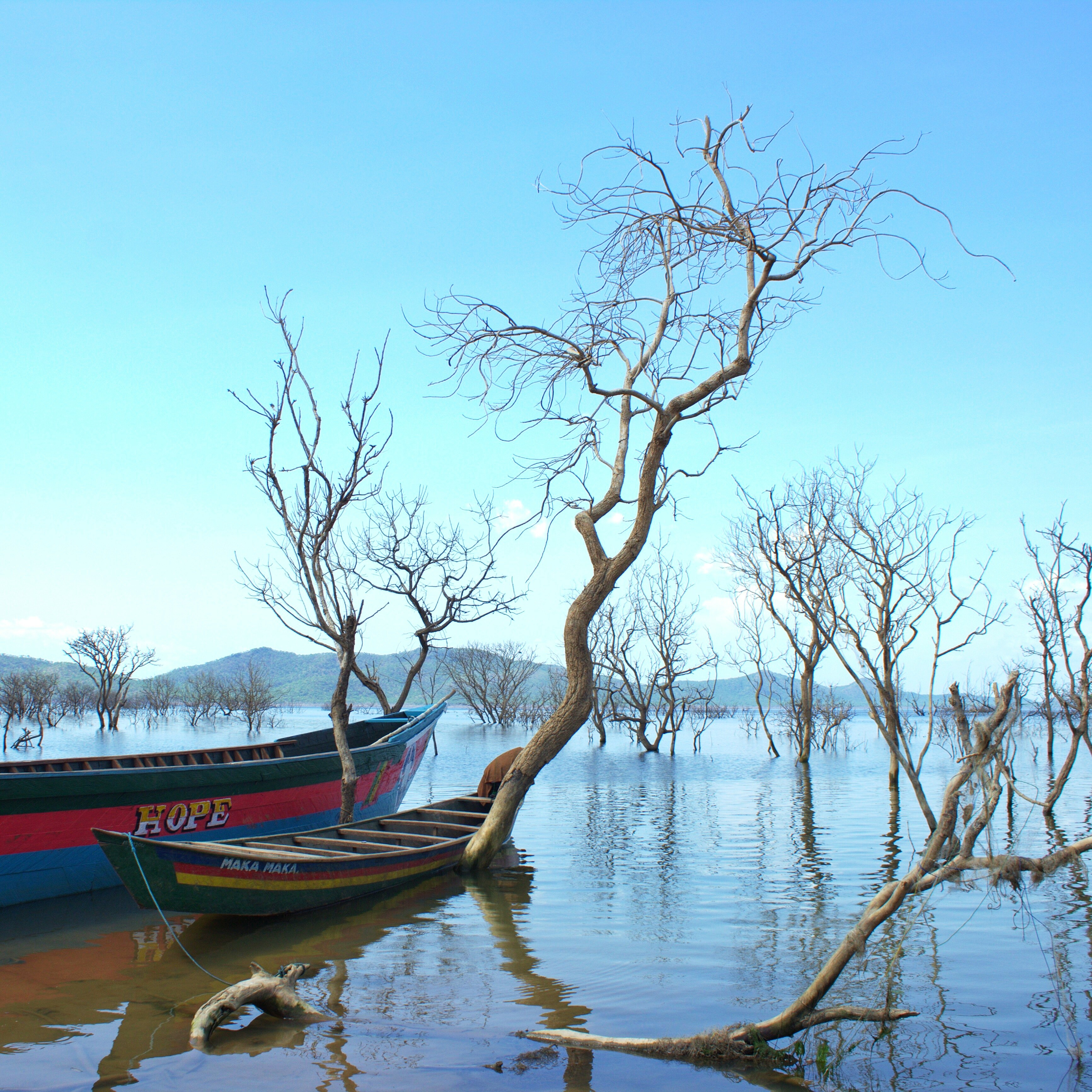
- Bui Bayou

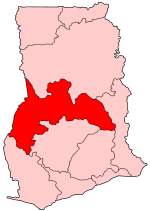
- Location of Brong-Ahafo region in Ghana
- Country: Ghana
- Capital: Sunyani
- Districts: 21

Government
  - Regional minister: Kwaku Asomah-Cheremeh

Area
  - Total: 39,557 km^{2} (15,273 sq mi)
  - Rank: Ranked 2nd

Population (2010 Census)
  - Total: 2,310,983
  - Rank: Ranked 6th
  - Density: 58.422/km^{2} (151.31/sq mi)

GDP (PPP)
  - Year: 2013
  - Per capita: $5,150

GDP (nominal)
  - Year: 2013
  - Per capita: $2,500
- Time zone: GMT
- Area code: 035
- ISO 3166 code: GH-BA
- HDI (2022): ▲0.591 medium· 6th

The Brong-Ahafo region was a region in central Ghana. Brong-Ahafo was bordered to the north by the Black Volta river and to the east by the Lake Volta, and to the south by the Ashanti, Eastern and Western regions. The capital of Brong-Ahafo is Sunyani. Brong-Ahafo was created on 14 April 1959 from the then Western Ashanti and named after the main ethnic groups, the Brong and Ahafo. In 2019, as a result of the 2018 Ghanaian new regions referendum, the region was divided into three, namely Bono, Bono East and Ahafo regions, and ceased to exist.

== Economy and tourism ==
Brong Ahafo is known for its large cocoa production and agribusiness industries. Brong-Ahafo contains many Akan cultural and wildlife attractions, but it is less known to tourists than the Ashanti or Central region. Attractions of Brong-Ahafo include Kintampo, with its waterfalls (Kintampo waterfalls) and nature reserves; Fiema, one of the communities which is home to the Boabeng-Fiema Monkey Sanctuary (a short distance outside Sunyani); national parks, Bui National Park and Digya National Park.

== Education ==
Paul Yeboah is the founder of the Ghana Permaculture Institute. The Ghana Permaculture Institute is a non-profit organization in Techiman (Brong Ahafo Region, Ghana). The purpose of the Institute is to train communities how to build and maintain stable food systems using Permaculture sustainable practices that restore, take care of local ecosystems, and to improve quality of life in rural and urban areas.

Universities in the area include the University of Energy and Natural Resources (UENR), Catholic University College of Ghana (CUCG), Anglican University of Technology (AnguTech), College of Science, Arts and Education (CSAE) and Sunyani Technical University.

== Sports ==
The region is renowned for producing a lot of elite athletes. Asamoah Gyan, Emmanuel Agyemang-Badu and John Paintsil are just a few of the numerous prominent sports personalities the region has produced. Currently, the region houses three of the 16 teams in the Ghana premier league. Aduana Stars F.C. is the traditional team of the Dormaa Traditional Area and it is based in Dormaa Ahenkro. They were promoted into the league for the first time in 2009 and emerged champions of the Ghana premier league that same year. In 2010 the premier league was won by Berekum Chelsea F.C., a club which is based in Berekum. Aduana Stars won the 2017 Ghanaian Premier League. Bechem United F.C. is the third Ghana Premier League team from the Brong-Ahafo Region.

== Districts ==
Districts of the Brong Ahafo region

The Brong Ahafo region was created in April 1959. It contained 27 districts. They were made up of 8 municipal and 19 ordinary districts as follows:

Districts in the Brong-Ahafo Region
#	District	Capital	Population
1	Asunafo North Municipal	Goaso	
2	Asunafo South	Kukuom	
3	Asutifi North	Kenyasi	
4	Asutifi South	Hwidiem	
5	Atebubu-Amantin Municipal	Atebubu	
6	Banda District	Banda Ahenkro	
7	Berekum East Municipal	Berekum	
8	Berekum West	Jinijini	
9	Dormaa East	Wamfie	
10	Dormaa Municipal	Dormaa Ahenkro	
11	Dormaa West	Nkrankwanta	
12	Jaman North	Sampa	
13	Jaman South Municipal	Drobo	
14	Kintampo North Municipal	Kintampo	
15	Kintampo South	Jema	
16	Nkoranza North	Busunya	
17	Nkoranza South Municipal	Nkoranza	
18	Pru		
19	Sene East	Kajaji	
20	Sene West	Kwame Danso	
21	Sunyani Municipal	Sunyani	
22	Sunyani West	Odumase	
23	Tain	Nsawkaw	
24	Tano North	Duayaw Nkwanta	
25	Tano South	Bechem	
26	Techiman Municipal	Techiman	
27	Techiman North	(Tuobodom)	
28	Wenchi Municipal	Wenchi	

== Notable people ==
Notable citizens of the Brong-Ahafo Region
Citizen	Settlement
Kevin-Prince Boateng	Kyeremasu, Dormaa East
Asamoah Gyan	Wenchi
James Kwesi Appiah	Sunyani
George Benneh	Jamdede
Emmanuel Agyemang-Badu	Seikwa
John Paintsil	Berekum
Kwadwo Afari-Gyan	Berekum
Ernest Asante	Sunyani
Saddick Adams	Sunyani
Nana Yaw Konadu Yeboah	Sunyani
Kwame Saarah-Mensah	Tanoso, Sunyani
