= Pru East District =

District in Bono East Region, Ghana

- District
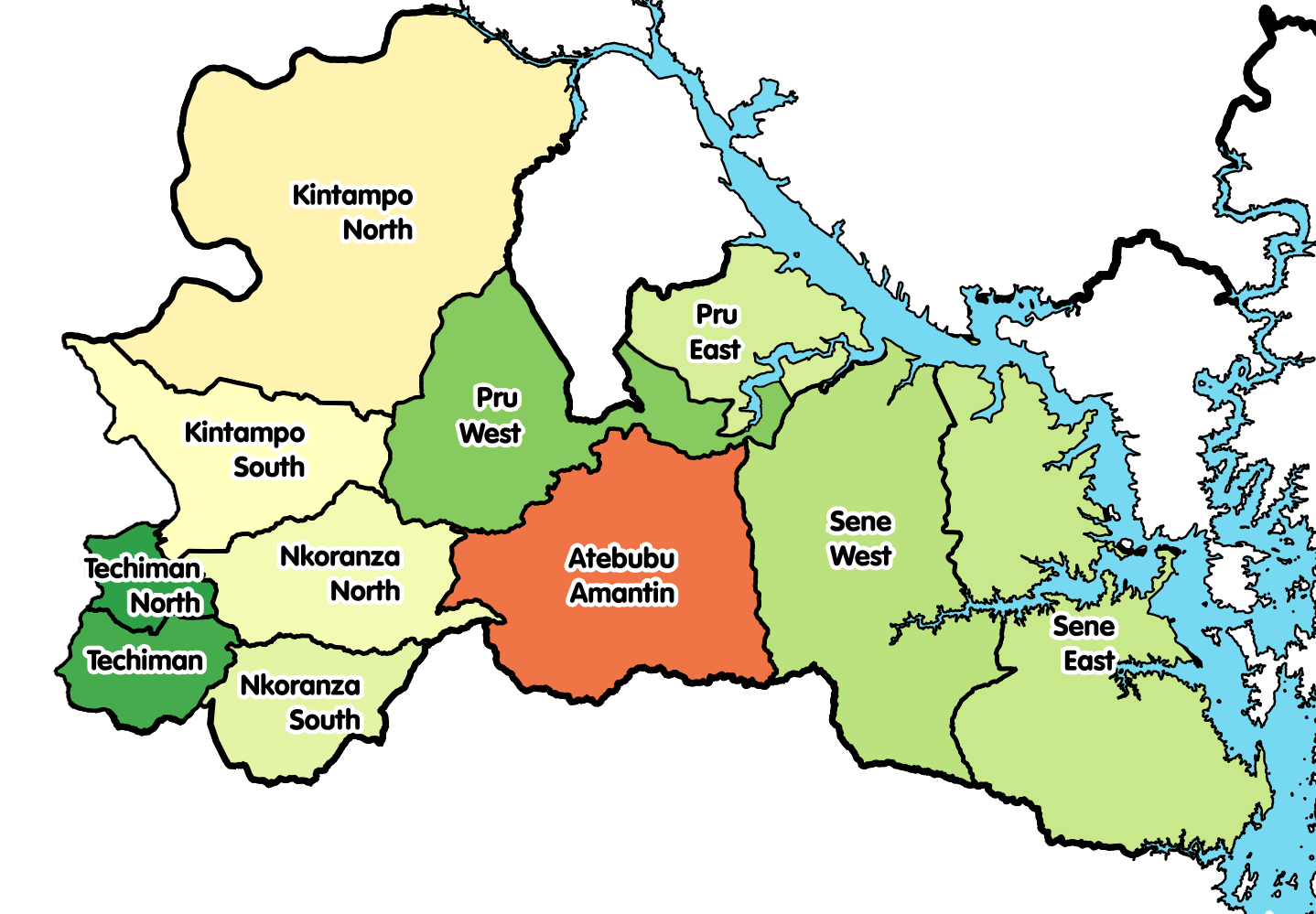
- Districts of Bono East Region

- Location of Pru East District within Bono East Region
- Coordinates: 8°13′34.32″N 0°39′12.96″W
- Country: Ghana
- Region: Bono East Region
- Capital: Yeji

Government
  - District Executive: Joshua Kwaku Abonkra

Area
  - Total: 1,178 km^{2} (455 sq mi)

Population (2021)
  - Total: 101,545
  - Density: 86.20/km^{2} (223.3/sq mi)
- Time zone: UTC+0 (GMT)

Pru East District is one of the eleven districts in Bono East Region, Ghana. Originally it was formerly part of the then-larger Pru District on 18 February 2004, until the western part of the district was split off to create Pru West District on 15 March 2018; thus the remaining part has been renamed as Pru East District. The district assembly is located in the east central part of Bono East Region and has Yeji as its capital town.

== Boundaries ==
The district is bounded on the north by the East Gonja Municipal District in the Savannah Region. To the east are the Sene East and Sene West districts. Its southern neighbours are the Nkoranza South Municipal District and the Atebubu-Amantin Municipal District and to the west is the Kintampo South District.

== Administration ==
The highest political and administrative authority in the region is the District Assembly. The administrative head of the district is the District Chief Executive who is appointed by the President of Ghana after consultation. There are other appointed members. There are also elected members from each electoral area within the district. The Member of Parliament for Pru East is elected in national elections and represents the district in the Parliament of Ghana.
