= Vehicle registration plates of Ghana =

Ghana
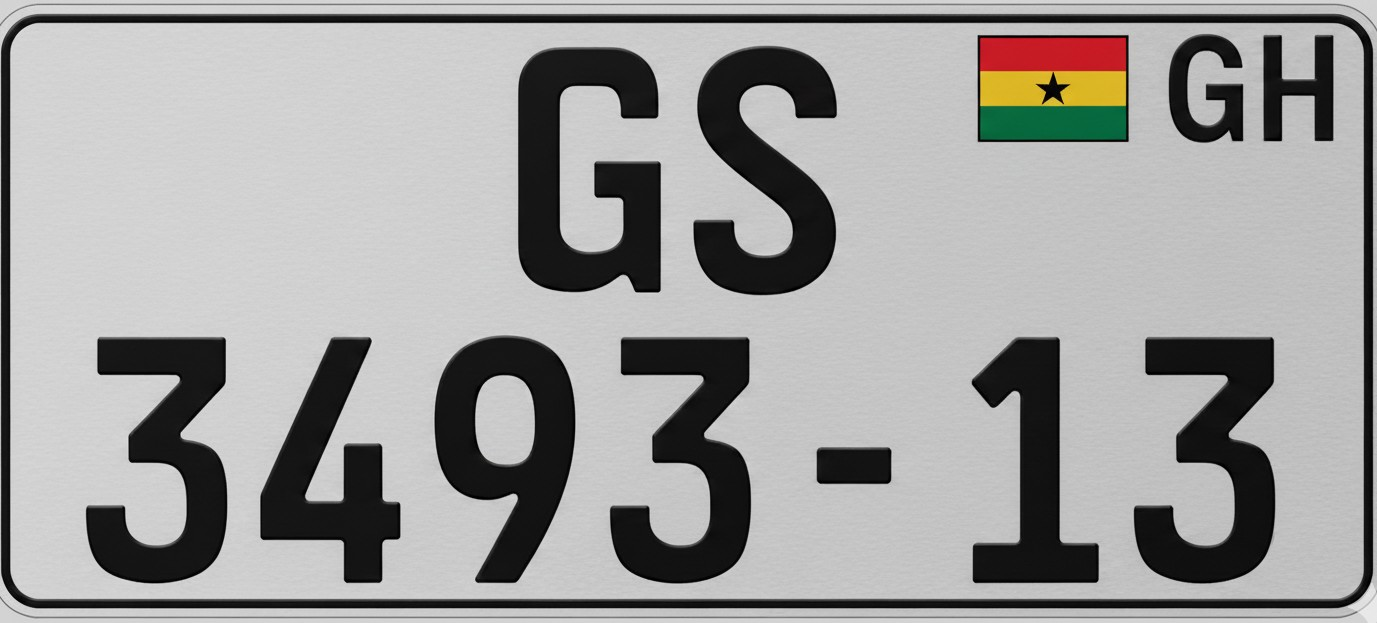
- License Plate of Ghana used on private vehicles registered in the Greater Accra Region
- Country: Ghana
- Country code: GH
- Colour (front): Black on white
- Colour (rear): Black on white

Vehicle registration plates of Ghana are issued by the Driver Vehicle License Authority.

The plates indicate the region where the vehicles were registered.

== Regulations ==
Ghana has no national restrictions on number plates. For example, a vehicle registered in the Ashanti Region can be used in the Brong-Ahafo Region.

A vehicle can be re-registered or a new license plate acquired under the following conditions:

- Vehicle bears a government registration plate and is transferred to a civilian.
- Vehicle bears a diplomatic plate and is transferred to a non-diplomat.
- Vehicle has a personalized plate and is transferred to a new owner.

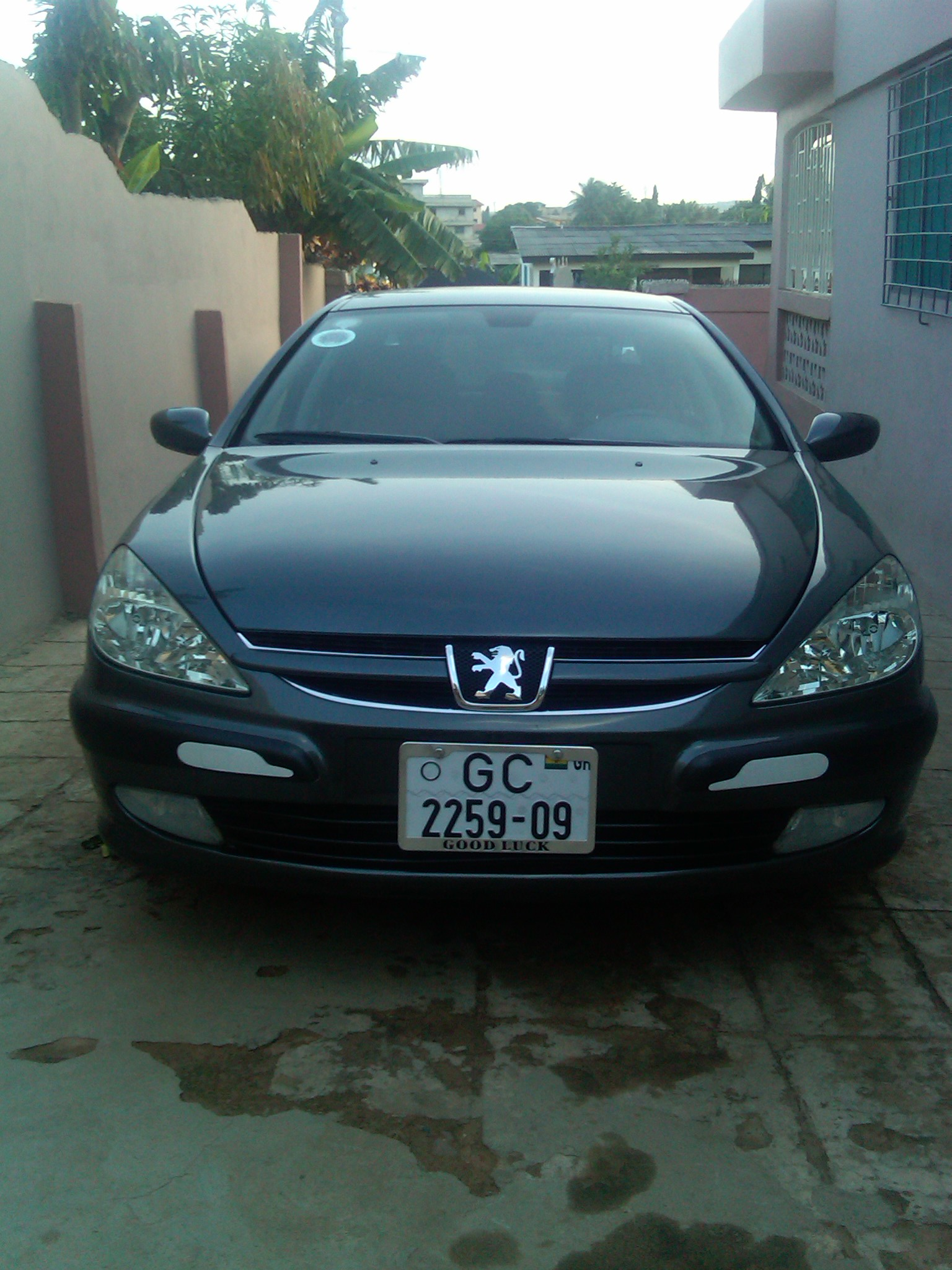
A Peugeot 607 which was registered in the Greater Accra Region in 2009 The image was captured at Santa Maria, a suburb of GA Central Municipal Assembly of the Greater Accra Region

== Format ==
The Ghanaian number plate format has been in use since January 2009. Ghanaian vehicle license plates consist of a two-letter region code, followed by a four-digit numeric and two-digit year code. The two-letter region code indicates the region in which the vehicle was registered; the four-digit numeric code is unique. For instance, the 2567th vehicle registered in the Ashanti Region in the year 2012 is AS 2567–12.

The four-digit numeric code is unique, to distinguish vehicles registered in the same region and year. The numbering starts from 1 and increases to 9999. For example, the first vehicle registered in the Central Region in the year 2009 bears the number plate CR 1-09 and the last vehicle in that year might bear the number plate CR 9999–09.

The two-letter region code is the combination of the first letter from the name of the region, and the letter 'R' which denotes region; however, four of the ten regions in Ghana: Ashanti, Brong-Ahafo, Upper East and Upper West do not have the letter 'R' as part of their region code.

Below are the codes for the various regions in Ghana;

AC, AE, AK, AP, AS, AW = Ashanti Region *

BA, BR, BW = Bono Region*

BT = Bono East Region

CR = Central Region

EN, ER, ES = Eastern Region

GB, GC, GE, GG, GH, GL, GM, GN, GT, GS, GW, GX, GY = Greater Accra Region

NR = Northern Region

UE = Upper East Region

UW = Upper West Region*

VA, VD, VR = Volta Region

WR, WT = Western Region

NB: Regions with asterisks are those that do not have the letter R as part of their region code.

Starting in 2020, additional abbreviations will be added.

"The Ghana Armed Forces, Ghana Police, Fire Service and the Ghana Prisons Service have special codes on their number plates - GA, GP, FS and PS, respectively. For example, "GP 5" would be a number plate for the Ghana Police.

=== Supplemental plates ===
In the Ashanti and Greater Accra Regions, many vehicles are registered every year so, the Driver Vehicle License Authority (DVLA, responsible for vehicle registration in Ghana) provides supplementary plates for these two regions - AW and AE are for Ashanti Region; GT, GN, GS, GC, GW, GE, GX, GL, GM, GY are for the Greater Accra Region.

FZB is issued as a special identification by Ghana Free Zone Board.

== Types ==
Several types of vehicle registration plates are available in Ghana: black on white background (for private vehicles), black on yellow (for commercial vehicles), green on white (for agricultural equipment such as tractor), white on red (for diplomats), and white on blue (for motorcycles).

=== Vehicles with special mark ===
The DVLA refers to vehicles with personalised or customised plates as Vehicles with Special Mark. It costs GH¢21,994.50 ($1333) to get a personalized plate.

=== Government plates ===
The number plate for government vehicles originated in January 6, 2014 when a vehicle re-registration exercise for government vehicles was started by the Ministry of Road and Transport. A statement signed by Transport Minister Dziva Aku Attivor reads "This is to ensure a judicious application of Government expenditure specifically on the utilization of government vehicles in Ghana as part of Government desire to prudently manage public resources."

== Gallery ==
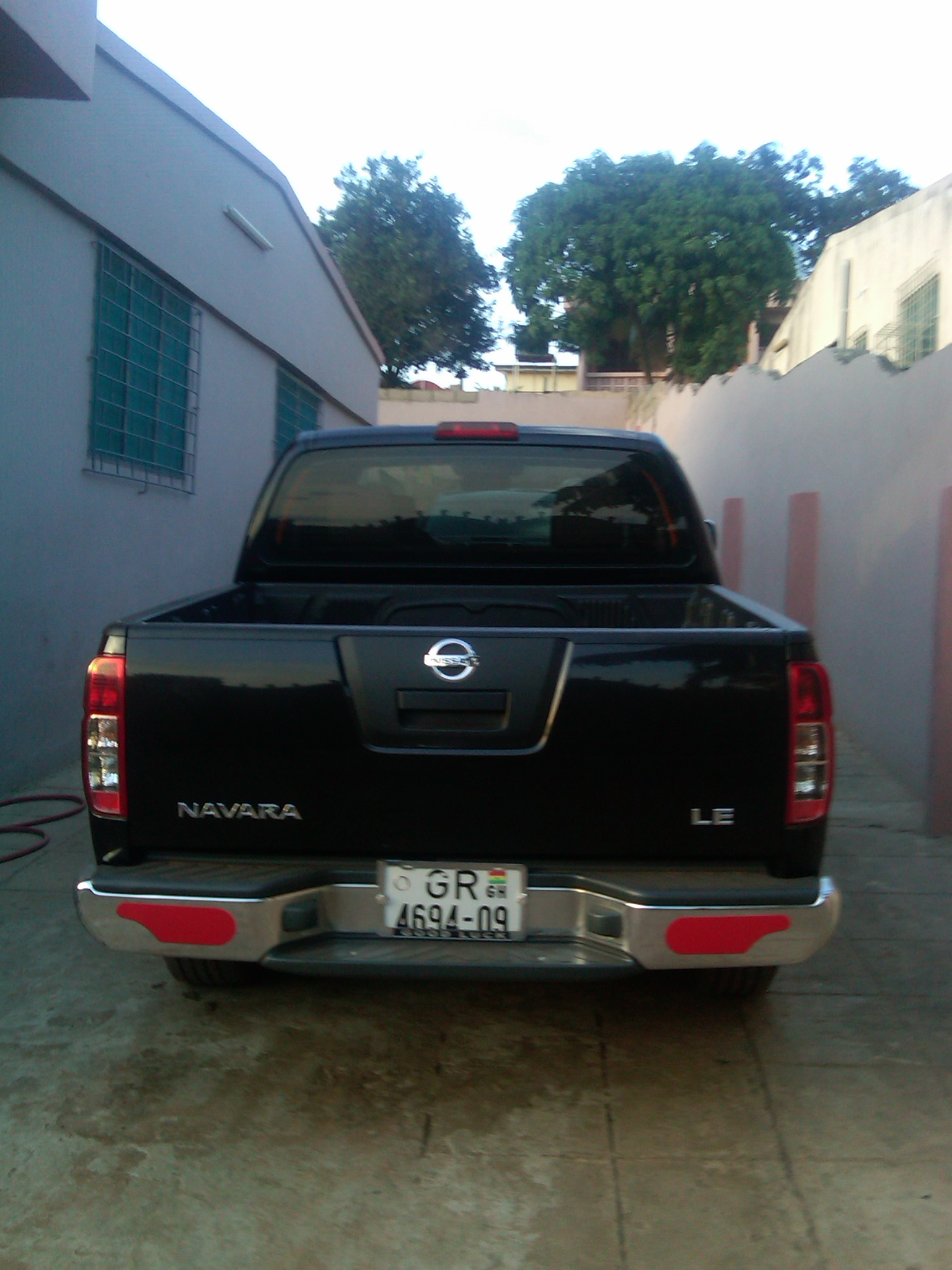
Number plate for a vehicle registered in the Greater Accra Region.

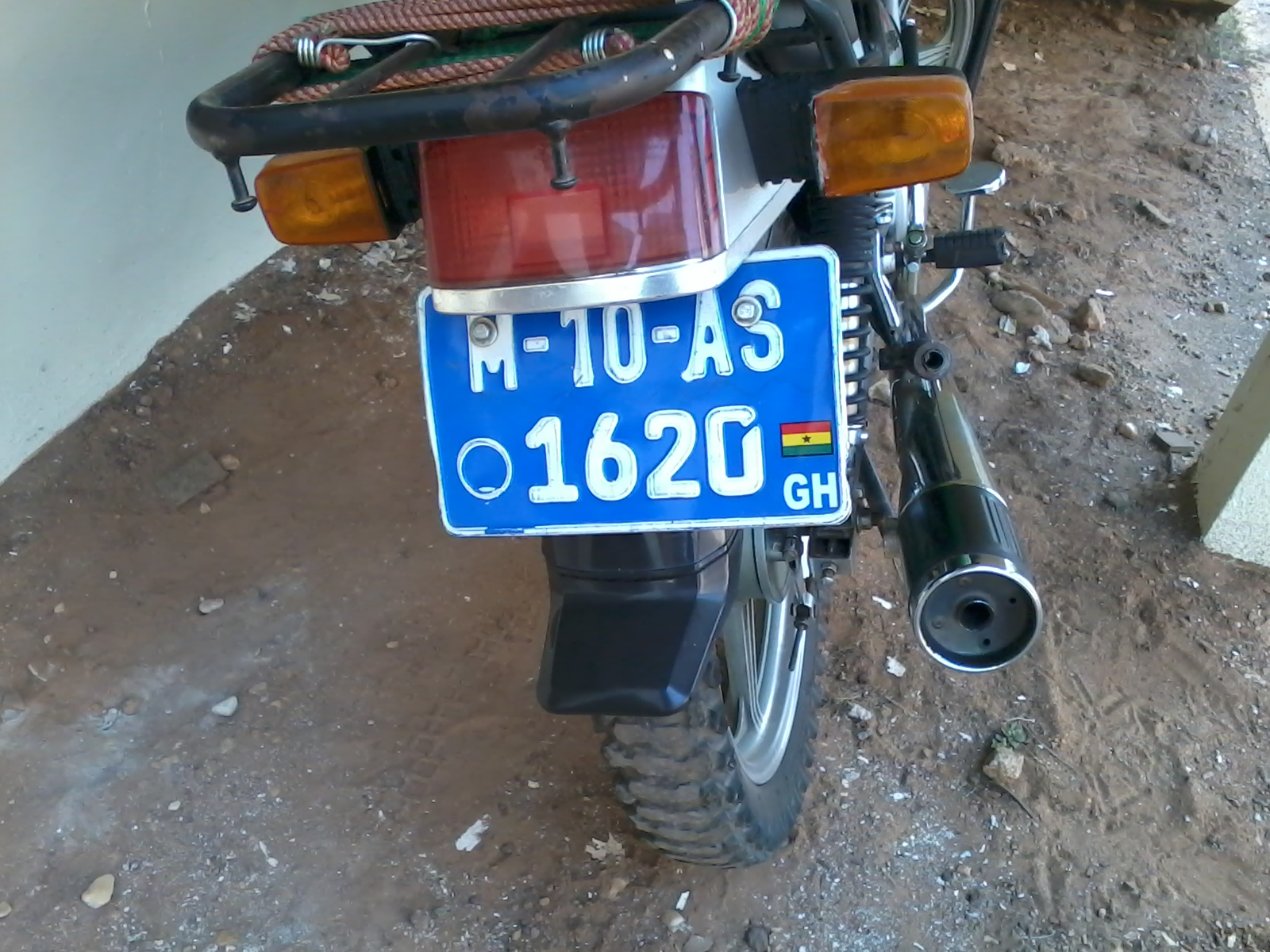
Motorcycle number plate for a vehicle registered in the Ashanti Region.

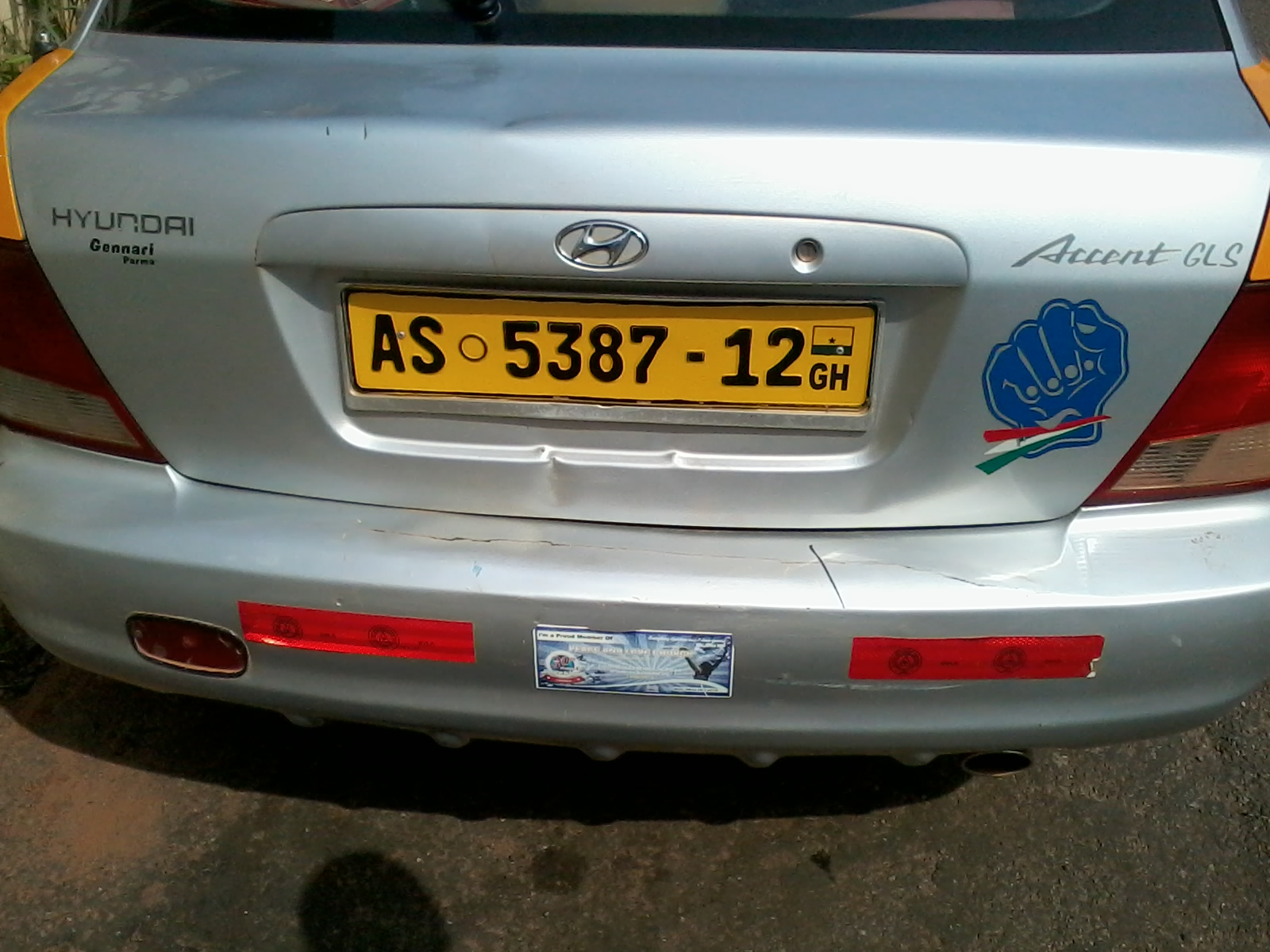
Number plate for a vehicle registered in the Ashanti Region.

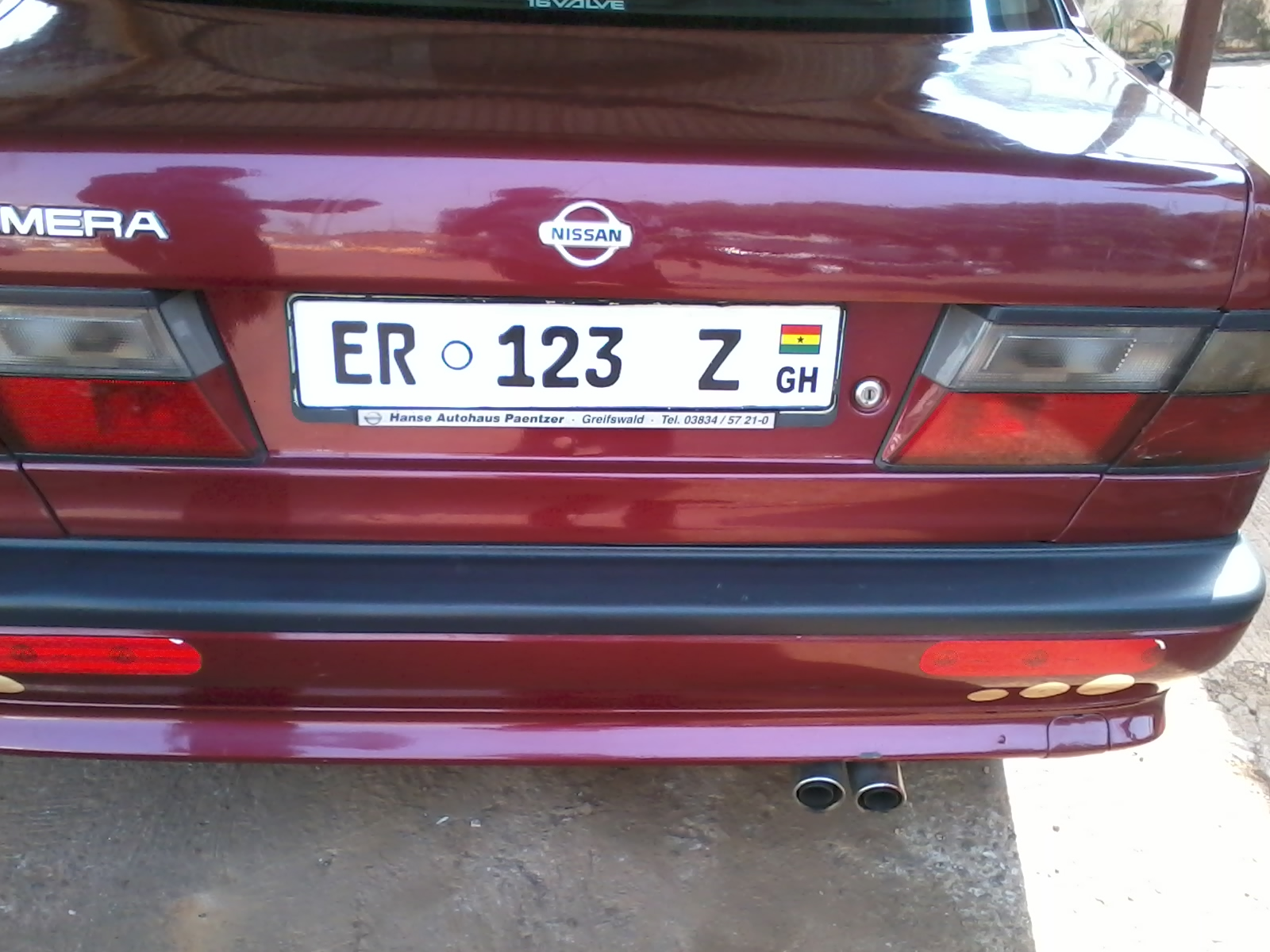
Number plate for a vehicle registered in the Eastern Region.

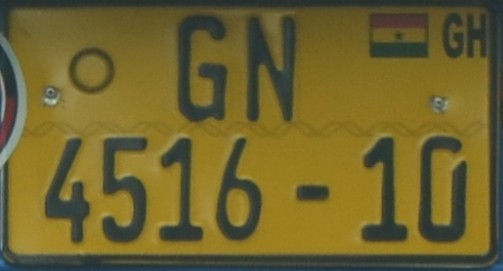
Older style commercial license plate.

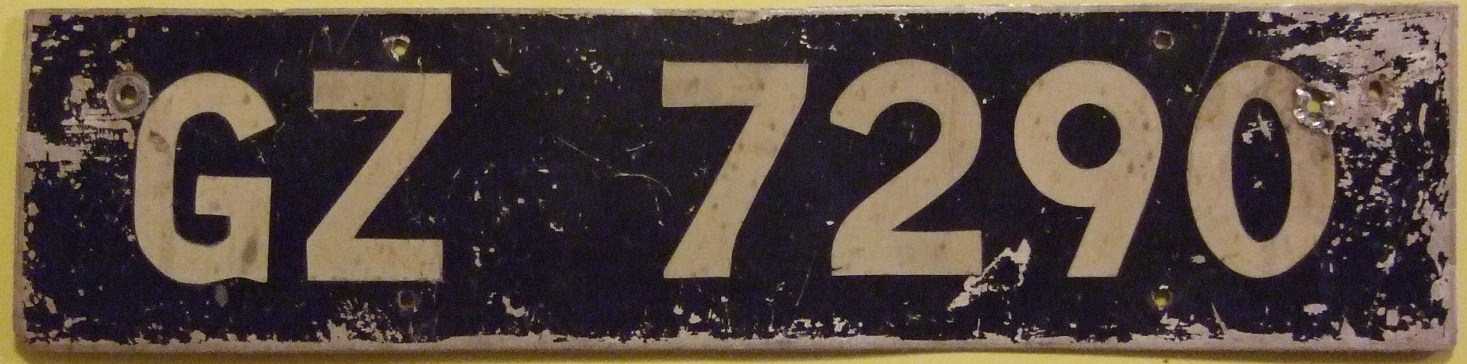
Ghana license plate from the 1980s.
