= Afringi Festival =

Festival in Ghana by the people of Yeji

Afringi Festival is an annual festival celebrated by the chiefs and peoples of Yeji Traditional Area in the Bono East Region, formerly the Brong Ahafo region of Ghana. It is usually celebrated by the decision of the ancestors.

== Celebrations ==
During the festival, visitors are welcomed to share food and drinks. The people put on traditional clothes and there is durbar of chiefs. There is also dancing and drumming.

== Significance ==
This festival is celebrated to mark an event that took place in the past. This festival unites the people. It serves as a period of assessing activities of the outgoing year and also ushers in new developmental projects.
