= Nkyifie Festival =

Festival in Ghana by the people of Prang

Nkyifie (Yam) Festival is an annual festival celebrated by the chiefs and people of Prang Traditional Area in the Pru West District in the Bono East Region, formerly the Brong Ahafo region of Ghana. It is usually celebrated in the month of September. Others also claim it is celebrated in October or December. Others also claim it is celebrated in November.

== Celebrations ==
During the festival, visitors are welcomed to share food and drinks. The people put on traditional clothes and there is durbar of chiefs. There is also dancing and drumming.

== Significance ==
This festival is celebrated to mark an event that took place in the past. The people of Prang use this festival to reappraise their overall performance for the year.
