= Agyina =

Community in Bono East Region, Ghana

Coordinates: 7°48′N 1°55′W

Agyina is a community in the Kintampo South District of the Bono East Region of Ghana. It has a high immigrant population from Northern Ghana and is noted for its large scale farming activities. Languages spoken in this community are mainly Asante twi and Dagbanli.
