= Paul Yeboah =

Ghanaian permaculturist

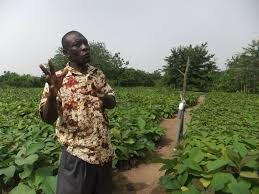
- Born: September 22, 1970
- Died: September 14, 2021 (aged 50)
- Education: Diploma in Tropical Agriculture and Permaculture Design Certificate
- Occupations: Agro_farmer and Sustainable Development Community Educator
- Spouse: Agnes Ameyaa
- Children: Four children

Paul Yeboah (1970 – 2021) was an educator, farmer, permaculturist, community developer, and social entrepreneur. Yeboah founded and coordinated the Ghana Permaculture Institute and Network in Techiman, Ghana, West Africa. It is located in the Brong-Ahafo Region of Ghana. The purpose of the Institute is to build and maintain a stable food system, to take care of the local ecosystems, and to improve the quality of life in the rural areas. The GPN trains students and community in sustainable ecological farming techniques. They support projects throughout Ghana; women groups, micro-finance projects; teach growing moringa; mushroom production; alley cropping, food forests development and Agroforestry.

Permaculture is based on natural sustainable design systems. An agricultural system that uses practices to keep soil fertile, crops and livestock healthy. It encourages protection of the environment and an environmental lifestyle; so as to maintain environmental stability and maintain environmental resources for the future. It rehabilitates eroded and deforested land. The Permaculture Network encourages the practice of permaculture at home. The Permaculture Network's mission is to encourage, educate, and promote the use of permaculture by farmers and people in Ghana, which will contribute to the environmental soundness, and stability of the country's future.

They host international volunteers, interns, and students. The Ghana Permaculture Network and Institute is a member of the Ghana Ecovillage Network. Which is an organization of sustainable development leaders and projects. Paul Yeboah is Vice President of the GEN which works towards promoting Indigenous Initiatives and Sustainability in Ghana. Permaculture is transforming communities in Ghana through education, food production, outreach, skills development, self-sufficiency, and creating small business enterprises.

== Background ==
At the age of 22 Paul Yeboah was concerned with rural and urban poverty. He received an Agricultural Certificate from the Farm Institute in Ghana. He initiated a rural and urban fruit forest project by using seed supplies from the Kade Oil Palm Research Institute and Bonsu Cocoa Research Station. The seeds and seedlings were given to the farmers on a credit basis. This project was instrumental in the creation of rural processing businesses and employment for the poor.

In 2003 Paul Yeboah was the farm manager for the Abbott of Kristo Buase Benedictine Monastery in Ghana. Greg Knibbs was invited to come to the Monastery to assist in the redesigning of the farm using Permaculture practices to restore the soil to fertility. The soil was depleted from the use of synthetic chemical pollution. Yeboah met Greg Knibbs and they worked together to form the Ghana Permaculture Network which later became the Ghana Permaculture Institute.

== Career ==
The Ghana Permaculture Network was coordinated by Paul Yeboah in 2003. The GPN started out as a small farm demonstration training site that later grew into the Ghana Permaculture Institute (GPI). In 2007 the Ghana Permaculture Nwodua Tree Nursery was created. It was created to build community income, and to deal with environmental issues such as desertification and erosion. It also does reforestation. The work is collaborative community effort involving women, youth, and men. All members of the community are a part of the profits and benefits of working towards enhancing their environment. The project builds environmental awareness.

Paul Yeboah is the Vice Chairman of the Ghana Ecovillage Network which was founded in 2012, and incorporated in 2013. It was formed by community leaders and groups with sustainable projects to promote Ecovillage strategies as models for sustainable development in Ghana.

The Ghana Permaculture Network started out supporting local schools, community farmers in establishing tree nurseries, and tree planting projects. The Ghana Permaculture Network has now expanded in various parts of Ghana, into Togo, and Burkina Faso in West Africa.

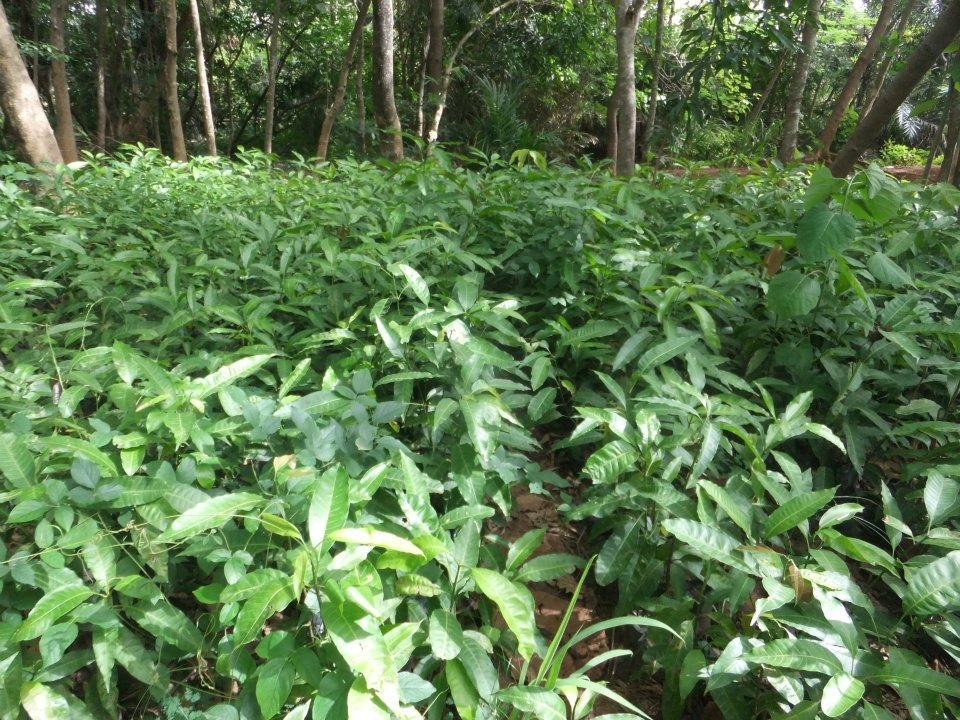
A photograph of Tree Nursery in Techiman, Ghana.

== Permaculture Institute Projects (Educational Programs) ==
The goal of the educational initiatives and projects is to promote lifelong learning with emphases on vocational training, and the need of viable skill development using practices of sustainable development.

- Permaculture Design Courses are taught in Ghana, Togo and Burkina Faso, West Africa.
- Ghana Permaculture Nwodua Tree Nursery Project - Ghana is a deforested country. The Tree Nursery Project addresses issues of deforestation in order to reverse erosion. It teaches and advocates the importance of trees and climate change issues.
- Oyster mushroom production - Using sawdust in bags the Permaculture Institute teaches how to grow mushrooms. This project allows participants to learn how to make a waste product sawdust useful. Which promotes healthy diet, nutrition and skill development.
- Demonstration Training sites for how-to build Permaculture home gardens
- Moringa Production - Which helps to facilitate the development of small-businesses to generate income. A project that promotes healthy nutrition and skills development.
- Ecovillage Design Course - Which teaches and acquaints students with tools that can be utilized to redevelop their communities in ecological economically, culturally and socially ways to foster sustainability.

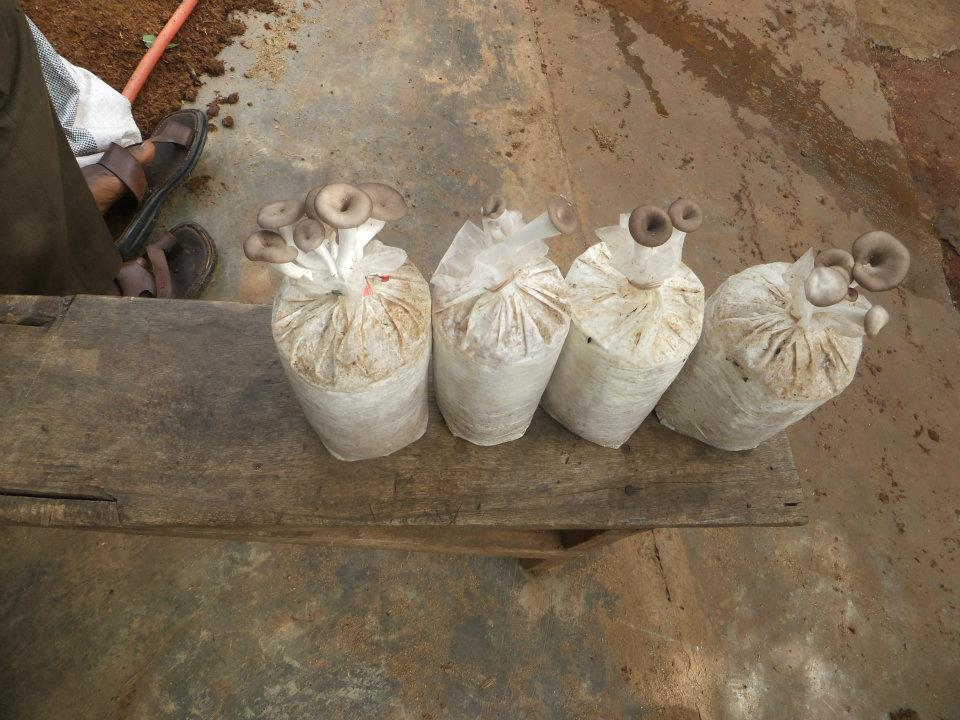
Ghana Permaculture Network - Mushroom Production

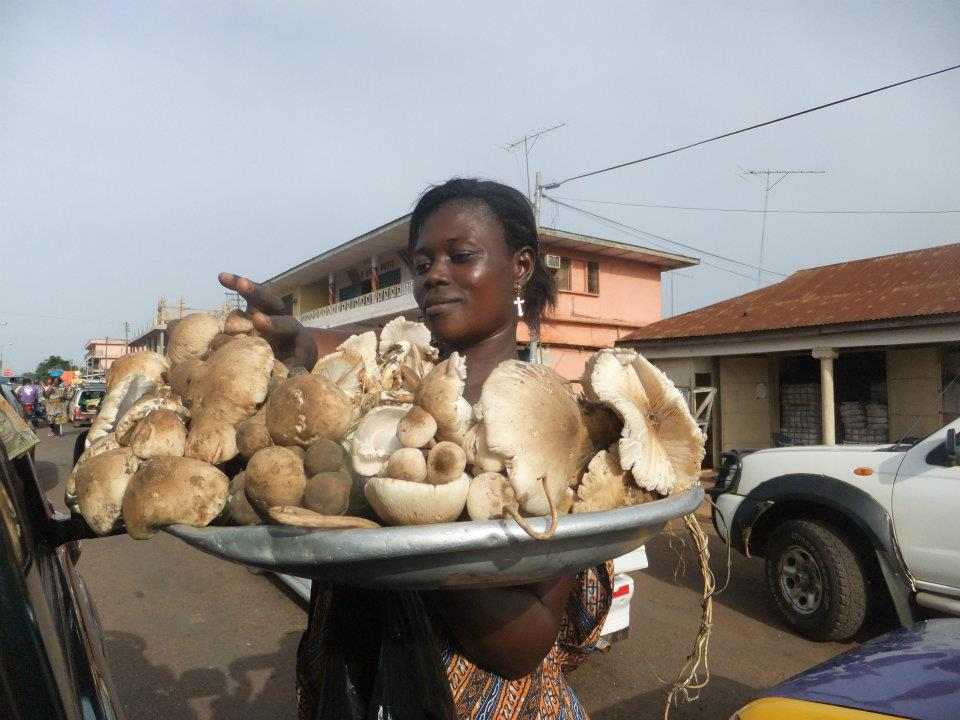
Mushroom Vendor, Ghana
