= Yeji, Ghana =

Town in Bono East Region, Ghana

Yeji
- Town
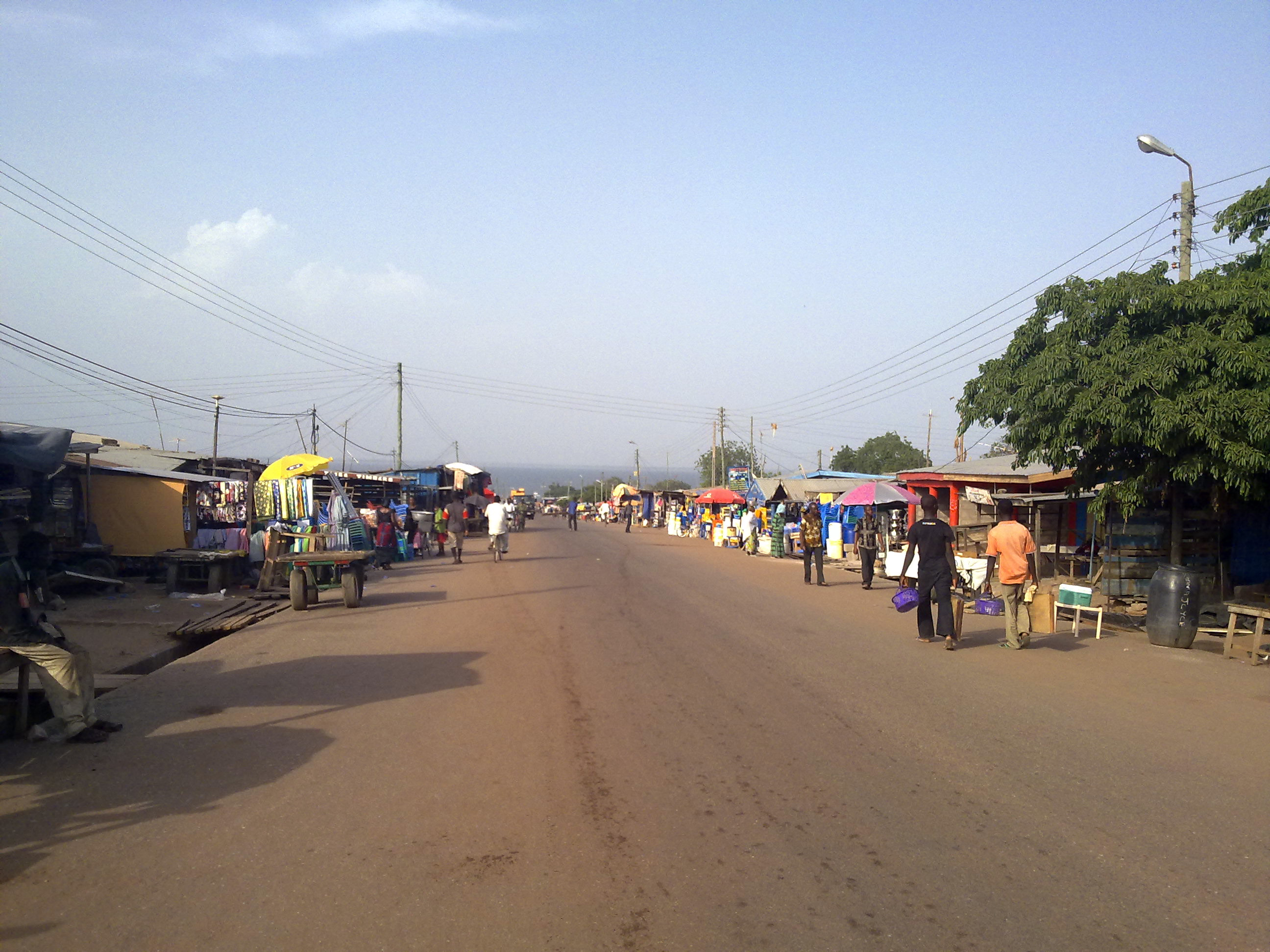
- View of main street in Yeji. In the background is Lake Volta.

- Location of Yeji in Bono East Region, Ghana
- Coordinates: 8°13′N 0°39′W
- Country: Ghana
- Region: Bono East Region
- District: Pru East District
- Elevation: 107 m (351 ft)
- Time zone: GMT
  - Summer (DST): GMT

Yeji is a town in the centre of Ghana and the capital of the Pru East District of the Bono East Region in Ghana. Yeji is adjacent to Lake Volta. Yeji is connected by highway to Ejura and Kwadjokrom. It had a population of 29,515 at the census of 2010.

Yeji and its surroundings form the homeland of a branch of the Chumburu people, who also have a traditional area in the kingdom of Chumburung, at the other side of Lake Volta. They speak the Chumburung language, but the Yeji dialect is quite different from the one spoken in Chumburung itself. Apart from the Chumburu, Konkombas, Gonjas and others are also native in Yeji.

== See also ==
- Afringi Festival
