= Buoyem =

Coordinates: 7°40′N 1°58′W

- Interactive map of Buoyem
- Country: Ghana
- Region: Bono East Region

Buoyem is a town in the Bono East region of Ghana. The town is known for the Buoyem High School. The school is a second cycle institution.
