= Nkoranza =

Town in Bono East Region, Ghana

Coordinates: 07°34′00″N 01°42′00″W

- Town
- Location of Nkoranza in Bono East Region
- Country: Ghana
- Region: Bono East Region
- District: Nkoranza District

Population
  - Total: —
- Time zone: GMT
  - Summer (DST): GMT

Nkoranza (or Nkoransa) is a town located in the mid-north of Ghana. It is the district capital of the Nkoranza District in the Bono East Region.

A leading Brong town, the town led the 1892-93 Brong rebellion against the Ashanti. Nkoranza is a town located in the newly created Bono East Region, from the Former Mother Region Brong Ahafo, which use to Host the now Ahafo Region and the current Bono East Region. Nkoranza is now in the Bono East Region whose capital is Techiman. It is divided into two districts: Nkoranza North and Nkoranza south district. Nkoranza has a market at which mainly yams, maize, and other foodstuffs are sold.

== Nkoranza South District ==
Nkoranza south is among the twenty-seven(27) administrative districts in the Brong Ahafo Region of Ghana. It is found in the center of the Brong Ahafo Region. It shares boundary with Nkoranza North District to the north. It consists of 126 settlements headed by one paramount chief.

== Nkoranza North District ==
Nkoranza north district is one of the twenty-seven (27) administrative districts in the Brong Ahafo Region. It has Busunya as its capital. It shares boundaries with Kintampo South to the south and Nkoranza South to the north

== Transport ==
Nkoranza is the location of a proposed railway station.

== Education ==
- St. Theresa Roman Catholic School
- Nkoranza Senior High Technical School
- Anglican University College

== See also ==
- Railway stations in Ghana
- Nkoranza shooting
