= 2018 Ghanaian new regions referendum =

Referendum in Ghana

A referendum on creating new regions was held in Ghana on 27 December 2018. Voting took place in the 47 districts that would potentially become part of new regions which would be created by splitting four of the existing regions. The proposed splits were:

- Northern split into Northern, North East and Savannah;
- Volta split into Volta and Oti;
- Western split into Western and Western North;
- Brong-Ahafo split into Bono, Ahafo and Bono East.

All proposed new regions were approved, with 'yes' votes above 99% in all regions and turnouts ranging from 80% to 90%.
