= Tanoboase Sacred Grove and Shrine =

Tourist site in Ghana

- Location within Ghana
- 7.66286°N 1.85693°W
- Location: Techiman, Brong Ahafo region, Ghana

Tanoboase Sacred Grove and Shrine is near the village of Tanoboase in the Techiman, Brong Ahafo region of Ghana. It is believed to be the cradle and the traditional home of the Bono people. It is said by the Tanoboase people that powerful Ashanti Gods reside in the sacred grove. Historically the site is where Ashanti Wars were fought. The grove was a hideout during the slave trade and inter-tribal wars. The grove is also a place for religious activities.

== History ==
Tano is the name given to several gods. The word Tano has its origins in the Tano River.

The Tano sacred grove and shrine is one of many sacred groves in Ghana, West Africa. The rock shrine is inside of the sacred grove. Inside the rock shrine is the original brass pan. There are five compartments, the main entrance, durbar ground, hideout, watch tower and stairs.

It is an oasis that maintains biodiversity in culture and religious based knowledge system. Mike Anane writes, "It is gratifying that in Ghana today, some NGOs and scholars are recognizing the importance of various traditional religious beliefs or culture-based knowledge systems in addressing alarming problems of environment and development ... The old 'top-down' or paternalistic forms of development can no longer be enough in the face of environmental catastrophe."

In 1996, the Grove became a Community Based-Ecotourism Project (CBEP).

The Tanoboase Sacred Grove and Shrine is part of Ghana's material cultural heritage.

In 2001, the Sacred grove was selected to be an eco-tourism site with the support of the Ghana Association for the Conservation of Nature (GACON).

== Beliefs and practices ==
The Tano sacred grove and rock shrine is a traditional conservation practice bedded in indigenous religion of the Bono people of Ghana. The sacred grove is believed by the Bono people to be the abode of local gods, and ancestral spirits. It is also the home of super natural beings.

Oral tradition is passed down from generation to generation about the founding of the sacred grove. Legend is that the deity Taakora manifested to Afya Ankomah with instructions to follow. The instructions enabled the Bono people to live in the rock caves. The instructions were that the people were not to hunt or farm in the sacred grove. The caves were shelter. They gave the Bonos security and were used as hideouts for kings.

== Gallery ==
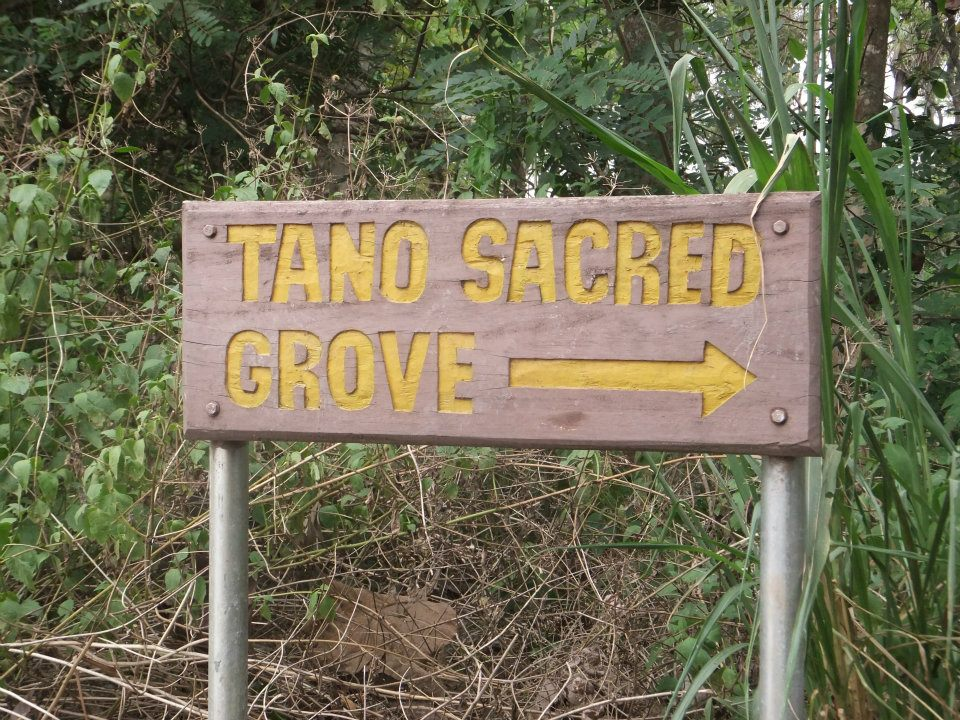
Sacred Grove and Shrine

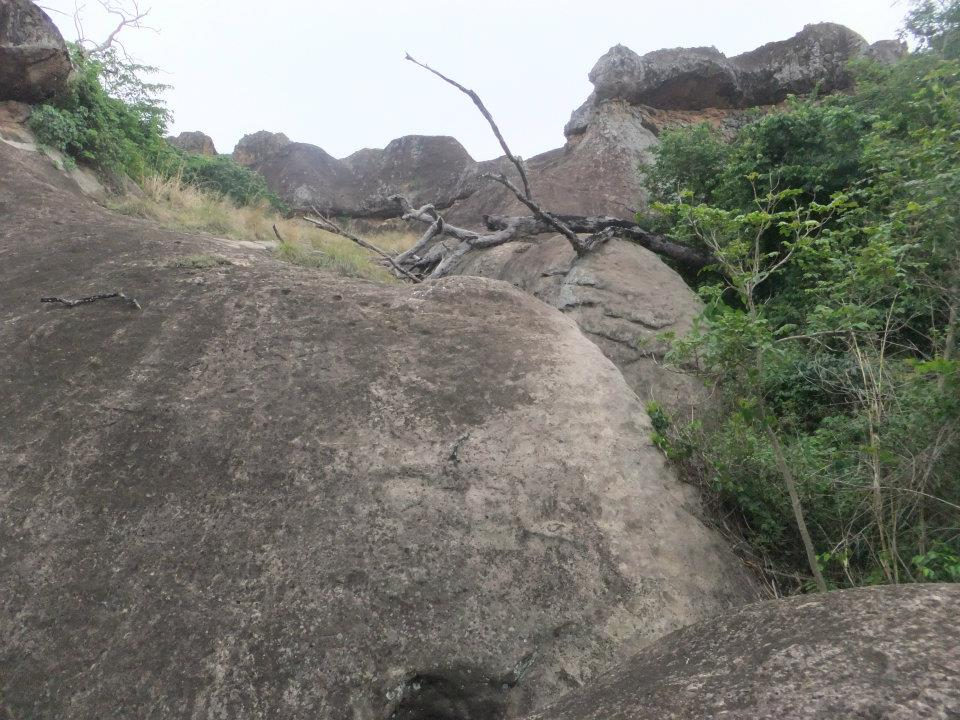
Tano Rock Shrine in Tanoboase, Ghana

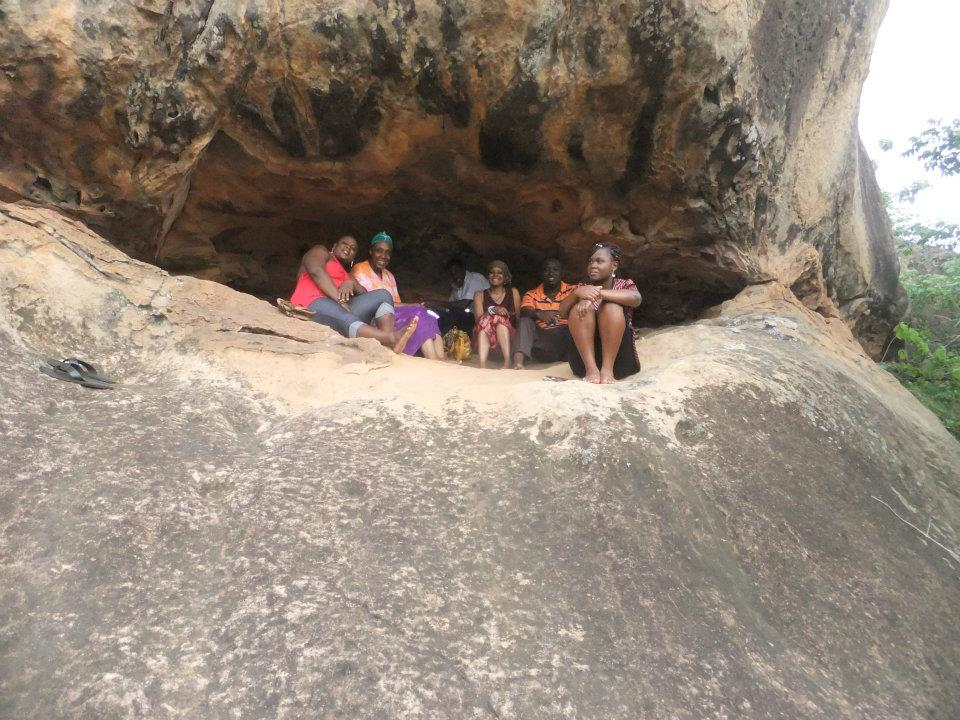
Tano Rock Shrine located in Tanoboase, Ghana

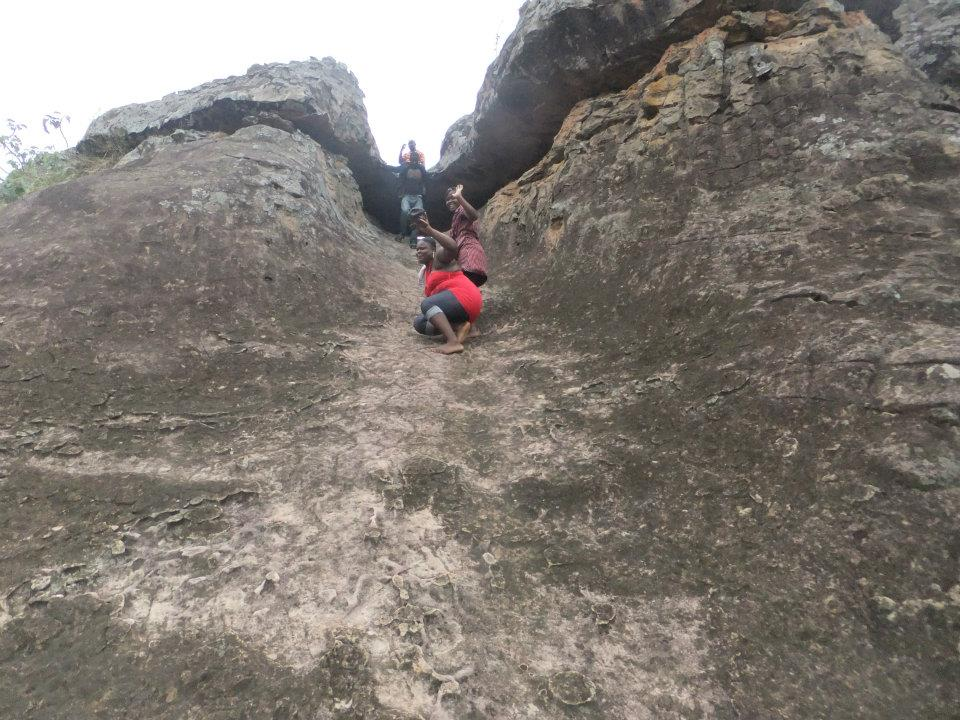
Located in Tanoboase, Ghana

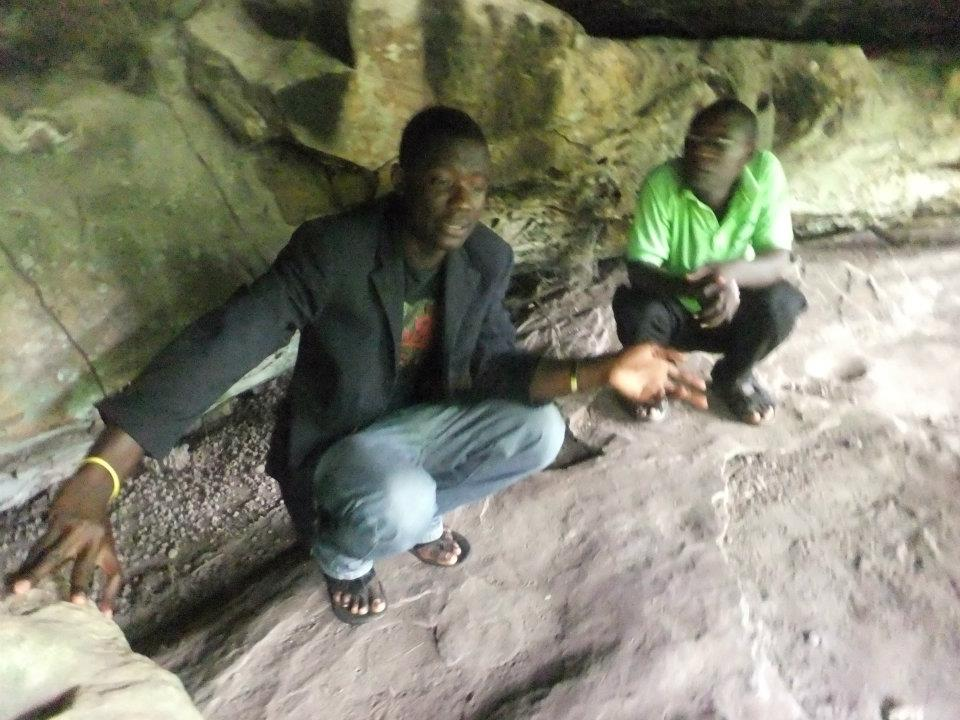
Inside the Tano Rock Shrine with tour guide in Tanoboase, Ghana
