= Boabeng-Fiema Monkey Sanctuary =

Monkey sanctuary in Bono East Region, Ghana

Boabeng-Fiema Monkey Sanctuary Boabeng-Fiema Monkey Wildlife Sanctuary
- Village
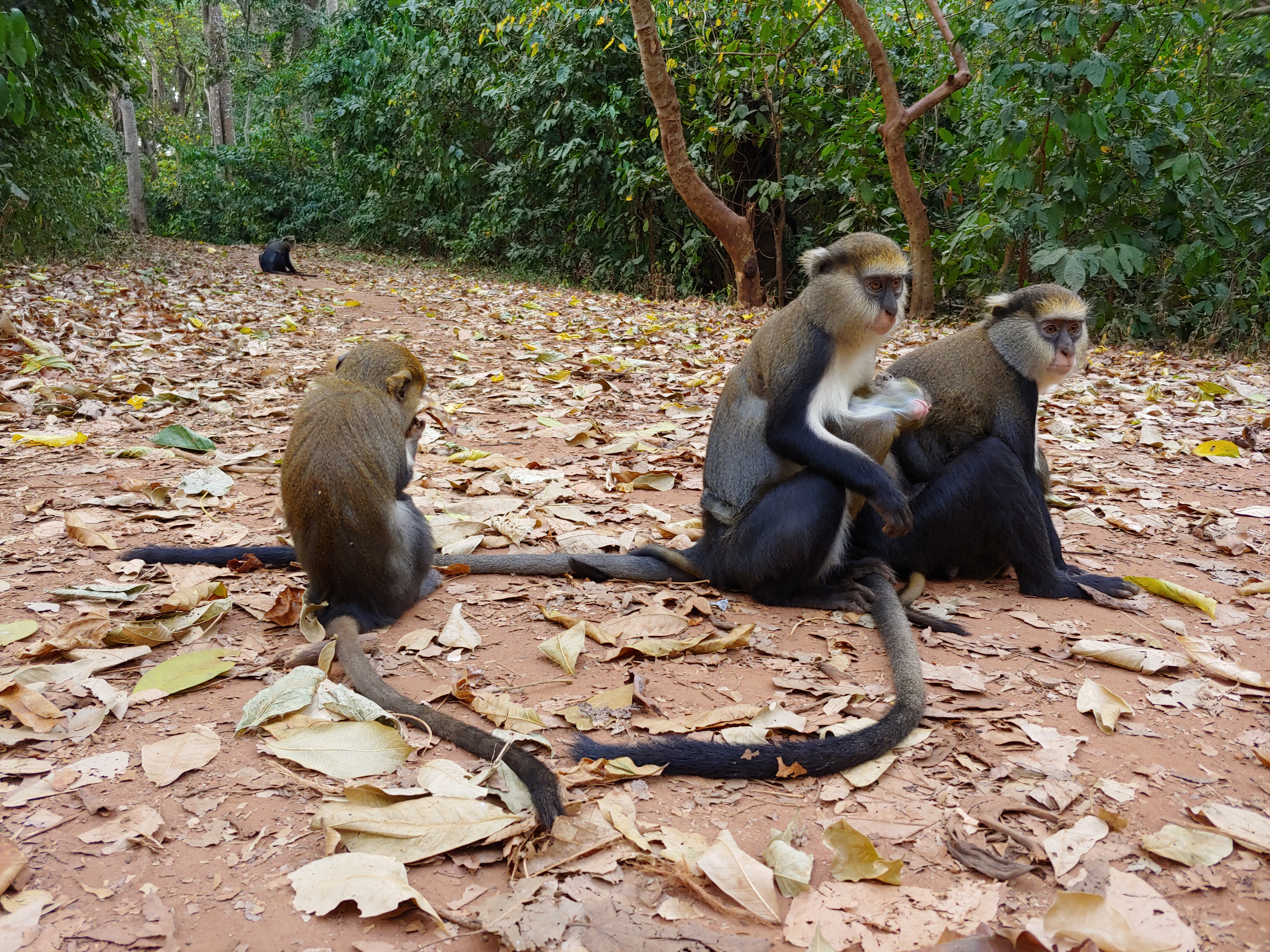

- Location in Ghana
- Coordinates: 7°43′08″N 1°43′25″W
- Country: Ghana
- Region: Bono East Region
- District: Nkoranza North District
- Elevation: 366 m (1,201 ft)

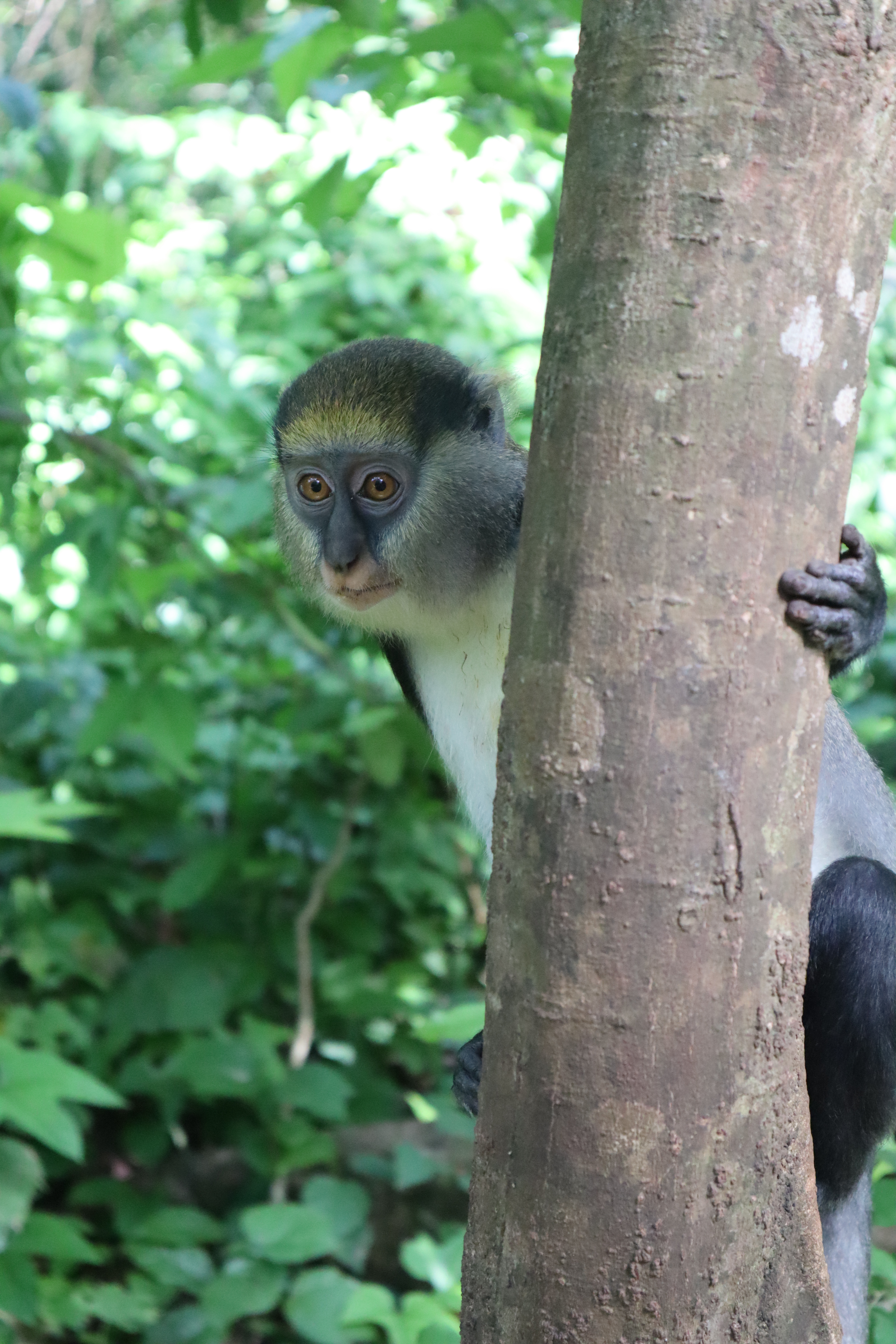
Boabeng-Fiema Monkey Sanctuary

The Boabeng-Fiema Monkey Wildlife Sanctuary is found at Boaben and Fiema, twin communities 22 kilometers away from the Nkoranza North District of the Bono East region, Ghana. The 4.4 kilometer square (km^{2}) forest, believed to have been created in the 1970s, houses many trees, birds, reptiles, deer and monkeys. It is also a home for about 700 monkeys, including Campbell mona monkey and the critically endangered Geoffrey's pied colobus. The village is a community where monkeys and human beings live together. Some inhabitants in the village leave food out for the animals, though the sanctuary discourages this practice, as it leads to conflicts with monkeys over foods.

The monkeys in the sanctuary are protected by the traditional laws on the area. For generations, the village people of Boabeng and Fiema have believed that the local monkeys are sacred and have prohibited harm to them. When a monkey dies, it is buried in a coffin and special funeral rites are performed.

The sanctuary serves as a national tourist site and is accessible by road.
