= Kintampo South District =

District in Bono East Region, Ghana

- District
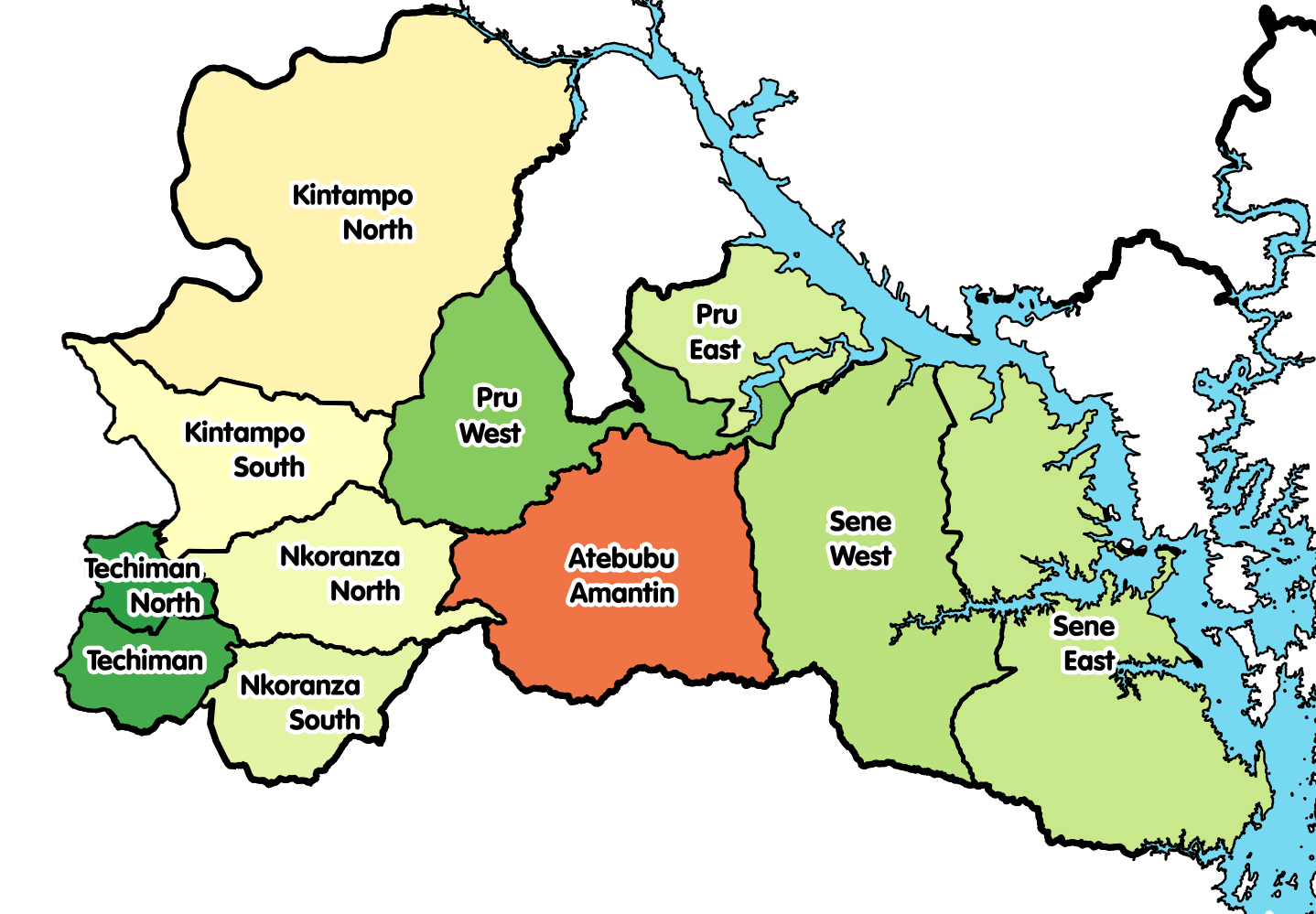
- Districts of Bono East Region

- Location of Kintampo South District within Bono East Region
- Coordinates: 7°53′52.8″N 1°46′15.6″W
- Country: Ghana
- Region: Bono East Region
- Capital: Jema

Government
  - District Executive: Kojo Nyame Datiakwa

Area
  - Total: 1,510 km^{2} (580 sq mi)

Population (2021)
  - Total: 89,126
  - Density: 59.0/km^{2} (153/sq mi)
- Time zone: UTC+0 (GMT)

Kintampo South District is one of the eleven districts in Bono East Region, Ghana. Originally it was formerly part of the then-larger Kintampo District on 10 March 1989, until the southern part of the district was split off to create Kintampo South District on 12 November 2003 (effectively 17 February 2004); thus the remaining part has been renamed as Kintampo North District; which it was later elevated to municipal district assembly status on 1 November 2007 (effectively 29 February 2008) to become Kintampo North Municipal District. The district assembly is located in the northern part of Bono East Region and has Jema as its capital town.

== List of settlements ==
Settlements of Kintampo South District
No.	Settlement	Population	Population year
1	Agyina (Ajina)		
2	Amoma		
3	Ampoma		
4	Anyima		
5	Apesika		
6	Chirehin		
7	Jema		
8	Krabonso		
9	Nante		
10	Ntankoro		
11	Pramposo		

== Sources ==
- "Kintampo South District". Statoids.
- District: Kintampo South District
- 19 New Districts Created , November 20, 2003.
