= Nkoranza South Municipal District =

- Municipal District
- Nickname: NKZ
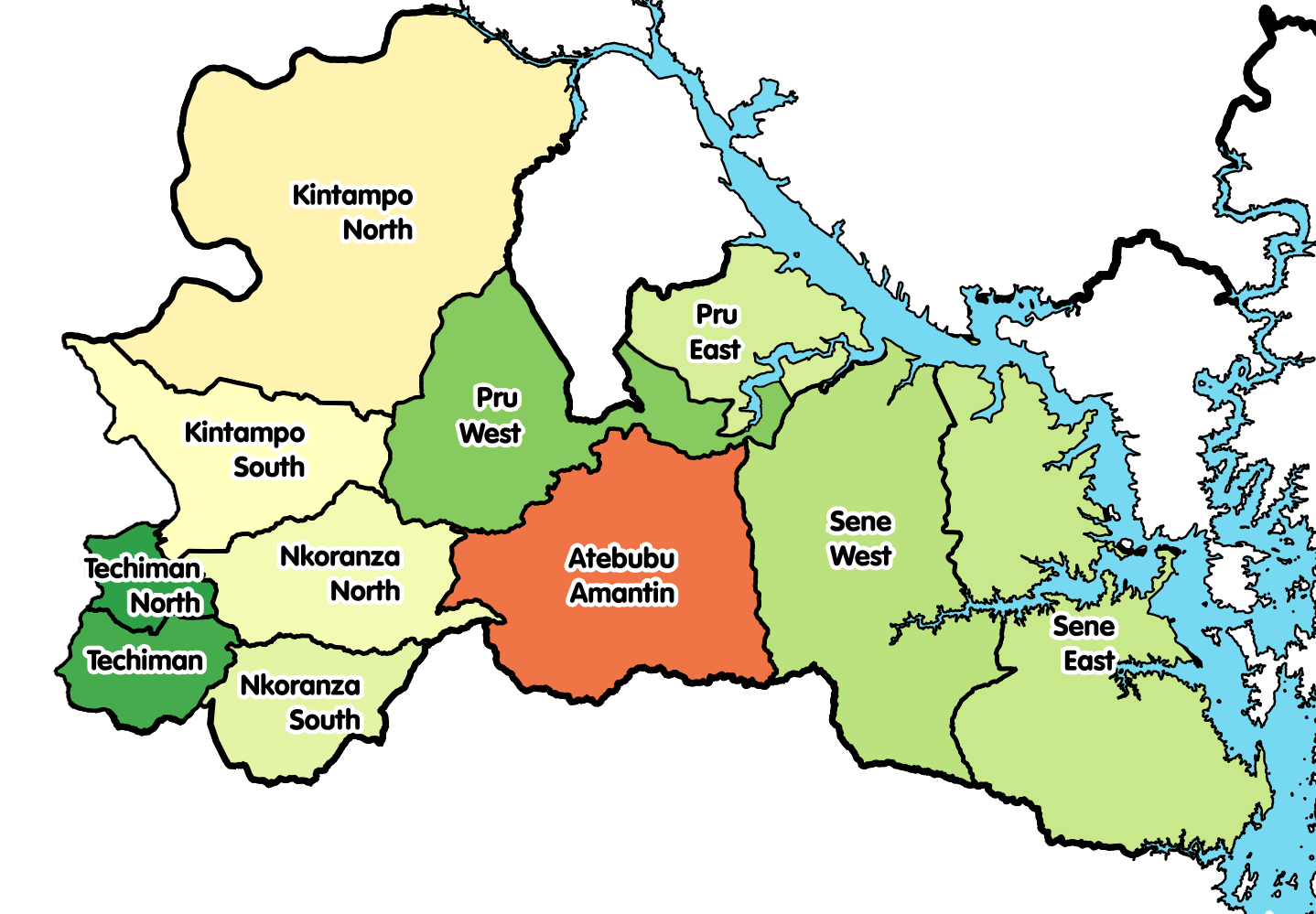
- Districts of Bono East Region

- Location of Nkoranza South Municipal District within Bono East Region
- Coordinates: 7°34′8.4″N 1°42′7.2″W
- Country: Ghana
- Region: Bono East Region
- Capital: Nkoranza

Government
  - Municipal Chief Executive: Emmanuel Kwadwo Agyekum; Mada Attaa Kissiwaa

Population (2021)
  - Total: 114,642
- Time zone: UTC+0 (GMT)

Nkoranza South Municipal District is one of the eleven districts in Bono East Region, Ghana. Originally it was formerly part of the then-larger Nkoranza District on 10 March 1989, until the northern part of the district was split off to create Nkoranza North District on 1 November 2007 (effectively 29 February 2008); thus the remaining part has been renamed as Nkoranza South District, which it was later elevated to municipal district assembly status on 28 June 2012 to become Nkoranza South Municipal District. The municipality is located in the southern part of Bono East Region and has Nkoranza as its capital town.

== List of settlements ==
Settlements of Nkoranza South Municipal District
No.	Settlement	Population	Population year
1	Ahyiaem		
2	Akuma		
3	Akumsa-Adumase		
4	Ayerede		
'5	Akropon		
6	Bonsu		
7	Breman		
8	Brahoho		
9	Bredi		
10	Dandwa		
11	Donkro Nkwanta		
12	Dotobaa		
13	Guramakurom		
14	Dasagwa		
15	Camp		
16	Nkoranza		
17	Nkwabeng		
18	Baanofour		
19	Akropong		
20	Aboantem		
21	Brahoho		
22	Kentenkeni		
23	Piayina		
24	Makyimabere		

== Sources ==
- "Nkoranza South Municipal District". Statoids.
- Municipal: Nkoranza South Municipal District
