= Nkoranza North District =

District in Bono East Region, Ghana

Nkoranza South District
- District
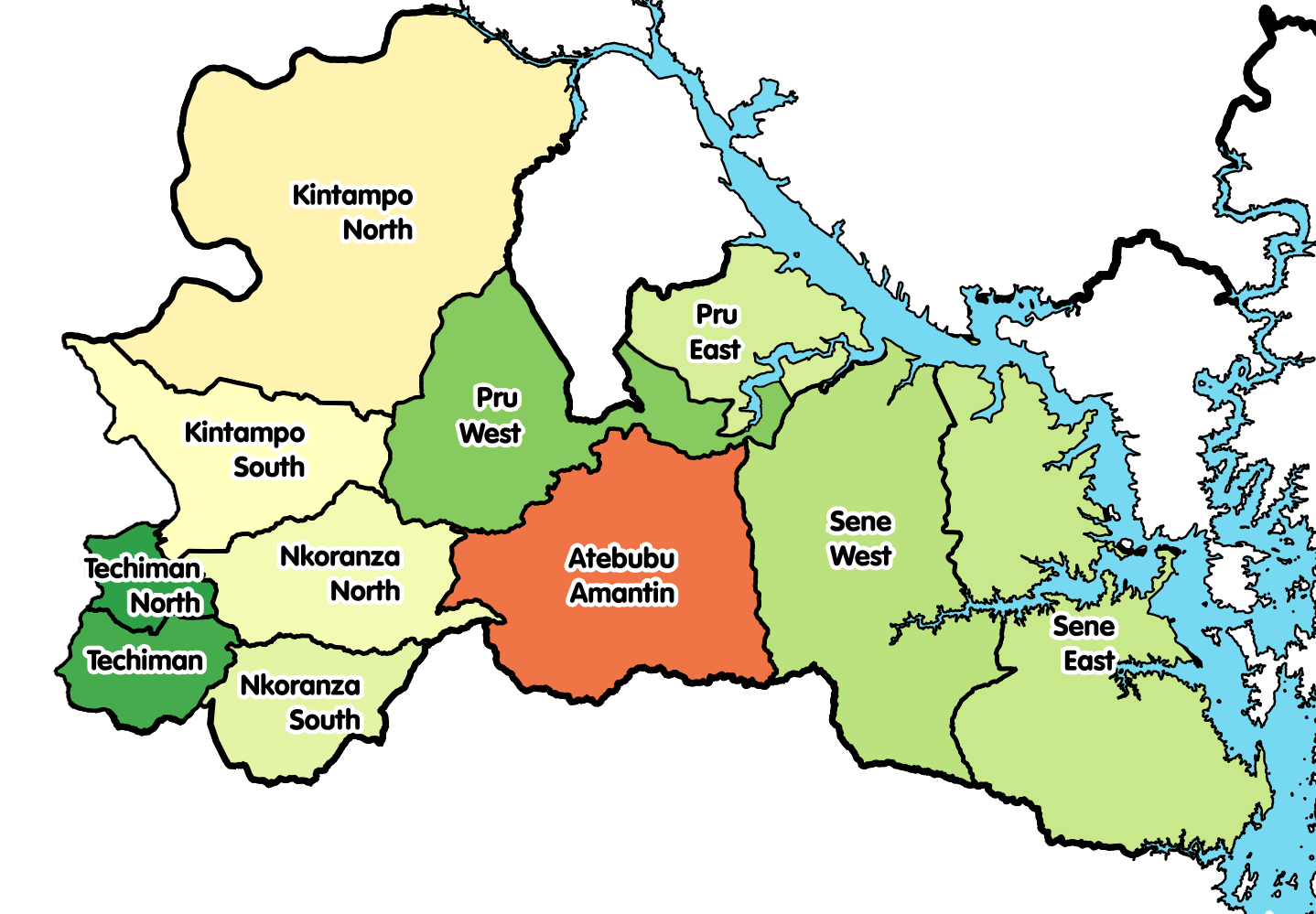
- Districts of Bono East Region

- Location of Nkoranza South District within Bono East Region
- Coordinates: 7°41′N 1°40′W
- Country: Ghana
- Region: Bono East Region
- Capital: Busunya

Government
  - District Executive: Kwadwo Adjei Dwemoh

Area
  - Total: 1,394 km^{2} (538 sq mi)

Population (2021)
  - Total: 56,468
  - Density: 40.51/km^{2} (104.9/sq mi)
- Time zone: UTC+0 (GMT)

Nkoranza North District is one of the eleven districts in Bono East Region, Ghana. Originally it was formerly part of the then-larger Nkoranza District on 10 March 1989, until the northern part of the district was split off to create Nkoranza North District on 1 November 2007 (effectively 29 February 2008); thus the remaining part has been renamed as Nkoranza South District; which it was later elevated to municipal district assembly status on 28 June 2012 to become Nkoranza South Municipal District. The district assembly is located in the southern part of Bono East Region and has Busunya as its capital town.

== List of settlements ==
Settlements of Nkoranza North District
No.	Settlement	Population	Population year
1	Busunya		
'2'	Akrudwa		

== Sources ==
- "Nkoranza North District". Statoids.
- District: Nkoranza North District
