= Digya National Park =

National park in Ghana

- Location within Ghana
- Location: Bono East Region of Ghana
- Coordinates: 7°25′N 0°17′W
- Area: 3,743 km^{2} (1,445 sq mi)
- Established: 1971

Digya National Park is the second largest national park and the oldest protected area in Ghana. It is located in the Bono East Region.

== History ==
Digya National Park was created in 1900 as a protected area, the first in Ghana. It was acquired by the government and gazetted as a national park in 1971. When the government acquired the park, there were living settlements in the park, with most of the residents being fishermen and farmers. In 2006, there were 49 settlements and the government of Ghana began evicting settlement residents from the park. In early 2005, a patrol-based system was established in the park to curb illegal activity.

== Geography ==
Occupying an area of 3,743 km^{2} (1,445 sq mi), Digya is the second largest national park in Ghana. It is in the Bono East region and is bordered on the north, south, and east by Lake Volta. This park is the only wildlife territory in Ghana to border on Lake Volta, the largest man-made body of water in the world. Located on a lowland peninsula, it has an undulating terrain. It lies in a transitional zone between forest and savanna.

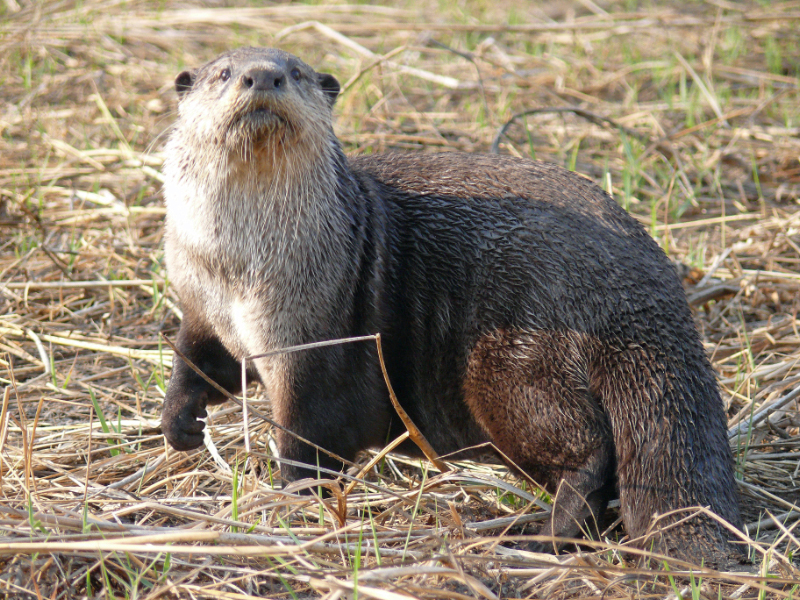
African clawless otter

=== Wildlife ===
The park is home to at least six primate species and elephants belonging to some of the less studied species in Africa. The elephant population in the park is the second largest in Ghana. Antelope species are also found in the park. There are also manatees and African clawless otters in the arms of Lake Volta that extend into Digya National Park. At least 236 species of birds live in the park, which has been designated an Important Bird Area (IBA) by BirdLife International because it supports significant populations of many bird species.
