= Techiman Municipal District =

Municipal Assembly in Brong-Ahafo, Ghana

- Municipal district
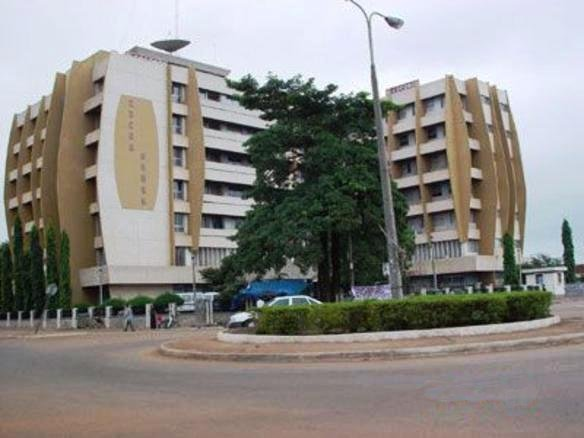
- The Sunyani Cocoa House

- Seal

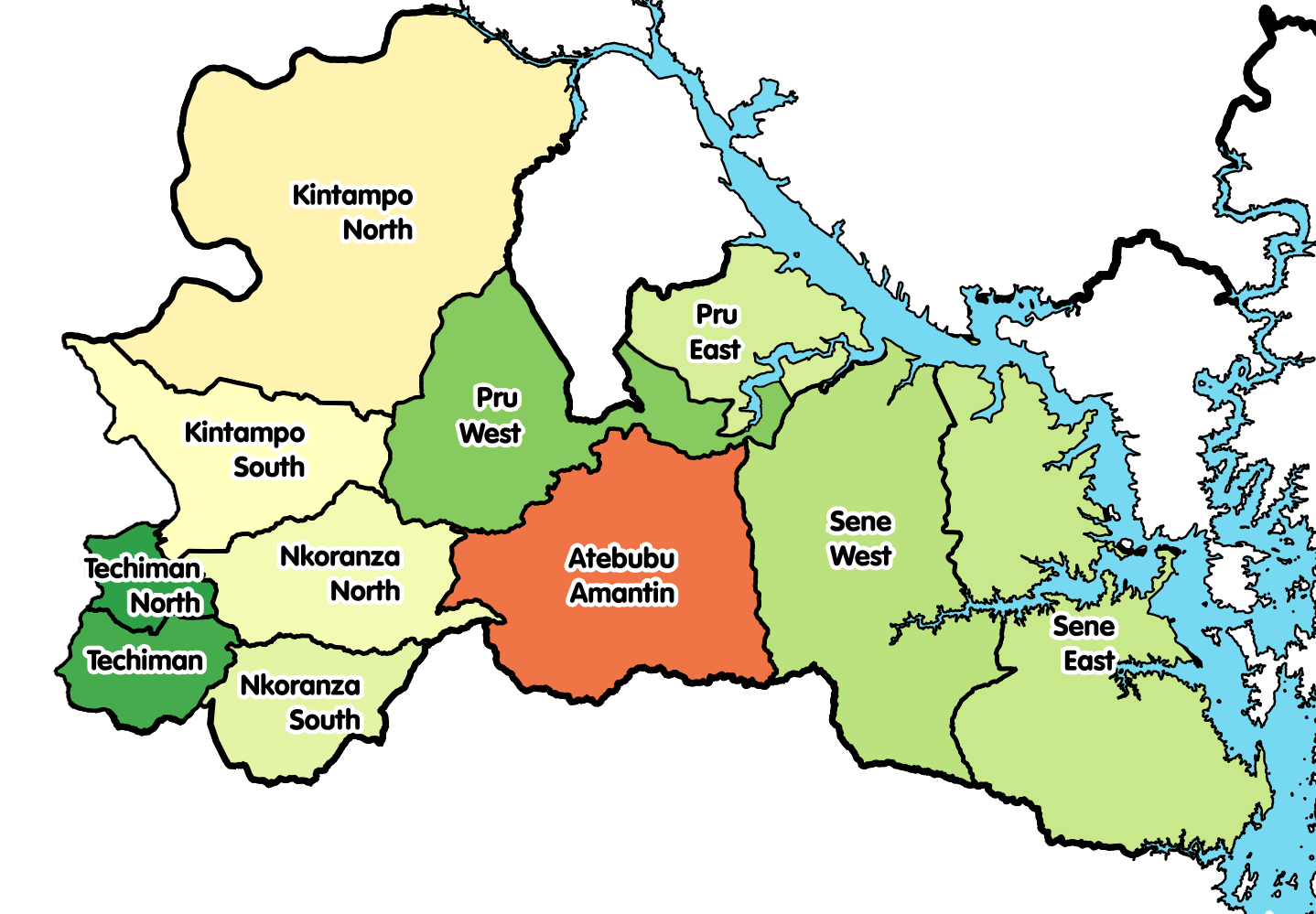
- Districts of Bono East Region

- Location of Sunyani Municipal District within Bono East Region
- Coordinates: 7°35′13″N 1°56′06″W
- Country: Ghana
- Region: Bono East
- Capital: Techiman

Government
  - Municipal Chief Executive: Hon Adjei Mensah

Area
  - Total: 1,119 km^{2} (432 sq mi)

Population (2021)
  - Total: 243,335
- Time zone: UTC+0 (GMT)

Techiman Municipal District is one of the eleven districts in Bono East Region, Ghana. It was originally created as an ordinary district assembly on 10 March 1989, when it was known as Techiman District, until the northern part of the district was split off to create Techiman North District on 28 June 2012; thus the remaining part has been retained as Techiman District. This was later elevated to municipal district assembly status and was renamed as Techiman Municipal District in that same year. The municipality is located in the western part of Bono East Region and has Techiman as its capital town.

== List of settlements ==
Settlements of Techiman Municipal District
No.	Settlement	Population	Population year
1	Ahansua		
2	Akrofrom		
3	Asueyi		
4	Aworowa		
5	Buoyem		
6	Fiaso		
7	Kenten		
8	New Techiman		
9	Nkwaeso		
10	Nsuta		
11	Mangoase		
12	Mesidan		
13	Offuman		
14	Oforikrom		
15	Takofiano		
16	Tanoboase		
17	Tanoso		
18	Techiman	99,721	2012
19	Tuobodom		

== Sources ==
- "Techiman Municipal District". Statoids.
- District: Techiman Municipal District
