= Kintampo waterfalls =

Kintampo
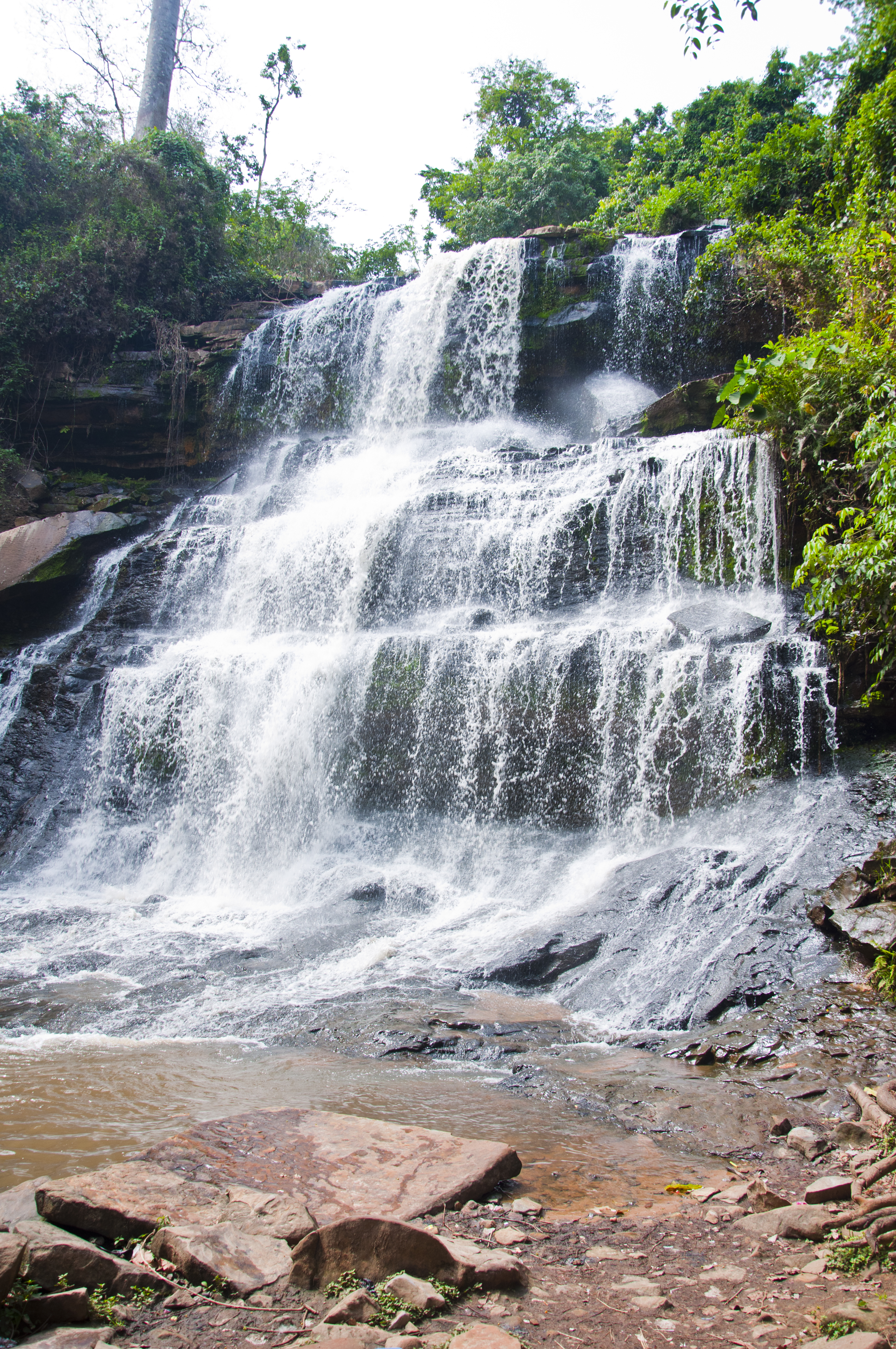

- Location within Ghana
- Location: Kintampo, Ghana
- Coordinates: 8°5′22.75″N 1°41′50.60″W
- Type: Multi-step
- Number of drops: 3
- Longest drop: 25 metres (82 ft)
- Watercourse: Pumpum

Kintampo waterfalls is one of Ghana' highest waterfalls located in Bono East. It was formerly known as Sanders Falls during the colonial days. It is located on the Pumpum river, a tributary of the Black Volta, about 4 kilometres (2.5 mi) north of the Kintampo municipality, on the Kumasi–Tamale road. It is just after the Falls Rest Stop when moving Northwards, on the right side of the road. This waterfall is hidden in the forest and formed by three main drops, with the longest measuring 25 metres (82 ft), followed by a number of steps and cascades, and the river, which falls about 70 metres (230 ft).

== Geography and geology ==
Kintampo Waterfalls consists of three main drops: the longest single drop measuring approximately 25 metres, followed by a series of steps and cascades, bringing the total height to approximately 70 metres. The falls are formed by the Pumpum River, a tributary of the Black Volta, which flows over a cliff face composed of sandstone and sedimentary rock formations characteristic of the region. The river's flow is seasonal, with peak water volume occurring during the rainy season from May to October, while the dry season (November to March) offers clearer water and easier access. The waterfall is hidden within a forest and the water originates from Pumpumatifi, the source of the Pumpum River.

== History ==
The waterfall was designated in 1992 as a tourist site, after it was discovered in the 18th century.

== Incidents ==
On 20 March 2017, 18 people were killed and others injured after a large tree fell on them at the waterfall, following a storm. Reportedly, the police declared that 22 persons were rescued. After the incident, the Ghanaian Ministry of Tourism, Arts and Culture closed the falls, to undertake a security and safety assessment, as well as reconstruction. Before reopening to the public in 2019, a canopy walkway was constructed.

== Description ==
The water flows from the Pumpum River, a tributary of the Black Volta which takes its source from Pumpumatifi. The falls has three stages. The initial two stages can be reached easily because the way is levelled. The third stage has about 173 stairs down and about 151 stairs up. The water flows from a distance of about 25 metres.

=== Facilities ===
The waterfalls currently has car park, stairs, receptive center and a canopy walkway.

== Gallery ==
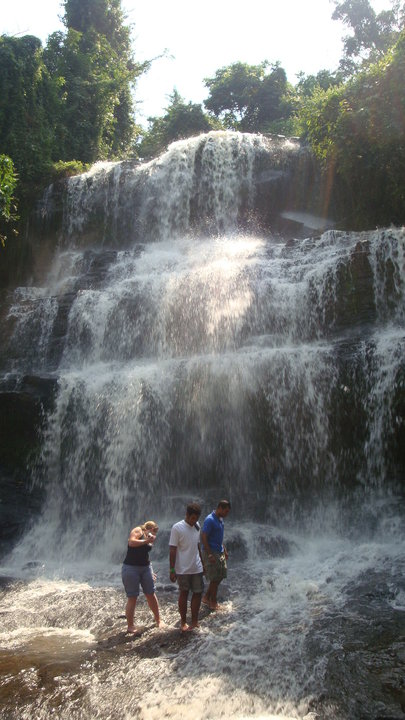
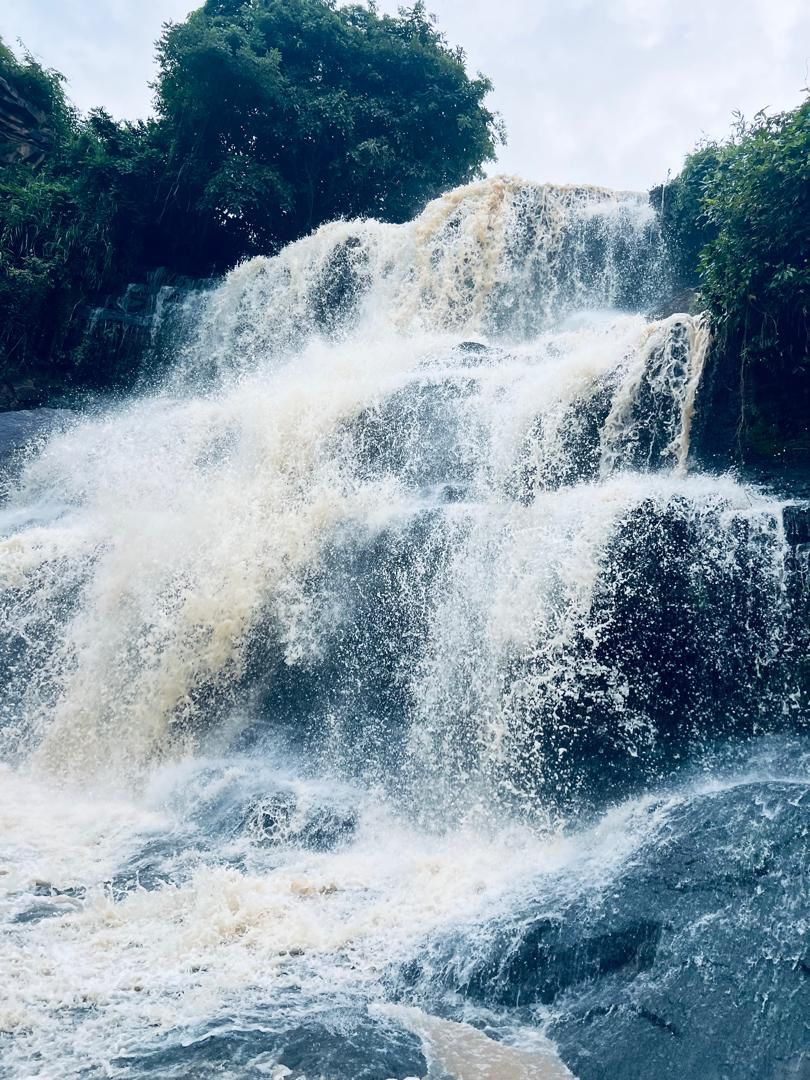
water falls (front view)
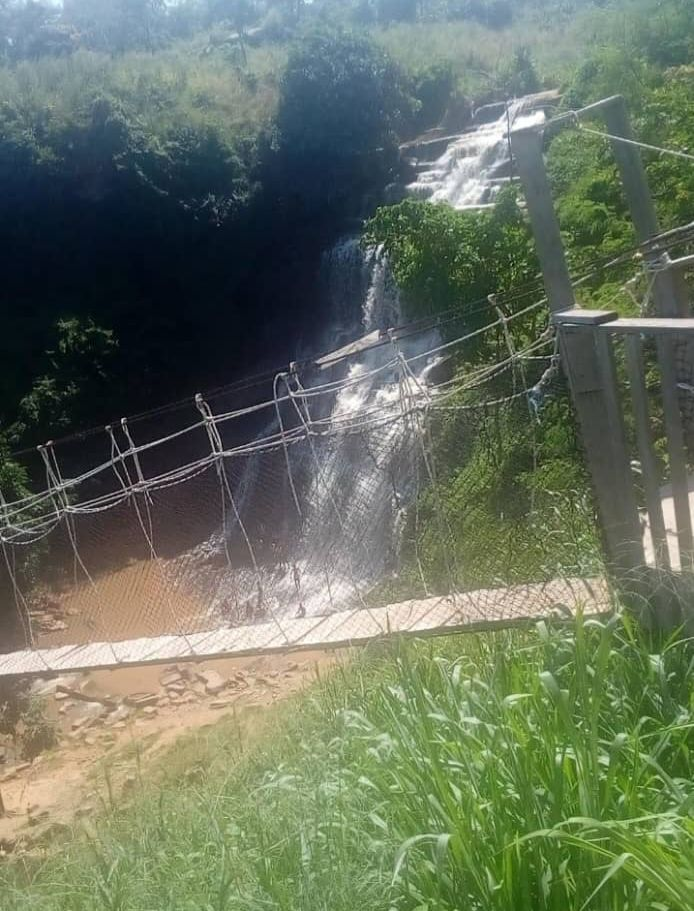
kintampo waterfalls walkway
Main drop (front view)

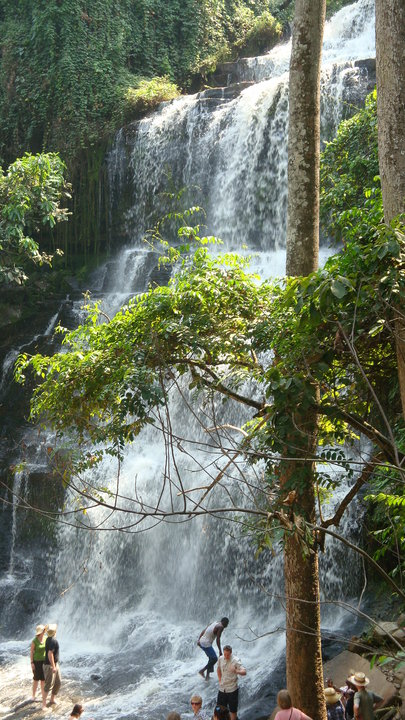
Main drop (lateral view)

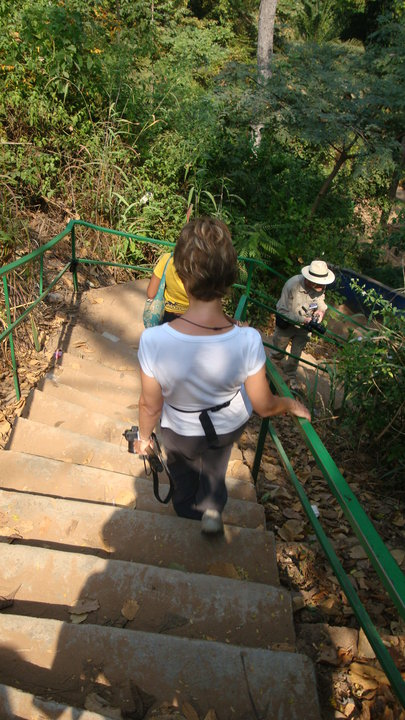
Staircase leading to the waterfall

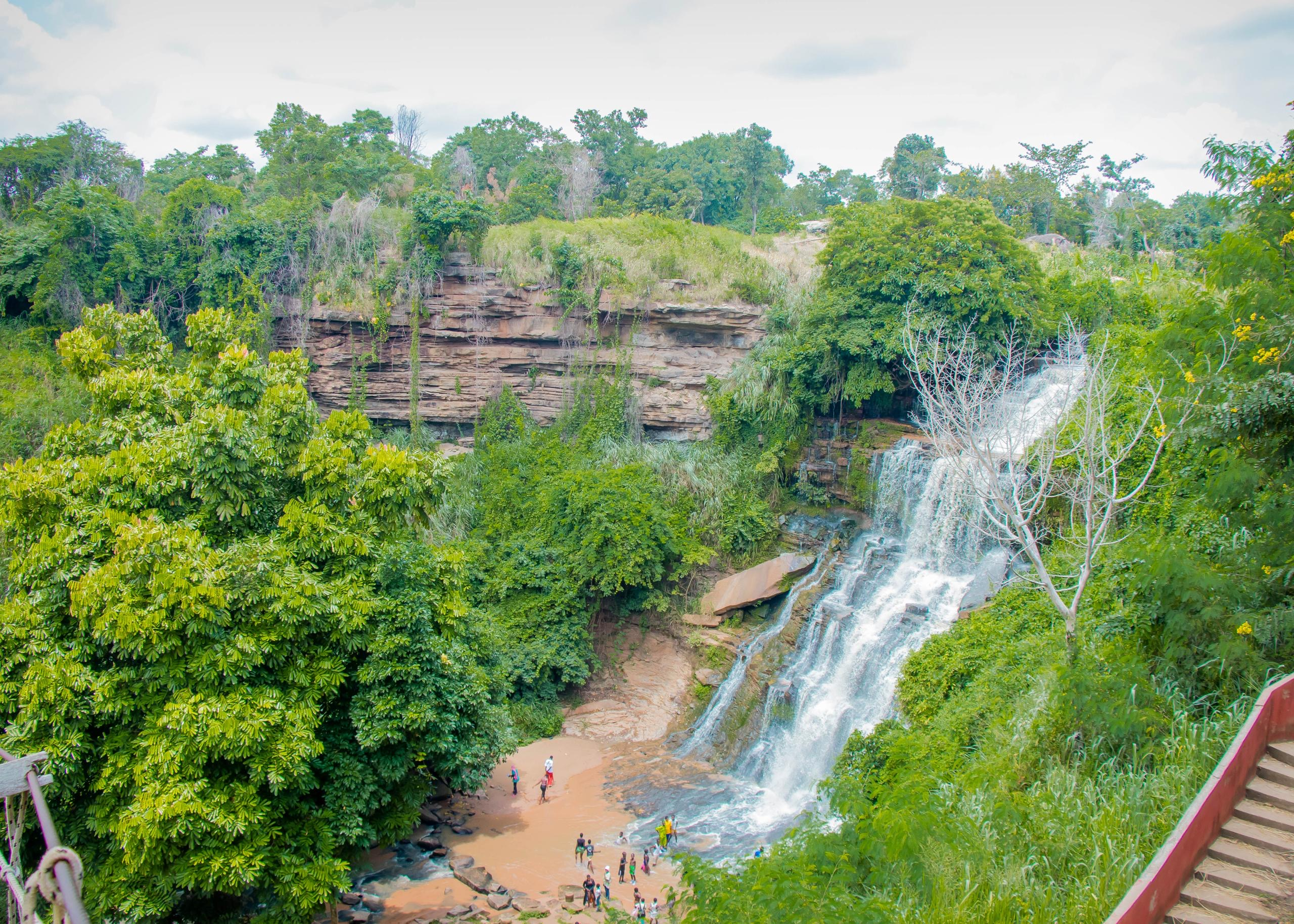
Top view of Kintampo waterfalls

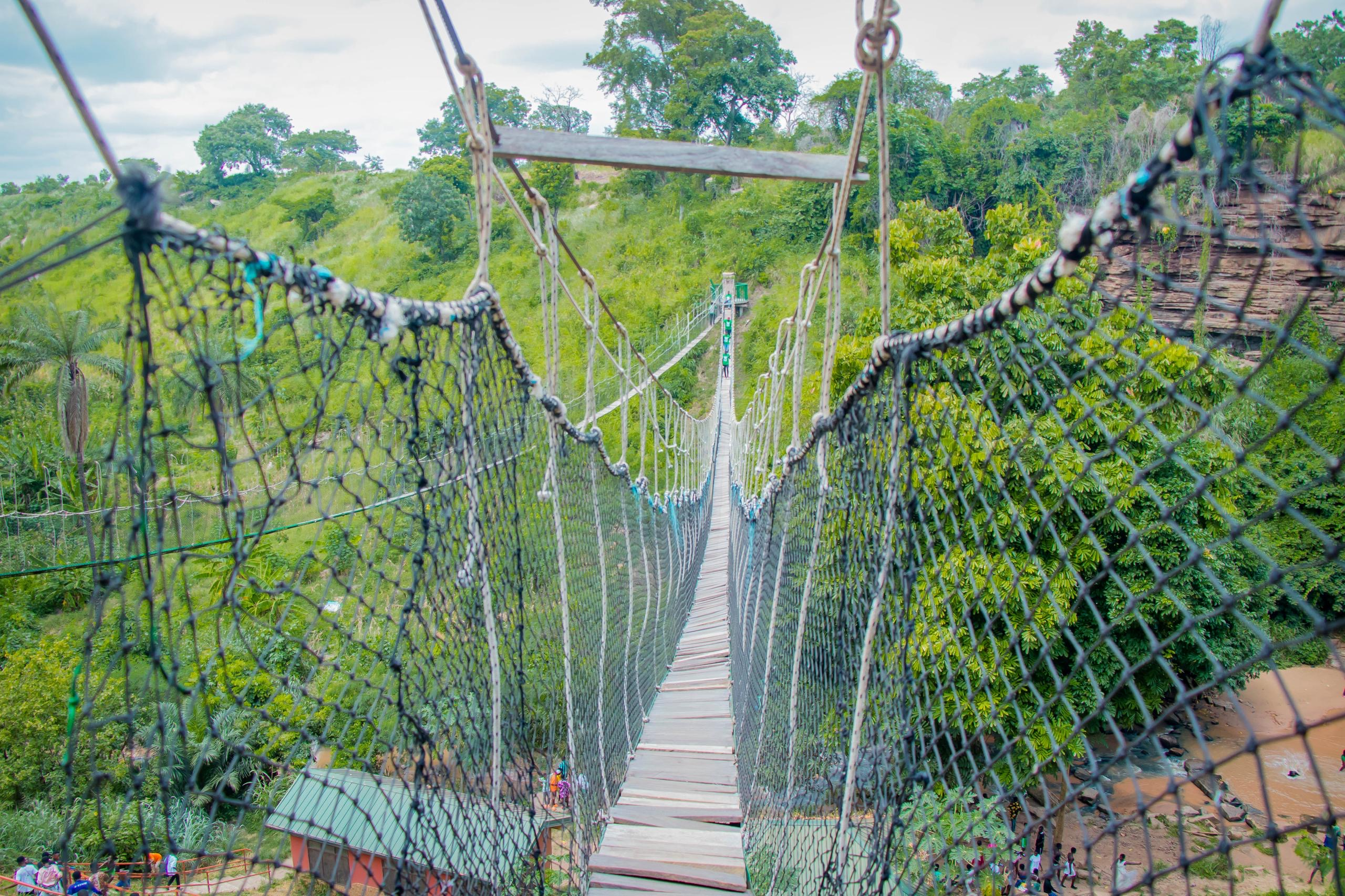
Canopy walkway

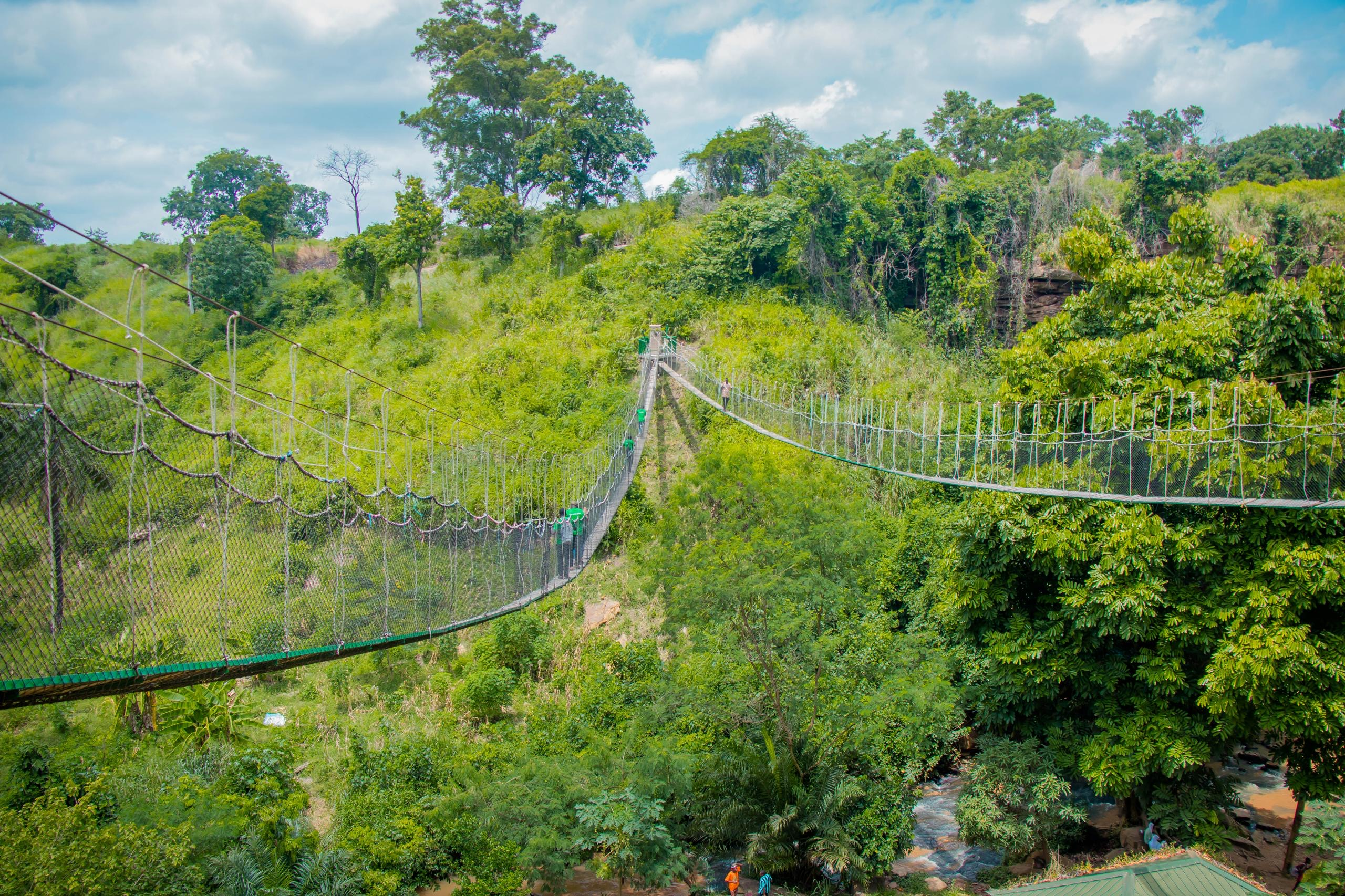
Canopy walkway at Kintampo waterfalls

== See also ==
- List of waterfalls
