= Jema =

- Interactive map of Jema
- Coordinates: 7.90°N 1.77°W
- Country: Ghana
- Region: Bono East Region

Jema is the administrative capital of Kintampo-South District in the Bono East Region of Ghana. It has an estimated population of about 7,868, while the total District population stands at 93,600. The town is known for the Jema High School. The school is the only second cycle institution in the district.

The only Government Hospital in the district is located in Jema. Mansie, Amoma, Anyima and Apesika, also communities in the district have Health Centers. The district has only one Rural Bank, which is an agency of the Kintampo Rural Bank. The Bank is located at Jema. Agriculture is a major occupation where yams, maize, cassava are some of the major crops produced and cash crops such as cashew and mangoes. Jema has a weekly market day on Tuesdays.
