= Bono East Region =

Region of Ghana

Bono East region
- Region
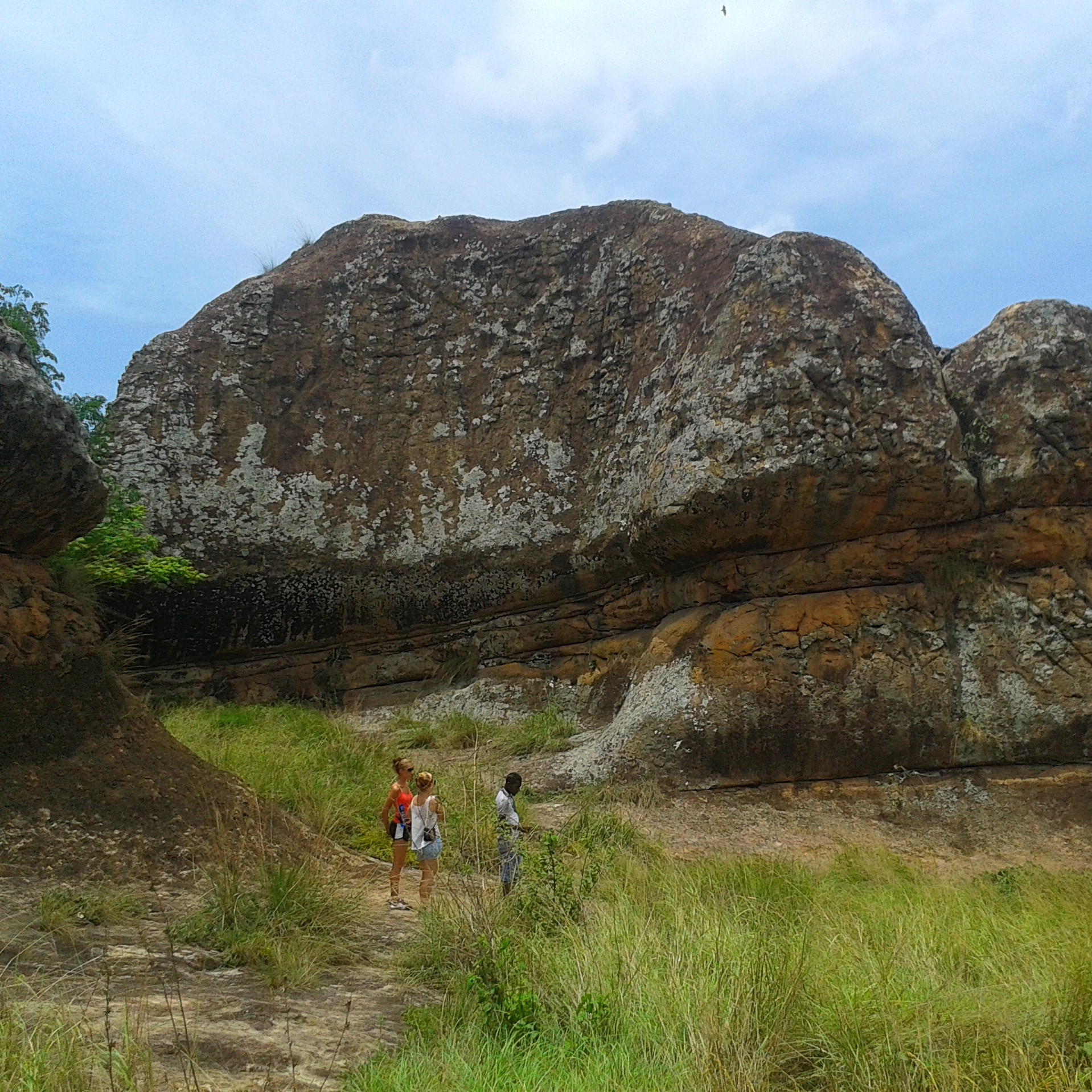
- Tanoboase Rock Valley and Sacred grove

- Bono East Region in Ghana
- Coordinates: 7°45′N 1°03′W
- Country: Ghana
- Established: 27 December 2018
- Capital: Techiman
- Districts: 11

Government
  - Regional Minister: Francis Owusu Antwi

Area
  - Total: 22,248 km^{2} (8,590 sq mi)

Population (2021 census)
  - Total: 1,203,400
  - Density: 54.090/km^{2} (140.09/sq mi)

GDP (PPP)

GDP (Nominal)
- Time zone: GMT

The Bono East region of Ghana is a new region carved out of the Brong Ahafo region. The capital of the new region is Techiman. This creation of this new region was in fulfillment of a promise made by the New Patriotic Party prior to the 2016 Ghana general election. Upon winning the elections, the President, Nana Akuffo Addo created the Ministry of Regional Reorganization to oversee policy formulation and implementation. In all six new regions are to be created from the existing ten regions of Ghana. The other regions are Ahafo, Western North, Savannah, North East, and Oti regions.

The execution of plans for the creation of the regions was seeded to the newly created Ministry of Regional Reorganization and Development which is under the leadership of Hon. Dan Botwe. Government of Ghana ministry charged with the responsibility of supervising the creation of new regions in Ghana. In March 2017, the ministry sent the blue print for the creation of the region along with others to the Council of State. The council met over 36 times from the time of submission to August 2017. The final stage for the creation of the region was decided through a referendum by the people within the catchment of the new region on 27 December 2018.

== History ==
A referendum on 27 December 2018 resulted in 450,812 casting their votes representing 85.82 per cent of 525,275 registered voters. 448,545 (99.50 per cent); voted in favour of the creation of the new region with 1,384 (0.31 per cent) voting against. A total of 883 (0.20 per cent) ballots were rejected.

== Geography and climate ==
=== Location and size ===
The Bono East Region borders on the north the Savannah Region, on the west the Bono Region, on the south the Ashanti region and on the east the Volta Lake.

=== Climate ===
The Bono East region is part of the vegetative belt of Ghana, where the climatic condition is always conducive. The vegetation consists predominantly of forest and fertile soils. Between December and April is the dry season. Sometimes the wet season is between about July and November with an average annual rainfall of 750 to 1050 mm (30 to 40 inches). The highest temperatures are reached at the end of the dry season, the lowest in December and January. However, the hot Harmattan wind from the Sahara blows frequently between December and the beginning of February which is dry and hot. The temperatures can vary between 14 °C (59 °F) at night and 40 °C (104 °F) during the day.

== Vegetation and agriculture ==
The production of yam is very high in the woodland Savannah zone in Techiman, Yeji, Nkoranza, Kintampo, Kwame Danso, Prang and others. Beans, maize, cassava, cocoyam, rice, plantains and more are produced in this region, as well as fishing activities that takes along the region's side of Lake Volta.

== Tourism and park ==
A lot of tourist sites can be found in this area

- Boabeng Fiema Monkey Sanctuary
- Buoyem Caves and bats colony, which is within the locality of Buoyem in Techiman municipality of a dry semi-deciduous forest, house a large colony of rosetta fruit bats, caves, sandstone rocks and waterfalls.
- Kintampo waterfalls
- Kintampo fuller falls

Slavery trade in the Bono East region. Located at Bono Manso on the Techiman–Kintampo road, Bono Manso was the point where slaves from the north were graded and sorted. The strongest of the captives were selected and sent to the coast leaving the weaker ones in the town. To date, African Americans and other African people in the Diaspora visit the area to learn about their origin and history.

- Kristo Boase Monastery is home to a small community of eleven Benedictine monks. The monastery is in a place of great beauty and historic interest which every year welcomes visitors from around the world.
- Tano River Sacred Fish is located at Tanoso near Techiman, it houses a pool of sacred fishes which are jealously protected by the community. Visitors always catch a glimpse of the sacred fish, said to have golden crowns.
- Nchiraa waterfalls, offers tourist a hiking adventure on a rocky and challenging footpath that leads to the waterfall. The existence of other natural and cultural tourism attractions within 10 km radius makes the tour package exhilarating. It includes the Wurobo Ancestral Cave which is located about 8 km from the Nchiraa settlement. The cave is believed to be the original dwelling place of the people of Nchiraa
- Forikrom Boten Caves and shrines, is located about eight kilometers off the Techiman–Nkoranza road, is a unique range of giant rocks which forms a haven like sort of shrine and caves. It is believed that the Magic cave which is known as the biggest cave was a refuge for women and children in times of war for Bono.
- Tanoboase Sacred Grove and Shrine is located in the Techiman municipality. It is believed that the grove is the cradle of Bono civilization. The grove served as a hideout for the Bono people during the slave trade and inter-tribal wars many, many years ago. It also serves as a place for recreation and religious activities.
- Digya National Park
- Fuller falls, it falls gently from the east over a series of cascades along the Oyoko river at Yabraso of about 7 km west of Kintampo town. It flows into the Black volta at Dwire Kumbo.

== Demographics and cultural life ==
The Bono East region has a low population density, and most inhabitants speak the Bono dialect. Bono ancestral worship and spirituality and Christianity form the dominant religions of the region.

=== Festive celebrations ===
- Apoo festival
- Kurubi festival, this festival is celebrated by the people of Kintampo in November and mainly to unite all Wangara descent in Ghana. Virgins normally dance on stilts as an interesting part of the festival.
- Nkyifie, the people of Prang celebrates it in September and October.
- Fokuo Festival, a notable festival celebrated by the people of Nkoranza(Sessiman). This festival honours the deity called "Ntoa" mostly known as "Seesiman Ntoa", who played a critical role in leading the historical wars for the people of Nkoranza making it and essential part for their heritage and traditions.

== Administrative divisions ==
The political administration of the region is through the local government system. Under this administration system, the region is divided into 11 MMDA's (made up of 0 Metropolitan, 4 Municipal and 7 Ordinary Assemblies). Each District, Municipal or Metropolitan Assembly, is administered by a Chief Executive, representing the central government but deriving authority from an Assembly headed by a presiding member elected from among the members themselves. The current list is as follows:

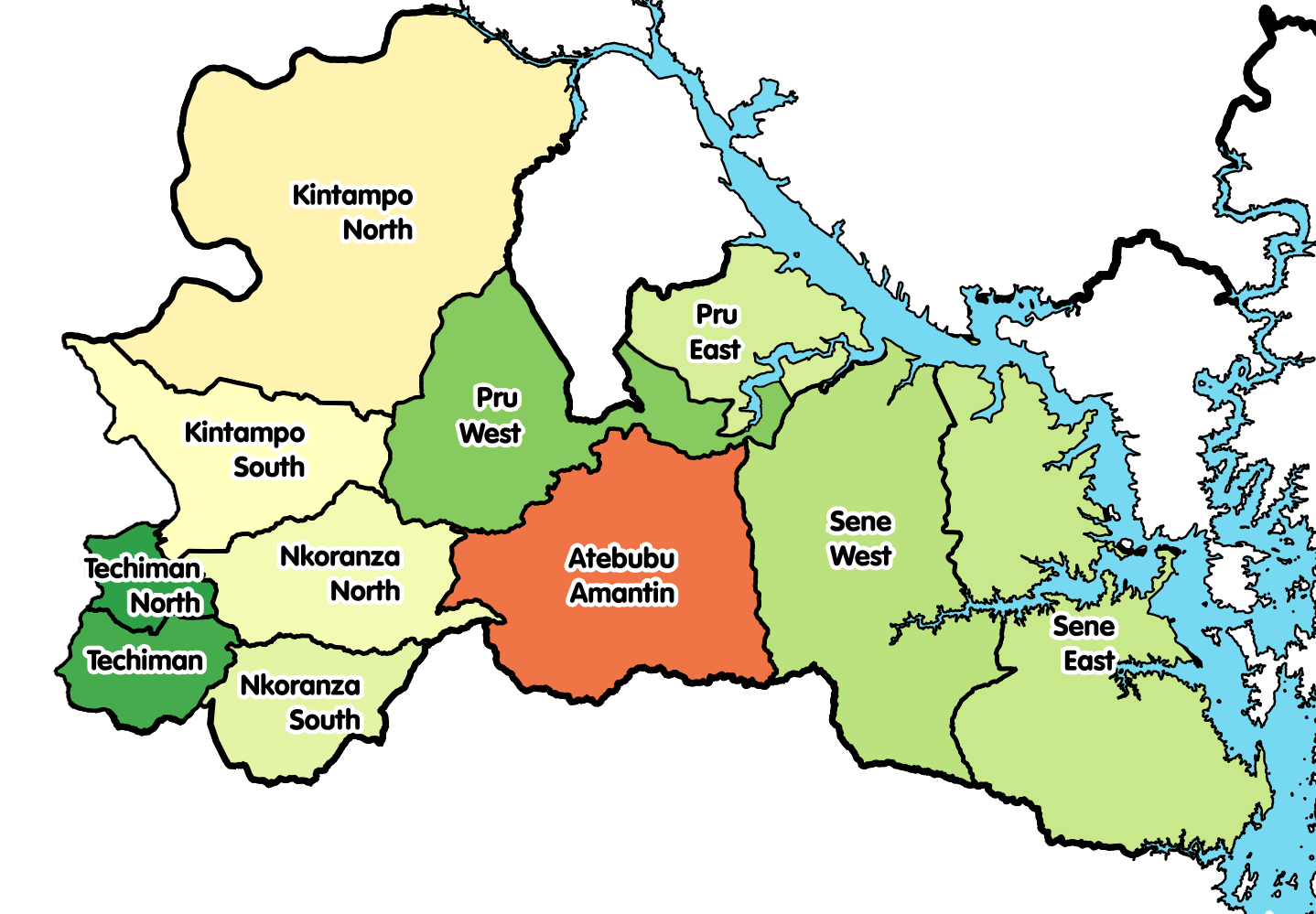
Map of Bono East Region Districts

Districts of the Bono East Region
#	MMDA Name	Capital	MMDA Type	Member of Parliament	Party
1	Atebubu-Amanten	Atebubu	Municipal	Sanja Nanja	NDC
2	Kintampo North	Kintampo	Municipal	Joseph Kwame Kuma	NDC
3	Kintampo South	Jema	Ordinary	Alexander Gyan	NPP
4	Nkoranza North	Busunya	Ordinary	Joseph Kwasi Mensah	NDC
5	Nkoranza South	Nkoranza	Municipal	Emmanuel Kwadwo Agyekum	NDC
6	Pru East	Yeji	Ordinary	Kwabena Donkor	NDC
7	Pru West	Prang	Ordinary	Stephen Jawulah	NPP
8	Sene East	Kajaji	Ordinary	Dominic Napare	NDC
9	Sene West	Kwame Danso	Ordinary	Kwame Twumasi Ampofo	NDC
10	Techiman	Techiman	Municipal	Martin Kwaku Adjei-Mensah Korsah	NPP
11	Techiman North	Tuobodom	Ordinary	Elizabeth Ofosu-Adjare	NDC
