= Busunya =

Coordinates: 7°41′N 1°40′W

- Interactive map of Busunya
- Country: Ghana
- Region: Bono East Region

Busunya is a town in the Bono East Region of Ghana. The town is known for the Busunya High School. The school is a second cycle institution. Busunya also has a health centre.
