= Amadu Ali =

Ghanaian politician

Hon. Amadu Ali

Mp for Atebubu South constituency
- In office 7 January 1993 – 6 January 2005
- Preceded by: Constituency merged
- Succeeded by: Constituency merged

Personal details
- Born: 31 July 1953 (age 73)
- Education: Tamale Business Secondary School; University of Cape Coast
- Occupation: Politician
- Profession: Teacher

Amadu Ali (born 31 July 1953) is a Ghanaian politician and also a teacher. He served as a member of parliament for the Atebubu South constituency in the Brong Ahafo Region in the second and third Parliament of the 4th republic of Ghana.

== Early life and education ==
Ali was born on 31 July 1953. He attended the Tamale Business Secondary School, where he obtained his West African Examination Certificate and after completed at the University of Cape Coast.

== Politics ==
Ali was first elected into parliament during the 1992 Ghanaian parliamentary election as the member of the first parliament of the fourth republic of Ghana on the ticket of the National Democratic Congress. Ali became member of the 2nd Parliament of the 4th Republic of Ghana when he was elected into office in the 1996 Ghanaian general elections. The term ended on 6 January 2001. He then contested for re-election during the 2000 Ghanaian general election. He won the seat with a majority of 3,645 votes. He was member of parliament for the Atebubu South constituency on the ticket of the National Democratic Congress from 7 January 1993 until he lost the seat during the 2004 Ghanaian general election to Emmanuel Owusu Manu when the constituency was merged to form the Atebubu-Amantin constituency.

== Elections ==
During the 2004 Ghanaian general election, Ali won the seat after polling 10,245 votes which was 52.70% of the total votes cast (19,430). Mumuni Ibrahim Mohammed on the ticket of the National Patriotic Party polled 6,600 votes which represents 34.00%. Another opponent of the National Reform Party (NRP) George Kwasi Nyarko polled 1,794 (9.20%). The rest of the votes were shared between Anthony Kwame Amevor of the People's National Convention (PNC) and Annor Z. Nikitins of the Convention People's Party (CPP). They polled 524 votes (2.70%) and 267 votes (1.40%) respectively.

== Personal life ==
Ali is a Muslim.
