= Foyawoo Festival =

Festival in Ghana by the Atebubu-Amanten people

Foyawoo (Foryaw Yam) Festival is an annual festival celebrated by the chiefs and people of Atebubu, Kwafie and Amanten Traditional Areas in the Bono East region, formerly Brong Ahafo Region of Ghana. It is usually celebrated in the month of October. Others also claim it is celebrated in the month of September.

== Celebrations ==
During the festival, visitors are welcomed to share food and drinks. The people put on traditional clothes and there is durbar of chiefs who are carried in palanquins. There is also horn blowing, dancing and drumming. Sacrifices are made and prayers are offered to the gods and the ancestors for peace, tranquility, prosperity, good health and long life in all their endeavors.

== Significance ==
This festival is celebrated to mark an event that took place in the past.
