= Nkoranza North (Ghana parliament constituency) =

Constituency in the Bono East Region of Ghana

- constituency for the Parliament of Ghana
- District: Nkoranza District
- Region: Bono East Region of Ghana

Current constituency
- Created: 2004
- Party: New Patriotic Party
- MP: Joseph Kwasi Mensah

Nkoranza North is one of the constituencies represented in the Parliament of Ghana. It elects one Member of Parliament (MP) by the first past the post system of election. Nkoranza North is located in the Nkoranza district of the Bono East Region of Ghana.

This seat was created prior to the Ghanaian parliamentary election in 2004 and has been held by the New Patriotic Party since then.

At the by-election held on 13 March 2007, the New Patriotic Party (NPP) candidate, Derek Oduro, won the seat with an increased majority.

== Boundaries ==
The seat is located entirely within the Nkoranza district of the Bono East Region of Ghana. It covers the northern part of the district. To the south is the Nkoranza South constituency. Its western boundary is the Techiman North constituency in the Techiman Municipal District. To the north is Kintampo South constituency in the Kintampo South District and the Pru constituency in the Pru District is north east. The eastern boundary is formed by the Atebubu Amantin constituency in the Atebubu-Amantin District. The south eastern boundary is formed by the Ejura Sekyedumase constituency in the Ejura/Sekyedumase District of the Ashanti Region.

== History ==
The constituency was first created in 2004 by the Electoral Commission of Ghana along with 29 other new ones, increasing the number of constituencies from 200 to 230.

== Members of Parliament ==
Election	Member	Party
2004	Constituency created	
2004	Eric Amoateng	New Patriotic Party
2008	Major Derek Oduro	New Patriotic Party
2020	Joseph Kwasi Mensah	National Democratic Congress

== Elections ==
2008 Ghanaian parliamentary election: Nkoranza North Source:Ghana Home Page
Party	Candidate	Votes	%	±%
New Patriotic Party	Major Derek Oduro	9,211	51.8	−11.9
National Democratic Congress	Kwadwo Agyei-Dwomor	8,142	45.8	10.2
Convention People's Party	Ameyaw Yahaya	415	2.3	N/A
Democratic People's Party	Osei Bonsu Jnr	0.0	0.0	−0.7
Majority		3,742	19.8	N/A

Nkoranza North by-election, 2007 Source:Ghana Home Page
Party	Candidate	Votes	%	±%
New Patriotic Party	Major Derek Oduro	10,179	63.7	+15.3
National Democratic Congress	Kofi Amoako-Gyambah	5,694	35.6	+7.0
Democratic People's Party	Osei Bonsu Jnr.	122	0.7	N/A
Majority		4,485	28.1	+8.3
Turnout		19,490	80.5	

2004 Ghanaian parliamentary election: Nkoranza North Source:Ghana Home Page
Party	Candidate	Votes	%	±%
New Patriotic Party	Eric Amoateng	9,144	48.4	N/A
National Democratic Congress	Francis Hayford Amoako	5,402	28.6	N/A
Independent	Prince Adjei Ofosu	4.354	23.0	N/A
Majority		3,742	19.8	N/A

== See also ==
- List of Ghana Parliament constituencies
