= George Kuntu Blankson (merchant) =

Gold Coast merchant (1809–1898)

- Born: 1809; Sodufu, Gold Coast
- Died: 23 August 1898 (aged 89); Anomabu, Gold Coast
- Occupations: Merchant; Legislator; Diplomat; Philanthropist
- Spouse: Mary Ewuraba Efua Mansa Adams

George Kuntu Blankson (1809 – 23 August 1898) was a prominent merchant, legislator, diplomat, and philanthropist in the Gold Coast (now Ghana). He was notably the first full-blooded African appointed to the Legislative Council of the Gold Coast, where he served from 1861 until 1873. In line with naming practices of the time, he anglicised his given name Kuntu—meaning "blanket" in Akan—to Blankson.

== Early life ==
Blankson was born in 1809 in Sodufu, a now-vanished Fante village situated between Elmina and Anomabu in the Gold Coast. He was the son of Chief Kuntu of Egya, who had relocated his wife to Sodufu in 1807 to escape the outbreak of war between the Fante states and the Asante.

As the son of a chief, Blankson was granted admission by Brigadier-General Sir Charles McCarthy to the Colonial School of Anomabu, where he was among the first pupils. Following the death of the headmaster, he was transferred to the Castle School in Cape Coast, where he excelled and graduated as a qualified scholar in 1824.

== Career ==
=== Early Career and Business Ventures ===
After completing his education, Blankson was first employed by a merchant named Thompson and began trading in the Ashanti region. Around the same time, he joined his friends William de Graft, John Sam, and others in founding the Society for Promoting Christian Knowledge, which later evolved into the Wesleyan Methodist Church under Reverend Joseph Dunwell. In 1834, he was detained by the Asantehene Osei Yaw Akoto for 18 months, who employed him as his secretary for political correspondence with British colonial authorities.

Blankson became a prominent merchant, particularly after forming a close relationship with Brodie Cruickshank, a Scottish trader. Upon Cruickshank's appointment as Judicial Assessor in Her Majesty's Settlements at Cape Coast Castle, he delegated the management of his business to Blankson, which prospered significantly. Impressed by his capable management, Cruickshank formally transferred ownership of both the business and his property, Castle Brew, to Blankson when he left the coast in 1854. Around that time, Cruickshank also took Blankson with him to England, where he introduced him to his former partners at the mercantile firm Foster & Smith. Leveraging this new commercial relationship, Blankson expanded his operations throughout the Central Region, establishing factories in Apam, Anomabu, Asaafa, Cape Coast, Kormantin, Mankoadze, and Winneba.

=== Diplomatic and Legislative Career ===
Blankson distinguished himself through multiple high-level diplomatic missions. In 1853, he was entrusted by the colonial administration to mediate with the Ashanti following tensions around treaty renegotiations. His success in that mission earned him official recognition from the Secretary of State and a monetary reward of £50.

In 1865, he was once again dispatched to Kumasi in the aftermath of the First Ashanti War (1863), which had ended in Ashanti victory. Despite the tense climate, Blankson successfully negotiated a peace framework. His efforts led to the arrival of four accredited Ashanti ambassadors and approximately seventy retainers in Cape Coast on 8 January 1866 to formalize peace terms. Then Governor, Colonel Edward Conran, praised the mission's success, noting in a dispatch to the Secretary of State that, “instead of another hostile invasion of the protectorate by the warlike King of Ashanti, we are to be invaded by peaceable traders for the future, which suits the purposes of Great Britain.”

Blankson also mediated in other regional conflicts. In 1869, during the Dutch-Komenda War, he successfully secured the release of three captured Dutch officers after prolonged negotiations, working in coordination with the Fante Confederation. In 1870, he intervened again to resolve a standoff involving Ashanti captives intercepted by the Assins and Aburas, ensuring their release.

In recognition of his diplomatic and administrative accomplishments, Blankson was appointed an Official Administrator in October 1856 and Justice of the Peace in May 1857. His public service peaked in 1861 when he became the first full-blooded African to serve as an unofficial member of the Gold Coast Legislative Council, a position he held until 1873. His contributions were widely respected, with Governor Conran describing him in 1870 as “one of his ablest members,” whose advice was often sought on major decisions.

=== Military Contributions ===
Blankson also played a critical role in military affairs during periods of conflict on the Gold Coast. In 1863, during renewed threats of invasion by the Ashanti, the seven Asafo companies of Anomabu elected him as their commander-in-chief. He led them into battle at Assin Mansu, helping to repel the Ashanti forces and earning praise from colonial authorities. For his service, he was awarded the honorary rank of Lieutenant-Colonel of the Native Forces by Governor Richard Pine.

== Controversy and Imprisonment ==
Blankson's military involvement later became the source of controversy. In 1873, shortly after attending what would be his final Legislative Council meeting on 7 February, war broke out again between the Fante and the Ashanti. Blankson accompanied the allied forces to Teitee, but following an early setback, accusations arose—fueled by rumors and political rivalries—that he had colluded with the Ashanti, citing his prior captivity and correspondence with the Asantehene in 1834.

He was declared a public enemy and arrested, facing charges of treason. While the British administration intervened to prevent his execution, he was imprisoned at Cape Coast Castle and suspended from the Legislative Council, ending his 12-year tenure. He was eventually acquitted in 1874 after a formal inquiry revealed the accusations to be unfounded, but the incident severely damaged his reputation and business interests.

== Personal life ==
Blankson married Mary Ewuraba Efua Mansa Adams of Christiansborg and Anomabu. The couple had seven children, three of whom predeceased their mother. Mary died on 23 July 1868 at the age of 53, during the peak of Blankson's public career.

Blankson was able to send his children to England for their education. His son, George Blankson Jr. (b. 1841), was a contemporary of John Mensah Sarbah, contributed to the Fanti Constitution, and later practiced as a Native Advocate at the Supreme Court of Justice in Cape Coast, where he also served as Clerk of Courts.

Mary Blankson's support was considered instrumental to her husband's success in public life. Following her death and the events of 1873, Blankson withdrew from politics and devoted himself to religious life and philanthropy.

== Philanthropy ==
Following the events of 1873 and his suspension from the Legislative Council, Blankson withdrew from public life and redirected his focus toward religious devotion and philanthropy. Deeply impacted by the accusations and the loss of his career and trade, he turned to Christianity, a faith he had embraced from a young age.

His religious contributions were significant. He financed the construction of the Ebenezer Chapel in Anomabu and funded the establishment of a mission school at Mankoadze, even choosing to pay the salaries of the schoolmaster and all expenses associated with running the institution. Additionally, Blankson became a lay preacher and actively led services at Anomabu, managing one of the mission stations well into his later years.

== Death and legacy ==
George Kuntu Blankson died on 23 August 1898 in Anomabu, at the age of 89. Although his later years were marked by political controversy and personal loss, his contributions to commerce, diplomacy, and early colonial governance in the Gold Coast have left a lasting legacy. He is widely recognized as one of the first full-blooded Africans to serve on the Legislative Council of the Gold Coast, and played a significant role in promoting peaceful relations with the Asante Empire, expanding regional trade, and supporting the spread of Methodist Christianity along the coast.
