= G. E. Ferguson =

Ghanaian scientist (1864–1897)

George Ekem Ferguson (14 July 1864 – 7 April 1897), also known as Ekow Atta, was a Fante civil servant, surveyor and cartographer who worked in the British colony of the Gold Coast (modern Ghana).

== Early life ==
Ferguson was born in Anomabu. His father was Robert Archibald Ferguson, who worked for the trading company F. & A. Swanzy in Winneba, while his grandfather, Samuel Ferguson, worked as a physician. He had a twin brother, who died in infancy, and four sisters. Little is known of his mother except that she was a Christian. Ferguson was born into an upper-class family whose lifestyle, like those of their peers, was strongly influenced by British customs.

Ferguson was educated from an early age, attending primary school in the Cape Coast. He proceeded to enter the Wesleyan Boys High School, located at Freetown, in 1876. The secondary school was founded by the Krio May family under the auspices of the Methodist Society on 6 April 1874. Ferguson's studies there included mathematics, geography, British and ancient history, classics, French, photography, and religious education.

== Career ==
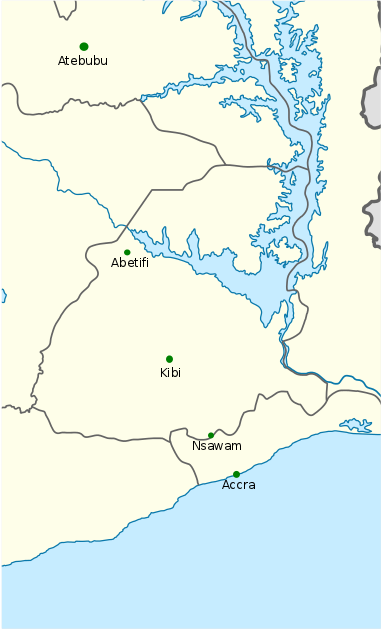
Major settlements visited by Ferguson during his 1890 journey from Accra to Atebubu

He left school in 1881, and, considering becoming a Methodist minister, returned to Cape Coast, where he worked as a teacher at the Wesleyan Boy's High School. Later in the year, he joined the Colonial Service and received a position at the Governor's office. In November 1882, he was appointed as Clerk to the Queen's Advocate, with a salary of £60. By 1886 he had returned to the Governor's office, as a Junior Clerk, and by 1889 he had been promoted to Second Clerk, with a salary of £120. During this period, he travelled with the Governor on visits to Prasu (1881), to Lagos (1881, 1882, 1884), to Keta, Ada, Krobo and Akwapim (1882) and to Wassa and Nzima (1888). Ferguson was invaluable to the colonial authorities in the arbitration of tribal disputes, such as that between the Krobo and Akwamu in 1886, because he could speak Fanti and Ga, allowing him to communicate with the vast majority of the southern inhabitants of the colony. He also produced a map of the colony and conducted a survey of the water supply of Accra during this period as part of his official duties.

After eight years service as a junior civil servant, Ferguson applied to study one-year course at the Royal College of Science, London. He was given paid leave by the colonial authorities, who encouraged his educational ambitions. In London, he studied mining, geology, surveying, mathematics and astronomy; performing well in his June exams, he received a First Class diploma. In September 1890, he returned to the Gold Coast. On October 21 of the same year, the Governor asked Ferguson to travel from Accra to Atebubu, in order to prospect for precious stones, as well as producing a report on the quality of the roads and the status of local trade. Upon reaching Atebubu, Ferguson negotiated a treaty with the local chiefs, who feared aggression from the Ashanti Empire, which they had seceded from in 1875. (Ahrin 1985, pp. 7–8) His report from the expedition was published and may have influenced Albert Ernest Kitson to search for diamonds in the region in 1919. (Ahrin 1974, pp. 26–7)

Ferguson was appointed as a Supernumerary Foreman of Works in 1891. In the same year he was ordered to survey the River Volta and Keta lagoon. The colonial authorities were interested in the possibility of filling the lagoon from the river during the dry season, to prevent the lagoon becoming unnavigable. (Thomas 1972, pp. 181–215) Ferguson also worked on a proposed light railway to transport gold from Ancobra to the port of Axim.

The border between Gold Coast and the German colony of Togoland had been fixed in 1887, temporarily creating a neutral zone which contained important towns such as Salaga and Bimbila. In 1890, the Heligoland–Zanzibar Treaty resulted in a redemarcation, and in 1892 Ferguson assisted two British District Commissioners in surveying the new border. The maps produced by the British were significantly better than those by their German counterparts, mainly due to Ferguson's involvement in the project.

He took additional responsibilities as Inspector of Trade Roads from October 1893.

== Death ==
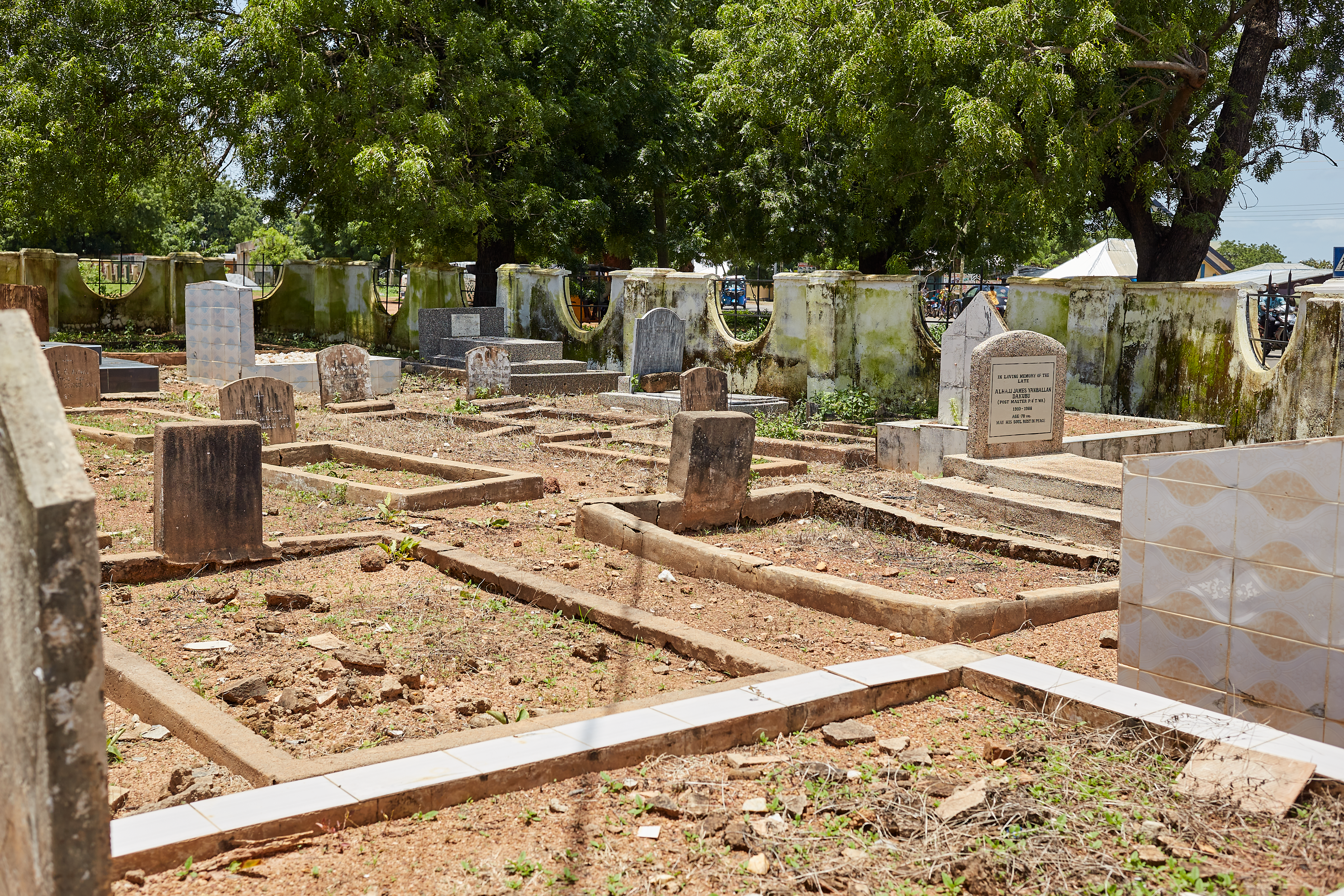
An inside view of the George Ekem Ferguson graveyard

Ferguson was killed near Wa by a slave raider and Mande warlord known by the name Samori in 1897. His mortal remains were buried in Wa (in the Upper West Region of Ghana), a graveyard that is now called the George Ekem Ferguson graveyard.
