= Nana Abe Festival =

Festival in Ghana by the people of Abease

Nana Abe Festival is an annual festival celebrated by the chiefs and people of Abease Traditional Area in the Pru West District in the Bono East region, formerly Brong Ahafo Region of Ghana.

== Celebrations ==
During the festival, visitors are welcomed to share food and drinks. The people put on traditional clothes and there is durbar of chiefs. There is also dancing and drumming.

== Significance ==
This festival is celebrated to mark an event that took place in the past. This festival is celebrated to commemorate the peaceful settlement of the people at their present abode.
