= Derrick Oduro =

Ghanaian politician

Hon. Derrick Oduro

Deputy Minister
- In office March 2017 – 6 January 2021
- President: Nana Akuffo-Addo
- Succeeded by: Joseph Kwasi Mensah

Personal details
- Born: February 23, 1958 (age 68) Dromankese, Ghana
- Party: New Patriotic Party
- Occupation: Politician
- Profession: Ghana army

Derrick Oduro (born 23 February 1958) is a Ghanaian politician who is also a retired military personnel with the Ghana Army and has a rank of major. He is a member of the New Patriotic Party and the deputy Minister for Defence in Ghana. He is also a member of parliament for Nkoranza North Constituency in the then Brong Ahafo region now Bono East Region.

== Early life and education ==
Oduro hails from Dromankese in the then Brong Ahafo Region now Bono East Region of Ghana. He holds a Masters of Arts in governance and leadership from the Ghana Institute of Management and Public Administration (GIMPA). He also holds a Diploma in Public Finance from the Institute of Accountancy Training and a Certificate from Cranfield University.

== Career and politics ==
Oduro begun his career as a bursar at Akosas Business College from 1977 to 1979. After which he was drafted into the military from 1979 to 2005. He retired from the military and became a presiding member of the Nkoranza District Assembly from 2005 to 2007. In 2007, under the ticket of the New Patriotic Party, Derrick Oduro defeated his opponents from other political parties to represent the Nkoranza North Constituency and has represented his constituency to date.

He contested in the 2020 Ghanaian general election on the ticket of the New Patriotic Party and lost to Joseph Kwasi Mensah of the National Democratic Congress. Joseph Mensah obtained 15,124 of the valid vote cast while Oduro polled 10,978 votes.

== Personal life ==
Derrick Oduro is married with six children and is a practising Seventh Day Adventist.

== Committees ==
He is part of Gender and Children Committee, Business Committee and also the Youth, Sports and Culture Committee.
