= Abease =

Town in Bono East, Ghana

Coordinates: 7°57′28″N 1°10′55″W

Abease is a town in the Pru West District in Bono East Region of Ghana. The town is the paramount seat of 'Abeasehene'. It is located midway between Prang and Kintampo. The population is mainly peasant farmers.

The main attraction in this village is the annual yam festival called "Kwabena". During this festival, the Paramount Chief pours a series of libations, culminating with the Chief being carried in a palanquin amidst drumming, singing, and dancing.

The town has a Community Day Senior High School established by former President of the Republic of Ghana, John Dramani Mahama.
