= Atebubu District =

- Former District
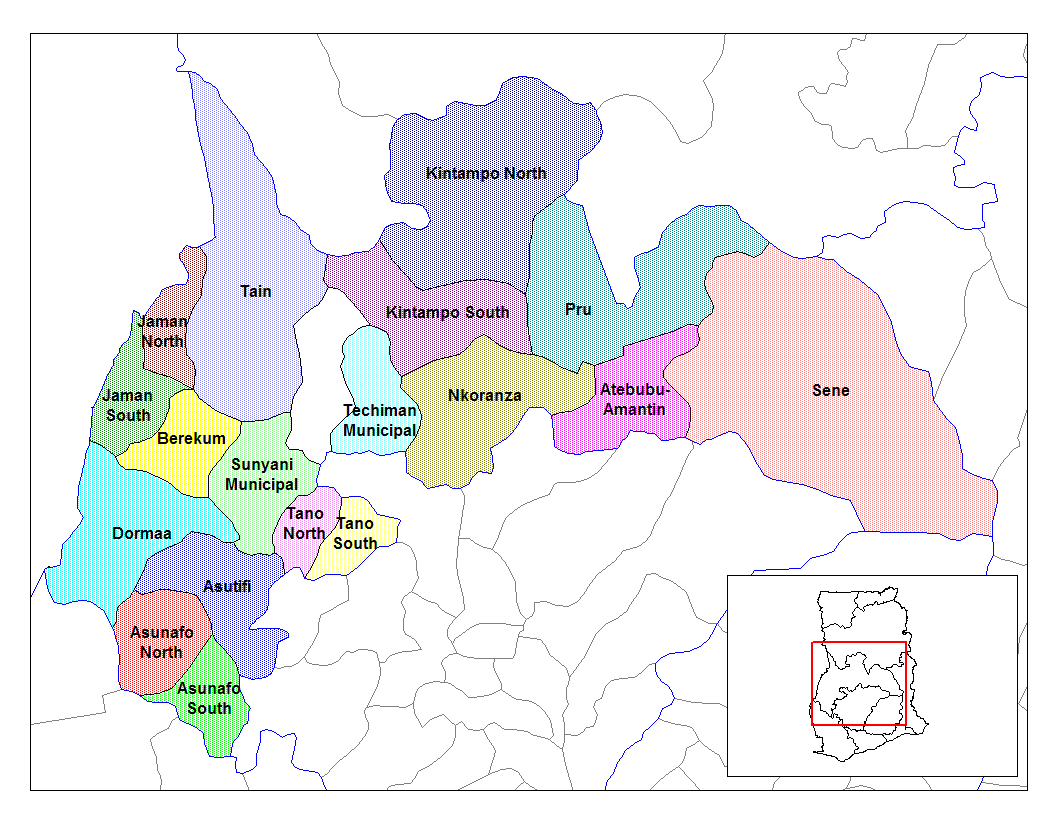
- Districts of Brong-Ahafo Region

- Location of Atebubu District within Brong-Ahafo
- Coordinates: 7°45′N 0°59′W
- Country: Ghana
- Region: Brong-Ahafo
- Capital: Atebubu

Area
  - Total: 4,407 km^{2} (1,702 sq mi)

Population (2012)
  - Total: —
- Time zone: UTC+0 (GMT)

Atebubu District is a former district that was located in Brong-Ahafo Region (now currently in Bono East Region), Ghana. Originally created as an ordinary district assembly on 10 March 1989. However, on 12 November 2003 (effectively 18 February 2004), it was split off into two new districts: Atebubu-Amantin District (which it was elevated to municipal district assembly status on 15 March 2018; capital: Atebubu) and Pru District (capital: Yeji). The district assembly was located in the east central part of Brong-Ahafo Region (now east central part of Bono East Region) and had Atebubu as its capital town.

== Sources ==
- "Atebubu District". Statoids.
- District: Atebubu District
- 19 New Districts Created , November 20, 2003.
