= Atebubu-Amantin (Ghana parliament constituency) =

Constituency in the Bono East Region of Ghana

Atebubu-Amantim
- constituency for the Parliament of Ghana
- Region: Bono East Region of Ghana

Current constituency
- Party: National Democratic Congress
- MP: Sanja Nanja

Atebubu-Amantin constituency of the Atebubu-Amantin district formerly the Atebubu district in 2003. The Atebubu-Amantin district was formed by the legislative instrument LI 1770. The constituency can be found in the Bono East region, which was part of the former Brong Ahafo region of Ghana.

== Members of parliament ==
Emmanuel Owusu-Mainu was the member of parliament for the constituency after its creation in 2003. He was elected twice in the 2004 and 2008 parliamentary elections. This was on the ticket of the National Democratic Congress (NDC). In the 2008 parliamentary elections he won by a majority of 3,395 votes. As a result, he represented the constituency as its member of parliament in the 4th and 5th parliaments of the 4th republic of Ghana. Sanja Nanja succeeded Emmanuel Owusu-Mainu in the 2012 parliamentary elections also on the ticket of the National Democratic Congress after the dissolution of the 5th parliament of the 4th republic of Ghana. He therefore represented the constituency as the member of parliament in the 6th parliament of the 4th republic of Ghana. Kofi Amoakohene of the New Patriotic Party succeeded Sanja Nanja in the 2016 parliamentary elections after the dissolution of the 6th parliament of the 4th republic of Ghana. He thus represented Atebubu-Amantin constituents as their member of parliament in the 7th parliament of the 4th republic of Ghana.

== See also ==
- List of Ghana Parliament constituencies
