= Kofi Amoakohene =

Ghanaian politician

Hon Kofi Amoakohene

Member of the Ghana Parliament for Atebubu-Amantin Constituency
- In office 7 January 2017 – 6 January 2021
- Succeeded by: Sanja Nanja

Personal details
- Born: April 11, 1969 (age 57) Atebubu, Ghana
- Party: New Patriotic Party
- Education: Central University
- Occupation: Chief Executive Officer
- Profession: Politician

Kofi Amoakohene is a Ghanaian politician and member of the Seventh Parliament of the Fourth Republic of Ghana representing the Atebubu-Amantin Constituency in the Bono East Region on the ticket of the New Patriotic Party. He was the former Bono East Regional Minister.

== Early life and education ==
Amoakohene was born on 11 April 1969 and hails from Atebubu in the Bono East Region of Ghana. He had his Bachelor of Science degree in administration from the Central University in Accra in 2005.

== Career ==
Amoakohene was the chief executive officer for Customer Company Limited in Accra.

=== Politics ===
Amoakohene is a member of the New Patriotic Party. He was the former Member of Parliament for Atebubu-Amantin Constituency. In the 2020 Ghanaian general elections, he lost to the NDC parliamentary candidate Sanja Nanja. He was the Regional Minister for Bono East Region before losing his seat. He lost with 22,785 votes making 41.27% of the total votes cast.

== Personal life ==
Amoakohene is a Christian.
