= Eric Amoateng =

Ghanaian politician

Hon. Eric Amoateng

Member of the Ghana Parliament for Nkoranza North Constituency
- In office 7 January 2005 – 21 March 2007
- President: John Kufuor
- Preceded by: New constituency
- Succeeded by: Derek Oduro

Personal details
- Born: 19 February 1953 (age 73)
- Party: New Patriotic Party
- Education: University of Ghana
- Profession: Teacher

Eric Amoateng is a politician and a former Member of Parliament in Ghana. He was arrested for drug trafficking in 2005 in the United States and jailed.

== Early life and education ==
Boron was born in Ghana on 19 February 1953. He had his secondary education at Nkoranza Anglican School in Nkoranza, where he passed his O-levels. He then attended Nkoranza Training College in Nkoranza for his A-level education, completing it in 1973. He then attended the Nkoranza Teacher Training College from where he qualified as a teacher. Years later, he attended the University of Ghana, obtaining a diploma in religion in 1992.

== Career ==
Amoateng initially worked as a teacher. He then worked as marketing manager for the Koajay company, that bought and distributed school supplies.

Amoateng was also the chief (king) of Amoma, a town in the Kintampo South District of the Brong Ahafo Region, with the title Nana Amoateng Ameyaw II. He is said to have spent lavishly on his people and earned a reputation for philanthropy.

== Politics ==
Amoateng unsuccessfully bid to stand as the New Patriotic Party (NPP) candidate for the Nkoranza constituency in 2000 amidst some controversy. Some were reportedly wary of his affluence. It was also reported that, in 2001, Amoateng was accused of visa fraud.

Amoateng renounced his chieftaincy in 2004 in order to stand in the December 2004 parliamentary elections on the ticket of the NPP, adopting Bomini in the neighbouring Nkoranza North constituency in the Nkoranza District of the Brong Ahafo region of Ghana, as his home town. His candidacy for the Nkoranza North constituency was challenged at the Sunyani High Court in 2004, but the case was eventually withdrawn. He won 46.9 per cent of the votes with a margin of 22.3 per cent to become the first ever Member of Parliament for the newly created Nkoranza North constituency, from 7 January 2005.

== Elections ==
Amoateng was elected as the member of parliament for the Nkoranza North in the 2004 Ghanaian general elections. He thus represented the constituency in the 4th parliament of the 4th republic of Ghana. He was elected with 9,144 votes out of 18,900 valid votes cast. This was equivalent to 48.40% of total valid votes cast. He was elected over Hayford Francis Amoako of the National Democratic Congress and Kwame Ofosu Adjei Prince an independent candidate. These obtained 5,402 and 4,354 votes respectively. These were equivalent to 28.60% and 23.00% respectively of total valid votes cast. Amoateng was elected on the ticket of the New Patriotic Party. The New Patriotic Party won 14 parliamentary seats out of the total 24 seats for the Brong Ahafo region. In that election of 2004, the party won a majority total of 128 parliamentary seats out of a total 230 parliamentary seats.

== Arrest, trial and jail ==
Amoateng was arrested in the United States of America on 12 November 2005. He had travelled to the USA on an Emirates flight to the John F. Kennedy International Airport (JFK) with a friend, Nii Okai Adjei. The trip was ostensibly to buy wrist watches for resale in Ghana with US$9,000 seized from Amoateng. Seven boxes of pottery which had landed at Newark Liberty International Airport from London, destined for JFK a day earlier, were found to contain 136 pounds of heroin. The reported street value of the drugs was about US$6 million. Amoateng and Adjei were monitored by security personnel as they took delivery of the cargo and sent it to a self-storage location on Staten Island. They were arrested the next day when they went to inspect the goods. Amoateng unsuccessfully claimed diplomatic immunity following his arrest. They were charged with "conspiracy with intent to distribute heroin".

Amoateng and Adjei initially pleaded not guilty to the charge of conspiracy to distribute narcotics when brought to court. Adjei later changed his plea to guilty. Following this, a second charge was brought against Amoateng. In August 2006, a third charge of "distributing a controlled narcotic substance of about a kilogram or more containing heroin" was brought against Amoateng.

On 19 March 2007, Amoateng changed his plea to guilty. He was sentenced on 12 December 2007 to ten years in jail. He served his sentence at the Moshannon Valley Correctional Center in Pennsylvania, United States.

== Fallout from arrest ==
=== Parliament ===
Following his arrest, there was a long debate as to whether Amoateng should remain MP for Nkoranza North. Kyei-Mensah-Bonsu, Majority Chief Whip, maintained that "until the case is disposed off he remains a suspect and that the allegation would have to be substantiated". While the majority leader in parliament announced that the government would hold the fort for the MP, the opposition insisted that a by-election be held to replace him. This went on for more than ten months. One of his sons, Augustine Akwasi Amoateng, defended his father's innocence in April 2006. Amoateng eventually sent a letter of resignation around May 2006 to parliament but this was rejected on procedural grounds. The Speaker of Parliament, Ebenezer Sekyi-Hughes, directed on 30 January 2007, that the question of Amoateng's long absence from parliament be revisited. However, he sent a resignation letter dated 4 February 2007, to the Speaker of the Parliament of Ghana which was accepted.

By-elections to replace Amoateng were finally held on 13 March 2007, 16 months after his arrest. The seat was won by Derek Oduro, a retired army major, who was sworn in on 21 March 2007.

=== Investigations within Ghana ===
Investigations instituted within Ghana in order to possibly seize assets obtained through drugs appear to have fizzled out. The Narcotic Controls Board (NACOB) had identified assets of Amoateng's accomplice, Nii Okai Adjei but were unable to pursue the assets of Amoateng possibly due to interference by officials of the NPP government. NACOB indicated its intention to reopen investigations when Amoateng returns to Ghana. He was arrested for questioning by NACOB on his arrival in Ghana on 7 August 2014, at the Accra International Airport. He was detained at the Nima Police Station for four days until he could satisfy conditions of bail set by an Accra Circuit Court.

Amoateng also faced trial for possessing fake travel documents on his return. His Ghanaian passport with number H2347080 which was issued in February 2009 while he was still in jail, was the same as that issued by the Ghanaian immigration authorities to a woman. He was, however, acquitted because, although the prosecution was convinced the passport was fraudulently acquired, the High Court said the prosecution failed to prove that Amoateng was aware that his passport was forged. In 2017, 12 years after his arrest and three years after his release from jail, NACOB stated they were unable to confiscate his assets as they still do not have the details of his judgement from the United States.

== Trivia ==
- On 13 February 2006, the Nkoranza constituency branch chairman of the NPP commended the volunteers who worked on Amoateng's 300 hectare maize farm in his absence.
- On 24 March 2006, a rally was held in his support by the people of Busunya attended by NPP delegates. Some placards at the rally read "Cocaine or No Cocaine Amoateng Is Still Our MP".
- In April 2007, the chiefs and people of Busunya in the Nkoranza district named a street after Amoateng for his "contribution to the socio-economic development of the area". He is also reported to have helped to "finance the construction of eight streets and drainage systems in the town which is the constituency capital".

== Notes ==
Parliament of Ghana
Preceded by Newly created constituency^{1}	Member of Parliament for Nkoranza North; 2005^{2} – 2007^{3}	Succeeded by Major (rtd) Derek Oduro^{4} (from March 2007)
Notes and references
1. Newly created constituency before December 2004 elections 2. From 7 January 2005; 3. Until 4 February 2007; 4. Sworn in on 21 March 2007
