= Antelope (1797 ship) =

History

Dutch Republic & Batavian Republic
- Name: Unknown
- Builder: Batavia
- Launched: 1792
- Captured: 1797

Great Britain
- Name: Antelope
- Owner: Hueston or T.Hughan
- Acquired: 1797 by capture
- Fate: Unknown

General characteristics
- Type: Brig
- Tons burthen: 215 (bm)
- Propulsion: Sails
- Complement: 20
- Armament: 10 × 4-pounder guns + 6 × 12-pounder carronades
- Notes: Teak

Antelope was built at Batavia in 1792 and captured in 1797. Captain Thomas Finnan (or Fennan) acquired a letter of marque on 8 May 1798. She sailed from London on 20 May to gather slaves from Africa. She embarked slaves at Anomabu, and was reported off Grenada on her way to Jamaica, having come from Anomabu. Although the registers carried her with stale data for some years, her subsequent fate is currently unknown.

Year	Master	Owner	Trade	Source
1798	Fennan	Hueston	London–Africa	Lloyd's Register (LR)
1800	M.Finnan	T.Hughan	London–Africa	Register of Shipping
