= Emmanuel Owusu-Mainu =

Ghanaian politician

Hon. Emmanuel Owusu Mainu

Member of Parliament for Atebubu-Amantin Constituency
- In office 7 January 2009 – 6 January 2013
- President: John Atta Mills; John Mahama
- Succeeded by: Sanja Nanja

Member of Parliament for Atebubu-Amantin Constituency
- In office 7 January 2005 – 6 January 2009
- President: John Kufuor
- Preceded by: New constituency

Personal details
- Born: 3 September 1949 (age 77)
- Party: National Democratic Congress
- Children: 10
- Education: Akrokerri College of Education
- Profession: Educationist

Emmaunuel Owusu-Mainu (born 3 September 1949) is a Ghanaian educationist and politician. He was the member of parliament for the Atebubu-Amantin Constituency in the fourth and fifth Parliaments of the Fourth Republic of Ghana.

== Early life and work ==
Owusu-Mainu was born on 3 September 1949. His hometown is Amantin in the formerly Brong Ahafo Region and later Bono East Region of Ghana. Before his election into parliamentary position, he worked with the Ghana Education Service(GES) as an assistant director in-charge of Human Resource Development in the Atebubu District.

== Politics ==
Owusu-Mainu was elected in the 2004 parliamentary election held on 7 December 2004, on the ticket of the National Democratic Congress, as the Member of Parliament for the Atebubu-Amantin Constituency after it was newly created in 2003. He thus became part of the Members of Parliament elected for the Fourth Parliament of the Fourth Republic of Ghana. He won with 53.5% of total votes cast against Mumuni Ibrahim Mohammed of the New Patriotic Party, who got 41.3% of total votes cast and Amankwah Kokro - an independent candidate, gaining 5.2% of total votes cast. The National Democratic Congress won 10 parliamentary seats out of 24 parliamentary seats for the Brong Ahafo region in that elections. In total, the party won a minority representation in the 4th parliament of the 4th republic with 94 seats out of 230 total seats in that election of 2004.

He maintained his seat in the 2008 parliamentary election held on 7 December 2008 as the Member of Parliament of the same constituency for the Fifth Parliament of the Fourth Republic of Ghana. He won with 49.88% of total votes cast against Cassius Osei-Poku of the New Patriotic Party, who got 37.56% of total votes cast and Kwaku Tuah Osei - an independent candidate, gaining 12.57% of total votes cast. This was also on the ticket of the National Democratic Congress. He was succeeded by Sanja Nanja in the 2012 parliamentary election also of the National Democratic Congress for the Sixth Parliament of the Fourth Republic of Ghana. The National Democratic Congress won a majority representation in the 5th parliament of the 4th republic with 114 seats out of 230 total seats in that election of 2008.

== Personal life ==
Emmanuel Owusu-Mainu was married with ten children. He was a Christian and fellowships with the New Apostolic Church.

== Death ==
Owusu-Mainu died on 18 February 2014 at the 37 Military Hospital in Ghana.

Parliament of Ghana
Preceded by None	Member of Parliament for Atebubu-Amantin; 2005 – 2012
Political offices
Preceded by Emmanuel Owusu-Mainu	Succeeded by Sanja Nanja
