= Fort William, Ghana =

Cultural heritage site in Ghana

Fort William
- Part of British Gold Coast
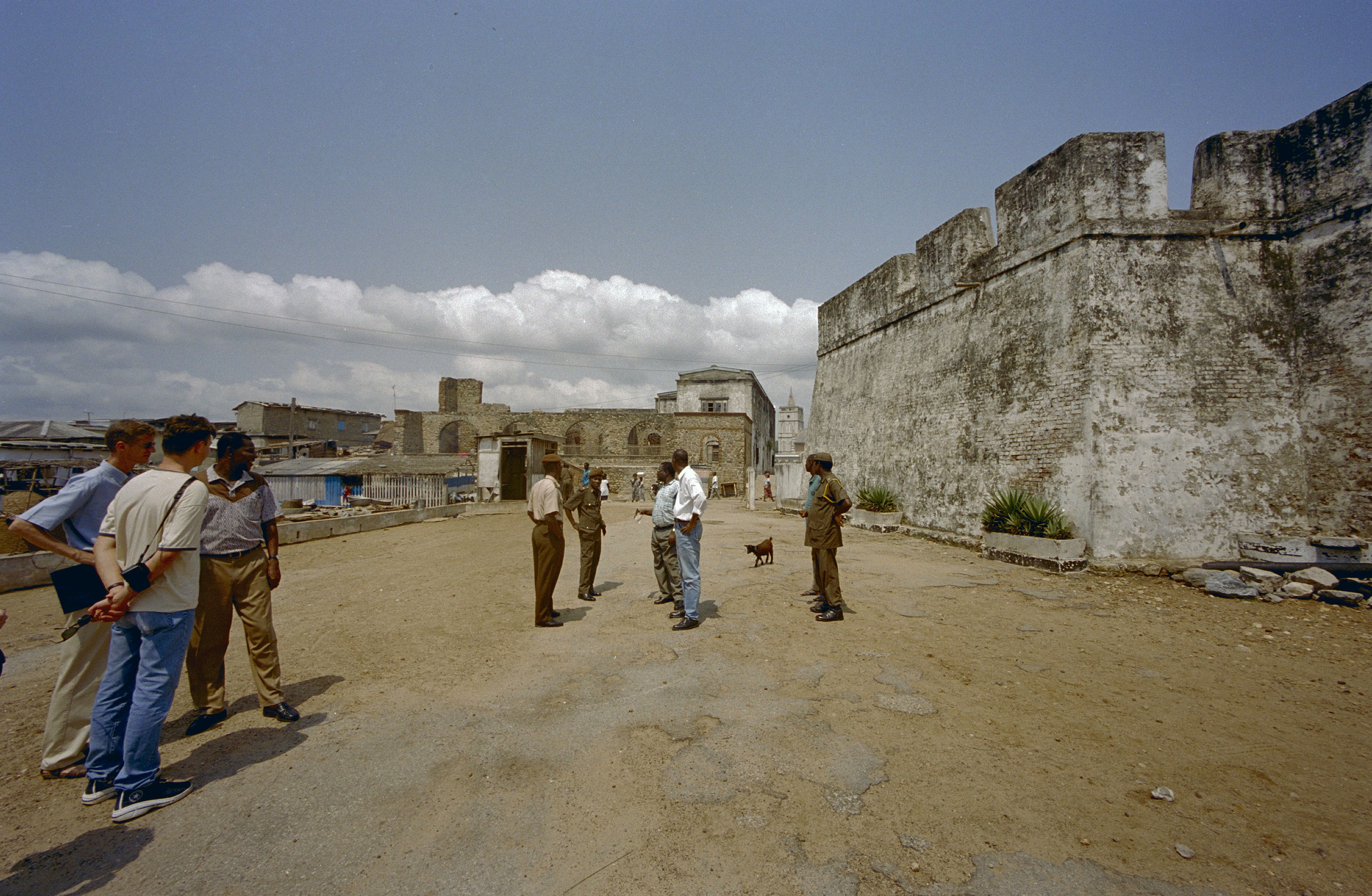
- Fort William

Location
- Location within Ghana
- Coordinates: 5°10′27″N 1°07′08″W

Site history
- Built: 1753

Garrison information
- Occupants: Britain (1753–1957)

Fort William is a fort in Anomabu, Central Region, Ghana, originally known as Fort Anomabo and renamed Fort William in the 1830s by its then-commander, Brodie Cruickshank, who added one storey to the main building, and renamed the fort after King William IV.

It was built in 1753 by the British after they thwarted a French attempt to establish a fort at the same place. Two earlier forts had been established at the same site, one in 1640 by the Dutch, another in 1674 (Fort Charles) by the English. Fort Charles was abandoned in 1730 and destroyed. Along with several other castles and forts in Ghana, Fort William was inscribed on the UNESCO World Heritage List in 1979 because of its importance during and testimony to the Atlantic slave trade.

== History ==
=== Earlier forts ===
In 1640, the Dutch built the first simple fort in the form of stone nogg and brick lodge under the direction of Commander, Arent Jacobsz van der Graeff. In 1653, the Swedes captured the lodge. In 1657, Danish forces took the lodge under Caerloff. In 1659 or 1660, the Dutch recaptured it. When the second Anglo-Dutch war ended in 1667 with the (Treaty of Breda), the English gained a foothold in Anomabo. In 1672 or 1673, the English began building Fort Charles, naming it after King Charles II of England, on the present-day location of Fort William. An early Anomabo chief, perhaps Eno or Eno Besi, inhabited the Dutch lodge at this time and declared it his palace. The fort was abandoned by the English not long after, in order to concentrate efforts and costs on Fort Carolusburg at Cape Coast.

=== "Ten Percenters" base ===
In 1698, the Royal African Company "licensed" ship captains not in its employment upon the payment of a 10% "affiliation fee" to enable them to trade in its areas of monopoly. There followed a flood of "Ten Percenters" trading at British forts, often outnumbering the company's own ships. Anomabo became a popular haunt of "ten percenters" (until their licensing was stopped in 1712), exporting vast numbers of slaves.

In 1717, the Dutch director-general at Elmina, Engelgraaf Roberts, quoting an English captain on Anomabo slave trade exports, stated: "From January 1702 to August 1708 they took to Barbados and Jamaica [from Anomabo] a total of not less than 30,141 slaves and in this figure are not included transactions made for other ships sailing to such Islands as Nevis, Montserrat, St. Christopher, for the South Sea Company, the New Netherlands and others which would increase the above number considerably, and of which Annemaboe alone could provide about one third."

=== Anomabo Castle, Fort William ===
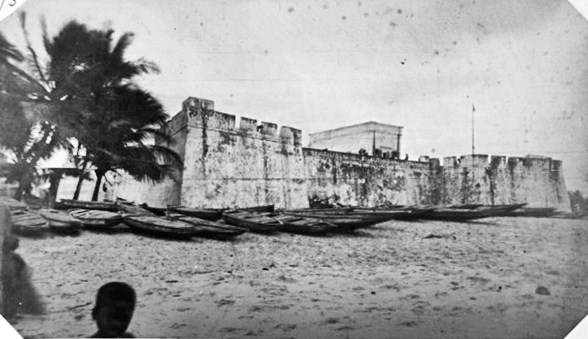
Fort William – 1890s

In 1753, after thwarting a French bid to establish a fort at Anomabo the British African Company of Merchants (successor to the Royal African Company) began construction of Anomabo Castle, designed by military engineer John Apperly, who became its first governor.

After Apperly's death in 1756, Irishman Richard Brew took over the governorship of this fort and completed its construction in 1760.

The fort became the center of British slave trading along the Gold Coast until the slave trade was outlawed in 1807.

In the nineteenth century, its commander Brodie Cruickshank added one storey to the main building and renamed the fort after King William IV (1830 – 1837).

Anomabo is a popular tourist destination. The well-preserved remains of Fort William can still be seen.

== Gallery ==
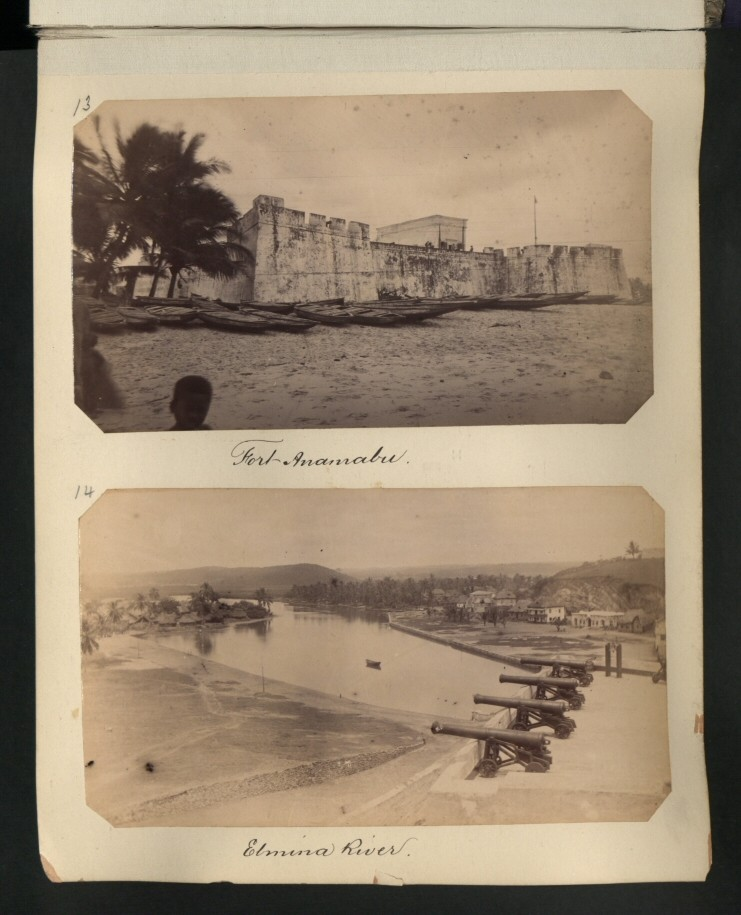
1870s

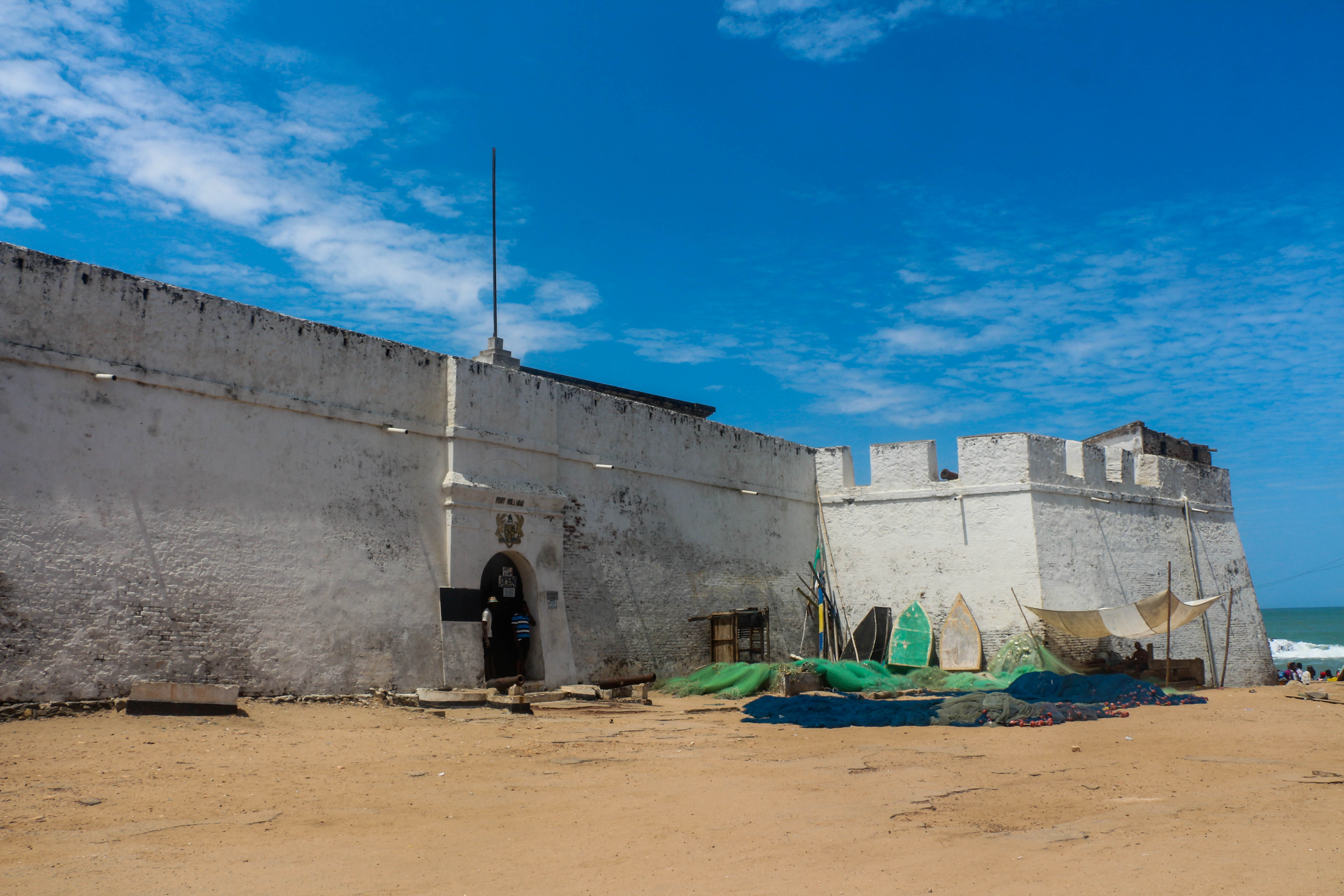
Fort William in Ghana

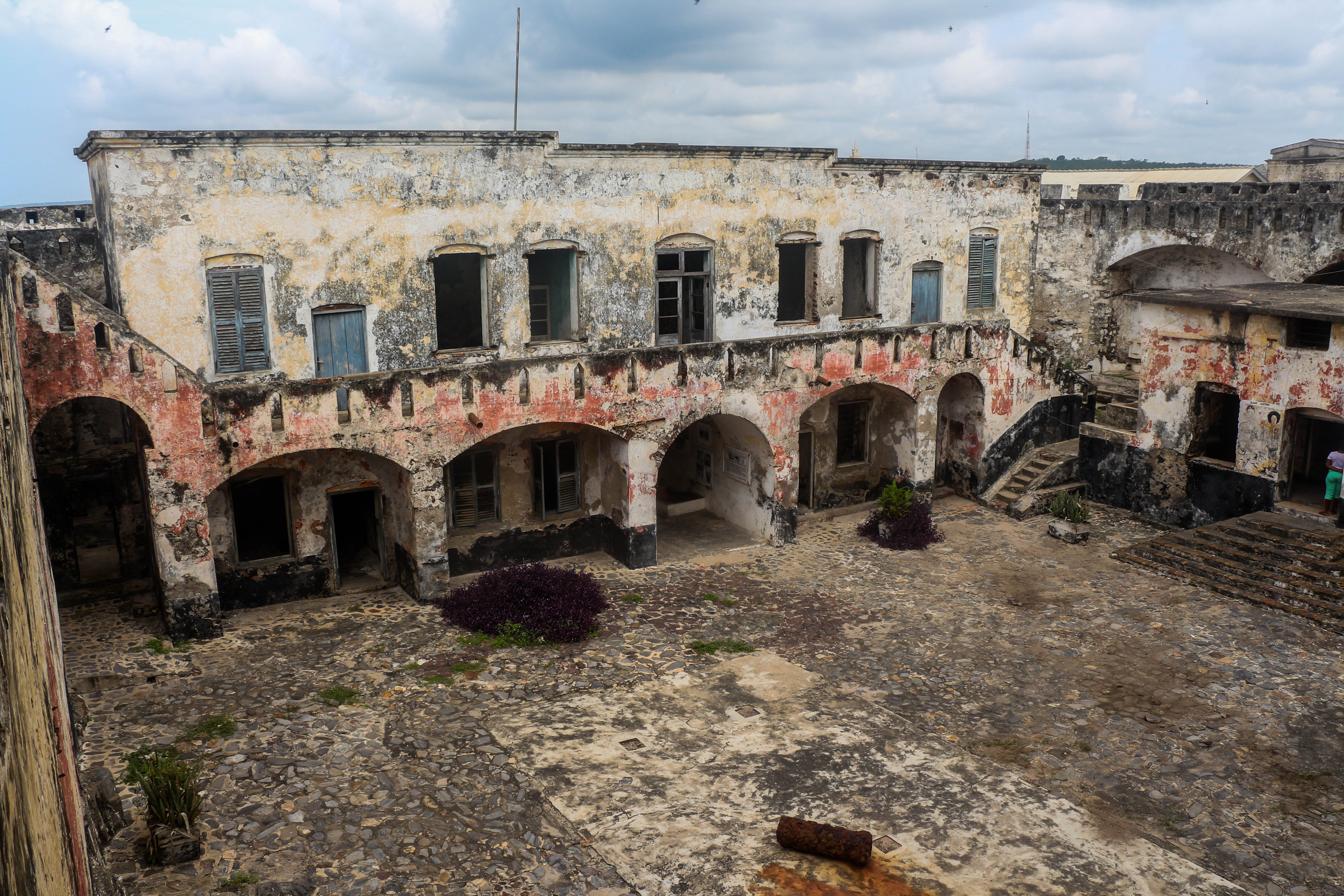
Fort William at Anomabo, Ghana

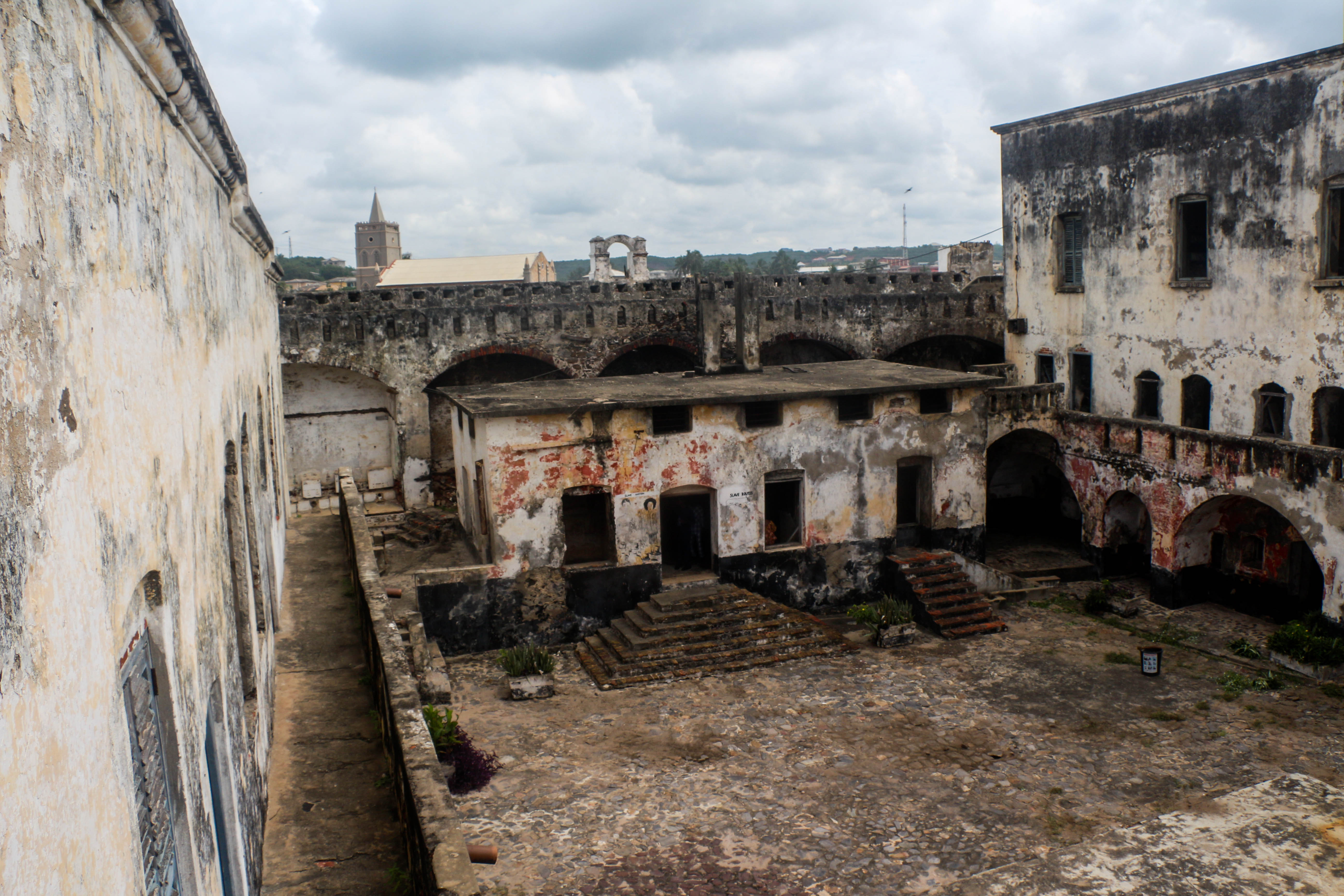
Fort William at Anomabo, Ghana

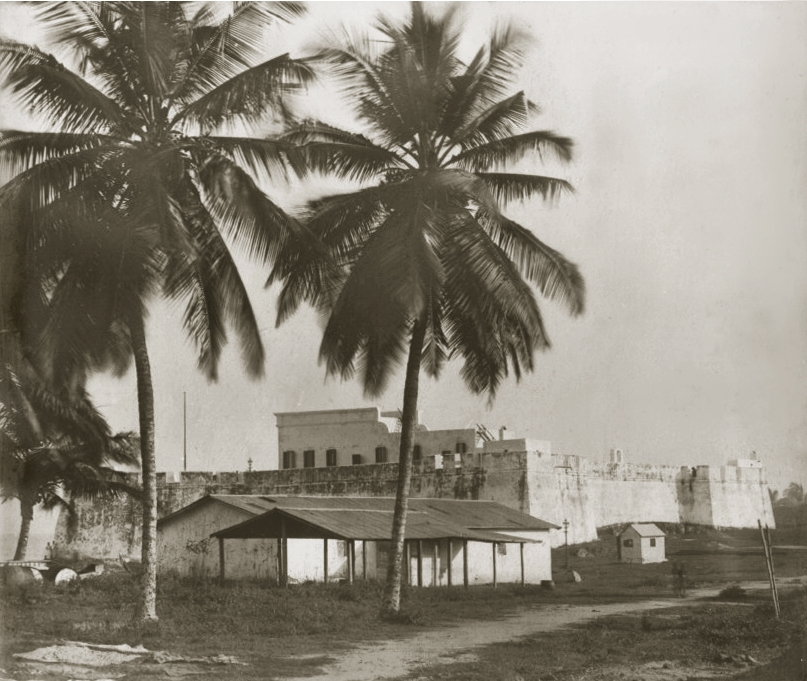
1890s

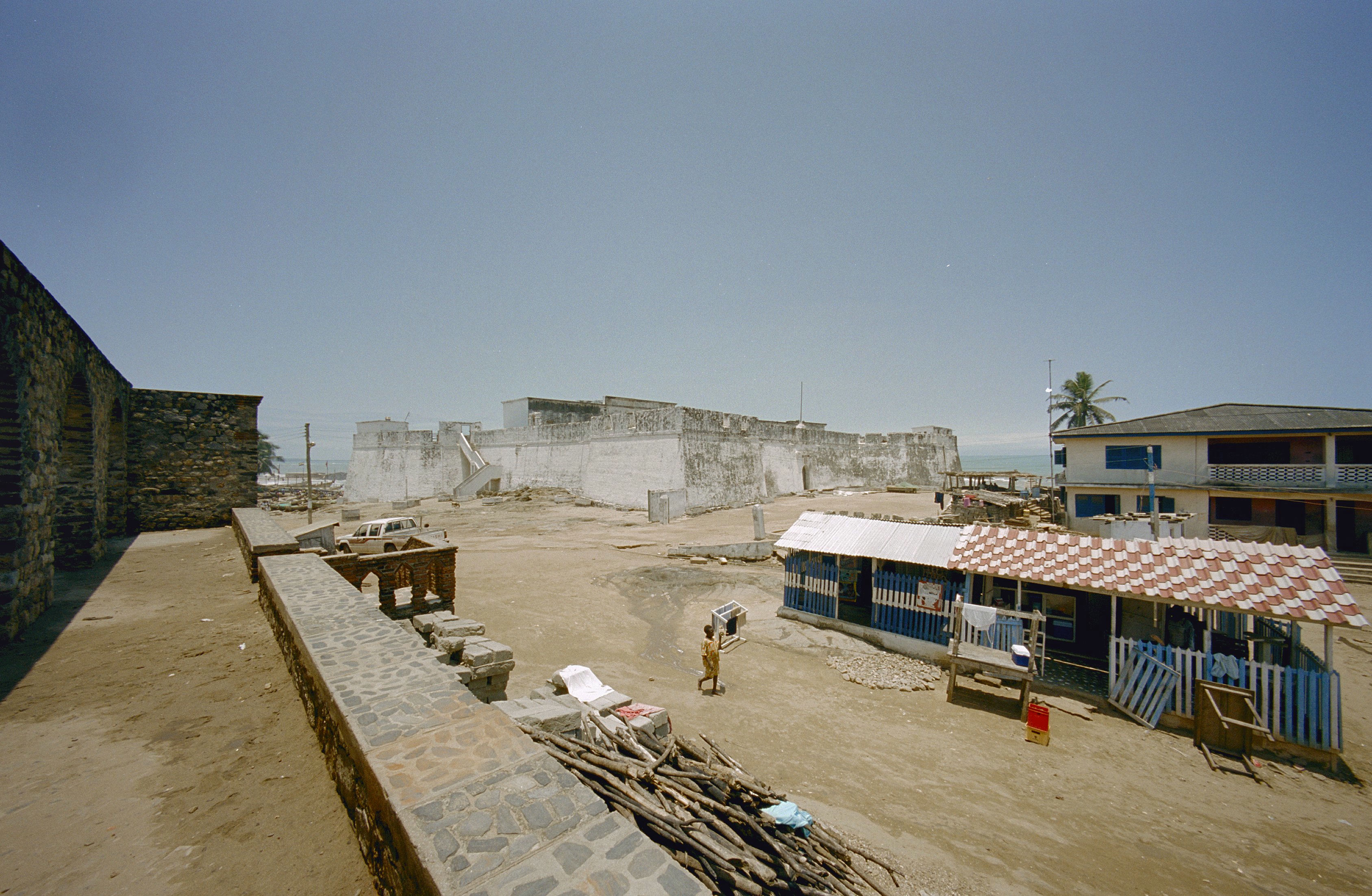

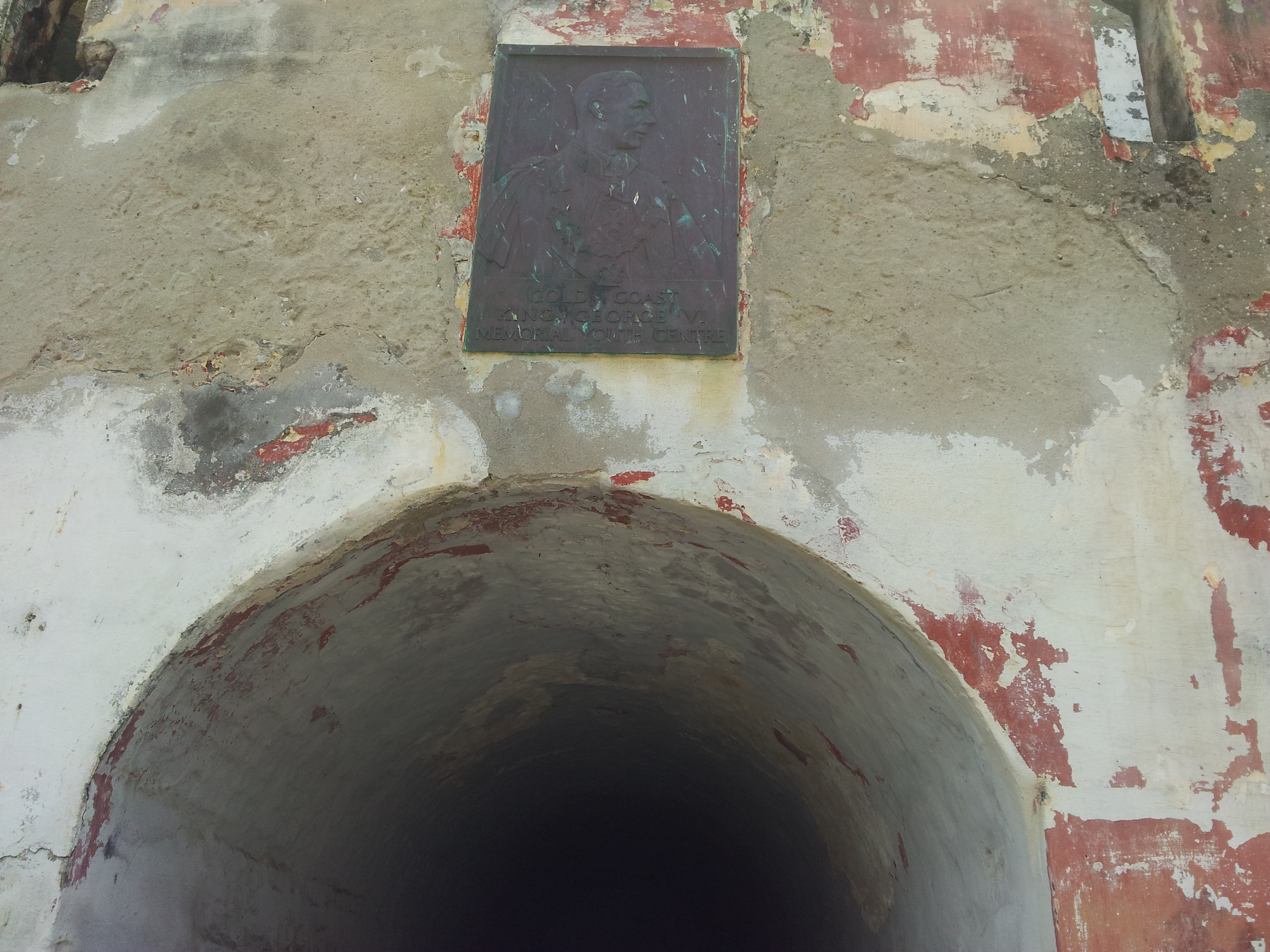
King George IV plaque

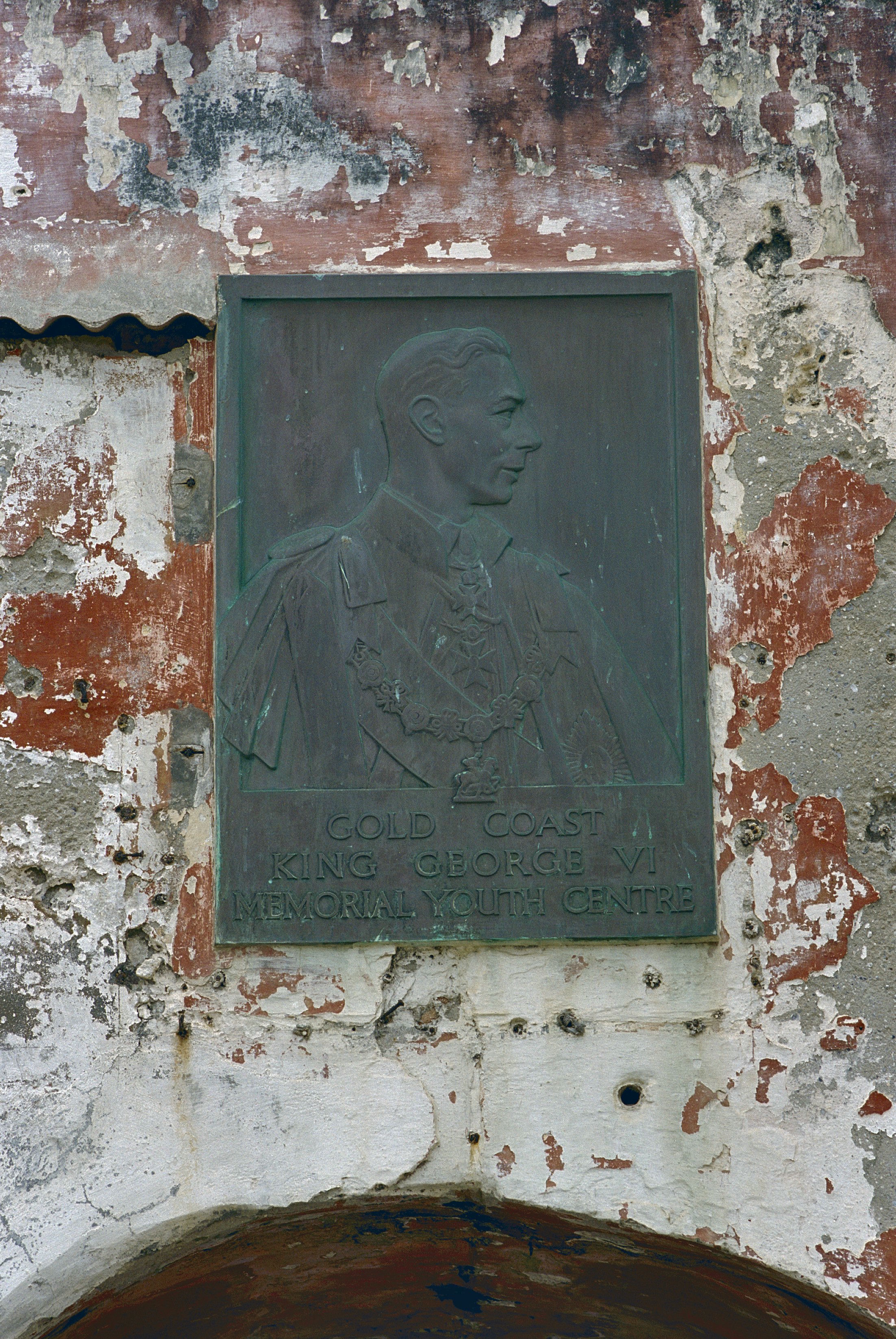
Gold Coast King George VI Memorial Youth Centre

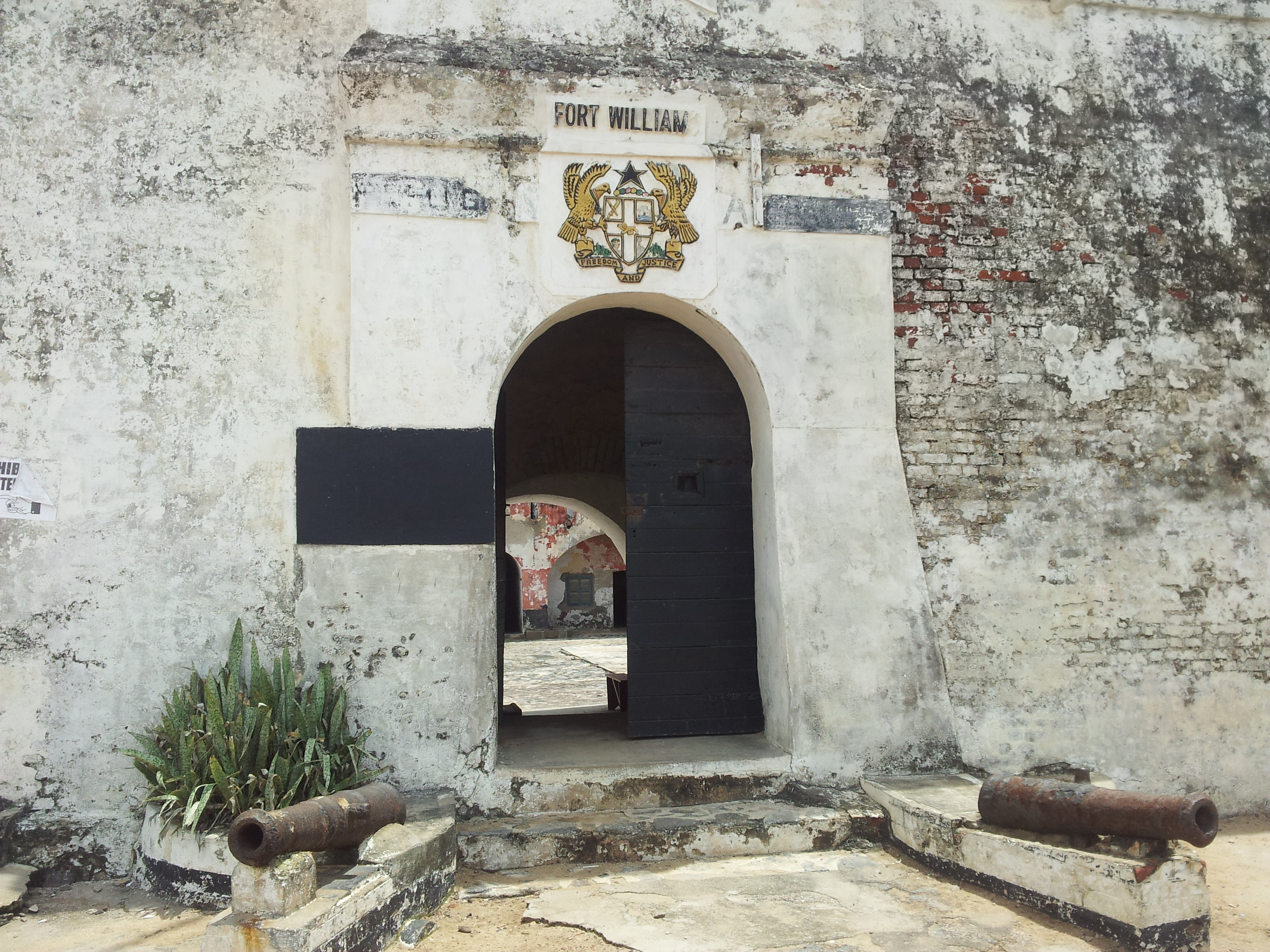
Fort William – Crest reads "Freedom and Justice"

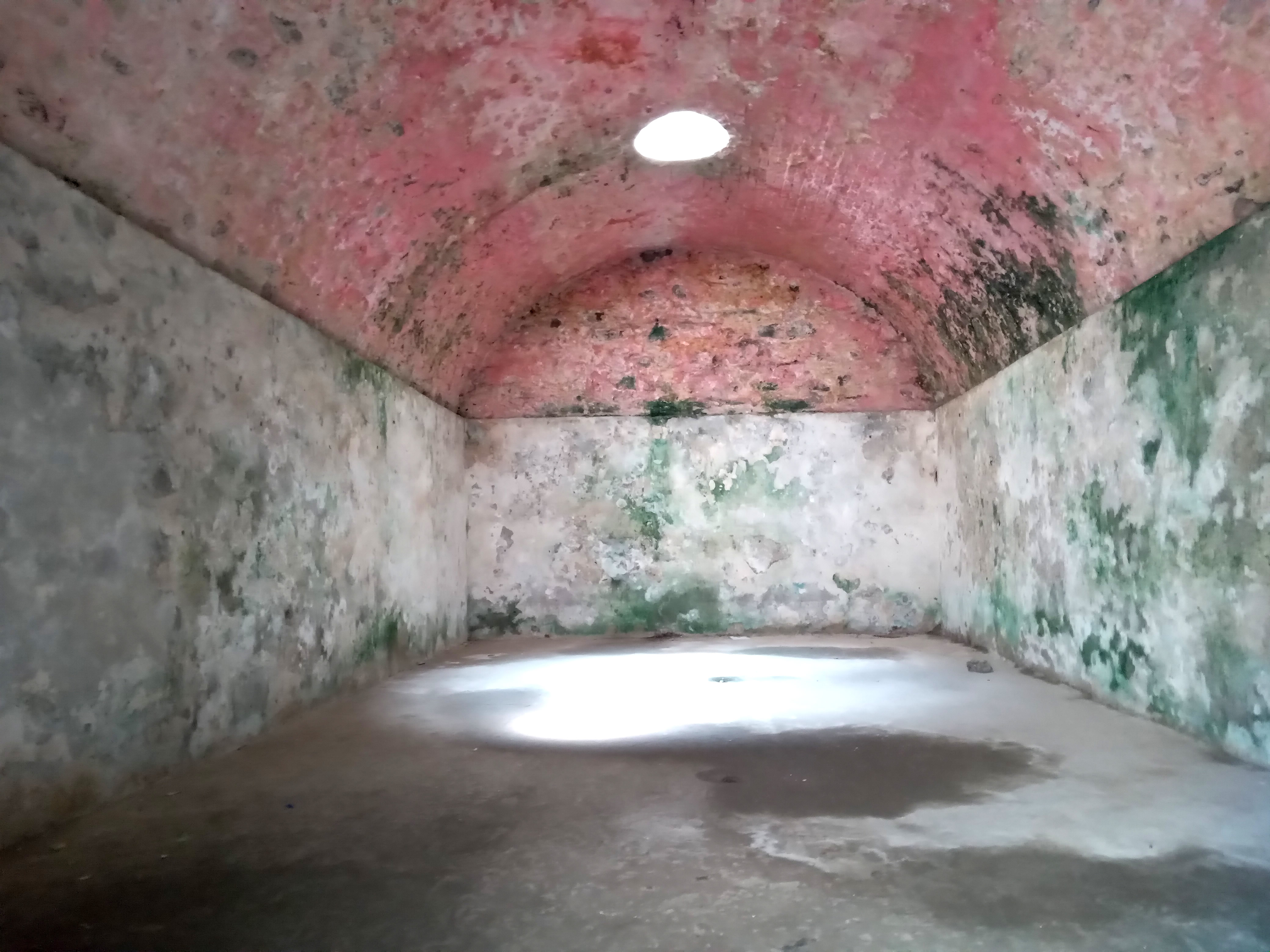
Prison cell at Fort William at Anomabo, Ghana

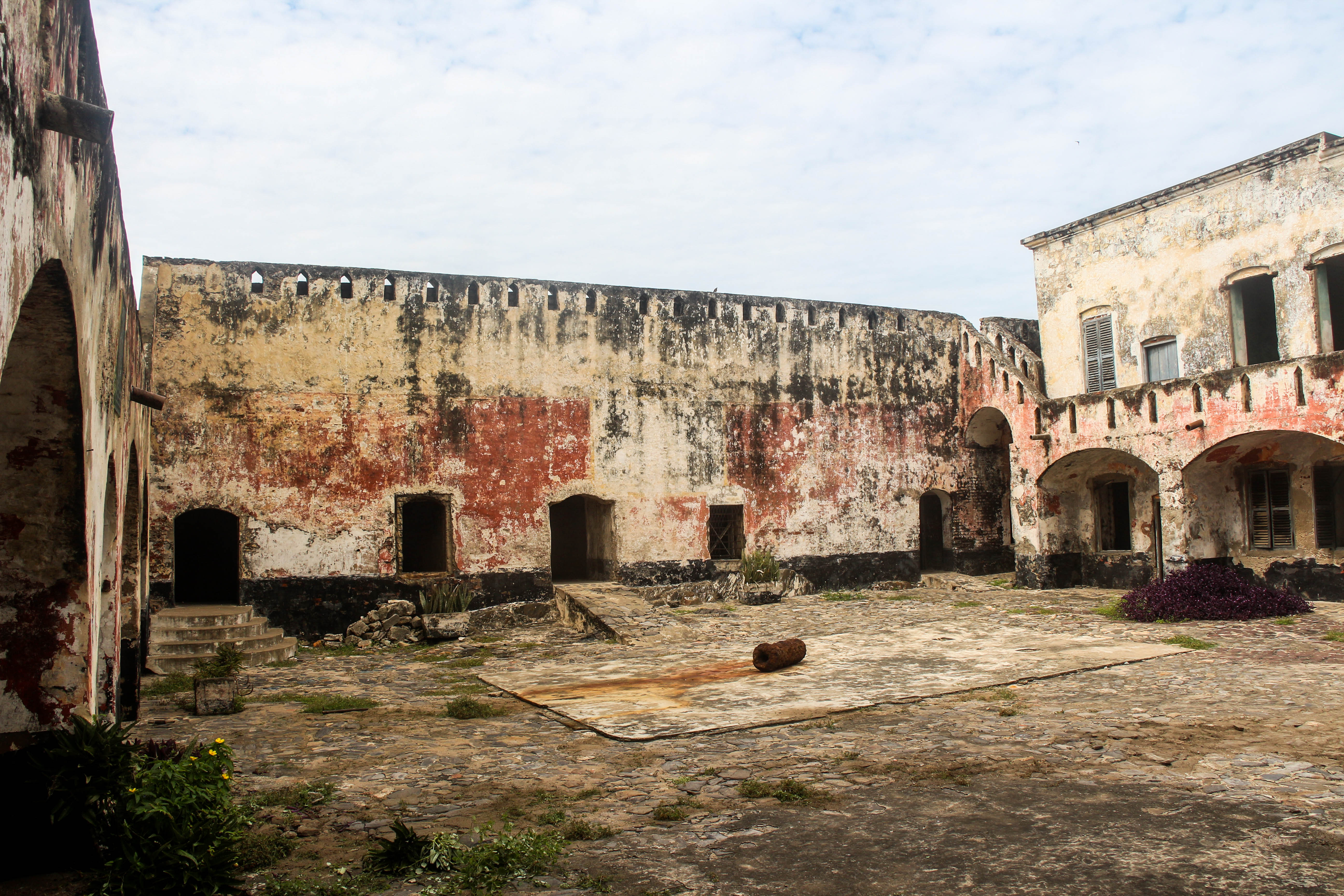
Fort William at Anomabo, Ghana

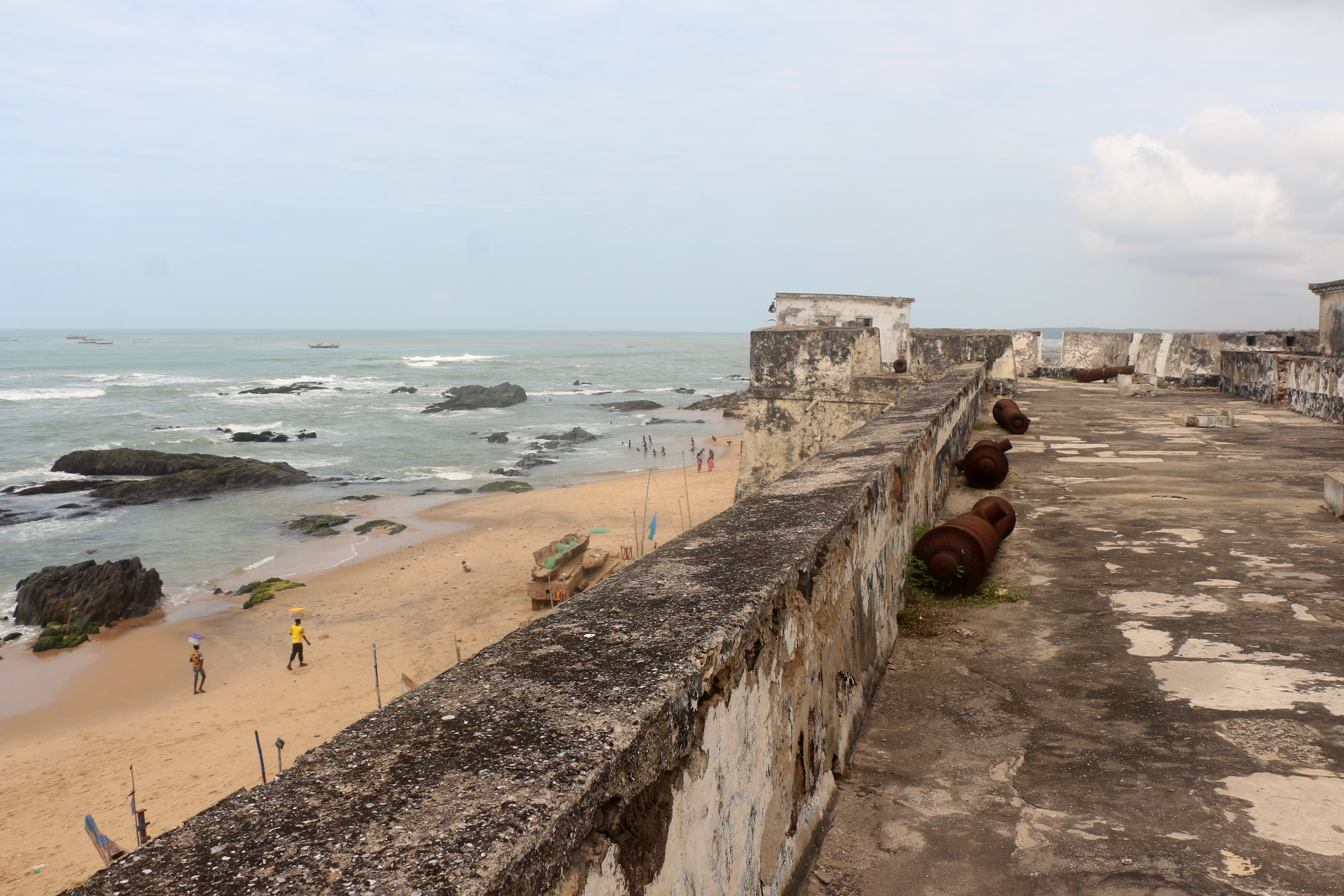
Fort William at Anomabo, Ghana

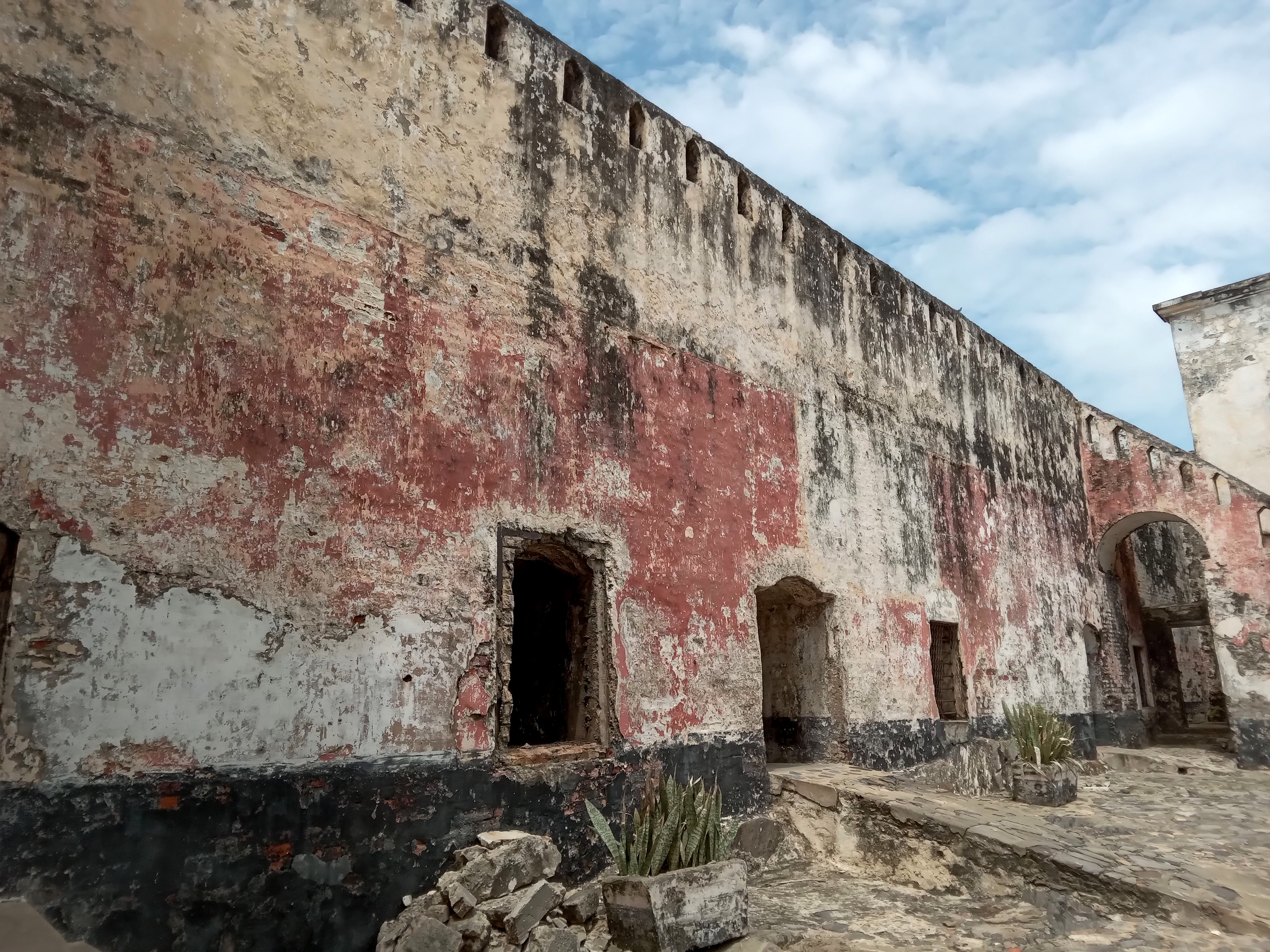
Fort William at Anomabo, Ghana

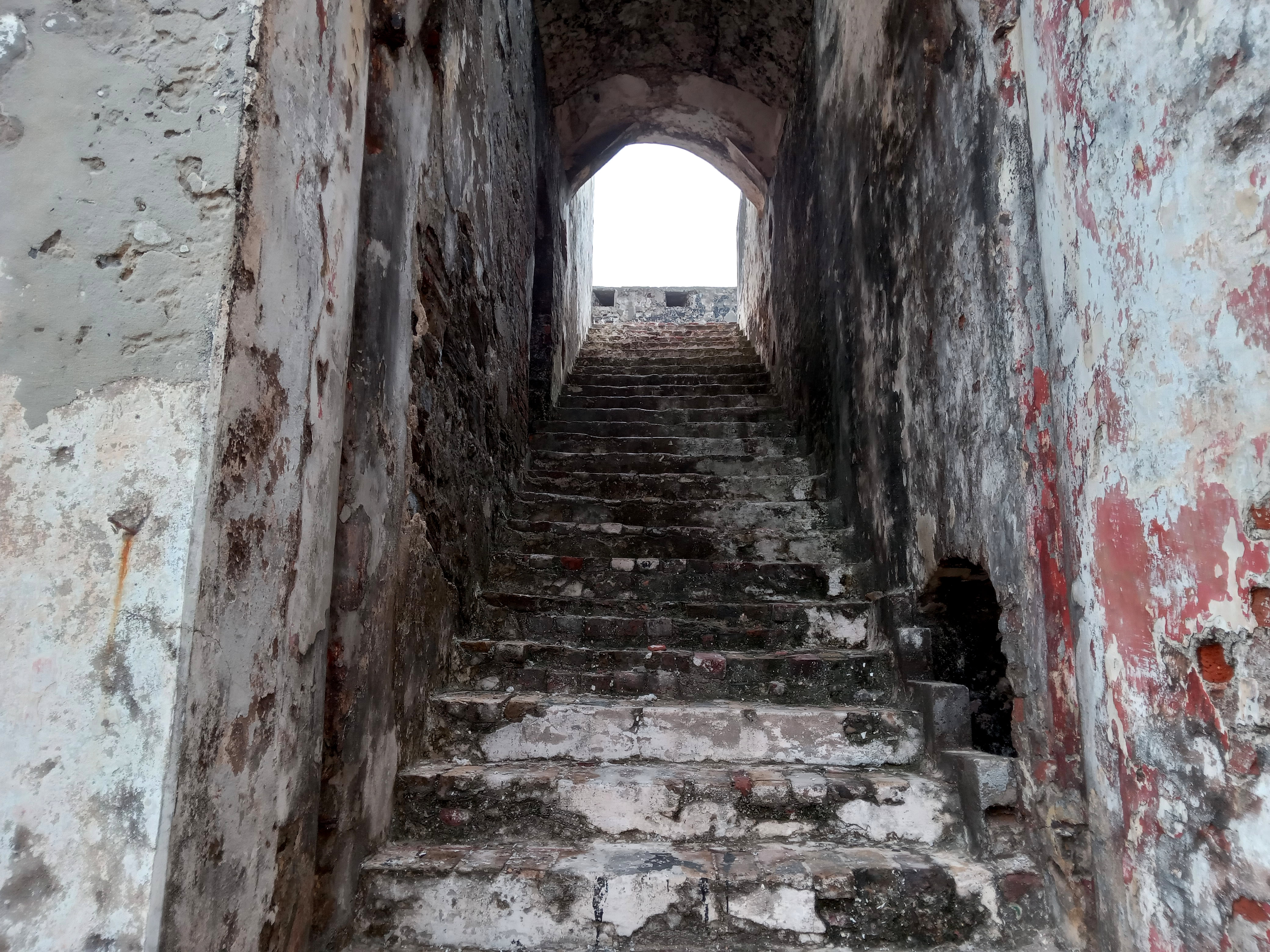
Fort William at Anomabo, Ghana

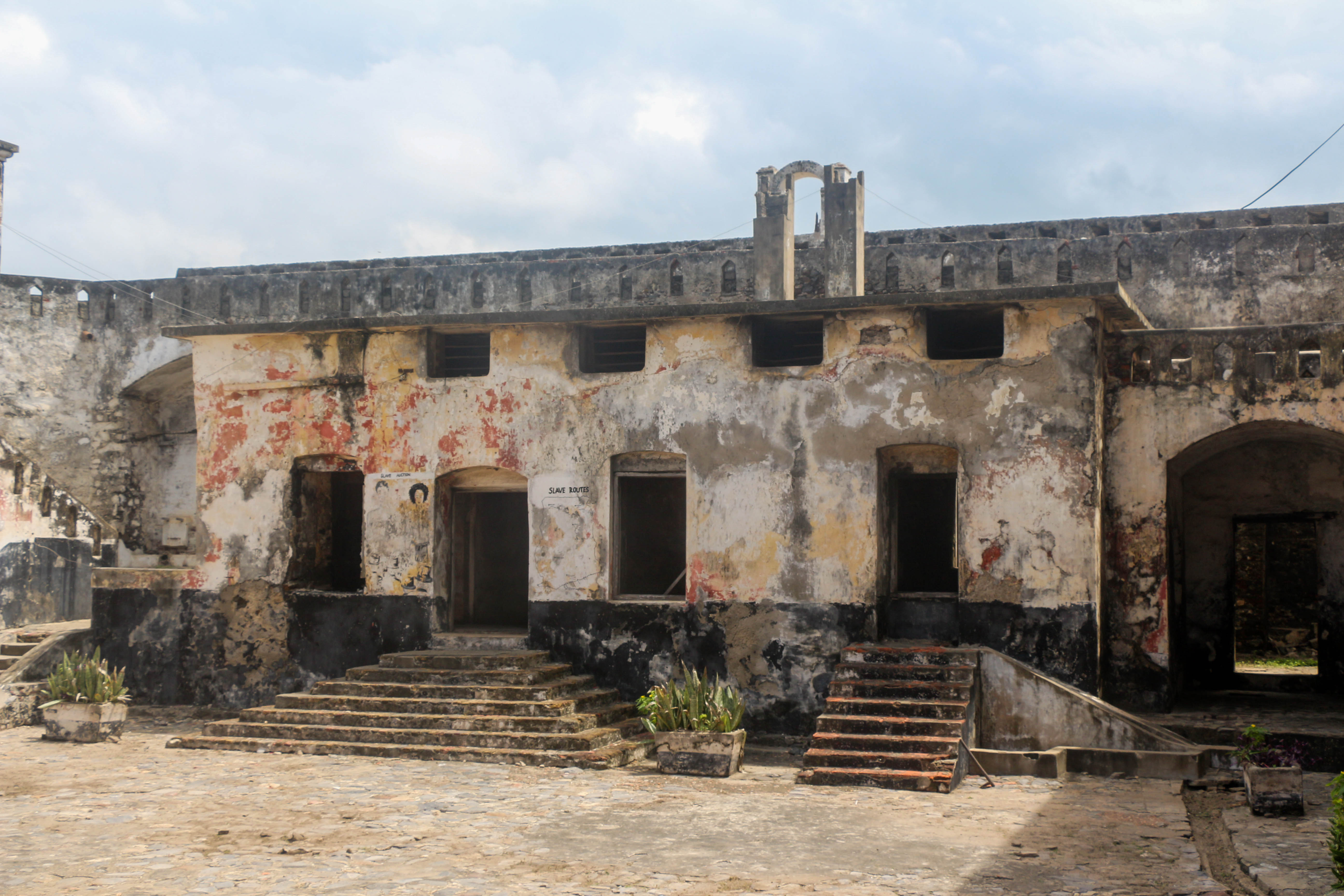
Fort William at Anomabo, Ghana

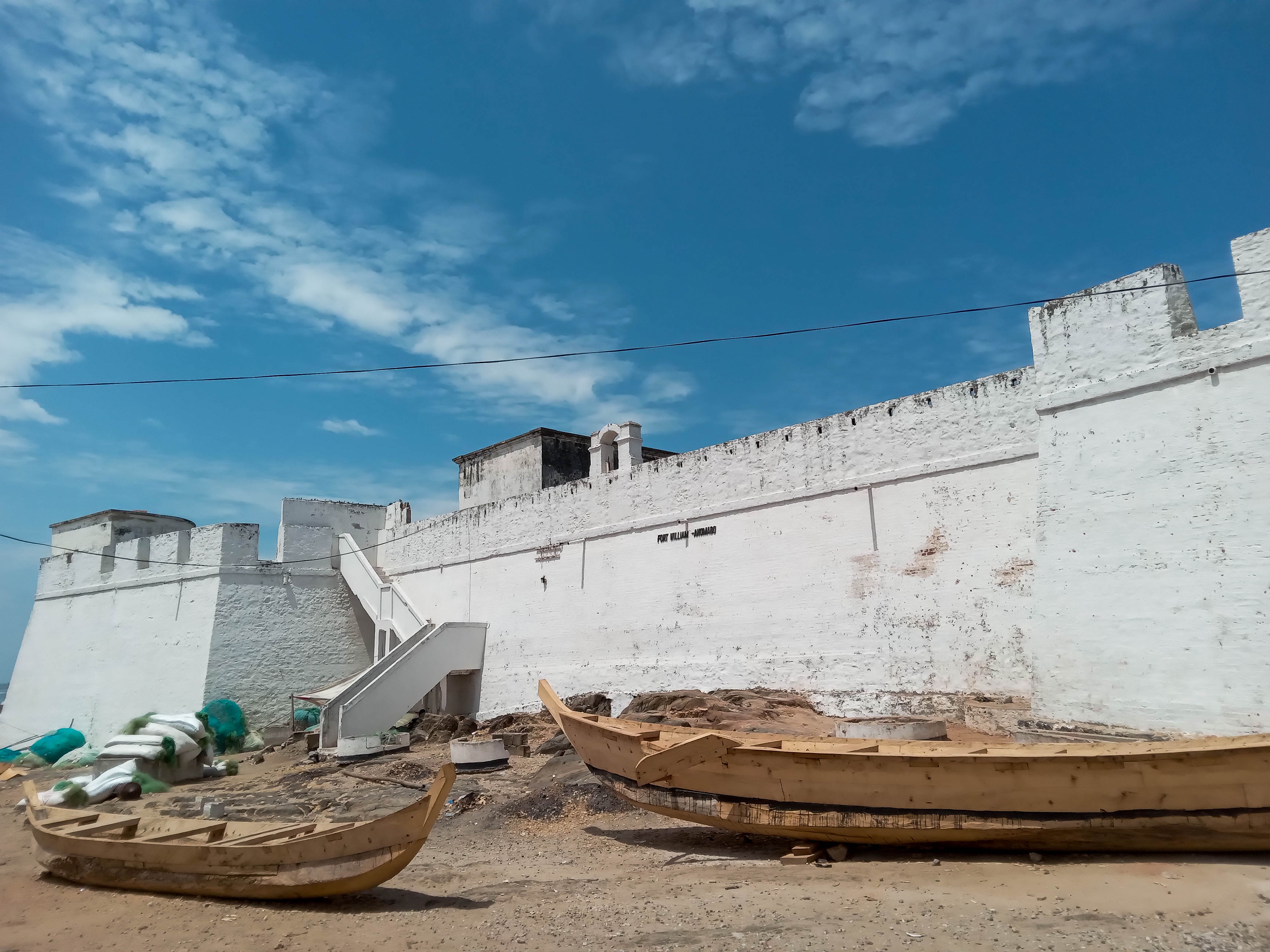
Fort William at Anomabo, Ghana

== Notable residents and prisoners ==
- Venture Smith
- William Ansah Sessarakoo
