= Pru West District =

- District
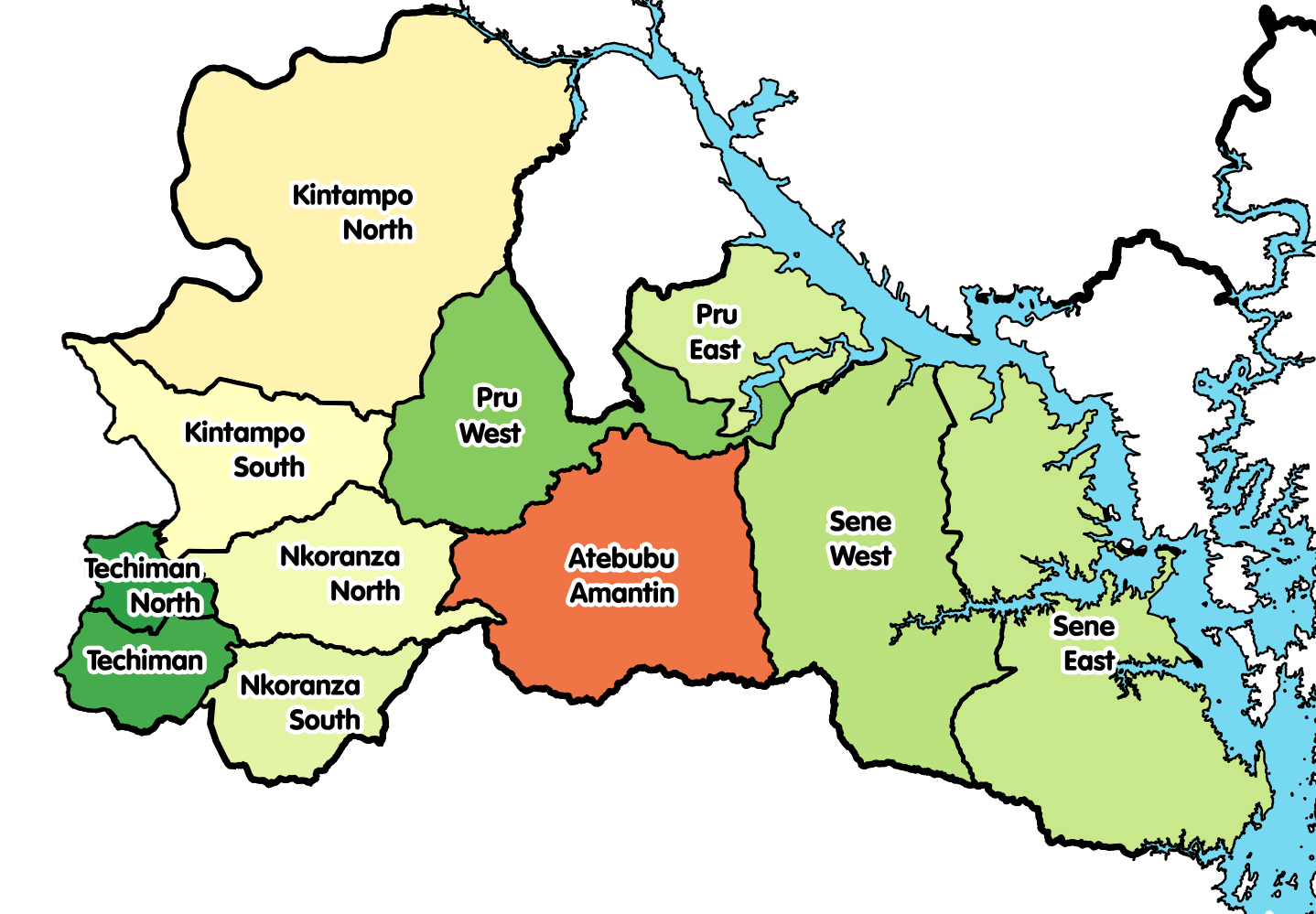
- Districts of the Bono East Region

- Location of Pru West District within Ghana
- Coordinates: 7.961°N 1.117°W
- Country: Ghana
- Region: Bono East
- Capital: Prang
- Created: March 15, 2018; 8 years ago

Government
  - District Executive: Stephen Jalulah
  - Coordinating Director: R. A. Acheampong

Area
  - Total: 2,090 km^{2} (810 sq mi)

Population (2021 (census))
  - Total: 69,383
  - Density: 33.19/km^{2} (86.0/sq mi)
- Time zone: UTC+0 (GMT)

Pru West District is one of the eleven districts in Bono East Region, Ghana. Formerly part of the Pru District, on 15 March 2018 it was split off to form its own district, with the remaining area being formed into the Pru East District. The district assembly is located in the east central part of Bono East Region. The capital town is Prang.

== Boundaries ==
The district is bounded on the north-east by the Pru East district, the Sene West district to the east, the Nkoranza South Municipal District and the Atebubu-Amantin Municipal District to the south, the Kintampo North Municipal District to the north-west, and the Kintampo South District to the west.

== Settlements ==
The ten most populated areas in the region include the capital town Prang, Zabrama, Dama-Nkwanta, Abease, Komfourkrom, Beposo, Buipe, Aboa, Adabrase and Ajalaja. There are 88 localities within the district. The district is also divided into the Prang Town Council, Abease Area Council and the Ajaraja/Beposo Area Council.

== Administration ==
The administrative head of the district is the District Chief Executive who is appointed by the President of Ghana after consultation.
