= Pru District =

- Former District
- Seal

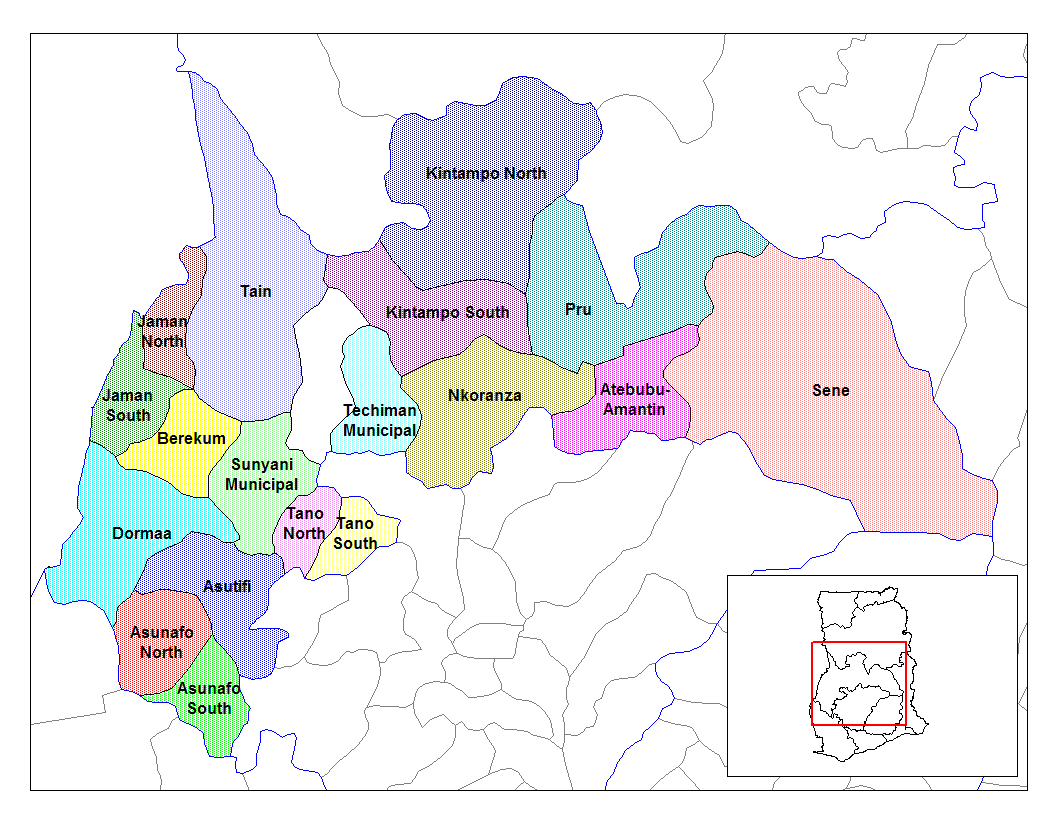
- Districts of Brong-Ahafo Region

- Location of Pru District within Brong-Ahafo
- Coordinates: 8°13′1.2″N 0°39′7.2″W
- Country: Ghana
- Region: Brong-Ahafo
- Capital: Yeji

Government
  - District Executive: Bekoe Benjamin

Area
  - Total: 4,407 km^{2} (1,702 sq mi)

Population (2012)
  - Total: —
- Time zone: UTC+0 (GMT)

Pru District is a former district that was located in Brong-Ahafo Region (now currently in Bono East Region), Ghana. Originally it was formerly part of the then-larger Atebubu District on 10 March 1989, until the northern part was split off to create Pru District; thus the remaining part has been renamed as Atebubu-Amantin District, which it was elevated to municipal district assembly status on 15 March 2018 to become Atebubu-Amantin Municipal District. However on 15 March 2018, it was split off into two new districts: Pru East District (capital: Yeji) and Pru West District (capital: Prang). The district assembly was located in the east central part of Brong-Ahafo Region (now east central part of Bono East Region) and had Yeji as its capital town.

== List of settlements ==
Settlements of Pru District
| No. | Settlement | Population | Population year |
| 1 | Abease | | |
| 2 | Akokoa | | |
| 3 | Bakamba | | |
| 4 | Cherembo | | TANOSO [C] |
| 5 | Dama-Nkwanta | | |
| 6 | Kamampa | | |
| 7 | Komfourkrom | | |
| 8 | Nyomoase | | |
| 9 | Parembo-Sawaba | | |
| 10 | Prang | | |
| 11 | Yeji | | |
| 12 | Zabrama | | |

== Sources ==
- "Pru District". Statoids.
- District: Pru
- 19 New Districts Created, 20 November 2003.
