= Joseph Kwasi Mensah =

Ghanaian politician

Hon Joseph Kwasi Mensah
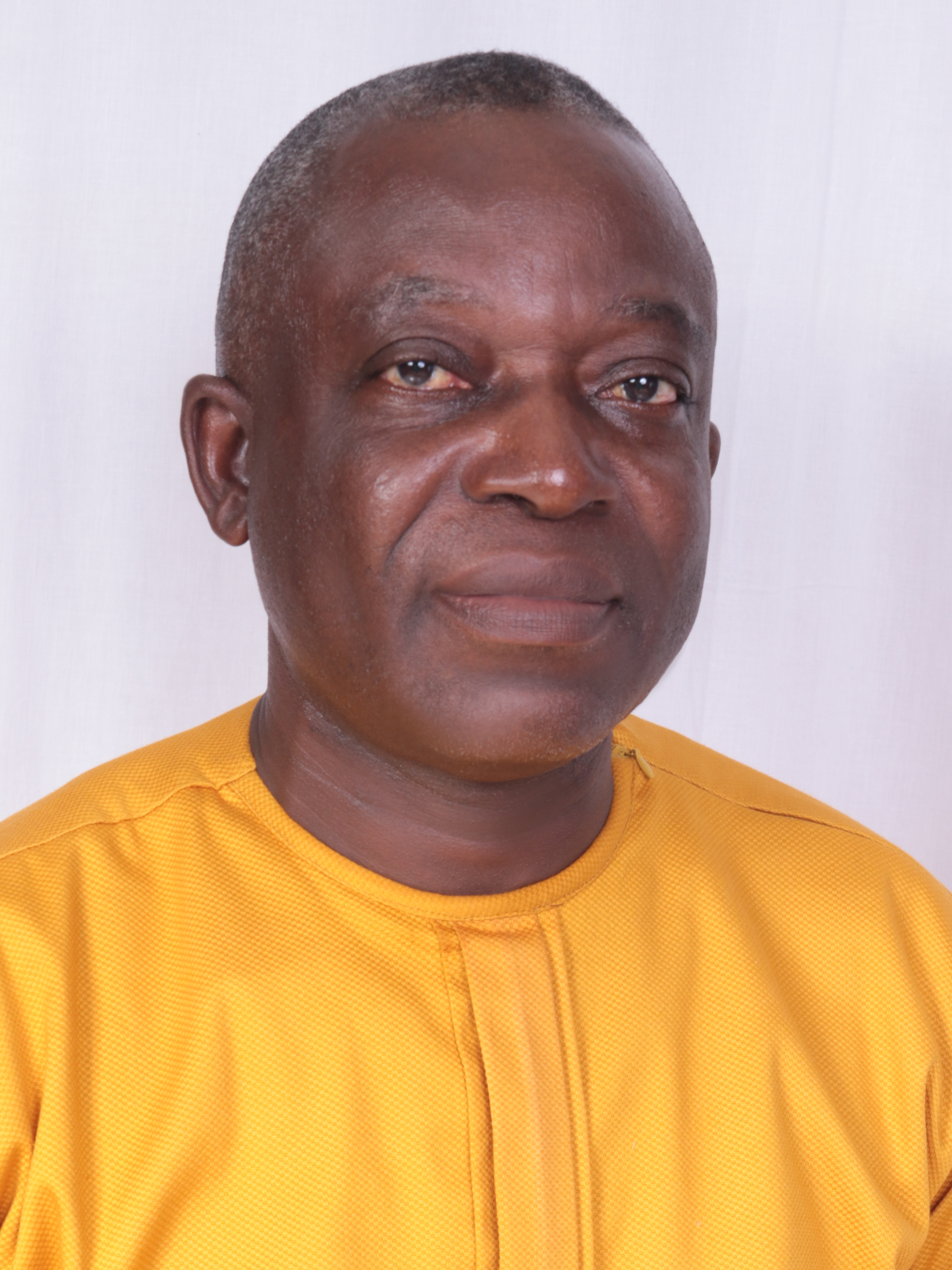

Member of the Ghana Parliament for Nkoranza North Constituency
- Incumbent
- Assumed office 7 January 2021

Personal details
- Born: Joseph Kwasi Mensah; 18 November 1962 (age 63) Manso
- Party: National Democratic Congress
- Occupation: Politician
- Committees: Members Holding Offices of Profit Committee, Constitutional, Legal and Parliamentary Affairs Committee

Joseph Kwasi Mensah (born 18 November 1962) is a Ghanaian politician who currently serves as the Member of Parliament for the Nkoranza North Constituency in the Bono East Region of Ghana. The member of parliament 9th

== Early life and education ==
Joseph Kwasi Mensah was born and hails from Manso in the Bono East Region of Ghana. Joseph Kwasi Mensah had and passed his Basic Education in 1975 which enabled him to obtain his Middle School Leaving Certificate(MSLC) in 1979, Ordinary Level (GCE O-Level) in 1989 and Advanced Level (GCE O-Level) in 1990. He then proceeded to have his Teacher Training in 1984, Diploma in Business Education (Accounting & Mathematics) in 1998, Bachelor of Education(B.Ed.) - (Accounting & Mathematics) in 2000.

== Career ==
Joseph Kwasi Mensah works as the Municipal Internal Auditor of Ghana Education Service in Nkoranza North Constituency in the Bono East Region of Ghana. Joseph Mensah is also working as the Member of Parliament (MP) for Nkoranza North Constituency in the Bono East Region of Ghana.

== Political life ==
Joseph Kwasi Mensah contested and won the NDC parliamentary primaries for Nkoranza North Constituency in the Bono East Region of Ghana. Joseph Kwasi Mensah won again in the 2020 Ghanaian general elections on the ticket of the National Democratic Congress with 15,124 votes (57.9%) to join the Eighth (8th) Parliament of the Fourth Republic of Ghana against Derrick Oduro (Major Rtd.) of the New Patriotic Party who had 10,978 votes (42.1%).

=== Committees ===
Joseph Kwasi Mensah is a committee member of the Members Holding Offices of Profit Committee and also a member of Constitutional, Legal and Parliamentary Affairs Committee of the Eighth (8th) Parliament of the Fourth Republic of Ghana.

== Personal life ==
Joseph Kwasi Mensah is a Christian

== Philanthropy ==
Joseph Kwasi Mensah donated furniture worth GHC75,000 to basic schools in his constituency (Nkoranza North Constituency) in the Bono East Region of Ghana. He again donated large quantity of medical equipment to District's Health Directorate in his constituency (Nkoranza North Constituency) in the Bono East Region of Ghana. Joseph Kwasi Mensah presented 50 bags of cement to Dromankese to be used for the construction of community's technical school in his constituency (Nkoranza North Constituency) in the Bono East Region of Ghana.
