= Amanten =

Coordinates: 7°33′N 1°12′W

- Interactive map of Amanten
- Country: Ghana
- Region: Bono East Region

Amanten is a town in the Bono East Region of Ghana. The town is known for the Amanten Secondary School.The school is a second cycle institution. It is under Atebubu-Amanten District. Farming is their major occupation. It comprises almost all the 46 ethnic tribes in Ghana. Their market day is on Friday. Catholic church is the dominant church in the town .
