= Sanja Nanja =

Ghanaian politician

Hon. Sanja Nanja
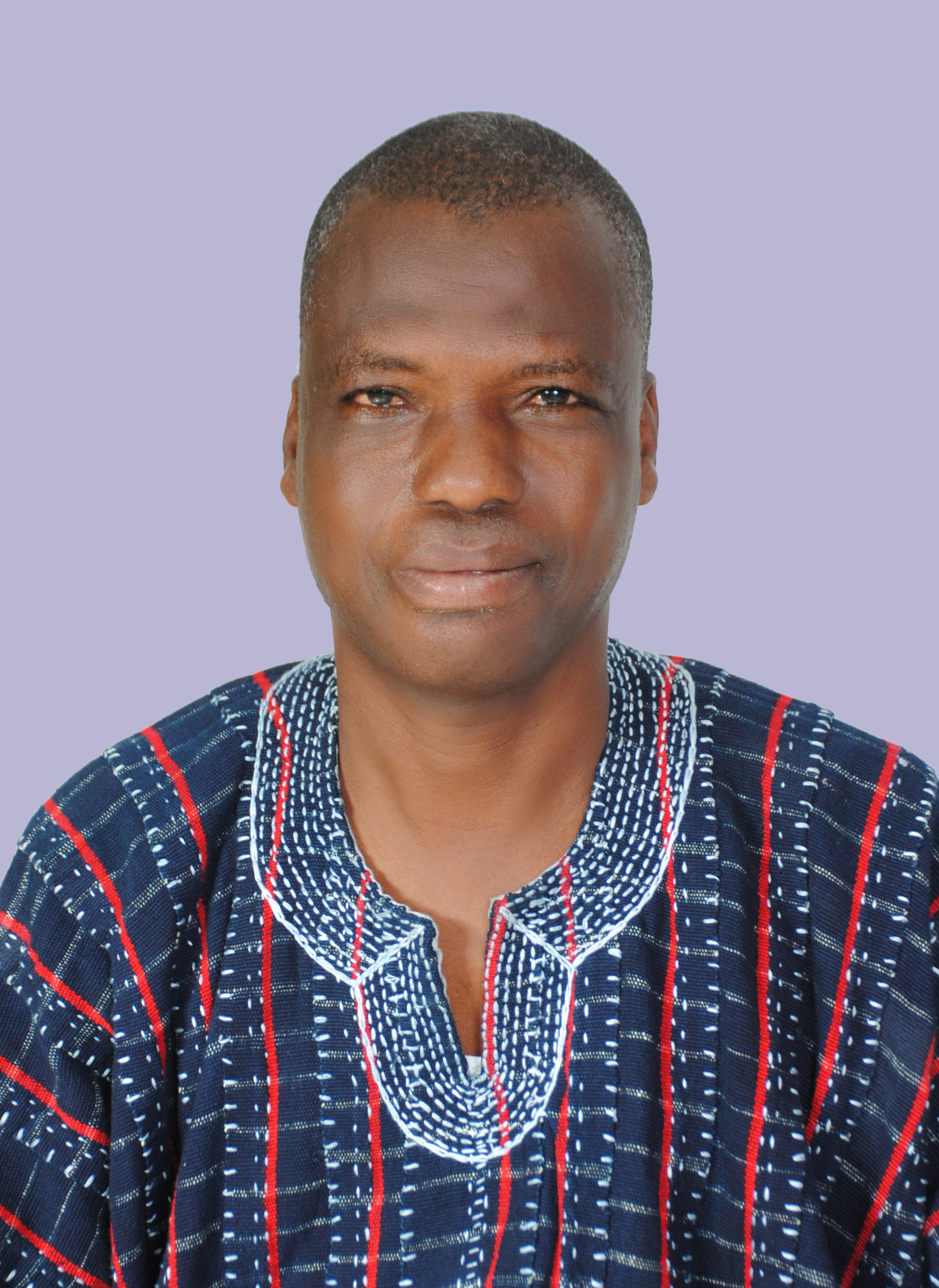

Member of Parliament for Atebubu Amantin Constituency
- Incumbent
- Assumed office 7 January 2021
- Preceded by: Kofi Amoakohene

Personal details
- Born: Sanja Nanja; 3 February 1968 (age 58) Atebubu, Ghana
- Party: National Democratic Congress (Ghana)
- Occupation: Politician
- Profession: Teacher

Sanja Nanja (born February 3, 1968) is a Ghanaian politician and member of the Eight Parliament of the Fourth Republic of Ghana representing the Atebubu Amantin Constituency in the Bono East Region on the ticket of the National Democratic Congress.

== Personal life ==
Nanja is a Christian (Assemblies of God). He is married (with five children).

== Early life and education ==
Nanja was born on February 3, 1968. He hails from Saboba, a town in the Northern Region of Ghana. He entered University of Ghana and obtained his Bachelor of Arts in Sociology and History in 2005.

== Politics ==
Nanja is a member of the National Democratic Congress (NDC). In 2012, he contested for the Atebubu Amantin seat on the ticket of the NDC sixth parliament of the fourth republic and won. He was elected with 16,964 votes out of the 34,411 total valid votes cast, equivalent to 49.30%. Nanja could not maintain his position as Member of Parliament for Attebubu Amantin during the 2016 elections due to a ban placed on him by members of the traditional council of his constituency. The ban was as a result of his conduct of insulting the queen mother of his constituency on radio.

=== 2024 Elections ===
He garnered 25,758 votes out of the 45,782 total votes cast defeating Abu Issa Bimmie Badoun of the New Patriotic Party who secured 18,977 votes at the 2024 general elections.

=== Committees ===
Nanja is a member of the Judiciary Committee and also a member of the Lands and Forestry Committee.

== Employment ==
- Ghana Education Service (teacher, Atebubu shs), Assistant Director 11
- District Chief Executive (DCE), (Atebubu District) May 7, 2009 - January 7, 2013
- Educationist
