= Anomabu =

Town in Central Region, Ghana

- Town
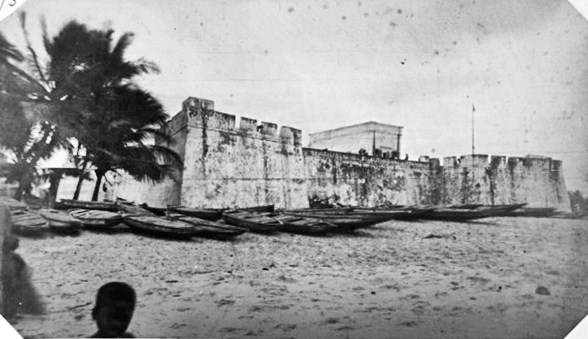
- Fort William in the 1870s

- Location of Anomabu in Central Region in Ghana
- Coordinates: 5°10′N 1°7′W
- Country: Ghana
- Region: Central Region
- District: Mfantsiman Municipal

Population (2013)
  - Total: 14,389
- Time zone: GMT
  - Summer (DST): GMT

Anomabu, also spelled Anomabo and formerly as Annamaboe, is a town on the coast of the Mfantsiman Municipal District of the Central Region of South Ghana. Anomabu has a settlement population of 14,389 people.

Anomabu is located 12 km east of Cape Coast in the central region of south Ghana. It is situated on the main road to Accra. The total area of Anomabu is 612 square kilometers, with boundaries of 21 kilometres along the coast, and 13 kilometres inland. The main language spoken in Anomabu is Fante.

According to oral tradition, the origin of the name “Anomabu” was first established when a hunter from the Nsona clan first discovered the area and decided to settle there with his family, eventually starting his own village as time passed. The hunter allegedly saw some birds atop a rock, and proclaimed the area “Obo noma,” which became the town's original name. Obanoma literally translates to “bird’s rock,” a name that slowly evolved into Anomabu over the years.

== History ==
Anomabu had long been a coastal trading center before it was established as a slave trading port, which caused the town to rise to prominence in the 17th century. The Fante merchants there traded primarily in gold and grain. After inviting the Dutch to build a factory in the town, the merchants turned increasingly towards the slave trade. Wealthy Fante merchants supported the building of an English fort to further this cause. However, the loss of the Royal African Company's monopoly in 1698 led to the closing of the fort in 1730. Under pressure from increasing French interest, the Company of Merchants Trading to Africa moved to rebuild the fort.

Anomabu Castle, renamed Fort William in the 1830s, was designed by the British engineer John Apperley and constructed between 1753 and 1760. At the time it was considered to be the strongest fortification on the coast. It is about 16 kilometers (10 mi) from Cape Coast Castle. After Apperley's death in 1756, Anglo-Irishman Richard Brew took over the Governorship of the fort and continued its construction. The Anomabu fort became the center of British involvement in the Atlantic slave trade along the Gold Coast until it was abolished in 1807. Though lack of evidence makes it difficult to say with absolute certainty, it is thought that the majority of the captive people sold into slavery at Anomabu were likely to have come from the Ashanti and southern Akan people.

According to a survey and analysis of village settlement patterns in Anomabu done by James Sanders in the 1960s, the distribution of villages in Anomabu have remained relatively constant since the mid to late 19th century. As Anomabu declined in its role as a trading post of slaves, so did its population - fewer settlements were established in Anomabu and the areas inland of it, and as a result, the villages from that point until the present have remained relatively unchanged.

Since the fabric of Anomabu's commercial society was so dependent on the institution of slavery up to that point, Anomabu post 1807 declined significantly in its power as an economic commercial space. In the same year, a small garrison successfully resisted the entire Ashanti army, although the city suffered greatly from the attack. The attack resulted in over 8,000 casualties of Anomabu people.

In the later 19th century, it exported in palm oil, ivory, gold dust, peanuts, and Guinea grains in exchange for considerable imports of manufactured goods. Its population in the 1870s was around 4500.

Originally a small fishing village, Anomabu eventually became one of the most important trading ports on the Gold Coast. By the 18th century, the town had become one of the largest exporters of slaves on the West Coast of Africa. According to 19th century colonial official George Macdonald, Anomabu was “The strongest [town] on the coast on account of the number of armed natives that it contained: The whole land round was well populated besides being very rich in gold, slaves, and corn”. Not just slaves, but the plentiful maize corn was another reason that the Fante region and Anomabu specifically was so desirable to slave traders.

In 1798, people who would be enslaved were embarked on the Antelope ship which had come from London.

== Importance of Fishing in modern day Anomabu ==
The main occupation of Anomabu inhabitants is fishing, with farming being the second most popular occupation. Other occupations in Anomabu include trading, as well as various artisanal jobs such as making pottery, carpentry, or plumbing. Many Anomabu residents take up other jobs when the fishing season is not generative enough to make a living.

According to an anthropological study in 2016 by Patience Affua Addo, the fishing industry in Anomabu is highly gendered and prevents ascension for women due to the patriarchal society that it exists under. However, in recent years, women of Anomabu have risen in power in the fishing market.

Though the women of Anomabu do not take part in fishing themselves, they are vital to the market and engage in the majority of the trading of fish itself. Though the current patriarchal formation of Anomabu society places men at the forefront of the fishing industry, women have begun to rise to prominence in the context of fishing in recent years. In 1992, women owned 100 out of the 400 total fishing canoes in Anomabu. This number remained steady in 2002, when 38% of canoes in Anomabu were also reportedly owned by women. The advent of owning a canoe provides women both respect and status in their family and the community at large.

== Tourism ==
In modern times, Anomabu is a popular tourist destination. The remains of Fort William are still visible.

== Festivals ==
The people of Anomabo celebrate the Okyir festival which is a week-long annual festival celebrated in the second week in the month of October. "Okyir" means "abomination" and the people celebrate this festival as a reminder of society's social vices.

== Education ==
There are 3 public junior highs and 4 private junior highs in Anomabu, and one senior high school.

== Electricity and Sanitation ==
Electricity in Anomabu comes from the national grid and pipe borne water. Sanitation is not adequate in the community, and due to lack of public toilets, most residents use the beach, which has resulted in contaminated gutters.

== Notable residents natives ==
- William Ansah Sessarakoo (c. 1736–1770)
- Prince Whipple (1750–1796)
- John Mensah Sarbah (1864-1910)
- G. E. Ferguson (1864-1910)
- James Emman Kwegyir Aggrey (1875-1927)
