= Prang, Ghana =

District capital in Ghana

Coordinates: 7°59′32″N 0°53′00″W

Prang is a town and a capital of the Pru West District, a district in the Bono East Region of Ghana. Most people in the town are a farmers and traders.

== Education ==
Prang Senior High School, a second-cycle institution is in the town.
