= Atebubu-Amantin Municipal District =

Municipal district in Bono East Region, Ghana

- Municipal District
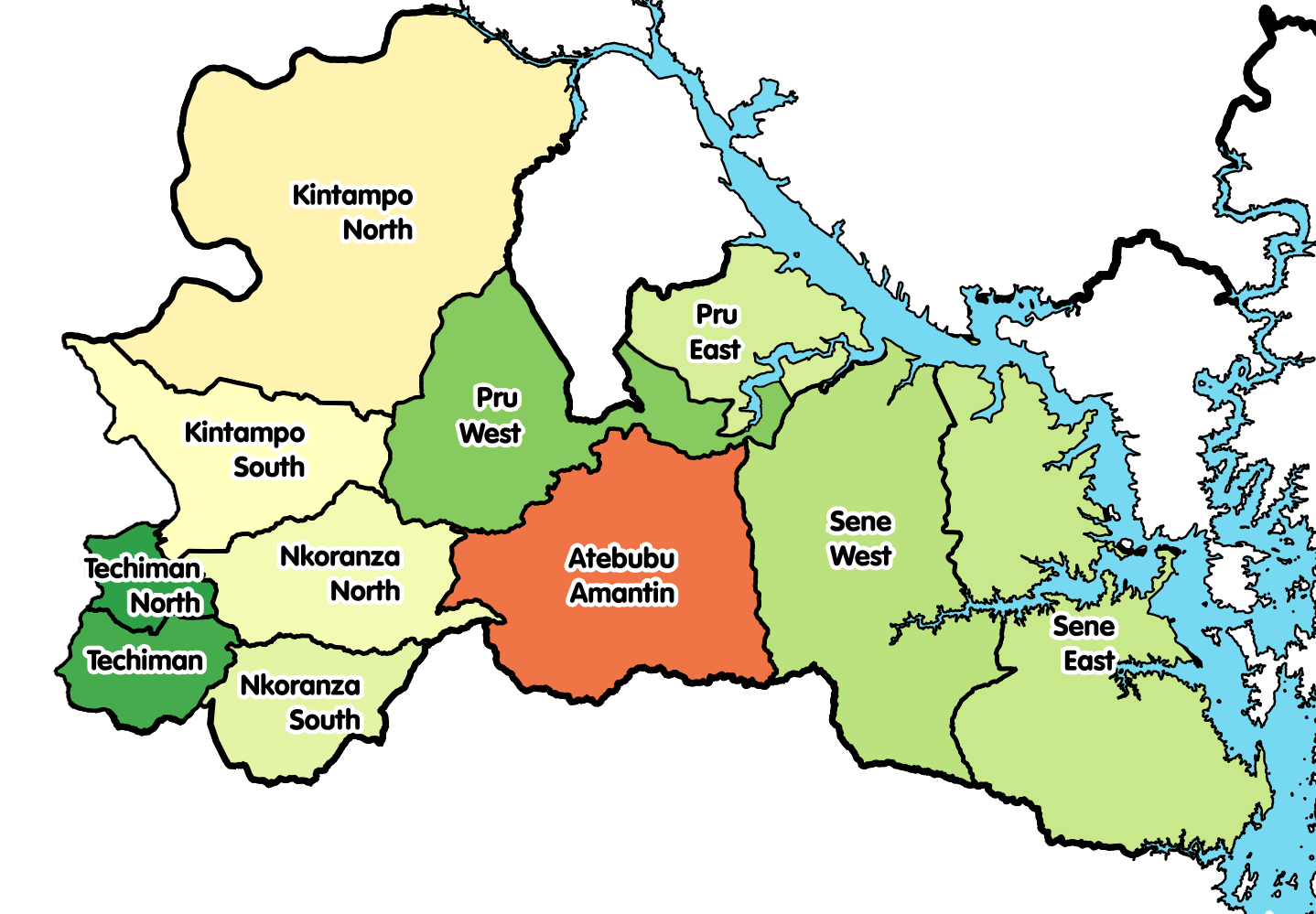
- Districts of Bono East Region

- Location of Atebubu-Amantin Municipal District within Bono East Region
- Coordinates: 7°38′N 1°4′W
- Country: Ghana
- Region: Bono East Region
- Capital: Atebubu

Government
  - Municipal Chief Executive: Edward Owusu

Population (2021 Census)
  - Total: 144,947
  - Ethnicity: Akan people
- Time zone: UTC+0 (GMT)

Atebubu-Amantin Municipal District is one of the eleven districts in Bono East Region, Ghana. Originally it was formerly part of the then-larger Atebubu District on 10 March 1989, until the northern part of the district was split off to create Pru District on 12 November 2003 (effectively 18 February 2004); thus the remaining part has been renamed as Atebubu-Amantin District, which it was later elevated to municipal district assembly status on 15 March 2018 to become Atebubu-Amantin Municipal District. The municipality is located in the east central part of Bono East Region and has Atebubu as its capital town.

== District Substructure ==
As of 2018, the district comprises eight (8) zonal councils. These were: Atebubu, Amantin, New Konkrompe, Jato Zongo, Akokoa, Nyomoase, Kumfia/Fakwasi and Garadima.

== Population ==
According to the 2010 population and housing census of Ghana the population of the Atebubu-Amantin District was 105,938. 50.7% of the population was of male and females made up 49.3% of the population. Majority of the population reside in the two principal towns of Atebubu and Amantin.

== List of settlements ==
Settlements of Atebubu-Amantin District
No.	Settlement	Population	Population year
1	Abuo		
2	Ahonto		
3	Akokoa		
4	Asempaneye		
5	Atebubu		
6	Dobidi Nkwanta		
7	Bresoano		
8	Dentenso		
9	Fante New Town		
10	Forty-four		
11	Garadima		
12	Lailai		
13	Masuo		
14	Mem		
15	Mempeasem Boniafo		
16	New Kronkrompe		
17	Nkwanta		
18	Nyomoase		
19	Old Kronkrompe		
20	Sawankyi-Afrefreso		
21	Seneso		
22	Tintale		
23	primukyea		
24	Watro		
25	Yawbraso		
26	Yawtuffour		

Amantin, Jato Zongo, Kumfia, Fakwasi, Abamba

== Sources ==
- "Atebubu-Amantin Municipal District". Statoids.
- District: Atebubu-Amantin Municipal District
- 19 New Districts Created , November 20, 2003.
