= Atebubu =

- Location in Ghana
- Coordinates: 7°45′N 0°59′W
- Country: Ghana
- Region: Bono East Region
- District: Atebubu-Amantin District

Population (2010)
  - Total: 105,938

Atebubu is a town and the capital of Atebubu-Amantin District in the Bono East Region of Ghana. According to the 2010 Population Census in Ghana, the town has a population of 105,938. As at 2023, the Municipal chief executive of the town is Edward Owusu. As at 2023, the Adontenhene of the Atebubu Traditional Council is Nana Owusu Gyimah. The name Atebubu is derived from the Twi words ate (wild yam) and buo (place).

== Education ==
The town is known for the Atebubu College of Education.
