= Johnson Asiedu Nketiah =

Ghanaian politician

Johnson Asiedu Nketiah A headshot of Johnson Asiedu Nketiah

Chairman for NDC
- Incumbent
- Assumed office 2025
- Preceded by: Samuel Ofosu-Ampofo

Vice President for Socialist International
- In office 2017–2022
- Preceded by: António Guterres

Deputy Minister of Food and Agriculture (Crops)
- In office 1997–2001
- President: Jerry John Rawlings
- Preceded by: Dr Matthew K. Antwi

Member of Parliament for Wenchi West Constituency (Fourth Republic)
- In office 1993–2005
- Succeeded by: Hon Joe Danquah

Member of Consultative Assembly representing Wenchi District Assembly
- In office 1992–1993

Assembly Member for Wenchi District Assembly
- In office 1988–1990

Personal details
- Born: Johnson Asiedu Nketiah; 24 December 1956 (age 69) Seikwa, Bono Region, Ghana
- Party: National Democratic Congress
- Spouse: Mrs. Vida Adomah Nketiah
- Children: Amma Addae Nketiah, Kwaku Asiedu Nketiah, Yaa Asantewaa Nketiah, Afia Afra Nketiah and Kwame Boateng Nketiah
- Education: University of Ghana, Legon & Ghana Armed Forces Command College
- Occupation: Politician
- Profession: Banker, Stock Broker, Farmer and Teacher

Johnson Asiedu Nketiah is a Ghanaian politician and Chairman of the National Democratic Congress (NDC). He is noted to be the longest serving General Secretary of the NDC.

== Early life and family ==
Johnson Asiedu Nketiah was born in Seikwa B/A in the Wenchi Municipal District which was then part of the Bono Ahafo Region but now in the Bono Region of Ghana on 24 December 1956, to Nana Kwaku Asiedu, a farmer from the Oyoko Royal family and Madam Hagar Akosua Afrah of the Akwamu Royal family. He is the fifth child of nine children.

Johnson Asiedu Nketiah had his basic education at Seikwa Presbyterian Primary School. He proceeded to train as a teacher at St. Joseph’s College of Education in Bechem from 1974 to 1978 where he graduated as a trainee teacher in 1978.

He began his career as a professional teacher at Seketia Presby Primary in the Jaman North District of the Bono region. He gained admission to the University of Ghana Business School in 1983 to read a Bachelor of Science Degree in Business Administration (Banking and Finance option).

Nketiah was a member of the pioneer batch for a Post Graduate Training Programme in Stock Brokerage and Investment Analysis when the Ghana Stock Exchange was introduced. He obtained a Master of Science Degree in Defense and International Politics from the Ghana Armed Forces Command College in 2019.

== Professional career ==
Johnson Asiedu Nketiah began his professional career at GIHOC Distilleries Company Limited, where he did his national service in the marketing department and later served as acting marketing manager. He then worked in rural banking, as a manager at Nkoraman Rural Bank and as a trainee manager at Sehwi Asawinso Rural Bank.

He was part of the pioneer cohort of professionals trained for the newly established Ghana Stock Exchange, and was named best trainee of the programme. He subsequently joined the National Trust Holding Company Limited (NTHC) as a stockbroker and investment banker. He later left the financial sector to take up full-time politics.

== Political career ==
Summary

Johnson Asiedu Nketiah entered public life in 1989, when he was elected to the Wenchi District Assembly as the representative for Seikwa. In 1992 he represented the Wenchi District at the Consultative Assembly that drafted the Constitution of the Fourth Republic. He then served three terms as Member of Parliament for Wenchi West (Ghana parliament constituency) Wenchi West, from 1993 to 2005. During that period he was also Deputy Minister of Food and Agriculture, responsible for crops, under President Jerry John Rawlings from 1997 to 2001. In Parliament he sat on the Appointments, Finance and Public Accounts committees.

=== 1992 Ghanaian General Elections ===
First Term in Parliament.

He was elected into the first parliament of the fourth republic of Ghana on 7 January 1993, after being pronounced winner at the 1992 Ghanaian election held on 29 December 1992. In the 2020 December elections petition he was crossed examined along with Rojo Mettle-Nunoo.

=== 1996 Ghanaian General Elections ===
2nd Term in Parliament.

He was re-elected into the 2nd parliament of the 4th Republic of Ghana and represented during the 1996 Ghanaian general election on the ticket of the National Democratic Congress. He defeated Obeng Manu Jnr. of the New Patriotic Party by obtaining 41.60% of the total valid votes cast which was equivalent to 19,386 votes while Obeng obtained 19.10% which was equivalent to 8,905 votes.

=== 2000 Ghanaian General Elections ===
3rd Term in Parliament.

In the year 2000, Asiedu Nketiah won the Ghanaian general elections as the member of parliament for the Wenchi West constituency of the Brong Ahafo Region of Ghana. He won on the ticket of the National Democratic Congress. His constituency was a part of the 7 parliamentary seats out of 21 seats won by the National Democratic Congress in that election for the Brong Ahafo Region.

The National Democratic Congress won a minority total of 92 parliamentary seats out of 200 seats in the 3rd parliament of the 4th Republic of Ghana. He was elected with 11,720 votes out of 24,531 total valid votes cast. This was equivalent to 49.2% of the total valid votes cast. He was elected over Joe Danquah of the New Patriotic Party, Kusi Edward Kofi of the National Reform Party and Joana Mayfair Abebrese of the Convention People's Party. These won 11,041, 542, and 507 votes respectively out of the total valid votes cast. These were equivalent to 46.4%, 2.3% and 2.1% respectively of the total valid votes cast.

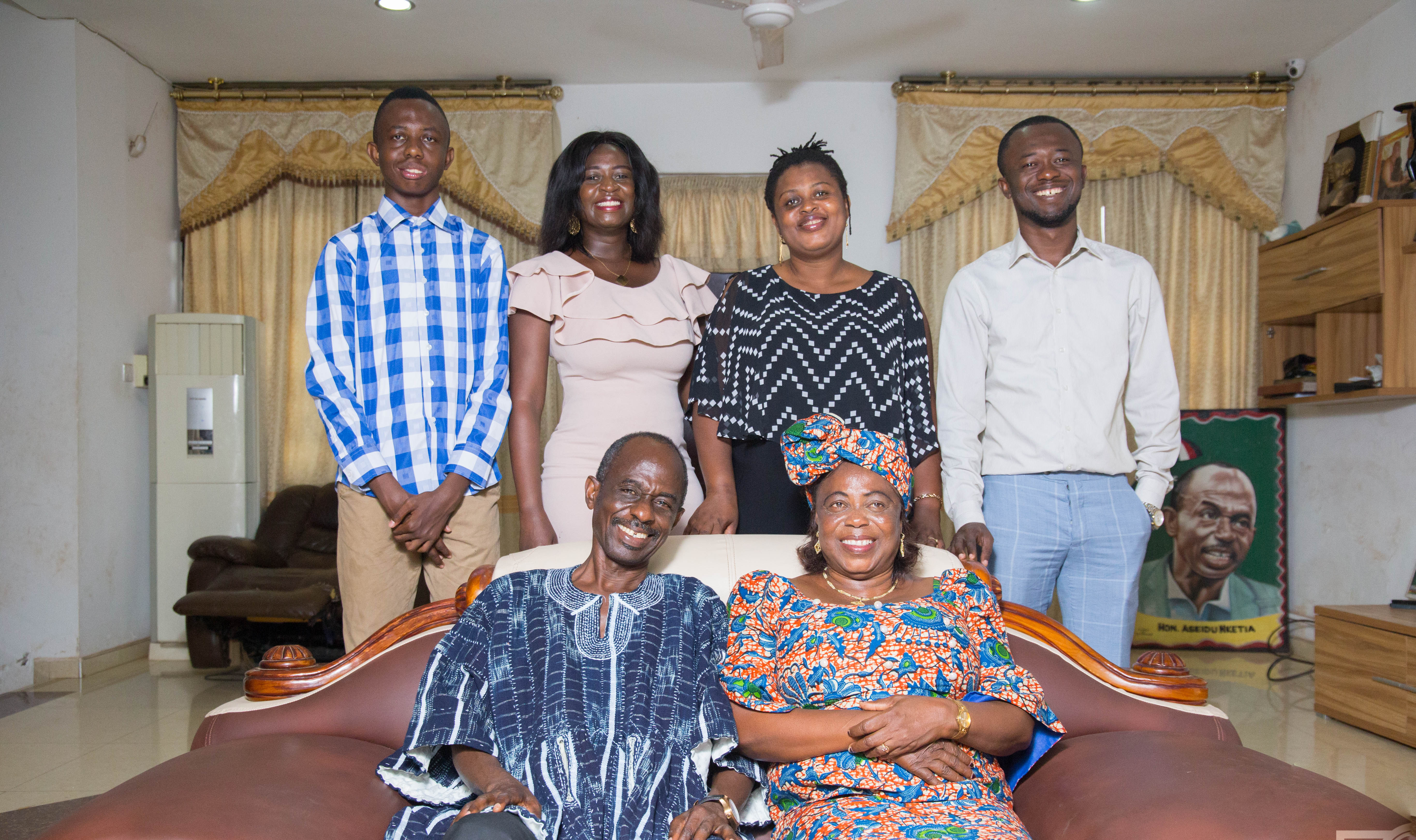
Hon Johnson Asiedu Nketiah with his wife and children

His Shift to Party Politics

In December 2005, at the party's congress in Koforidua, he was elected the third General Secretary of the National Democratic Congress with nearly 80 per cent of the vote, succeeding Dr Nii Armah Josiah-Aryeh. He later declined a ministerial appointment from President John Evans Atta Mills so he could concentrate on the work of the General Secretary. He was re-elected several times, and in 2018 he won a fourth consecutive term, defeating his deputy, Koku Anyidoho, with 6,644 of the 8,299 votes cast.

In December 2022, after 17 years as General Secretary, he contested the national chairmanship and won it with 5,569 votes to 2,892 for Samuel Ofosu-Ampofo. He is the longest-serving General Secretary in the party's history and the first to move from that office to National Chairman. In October 2026 he announced that he would not continue as National Chairman.

In 2017 he was elected Vice-President of the Socialist International, in absentia, at its congress in Cartagena, succeeding António Guterres.

== Public image ==
Asiedu Nketiah is widely known by the nickname "General Mosquito". The name was given to him by political opponents after he refused, as a member of Parliament's Appointments Committee, to approve a ministerial nominee he considered unqualified, despite an appeal from the sitting President. He later adopted the name himself.

== International politics ==
In 2017, Mr Asiedu Nketiah was elected as Vice President of Socialist International in absentia at Cartagena to succeed the former Prime Minister of Portugal and current UN Secretary-General, António Guterres. He was elected to serve under the current President of the Organization, George Papandreou, who doubles as the Prime Minister of Greece.

== Personal life ==
He is a Christian and a staunch member of the Presbyterian Church of Ghana. He is married to Mrs Vida Adomah Asiedu Nketiah and has five (5) children.
