= Margaret Amoakohene =

Ghanaian academic and diplomat

Margaret Ivy Amoakohene PhD

High Commissioner to Canada
- In office 2006–2009
- President: John Agyekum Kufour

Member of Council of State
- Incumbent
- Assumed office 2017
- President: Nana Akuffo-Addo

Personal details
- Born: 17 July 1960 (age 66) Wenchi, Brong Ahafo Region
- Party: New Patriotic Party
- Spouse: Mr. Amoakohene
- Education: University of Ghana; University of Leicester
- Occupation: Lecturer

Margaret Ivy Amoakohene (born 17 July 1960) is a Ghanaian academic and diplomat. She has served in various sectors of governance and academia. She was Ghana's High Commissioner to Canada in the John Agyekum Kufour administration. She is a senior lecturer and acting director of the School of Communication Studies at the University of Ghana, Legon. She was member of the Council of State under the administration of Nana Akuffo-Addo.

== Early life and education ==
Margaret Ivy Amoakohene was born on 17 July 1960 at Wenchi in the Brong Ahafo Region. She is a native of Nsawkaw, capital of the Tain District in the Brong Ahafo Region. She obtained her GCE Ordinary level certificate from St. Francis Secondary School in Jirapa, in the Upper West Region of Ghana from 1974 to 1979. She then proceeded to St. Louis Senior High School in Kumasi to obtain her GCE Advanced level certificate. In 1981, she enrolled at the University of Ghana for a Bachelor of Arts degree in French and Spanish. Amoakohene had her postgraduate education at the University of Ghana where she graduated with a Master of Philosophy degree and a Post-graduate Diploma in Communication Studies. She later obtained a Doctor of Philosophy degree in mass communication from the University of Leicester in England.

== Working life ==
Since 1992, Ivy Amoakohene has lectured students in various aspects of public relations, qualitative research methods, and mass communication at the University of Ghana. She has been actively engaged in several aspects of academic and national life, including serving on the boards of the National Media Commission, Ghana News Agency, Ghana Broadcasting Corporation, and the National Film and Television Institute. The Institute of Public Relations Ghana made her an honorary Secretary, and vice-president in recognition of the significant roles she has played in the advancement of public relations in Ghana. In 2010 she was appointed acting director of the School of Communication Studies at the University of Ghana.

== High Commissioner to Canada ==
In 2006, President John Agyekum Kufour appointed Amoakohene to head Ghana's Embassy in Canada as its High Commissioner. She officially begun her diplomatic responsibility on 26 September 2006 when she presented her letters of commission to the Governor General of Canada, Her Excellency Michaelle Jean, at her official Provincial office and residence at La Citadel in Quebec City. As High Commissioner, she embarked on some philanthropic activities, one of which involved the donation of medical equipment to the Nsawkaw Hospital. She was the second High Commissioner to Canada in the Kufour administration and served in that position from July 2006 to February 2009.

== Council of State ==
In February 2017, President Nana Akuffo-Addo nominated Amoakohene as one of the eleven president-appointed members of the Council of State. The 25-member Council of State is the constitutionally mandated advisory body to the President.
