= Bui National Park =

National park in Ghana

- IUCN category II (national park)
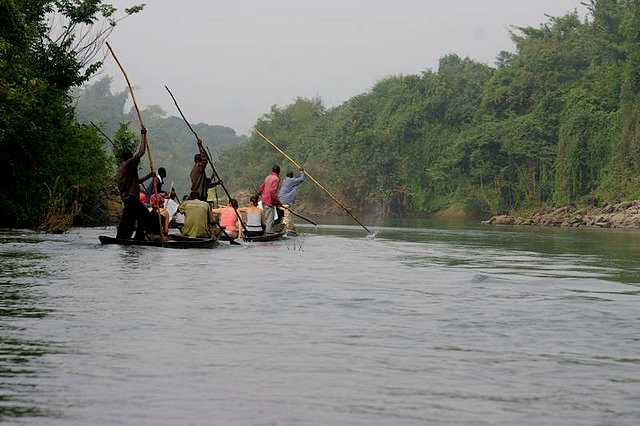

- Location within Ghana
- Location: Bono Region and Savannah Region of Ghana
- Nearest city: Nsawkaw, Wenchi and Techiman
- Coordinates: 8°18′N 2°22′W
- Area: 1,820 km^{2} (700 sq mi)
- Established: 1971

The Bui National Park is located in Ghana. It was established in 1971. This park spans 1,821 km^{2}.

== Geography ==
Bui National Park is bisected by the Black Volta River; the section on the West of the river forms part of the Bono region and the section on the East of the river forms part of the Savannah Region of Ghana. The park borders Ivory Coast to the West. The closest towns are Nsawkaw, Wenchi and Techiman.

=== Environment ===
The park is located in a typical woodland savanna zone. It is notable for its large hippopotamus population in the Black Volta. The endangered ursine colobus and a variety of antelopes and birds are also present. The park has been designated an Important Bird Area (IBA) by BirdLife International because it supports significant populations of violet turacos, red-throated bee-eaters, bearded barbets, Senegal parrots, yellow-billed shrikes, Senegal eremomelas, oriole warblers, white-crowned robin-chats and Heuglin's masked weavers.

== Bui Dam ==
Part of the park has been inundated by the reservoir of the Bui Dam, which was constructed from 2007 to 2013.

== Gallery ==
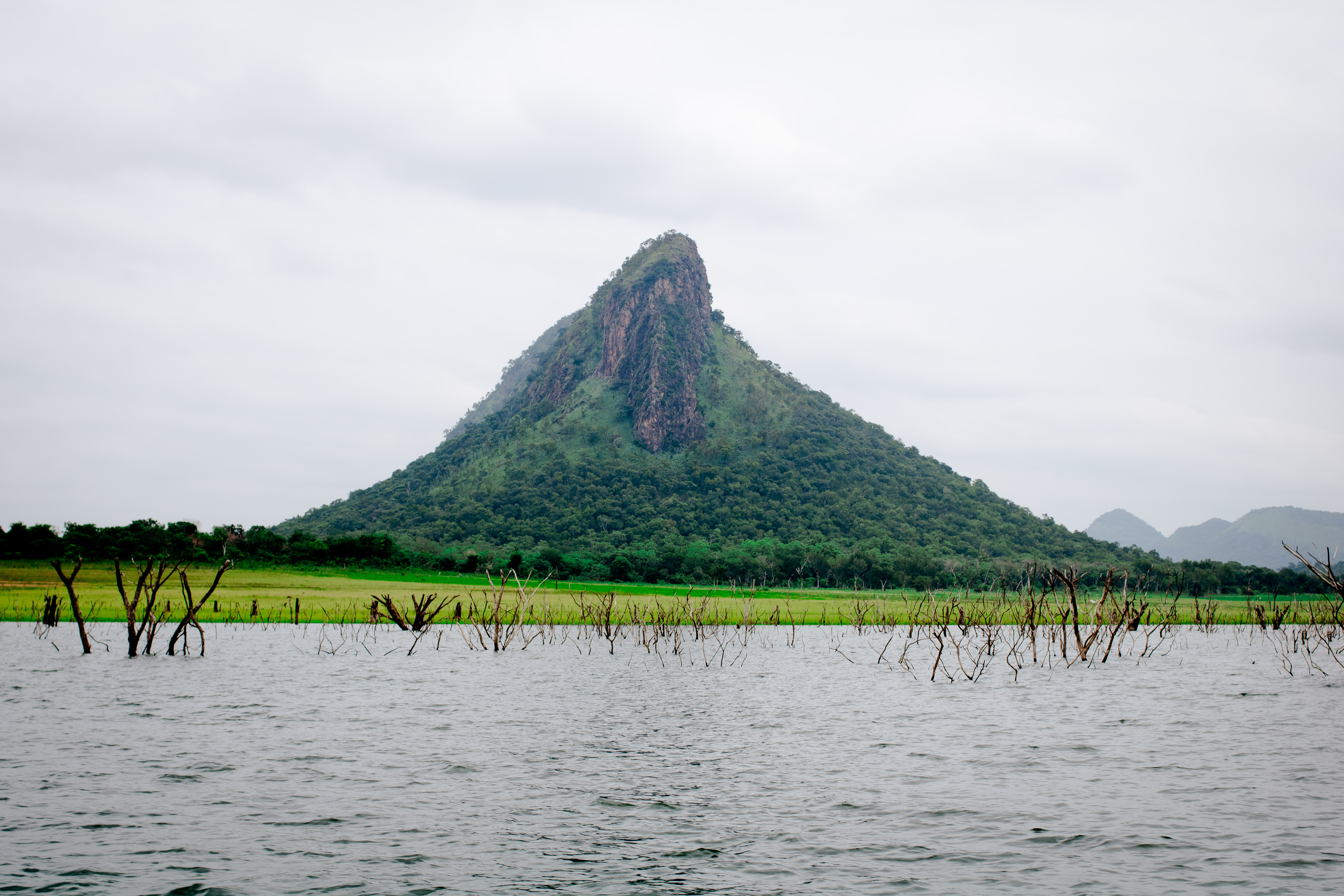
A mountain view taken from the Bui reservoir

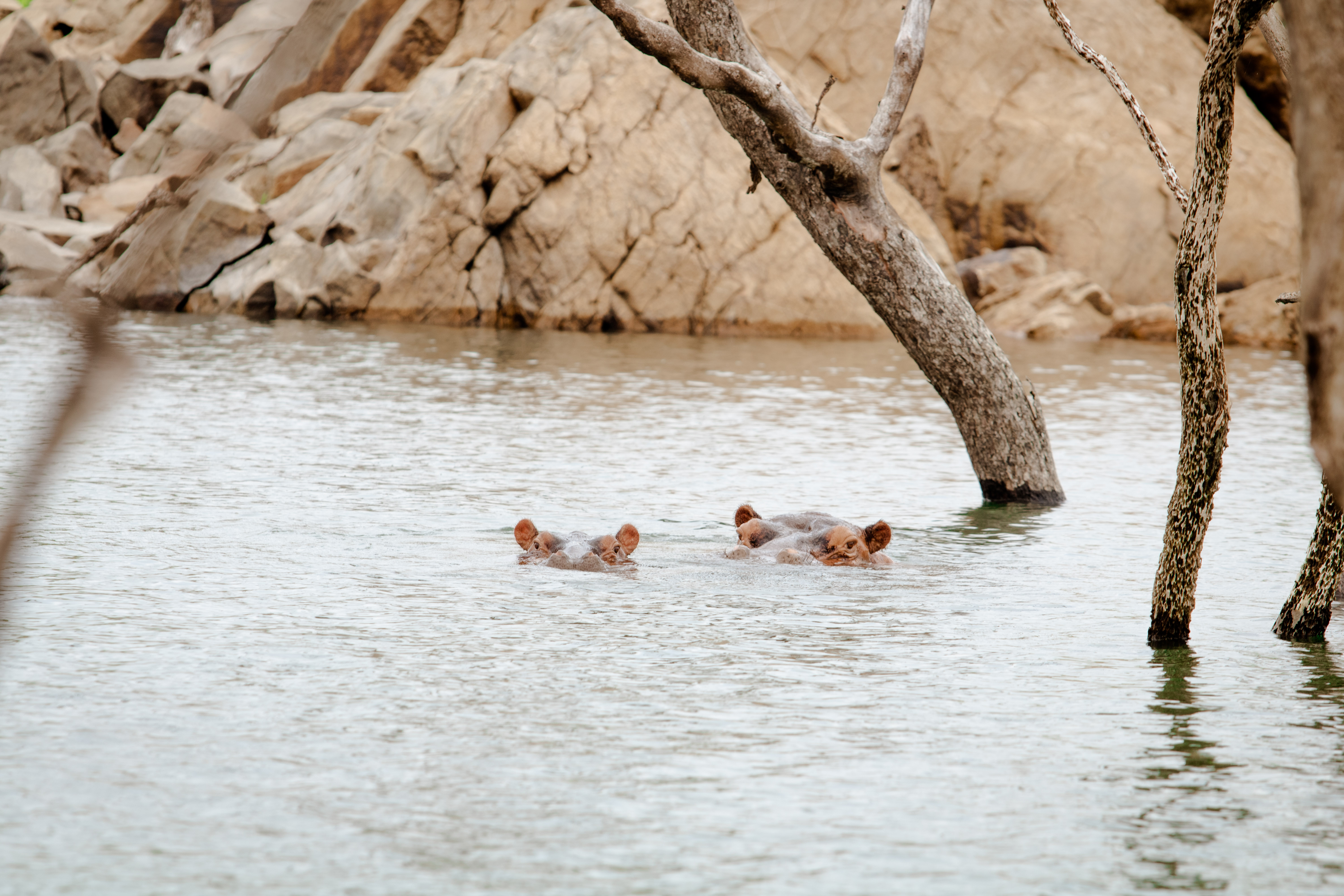
Hippopotamuses swimming in the reservoir

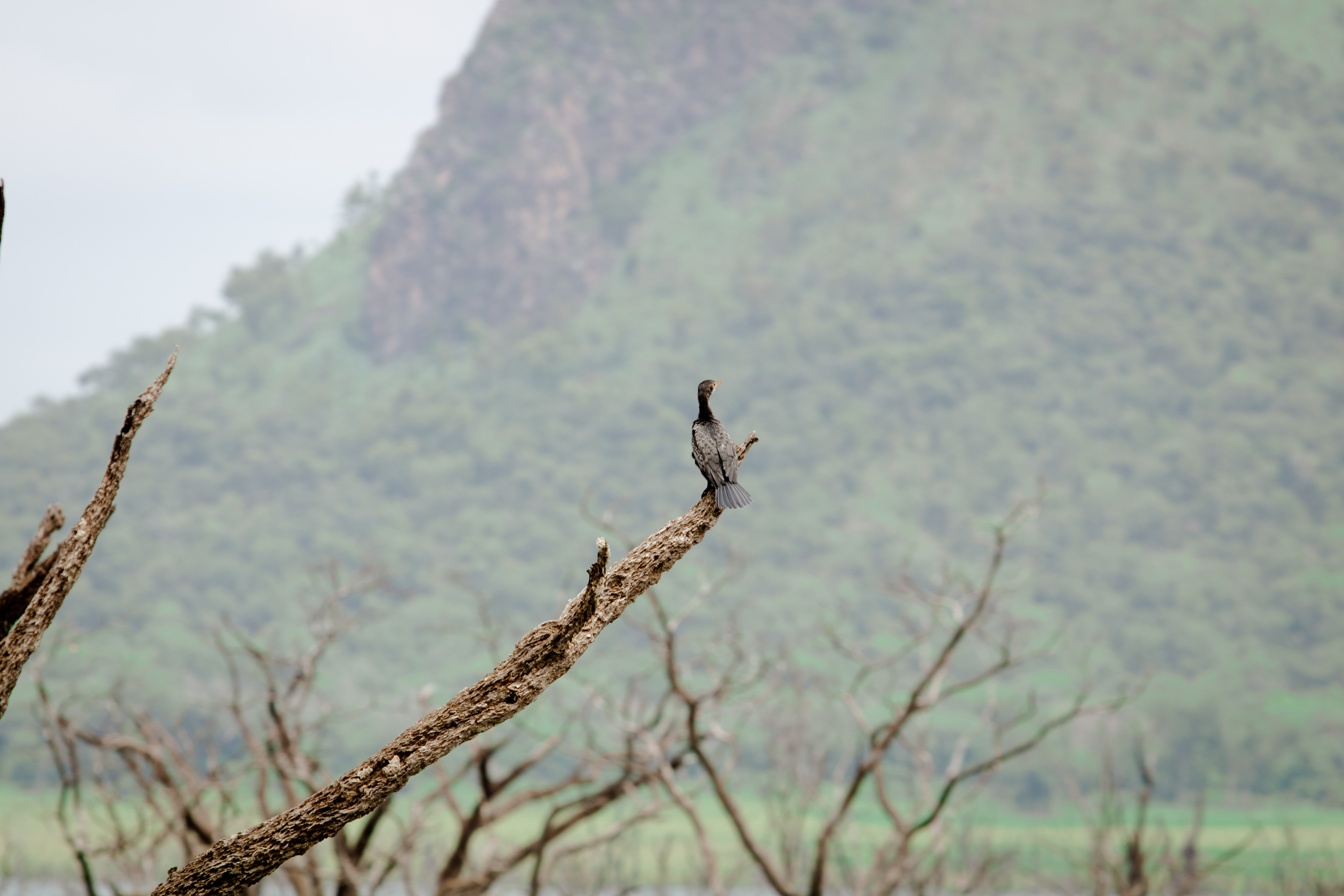
Cormorant resting on a dried tree in the lake

Video of boat ride at Bui National Park

Panoramic view of Bui National Park from Sunshine Mountain

Scenic video showing the Bui Reservoir surrounded by mountainous terrain within Bui National Park
