= Wenchi Tomato Factory =

Tomato factory in Ghana

- Wenchi Tomato Factory
- Formation: 1960; 66 years ago
- Purpose: Canning Tomato Paste
- Location: Wenchi, Bono Region, Ghana

Wenchi Tomato Factory is a tomato processing and canning company, located in Wenchi, capital of Wenchi Municipal of the Bono Region, Ghana.

== History ==
The factory was set up in 1960s by Osagyefo Dr. Kwame Nkrumah, as one of six projects financed by a joint agreement of the government of Ghana and Sodefra. Operations ceased after the 1966 Ghanaian coup d'état. After many years, it was handed over to private company, Afriquid Company Limited. In 1997, the factory was sold to GIHOC (Ghana Industrial Holding Corporation) Distilleries Company Limited but deserted for a while. For five years (2002–2007), the factory resumed processing of tomato products under the brand name "Wenchi Fresh" but closed again due to the unstable supply of the expected tomato type from tomato farmers within the Wenchi Municipal District Beposo, Awisa and Nchiraa. Collaborations between the Ministry of Food and Agriculture, GIZ (German Development Cooperation), Unilever Ghana Limited, Wenchi District Assembly and other development partners, failed to maintain running of the factory, as the farmers sold the produce for higher gains on the open market.

== See also ==
- Pwalugu Tomato Factory
