= Fordjour Festival =

Festival in Ghana by the Badu people

Fordjour (Yam) Festival is an annual harvest festival celebrated by the chiefs and peoples of Badu in the Wenchi district in the Bono Region, formally Brong Ahafo region of Ghana. It is usually celebrated in the month of August and September. Others also claim it is celebrated in October.

== Celebrations ==
During the festival, visitors are welcomed to share food and drinks. The people put on traditional clothes and there is durbar of chiefs. There is also dancing and drumming.

== Significance ==
This festival is celebrated to mark an event that took place in the past.
