= Abuorso (Bono East Region) =

Community in Bono East Region, Ghana

- Town
- Country: Ghana
- Region: Bono East Region
- District: Tain District
- Time zone: GMT
  - Summer (DST): GMT

Abuorso is a community in SEIKWA in the Tain District in the Bono Region of Ghana. As at 2022, Mr Sampson Mensah Akrosmah was the assemblyman of the area. It is also the location of Nkoranman Senior High School built by Mr Asiedu Nketiah.

== Institutions ==
- St. Peter’s Catholic Church
