= Tia Sugri Alfred =

Ghanaian politician and veterinary surgeon

Hon. Tia Sugri Alfred

Deputy Minister of Health
- Preceded by: Rojo Mettle-Nunoo

Member of Parliament for Nalerigu/Gambaga
- In office 7 January 2009 – 6 January 2013
- President: John Atta Mills
- Preceded by: Alima Hajia Mahama

Personal details
- Born: 12 March 1956 (age 70)
- Party: National Democratic Congress
- Children: 5
- Education: University of Ibadan, Nigeria
- Occupation: Veterinary Surgeon

Tia Sugri Alfred (born 12 March 1956) was the Member of Parliament for Nalerigu/Gambaga constituency in the Northern region of Ghana for the 5th Parliament of the 4th republic of Ghana

== Early life and education ==
Tia was born on 12 March 1956. He hails from Samini in the Northern region of Ghana. He earned a Doctor of Veterinary Medicine at the University of Ibadan in Nigeria.

== Career ==
Tia is a veterinary surgeon by profession. He was the CEO of Central Veterinary Company in Tema.

He was a Member of Parliament from January 2009 to January 2013.

== Politics ==
Tia is a member of the National Democratic Congress (NDC). He was a committee member for Health, Special Budget. Tia was first elected into office in the 2008 Ghanaian general elections as the Member of parliament for the Nalerigu Gambaga constituency in the Northern region of Ghana. He was elected with 15,443 votes out of the 34,701 valid votes cast, equivalent to 44.5% of total valid votes cast. He was elected over Hajia Alima Mahama of the New Patriotic Party, Banaba M Alando of the People's National Convention, John Bibirim of the Democratic Freedom Party and Alhassan Zibilim an independent candidate. These people obtained 32.96%, 20.83%, 0.54% and 1.17% respectively of total valid votes cast. He was deputy minister of health succeeding Rojo Mettle-Nunoo.

=== 2000 Elections ===
In the year 2000, he lost with 12 valid votes in the general elections as the member of parliament for the Nalerigu constituency of the Northern Region of Ghana to Issahaku A.Emmanuel of the Peoples National Convention Party who was elected with 9,515 valid votes cast. This is equivalent to 33.70% of the total valid votes cast. Other Candidates who came off second best in the elections include Alima Mahama of the New Patriotic Party, Joshua D.Wundowa of the National Reform Party, Hamidu Napoleon Dawuni of the Convention Peoples Party, Majeed Inusah of the united Ghana Movement. These acquired4,407, 911,461,440 and 12 votes out of the total valid votes cast respectively. These were equivalent to 15.60%, 3.20%, 1.60% and 1.60% respectively of total valid votes cast.

== Personal life ==
Alfred is married with five children. He is a Christian (Presbyterian).
