= St. Francis Secondary School =

St. Francis Secondary School may refer to:

- St. Francis Secondary School (Sierra Leone), school in Sierra Leone
- St. Francis Secondary School (Ontario), school in St. Catharines, Ontario
- St. Francis Secondary School (Ghana), school in Ghana.
