= Bui Hydro–Solar Hybrid Project =

Renewable energy hybrid project in Ghana

Coordinates: 5.6127°N 0.1810°W

The Bui Hydro–Solar Hybrid Project is a renewable energy development, led by the Bui Power Authority (BPA), that integrates utility-scale solar photovoltaic (PV) generation and battery storage with the existing Bui Hydroelectric Generating Station on the Black Volta in the Bono/Bono East (formerly Brong-Ahafo) region of Ghana. The hybrid configuration – including floating PV on the Bui reservoir and ground-mounted arrays nearby is intended to increase overall generation capacity, improve grid reliability, and demonstrate a model for combining seasonal hydropower with solar to smooth output and maximise renewable energy use.

== Background ==
The Bui Hydroelectric Generating Station (commonly called the Bui Dam) began commercial operation in the 2010s and provides base-load hydroelectric generation to Ghana's national grid (around 400–404 MW). To augment that capacity and make more efficient use of the reservoir and transmission infrastructure, BPA developed plans to add solar PV and supporting equipment to create Ghana's first large-scale hydro–solar hybrid facility and one of West Africa's earliest floating-solar installations.

== Future ==
Aside from the 250MW project centered at Bui alone, the Bui Power Authority (BPA) said plans are underway to develop other solar plants in the northern part of the country, with six sites already identified.
