= Ama Bame Busia =

Ghanaian politician (1935/1936–2023)

Ama Bame Busia (1935/1936 – 12 December 2023) was a Ghanaian politician and a former member of the council of state. She was the sister of the late Kofi Abrefa Busia, former Ghanaian prime minister. She was a member of New Patriotic Party. Busia initially oppose choosing Dr Mahamudu Bawumia as the running mate for the 2008 Ghanaian general election but later asked the former president of Ghana Nana Addo Dankwa Akufo-Addo for forgiveness and said "Bawumia is Ghana’s best ever Vice President".

== Education ==
Busia father initially denied her from attending school because she was a royal but her brother Kofi Abrefa Busia later convinced their father to allow her to go to school where she was the only girl in her class. She had her primary education at Wenchi Methodist School and Methodist Middle Girls' School in Kumasi. She trained as a teacher at the Komenda Training College. In 1959, she went into exile in London with her brother, Kofi Abrefa Busia and there she studied Institutional Management and Catering at the Regent Street Polytechnic.

== Books ==
She launched her book "Bittersweet Pill of Politics" in 2022.

== Death ==
Busia died at the Nyaho Medical Centre on 12 December 2023, at the age of 87. Her one week funeral observation was observed at Abelemkpe in Accra.

== Awards and recognition ==
Busia was honoured as one of the most inspiring women in Ghana in the area of politics.
