= Apour Festival =

Festival in Ghana by the people of Nwoase and Nsawkaw

Apoo Festival is an annual festival celebrated by the chiefs and people of Nwoase and Wenchi Traditional Area in Nwoase and Nsawkwa in the Bono Region, formally the Brong Ahafo region of Ghana. It is usually celebrated in either the month of May or June in Nsawkaw, either November or December in the town of Nwoase and either May or June in Wenchi.

== Celebrations ==
During the festival, visitors are welcomed to share food and drinks. The people put on traditional clothes and there is durbar of chiefs. There is also dancing and drumming.

== Significance ==
This festival is celebrated to mark an event that took place in the past. It is celebrated to commemorate the rejection of the former evil ways of the people.
