= Seikwa =

- Location in Ghana
- Coordinates: 7°43′15″N 2°31′00″W
- Country: Ghana
- Region: Bono Region

Seikwa is a town located in Tain District, in Bono region (formerly Brong Ahafo), Ghana. As of 2010, Seikwa had a population of 9,166, consisting of 4,149 males and 5,017 females. The town is served by the Nkoranman Senior Secondary School.
