= Bayidie Festival =

Festival in Ghana by the people of Mo in Wenchi

Bayidie (Yam) Festival is an annual harvest festival celebrated by the chiefs and peoples of Mo in Wenchi District in the Bono Region, formerly Brong Ahafo region of Ghana. It is usually celebrated in the month of August and September.

== Celebrations ==
During the festival, visitors are welcomed to share food and drinks. The people put on traditional clothes and there is durbar of chiefs. There is also dancing and drumming.

== Significance ==
This festival is celebrated to mark an event that took place in the past.
