= Pwalugu Tomato Factory =

Tomato processing plant in Pwalugu, Ghana

Pwalugu Tomato Factory, also known as the Northern Star Tomato Company, is a Ghanaian tomato processing plant located in Pwalugu in the Upper East Region. The factory produces puree and paste.

== History ==
The factory was established by Kwame Nkrumah, Ghana's first president. Construction was completed in 1961, along with several other factories built around the same time to further the Nkrumah government's policy of import substitution. However, the factory did not begin operating until 1973.

After an extended closure, it recommenced operations in 2006 as Northern Star Tomato Company. At that time, it did not operate at full capacity.

In 2009, the Ministry of Trade and Industry provided funding to pay staff salaries and purchase tomatoes from farmers.

As of 2011, the factory had the capacity to handle 500 tonnes of raw tomatoes per day. It underwent its most recent corporate reorganisation in 2014.

The factory was featured in the 2019 Deutsche Welle documentary Tomatoes and Greed: The Exodus of Ghana's Farmers. It has been reported that the factory had collapsed owing to the deprivation of the requisite tomato supply to let it work at the least level.

== See also ==
- Wenchi Tomato Factory
