= Wenchi S.C. =

Ghanaian football club

Wenchi Sporting Club
- Full name: Wenchi Sporting Club
- Nickname: Unity
- Founded: 2007
- Ground: Vocational School Recreation Ground; Wenchi, Brong-Ahafo, Ghana
- Capacity: 3,000
- Chairman: Moses Yirenkyi Otchere
- Manager: Kwabena George
- League: Brong Ahafo Division Two Zone 9
Home colours	Away colours	Third colours

Wenchi Sporting Club formerly known as Unity Sporting Club is a Ghanaian football club based in Wenchi, Brong-Ahafo. They are competing in the Brong Ahafo Division Two Zone 9. In July 2013 the club executives voted to change the name to Wenchi Sporting Club, a move which was aimed at getting the people to Wenchi to have a sense of belonging to the club.

The club was founded in 2007 by the club's president Mr. Ernest Anokye-Gyan with support from Unity Community & Sport Association and Unity Football Club, of Reading in Berkshire, England to promote safe ground for young athletes to develop their football skills. The club also operates a sports academy which currently has 150 youngsters between the ages of 10 – 21 years, focusing on the education and development of young athletes.

Unity Sporting Club uses football as a tool to engage a large pool of street children on a regular basis who traditionally have little access to sporting activities. The academy then aims to develop children's ability to be coached, both on and off the football pitch, with the aim of empowering them through a programme of non-formal education which is complemented by a fun and goal oriented rewards.

The club registered to compete in the Ghana Division Two League to provide playing opportunities for its existing players and experience for younger players from Unity Academy. It competed in the Division Two League, the third tier of Ghanaian football, during the 2010–11 season. This also provided academy players with a potential route into senior football through Unity Sporting Club (USC).

== The Academy ==
Unity Sport Academy

Unity Academy is a Centre of Sporting Excellence run by Unity Sporting Club in association with UCSEF. The academy has a computer centre powered by Enterprise FI Solution. Aimed at disadvantaged children and young people, particularly orphans and victims of HIV/AIDS. The centre is based in Wenchi in the Brong Ahafo, a deprived area of Brong Ahafo region, Ghana. 150 boys aged 3–21 years, are currently enrolled. The academy coaches provide free training session at a local girls school, this is the only way we can currently include girls in the project as very few girls have shown interest.

The academy offers full scholarships to those at risk of poverty and hardship.

unity young kids training hard in the rain

UNITY ACADEMY is pioneering in its approach to pastoral care through sport, working collectively with local and international organisations to attain the overall objective of better welfare for local children. The academy is in partnership with local nursery, primary and secondary schools such as St. Augustine Catholic School and Koase Secondary School. The academy is in partnership with local businesses to apprenticeship for those who are not academically talented to learn trade which will better their survival chance in their communities.

== Current squad ==
Note: Flags indicate national team as defined under FIFA eligibility rules; some limited exceptions apply. Players may hold more than one non-FIFA nationality.

No.	Pos.	Nation	Player
1	GK	GHA	Siaka Tanko
2	DF	GHA	Alex Nyarko
3	DF	GHA	Albert Owusu Afena
4	DF	GHA	Augustine Owusu Pinamang
5	DF	GHA	Alexader Obeng
6	MF	GHA	Rexford Antwi Gyamfi
8	MF	GHA	Atta Francis
9	FW	GHA	Bright Owusu
10	MF	GHA	Thomas Yeboah
11	FW	GHA	Joseph Gyamfi
12	GK	GHA	Collins Gyan
13	MF	GHA	Frank Akyereko
14	MF	GHA	Ebenezer Adofo
15	MF	GHA	Daniel Boateng
16	DF	GHA	Frank Dankwa
17	MF	GHA	Alhaji Sedu

No.	Pos.	Nation	Player
18	FW	GHA	Joseph Boateng Twum
19	MF	GHA	Abrefa Mensah
22	MF	GHA	Edward Damoah
23	DF	GHA	Emmanuel Akyeremeh
24	MF	GHA	Eric Twum Berimah
25	DF	GHA	Yaw Paul
26	MF	GHA	Yaw Emmanuel Abrefa
27	FW	GHA	Kelvin Koran
28	MF	GHA	Stephen Sakyi
29	FW	NGR	Anochie Afamefuna Martins
30	MF	GHA	Solomon Frimpong
31	FW	NGR	Okon Edinamobong Nte
32	MF	GHA	ssah Braima
33	FW	GHA	Stephen Owusu
35	DF	GHA	Issah Zakari

== Staff ==
- Chairman: (Ghana) Moses Yirenkyi Otchere
- Vice Chairman: (Ghana) Francis Kyei Appiah
- President: (Ghana) Ernest Anokye
- Director of Football: (United Kingdom) Kwaku Nimako
- Finance Director: (Ghana) Julius Atobrah Boateng
- Communications Director: (Ghana)
- Chief Executive Officer: (Ghana) Joseph Manu
- Club Secretary: (Ghana) Stephen Ahenakwa
- Head Coach: (Ghana) Kwabena George

== Unity Cup Competition ==
=== 2009 Competition (September 2009) ===
- Under 12 Winners: Ajax Academy
- Under 12 Runners Up: Unity SC U12
- Under 14 Winners: Ajax Academy
- Under 14 Runners Up: Unity SC U14

Unity president advising the youths at the 2009 Unity Cup held in Wenchi
