= Black Volta =

River in Burkina Faso and Ghana

Black Volta Volta noire
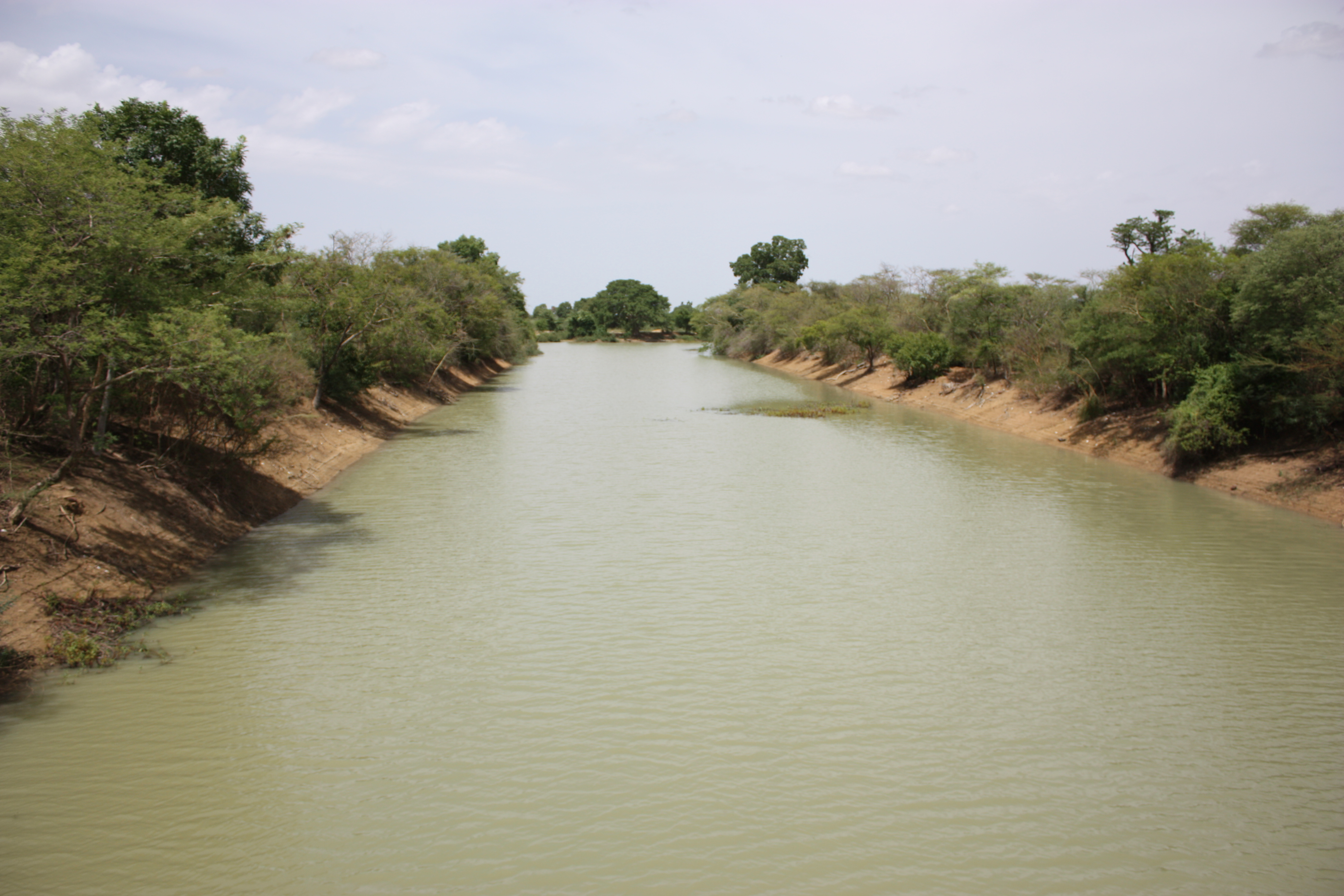
- Black Volta (Mouhoun) near Dédougou, Burkina Faso

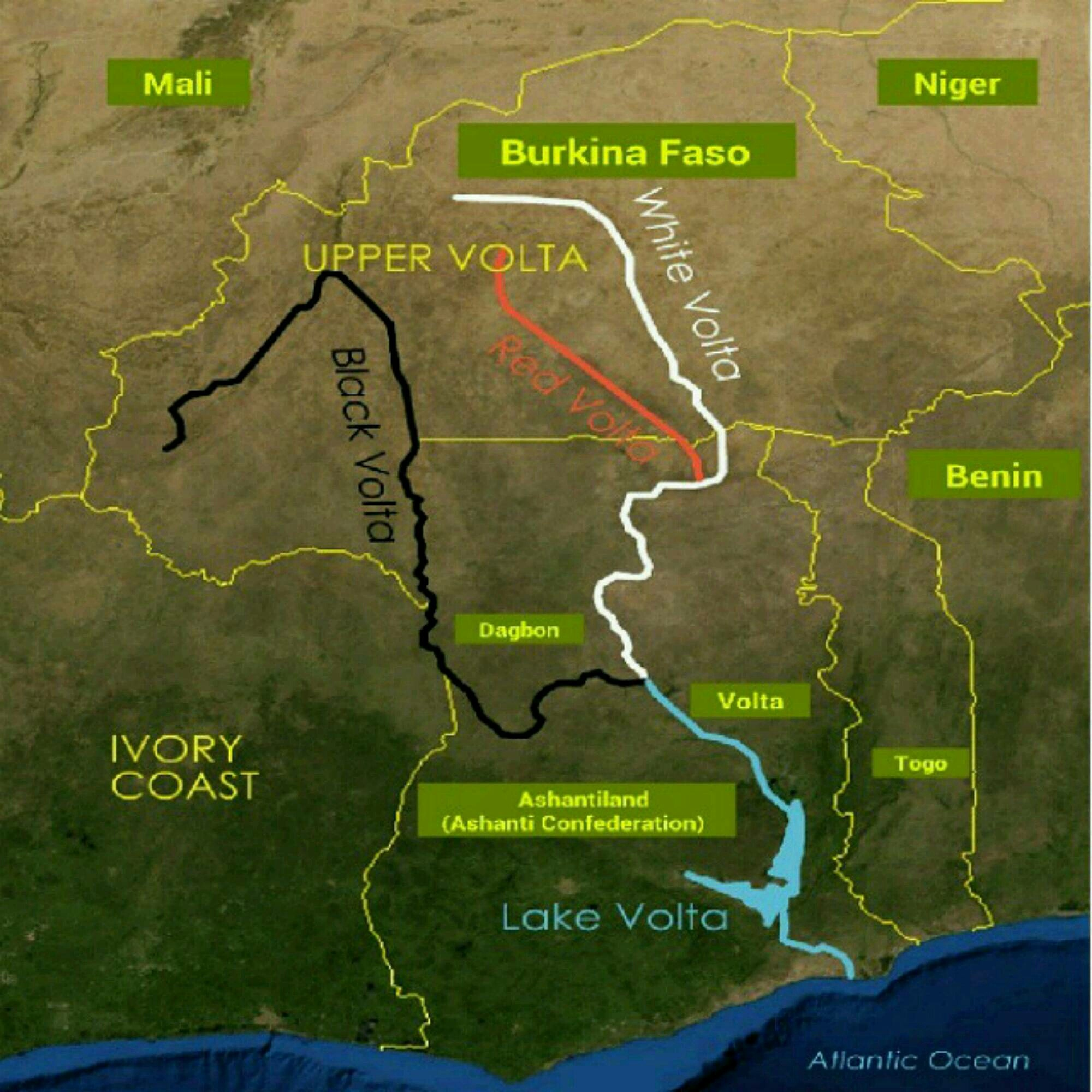
- Black Volta shown in black

Location
- Countries: Burkina Faso; Ivory Coast; Ghana

Physical characteristics
- Mouth: Volta River
  - location: Lake Volta
  - coordinates: 8°41′00″N 1°33′00″W
- Length: 1,352 km (840 mi)
- Basin size: 147,000 km^{2} (57,000 sq mi)
- Discharge
  - location: Mouth
- (Is home to many forms of wildlife that are unique to this part of the world)

The Black Volta or Mouhoun (French: Volta noire) is a river that flows through Burkina Faso for approximately 1,352 km (840 mi) to the White Volta in Dagbon, Ghana, the upper end of Lake Volta. It is one of the three main parts of the Volta, with the White Volta and the Red Volta.

The source of the Black Volta is in the Cascades Region of Burkina Faso, close to Mount Tenakourou, the highest point of the country. Further downstream it forms part of the border between Ghana and Burkina Faso, and later between Ivory Coast and Ghana. Within Ghana, it marks the border between the Savannah and Bono regions. The Bui Dam, a hydroelectric power plant, is built on the river, just south of the Bui National Park, which the river bisects.
