= Ghana School Feeding Programme =

The Ghana School Feeding Programme (GSFP) started in 2005 as a pilot project to provide food to children at school. It is run by the GSFP Secretariat in partnership with international agencies including the World Bank, the World Food Programme, the Partnership for Child Development, and UNICEF, as well as national organizations such as the Canadian International Development Agency (CIDA), the US Agency for International Development (USAID) and the Dutch embassy.

The short-term goal of the GSFP is to contribute to an increase in school enrollment, reduce short-term hunger and malnutrition of kindergarten and primary school pupils. In addition, it is to boost domestic food production. For the long term goal, it seeks to improve food security and reduce poverty.

The programme targets all public primary schools and kindergartens in Ghana. It has been able to feed about 1.69 million children, representing about 37.4% of National coverage. The programme has provided employment for 34,350 caterers and cooks especially women to enable them to take care of their families.

Some of the challenges of the program include but not limited a lack of transparency and accountability. Other challenges include farmers being unwilling to sell their produce on credit due to the government’s delay in the release of funds. Also, the farmers are sometimes far within the reach of the caterers. Another challenge is with finance since the GH¢1 per child is inadequate. Community involvement, staff capacity building, access to potable water, inadequate infrastructure in some beneficiary schools (kitchens, storerooms, dining halls), and monitoring and evaluation are also of great challenge.
