= St. Francis Secondary School (Ghana) =

St. Francis Secondary School is a second cycle institution in Jirapa in the Upper West Region of Ghana.

== Notable alumni ==
- Margaret Amoakohene, Ghanaian academic and Member of Council of State.
