= Joe Danquah =

Ghanaian politician

Hon. Joe Danquah

Member of Parliament for Tain Constituency
- In office 7 January 2005 – 6 January 2009
- President: John Kufuor
- Preceded by: New Constituency
- Succeeded by: Ahmed Ibrahim

Personal details
- Born: 9 May 1972 (age 54)
- Party: New Patriotic Party
- Education: University of Ghana
- Profession: Politician, District Chief Executive

Joe Danquah was a Ghanaian politician and Member of Parliament for the Tain constituency of the Brong Ahafo region of Ghana.

== Early life and education ==
Danquah was born on 9 May 1972. He obtained a Bachelor of Arts degree at the University of Ghana.

== Political career ==
Danquah was elected as the member of parliament for the Tain constituency in the 3rd parliament of Ghana after it was newly created in 2004. Before proceeding into parliament he worked as a District Chief Executive.

=== 2004 Elections ===
This was after he won the elections in the 2004 Ghanaian general elections for the constituency. He thus represented the constituency in the 4th parliament of the 4th republic of Ghana. He was elected with 16,328 votes out of 32,351 total valid votes cast. This was equivalent to 50.5% of total valid votes cast. He was elected over Ahmed Ibrahim of the National Democratic Congress and Joana Mayfair Abrebrese of the Convention People's Party and Jemima Yahaya of the Every Ghanaian Living Everywhere Party. These obtained 15,410 votes, 373 votes and 240 votes respectively of the total valid votes cast. These were equivalent to 47.6%, 1.2% and 0.7% respectively of the total valid votes cast. Asiedu Mensah was elected on the ticket of the New Patriotic Party. His constituency was a part of 14 parliamentary seats out of a total 24 seats won by the New Patriotic Party in the Brong Ahafo region of Ghana in that elections. In all, the New Patriotic Party won a majority total of 114 parliamentary representation out of a total 230 seats in the 4th parliament of the 4th republic of Ghana.

=== 2008 Elections ===
Danquah failed to maintain his seat in the 2008 Ghanaian general elections as the Member of Parliament for the Tain Constituency. He was oust by the candidate of the major opposition party, the National Democratic Party – Ahmed Ibrahim. After the elections, however, Danquah alleged that his loss was as a result of intimidation by the electorate during the elections by members of the National Democratic Congress.

== Personal life ==
Danquah is a Christian.
