= Tain District =

District in Bono region, Ghana

- District
- Districts of Bono Region

- Location of Tain District within Bono Region
- Coordinates: 7°52′N 2°19′W
- Country: Ghana
- Region: Bono Region
- Capital: Nsawkaw

Government
  - District Executive: Jones Samuel Tawiah

Area
  - Total: 1,953 km^{2} (754 sq mi)

Population (2021)
  - Total: 115,568
  - Density: 59.17/km^{2} (153.3/sq mi)
- Time zone: UTC+0 (GMT)

Tain District is one of the twelve districts in Bono Region, Ghana. Originally it was formerly part of the then-larger Wenchi District on 10 March 1989; until the western part of the district was split off to create Tain District on 12 November 2003 (effectively 17 February 2004); thus the remaining part has been retained as Wenchi District (which it was later upgraded to municipal district assembly status and has been renamed as Wenchi Municipal District on 29 February 2008). Later, the northern part of the district was split off to create Banda District on 28 June 2012; thus the remaining part has been retained as Tain District. The district assembly is located in the northeast part of Bono Region and has Nsawkaw as its capital town.

== List of settlements ==
Settlements of Tain District
No.	Settlement	Population	Population year
1	Atomfoso		
2	Chechewere		
3	Badu		
4	Bonga		
5	Brodi		
6	Brohani		
7	Debibi		
8	Mamasa		
9	Menji		
10	Nsawkaw		
11	Seikwa		
12	Abuorso		

== Sources ==
- "Tain District". Statoids.
- District: Tain
- 19 New Districts Created , November 20, 2003.
