= Nsawkaw =

- Town and District Capital
- Location of Nsawkaw in Bono region
- Coordinates: 7°52′N 2°19′W
- Country: Ghana
- Region: Bono region
- District: Tain District
- Elevation: 892 ft (272 m)

Population
  - Ethnicity: Akan people
- Demonym: Nsawkawian
- Time zone: GMT
  - Summer (DST): GMT

Nsawkaw is a town and the capital of Tain district of the Bono region of Ghana. The hometown of the native people of Nsoko was Hani Begho (pronounced Bew). It has a population of about 6,000.

History teaches that the people of Nsoko emerged from a hole and first settled at Hani. Tradition further recalls that during their stay at Hani, a self-styled creator came with his mother called ASO to stay with them. Sooner than later, the mother died and when he (the self-styed creator) was informed about the death, he exclaimed “Asoko”, meaning ASO is gone, and eventually became Nsoko which has been Anglicized Nsawkaw. As at 2021, the Omanhene of Nsawkaw was Daasebre Okogyeaman Nana Duodu Ampem II.
