= Wenchi Municipal District =

Wenchi Municipal District District Municipal de Wenchi
- Municipal District
- Districts of Bono Region

- Location of Wenchi Municipal District within Bono Region
- Coordinates: 07°34′38″N 01°55′45″W
- Country: Ghana
- Region: Bono Region
- Capital: Wenchi

Government
  - Municipal Chief Executive: Dr Prince Kwakye Afriyie

Area
  - Total: 4,939 km^{2} (1,907 sq mi)

Population (2021)
  - Total: 124,758
- Time zone: UTC+0 (GMT)
- Website: Wenchi Municipal District Official Website

Wenchi Municipal District is one of the twelve districts in Bono Region, Ghana. Originally created as an ordinary district assembly in 1988 when it was known as Wenchi District, until the western part of the district was split off to create Tain District on 12 November 2003 (effectively 17 February 2004); thus the remaining part has been retained as Wenchi District. It was later elevated to municipal district assembly status and has been renamed as Wenchi Municipal District on 29 February 2008. The municipality is located in the northeast part of Bono Region and has Wenchi as its capital town.

== Geography and location ==
The municipality is located in the eastern part of Bono Region of Bonoland of Bono people. It is bounded to the south by Sunyani Municipality and to the north by Kintampo South District. It also shares a common boundary with Tain District to the west and Techiman Municipal District to the west.

The municipality lies within latitudes 7° 30′ South and 7° 15′ North and longitudes 2o 17’ West and 1° 55′ East. The municipality covers 1,296.6 square kilometres (500.6 sq mi). Wenchi Municipal is one of the largest of the 12 districts in the Bono Region. Wenchi town, the municipal capital, is 56 km from Sunyani and 29 km from Techiman. Its closeness to Techiman, a major national market, poses several benefits for agricultural production.

== Economy ==
The majority of the people in the municipality derive their livelihoods mainly from the environment thus the land for farming, animal husbandry and settlements.

== List of settlements ==
Settlements of Wenchi Municipal District
No.	Settlement	Population	Population year
1	Akrobi		
2	Amponsakrom		
3	Asuogya		
4	Awisa		
5	Awoase		
6	Badu		
7	Nchiraa		
8	Nsawkaw		
9	Tromeso		
10	Subinso		
11	Subinso No. 2		
12	Wenchi	38,375	2012

== Education ==
The human resources system in Wenchi Municipal depends greatly on their level of education. Education is valued by the people of the district and considered by the people the best way for development inside of the district

Generally, physical accessibility to basic schools is commendable. This is especially so at the primary level where virtually every community has a Kindergarten (KG) and a primary school. In 2009, there were seventy public primary schools and twenty-two private primary schools in the municipality. Children from communities that do not have primary schools do not walk more than 3 km to access a facility. The number of junior high schools (JHS) however does not equal the number of primary schools in the municipality. In 2010, there were forty public junior high schools and ten private junior high schools. This partly contributed to a high drop-out rate at the JHS level as pupils had to commute over longer distances to access a facility. For instance, JHS pupils from Akete and Nyinamponaase walked a distance of 7 km everyday to attend JHS in Wenchi and Tromeso respectively in 2009.

In 2010, the municipality had two well established senior high schools: Wenchi Senior High School and Koase Senior High School. The municipality recognized the need to improve access to secondary education and started another senior high school at Nchiraa in 2010.

In 2010, basic school enrollment in the municipality was appreciable considering that over 90% of children of school going age were actually in school. The total enrolment during the 2009/2010 academic year stood at 25,751 of which 51.9% are males while 48.1% are females. Gender Parity Index (GPI) in education had improved tremendously over the years. The GPI which was 0.89 in 2007 increased to 0.92 in 2008 and 0.93 in 2009. The implication is that increasing numbers of females are being given access to education. Factors contributing to this included the introduction of the capitation grant, the School Feeding Programme and other such social interventions.

Enrolment in schools has been increasing since 2010. This could be an indication of improving human resource development for the district.

== Health care ==
The main emphasis of district development plan is on improved public health, and, many improvements have been made in nutrition and in maternal and child care. Many of the endemic diseases, such as malaria, pneumonia, and diseases of the gastroenteritis group, has been eliminated.

In 2010, there were eight (8) health facilities providing health care to inhabitants of the Municipality. Out of the eight, five were public or government health facilities while the other three were privately owned. These health facilities occasionally referred cases to the Sunyani Regional Hospital. In 2010, the problem with health facilities in the Municipality was that only two hospitals in the municipality were privately owned and this made the cost of health delivery very high. There was also the problem of spatial disparity in the distribution or location of facilities.

There were a total of two hundred and ninety-eight health professionals manning these health facilities in 2010. As of 2010 there were:

- Six medical doctors
- Four medical assistants
- Sixty-six nurses and midwives and
- Twenty-nine support staffs working in the municipality.

The Methodist hospital was the highest employer, employing about 183 professionals. In 2010, staffing level of the population to doctor ratio stood at 1:11,330, which was an improvement compared to the 2007 ratio of 1:16,176. In 2010, the municipality also had a population to nurse ratio of 1:1545. Even though the municipality had recorded some significant increases in the number of health professionals in the past two years since 2008, the numbers in 2010, were still not enough considering that the hospitals in the municipality serve as a referral point for health facilities in the Tain District.

== See also ==
- Bayidie Festival

== Sources ==
- "Wenchi Municipal District". Statoids.
- District: Wenchi Municipal District
- 19 New Districts Created , November 20, 2003.
- Wench Municipal Assembly Development Plan, 2009
