= Rojo Mettle-Nunoo =

Ghanaian contemporary artist and politician

Robert Joseph Mettle-Nunoo also known as Rojo Mettle Nunoo is Ghanaian contemporary artist and politician. He is a member of the National Democratic Congress and served as the Deputy Minister of Health during the John Evans Atta Mills government.

== Education ==
Mettle-Nunoo has a Bachelor of Arts degree in arts (painting and sculpture) from Kwame Nkrumah University of Science and Technology.

== Politics ==
In January 2009, Mettle-Nunoo was appointed as Deputy Minister for Roads and Highways by President John Evans Atta Mills. After a reshuffle of ministers, he was moved to the serve as deputy minister of Health. He was the campaign manager of John Atta Mills in the 2008 December.
