= Wenchi =

Town in Bono Region, Ghana

- Town
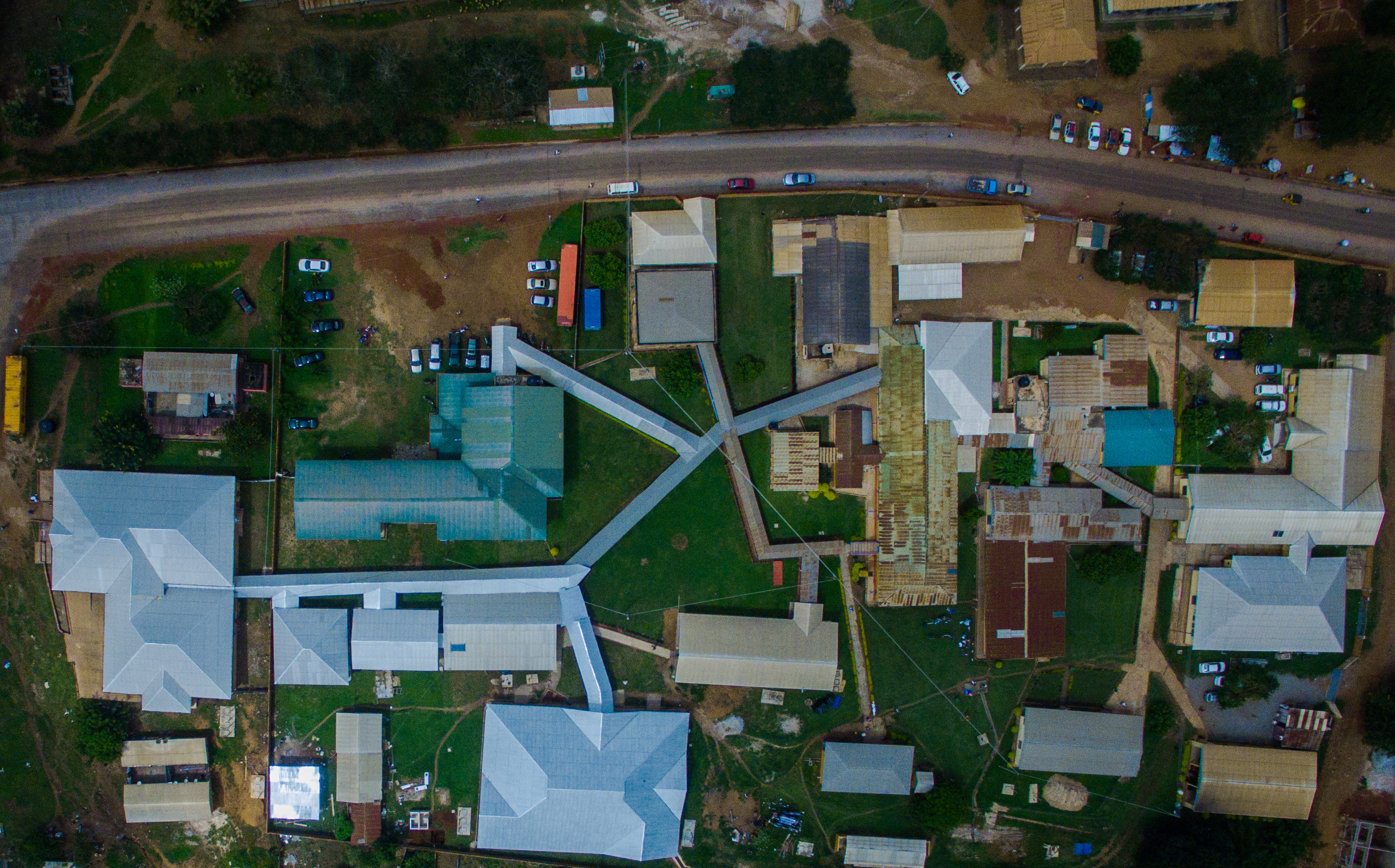
- Aerial view of the town

- Location of Wenchi in Bono, Ghana
- Coordinates: 7°33′33″N 1°55′45″W
- Country: Ghana
- Region: Bono
- District: Wenchi Municipal
- Elevation: 304 m (997 ft)

Population (2012)
  - Total: 39,187
- Time zone: GMT
  - Summer (DST): GMT

Wenchi is a town and the capital of Wenchi Municipal of the Bono Region in the middle-belt of Ghana. Wenchi is located at 7.73333 [latitude in decimal degrees], -2.1 [longitude in decimal degrees] at an average elevation/altitude of 304 meters. Wenchi is approximately 30 km north of Techiman and about 50 km east of the Ivory Coast border. Wenchi has a population of 39,187 people in 2013.

== Climate ==
Climate data for Wenchi (1991–2020)
Month	Jan	Feb	Mar	Apr	May	Jun	Jul	Aug	Sep	Oct	Nov	Dec	Year
Average precipitation mm (inches)	7.2 (0.28)	28.3 (1.11)	87.9 (3.46)	154.3 (6.07)	171.4 (6.75)	154.9 (6.10)	112.4 (4.43)	85.8 (3.38)	173.9 (6.85)	181.4 (7.14)	53.0 (2.09)	10.5 (0.41)	1,221 (48.07)
Average precipitation days (≥ 1.0 mm)	0.7	2.8	5.9	9.2	10.6	11.5	7.7	6.3	13.2	14.2	5.4	1.0	88.5
Source: NOAA

== History ==
Oral traditionsfrom Wenchi, describe an origin from a hole in the ground, aided by a mythical burrowing creature called a wankyie. This symbolic narrative, common among several Akan groups, is often interpreted as a claim to autochthonous status and long-term settlement in the region.

Similar accounts are found in Bono-Tekyiman and Bono Manso, where traditions recount that their ancestors emerged from a sacred hole at Amuowi, a site with archaeological settlement layers dating back to the 5th century CE. These stories underscore the importance of place and sacred geography in Bono political identity. Other traditions include references to migrations from the north, which some scholars interpret as reflecting historical contact or population movement from the Sahel or Savanna regions.

== Archaeology ==
Archaeological work across Bono settlements—particularly at Bono Manso, Begho, and Wenchi—has revealed long-term occupation and complex material cultures dating from the early centuries CE to the precolonial period. Excavations at Bonoso, an early Wenchi site, uncovered pottery, iron slag, animal bones, palm kernels, and grindstones, with radiocarbon samples dated to AD 663–774, marking it as one of the earliest inland Akan settlements. Nearby Ahwene Koko produced similar pottery and a date of AD 1585 ± 80, suggesting later reoccupation and cultural continuity.

In addition to domestic and ritual features, evidence of extensive iron smelting was found at Bonoso, including a slag mound and references to a sub-chief (Awerempehene) responsible for iron production. Painted pottery—rare in southern Akan contexts—was also recovered, pointing to broader regional influences and early craft development in Bono settlements.

== Transport ==
Wenchi is connected by road to Techiman and Sunyani and its airport, Sunyani Airport. Wenchi is not serviced by a railway station on the Ghana Railway Corporation, but it has been proposed that a line be extended to Wenchi. It has less vehicular traffic as few people own cars and motors.

== Culture ==
Wenchi celebrates the annual Apoo, a yam festival in April/May. The climax of the Apoo is the durbar of the king (Omanhene) through Wenchi. In August, the annual yam festival takes place in Wenchi and it marks the end of the first rainy season and harvesting of the yam in the towns of Wenchi and Techiman. In 2019, the Omanhemaa (Queen) of Wenchi was Nana Ntoa Sramangyadua III. The Paramount Chief of Wenchi is Osagyefo Ampem Anye Amoampong Tabrako III who has rule the town since 2019

== Sports ==
The inhabitants of Wenchi are sports fanatics; many residents follow several Wenchi-based sports teams. Current second division team is Wenchiman. The team Unity Sporting Club, a sports academy, is located in Wenchi. Young Apostle football club is a team that promoted to the Ghana Premier in 2024, is located at Wenchi. Wenchi is the home town of Professional footballers including Asamoah Gyan, Baffoe Gyan and Felix Afena-Gyan.

== Education ==
Wenchi Methodist Senior High School

== Notable people ==
Wenchi is the hometown and birthplace of former Ghanaian prime minister Kofi Abrefa Busia, who was born a prince of and is buried there. There is a street named after him, Busia Street. His sister Ama Bame Busia, a former member of council of state, is his only living sibling. Professor George Baffour Gyan is the current MP and minister of planning at the presidency.

== See also ==
- Apour Festival

== Sources ==
- Boachie-Ansah, James (2013). "Preliminary Report on an Excavation Conducted at Bonoso in the Wenchi Traditional Area, Brong-Ahafo Region, Ghana". Nyame Akuma. 79: 134–140.
- Konadu, Kwasi (2010). The Akan Diaspora in the Americas. Oxford: Oxford University Press. doi:10.1093/acprof:oso/9780195390643.001.0001. ISBN 9780195390643.
- Konadu, Kwasi; Campbell, Clifford C. (2016). The Ghana Reader: History, Culture, Politics. Duke University Press. doi:10.2307/j.ctv125jqp2. ISBN 9780822359845.
- Wilks, Ivor (1961). "The Northern Factor in Ashanti History: Begho and the Mande". The Journal of African History. 2 (1): 25–34.
